= List of rugby union video games =

The following is a list of rugby union video games.

Title	Release year	Platform	Developer	Publisher	Ref.
Scrum try	1984	DECO Cassette System		Data East Corp.	
International Rugby	1985	ZX Spectrum	Donald Campbell	Artic Computing Ltd	
MSX Rugby	1985	MSX	Panasoft	Matsushita Electric Industrial Co., Ltd	
International Rugby Simulator	1988	Amstrad CPC, Atari ST, Commodore 64, ZX Spectrum	Codemasters	Codemasters	
Super rugby (Japan)	1989	NES	ZAP	TSS	
Pigskin 621 A.D.	1990	Arcade, Sega Mega Drive ("Jerry Glanville's Pigskin Footbrawl")	Brian Colin, Jeff Nauman	Midway	
Rugby: The World Cup	1991	Amiga, Atari ST, Commodore 64	Walking Circles	Domark	
World Class Rugby	1991	Amiga, Amstrad CPC, Atari ST, Commodore 64, SNES, ZX Spectrum	Dentons	Audiogenic Software Ltd.	
World Class Rugby: Five Nations Edition	1992	Amiga, Atari ST, MS-DOS	Dentons	Audiogenic Software Ltd.	
World Rugby	1992	Amiga, Atari ST, Commodore 64, ZX Spectrum	Zeppelin Games Limited	Zeppelin Games Limited	
International Rugby Challenge	1993	Amiga, Mega Drive	Oxford Mobius	Domark	
World Class Rugby 2: Kokunai Gekitou Hen '93	1994	SNES	Dentons	Misawa	
Super rugby	1994	SNES	Tose	Tonkinhouse	
Rugby World Cup '95	1994	Sega Genesis, MS-DOS	EA Sports UK	EA Sports	
Jonah Lomu Rugby	1997	MS-DOS, PlayStation, Saturn	Rage Software	Codemasters	
Championship Rugby Manager	2000	Microsoft Windows	Waywardxs Entertainment S.R.L.	Midas Interactive Entertainment	
Rugby	2000	Microsoft Windows, PlayStation 2	Creative Assembly	EA Sports	
Rugby 2004	2003	PlayStation 2, Microsoft Windows	HB Studios	EA Sports	
Pro Rugby Manager	2004	Microsoft Windows	Cyanide	Focus Home Interactive	
World Championship Rugby	2004	Microsoft Windows, PlayStation 2, Xbox	Swordfish Studios	Acclaim Entertainment	
Rugby 2005	2005	PlayStation 2, Xbox, Microsoft Windows	EA Canada	EA Sports	
Rugby Challenge 2006	2006	PlayStation 2, Microsoft Windows, Xbox	Swordfish Studios	Hip Interactive, Ubisoft	
Rugby 06	2006	PlayStation 2, Microsoft Windows, Xbox	HB Studios	EA Sports	
Rugby 08	2007	PlayStation 2, Microsoft Windows	HB Studios	EA Sports	
Rugby Challenge	2011	PlayStation 3, Xbox 360, Microsoft Windows, PlayStation Vita	Sidhe	Tru Blu Entertainment	
Rugby World Cup 2011	2011	PlayStation 3, Xbox 360	HB Studios	505 Games	
Rugby Challenge 2: The Lions Tour Edition Wallabies Rugby Challenge 2: The Lions Tour Edition^{AU} Jonah Lomu Rugby Challenge 2: Top 14 & Pro D2 Edition^{FR} All Blacks Rugby Challenge 2: Featuring the Lions Tour^{NZ}	2013	PlayStation 3, Xbox 360, Microsoft Windows	Sidhe	Tru Blu Entertainment	
Rugby 15	2014	PlayStation 4, Xbox One, PlayStation 3, Xbox 360, PlayStation Vita, Microsoft Windows	HB Studios	Bigben Interactive, Maximum Games	
Rugby World Cup 2015	2015	Microsoft Windows, PlayStation 3, PlayStation 4, PlayStation Vita, Xbox 360, Xbox One	HB Studios	Bigben Interactive, Plug In Digital	
Rugby Challenge 3	2016	PlayStation 4, PlayStation 3, Xbox One, Xbox 360, Microsoft Windows	Wicked Witch Software	Tru Blu Entertainment	
Rugby 18	2017	Steam (Windows only), PlayStation 4, Xbox One	Eko Software	Bigben Interactive	
Rugby Champions	2019	Microsoft Windows	Alternative Software Ltd, Biological Systems Modeling	Alternative Software Ltd	
Rugby 20	2020	Steam (Windows only), PlayStation 4, Xbox One	Eko Software	Nacon	
Rugby Challenge 4	2020	PlayStation 4, Nintendo Switch, Xbox One, Microsoft Windows	Wicked Witch Software	Tru Blu Entertainment	
Rugby 22	2022	PlayStation 4, PlayStation 5, Xbox One, Xbox Series X/S, Microsoft Windows	Eko Software	Nacon	
Rugby 25	2025	PlayStation 4, PlayStation 5, Xbox One, Xbox Series X/S, Microsoft Windows	Big Ant Studios	Nacon	

== See also ==
- Sports game
