= Rugby World Cup '95 =

1994 video game

- Developers: Electronic Arts (Genesis); Creative Assembly (MS-DOS)
- Publisher: EA Sports
- Platforms: Genesis, MS-DOS
- Release: Genesis; December 1994; MS-DOS; 1995
- Genres: Sports (Rugby)
- Modes: Single-player, multiplayer

Rugby World Cup '95 is a sports video game developed by Electronic Arts and published by EA Sports for the Sega Genesis in 1994. It is based on the sporting event of the same name. An MS-DOS version was developed by Creative Assembly and released in 1995.

== Gameplay ==
Rugby World Cup '95 is developer Electronic Arts' first attempt at a rugby union simulation and is graphically adapted from the company's previous association football title FIFA International Soccer. The game utilizes an isometric viewpoint where the player controls one of the fifteen rugby players on their team at a time with the ability to switch players on command. It features multiplayer for up to four people simultaneously, each controlling a different rugby player. The human competitors can choose to control a rugby player on the same team or on opposing teams with the remainder controlled by the computer.

Four modes are available: Friendly, World Cup, World Cup 95 and League. Friendly engages the player in a single match between two teams of their choice. World Cup mode resembles the format of the Rugby World Cup, with the player controlling a team of their choice through a tournament with a knockout format. World Cup 95 mode features the same format, but with the teams taking part and the order of the matches at the group stage being the same as the 1995 edition of the event. League consists of eight teams who contest a double round-robin tournament.

=== Playable nations ===
The game features all twenty national teams that participated in the 1995 Rugby World Cup, a further ten countries that participated in the qualifying stages, plus two fictional teams: the EA Barbarians and the EA Maulers. The players on each of the teams have fictional names. According to Australian magazine Hyper, the fictional names used for the Australian national team were based on employees of Electronic Arts' Australian operation, including a winger named after the company's local public relations representative.

- Argentina
- Australia
- Canada
- Czech Republic
- England
- Fiji
- France
- Germany
- Ireland
- Italy
- Ivory Coast
- Japan
- Latvia
- Morocco
- Netherlands
- Namibia
- New Zealand
- Portugal
- Romania
- Russia
- Scotland
- South Africa
- Spain
- Sweden
- Tonga
- Uruguay
- United States
- Wales
- Western Samoa
- Zimbabwe

== Development and release ==
Rugby World Cup '95 for the Sega Genesis was developed internally at the Slough branch of Electronic Arts. Leads Jules Burt and Jon Law were assigned to the project after work on 1993's FIFA International Soccer for Genesis was moved to the company's Canadian studio. Rugby World Cup '95 uses the same game engine as its predecessor, borrowing its isometric viewpoint and drastically increasing the number of on-screen sprites and amount of animation. It contained over 2,000 unique sprites and over 100 animated moves. Billy Cain, a designer at EA subsidiary Origin Systems, was brought to assist in during the final months of production because it was running behind schedule. The game was released on console in December 1994. Prior to its release, Rugby World Cup '95 was featured on the British television programme GamesMaster, where Welsh international Rupert Moon competed against England international Dewi Morris using the game.

A DOS CD-ROM version was handled by Creative Assembly, a small UK team which got its start converting Amiga titles to PC. They had established a connection with EA by doing the same with FIFA International Soccer earlier in 1994 and had pioneered the use of live, reaction commentary within the game, a feature that would become an industry standard. Rugby World Cup '95, now fully-titled Rugby World Cup 1995 on PC, would also be upgraded with commentary. The 1995 Genesis EA Sports title Australian Rugby League used the same engine as Rugby World Cup '95.

== Reception ==
Reception

Review scores
| Publication | Score |
|---|---|
| Computer Gaming World | 3/5 (DOS) |
| Computer and Video Games | 91/100 (GEN) |
| Electronic Gaming Monthly | 82% (GEN) |
| Game Informer | 7.75/10 (GEN) |
| Game Players | 90% (GEN) |
| GamePro | 3.5/5 (GEN) |
| Hyper | 86% (GEN); 80% (DOS) |
| Joystick | 144/200 (DOS) |
| Mean Machines Sega | 90/100 (GEN) |
| Next Generation | 3/5 |
| PC Gamer (US) | 52% (DOS) |
| CD-ROM Today | 3.5/5 (DOS) |
| MegaZone | 83/100 |
| PC Player | 70/100 (DOS) |
| Sega Magazine | 90/100 (GEN) |
| Sega Pro | 85% (GEN) |
| VideoGames | 8/10 (GEN) |

Next Generation reviewed the Genesis version of the game, rating it three stars out of five, and stated that "Rugby World Cup '95 is a quality sports game serving as a great welcome to the sport of rugby, oh, and not to mention the game is damn fun." Mean Machines Sega magazine rated the Genesis version 90% and described it as "a spot-on conversion" of the sport. They described the player animation as "superb", noted that there was no evident slowdown when all thirty players appeared on screen at once, and noted that "absolute control is offered over the players" Australian magazine Hyper awarded the Mega Drive version 86% in February 1995. The reviewer praised the game's representation of rugby union, including its scrums, rucks, mauls and lineouts, as well as its responsive controls and multiplayer options. However, the magazine considered the game potentially difficult for players unfamiliar with rugby and noted that the graphics could appear crowded. The reviewer nevertheless regarded it as an enjoyable and unusually detailed sports simulation.

Stuart Campbell reviewed the DOS version in the UK's PC Gamer, criticising the isometric perspective by stating it was difficult to work out where on the pitch the action was taking place from the markings and where other players on the team were located. He also noted that possession of the ball after a tackle appears to be decided at random, and the kicking controls take too long for the player to carry out and usually get interrupted by a tackle as a result. Awarding the game a score of 52%, Campbell's overall verdict was that it "concentrates on realism at the expense of gameplay, but doesn't make a very good job of either".

Reception in continental Europe was generally positive. French magazine Joypad awarded the Mega Drive version 86%. German magazine MAN!AC gave the game 72 out of 100, describing it as an appealing adaptation of rugby with good controls, but criticising its technical execution.

Italian magazine Console Mania was considerably more positive, awarding the game 93 out of 100. Although the reviewer felt that it sometimes resembled a "brawler on grass" more than a strict sports simulation, the game was praised for being highly entertaining. Spanish magazine Todo Sega gave it 88%, praising its presentation and entertainment value while noting its close resemblance to FIFA International Soccer in both viewpoint and gameplay system.

== Commercial performance ==
In Australia, the Mega Drive version appeared repeatedly in Hyper magazine's game charts supplied by retailer The Gamesmen. It ranked tenth in February 1995, ninth in March and eighth in April, before reaching fourth place in the June 1995 chart. In the United Kingdom, Rugby World Cup '95 ranked eighth on the Mega Drive sales chart compiled by Gallup and published in the Easter 1995 issue of Sega Pro. The game subsequently ranked sixth in the magazine's September 1995 chart and ninth in its December 1995 chart, the latter compiled by retailer The Video Game Centre.

== Legacy ==
The Mega Drive version of Rugby World Cup '95 formed the basis for EA Sports' Australian Rugby League (1995), which adapted the game's engine and gameplay for rugby league. A retrospective by Stevivor described Australian Rugby League as a reskin of Rugby World Cup '95 and identified it as the first rugby league video game released for a home console.

Rugby World Cup '95 also marked the beginning of EA Sports' series of rugby union games. In a retrospective history of sports video games, GameSpot identified it as EA's first rugby release, preceding the company's later Rugby series, which began in 2001 and continued with Rugby 2005, Rugby 06 and Rugby 08.
