= The Rugby Forum =

- Formation: 2002
- Type: Website / Forum
- Headquarters: England, UK
- Location: World
- Members: 34,180
- Official language: English
- Owners: St Helens RLFC, Bullitt, Getofmeland (TRF Names)
- Staff: 12
- Website: www.therugbyforum.com

The Rugby Forum is a website and forum providing news and discussion for rugby football fans of all nationalities and of both codes (union and league).

The Rugby Forum started in 2002 as simple, basic forum focusing on the two codes of rugby football. Recently the forum started evolving and expanding to provide blogs, the latest modifications for EA Sports series of rugby games, as well as advice on training and fitness for rugby. A joint announcement from HB Studios and The Rugby Forum was made on 29 March 2010 stating that The Rugby Forum "is now the online home of the up and coming title, Rugby 2012." The Rugby Forum has exclusive news for Rugby 2012 (video game) from HB Studios, as well as question-and-answer sessions with studio heads.

== HB Studios and The Rugby Forum ==
On 29 March 2010, The Rugby Forum announced that they were teaming up with HB Studios, something that was announced as being "an extremely proud moment." Prior to the link up, The Rugby Forum had been the number one online venue for all rugby games talk and mods for 6 years. The Rugby Forum would now become the official online home of the up-coming title, Rugby 2012.

The partnership was described as "a series of exciting projects, including a developmental blog from the Rugby 2012 development team, and hopefully a series of podcasts throughout the coming months in order to give you all the fans an opportunity to put questions to the people working at HB Studios. The Rugby Forum are hoping that the community will get involved where ever they can and hopefully enjoy seeing the developments of the game."

One staff member was quoted as saying, "We are extremely grateful to HB Studios for reaching out to us, their biggest fans, and for them looking for feedback to improve their already excellent series. We look forward to many years of a fruitful partnership and the best of success to The Rugby Forum, HB Studios and to Rugby 2012!"

== Forum categories ==
Screenshot of The Rugby Forum taken on 17 July 2010

The Rugby Forum attempts to encourage a wider range of discussion of rugby and other related interests of its members. The forum includes a good split of Northern and Southern Hemisphere rugby union and rugby league sub-forums. Since 2006 the forum has been specifically known for including the best modification (mod) community for the games in the EA Sports Rugby series such as Rugby 06 and Rugby 08. In early 2010 since the announcement of the link between HB Studios and The Rugby Forum for the Rugby 2012 a new forum appeared which HB Studio's have said they will look at community suggestions on how to improve their new rugby union game.

Major categories of the forum include general rugby; club and provincial rugby union, including the Aviva Premiership, the Pro14 and Super Rugby; rugby league, including Super League and NRL; electronic gaming; Universitas Rugbeia: rugby training information; world sports; and the clubhouse bar.
