= 2K21 =

2K21 may refer to:

- the year 2021
- NBA 2K21, 2020 video game
- PGA Tour 2K21, 2020 video game
