= 2K23 =

2K23 may refer to:

- The year 2023
- NBA 2K23, 2022 video game
- PGA Tour 2K23, 2022 video game
- WWE 2K23, 2023 video game
