= Arturo Bergamasco =

Italian rugby union footballer

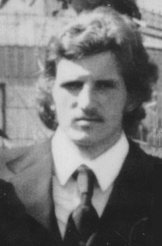
- Arturo Bergamasco in Rome, 1973
- Born: Arturo Bergamasco; 15 March 1951 (age 75) Carrara Santo Stefano, Italy
- Notable relative(s): Mauro Bergamasco (son); Mirco Bergamasco (son)
- Occupation: Professional rugby union footballer

Rugby union career
- Position: Openside flanker
Senior career
Years	Team	Apps	(Points)
1969–1975	Rovigo		
1975–1983	Petrarca		
International career
Years	Team	Apps	(Points)
1973–1978	Italy	4	(0)

Arturo Bergamasco (born 15 March 1951) is a retired Italian rugby union footballer. He played as an open-side flanker.

He played for Rovigo and Petrarca where he won two Italian championships. He earned his first national cap with Italy national rugby union team on 23 June 1973 against Border Bulldogs at East London.

His two sons Mirco and Mauro Bergamasco are also professional rugby players. His sons are featured on the cover of the Italian version of the EA Sports game Rugby 08.
