= Viking: Battle for Asgard =

2008 video game

- European cover art
- Developer: Creative Assembly (Note: Windows port developed by Hardlight)
- Publisher: Sega
- Platforms: PlayStation 3, Xbox 360, Microsoft Windows
- Release: PlayStation 3 & Xbox 360: NA: 25 March 2008; AU: 27 March 2008; EU: 28 March 2008; Microsoft Windows: WW: 17 October 2012
- Genres: Action-adventure, hack and slash
- Mode: Single-player

Viking: Battle for Asgard is a 2008 action adventure game developed by Creative Assembly and published by Sega for PlayStation 3, Microsoft Windows and Xbox 360. Centered around Norse mythology, the game sees the player controlling Skarin, A Vikings and Freya's chosen champion, against the forces of the Goddess of Death Hel.

== Gameplay ==
The game features three islands in the world of Midgard, which the player can explore freely. The player is able to search and find his fellow Viking soldiers and rescue them, and in return they can assist him in battles.

Since Creative Assembly's last game of this style (Spartan: Total Warrior) there have been several changes. Quick time events being one, with them being used to bring down the larger and tougher enemies in the game, from bringing down giants to shaking off an assassin's grip. The way in which the players fight is also different, where they fight each enemy individually rather than in groups. The players can no longer do a sweeping attack to clear enemies away and may only strike them one by one, which means becoming surrounded is a far greater danger than before. There are RPG elements where the players must buy combos and specialist attacks as they advance through the game.

The world has plenty of settlements which the player can attack and capture. When the player finishes his missions in each island, he must fight a large battle, which can be a great siege or a clash between large armies. One of the main features of the game is the large armies—in many battles there can be hundreds of soldiers fighting to the death.

The player may use different ways of weakening his enemy, such as killing their shaman, who summons enemy troops, or getting into the main fight and use combat moves and combos to kill enemy soldiers and champions, who drop dragon runes. These runes can be used to call upon dragons to attack enemies from the air, destroying them. The combat system of the game features a hack-and-slash style, much like the previous Creative Assembly action game, Spartan: Total Warrior, although it is considerably more violent. Throughout the game, the player has the ability to raid various Legion-held locations on the three main islands. This can range from sneaking into a lumber mill and freeing the Vikings held there (who will help destroy the Legion garrison) to launching an all-out one-man assault against a quarry or tower.

== Plot ==
A fierce struggle is taking place within Asgard, the realm of the Norse Gods. The battle has escalated, spilling over to the mortal world of Midgard and now a Champion must be found, a warrior that can sway this war, which threatens the fate of Asgard and the gods themselves.

The Goddess Hel—daughter of Loki, Norse god of mischief, has been banished from the heavenly kingdom of Asgard for defying Odin's rule. Angry at her fate, she seeks to release the ancient wolf-god Fenrir, which legend tells will bring about Ragnarok—the apocalyptic battle that will destroy Asgard and the gods. With her army of resurrected Viking warriors, Hel marches on the unsuspecting mortal realm of Midgard.

Freya, Goddess of war, is appointed the task of stopping Hel and defending the future of mankind. For her champion she chooses Skarin, a great but troubled young warrior, ignorant of the true reason for his favour with the Gods and thrust into the midst of their bitter war.

As the player strikes down Hel she screams: "You have not freed Midgard!" The player then sees Skarin asking for his place in Valhalla but is refused by Freya, causing Skarin to release Fenrir and begin Ragnarok. A cutscene then states that, although the gods have been destroyed and men now make their own decisions, the essence of the gods is nevertheless still present.

== Reception ==
Reception

Aggregate score
Aggregator	Score		
Aggregator	PC	PS3	Xbox 360
Metacritic	65/100	65/100	68/100

Review scores
Publication	Score		
Publication	PC	PS3	Xbox 360
Destructoid	N/A	N/A	6.9/10
Eurogamer	N/A	N/A	5/10
Game Informer	N/A	7.25/10	7.25/10
GamePro	N/A	N/A	3.5/5
GameRevolution	N/A	B−	B−
GameSpot	N/A	5/10	5/10
GameSpy	N/A	3.5/5	3.5/5
GameTrailers	N/A	7.3/10	7.3/10
GameZone	N/A	6.5/10	7.6/10
Giant Bomb	N/A	3/5	3/5
IGN	N/A	6.3/10	6.5/10
Official Xbox Magazine (US)	N/A	N/A	6.5/10
PC Gamer (UK)	65%	N/A	N/A
PlayStation: The Official Magazine	N/A	3/5	N/A
USA Today	N/A	6/10	6/10
Wired	N/A	7/10	7/10

The game received "mixed or average reviews" on all platforms according to the review aggregation website Metacritic.

Wired gave the PS3 and Xbox 360 versions a score of seven stars out of ten, stating: "At some point, you realize that looking back at each of Viking's qualities, it's hard to really put your finger on anything that's truly standout—and yet it's compelling." Maxim gave the same console versions six out of ten and said that it was "fun, but smells like a rental". USA Today gave the same console versions a similar score of six stars out of ten and said it was "fine as an inexpensive rental for mature Microsoft Xbox 360 or Sony PlayStation 3 gamers interested in fantasy and violence—with a strong emphasis on the latter. It's not a horrible adventure, but a few extra months of testing and tweaking might have resolved some of its problems." Edge gave the Xbox 360 version a similar score of six out of ten and wrote that its shortfalls "just seem so peculiar when compared to the surging competency of its strengths". However, The A.V. Club gave the same console version a D+: "With no reason to fight, all the killing turns into noise—and even the giant cast-of-dozens battles are as engaging as watching ants fight over a cracker."

GamesRadar included it in their list of the 100 most overlooked games of its generation. Editor Jason Fanelli stated that the game's world felt empty yet praised its missions.
