= PGA Tour 2K =

PGA TOUR 2K
- Genre: Sports (golf)
- Developer: HB Studios
- Publishers: Maximum Games; 2K
- Platforms: Microsoft Windows, Xbox One, PlayStation 4, Stadia, Nintendo Switch, Nintendo Switch 2, PlayStation 5, Xbox Series X/S
- First release: The Golf Club; August 19, 2014
- Latest release: PGA Tour 2K25; February 21, 2025

PGA TOUR 2K (originally known as The Golf Club) is a series of golf sports simulation video games developed by HB Studios. The series is currently published by 2K; with Maximum Games publishing the second game in the series.

The premise of the series is to emulate the sport of golf, and more specifically, the PGA Tour.

== History and development ==
On May 22, 2018, HB Studios reached a license agreement with the PGA Tour to include six TPC courses and a PGA Tour career mode in The Golf Club 2019 video game. The agreement did not include rights to player likenesses, as the PGA Tour maintained an existing license agreement with EA Sports for its own PGA Tour game series. Although the series had been dormant since the release of Rory McIlroy PGA Tour in 2015, EA still claimed to have an "ongoing relationship" with the Tour at that time. Later that year, on August 28, 2018, 2K announced that it had acquired the publishing rights to The Golf Club series under its 2K Sports label.

In May 2020, 2K Sports announced that HB Studios was developing PGA Tour 2K21, a continuation of the series under a more extensive PGA Tour license and with several new features.

In March 2021, 2K fully acquired HB Studios, the rights to The Golf Club series IP, and the PGA Tour license. 2K also announced a partnership with Tiger Woods that includes rights for his name and likeness to appear exclusively in the PGA Tour 2K franchise, as well as any other golf games published by 2K during the partnership term.

== Games ==
Aggregate review scores
Game	Metacritic
The Golf Club	(PC) 70/100 (PS4) 66/100 (XONE) 64/100
The Golf Club 2	(PS4) 76/100 (XONE) 69/100
The Golf Club 2019 featuring PGA Tour	(PC) 72/100 (PS4) 75/100 (XONE) 80/100
PGA Tour 2K21	(NS) 72/100 (PC) 74/100 (PS4) 76/100 (XONE) 78/100
PGA Tour 2K23	(PC) 78/100 (PS5) 76/100 (XSXS) 78/100
PGA Tour 2K25	(PC) 79/100 (PS5) 80/100 (XSXS) 78/100
