= Total War Battles: Shogun =

2012 video game

- Developer: Creative Assembly
- Publisher: Sega
- Composer: Jeff van Dyck
- Series: Total War
- Platforms: iOS, Windows, Android
- Release: iOS: April 19, 2012; Win: August 29, 2012
- Genre: Real-time strategy
- Mode: Single-player

Total War Battles: Shogun is a real-time strategy video game spinoff of the Total War series developed by Creative Assembly and published by Sega. It was released on April 19, 2012, for iOS and on August 29, 2012, for Windows. It is not to be confused with the strategy game Shogun: Total War, released by the same publisher.

The iOS release received positive reception from critics, who called its graphics high-quality and its gameplay deep and engaging, whereas the Windows release received mixed reception from critics and end users, with complaints of slow pacing and little connection to other games in the Total War series.

== Gameplay ==
The game plays similarly to other games in the franchise, but without stats and health bars. Rather, looking at the player's samurai will indicate their current status. Buildings can be placed on the map to produce more units. Units cannot retreat due to their observance of Bushido, and only a certain number of units can be used at a time.

== Plot ==
The game is set in late 16th century Japan, where the player must get revenge for the death of his clan by attacking a rival clan.

== Reception ==
The game was received positively, with an aggregate score of 83/100 on Metacritic.

Mark Brown of Pocket Gamer UK rated the game 9/10 and gave it the Gold Award, saying it was a "high-quality production" that "streamlines the RTS genre for mobile play" without sacrificing its depth.

Cassandra Khaw of TouchArcade rated the game 4/5 stars, saying that the lack of visible statistics could be a problem to certain players, but that the game's graphics were well-done, the voice acting was "decent" and the soundtrack was "epic".

Edge Magazine rated the game 8/10, saying that it had an "uncommon level of polish for an iOS title" and that its "ten-hour runtime justifies the premium price tag".

== See also ==
- Shogun: Total War
