= Mark McMorris Infinite Air =

2016 video game

- Developer: HB Studios
- Publisher: Maximum Games
- Engine: Unity
- Platforms: Microsoft Windows; PlayStation 4 Xbox One
- Release: NA: October 25, 2016; EU: October 28, 2016; AU: November 4, 2016
- Genre: Snowboarding
- Modes: Single-player, multiplayer

Mark McMorris Infinite Air is a snowboarding video game developed by HB Studios and published by Maximum Games. First announced in March 2016, it was released on October 25, 2016 for Microsoft Windows, PlayStation 4 and Xbox One. It is the first open-world, physics-based snowboarding video game. It was built in partnership and close collaboration with Olympic snowboarder Mark McMorris.

== Gameplay ==
Infinite Air emphasizes simulation-style gameplay, much like HB Studios' previous work with The Golf Club and Madden NFL 15. Rather than executing tricks through button combos, players use the control sticks of the PlayStation 4 and Xbox One controllers. The left stick controls carving, quick flips, and spins, while the right controls pre-loaded flip torques, shifters, tweaks, and the grab location on your board while in the air. The trigger buttons control right and left grabs.

Like The Golf Club, Infinite Air features procedurally generated courses as well as level editors. Players can share their courses online with others through the game’s social features.

== Development ==
Mark McMorris Infinite Air is designed to do what EA's Skate franchise did for the skateboarding genre. Focusing on physics and realism rather than the arcade style of many other popular snowboarding series, Infinite Air was built in the Unity engine and uses the input of professional snowboarder Mark McMorris to incorporate more realistic mechanics and representation of tricks.

In March 2016, Maximum Games announced a joint venture with HB Studios to release Mark McMorris Infinite Air (announced then as Infinite Air Featuring Mark McMorris). They also announced a fall release date.

In August 2016, the game's release date of October 25, 2016 was announced. Mark McMorris' brother Craig McMorris, as well as Silje Norendal, Torstein Horgmo, Ulrik Badertscher, and Danny Davis were announced as part of the playable roster.

== Reception ==
Mark McMorris Infinite Air has received mixed reviews from critics, varying between platforms. While critics agree that the level editors add plenty of replay value, some found the content at launch to be lacking. Other critics cited a steep learning curve involved in the physics-focused gameplay.
