= Submerged (video game) =

2015 video game

- Developer: Uppercut Games
- Publisher: Uppercut Games
- Director: Ed Orman
- Composer: Jeff Van Dyck
- Engine: Unreal Engine 4
- Platforms: Microsoft Windows; PlayStation 4 Xbox One iOS; Nintendo Switch
- Release: Windows: WW: August 4, 2015; PlayStation 4: NA: August 4, 2015; EU: August 5, 2015; Xbox One: WW: August 7, 2015; iOS: WW: September 7, 2016; Nintendo Switch: WW: June 7, 2019
- Genre: Adventure
- Mode: Single-player

Submerged is a third-person exploration-based post-apocalyptic indie game developed and published by Uppercut Games for Microsoft Windows, PlayStation 4, and Xbox One in 2015, with an iOS port following in 2016. The sequel Submerged: Hidden Depths released on Stadia on 3 December 2020, with Microsoft Windows, PlayStation 4, PlayStation 5, Xbox One, and Xbox Series X/S versions following on 10 March 2022. The game is part of the "ecogames" genre which deal with the effects of climate change.

== Gameplay ==
The player controls a young girl, Miku, as she explores an archipelago of half-sunken buildings, climbing ruins and traversing the spaces between using a rowboat. The game focuses on exploration; it involves no enemies or combat, and Miku cannot be killed.

== Plot ==
The game is set in a dystopian future when global warming has flooded the world. Miku and her younger brother Taku drift into a city partially submerged beneath ocean water with only the tallest buildings protruding from the sea. The two have fled home from their father following his descent into alcoholism since the unfortunate death of their mother; his violent actions towards them have resulted in Taku becoming seriously injured. Taking refuge in the top of a clock tower, Miku begins to explore the city in her motorized fishing boat in search of supplies to treat Taku. She scales buildings, locating relief crates that had been parachuted in during the crisis. The whole time she is observed by aquatic beings who are revealed to be survivors of the city that have undergone a complete mutation to better thrive in their new environment. Miku also realizes to her shock that she herself is now mutating in a similar way. Eventually she locates the final crate and Taku recovers. They are then confronted by the mutants who perform some ritual that purges Miku of her mutation, making her human again. The siblings then take their leave and move on from the city.

== Development and release ==
Submerged was made by a team of former BioShock developers and was chiefly inspired by Journey and Shadow of the Colossus. Additional inspirations included a Grand Theft Auto IV mod that submerges the game's Liberty City in water. The director Ed Orman said: "It was unintentional at the beginning, but the setting we’ve chosen is pretty topical with global warming, sea levels rising and people ignoring that problem." Originally slated for 2014, the game was delayed for a 2015 release for Microsoft Windows, PlayStation 4, and Xbox One. PlayStation Plus, Xbox Gold members, and Steam users were offered discounts at launch. An iOS version, subtitled Miku and the Sunken City, was released in 2016. A version for Nintendo Switch was made available in 2019.

== Reception ==
Reception

Aggregate score
Aggregator	Score
Metacritic	PC: 47/100; PS4: 56/100; XONE: 57/100

Review scores
Publication	Score
Destructoid	3/10
IGN	6.8/10

IGN awarded it a score of 6.8 out of 10, saying "Submerged is a non-violent, sometimes beautiful exploration adventure set in a strange, mysterious future."

== Sequel ==
On December 3, 2020, a sequel Submerged: Hidden Depths was published as a sequel by Stadia Games and Entertainment in partnership with Uppercut Games, as an exclusive title for the Stadia gaming platform. It was released for Microsoft Windows, PlayStation 4, PlayStation 5, Xbox One, and Xbox Series X/S on March 10, 2022.
