= Total War: Arena =

- Cover art
- Developer(s): Creative Assembly
- Publisher(s): Wargaming, Sega, NetEase
- Series: Total War
- Engine: Warscape
- Platform(s): Microsoft Windows
- Release: Steam: March 2015 Wargaming: 22 February 2018 Netease: 22 September 2019
- Genre(s): Real-time tactics, MMO
- Mode(s): Multiplayer

Total War: Arena was a strategy game under development by Creative Assembly and published by Wargaming Alliance. It was the first free-to-play title in the Total War series. Total War: Arena focused on online multiplayer, mixing elements of real-time strategy and multiplayer online battle arena gameplay. The game featured 10-vs-10 battles with each player controlling 3 units, each containing up to 100 warriors.

In November 2016, Wargaming, Sega and Creative Assembly announced a new strategic partnership. Total War: Arena was published worldwide (with the exception of China) under Wargaming's publishing label, Wargaming Alliance. The open beta of the game was launched on 22 February 2018.

Total War: Arena ceased live operations on February 22, 2019, one year after it launched. However, it was announced that Total War: Arena was going to be resurrected in partnership with China-based game company NetEase. But the game was permanently terminated on May 6, 2022 by the developers.

== Gameplay ==
Total War: Arena was a free-to-play third-person multiplayer real-time tactics game. The game consisted of two gameplay modes, one versus human players, and the other against bots. Players typically compete in matches that last a maximum of 15 minutes, but average around 7–9 minutes. In each game mode, the players are in teams of 10 and work together to beat an equally sized team, victory is achieved through annihilating all enemy forces, having more soldiers at the end of the time limit or capturing the enemy base.

In all game modes, players control commanders, who are historical figures. There are 14 commanders in-game spread across four factions. Players unlock and upgrade these commanders over time, enhancing their three unique abilities. The commander is attached to the player's units in battle. Each player brings three units to the battle, and the number of soldiers in these units range between 45 and 100, depending on the unit type.

Players progressed through 10 tiers of units, starting with only a few available to them, and unlocking more by researching them through the unit tree.

There were 14 commanders in Total War: Arena. There were three unlocked for free from the start of the game, while the rest could be purchased or earned through in-game currency.

== Reception ==
Total War: Arena garnered generally positive reviews, and holds an average of 75/100 on aggregate website Metacritic.
