= Rugby World Cup 2015 (video game) =

2015 video game

- Cover art featuring the Webb Ellis Cup
- Developer: HB Studios
- Publishers: Bigben Interactive, Plug In Digital
- Platforms: Microsoft Windows, PlayStation 3, PlayStation 4, PlayStation Vita Xbox 360, Xbox One
- Release: WW: 4 September 2015
- Genres: Sports, simulation
- Modes: Single player, Multiplayer

Rugby World Cup 2015 is a rugby union video game developed by HB Studios.

The game is the official video game of the 2015 Rugby World Cup, and was released worldwide on Microsoft Windows, PlayStation 3, PlayStation 4, PlayStation Vita, Xbox 360 and Xbox One on 4 September 2015.

Game modes include the official Rugby World Cup tournament and a Custom Cup mode allowing players to create their own version of the tournament. All twenty teams that have qualified for the 2015 Rugby World Cup appear, but only ten of them are fully licensed. The England team is one of those unlicensed due to their likeness already appearing on rival game Rugby Challenge 3. An edit function allows fake player names for unlicensed teams to be edited, but these only apply for exhibition and custom cup modes, the Rugby World Cup game mode retains the fake names.

Using the same control system that had been implemented in Rugby 15, the game has been overwhelmingly panned by reviewers. The lack of official squad licensing, no licensed stadiums, absence of an online game mode, poor graphics and outdated gameplay presentation has also not gone unnoticed.

== Reception ==
Rugby World Cup 2015 was universally panned by critics, with reviews noting that the game contained few improvements over HB Studios' similarly-criticized Rugby 15—and believing that the game was rushed so that it could be released in time for the tournament itself.

IGN gave the game a 1.5 out of 10, noting major bugs, that the game's AI was still poorly implemented, that it still used pre-determined outcomes for tackles, and that while less buggy than the same system in Rugby 15, the ruck implementation had an "emphasis on speediness [that] results in a lot of frustration and an overall lack of control." In conclusion, it was felt that the game was essentially a re-branded version of Rugby 15 rushed out in time for the actual World Cup. A reviewer also noted that a feature which uses statistical data to simulate matches between two sides sometimes resulted in implausible results, arguing that "nobody is going to complain if one-thousand times out of one-thousand South Africa crushes Japan" because "in no reality does that happen". Ironically, during the actual Rugby World Cup, Japan would notably upset South Africa in an opening round match.

Gamesradar was somewhat more positive on Rugby World Cup 2015 in comparison to Rugby 15, noting some improvements to the overall gameplay and mechanics that made the game feel more like actual rugby union, including television-styled instant replays, and being "the first rugby title in years which rewards running hard and straight, rather prancing sideways in an attempt to glitch past defences". However, the game was otherwise criticized for otherwise only featuring minor improvements over Rugby 15, commenting that "there's nothing here that suggests an understanding of scrums—which is forgivable, since most international referees don't either—but there's certainly no attempt to twist the complex battle of binding, shoving and probably-biting into something that belongs in a game. Instead, it's reduced to 'hook' and 'push'." It was also pointed out that half of the game's teams (including, ironically, tournament host England) were not licensed and thus composed of fictional players, and that none of the tournament's actual venues were featured either. Giving Rugby World Cup 2015 2 out of 5 stars, what improvements were present in the game were considered "nothing more than a fig leaf which barely covers the game's otherwise gruesome nudity."
