= PGA Tour 2K25 =

2025 video game

- Developer: HB Studios (Note: Additional work by 2K Vegas)
- Publisher: 2K
- Series: PGA Tour 2K
- Engine: Unity
- Platforms: Microsoft Windows; PlayStation 5 Xbox Series X/S; Nintendo Switch 2
- Release: Windows, PlayStation 5, Xbox Series X/S; February 28, 2025; Nintendo Switch 2; February 6, 2026
- Genre: Sports
- Modes: Single-player, multiplayer

PGA Tour 2K25 is a sports video game developed by HB Studios and published by 2K for Microsoft Windows, PlayStation 5 and Xbox Series X/S. It is the sixth installment of the PGA Tour 2K series. It was released on Nintendo Switch 2 on February 6, 2026.

== Reception ==
Reception

Aggregate scores
Aggregator	Score
Metacritic	(PC) 79/100 (PS5) 80/100 (XSXS) 78/100
OpenCritic	81% recommend

Review scores
Publication	Score
Hardcore Gamer	4/5
IGN	8/10
Shacknews	8/10

PGA Tour 2K25 received "generally favorable" reviews, according to review aggregator Metacritic. Fellow review aggregator OpenCritic assessed that the game received strong approval, being recommended by 81% of critics.

The Academy of Interactive Arts & Sciences nominated PGA Tour 2K25 for "Sports Game of the Year" at the 29th Annual D.I.C.E. Awards.
