= NBA Baller Beats =

2012 video game

- Retail package with the included ball and Deron Williams on the game case.
- Developer: HB Studios
- Publisher: Majesco
- Platform: Xbox 360
- Release: NA: September 11, 2012
- Genre: Rhythm
- Modes: Single-player, multiplayer

NBA Baller Beats is a rhythm game developed by HB Studios and released by Majesco on the Xbox 360 for use with the Kinect motion sensing controller. Unlike most rhythm games that revolve around dancing or playing musical instruments, NBA Baller Beats instead has players dribbling a basketball to the rhythm of popular music. The game is officially licensed by the National Basketball Association (NBA) and is bundled with a replica Spalding basketball. Deron Williams is the cover athlete for the game.

The game received above-average reviews, with critics commenting that the game can improve basketball handling skills. However, concerns were raised with playing the game in a small room, as well as noise issues from both the game and the bouncing ball. Despite being well received, NBA Baller Beats did not sell well and was attributed to Majesco posting decreased earnings for 2012.

== Gameplay ==
Players dribble the ball according to onscreen instructions for points; in-game environments feature actual NBA team logos.

In the game, various instructions to handle the basketball scroll down a lane on screen. Players are instructed to handle the ball various ways, including dribbling it in the left or right hand, passing it from one hand to another, dribbling between legs or faking a pass, all to the rhythm of the in-game music. The more accurate and timely the player's motions are, the more points are awarded. In this respect, the game has been considered as a possible way to teach basic basketball handling skills to novices. A tutorial mode called "Beat School" can assist players with the various moves.

Players can choose an NBA team and play in an environment adorned with that team's logo. Various unlockable content is also available, including in-game posters, trading cards and highlight videos for each team's players. Three different skill levels can be chosen - Rookie, Pro and Baller. Songs can be played in different venues, including a basketball court, beach and an amusement park. The in-game environments visually react to the beats of each song. In addition to the game's single player mode, there is also a versus mode in which players switch out at different points of the match.

== Development and promotion ==
The game was developed by the Halifax division of HB Studios, which closed after development on the game was completed. The developers wanted to use an actual basketball for gameplay and programmed the game to pick up the motion of a basketball along with the motion of players.

A playable demo was exhibited at E3 2012. In addition to having Deron Williams as the cover athlete, former NBA player Kenny Smith as well the WNBA's New York Liberty were tapped to market the game. Smith also provided narration for the in-game tutorial.

== Soundtrack ==
The game features a variety of popular music tracks:

- "Access Hollywood" – Consequence
- "Amazing" – Kanye West ft. Young Jeezy
- "Another One Bites the Dust" – Queen
- "Autobiotics" – Calling All Cars
- "Bangarang" – Skrillex ft. Sirah
- "Blue Sky" – Common
- "Bust a Move" – Young MC
- "Canon" – Justice
- "Championship Fever" – Najee
- "Chillin" – Wale ft. Lady Gaga
- "C'Mon Catch 'Em By Surprise" – Tiësto vs. Diplo ft. Busta Rhymes
- "Disparate Youth" – Santigold
- "Don't Sweat the Technique" – Eric B. & Rakim
- "Get Ur Freak On" – Missy Elliott
- "It's OK" – Cee Lo Green
- "It's Tricky" – Run DMC
- "Let It (Edit Remix)" – Machine Drum ft. Melo X
- "Music Makes Me Feel So Good" – Static Revenger
- "New Fang" – Them Crooked Vultures
- "Night by Night" – Chromeo
- "Obstacle 1" - Interpol
- "O.N.E." – Yeasayer
- "Party Rock Anthem" – LMFAO ft. Lauren Bennett and GoonRock
- "Roll Up" – Wiz Khalifa
- "Satellite" – Rise Against
- "Slam" – Onyx
- "So Good" – B.o.B
- "Stylo" – Gorillaz
- "Surf Hell" – Little Barrie
- "Tightrope" – Janelle Monáe

== Reception ==
Reception

Aggregate score
Aggregator	Score
Metacritic	73/100

Review scores
Publication	Score
Electronic Gaming Monthly	7.5/10
GameRevolution	7/10
GameSpot	7/10
GameZone	7.5/10
Joystiq	3.5/5
Official Xbox Magazine (US)	7.5/10

The game received "mixed or average reviews" according to the review aggregation website Metacritic. Some reviewers pointed out that the game could improve basketball handling skills. The New York Daily News said that the game "Actually can make you a better ball-handler", while Official Xbox Magazine said that players "definitely learn moves and increase your skills even if you never graduate past the Rookie difficulty level", and a reviewer for GameZone wrote that the game "will undoubtedly help you with ball control." While the Daily News admitted that the game was playable in a living room even on a carpeted floor, all three reviews raised concerns about playing in a small space and possible noise issues with neighbors. GameRevolution echoed those concerns, while admitting that it does improve player's skills but also commenting that the game was not worth the full retail price. GameSpot also commented that the game might not be worth the price, citing the lack of content and the repetitive gameplay, writing "there's not enough variety to keep you invested in the long term." Nevertheless, they had a positive impression of the game as a teaching tool, calling the title a "refreshing if flawed take on the rhythm genre."

The game sold only 3,000 units in its initial month of release. The title's lower than expected sales figures were cited as a cause of Majesco's decreased earnings for 2012.
