= Rugby 2005 =

2005 video game

- Australian PlayStation 2 cover featuring Wallabies' player George Smith.
- Developer: EA Canada
- Publisher: EA
- Platforms: PlayStation 2, Xbox, Windows
- Release: NA: March 11, 2005 (PS2, Xbox); EU: March 18, 2005
- Genre: Sports
- Modes: Single-player, multiplayer

Rugby 2005 is a game in the Rugby series by EA Sports. The game allows players to play as many Rugby nations, both major and minor, and includes many tournaments, such as the Rugby World Cup, the Tri Nations, the Six Nations, and the Super 12.

The newer version of this game is Rugby 06, also by EA Sports. It also includes a fictional "World League" where teams from the Guinness Premiership, Celtic League, Top 14, Super 12, and other domestic leagues compete against each other in a three-stage promotion and regulation structure with a knock out cup also contested. Commentary is provided by Ian Robertson and Murray Mexted.

Rugby 2005 is the first EA Rugby title for Xbox, while the Windows version was canceled in the US.

== Development ==
Rugby 2005 was developed by HB Studios and produced by EA Canada as a follow-up to Rugby 2004. Electronic Arts announced the game in January 2005 for PlayStation 2, Xbox and Windows. The game incorporated a substantially upgraded graphics engine, motion-captured player animations, enhanced lighting and more detailed stadiums. Gameplay additions included on-the-fly play calling, an improved kicking system and the use of the right analogue stick for evasive moves and tackles.

== Reception ==
Rugby 2005 received generally positive reviews. On Metacritic, the Xbox version received a score of 75 out of 100 based on 20 reviews, while the PlayStation 2 version received 71 out of 100 based on 15 reviews.

Reception

Aggregate score
Aggregator	Score		
Aggregator	PC	PS2	Xbox
Metacritic	N/A	71/100	75/100

Review scores
Publication	Score		
Publication	PC	PS2	Xbox
GamePro	N/A	3.5/5	3.5/5
GameSpot	N/A	7.1/10	7.1/10
GameSpy	N/A	3.5/5	3.5/5
GameZone	N/A	8.3/10	8.2/10
IGN	N/A	8/10	8/10
Official U.S. PlayStation Magazine	N/A	2.5/5	N/A
Official Xbox Magazine (US)	N/A	N/A	7.2/10
PC Gamer (UK)	49%	N/A	N/A
PlayStation: The Official Magazine	N/A	6.5/10	N/A
X-Play	N/A	3/5	3/5
BBC Sport	85%	85%	85%
The Sydney Morning Herald	N/A	4/5	N/A

GameSpot awarded the game 7.1 out of 10. The reviewer praised its fast pace, selection of real-world teams and responsive controls, but criticised aspects of the artificial intelligence, repetitive commentary and the game's limited explanation of some of rugby's more complicated rules and tactics. The review concluded that the game was likely to appeal most strongly to existing rugby supporters, while still providing newcomers with an introduction to the sport.

Criticism was nevertheless directed at several technical and presentational elements. GameSpot noted weaknesses in computer-controlled player behaviour, occasional clipping and unnatural animations, as well as repetitive commentary.

== Commercial performance ==
In the United Kingdom, Rugby 2005 entered Chart-Track's full-price software chart at number 10 in week 11 of 2005. It rose to number six the following week, and remained within the top 20 at number 13 in week 14.

== Legacy ==
Retrospective assessments have recognised Rugby 2005 as an improvement over its predecessor. In a 2023 history of rugby union video games, RugbyPass described the game as a marked improvement over Rugby 2004, highlighting its improved graphics and smoother gameplay.

In 2016, MyGaming included Rugby 2005 in its selection of the best rugby video games, describing it as the basis for the improvements subsequently introduced in Rugby 06. The publication highlighted its new graphics engine, motion-captured players and inclusion of the Super 12 competition.

In 2018, Guinness World Records compared the critical reception of rugby video games that had received at least 20 professional reviews. Rugby 2005 had a GameRankings average of 74.5%, placing it behind only Rugby (75.56%) and Rugby 08 (74.87%) among the qualifying games.
