= PGA Tour 2K21 =

- Cover art featuring Justin Thomas
- Developer: HB Studios
- Publisher: 2K
- Series: PGA Tour 2K
- Engine: Unity
- Platforms: Microsoft Windows; Nintendo Switch; PlayStation 4 Xbox One; Google Stadia
- Release: Stadia, Microsoft Windows, PlayStation 4, Xbox One: WW: August 21, 2020; Nintendo Switch: NA: August 21, 2020; EU: September 25, 2020
- Genre: Sports
- Modes: Single-player, multiplayer

PGA Tour 2K21 is a sports video game developed by HB Studios and published by 2K for Microsoft Windows, Nintendo Switch, PlayStation 4 and Xbox One. It is the fourth installment of the PGA Tour 2K series, formerly known as The Golf Club.

The game carries over features from the Golf Club franchise (such as Societies and the course editor) while adding additional assists and an expanded PGA Tour license over The Golf Club 2019 (with additional courses and likenesses of tour players as opponents.

PGA Tour 2K21 received generally favorable reviews, with critics feeling that the game preserved the realism of its predecessors, while adding more difficulty levels and assists to make it more accessible to a wider audience.

The online servers for the game were shut down on October 30, 2025.

== Development ==
PGA Tour 2K21 is a spiritual continuation of HB Studios' The Golf Club series, which 2K Sports acquired the publishing rights for in 2018. 2K would later acquire HB Studios outright in 2021.

While The Golf Club 2019 featured a PGA Tour license for a group of six TPC courses and a career mode (with the Tour maintaining its existing license with EA Sports at the time, dormant since 2015's Rory McIlroy PGA Tour), 2K21 includes 15 courses, as well as 12 professionals (including cover athlete Justin Thomas) who can appear as opponents. In-game broadcast presentation was updated, with new commentators Luke Elvy and Rich Beem.

== Reception ==
Reception

Aggregate scores
Aggregator	Score
Metacritic	(NS) 72/100 (PC) 74/100 (PS4) 76/100 (XONE) 78/100
OpenCritic	72% recommend

Review scores
Publication	Score
Electronic Gaming Monthly	4/5
Game Informer	8/10
GameSpot	8/10
GamesRadar+	3.5/5
Hardcore Gamer	4/5
IGN	7/10
Nintendo Life	7/10
Nintendo World Report	7.5/10
Push Square	7/10
VG247	4/5

PGA Tour 2K21 received "generally favorable reviews" on all platforms, except for the Nintendo Switch and PC versions which received "mixed or average reviews", according to review aggregator Metacritic. Fellow review aggregator OpenCritic assessed that the game received strong approval, being recommended by 72% of critics. The game has sold around 3 million units, as of May 2022.

Owen S. Good of Polygon felt that the game addressed almost all of his criticisms of The Golf Club 2019, and that its assists "[gave] me the certainty of knowing that when my shot goes awry, I did something wrong. Moreover, I know what I did wrong, and the game no longer feels arbitrary or punitive."

Tristan Ogilvie of IGN similarly noted that given the reputation of The Golf Club as being an "uncompromisingly hardcore simulation" of golf (to the point that comparisons were made to FromSoftware games), the difficulty modes and assist options allowed players to achieve a more balanced experience. Among criticisms were its "static" environments, a lack of any women's tour or tournament options, such as LPGA events, or any licensed female players (although female golfers can still be created), the included PGA Tour characters not being playable, as well as levelling and rival systems that felt "arbitrary". In conclusion, it was felt that the game as a whole was the "most flexible and enjoyable golf game since EA’s Tiger Woods series was at its peak".

Barring "minor annoyances" such as its handling of rough, repetitive commentary, none of the tour professionals being playable in-game, and its use of micro-transactions, GameSpot felt that PGA Tour 2K21 was "the most realistic and pure golf experience in a game to date", preserving key aspects of The Golf Club while making it more accessible to a wider variety of players.

During the 24th Annual D.I.C.E. Awards, the Academy of Interactive Arts & Sciences nominated PGA Tour 2K21 for "Sports Game of the Year".
