= Assault Android Cactus =

2015 video game

- Developer: Witch Beam
- Publisher: Witch Beam
- Composer: Jeff van Dyck
- Engine: Unity
- Platforms: Windows, OS X, Linux, PlayStation 4, Xbox One, Switch
- Release: Windows, OS X, Linux; 23 September 2015; PS4; 8 March 2016; Xbox One; 7 November 2017; Switch; 8 March 2019
- Genre: Multidirectional shooter
- Modes: Single-player, multiplayer

Assault Android Cactus is a twin-stick shooter developed and published by Witch Beam. The game was released for Windows, OS X, and Linux in 2015, PlayStation 4 in 2016, Xbox One in 2017, and Nintendo Switch in 2019. An enhanced version for the Switch was released in 2019 as Assault Android Cactus+.

== Gameplay ==
Assault Android Cactus is a twin-stick shooter played primarily from a quarter-down perspective. The player takes control of one of nine Androids, the first of which being Cactus, an Interplanetary Police Department (IPPD) junior constable, who crashes her ship into a space freighter 'Genki Star'. The player must fight through hordes of rogue robots to take back control of the Genki Star. The game can be played in single-player or in local cooperative play with up to four players. The game features four game modes: a story, campaign, a challenging 50 layer mode, Infinity Drive, daily challenges, Daily Drive, and boss rush mode. The game has nine playable androids to choose from, each of which have a different combination of primary and secondary weapons. The game includes 25 stages which morph and transform as the level progresses.

== Development ==
Assault Android Cactus was developed and published by Brisbane-based video game development studio Witch Beam. One of the game's developers, Sanatana Mishra noted that the team's decision to not launch the game on Xbox One video game console was due to the ID@Xbox parity clause which required developers to launch their games on Xbox One the same day as other platforms.

== Release ==
The development team were originally targeting a January 2014 release for Assault Android Cactus. However the game was officially released for Windows, OS X, and Linux on 23 September 2015, after launching from early access. A PlayStation 4 version was released on 8 March 2016. The game was initially in development for the PlayStation Vita and Wii U but did not release on those platforms. The game, with Xbox One X enhancements which include native 4K 60fps support and an optional developer commentary, was released on 7 November 2017.

Announced in February 2019, an expanded port for the Nintendo Switch known as Assault Android Cactus+ was released on 8 March 2019.

== Reception ==
Reception

Aggregate scores
Aggregator	Score
Metacritic	79/100 (PC); 85/100 (PS4)
OpenCritic	83/100; 80% Critics Recommend

Review scores
Publication	Score
Destructoid	9/10
GameRevolution	3.5/5
IGN	8.8/10
The Escapist	4/5
Hardcore Gamer	3.5/5
Push Square	7/10
Slant Magazine	4/5

Assault Android Cactus received "generally favorable" reviews from critics according to review aggregator website Metacritic.

=== Accolades ===
Assault Android Cactus won the award for "Best Action Game" at Intel Level Up 2013.
