= Mauro Bergamasco =

Italy international rugby union player

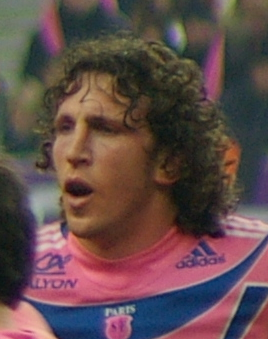
- Bergamasco playing for Stade Français, 2007
- Born: Mauro Bergamasco; 1 May 1979 (age 47) Padua, Italy
- Height: 1.85 m (6 ft 1 in)
- Weight: 98 kg (15 st 6 lb)
- Notable relative(s): Arturo Bergamasco (father); Mirco Bergamasco (brother)
- Occupation: Professional rugby union footballer

Rugby union career
- Position(s): Flanker, Scrum-half, Wing
Senior career
Years	Team	Apps	(Points)
1997–2000	Petrarca	14	(10)
2000–2003	Benetton Treviso	53	(45)
2003–2011	Stade Français	138	(80)
2011–2012	Aironi	8	(0)
2012–2015	Zebre	52	(5)
- Correct as of 28 August 2015
International career
Years	Team	Apps	(Points)
2011	Italy A	2	(0)
1998–2015	Italy	106	(75)
- Correct as of 4 October 2015

Mauro Bergamasco (born 1 May 1979) is an Italian former rugby union player who last played for Zebre. He predominantly played as an open-side flanker, although he also played a number of international games on the wing, and once started at scrum-half. He was considered to be one of Italy's best players in his preferred position.

His younger brother Mirco is also a professional rugby player. Both brothers are featured on the cover of the Italian version of the EA Sports game Rugby 08.

== Early life ==
Mauro Bergamasco was born in Padua into a rugby family; his father Arturo gained four caps for the Italian national side between 1973 and 1978, whilst his brother, Mirco, has also won caps for the Italian national team. Bergamasco cites his father as the main reason for his interest in rugby: as a young boy, he would accompany his father to the training sessions of rugby club Selvazzano, the team Arturo coached.

== Playing career ==
Bergamasco began his playing career with Petrarca Padova, before moving to Treviso.

In 2003, he moved to France with his younger brother to play for Stade Français, reportedly negotiating a contract for his brother Mirco without telling him. The brothers went on to win two French championships.

Mauro joined RaboDirect Pro12 side, Aironi Rugby on 5 December 2011.

== International career ==
He made his international debut at the age of 19 against the Netherlands and soon became a key member of the Italian squad.

In 2003, Italy's coach John Kirwan deployed him as a winger, comparing his speed and physical stature with Jonah Lomu. Bergamasco continued to insist that his best position was on the flank, and later re-established himself in that position.

Bergamasco was banned for four weeks in 2007 for hitting Wales fly half Stephen Jones in a Six Nations match and again for 13 weeks after gouging the eyes of Lee Byrne in the corresponding fixture the following year.

For the 2009 Six Nations match against England, he was chosen to play at scrum-half thanks to three alternatives being injured, but was substituted at half time after making mistakes which directly led to three England tries. He was returned to his normal starting position at flanker for the following week's fixture against Ireland.

He missed the 2011 Six Nations Championship due to an injury, but was called for the 2011 Churchill Cup to the experienced Italy A, as a preparation for the upcoming 2011 Rugby World Cup. Italy A would finish in 3rd place.

Although not in the original Italian squad for the 2013 Six Nations Championship, he was called up by coach Jacques Brunel after Sergio Parisse was sent off, facing the possibility of at least a six-week ban for insulting a match official during a club game mid-6 Nations Championship.

For the 2015 Rugby World Cup, he became the second player in history to have played five World Cups, reaching the Samoan Brian Lima. He announced his retirement from professional rugby after Italy's final game of the tournament.

== Honours ==
(France) Stade Français

- Top 14: 2003–04, 2006–07
