= Spartan: Total Warrior =

2005 video game

- Developer: Creative Assembly
- Publisher: Sega
- Producers: Luci Black; Jonathan Court; Moran Paldi
- Designer: Clive Gratton
- Programmer: Clive Gratton
- Artists: Alistair Hope; Jude Bond
- Writers: Michael de Plater; Sophie Blakemore
- Composer: Jeff van Dyck
- Series: Total War
- Platforms: GameCube; PlayStation 2; Xbox
- Release: EU: October 7, 2005; AU: October 14, 2005; NA: October 25, 2005
- Genre: Hack and slash
- Mode: Single-player

Spartan: Total Warrior is a 2005 hack and slash game for GameCube, PlayStation 2, and Xbox. Developed by Creative Assembly and published by Sega, it was released on all platforms in October. It is a spin-off of the Total War series.

The game tells an ahistorical story focusing on the "Spartan", a Spartan warrior fighting alongside his Greek allies against the invading Roman Empire. An orphan with no knowledge of his true identity, Spartan is secretly guided by Ares, who has promised him aid during the conflict, and information as to his identity after it. In return, Spartan must help Ares achieve an unspecified revenge on someone.

Total Warrior is the only installment in the Total War series to have been released for video game consoles rather than PCs or Macs. It was the first Total War game published by Sega. The game originated in an examination of whether or not it would be possible to make a "true" Total War game work on a console. When Creative Assembly realised it would not, they decided to go in a different direction; making an action game within the traditions of the series, but one that would push console hardware to its limits.

The game was well received, with critics praising the combat mechanics, game engine, controls, and, especially, the game's sense of scale. Common points of criticism included a high difficulty level, unfair boss battles, and repetitive combat. Some critics also found the game to be something of a glorified button-masher.

== Gameplay ==
Spartan Total Warrior is a hack and slash game played from a third-person perspective. The player character has two main types of attack; a simple attack which damages one enemy and a radial attack which damages multiple enemies. The simple attack is fast and causes more damage; the radial attack is slower and deals moderate damage.

Combat in Spartan: Total Warrior. The player's health meter and current weapon is on the top left. On the top right is the health meter and name of the currently targeted enemy.

The game's combat tends to focus on large battles with multiple combatants. A crucial component of the gameplay is blocking incoming attacks in between offensive blows, hence the player must balance offence and defense. The player's shield can also be used offensively to shove enemies back (the player has the option to shove back a single enemy a good distance, or perform a radial shove, pushing a group of enemies back a small distance). This allows the player to interrupt an enemy's block or to shove enemies off ledges. Shield attacks are especially important for fighting enemies who themselves have shields, as shield attacks can knock them off balance briefly, leaving them open to attack. The player can also execute a shield-break attack by jumping towards an enemy and attacking. Another move available to the player is an evasive roll. When an enemy has been knocked to the ground, the player can perform a one-hit finishing move, which differs with each weapon.

The player begins the game with a sword, shield, and basic bow, but as the story progresses, new weapons are unlocked, each of which comes with its own unique strengths and weaknesses. The Blades of Athena are dual swords which are considerably faster, but somewhat weaker, than the single sword. The Shield of Medusa can turn enemies into stone. The Bow of Power can set enemies on fire. The war hammer Death-Biter is very strong, but slow. The Spear of Achilles has a long reach and deals significant damage, but is cumbersome to wield. The player character also grows in strength as the game progresses. At the end of each level, he is awarded tokens which he can use to increase his damage, health and magic.

As the character lands attacks, a rage meter fills, which, when full, can be used to unleash more powerful attacks. Each weapon has its own specific rage attack, and the player has a choice between an individual rage attack or a radial rage attack. Magic in the game is in the form of the "Power of the Gods." When the player's magic tank is full, the player can use single or radial magic attacks, with each weapon having a specific magical power linked to each attack. For example, the Blades of Athena's radial magic attack strikes all enemies on screen with lightning, causing moderate damage to each enemy. On the other hand, the Blades of Athena's single magic attack causes a single enemy to explode.

== Story ==
It is 300 BC and the Roman Empire has conquered most of Greece. Overseen by Emperor Tiberius from Rome, the only remaining holdout against the Romans is the city-state of Sparta. As the game begins, the Spartan king, Leonidas, is preparing his soldiers for an attack. One such soldier is a man known only as the Spartan, an orphan with no knowledge of his true identity, who was raised to be a soldier due to his exceptional combat skills. Waiting for the attack, Spartan hears the voice of Ares, God of War, who offers him a deal; he will aid Spartan in defeating the Romans and reveal his true identity in return for Spartan delivering an act of unspecified revenge.

Led by General Crassus, the Romans attack with Talos, a mechanised bronze giant. However, Spartan and his closest friends, the brothers Castor and Pollux, are able to destroy the machine. That night, Ares instructs Spartan to infiltrate the Roman camp and recover the Blades of Athena, lost since the Trojan War. Accompanied by Castor, Spartan is successful, and during the raid, they encounter Electra, Princess of the Amazons. Back in Sparta, she tells Leonidas that the Romans have built a powerful new weapon, and shortly thereafter, Crassus reveals a weapon powered by an imprisoned Medusa, capable of turning entire phalanxes to stone in a split second. Spartan fights his way to Medusa, destroying the weapon and killing Crassus.

Ares then instructs Spartan to go to the ruins of Troy and recover the Spear of Achilles. Accompanied by Castor, Pollux, and Electra, Spartan soon encounters Sejanus, the Praetorian prefect. Sejanus says that Crassus underestimated Spartan, a mistake he has no intention of making. Spartan fights his way through the ruins, forced to battle a clone of himself and subsequently defeating the Hydra. With the Spear in Spartan's possession, Sejanus reveals that Sparta has fallen and Leonidas is dead.

Crestfallen, the group heads to Athens, seeking the advice of the scientist Archimedes. Spartan protects Archimedes from Roman assassins, saves several resistance members from execution, and leads the people of Athens in a rebellion, storming Sejanus and the Praetorian Guard's base. Pollux attacks Sejanus but is swiftly killed. Sejanus then turns him into a zombie whom Castor is forced to fight whilst Spartan and Electra battle Sejanus and the dragon Ladon. They are victorious, freeing Athens from Roman dominion.

Leaving Electra to oversee Pollux's funeral, Spartan and Castor head to the Gates of Saturn, a heavily guarded fortress in the Alps through which they must pass to get to Rome. There they encounter an undead Sejanus, who has been resurrected through necromancy. Spartan is able to kill Sejanus's priestesses, who are the source of his power. He then battles Sejanus, killing him for good.

Spartan and Castor continue on to Rome and meet Electra, with Spartan planning to use the catacombs to get into the Colosseum. En route, he fights and defeats an escaped Minotaur, and eventually makes his way to Tiberius, who commits suicide out of fear of an unknown "master."

Spartan is then confronted by Ares, who tells him that he is the son of one of Aphrodite's handmaidens. The handmaiden had revealed Ares's affair with Aphrodite to her husband, Hephaestus, and Ares killed her in revenge. However, he was banished by the other gods. Knowing Ares would also want to kill the handmaiden's son, the gods hid the baby in Sparta and granted him superhuman powers so as to protect himself should Ares ever locate him. Unable to find the child, Ares manipulated Tiberius and orchestrated the Roman invasion of Greece, knowing the war would bring the man to the forefront because of his abilities. The revenge which Ares seeks is the death of Spartan himself. Ares and Spartan fight, with Spartan killing the god. Joined by Castor and Electra, they celebrate the fall of the Empire as Castor, now king of Sparta, labels Spartan "a warrior, a hero, a legend."

== Development ==
=== Announcement and demos ===
Spartan: Total Warrior was announced at the Game Developers Conference in March 2005. Sega revealed they had partnered with Creative Assembly to publish a console spin-off of the Total War series, marking the first time Creative Assembly had worked on a console-exclusive game. Set for release on the GameCube, PlayStation 2, and Xbox, the game was promoted as more action-orientated than the real-time tactics games that make up the series, with the player controlling a single warrior throughout the campaign, rather than commanding a legion. Scott A. Steinberg, Sega of America's vice president of marketing, lauded the game as offering "both dynamic, real-time combat sequences and epic-sized battles; a combination that has never been accomplished on this generation of hardware." The following day, Sega announced they had purchased Creative Assembly as part of their strategy "to strengthen [their] emphasis on the western market."

More information about the game was revealed prior to the E3 event in May where two non-playable demo sections were shown; a section from the opening level with the Romans using siege towers to try to get into Sparta and the battle against Crassus after he has unveiled the Medusa weapon. These demos specifically demonstrated the game engine's ability to create battles involving up to 170 soldiers, with advanced AI resulting in enemies and allies fighting one another irrespective of the player's actions. A longer demo was made available at E3 itself, showcasing the player protecting a village from a horde of invading Barbarians, the catacombs of Rome, and the Colosseum. The E3 demo won "Best Action Game" at the Best of E3 2005 Awards.

=== Technology ===
The origins of the game go back to 2002, when a small development team was put together within Creative Assembly, headed by programmer, designer, and project lead Clive Gratton. The team had a simple goal – to do a traditional Total War game on a console rather than a PC or Mac. However, they quickly discovered that because of technical limitations, the task they had set themselves was impossible. In a 2012 interview with Eurogamer, Creative Assembly director Mike Simpson explained, "we couldn't fit a Total War battlefield, with 10,000 guys, into any of the consoles. It just doesn't work. You can't fit a gallon into a pint pot, it doesn't go." As such, the team decided instead to do an action game, but one based within the tradition of the series; rather than the real-time tactics gameplay in which the player controls a commanding officer overseeing the army, in Spartan, the player would control a single soldier.

As soon as the team completed work on Rugby, they shifted focus to Spartan. The first task was to address the technical issues, and having worked on so many sports games, they were already in a position to push the technology. As Simpson explains,

the thing about sports games is that the rules of the games are set so the gameplay is set. There's no innovation there, so the only place you can innovate is technology. So the team had ended up being particularly tech-focused, and worked out ways to squeeze more performance out of the PS2, and had in their minds ways they could get a lot more performance out of it, so that kind of married up well.

With this in mind, the team set about creating a proof of concept; a demo to determine whether a console could handle hundreds of independently acting characters on-screen at once. The demo, utilising a game engine that took six months to code, consisted of 300 Roman soldiers running over a hill with a castle in the background and the player character in the middle of the group. The demo ran consistently at 60fps and had a draw distance of 750 meters, which was much deeper than Gratton had anticipated. Writer and designer Sophie Blakemore said of the technology that resulted from the demo,

we have over 170 NPC warriors onscreen, each of them fighting for his life. Every single NPC has their own AI, which includes battle tactics, attack and defence plans, pathfinding routes, etc [...] Spartan: Total Warrior is simply immense – nothing like this has been seen before on this technology. We have no intrusive fogging, no pop up, and it runs at a smooth 60fps, with 160,000 polys per frame in a kilometre-wide environment, all pre-rendered.

The technology behind the game relied heavily upon the use of a vector processor in the PlayStation 2 called Vector-unit Zero (VU0). According to Gratton, "a large chunk of this game is written in hand-coded assembly language on the vector units." Furthermore, because the CPUs of both the Xbox and GameCube are so adept, although the game was developed on PlayStation 2 technology, it transferred straight across to the other consoles. Gratton also pointed out that no middleware was used at any point during development; "it's all bespoke technology. There's nothing off the shelf in this game. And there's nothing that wasn't written specifically for this game."

=== Narrative ===
Regarding the game's concept, the team wanted to feature the Roman Empire, using historical elements they had encountered during their research for Rome: Total War, but hadn't used in that game. They then began to speculate as to who would be a good theoretical opponent for the Romans. Gratton was a fan of the mythology that has built up concerning the Battle of Thermopylae, and decided that the Spartans would be the perfect protagonists. This led the team into the realm of creating an ahistorical narrative, as the Roman Empire and the prominence of Sparta were not historically contemporaneous (the Roman Empire was founded in 27 BC, 453 years after the Battle of Thermopylae). This kind of historically inaccurate narrative, however, was not something the team committed to lightly. Gratton explains,

because of the success of the Total War brand, there are legions of fans who adore the historically accurate nature of those games – and we spent an amazing time in order to do that right. But that led to pressure being exerted on Spartan's design. Some people were always going, "That's not strictly historically accurate." It was like that, and then the moment you go "I love Ray Harryhausen." At which point everyone goes "I Give Up!" and then the design can go free [...] the moment you make that decision that you can have myth and legend in a game, it frees you up to work out how you can do that in terms of gameplay.

=== Combat mechanics ===
Although the game is played on a large scale, the designers were determined not to neglect one-on-one close combat, which led to the depth of the game's combat mechanics. According to Gratton,

we realized early on that we'd need a combat system which would allow the player to come face-to-face with a horde of enemies and have fun killing them. We also wanted fights against smaller numbers and one-on-one fights, and so we needed a very large range of techniques to dispatch enemies.

This range of choices and techniques became "the core that underlies everything." According to Gratton, "if it's a duel against one person, even if they're weak, you get to choose. You smash them in the face, then give them a couple of stabs and then they're gone."

The team was especially concerned that the game did not become a button-masher, where the player could easily win by continually and arbitrarily attacking. They also wanted to avoid the use of complex multi-button combos; "creating a UI which was simple and yet allowed access to a large variety of clearly differentiated moves was a priority." This is where the idea of radial combat and using the shield as an offensive weapon came from; the attack button performs different actions depending on which shoulder button is pressed, thus allowing the player to change their strategy instantaneously in battle.

Gratton champions the combat system's simplicity as its strongest feature;

very early on we hit upon the idea of making the shield an active component of the combat. The reality of someone fighting with a shield is that it is not simply a defensive device; it's also used in an offensive manner to bash opponents. This was perfect for managing our large numbers of enemies and gave a unique quality to the combat. It also meant that our combat elements could have control techniques in common, i.e. each of them could have a single button press for a "single enemy" attack and another alternate button press for a "multiple opponents" attack. So we now have two consistent buttons to press for attacks and two modifiers to change your weapon from the sword: shield or bow. We quickly realized that this system could be applied to all of the attacking moves to create the simple attack UI (two buttons). Modifiers are used to create the depth of moves required.

It was from their desire to have a varied but straightforward combat system that the team landed on magical attacks and rage attacks. Initially, the game featured only standard attacks, but "we wanted a set of devastating moves which would be appropriate for very tough characters such as bosses and large groups of enemies." These "devastating moves" became the Power of the Gods attacks, and although these attacks add more variety to the gameplay, they don't violate the team's insistence on simplicity; "they fit into the current control system as another alternate modifier. If you want to pull off a power move with the bow against multiple enemies simply press bow, power, and multiple. This instantly gives a very large extended move set."

However, the use of Power of the Gods attacks led to an unexpected problem, as the team realised "we seemed to have a very large gap between the standard moves and the power moves." As such, they needed some kind of intermediary attack – stronger than the standard attacks but weaker than the Power attacks. Gratton explains, "thus, the combat-charged moves were born. These moves, using the same consistent UI, allow the player to decapitate groups for the multiple opponents move and deliver a nasty surprise for the single enemy variation."

== Reception ==
Reception

Aggregate score
Aggregator	Score		
Aggregator	GameCube	PS2	Xbox
Metacritic	73/100	74/100	73/100

Review scores
Publication	Score		
Publication	GameCube	PS2	Xbox
Electronic Gaming Monthly		8.2/10	
Eurogamer		8/10	
Game Informer	7.8/10	7.8/10	7.8/10
GameSpot	7.1/10	7.1/10	7.1/10
IGN	7.9/10	7.9/10	7.9/10
Nintendo Power	8.5/10		
Official U.S. PlayStation Magazine		4/5	
Official Xbox Magazine (UK)			8/10
PlayStation: The Official Magazine		7/10	

Spartan: Total Warrior received "generally favorable reviews" across all systems; the GameCube and Xbox versions hold an aggregate score of 73 out of 100 on Metacritic, based on twenty-four and thirty-six reviews, respectively. The PlayStation 2 version holds a score of 74 out of 100, based on thirty-three reviews.

Nintendo Power's Steve Thomason scored the GameCube version 8.5 out of 10, praising the variety of mission objectives and the game's sense of scale; "it feels like you're in the middle of an epic conflict [...] Spartan offers an unparalleled sense of size and scope." Electronic Gaming Monthly scored the PlayStation 2 version 8.2 out of 10. Justin Speer scored it 7.5, criticising its linearity despite the scale of the battles; "you're not changing the course of battle — you're following it". He also criticised it as "controller-smashingly difficult." He did, however, praise the controls and sense of scale. Tom Byron scored it 8, criticising the story and protagonist. However, he was impressed with the combat, calling it "one of the most polished games I've played." Also praising the controls, he called it "a certifiable PS2 must-buy." Robert Ashley scored it 9, praising the controls and combat, and calling it "expertly crafted."

Eurogamer's Kieron Gillen scored the PlayStation 2 version 8 out of 10, praising a "scope which few PS2 games – hell, few games full stop – manage to match." He also praised the combat and the controls and was impressed with the AI. However, he found it too difficult in places and was somewhat critical of the auto-aiming, especially for long-range attacks. He concluded by referring to the game as "a whole lot of slick, entertaining violence", calling it a "compulsive joy."

Writing for the Official U.S. PlayStation Magazine, Tom Byron scored it 8 out of 10, writing, "what it lacks in flair or ease, it more than makes up for in pure gameplay mechanics." He praised the controls, level design, and the scale of the battles, with his only major criticism being the game's difficulty. Official Xbox Magazine (UK) scored it 8 out of 10. Although they felt it was a button masher ("leave your brain at the door and lube up those fingers"), they praised the graphics and the sense of scale.

IGN's Juan Castro scored it 7.9 out of 10, calling it "exhilarating and action-packed" but "mind-devastatingly annoying." He praised the combat, AI, controls, and mission variety, but was critical of the "infuriating" auto-aim, the "cheap" boss battles, and the "poorly designed" health system. He concluded by calling the game "a mixed bag of exhilarating and exasperating moments." Game Informer's Adam Biessener scored it 7.8 out of 10, praising the combat and sense of scale. He was critical of the few platforming sections, the checkpoint system, and the "frustrating to the point of idiocy" boss battles, arguing that these problems "are enough to bring Spartan down out of the "great" category."

GameSpot's Greg Mueller scored it 7.1 out of 10, calling it "a basic action game with a heavy dose of button mashing." He found the story derivative and combat repetitive, and called the graphics "about average", criticising the textures as "fuzzy and bland". However, he acknowledged the game engine's ability to "smoothly render scores of enemies onscreen at the same time." He concluded by calling it "a pretty fun, though derivative, action game that [...] could have been great." Writing for PlayStation: The Official Magazine, Gregg Sewart scored it 7 out of 10, praising the combat but criticising the linearity of the battles; "running around fighting while row upon row of your countrymen stand around looking stupid hampers the epic flow of the game."

== See also ==
- God of War - another hack and slash game centered on greek mythology from 2005
