= International Rugby League (video game) =

1997 video game

- Developer: Creative Assembly
- Publisher: Electronic Arts
- Platforms: Windows, DOS
- Release: 1996
- Genre: Sports
- Modes: Single-player, Multiplayer

International Rugby League (distributed in Australia as ARL 96) is a 1996 sports video game developed by Creative Assembly and published by Electronic Arts for Microsoft Windows and DOS.

== Gameplay ==
Gameplay screenshot

Players compete in rugby league matches in isometric perspective, featuring 20 Optus Cup teams from the Australian rugby league, 12 teams from the English rugby league and 8 international teams. Team members can be controlled using the computer keyboard or joystick, and keys are used to control whether selected players run, pass, kick or tackle. Ray Warren and Paul Vautin provide live commentary on the game.

== Reception ==
Reception

Review scores
Publication	Score
Computer Gaming World	1/5
PC Gamer (UK)	71%

PC Gamer UK felt International Rugby League was "realistic" for its range of moves and found it "well animated", but disliked its "sedate pace" and felt that its isometric perspective was not suited to tactical gameplay. Computer Gaming World faulted the game as "a wholly unsatisfying gaming experience" due to "unresponsive" controls, a "steep" learning curve, and no difficulty adjustments, although found it played "fairly smooth and looked okay".

Retrospectively describing International Rugby League as "still an excellent game" that captured the sport well, Stevivor praised the delivery of its announcer, its "tight" running and passing controls and upgraded SVGA graphics, although found the game simplistic and was "hardly an accurate simulation of rugby league tactics".

The game received a more positive response in Australia, where it was marketed as ARL 96 Rugby League. March Stepnik of Hyper awarded the PC version 86%, praising its extensive competition modes, accessible gameplay and particularly the commentary provided by Ray Warren. The magazine awarded the sound 94%, highlighting Warren's enthusiastic delivery and the game's atmospheric effects. However, Stepnik criticised the absence of real player names, the limitations of keyboard controls and the lack of significant differences in difficulty between teams. He also found Paul Vautin's commentary less entertaining than Warren's. Despite these shortcomings, Stepnik regarded the game as a successful adaptation of rugby league.
