= The Golf Club 2 =

2017 sports video game

- Developer: HB Studios
- Publisher: Maximum Games
- Series: PGA Tour 2K
- Platforms: Microsoft Windows; PlayStation 4 Xbox One
- Release: Microsoft Windows: WW: June 27, 2017; PlayStation 4, Xbox One: NA: June 27, 2017; EU: June 30, 2017
- Genre: Sports
- Modes: Single-player, multiplayer

The Golf Club 2 is a golf sports video game developed by HB Studios and published by Maximum Games for Microsoft Windows, PlayStation 4 and Xbox One. Released in 2017, it is the sequel to 2014's The Golf Club and the second installment of the PGA Tour 2K series, published by 2K. The online servers for The Golf Club 2 were shut down on February 28, 2025.

== Reception ==
Reception

Aggregate score
Aggregator	Score
Metacritic	(PS4) 76/100 (XONE) 69/100

Review scores
Publication	Score
Game Informer	8.75/10
PC Gamer (US)	71/100

The Golf Club 2 received "mixed or average reviews" for Xbox One and "generally favorable reviews" for PlayStation 4, according to review aggregator Metacritic.
