= Forts (video game) =

2017 2D real-time strategy video game

- Developer: EarthWork Games
- Publisher: EarthWork Games
- Programmer: Tim Auld
- Artist: Nick Smith
- Composers: Jeff van Dyck, Ella van Dyck
- Platform: Microsoft Windows
- Release: Windows: April 19, 2017
- Genre: Real-time strategy
- Modes: Single-player, Multiplayer

Forts is a 2D real-time strategy video game developed and published by Australian studio EarthWork Games. It was released on April 19, 2017. Forts started development in March, 2003, as a game originally based on early bridge building games. Forts had sold over a million copies as of March 9, 2022. In Forts, the player builds a base, defends it, and acquires weapons through tech trees in an attempt to destroy the opponent's reactor.

The game has been reviewed by CG Magazine and Kotaku, the former of which described Forts's gameplay as being similar to the Worms series.

== Gameplay ==
The core gameplay of Forts is similar to many real-time strategy games: build up resources, acquire new technologies, and build something to attack the opponent while defending yourself from their attacks. There are 4 different gamemodes that players can select: Campaign, Skirmish, Multiplayer, and Sandbox. The Campaign includes the tutorial, and 28 training missions which follows three super-powers as they battle it out over the last of the planet's resources, a secondary story-line if the player has bought the Moonshot DLC, and a tertiary story-line if the player has bought the High Seas DLC. Skirmishes allow players to combat AIs at 3 different levels of difficulty.

The goal of the game is to destroy the opponent's core, which can be done through direct damage, like hitting it with a laser or cannon, indirect damage, like setting fire to it or hitting it with splash damage, or through making it fall to the ground by destroying the supporting structures around it. This may sometimes require an objective to be completed, such as capturing points. There are various weapons like missiles, lasers, cannons, miniguns, and mortars to attack with, with defenses like metal reinforcement, sand bags, machine guns, and flak to shoot down projectiles and defend yourself.

Forts's multiplayer allows the player to join other player's lobbies, compete in ranked matches, and practice in community-made training missions. Sandbox allows the player to experiment in any map without AIs or other players.

The Multiplayer can hold up to 8 players per lobby in which each player is split into two teams. The match can be set to team death match where each player gets their own fort and resources, or team co-op where all players on the team shares resources and bases. There are around 70 maps that come with the game, but there are hundreds of community made maps which can be downloaded and played. Teams are able to choose one of 15 commanders from 5 different factions each with their own unique active and passive abilities, in order to augment their playstyle.

== Campaign ==
The game's campaign serves as a story mode. Each cutscene features news coverage by Facts News, hosted by Sal Vaux (a play on the word "salvo").

In the story, oil derricks around the world are falling silent, creating a resource race for undiscovered oil fields between the global superpowers, namely the Eagle Empire (a fictional version of the United States), the Dragon Army (a fictional version of the People's Republic of China), and the Iron Bear Alliance (a fictional version of the Russian Federation and/or the Soviet Union). The race becomes intense when geologists working for Black Penguin Oil claim to have discovered one last motherlode of oil.

In each level, the player must fight enemy forts to protect and/or annex oil fields across the world, mainly Eurasia.

Throughout the campaign, the player starts off playing as the Eagle Empire taking on the Dragon Army, only for their helicarrier, the ESS Extravagance, to go missing upon discovering the location of the motherlode. The player then assumes control of the Iron Bear Alliance as they take on the Eagle Empire to exploit the latter's apparent misfortune and replenish their dwindling metal and energy stockpiles, only for the same occurrence to happen to them. The player then assumes control of the Dragon Army, who take on the Iron Bear Alliance in an effort to take advantage of the seeming power vacuum, which ends with the Dragon Army discovering the motherlode as well and bringing Sal and Facts News over to the site.

The final level shows that the "motherlode" was made up by Black Penguin Oil, revealed to be a private militia, and the player's drill instructors from each military were spies working for Commander Seep, the leader of Black Penguin Oil. Seep reveals that Black Penguin Oil is taking advantage of the superpowers' constant need for resources, and they had tricked them into collecting oil for their shuttle tankers, space shuttles designed to fly them to the Moon to collect a rare metal material that is used to power the reactors used in the game, all in an elaborate plot take control of the world's economy. With no other choice, the three superpowers team up to take down Black Penguin Oil, and the ending is determined by the result of battle.

If the player loses, the superpowers' militaries have fallen, and Black Penguin Oil makes its way to the moon to claim its resources, succeeding in their plot tighten their grip on the world's economy.

If the player wins, Seep and Black Penguin Oil have fallen, and the three superpowers make their way to claim the shuttle tankers, yet it is unknown if they will either let national interests continue the resource race and evolve it into a space race or come to an agreement and share the spoils.

== Tournaments ==
On May 27, 2017, Earthwork Games started hosting their own official Forts tournaments. Community driven tournaments have been organized, of which many had the developers help out and grant an in-game badge reward to the winner.

The official tournaments are varying team sizes, and have prizes for the top three players as well as a name mention in the winners announcement. The official tournaments are viewable live or as replay from various content creators, including but not limited to Project Incursus, Boberet0 and salzwerk (German)

The latest official tournament was tournament XXII. The qualifiers were on 19 February 2022 and the tournament itself was on 26 February 2022. This was a 2 verus 2 tournament. The winner was team "Sussles", consisting of players AlexD and Firework.

Community driven tournaments are made by various players in the community and are often different from their official counterpart. One example of such is Cronkhinator's AI tournament, in which participants must use the game's AI functionality to create an AI that will battle the AI of others.

Not all tournaments are battles. The official tournaments also include Forts Map Making Contest, of which 3 have been organized this far. The winner of the latest is Pyro. In these tournaments players are tasked with creating a custom map for the game. A winner is chosen by a team of judges, often consisting of (members of) the development team and content creators.

== Post-release content ==
A remastered soundtrack DLC was launched on 20 April 2017, costing 9.99 USD. This includes the official soundtrack from the base game.

The Moonshot DLC was released on 18 June 2019, which costs 7.99 USD, it included four new weapons (Howitzers, Smoke Bombs, the Magnabeam, and the Buzzsaw.), three new commanders, portals, a new gamemode, a new HUD for teams, a unique medal that can be seen in lobby by others, and a new soundtrack.

Following the Moonshot DLC, a separate DLC for the soundtrack was released on the same date costing 4.99 USD and allows downloading of the full Moonshot soundtrack.

The Pro HUD DLC was released on 24 June 2020, which costs 2.99 USD. The Pro HUD DLC includes a new color palette in game for the weapons, materials, tech, and devices tabs, new sounds when interacting with the in-game menus, and a unique medal that can be seen in lobby by other players.

The High Seas DLC was released on 25 March 2022, which costs 9.99 USD. The main addition of the DLC is the addition of naval forts with buoyancy physics, along with six new weapons (The dome, Orbital Lasers, Planes, Decoys, Naval Missile Launchers, and Deckguns), a new ammo mechanic, a new campaign, 23 new tracks by Ella van Dyck, several new maps with 17 new dynamic backgrounds, a new HUD and a High Seas badge for all owners, 5 new mission types, and a revised learning curve for new players.

== Reception ==
Reception

Aggregate score
Aggregator	Score
Metacritic	74/100

Forts received "mixed or average" reviews, according to review aggregator Metacritic.
