= Mirco Bergamasco =

Former Italy dual-code international rugby footballer

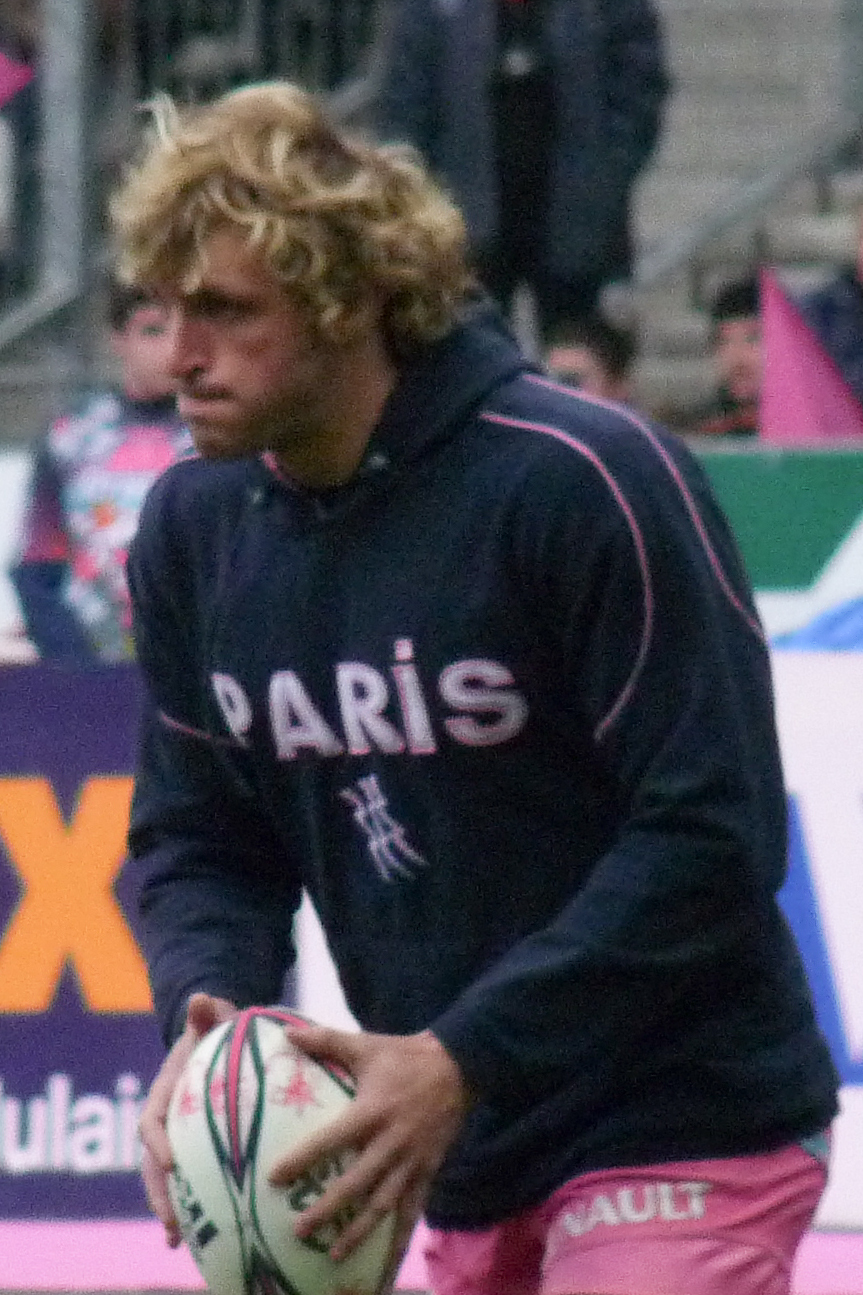
- Bergamasco with Stade Français in 2010.

Personal information
- Born: 23 February 1983 (age 43) Padua, Veneto, Italy
- Height: 1.8 m (5 ft 11 in)
- Weight: 86 kg (13 st 8 lb)

Playing information

Rugby union
- Position: Centre, Wing, Fullback
Club
Years	Team	Pld	T	G	FG	P
2001–03	Petrarca	36				45
2003–10	Stade Français	127	26	6	0	150
2010–13	Racing Métro	36	4	10	0	54
2013–14	Rovigo Delta	19	4	22	0	168
2014–16	Zebre	20	0	4	0	20
2016	Sacramento Express	12	0	21	0	117
	Total	250	34	63	0	554
Representative
Years	Team	Pld	T	G	FG	P
2002–12	Italy	89	17	49	0	256
2015	Italy Sevens	3	1	0	0	5

Rugby league
- Position: Centre
Club
Years	Team	Pld	T	G	FG	P
2016	Saluzzo Roosters
Representative
Years	Team	Pld	T	G	FG	P
2016–17	Italy	5	0	24	0	48
- As of 16 January 2021

Mirco Bergamasco (born 23 February 1983) is an Italian rugby union and rugby league footballer. Bergamasco has played both rugby league and rugby union, and is a dual-code rugby international, having played for both the Italy national rugby union team and the Italy national rugby league team. He primarily plays at centre or wing. He played in the 2003, 2007 and 2011 Rugby World Cups as well as the 2017 Rugby League World Cup.

== Playing career ==
=== Club career ===
In March 2016, Bergamasco signed with the Sacramento Express for the inaugural season of PRO Rugby.

=== International career ===
Bergamasco made his international debut against France in the 2002 Six Nations Championship, having previously appeared against an All-Star XV in a non-cap international. He established himself as a regular in the Azzurri side under coach John Kirwan. He scored three tries in the 2003 Six Nations Championship. He suffered a jaw injury during the 2003 Rugby World Cup, however, and was forced to miss all but two of Italy's games.

He switched to inside centre from the back three and was considered one of the stars of the 2006 Six Nations Championship, scoring three tries in five matches.

Though his position has primarily been that of the wing and centre, he has been one of the main goal kickers for Italy since 2011. In the 2011 Six Nations Championship match against France. Bergamasco kicked six from eight, resulting in a 22–21 win for Italy, their first win in the Six Nations against the French.

Bergamasco returned to the Italian side for the 2014 Six Nations Championship, but was not selected to play in any matches.

=== Switch to rugby league ===
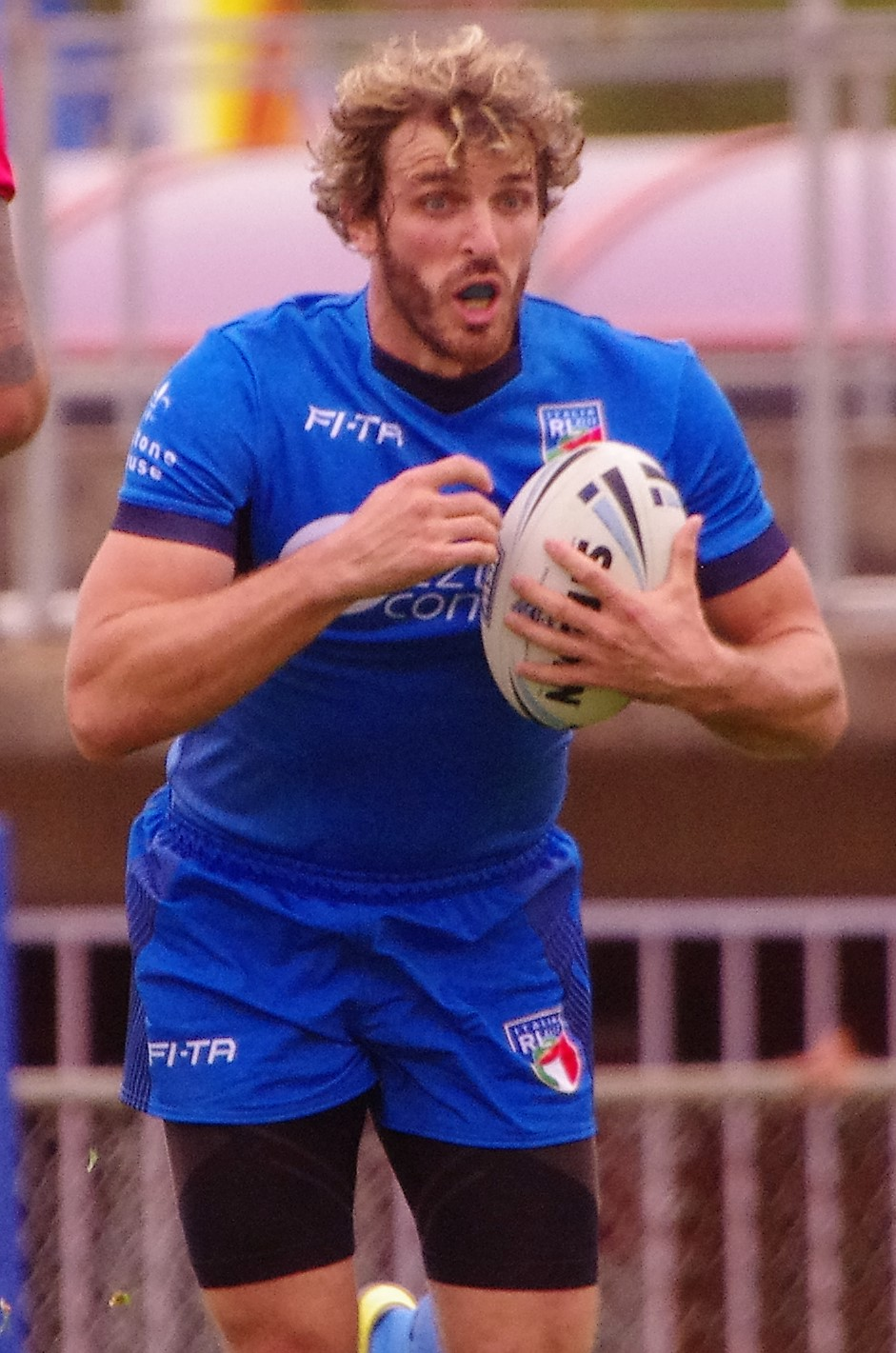
Bergamasco playing for the Italian national rugby league team in 2017.

In October 2016, Bergamasco was selected in Italy's 22-man squad for their 2017 Rugby League World Cup qualifying campaign. He played at centre in two matches, kicking 7 goals for Italy against Serbia.

In March 2017, Bergamasco joined the Saluzzo Roosters during their inaugural season in the French National Division 2 competition.

In June 2017, Bergamasco represented Italy in their matches against Lebanon and Spain, kicking 13 goals against the latter. Bergamasco kicked 4 goals in Italy's pre-World Cup match against Malta in October.

== Personal life ==
Bergamasco is the son of Arturo and the younger brother of Mauro Bergamasco, both Italian internationals.

Bergamasco appeared on the cover and in the 2004 edition of Dieux du Stade, a calendar in which French rugby players pose nude. In 2007 he and his brother featured on the cover of the Italian version of the EA Sports game Rugby 08.

Bergamasco is a vegan since 2013. In 2017 he posed nude for one of PETA's ad campaigns advocating for the vegan lifestyle.

He was married to French Iranian journalist Ati Safavi. She became a vegan before him, inspiring him. They both appeared as testimonials for the Italian animal rights organization Lega Anti Vivisezione (LAV). They divorced in 2026.
