= Hyenas (video game) =

Cancelled video game

- Developer: Creative Assembly
- Publisher: Sega
- Engine: Unreal Engine
- Platform: Microsoft Windows PlayStation 5 PlayStation 4 Xbox One Xbox Series X/S
- Release: Cancelled
- Genre: First-person shooter
- Mode: Multiplayer

Hyenas was a planned science-fiction first-person shooter developed by Creative Assembly and published by Sega. Set in a dystopian near-future, players were to take control of a space pirate known as a Hyena and compete in teams of three to raid heavily-guarded Plunderships. The game was ultimately cancelled by Sega in late September 2023, citing a low potential for profitability.

== Setting ==
Hyenas takes place in a near-future setting. After the wealthy move to Mars and turn it into a paradise for those who can afford to live there, the Earth is torn apart in an enormous accident. The survivors live miserably on a collection of orbiting slums known colloquially as The Taint. To add meaning to their vapid lives, the elites of Mars raid the ruins of Earth for Merch, pop-culture relics such as old VHS tapes or vinyl records. Players control a titular Hyena, a space-pirate from the Taint that raids enormous Plunderships on their way from Earth to Mars in an attempt to steal the Merch held within.

== Development ==
Hyenas was initially dubbed "Project Keaton" and presented internally in 2017, where it was greenlit following the critical success of Alien: Isolation, despite its commercial disappointment. Wanting a game with broader commercial appeal, the studio's management decided to create a console-based online multiplayer shooter inspired by Destiny, Escape from Tarkov and PUBG. It also drew inspiration from Apex Legends, although the development team refrained from developing a battle royale title due to the belief that genre would be dominated by experienced development teams. Hyenas was estimated to have a 5-year development time.

The game's feel was intended to be based on lovable rogues like Han Solo or the crew in Firefly, in a gritty sci-fi setting incorporating some realistic elements. It was planned to utilize the engine of Alien: Isolation, but was switched to Unreal Engine partway through development, requiring part of the team to be moved to work on Total War instead. In 2019, filmmaker Neill Blomkamp visited the development team and provided feedback on the concept, creating a mood video and influencing the creative direction of the game towards collecting valuable pop-culture artifacts and inserting Internet humor. This was said to have been welcomed by the development team, who had often felt "rudderless". Blomkamp eventually parted ways with Sega.

Hyenas was said to have been Sega's highest-budget game ever, exceeding the USD $70 million spent on Shenmue in 1999. Sega called it one of its "Super Games", ambitious titles it hoped would recoup their investment. The game was officially announced on June 22, 2022 as part of IGN's Summer of Gaming event. Announced at the same time was the first of several closed alpha tests, the first of which began on September 23. The game's first public playtest was at Gamescom in Cologne in 2023. After the game's alpha tests, Sega was unhappy with the game's progress and began providing more scrutiny, sending employees from Sega Japan to remain permanently at the developer's UK office in an unusually hands-on manner.

The game was due to release on PC, PlayStation 5, PlayStation 4, Xbox Series X/S and Xbox One. However, in early August 2023, Sega executives publicly called Hyenas' development "challenging", raising the possibility it would be cancelled, and stated they would look at "adjusting" the game's business model, possibly to free-to-play. Its development was halted by Sega on September 28, 2023 along with multiple other unannounced games, due to "lower profitability of the European region".

An anonymous developer blamed the game's failure on a lack of direction, management being "asleep at the wheel", making an unoriginal game for a saturated market, as well as the "disruptive" engine change to Unreal. They believed that, in the future, Sega would be more demanding about games they published due to the significant monetary loss of the game's cancellation.

== Reception ==
Ed Thorn of Rock Paper Shotgun was initially unimpressed by the game, calling it "obnoxious and underwhelming", but in an August 2023 preview, he stated that he came away "pleasantly surprised". Saying that he liked the combination of fast-paced team deathmatch and extraction shooter, he noted that it might have more of a chance of launch survival than he thought, but also expressing the opinion that the game would still "struggle to crack a saturated space". In another preview, Lexi Luddy of Shacknews said that the game was a "lot of fun", but expressed trepidation that it would survive, noting technical difficulties during the beta. Kelsey Raynor of VG247 said that the game was "surprisingly distinct from other shooters", noting how it paid homage to the 1980s and 1990s. Jake Tucker of TechRadar stated that the game had an "overwhelming" pace and was set apart by its bright colors and vivid costumes, which, combined with its nostalgia, gave him the impression it was designed for newcomers to extraction shooters. He said that the game was not for him, but expressed the hope it would do well for people who were fans. However, he noted that he was not sure it would find an audience as a paid game when compared to free-to-play games like Fortnite.
