= Rugby 2004 =

2003 video game

- Australian PlayStation 2 cover featuring Wallabies' player George Gregan.
- Developer: HB Studios
- Publisher: EA Sports
- Platforms: PlayStation 2, Windows
- Release: September 18, 2003: PlayStation 2; FRA: September 18, 2003; UK/AU: September 19, 2003; NA: September 23, 2003 Windows; FRA: September 18, 2003; UK: September 19, 2003; NA: October 6, 2003; AU: October 25, 2003
- Genre: Sports
- Modes: Single-player, multiplayer

Rugby 2004 is the 2003 installment of Electronic Arts' Rugby video game series. The game was developed by HB Studios, published by EA Sports, and released in 2003. The game is a follow-up to 2000's Rugby 2001, and was succeeded by Rugby 2005. Rugby 2004 features over 60 teams, over 1500 players and over 65 stadiums. The game's commentators are BBC's John Inverdale, and Channel 7's Gordon Bray. The game's soundtrack is provided by INXS. It supports up to 4 players playing on the PlayStation 2 via Multitap, and also utilises the console's online multiplayer function.

== Reception ==
Reception

Aggregate score
Aggregator	Score	
Aggregator	PC	PS2
Metacritic	55/100	61/100

Review scores
Publication	Score	
Publication	PC	PS2
Eurogamer	N/A	4/10
Game Informer	N/A	6/10
GameSpot	4.2/10	5/10
GameSpy	1/5	2/5
GameZone	5.2/10	5.5/10
IGN	7/10	7.3/10
Official U.S. PlayStation Magazine	N/A	3/5
PALGN	N/A	7/10
PC Gamer (US)	68%	N/A
PlayStation: The Official Magazine	N/A	7/10
BBC Sport	65%	65%
Maxim	N/A	8/10

The game received "mixed" reviews on both platforms according to the review aggregation website Metacritic.
