= Creative Assembly =

British video game developer

The Creative Assembly Limited
- Trade name: Creative Assembly
- Type: Subsidiary
- Industry: Video games
- Founded: 1987; 39 years ago
- Founder: Tim Ansell
- Headquarters: Horsham, England
- Key people: Gareth Edmondson (studio director)
- Products: Total War series; Alien: Isolation
- Number of employees: 882 (2023)
- Parent: Sega (2005–present)
- Subsidiaries: Creative Assembly Sofia
- Website: creative-assembly.com

The Creative Assembly Limited (trade name: Creative Assembly) is a British video game developer based in Horsham, founded in 1987 by Tim Ansell. In its early years, the company worked on porting games to MS-DOS from Amiga and ZX Spectrum platforms, later working with Electronic Arts to produce a variety of games under the EA Sports brand. In 1999, the company had sufficient resources to attempt a new and original project, proceeding to develop the strategy computer game Shogun: Total War which was a critical and commercial hit, and is regarded as a benchmark strategy game. Subsequent titles in the Total War series were built following the success of Shogun: Total War, increasing the company's critical and commercial success.

In March 2005, Creative Assembly was acquired by Sega and became part of Sega Europe. An Australian branch was operated from Fortitude Valley, Queensland as Sega Studios Australia. Under Sega, further Total War titles were developed, and Creative Assembly entered the console market with action-adventure games such as Spartan: Total Warrior, Viking: Battle for Asgard and Alien: Isolation.

== History ==
=== Founding (1987–1998) ===
Creative Assembly was founded in 1987 by Tim Ansell. (Note: Creative Assembly has cited 18 August 1987 and November 1987 as its founding dates.) Ansell had begun professional computer programming in 1985, working on video games for the Amstrad CPC, Commodore 64, and Atari 8-bit computers. Initially, Ansell kept the company small so he could personally work on computer programming. The company's early work, often produced personally by Ansell, involved porting games from the Amiga to MS-DOS, such as the 1989 titles Geoff Crammond's Stunt Car Racer and Shadow of the Beast by Psygnosis. Creative Assembly began work with Electronic Arts in 1993, producing titles under the EA Sports label, starting with the DOS version of the early FIFA games. With EA Sports, Creative Assembly was able to produce low development risk products bearing official league endorsements. The company's products included Rugby World Cup titles for 1995 and 2001, the game for the 1999 Cricket World Cup and the Australian Football League games for 1998 and 1999, of which the AFL 98 title was particularly successful in the Australian market. When it became clear that the company needed to expand further, Ansell employed Michael Simpson in 1996 as the creative director. Simpson, a microchip designer turned video game designer, later became the driving force for the creative design of the Total War series. Ansell left Creative Assembly after Sega acquired the developer in 2005. Later, Tim Heaton took over as the company's studio director.

=== Early Total War titles (1999–2004) ===
As a result of its success in sports titles, by 1999 Creative Assembly had sufficient resources and backing from Electronic Arts to develop more high risk titles in other genres. The result was Shogun: Total War, the company's breakthrough title. A blend of real-time tactics and turn-based gameplay, Shogun: Total War was announced in early 1999. The game focused the Sengoku period of Japanese feudal history, and upon its release in June 2000 it was met with critical acclaim. The game won multiple industry awards and became regarded as one of the benchmark strategy video games. Inhouse composer Jeff van Dyck won both a BAFTA and an EMMA award for his work on the game's soundtrack. In May 2001, Creative Assembly announced The Mongol Invasion, an expansion pack focusing on the earlier Mongol invasions of Japan. Released in August 2001, the expansion pack also received a positive response.

Soon after, Creative Assembly broke away from Electronic Arts, instead using Activision as a publisher and distributor. In August 2001, Creative Assembly announced a second Total War, set in the Middle Ages. Medieval: Total War was of a larger scope than Shogun: Total War, spanning a larger time period and the entirety of Medieval Europe. Released in August 2002, the game was a greater success than Shogun: Total War, becoming the best-selling video game in the UK for the first two weeks, and the fourth best-selling game in the US market in its first week. As with Shogun: Total War, Medieval: Total War won multiple industry awards, and was named the top game of 2002 by PC Gamer. Creative Assembly was awarded the "PC Game Developer of the Year" award at the 2003 European Computer Trade Show. Viking Invasion, an expansion pack focusing on the Viking invasion of Britain in the Dark Ages, was released in May 2003.

A third Total War title was announced in January 2003. Entitled Rome: Total War, the game featured a new game engine to Shogun: Total War and Medieval: Total War, and redesigned the approach to the series. Set during the late Roman Republic and preliminary decades of the Roman Empire, the game's code was used for two television shows: the BBC's Time Commanders and the History Channel's Decisive Battles. Upon release in September 2004, the game was given praise, becoming one of the year's top ten best-selling titles.

=== Buyout and later games (2005–2016) ===
Despite speculation that Activision might buy Creative Assembly, as the publisher had done with previous successful developers under its wing, the Japanese company Sega announced on 9 March 2005 that it had sealed an acquisition deal with Creative Assembly, purchasing all issued shares in the company. Sega explained that the acquisition was to strengthen Sega Europe's presence in the European and North American video game markets. All preceding titles in the Total War series had been exclusively computer games. By July 2005, Sega had acquired the publishing rights to Rome: Total War from Activision, and built on the brand strategy by releasing two expansion packs: Barbarian Invasion in September 2005 and Alexander in September 2006. Spartan: Total Warrior was released in October 2005 on Xbox, PlayStation 2 and GameCube, receiving a mixed reception from critics.

Medieval II: Total War, the fourth title in the franchise, was announced in January 2006 and developed by the Australian branch of Creative Assembly. It was a remake of the earlier Medieval: Total War using the new assets and technology behind Rome: Total War. The game was released in November 2006, and although not as successful as Rome: Total War, Medieval II: Total War was still a critical and commercial hit, holding a place in the UK games charts in November 2006, and in the US charts until the end of January 2007. An expansion pack, Kingdoms, was announced in March 2007. The expansion received a positive reception from critics upon release in August 2007.

At the Games Convention in August 2007, Creative Assembly announced new titles. The first, Viking: Battle for Asgard, was a console-exclusive title, similar in style to Spartan: Total Warrior, but focusing on Norse mythology. The game was released in March 2008. It received an average reception from critics in the industry. The second title was a fifth Total War instalment, Empire: Total War, set in the early modern period of the 18th century and early 19th century. As was the case with Rome: Total War, Empire: Total War features a redesigned approach to the series and a new game engine. It was released in March 2009, receiving high praise, selling double the number of units sold of Medieval II: Total War and Rome: Total War. However, numerous significant issues were pointed out by critics after the release. Though there were numerous patches, not all of these were addressed by the abandonment of support for the game, which caused many to question Sega's influence on Creative Assembly. In July 2008, Creative Assembly announced Stormrise. Unlike previous historically based games, Stormrise is a science fiction real-time strategy game developed for both consoles and PC, released in 2009. Stormrise received negative and mediocre responses, with criticisms focusing on broken pathfinding and the game's flawed control scheme (designed with the intent to create an easy interface for consoles). In January 2009, Creative Assembly was joined by Tim Heaton, who serves as the company's studio director.

The Australian branch of the Creative Assembly ported the first three Sonic the Hedgehog games and the Sonic & Knuckles lock-on games to Sonic Classic Collection. This compilation received overall positive reviews from Aussie-Nintendo and Official Nintendo Magazine, but criticised some speed issues when playing, rarely speeding up or slowing down and some graphical and sound glitches. Reviewers also criticised the removal of multiplayer in the games, previously available in earlier versions of the games. In 2010, the company released Napoleon: Total War, based on the exploits of Napoleon Bonaparte to generally favourable reviews that praised the tightly scripted elements of a smaller, more focused campaign than its globe-spanning predecessor, Empire Total War. The company released Total War: Shogun 2 in 2011, to universal acclaim. The title is the first to make the brand Total War the main title, in an effort to increase brand awareness.

On 6 December 2012, a partnership between Games Workshop and Creative Assembly was announced. Also announced was the creation of a new Warhammer Fantasy Battle game. On 5 April 2013, it was announced that Sega Studios Australia (formerly known as The Creative Assembly Australia) will be shut down later in the year. On 3 September 2013, Creative Assembly released Total War: Rome II. The game uses an updated Warscape engine and suffered from technical issues shortly after release which eventually led to Creative Assembly's creative director, Mike Simpson, apologising publicly for the widespread technical issues. In the ten months following release, Creative Assembly released fourteen patches for the game, solving most technical issues and balancing gameplay. As of July 2014, the game currently stands at a rating of 76/100 on Metacritic by critics.

Alien: Isolation is a first person stealth horror game based on the film Alien. The game was released on 7 October 2014 for PC, PlayStation 3, PlayStation 4, Xbox 360 and Xbox One. In 2016, the company released the game Total War: Warhammer, which was the first game in a trilogy.

=== Expansion (2017–present) ===
In February 2017, the studio released Halo Wars 2, which received positive reviews. In March 2017 Creative Assembly announced the acquisition of Crytek Black Sea, which was shut down in December 2016. This was the first studio opened by Creative Assembly abroad. The studio has been renamed to Creative Assembly Sofia.

In September 2017, the studio released the second game in the Warhammer Fantasy series, Total War: Warhammer II. In May 2018, Creative Assembly then went on to release the Thrones of Britannia, the first in its Saga Series. In February 2019, Creative Assembly announced the cancellation of Total War: Arena.

Total War: Three Kingdoms has been released as of 23 May 2019, and received positive reviews.Total War: Warhammer III was released on 17 February 2022.

On 28 September 2023, Sega announced it was cancelling Hyenas. As a result of the cancellation, an unknown number of employees were laid off from Creative Assembly. In March 2024, Sega announced it would cut 240 roles across Sega Europe, Creative Assembly and Sega HARDlight.

On December 4, 2025, Creative Assembly game director Pawel Wofs announced that the studio is developing a new game engine called "Warcore" to power the upcoming Total War: Medieval III, and stated that the team intended to share early development updates and collaborate with fans throughout the process.

== Games developed ==
| Year | Title | Platform(s) |
|---|---|---|
| 1989 | Blood Money | MS-DOS |
| 1989 | Baal | MS-DOS |
| 1989 | Stunt Car Racer | MS-DOS |
| 1990 | Infestation | MS-DOS, FM Towns |
| 1990 | Stryx | MS-DOS |
| 1993 | FIFA International Soccer | MS-DOS |
| 1994 | Microcosm | MS-DOS |
| 1994 | Rugby World Cup '95 | MS-DOS |
| 1996 | International Rugby League | MS-DOS, Windows |
| 1997 | AFL 98 | Windows |
| 1998 | AFL 99 | Windows |
| 1999 | ICC Cricket World Cup 99 | Windows |
| 2000 | Shogun: Total War | Windows |
| 2000 | Rugby | Windows, PlayStation 2 |
| 2001 | Shogun: Total War: The Mongol Invasion | Windows |
| 2002 | Medieval: Total War | Windows |
| 2003 | Medieval: Total War: Viking Invasion | Windows |
| 2004 | Rome: Total War | Android, iOS, macOS, Windows |
| 2005 | Rome: Total War: Barbarian Invasion | macOS, Windows |
| 2005 | Spartan: Total Warrior | GameCube, PlayStation 2, Xbox |
| 2006 | Rome: Total War: Alexander | macOS, Windows |
| 2006 | Medieval II: Total War | Linux, macOS, Windows |
| 2007 | Medieval II: Total War: Kingdoms | Linux, macOS, Windows |
| 2008 | Viking: Battle for Asgard | Windows, PlayStation 3, Xbox 360 |
| 2009 | Empire: Total War | Linux, macOS, Windows |
| 2009 | Stormrise | Windows, PlayStation 3, Xbox 360 |
| 2010 | Napoleon: Total War | macOS, Windows |
| 2010 | Sonic Classic Collection | Nintendo DS |
| 2011 | Total War: Shogun 2 | Linux, macOS, Windows |
| 2012 | Total War: Shogun 2: Fall of the Samurai | Linux, macOS, Windows |
| 2012 | Total War Battles: Shogun | Android, iOS |
| 2012 | London 2012 | Windows, PlayStation 3, Xbox 360 |
| 2013 | Total War: Rome II | macOS, Windows |
| 2014 | Alien: Isolation | Linux, macOS, Windows, PlayStation 3, PlayStation 4, Xbox 360, Xbox One, Nintendo Switch, Android, iOS, Amazon Luna |
| 2015 | Total War: Attila | Linux, macOS, Windows |
| 2015 | Total War: Arena | Windows |
| 2016 | Total War: Warhammer | Linux, macOS, Windows |
| 2017 | Halo Wars 2 | Windows, Xbox One |
| 2017 | Total War: Warhammer II | Linux, macOS, Windows |
| 2018 | Total War Saga: Thrones of Britannia | Linux, macOS, Windows |
| 2019 | Total War: Three Kingdoms | Linux, macOS, Windows |
| 2020 | Total War Saga: Troy | macOS, Windows |
| 2022 | Total War: Warhammer III | Linux, macOS, Windows |
| 2023 | Total War: Pharaoh | macOS, Windows |
| TBA | Alien: Isolation 2 | Nintendo Switch 2, PlayStation 5, Windows, Xbox Series X/S |
| TBA | Total War: Medieval III | TBA |
| TBA | Total War: Warhammer 40,000 | TBA |
| Cancelled | Hyenas | Originally planned for Windows, PlayStation 4, PlayStation 5, Xbox One and Xbox Series X/S; cancelled in September 2023 |
