= The Golf Club =

2014 video game

- Developer: HB Studios
- Publishers: Original: WW: HB Studios; Collector's Edition: NA: Maximum Games; EU: Ravenscourt
- Series: PGA Tour 2K
- Engine: Unity
- Platforms: Microsoft Windows; PlayStation 4 Xbox One
- Release: 2014
- Genre: Sports
- Modes: Single-player, multiplayer

The Golf Club is a golf sports video game developed and published by HB Studios for Microsoft Windows, PlayStation 4 and Xbox One, and first released in 2014.

It is the first installment of the PGA Tour 2K series, published by 2K. A sequel was released in 2017. The online servers for The Golf Club were shut down on February 28, 2025.

== Development ==
The game was developed and published by HB Studios, a studio whose primary work in the past has been contract work for annual sports releases. In particular the company had often worked with Electronic Arts and were expecting to get the contract to develop the 2015 edition of PGA Tour. However after Electronic Arts cancelled the series HB Studios decided instead to make their own golf game.

Prior to the game's release HB Studios partnered with the company Greg Norman Golf Course Design allowing them to use the game's course editor feature to present renders of courses to potential clients. The clients would then give HB Studios feedback on the game in return.

== Reception ==
Reception

Aggregate score
Aggregator	Score
Metacritic	(PC) 70/100 (PS4) 66/100 (XONE) 64/100

Review scores
Publication	Score
Game Informer	8/10
GameSpot	6/10
IGN	7/10
VideoGamer.com	6/10

The Golf Club received "mixed or average" reviews, according to review aggregator Metacritic.
