= Rugby Challenge 2006 =

2006 video game

- Developer(s): Swordfish Studios
- Publisher(s): Hip Interactive; Ubisoft
- Platform(s): PlayStation 2, Windows, Xbox
- Release: PAL: 3 February 2006
- Genre(s): Sports
- Mode(s): Single-player, multiplayer

Rugby Challenge 2006 is a 2006 rugby union video game. There are a number of tournaments that can be played in the game, both club and international competition. In addition there is a career mode (which includes trade/recruitment/management etc.), full training mode, as well as player/team/tournament editor.

There are a number of 'Challenge Modes' as well; Survival mode, Classic mode and Superstar mode. Classic games/teams can also be unlocked. The in-game commentators are John Inverdale and Dewi Morris. The game has multiplayer up to 4 people.

== Covers ==
There are a number of different cover arts for the game; one features four different rugby union players (one from England, Wales, Ireland and Scotland), one features a number of Italian players, another has a Biarritz player (Dimitri Yachvili), and another has no rugby player, but a rugby ball on the cover.

== See also ==
- Rugby 06
- World Championship Rugby
