= Rugby 15 =

2014 video game

- Developer: HB Studios
- Publishers: PAL: Bigben Interactive; NA: Maximum Games
- Platforms: PlayStation 3; PlayStation 4; PlayStation Vita; Windows; Xbox 360; Xbox One
- Release: AU: December 4, 2014; EU: January 23, 2015; NA: February 24, 2015
- Genres: Sports, simulation
- Modes: Single-player, multiplayer

Rugby 15 is a rugby union simulation video game developed by HB Studios and published by Bigben Interactive. The North American version was published by Maximum Games. It was released on PlayStation 3, PlayStation 4, PlayStation Vita, Windows, Xbox 360 and Xbox One.

== Gameplay ==
It is possible to play an individual match with up to four local controllers, play in any of the licensed competitions or a custom created competition. The game does not feature a player and team customization mode or a career mode. No online mode existed in the game as the developers wanted to focus on the basics of the game to improve for future editions.

The weather would play a large part in gameplay with the wind affecting the projection of the ball and rain causing the pitch to deform and players to get muddy.

== Development and release ==
HB Studios had not developed a rugby union game since Rugby World Cup 2011, which was published by 505 Games. HB Studios announced that they wanted to start releasing an annual rugby game.

It was announced that the game would be available on PlayStation 3, PlayStation 4, PlayStation Vita, Windows, Xbox 360 and Xbox One. Rugby 15 launched on December 4, 2014 for Australasia, January 23, 2015 for Europe and February 24, 2015 for North America.

== Licenses ==
Rugby 15 featured the Northern Hemisphere Rugby Union licenses and it featured licences for all clubs in the Top 14, Pro D2, Premiership and Pro12.

== Reception ==
Reception

Aggregate score
Aggregator	Score
Metacritic	(PS4) 19/100 (XONE) 20/100

Review scores
Publication	Score
GamesRadar+	1/5
IGN	2/10

Rugby 15 received "generally unfavorable" reviews, according to review aggregator Metacritic.

GamesRadar+ was critical of the game, rating it 1/5, and wrote: "Rugby 15 isn’t just a disappointment; it’s significantly worse than its forebears. The simple stuff is over-complicated, and the basic tenets of Rugby Union are wrong. A nightmare vision of sporting hell." IGN was also critical of the game and rated it 2/10, writing: "it rarely felt as though skill or tactics played into scoring tries."
