= The Golf Club 2019 featuring PGA Tour =

- Developer: HB Studios
- Publisher: 2K
- Series: PGA Tour 2K
- Platforms: Windows; PlayStation 4 Xbox One
- Release: August 28, 2018
- Genre: Sports
- Modes: Single-player, multiplayer

The Golf Club 2019 featuring PGA Tour is a sports video game developed by HB Studios and published by 2K for Microsoft Windows, PlayStation 4 and Xbox One.

It is the third installment of the PGA Tour 2K series, the first in the overall series to be licensed by the PGA Tour and the final game in the series to be released under The Golf Club name. The online servers for the game were shut down on October 30, 2025.

== Reception ==
Reception

Aggregate score
Aggregator	Score
Metacritic	(PC) 72/100 (PS4) 75/100 (XONE) 80/100

Review scores
Publication	Score
Destructoid	5/10
Game Informer	8/10
GameSpot	8/10

The Golf Club 2019 featuring PGA Tour received "generally favorable reviews" for PlayStation 4 and Xbox One, while the Microsoft Windows version received "mixed or average reviews", according to review aggregator Metacritic.
