= Rugby World Cup 2011 (video game) =

2011 video game

- PlayStation 3 cover version featuring the Webb Ellis Cup
- Developer: HB Studios
- Publisher: 505 Games
- Platforms: PlayStation 3, Xbox 360
- Release: AU: August 25, 2011; EU: August 26, 2011; NA: September 1, 2011 (X360); NA: September 6, 2011 (PS3)
- Genres: Sports, simulation
- Modes: Single player, Multiplayer

Rugby World Cup 2011 is a rugby union video game developed by HB Studios and 505 Games.

The game is the official video game of the 2011 Rugby World Cup, and was released on both the PlayStation 3 and Xbox 360 for the PAL region in August 2011. It was released in North America in September 2011, with the PlayStation 3 version available via the PlayStation Store and the Xbox 360 version via Xbox Live Arcade.

== Details ==
No rugby union game had been produced for four years since Rugby 08, which was also developed by HB Studios, then under the EA Sports label. It was announced on 29 March 2010 that The Rugby Forum and its members, would help HB studios gain a better understanding of what the general rugby-supporting public wanted in the new title.

For the first time in the series of rugby games developed by HB Studios, the title has a player editor, but it is limited to attributes and names only.

== Modes ==
=== Tournament Mode ===
This mode, which is the only area of the game in which most of the official stadia appear, is based entirely on the real-life tournament. As such it can be competed in as any of the 20 participating teams, with a schedule of pool matches to match the actual tournament (although users can also choose to have the pools re-drawn randomly, as game developers try to extend the game's longevity by providing reason for players to complete the tournament more than once). This is the only mode on the game which allows for full-length matches to be played in the official tournament jerseys.

=== International Test ===
This mode allows for contests between any of the 20 included teams, at any stadium included in the game (except those stadia exclusive to the 'Tournament Mode'). Similar to one-off matches in the FIFA series, for example, the match situation is a 'one-off friendly' and can be taken to a combination of extra-time and/or a place-kick shootout if the scores are tied after the last play of the match.

=== Warm-up Tour ===
This mode allows users to take a team on a tour of teams in their opposite hemispheres, although to play the stronger sides the user must first complete two tours of weaker nations. For example, to tour to the Tri-Nations teams with a northern hemisphere team, the user must first complete a 'Pacific Islands Tour', encountering Tonga, Samoa and Fiji; and also a 'South Atlantic Tour', encountering Namibia and Argentina. To tour to the Six Nations countries with a southern hemisphere team, the user must again complete two tours: 'North American Tour', meeting United States and Canada; and then 'Eastern Tour', meeting Romania, Russia, Georgia and Japan.

=== Place Kick Shootout ===
This mode allows for the user to contest a place-kick competition between any two included teams of their choosing. The match takes place in 'Auckland' stadium (Eden Park), and is set at night.

== Teams ==
The game features all 20 international teams competing in the 2011 Rugby World Cup. However, only 10 of the teams are officially licensed. Teams such as the All Blacks (New Zealand), and the Wallabies (Australia) are unlicensed due to their exclusive licensing deal with rival video game Rugby Challenge.

== Trailer ==
The trailer of the game was released in July 2011.

== Demo ==
A demo was released on 2 August on Xbox Live and 3 August on the PlayStation Network. The playable teams are South Africa and England, and the venue is Auckland.

== Reception ==
Reception

Aggregate score
Aggregator	Score	
Aggregator	PS3	Xbox 360
Metacritic	50/100	55/100

Review scores
Publication	Score	
Publication	PS3	Xbox 360
Eurogamer	N/A	6/10
GamesMaster	52%	N/A
GameSpot	4.5/10	4.5/10
IGN	5/10	5/10
PlayStation Official Magazine – UK	6/10	N/A
Official Xbox Magazine (UK)	N/A	5/10
Play	49%	N/A
PSM3	47%	N/A
The Daily Telegraph	N/A	3/5
The Guardian	N/A	3/5

The game received "mixed" reviews on both platforms according to the review aggregation website Metacritic.

The Daily Telegraph gave the Xbox 360 version a score of three stars out of five and said that its most disappointing aspect "is just how threadbare it is in terms of modes." The Guardian similarly gave it three stars out of five and said that "there's just too little on offer here to justify the cost for a full-priced, boxed retail release." The Digital Fix gave it a score of four out of ten and said that it "stinks of under investment and cheap development shortcuts. It feels like a budget arcade game shoved into a shiny full-priced release and an officially licensed sticker stuck on top."
