= PGA Tour 2K23 =

- Cover art featuring Tiger Woods
- Developer: HB Studios (Note: Additional work by 2K Vegas)
- Publisher: 2K
- Series: PGA Tour 2K
- Engine: Unity
- Platforms: Microsoft Windows; PlayStation 4 PlayStation 5 Xbox One; Xbox Series X/S
- Release: October 14, 2022
- Genre: Sports
- Modes: Single-player, multiplayer

PGA Tour 2K23 is a sports video game developed by HB Studios and published by 2K for Microsoft Windows, PlayStation 4, PlayStation 5, Xbox One and Xbox Series X/S. It is the fifth installment of the PGA Tour 2K series and first game in the series to feature the Top of the Rock golf course as bonus content. PGA Tour 2K23 was the last PGA Tour 2K game to be released on the PlayStation 4 and Xbox One. The online servers will be shut down on March 12, 2027.

== Reception ==
Reception

Aggregate score
Aggregator	Score
Metacritic	(PC) 78/100 (PS5) 76/100 (XSXS) 78/100

Review scores
Publication	Score
GameSpot	8/10
GamesRadar+	4/5
Hardcore Gamer	4/5
IGN	6/10

PGA Tour 2K23 received "generally favorable" reviews, according to review aggregator Metacritic.
