= Jeff van Dyck =

- Genres: Video game music, rock
- Occupation: Composer
- Years active: 1992–present
- Website: jeffvandyck.com

Jeff van Dyck, known as simply Jeff Dyck in his early years, is a Canadian-Australian video game composer. Born and raised in Vancouver, van Dyck started to become known in the video game music industry in 1992, when he was working with Electronic Arts (EA) for several sports game franchises, such as the Need for Speed series, together with Saki Kaskas. After his stint with EA, van Dyck moved to Australia and became the composer for the Total War franchise by Creative Assembly. During his collaboration with the video game developer, van Dyck won a British Academy of Film and Television Arts Award (2001) and garnered a nomination (2005). As composer and audio director Total War: Shogun 2: Fall of the Samurai, he was nominated for the "Audio Achievement" section of the Develop awards in May 2012. In 2014 again as audio director, his team won a BAFTA for Alien: Isolation. Van Dyck is a partner in the Brisbane based indie developers Witch Beam (Assault Android Cactus, Unpacking) and EarthWork Games (Forts).

== Works ==
- Unpacking
- Paint the Town Red
- Submerged: Hidden Depths
- Forts
- Skyward Journey
- Hand of Fate 2
- Submerged
- Hand of Fate
- Alien: Isolation
- Vega Conflict
- Assault Android Cactus
- Total War: Shogun 2: Fall of the Samurai
- Total War: Shogun 2
- Rome: Total War and its expansions, Barbarian Invasion, Alexander
- Medieval: Total War and its expansion, Viking Invasion
- Medieval 2: Total War and its expansion, Kingdoms
- Shogun: Total War and its expansion, Mongol Invasion
- Spartan: Total Warrior
- Emperor: Rise of the Middle Kingdom
- Tiger Woods PGA Tour 2004
- The Need for Speed and Need for Speed II
- FIFA Soccer
- NHL Hockey
- AFL 99
- Sled Storm
- Skitchin'
- Stormrise

== Awards ==
- BAFTA Interactive Entertainment Award Winner in the category 'Interactive | Music in 2001' for Shogun Total War: Warlord Edition
- BAFTA 2005 Nomination for Video Game Original Soundtrack, Rome: Total War
