= Rugby 08 =

2007 video game

- PlayStation 2 cover featuring All Blacks player Richie McCaw.
- Developer: HB Studios
- Publisher: Electronic Arts
- Platforms: PlayStation 2, Microsoft Windows
- Release: NA: July 17, 2007 (PS2); AU: July 26, 2007; EU: July 27, 2007; JP: September 6, 2007 (PS2)
- Genre: Sports
- Modes: Single-player, multiplayer

Rugby 08 is the last release in the Rugby series to be published by EA Sports. The game allows players to play as 20 different Rugby nations, both major and minor, and includes many tournaments, such as the Rugby World Cup, Tri Nations, Six Nations, Guinness Premiership and Super 14.

Rugby 08 was released prior to the 2007 World Cup in France. New modes include the Rugby World Cup and the World Cup Challenge mode. Other new gameplay features include simplified lineouts and defensive formations.

In-game screenshot of Rugby 08 on PC

The commentary is provided by Ian Robertson and former All Blacks great Grant Fox.

== Gameplay ==
Rugby 08 is a rugby union simulation in which the player directly controls members of a team during matches. Movement is controlled with the analogue stick, while separate buttons are used for passing in either direction, sprinting and kicking. Tackling is largely automatic when a defending player is moved into the path of an opponent. The game includes a tutorial intended to introduce new players to its controls and the basic rules of rugby.

The game includes the 2007 Rugby World Cup, featuring all 20 participating national teams and the French stadiums used during the tournament. Other competitions include the Six Nations Championship, Tri Nations, Super 14, Guinness Premiership and European Trophy. The World League mode from Rugby 06 also returns, requiring the player to take control of a lower-division club and progress through the divisions while managing player transfers and recruitment.

A new World Cup Challenge mode contains 30 scenarios based on notable matches and events from previous Rugby World Cups. Players are given objectives which allow them either to reproduce or alter historical results, with successful completion unlocking Rugby World Cup highlight videos.

== Development and release ==
Rugby 08 was released for PlayStation 2 and Microsoft Windows. It was the final rugby union game published under the EA Sports label before the series went on hiatus.

== Cover versions ==
The international cover features Richie McCaw. Other players are featured in specific markets:

- Australia and Asia — Wallabies captain Stirling Mortlock
- France — McCaw and France flanker Yannick Nyanga
- Ireland — Former Ireland fly-half Ronan O'Gara
- Italy — Former Azzurri Mauro Bergamasco and Mirco Bergamasco
- South Africa — Former Springboks Schalk Burger, Bryan Habana, and André Pretorius
- United Kingdom — McCaw and England wing Mark Cueto
- New Zealand — Richie McCaw

== Reception ==
Rugby 08 received "mixed or average" reviews according to review aggregator Metacritic, with the PlayStation 2 version receiving a score of 74 out of 100 and the Windows version receiving 63 out of 100.

Reception

Aggregate score
Aggregator	Score	
Aggregator	PC	PS2
Metacritic	63/100	74/100

Review scores
Publication	Score	
Publication	PC	PS2
1Up.com	N/A	B+
Eurogamer	N/A	8/10
Famitsu	N/A	21/40
GamesMaster	N/A	73%
GameZone	N/A	8.5/10
IGN	N/A	(AU) 8.7/10 (US) 8.2/10
PlayStation Official Magazine – UK	N/A	(OPS2) 7/10; 5/10
PALGN	N/A	7.5/10
PC Gamer (UK)	45%	N/A
PlayStation: The Official Magazine	N/A	7/10

GameSpot awarded the game 7 out of 10, praising its accessible controls, extensive selection of game modes and number of licensed teams and players. The reviewer considered the game easy for newcomers to learn while retaining greater difficulty for experienced players. Criticism was directed at the absence of online multiplayer and the relatively small number of changes from Rugby 06, as well as repetitive commentary.

Todd Zuniga of 1Up.com gave the game a B+, praising the simplicity and intuitiveness of its controls, its fast pace and range of modes. He nevertheless criticised aspects of the scrum system, tackling, kicking camera angles and the game's limited explanation of rugby terminology to inexperienced players.

The Observer awarded the game three stars out of five. The review praised the improved controls, set plays and detailed graphics, but found player interaction with the ball could feel imprecise and considered the game technically behind contemporary football simulations. It nevertheless concluded that Rugby 08 demonstrated the potential for rugby games to compete more closely with other sports simulations.

== Legacy ==
Rugby 08 has subsequently been regarded by rugby publications as one of the benchmarks of the rugby video game genre. In 2018, Guinness World Records compared rugby video games that had received at least 20 professional reviews. Rugby 08 held a GameRankings average of 74.87%, making it the second-highest-rated qualifying rugby game behind EA Sports' Rugby at 75.56%, and slightly ahead of Rugby 2005 at 74.5%.

In a 2021 article examining the absence of a major modern rugby simulation, Rugby World stated that Rugby 08 remained widely considered superior to the rugby union and rugby league games released during the 2010s.

In its 2023 history of rugby union video games, RugbyPass described Rugby 08 as a game still argued by many to be the best rugby title available, praising its graphics for the period, licensing and smooth gameplay. The publication also noted continued calls for the game to be remastered or re-released on modern consoles.

A 2024 RugbyPass retrospective described Rugby 08 and Jonah Lomu Rugby as classics of the genre and stated that, in the 17 years following the game's release, no subsequent rugby game had matched the former's level of finesse. Georgian international Lasha Jaiani recalled that playing Rugby 08 as a child helped increase his interest in rugby, and that friends who did not otherwise follow or play the sport also played the game.
