= Rugby (video game) =

2000 video game

- PlayStation 2 cover featuring English international Martin Johnson
- Developer: Creative Assembly
- Publisher: EA Sports
- Composer: Jeff van Dyck
- Platforms: Microsoft Windows, PlayStation 2
- Release: Microsoft Windows: EU: 1 September 2000; PlayStation 2: EU: 15 June 2001; NA: 16 July 2001
- Genre: Sports
- Modes: Single-player, multiplayer

Rugby (known as EA Sports Rugby, and as Rugby 2001 in the European PC version; often mislabeled as Rugby 2002) is the 2000 installment of Electronic Arts' Rugby video game series. The game was developed by Creative Assembly and published by EA Sports. The game is EA Sports' first rugby union game on Microsoft Windows and PlayStation 2, and was succeeded by Rugby 2004. Rugby features over 20 teams, over 500 players and over 20 stadiums. The game's commentators are Bill McLaren and former England International Jamie Salmon.

The game featured the national teams who took part in the 1999 Rugby World Cup.

== Reception ==
Reception

Aggregate scores
Aggregator	Score	
Aggregator	PC	PS2
GameRankings	68%	76%
Metacritic	N/A	73/100

Review scores
Publication	Score	
Publication	PC	PS2
Electronic Gaming Monthly	N/A	7/10
Game Informer	N/A	7.5/10
GamePro	N/A	4/5
GamesMaster	N/A	68%
GameSpot	N/A	6.8/10
IGN	N/A	7.3/10
PlayStation Official Magazine – UK	N/A	8/10
Official U.S. PlayStation Magazine	N/A	3.5/5
PC Zone	68%	N/A
PlayStation: The Official Magazine	N/A	7/10
BBC Sport	N/A	94%
FHM	N/A	4/5

The PS2 version received "average" reviews according to the review aggregation website Metacritic.
