= HB Studios =

Canadian video game developer

HB Studios Multimedia Limited
- Type: Subsidiary
- Industry: Video games
- Founded: July 2000; 26 years ago
- Headquarters: Lunenburg, Nova Scotia, Canada
- Key people: James Seaboyer (Studio Head); Dave McFarland (Technical Director)
- Parent: 2K (2021–present)
- Website: hb-studios.com

HB Studios Multimedia Limited is a Canadian video game developer based in Lunenburg, Nova Scotia. It is best known for its rugby, cricket, and golf games.

== History ==
HB Studios was founded in early July 2000 by Jeremy Wellard in Lunenburg, Nova Scotia. The company started with nine employees and developed Cricket 2002 for Electronic Arts. The studio entered a multi-project deal with EA Canada in 2004 to continue developing sports games for the EA Sports label, including further games in the Rugby and Cricket series, FIFA Street 2 for the PlayStation Portable as well as co-development on Madden 07 for the Wii. This exclusivity deal ended in 2007.

In 2008, HB Studios opened a second studio in Halifax, Nova Scotia. At the time, the company had 130 employees. The Halifax studio was closed at the end of July 2012 with all development moved to the headquarters in Lunenberg. The last games developed by the satellite studio were NBA Baller Beats for Xbox 360 and Medal Bound for iOS. A publishing label, HB Arcade, was formed in 2009 with the goal of self-publishing downloadable titles on WiiWare, PlayStation Network, and Xbox Live Arcade. Games released under this label included HB Arcade Cards and HB Arcade Disc Golf, both for WiiWare, as well as Jam Space for DSiWare.

Wellard stepped down as president of the company in February 2015 and was to be replaced by Alan Bunker, the chief operating officer. In August 2018, 2K Sports took over the publishing of The Golf Club 2019 featuring PGA Tour which was released on August 28, 2018. Bunker departed the company in November 2019, with James Seaboyer taking over as chief executive officer. Dave McFarland, previously the technical director, became the chief technology officer, while Craig Heffler remained the chief financial officer.

HB Studios was acquired by 2K in March 2021 and will continue to work on PGA Tour games. 2K also secured a long-term contract with Tiger Woods to use his likeness for these games as well as to serve as executive producer and consultant for the series.

== Games developed ==
List of games developed by HB Studios
Year	Title	Publisher	Platform
2001	Cricket 2002	EA Sports	Microsoft Windows, PlayStation 2
2003	Cricket 2004	EA Sports	Microsoft Windows, PlayStation 2
2003	Rugby 2004	EA Sports	Microsoft Windows, PlayStation 2
2005	Rugby 2005	EA Sports	Microsoft Windows, PlayStation 2, Xbox
2005	Cricket 2005	EA Sports	Microsoft Windows, PlayStation 2, Xbox
2006	Rugby 06	EA Sports	Microsoft Windows, PlayStation 2
2006	FIFA Street 2	EA Sports	PlayStation Portable
2006	Madden NFL 07	EA Sports	Wii
2006	Cricket 07	EA Sports	Microsoft Windows, PlayStation 2
2007	UEFA Champions League 2006–2007	EA Sports	Microsoft Windows, PlayStation 2, PlayStation Portable
2007	Rugby 08	EA Sports	Microsoft Windows, PlayStation 2
2007	NHL 08	EA Sports	Microsoft Windows, PlayStation 2
2007	NBA Live 08	EA Sports	Microsoft Windows, PlayStation 2, PlayStation Portable, Wii
2008	UEFA Euro 2008	EA Sports	Microsoft Windows, PlayStation 2, PlayStation Portable
2008	Big Beach Sports	THQ	Wii
2008	NHL 09	EA Sports	Microsoft Windows, PlayStation 2
2008	FIFA 09	EA Sports	Microsoft Windows, PlayStation 2, PlayStation Portable
2008	NBA Live 09	EA Sports	PlayStation 2, PlayStation Portable, Wii
2009	Rock Revolution	Konami	Nintendo DS, Wii
2009	Tiger Woods PGA Tour 10	EA Sports	PlayStation 2, PlayStation Portable
2009	Football Academy	EA Sports	Nintendo DS
2009	HB Arcade Cards	HB Arcade	Wii
2009	FIFA 10	EA Sports	Microsoft Windows, PlayStation 2, PlayStation Portable
2009	NBA Live 10	EA Sports	PlayStation Portable
2010	2010 FIFA World Cup South Africa	EA Sports	PlayStation Portable, Wii
2010	FIFA 11 Ultimate Team	EA Sports	PlayStation 3, Xbox 360
2010	Backyard Sports: Sandlot Sluggers	Atari	Microsoft Windows, Wii, Xbox 360
2010	FIFA 11	EA Sports	Android, iOS, PlayStation 2, PlayStation Portable
2010	HB Arcade Disc Golf	HB Arcade	Wii
2010	Backyard Sports: Rookie Rush	Atari	Microsoft Windows, Wii, Xbox 360
2010	HB Arcade Jam Space	HB Arcade	Nintendo DSi
2011	Rugby World Cup 2011	505 Games	PlayStation 3, Xbox 360
2011	Fight Night Champion	EA Sports	iOS
2011	Madden NFL 12	EA Sports	PlayStation 2, PlayStation Portable, Wii
2011	HB Rugby: Fixture Challenge	HB Studios	iOS
2012	Medal Bound	HB Studios	iOS
2012	NBA Baller Beats	Majesco	Xbox 360
2012	Madden NFL 13	EA Sports	PlayStation Vita, Wii
2012	Maze Adventures	HB Studios	iOS
2012	Ace Geographer: Canada	HB Studios	iOS
2013	MLB.com Home Run Derby	MLB.com	Android, iOS
2013	MLB.com Franchise MVP	MLB.com	Android, iOS
2014	MLB.com Home Run Derby 2014	MLB.com	Android, iOS
2014	The Golf Club	HB Studios	Microsoft Windows, PlayStation 4, Xbox One
2014	Rugby 15	HB Studios	Microsoft Windows, PlayStation 3, PlayStation 4, PlayStation Vita, Xbox 360, Xbox One
2015	Rugby World Cup 2015	HB Studios	Microsoft Windows, PlayStation 3, PlayStation 4, PlayStation Vita, Xbox 360, Xbox One
2015	R.B.I. Baseball 15	MLB	Android, iOS, macOS, Microsoft Windows, PlayStation 4, Xbox One
2016	Mark McMorris Infinite Air	Maximum Games	Microsoft Windows, PlayStation 4, Xbox One
2016	RBI Baseball 2016	MLB	Android, iOS, macOS, Microsoft Windows, PlayStation 4, Xbox One
2017	The Golf Club VR	HB Studios	Microsoft Windows
2017	The Golf Club 2	Maximum Games	Microsoft Windows, PlayStation 4, Xbox One
2018	The Golf Club 2019 featuring PGA Tour	2K Sports	Microsoft Windows, PlayStation 4, Xbox One
2020	PGA Tour 2K21	2K Sports	Microsoft Windows, Nintendo Switch, PlayStation 4, Stadia, Xbox One
2022	PGA Tour 2K23	2K Sports	Microsoft Windows, PlayStation 4, PlayStation 5, Xbox One, Xbox Series X/S
2025	PGA Tour 2K25	2K Sports	Microsoft Windows, Nintendo Switch 2, PlayStation 5, Xbox Series X/S
