= Rugby 06 =

2006 video game

- Developers: EA Canada, HB Studios
- Publisher: EA Sports
- Platforms: PlayStation 2, Microsoft Windows, Xbox
- Release: EU: February 10, 2006; NA: February 14, 2006 (PS2, Xbox); JP: September 21, 2006 (PS2)
- Genre: Sports
- Mode: Single-player

Rugby 06 is the 2006 release in the Rugby series by EA Sports. The game allows players to play as many Rugby nations, both major and minor, and includes many tournaments, such as the Rugby World Cup, the Tri Nations, the Six Nations, and the Super 14.

== Features ==
This game has several new features. Some of the features are for graphical purposes (e.g. new weather effects), and others are for gameplay (e.g. new tackle options and off-load passing options). Some of the features are:

=== Playable modes ===
6 Nations, Tri-Nations (with the Bledisloe Cup), Ten Nations, Lions Tour (SA, NZ, Australia), Super 14, Guinness Premiership, World League, World Championship, European Trophy, manager mode

=== Increased tactical plays ===
25+ new tactical plays can be chosen by the player.

=== Off-load passing ===
When the player's character draws a defender to him, he is able to quickly off-load the ball to a teammate before the defender actually tackles him. This can cause a gap in the defensive line, which can be exploited by the player.

=== Comprehensive commentary ===
Ian Robertson returns for this game, next to former All Black great Grant Fox, as well as comments from Murray Mexted.

=== Impact Players ===
Impact/Star player, are players that could potentially turn a match in the player's favour. These player are the best in-game in their specialised area. Impact players are highlighted in game with a star above their heads.

=== Enhanced players and stadium conditions ===
The game features new stadium animations, such as banner rotations, 3D grass, and team relevant flags. Also the weather conditions are improved, and new conditions are added. The player can now play in snow and fog, and even see the characters' breath in cold weather.

=== Quick penalties ===
The game also includes the option of taking a quick penalty, which can help to score a sneaky try or just to gain some metres.

== Reception ==
Reception

Aggregate score
Aggregator	Score		
Aggregator	PC	PS2	Xbox
Metacritic	70/100	77/100	76/100

Review scores
Publication	Score		
Publication	PC	PS2	Xbox
Eurogamer	N/A	N/A	8/10
Famitsu	N/A	25/40	N/A
GameSpot	N/A	7.6/10	7.6/10
GameZone	N/A	N/A	8.7/10
IGN	N/A	8.3/10	8.3/10
PlayStation Official Magazine – UK	N/A	7/10	N/A
Official Xbox Magazine (US)	N/A	N/A	7.5/10
PC Gamer (UK)	39%	N/A	N/A
TeamXbox	N/A	N/A	8.4/10
VideoGamer.com	8/10	8/10	8/10
The A.V. Club	N/A	B	B
The Times	4/5 stars	4/5 stars	4/5 stars

The PlayStation 2 and Xbox versions received "generally favorable reviews", while the PC version received "average" reviews, according to the review aggregation website Metacritic. In Japan, Famitsu gave the PS2 version a score of one seven, one five, one seven, and one six, for a total of 25 out of 40.

The Sydney Morning Herald gave the PS2 version a score of four stars out of five and stated, "Scoring a drop goal can be the trickiest move in the game, simply because the camera angle makes it difficult to line up. Whilst the game tends to be annoyingly accurate on higher settings, just persuade a friend to play to even up the challenge." The Times also gave the game a score of four stars out of five and said that "Rugby, with its elaborate set-pieces and impenetrable laws, is a hard game to render on computer, but this is an extremely good try." The A.V. Club gave the PS2 and Xbox versions a B, saying that the game "isn't as pretty as the bigger EA Sports games, but it isn't as larded down with excess crap, either; just lots of teams, lots of tournaments, and what we'll assume are famous players in a good tough sport."

== See also ==
- Rugby Challenge 2006
