= Rome: Total Realism =

Rome Total Realism
- Developers: Rome: Total Realism Team; RIS Team
- Publishers: Rome: Total Realism Team; RIS Team
- Designers: Rome: Total Realism Team; RIS Team
- Engine: Rome: Total War, Rome: Total War Barbarian Invasion, Total War: Rome Remastered
- Platforms: Windows, Mac
- Release: 2005-2012; 2021-
- Genre: Real-time tactics
- Mode: Single-player

Rome: Total Realism (or RTR) is a series of complete modification packs for the computer game Rome: Total War, intended to rectify historical inaccuracies in the original game. RTR has been featured in several major gaming sites and magazines, such as PC Gamer (US), PC Gamer UK, and GameSpot. Recent versions of RTR include Rome: Total Realism VII : Grand Campaign, which uses the newer Barbarian Invasion (expansion to Rome: Total War) engine. In 2021, the RTR team joined forces with the old Roma Surrectum team in order to develop a new project called RTR: Imperium Surrectum for the remaster of the original game that has recently been brought on the market by Feral Interactive.

== Description ==
Although the original game Rome: Total War was extremely successful and has been used to animate several historical TV programs (including the tactical simulation Time Commanders), numerous gamers expressed disappointment with the historical inaccuracy of the game. These inaccuracies were acknowledged by the game's creators, Creative Assembly, who admitted the inclusion of numerous anachronisms and inaccuracies in order to improve gameplay experience. The mod developers thus sought to include new playable factions; improvements to units and battle experience on the tactical map; more realistic recruitment limits and improvements to the main campaign map.

The first versions of RTR were originally created by the Total War Center user GaiusJulius. The final product of this original RTR team was called the RTR6 Gold Edition. Afterwards, the RTR community continued to develop this modification into what eventually became the RTR Platinum Edition.

From 2008, the old RTR Team was joined by many new members, who together have released several more mods in a series called RTR VII. The first, Rome Total Realism VII: The Iberian Conflict (TiC), focuses on the struggles of Hamilcar Barca to conquer the Iberian Peninsula, setting Carthage against Celtiberia. The second release, Rome Total Realism VII: Fate of Empires (FoE), expands upon TiC to include the rest of the Western Mediterranean, including Italy, North Africa, Sicily and Southern Gaul. It starts in 280 BC, when Pyrrhus of Epirus invades Italy to try to bring about the end of Rome. What happens after that is for the player to decide. The final expansion, Rome: Total Realism VII: Grand Campaign (simply styled RTR VII) expands on FoE to include the rest of Gaul, Greece, the Balkan areas, and part of Asia Minor. It aims to max out the capabilities of the RTW Engine. The last RTR VII series patch (RTR VII Gold) was released in 2012.

A remaster of the original game Rome: Total War was released on 29 April 2021, developed by Feral Interactive. Soon after the remaster was announced, the RTR team has joined forces with the team behind another popular modification series for the original game, Roma Surrectum. Together, they have recently released the first version of a new modification for the remastered version of the mod, titled RTR: Imperium Surrectum (or RIS). Through a fruitful cooperation with Feral's developers, it has proven possible to move beyond hard-coded limitations of the original game engine. Development is expected to continue over the next years on this new platform.

== See also ==
- Europa Barbarorum
