= Total War: Shogun 2 =

2011 video game

- Developer: Creative Assembly
- Publisher: Sega
- Director: Mike Simpson
- Producer: Ross Manton
- Designers: James Russell; Jamie Ferguson
- Programmers: Richard Broadhurst; Charlie Dell
- Artists: Kevin McDowell; Joss Adley
- Writers: Mike Brunton; Dion Lay; Kate Watson
- Composer: Jeff van Dyck
- Series: Total War
- Platforms: Microsoft Windows; macOS; Linux
- Release: Windows; 15 March 2011; macOS; 31 July 2014; Linux; 23 May 2017; Complete Edition; Windows; 13 October 2026
- Genres: Turn-based strategy, Real-time tactics
- Modes: Single-player, multiplayer

Total War: Shogun 2 is a strategy video game developed by Creative Assembly and published by Sega in 2011. It is the seventh mainline entry in the Total War series and returns to the setting of the first Total War game, Shogun: Total War, after a series of games set mainly in Europe and the Middle East.

As with the original game, Shogun 2 is set in 16th-century feudal Japan, during a period known as the Sengoku Jidai (Warring States period), where the ruling Ashikaga shogunate has lost its authority over the regional warlords (daimyō) and their clans, who now fight amongst themselves for power. The player takes on the management of one of these clans, with the goal of defeating rival clans and ultimately establishing their rule over Japan as the new Shogun. The standard edition of the game features a total of eight factions (plus a ninth faction for the tutorial), each with a unique starting position and different political and military strengths. The limited edition includes an exclusive ninja clan, the Hattori, and a DLC unlocks a tenth clan, the Ikko-Ikki.

The game moves away from the European setting of previous Total War games and returns to the first setting in the Total War series, but making significant changes to core gameplay elements of Shogun 2. Compared to Empire which spanned almost the entire globe, the new installment focuses only on the islands of Japan (excluding Hokkaido) and on a reduced number of unit types.

Shogun 2 received critical praise from reviewers, including for its simplification and refinement of the series by returning to its roots. A standalone expansion, Total War: Shogun 2: Fall of the Samurai, which depicts the 19th-century Boshin War, was released in 2012. A remaster of the game featuring the base game with all of its downloadable content and variety of additions and improvements, subtitled Complete Edition, was released on 13 October 2026. The Complete Edition was temporarily pulled from sale a couple days later following severe player backlash with Sega promising to investigate the issues and reinstating the original game for sale.

== Gameplay ==
The campaign mode features a map of Japan with different provinces, agents, and armies indicated by figures.

Shogun 2's blend of turn-based strategy and real-time tactics gameplay is a staple of the Total War series. The player plays the role of both the clan leader and general, alternating between the campaign, where the player manages land and armies turn by turn, and the battles, where the player takes control of the army on the battlefield in real-time.

In the campaign, the player needs to oversee the development of settlements, military production, economic growth, and technological advancement respectively. The armies and units are organised and moved around the stylised campaign map by the player to carry out battles with other factions. In addition to fighting, the player is able to engage in diplomacy, political manoeuvring and the use of special agents to gain the upper hand. Ninja and geisha are also present in the game as assassins and spies.

The game's unit roster includes both peasant soldiers known as ashigaru as well as samurai warriors: ashigaru are basic infantry which are easily recruitable and cheaper to field than samurai, while samurai require specific province buildings to recruit but are more effective in combat and assume specialised roles in battle, such as cavalry. Other land units the player may field include siege units such as mangonels and European-made cannons, and a few special units such as the kisho ninja, who excel at stealth and climbing castle walls. Naval battles first introduced in Empire and Napoleon return in Shogun 2, and the player can construct warships of various weights and speed which can fire upon enemy ships or engage in boarding actions.

There are four types of agents the player may recruit. Ninja are capable of scouting, sabotage, and assassination, geisha specialises in solely assassination, metsuke can oversee provinces, arrest or execute enemy agents, or even bribe enemy settlements and armies, and monks (or missionaries for Christian clans) can inspire armies, spread the clan's religion, and convince enemy agents to retire.

Bolstering a clan's capabilities is the research tree known as "Mastery of the Arts", which is divided into Bushido (military) and Way of Chi (economic, religious, and agents) reforms that provide the player with new units, buildings, and abilities. Certain buildings, events, and character modifiers can improve a clan's research speed.

The player must also manage religious affairs in their domain. The predominant religion among clans, Shinto-Buddhism, allows the player to recruit warrior monks—infantry units that forego armour in exchange for exceptional combat capabilities. Meanwhile, the Catholic faith introduced by European traders instead provides the player with enhanced trade and early access to firearms, and converting the clan to Christianity will grant further advantages. However, provinces with religions other than the player's clan causes significant civil unrest, and must be countered by religious buildings or agents. Conversely, the player can spread their religion to enemy clans to incite unrest.

There are nine major clans that inhabit the provinces of Japan which the player chooses from. There are others, including the "Amakasu retainer clan". All Clans have particular advantages in certain areas, to give a variety of play style with each.

- The Chōsokabe clan inhabit Tosa Province and can recruit superior archers and generate more income from farming.
- The Date clan control Iwate and can recruit superior no-dachi samurai, and their units also get a bonus when charging.
- The Hōjō clan are great castle builders and siege specialists. They inhabit Izu Province and Sagami Province.
- The Mōri clan inhabit Aki province and have a long history of naval mastery.
- The Oda clan field superior ashigaru and are settled in Owari Province.
- The Shimazu clan inhabit Satsuma Province and can recruit superior katana-armed samurai, their generals are also more loyal to their clan.
- The Takeda clan preside over Kai Province and recruit superior cavalry.
- The Tokugawa clan inhabit Mikawa Province initially as a vassal of the Imagawa clan and rely on diplomatic relations and the recruitment of better warrior ninja and metsuke.
- The Uesugi clan control Echigo Province and specialize in Buddhism, allowing them to recruit better monks and warrior monks as well as generating more income from trading.

There are also three factions available as downloadable content (the Hattori faction came complimentary with preorders of the game, however):

- The Hattori are the leading family in Iga Province and recruit specialised ninja and warrior ninja with more expertise.
- The Ikkō-ikki clan are a "family" of religious rebels that control Echizen Province and Kaga Province, and recruit rōnin and superior warrior monks.
- The Ōtomo clan control Bungo Province and Buzen Province, they start under the Catholic faith and can recruit superior firearm units, as well as Portuguese Elite Infantry known as terços.

Shogun 2 added the ability to unlock traits and special abilities for generals and agents as they gain experience. A ninja skill tree is seen in this screenshot.

In Total War: Shogun 2, leaders and generals are given personality and depth in gameplay, with high emphasis on role-playing. Generals and agents are portrayed as "larger-than-life" heroes with unique characteristics and powerful abilities. The player is able to improve and unlock traits and special abilities for the characters as they gain experience. However, the player may also be inclined to engage in family politics within the clan to keep its members loyal.

A group of Date yari ashigaru fighting a group of Shimazu samurai in the game's real time battle mode

The battles of Shogun 2 involve large-scale engagements between armies that meet on the campaign map and can take place on land or on water. The developers proclaim they are paying particular attention to re-designing the naval and siege battles appropriate to the new setting. In contrast to European castles and forts, the castles in feudal Japan had multiple tiers, and thus the siege battles in the game put less focus on wall defences but more on courtyard brawls and tactical maneuvering. Also, the players will fight naval battles with unique Japanese ships resembling "floating castles", and take into consideration melees on ships, arrow fire, coastal terrain, and other factors.

As in Empire: Total War and Napoleon: Total War, the weather and climatic conditions have an effect on battles. For example, fog greatly reduces visibility, while heavy rain diminishes the effectiveness of missile troops, such as archers or gunners, thus requiring the players to adapt their strategies. Also, as in Napoleon, armies standing on enemy provinces during winter season or fleets far from the coast suffer attrition.

Unique to Shogun 2 is a feature known as Realm Divide, in which one by one, all computer-controlled surviving clans declare war on the player (or players in coop-campaign mode) and ally with each other, though the player's allies tend to do so later. Realm Divide is triggered either when the player captures the Shogunate capital of Kyoto and holds it for four turns—thereby becoming the new Shogun—or alternatively, if the player raises their clan's fame to the maximum level through conquering Provinces and winning battles.

Shogun 2 features multiplayer battles with up to 8 players as well as multiplayer campaigns involving competitive or cooperative play with 2 players. In a multiplayer campaign, players can be grouped into different clans, so that for each clan, one player assumes the role of clan leader and others take command of armies. The clan leader has the ability to direct other players and assign rewards based on loyalty and performance, introducing clan politics into multiplayer. As a player's army invades an enemy territory or is attacked by enemy armies, the online matchmaker finds a suitable opponent and initiates a multiplayer battle. When a player defeats enemy armies and conquers territories, the player will gain points and other bonuses for the clan. In addition, an achievement system is designed to provide adhering players with unique abilities and cosmetic upgrades.

== Release ==
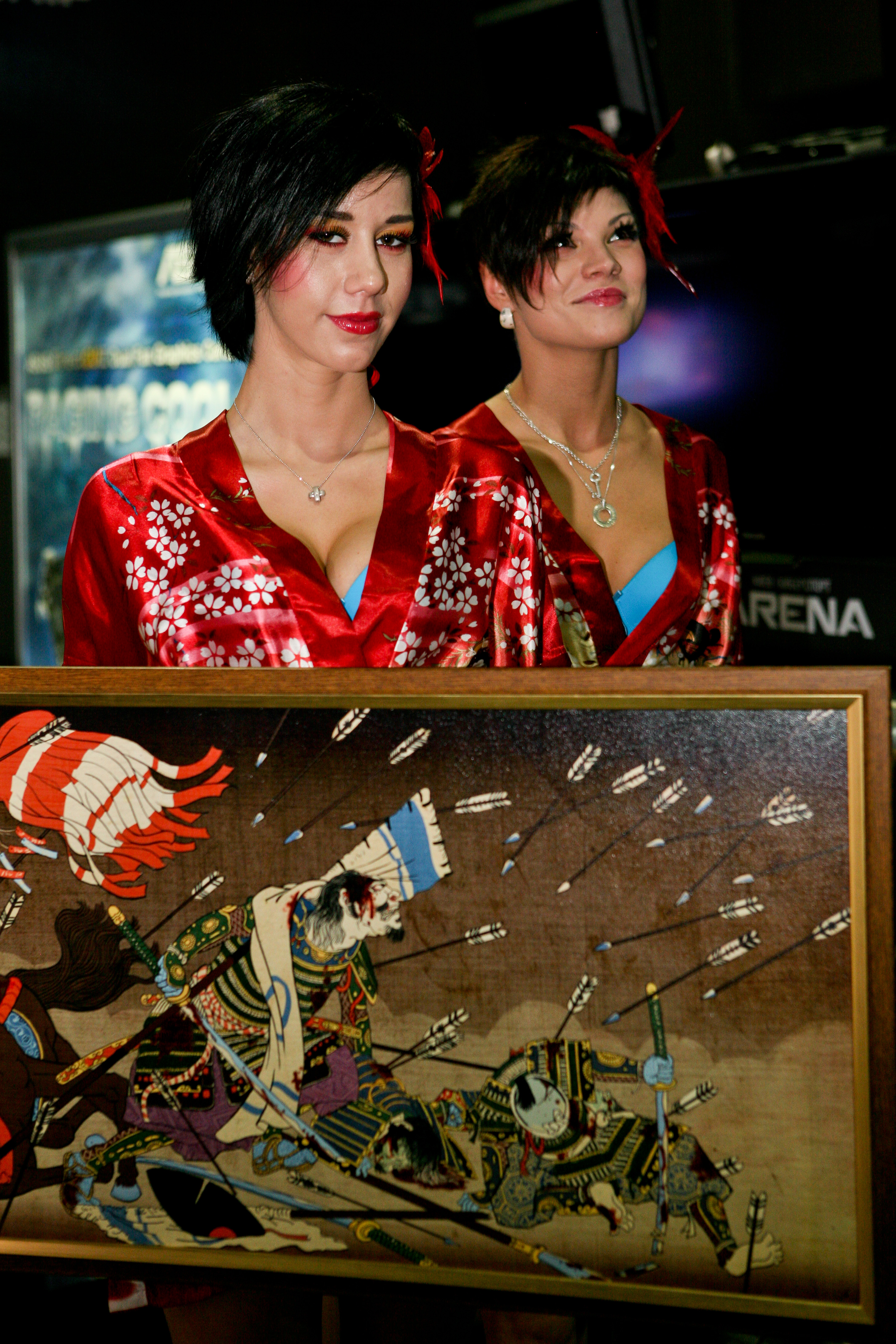
Total War: Shogun 2 launch event in Kyiv

A demo became available on Steam on 22 February 2011. The demo covers the campaign tutorial, the historical Battle of Sekigahara and the full game encyclopaedia.

Shogun 2 was released in four different editions. The "Standard Edition" contains just the game, while the "Limited Edition" additionally makes playable a unique faction with special talents (the Hattori Clan), an additional historical battle scenario 'Nagashino', a complete set of armour for the player's online avatar and a starting bank of experience points to spend on that online character. The "Collector's Edition" includes the "Limited Edition" content as well as a replica bamboo box containing a Shogun 2 art book and a detailed figurine of Takeda Shingen. The "Grand Master's Edition" consists of the "Collector's Edition", as well as a bamboo Shogun 2 themed chess set, currently exclusive to select stores in the UK and Australia.

Players who pre-ordered at GameStop (online or in-store) unlocked and can take part in the historic Battle of Kawagoe. Set in 1545, the Battle of Kawagoe saw the Later Hōjō clan launch a successful night time counter-attack against the besieging Uesugi clan, eschewing heavy armour in favour of speed and stealth. Those who pre-ordered at Best Buy (online or in-store only) will unlock 1,000 Koku, the currency used in Total War: Shogun 2. Player's campaigns will begin with 1,000 Koku, allowing them to purchase new buildings, train new units and upgrade their towns.

As a special pre-order bonus, Steam announced the "Shogun Pack" for Team Fortress 2. This was given to players who purchased Total War: Shogun 2 before its release date. The pack consists of eight feudal Japan-themed items, including a sashimono, katana, kunai and gunbai. These items do not affect Shogun 2 in any way and can only be used in Team Fortress 2. Steam also released the Total War Collection on 10 March 2012. This consisted of Empire: Total War, Medieval II: Total War, Rome: Total War, and Napoleon: Total War. It also included Total War: Shogun 2 which could be preloaded on 14 March.

=== Downloadable content ===
- "The Ikko-Ikki Clan Pack" (released on 26 May 2011) adds the "warrior monk" clan to Shogun 2 and a wide variety of brand-new content for use across the different game modes of Shogun 2. It is new clan for use in single or multiplayer Campaign modes and Custom and Multiplayer Battles. There are 8 new unit-variants specific to the Ikko-Ikki clan; new technology tree; new historical battle, Nagashima 1574 (Ikko-Ikki vs. Oda); Ikko-Ikki armour set for Avatar – includes hood, robes and barefoot leg-pieces; and new Retainers for use in the Avatar Conquest mode.
- "Sengoku Jidai Unit Pack" adds ten new elite units for multiplayer and singleplayer game modes. Along with this DLC pack came a patch which fixed several bugs and revamped unit balancing in multiplayer game modes.
- "Saints and Heroes Unit Pack" adds nine new hero units for multiplayer and single-player game modes. Along with this DLC pack came a patch which fixed several bugs and revamped unit balancing in multiplayer game modes.
- "Rise of the Samurai Campaign", set 400 years before the dramatic civil war depicted in Shogun 2, is based on the Genpei War, a conflict between six legendary clans of the Taira, Minamoto and Fujiwara families. It culminated in the first Shogunate, and the rise of the Samurai as the ruling class. Rise of the Samurai DLC pack adds new units in multiplayer and single player battles. The pack adds 16 new land units spread across swordsmen, spearmen, archers, and cavalry; 4 new Hero units; 10 new naval units and 3 new naval special abilities; and 4 new agent types with their own unique skill trees, and a new historical battle of Anegawa (1570). The campaign retains the realm divide event from Shogun 2.
- "The Hattori Clan Pack" includes all four unlocks previously only available in Total War: Shogun 2 Limited Edition. The Hattori clan are masters of the Iga-ryu ninjutsu – a unique collection of martial skills and guerrilla techniques. This additional in-game faction is available for use in single or multiplayer Campaign modes and Custom and Multiplayer Battles. It includes the most powerful battlefield ninja units. The Battle of Nagashino (historical scenario) saw an alliance between the Oda and Tokugawa clans clashing against the legendary Takeda clan in 1575.
- "Blood Pack" adds blood and gore visual effects as well as the appropriate sound effects.
- "The Otomo Clan Pack" adds a Christian clan with slightly changed research tree and more "Westernized" units.
- "Battle of Kawagoe" adds a historical battle previously available only in the pre-order offer of the Gamestop store.

=== Post‑release support ===
- Assembly Kit & Workshop support (September 2012): Creative Assembly published the Total War: Shogun 2 Assembly Kit, a suite of modding tools that enabled Steam Workshop integration and scripted single‑player battles. This greatly expanded community mod support. Alongside the Assembly Kit, Steam Workshop support went live, allowing players to discover, subscribe to, and share custom maps, scenarios, and full conversion mods directly through Steam.
- Final compiler & CPU patch with chat removal (May 2023): After more than a decade without content patches, CA rolled out a compiler upgrade to improve performance on modern hardware and fixed crashes on CPUs with over 32 logical cores.
- Steam Deck compatibility status: The game is currently listed as "Unsupported" on Steam Deck, with Valve still working on official support.

=== Compilations and ports ===
On 5 March 2013 in North America and on 8 March of the same year in Europe and Australasia (Eu/Au) "Gold Edition" compilations were released. The North American edition contained the base game, the Rise of the Samurai campaign and the Fall of the Samurai game. The Eu/Au edition contained these as well as all but one of the downloadable content packs (Dragon War Battle, Hattori Clan, Ikko Ikki Clan, Otomo Clan, Saga Clan, Obama Clan, Tsu Clan, Sendai Clan, Saints & Heroes Elite Unit and Sengoku Jidai Elite Unit packs but not the Blood Pack). The Eu/Au version also came in a gold and black wajima-nuri inspired folding case unlike the standard case for the North American version.

On 31 July 2014, Shogun 2 was released for macOS by Feral Interactive, along with the Total War: Shogun 2 Collection, which includes all previously released additional content. (Note: Except "Blood Pack", due to age ratings.) Shogun 2, Shogun 2 Collection and Fall of the Samurai were released for Linux on 23 May 2017.

=== Complete Edition ===
In September 2026, Creative Assembly announced a remaster of the game, Total War: Shogun 2 – Complete Edition, which will feature the base game and all of its DLC, in addition to various additions and improvements, including: improved visuals, lighting and shadows, full Japanese and Chinese voice acting and text localization, 1440p and 4K UI scaling, modernised controls, over 50 new playable factions, integrated in-game mod support using Mod.io, colourblind accessibility options, 64-bit upgrade and ultrawide monitor support. The remaster launched on 13 October 2026 for Microsoft Windows. On Steam, players will also receive the original version of the game and all of the DLC. Players who own the base game will receive a time-limited 75% loyalty discount for the remaster, and all of the DLC for the original game that they don't already own will be made available for free.

Upon release, the Complete Edition received "Overwhelmingly Negative" reviews from Steam users. The UI artist of the original lambasted the remaster as "very lazy" for allegedly using AI-upscaled artwork. In response, SEGA and Creative Assembly announced on 15 October 2026 that the Complete Edition was to be temporarily delisted for quality issues, with the original release taking its place.

== Reception ==
Reception

Aggregate score
Aggregator	Score
Metacritic	90/100

Review scores
Publication	Score
Eurogamer	9/10
Game Informer	95%
GameSpot	9/10
IGN	9/10
PC Gamer (UK)	92/100
X-Play	5/5
GameScope	10/10

Award
Publication	Award
GameSpot; IGN; GameTrailers; GameSpy	Best Strategy Game of 2011

Total War: Shogun 2 received "universal acclaim", according to review aggregator Metacritic.

Al Bickham of PC Gamer gave Shogun 2 a score of 92%. In his review, he praised the game's visual design, music and atmosphere, attention to detail, refined and simplified troop variety, the "pleasing geometric puzzle" of siege battles, and the marked improvement to the enemy's artificial intelligence on both the campaign map and during battles compared to previous Total War games—namely Empire—noting that they are properly challenging to the player on higher difficulty levels. Bickham also complimented the overhauled multiplayer and the addition of the clan system that encourages community oriented gameplay. He concludes by declaring the game to be a "tighter, more focused" experience compared to Empire and Napoleon and a return to form for the series. In 2019, PC Gamer listed Shogun 2 as the best Total War game.

GameSpot reviewer Daniel Shannon has called it the "best Total War yet".

For their work on Total War: Shogun 2, Alan Blair (lead campaign programmer), Kevin McDowell (lead artist) and Scott Pitkethley (lead battle programmer) won the British Academy Games Award for best strategy game. During the 15th Annual Interactive Achievement Awards, the Academy of Interactive Arts & Sciences nominated Total War: Shogun 2 for "Strategy/Simulation Game of the Year".

As of 31 March 2011, the game has sold 600,000 units in Europe and North America.
