= Europa Barbarorum =

2005 video game mod

- Developer: Europa Barbarorum Development Team
- Engine: Europa Barbarorum: Rome: Total War engine Europa Barbarorum II: Medieval II: Total War: Kingdoms engine
- Platforms: Windows, Mac
- Release: Europa Barbarorum: 27 December 2005; Europa Barbarorum II: v2.35A R3.5 6 April 2022
- Genres: Real-time tactics, Turn-based strategy
- Modes: Single player, Multiplayer

Europa Barbarorum (Latin: Europe of the Barbarians), or EB, is a modification of the PC game Rome: Total War (RTW) based on the desire to provide Rome: Total War players with a more historically accurate game experience.

The basic gameplay mechanics of the original game remain the same. The player controls an empire with the goal of conquering as much territory as possible and eliminating rival factions, which are controlled by the computer, or AI. The main campaign is split between two gameplay modes: a turn-based strategy map for moving whole armies and managing the empire, and a real-time battle map for fighting battles on the ground between two or more armies. The two game modes are linked, with success or failure in one game mode influencing the chances of success or failure in the other.

Although set in a similar historical period and geographical area to the unmodified game (covering a timespan of 272 BC to 14 AD, compared to the original game's 270 BC to 14 AD), Europa Barbarorum is a total conversion modification as it replaces all the aspects of the original Rome: Total War game that can be replaced, such as unit models, statistics and the musical score. The modification has received favourable reviews in a number of computer gaming magazines. PC Gamer magazine ranks Europa Barbarorum as the best mod for any of the seven Total War games released for the PC at that time.

== Gameplay ==
In the original Rome: Total War, the player took control of an empire, or "faction", of classical Europe, North Africa or the Middle East, with the aim of expanding their faction's territory and eliminating rival empires through military conquest and city-building. Europa Barbarorum retains this basic gameplay mechanic and sets itself in a similar time period and geographical area to the original game. However, as a total conversion the mod replaces the particular factions, military units, buildings, and other elements present in the original game, and adds a new soundtrack and several brand-new gameplay mechanics not present in the original, such as the installation of puppet rulers. The modification's development team's stated aim in making the changes that they have to Rome: Total War is to make the player's experience of the ancient world more historically accurate. For this reason, numerous parameters of the game at the start of the campaign in 272 BC, such as generals' names, the diplomatic relations between factions, and the particular understanding of the outside world that each faction has, have been set to correspond to the actual political situation in that year.

Also for reasons of historical verisimilitude, factions, provinces on the campaign map and factions' family members have been given vernacular names in Europa Barbarorum, rather than having Latinized or Anglicized ones, as in Rome: Total War. So, for instance, the original game's Armenia faction is known as Hayasdan in Europa Barbarorum, and Germania as the Sweboz. Instead of having to play one's first campaign as a Roman faction and only subsequently unlock playable campaigns as non-Romans by defeating them in the Roman campaign, all twenty of Europa Barbarorum's playable factions can be accessed by the player from the start. Furthermore, the one unplayable and three playable Roman factions of the original have been combined into a single playable faction in Europa Barbarorum, the Romani. Dissatisfied with the homogeneity of the factions of the original Rome: Total War, the Europa Barbarorum development team has sought to differentiate the playing experiences of the game's different factions. So, for example, Rome: Total War's trait-acquisition system, where the player's faction's family members acquire certain characteristics and talents which make them more or less adept at certain tasks such as city management or military leadership, has been made more faction-specific in Europa Barbarorum, with Hellenic characters' traits, for instance, being based on Theophrastos' Characters and Aristotle's teachings on the Golden Mean, and Romans' traits being partially based on the moral tales of Valerius Maximus. There are sometimes additional requirements for a family member to be able to gain a new trait: in order for them to compete in one of the Panhellenic Games, for instance, the player must ensure that they are stationed in the appropriate city on the campaign map in the year that the competition is scheduled to take place. One reviewer has commented that Europa Barbarorum's expansions upon the original Rome: Total War's trait system have served to add a role-playing element to the game.

=== Campaign ===
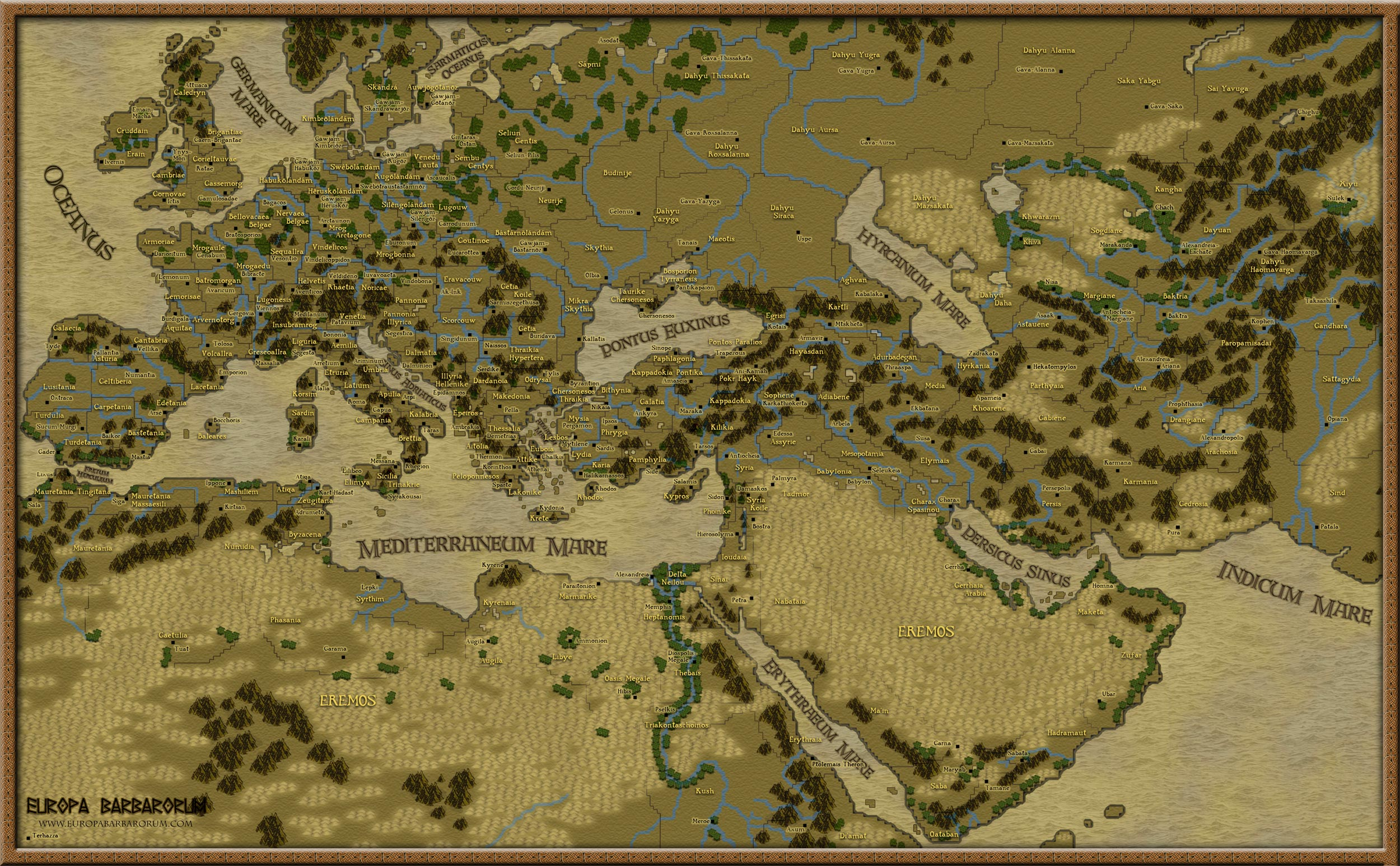
The Europa Barbarorum world map, correct for version 1.1

As in the original Rome: Total War, Europa Barbarorum's strategic campaign sees the player take control of a particular faction and then compete for territory and resources against all the other factions, which are controlled by the game's artificial intelligence. The player is presented with a map of Europe, North Africa and the Near East in which territory is divided into 200 provinces, each of which contains a province capital, which will at any given point be controlled either by the player's faction, a rival playable faction, or the non-playable Eleutheroi faction, which represents the world's minor kingdoms, regional powers and rebel states. If a faction should at any point find itself not in control of any provinces, it is eliminated from the game. Gameplay is turn-based, each turn representing the passage of three months on the campaign map (unlike the six months of the original Rome: Total War) and alternating between the player managing their empire and the artificial intelligence making all the other factions' moves. A key game mechanic of the campaign map is the annexation of territory, which is done province-by-province, either by successfully besieging the province capital, or by acquiring it from another faction through diplomacy. Once a faction has acquired a province, they may construct buildings in the province capital that either enable the recruitment of certain military units or grant various bonuses to the city, such as greater resilience during a siege or a decreased likelihood of the province rebelling. Provided the city contains the appropriate buildings, the player may recruit military units in the city at the same time as undertaking construction projects. The aim of the game is to acquire a specified number of provinces and/or eliminate specified rival factions (in Europa Barbarorum particular victory conditions differ for each faction), whilst avoiding being eliminated by the other factions.

The campaign map itself of Europa Barbarorum covers a wider geographical area than that of Rome: Total War, expanding into areas such as the Arabian Peninsula, India, Central Asia, and Scandinavia. Relief, province boundaries, snow boundaries, vegetation types, coastlines and areas prone to natural disaster in 272 BC have all been researched and implemented into the campaign map. The Nile–Red Sea canal linking the Indian Ocean and Mediterranean Sea has been added to the map, as have the great trade routes of the ancient world, such as the Amber and Silk Roads, which can be captured and exploited by the player or by the artificial intelligence.

The selection of factions present in the original Rome: Total War has been overhauled in Europa Barbarorum. The original game's Gaul faction has been replaced with two new factions, the Aedui and the Arverni. The Scythia faction has been replaced by the Sauromatae, and the Greek Cities faction (which included various city-states) has been replaced by the Koinon Hellenon (Ancient Greek: League of the Greeks), a faction which represents the Chremonidean League of Athens, Sparta and Rhodes. Entirely new factions include Baktria, a Central Asian Hellenic empire, and Epeiros, a western Greek faction famous for producing Pyrrhos of Epiros. On the other hand, the Numidia faction of Rome: Total War was removed entirely.

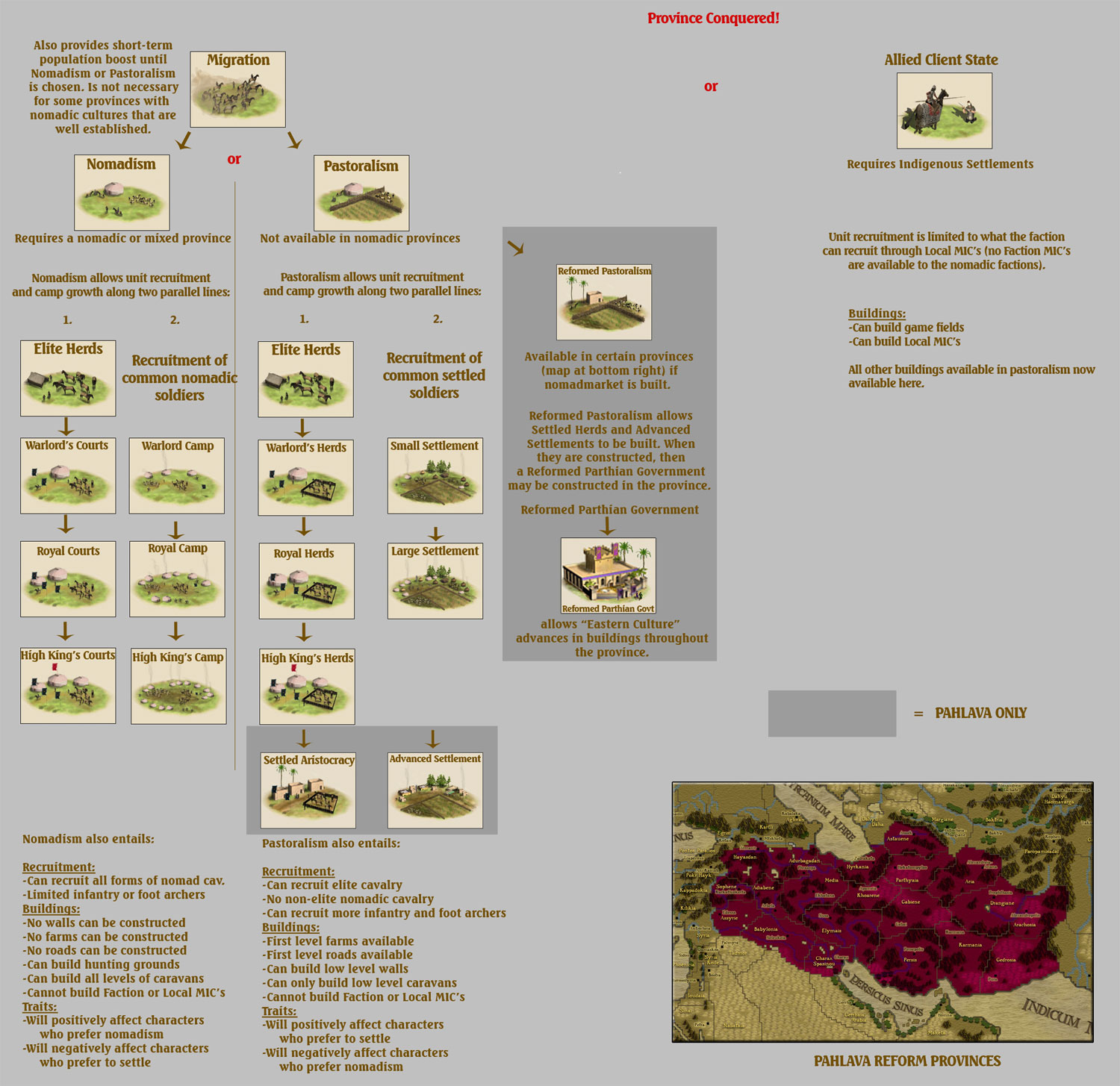
A diagram of the possible development of the governments of nomadic factions in Europa Barbarorum

The way in which factions enhance the provinces they own through the construction of new buildings in their province capitals has changed in Europa Barbarorum. The process of assimilating a newly conquered province into one's empire has become more differentiated in the modification than it was in the original game through the introduction of so-called "government buildings" and military–industrial complexes. Government buildings represent different degrees of central State intervention in a province, and range from a homeland government, which can only be built in a faction's traditional ethnic homeland and represents the highest possible degree of central State control, to an allied state government, which makes the province in question semi-autonomous and installs a puppet ruler to govern it on the controlling faction's behalf. The choice of government building in a province affects what other buildings can be constructed there: the greater the degree of autonomy granted to a province, the greater the shift in the make-up of the pool of buildings available for construction from the controlling faction's own buildings to native buildings; that is, buildings which are more closely associated with the faction that would make its traditional home in the province in question, rather than the one currently occupying it. Nomadic, desert- and steppe-dwelling factions have their own government buildings, which some say has helped differentiate between Europa Barbarorum's factions and make the differences between Europa Barbarorum and the original Rome: Total War more than just cosmetic. These government buildings also affect unit recruitment options in a province, through the mod's introduction of military–industrial complex ("MIC") buildings. The original Rome: Total War's system of constructing and subsequently upgrading different types of building in order to recruit different types of soldier (stables for horses, ranges for archers, and so on) has been replaced in Europa Barbarorum by the "factional MIC", which enables the recruitment of all the province-controlling faction's units, and the "regional MIC", which enables the recruitment of native types of soldier. How far the two types of complexes can be upgraded depends on the government of the province: the greater the autonomy of the province, the more the native MIC may be upgraded, and the less the factional MIC may be upgraded; and vice versa. In addition to buildings that can be constructed by the player, Europa Barbarorum also introduces a number of unique buildings or "wonders", which can either be man-made structures or features of the landscape, and which provide unique bonuses to the province.

=== Warfare ===
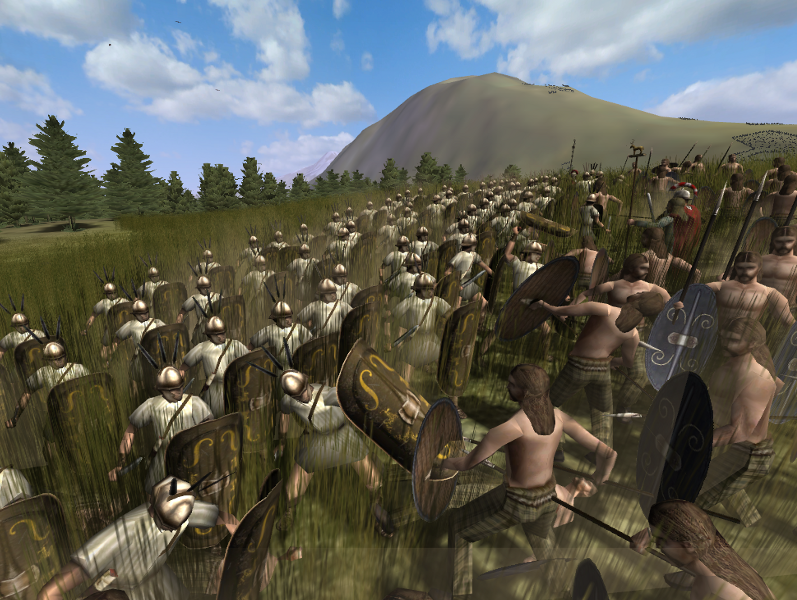
Screenshots of battles from Rome: Total War (top) and Europa Barbarorum (bottom)

If, during their turn on the campaign map, the player should engage one of their armies in combat with another faction's army, or if their troops should be engaged by another faction during the AI's turn, the player then has the option of fighting a real-time battle or siege. In this gameplay mode, the player directs the troops they had brought with them on the campaign map to the engagement, ordering them to manoeuvre and attack the enemy's troops on a three-dimensional battlefield. Troops can either be killed outright on the battlefield or made to rout and flee the field if their morale falls below a certain threshold. Reviewers have noted of Rome: Total War that, during a battle, troop numbers do not outweigh all other considerations; other factors such as individual unit types' strengths and soldiers' morale and fatigue at the point of fighting are also taken into account. A battle is won when one side kills or routs the entire enemy army; a siege may be won by the attacking side through either dispatching the opposing forces or gaining control of the besieged city's central plaza for a certain number of minutes, and by the defending side either by killing the attackers or by destroying their siege equipment before they have managed to breach the city's defences.

The make-up of the game's units is one of the areas in which the most change can be seen going from the original game to the mod. Reviewers have commented that the differences between Europa Barbarorum and its parent game are "immediate" and "striking" and that the modification is different from its parent game "in look and in play". Another reviewer described the mod as having a more "gritty, realistic look" than the original Rome: Total War. All the units that were present in the original game have been removed and replaced in Europa Barbarorum. Specific examples include the removal of several units that the Europa Barbarorum team considered to be historically doubtful or only marginally used in warfare, such as Arcani, incendiary pigs and Celtic head-hurlers from the original Rome: Total War. Nor was the modding team happy with the way more conventional forces were portrayed in the original game, for instance calling Rome: Total War's Egyptian soldiers "Mummy Returns Egyptians" and hence creating a new unit roster for the Egyptian faction in the game (named Egypt in the original Rome: Total War and the Ptolemaioi in Europa Barbarorum), in order to better correspond with the Ptolemaic period of history. The mod also features new custom battle formations in order to encourage more realistic behaviour from the AI.

== Audio ==
Europa Barbarorum features its own soundtrack, distinct from that of Rome: Total War. Some of its tracks were composed especially by Morgan Casey and Nick Wylie; others are examples of authentic music, the Celtic factions' tracks, for example, having been recorded by early music ensemble Prehistoric Music Ireland. Europa Barbarorum also includes its own "voicemod", an attempt by the developers to replace the English cries of Rome: Total War's soldiers with ones in their native languages, which include classical Latin, Celtic, and ancient Greek.

== Development ==
The Europa Barbarorum project began in January 2004, eight months before Rome: Total War's release, when the Europa Barbarorum development team who were following the game's development became concerned that its "barbarian" factions such as the Gauls were being portrayed inaccurately. The Europa Barbarorum team felt that such factions' representations in Rome: Total War conformed more to a Hollywood stereotype than to historical fact, and wished to see a more realistic portrayal of such factions in the game. The modding team tried to convince the Creative Assembly (CA), the developers of Rome: Total War, to alter their depiction of the period in line with the team's research, but the developers failed to take them up on their offer. Having exhausted this avenue for change, the Europa Barbarorum members then resolved to modify the game themselves upon its release.

== Release ==
Europa Barbarorum was first released to the public as an open beta in December 2005. After several more minor releases throughout 2006, which mostly fixed bugs and made small adjustments to the modification, the next major release of Europa Barbarorum was version 0.80 in December 2006. Its changes included the addition of the Sabaean faction, new music, and the inclusion of a new military–industrial complex system. There were three more 0.8-series releases during the first half of 2007, which primarily made minor adjustments to the modification and fixed bugs. In total, over 135,000 downloads of the 0.80–0.81 versions were tracked.

The next major release was version 1.0, which was released in October 2007 and included new units, new government options for the Pahlava and Hayasdan factions, the addition of a new type of wall to the battle map and new music from prehistoric music group Prehistoric Music Ireland. The 1.0 version was downloaded over 90,000 times in the six months following its release. This was followed by version 1.1, which was released in April 2008 and included new battle map landscapes, new units, the addition of the Pahlavi voicemod and the inclusion of an introduction video for the Saka Rauka faction. The current release is version 1.2, which contains the addition of the Punic voicemod and bug fixes; the development team had previously stated that future releases of Europa Barbarorum for the Rome: Total War engine will not include any major gameplay changes.

Europa Barbarorum has seen some significant changes to its campaign over the course of its development. The Yuezhi faction, included in early releases of the modification, was subsequently dropped. Earlier releases of Europa Barbarorum also featured player alerts representing the major stages of the breakup of the Seleukid faction, if that collapse occurred in the game. However, such features became impossible to implement after the SPQR faction of the original game, used in Europa Barbarorum for scripting purposes, was removed from the mod in exchange for the kingdom of Saba.

Following the main modification's release, a number of customisations of Europa Barbarorum have been created, such as porting it to run using the Rome: Total War: Barbarian Invasion executable, or Feral Interactive's Mac OS X version of Rome: Total War. There had been plans to release a version of the mod for the PC game Europa Universalis: Rome, but no Europa Barbarorum mod has yet been released for the strategy title.

=== Europa Barbarorum II ===
The Europa Barbarorum development team also developed a new version of the modification for the Medieval II: Total War: Kingdoms engine, which was named Europa Barbarorum II. The modification was designed to take advantage of the improved graphics of Medieval II: Total War and of its engine's additional features, such as the possibility of different soldiers within the same unit to have different appearances, as opposed to the "clones" criticised by some reviewers of Rome: Total War. Europa Barbarorum II includes new government, unit recruitment and trait systems, and new playable factions such as the kingdom of Gandhara, which has its own Sanskrit voicemod.

An initial version of Europa Barbarorum II v2.0 was released on 25 August 2014, with a second version (v2.01) released on 12 September 2014. On 21 December 2015, a third version (2.1b) was released and provided a number of improvements, such as an improved campaign AI/battle AI, remodelled battle map settlements, battle map vegetation, and new units with military reforms for various factions. Version 2.2b, which was released on 4 June 2016, contained the same new improvements.

== Reception ==
Europa Barbarorum was featured and reviewed in a number of video game magazines. It has been reviewed in PC Gamer UK twice, in March 2005 and February 2008. The 2008 review was overwhelmingly positive, saying that "EB feels like a whole new Total War game", and going on to praise the modification's "stunning" scope and the "striking" extent of the differences between it and Rome: Total War. The review was somewhat critical of the modification's graphical user interfaces which "[occasionally]" had a "home-made" feel to them, as well as its lack of accessibility and steep learning curve, although it adds that the second point is not a large problem as the modification is largely a "master's challenge for accomplished Rome players". The review finished on a positive note, summing Europa Barbarorum up as a "superior game". In 2010, the same magazine's website named Europa Barbarorum the best mod of any Total War game.

A number of non-English language magazines have also reviewed Europa Barbarorum. The Italian PC Gaming magazine Giochi per il mio computer reviewed the modification in April 2005 and March 2008. The 2005 review reported that the modification, whose development team included two historians, was to replace the "economic system, [soldiers'] equipment and the provinces" of Rome: Total War; the latter review praised the mod for having "altered and deepened" the gameplay of the original title, and wrote that Europa Barbarorum was the best substitute for a Rome 2: Total War game prior to the actual release of such a title. Dutch magazine PC Gameplay, reviewing the mod in March 2008, also wrote that the mod was "perhaps the best candidate for the title Rome: Total War II" "until the official announcement" and went on to note that the list of changes that the modification had made to the original game almost constituted "a history book of its own". The German magazine GameStar wrote in April 2007 that the Europa Barbarorum team had "banned all historical mistakes from the game"; in January 2011, another German publication, PC Games, also noted the mod's historical accuracy, singling out its "more realistic, more [challenging]" battles for praise, although it did note that the mod was squarely aimed at experienced Rome: Total War players. Reviewing version 0.74 of the mod in November 2006, Romanian publication LeveL concurred that the mod was aimed at experienced players, adding that the modified version of the game put greater demands on the player's computer than the original Rome: Total War, requiring 512 MB of RAM, up from the original's 256. Despite this, the reviewer praised the mod's complexity, the "painstaking detail" that went into making the units and the mod's soundtrack.

Europa Barbarorum has also received several online reviews. The modification received a review early into its development process on gaming website HeavenGames, which said that it was an "ambitious" project and praised its commitment to historical accuracy, even stating that the Europa Barbarorum development team was going to use satellite imagery and climate change statistics to accurately portray the world as it was in 272 BC. Later, in 2008, the modification has been reviewed on Boomtown, which praised the modification's "incredibly well-researched and -devised" unit stats system, as well as its "legion of historians". The modification has sometimes been mentioned as a recommended complement to Rome: Total War in reviews of the original title – for instance, by Norwegian gaming website Gamereactor in 2007.

In addition, Europa Barbarorum was singled out for praise by the Creative Assembly themselves in 2011, when they called the mod "breathtaking" in an official statement.

== See also ==
- Rome: Total Realism
