= Total War: Shogun 2: Fall of the Samurai =

Total War Shogun 2: Fall of the Samurai
- Box art
- Developer: Creative Assembly
- Publishers: Sega; Feral Interactive (macOS, Linux)
- Composer: Jeff van Dyck
- Series: Total War
- Engine: Warscape
- Platforms: Microsoft Windows macOS; Linux
- Release: 23 March 2012; 18 December 2014 (macOS); 23 May 2017 (Linux)
- Genres: Turn-based strategy, real-time tactics
- Modes: Single-player, multiplayer

Total War: Shogun 2: Fall of the Samurai is a standalone expansion to the strategy video game Total War: Shogun 2, released on 23 March 2012. Taking place 300 years after the events of the base game, Fall of the Samurai is set in mid-19th century Japan during the Bakumatsu and the Boshin War, which pits supporters of the ruling Tokugawa Shogunate against supporters of the Emperor, who wish to overthrow the Shogunate. The time period coincides with arrival of the Western powers, which forced Japan to modernize and eventually abolish its traditional samurai-based society and adopt modern technologies. The players takes on the management of one of the many domains on either side of the conflict and must help their side win the Boshin War.

The game was rebranded and released as a separate product Total War Saga: Fall of the Samurai on August 13, 2019.

== Gameplay ==
Fall of the Samurai features weapons from the late 1800s such as the Gatling gun.

Starting in 1864, the player develops their domain and adopts modern technologies to support either the Shogunate or the Imperial faction in the impending Boshin War. At the beginning of the campaign, pro-Shogunate domains control both Kyoto, the traditional capital of Japan, and Edo, the seat of shogunate power. Control of these two cities and dominance on the campaign map determines the outcome of the war.

The campaign map has been expanded from Shogun 2 to include additional provinces, including the previously absent island of Hokkaido in the north, as well as the islands of Tanegashima, Tsushima, and Gotō in the west.

To reflect the shorter time period of Fall of the Samurai—spanning from 1864 to 1876—the number of turns per year was increased from four to twenty-four (six turns per season). Armies move more slowly on the campaign map than in the base game, often requiring several turns to cross a single province. Railways can be constructed in certain provinces to allow rapid movement of armies.

At the start of the campaign, players can recruit traditional samurai units and levies similar to those in Shogun 2. By researching modern technologies and constructing military buildings, players can recruit Western-style units such as rifle-armed line infantry and artillery, including Gatling guns, which largely render traditional units obsolete.

Naval warfare features Western-style warships equipped with steam engines and broadside cannons. Naval battles resemble those seen in Empire: Total War and Napoleon: Total War. Warships can bombard enemy armies and provinces on the campaign map or provide fire support during battles, though this can be countered by stronger port defenses and upgraded castles.

A new feature in the Total War series allows players to manually operate artillery units and warships during battles. From a third-person perspective, players can aim and fire individual artillery pieces using the mouse.

The research system from Shogun 2 returns, divided between civil and military reforms. In Fall of the Samurai, the research tree is vertically divided into four tiers. Each tier requires a certain level of modernisation, which is achieved by constructing Western-style buildings. Higher tiers unlock more powerful units and buildings but increase unrest in provinces due to modernisation.

Religious systems from Shogun 2 are replaced by political allegiances. Provinces may support the Imperial faction, the Shogunate, or a Republic. Provinces with allegiances different from the player's faction suffer public order penalties, which can be mitigated through buildings and agents.

The "Realm Divide" mechanic from Shogun 2 also returns with changes. As the player gains fame by conquering territory and winning battles, they may become the leading domain for either the Emperor or the Shogunate. This causes all opposing factions to declare war on the player and prevents war declarations against allies. Alternatively, the player may establish a republic inspired by the historical Republic of Ezo, which results in all other factions gradually declaring war on the player.

The game uses an improved version of the Warscape engine, featuring enhanced campaign map visuals, improved water effects, and various performance improvements.

Including downloadable content, the game features ten playable factions—five Imperial and five Shogunate—each with unique advantages and playstyles.

=== Shogunate factions ===
- Aizu Domain, starting in Fukushima, specialises in traditional units and reduced castle construction costs.
- Nagaoka Domain, starting in Echigo Province, focuses on modern units and increased income from commercial buildings.
- Jōzai Domain, starting in Kazusa Province, emphasises guerrilla warfare and faster army movement in battles.
- Obama Domain, starting in Wakasa Province, benefits from higher tax income and reduced upkeep for land units.
- Sendai Domain, starting in Miyagi, excels in diplomacy and reduced public order penalties.

All Shogunate factions can recruit the unique sword unit Shōgitai and the line infantry unit Shinsengumi Police Force.

=== Imperial factions ===
- Satsuma Domain, starting in Satsuma Province and Ōsumi Province, has stronger administration and begins with two provinces.
- Chōshū Domain, starting in Nagato Province, specialises in modern military development and aggressive combat bonuses.
- Tosa Domain, starting in Tosa Province, has naval advantages and improved bombardment range.
- Saga Domain, starting in Nagasaki, begins with established Western trade and improved artillery units.
- Tsu Domain, starting in Iga Province, focuses on ninja agents and improved province conversion abilities.

== Reception ==
Reception

Aggregate score
Aggregator	Score
Metacritic	86/100

Review scores
Publication	Score
Eurogamer	8 of 10
IGN	9/10
PC Gamer (UK)	89%

During the 16th Annual D.I.C.E. Awards, the Academy of Interactive Arts & Sciences nominated Shogun 2: Fall of the Samurai for "Strategy/Simulation Game of the Year" and "Outstanding Achievement in Visual Engineering".
