= Medieval II: Total War: Kingdoms =

Medieval II: Total War Kingdoms
- Developer: Creative Assembly (Note: Ported to Linux, OS X, Android, and iOS by Feral Interactive.)
- Publisher: Sega (Note: Published for Linux, OS X, Android, and iOS by Feral Interactive.)
- Designers: William Davis; Taamati Te Rata; Richard Lagarto; Dan Lehtonen; Brendan Rogers; Penny Sweetser; Dan Toose; Jason Turnbull
- Series: Total War
- Platforms: Windows, Linux, OS X, Android, iOS
- Release: Windows: NA: 28 August 2007; EU: 31 August 2007; AU: 6 September 2007; Linux, OS X: WW: 14 January 2016; Android, iOS: WW: 10 November 2022
- Genres: Real-time tactics, turn-based strategy
- Modes: Single-player, Multiplayer

Medieval II: Total War Kingdoms is the expansion to the 2006 turn-based strategy PC game Medieval II: Total War. It was developed by Creative Assembly. The expansion was released on 28 August 2007 in North America and adds four campaigns.

== Campaigns ==
Kingdoms has four new campaigns, each one focusing on a different geographical area during a period of great change in its history.

- "Americas" campaign: covering the Americas during European colonization;
- "Britannia" campaign: covering the series of wars (including the Welsh Conquest, the Irish Invasion, the Scottish–Norwegian War, the Scottish War of Independence and the Barons' Rebellion) fought on British Isles during the 13th century;
- "Crusades" campaign: covering the Third and Fourth Crusades; and
- "Teutonic" campaign: covering the Northern Crusades.

== Americas campaign ==
Beginning in 1521, the Americas campaign depicts the early period of the Age of Navigation, during which the European powers sought new land through colonisation. The Spanish must struggle to explore an unknown land filled with violent natives, while the Indigenous peoples attempt to stall the Spanish invasion and simultaneously expand their lands at the expense of their neighbors.

=== Notable features ===
This campaign depicts various conquistador armies that travelled to the New World by spawning large, formidable armies in the Americas with allegiance to the Spanish. Once spawned, the Spain faction can use these armies however they see fit. French and English forces will show up in the same way: the French appear in Louisiana and the English in Honduras.

These conquistador forces are made up of limited numbers of expensive but formidable European units, who are frequently supplemented by local native mercenaries. The native factions have weaker units with limited armor, but their incredibly inexpensive upkeep allows them to field a large number of them, and they often have high morale.

When the player progresses through the campaign playing as New Spain, the player will be presented with missions from the King of Spain, and when sufficient influence is gained, the player may be granted a higher title of nobility such as Baron, Count, etc. These titles unlock more advanced building levels for the player to use.

The Apachean Tribes faction has access to the "warpath" ability, which is a shamanistic counterpart to the jihad in the main campaign. The Apache can also learn from the technologies of European factions—after battling a European faction such as New Spain, the Apache will be able to construct gun trading tipis and horse trainers, unlocking new, more technologically advanced units (such as cavalry and musketeers, which the faction initially lacks). The Chichimeca can also use enemy technology to their advantage.

All of the factions adhering to the "Sun God" religion are able to sacrifice units instead of disbanding them. They can also sacrifice populations upon capturing a settlement or they can sacrifice captured enemy troops. Sacrificing upholds the religion of the Sun God and increases the happiness of the local populace.

== Britannia campaign ==
At the beginning of the Britannia campaign in 1258, the British Isles are in chaos. The Kingdom of England exercises influence over most of the Isles, but its power is contested from several theatres. In the far west, on Irish soil, England tenuously holds a network of fortresses that keep the Irish at bay. However, the Gaelic chieftain Brian O'Neill has succeeded in rallying the Gaelic Irish, and despite their lack of heavy infantry, with a strong push they may seize the island. On the Marches, Prince Llywelyn ap Gruffudd of the Principality of Wales threatens the lightly held English border fortresses. In the north, the English are allied with the fierce Scots, but this bond is untenable, and the only remaining question is when war with the Scottish kingdom will erupt. Finally, the warlike Norwegians are returning to the Isles, having held the Isle of Man and the Hebrides for some time, their king coming personally to oversee the conquest of Britannia. England is the largest and richest faction in the isles, however they are very thinly spread, and incursions into their territories from the Welsh, Irish and even perhaps the Scots or Norwegians, seem inevitable unless action is taken. Perhaps worst of all, dissent smolders within its own borders, in the form of the Barons' Alliance, which threatens to unify into a full-fledged rebellion. Time will tell who can come through blood and iron to unite Britannia.

=== Notable features ===
The campaign map features the presence of permanent stone forts placed in strategic locations, which can be garrisoned and provide free upkeep for a small number of units. These structures can hold out for a brief time against sieges and are automatically repaired after each battle.

Certain units can only be trained if that faction's culture is high enough in a settlement, making expansion into conquered land more difficult. As all factions are Catholic, culture has replaced religion in the campaign and priest units are unavailable.

A special, unplayable faction—the Barons' Alliance—is similar in gameplay terms to the Eastern and Western Roman Rebels from Rome: Total War: Barbarian Invasion. When characters, armies and settlements under English control rebel, they will become part of the Baron's Alliance, a faction with essentially the same strengths and weaknesses of the English faction, including the ability to utilise diplomacy and agents to achieve their goals.

Every faction gets paid an additional amount of florins every turn. This payment is referred to as "the King's Purse". In Medieval II: Total War, some factions had a high king's purse payment and some had a low payment. Rather than having a fixed king's purse, each faction in the Britannia Campaign has a dynamic king's purse—the sum of money a faction is paid every turn can change.

A number of special historical figures, including King Edward I, William Wallace, Prince Llywelyn ap Gruffudd, High King Brian O'Neill and King Haakon IV of Norway, appear either at the start of the campaign or at some later point. Though they lack the special abilities of the hero characters from the Crusades campaign, they usually possesses unique traits and are accompanied by a large army.

If any of the starting Welsh settlements are captured by the English, Welsh insurgents rise up in an attempt to recapture the settlements. The quality of the units in the rebel army will depend on which settlement is captured—for example, the rebel army will be very strong if the starting Welsh capital—Caernarvon—is captured, and it is a weaker army if smaller Welsh settlements, such as Pembroke, are conquered. A notable historical inaccuracy in this respect is that Caernarvon, the Welsh capital, did not have a castle until 1283, despite the campaign beginning in 1258, and was no more than a minor town at the time. The actual capital of Wales in the period, Abergwyngregyn, is not represented in the game.

== Crusades campaign ==
Beginning in 1174, the Crusades Campaign is set several years prior to the outbreak of the Third Crusade and continues into the Fourth Crusade and beyond. It follows the Kingdom of Jerusalem led by Richard the Lionheart and the Principality of Antioch led by Philip Augustus as they attempt to strengthen the presence of Christendom in the Holy Lands, whilst the Zengid Emirate led by Nur ad-Din Zangi and the Ayyubid Sultanate led by Saladin attempt to drive them out. Meanwhile, the Byzantine Empire led by Emperor Manuel Komnenos slowly moves into the Middle East to regain its lost glory, and attempts to drive back the armies of the Turks as well as deal with the rebels and the Venetians that harass them in the west.

=== Notable features ===
Generals in the Crusades campaign have the ability to construct permanent forts that remain even after vacated by troops.

The Principality of Antioch and Kingdom of Jerusalem may make use of the Knights Hospitaller and Knights Templar, respectively, thus giving them access to unique units - of whom only one of each may be present on the campaign map at one time.

Each of the five playable factions owns a single region designated as a "Power Centre", with the loss of these centres dealing a major blow to that faction. For example, the loss of a faction's Power Centre will prevent the recruitment of certain troop types. Should a Power Centre be lost, reinforcements will often be sent to assist in recapturing that settlement.

In addition, there are some events that can aid or hamper the player's faction. Namely, some of these are the Fourth Crusade (the arrival of two large Venetian armies near Constantinople, which can threaten the Byzantine player), the Mameluke rebellion of 1250 (when the Mamluk dynasty seized power in Egypt, giving the player a powerful Mamluk army under Baybars), the Mongol invasion of the Middle East (which can prove threatening to any player), and the rise of Osman I, which gives the Turks a reformed army called Janissaries.

==== Heroes ====
Each playable faction has access to a single "Hero" character. These powerful individuals possess special abilities capable of turning the tide of battle.

| Faction | Hero | Ability |
|---|---|---|
| Kingdom of Jerusalem | King Richard | Heart of the Lion: Immediately rallies any routing units. |
| Ayyubid Sultanate | Saladin | Righteousness of Faith: Briefly sets all non-routing units' morale to full. |
| Zengid Emirate | Nur ad-Din Zangi | Light of the Faith: Briefly increases attack speed and morale of troops. |
| Byzantine Empire | Manuel Komnenos | Byzantine Politics: Causes infighting amongst an enemy unit, essentially removing them from play until order is restored or they are attacked. It can only be used once per battle. |
| Principality of Antioch | Philip Augustus | Flower of Chivalry: Briefly increases attack power and stamina of troops. |

== Teutonic campaign ==
Starting from the year 1250 in the middle of the Northern Crusades, the Teutonic campaign centres around the conflict between Christianity—spearheaded by the State of the Teutonic Order—and Baltic Paganism—represented by the Grand Duchy of Lithuania. The Teutonic order are ruthless and are a threat not only to the Pagans but to the other countries also. Novgorod lies in the far east of the Baltic area and guard their rich city jealously. They have triumphed over the Teutonic Order in the past, but since then the Order has been rapidly expanding. Novgorod must build up their forces if they want to survive. The Grand Duchy of Lithuania is desperate to drive off the Teutonic Order. If they want to be victorious, they must make use of their thick forests and quick forces to drive out the Order. However, after much pressure from many of the Catholic factions the path of Catholicism may be inevitable for Lithuania. Lying to the west, the Danes hope to unite Scandinavia and from there launch attacks on the rest of the Baltic area. However, the mighty Holy Roman Empire lies directly to their south, and the Danes must make good use of their mass fleets if they hope to defeat their many enemies. As the Teutonic Knights' campaign against the Lithuanians continue, the Kingdom of Poland just to their south, having originally requested the Knights to deal with Lithuania, regret their decision, seeing the destruction brought by the Knights. Wanting to right their wrong, they turn on the Teutonic Knights and wage war on them.

=== Notable features ===
Crusading nobles, drawn to the conflict against Paganism in search of fame and glory, will request the assistance of the Teutonic Order in return for donations to the Order's coffers. The size of the donation varies depending on the nobles' successes. The Lithuanian leader will be rewarded by his council of nobles in events should he manage to kill any of these crusaders.

When playing as Denmark, it is possible for the player to form the Union of Kalmar. In order to do this, the player must first take the Scandinavian settlements of Kalmar, Gothenburg, Visby, Uppsala and Åbo. After taking control of these settlements, the player must then kill the Norwegian king, either through assassination or a direct battle. If the entire Norway faction is eliminated, it is impossible to form the union. After forming the union, Denmark will take on a new banner, gain access to all the existing settlements and armies of Norway, and unlock the ability to build three new units.

Early in the campaign, an event will herald the formation of the Hanseatic League. The League consists of five specific regions on the campaign map—Hamburg, Danzig, Visby, Riga and Novgorod—which represent the group's most important assets. The faction controlling the most of these settlements has the greatest chance to be offered the option of building the Hanseatic League Headquarters, a unique building that provides significant financial rewards.

==== Features of the Teutonic Order ====
Due to the unique nature of the Teutonic Order, it lacks a family tree, thus leaving princesses and certain diplomatic options closed to them but making the faction less vulnerable to assassins. Instead, it is led by a Hochmeister, who, upon death, will be replaced by the most able General among the Order's ranks.

Finally, the Order's best units can only be recruited in heavily Catholic areas. Recruiting units such as Christ Knights, Halbbrüder and Ritterbrüder thus requires an extremely high percentage of Catholics to be present in Teutonic-controlled regions.

The Teutonic Order's strength is in its powerful heavy units. While lacking in speed, and thus vulnerable to horse archers on the open field, the Order's units more than make up for it in very powerful defensive strength. They are particularly effective in assaulting settlements, where the close quarters nullify their opponents' advantage of mobility.

==== Features of Lithuania ====
Lithuania starts out as a Pagan faction, offering it the chance to utilise a number of powerful and unique units to make up for its technological shortcomings. There are a number of different building options in a settlement that allow the faction to devote temples to three different Pagan deities. However, whilst following Paganism, Lithuania is unable to advance settlements beyond City or Castle level.

At some point during the campaign, Lithuania will be presented with the option of converting to Christianity. Whilst this can cause significant unrest and will force the faction to remove any Pagan-specific buildings, units and agents, it will also unlock new building options and make Lithuania a less tempting target to the Christian factions that surround it.

== Reception ==
Reception

Aggregate score
| Aggregator | Score |
|---|---|
| Metacritic | 85/100 |

Review scores
| Publication | Score |
|---|---|
| Eurogamer | 8/10 |
| Game Informer | 9/10 |
| GameSpot | 8/10 |
| GameSpy | 4/5 |
| IGN | 8.4/10 |
| PC Gamer (US) | 91% |

The expansion pack received "favorable" reviews according to the review aggregation website Metacritic. Games for Windows: The Official Magazine gave it a score of eight out of ten.
