= Barbarian Invasion =

Barbarian Invasion may refer to:

- The so-called 'barbarian invasions' contemporaneous with the fall of the Roman Empire
- Barbarian Invasion (film), written and directed by Tan Chui Mui (2021)
- The Barbarian Invasions (Les Invasions barbares), a movie by Denys Arcand
- Rome Total War: Barbarian Invasion, an expansion pack in the Rome: Total War computer game
