= Sheep (video game) =

2000 video game

- Developer: Mind's Eye Productions Additional work by: Capcom (GBA)
- Publisher: Empire Interactive
- Platforms: PlayStation, Microsoft Windows, Game Boy Advance, Mac OS X
- Release: PlayStation & Windows: NA: 7 November 2000 (PS); EU: 17 November 2000; NA: 29 November 2000 (PC); EU: 14 August 2008 (PSN); Mac OS X July 2001; Game Boy Advance: EU: 15 March 2002
- Genres: Strategy, puzzle
- Mode: Single-player

Sheep is a strategy puzzle video game released for PlayStation, Microsoft Windows and Game Boy Advance. In 2001 it was released for Mac OS X by Feral Interactive. The Game Boy Advance version was released in March 2002 in the EU, while the intended North American release was cancelled for unknown reasons.

== Gameplay ==
Sheep bears some similarity to the video game Lemmings. The player can choose between 4 herders, the people Adam Halfpint and Bo Peep, and the dogs Motley and Shep.

The player must then guide sheep of 4 types (Factorial, Longwool, NeoGenetic, and Pastoral), actually aliens from the planet Ovis Aries, through a series of obstacles to the finish line in the level.

There are a series of different worlds, starting with Polygon Farm and on to others, such as Village Fete and Lost in Space. If the players collect all the golden sheep trophies in a world, they will unlock a bonus game, where they for example, are riding a sheep, and have to collect trapped sheep in bubbles.

There are several obstacles that vary from world to world, including tractors, knights, archers and demonic chefs. Eventually, the players must thwart the schemes of the mad scientist Mr. Pear and his hench-cows.

== Reception ==
Reception

Aggregate score
Aggregator	Score			
Aggregator	GBA	Macintosh	PC	PS
Metacritic	67/100	N/A	73/100	71/100

Review scores
Publication	Score			
Publication	GBA	Macintosh	PC	PS
CNET Gamecenter	N/A	N/A	N/A	5/10
Electronic Gaming Monthly	N/A	N/A	N/A	6/10
EP Daily	N/A	N/A	7/10	7/10
Eurogamer	N/A	N/A	7/10	N/A
Famitsu	28/40	N/A	N/A	24/40
Game Informer	N/A	N/A	7.5/10	N/A
GameRevolution	N/A	N/A	C−	N/A
GameSpot	N/A	N/A	6.8/10	7.7/10
IGN	6.5/10	N/A	7.6/10	7/10
Macworld	N/A	3.5/5	N/A	N/A
Next Generation	N/A	N/A	4/5	N/A
Nintendo Power	4.4/5	N/A	N/A	N/A
Official U.S. PlayStation Magazine	N/A	N/A	N/A	3/5
PC Gamer (US)	N/A	N/A	79%	N/A

Sheep received "mixed or average reviews" on all platforms according to the review aggregation website Metacritic. AllGame gave the PC version four stars out of five, praising the graphics, soundtrack, controls and its "addictive" gameplay, but noted the occasional difficulty in herding the sheep in some instances, and that the concept of controlling the sheep becomes more challenging at more difficult levels. Dave Markell of Computer Games Strategy Plus gave the same PC version four stars out of five, saying, "While Sheep isn't a good choice for the die-hard fragger on your shopping list, puzzle fans, Monty Python lovers, bad punsters, and anyone with fond memories of Lemmings will find hours of challenging fun within this appealingly ridiculous game." GameZone's reviewer gave it seven out of ten, saying, "the awkwardness of the gameplay aspects greatly diminish[es] an otherwise fine product in my eyes." Reviewing the same PC version, Daniel Erickson of NextGen was positive to graphics and gameplay, and considered the game to be similar to Lemmings. In Japan, where the PlayStation version was ported and published by Syscom on 14 June 2001, followed by the Game Boy Advance version by Capcom under the name Hitsuji no Kimochi (ひつじのキモチ。; lit. "Sheep's Feelings") on 19 April 2002, Famitsu gave it a score of 28 out of 40 for the latter version, and 24 out of 40 for the former. Nintendo Power gave the GBA version a favorable review a few months before its supposed release date, before it was canceled for unknown reasons. Star Dingo of GamePro called it a "sleeper puzzle game". (Note: GamePro gave the Game Boy Advance version's European import two 3.5/5 scores for graphics and sound, and two 4/5 scores for control and fun factor. Although the game's status says "Available now", the magazine was unaware that the game's release in North America was actually canceled.)

Computer Games Strategy Plus nominated the PC version for their 2000 "Classic Game of the Year" award, whose winner remains unknown.
