= Rome: Total War: Alexander =

2006 video game

Rome Total War: Alexander
- Developers: Creative Assembly; Feral Interactive (macOS)
- Publishers: Sega; Feral Interactive (macOS)
- Director: Ian Roxburgh
- Designers: Melvyn Quek; James Whitston; Jeff Woods; Stephen Virgo; Alan Blair
- Series: Total War
- Platforms: Microsoft Windows macOS iOS; Android
- Release: Microsoft Windows: NA: 19 June 2006; EU: 15 September 2006; macOS: WW: 27 February 2014; iPad: WW: 27 July 2017; iPhone & Android: WW: 24 October 2019
- Genres: Real-time tactics, Turn-based strategy
- Modes: Single-player, multiplayer

Rome: Total War: Alexander promotional screenshot.

Rome: Total War: Alexander is the second expansion pack for Rome: Total War. It is set in an earlier time period, putting the player in the role of Alexander the Great. It begins with Alexander's ascension to the Macedonian throne in 336 BC and lasts for 100 turns. The game is much the same as the original Rome: Total War, but with fewer factions, different units, and a different map. The expansion was released in 2006 for Microsoft Windows. The macOS version of Rome: Total War: Alexander was released on 27 February 2014 by Feral Interactive. A standalone version of the expansion, also by Feral, was released for the iPad on 27 July 2017. An iPhone and Android version of the game was released on 24 October 2019.

== Gameplay ==
The gameplay of Alexander is mostly similar to the gameplay of the original Rome: Total War, with the player commanding individual armies on the battlefield or leading their entire nation (called factions) on a campaign map.

=== Campaign ===
The main campaign of Alexander centers around Alexander the Great's conquest of the Persian Empire. While multiple factions were playable in the original game's campaign, Macedon is in the only playable faction in the campaign of Alexander. As Macedon, the player must conquer 30 provinces, including a number of specific cities like Tyre, Halicarnassus, and Babylon, from Persia and various "barbarians," like the Thracians, the Illyrians, the Scythians, and the Dahae. The player only has 100 turns to complete their objectives. Alexander himself must also survive until the player accomplishes their goals; if he dies, the player is defeated. The campaign is narrated by Brian Blessed.

=== Historical battles ===
In addition to the regular campaign, there are also six historical battles in the expansion, starting with the Battle of Chaeronea, where Alexander accompanies his father, Philip II, against the combined forces of Athens and Thebes. Next is the Battle of the Granicus against Memnon of Rhodes. After the Battle of the Granicus comes the Siege of Halicarnassus, in which Memnon is killed. The fourth and fifth battles are the Battle of Issus and the Battle of Gaugamela, respectively. Both are fought against King Darius III of Persia. It ends with the Battle of the Hydaspes against Porus, an Indian king of the Pauravas dynasty. As in the campaign, if Alexander dies during one of the historical battles, the player is defeated. If Alexander retreats, the player is also defeated. While the first battle is available by default, the subsequent battles can only be unlocked by beating the previous battle at "medium" difficulty or above. The battles can be replayed at any time after being unlocked.

== Reception ==
Reception

Aggregate score
Aggregator	Score
Metacritic	79/100

Review scores
Publication	Score
Eurogamer	7/10
GameSpot	8.5/10
GameSpy	3/5
IGN	8/10
PC Gamer (UK)	86%
X-Play	3/5

The expansion pack received "generally favorable reviews" according to the review aggregation website Metacritic. Many reviewers concluded that while the expansion offered some new content for dedicated fans of the Total War series, the short length and limited scope of the expansion harmed what was otherwise a good experience.
