= Empire: Total War =

2009 video game

- British cover art. Regional variations show respective nations' colours and uniforms.
- Developer: Creative Assembly (Note: Android, iOS, Linux, and OS X versions developed and published by Feral Interactive)
- Publisher: Sega
- Director: Michael M. Simpson
- Producer: Ross Manton
- Designer: James Russell
- Artist: Kevin McDowell
- Composers: Walter Mair; Richard Beddow
- Series: Total War
- Platforms: Windows; OS X; Linux; Android; iOS
- Release: 3 March 2009: Windows; NA: 3 March 2009; WW: 4 March 2009 OS X; WW: 11 June 2014 Linux; WW: 9 December 2014 Android, iOS; WW: 21 November 2024
- Genres: Turn-based strategy, real-time tactics, grand strategy
- Modes: Single-player, multiplayer

Empire: Total War is a turn-based strategy and real-time tactics video game developed by Creative Assembly and published by Sega. The fifth instalment in the Total War series, the game was released in 2009. The game, which focuses on the early modern period of the 18th century, was announced at the Leipzig Games Convention in August 2007. Feral Interactive released the game for OS X and Linux in 2014, and for Android and iOS in 2024.

Players choose an 18th-century faction and set out to achieve domination over the known world through military force, diplomacy, espionage and economics. The interface and play are similar to earlier Total War titles. Although the campaign element of the game is turn-based, players can direct battles in real time. Empire: Total War is the first game in the series to allow naval battles to be conducted in real-time. In addition to the standard campaign mode, a special campaign follows the development of the United States from the settlement of Jamestown to the American War of Independence. The game includes five playable historical battles: the Battle of Fontenoy, Battle of Rossbach, Battle of Pondicherry (called Battle of Porto Novo in game), Battle of Brandywine Creek and Battle of Lagos.

Empire: Total War was met with universal acclaim; several critics commended it as one of the foremost strategy titles of recent times. Praise was bestowed upon the extensive strategic breadth, accurate historical challenges and visual effects. The real-time land battles, with a far greater focus on gunpowder weaponry than earlier Total War titles, were considered successful. Criticisms focused on shortcomings with the game's artificial intelligence and on the real-time naval battles being difficult to control and coordinate. The game was a commercial success, topping sales charts within a week of release; nevertheless, several Creative Assembly employees later commented on various issues caused by a perceived early release.

== Gameplay ==
Empire: Total War is focused on exploration, economics, politics, religion, the founding of colonies and, ultimately, conquest. The game is set in the early modern period from 1700 until the end of the 18th century, allowing players to lead various nations and attempt to dominate Europe, the Middle East, India, North America and the Caribbean, along with the maritime trade theatres of the South American coast, Gulf of Guinea, Mozambique Channel and the East Indies. As with previous Total War games, Empire: Total War consists of two separate areas of gameplay: a turn-based geopolitical campaign that allows the user to deploy complex strategies by moving armies and navies across the globe, conducting diplomacy, trade, espionage, and managing the internal politics of their nation, as well as a real-time battle mode that enables players to command military forces in battle both on land and at sea.

The game features over fifty 18th-century factions; however, only eleven of the most powerful and influential are playable. In western Europe, these are Great Britain, France, the United Provinces, Spain and Sweden, and in central and eastern Europe, Prussia, Austria, Russia and Poland–Lithuania. In the Balkans and the Middle East, the Ottoman Empire is the principal faction. On the Indian subcontinent, the Maratha Confederacy and the Mughal Empire are the major powers, the latter being non-playable. The New World colonies of the major powers are represented as protectorates of their home nation. The establishment of new nations during the era, such as Revolutionary France and the United States is reflected in the game, although these major events may be averted by player actions. Smaller factions, such as the German and Italian states, Native American tribes, and North African countries such as Morocco, are represented.

A story-driven campaign entitled "Road to Independence" is included, allowing the player to guide the foundation of the United States of America in three structured chapters. The first sees the player establish and develop the English colony of Jamestown, the second focuses on George Washington seeking to expel the French from the Ohio Valley in the French and Indian War, whilst the third has the player directing the American Continental Army against the British in the War of Independence. This campaign is goal-oriented and strictly historical and also functions as a tutorial for the gameplay, both military, economic and political. Completion of "Road to Independence" unlocks the newly formed United States to use in a shorter, later version of the full campaign.

=== Campaign ===
In the main campaign of Empire: Total War, the player selects a faction and aims to forge a global empire during the 18th century. Factions controls various historical provinces and have a regional capital, and a number of other settlements ranging from minor villages to prosperous sea ports. Players can recruit armies and navies to take and defend provinces by military means, or adopt diplomacy and politics to make advances in the game. Players can use economics and religion to their advantage, as well as clandestine means such as espionage and assassination. The campaign mode is turn-based, with each turn representing six months starting in summer or winter, allowing the player to attend to all needs of their faction before ending their turn and allowing the artificial intelligence to make all other factions' moves.

The campaign mode has been redesigned from earlier games to reflect early modern politics and economics.

The campaign mode is similar to those in Rome: Total War and Medieval II: Total War, but with several enhancements. It features three main theatres of play: Europe (which includes North Africa and the Middle East), the Americas, and the Indian subcontinent, and four minor trade theatres: the East Indies, the Ivory Coast, the Straits of Madagascar and Brazil. The way provinces work has been decentralised: although a central settlement is still used, other locations within a province can generate trade and technology, allowing factions to disrupt a province's productivity without assaulting the main settlement.

Diplomacy, taxation, and trade have been streamlined to reduce the need for micromanagement, including allowing the player to appoint ministers to govern the nation. Previous Total War games required the player to promote a governor for each major city, whereas in Empire ministers' qualifications affect the government of all cities, modified in each case by the size of the metropolitan administration, reflecting the shift from premodern city-statehood to modern nation-statehood.

The wandering scholars, spies, emissaries and assassins used in previous titles to deal with diplomacy, trade and espionage have been replaced with just three units: gentlemen, rakes, and missionaries. Gentlemen handle research and can challenge other characters to a duel, eliminating the diplomatic risk of being implicated in an assassination plot. Rakes perform clandestine tasks such as spying, assassination, and sabotage. Missionaries serve to convert the populace to the state religion, which reduces religious unrest and softens cultural unrest.

Isomorphic units also exist for the Ottomans, Persians, and other near eastern nations, replacing rakes with Hashashin, while Indian nations use Thugees for the same purposes, and all nations south and east of the Ottoman Empire use Eastern Scholars instead of gentlemen, although these cannot duel. The isomorphic religious leaders are Catholic, Eastern Orthodox, and Protestant missionaries, Imams, and Brahmin. The way armies are produced also differs: in addition to being produced at settlements, generals can now build their armies in the field by recruiting from nearby settlements. Players can now research technologies along a technology tree, advancing in areas such as infrastructure, politics, agriculture and the military.

Changes in government may occur during the campaign, for example as a consequence of a rise in republicanism. The United States may only come into existence if the ruling British Empire is unable to maintain social order. In addition, nations with highly unpopular governments and a history of workers' unrest may experience revolutions similar to the French Revolution. When the middle or upper classes become disenchanted with a current government, a civil war or revolt may occur. Upon revolution, the player can choose to side with the rebels or with the loyalists. The type of government selected by the player will determine how other factions view the player and influence their diplomatic relations.

In January 2009, after the delay of the release of Empire: Total War, the addition of a full campaign multiplayer mode was unveiled. The technology to create a multiplayer campaign game was not available in previous Total War games, and the extended development, due to the delayed release, allowed the Creative Assembly to implement the underlying technology for such a mode in Empire: Total War. On 7 December 2009 Sega released keys for a beta multiplayer campaign where two players could play online together as separate nations. Eventually, due to the incomplete and buggy nature of the beta alongside other development focuses, it was cancelled, never being fully patched into the game. In 2013, CA's community team released some additional keys for fans of the game, so they could play the incomplete multiplayer beta. Even after the closing date at the end of 2013, beta keys for the campaign was still available from Sega customer support.

=== Warfare ===
The second major area of gameplay is the battle system. Unlike the campaign game, here players control battles in real time. As with all titles in the series after Shogun: Total War, battles can take place on both land and at sea. Empire is the first to allow naval battles to be fought in real-time. In previous titles, they were automatically resolved by the game's artificial intelligence. Automatic resolution of battles remains an option for both land and sea battles. Separately from the main campaign game, players can recreate individual historical battles in the 18th century and early 19th century.

Land-based combat features a greater focus on gunpowder weaponry than in previous games.

In land engagements, players have an 18th-century army consisting of units such as cavalry, musketeers, riflemen and artillery. Each has its own intrinsic advantages, disadvantages, cost, and overall effectiveness. Players must use 18th-century tactics and formations to defeat their enemies. The battlefield terrain and the weather are also important. Factions can lay siege to settlements, replacing open land battles with street fighting and close-quarter combat.

Each unit has morale, which increases if the battle goes well, or decreases after heavy casualties, army losses, coming under artillery bombardment, or with the death of the general. Tactical situations such as attacking from a flank or the rear, or depriving a unit of allied reinforcements, also hit morale. When a unit's morale is sufficiently depleted, it will be routed and flee the battlefield. Depending on whether morale is merely broken or entirely shattered, the player may be able to rally the unit and regroup.

Victory is achieved by causing every enemy unit to rout, or annihilated. Sieges can be won if the attacker manages to take control of the settlement's central square for a set amount of time. Empire: Total War introduces several new battlefield elements to the Total War series. Units can take cover behind walls or in buildings, allowing increased interactivity with the terrain and making some buildings points of tactical importance. Field defences may be constructed on the battlefield. Infantry units can also scale small obstacles such as walls and fences. Each unit has capabilities such as Square Formation, Wedge, Diamond, Equip bayonets, or Fire at will.

In naval battles, players control a fleet of up to twenty varied ships and use 18th-century tactics to overcome enemy fleets. As with army units, each ship's crew has a set amount of morale that changes as a battle progresses; a crew may attempt to withdraw their vessel from the battle if their morale is broken, or in extreme cases may surrender. A battle is won when all hostile ships have been sunk, captured, or have left the map.

Individual ships can be manoeuvred, or remain in formation with other ships from the fleet. Players can designate which parts of a hostile ship they want a crew to target, making ships prone to sustaining authentic damage during a battle: masts can be toppled, sails and gun ports can be destroyed and damage can entirely disable a ship's ability to manoeuvre or eventually sink it. The types of ammunition that can be used during a battle are grapeshot, chain-shot and round shot, which have different uses, from killing enemy crew to disabling enemy movement. As battles progress, crews can try to board enemy vessels and fight hand-to-hand in an attempt to capture the ship. The weather in a naval battle is also important; bad weather can create poor visibility. Ships cannot be repaired in mid-battle, unlike its successor, Napoleon: Total War, but fires on board ships can be put out automatically.

== Development and marketing ==
=== Development ===
James Russell, the lead designer on the project, stated in an interview that the 18th century was chosen as the setting as "it's a fabulously colourful period... the 18th century is the great age of fighting sail, and it's the obvious arena in which to set our spectacular new sea battles." Russell also stated that the dynamic and far-reaching changes of the era, from political revolutions such as the French Revolution, economic revolutions such as the Industrial Revolution to military revolutions such as the widespread use of gunpowder, gave the "opportunity to develop some really interesting new features and gameplay dynamics that make for a lot of variation". Motion capture animation was used extensively to make characters seem more lifelike. For increased authenticity, research was conducted into 18th-century aspects such as duels, although designers also observed the choreography of actors in related films and TV series, such as Sharpe.

=== Marketing ===
Real-time naval battles are a major new addition to the Total War series. One designer spent a year working on the water's physics system.

Empire: Total War was announced by Creative Assembly and publisher Sega at the Leipzig Games Convention on 22 August 2007. In their press release, Creative Assembly outlined various features in the game, such as the new game engine and the addition of real-time naval combat. However, while the game had been in the planning stages since the release of Rome: Total War, it was still in early development; no gameplay footage was demonstrated at the convention. The game was announced alongside The Creative Assembly's console title Viking: Battle for Asgard.

Media releases over the subsequent months showed screenshots of the game and elaborated more on Empire: Total War's game mechanics. The game's trailer, consisting of computer-generated cut scene footage, was released 10 July 2008. A playable demonstration of the game's naval combat was showcased at the E3 convention later in July 2008, where it was estimated that the game would ship in 2009. The land combat was demonstrated at the later 2008 Leipzig Game Convention in August 2008. At the convention, Creative Assembly announced that the game was out of the alpha development phase, and that they were aiming for a release date of 6 February 2009.

The game's release was delayed in December 2008 to allow for the development of extended multiplayer features, with a new release date for March 2009. A demonstration of the game, featuring the Battle of Brandywine and the Battle of Lagos, was released over Steam on 20 February 2009. The game was released on 3 March 2009. Since release, Empire: Total War has been subject to updates delivered through the Steam system, aimed at optimising performance and removing any bugs remaining in the game.

Empire: Total War ships with nine different versions of box art, eight of which represent the major faction for the market the game is sold in, and one general international version. For instance, German customers are presented artwork displaying colours with the Prussian eagle and Prussian army uniforms, whilst the American artwork shows the American revolutionaries and the Betsy Ross flag. A special edition version of Empire: Total War entitled Special Forces incorporates six elite faction-specific units: HMS Victory, the French Irish Brigade, Spanish guerrillas, Gurkha infantry, Rogers' Rangers and the Ottoman Ribauldequin.

== Release ==
Empire: Total War was released on 3 March 2009 to the North American market, followed by a global launch on 4 March. The game has become the fastest selling Total War title to date; Empire topped British video game sales charts for all platforms in the week of release, the first PC exclusive title to do so in a year and a half. The game was reported to have sold nearly double the number of Rome: Total War and Medieval II: Total War. In the United States, Empire: Total War and its Special Forces edition were ranked as first and second respectively in the PC sales charts for the week of release. The game's Australian version debuted as the top PC game; across all platforms Empire: Total War was ranked fourth, behind Halo Wars, Wii Fit and Killzone 2. Sega reported the game sold 810,000 units worldwide during their last fiscal year period of 2008. However, consumer response was hampered by technical problems arising from incompatibility with certain Nvidia drivers released after the game's development was completed and reports of installation problems with the Steam content delivery system. In an interview with IGN, Studio Communications Manager Kieran Brigden discussed the problems inherent in developing such a huge and ambitious game, saying: "Are there some issues with Empire? Yes there are." As part of its post-release support, he said that Creative Assembly is planning on addressing issues with stability and performance, as well as adding improvements for gameplay and artificial intelligence.

Mike Simpson, Creative Assembly's studio director, started a blog in October 2009, in a deliberate attempt to engage with the game's user community and counter some of the negative reaction which the game had received. He explained The Creative Assembly "were not entirely happy with the state of Empire: Total War when it went out", but felt the Metacritic user rating of 67 per cent was unfair, stating that his reason for blogging was a concern that the negative ratings could even damage the amount of money available for developing future games. In later posts he described the February 2009 release date as "commercial reality", and explained why they had hit significant problems with the game's AI close to release. Simpson describes the campaign AI as "by far the most complex code edifice I’ve ever seen in a game", and said that they had reached a tipping point where consideration of too many factors led to an AI which "disagrees with itself chronically and often ends up paralysed by indecision". It was only after patch 1.5—six months after the original release—that Simpson felt comfortable sending it to friends of his, having previously been too embarrassed about the flaws. With regard to the battle AI, Simpson said that the lead battle AI programmer had left to return to his family just before the end of the project. The battle AI at that stage struggled to beat good players even with an obvious level of handicapping, and it had taken some time for other programmers to understand three years' worth of code; progress had been "frustratingly slow" as they strived for a game where real world tactics would work.

Feral Interactive released the game for OS X on 11 June 2014, for Linux on 9 December 2014, and for Android and iOS on 21 November 2024. In November 2018, Empire: Total War (along with Medieval II and Napoleon) was rebranded as Total War: Empire – Definitive Edition, making all downloadable content free alongside the core game, and thus giving access to players who already owned a copy.

=== Post-release content ===
Content was added to the game following launch. The developer added 14 units with the objective of increasing graphical and unit variety among the factions. These 14 units were released as part of the game's 1.3 patch in June 2009; accompanying the update was a second set of 14 units, released as downloadable content for purchase.

In September 2009, a DLC pack titled The Warpath Campaign was announced for release the following month, as was the next game in the series, Napoleon: Total War. The campaign, released as downloadable content, focuses on the battles of the Europeans and Native Americans throughout most of North and Central America. The new campaign expands the North American territories and features 5 new playable factions: Iroquois, Cherokee, Huron, Pueblo and Plains Nations. New researchable technologies were also added, along with the new scout and shaman agents and new faction-specific objectives.

Napoleon: Total War, released February 2010, focuses on the life of Napoleon Bonaparte, building upon the technology used for Empire: Total War. Napoleon was released as a standalone game rather than an expansion for a number of reasons, mostly to do with technical limitations; according to Mike Simpson "the level of detail required to successfully depict the Napoleonic Wars is an order of magnitude greater than we were working to with Empire: Total War".

== Reception ==
Reception

Aggregate score
Aggregator	Score
Metacritic	90/100

Review scores
Publication	Score
1Up.com	A−
Edge	9/10
Eurogamer	9/10
Game Informer	9.5/10
GamePro	3.5/5
GameRevolution	B
GameSpot	8.5/10
GameSpy	5/5
GameTrailers	8.6/10
GameZone	9/10
Giant Bomb	4/5
IGN	9.5/10
PC Gamer (UK)	94%

Empire: Total War received "universal acclaim" according to the review aggregation website Metacritic. Reviewers praised the large scope of the game's strategy map PC Gamer UK noted that the game "takes a great deal of its design philosophy from the events and trends of its era", which enabled the game to reasonably reflect the challenges faced by the factions' historical counterparts. Praise was also given to the extensive number of factions, down to very small factions such as the Knights of St. John and a renegade pirate settlement.

Kieron Gillen, reviewing for Eurogamer, described the campaign map as "endless" and due to the large amount of content, observed that he had managed to complete the entire campaign without even visiting the Indian theatre of play (approximately a full one fourth of the playable game world); a factor that enhanced the game's replayability. Other reviews echoed this sentiment; GameSpot stated that "even a short, 50-year campaign can take a good amount of time to complete, given that each turn requires strategic thinking on multiple fronts".

Praise was further bestowed on the refined interface, introduction of a technology tree and level of strategic thinking required for the campaign map. However, some reviewers noted inconsistent behaviour with the campaign artificial intelligence; 1UP.com noted that it could perform illogical choices, such as "the occasional suicidal war between Dagestan and Russia", while GamePro was critical of the artificial intelligence in a number of areas, including the inability to mount a naval invasion or use effective strategies on the campaign map.

The real-time land battles in Empire were considered well constructed. Expressing that The Creative Assembly had effectively implemented what it had learned since Shogun: Total War, GameSpy described the addition of personal firearms and friendly fire as something that "changes the tactical nature of the game much as it did in real life", and noting that the player controls and enemy AI were "competent". IGN felt that the real-time aspects captured "the cinematic brilliance of it all without ever falling back on obvious exaggerations or pretences" and that the controls, specifically in relation to unit formation, were much improved.

GameSpot put the real-time land battles as "enjoyable to command and enjoyable to watch", particularly commending the amount of detail in each model and animation for every soldier, points carried in several other reviews. However, GameSpot thought that the artificial intelligence could appear "confused" in some circumstances, and the Game Informer "second opinion" review said that "the enemy AI falls apart from time to time". In addition, Eurogamer felt that units' pathfinding abilities in fort sieges were insufficient, and Game Informer also criticised pathfinding around obstacles.

Naval combat was subject to more criticism than land battles. PC Format described the visuals in a naval battle as "incredible", but stated that the controls were "frustrating; genuine naval tactics fast disappear out of the window as [the player] struggles to bring [their] navy's cannons to bear on the enemy". PC Gamer UK reciprocated this view, but noted that naval strategy was a "deeply difficult task" for a developer, and that "The Creative Assembly have done the best that their game template would allow". IGN praised the graphical quality of the naval battles and stated that "trying to line ships up correctly, making the most of the wind and choosing targets appropriately is very rewarding", but that "the formations and pathfinding leave a lot to be desired". GameSpot commented that "the AI seems incapable of managing [a naval battle] with much success".

Despite criticisms, most reviews were ultimately favourable to Empire: Total War. While IGN felt that the game "drags a bit and there are some small, rough edges in the tactical battles", the game still "deserves to be mentioned in the same breath as the greatest names in gaming history". 1UP.com finished by saying "For all its problems, it's undoubtedly progress", while Eurogamer felt that issues "limit [the game] to being merely one of the games of the year," but implied that a post-release patch could deal with these flaws. GameSpot summarised that the game was "complex and rewarding" and GameSpy praised the game for "the simplified interface elements, great campaign, and much-improved map and information screens [that] make this the most accessible Total War yet, and a great place for those unfamiliar with the series to get started".

Crispy Gamer, while acclaiming the game "spectacular" and "lovingly historical", criticised the documentation and concluded that the game falls apart due to its bad AI. The Game Informer reviewers criticised the AI, but still described the overall game experience as "fantastic" and "outstanding". GamePro provided a dissenting opinion; although describing Empire: Total War as a game with a potential that "with some extra tweaking, could have proven itself an excellent title", noted that it "has a heap of problems that need resolving" with bugs and crashes. PC Gamer UK enthusiastically proclaimed the game as "one of the most playable, important and accomplished games ever created".

The downloadable content The Warpath Campaign was criticised by Game Watcher for not integrating into the original campaign and for only adding a few new units. Concerns were also voiced about the difficulty curve, though the reviewer felt the DLC provided players with a challenge by playing as the technologically backward Native Americans against the European interlopers.
