= Total Immersion Racing =

2002 racing game

- European cover art
- Developer: Razorworks
- Publishers: Empire Interactive, Feral Interactive (Mac)
- Composer: Richard Jacques
- Platforms: Windows; Macintosh; PlayStation 2 Xbox
- Release: PAL: November 1, 2002; NA: November 9, 2002 (PC); NA: November 18, 2002 (Xbox); NA: November 20, 2002 (PS2); Mac OS X: NA: December 18, 2003; EU: 2004
- Genre: Racing
- Modes: Single-player, multiplayer

Total Immersion Racing is a 2002 racing game that covers three types of car classes: GT, GTS and PRO (Prototype) and involves racing on both real-world and imaginary circuits. There are four difficulty levels: Amateur, Professional, Legend and Extreme.

Total Immersion Racing was released for the Mac OS X by Feral Interactive in 2003.

== Game modes ==
Single Race: Race on any unlocked track with any unlocked car. One lap to twenty-five can be raced and the time of day can be changed to either Evening or Day (on most tracks).

Career: Start in a low power GT car and rise through the ranks to win the PRO category championship and unlock cars and tracks.

Time Trial: Get best lap times on any track with any car.

Challenge: Complete thirty seven different challenges under five classes: GT, GTS, PRO, Manufacturer and Endurance. A list of all the challenges can be found below.

== Cars ==
There are a total of seventeen cars divided into three groups (GT, GTS and PRO (prototype)):

== Challenges ==
The challenges have to be completed in order, with completion of #1 unlocking #2 and so on. With each race the player accumulates points for their finishing position (10 for a win), which contribute to a championship score. Failure to win the championship will constitute failure of the challenge. The challenges may be one-car specific or may allow the choice of several or all cars from a single class. Completing challenges unlocks cars and tracks for use in single and multi-player as well a time trial use. Generally, 'manufacturer' challenges (where specific cars are unlocked) are separated by one or two general challenges (mostly allowing use of any unlocked car from the class of the previously unlocked vehicle). Winning races on tracks not previously raced on will unlock them, since not all tracks are available for racing from the start. Each challenges includes anywhere from 1 to 8 separate races, each of between 1 and 50 laps.

For challenge racing, there are no difficulty settings, with the difficulty ramping up as the player moves through them.

== Reception ==
Reception

Aggregate score
| Aggregator | Score | | | |
| Aggregator | Macintosh | PC | PS2 | Xbox |
|---|---|---|---|---|
| Metacritic | N/A | 66/100 | 59/100 | 60/100 |

Review scores
| Publication | Score | | | |
| Publication | Macintosh | PC | PS2 | Xbox |
|---|---|---|---|---|
| Computer Games Magazine | N/A | 2/5 | N/A | N/A |
| Game Informer | N/A | N/A | N/A | 6.5/10 |
| GameRevolution | N/A | N/A | C | N/A |
| GameSpot | N/A | 7.7/10 | 7.5/10 | 7.5/10 |
| GameSpy | N/A | N/A | 3/5 | N/A |
| GameZone | N/A | 6.5/10 | 7.9/10 | 7.5/10 |
| IGN | N/A | 7/10 | N/A | 5.8/10 |
| MacLife | 3/5 | N/A | N/A | N/A |
| Macworld | 4/5 | N/A | N/A | N/A |
| Official U.S. PlayStation Magazine | N/A | N/A | 1/5 | N/A |
| Official Xbox Magazine (US) | N/A | N/A | N/A | 3.5/10 |
| PC Gamer (US) | N/A | 60% | N/A | N/A |

The game received "mixed or average reviews" on all platforms according to the review aggregation website Metacritic.
