= Battle-Girl =

1997 video game

- Developer: Ultra/United Games (Note: Additional work on Macintosh version by Feral Interactive)
- Publisher: Power Media
- Designers: Andrew Campbell; Scott Laing
- Engine: TripTronic
- Platforms: Mac OS, Windows
- Release: Classic Mac OS: NA: September 24, 1997; Windows: NA: 1998
- Genre: Multidirectional shooter
- Mode: Single-player

Battle-Girl is a multidirectional shooter video game developed by Ultra/United Games and originally published in 1997 by Power Media for the Macintosh. In the game, players assume the role of the titular character taking control of her Soyuz 1183-A BattleCraft to save the Great Machine by eradicating malicious programmers released by Terminus, a weapon of Chaos. Its gameplay uses a two-joystick configuration reminiscent of Robotron: 2084.

Battle-Girl was designed over the course of almost two years by Scott Laing and Andrew Campbell, being influenced by arcade video games and Tempest 2000. The game was ported to Microsoft Windows in 1998. The Mac OS version was re-released by Feral Interactive in 1999, with the addition of a physical demo released by Green Dragon Creations and Monkey Byte Online. The title garnered positive reception from critics for its graphics, audio, and gameplay.

== Gameplay ==
Macintosh screenshot

Battle-Girl is a top-down multidirectional shooter. Players assume the role of the titular 15-year old character piloting her Soyuz 1183-A BattleCraft across more than 99 increasingly difficult stages to protect the Great Machine and its function pods by destroying malicious programmers by Terminus, a weapon built by terrorist organization Chaos as the main objective. Prior to starting a new game, players have the option to select a stage or change the difficulty level.

The game uses twin-stick shooter controls with support for other control peripherals. The left joystick controls the on-screen ship while the right controls the direction the ship's weapon fires. Each stage is a single screen populated with a large number of enemies and obstacles that are harmful to the ship. Players have to protect the four function pods from being rewritten by the programmers and failing to do so results with Terminus entering the stage to harm the ship. Succeeding in destroying Terminus grants bonus points after completing the stage, however, he nevertheless returns in the next stage. Players can also collect items like upgrades for the main weapon, secondary weapons and temporary power-ups.

== Development and release ==
Battle-Girl was developed by Ultra/United Games, a North American video game developer founded by Scott Laing in February 1996. Laing and Andrew Campbell co-designed the game over the course of a year and a half. The title makes use of a proprietary graphic engine created by Ultra/United Games dubbed "TripTronic", which enables smooth performance. In various interviews and the December 18, 1998 issue of online magazine Jaguar Explorer Online, the team described their project as a cross between games such as Tempest 2000, Sinistar, Robotron: 2084, Defender and the Virtual Light Machine, as Laing stated that Tempest 2000 was the title which got him back into video games and the most influential during the project's development due to the staff being fans of the Atari Jaguar.

Battle-Girl was first published for the Macintosh by Power Media in September 1997. In 1998, a Microsoft Windows version of the game was published by Feral Interactive. When asked by Jaguar Explorer Online editor Clay Halliwell about a potential conversion for the Jaguar, Laing stated that it would be possible but remarked on several technical issues for its realization. In April 1999, the original Mac OS version was re-released by Feral Interactive. In 2001, the title received a physical demo release by Green Dragon Creations and Monkey Byte Online. When asked about a potential OS X version or a solution to run the game properly on Classic Mac OS, Feral Interactive stated they do not have the rights to the title.

== Reception and legacy ==
Reception

Review scores
Publication	Score
Next Generation	(Mac OS) 4/5
Hot Games	(Windows) 4/5
MacAddict	(Mac OS) 4/5
Mac Gamer's Ledge	(Mac OS) 4.5/5.0
MacHome	(Mac OS) 4/5
Macworld	(Mac OS) 3.5/5

Battle-Girl was met with very positive reception from critics. Next Generation reviewed the Macintosh version of the game, rating it four stars out of five, and stated that "In a world where games like Tomb Raider or Super Mario 64 may take hours to finish even a single level, it's good to see titles like Battle-Girl keeping the hoary excuse 'videogames improve hand-eye coordination,' a believable one." Jaguar Explorer Online's Clay Halliwell regarded it to be "one of the best shoot-em-ups ever", saying that a conversion for the Atari Jaguar "would be perfect".

David Stephen of Feral Interactive regarded Bungie's Oni as a sister game to Battle-Girl with the same spirit, albeit in 3D. As of 2005, the official world record for Battle-Girl is held by Michael P. Minori from Los Angeles, California with 3,503,101 points.
