= Total War: Medieval III =

Upcoming strategy video game

- Developer: Creative Assembly
- Publisher: Sega
- Directors: Leif Walter; Pawel Wojs
- Series: Total War
- Platform: Windows
- Genres: Turn-based strategy, real-time tactics
- Modes: Single-player, multiplayer

Total War: Medieval III is an upcoming strategy video game in the Total War series, developed by Creative Assembly and published by Sega. As a successor to the 2006 Medieval II: Total War, the title was officially announced on 4 December 2025, alongside confirmation that the game will be built on the studio's new Warcore engine.

== Development ==
According to Roger Collum, the vice-president of the franchise, the team recognized strong fan demand for a sequel to Medieval II: Total War. While the team had made at least three attempts at greenlighting the game, they backed off developing it until the creation of Warcore, a new engine designed to modernise animation, rendering, and campaign systems. Medieval III was positioned by the team as a reboot for the historical Total War games.

Creative Assembly announced the game on 4 December 2025, stating that Medieval III aims to serve as a historically grounded sandbox set during the Middle Ages, allowing players to follow or diverge from historical events. According to game director Pawel Wojs, the title is in early pre-production and is expected to undergo a multi-year development cycle with periodic communication to the community.
