= Medieval II: Total War =

2006 video game

- Developers: Creative Assembly; Feral Interactive (ports)
- Publishers: Sega; Feral Interactive (ports)
- Director: Robert T. Smith
- Designer: Robert T. Smith
- Composers: Jeff van Dyck; Richard Vaughan; James Vincent
- Series: Total War
- Platforms: Microsoft Windows, macOS, Linux, Android, iOS
- Release: Microsoft Windows: EU: 10 November 2006; NA/AU: 13 November 2006; JP: 5 April 2007; MacOS, Linux: WW: 14 January 2016; Android, iOS: WW: 7 April 2022
- Genres: Real-time tactics, Turn-based strategy
- Modes: Single-player, multiplayer

Medieval II: Total War is a strategy video game developed by the since-disbanded Australian branch of The Creative Assembly and published by Sega. It was released for Microsoft Windows on 10 November 2006. Feral Interactive published versions of the game for macOS and Linux on 14 January 2016. It is the sequel to 2002's Medieval: Total War and the fourth title in the Total War series.

Gameplay is divided between a turn-based strategic campaign and real-time tactical battles. The campaign is set between the years 1080 and 1530. Players assume control of a medieval state, referred to in the game as a faction, and control its government, economy, military, diplomacy, and religion on a map spanning most of Europe, North Africa, parts of eastern Americas and the Middle East. In battles, players control groups of soldiers and engage in combat with enemy forces.

Medieval II received mostly positive reviews from critics. Many reviewers regarded the game as an improvement over its predecessors, but criticised its lack of innovation. An expansion pack, Medieval II: Total War: Kingdoms, was released in 2007.

A sequel, Total War: Medieval III, is currently in development.

== Gameplay ==
Similarly to previous titles in the Total War series, Medieval II: Total War consists of two main modes of play: a campaign mode and battles.

=== Campaign ===
The campaign, which is turn-based and starts in the 1080s, allows the player to play as one of seventeen factions (though through modifying the game files, all 23 factions are playable, if including the Normans and the Saxons) from the time period and build their nation economically and militarily in order to conquer other factions. Gameplay consists of controlling the faction's military, economic, and social systems in large campaign maps. During the player's turn, armies, fleets, and agents can be moved on the map. When an army engages another army, the player can choose to fight the battle personally in the battle mode, or automatically calculate the outcome.

The goal of the campaign depends on which type of campaign is played. The short campaign requires the player to defeat one or two enemy factions and control at least 15 settlements. The long campaign requires the player to control at least 45 territories and one or two significant cities, such as Jerusalem, Granada, Rome or Constantinople.

Territorial control in the campaign is represented by "settlements", which are large, notable communities. Unlike in previous Total War games, there are two different types of settlements: castles and cities. Cities primarily focus on buildings that boost one's economy, while castles primarily focus on buildings that allow for the recruitment of more advanced types of soldiers. Certain buildings in settlements can also allow the player to recruit agents that fulfill certain functions, like diplomats and spies. Under most circumstances, the settlements can be converted from one type to the other. Settlements can be governed by members of the player's family, who are also capable of leading armies as generals. The talents of family members (and other key characters) are affected by various statistics, like "Piety" and "Loyalty", which are in turn impacted by their character traits, personal experiences, and members of their personal retinue. For example, a character with a high "Command" stat can be expected to do better in battle than a character with a low stat.

Religion in the game is divided into three primary faiths: Roman Catholicism, Eastern Orthodoxy, and Islam. Unorganized pagan faiths and heretical sects are also represented. If a large portion of a settlement does not adhere to the state religion, unrest may ensue. Missionaries and religious buildings can be used to gradually convert members of other faiths to the state religion. Catholic nations must deal with the Pope, who can send special missions to Catholic rulers. Failure to obey the Pope may result in excommunication. The Pope may also call Crusades against hostile settlements. Muslim imams with a high "Piety" stat may similarly declare jihads.

Factions primarily interact with each other through diplomacy. Diplomatic actions include the creation of alliances, the securing of trade rights, and the giving or receiving of tribute. Factions may go to war with one another to secure more settlements or other concessions. Factions that are at war can use their armies to fight each other, which incorporates the battle mechanic of the game into the campaign. Several factions in the campaign are either not present or "dormant" when the game begins. The Mongols will invade in the early 13th century, often posing a serious threat to factions in their path. Later on in the late 14th century, the Timurids will invade, bringing war elephants with them. Late in the game, in the 15th century, factions may also sail to the Americas, where they can encounter the Aztecs.

Two significant events will also have a major impact on the game. First is the discovery of gunpowder in the 13th century, which gives access to cannons and matchlock firearms, significantly changing the battles and sieges. Second is the outbreak of the black plague, which sees outbreaks of plague throughout the map, having a significant effect on both armies and city populations.

Medieval II is known for its high intelligence for the AI factions and compared to most games in the franchise, their lack of "cheats" or special AI advantages. Although it is still possible to exploit the AI during battles.

=== Battles ===
A group of English knights attacking French dismounted feudal knights

One of the main focuses on the Total War franchise is its representation of real-time battles in addition to the turn-based campaign. A battle consists of two or more armies from different factions fighting each other. Battles play similarly to those in Rome: Total War, with formations of various kinds of troops engaging in combat. The objective of the battle is to defeat the enemy army by completely destroying it or causing the whole army to flee; in a siege battle, the objective is to completely destroy the army or to take control of a plaza in the centre of the settlement. There is also an option which allows the player to allow for time limits on battles, meaning that the attacker must defeat the defender within a certain time limit or the battle results in a victory for the defender. Battles can exist as custom battles set up by the player, multiplayer battles between humans, historical battles based on real-life military engagements, or battles that occur between factions in the campaign.

Unit categories include:

- Spear infantry: Typically lose against heavy infantry but are effective against cavalry. Can use formations such as schiltrom and phalanx.
- Light infantry: Cheap and mobile but not particularly effective unless flanking.
- Heavy infantry: Beat most other types of infantry at close range but struggle against cavalry. Particularly excel in siege battles, as spearmen cannot use their formations on top of walls. Many Heavy Infantry have high protective values and are valuable for holding most foes at place.
- Missile infantry: Effective at range but weak at close range. Firearm-equipped missile infantry also heavily damages enemy morale.
- Light cavalry: Not particularly effective in direct combat against other cavalry and most infantry but excel at scouting, chasing routed enemies, flanking attacks, and harassing ranged enemies.
- Heavy cavalry: Their charges can heavily damage infantry morale and a flanking charge is likely to completely break an infantry unit.
- Missile cavalry: Use ranged weapons from horseback and is most effective at skirmishing. Very effective against melee infantry, though typically lose in a shootout against missile infantry.
- Siege engines: Can be used both in sieges and as field artillery, though any army with siege engines moves much less per turn than one without them. Can also cause heavy morale damage, particularly if the siege weapons in question are cannons. Unlike in Rome: Total War, siege artillery can be moved through city gates and wall breaches.
- Vessels: Vessels can be used to transport ground units on the seas. The game has no naval battle mechanics however and naval battles can only be fought through auto-resolve.

Though some units are shared across different factions, some are unique to a certain faction and certain factions tend to specialize more in certain types of units. For example, England and Milan have some of the most effective missile infantry in the game thanks to the English longbowmen and Genoese crossbowmen respectively while France has some of the most effective heavy cavalry.

=== Factions ===
When first playing the game, the player can only choose out of five factions: Kingdom of England, Kingdom of France, Spain, Holy Roman Empire, and Republic of Venice. Defeating a faction allows the player to choose them on a later playthrough while completing a campaign allows the player to choose almost any of the factions in game. In addition to regular factions, various rebel groups roam the map and control most of the cities in the beginning of the game, allowing the player and computer-controlled factions to take these cities without committing to a war against a faction.

== Reception ==
Reception

Aggregate score
Aggregator	Score
Metacritic	PC: 88/100; IOS: 76/100

Review scores
Publication	Score
Eurogamer	9/10
GameRevolution	B+
GameSpot	8.8/10
GameSpy	4/5
IGN	(UK) 8.9/10 (US) 8.8/10
PC Gamer (US)	90%
TouchArcade	4.5/5

Medieval II: Total War received a "Gold" sales award from the Entertainment and Leisure Software Publishers Association (ELSPA), indicating sales of at least 200,000 copies in the United Kingdom.

Medieval II: Total War received "generally favorable reviews" according to the review aggregation website Metacritic.

The exclusive review was given to PC Gamer (US), which gave it an "Editor's Choice Award". IGN said that the game was not as revolutionary as its predecessor, but still introduces some new ideas and builds on others from Rome: Total War, which would still be enough for anybody to buy it. GameSpot noted the game's "epic, engrossing gameplay", but also criticised its "beefy system requirements". Hyper's Anthony Fordham commended the game for its "incredible gameplay, both in battle and on the world map." However, he criticised it for being "more a refinement of the series than a huge leap forward."

Swedish historian and member of the Swedish Academy Peter Englund reviewed the game for Swedish newspaper Dagens Nyheter where he made comparisons to traditional battle depictions such as old copper engravings and paintings, and the more recent film medium. In the review, Englund concluded that Medieval II represents a form of battle depiction "amazingly similar to an engraving from the 1600s."

The editors of Computer Games Magazine named Medieval II the eighth-best computer game of 2006. They wrote that "No scripted encounters or overly dramatic cutscenes can compare with the stories Creative Assembly allows you to write as your armies beat down all who would oppose you." Edge ranked the game at #26 on its list of "The 100 Best Games To Play Today", calling it "as complete a depiction of war as there has been in a videogame."

Although most reviews were positive, some reviews have noted negative aspects of the game, such as pathfinding bugs, some AI problems and some uninteresting new features.

The Academy of Interactive Arts & Sciences nominated Medieval II: Total War for "Strategy Game of the Year" at the 10th Annual Interactive Achievement Awards.

== Expansion ==
An expansion, Medieval II: Total War: Kingdoms, was announced on 30 March 2007 and released on 28 August 2007 in the US, 31 August in the UK, 7 September in Australia, and 22 November in Japan. It adds four new campaigns to the game: "Americas", which focuses on the Spanish colonization of the Americas, "Britannia", which focuses on several conflicts on the British Isles, "Crusades", which covers the Third and Fourth Crusades, and "Teutonic", which deals with the Northern Crusades. In each of the campaigns, a small part of the world (e.g. the British Isles) is taken and enlarged, with many settlements added to it.

The Gold Edition of the game, containing the original game and the expansion pack, was released on 1 February 2008; this was later released/renamed on Steam as Medieval II: Total War™ Collection.

== Sequel ==
A sequel to Medieval II: Total War was announced on 4 December 2025 by Creative Assembly. Total War: Medieval III, which will be built on the studios new Warcore engine. The title is in early pre-production and is expected to undergo a multi-year development cycle with periodic communication to the community.
