= Napoleon: Total War =

2010 video game

- Developers: Creative Assembly; Feral Interactive (OS X)
- Publishers: Sega; Feral Interactive (OS X)
- Designer: Ian Roxburgh
- Composers: Richard Beddow; Ian Livingstone
- Series: Total War
- Platforms: Microsoft Windows, OS X, Android, iOS
- Release: Windows: NA: 23 February 2010; EU: 26 February 2010; OS X: WW: 3 July 2013; Android, iOS: WW: 2 December 2025
- Genres: Turn-based strategy, real-time tactics
- Modes: Single-player, multiplayer

Napoleon: Total War is a turn-based strategy and real-time tactics video game developed by Creative Assembly and published by Sega for the Microsoft Windows and macOS. Napoleon was released in North America on 23 February 2010, and in Europe on 26 February. The game is the sixth stand-alone installment in the Total War series. The game is set in Europe, North Africa, and the Middle East during the French Revolutionary Wars and Napoleonic Wars. Players assume the role of Napoleon Bonaparte, or one of his major rivals, on a turn-based campaign map and engage in the subsequent battles in real-time. As with its predecessor, Empire: Total War, which included a special United States storyline, Napoleon features three special campaigns that follow the general's career.

Napoleon received generally favourable reviews from video game critics. Reviews praised the game's visuals, story driven campaigns, and new gameplay features. Some reviewers were critical of the game's weak AI, high system requirements, and its limited scope – while others considered Napoleon overly similar to Empire, its immediate predecessor in the series.

An entirely new campaign, the Peninsular Campaign, was released 25 June 2010 as downloadable content. It was later released in retail as part of the Empire and Napoleon Total War – Game of the Year Edition compilation pack on 2 October 2010.

The OS X version of the game, containing the Peninsular Campaign and additional unit packs, was announced by Feral Interactive on 28 January 2013. It was released on 3 July 2013.

French actor Stéphane Cornicard provided voice-acting for Napoleon Bonaparte in the original English, German, French, and Spanish editions.

Feral Interactive announced that a mobile version of Napoleon: Total War will release on December 2, 2025, for Android and iOS devices.

== Gameplay ==
As with all other games in the Total War series, Napoleon consists of two gameplay types: a turn-based geopolitical campaign – which requires players to build structures in a faction's territories to produce units and create a source of income, research new technologies, deal with other in-game factions through diplomacy, trade and war, send agents on missions, create and command armies, and eventually become the world's dominant faction – and real-time tactical battles where players command huge armies to direct the course of any battles that take place.

The game tutorial modes feature a walkthrough of Napoleon's younger years, as well as presenting the Siege of Toulon and the first Battle of Algeciras. Napoleon contains four campaigns, two of which follow Napoleon's early military career. The first career event is the Italian campaign of 1796–1797, while the second is the French invasion of Egypt in 1798. Both feature smaller, optional missions that help drive the story forward. The major French campaign, however, is the so-called "Mastery of Europe," which resembles the holistic modes of previous Total War games. Conversely, the "Campaigns of the Coalition" allows players to govern Great Britain, Russia, Prussia, or Austria and attempt to defeat Napoleonic France in Europe. Each major campaign requires players to obtain a certain number of territories, although unlike Empire: Total War, one does not need to wait till the end of the campaign to be declared winner. Like in Empire, revolutions and revolts can affect the course of a player's campaign; France however in the Mastery of Europe campaign is all but immune to revolution. For the first time in the Total War franchise, attrition now plays a part on the campaign map. Depending on the location, armies will lose men due to heat or snow. Unlike Empire, the losses an army has on campaign are automatically replenished when in friendly territory. Some of Napoleon's most famous battles such as the Battle of the Pyramids, Austerlitz, Borodino, and Waterloo are available as historical scenarios, separate from the campaign. The following battles of the Napoleonic era can also be played: Lodi, Arcole, the Nile, Trafalgar, Dresden, and Ligny.

As with previous Total War games, battles can be fought manually or auto resolved when two hostile armies or navies meet on the campaign map. Armies and navies consist of Napoleonic era land units and ships respectively. On the battle map, the attacker will win if he manages to rout the entire enemy army while the defender wins if he manages to rout the attacker or have at least one unit remaining when the time limit runs out. Similar somewhat to Empire, land units are armed with gunpowder weapons such as muskets and cannons and melee weapons like swords, sabers and bayonets. Units have morale that will fall if massive casualties are incurred, if they are flanked, the general is killed and several other factors. Once a unit's morale is broken, it will rout and attempt to escape the battlefield. Broken units may regain morale if the balance of power changes, so to ensure these units will not remain a threat, players ought to chase them down with light cavalry. Infantry units may engage in both firefights and melees, cavalry can generally only fight in a melee with the exception of mounted infantry and missile cavalry while artillery units are best used to hit targets from afar. Creative Assembly also implemented a feature wherein while playing a campaign each faction has a notable commander, who by default has high traits that strengthen the army, and who cannot die by game conditions, but only be wounded and sent back to the faction's main capital: France has Napoleon himself, Austria has Archduke Charles, Great Britain has the Duke of Wellington, Prussia has Gebhard von Blücher, and Russia has Mikhail Kutuzov.

A new physics system had been implemented for the real-time battles, so that when cannonballs hit the ground, for instance, they leave impact craters. Gunpowder smoke lingers and reduces visibility in protracted engagements. Mike Simpson, Creative Assembly's studio director, reported that there are a number of environmental factors that affect battlefield tactics: gunpowder backfires when it rains, and the elevation of landscape affects the range of munitions. Individuals within a unit now vary to a greater degree, and are no longer as generic as in previous titles in the series. The campaign map is narrower in focus, but more detailed than Empire's campaign map. Turns in Napoleon: Total War represent two weeks, while previous titles sported turns that were the equivalent of at least six months. Additionally the game's artificial intelligence system had been modified. There was also a new uniform system that includes approximately 355 non-editable uniforms that has so far never been released, casting a doubt of its creation.

In addition, Napoleon: Total War contains several new multiplayer features and a voice command utility to speak to other players via Steam. Unlike previous Total War titles, there is now the option for a "drop-in" multiplayer campaign mode: when playing a campaign against the computer, it is possible to allow another user to join via a lobby and take control.

=== Multiplayer ===
The multiplayer mode has a campaign mode. Multiplayer drop-in battles allows to fight human opponents in the single player campaign battles. Steam achievements, game play bonuses and voice communications are also available.

== Marketing and release ==
Napoleon: Total War was first revealed on 19 August 2009. The game was meant to be the first in an all-new story driven branch of the Total War series. On 10 March 2010, a demo was released via Steam featuring a playable version of the Battle of Ligny.

=== Retail versions ===
| Features | Standard | Limited | Imperial | Emperor's |
|---|---|---|---|---|
| Game disc and manual | Yes | Yes | Yes | Yes |
| Elite Regiment unit pack | Yes | Yes | Yes | Yes |
| Heroes of the Napoleonic Wars unit pack | No | Yes | Yes | Yes |
| Collector's packaging | No | No | Yes | Yes |
| Illustrated A3 wallchart poster | No | No | Yes | Yes |
| Napoleon’s Field Journal | No | No | No | Yes |
| 8” Statuette of Napoleon | No | No | No | Yes |

Napoleon was initially released in four different retail versions: Standard edition, Limited edition, Imperial edition, and the Emperor's edition. All boxed versions include the "Elite Regiment" pack, a collection of five extra units; any edition bought on Steam does not include this unit pack.

- Standard – comes with only the game disc and manual in a standard plastic case like most other retail game editions.
- Limited – offers the full game and manual, as well as ten exclusive units in the "Heroes of the Napoleonic Wars" pack.
- Imperial – includes all the contents of the Limited Edition, but has special premium packaging and an illustrated wallchart timeline of the important events in Napoleon's life.
- Emperor's – includes all contents of the Imperial Edition, and is the only edition to include a 200mm statuette of Napoleon and a field journal. This edition was released only in Australia and New Zealand.
- Empire and Napoleon Total War – Game of the Year Edition – this version contains the full versions of both Empire and Napoleon, including most of their available downloadable content (excluding "Heroes of the Napoleonic Wars" and the "Imperial Eagle Pack" for the latter).

Pre-orders made via the Steam content delivery system included another special unit: the Royal Scots Greys. Orders made via certain retailers likewise included various special units: HMS Elephant, Towarczys, and the Grand Battery of the Convention

=== Downloadable content ===
The first downloadable content for Napoleon, the Imperial Guard Pack, was released on 26 March 2010 for free. It added to the game several new units such as Napoleon's Polish Guard Lancers and an alternate version of the Battle of Waterloo scenario, with the British as the playable faction. Creative Assembly released the Coalition Battle Pack on 6 May 2010. It contains six new units: Lifeguard Hussars, Coldstream Guards, Archduke Charles' Legion, Luetzow's Freikorps, Life Hussars, and the Semenovski Lifeguard. Additionally, it also includes a scenario featuring the Battle of Friedland.

A downloadable campaign, The Peninsular Campaign, was announced on 25 May 2010. It was eventually released on 25 June 2010 via Steam. Featuring an enlarged map of the Iberian Peninsula, new units (such as guerrilla units that can be placed outside a player's deployment zone before a battle), agents, technologies, and gameplay mechanics, this new campaign, as its name implies, focuses on the Peninsular War.

One of the features advertised for Napoleon was a uniform editor. Upon release Creative Assembly announced that the uniform editor would be delayed; while it was not advertised "on the box", it was advertised as a feature by all online retailers (including Steam) and the official game website. Five months after Napoleon: Total War's release, mention of the uniform editor was removed from the game's list of features on its official website; it is, however, still being advertised on most online retailers selling the game. Almost eight months after the game's release, Mike Simpson stated that the original uniform editor was never meant for public use, and that Creative Assembly was making a unit editor capable of both editing and creating new units. This new unit editor was scheduled to be released in the first quarter of 2011.

== Reception ==
Reception

Aggregate score
| Aggregator | Score |
|---|---|
| Metacritic | 81/100 |

Review scores
| Publication | Score |
|---|---|
| 1Up.com | B |
| Computer and Video Games | 9.1/10 |
| Eurogamer | 8/10 |
| GameSpot | 8.5/10 |
| GameSpy | 2/5 |
| IGN | 8.9/10 |
| PC Gamer (UK) | 82/100 |
| Gameplanet | 9/10 |
| The Guardian | 4/5 |

Napoleon: Total War received "generally favorable" reviews, according to review aggregator website Metacritic. The game and its developers alike were praised for a number of graphical and AI improvements, along with the new campaign features and multiplayer modes.

IGN remarked that the "tactical battles are still some of the most amazing we've ever seen in any game." Gameplanet came to the same conclusion, stating that "graphically, the battles leave Empire in the dust, featuring five times more particles per effect." GameSpot praised the interface, saying that "[it] never feels cluttered, and the bulk of the screen is always devoted to the action."

Other aspects of the game received a mixed reaction. According to Eurogamer, despite occasionally poor decision-making "the AI will still hold its own," and provides players "with a challenge that suits the difficulty." Other criticisms focused upon the somewhat linear story-mode campaigns, the duration of naval engagements and the stability of the game's Netcode. Actiontrip commented that "while still a good strategy game, Napoleon: Total War seems to offer less freedom to players in terms of how they can resolve various battle situations." Tom Chick, in his GameSpy review, gave the game a 2.0 out of 5, citing "Bad AI" and the game "feel[ing] like a re-skinned Empire" for the score. Game Revolution felt the same, noting that "the problem Napoleon has is that it's not just like Empire, it is and only is Empire...It feels like an expansion at best, yet it's being sold like it's a brand new game."

The game was awarded Best PC Game at Milthon European Game Awards in Paris on 22 September 2010.

Score composers Richard Beddow, Richard Birdsall and Ian Livingstone won the British Ivor Novello Award for Best Original Video Game Score on 19 May 2011.
