= Feral Interactive =

British video game publisher

Feral Interactive Limited
- Type: Private
- Industry: Video games
- Founded: 1996; 30 years ago
- Headquarters: London, England
- Key people: David Stephen; Ian Bullock; Edwin Smith; Andrew Wood
- Number of employees: 100–150
- Website: feralinteractive.com

Feral Interactive Limited is a British video games developer and publisher for macOS, Linux, iOS, Android, Nintendo Switch, Meta Quest and Microsoft Windows platforms. It was founded in 1996 to bring games to Mac and specialises in porting games to different platforms.

Feral have partnered with publishers like Square Enix Europe, 2K Games, Sega Europe, Warner Bros. Interactive Entertainment and Codemasters to port and publish their games for platforms that the publishers themselves are not supporting. It has offered its games on digital download services like Direct2Drive since 2011.

== History ==
From 1996 to 2013, Feral Interactive published games exclusively for macOS. In June 2014, Feral released its first game for Linux, XCOM: Enemy Unknown. In 2016, Feral launched multiplayer service Calico for its games. In November 2016, Feral released its first game for iOS, Rome: Total War for iPad, following in November 2017 with its first iOS release simultaneously for both iPhone and iPad, GRID Autosport. Due to Apple Inc. discontinuation of support for 32-bit applications, 19 Mac games became unavailable. Feral's first Android release, Rome: Total War, came in December 2018. Feral Interactive released its first Nintendo Switch title, GRID Autosport, in September 2019. Feral developed the remaster of Rome: Total War in collaboration with Creative Assembly, released in April 2021, which is its first game for Windows. In July 2021 it cancelled its upcoming Linux port of Total War Saga: Troy citing lack of demand due to the availability of Proton, and although it released a port of Total War: Warhammer III in 2022, it also confirmed none is planned for Total War: Pharaoh. It had previously declined to adapt its ports to support the Steam Deck.

== Awards ==
In 2006, the Mac version of The Movies won a BAFTA Award for the best game in the Simulation category. In 2012, the Mac version of Deus Ex: Human Revolution won a 2012 Apple Design Award as part of the Mac Developer Showcase.

== Games ==
Year	Title	Platform	Original publisher	Ref.
1997	Racing Days R; Battle-Girl	MacOS		
1999	Championship Manager 3; Championship Manager: Season 99/00	MacOS		
2000	Championship Manager: Season 00/01; Theme Park World	MacOS		
2001	Championship Manager: Season 01/02; Oni; Sheep; Tropico	MacOS		
2002	Black & White Platinum Pack; Black & White: Creature Isle; Enemy Engaged: RAH-66 Comanche vs. KA-52 Hokum; F1 Championship Season 2000; Max Payne; Zoombinis Island Odyssey	MacOS		
2003	Championship Manager 4; Championship Manager: Season 03/04; Ghost Master; Total Immersion Racing; Warrior Kings; Worms Blast; Worms 3D	MacOS		
2004	Chessmaster 9000; Ford Racing 2; Rayman 3: Hoodlum Havoc; Republic: The Revolution; XIII	MacOS		
2005	Bionicle; Commandos 2: Men of Courage; Commandos 3: Destination Berlin	MacOS		
2006	Imperial Glory; The Movies: Superstar Edition	MacOS		
2007	Colin McRae Rally Mac; Lego Star Wars II: The Original Trilogy	MacOS		
2008	Battlestations: Midway; Fable: The Lost Chapters; Lego Indiana Jones: The Original Adventures; TOCA Race Driver 3; Sid Meier's Pirates!; The Movies: Stunts and Effects; Tomb Raider: Anniversary	MacOS		
2009	BioShock; Black & White 2; Lego Batman: The Videogame	MacOS		
2010	Battlestations: Pacific; Borderlands: Game of the Year Edition; Brothers in Arms: Double Time; Lego Star Wars: The Complete Saga; Mini Ninjas; Rome: Total War - Gold Edition	MacOS		
2011	Batman: Arkham Asylum; Colin McRae: Dirt 2; Lego Harry Potter: Years 1–4; Lego Indiana Jones 2: The Adventure Continues; Lego Star Wars III: The Clone Wars; Mafia II: Director's Cut; Puzzler World	MacOS		
2012	Batman: Arkham City - Game of the Year Edition; Deus Ex: Human Revolution - Ultimate Edition; Empire: Total War - Gold Edition; F1 2012; Lego Batman 2: DC Super Heroes; Lego Harry Potter: Years 5–7; Sid Meier's Railroads!; Tomb Raider: Underworld; Tropico 3: Gold Edition	MacOS		
2013	Lego The Lord of the Rings; Napoleon: Total War - Gold Edition; Race Driver: Grid; Rayman Origins; Sega Superstars Tennis; Sonic & Sega All-Stars Racing; The Lord of the Rings: War in the North; Tropico 4: Gold Edition; XCOM: Enemy Unknown - Elite Edition	MacOS		
2014	Empire: Total War Collection; XCOM: Enemy Unknown - The Complete Edition	MacOS, Linux		
2014	Castle of Illusion Starring Mickey Mouse; Colin McRae Rally; Deus Ex: Human Revolution - Director's Cut; F1 2013; Grid 2 Reloaded Edition; Hitman: Absolution — Elite Edition; Lego Batman 3: Beyond Gotham; Lego Marvel Super Heroes; Lego The Hobbit; Rome: Total War - Alexander; The Lego Movie Videogame; Tomb Raider; Total War: Shogun 2 Collection; Total War: Shogun 2 - Fall of the Samurai Collection; Tropico 4: Gold Edition - State of Emergency	MacOS		
2015	Alien: Isolation; Company of Heroes 2; Grid Autosport; Middle-earth: Shadow of Mordor	MacOS, Linux		
2015	Dirt 3 Complete Edition; Lego Jurassic World; Thief	MacOS		
2016	Life Is Strange; Mad Max; Medieval II: Total War; Warhammer 40,000: Dawn of War II; Warhammer 40,000: Dawn of War II – Chaos Rising; Warhammer 40,000: Dawn of War II – Retribution; XCOM 2	MacOS, Linux		
2016	Lego Marvel's Avengers; Lego Star Wars: The Force Awakens; Sleeping Dogs: Definitive Edition	MacOS		
2016	Deus Ex: Mankind Divided; F1 2015; Tomb Raider; Total War: Warhammer	Linux		
2016	Rome: Total War	iPadOS		
2017	Dirt Rally; F1 2017; Hitman; Warhammer 40,000: Dawn of War III; XCOM 2: War of the Chosen	MacOS, Linux		
2017	BioShock Remastered; Deus Ex: Mankind Divided; F1 2016; Total War: Warhammer	MacOS		
2017	Total War: Shogun 2 Collection; Total War: Shogun 2 - Fall of the Samurai Collection	Linux		
2017	Grid Autosport	iOS		
2017	Rome: Total War: Alexander; Rome: Total War: Barbarian Invasion	iPadOS		
2018	Life Is Strange: Before the Storm; Rise of the Tomb Raider; Total War Saga: Thrones of Britannia; Total War: Warhammer II	MacOS, Linux		
2018	Rome: Total War	iOS, Android		
2018	Lego Marvel Super Heroes 2; Lego The Incredibles	MacOS		
2018	Tropico	iPadOS		
2019	Dirt 4; Life Is Strange 2; Shadow of the Tomb Raider; Total War: Three Kingdoms	MacOS, Linux		
2019	Grid Autosport	Android, Nintendo Switch		
2019	Rome: Total War: Alexander; Rome: Total War: Barbarian Invasion; Tropico	iOS, Android		
2019	Lego DC Super-Villains; The Lego Movie 2 Videogame	MacOS		
2019	Alien: Isolation	Nintendo Switch		
2020	Company of Heroes	iOS, Android		
2020	BioShock 2	MacOS		
2020	XCOM 2 Collection	iOS		
2021	Total War: Rome REMASTERED	MacOS, Linux, Microsoft Windows		
2021	Alien: Isolation	iOS, Android		
2021	XCOM 2 Collection	Android		
2022	Medieval II: Total War	iOS, Android		
2023	Hitman: Blood Money - Reprisal	iOS, Android		
2023	Lara Croft and the Guardian of Light; Lara Croft and the Temple of Osiris	Nintendo Switch		
	Grid Legends	macOS		
2024	Empire: Total War	iOS, Android		
2024	Hitman: Blood Money - Reprisal	Nintendo Switch		
2024	Tropico	Meta Quest		
2025	Napoleon: Total War	iOS, Android		
2025	Hitman: Absolution	iOS, Android, Nintendo Switch		
2026	Hitman: Absolution	Nintendo Switch 2		
TBA	Screen Studio; Who Wants to Be a Millionaire	MacOS		
