= Rome: Total War: Barbarian Invasion =

2005 video game

Rome Total War: Barbarian Invasion
- Developer: Creative Assembly (Note: Remaster and ports were developed by Feral Interactive.)
- Publishers: Sega; Feral Interactive (iOS, Droid)
- Director: Michael M. Simpson
- Designers: Robert T. Smith; Mike Brunton; Jamie Ferguson; Chris Gambold; James Russell
- Composer: Jeff van Dyck
- Series: Total War
- Platforms: Windows, iOS, Android, Linux, macOS
- Release: 27 September 2005: Windows; NA: 27 September 2005; EU: 30 September 2005; AU: 21 October 2005 iOS; WW: 28 March 2017 Android; WW: 18 June 2019 Linux, macOS; WW: 29 April 2021
- Genres: Real-time tactics, turn-based strategy
- Modes: Single player, multiplayer

Rome: Total War: Barbarian Invasion is the first expansion pack for the strategy video game Rome: Total War. The expansion was released in 2005 in North America and Europe and in 2006 in Japan for Windows. Feral Interactive released the iPad version on 28 March 2017, the iPhone version on 9 May 2019, and an Android version of the game on 18 June 2019. A remastered version of the game was released as part of Total War: Rome Remastered on 29 April 2021. While the main game deals with the rise of the Roman Empire, Barbarian Invasion covers the decline and fall of the Western Roman Empire during the Migration Period.

A game covering the same time period, Total War: Attila, would later be released in 2015.

== Gameplay ==
As Barbarian Invasion takes place several centuries after the end of the original game, the factions and provinces are very different. While the original Rome: Total War focused on the rise of Rome, Barbarian Invasion focuses on the decline of Western Rome during the Migration Period, as numerous Germanic and Asiatic tribes, such as the Huns, the Franks, and the Goths, migrate into Roman lands and the religion of Christianity begins to replace Roman paganism. Meanwhile, Eastern Rome struggles more with the Zoroastrians of Sassanid Persia than they do with the "barbarian" tribes. Several new gameplay features were added to reflect the tumultuousness of the era, while most of the fundamental gameplay mechanics are the same as they were in the original game.

In Barbarian Invasion, most barbarians are able to transform their faction into a "horde". When a barbarian faction loses its last province, rather than being destroyed, it becomes a horde and is forced to settle elsewhere (two factions, the Huns and Vandals, begin with no provinces, while other factions can appear later in the game as hordes). Barbarian factions with only one province may also choose to voluntarily abandon their province and become a horde. Hordes are very large armies that represent an entire faction, but they do not require upkeep. When a horde army successfully seizes a city, it is given the option of sacking the city (which does massive damage to the population and buildings of a city and gives the horde a large amount of money) or of settling in the city, which allows the horde to begin anew, with the new city as its capital; the faction is then able to conquer other provinces normally. When the horde settles, a portion of the horde army is disbanded and the population distributed into the city. Horde factions do not "die out" unless they are totally defeated on the battlefield and/or their major family members are all slain.

Barbarian Invasion also introduces the concept of religion. The three religions represented in the game are paganism, Christianity, and Zoroastrianism. Characters in the game may adhere to one of the three religions, and the religious composition of each province is also stated. Provinces may gradually convert to a different religion in a variety of ways; for example, constructing temples dedicated to one of the religions will help that religion spread in the province. Religious conflict within a province will usually cause a great deal of unrest, which may force the player to either take steps to make the province happier or try to convert the province in order to avoid a revolt.

== Reception ==
Reception

Aggregate score
Aggregator	Score
Metacritic	82/100

Review scores
Publication	Score
Eurogamer	8/10
GameRevolution	B
GameSpot	8.2/10
GameSpy	4/5
IGN	8.8/10
PC Format	88%
PC Gamer (US)	86%

The expansion received "favorable" reviews according to the review aggregation website Metacritic. Many reviewers expressed disappointment with the small number of new features that the expansion introduced. However, most concluded that they still enjoyed the expansion despite the lack of innovation.

Barbarian Invasion received a "Silver" sales award from the Entertainment and Leisure Software Publishers Association (ELSPA), indicating sales of at least 100,000 copies in the United Kingdom.
