= Rome: Total War =

2004 video game

- Developer: Creative Assembly (Note: Ports and remastered version by Feral Interactive.)
- Publishers: Activision (original); Sega (current); Feral Interactive (Mac OS X, iOS, Android)
- Director: Michael M. Simpson
- Designers: Robert T. Smith; Mike Brunton; Michael de Plater; Jamie Ferguson; Chris Gambold
- Composer: Jeff van Dyck
- Series: Total War
- Platforms: Windows; Mac OS X; iOS; Android; Linux; macOS
- Release: September 22, 2004: Windows; NA: September 22, 2004; AU: September 24, 2004; EU: October 1, 2004; Mac OS X; WW: February 5, 2010; iOS; WW: November 10, 2016; Android; WW: December 19, 2018; Linux, macOS; WW: April 29, 2021
- Genres: Real-time tactics, turn-based strategy
- Modes: Single-player, multiplayer

Rome: Total War is a strategy video game developed by The Creative Assembly and originally published by Activision; its publishing rights have since passed to Sega. The game was released for Microsoft Windows in 2004. The Mac OS X version was released on February 5, 2010, by Feral Interactive, who also released the iPad version on November 10, 2016, the iPhone version on August 23, 2018, and the Android version on December 19, 2018. The game is the third title in The Creative Assembly's Total War series, following Shogun: Total War, and Medieval: Total War.

The game's main campaign takes place from 270 BC to 14 AD, showcasing the rise and final centuries of the Republican period and the early decades of the imperial period of Ancient Rome. Gameplay is split between real-time tactical battles and a turn-based strategic campaign. Within the campaign, players manage the economy, government, diplomacy, and military of their faction and attempt to accomplish a series of objectives on a map that encompasses most of Europe, North Africa, and the Near East. On the battlefield, the player controls groups of soldiers and uses them to engage in combat with enemy forces.

Upon its release, Rome: Total War received widespread acclaim from critics. In the years since, the game has frequently been referred to by critics as one of the greatest games of all time. Two official expansion packs, Barbarian Invasion and Alexander, were released for the game. A sequel, Total War: Rome II, was released on September 3, 2013. A remastered version of the game, developed by Feral Interactive, was released on April 29, 2021.

== Gameplay ==
As with previous games in the Total War series, Rome: Total War has two primary modes of play: a turn-based, single-player campaign that takes place on an overhead map of the world and a real-time battle system that occurs on 3D battlefields.

A Julii family member governing a settlement. His character traits and retinue can be seen beneath his portrait, while his fundamental stats are to the right of his portrait. Further down is a list of the troops that can be trained in the city that he is governing. To the left, the campaign map can be seen; the character is governing Arretium. A diplomat can be seen outside the city. To the north, a Julii army is besieging the Gallic city of Mediolanum.

Control over territory in the game is represented by capturing and holding a settlement in that territory. New cities are conquered by either training soldiers in cities that are already in the player's control and then using those soldiers to besiege enemy cities or by bribing the city into switching sides. Apart from simply expanding one's faction, cities can have positive or negative effects on a nation. For example, well-managed cities can provide the faction that control them with valuable tax income, but poorly managed cities may cost the player more money in maintenance than they make in taxes. Cities have a variety of buildings that may be built or upgraded, such as temples, barracks, and amphitheatres. Buildings have different effects on the city; for example, aqueducts improve public health and decrease urban squalor, which in turn makes the inhabitants of the city happier. If cities grow too unhappy, they may revolt and either return to a faction that previously controlled them or become a part of a generic "rebel" faction.

Each faction starts with a set of family members. The head of the family is the leader of the faction; any male above the age of 16 can be designated as the current leader's heir. Males above the age of 16 can govern settlements and command armies as generals. Male family members can be added through births between married family members, adoption, or marriage with a female family member. Family members eventually die; natural causes, battles, assassinations, diseases, and natural disasters can all cause a character's demise. Family members can develop character traits from life experiences or heredity. These traits can have both positive and negative effects on the character's stats, which in turn affect their battlefield performance, how well they manage their settlements, and how persuasive they are in negotiations. The stats of family members can also be affected by members of their personal retinue.

Agents are special types of characters that can be recruited in cities with the proper buildings. Agents can also acquire traits and retinue members. There are three types of agents: spies, diplomats, and assassins. Spies can be used to gather intelligence about the composition of armies, infiltrate foreign cities, and serve in a counter-espionage role in the players own cities. When besieging an enemy city, spies stationed within that city have a chance to open the gates. Assassins can assassinate characters and commit sabotage in settlements. Spies and assassins can both be killed during their missions. Diplomats can offer a variety of diplomatic deals to other factions, such as alliances, tributes, and trade rights. They may also attempt to bribe foreign armies, cities, agents, and family members into either defecting or, if the soldiers being bribed are not "compatible" with the other faction, deserting.

=== Battles ===
An example of a battle in progress. Here, a group of hoplites are utilizing the phalanx formation to better defend themselves at the cost of decreased mobility.

In addition to the turn-based campaign, Rome: Total War also features 3D, real-time battles. Battles can be played as a part of the larger campaign, as a custom battle against the AI, as a preset "historical battle" based on a real-life military engagement, or as a multiplayer battle against other players. As opposed to the campaign, which features an overhead map of the world, battles take place on individual battlefields. The terrain of the battlefield can play a key role in how the battle plays out. In most cases, the ultimate goal of the battle is to defeat the enemy forces by either killing or routing all of their troops; in a siege, the attacker can also achieve victory by capturing and holding the town center for a period of time. In battles, the player commands a variety of soldiers that are arranged into units. The game features a variety of units for battle, which may be broadly categorised into infantry, cavalry, archers, and siege weapons. Different units have different morale, hit points, and general combat skills. If a unit's morale drops too low, its soldiers try to flee the field. Units can create different formations that alter how they perform in combat; for example, many spearmen units can form the phalanx formation, while many Roman units can form the testudo. Both of these formations sacrifice mobility in favour of defensiveness. The player can also employ complex tactics to help them achieve victory; for example, soldiers can ambush enemies from a nearby forest or flank them to avoid a frontal engagement.

== Expansions ==
=== Barbarian Invasion ===
Barbarian Invasion allows the player to take control of the barbarian nations of Europe and the Middle East during the migration period. It also adds a more complex portrayal of religion, with changes in the state religion affecting unrest and the popularity of the ruling family. The campaign takes place from 363 AD to 476 AD.

=== Alexander ===
The Alexander expansion puts the player in the role of Alexander the Great and replays his conquests and battles. The campaign takes place from 336 BC to 323 BC.

== Development ==
A demo featuring a playable version of the Battle of River Trebia, with the player taking the role of the general Hannibal, was released on August 23, 2004, and is freely available for download.

Prior to release, a preliminary version of the game engine was used in two series of TV programs: Decisive Battles by the History Channel, where it was used to recreate famous historical battles, and Time Commanders by BBC Two, where teams of novice non-gamers commanded ancient armies to replay key battles of antiquity. Military historians fine-tuned the game engine specifically for these television shows, ensuring maximum historical accuracy. Both series also used the same music track as the battles in Rome: Total War.

Jeff van Dyck composed the original music soundtrack for the game and received a BAFTA Interactive Awards nomination for his work. Some of the vocals, including the song "Forever" played during the game's credits, were performed by his wife, Angela van Dyck. Angela also wrote the lyrics for the song "Divinitus," which was written in quasi-Latin.

In May 2014, GameSpy's multiplayer services were shut down, and as a result, the game was migrated to Steamworks as of Patch 1.51.

The iPad version of the game, developed by Feral Interactive, was announced on August 12, 2016 and released on November 10, 2016. The iPhone version was released on August 23, 2018. an Android version was announced on November 8, 2018, and was officially released on December 19th, 2018.

=== Modifications ===
Rome: Total War allows for the manipulation of some game resources, including its text files and textures, which has led to the creation of modifications. Among the most notable are Europa Barbarorum and Roma Surrectum, both of which aim to introduce more historical accuracy and rework how the factions are played.

== Reception ==
=== Sales ===
According to The NPD Group, Rome: Total War was the 20th-best-selling computer game of 2004. It maintained this position on NPD's annual computer game sales chart for the following year. In the United States alone, the game sold 390,000 copies and earned $16.8 million by August 2006. At the time, this led Edge to declare it the country's 40th-best-selling computer game, and best-selling Total War title, released since January 2000. The series as a whole, including Rome, sold 1.3 million units in the United States by August 2006. By 2013, Rome: Total War alone had totaled 876,000 sales in the region. It also received a "Platinum" sales award from the Entertainment and Leisure Software Publishers Association (ELSPA), indicating sales of at least 300,000 copies in the United Kingdom.

Rome sold at least 100,000 units in the German market by December 2004.

=== Critical reviews ===
Reception

Aggregate score
| Aggregator | Score |
|---|---|
| Metacritic | PC: 92/100 iOS: 83/100 |

Review scores
| Publication | Score |
|---|---|
| 1Up.com | A |
| Eurogamer | 9/10 |
| Game Informer | 7.75/10 |
| GameRevolution | A− |
| GameSpot | 9.1/10 |
| GameSpy | 4.5/5 |
| IGN | 9.4/10 |
| PC Gamer (UK) | 89 |
| X-Play | 5/5 |

The game received "universal acclaim", according to the review aggregation website Metacritic. Many reviewers regarded it as one of the best strategy games of all time; it won numerous awards and high scores from gaming websites and magazines alike.

- PC Gamer (UK): All time 5th best PC game "95%"
- IGN: Editor's Choice Award, 4th Best PC Game of all Time, 14th Best Game of all Time."IGN's Top 100 Games (#20-#11)". IGN. 2005. Archived from the original on July 16, 2005.
- PC Gamer (US): Editor's Choice, Best Strategy Game of 2004
- GameSpot: Editor's Choice, PC Game of September, Strategy Game of 2004
- Adrenaline Vault: Seal of Excellence
- GameSpy: Editor's Choice
- E3 2003 Game Critics Awards: Best Strategy Game

Computer Games Magazine named Rome: Total War the fifth-best computer game of 2004. The editors wrote, "If there's a magic formula for how to make a great strategy game, Creative Assembly has it down pat." The editors of Computer Gaming World nominated Rome as their 2004 "Strategy Game of the Year (Real-Time)", although it lost to Warhammer 40,000: Dawn of War. It was nominated for GameSpot's year-end "Best Graphics, Technical" award. During the 8th Annual Interactive Achievement Awards, the Academy of Interactive Arts & Sciences awarded Rome: Total War with "Strategy Game of the Year", along with receiving nominations for "Outstanding Innovation in Computer Gaming" and outstanding achievement in "Original Musical Composition", "Sound Design" and "Online Gameplay".

== Sequel ==
On July 2, 2012, The Creative Assembly announced the development of Total War: Rome II as the next edition of the Total War series. Rome II became its successor on 3 September 2013 when it was released, featuring gameplay during the time of the Roman Republic and Empire, a larger campaign map, as well as a number of game mechanics both new and carried over from previous Total War entries.

== Remaster ==
On March 25, 2021, 16 and a half years after its initial release, a remastered edition named Total War: Rome Remastered was announced. It would feature improved visuals, additional factions and a modernized interface; and cover the original game and all expansions. Developed by Feral Interactive, the remaster was released on April 29 of the same year. The reception was positive with reviews stating that the remastered edition was the best way to play Rome: Total War today, but that the game mechanics felt outdated compared to more recent releases in the Total War series.

Like the original game, the remaster supports modding. Among the most notable, Imperium Surrectum made by the mod developers behind mods Rome: Total Realism and Roma Surrectum for the original game.
