= Tim Wynn =

American film composer (born 1970)

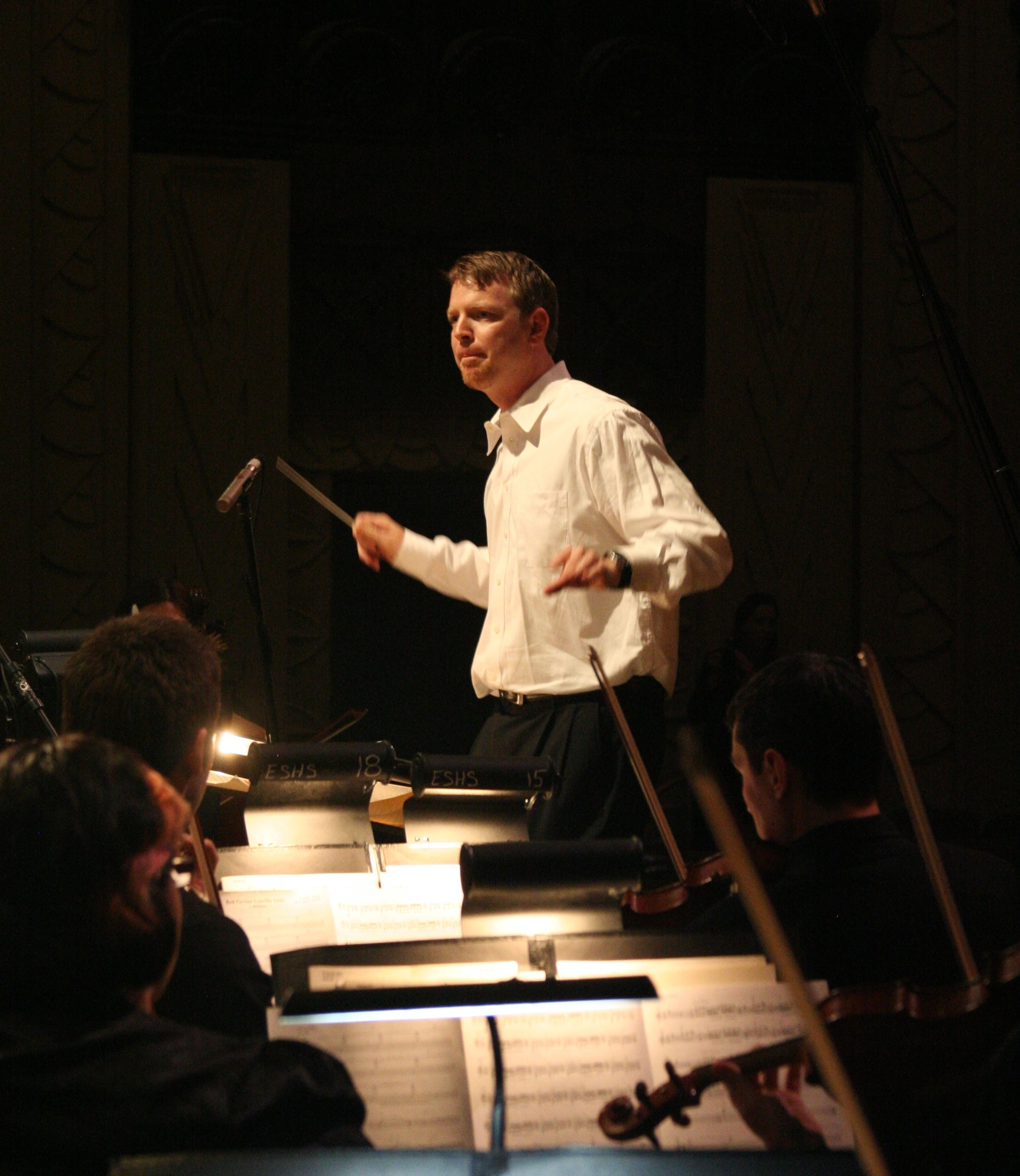
- Wynn conducting the Golden State Pops Orchestra, 2009.

Background information
- Born: Timothy Michael Wynn
- Occupations: Composer for film, Television, and Games
- Years active: 1994–present
- Website: timwynn.net

Timothy Michael Wynn (born May 5, 1970) is an American musical composer for films, television shows, and video games. His co-score for Warhawk was recognized as one of the best video game scores for 2007 by IGN and the International Film Music Critics Association.

== Education ==
Wynn began his music training as a founding member of the prestigious Orange County High School of the Performing Arts in 1988. From there he was accepted into the Thornton School of Music at the University of Southern California, where he studied under Elmer Bernstein, Christopher Young, Buddy Baker and Jerry Goldsmith.

== Career ==
Wynn started his professional career writing the score for Last Chance. While working on the film, he met aspiring music supervisor Alex Patsavas. The two would continue working on the films, including The Prophet and Recoil. In 2000, Wynn worked on a documentary for Steven Spielberg, to be used for the opening of the United States Holocaust Memorial Museum in Washington, DC. After the documentary, he went on to score other documentaries including D-Day, Moments of Truth, and Filmscapes.

In 2002, Wynn scored the ABC television series The Chair. He also composed music for the ABC television series Thieves and Joel Silver's The Strip. In 2003, he was tapped to score the feature film, Descendant. His next project was the acclaimed Warner Brothers documentary, James Dean: Forever Young, narrated by Martin Sheen. He then switched gears and scored the comedy Partners, in 2005. In 2007, Wynn wrote the music for the international television series ODYSSEY: Driving Around the World and the American television series Supernatural. In 2009, he worked on the ABC television series The Deep End.

Wynn began writing music for video games in 2005, starting with The Punisher. In 2007, he teamed up with longtime partner Christopher Lennertz to write the score for Warhawk, which was nominated for Score of the Year by the International Film Music Critics and was chosen one of the best scores of 2007 by IGN. Wynn's next project was scoring The Simpsons Game which later received a Game Audio Network Guild (G.A.N.G.) award for Best Arrangement of a Non-Original Score. He then went on to produce tracks for Gun. In 2008, he scored the award-winning franchise Command & Conquer: Red Alert 3. In 2009, he scored Command & Conquer: Red Alert 3 – Uprising and Red Faction Guerrilla). In 2010, Wynn composed the score for Command & Conquer 4: Tiberian Twilight.

He was also as part of a collaboration between several of the biggest names of Hollywood composers entitled, "A Symphony of Hope", which benefited victims of the 2010 Haiti earthquake.

== Credits ==
=== Film ===
==== 1990s ====
Year	Title	Director(s)	Studio(s)	Notes
1995	Terminal Virus	Dan Golden	Concorde-New Horizons	Television film
1997	Macon County Jail	Victoria Muspratt	Concorde-New Horizons	—N/a
1998	Recoil	Art Camacho	—N/a	—N/a
1999	The Prophet	Fred Olen Ray	Concorde-New Horizons	—N/a

==== 2000s ====
Year	Title	Director(s)	Studio(s)	Notes
2000	Stalkers	Jesse Weathington	—N/a	Short film
2001	Moments of Truth with Stephen Amborse	Chris Harty	—N/a	Television film
2002	Time Machine: Lindbergh Flies Again	Chris Harty	—N/a	Television film
2002	Manual Labor	Jeff Wadlow	—N/a	Short film
2003	Descendant	Kermit Christman; Del Tenney	York Entertainment	—N/a
2004	FilmScapes: A Filmmaker's Journey to Extraordinary Places	Louis Schwartzberg	—N/a	Television film
2004	Worth Killing For	Jesse Weatahington	—N/a	Direct-to-video film
2005	James Dean:Forever Young	Michael J. Sheridan	Warner Bros.	Documentary film
2005	Partner(s)	Dave Diamond	Lions Gate Films	—N/a
2006	Ice	Louis Schwartzberg	Blacklight Films	Video short
2006	Grave Spirits	Louis Schwartzberg	Disney/Blacklight Films	Video short
2006	Jet Stream	Louis Schwartzberg	Disney/Blacklight Films	Documentary short
2006	Chasing the Light	Louis Schwartzberg	Blacklight Films	Television film
2007	Reflections of Venice	Louis Schwartzberg	Disney/Blacklight Films	Documentary short

==== 2010s ====
Year	Title	Director(s)	Studio(s)	Notes
2010	To Save a Life	Brian Baugh	Samuel Goldwyn Films	—N/a
2012	Liberator	Aaron Pope	Coverage Ink	Short film
2012	McKenna Shoots for the Stars	Vince Marcello	Universal Home Video	—N/a
2013	The Starving Games	Jason Friedberg; Aaron Seltzer	—N/a	—N/a
2013	Battle of the Year	Benson Lee	Screen Gems	Additional Music
2014	MK Reloaded	—N/a	—N/a	—N/a
2015	Superfast!	Jason Friedberg and Aaron Seltzer	The Safran Company	
2018	Freaks	Zach Lipovsky and Adam Stein	—N/a	

==== 2020s ====
Year	Title	Director(s)	Studio(s)	Notes
2025	Final Destination Bloodlines	Zach Lipovsky and Adam Stein	New Line Cinema	Original Final Destination themes by Shirley Walker
2026	Freaks Part II	Zach Lipovsky and Adam Stein	Elevation Pictures	

=== Television ===
- The Strip (1999)
- Thieves (2001)
- The Chair (2002)
- Supernatural (2018–2020) (with Christopher Lennertz)
- The Deep End (2010)
- Tokyo Control (2011)
- Lucky Seven (2012)
- Wolfpack of Reseda (TV series) (2012)
- Tokyo Airport Air Traffic Services Department (TV Mini-Series) (2012)
- Atelier (2015)
- Mech-X4 (2016–2018)

=== Video games ===
- The Punisher (2005)
- Gun (2005)
- The Simpsons Game (2007) (Additional music with Christopher Lennertz, score composed by Hans Zimmer and James Dooley)
- Command & Conquer: Red Alert 3 (2008)
- Command & Conquer: Red Alert 3 - Uprising (2009)
- Red Faction Guerrilla (2009)
- Command & Conquer 4: Tiberian Twilight (2010)
- Dungeon Siege III (2011)
- The Darkness II (2012)
- Madden NFL 25 (2013) (with Christopher Lennertz)
- Total War Battles: Kingdom (2015)
- Total War: Atilla (2015)
- XCOM 2 (2016)
- Total War: Warhammer (2016)
- XCOM 2: War of the Chosen (2017)
- Total War: Warhammer II (2017)
- Total War Saga: Thrones of Britannia (2018)
- Total War: Three Kingdoms (2019)
- Total War Saga: Troy (2020)
- Marvel's Midnight Suns (2022)

== Sources ==
- http://www.music4games.net/Features_Display.aspx?id=279 Archived from the original 2008/07/02
- https://www.webcitation.org/67fNUmatQ?url=http://music.ign.com/articles/831/831403p1.html Archived
- http://filmmusiccritics.org/awards-archive/2007-ifmca-awards/ Archived
- https://www.webcitation.org/67fNZp3Lf?url=http://music.ign.com/articles/843/843573p1.html
- http://www.audiogang.org/index.php?option=com_content&task=view&id=159&Itemid=188
- http://www.vgmrush.com/artist.php?id=67
- http://www.odysseyshow.com/
- http://www.originalsoundversion.com/osvostoty-2012-winner-for-best-in-game-soundtrack-is/#more-18941
