= Stéphane Cornicard =

French actor

- Born: France
- Occupations: Actor, director

Stéphane Cornicard is a multilingual actor and director (French, English, German, Spanish and Italian), who trained in France with François David, French director and writer, at Colby College, U.S. and at Goldsmiths, University of London, UK.

== Career ==
Cornicard's many credits include Jean in Saving Private Ryan by Steven Spielberg; Liquid Snake in Metal Gear and Gabe Logan in Syphon Filter; the evil Count Raum in Primal; enigmatic profiler Gerd Hanke in Evidence: The Last Ritual by Eric Viennot; the narration for Napoleon Bonaparte in the video game Napoleon: Total War in English, French, German and Spanish; Charlemagne in the later Total War: Attila; Riordan in BioWare's Dragon Age: Origins; Stroud in Dragon Age II and Dragon Age: Inquisition; and necromancer Rasial in RuneScape. He gave his voice to the French Red Cross for their anti-personnel landmines campaign. He also played the character Lonesome Gavlan in FromSoftware's Dark Souls II (English version).

Cornicard appeared in the Doctor Who audio drama The Next Life. He also presents Ma France, web based French classes and podcasts for BBC.

Stéphane Cornicard stars as hapless truffle hunter Jean Dubois in Tom Tagholm's A Bout de Truffe, winner of TCM Classic Shorts Film Competition 2007, Best Film, Best UK Short at Raindance Film Festival 2007, Grand Jury Award at Dances with Film Festival 2007.

== Partial filmography ==
- Saving Private Ryan (1998) - Jean
- Sky Captain and the World of Tomorrow (2004) - French Broadcaster
- Brideshead Revisited (2008) - Doctor Henri
- Spirit of the Forest (2008) - Twins (voice)
- Jack and the Cuckoo-Clock Heart (2013) - Georges Méliès (English version, voice)
- Spectre (2015) - Head of Nation #3

=== Television ===
- Human Body: Pushing the Limits (2008) - Caver (1 episode - Brain Power)
- Come Fly With Me (2011) - French passenger (1 episode)

=== Video games ===
- Metal Gear Solid (1998) - Liquid Snake
- Driver 3 (2004) - Henri Vauban
- Syphon Filter (1999 - 2007) - Gabriel Logan
- Medieval II: Total War (2006) - French general
- Dragon Age: Origins (2009) - Riordan
- Napoleon: Total War (2010) - Napoleon Bonaparte
- Dragon Age II (2011) - Stroud/Hubert
- Total War: Shogun 2: Fall of the Samurai (2012) - French veteran
- Dragon Age: Inquisition (2014) - Stroud
- Total War: Attila Age of Charlemagne expansion (2015) - Charlemagne
- Overwatch (2016) - Maximilien
- Total War: Warhammer (2016) - Louen Leonceour
- Dark Souls III (2016) - Greirat of the Undead Settlement
- Bohemian Killing (2016) - Alfred Ethon
- Total War: Warhammer II (2017) - Louen Leonceour
- Horizon Zero Dawn (2017) - Patrick Brochard-Klein
- A Plague Tale: Innocence (2019) - Vitalis Benevent
- Control (2019) - Ahti
- Age of Empires II: Definitive Edition (2019) - Guy Josselyne, additional voices
- Expeditions: Rome (2022) - Syneros
- Total War: Warhammer III (2022) - Louen Leonceour
- RuneScape (2023) - Rasial, the First Necromancer
- Overwatch 2 (Launched 2023, voiced 2024) - Maximilien
- Commandos: Origins (2025) - The Spy
