= Creative Assembly Sofia =

Bulgarian video game developer

Sega Black Sea EOOD
- Trade name: Creative Assembly Sofia
- Formerly: Black Sea Studios; (2001–2008); Crytek Black Sea; (2008–2017)
- Type: Subsidiary
- Industry: Video games
- Founded: 7 May 2001; 25 years ago
- Founder: Vesselin Handjiev
- Headquarters: Sofia, Bulgaria
- Key people: Georgi Dinchev (studio head)
- Products: Knights of Honor; WorldShift; Total War series
- Number of employees: 60 (2017)
- Parent: Crytek; (2008–2017); Creative Assembly; (2017–present)

Sega Black Sea EOOD, officially doing business as Creative Assembly Sofia (formerly Black Sea Studios and Crytek Black Sea) is a Bulgarian video game developer based in Sofia. It was founded in May 2001 by Vesselin Handjiev. In July 2008, the company was acquired by Crytek, which then sold it to Creative Assembly (a studio of Sega) in March 2017.

== History ==
=== Black Sea Studios (2001–2008) ===
Black Sea Studios was founded by Vesselin Handjiev, the lead designer of Tzar: The Burden of the Crown, on 7 May 2001 in Sofia, Bulgaria. At the time, the company began developing three separate games: two real-time strategy games and one arcade-style action game. The company became known for its 2004 title Knights of Honor, a historical real-time strategy game released for Microsoft Windows, and for the 2008 science fiction real-time strategy title WorldShift.

In 2016, some of the former developers from Black Sea Studios founded Black Sea Games, which in 2022 released Knights of Honor II: Sovereign, a sequel to Knights of Honor.

=== Crytek Black Sea (2008–2017) ===
In July 2008, German developer and publisher Crytek announced their acquisition of the studio, and renamed it Crytek Black Sea. At the time, Black Sea Studios was based in Sofia, Bulgaria, with Vesselin Handijev was managing director. In May 2014, Crytek announced the development of their own multiplayer online battle arena game using the CryEngine, titled Arena of Fate and under development at the Sofia studio. The game was shown at E3 2014. In November 2016, founder Handjiev, together with Michael Peykov, formed a new video game company, Black Sea Games.

In December 2016, Crytek announced that it would shut down five of its international studios, due to financial troubles, of which Crytek Black Sea was put up for sale.

=== Creative Assembly Sofia (2017–present) ===
In March 2017, it was announced that the studio was acquired by British developer Creative Assembly (itself owned by Sega), and was renamed Creative Assembly Sofia. At the time, Crytek Black Sea had 60 employees. Under Creative Assembly, Creative Assembly Sofia developed downloadable content for Total War: Rome II, including Empire Divided and Rise of the Republic. It also developed a new game in the Total War Saga series, Total War Saga: Troy.

On 23 May 2023, Total War: Pharaoh, focused on the New Kingdom period of Ancient Egypt, was announced, with Creative Assembly Sofia's Todor Nikolov as Game Director. The game was released in October 2023.

== Games developed ==
Year	Title	Platform(s)	Developed as
2004	Knights of Honor	Microsoft Windows	Black Sea Studios
2008	WorldShift	Microsoft Windows	Black Sea Studios
2017	Total War: Rome II – Empire Divided	Microsoft Windows	Creative Assembly Sofia
2018	Total War: Rome II – Rise of the Republic	Microsoft Windows	Creative Assembly Sofia
2020	Total War Saga: Troy	Microsoft Windows	Creative Assembly Sofia
2023	Total War: Pharaoh	Microsoft Windows	Creative Assembly Sofia

=== Cancelled ===
- Arena of Fate

== See also ==
- Haemimont Games, another Bulgarian game developer with a focus on strategy games
