= Total War: Pharaoh =

2023 turn-based strategy real-time tactics video game

- Developer: Creative Assembly Sofia
- Publisher: Sega
- Directors: Maya Georgieva; Todor Nikolov
- Designer: Milcho Vasilev
- Series: Total War
- Platforms: macOS; Windows
- Release: October 11, 2023
- Genres: Turn-based strategy, real-time tactics
- Modes: Single-player, multiplayer

Total War: Pharaoh is a turn-based strategy real-time tactics video game developed by Creative Assembly Sofia and published by Sega. Part of the Total War series, Pharaoh is set in the New Kingdom of Egypt and its surrounding areas before the Late Bronze Age collapse. The game was released for Windows PC and macOS on October 11, 2023. Feral Interactive publishes the game's macOS version.

== Gameplay ==
Total War: Pharaoh is a turn-based strategy real-time tactics video game. In the game, the player can choose from eight leaders, representing the game's three factions: Ancient Egypt (Seti II, Amenmesse, Tausret, and Ramesses III), the Canaanites of the Levant (Bay and Irsu), and the fragmented Hittite Empire under Šuppiluliuma II and Kurunta in Anatolia. New to the series is unit stance. Units in the game can now advance, hold (or forming a shield wall or a spear wall), and fall back. When unit falls back, they will retreat and slowly cede ground while maintaining formation and facing forward. Units' armour will also degrade, causing them to become progressively more vulnerable during confrontations. As with Troy, environments and armour will affect unit movement. For instance, heavier units will become exhausted faster, and become bogged down in mud. Natural disasters will impact the terrain. For instance, a thunderstorm may create more mud and create harsh conditions for heavy units, while a sandstorm will drastically reduce visibility, rendering archers useless. Fire will also spread across the battlefield, destroying buildings and killing units caught in it. As the players progress in the game, they will be able to recruit units that are more adept to Egypt's harsh weather and terrain conditions. Siege battles also underwent changes. Each settlement now has three capture points, with each bringing a unique boost to the army that controls it. For instance, one capture point may boost an army's morale, while another may boost their stamina.

The Sea Peoples serve as Pharaoh's endgame threat, while spawning in "waves" every two in-game years, for instance the scripted "Weshesh wave" in 1200 BCE and "Shekelesh wave" in 1198 BC. The number of Sea Peoples armies spawned with each wave can be customized through Pharaoh's campaign customization menu, and these armies increase in size, number, and quality as society enters a state of collapse. In addition to periodic Sea Peoples invasions, players regularly contend with Libu raiding parties in western Egypt and Phrygian and Kaska invasions in western and northern Anatolia.

The "Pillars of Civilisation" is a world-state metric in a campaign, influencing stability and the severity of negative events leading to the Bronze Age Collapse. Represented as a meter with three sections – Prosperity, Crisis, and Collapse – it's tied to disasters and the strength of the Sea Peoples. This metric, referencing historically significant Cult Centres, impacts the frequency of wars, regional stability, and event occurrences. High scores keep the meter in "Prosperity", reducing disasters, increasing blessings, and weakening Sea Peoples' invasions. Players must strive to maintain this score by controlling Cult Centres through effective province management, resource balance, and fortifications, essential for surviving the Bronze Age Collapse challenges, though full control remains challenging due to the historical context.

Players can opt to pursue two "royal legacies": the Pharaoh of Egypt or the Hittite "Great King". Merneptah starts the game as Pharaoh, but, before or after his pre-scripted death in 1202 BC, rival factions can initiate a civil war to seize control of the throne. Likewise, while Suppiluliuma starts the game as Great King of the Hittites, he can be challenged in a civil war by any rival faction.

== Development ==
The game was developed by Creative Assembly Sofia, which had previously worked on Total War Saga: Troy. Described as a fully-fledged historical Total War game, the team stripped away the more fantastical elements founded in games such as Total War: Warhammer and Total War: Three Kingdoms for an experience that is more grounded in reality. Creative director Maya Georgieva added that as opposed to Troy, the game is a "fully historical title", one that is not "diluted or looking for multiple representations". The pace of battle was significantly slower when compared to Troy, with director Todor Nikolov adding that the team wanted players to make "fewer" but more "impactful" decisions, and that combat now requires less micromanagement from players.

As the game is set in a tumultuous period of time, the game world will become progressively more dangerous. The player needs to guide their civilization through this period of political hardship. Prosperity will result in the game becoming brighter visually and will boost production. However, as regions become politically unstable, settlements will be attacked by the Sea Peoples more frequently, and natural disasters will become more intense, ultimately leading to the late Bronze Age collapse.

The New Kingdom of Egypt was chosen as the game's setting, as the team felt that Egypt has never been properly explored in a Total War title. Director Todor Nikolov added that the empire during the Bronze Age collapse was facing political turmoil, threats from neighbouring states, and a possible invasion from the enigmatic Sea Peoples, making it a great setting for a Total War game. The team studied extensively the three factions featured in the game, in particularly their ways of governance and approaches to warfare. The little-known Sea Peoples serves as the game's endgame threat. They are depicted in the game as a coalition of multi-ethnic seafaring warriors, and their design was based on "fragments of art and written accounts".

== Release ==
After its initial announcement of the game in May, Total War: Pharaoh was released for Windows PC in October 2023. The game was originally announced with "Deluxe" and "Dynasty" editions that were bundled with upcoming paid downloadable content, including a campaign pack and three faction packs. In December 2023, Creative Assembly announced that these special editions would be removed from sale and that the base price of Pharaoh would be reduced from $59.99 to $39.99. Partial refunds were issued to all users who purchased the game prior to these price changes. In addition, it was announced that the first faction pack would be released as a free update for all players. Development of future DLC was cut back in favour of improving the base game through patches and free updates.

A patch titled High Tide, previously intended as the first faction pack, was released on 25 January 2024, introducing two new factions of Sea Peoples, Peleset and Sherden. In May 2024, it was revealed that a major map expansion would include additional regions such as Mesopotamia, Western Anatolia, Thracia, Achaea, and Crete, featuring 168 new settlements and four new major factions including Babylon, Assyria, Mycenae, and Troy, along with 25 new minor factions. This patch, titled Dynasties, was released on 25 July of the same year.

== Reception ==
Reception

Aggregate scores
Aggregator	Score
Metacritic	PC: 74/100
OpenCritic	54% recommend

Review scores
Publication	Score
IGN	8/10
PC Gamer (UK)	80/100

Total War: Pharaoh received "mixed or average" reviews from critics and users according to review aggregator, Metacritic. As of October 2023, Pharaoh received a 'mixed' rating on Steam, with players criticizing the game for its interface and its lack of new features when compared with Total War Saga: Troy.

Leana Hafer of IGN complimented the game's battles and the campaign story. Tom Senior of Eurogamer enjoyed the strategy aspect of the game but found the battle experience limited. Rick Lane, a reviewer at PC Gamer, commended Total War: Pharaoh for its captivating strategy gameplay, particularly in an era with limited military tools. He highlighted the innovative "Power of the Crown" system, which allows players to compete for leadership roles through civil wars, creating compelling narratives and interactions on the campaign map.
