= Total War Saga: Troy =

2020 turn-based strategy video game

- Developer: Creative Assembly Sofia
- Publisher: Sega
- Director: Maya Georgieva
- Series: Total War
- Platforms: macOS, Windows
- Release: 13 August 2020
- Genres: Turn-based strategy, real-time tactics
- Modes: Single-player, multiplayer

Total War Saga: Troy is a 2020 turn-based strategy video game developed by Creative Assembly Sofia and published by Sega. The game was released for Windows and MacOS on 13 August 2020 as the second installment in the Total War Saga subseries, succeeding Thrones of Britannia (2018). The game received generally positive reviews upon release.

== Gameplay ==
Like its predecessors, Total War Saga: Troy is a turn-based strategy game with real-time tactics elements. The game is set in the Bronze Age, during the Trojan War, though its scope also covers the surrounding Aegean civilizations. Real-time battles take place in large sandboxes, and players can command the infantry, hero units (Note: Faction leaders are: Achilles of Phthia, Agamemnon of Mycenae, Odysseus of Ithaca, and Menelaus of Sparta, all from the Achaeans; Hector, Paris and Aeneas of the Dardanians, all from the Pelasgians; Sarpedon of Lycia from the Leleges; and Hippolyte and Penthesilea from the Amazons.) as well as mystical beasts as they battle opponent forces. There are a total of eight heroes representing the two factions (the Trojans and the Achaeans), and each hero has two unique abilities that can be used during battles. As the player progress in the game, they can also build their relationship with the Greek gods. If the approval ratings with the Gods are high enough, the player would gain gameplay benefits. Outside of battles, players also need to collect sufficient resources, such as wood, bronze and food, in order to keep the army running. Agents return in Troy, and players can send priests and spies to infiltrate hostile cities. Multiplayer, which supports up to 8 players, was introduced on November 26, 2020.

== Development ==
The game is the second installment in the Total War Saga subseries, following 2018's Total War Saga: Thrones of Britannia. Troy, similar to its predecessor, was designed to be a shorter but more focused game, and its scope was limited to a particular time period in history instead of being era-spanning. The lead developer is Creative Assembly Sofia based in Bulgaria, which took approximately two years and nine months to develop the game. According to Maya Georgieva, the game's director, the Bronze Age was a very difficult setting to work on due to the lack of detailed historical records and sources. As a result, the team resorted to using the Iliad, an ancient Greek epic poem, to fill up the historical details that were missing. Despite the mythical elements, the team tried to make the game as historically grounded as possible. Georgieva called this approach "truth behind the myth", in which the team came up with the "most probable explanations for the myths and legends to complete the history". For instance, the Trojan horse would be an earthquake, a siege tower, or a massive wooden structure instead of a huge, wooden horse. While a second "Historical Mode" was added as a Free DLC along with the "Mythos" Pack. The "Historical Mode" makes the game more truthful, adding bodyguards to leaders as "Truth Behind The Myth" has none. Along with that, it removes Truth Behind The Myth's Passive buffs from Gods and adds only slight bonuses from supporting them.

Total War Saga: Troy was announced by publisher Sega on 19 September 2019. It was released on 13 August 2020 for Windows via the Epic Games Store, where it was exclusively available for one year. Creative Assembly later confirmed that this was a one-off deal with Epic Games, and added that they did not plan to make future Total War games exclusive to a storefront. As Creative Assembly hoped to expand the audience of the franchise, the game was made free to claim for the first 24 hours after its release. 7.5 million people claimed the game for free on that day, exceeding the developer's expectations. Creative Assembly will be working with Epic to incorporate mod support upon the game's release. A downloadable content pack based on the Amazons was released on 24 September 2020. A Linux version was planned by Feral Interactive, but was later cancelled, citing lowered demand due to the availability of Proton.

== Reception ==
Reception

Aggregate score
Aggregator	Score
Metacritic	75/100

Review scores
Publication	Score
Computer Games Magazine	7/10
Destructoid	7.5/10
Eurogamer	Recommended
GameSpot	7/10
IGN	8/10
PC Gamer (US)	75/100
PCGamesN	8/10
Shacknews	7/10
VentureBeat	80/100

The game received generally positive reviews upon release, according to review aggregator platform Metacritic.

The game was available for free in the Epic Games Store. This resulted in 7.5 million claimed copies in a single day.

== Downloadable content ==
Following the game's release, Creative Assembly released several DLC packs for the game that added extra content such as new factions, leaders, and mission chains.

Paid DLC
Name	Release date	Description
The Amazons	September 2020	Adds the playable Amazon faction and two leaders, Penthesilea and Hippolyta. The DLC was free from its release on September 24, 2020, to October 8, 2020, for owners of the base game.
Blood and Glory	October 2020	Adds various blood and gore effects in battles and on the campaign map following high-casualty battles. Similar to the Blood for the Blood God DLC released for both Total War: Warhammer and Total War: Warhammer II.
Ajax & Diomedes	January 2021	Adds two new factions and leaders, Salamis, led by Ajax, and Argos, led by Diomedes. In addition, new Paragon units were introduced to the game, functioning as elite variants of base units.
Mythos	September 2021	Adds a new Mythological Mode to the game that introduces mythological creatures to the game that can be recruited or captured via Mythic Expeditions and used in the player's armies. The Lernean Hydra, Cerberus, and Griffin Patriarch can all be captured during these Mythic Expeditions.
Rhesus and Memnon	December 2021	Adds two new factions and leaders, Thrace, led by Rhesus, and Aethiopia, led by Memnon. Both new factions have a plethora of new mechanics unique to them.
