= Arena of Fate =

- Developer(s): Crytek Black Sea
- Publisher(s): Crytek
- Director(s): Vesselin Handjiev
- Composer(s): Inon Zur
- Engine: CryEngine 3
- Platform(s): Microsoft Windows
- Release: Cancelled
- Genre(s): Multiplayer online battle arena
- Mode(s): Multiplayer

Arena of Fate was a cancelled free-to-play multiplayer online battle arena (MOBA) video game developed by Crytek Black Sea. The game was announced in May 2014, closed beta began on August 5, 2015. It featured five-against-five battles with legendary heroes from history and fantasy.

On September 17, 2016, studio director Vesselin Handjiev left Crytek Black Sea, along with his position as game director for Arena of Fate. In 2017, Crytek Black Sea was sold to Creative Assembly, a subsidiary of Sega.

== Gameplay ==
Arena of Fate featured certain mechanics common to the MOBA genre - there were two teams, five players each, fighting over control of the map. The lanes have a series of towers that must be destroyed, and waves of AI-controlled minions make their way down the lanes toward the enemy base. Each player controlled a hero that can use powerful abilities.

Heroes gained gold as the match progressed and when enough gold was accumulated the players earned the right to acquire a new trait. To activate the new trait the hero needed only stay stationary and unharmed for a few seconds. Traits provided boost to max health, add lifesteal and have other similar effects.

When the match starts each player has to choose one of the seven hero roles. The role determines the player's position on the team. The Breaker role helps in the destruction of towers while the Keeper role helps defending them.

Central to the game is the twenty-minute time limit. There were three ways to win a match.
