= WorldShift =

2008 video game

- Developer(s): Black Sea Studios
- Publisher(s): GER: RTL Games; AU: n3vrf41l Publishing; NA: Got Game Entertainment
- Designer(s): Vesselin Handjiev
- Engine: Gamebryo
- Platform(s): Microsoft Windows
- Release: GER: May 8, 2008; AU: September 9, 2008; NA: November 16, 2009
- Genre(s): Real-time strategy
- Mode(s): Single-player, multiplayer

WorldShift is a science fiction real-time strategy video game developed by Black Sea Studios and released in 2008.

== Plot ==
In the 21st century, a mysterious object lands on Earth ending all known civilization. WorldShift is set thousands of years after those events, when the human civilization is no more than just a fading myth. The remains of the mysterious object, known as Shard Zero, are still spreading its Plague and reshaping the Earth. The human race has developed a new culture and is now living in five shielded mega-cities, struggling to survive from day to day. The rest of the Earth is populated by what is known to be the Tribes, successors of the early humans that were affected by the Plague, and the Cult, a mysterious alien race with unknown origins.

== Gameplay ==
In WorldShift, there are no technology trees featuring hundreds of upgrades; instead, WorldShift allows the players to discover and acquire a vast number of items and powerful relics that they can use to freely change their gameplay and preferred tactics and to attack their enemies. The players will gather items as they fight their opponents and as rewards for completing missions. There is a three-tiered unit system, with outstanding leader units, strong officer units and then more common basic units. The game is centered on unique cooperative multiplayer gameplay.

Many units in WorldShift have power which the player can spend to perform special actions such as spells, healing, or stronger attacks. Some units also have shields able to absorb the strength of an incoming attack partly or entirely.

== Reception ==
Reception

Aggregate score
| Aggregator | Score |
|---|---|
| Metacritic | 63/100 |

Review scores
| Publication | Score |
|---|---|
| 4Players | 69% |
| GameSpot | 6.5/10 |
| GameStar | 70% |
| IGN | 5/10 |

The game received "mixed" reviews according to the review aggregation website Metacritic.
