= Tokyo Control (TV series) =

- Poster
- Directed by: Gaku Narita
- Starring: Ayako Kawahara; Saburō Tokitō; Misa Shimizu; Zen Kajiwara
- Composer: Timothy Michael Wynn
- Country of origin: Japan
- Original language: Japanese
- No. of episodes: 10

Original release
- Network: SKY PerfecTV!
- Release: January 19 – May 25, 2011

Related
- Tokyo Airport: Air Traffic Controller

Tokyo Control (TOKYO コントロール) is a 2011 Japanese television drama series that is produced by Sony and Fuji Television. It is the first television series in 3D made in Japan. It revolves around air traffic control, and it stars Ayako Kawahara and Saburō Tokitō.

Tokyo Control premiered on Sky PerfecTV! HD, a subscription-based channel on the Fuji Television network, on January 19, 2012. It was aired in both 2D and 3D formats, and has a total of 10 episodes. The series has been well received by viewers.

== Cast ==
- Ayako Kawahara as Maki Suzuki, one of the chief air-traffic controllers
- Saburō Tokitō as Noboru Yuki, a chief air traffic controller
- Misa Shimizu as Kimie Saitou, a daytime air traffic controller
- Zen Kajihara as Motoharu Yano, a chief air traffic controller
- Maho Nonami as Haru Nakajima, an air traffic controller with 3 years of experience
- Takuma Oto as Kouji Hara, one of the chief air traffic controllers
- Rome Kanda as Keichi Ota, a chief air traffic controller
- Yosuke Kawamura as Makoto Yamada, a trainee air traffic controller
- Masanobu Sakata as Tetsushi Shimoyanagi, one of the chief air traffic controllers
- Toru Nomaguchi as Takashi Shikishima, an air traffic controller with 5 years of experience and loves coffee
- Takashi Ito as Kazuma Kinoshita, a drillmaster
- Yuji Sugao as Takeshi Matsumoto, an air traffic controller with 5 years of experience
- Narumi Konno as Narumi Kawamoto, an air traffic controller with 2 years of experience
- Naoto Kinosaki as Kodai Takahashi, an air traffic technician
- Takehiko Ono Hiroshi Yokoyama, an air traffic technician, but retires and works for a coffee shop

== Production ==
The production team consulted with the production staff of the film Avatar before making the series.

== Reception ==
Rick Martin described the series as "Surprisingly good" and that it "was smartly photographed to take full advantage of the 3-D platform". He also praised its filming technique, saying that its "camera movements are slow and subtle enough so as not to be distracting, but they're significant enough to continually create noticeable changes in perspective."

The series producer said that of the emails the production crew received, "nearly all [were] positive". He added that most "viewers find the stories interesting."
