= Total War: Three Kingdoms =

2019 turn-based strategy game

- Developer: Creative Assembly
- Publisher: Sega
- Director: Janos Gaspar
- Designer: Attila Mohacsi
- Programmer: Chris Budd
- Artist: Pawel Wojs
- Writers: Peter Stewart; Dion Lay
- Composer: Richard Beddow
- Series: Total War
- Platforms: Linux, macOS, Windows
- Release: May 23, 2019
- Genres: Turn-based strategy, real-time tactics
- Modes: Single-player, multiplayer

Total War: Three Kingdoms is a turn-based strategy real-time tactics video game developed by Creative Assembly and published by Sega. As the 12th mainline entry (the 13th entry) in the Total War series, the game was released for Windows on May 23, 2019. Feral Interactive released a Linux and macOS version of the game on the same day.

== Gameplay ==
In Total War: Three Kingdoms, generals can engage in a one-versus-one dueling, which ends when one of them dies or flees.

Like its predecessors, Total War: Three Kingdoms is a turn-based strategy real-time tactics game. Set during the End of the Han dynasty (189-220) and into the Three Kingdoms era (220–280), the player controls one of the factions, who must eliminate or vassalize other factions, gaining enough prestige to declare themselves Emperor. The player must also defeat the other two Emperors which are the two most powerful factions, unify China and become its ultimate ruler. These factions are led by warlords, such as Cao Cao, Liu Bei, and Sun Quan. In siege battles, the player commands both infantry and cavalry units. All the units featured in the game are divided into different retinues, with each led by a powerful general. The player can deploy up to three generals into the battlefield at once along with three in reserve, and there will only be access to the units that those generals can recruit.

The player wins a siege battle when all hostile generals are killed or the central point of the city is captured. These generals, which can be commanded separately from their troops, have the possession of unique ancillaries, that can be looted once they are killed. For instance, Lü Bu's Red Hare can be captured and used by other generals. Generals can engage in a one-versus-one dueling, which ends when one of them dies or flees. Each general has different classes and specialties, granting their units with both active and passive buffs. The team introduces the concept of "guanxi" to the game, in which each general will form social connections and relationships with other characters. Viewing concepts like "obligations, reciprocity, and trust" as important virtues, these generals have unique personalities and desires that the player needs to cater to. If their demands are not met, their happiness rating will drop and this may lead to various repercussions. Unlike previous Total War games where characters rarely interact with each other, the generals featured in the game are actively forming relationships with the people they meet throughout the campaign. This adds a strategic layer to the game in which players need to understand these generals before making any decisions.

The game features two modes. The first mode, "Romance", is based on the novel Romance of the Three Kingdoms, in which generals are gifted with nearly superhuman strength. Another mode, "Records", based on Records of the Three Kingdoms, presents a more historically authentic version. In Records, the generals have their powers removed and they can no longer be commanded separately, in addition to changing certain equipment in-game to be more historically authentic.

== Plot ==
Taking place in 190 AD, the once glorious Han dynasty is on the verge of collapse. The new emperor, Emperor Xian, enthroned at the age of eight, was manipulated by the warlord Dong Zhuo, whose oppressive rule leads to chaos. New warlords rise and form alliances to start the campaign against Dong Zhuo. With each warlord having personal ambitions and allegiances constantly shifting, the champions that emerge from the everlasting wars will shape the future of China.

== Development and release ==
The game was developed by Creative Assembly. Creative Assembly had refined many elements of the game, bringing changes to both the artificial intelligence and the user interface. The team introduced the system of "guanxi" in order to make the characters and generals more important in the game, as Records and Romances, two of the team's most prominent source materials, have a huge focus on characters. The sinologist Rafe de Crespigny, an expert on the era, acted as a consultant for the game.

When the game was still in preproduction in November 2016, Creative Assembly announced that the next historical Total War title would explore a new era instead of being a sequel to any prior game. Three Kingdoms was revealed by publisher Sega on January 11, 2018 with a cinematic trailer. Originally set to be released in the second half of 2018, the game was delayed to early 2019 so that the team had additional development time to complete the production. A new release date of March 7, 2019 was later announced, which was then delayed to May 23, 2019.

== Downloadable content ==
Several pieces of downloadable content have been released, including the following:

Paid DLC
Name	Release date	Description
Yellow Turban Rebellion	May 2019	Adds three playable factions associated with the Yellow Turban Rebellion into the main campaign.
Reign of Blood	June 2019	Adds blood and gore effects.
Eight Princes	August 2019	Adds a new campaign based on the War of the Eight Princes during the Jin dynasty, set 100 years after the start of the original campaign.
Mandate of Heaven	January 2020	Adds a prequel campaign starting in 182 that can continue into the base campaign, depicting the Yellow Turban Rebellion.
A World Betrayed	March 2020	Adds a new campaign starting in 194 after the main campaign of the original game.
The Furious Wild	September 2020	Expands the campaign map in the southwest and adds Nanman factions.
Fates Divided	March 2021	Adds a new campaign starting in 200 that focuses on the Battle of Guandu.

Free DLC
Name	Release date	Description
Tao Qian	January 2020	Adds the leader Tao Qian and a new faction mechanic Displaced Population
White Tiger Yan	March 2020	Adds the leader Yan Baihu with the unique faction mechanics Shanyue Camps and White Tiger Confederation
Shi Xie	September 2020	Adds the leader Shi Xie with the unique faction mechanic Splendor

== Reception ==
=== Critical reception ===
Reception

Aggregate score
Aggregator	Score
Metacritic	85/100

Review scores
Publication	Score
Eurogamer	Recommended
Game Informer	8.5/10
GameSpot	8.0/10
IGN	9.3/10
PC Gamer (US)	78/100
PCGamesN	7/10
The Guardian	4/5
GamerSky	9/10

Awards
Publication	Award
Rock, Paper, Shotgun	RPS Bestest Bests
PC Gamer	Best Strategy 2019

Total War: Three Kingdoms received positive reviews from critics, with many specifically praising the character-driven gameplay mechanics and storytelling elements. Chris Wray of wccftech describes the game is "as close to flawless, with a fantastic balance of 4X strategy and character-focused development and emergent storytelling." IGN's TJ Hafer stated that Three Kingdoms should serve as the example for all games of its genre going forward. Edwin Evans-Thirlwell of The Guardian stated the game "...is a wonderfully torrid period epic that understands the greatest stories are written about people, not empires." Jody Macgregor of PC Gamer praised the campaign elements, but found the game still could not break off from longstanding problems the series has always faced, claiming Three Kingdoms "is not the best Total War game but not the worst by a long shot."

The Romance mode has also been praised as bringing fascinating additions to the game, with many reviewers comparing it to Total War: Warhammer. Preston Dozsa of CGMagazine stated that the game "represents the best of both the historical and fantasy sides of the franchise." Sean Martin from Hooked Gamers stated the game "is the most divergent Total War I’ve seen since Total War: Warhammer... taking what is good in fantasy and using it to complement the historical components of the game." Denis Ryan of Rock, Paper, Shotgun said it draws inspiration from many games that Creative Assembly developed in the past, and "despite the resemblance there really is no game which has quite the same combination of elements, nor is there any strategy game that looks this good."

Chris Tapsell of Eurogamer also stated that the game is "ambitious and sometimes overwhelming." PCGamesN's Phil Iwaniuk said the game brings issues along with innovations, and noted that despite the memorable campaign, the real-time battles portion lacks depth compared to rest of the series.

Beifang Lin of GamerSky, a Chinese publication, commended the development team for their professionalism and deep understanding of the historical era, concluding that the Three Kingdoms theme was well integrated into the Total War system.

=== Sales ===
According to the developer Creative Assembly, Total War: Three Kingdoms was the most pre-ordered Total War game until its release date. The game also set the record of concurrent players for Total War series, with over 160,000 people playing simultaneously on the day of release and reaching 192,000 by the first weekend. This made it the largest concurrent played strategy game on Steam. It became the fastest-selling game in the history of the franchise, selling one million copies in a week since its initial release and amassed a total of 3,210,000 units sold as of March 2025.

=== Awards ===
Year	Award	Category	Result	Ref.
2018	Game Critics Awards	Best Strategy Game	Won	
2018	Gamescom	Best Strategy Game	Won	
2019	2019 Golden Joystick Awards	PC Game of the Year	Nominated	
2019	The Game Awards 2019	Best Strategy Game	Nominated	
2020	23rd Annual D.I.C.E. Awards	Strategy/Simulation Game of the Year	Nominated	
2020	NAVGTR Awards	Art Direction, Period Influence	Nominated	
2020	NAVGTR Awards	Engineering	Nominated	
2020	NAVGTR Awards	Game, Strategy	Nominated	
2020	NAVGTR Awards	Original Dramatic Score, Franchise	Nominated	
2020	MCV/Develop Awards	Audio Innovation of the Year	Won	
2020	16th British Academy Games Awards	British Game	Nominated	

== Official website ==
- Official website
