= Total War: Warhammer III =

2022 video game

- Developer: Creative Assembly
- Publisher: Sega
- Director: Ian Roxburgh
- Writer: Andy Hall
- Series: Total War; Warhammer Fantasy
- Platforms: Linux; macOS; Windows
- Release: February 17, 2022
- Genres: Turn-based strategy, real-time tactics
- Modes: Single-player, multiplayer

Total War: Warhammer III is a turn-based strategy and real-time tactics video game developed by Creative Assembly and published by Sega. It is part of the Total War series, and the third to be set in Games Workshop's Warhammer Fantasy fictional universe (following 2016's Total War: Warhammer and 2017's Total War: Warhammer II). The game was announced on 3 February 2021 and was released on 17 February 2022. It received positive reviews from critics and was nominated for the British Academy Games Award for British Game at the 19th British Academy Games Awards.

== Gameplay ==
Like its predecessors, Total War: Warhammer III features turn-based strategy and real-time tactics gameplay similar to other games in the Total War series.

In the campaign, players move armies and characters around the map and manage settlements in a turn-based manner. Players engage in diplomacy with, and fight against, AI-controlled factions. When armies meet, they battle in real time. The game has a custom battles mode where players can create customised real-time battles, as well as online multiplayer battles. Those who own races from the first two games have the same races unlocked for multiplayer in the third game; a combined world map, named "Immortal Empires", similar to the "Mortal Empires" campaign in Total War: Warhammer II for owners of the first two games. Immortal Empires released as a Beta on 23 August 2022 with patch 2.0.

The races in the game are the human civilizations of Grand Cathay (based on Imperial China) and Kislev (influenced by pop-culture stereotypes about Slavic nations), and five Chaos factions - four devoted to each of the Chaos Gods (Khorne, Tzeentch, Nurgle, and Slaanesh), and the Daemons of Chaos, led by a Daemon Prince that can be customized by earning "Daemonic Glory" through the course of the campaign. Another race, the Ogre Kingdoms, was made available to "early adopters" (those who pre-purchased the game before release, or purchased within the first week after release).

The main campaign takes place from the mysterious Lands of the East to the daemon-infested Realms of Chaos, said to be the source of all magic in the Warhammer Fantasy setting. Game director Ian Roxburgh has said the campaign map is "twice the size" of the Eye of the Vortex campaign map that appeared in Total War: Warhammer II.

== Plot ==
=== Prologue ===
During the end of winter in Kislev, Ursun, the Bear-God, would break winter with his roar and bring forth summer. For seven years, however, Ursun has stayed silent, and Kislev has suffered an unending winter. The Barkov brothers, Yuri and Gerik, are sent by Tzarina Katarin on an expedition north to search for the missing god. During prayer, Yuri hears Ursun's voice, claiming that he's been imprisoned in the Howling Citadel, in the Chaos Wastes.

Yuri marches his army north, into the Chaos Wastes, but is slowly corrupted by Chaos as his methods to reach Ursun's prison grow more ruthless, culminating in him murdering his brother Gerik and offering his skull to a Greater Daemon of Khorne to build a bridge of skulls to reach the Howling Citadel. After defeating a chaos-corrupted Boyar and his forces guarding the citadel's entrance, Yuri enters a portal to the Realm of Chaos.

After emerging from the portal, Yuri finds the imprisoned Ursun, and is greeted by Be'lakor (voiced by Richard Armitage), the first of the Daemon Princes. Be'lakor reveals that it was he who guided Yuri by mimicking Ursun's voice. Ursun begs Yuri to free him, but Be'lakor manipulates Yuri into thinking that Ursun is weak and unworthy of his worship, tempting him to kill the god and take his power for himself. Yuri renounces Ursun and shoots a Chaos-imbued bullet into the Bear-God's heart, and Ursun roars in pain. The resulting backlash hurls a gravely injured Yuri back to the material plane. Dying, Yuri offers his soul to the Chaos Gods and begs them to save him. The Chaos Gods answer his plea and ascend him into a Daemon Prince.

=== The Realm of Chaos ===
After the events of the prologue, Be'lakor has imprisoned the wounded Ursun in the Forge of Souls within the Realm of Chaos. Despising the Chaos Gods for taking away his power and physical form, Be'lakor plans to use Ursun's power to take his revenge. Ursun's pained roars have torn the fabric of reality, opening rifts between the material world and the Realm of Chaos and creating a maelstrom that has stranded Daemons in the mortal plane.

A character known as the Advisor (who provided the tutorials in the previous two games) has been enslaved by a corrupted book known as the Tome of Fates, bearing a curse of the Chaos God Tzeentch. He is able to use the book to offer counsel to others, but never for his own gain; however, he has learned that he can free himself from the book with a single drop of Ursun's blood. He goes to several factions seeking allies to achieve his goals, offering to guide them into the Realm of Chaos to find Ursun:

The rulers of the Tzardom of Kislev wish to free their god and put an end to the eternal winter that scours their land, though tensions are fraught between the Ice Court, led by Tzarina Katarin Bokha and her secret society of Ice Witches, and the Great Orthodoxy, led by Supreme Patriarch Kostaltyn, who believes Katarin to be an unworthy ruler, too focused on magic and politics instead of devotion. During the campaign, controlling the three main Kislevite cities (Kislev, Praag and Erengrad) allows either faction to rescue and awaken Katarin's father Boris Ursus, the Red Tzar and High Priest of Ursun, from his icy slumber in the Frozen Falls, unlocking Boris and his faction, the Ursun Revivalists, as a playable faction for future campaigns.

The dragon siblings of Grand Cathay, Miao Ying the Storm Dragon (who controls the Northern Provinces) and Zhao Ming the Iron Dragon (who controls the Western Provinces), are unconcerned about Ursun's fate, believing themselves older and wiser than any god, though they are still convinced to free him, as the Bear-God is the only one who knows the whereabouts of their missing sister Shen-Zoo, who disappeared in Norsca long before.

The greedy, gluttonous Ogres of the Ogre Kingdoms in the Mountains of Mourn, led by the Overtyrant Greasus Goldtooth and the Prophet of the Great Maw, Skrag the Slaughterer, care little for the politics and conflict between Order and Chaos, but still desire to reach Ursun to feast on his divine flesh, and feed the remainders to their own god, the ravenous, eldritch entity known as the Great Maw.

The Daemons of Chaos each have their desires for Ursun. Skarbrand the Exiled One, greatest of all Bloodthirsters, wants Ursun's skull so he can gift it to Khorne, the Chaos God of Blood and War, in order to earn forgiveness for his betrayal in the past. Kairos Fateweaver, the two-headed Lord of Change and Oracle of Tzeentch, the Chaos God of Sorcery and Deception, plans to take Ursun's eyes to be able to see the present, as he can only perceive the past and future. Ku'Gath Plaguefather, greatest of the Great Unclean Ones of Nurgle, the Chaos God of Disease and Decay, wants to use Ursun's corpse to brew a great plague known as a God-Pox. N'kari the Arch-Tempter, most favoured of the Keepers of Secrets of Slaanesh, the Chaos God of Excess and Desire, wishes to delight in Ursun's eternal sorrow. Yuri Barkov, now a Daemon Prince known as the God-Slayer and leading the Daemons of Chaos Undivided, seeks to finish what he started by truly slaying Ursun and taking revenge on Be'lakor for his manipulations.

In order to reach the Forge of Souls where Ursun is imprisoned, each faction must travel to the Realm of Chaos, invade each of the four Chaos Gods' domains and capture the soul of a Daemon Prince bound to them. As the factions battle for the Daemon Princes' souls, it is revealed that Be'lakor intends to absorb Ursun's divine power once he dies to transform himself into the Chaos God of Shadows. With an army of Soul Grinders created in the Forge of Souls, he will destroy the four Chaos Gods and rule unchallenged.

Once all four souls of the Daemon Princes have been captured, Ursun finally dies. As Be'lakor undergoes his ascension to godhood, the Advisor uses the souls of the Daemon Princes to create a bridge leading to the Forge of Souls. The player's faction battles Be'lakor's army before finally slaying the Dark Master and preventing his ascension. After the final battle, the fate of Ursun and the player's faction is revealed:

- The leaders of Kislev mourn the loss of Ursun, believing that with their god dead, Kislev will fall. However, Ursun is revived by their devotion, and with his roar, he puts an end to Kislev's endless winter. Tzarina Katarin's final victory is considered the canonical ending.
- The dragon siblings of Cathay use spirit magic to speak to Ursun, and before fading from existence, he clues them to the location of their missing sister.
- The Ogres butcher and feast on Ursun's carcass, and feed its remains to their deity, the Great Maw, briefly quelling its eternal, gnawing hunger.
- Skarbrand delivers the Bear-God's skull to Khorne. Whilst the Blood God revels in such a worthy offering, he does not forgive Skarbrand for his betrayal, rendering Skarbrand's efforts in vain.
- Kairos takes Ursun's eyes, and with the sight of a god he is finally capable of viewing the past, present and future.
- Ku'Gath uses Ursun's corpse as the final ingredient to brew the ultimate plague, a God-Pox capable of infecting the gods themselves.
- N'kari captures the last remains of Ursun's spirit, basking in the god's anguish at Kislev's demise.
- The God-Slayer takes what power remains from Ursun's corpse, allowing him to ascend to godhood and becoming Kislev's new tyrannical ruler.

The epilogue has the Advisor freed of his slavery from the Tome of Fates, and he is joined by a white crow. However, when he attempts to read the book, his sight is stolen, and the white crow is revealed to be a Greater Daemon of Tzeentch, known as Sarthorael the Everwatcher, with the Daemon binding the Advisor to his service. The epilogue also reveals that the game takes place before the events of the first game. A postscript after the completion of the story, should the player elect to continue playing on the campaign map, reveals that Be'lakor was resurrected by Tzeentch and given physical form again, but placed into the service of those who killed him; the player is given the option to use Be'lakor in their own army.

=== Champions of Chaos ===
For millennia, the servants of the Chaos Gods have clashed in the ancient city of Zanbaijin, the souls of the fallen in these conflicts sealed within the Altar of Battle at the city's heart. Ursun's roars have weakened the seal of the Altar of Battle, exposing the warrior-souls within. Acquiring these souls could change the balance of power between the four Chaos Gods. Consequently, each god commands one of their champions to reach the city of Zanbaijin.

Azazel, the debauched Prince of Damnation, who was once a follower of Sigmar until he betrayed his lord and pledged loyalty to Slaanesh, leads the Ecstatic Legions. Festus the Leechlord, a demented Imperial physician cursed by Nurgle with knowledge of all diseases and their cures, leads the Fecundites. Vilitch the Curseling, a wretched sorcerer fused by Tzeentch to the hulking body of his warrior twin Thomin, leads the Puppets of Misrule. Valkia the Bloody, a warrior queen ascended by Khorne as his chosen consort, leads the Legion of the Gorequeen. These champions will force open the still-healing scars created by Ursun's roar to forge a path towards the Fallen City, where they will shatter the seal on the Altar of Battles and claim the souls within for their patron god.

The final battle for the Altar pits the player's chosen champion against the other three. However, when the last champion is defeated, the player confronted by Archaon the Everchosen, who seeks to prevent the player champion's god from gaining primacy over the others and disrupting his effort to bring about the End Times. Once the player defeats Archaon, the ritual is completed and the souls are claimed, making their patron deity ascendant.

=== Forge of the Chaos Dwarfs ===
For millennia, the Dawi-Zharr, or Chaos Dwarfs, have dug beneath the mountains of the Dark Lands, seeking the mysterious Blood of Hashut, a substance of unfathomable power said to be pure magic in liquid form. When a small vein of the substance is discovered in the depths of the deepest mines, the Chaos Dwarfs, eager to reach the source of the Daemonic substance, commune with their malign deity, Hashut the Father of Darkness, who commands them to construct a massive mechanical drill capable of boring through the bedrock of the world and reach his divine domain.

Three of the most powerful Chaos Dwarfs vie to be the first to construct the drill and claim the Blood of Hashut: Astragoth Ironhand, oldest and most powerful of the Sorcerer-Prophets of Hashut, whose body has slowly succumbed to the petrification that curses all Chaos Dwarf sorcerers, and now uses a mechanical harness for mobility, leading the Disciples of Hashut; Drazoath the Ashen, the master of the Black Fortress, once a prominent Daemonsmith until he was exiled from Zharr-Naggrund and who longs to return to the capital and retake his place, leading the Legion of Azgorh; and Zhatan the Black, the ruthless commander of the Tower of Zharr and chief general and enforcer of the Sorcerer-Prophet Ghorth the Cruel, legendary among the Chaos Dwarfs for his cruelty and the vast amounts of slaves he routinely delivers to his master's workshops and forges, leading the Warhost of Zharr.

However, the Blood of Hashut lies not only in the darkest depths of the world, but beyond the foundations of reality itself, where no mortal engine can reach. Thus, the drill must be strengthened by dark sorceries, via four ancient Dwarfen relics corrupted in the forges of the Daemonsmiths. As the relics are found, however, their profanation will anger the Dwarfs of the West, who will send vengeful armies against their estranged kin. Once the drill is ready to begin its excavation, a massive Dwarfen army, commanded by High King Thorgrim Grudgebearer, Belegar Ironhammer and Grombrindal the White Dwarf, arrives to stop the Chaos Dwarfs; at the same time, the drill's breaching of the veil of reality opens rifts to the Chaos Realms, spewing forth Chaos Daemons that also attack the Dawi-Zharr.

Once the player wins the final battle, the drill successfully bores into Hashut's domain, ensuring an inexhaustible supply of the Blood of Hashut. With their sorceries and machinery powered by the powerful substance, the Chaos Dwarfs stand ready to dominate the world.

== Downloadable content ==
Creative Assembly intends to release several paid and free DLC packs for the game, which expand its content. A free update for owners of Total War: Warhammer and Total War: Warhammer II named Immortal Empires was released in August 2022. It provides a massive campaign map that combines the maps and playable races of all three Total War: Warhammer games.

Certain legendary lords from the previous titles receive their own factions for the Immortal Empires campaign: Grombrindal the White Dwarf (The Ancestral Throng) for the Dwarfs, Helman Ghorst (Caravan of Blue Roses) for the Vampire Counts, Volkmar the Grim (Cult of Sigmar) for the Empire, and Archaon the Everchosen (Warhost of the Apocalypse), Sigvald the Magnificent (The Decadent Host) and Kholek Suneater (Heralds of the Tempest) for the Warriors of Chaos. Vlad and Isabella von Carstein, initially released separately in previous titles, are included together as part of the Sylvania (formerly Von Carstein) faction for the Vampire Counts; if the player chooses Vlad, Isabella is automatically unlocked as a hero (secondary leader), and vice versa. Be'lakor, the antagonist in the main story campaign, was also included as a playable legendary lord for the Warriors of Chaos with his own faction, the Shadow Legion.

Gotrek and Felix were originally added as a temporary legendary lord and hero in Total War: Warhammer II, where they would depart after 30 turns. In the Thrones of Decay update in April 2024, they became permanent legendary heroes with full skill trees, that can be recruited through a specific quest by Empire, Dwarf, Bretonnia, Kislev, and Grand Cathay factions.

Paid DLC
Name	Release date	Description
Ogre Kingdoms	February 2022	Adds the Ogre Kingdoms as a playable race in campaign and multiplayer, with two legendary lords: Greasus Goldtooth leading the Goldtooth faction, and Skrag the Slaughterer leading the Disciples of the Maw faction. Free for players who pre-ordered or purchased the game the first week after release.
Champions of Chaos	August 2022	Adds four new Warriors of Chaos legendary lords: Azazel, Prince of Damnation, leading the Ecstatic Legions faction, Festus the Leechlord leading the Fecundites faction, Vilitch the Curseling leading the Puppets of Misrule faction, and Valkia the Bloody leading the Legion of the Gorequeen faction, as well as new units, Regiments of Renown and mechanics.
Blood for the Blood God III	August 2022	Adds various blood and gore effects in battle. Free for players who own either of the previous editions from the first two games.
Forge of the Chaos Dwarfs	April 2023	Adds the Chaos Dwarfs as a playable race in campaign and multiplayer, with three legendary lords: Astragoth Ironhand leading the Disciples of Hashut faction, Drazhoath the Ashen leading the Legion of Azgorh faction, and Zhathan the Black leading the Warhost of Zharr faction, and a legendary hero, Gorduz Backstabber.
Shadows of Change	August 2023	Adds three new legendary lords: The Changeling for Tzeentch, leading the Deceivers faction; Yuan Bo the Jade Dragon for Grand Cathay, leading the Jade Court faction; and Mother Ostankya for Kislev, leading the Daughters of the Forest faction; as well as a legendary hero, the Blue Scribes, for Tzeentch, and new units, Regiments of Renown and mechanics. A later, free update added new units and two new legendary heroes: Naryska Leysa the Golden Knight for Kislev, and Saytang the Watcher for Grand Cathay, and allowed the DLC to be purchased either as a complete pack, including all three races, or in the form of smaller DLC packs containing only the content for each individual race.
Thrones of Decay	April 2024	Adds three new legendary lords and heroes: Elspeth Von Draken, leading the Wissenland & Nuln faction, and Theodore Bruckner for The Empire; Tamurkhan, leading the Maggot Host faction, and Kayzk the Befouled for Nurgle;and Malakai Makaisson, leading the Masters of Innovation faction, and Garagrim Ironfist for the Dwarfs; as well as new units, Regiments of Renown and mechanics. This DLC can be purchased either as a complete pack, including all three races, or in the form of smaller DLC packs containing only the content for each individual race.
Omens of Destruction	December 2024	Adds three new legendary lords and four new legendary heroes: Skulltaker, leading the Blooded Wanderers faction, Skarr Bloodwrath and Scylla Anfigrimm for Khorne; Gorbad Ironclaw, leading the Ironclaw Orcs faction, and Snagla Grobspit for the Greenskins; and Golgfag Maneater, leading the Maneaters faction, and Bragg the Gutsman for the Ogre Kingdoms; as well as new units, Regiments of Renown and mechanics. This DLC can be purchased either as a complete pack, including all three races, or in the form of smaller DLC packs containing only the content for each individual race.
Tides of Torment	December 2025	Adds three new legendary lords and heroes: Dechala the Denied One, leading the Tormentors faction, and Styrkaar of the Sortsvinaer for Slaanesh; Sayl the Faithless, leading the Dolgans faction, and Beorg Bearstruck for Norsca; and Sea Lord Aislinn, leading the High Elf Sea Patrol faction, and Caradryan for the High Elves; as well as new units, Regiments of Renown and mechanics. This DLC can be purchased either as a complete pack, including all three races, or in the form of smaller DLC packs containing only the content for each individual race.
Bhashiva & The Tiger Warriors	May 2026	Adds Bhashiva the White Tiger as a new Grand Cathay legendary lord, leading the Claws of the White Tiger faction; as well as new units and mechanics.
Lords of the End Times	September 2026	Adds the Undead Legions as a playable race in campaign and multiplayer, with one legendary lord: Nagash, leading the Host of Nagash faction, and two legendary heroes: Walach Harkon and Dieter Helsnicht. Also adds Boris Todbringer, leading the Middenland faction, and legendary hero Emil Valgeir for the Empire; The Glottkin, leading the Host of the Triplets faction, and legendary heroes Bloab Rotspawned, Gutrot Spume, Morbidex Twiceborn and Orghotts Daemonspew for the Warriors of Chaos; and Grey Seer Thanquol, leading the Clan Scruten faction, and legendary hero Skreech Verminking for the Skaven. This DLC can be purchased either as a complete pack, including all three races, or in the form of smaller DLC packs containing only the content for each individual race.

Free DLC
Name	Release date	Description
Mirror of Madness	April 2023	Adds two new game modes: Trials of Fate (a survival-based mini-campaign) and The Infinite Portal (creating unique battle situations by customizing settings).
Ulrika Magdova	April 2023	Adds Ulrika Magdova as a legendary hero for the Empire and Kislev.
Harald Hammerstorm	May 2023	Adds Harald Hammerstorm as a legendary hero for the Warriors of Chaos.
Aekold Helbrass	August 2023	Adds Aekold Helbrass as a legendary hero for Tzeentch.
Epidemius	April 2024	Adds Epidemius as a legendary lord for Nurgle, leading the Tallymen of Pestilence faction.
Karanak	May 2024	Adds Karanak as a legendary hero for Khorne.
Arbaal the Undefeated	December 2024	Adds Arbaal the Undefeated as a legendary lord for Khorne, leading the Challengers of Khorne faction.
The Masque of Slaanesh	December 2025	Adds The Masque of Slaanesh as a legendary lord for Slaanesh, leading the Accursed Troupe faction.
Taoyan the Merciless	May 2026	Adds Taoyan the Merciless as a legendary hero for Grand Cathay.
Neferata	September 2026	Adds Neferata as a legendary lord for the Vampire Counts, leading the Lahmian Sisterhood faction.

== Reception ==
Reception

Aggregate score
Aggregator	Score
Metacritic	86/100

Review scores
Publication	Score
GameSpot	6/10
GameStar	88/100
IGN	9/10
Jeuxvideo.com	17/20
PC Gamer (US)	90/100
PC Games (DE)	9/10
PCGamesN	9/10
Shacknews	9/10
The Games Machine (Italy)	9.5/10
The Guardian	5/5
VG247	4/5

Total War: Warhammer III received "generally favourable" reviews, according to review aggregator platform Metacritic.

Chris Tapsell of Eurogamer praised the game's tutorial and noted that the experience would be intimidating for new players because of the game's tendency to leave more intricate mechanics inadequately explained. He deemed the game to be a hectic and stressful yet fun and ultimately rewarding experience, and recommended it. Leana Hafer of IGN called the title a worthy capstone to the dark fantasy trilogy, praising its depth, quality of life improvements, alliances, and factions. Fraser Brown of PC Gamer praised the addition of new modes and features, namely the Daemons of Chaos, and noted that the tutorial in the game was "the best tutorial Creative Assembly has put together". Shacknews similarly praised the new campaigns, races, customization, art presentation, and setting, and cited the lack of DLSS and platter drive load times as minor issues.

PCGamesN liked the new campaign, saying it was an improvement over Warhammer II's because of a more interesting endgame: "It's so much better than Warhammer II's Vortex campaign... But because the winner in Warhammer II was whomever accrued the most ritual currency, their victory often felt just as inevitable as ever once they emerged from the pack". Despite liking the new tutorial and the "intense, breathless campaign", The Guardian criticised the harsher auto-resolve as making the title more repetitive, "a harsher autoresolve and tighter map means a tiresome number of forced manual battles". Rock Paper Shotgun enjoyed the demonic realms the player had to fight through: "The realms only become accessible during magical mega-storms, occurring intermittently through the campaign, during which loads of portals appear on the map, corrupting the landscape and blopping out armies of devils... they give the same sense of apocalyptic desperation as the buildup to the endgame in Frostpunk".

Following the release of the Shadows of Change DLC in August 2023, Creative Assembly was criticized for the DLC's high price relative to the amount of content offered in comparison with previous DLCs. On Steam, Shadows of Change, featuring three legendary lords, cost £20 upon release while DLCs for the previous entry, Total War: Warhammer II, typically featured two new legendary lords each and cost £8. This controversy led to a wave of negative reviews for the main game on the Steam. In response, Creative Assembly released a statement on its website, citing increasing costs for the price increase. However in December 2023, a new statement was released wherein the company acknowledged that the DLC failed to meet expectations and announced a free, major update for Shadows of Change that was subsequently released on February 21, 2024, including new units and legendary heroes (Naryska Leysa, the Golden Knight for Kislev and Saytang the Watcher for Grand Cathay). Additionally, Shadows of Change has now been updated to allow players to buy lords individually, as is the case in Thrones of Decay and Omens of Destruction.

The game has amassed a total of 2,340,000 units sold by March 2025.
