= Total War: Attila =

2015 video game

- Developer: Creative Assembly
- Publisher: Sega
- Directors: Mike Simpson; János Gáspár
- Composer: Richard Beddow
- Series: Total War
- Engine: Warscape
- Platforms: OS X, Windows, Linux
- Release: OS X & Windows: WW: 17 February 2015; Linux: WW: 10 December 2015
- Genres: Real-time strategy, turn based strategy
- Modes: Single-player, multiplayer

Total War: Attila is a strategy video game developed by Creative Assembly and published by Sega, released on 17 February 2015 for OS X, Windows, and Linux, as well as Mac OS later on after release. It is the ninth standalone game in the Total War series.

The game begins in 395 AD, during what is now called Late Antiquity (the transition period from Classical Rome to the Middle Ages in European history). The main theme of the game is the Migration Period which took place between 300-800 AD. The title character does not exist in the beginning of the campaign, although he becomes available to play after he becomes the leader of the Huns in mid-game.

== Gameplay ==
=== Campaign map ===
The campaign map for Total War: Attila spans from Bactria to Lusitania and from Caledonia to Garamantia in the Sahara. Provinces are groupings of three regions, and each region within a province can be conquered separately. The number of cities and regions is different from Total War: Rome II, but the size of the map is similar. The map of Total War: Attila further extends into modern-day Russia in lieu of the eastern provinces of the Hindu Kush found in Total War: Rome II, shifting the player's attention to the nomadic Huns. The largest settlement in a province is designated as the province capital. These province capitals have more building slots than the other settlements and are also walled at the start of the game, though in a change from Rome II the small settlements can eventually be upgraded to have walls.

=== Historical setting of Roman factions ===
At the dawn of the Dark Ages the Roman Empire descends into chaos due to volcanic changes rocking the empire as apocalyptic signs foretell of a great scourge to sweep across Europe. Upon the death of Emperor Theodosius I in 395 AD, the empire is divided between his sons who each rule a half: Honorius in the West, and Arcadius in the East. Since the days of Diocletian it has become a custom to divide Rome as the pressures to govern the empire have become too much for a single emperor to handle. With the split of the empire both sides face multiple threats on all sides, including internal instability undermining each of the young emperors' control as part of the long-term repercussions of the Third-Century Crisis. When the game begins, playing as the Western Roman Empire, players will face waves of hordes entering their borders as the arrival of the Huns in the east and the devastation they have caused have forced them to flee in search of new homes. Since the death of Emperor Valentinian I and the division of the empire, the weaknesses in the West have rapidly begun to show and edge the empire closer to ruin. With depleted funds from centuries of internal mismanagement and corruption, the West is unable to muster an effective army to combat the invaders. While players will start the campaign with vast territories under their command, it will quickly become a game of survival as Rome's legions are stretched to breaking point to protect a decaying empire. The Eastern Roman Empire, however, has profited from the division to take control of the civilized world as it begins its transformation into a new empire. With the new administrative capital in Constantinople serving as the gateway for trade between Europe and Asia, along with economic reforms, the eastern empire has become an economic powerhouse in the game. Yet, the Eastern Romans face an initial threat from the Visigoths led by Alaric I in Greece, who makes a direct assault on Constantinople itself, and remain wary of the Sassanid threat in the East. The Romans must find new ways and technologies to cope with this changing world if they are to survive as the old technologies and antiquity systems no longer apply, along with the increasingly growing power of the Church becoming ever more influential. If players choose to play either of the Roman empires, they will be tasked with saving and preserving the once-great empire, and if possible unite Rome under a single emperor.

=== Features ===
As Total War: Attila embraces an era of great change with the people of Europe migrating across the campaign map, Attila adds a new dimension in the form of a faction's religious conversion in the game that brings an array of unique benefits across the player's empire depending on the religion that they choose to favour. The presence of a faction's state religion offers bonuses, including provincial edicts assigned, temple buildings, churches, and even character traits. These factors all play an important role in how dominant the player's religion is over a province. If a province has a population with several religions, it can have a negative effect on public order and thus lead to revolts. Factions also suffer or gain religious penalties when engaging in diplomacy with each other depending on their chosen religious affinity. Should the player choose to convert to a new religion, their faction's overall population must have at least 35% of that religion to convert. To find which religion is dominant in a region, the campaign map may be searched using the religion filter provided. For players who choose Christianity as their state religion, the five cities of Rome, Constantinople, Aelia Capitolina, Antioch, and Alexandria that formed part of the Pentarchy have the exclusive option for their churches to be upgraded to "Holy See" status, which comes with major bonuses. The game includes a total of 13 religions available throughout the campaign map, although the effects of minor religions are not fully understood.

The game also introduces the ability for players to use their armies to raze settlements once they have been conquered. This new feature allows the player to enact a "Scorched Earth policy" which destroys the land around the nearby settlement, crippling the enemy's food and money supply. Attila also lets a faction who did not originally begin the campaign as a horde to abandon its settlements at the cost of burning those former settlements or simply abandon a chosen number of cities which before being destroyed, will provide a small amount of wealth to the treasury. However, it is advised to analyze which settlements players destroy; recolonizing it would cost a faction a hefty amount of gold, a separate cost from building expenses to reach its former state.

Based on historical accounts, a mini Ice Age in this period plays a part for the people of Northern Europe to move to the more fertile south as the winter cold moves further down and engulfs Europe in longer winters as the game progresses. As an added new feature included in Attila, the Fertility of a region plays a crucial part when settling in a region if playing as a migrating horde or creating important buildings that deliver food throughout your empire. The campaign map is divided on various fertility levels that are color-coded and labeled; from highest-lowest: Rich, Good, Average, Poor, Meagre, Infertile. The greater the fertility level, the greater the amount of food can be cultivated with the appropriate buildings. However, the amount of food harvested is affected by a number of various external and internal factors. These include: building consumption costs, razed areas within your controlled province, provincial edicts, character traits, foreign armies raiding within your borders.

The game features 56 factions, 40 of which are unplayable. Each faction has their own unit roster and agenda. Ten factions are playable in the game at launch, with others added via downloadable content (DLC) packs.

== Downloadable content and Mods ==
The first DLC faction pack, "Viking Forefathers", was released on 17 February 2015, adding three new playable factions: the Danes, the Jutes and the Geats. The second, "Longbeards", was released on 4 March 2015 adding a further three factions: the Langobards, the Alamans, and the Burgundians, as well as introducing a new narrative chain, "Lay Of Ybor", which when completed unlocks the titular Ybor as general, with traits tailored by the story.

A third faction pack was released on 25 March that contains three Celtic factions: the Picts, Ebdanians, and Caledonians.

On 29 April 2015, The Creative Assembly released Assembly Kits on Steam, which is a pack that features modification or "mod" tools that allow players to create, edit, process or customize campaign maps, database entries and textures as well as other features.

On 25 June 2015, The Creative Assembly released its first campaign pack, titled the Last Roman. The Campaign focuses on the Wars of Justinian I in the former Western Roman Empire as he sends a Roman Expeditionary force led by his general Belisarius to reclaim the western provinces from the various Barbarian kingdoms that have torn it apart. However, the prospect of rebuilding the Western Empire may influence men to make other agendas such as becoming emperor themselves which is made possible in the campaign once a settlement has been taken. The campaign is unique in that the Expedition functions as a horde using Roman units, and that any captured settlements are controlled by the Emperor unless the general declares independence. It also allows you to play as the Visigoths, the Ostrogoths, the Franks or the Vandals. In addition, the Campaign Pack also includes the Historical Battle of Dara. A free DLC pack, released the same day made the Suebians playable in the Grand Campaign as well.

A fourth faction pack, titled "Empires of Sand" was released on 15 September 2015. This pack adds three new playable factions: the Tanukhids, Himyar, and Aksum. Along with it, 3 new religions were introduced into the game each with their own benefits: Eastern Christianity, Judaism, and Semitic Paganism. A Free DLC pack, was released the same day and added the Lakhmids as well.

A second campaign pack, titled Age of Charlemagne was released on 10 December 2015. It is set in the early Medieval Age and features new units and a new campaign that stretches from modern-day Portugal to Western Romania and from Scotland to Sicily. It is in this period from which the medieval kingdoms begin to form. The campaign begins in 768 A.D., depicting Charlemagne's rise to power as the King of the Franks with his brother Carloman I, later becoming the first since Imperial Rome to unite most of Western Europe under a single ruler with the title of Holy Roman Emperor. After centuries of warfare, a leader must rise to bring peace to an entire continent. In addition, a free DLC pack was released the same day making the White Huns playable in the Grand Campaign.

On 25 February 2016 a fifth faction pack was released entitled "Slavic Nations" along with a free DLC that includes the Garamantians as a free faction. These nations have been tipped to be the "world's best hope to defeat the Huns". This new pack includes the Anteans, Sclavenians, and the Venedians each with settlements in the nearby proximity of the Hunnic Hordes advancing into Western Europe. Each faction enters the game with a formidable cultural trait including immunity to snow attrition and becoming the only factions to recolonize razed settlements for no cost.

=== Mods ===
Aside from the official expansion packs and DLCs, third-party mods are available on sites such as the Steam Workshop.

Some popular mods extensively change the game, adding historical flavor, fantasy scenarios, or new game mechanics. At the same time, some modders have managed to modify the game's map.

Modders have produced several accuracy and realism mods, as well total conversion mods such as:

- The Dawnless Days (previously "Rise of Mordor: Total War"), based on J.R.R. Tolkien's The Lord of the Rings fantasy novels, released in March 2018.
- Medieval Kingdoms 1212 AD is one of the most popular mods for Total War: Attila and brings the game to Middle Ages, introducing dozens of factions. It is considered as an unofficial sequel to Medieval 2: Total War.
- Fall of the Eagles overhauls the game extensively, adding new unit reskins and improves some game mechanics.
- The Seven Kingdoms, based on George R. R. Martin's A Song of Ice and Fire fantasy novels.

== Reception ==
Reception

Aggregate score
Aggregator	Score
Metacritic	80/100

Review scores
Publication	Score
Destructoid	6.5/10
GameRevolution	4/5
GameSpot	7/10
GamesRadar+	4/5
IGN	8.1/10
PC Gamer (US)	83/100
Polygon	8/10
Hardcore Gamer	4/5

Total War: Attila received "generally favorable" reviews, according to review aggregator Metacritic.

Dan Griliopoulos from PC Gamer gave the game 83/100, praising the in-game representation of history, enjoyable multiplayer, stunning music, animation and sound-effect, improved army and character management as well as the themes, which he stated "has reflected the era accurately" and the new family system, which adds new complexity into the game. He also praised the developer for fixing the long-term problems in the series. However, he criticized the extreme difficulty, AI problem, laggy chat in multiplayer, frame rate issues and bugs. He concluded the game by saying that "[Total War: Attila] is a barbarous twist on Rome II, with a handful of fixes. The Total War games still need work to reach that perfection they’re aiming for, and the bugs this close to release are worrying, but Attila shows that Creative have been listening."

TJ Hafer from IGN gave the game 8.1/10, praising its dynamic campaign, AI, improved interface, siege battles and utilities, new army types, and enhanced pacing in the real-time battle, which he stated "adds an extra layer to the choice of army composition". He also stated that the game helped people understand "the perspective of these ancient people, notorious for raiding and pillaging." However, he criticized the game for its impenetrable, non-user-friendly and frustrating internal politics and diplomacy, occasionally nonsensical AI and the disappointing Celtic factions, which were a non-playable and lacked their own roster or models in the game's initial release. He stated that "'Total War: Attila' is a cleaner, better thought-out experience, It is an adept refinement of Rome 2 instead of a glorified expansion pack for its predecessor. In fact, Attila is proudly its own game, and puts a firm foot forward in contrast to Rome 2's initially unsatisfying jumble."

Atlas Burke from GamesRadar praised the graphics, audio-design, and new additions. He stated "[New additions] seem to be direct responses to the Rome 2 backlash". He also praised the satisfying gameplay, outstanding tactical battles, improved AI and UI, the option to turn settlements into armies, and the heavy emphasis on political machinations. However, he criticized the excruciating build turn, technical issues, over-simplistic interface, and unbalanced units. He summarized the game by saying that "Total War: Attila is a damn fine strategy game in its own right, without having to compare it to its oft-lamented predecessor."

Writing for Destructoid, Greg Tito was slightly more negative about the game, giving the game 6.5/10. He praised the choice of setting and improvements to the real-time battles, but was less positive about the campaign side. He criticized the changes to the political system and issues with trade and diplomacy. He thought there was "a lot to like" in Total War: Attila, and that it "doesn't need to reinvent its formula each time," but "setting even a well-made sequel in the crumbling legacy of the once-mighty may not have been a good choice."
