= Total War (video game series) =

Computer strategy game series

- Genres: Turn-based strategy, real-time tactics
- Developers: Creative Assembly; Feral Interactive
- Publishers: Electronic Arts (2000–2001); Activision (2002–2004); Sega (2005–present)
- Platforms: Microsoft Windows, macOS, Linux, iOS, Android
- First release: Shogun: Total War; 13 June 2000
- Latest release: Total War: Pharaoh; 11 October 2023

Total War is a series of strategy games developed by British developer Creative Assembly for personal computers. They combine turn-based strategy and resource management with real-time tactical control of battles. Rather uniquely for real-time strategy games, flanking manoeuvres and formations factor heavily into gameplay. The first game of the series, Shogun: Total War, was released in June 2000. The most recent major game released was Total War: Pharaoh on 11 October 2023. As of April 2021, the series had sold over 36 million copies.

== Main games ==
Total War series
Title	Release date	Engine	Operating system(s)	Expansion(s)	Game collection(s)	Total War Eras	Total War Anthology	Total War Collection	Total War Grand Master Collection	Game Of The Year Edition
Shogun: Total War	2000	TW Engine 1	Windows	The Mongol Invasion	Warlord Edition, Gold Edition	Yes	Yes	No	No	No
Medieval: Total War	2002	TW Engine 1	Windows	Viking Invasion	Gold Edition, Battle Collection	Yes	Yes	No	No	No
Rome: Total War	2004, 2010 (macOS), 2016 (iOS), 2019 (Android)	TW Engine 2	Windows, macOS, Android, iOS	Barbarian Invasion, Alexander	Gold Edition, Rome: Total War Anthology	Yes	Yes	Yes	Yes	Yes
Medieval II: Total War	2006, 2015 (macOS), 2022 (Android, iOS)	TW Engine 2	Windows, macOS, Linux, Android, iOS	Kingdoms	Gold Edition, Collector's Edition, Definitive Edition	No	Yes	Yes	Yes	No
Empire: Total War	2009, 2012 (macOS), 2024 (Android, iOS)	TW Engine 3 (Warscape Engine) 32-bit	Windows, macOS, Linux, Android, iOS	The Warpath Campaign	Gold Edition, Special Forces Edition, Collector's Edition, Definitive Edition	No	Yes	Yes	Yes	Yes
Napoleon: Total War	2010, 2013 (macOS), 2025 (Android, iOS)	TW Engine 3 (Warscape Engine) 32-bit	Windows, macOS, Android, iOS	The Peninsular Campaign	Gold Edition, Limited Edition, Imperial Edition, Emperor's Edition, Definitive Edition	No	No	Yes	Yes	Yes
Total War: Shogun 2	2011, 2014 (macOS)	TW Engine 3 (Warscape Engine) 32-bit	Windows, macOS, Linux	Rise of the Samurai, Fall of the Samurai	Gold Edition, Collector's Edition	No	No	Yes	Yes	No
Total War: Rome II	2013	TW Engine 3 (Warscape Engine) 32-bit	Windows, macOS	Caesar in Gaul, Hannibal at the Gates, Imperator Augustus, Wrath of Sparta, Empire Divided, Rise of the Republic	Emperor Edition, Spartan Edition, Collector's Edition, Caesar Edition, Enemy at the Gates Edition	No	No	Yes	No	No
Total War: Attila	2015	TW Engine 3 (Warscape Engine) 32-bit	Windows, macOS, Linux	The Last Roman, Age of Charlemagne	Special Edition, Tyrants and Kings Edition	No	No	No	No	No
Total War: Warhammer	2016	TW Engine 3 (Warscape Engine) 64-bit	Windows, macOS, Linux	Chaos Warriors, Call of the Beastmen, Realm of the Wood Elves, Bretonnia, Norsca	Limited Edition, Old World Edition, High King Edition, Dark Gods Edition, Savage Edition	No	No	No	No	No
Total War: Warhammer II	2017	TW Engine 3 (Warscape Engine) 64-bit	Windows, macOS, Linux	Mortal Empires, Rise of the Tomb Kings, Curse of the Vampire Coast	Limited Edition, Serpent God Edition	No	No	No	No	No
Total War Saga: Thrones of Britannia	2018	TW Engine 3 (Warscape Engine) 64-bit	Windows, macOS, Linux		Limited Edition	No	No	No	No	No
Total War: Three Kingdoms	2019	TW Engine 3 (Warscape Engine) 64-bit	Windows, macOS, Linux	Eight Princes, Mandate of Heaven, A World Betrayed, The Furious Wild, Fates Divided	Limited Edition, Collector's Edition, Royal Edition	No	No	No	No	No
Total War Saga: Troy	2020	TW Engine 3 (Warscape Engine) 32 bit + 64 bit	Windows, macOS	Mythos	Limited Edition, Heroic Edition, Mythic Edition, Ultimate Edition	No	No	No	No	No
Total War: Warhammer III	2022	TW Engine 3 (Warscape Engine) 32 bit + 64 bit	Windows, macOS, Linux	Immortal Empires, Ogre Kingdoms, Forge of the Chaos Dwarfs		No	No	No	No	No
Total War: Pharaoh	2023	TW Engine 3 (Warscape Engine) 32 bit + 64 bit	Windows, macOS	Dynasties	Standard Edition	No	No	No	No	No
Total War: Warhammer 40,000	TBA	Warcore [?]	Windows, PlayStation 5, Xbox Series X/S	TBA	Standard Edition	No	No	No	No	No
Total War: Medieval III	TBA	Warcore [?]	Windows	TBA	Standard Edition	No	No	No	No	No

Release timeline
2000	Shogun: Total War
2001
2002	Medieval: Total War
2003
2004	Rome: Total War
2005
2006	Medieval II: Total War
2007
2008
2009	Empire: Total War
2010	Napoleon: Total War
2011	Total War: Shogun 2
2012
2013	Total War: Rome II
2014
2015	Total War: Attila
2016	Total War: Warhammer
2017	Total War: Warhammer II
2018	Total War Saga: Thrones of Britannia
2019	Total War: Three Kingdoms
2020	Total War Saga: Troy
2021
2022	Total War: Warhammer III
2023	Total War: Pharaoh

=== Shogun: Total War ===
Released in June 2000, Shogun: Total War is the first game in the series. The game is set in feudal Japan. The single-player game includes interactive videos that represented possible decisions by the player, such as converting to Christianity. The original Shogun was not a mainstream product, but attracted a dedicated fan base. An expansion pack, The Mongol Invasion, was released with the original in the Warlord Edition.

=== Medieval: Total War ===
Medieval: Total War was released in August 2002. Using the same game engine as Shogun, the game takes players to medieval Europe. The expansion pack is called Viking Invasion, and the combined edition is called the Battle Collection. It was one of the best-selling games in the Total War series.

=== Rome: Total War ===
Released in 2004, Rome: Total War is set in the Roman Republic. This was the first game to encompass what would become one of the most fundamental additions to the Total War series, free map movement as opposed to earlier versions where all movement was province-based. The game also featured the first 3D map. The first expansion pack, Barbarian Invasion, was released on 27 September 2005. Rome: Total War Gold Edition, which combined the fully patched versions of the original game and its first expansion into one DVD (instead of the original game's three CD-ROMs), was released on 14 February 2006. A CD-ROM version (a total of four CDs) was also produced. A Mac version of Rome: Total War Gold Edition, developed by Feral Interactive, was released 12 February 2010. A second expansion pack, Rome: Total War: Alexander, was released on 19 June 2006. A compilation of the original game and the two expansions, Rome: Total War Anthology, was released on 16 March 2007. The series has also spawned several popular mods such as Europa Barbarorum and Rome: Total Realism each of which seeks to create more historically accurate settings. This game was also added to mobile, offering a simplified version of the original game. Rome: Total War has won many strategy gaming awards for its realistic campaign and battlefield animation and interface. Total War: Rome Remastered was released on 29 April 2021 by Feral Interactive.

=== Medieval II: Total War ===
Medieval II: Total War, a sequel to Medieval: Total War, was released on 10 November 2006 in Europe and on 14 November in North America. The game includes much more detailed characters and features the Age of Discovery (and colonisation of the Americas) and the Mongol and Timurid invasions. An expansion pack, Medieval II: Total War: Kingdoms, was announced on 30 March 2007. It was released on 28 August 2007. The Gold Edition of the game, containing the original game and the expansion pack, was released on 1 February 2008. The Kingdoms expansion pack contained 4 campaigns: the Britannia Campaign, set in the British Isles in 1258, during the reign of Henry III of England; the Crusades Campaign, set in the Middle East in 1174; the Teutonic Campaign, set in the Baltic region of Eastern Europe in 1250; and the Americas Campaign, set in the New World in 1521, during the decline of the Aztec and Maya civilisations.

=== Empire: Total War ===
Empire: Total War was announced on 22 August 2007 by Sega and had been secretly in development since the release of Barbarian Invasion. Players choose an 18th-century faction and set out to achieve domination over the known world through military force, diplomacy, espionage and economics. For the first time in a Total War game, players have the ability to play real-time 3D naval battles. Also a feature that had been developed in the game was the decentralisation of provinces, adding greater realism in that many features, from production to technological advancement, would occur outside of the capital of the province. Empire: Total War was released on 3 March 2009 in North America and 4 March in Europe. The expansion pack, Empire: Total War: Warpath, was released in October 2009. Warpath is set in the Americas where it is possible to control one of five different Native American nations. While the game was critically acclaimed due to its innovative game play, the game has been subject to most of the criticism of the Total War series by many critics and fans after its release due to bugs; Sega claims nearly all issues have been resolved. The issues have been explained by Creative Assembly several months after the game's release. It was the first in the series to use Valve's Steamworks DRM and achievements system, thereby requiring Steam to be played. A mobile version of the game developed by Feral Interactive was released on 21 November 2024 for both iOS and Android.

=== Napoleon: Total War ===
Napoleon: Total War was released in North America on 23 February 2010, and in Europe on 26 February. The game focuses on the politics and major military campaigns of the French Revolutionary Wars in the late 18th century and the Napoleonic Wars of the early 19th century. Napoleon was released with several editions: the Standard Edition (as well as a limited-edition version of the Standard Edition), Imperial Edition, and the Emperor's Edition (available in Australia and New Zealand only). Players assume the role of Napoleon Bonaparte or one of his major rivals on a turn-based campaign map and engage in the subsequent battles in real-time. As with its predecessor, Empire: Total War, which included a special episodic United States story line, Napoleon features three separate campaigns that follow the general's early Italian and Egyptian campaigns as well as the European campaign and the Battle of Waterloo.

In the grand campaign, "Campaigns of the Coalition", the player plays as Great Britain, Austria, Prussia, or Russia in a map that spans Europe. There is also a second campaign available as DLC, the "Peninsular campaign", in which the player vies for control of the Iberian peninsula. The campaign is playable as either France, Spain, or Great Britain. Napoleon: Total War Gold Edition premiered for Macs on 3 June 2013.

=== Total War: Shogun 2 ===
On 2 June 2010 Creative Assembly released a full preview of Total War: Shogun 2 set in the middle of the 16th century in Medieval Japan during a period of isolation and military conflict called Sengoku Jidai (the warring states period). The new battle engine supports up to 56,000 soldiers in a single battle, making them significantly larger than in Napoleon. Shogun 2 is the first game of the series to feature the franchise's name appearing as the primary title in an effort to increase brand awareness. The game was released on 15 March 2011.

Total War: Shogun 2: Fall of the Samurai is a stand-alone expansion to Total War: Shogun 2 released in March 2012. The game explores the conflict between the Imperial throne and the last Shogun around the time of the Boshin War in 19th-century Japan, 300 years after the events of the original game in a clash of traditional Samurai culture with the power of modern weaponry. There are six new playable clans (Satsuma, Tosa, and Choshu, Imperial and Aizu, Nagaoka, and Jozai Shogunate) plus four DLC clans (Tsu, Saga, Obama, and Sendai), supporting either the Imperial throne or the Tokugawa Shogunate. Also portrayed in a limited role are Britain, United States, and France, with each of whom trade deals can be struck (given the proper infrastructure) and from whom marines can be recruited. A new feature is the land and sea unit interactions which includes the ability to call in offshore artillery support barrages, coastal gun emplacements that target enemy ships, and the ability to call in campaign map bombardments – bombarding armies and cities in adjacent coastal areas of the campaign map. Other new features are railway networks, ironclad warships, improved siege battle mechanics (with upgradable tower defences, each with their own specialty), new agent types, the ability to control two armies on the battle map at the same time, a third-person shooter for torpedo gunboats, coastal batteries, Gatling guns and cannons, and a multiplayer overhaul.

=== Total War: Rome II ===
On 2 July 2012, Creative Assembly announced Total War: Rome II with a live-action trailer that features different scenes with the theme "How far will you go for Rome?". Work on the title began during the development of Total War: Shogun 2. Creative Assembly announced that the game would have a bigger map than its predecessor, "go more to the east", have many new game features, and new camera views in-battle, allowing the player to see the battle from almost every angle. They further claimed that the game was developed using a new programming system, which allows it to achieve better graphical quality, including dynamic facial expressions. The game was released on 3 September 2013. This title hit record high pre-order sales for Creative Assembly, with the Greek States Culture Pack unlocking Sparta, Athens, and Epirus in the campaign as a pre-order bonus. The initial release suffered from significant performance issues as well as having many bugs that severely affected gameplay.

=== Total War: Attila ===
On 25 September 2014, Creative Assembly announced Total War: Attila at the Eurogamer Expo. Using the same engine as Total War: Rome II, the game followed the life of Attila the Hun during the Dark Ages of Europe, much like Napoleon: Total War did with Napoleon's life after Empire: Total War. According to Creative Assembly, Total War: Attila would implement an "apocalyptic" atmosphere, with hostile weather and darker lighting. Total War: Attila was released on 17 February 2015.

=== Total War: Warhammer ===
Announced on 22 April 2015, Total War: Warhammer changes the rules of the series as it takes place in a setting of high fantasy. The setting comes from Games Workshop's Warhammer Fantasy. The real-time battles and turn-based sandbox campaigns, a staple of the series, return. Races include the men of the Empire and Bretonnia, Orcs and Goblins (Greenskins), Dwarfs, Vampire Counts, the Warriors of Chaos, Beastmen, Wood Elves, and the Norscan Tribes. Sega revealed this is the first in what will be a trilogy of titles. Total War: Warhammer was released on 24 May 2016.

=== Total War: Warhammer II ===
Announced on 31 March 2017 at EGX Rezzed. It was released on 28 September 2017. It focuses on the conflicts in the New World and Ulthuan between the High Elves, Dark Elves, Skaven, and Lizardmen as they seek to control the Vortex. Later, the Tomb Kings (an Ancient Egyptian themed faction of skeletons, mummies etc.) and Vampire Coast (an undead pirate faction) were released as paid DLC. A grand campaign combining the map from the first game and the second was also released called Mortal Empires.

=== Total War Saga: Thrones of Britannia ===
Total War Saga: Thrones of Britannia was released on 3 May 2018. The game is set in 878 AD, after the death of Ragnar Lodbrok and subsequent Viking invasion of the British Isles by the Great Heathen Army. The game focuses on the kingdoms vying for power of the Isles. The playable factions are English, Welsh, Gaelic, part of the Great Viking army, and the Viking sea kings. The game received generally favourable reviews from critics but a mixed response from users. The game holds a Critic Score of 75 and a User Score of 54 on Metacritic.

=== Total War: Three Kingdoms ===
Released on 23 May 2019, Three Kingdoms takes the Total War series to China during the rule of the Han dynasty in 190 AD where the child Emperor Xian of Han is placed on the throne as a puppet ruler by his regent Dong Zhuo. The game centres on heroes who fight tyranny but whose ambitions may break their fragile alliance and divide China leading up to the rise of the Three Kingdoms period. The game is based on the ancient Chinese novel Romance of the Three Kingdoms.

Players can play warlords such as Cao Cao and Liu Bei. The graphics are different. There is a new battle system enabling the player to select Records, a more realistic mode, or Romance, seen by some to be a more fun and creative way to play. In Romance, players can control their warlords who now have special abilities. The campaign has also changed. There are six DLCs available: Eight Princes, set almost a hundred years after the original campaign; Mandate of Heaven, set eight years before, in the wake of the Yellow Turban Rebellion, A World Betrayed, set four years after the original campaign, Fates Divided, six years after A World Betrayed before the war between Cao Cao and Yuan Shao, Yellow Turban Rebellion, which allows the player to play as the Yellow Turban Faction within the original campaign; Reign of Blood, similar to the other DLCs available in Total War: Rome II and Total War: Attila called Blood and Gore and Blood and Burning respectively. Reign of Blood adds a new variety of combat animations and blood on the battlefield. A major expansion pack, The Furious Wild is also available, adding the Nanman people with four playable factions in the southwest.

=== Total War Saga: Troy ===
While in development Total War Saga: Troy used the "Saga" moniker, as did Total War Saga: Thrones of Britannia and as has retroactively been applied to The Fall of the Samurai standalone expansion for Total War: Shogun 2. It is to be the first Total War game set in the Bronze Age and was released on August 13, 2020. The game was free to claim for the first 24 hours after its release.

On September 24, Amazons was released as a free DLC for Total War Access account holders alongside Epic Games Store Mod Support, while multiplayer and Blood & Glory DLC was added October 29, 2020.

=== Total War: Warhammer III ===
Announced on 3 February 2021, the conclusion to the Total War: Warhammer trilogy introduces factions based on each of the four Chaos Gods (Khorne, Tzeentch, Nurgle, and Slaanesh), as well as the human civilisations of Kislev and Grand Cathay. The Ogre Kingdoms were included as a pre-order bonus and the Chaos Dwarfs as a later expansion. The game was released on 17 February 2022. Although, technically it is not a live service game, the Warhammer trilogy life-span means it is close to the live service genre at times.

=== Total War: Pharaoh ===
Total War: Pharaoh, focused on the New Kingdom period of Ancient Egypt, was announced on 23 May 2023 and released on 11 October 2023.

On 25 July 2024 the "Total War: Pharaoh - Dynasties" was released - as a huge free update to the main game (downloaded separately), which added a map expansion to the east and west of the original campaign map, that included additional regions such as Mesopotamia, Western Anatolia, Thracia, Achaea and Crete, featuring 168 new settlements and four new major factions including Babylon, Assyria, Mycenae, and Troy, along with twenty-five new minor factions.

=== Total War: Warhammer 40,000 ===
Total War: Warhammer 40,000 was announced on 12 December 2025 as being in early development. It will be the first Total War game released on consoles (specifically Xbox Series X/S and PlayStation 5) as well as PC.

=== Total War: Medieval III ===
Total War: Medieval III was announced on 4 December 2025 as being in early development.

== Spin-off games ==
=== Spartan: Total Warrior ===
Spartan: Total Warrior was developed by Creative Assembly and released in 2005 for the PlayStation 2, Xbox, and GameCube. Spartan: Total Warrior is a hack-and-slash action title that was to bring Total War's hallmark large-scale battles to the console market. Rather than adhering to historical accuracy, Creative Assembly took inspiration from Greek and Roman mythology to craft a setting that allows for more fantastical set pieces and foes. The player takes the role of a Spartan warrior guided by Ares, tasked with defeating the invading Roman Empire. The game features both a "campaign mode" and an "arena battle" mode. The campaign mode takes place over 14 levels, while the arena battle mode tasks the players with surviving enemy assaults of increasing difficulty. An indirect follow-up called Viking: Battle for Asgard was released in 2008, dropping the Total Warrior moniker.

=== Total War: Arena ===
Total War: Arena was a free-to-play game that was discontinued in February 2019.

=== Total War: Elysium ===
Total War: Elysium is an upcoming free-to-play strategy digital collectible card game where the player controls generals from across history in head-to-head battles against other players.

=== Total War Battles Series ===
==== Total War Battles: Shogun ====
Total War Battles: Shogun was released on 20 April 2012 for iOS. This game was also released for Android devices and Microsoft Windows. Set in medieval Japan, the game utilises real-time strategy and, like other Total War games, combines troop organisation and management, combat, and building management. Available troops include samurai, archers, ninja, and cavalry. The battle system uses hexagon tiles for movement and placement, and a new key feature to this game enforces the "Bushido" code of conduct where, once units are moved forward, they can no longer move backward. 1 vs 1 local multiplayer is available.

==== Total War Battles: Kingdom ====
From the team behind Total War Battles: Shogun, Total War Battles: Kingdom entered open beta on PC on 9 March 2015, following a limited closed beta. Set in medieval England, the game combines realm building and management with real-time battles and has been released for PC, Android, and iOS. Support ended on 28 April 2022 and the game is no longer available to play.

==== Total War Battles: Warhammer ====
Total War Battles: Warhammer is the upcoming third release of the Total War: Battles Series. Developed by NetEase, Total War Battles: WARHAMMER is officially licensed by Creative Assembly and Games Workshop. It aims to bring deep strategic gameplay in the epic Warhammer Fantasy Battles world to millions of mobile devices worldwide. The game will support Android and iOS Platforms.
