= Total War: Warhammer =

2016 video game

- Developer: Creative Assembly
- Publisher: Sega
- Directors: Mike Simpson; Ian Roxburgh
- Writer: Andy Hall
- Composers: Richard Beddow; Ian Livingstone; Timothy Michael Wynn; Tilman Sillescu
- Series: Total War; Warhammer Fantasy
- Platforms: Windows, Linux, macOS
- Release: Windows; 24 May 2016; Linux; 22 November 2016 macOS; 18 April 2017
- Genres: Turn-based strategy, real-time tactics
- Modes: Single-player, multiplayer

Total War: Warhammer is a 2016 turn-based strategy and real-time tactics video game developed by Creative Assembly and published by Sega for Windows via the Steam gaming platform. The game was brought to macOS and Linux by Feral Interactive. The game features the gameplay of the Total War series with factions of Games Workshop's Warhammer Fantasy series; it is the first Total War game not to portray a historical setting. It is the tenth title in the Total War series and the first title to be released in the Total War: Warhammer trilogy.

Like previous titles in the Total War series, gameplay unfolds both on a scale of kingdoms in a turn-based strategy campaign, managing cities and the movement of armies, and on a smaller scale in real-time tactics skirmishes and sieges, managing the movement and actions of individual units and characters within an army during a battle. The player controls one of several fantasy factions, each with their own units, characters and abilities. These include Dwarfs, Human factions, Greenskins and Vampire Counts at launch, with more added as paid downloadable content.

Total War: Warhammer was largely well received by critics, and sold over half a million copies in its first few days on sale. Total War: Warhammer was followed by two sequels: Total War: Warhammer II (2017) and Total War: Warhammer III (2022).

== Gameplay ==
Total War: Warhammer is a turn-based strategy game with real-time tactical battles between armies. While previous Total War games feature historical settings, Warhammer introduces the fantasy setting as well as characters from the Warhammer universe. These characters, which include monsters, warriors, and heroes, are controlled by the player or computer.

The game begins with the ascension of Karl Franz as the newly elected Emperor of the Empire and the recent turmoil that has occurred with a civil war uprising and the counts of the empire resenting his rule. His task is to unite his fractured kingdom and assert his dominion before challenging the other realms surrounding them and bring peace to the Old World. This peace is challenged by the eternal grudge of the Dwarfs towards the savage Greenskins, and the Vampires ruled by the Von Carsteins in far-flung Sylvania attempting to lead an undead army west and seize the Imperial throne. Yet in the north the Chaos horde rides and seeks to destroy everything in its path corrupting all that stands in its way of domination.

Total War: Warhammer featured four playable factions at launch, including the Empire (humans), the Greenskins (orcs and goblins), the Dwarfs and the Vampire Counts (undead). The Chaos faction, made up of evil humans and monsters, was available for free to those who pre-ordered or purchased in the first week of release and subsequently available as downloadable content (DLC). The Bretonnians, another human faction, are available since February 2017 for the Campaign, Skirmish and Multiplayer. Each faction has access to their own unique units and a campaign element, a new feature for Total War. For instance, the Greenskins faction featuring units such as Trolls and Giants, has the "Waaagh!" system, which pushes the player to always be on the warpath.

The campaign map is similar to that featured in Total War: Attila, the primary difference being the bigger changes in physical terrain and climate as one moves from a particular point in the map to another. The campaign map spans from the Chaos wastes in the north to the Greenskin-infested badlands in the south and from the Great Ocean in the west to the Dwarven realms in the World's Edge mountains to the east.

While Total War: Warhammer is built around the Total War system of city and unit building, army manoeuvring and diplomacy with other factions, it has numerous new elements that differ from previous Total War games. In addition to those already mentioned, they include the ability of agents to participate in battles to give your army an edge; a wider variety of animations, with 30 different types of skeleton and body types compared to only five or six previously; flying units such as dragons, which make use of the new animation capacity; corruption is now caused by the presence of Vampire Counts or Chaos armies, rather than internal factors; the renaming of Generals as Lords - they now fight as individuals rather than embedded within a bodyguard unit, and can be upgraded via skill and equipment trees to boost both their own and their army's power; and the addition of a quest mode which tasks players to complete missions and battles to receive unlockable items and abilities. One of the most significant new elements, however, is magic. Different factions have different amounts of access to the various "lores" (types) of magic, with some, such as the Dwarfs, having no access whatsoever. Units with access to magic can turn the tide of battles - their abilities are far more powerful than any available to battlefield units in previous games.

== Development ==
In December 2012, publisher Sega announced a partnership with Games Workshop to develop multiple titles for the Warhammer series. Sega tasked The Creative Assembly, the creator of the Total War series, to develop the titles. The first game in the series was set to be released "beyond 2013". At the time of the announcement, Creative Assembly had five titles in development, which included 2013's Total War: Rome II and 2014's Alien: Isolation. On January 13, 2015, the game was leaked through an artbook called The Art of Total War. The game was teased in a video released by The Creative Assembly to celebrate its 15th anniversary. However, the game was not officially announced until April 22, 2015, in which Sega released a cinematic debut trailer for the game. Total War: Warhammer is set to be the first title in a trilogy, with expansions and standalone titles to be released in the future. Total War: Warhammer was due to be released for Windows on April 28, 2016. However, on March 3, 2016, Creative Assembly announced that the game was delayed to May 24, 2016. The Linux version was released by Feral Interactive on 22 November 2016 with the macOS version following on 18 April 2017.

=== Downloadable content ===
The Chaos Warriors downloadable content (DLC) was the first DLC to be released for Total War: Warhammer; it was made available to purchase alongside its initial release and was included for those who preordered the game. This was widely criticized by the gaming community and from Warhammer fans in particular, with Creative Assembly, the developer of the game, stating they were "disheartened" by the reaction. On April 29, 2016, it was announced that the Chaos Warriors DLC would be available for free for a week after its release.

In May 2016, Creative Assembly announced that mods and Steam Workshop's features would be supported. Creative Assembly have developed several mods that were released alongside the game, while players can create their own mods through official mod tools. On September 26, 2018, an expanded limited-edition version of the game titled Total War: Warhammer: Dark Gods Edition was announced on the official site which included Warriors of Chaos, Bretonnia, and Norsca along with the four core races. On July 30, 2020 a second expanded limited edition called Total War: Warhammer: Savage Edition was announced which included Warriors of Chaos again as well as the Beastmen, not including its DLC that tied into the Wood Elves race pack.

Free DLC
| Name | Release date | Description |
|---|---|---|
| Wurrzag | October 2016 | Adds Wurrzag as a new Greenskin legendary lord, leading the Bloody Handz. |
| Grey Wizard | December 2016 | Adds the new hero Grey Wizard to the Empire. |
| Jade Wizard | December 2016 | Adds the new hero Jade Wizard to the Empire. |
| Grombrindal | January 2017 | Adds Grombrindal as a new Dwarf legendary lord. Grombrindal was previously available as part of a special promotion. |
| Bretonnia | February 2017 | Updates the Bretonnia faction, making them playable in campaign and multiplayer, led by Louen Leoncoeur, and adds two playable subfactions: Bordeleaux, led by Alberic d'Bordeleaux, and Carcasonne, led by the Fay Enchantress. Was later included in Dark Gods Edition. |
| Isabella von Carstein | February 2017 | Adds Isabella von Carstein as a new Vampire Counts legendary lord, leading the Von Carstein. Also migrates Vlad von Carstein to the Von Carstein faction. |
| 30th Birthday Regiments of Renown | August 2017 | Adds several Regiments of Renown to DLC and Free-LC races. This requires signing up for Total War Access. |

Paid DLC
| Name | Release date | Description |
|---|---|---|
| Chaos Warriors Race Pack | May 2016 | Adds the Warriors of Chaos as a playable faction in the Old World campaign, multiplayer and custom battles. Was later included in Dark Gods Edition and Savage Edition. |
| Blood for the Blood God | June 2016 | Adds various blood, gore and dismemberment effects to battles. If players own this, they get Blood for the Blood God II and Blood for the Blood God III for free (and vice versa). |
| Call of the Beastmen | July 2016 | Adds the Beastmen as a playable race in the Old World campaign and their own mini-campaign An Eye For An Eye. Was later included in Savage Edition |
| The Grim and the Grave | September 2016 | Adds the Legendary Lords Volkmar the Grim to The Empire, and Helman Ghorst to the Vampire Counts in campaign, multiplayer and custom battles. |
| The King and the Warlord | October 2016 | Adds the subfactions Clan Angrund and Crooked Moon, led by Belegar and Skarsnik, as well as new units for Dwarfs and Greenskins. |
| Realm of the Wood Elves | December 2016 | Adds the Wood Elves as a playable race in campaign, multiplayer etc. Adds The Season of Revelation campaign. |
| Norsca (DLC) | August 2017 | Updates the Norsca faction and Wintertooth subfaction, and makes them a playable race in the campaign, multiplayer and custom battles. Was later included in Dark Gods Edition. |

== Reception ==
Reception

Aggregate score
| Aggregator | Score |
|---|---|
| Metacritic | 86/100 |

Review scores
| Publication | Score |
|---|---|
| Destructoid | 8/10 |
| GameSpot | 9/10 |
| GamesRadar+ | 4.5/5 |
| IGN | 8.6/10 |
| PC Gamer (UK) | 86/100 |
| PC Games (DE) | 9/10 |

Total War: Warhammer had generally favourable reviews from critics. It has a score of 87/100 on Metacritic. IGN awarded it a score of 8.6 out of 10, saying: "Total War: Warhammer brims with exciting ideas, awesome characters, and delightful units and faction mechanics." GameSpot awarded it a score of 9.0 out of 10, saying: "It's a triumph of real-time strategy design, and the best the Total War series has ever been." PC Gamer awarded it a score of 86%, saying: "If you find real history a bit bland compared to glorious nonsense made up by strange British people then Warhammer is the Total War for you." Game Informer awarded it a score of 8.75 out of 10, saying: "the series has never felt so fun...Total War: Warhammer is one of the best Total War games I've ever played." The Guardian awarded it a score of four out of five stars, saying: "Total War: Warhammer has done the best it can do with the legacy Total War engine, and is also a loving tribute to Warhammer."

Total War: Warhammer was also the fastest-selling Total War game, selling half a million copies in the first few days on sale. As a promotional contest for the multiplayer online battle arena game Dota 2, Warhammer-themed community created cosmetics for playable characters in that game were released in September 2016.

== Sequels ==
Total War: Warhammer was designed to be split into three parts, the initial game being the first episode.

A sequel titled Total War: Warhammer II was released on September 28, 2017. The game features the Mortal Empires campaign, a massive campaign map combining the campaign maps and factions of both entries, and is accessible to players who owned both this and the previous game.

The third game Total War: Warhammer III was released on February 17, 2022. Once again, the game features a combined campaign map, the Immortal Empires campaign, that is accessible to any players who own the game, without the requirement to own the previous two, and was released as a DLC post-launch, leaving open beta in February 2023.
