= Total War: Warhammer II =

2017 video game

- Developer: Creative Assembly
- Publisher: Sega
- Director: Ian Roxburgh
- Writer: Andy Hall
- Series: Total War; Warhammer Fantasy
- Platforms: Windows, Linux, macOS
- Release: Windows; 28 September 2017; Linux, macOS; 20 November 2018
- Genres: Turn-based strategy, real-time tactics
- Modes: Single-player, multiplayer

Total War: Warhammer II is a turn-based strategy and real-time tactics video game developed by Creative Assembly and published by Sega. It is part of the Total War series and the sequel to 2016's Total War: Warhammer. The game is set in Games Workshop's Warhammer Fantasy fictional universe. The game was released for Windows-based PCs on 28 September 2017. Feral Interactive released the game on macOS and Linux on 20 November 2018. Total War: Warhammer II was succeeded by Total War: Warhammer III, which was released in February 2022.

== Gameplay ==
Total War: Warhammer II features turn-based strategy and real-time tactics gameplay similar to other games in the Total War series.

In the campaign, players move armies around the map and manage settlements in a turn-based manner. Players engage in diplomacy with, and fight against, AI-controlled factions. When armies meet, they battle in real-time. The game also has a custom battles mode where players can create customised real-time battles, as well as online multiplayer battles. Those who own races from the first game will have the same races unlocked for multiplayer in the second game.

The game's announced races in the campaign include the Lizardmen, High Elves, Dark Elves and Skaven. The Tomb Kings and Vampire Coast (a faction of undead pirates) debuted later as paid downloadable content factions, along with The Huntsmarshal's Expedition (the Empire), the Chevaliers de Lyonesse (Bretonnia), Broken Axe (Greenskins), Heralds of Ariel (Wood Elves), the Slaughterhorn Tribe (Beastmen), and Ironbrow’s Expedition (Dwarfs).

The main campaign of the game is called Eye of the Vortex. It is a narrative-focused campaign where each of the playable races has its own story and cutscenes. In addition, players who own both Total War: Warhammer and Total War: Warhammer II have access to a huge combined campaign called Mortal Empires, which is more of a sandbox experience. Mortal Empires must be downloaded manually from Steam, but is free for players who own both games.

The campaign can also be played online with another player in co-operative or head-to-head modes.

== Plot ==
=== Battle for the Vortex ===
The Old Ones, powerful godlike beings, created races in the Warhammer world to fight the forces of Chaos. The stellar gates which the Old Ones used to enter the world collapsed, leading to a flood of Chaos that was held at bay by the Lizardmen. Two High Elf heroes in Ulthuan responded to this threat. Aenarion "the Defender" mustered armies whilst Caledor Dragontamer planned to drain magical energy from the world, thus stopping the Chaos invasion. This manifested itself as the Great Vortex, accomplished with the help of the Lizardmen leaders, the Slann. It drained Chaos energy at the expense of locking Caledor and his mages in time, eternally casting spells to maintain the vortex.

Millennia later, in the time when the game is set, a Skaven rocket disguised as a twin-tailed comet disrupts the Great Vortex. The four main playable factions respond to this in different ways. The High Elves and Lizardmen seek to stabilize the Vortex, while the Skaven and Dark Elves seek to use its power for world conquest. The Skaven launched this rocket to provoke rituals from these four major factions. The Skaven could then harness this ritual energy to allow the Skaven god, the Great Horned Rat, to enter the world and thus conquer it. When the player completes the fifth ritual, their race fights a 'final battle' on the Isle of the Dead to determine the fate of the Vortex and thus the world. Winning the 'final battle' results in winning the race's objectives. The High Elves and Lizardmen stabilize the Vortex. The Dark Elves use the Vortex's power to transform their leader Malekith into a god. The Skaven summon the Horned Rat and conquer the world.

=== Rise of the Tomb Kings ===
Five thousand years ago, the desert kingdom of Nehekhara was the first and greatest human civilization in the world. However, Nehekhara was destroyed by Nagash, the first necromancer. Through the power of his Black Pyramid, Nagash enacted a great spell that would kill all that lived in Nehekhara and raise them as his undead servants. Before the spell could be completed, Nagash was slain by Alcadizaar the Conqueror, the last king of Nehekhara, with the aid of the Skaven (who had initially allied with the Great Necromancer, but betrayed him after they realized how great a threat Nagash was). The Nehekharan dead returned as the Tomb Kings, but because Nagash's ritual was incomplete, many of the Tomb Kings retained their free will and intellect.

In the current day, the false twin-tailed comet has stirred the Black Pyramid from its slumber and courses with power. It is discovered that five of the nine books of Nagash are needed to control the Black Pyramid. Four Tomb King factions battle to control it: Khemri, led by Settra the Imperishable; the Exiles of Nehek, led by Grand Hierophant Khatep; the Court of Lybaras, led by High Queen Khalida; and the Followers of Nagash, led by Arkhan the Black. Settra, the first and greatest king of Nehekhara, seeks the pyramid's power to regain control over his domain and begin global conquest. Khatep, the oldest of the Liche Priests, seeks to end his exile by using the pyramid to fulfill the promise he made to Settra to transform him and the Nehekharan nobility into immortal golden beings. Khalida, the champion of the Asp Goddess, seeks the pyramid's power to take vengeance on her cousin Neferata, the first vampire, and to destroy all of vampire-kind. Arkhan, the Liche King and Nagash's second-in-command, seeks to use the power of the Black Pyramid to resurrect his master; as Nagash's servant, Arkhan already has one of the books, the Liber Mortis, and thus only needs to obtain four more to unlock the Black Pyramid.

Once all five of the books of Nagash are recovered, the final mission involves the player's chosen faction battling for the Black Pyramid. Should the player choose either Settra, Khalida, or Khatep, they will be on offense and join forces with the other two factions to fight against Arkhan as he guards the Black Pyramid. Should the player choose Arkhan, he will be on defense as he faces off against the combined forces of the former three.

=== Curse of the Vampire Coast ===
Long ago, Captain Jacob Wulfhart, brother of the famous Imperial Huntsmarshall, Markus Wulfhart, hunted the Merwyrm known as Amanar. Amanar is the oldest and mightiest of the Merwyrms and the guardian beast of the High Elf city of Lothern. Jacob created a weapon known as the Star-Metal Harpoon that would be used to slay the creature. During the climactic battle, Amanar destroyed Jacob's ship, the Vengeance, killing the captain and his crew, save for one survivor. The survivor created a map that would lead to the Vengeance's resting place, and within its confines, the Star-Metal Harpoon.

In the present the disturbance of the Great Vortex has riled Amanar from its slumber, driving the ancient Merwyrm mad, causing it to rampage across the seas and destroying many ships and coastal settlements in its fury. Four factions of the Vampire Coast seek to slay Amanar and resurrect it as their mighty undead servant, thus becoming the dominant power of the seas: Luthor Harkon, ruler of the Vampire Coast and Arch-Grand Commodore of the Awakened; Count Noctilus, the master of the Dreadfleet; Aranessa Saltspite, the Pirate-Queen of Sartosa; Madame-Captain Cylostra Direfin, the spectral leader of the Drowned.

Once the Star-Metal Harpoon has been recovered, and its power restored through three sea-shanties, the player's faction is then confronted by Lokhir Fellheart, the Dark Elf Krakenlord of Karond Kar. Fellheart and his army battles the player's faction, intending to take the Harpoon to slay Amanar and gain glory. Once Fellheart is defeated, the campaign ends with the player's faction shooting the Star-Metal Harpoon at Amanar, killing it and is then resurrected as an undead minion.

=== The Hunter and the Beast ===
The Empire of Man sends colonists to establish settlements along the coast of Lustria. Disturbed by the Imperials' plundering of their gold, the Lizardmen attack the settlements, led by Nakai the Wanderer. To respond to Nakai's attacks, the Empire sends Markus Wulfhart, one of the greatest hunters in the whole Empire, to defeat Nakai.

If Nakai wins, the Empire has to abandon its colonies as they were overrun by the Lizardmen. If Markus wins, more Lustrian cities will be plundered and their wealth will be sent back to the Old World.

=== Repanse de Lyonesse ===
Repanse de Lyonesse leads a crusade in the coast of Araby to purify the evils blighting its landscape. Her final mission involves facing off against three Tomb King legendary lords: Settra the Imperishable, High Queen Khalida and Grand Hierophant Khatep.

=== The Twisted and The Twilight ===
Driven by his painful hunger induced by his mutations, Throt the Unclean musters his armies to invade the Witchwood, a magical forest in northern Naggaroth. He is opposed by Naestra and Arahan, two sisters who defend the forest. The two sisters, known as the Sisters of Twilight, also fight more enemies to heal the Witchwood and other magical forests, and in the process awaken Queen Ariel, who conducts a magical ritual to seal the forest from Daemon infestation.

Once Ariel has been awakened, Throt the Unclean leads his invasion to attack the Witchwood. If he wins, he kills Ariel and eats her, and more Daemons are unleashed. If the Sisters of Twilight win, Ariel's ritual succeeds and the magical forests are saved from Daemonic invasion.

=== The Silence and the Fury ===
The mighty doombull Taurox, blessed by the Ruinous Powers with a body of near-impervious brass, is visited in visions by the Lords of Ruin, promising him an even greater reward if he can locate the Heart of the Dark, where a most ancient and foul Herdstone stands, and perform a dark ritual that will unleash Chaos into the world. Sensing the incoming catastrophe, the Lizardmen summon their deadliest assassin, Oxyotl, to hunt down Taurox.

Eventually, the Brass Bull and the Silent Slayer clash in the Heart of the Dark. If Oxyotl wins, the Herdstone is sundered and its vile energies are dispersed, saving the world from Chaos, at least for now. If Taurox wins, the ritual of Chaos is successfully completed, unleashing an age of nightmares and slaughter upon the world.

== Development and release ==
Total War: Warhammer II was developed by UK-based video game studio Creative Assembly. The game was announced in London at EGX Rezzed in March 2017. It is the second installment in a planned trilogy of Total War: Warhammer games. The game was released for Windows-based PCs on 28 September 2017, with Sega publishing.

== Downloadable content ==
Creative Assembly has released several paid and free DLC packs for the game, which expand its content. Mortal Empires, a massive combined campaign for players who own both Total War: Warhammer and Total War: Warhammer II, was released in October 2017.

Paid DLC
Name	Release date	Description
Blood for the Blood God II	October 2017	Adds various blood and gore effects in battle. Free for players who owned Blood for the Blood God in Total War: Warhammer.
Rise of the Tomb Kings	January 2018	Adds the Tomb Kings as a playable race in campaign and multiplayer, with four legendary lords: Settra the Imperishable leading the Khemri faction, High Queen Khalida leading the Court of Lybaras faction, Grand Hierophant Khatep leading the Exiles of Nehek faction, and Arkhan the Black leading the Followers of Nagash faction.
The Queen and the Crone	May 2018	Adds Alarielle the Radiant as a new High Elf legendary lord, leading the Avelorn faction, and Crone Hellebron as a new Dark Elf legendary lord, leading the Har Ganeth faction, as well as new units, Regiments of Renown and mechanics.
Curse of the Vampire Coast	November 2018	Adds the Vampire Coast as a playable race in campaign and multiplayer, with four legendary lords: Luthor Harkon leading the Awakened faction, Count Noctilus leading the Dreadfleet faction, Aranessa Saltspite leading the Pirates of Sartosa faction, and Cylostra Direfin leading the Drowned faction.
The Prophet and the Warlock	April 2019	Adds Tehenhauin as a new Lizardmen legendary lord, leading the Cult of Sotek faction, and Ikit Claw as a new Skaven legendary lord, leading the Clan Skyre faction, as well as new units, Regiments of Renown and mechanics.
The Hunter and The Beast	September 2019	Adds Markus Wulfhart as a new Empire legendary lord, leading the Huntsmarshal's Expedition faction, and Nakai the Wanderer as a new Lizardmen legendary lord, leading the Spirit of the Jungle faction, as well as new units, Regiments of Renown and mechanics.
The Shadow and the Blade	December 2019	Adds Deathmaster Snikch as a new Skaven legendary lord, leading the Clan Eshin faction, and Malus Darkblade as a new Dark Elf legendary lord, leading the Hag Graef faction, as well as new units, Regiments of Renown and mechanics.
The Warden and the Paunch	May 2020	Adds Eltharion the Grim as a new High Elf legendary lord, leading the Yvresse faction, and Grom the Paunch as a new Greenskin legendary lord, leading the Broken Axe Tribe faction, as well as new units, Regiments of Renown and mechanics.
The Twisted and the Twilight	December 2020	Adds Throt the Unclean as a new Skaven legendary lord, leading the Clan Moulder faction, and the Sisters of Twilight as a new Wood Elf legendary lord, leading the Heralds of Ariel faction, as well as new units, Regiments of Renown and mechanics.
The Silence and the Fury	July 2021	Adds Oxyotl as a new Lizardmen legendary lord, leading the Ghosts of Pahuax faction, and Taurox the Brass Bull as a new Beastmen legendary lord, leading the Slaughterhorn Tribe faction, as well as new units, Regiments of Renown and mechanics.

Free DLC
Name	Release date	Description
The Laboratory	December 2017	Adds the Laboratory game mode, allowing players to experiment with custom options, settings and sliders to create their own custom battles.
Tretch Craventail	January 2018	Adds Tretch Craventail as a new Skaven legendary lord, leading the Clan Rictus faction.
Alith Anar	May 2018	Adds Alith Anar as a new High Elf legendary lord, leading the Nagarythe faction.
Lokhir Fellheart	November 2018	Adds Lokhir Fellheart as a new Dark Elf legendary lord, leading the Blessed Dread faction.
Tiktaq'to	April 2019	Adds Tiktaq'to as a new Lizardmen legendary lord, leading the Tlaqua faction.
Gor-Rok	September 2019	Adds Gor-Rok as a new Lizardmen legendary lord, leading the Itza faction.
Gotrek & Felix	September 2019	Adds Gotrek and Felix as recruitable characters for the Empire, Bretonnia and Dwarf races.
Repanse de Lyonesse	December 2019	Adds Repanse de Lyonesse as a new Bretonnian legendary lord, leading the Chevaliers de Lyonesse faction.
Imrik	May 2020	Adds Prince Imrik as a new High Elf legendary lord, leading the Knights of Caledor faction.
Drycha	December 2020	Adds Drycha as a new Wood Elf legendary lord, leading the Wargrove of Woe faction, for owners of the Realm of the Wood Elves DLC.
Rakarth	March 2021	Adds Beastlord Rakarth as a new Dark Elf legendary lord, leading the Thousand Maws faction.
Thorek Ironbrow	July 2021	Adds Thorek Ironbrow as a new Dwarf legendary lord, leading the Ironbrow's Expedition faction.

== Reception ==
Reception

Aggregate score
Aggregator	Score
Metacritic	87/100

Review scores
Publication	Score
Destructoid	8.5/10
Eurogamer	Recommended
Game Informer	8.75/10
GameSpot	9/10
Hardcore Gamer	4/5
IGN	9.1/10
PC Gamer (US)	92/100
Polygon	8/10
Shacknews	8/10
VentureBeat	86/100

Total War: Warhammer II received "generally favorable" reviews upon release, according to review aggregator Metacritic.

Destructoid and Eurogamer called the game one of the best titles in the Total War series and cited the variety of factions, locations, gameplay, and campaign size as the game's positives while taking minor issue with the battle AI, inconsistent diplomacy, and amount of CPU power needed to run the game. Game Informer praised the variety of races and Creative Assembly's ability to remove some, if not all, of the endgame monotony. IGN and PC Gamer praised the Skaven race, faction mechanics, Great Vortex campaign, endgame, and improvements made to the UI while finding minor grievances with the wonky diplomacy system and high system requirements. GameSpot gave the game a 9 out of 10, and praised the fantasy combat, tight pacing, new races, introduction of different tactical options, diverse map types, and visuals, while criticizing the zoomed-in camera and lack of several multiplayer factions in competitive multiplayer modes.

Eurogamer ranked the game tenth on their list of the "Top 50 Games of 2017". It won the award for "Best Strategy Game" in PC Gamer's 2017 Game of the Year Awards, and was nominated for "Game of the Year". It was also nominated for "Best PC Game" and "Best Strategy Game" in IGN's Best of 2017 Awards.

=== Awards ===
Year	Award	Category	Result	Ref.
2017	Game Critics Awards	Best PC Game	Nominated	
2017	Game Critics Awards	Best Strategy Game	Nominated	
2017	Gamescom 2017	Best Booth Award	Nominated	
2017	Gamescom 2017	Best PC Game	Nominated	
2017	Gamescom 2017	Best Strategy Game	Nominated	
2017	Golden Joystick Awards	PC Game of the Year	Nominated	
2017	Hollywood Music in Media Awards	Original Score - Video Game	Nominated	
2017	Ping Awards	Best International Game	Nominated	
2017	The Game Awards 2017	Best Strategy Game	Nominated	
2018	21st Annual D.I.C.E. Awards	Strategy/Simulation Game of the Year	Nominated	
2018	National Academy of Video Game Trade Reviewers Awards	Game, Strategy	Nominated	
2018	14th British Academy Games Awards	British Game	Nominated	
2018	Develop Awards	Animation	Nominated	
2018	Develop Awards	Music Design	Nominated	
