= Total War Saga: Thrones of Britannia =

2018 strategy video game

- Developer: Creative Assembly
- Publisher: Sega
- Director: Jack Lusted
- Designers: Paul Strong; Craig Kirby; Laura Kampis; Joy Dey
- Programmer: Mihai Simionescu
- Artist: Nick Tresadern
- Writers: Chris Gambold; Martin Montford; Jaine Fenn
- Composer: Jack Melham
- Series: Total War
- Platforms: Windows, macOS, Linux
- Release: Windows: 3 May 2018; macOS: 24 May 2018; Linux: 7 June 2018
- Genres: Turn-based strategy, real-time tactics
- Modes: Single-player, multiplayer

Total War Saga: Thrones of Britannia is a turn-based strategy and real-time tactics video game developed by Creative Assembly and published by Sega, released on 3 May 2018 for Windows. The game was brought to macOS and Linux by Feral Interactive on 24 May 2018 and 7 June 2018 respectively. It is the twelfth game in the Total War series of video games.

The game is set in the British Isles, 878 AD. There are ten playable factions, including Wessex, Mercia, Circenn, Mide, Gwined, and the Danelaw.

== Gameplay ==
Like its predecessors, the game mixes aspects of a turn-based strategy and real-time tactics game. Thrones of Britannia takes place in the British Isles in 878 AD, after Alfred the Great defeated the Danes at the Battle of Edington and the signing of the Treaty of Wedmore. Players assume control of various factions including Vikings, Britons, Gaels and Anglo-Saxons, and compete against each other, declaring wars, forming alliances and trading, in order to establish total dominance on the map. When two or more armies are engaged in a fight, players command different unit regiments and move them around the map, which allows to use any tactics in order to gain advantage and win. Players can also fund research for new projects, recruit and manage new characters for their cause, engage in diplomacy with other factions, raid, build and develop towns and regions to strengthen their economical power.

== Development ==
Thrones of Britannia is the first game in the Total War Saga series, which was developed by Creative Assembly to be a shorter but more focused Total War game by focusing on a particular time period in history instead of being era-spanning. According to Mike Simpson, the series director, the Saga series aims at "putting defined geographical areas under the microscope" with a "strong cultural focus and flavour". Initially the game was set to be released on 19 April 2018, but Creative Assembly delayed the game's launch to 3 May 2018 in order to have extra time for polishing the game.

== Reception ==
Reception

Aggregate score
Aggregator	Score
Metacritic	75/100

Review scores
Publication	Score
GameSpot	8/10
IGN	7.7/10
PC Gamer (US)	73/100
PCGamesN	8/10
USgamer	3.5/5
CGMagazine	9/10

The game has received positive reviews. It has an aggregated score of 75 on Metacritic, indicating "Generally favorable reviews". The game garnered some criticism for what some perceived as stripped campaign and issues with combat compared to previous games, and a lack of variation between factions.

The game won the award for "Best Strategy Game" at The Independent Game Developers' Association Awards 2018; its other nominations were for "Best Educational Game", "Best Audio Design", and "Heritage".
