= Total War: Rome II =

2013 strategy video game by Creative Assembly

- Developer: Creative Assembly
- Publisher: Sega
- Composer: Richard Beddow
- Series: Total War
- Platforms: Microsoft Windows, macOS
- Release: Microsoft Windows: WW: 3 September 2013; macOS: WW: 3 September 2014
- Genres: Turn-based strategy, real-time tactics
- Modes: Single-player, multiplayer

Total War: Rome II is a strategy video game developed by Creative Assembly and published by Sega. It was released on 3 September 2013, for Microsoft Windows as the eighth standalone game in the Total War series of video games and the successor to the 2004 game Rome: Total War.

Rome II received generally positive reviews from critics on release, but was criticized for its significant technical problems. However, it proved a commercial success, surpassing all other games in the Total War series in both sales and number of concurrent players on its release day. In September 2014, an Emperor Edition was released, which added macOS support and addressed many of the technical problems in the game, as well as overhauled AI battles and upgraded certain visual elements. It was offered as a standalone edition and a free upgrade to all current players.

== Gameplay ==
Total War: Rome II is set in Europe, the Mediterranean, and the Near East in the Classical antiquity period. The grand single-player campaign begins in 272 BC at the end of the Pyrrhic War, lasting for 300 years. However, the player also has the option to play further, as there are no timed victory conditions.

Like its predecessor, Rome II blends turn-based grand strategy and civilization management with real-time tactical battles. The Warscape engine powers the game's visuals and new unit cameras allow players to focus on individual soldiers on the real-time battlefield, which may contain thousands of combatants at the same time. Creative Assembly has stated that it wished to bring out the more human side of war, with soldiers reacting as their comrades get killed around them, and officers inspiring men with heroic speeches.

Rome II features more sophisticated portrayals of each culture and civilization of the period, which in its predecessor had been portrayed anachronistically. The Creative Assembly tried to ensure the uniqueness of different cultures and fighting forces. Lead unit designer Jack Lusted stated that instead of the "rebel nation" used to represent minor states in the original Rome: Total War, Rome II features a large number of smaller, individual nations and city-states represented by their own factions. Each ethnic group has a unique play-style. A tribe of Gallic barbarians looks and feels different from a disciplined Roman legion. Different agents and technologies are implemented for different factions. There are over 500 different land units in the game, including mercenaries. Over 30 different city variants avoid siege battles feeling and playing out the same every time.

=== Diplomacy ===
The diplomacy system has been revamped with a new artificial intelligence. The Creative Assembly has acknowledged anomalies in previous games, where the AI could perform strange or even suicidal actions, such as very small factions declaring war on very large ones such as the Roman Empire; the AI is said to be more "intelligent" and cunning in Rome II. The player's own actions will determine whether or not the enemy AI will be a trustworthy ally or a suspicious traitor.

The political system of Rome II has been completely redone. The factions of Rome and Carthage each have three political entities that vie for power. Players will choose to be part of one of the entities once they select the faction they want to play. Other factions have internal politics between a single ruling family and a class of nobles. The political standing of different entities is based on a resource system, which is, in turn, based on the deeds and actions of its generals and characters. If one's standing drops too low, they may find themselves powerless to affect their nation's affairs, or if they become too powerful, rivals might unite against them. In certain cases, a player may attempt to take all power for himself to become emperor or king, which requires a civil war—another part of the game completely redesigned.

As with Total War: Shogun 2, the player is prompted with decisions throughout the game. The Creative Assembly has expanded on this mechanic, with each decision leading the player down a particular "decision path" based on previous decisions. These then affect the way the campaign plays out; for example, the Roman Republic may become the Roman Empire through civil war. Additionally, rather than solely assigning traits to generals and family members as with previous Total War games, the player can assign traits to entire legions as they gain combat experience. Players can also customize legions by choosing their weapons. Players can still determine the composition of individual cohorts, even though they will be building entire legions at a time, unlike in previous Total War titles where all units had to be created separately.

As with Rome: Total War, special units known as agents play important roles in gameplay. There are three core types of agents in Rome II: the dignitary, the champion, and the spy, and each culture has its own variants. When spawned, each agent has a "profession" that is determined by its supposed background or ethnicity. A player can invest in an agent's profession as well as its skill tree. Each agent can try to assassinate other characters or convert them to their faction. When an agent is asked to perform a certain task, there is a deeper set of choices on how to complete the task. For example, when getting rid of an enemy agent, one can bribe him, convert him, or murder him.

=== Combat ===
In addition to traditional sieges and field battles, a myriad of other battle types is available in Total War: Rome II. These include:

- Combined naval/land battles: These occur when assaulting a coastal city, or when two armies are near the coastline.
- Settlement outskirts battles: These are fought near regional capitals that are too small to have walls. The primary objective is to capture the city rather than destroy or rout the enemy army, although victory can still be achieved by routing your opponent.
- Siege battles: These occur when an army assaults a provincial capital or a fortified settlement. In these battles, the cities include multiple capture points which the defender has to defend in order to win the fight.
- Encampment battles: These are triggered when an army attacks another that is in a defensive stance. The defending army has time to build fortifications around its perimeter, including wooden palisades or small forts.
- River battles: These are fought when an army tries to cross a major, navigable river and another tries to stop it. Navies can aid in this fight, although armies are able to build transport ships of their own to cross rivers.
- Ambushes: These have been revamped in Rome II. The ambushing army can place traps, such as flaming boulders and spikes, and the defending army must find a way to escape the area, although it can also attempt to defeat the ambushing army. An ambush battle is also triggered when an army attacks an enemy that was sabotaged.
- Port sieges: These are triggered when a navy sails into an enemy coastal city with a port. The navy will attempt to land its army in the city, while heavier ships intercept any enemy vessels and provide supporting fire using catapults and other projectiles.

Navies play an important role in Total War: Rome II. The Creative Assembly introduced mixed naval and land combat for land battles and city sieges, to reflect the naval strategies of the Classical era. Legions can attack the enemy's ground forces and cities, while naval units provide supporting fire or engage in naval warfare on the seas. Navies can conquer poorly guarded coastal cities by themselves. In addition, naval combat has been modified. Navies are now composed largely of troop carriers, designed to ram and board opposing ships, and land units can now commandeer merchant vessels as naval transport units. Naval units are bigger in size and a player may recruit several at a time. Naval regions, originally introduced in Medieval: Total War, have returned. Their purpose is to prevent players or the AI from slipping an invasion force right past a huge enemy fleet. Entering a naval region where an enemy fleet is present will trigger naval combat.

Armies and navies have changeable stances on the campaign map. Stances determine factors such as total movement points per turn or the ability to deploy traps for an ambush. The "Forced March" stance allows an army to march further, but will tire out its soldiers, reducing their fighting ability and leaving them vulnerable to ambush; the "Defensive Stance" enables fortifications such as stakes or redoubts and the "Ambush Stance" enables traps such as fireballs and sulphur pits. Armies and fleets can contain a maximum of 20 units and must have a general or admiral to lead them. A faction's power, or "imperium", determines the number of armies it can raise. A faction can gain more imperium by conquering more regions or acquiring more gold. Players can also name units in an army and change their emblems.

When an army is formed, the player must pick a general to lead it from a list of available faction members. Generals can now be both military leaders and skilled politicians, depending on their traits and skill trees. When an army recruits new units, it enters muster mode and cannot move until they have been added to the army. Both armies and generals can gain skills and traits from experience in battle. Each skill can be upgraded up to three times. If an army loses its general, a new one must be appointed by the player. These rules also apply to fleets and admirals.

=== Campaign ===
The game's primary campaign map extends from Bactria in the east (present-day Afghanistan) to Lusitania in the west (present-day Portugal), and from Caledonia in the north (present-day Scotland) to Garamantia in the south (present-day Libya) to Aksum (present-day Ethiopia), and is divided into 57 provinces and 173 regions. Each province is a grouping of up to four regions, and each region can be conquered separately. However, control of an entire province allows a player to pass edicts at a provincial level, which provide bonuses such as increased public happiness or military production. Construction options for regions within a province are displayed on a single menu, while public happiness is also province-based. This means that if public happiness drops too low, the most unhappy region will rebel instead of the entire province.

Individual villages and resource buildings are absent from the campaign map and are confined to the regional capital. Each regional capital generates an automatic garrison, with its size defined by its population, which can be increased by constructing various buildings. Armies now have a raid stance, which automatically generates loot and reduces their upkeep cost. A player can raid in both friendly and hostile territory, although raiding one's own regions is detrimental to public happiness.

Each province has a provincial capital with walls. Siege battles only occur when fighting in a provincial capital. Because of their larger size, provincial capitals also have more building slots than regional capitals.

=== Factions ===
The game features 117 factions, each with a unique unit roster and agenda, as well as overall bonuses and penalties. Eight of these are playable on the initial release, with more included either free or as paid downloadable content. The playable factions are divided into ten cultural groups: Hellenic, Latin, Punic, Celtic, Germanic, Desert Nomadic, Iberian, Tribal Nomadic, Balkan, and Eastern. Each has unique traits. Some factions focus on military conquest (such as the barbarians), while others (like the Hellenic or Eastern) focus more on diplomacy and trade. Playable factions from the Classical era include the Roman Republic, Carthage, Ptolemaic Egypt, the Seleucid Empire, Parthia, the Iceni, the Arverni, the Suebi, and Macedon.

The Caesar in Gaul downloadable content (DLC) pack adds numerous Gallic tribes not present in the main game, while Hannibal at the Gates adds two new Iberian factions as well as Syracuse. Imperator Augustus adds Lepidus', Mark Antony's, Pompey's, and Octavian's Roman Factions, as well as several other factions such as Dacia and Armenia.

== Downloadable content ==
Much like the other games in the Total War series, several packs of downloadable content have been released for Rome II, adding new factions, units, and standalone campaigns to the base game. Content released for free is marked with light green color in the table below.

Name	Release date	Additions and notes
Campaign packs
Caesar in Gaul	17 December 2013	Adds a new campaign based on the Gallic Wars (58–50 BC). The map covers Gaul and some surrounding lands and the campaign features 4 playable factions. Additional content: Caesar in Gaul also adds the Nervii, Boii, and Galatia as playable factions in the Grand Campaign.
Hannibal at the Gates	27 March 2014	Adds a new campaign based on the Second Punic War (218 BC). The map covers the western Mediterranean and the campaign features 5 playable factions. Additional content: Hannibal at the Gates also adds the Arevaci, Lusitani, and Syracuse as playable factions in the Grand Campaign.
Imperator Augustus	16 September 2014 (free)	Adds a new campaign based on the Second Triumvirate War (32–30 BC). The map covers Europe, the Middle East and North Africa and the campaign features 10 playable factions.
Wrath of Sparta	16 December 2014	Adds a new campaign based on the Peloponnesian War (beginning in 432 BC). The map covers Greece and parts of Anatolia and the campaign features 4 playable factions.
Empire Divided	30 November 2017	Adds a new campaign based on the Crisis of the Third Century with a focus on the reign of Aurelian (AD 270–275). The map covers Europe, the Middle East and North Africa and the campaign features 10 playable factions.
Rise of the Republic	9 August 2018	Adds a new campaign based on the expansion of the early Roman Republic (beginning in 399 BC). The map covers the Italian peninsula and some surrounding lands and the campaign features 8 playable factions.
Culture packs
Greek States	3 September 2013	Adds Athens, Epirus, and Sparta as playable factions in the Grand Campaign. The DLC was free for pre-purchase customers of Rome II, but was made available for purchase upon release date.
Nomadic Tribes	22 October 2013	Adds Massagetae, Roxolani, and Royal Scythia as playable factions in the Grand Campaign. This DLC was made available for free to all Rome II owners for the first week upon its release.
Pirates and Raiders	29 May 2014	Adds the Ardiaei, the Odrysian kingdom, and Tylis as playable factions in the Grand Campaign.
Black Sea Colonies	20 November 2014	Adds Cimmeria, Colchis, and Pergamon as playable factions in the Grand Campaign.
Desert Kingdoms	8 March 2018	Adds the Masaesyli, Kush, Saba, and Nabataea as playable factions in the Grand Campaign.
Unit packs
Epirus & Elephants	10 February 2014 (free)	Adds a new model for African elephants as well as four new units recruitable by Epirus.
Beasts of War	17 February 2014	Adds seven new animal-themed units. The number of added units was extended to ten post-release.
Daughters of Mars	15 August 2014	Adds seven new female units. Released alongside the August Warrior Update, which added a five further new units for free.
Faction packs
Pontus	3 September 2013 (free)	Adds Pontus as a playable faction in the Grand Campaign.
Seleucid Empire	18 October 2013 (free)	Adds the Seleucid Empire as a playable faction in the Grand Campaign.
Baktria	5 December 2013 (free)	Adds Baktria as a playable faction in the Grand Campaign.
Getae & Pydna	29 May 2014 (free)	Adds the Getae as a playable faction in the Grand Campaign as well as Battle of Pydna as a playable historical battle.
Armenia	16 September 2014 (free)	Adds Armenia as a playable faction in the Grand Campaign.
Massilia	20 November 2014 (free)	Adds Massilia as a playable faction in the Grand Campaign.
Other content
Blood & Gore	31 October 2013	Adds blood and increased violence to battles (not included in the base game to decrease the rating).
Seasons & Wonders	26 March 2014 (free)	Adds seasons and their effects to the game, alongside the Seven Wonders of the Ancient World and new units for Carthage.
Power & Politics	9 August 2018 (free)	Overhauls the political system of Rome II, adding political parties and various new possible actions. Released alongside the free Ancestral Update, which adds family trees to the game.

DLC timeline
2013	Greek States
2013	Nomadic Tribes
2013	Blood & Gore
2013	Caesar in Gaul
2014	Beasts of War
2014	Hannibal at the Gates
2014	Pirates and Raiders
2014	Daughters of Mars
2014	Black Sea Colonies
2014	Wrath of Sparta
2015
2016
2017	Empire Divided
2018	Desert Kingdoms
2018	Rise of the Republic

== Special editions ==
Since its original release, Total War: Rome II has been re-released numerous times in physical special editions bundled with a selection of thematically connected DLC packs.

Name	Release date	Additional content included (campaign packs underlined)
Total War: Rome II – Emperor Edition (Note: Emperor Edition was released as a free update for owners of Rome II, but also received a limited physical release of its own.)	16 September 2014	Imperator Augustus
Total War: Rome II – Spartan Edition	9 October 2015	Imperator Augustus, Wrath of Sparta, Greek States, Daughters of Mars
Total War: Rome II – Caesar Edition	6 September 2018	Imperator Augustus, Caesar in Gaul + Julius Caesar ebook
Total War: Rome II – Enemy at the Gates Edition	30 January 2020	Imperator Augustus, Hannibal at the Gates, Empire Divided

== Novels ==
According to The Bookseller website, Pan MacMillan and Thomas Dunne Books purchased the rights from The Creative Assembly in 2012 to publish a series of novels based on Total War: Rome II. Author David Gibbins was tasked to write the series, with the first of the novels released in October 2013.

== Reception ==
=== Critical reception ===
Reception

Aggregate score
Aggregator	Score
Metacritic	76/100

Review scores
Publication	Score
Edge	7/10
Eurogamer	7/10
Game Informer	8/10
GameSpot	8/10
GamesRadar+	4.5/5
GameTrailers	7.2/10
IGN	8.8/10
The Guardian	2/5
PC Gamer	85/100

Total War: Rome II has an average score of 76/100 on Metacritic, indicating "generally favorable reviews". PC Gamer scored the game 85%, praising the cinematic scale of the battles and attention to detail, calling them "stunning" and "the most marvellous moments of the fifty plus hours I've played so far". In the same review, however, there was also criticism towards apparent glitches on its initial release, including issues with the AI, calling it "floppy". Edge similarly praised the visuals and battles while noting bugs on release, stating that "even as it topples, it's glorious to look at, and to live through." Daniel Starkey of GameSpot enjoyed the variety of units and what it called "spectacular sound design and great attention to visual detail". However, in the same review, he also noted "problematic" camera angles and control, particularly during siege and larger field battles. Justin Clouse of The Escapist also enjoyed the unit and visual variety, stating "to its credit, Rome II does an excellent job of giving all the factions a unique feel", in what it called "impactful variations".

Outside of the battles, GameRevolution called the campaign map "a treat to look at" while also praising the new features and depth, yet took issue with the wait times between player and AI turns, a view echoed by Steve Butts of IGN who reported "a single turn can take as much as 10 minutes... those little inconveniences add up. Don't get me wrong; Rome II is a game worth savoring, but it also asks you to tolerate difficulties that don't need to exist". Paul Dean of Eurogamer enjoyed the new additions to the gameplay systems while also felt "stagnation" detracted from others, concluding that "for all that the game may have promised, it isn't such a big step forward for the series. It's Total War done a bit bigger, a bit better and a bit different." Adam Biessener of Game Informer unfavorably compared the game to the previous title in the franchise, Total War: Shogun 2, calling it a "step backwards", in that "where Shogun 2 accelerated into the massive endgame war just as administrating your empire started to become tedious, Rome II slows down far in advance of a campaign’s finale", concluding by calling it a "disappointment coming off of the brilliance of Shogun 2". Mike Suskle of GamesRadar, however, called it "a worthy continuation of the franchise and an overdue update to one of the greatest strategy games of all time".

The Emperor Edition was released on 16 September 2014, as a standalone release and a free update to all current players. The update integrated all prior fixes while adding improvements to the AI battles, political system, building chains, and visuals. Softpedia, for example, gave Emperor Edition a 90, saying that it "shows how much the title from The Creative Assembly has evolved since it was originally delivered and the way the entire experience has been updated based on the needs of the community and the cool ideas of the development team."

=== Technical problems and controversy ===
Upon the game's initial release many users reported technical faults such as being unable to load the game following installation, crashes, texture optimization problems, and broken artificial intelligence; poor game performance was also constantly reported. In a negative review by Rich Stanton for The Guardian, he reports having to re-download the full game following problems with his own review copy, noting that his "PC runs Shogun II at ultra settings without any issues but Rome II on medium makes it "choke like a dog", and judging by the developer's own forum many others are having the same issues." On the official forums, an "anonymous developer" from another studio posted his own complaints, including numerous bugs and poorly implemented features such as "capture the flag" style battles, feeling that the game had "comprehensively failed" to be tested and blaming the publisher Sega for its state on release. A review by critic and comedian Joe Vargas (aka Angry Joe) also complained about AI problems and unit balancing with in-game video examples while also noting differences with the preview builds, while William Usher of Cinema Blend supported Vargas' review while questioning other reviews due to the number of reported problems on release prior to patching. Following its release, developer The Creative Assembly announced regular patching in order to fix the reported issues, with the first update coming the Friday the same week of release. On the Total War official forums, admins on behalf of Creative Director Mike Simpson issued an apology along with a statement, promising to further patch the game, encouraging players to report all problems given the variety and difference of issues between players. Simpson would later go on to state, in a second public announcement about new and upcoming fixes, about asking for further player input while also "hoping we can fundamentally treat our releases differently in the future."

=== Sales ===
Total War: Rome II surpassed commercially all other games in the Total War series in both sales and number of concurrent players on its release day. By 23 August 2013, Total War: Rome II had achieved more than six times the number of pre-orders of Total War: Shogun 2, making Rome II the most pre-ordered game in the history of the Total War franchise. As of 31 March 2014, the game had sold 1.13 million copies in Europe and North America.
