= Ian Livingstone (composer) =

- Born: 4 July 1969 (age 57); London, England
- Occupation: Composer
- Years active: 1994–present

Ian Paul Livingstone (born 4 July 1969, in London) is a British composer for television, films and video games. He jointly won an Ivor Novello Award in 2011 for a video game score for Napoleon: Total War. He is best known as the composer of the F1 video game series.

He was classically trained from the age of five and has a background as a pop/dance music producer, band member and session musician. He is a graduate of Salford University.

== Notable works ==
=== Video games ===
Year	Title	Notes
1994	Rugby World Cup '95	Music
1998	Xenocracy	Music
1999	Formula One 99	Music
2000	Starlancer	Music
2000	Star Trek: Invasion	Music
2001	Lego Creator: Harry Potter	Music
2002	Disney's Treasure Planet	Music
2003	X2: Wolverine's Revenge	Music
2003	Warhammer 40,000: Fire Warrior	Music
2003	Sinbad: Legend of the Seven Seas	Music
2003	Project Gotham Racing 2	Music with Mathias Grünwaldt and Rainer Heesch
2003	Mace Griffin: Bounty Hunter	Music with Dean Evans
2003	Buffy the Vampire Slayer: Chaos Bleeds	Music
2004	Pixelus	Music
2005	Kingdom Hearts V CAST	Music
2005	Stolen	Music
2005	Predator: Concrete Jungle	Music
2005	Batman Begins	Music
2006	Hammer Heads	Music
2006	Bionicle Heroes	Music
2007	Boom Boom Rocket	Music
2007	Dungeons & Dragons Tactics	Music
2007	Company of Heroes: Opposing Fronts	Music with Inon Zur
2007	Bee Movie Game	Music
2008	Race Driver: Grid	Music with Aaron Sapp and Thomas Bergersen
2008	Monopoly	Music
2009	Burn Zombie Burn	Music
2009	Battlefield Heroes	Music
2009	Battlefield 1943	Music
2010	Napoleon: Total War	Music with Richard Beddow, Richard Birdstall and Simon Ravn
2010	F1 2010	Music
2010	Create	Music with Dominic Smart, David Newby and Hywel Payne
2010	Top Gun	Music
2011	F1 2011	Music
2011	Forza Motorsport 4	Two tracks
2011	All Zombies Must Die!	Music
2012	F1 2012	Music
2013	Grid 2	Music
2013	Total War: Rome II	Music with Simon Ravn
2013	F1 2013	Music
2013	WRC 4: FIA World Rally Championship	"Heroic Conflict" (licensed from KPM Music)
2013	Walking with Dinosaurs	Music
2014	Lego The Hobbit	Music with Rob Westwood
2014	Grid Autosport	Music with Phonat
2014	Valiant Hearts: The Great War	"Dream Within Dreams" (licensed from KPM Music)
2014	F1 2014	Music
2015	Total War: Attila	Music with various others
2015	Total War: Warhammer	Music with Richard Beddow, Tilman Sillescu and Tim Wynn
2015	Lego Dimensions	Music with Rob Westwood
2016	Lego Marvel's Avengers	Music with Rob Westwood
2016	Shadow of the Beast	Music
2017	Total War: Warhammer II	Music with various others
2017	Lego Worlds	Music with Rob Westwood
2018	MotoGP 18	Music
2018	Lego DC Super-Villains	Music with Simon Withenshaw
2019	MotoGP 19	Music
2019	Jumanji: The Video Game	Music with Michael Doherty
2020	Total War: Three Kingdoms - The Furious Wild	Music
2021	F1 2021	Music with various others
2021	Forza Horizon 5	"Tulum"
2022	Total War: Warhammer III	Music with various others
2022	Grid Legends	Music
2022	The Quarry	Music
2022	F1 22	Music with various others
2023	F1 23	Music with Ethan Livingstone and Brian Tyler
2024	Classified: France '44	Music
2024	F1 24	Music with Lapalux
2024	Funko Fusion	Music
2025	F1 25	Music with Ethan Livingstone

=== Television and film ===
He has composed for television for:

- Big Fat Gypsy Weddings
- The Great British Sewing Bee
- The Repair Shop
- Francesco's Mediterranean Voyage

The Expendabelles

=== Other ===
He has also produced songs, advertising jingles, movie scores and orchestrations. He also worked with Nokia during 2000 to 2004, creating polyphonic arrangements of monophonic ringtones, including the Nokia tune, as well as creating MIDI karaoke backing tracks for Roland.
