= F1 25 =

2025 racing video game

- Standard Edition cover, featuring from left to right: McLaren's Oscar Piastri, Williams's Carlos Sainz Jr., and Haas's Oliver Bearman
- Developer: Codemasters
- Publisher: EA Sports
- Director: Lee Mathers
- Producers: Paul Baber; Simon Säfström
- Designers: Dan Travis; Steven Embling
- Programmers: Anthony McGrath; Julian Thomas; Lee Walford; Rob Watkins
- Artists: Stuart Campbell; Frank Kitson
- Writers: Iain Sharkey; Stephen Long
- Composers: Ian Livingstone; Brian Tyler
- Series: F1
- Engine: EGO Engine 4.0
- Platforms: PlayStation 5; Windows; Xbox Series X/S
- Release: 30 May 2025 (Note: The Iconic Edition granted three-day access beginning on 27 May 2025.)
- Genre: Sim racing
- Modes: Single-player, multiplayer

F1 25 is a racing video game developed by Codemasters and published by EA Sports. It is the eighteenth entry in the F1 series and holds the license for the 2025 Formula One and Formula 2 championships. The game was released on 30 May 2025 for PlayStation 5, Windows and Xbox Series X/S. The 2026 season was released as post-launch downloadable content that was released on 3 June 2026. It received generally positive reviews from critics, who regarded it as an improvement over its predecessor.

== Gameplay ==
The game follows the traditional gameplay loop of previous titles, where players drive Formula One and Formula 2 cars using game controllers or steering wheels. Players may drive in a career mode, where they could either play as real drivers or their own custom driver, create their own team and become the owner, partake in time trials or singular Grand Prix weekends, or perform online challenges to unlock rewards. The Braking Point story mode, which featured in F1 2021 and F1 23, returns.

The game's handling model was updated, in response to negative feedback about the handling model from F1 24. The AI was adjusted to improve the racing for players. Some drivers from the 2025 FIA Formula 3 Championship were included in the game as driver icons, as well as those from Formula 2. Tracks were revamped using Lidar technology, more real team radio messages were added, alongside revamped podium ceremonies and the addition of Nvidia's Audio2Face AI lip synching technology. Laser-scanned tracks include Bahrain, Miami, Melbourne, Suzuka and Imola. F1 25 also adds inverted circuits, a first for the series; Silverstone, Zandvoort and the Red Bull Ring can now be driven in reverse in Grand Prix, Time Trial, Multiplayer and Career modes. The inverted circuits were reworked, with revamps to their DRS zones, AI, sector divisions, starting grid and pit stops.

MyTeam, which was introduced in F1 2020, received an overhaul for F1 25, being dubbed as “MyTeam 2.0”. Instead of being the owner-driver like in previous games, players can now call the shots as the owner of their team, similar to the F1 Manager series of games. However, the player may still drive as their hired drivers during the Grand Prix weekend.

The base game features all the drivers and tracks from the 2025 Formula One World Championship. Yuki Tsunoda drives for Red Bull Racing, while Liam Lawson drives for Racing Bulls as they both did in real life from the 2025 Japanese Grand Prix, although both of them are seen driving for the opposite team in Braking Point 3. Jack Doohan was released from Alpine F1 Team in real life before the 2025 Emilia Romagna Grand Prix, but this was not reflected in-game until a post-launch update replaced him with Franco Colapinto. At launch, drivers from the 2024 Formula 2 season are depicted, with 2025 drivers added in an update. Players also have the option to play as the protagonists of the film F1 (2025): Sonny Hayes, a racer-for-hire returning to F1 played by Brad Pitt; and Joshua Pearce, a hotshot rookie and Sonny's teammate played by Damson Idris. Ruben Cervantes, team owner of APXGP played by Javier Bardem, also appears in-game if the player uses the APXGP driver suit in MyTeam. In the Iconic Edition of the game, players can also race in scenarios featured in the film, with both footage of the film for the intro and in-game cutscenes for the outro, excluding the preview scenario. Hayes and Pearce, along with the drivers of Braking Point 3, may also appear as driver signings in MyTeam. Players can be able to choose either the standard 10 team lineup or add either Konnersport or APXGP (via DLC) as its 11th team in Career Modes.

=== 2026 Season Pack ===
The 2026 Season Pack includes the new regulations introduced for the corresponding season, all relevant circuit, handling and performance changes to reflect the season, all new cars, the Audi and Ford power units, the Audi and Cadillac teams, Sergio Pérez and Valtteri Bottas returning after they both found themselves without a seat for 2025, and Arvid Lindblad as the only rookie for the year, and the 2026 Formula 2 season drivers. Lindblad replaces Isack Hadjar at Racing Bulls, with the latter moving to Red Bull Racing, replacing Yuki Tsunoda. Having already been included in the base game, the 2026 DLC features the Bahrain and Saudi Arabian Grands Prix as part of the 2026 calendar despite the Bahrain Grand Prix being relocated and the Saudi Arabian Grand Prix being cancelled in real life, along with the sole new track introduced in 2026, Madring, which was released with the DLC. The DLC also features the new active aero, boost mode, and overtake mode features, replacing DRS and ERS. The 2026 season may also be played in driver and My Team career, with custom liveries available, and online multiplayer, though two-player career is not included; EA released a statement on Steam that confirmed that two-player career had been considered, though was cut to focus on the new simulation features. A reveal trailer was uploaded to YouTube on 20 May and a 5-minute video providing information, footage, and walkthrough of the game was released on 26 May. All cars are as depicted at the 2026 Australian Grand Prix. The cover art, which is set at Madring, depicts (from left to right) Gabriel Bortoleto, Lewis Hamilton and Bottas. The DLC was released on 3 June, with the PC version costing $25, while the console version costs $30. A bundle featuring the base game and the DLC was also released that replaces the existing Deluxe Edition.

== Story mode: Braking Point 3 ==
The Braking Point story mode that was introduced in F1 2021 returns in F1 25, set in the 2024 and 2025 seasons. Drivers Callie Mayer (voiced by Emer Kenny) and Aiden Jackson (voiced by Aiden Felgate) both return in Braking Point, as does Devon Butler (franchise linchpin using Adam Sanderson's likeness, voiced by Daniel Ben Zenou), Davidoff Butler (voiced by David Bark-Jones), Casper Akkerman (voiced by Christopher Dane), and Andreo Konner (voiced by Joe Alessi). The story mode revolves around the Konnersport Butler Global Racing Team as they mount a challenge for the World Championship.

New to this version of Braking Point is that in certain chapters, the player will have to choose as to which driver to play as, either Callie Mayer or Aiden Jackson. Whichever the player chooses there would be a unique outcome in the storyline.

=== Plot ===
In the 2024 season, Konnersport Butler Global Racing Team is bought by their key sponsor, Butler Global, along with their owner, Davidoff Butler, after Andreo Konner, the team owner, sold it to the company. Konnersport is run by Casper Akkerman, team principal and retired driver, and Devon Butler, team liaison and former driver. After pre-season testing in Bahrain, drivers Callie Mayer and Aiden Jackson aim to beat Red Bull Racing for the championship. During the Emilia Romagna Grand Prix, Max Verstappen pushes Aiden or Callie off track before both drivers manage to recover to finish in 3rd position. One month later, at the Austrian Grand Prix, Aiden and Callie both finish on the podium.

Right after taking the top of the Constructors in the Belgian Grand Prix, Devon learns from Evelyn Mayer, Callie and Devon’s mother, that Davidoff has died from an illness, prompting Callie to comfort him. Despite being indifferent about her turbulent relationship with Davidoff, Callie loses control of her car with both George Russell and Nico Hülkenberg also crashing out of the Dutch Grand Prix, triggering a red flag. As a result, Konnersport falls to second in the Constructors' Championship. Devon then learns that before he died, Davidoff left all assets of his company, Butler Global, to him, including Konnersport.

With Konnersport now under Devon's leadership and Callie's concern raising over the next few races, Devon dismisses Casper as team principal after the São Paulo Grand Prix, with Andreo returning to his position temporarily from the Qatar Grand Prix. Meanwhile, Casper has not spoken to Devon, refusing many of his calls and therefore announcing his permanent retirement to the media.

With Verstappen and Red Bull winning both titles at the end of the 2024 season, (Note: In the real-life 2024 season, only Max Verstappen won the drivers' championship while McLaren secured the Constructors' title that year.) Konnersport begins their 2025 season with the intent to secure the championship. During the Chinese Grand Prix, after the end of a Safety Car period and with her tyres losing grip due to the two-stop strategy, Callie manages to hold off Lewis Hamilton, finishing on the podium. After the race, Devon initially plans to have Callie replaced to ensure the team's success, but after a debate, Devon decides to let her continue.

During the British Grand Prix weekend, Devon reveals that buying Konnersport for the business nearly caused the bankruptcy of Butler Global, leading Callie to discover that Davidoff had bought the team before his death. During the race itself, both Callie and Liam Lawson get involved in a collision that leads to their retirement from the race. (Note: Based on the incident between Max Verstappen and Lewis Hamilton at the 2021 British Grand Prix) Aiden manages to secure a fourth-place finish, securing more points for the team. At the Italian Grand Prix, Callie discovers that Davidoff, during a meeting with the board, had openly voiced his desire to support her while refusing to sell Konnersport, leading Callie to realise that Davidoff really did care about her. During the race, Aiden is given a drive-through penalty after a skirmish whilst fending off Verstappen.

A few months later, Devon and Andreo make an agreement to switch their position; Devon would become the team principal of Konnersport, while Andreo serves on the board of Butler Global. With the team close to securing their championship at the Abu Dhabi Grand Prix, Casper, who is invited to watch the action, speaks with Devon for the first time since his dismissal.

In the race, Verstappen and Charles Leclerc are involved in an incident that leads to Leclerc's retirement. This allows Aiden or Callie to win the Drivers' Championship, and win Konnersport the Constructors' Championship. After the celebration, Aiden or Callie reflect on their winning the championship alongside Devon and Andreo, while Casper states that he will continue his focus on being a father and husband.

== Development and release ==
Prior to the reveal, F1 25 logos were already present in Formula One's 2025 race graphics. On 25 March 2025, Lewis Hamilton was announced to be the driver in the cover image for the 'Iconic Edition' of the game, boasting his red Ferrari overalls, and announced a reveal date of 26 May. The standard edition of the game features Oscar Piastri of McLaren, Carlos Sainz Jr. of Williams and Oliver Bearman of Haas, and their respective cars, on the cover image, marking the first time since F1 2015 and 2016 that Williams and Haas drivers, respectively, are present on the cover. The game also features the livery of the fictional APXGP team, as it appears in the F1 film alongside scenarios inspired by the film that players can undertake. The player also has the option of signing the characters from either Braking Point 3 or F1 in MyTeam, as well as racing against the fictional Konnersport and APXGP teams in the driver career mode.

F1 25 is the first entry in the series not to be released on eighth-generation consoles since F1 2014, with the series turning its focus on ninth-generation consoles. It was released on PlayStation 5, Microsoft Windows, and Xbox Series X/S on 30 May 2025, with players who ordered the Iconic Edition granted three-day access beginning on 27 May 2025. In Australia, the game was additionally released in physical format on the PlayStation 5 on 10 June.

=== 2026 DLC expansion package ===
In a first for the series, it was called F1 25 would receive a 2026 season DLC expansion package as opposed to a bespoke new Formula One game based on the 2026 Formula One World Championship being developed and released. This breaks the cycle of yearly releases and marks the first time more than one season is represented in an F1 title since F1 2015. EA Sports revealed on 18 November 2025 that it chose this path in order to develop a new game from scratch for 2027. Lee Mather, Senior Creative Director at Codemasters, stated that "with Formula 1's momentum on and off the track, now is the perfect time for us to look ahead and build for the future."

On 18 May 2026, the key art for the DLC was released, with the official reveal taking place on 20 May. The F1 2026 cars were implemented within modes such as Grand Prix, Multiplayer and Time Trial.

== Reception ==
Reception

Aggregate scores
Aggregator	Score
Metacritic	(PC) 81/100 (PS5) 80/100 (XSXS) 82/100
OpenCritic	84% recommend

Review scores
Publication	Score
Hardcore Gamer	4/5
IGN	8/10
PC Gamer (US)	74/100
PCGamesN	8/10
Push Square	7/10
Shacknews	7/10
The Guardian	4/5

F1 25 received "generally favorable" reviews, according to review aggregator website Metacritic. Fellow review aggregator OpenCritic assessed that the game received strong approval, being recommended by 84% of critics.

The game was nominated for "Best Sports/Racing Game" at The Game Awards 2025, as well as for "Racing Game of the Year" at the 29th Annual D.I.C.E. Awards, but did not win for either.

=== Awards ===
Year	Award	Category	Result	Ref.
2025	The Game Awards 2025	Best Sports/Racing Game	Nominated	
2026	The Steam Awards 2025	VR Game of the Year	Nominated	
2026	29th Annual D.I.C.E. Awards	Racing Game of the Year	Nominated	
