= Art Academy =

Edutainment video game series

- Genre: Edutainment
- Developers: Headstrong Games, Nintendo SPD
- Publisher: Nintendo
- First release: Art Academy; September 14, 2009
- Latest release: Disney Art Academy; May 13, 2016

Art Academy is a series of edutainment video games beginning in 2009 with Art Academy. Its most recent release was Disney Art Academy. One of Nintendo's franchises, the series has been released on Nintendo DS, Nintendo 3DS and Wii U.

== Gameplay ==
The games in the series are training simulations that teach players to draw.

== Games ==
Release timeline
2009	Art Academy
2010
2011
2012	Art Academy: Lessons for Everyone!
2013	Art Academy: SketchPad
2014	Pokémon Art Academy
2015	Art Academy: Home Studio
2016	Disney Art Academy

=== Art Academy ===
Art Academy, also known as Art Academy: Learn painting and drawing techniques with step-by-step training in the PAL regions and Artistic Taste Classroom DS (Note: Japanese: 絵心教室DS, Hepburn: Egokoro kyōshitsu DS) in Japan, is an art training software for the Nintendo DS handheld game console. It was developed by Headstrong Games, and published by Nintendo. Art Academy was originally a two-part training application only available for download via the DSiWare service since 2009. It was later re-released in 2010 as a fully compiled, retail-able DS Game Card with added features, thus also making it available for original Nintendo DS and Nintendo DS Lite users.

=== Art Academy: Lessons for Everyone! ===
Art Academy: Lessons for Everyone!, entitled New Art Academy in Europe and Australia is a 2012 video game for the Nintendo 3DS. It is a sequel to Art Academy for the Nintendo DS. This game is the first in the series to include DLC.

=== Art Academy: SketchPad ===
Art Academy: SketchPad was a Wii U eShop app released in 2013 that allowed players to make more detailed drawings than would normally be allowed on Miiverse. It was planned to include drawing lessons as well.

=== Art Academy: Home Studio ===
Art Academy: Home Studio, also known as Art Academy: Atelier in PAL regions, was the fourth main entry in the series, released in 2015, and the first one on home consoles. A more full-featured version of the SketchPad app, it contains more lessons.

=== Pokémon Art Academy ===
Pokémon Art Academy is an educational drawing video game developed by Headstrong Games, published by Nintendo for the Nintendo 3DS. It is a spin-off of the Art Academy series featuring characters from the Pokémon media franchise, and was released in Europe and Australia in July 2014, and North America in October. The game was made available as both a retail and downloadable release from the Nintendo eShop, and is the first 3DS title with built-in Miiverse support for sharing artwork.

=== Disney Art Academy ===
Disney Art Academy is an educational art training video game developed by Headstrong Games, published by Nintendo and released for the Nintendo 3DS handheld game console. It is a spin-off of the Art Academy series centered on Disney and Pixar characters. The game was released in 2016 for North America in May, and for Europe and Australia in July.
