= Hammerhead =

Hammerhead may refer to:

- The head of a hammer

== Commercial ==
- Hammerhead (company), a subsidiary of SRAM Corporation

== Fiction ==
- Hammerhead (character), a Marvel Comics foe of Spider-Man
- Hammerhead (film), a 1968 film based on the novel by James Mayo
- Hammerhead: Shark Frenzy a 2005 TV movie starring William Forsythe, Jeffery Combs and Hunter Tylo
- Hammerhead (1987 film), a 1987 Italian action film directed by Enzo G. Castellari
- Hammerhead (novel), a 1964 Charles Hood secret agent novel by James Mayo
- Hammerhead Hannigan, the leader of Taurus Bulba's henchmen in the television cartoon series Darkwing Duck
- Hammerhead, a Rulon character from the TV cartoon Dino-Riders
- Hammerhead, the nickname for the Star Wars character Momaw Nadon
- Hammerheads, a 1990 book by Dale Brown
- James Bond 007: Hammerhead, a 2016 James Bond comic book by Dynamite Entertainment

== Games and rides ==
- Hammerhead, a heavy helicopter gunship in the video game Command & Conquer 3: Kane's Wrath
- Hammer Heads, a 2006 computer game from Pop Cap Games
- Hammerhead (attraction), a former ride at Knott's Berry Farm, now defunct
- Hammerhead, a monster truck present in various titles of the Twisted Metal series of video games
- Hammerhead, the most prominent gas station and repair shop in the game Final Fantasy XV

== Music ==
- Hammerhead (band), noise rock band
- Hammerhead (EP), a 2006 EP by Solace, or the title track
- "Hammerhead" (James Reyne song), 1987
- "Hammerhead" (Jeff Beck song), 2010
- "Hammerhead" (The Offspring song), 2008
- "Hammerhead", a song by Flotsam and Jetsam from the 1986 album Doomsday for the Deceiver
- "Hammerhead", a song by John Zorn from the 1990 album Naked City
- "Hammerhead", a song by Overkill from the 1985 album Feel the Fire
- "Hammerhead", an instrumental by Pat Travers from the 1978 album Heat in the Street
- "Hammerhead", a song by Tin Machine, from the 1991 album Tin Machine II
- "Hammerhead", a song by !!! from !!!, 2000
- "Hammerhead", an instrumental by The Shadows from the 1984 album Guardian Angel

== Science and technology ==
- Hammerhead shark (genus Sphyrna), of which there are nine known species
- Hammerkop (Scopus umbretta), a bird of order Ciconiiformes, may also be known as a hammerhead
- Hammerhead worm (genus Bipalium)
- Hammer-headed bat (Hypsignathus monstrosus)
- Doto amyra, hammerhead sea slug
- Hammerhead ribozyme, which can catalyze the sequence-specific cleavage of RNA phosphodiester bonds
- Aldehyde oxidase and xanthine dehydrogenase, a/b hammerhead domain
- Hammerhead crane, a type of crane
- Hammerhead turn or stall turn, an aerobatic maneuver
- Google Nexus 5, an Android handset with the code name Hammerhead

== Sports ==
- Jupiter Hammerheads, a minor league baseball team based in Jupiter, Florida
- Wilmington Hammerheads FC, a minor league soccer team based in Wilmington, North Carolina
- Corpus Christi Hammerheads, a professional arena football team
- Hammerhead (mascot), mascot of the British football club West Ham United

== United States Military ==
- USS Hammerhead (SS-364), a Gato-class submarine, commissioned in 1944
- USS Hammerhead (SSN-663), a Sturgeon-class submarine, commissioned in 1968 and struck in 1995
- Hammerhead (mine), an anti-submarine naval mine
- M901 ITV, aka "Hammerhead", an armored TOW missile launcher used by the US Army
