= Dead City =

Dead City may refer to:

- Dead City (film), a 1951 Greek film
- A song from the 1997 Patti Smith album Peace and Noise
- Minas Morgul, also known as "The Dead City", a fortress from Lord of the Rings universe
- A video game by Com2uS
- The Walking Dead: Dead City, a The Walking Dead spinoff series

== See also ==
- Dead Cities
- The City of the Dead (disambiguation)
- Ghost town, a type of city that could be considered "dead"
