= Bogdan Raczynski =

Polish-American electronic musician

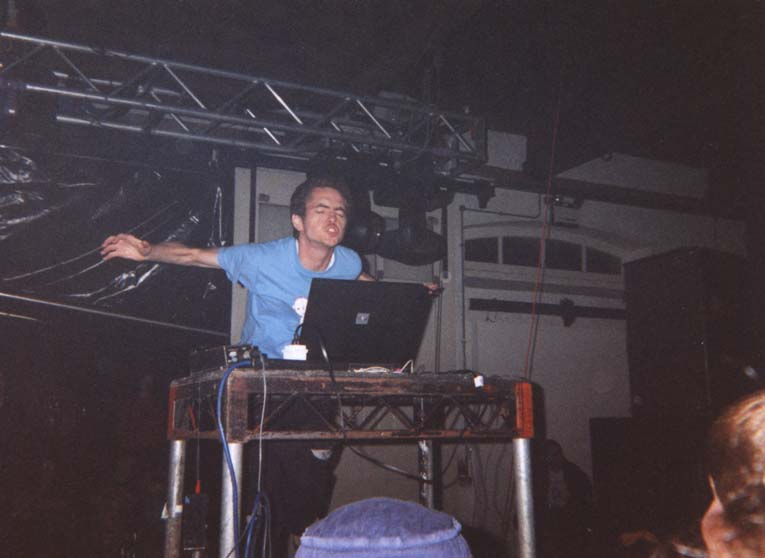
- Bogdan Raczynski performing live in 2000 at the Warp Lighthouse Party, London.

Background information
- Born: Bogdan W. Raczynski; 1977 (age 48–49); Poland
- Genres: Drill 'n' bass; braindance; IDM; drum and bass; electronica; jungle
- Occupations: Musician, DJ
- Years active: 1994–present
- Labels: Rephlex Records, Disciples, Planet Mu
- Website: bogdanraczynski.com

Bogdan W. Raczynski (born 1977) is a Polish-American electronic musician. Associated with the intelligent dance music (IDM) movement, Raczynski counts jungle, hardcore and traditional Polish music among his inspirations.

Raczynski's early recordings were created using music tracker programs such as Impulse Tracker, and he participated with tracker-focused netlabels such as the Kosmic Free Music Foundation. Raczynski's post-netlabel albums were released on Rephlex Records until its closure in 2014. Rephlex founder Richard D. James cited Raczynski as an inspiration for tracks on his album Drukqs. His work includes remixes of Björk and Ulver.

== Biography ==
Raczynski was born in Poland and emigrated to rural Nebraska with his family at the age of 7. He attended art school in Japan, but dropped out and eventually became homeless, living on the streets of Tokyo or in friends' homes. He sent a demo of Boku Mo Wakaran to Rephlex Records before returning to his parents' home in the United States. After signing with Rephlex, he spent the next four years moving between England, Ireland, the United States, and Canada due to visa issues.

== Discography ==
=== Albums ===
- Boku Mo Wakaran (1999)
- Samurai Math Beats (1999)
- Thinking of You (2000)
- MyLoveILove (2001)
- 96 Drum 'n' Bass Classixxx (2002)
- Renegade Platinum Mega Dance Attack Party: Don the Plates (2003)
- Alright! (2007)
- Rave 'Till You Cry (2019)
- ADDLE (2022)
- You're Only Young Once But You Can Be Stupid Forever (2024)
- Slow Down Stupid (2025)

=== EPs ===
- Ibiza Anthems Vol. 4 (2000)
- Muzyka Dla Imigrantów (2001)
- I Will Eat Your Children Too! (2003)
- Debt EP (2020)
- BANANS (2021)

=== Remixes ===
- Autechre – "EP7/Envane", on Warp 10+3 (1999)
- Ulver – "Bog's Basil & Curry Powder Potatos Recipe", on 1993–2003: 1st Decade in the Machines (2003)
- Björk – "Who Is It (Shooting Stars & Asteroids Mix)" (2005)

=== Video game music ===
- Nucleus – Soundtrack (2007)
