= Art Academy (video game) =

- North American DS box art
- Developer: Headstrong Games
- Publisher: Nintendo
- Director: Tancred Dyke-Wells
- Producers: Kensuke Tanabe; Keisuke Terasaki
- Composer: James Hannigan
- Series: Art Academy
- Platforms: Nintendo DS, DSiWare, Nintendo 3DS, Wii U
- Release: DSiWare; First Semester: NA: September 14, 2009; JP: November 18, 2009; PAL: December 25, 2009; DSiWare; Second Semester: NA: September 28, 2009; JP: November 18, 2009; PAL: January 8, 2010; Nintendo DS: JP: June 19, 2010; EU: August 6, 2010; AU: September 23, 2010; KOR: October 14, 2010; NA: October 25, 2010; Nintendo 3DS: EU: July 28, 2012; AU: August 23, 2012; JP: September 13, 2012; NA: October 1, 2012; Wii U: JP: August 8, 2013; WW: August 9, 2013
- Genre: Art training game (edutainment video game)
- Mode: Single-player

Art Academy, also known as Art Academy: Learn painting and drawing techniques with step-by-step training in the PAL regions and Artistic Taste Classroom DS (Note: Japanese: 絵心教室DS, Hepburn: Egokoro kyōshitsu DS) in Japan, is an art training software for the Nintendo DS. It was developed by Headstrong Games and published by Nintendo. Art Academy was originally a two-part training application only available for download via the DSiWare service since 2009. It was later re-released in 2010 as a fully compiled, retail-able DS Game Card with added features, thus also making it available for original Nintendo DS and Nintendo DS Lite users.

The original DSiWare applications are known as Art Academy: First Semester and Art Academy: Second Semester. Each one has six and four lessons respectively, and both DSiWare applications are worth 800 Nintendo DSi Points each. Art Academy: First Semester and Second Semester were released in North America on September 14 and 28, 2009 respectively, and in the PAL regions on December 25, 2009 and January 8, 2010 respectively. In Japan both DSiWare applications were released on November 18, 2009 as Fairly Authentic Artistic Taste Classroom: First Semester (Note: Japanese: わりと本格的 絵心教室 前期, Hepburn: Wari to honkaku-teki eigokoro kyōshitsu zenki) and Fairly Authentic Artistic Taste Classroom: Second Semester. (Note: Japanese: わりと本格的 絵心教室 後期, Hepburn: Wari to honkaku-teki eigokoro kyōshitsu kōki)

The full, retail version includes all ten lessons, plus minor additional features, extra mini-lessons, and an image library for art subject references. The retail version of Art Academy was released in Japan on June 19, 2010, in Europe on August 6, in Australia on September 23, and in North America on October 25. Art Academy is part of Nintendo's Touch! Generations brand. Art Academy received a direct sequel for the Nintendo 3DS titled Art Academy: Lessons for Everyone!, which was released in North America and Europe in October 2012. A new installment to the series was released on the Wii U's eShop in August 2013, called Art Academy: SketchPad, which gives users the chance to share their creations on Miiverse. Art Academy: Home Studio or Art Academy: Atelier in PAL regions was released on the Wii U in June 2015.

== Gameplay ==
The following is based mainly on the retail version of Art Academy, but will note anything to do with the original DSiWare versions if necessary.

Art Academy is advertised as an art training simulation which can teach and help anyone to develop their art skills and techniques that can be applied with real-life tools and materials. Art Academy also features a realistic, albeit limited, range of art tools which can be freely used whichever way the game's user, as a player or art trainee, deems to. Although it was made for the Nintendo DS, Art Academy is not a real "game" per se, and so it does not feature any actual gameplay, but it does feature a mode which requires any user of Art Academy to progress through in order to unlock higher levels, similarly to most games. The game, however, features two modes of play: Lessons and Free Paint mode.

=== Modes ===
Lessons mode is the main feature of Art Academy, as it the actual line of art tutorials which the player/art trainee must progress through in order to unlock more advanced levels or lessons. There are ten main lessons in all.

Lessons mode also comes with a tutor: a character called Vince, who is an old artist himself. Vince guides the player/art trainee throughout the lessons, instructing him or her step-by-step through the offered lessons. In the beginning of Lessons mode, if the player/art trainee is playing Art Academy for the first time, they only have access to the first lesson and can only use pencils. As the player/art trainee finishes each lesson through all of its stages, their progress will unlock the next lesson. Some lessons even feature one or two mini-lessons (written as Minilesson in-game), which helps the player/art trainee further with the skills taught in the main lesson. These mini lessons can only be unlocked if the player went fully went through the main lesson. There are ten mini lessons available, but only seven of these are in the original DSiWare versions of Art Academy. If the player/art trainee wishes, they can also repeat any previously unlocked lessons. Lessons features three save slots, which help the player/art trainee to save progress at any time during any of the lessons, should they need a break from the lessons or Art Academy entirely. In Lessons, the player/art trainee is given the opportunity to save any art pieces they accomplished during the lessons in a designated Gallery in Art Academy, or on the Nintendo DSi Camera Album, in case of the original DSiWare versions.

Unlike most games, as well as other particular teaching software, Art Academy does not grade the player's/art trainee's performance in accomplishing any of the lessons, as it fully depends on the player/art trainee if they are willing to follow the guides and/or practical training. Lessons can be unlocked anyway regardless of performance, as long as the player/art trainee simply passes through the stages to finish up each lesson. In fact, practical training is absolutely open (only limited by unlocked tools as stated per lesson), as the player/art trainee does not even have to follow the actual lesson at all.

The other mode is called Free Paint. In Free Paint mode, the player/art trainee is offered the ability to draw or paint anything they deem worth painting, and can even save their art progress for keeping or to be worked on later. Unlike Lessons, Free Paint mode allows full accessibility for all the available art tools in Art Academy from the start. The player/art trainee even need not access Lessons mode at all to use Free Paint mode. Like Lessons though, the player/art trainee has three available save slots (independent from Lessons mode) to save their work-in-progress art pieces to be edited later, and can also save their finalized pieces in the Gallery (or the Nintendo DSi Camera Album for DSiWare versions). In Free Paint, the player/art trainee also has access to a designated Image Library implemented in Art Academy. The Image Library includes a categorized selection of 89 photographs which the player/art trainee can use as references and art subjects. However, the pictures in the library cannot be moved or edited in any way. Alternatively, the player/art trainee can also refer to drawings and photographs (additional information below) stored in the Gallery. The Image Library is not available on the original DSiWare versions, but the DSiWare versions can still refer to pictures found in the DSi Camera Album.

When final drawings/paintings are saved, the player/art trainee has the option to add a frame design surrounding the final layout. There are 20 available frame designs (10 in the DSiWare versions). Art pieces, whether in the Gallery or DSi Camera Album, can no longer be edited once saved.

=== Additional features ===
Art Academy supports the use of the camera features on the Nintendo DSi and Nintendo DSi XL. If the game was used with any of these consoles there would be a Camera option available on the main menu, which can be utilized to capture photographs using the DSi cameras, and store them directly in the Gallery. The DSiWare versions do not support the camera feature, at least, not directly, since these versions already refer to the Nintendo DSi Camera Album, which supports use of the cameras anyway. If the Game Card is used on the Nintendo DS or Nintendo DS Lite, the Camera option would not appear at all, although these consoles can still view any photographs available in the Gallery, if the Game Card had been used with Nintendo DSi (XL) prior to inserting in the former consoles.

The retail version of Art Academy has a designated Gallery where the player/art trainee can save any art piece they had finalized during Lessons or Free Paint mode, as well as any photographs taken with the DSi cameras. The Gallery can only store up to 82 pictures combined inside the Game Card, regardless whether it is a drawing/painting or a photograph. However, pictures in the Gallery cannot be transferred or saved elsewhere. If the Gallery is full, and the player/art trainee wishes to store any new picture, they are required to delete any available picture which is already saved in the Gallery. The ability to store directly on the Game Card is convenient for original Nintendo DS and DS Lite users, but it is a disadvantage for Nintendo DSi (XL) users, especially since the DSiWare versions of Art Academy can store as many pictures as long as there is available memory in the DSi Camera Album, which can be transferred to SD cards and/or can be exported to Facebook. The Gallery has a Slide Show option to show off any pictures available in the Gallery, accompanied with music.

There is also a Demo option available on the main menu of Art Academy. The purpose of the Demo is to allow the player/art trainee to try an extra lesson offered in Art Academy, or to wirelessly send the same extra lesson to another local Nintendo DS console via DS Download Play, so that another user can try a demo version of Art Academy. This same Demo lesson is also permanently offered via Nintendo Channel, but this is currently only for PAL version Wii consoles. The Demo option is not available on the DSiWare versions.

=== Art tools ===
Compared to most raster image-editing software, Art Academy has a limited selection of tools, although they emulate their realistic-counterparts well. These tools includes three pencil levels (2H, HB, 2B) in point or flat methods, an eraser in edge or flat methods, round and flat paint brush sets available in three sizes each, a color paint palette that comes with a color mixing tray, a water jar, a color wheel reference, primary colors, secondary colors, and as well as black and white colors. The color palette is capable of mixing any of the available colors together to produce hundreds of color combinations. There is also a grid tool, and a zoom feature.

The player/art trainee can use the stylus and touch screen to draw and paint, while the top screen is usually reserved for the target art subjects.

=== Characters ===
Vince is an art tutor who provides the player/art trainee with step-by-step lessons through each stage, and is most helpful towards novice artists. His teaching methods include explaining the drawing and painting techniques, describing how each available art tool should be used, elaborating on methods, styles, and certain art tools technically and historically. Sometimes showing off finished examples and comprehensible references, Vince also draws before his students to illustrate how each step in every stage of every lesson is practically done before giving them the chance to try it out themselves. Vince's character is inspired by real life artist Vincent van Gogh. Vince appears as an Assist Trophy in Super Smash Bros. Ultimate, in which he creates different artworks on the opponents to blind their views of the characters.

Bacon is Vince's pet dog. He often appears during a loading screen, as he is also visible in the game's animated title card. Despite being a minor character, Bacon appears as the art subject of the eighth lesson in Lessons mode.

== Reception ==
Reception

Aggregate score
Aggregator	Score
Metacritic	75/100

Review scores
Publication	Score
Eurogamer	7/10
IGN	6.5/10
Nintendo Life	7/10
Nintendo World Report	9/10

Art Academy received "generally favorable reviews" according to the review aggregator site Metacritic, based on the reviews from 15 critics.

== Sequels and spin-offs ==
Art Academy was followed by several sequels and spin-offs in the series. The first sequel is Art Academy: Lessons for Everyone! for Nintendo 3DS (titled New Art Academy for Europe). It was released in 2012 for Japan in September, for North America in October, for Europe in July and in Australia in August. Two Wii U sequels were released in 2013 and 2015, respectively: Art Academy: Sketchpad and Art Academy: Home Studio. A Pokémon-themed spin-off crossover, Pokémon Art Academy, was released in 2014 for Japan in June, for Europe and New Zealand in July, and for North America in October. The game features 40 art lessons ranging from easy to hard. It also uses the 3DS Camera, to take images for reference while drawing. Art can also be posted onto Miiverse. A Disney-centered spin-off called Disney Art Academy, which features 80 art lessons based on the various works of Disney and Pixar, was released in 2016 for Japan in April, for North America in May, and for Europe and Australia in July.

== Legacy ==
Vince appears as a collectible trophy in Super Smash Bros. for Wii U. He later becomes an Assist Trophy character in the next game of the series, Ultimate. In addition, the Swan Lesson theme by James Hannigan is a track that plays on the Duck Hunt stage in Super Smash Bros. for Wii U.
