= Conspiracy: Weapons of Mass Destruction =

2005 video game

- Developer: Kuju Entertainment
- Publisher: Oxygen Interactive
- Producers: James Brooksby; Simeon Pashley
- Artist: James Methuen
- Platforms: PlayStation 2, Windows, Xbox
- Release: PlayStation 2, Windows: GER: May 19, 2005; UK: June 10, 2005; Xbox: FRA: July 29, 2005; GER: August 17, 2005; UK: August 19, 2005
- Genre: First-person shooter
- Mode: Single-player

Conspiracy: Weapons of Mass Destruction is a 2005 first-person shooter game developed by Kuju Entertainment and published by Oxygen Interactive. The game was released on PlayStation 2, Windows, and Xbox. In Russia it is the 4th installment of the Marine Against Terrorism series, called Морпех против терроризма 4: Гидра должна умереть (Marine Against Terrorism 4: Hydra Must Die)

== Story ==
Cole Justice, a retired Secret Service agent, has faithfully served the United States government as an agent in the most important missions of the 80's. They were and still are the best in the business. Recent intelligence reports show that the secret organization - dubbed Hydra - has become a serious threat to their own government. The CIA firmly believes that Hydra has been developing chemical and biological weapons over the past few years and is now attempting to sell them to terrorist groups operating worldwide.

== Censorship ==
The German PC and Xbox versions of the game had blood removed from the game. Bodies in the game also did not burn from grenades.

== Reception ==
Conspiracy: Weapons of Mass Destruction was received mostly negatively by critics and players alike according to MobyGames. Eurogamer stated that the game "got more laughable the further it progressed.[...] Conspiracy really doesn't even try to bring anything new at all to the FPS table. As in, nothing new since the early days of the PS One." German GamePro thinks the game is "just a standard FPS" and "It does everything wrong that can possibly be done wrong". PC Zone said "There's no option to up the screen resolution from 640x480, the death sequence is dull and the graphics are shit." Jeuxvideo.com compared the game to a yo mama joke. The game appeared No.87 at TripleJumps 101 Worst Videogames of all time list.

Publication	Score
Gamestar (Germany)	17%
GamePro (Germany)	30%
Eurogamer UK	1/10
Maniac.de	40/100
PC Zone	1.2/10
Jeuxvideo.com (FR)	5/20
PlayFrance	2/10
IC Games	23/79
