= Disney Art Academy =

2016 video game

- North American 3DS cover art
- Developer: Headstrong Games
- Publisher: Nintendo
- Director: Tancred Dyke-Wells
- Producers: Glendon Dphrepaulezz; Toyokazu Nonaka
- Designer: Justin Cheadle
- Programmer: Django Verbaant
- Artist: Jason Howard
- Composer: Masaru Tajima
- Series: Art Academy
- Platform: Nintendo 3DS
- Release: NA: May 13, 2016; EU: July 15, 2016; AU: July 16, 2016
- Genre: Edutainment
- Mode: Single-player

Disney Art Academy is an educational art training video game developed by Headstrong Games, published by Nintendo and released for the Nintendo 3DS handheld game console. It is a spin-off of the Art Academy series centered on Disney and Pixar characters. The game was released in May 2016 for North America, and for Europe and Australia in July.

Disney Art Academy was delisted from the Nintendo eShop in March 2021.

== Gameplay ==
The gameplay is similar to other Art Academy games. Players are taught how to draw various characters from Disney and Pixar films in 40 step-by-step lessons. The game also uses the wireless communication function of the Nintendo 3DS by allowing players to send a demo of the game to each other.

== Reception ==
Reception

Aggregate score
Aggregator	Score
OpenCritic	27% recommend

Reviews for the game were mixed. On Metacritic, the game has a weighted average score of 72/100 based on reviews from 16 critics, indicating "mixed or average reviews". Critics were positive on the game's ability to teach how to draw familiar Disney characters, but criticized its slow pace and overall lack of offering beyond its premise.
