= All Zombies Must Die! =

2011 video game

- Developer: Doublesix
- Publisher: Square Enix
- Engine: Unreal Engine 3
- Platforms: Microsoft Windows, PlayStation 3, Xbox 360
- Release: NA: December 27, 2011; EU: January 4, 2012
- Genres: Shooter, action-adventure
- Modes: Single-player, multiplayer

All Zombies Must Die! is a top-down shooter action-adventure video game for up to four players. The game was released as a downloadable title for the PlayStation 3 and Xbox 360 video game consoles and Microsoft Windows. It is the spiritual successor to Burn Zombie Burn.

== Gameplay ==
Players choose one of four characters; Jack, his ex-girlfriend Rachel, the Rastafarian alien Luxo or the scientist Bryan. Each of the characters has a different secondary attack in addition to their equipped weapon. The game is set in the fictional town of Deadhill, where a zombie apocalypse has occurred. Players must complete quests, gather items and fight the zombie horde with limited ammunition. Game locations include the suburbs, a shopping mall and the town centre.

The game uses a dual analogue stick control system, one stick is used to move the player's character, the other is used to aim the character's weapon. The game has light role-playing elements, such as quests and item creation. Players choose which quests they undertake, allowing non-linear progression and exploration within the game world.

Players increase their character's level by defeating enemies and collecting items. Items are located in containers such as bins and cupboards. The chosen character can be levelled-up at bases, which also serve as hubs for weapon modifications, for instance allowing the player to create electrified melee weapons.

== Reception ==
Reception

Aggregate scores
Aggregator	Score		
Aggregator	PC	PS3	Xbox 360
GameRankings		67.94%	61.09%
Metacritic	56/100	67/100	60/100

Review scores
Publication	Score		
Publication	PC	PS3	Xbox 360
Eurogamer			5/10
IGN		6.5/10	
