= Thinking of You (Bogdan Raczynski album) =

Studio album by Bogdan Raczynski
- Released: April 10, 2000
- Genre: Drill 'n' bass, IDM
- Length: 37:28
- Label: Rephlex Records

Bogdan Raczynski chronology
Ibiza Anthems volume 4 (2000)	Thinking of You (2000)	Muzyka Dla Imigrantów (2001)

Professional ratings
Review scores
Source	Rating
AllMusic	3/5 stars
NME	3.5/5 stars
Pitchfork	6.6/10

Thinking of You is a studio album by Bogdan Raczynski. It was released on Rephlex Records in April 2000.

== Track listing ==
No.	Title	Length
1.	"All I Want Is to Be by Your Side but You Don't Care"	4:35
2.	"I Saw You, with Your Heart, Looking at Me"	4:22
3.	"Fuck You DJ"	4:18
4.	"Thinking of You Thinking of Me"	0:59
5.	"You as an Out-of-Control Extension of Me"	4:16
6.	"Unsatisfied Consumer"	6:10
7.	"Riot"	0:27
8.	"Domesticated Violence"	4:07
9.	"There Are Many Things I Don't Understand but I Knew That I Loved You (But It's Too Late, You've Taken Me for Granted)"	3:04
10.	"That First Time I Met Her and She Hugged Me (And Then Laughed at Me Heartlessly When I Said I Wanted to Know What It Meant to Love Her)"	3:24
11.	"You Broke My Heart, Now You Must Play the Part When You Come Running Back for Me"	1:46
