= Tank Racer =

1999 video game

- Cover art for Tank Racer
- Developers: Glass Ghost, Simis
- Publishers: Grolier Interactive, R&P Electronic Media
- Composers: Daniel "Bay Tremore" Botschinsky; Tomi "D-Tour" Korkalainen; Joonas "Substance" Vahamaki; Jani "Waterloop" Niiranen; Keith "Vim!" Baylis; Jouni "Dharma" Helminen; Andi "Ramone" Horvath
- Platforms: Microsoft Windows, PlayStation
- Release: March 30, 1999
- Genres: Racing, vehicular combat
- Modes: Single-player, multiplayer

Tank Racer is a 3D action racing computer and video game developed by the Glass Ghost team at Simis and published by Grolier Interactive, copyrighted in 1998 and released on March 30 1999.

== Gameplay ==
Screenshot of one of the levels.

There are four different play modes to choose from: Cup Mode, Single Race Mode, Multi-player Battle Mode, and Multi-player Racing Mode.

=== Cup Mode ===
In Cup Mode the player's aim is to win all three "cups" in the World Tank Racing Championship (WTRC). Each cup has its own four tanks for the player to choose from, and one secret tank that is unlocked upon completion of the cup (making a total of 15 playable tanks in the game). There are 8 different tracks, although some of them are reused meaning there are a total of 15 races.

Upon completion of each cup, "bonuses" are unlocked. These include three tanks, a music player (which lets the player choose any of the songs from the soundtrack to listen to), the ability to re-watch the 'outro' videos for each cup, special game settings (which includes 'overhead view', 'dual control', a 'hover tank', the option to change the sound effects to 'human voices' and 'guitar squeal') and three 'secret' mini arcade games (a one or two-player Pong clone with tanks called "Ping"; a one-player top-down view maze tank game called "Tank 2001", the name of which might allude to the Arcadia 2001 game console; and a one-player Asteroids clone, called "Space Tank", again with a tank).

=== Single Race Mode ===
Single Race Mode is similar to the Cup Mode, the difference being the player can play any race they choose to (as long as they have already completed that race within the Cup Mode system), and of course it's just a single race.

=== Multi-player Battle Mode and Multi-player Racing Mode ===
In Battle Mode the player can battle other players in one of eight special battle arenas (some of which are based on the racing arenas, and some of which are unique). How many "cups" the player has won in Cup Mode affects the speed of the tanks and the power-ups. Each tank has an energy/health bar, and when this is depleted, the game is over for that player.

The multi-player Racing Mode lets players race against each other on 6 tracks. There is also a Catch-up mode to help less experienced players.

The main difference between the PC and PlayStation releases is in the Multi-player modes. On the PC edition up to 6 players can take part in a race or battle over LAN or "direct IP", whereas on the PlayStation edition it's a maximum of two players using a split screen.

The game features ten Drum and bass music tracks by artists Ramone and Trigger, Waterloop, Substance, D-Tour, Bay Tremore, Vim! and Dharma.

== Reception ==
The UK Official PlayStation Magazine gave the PlayStation version 6 out of 10, describing the "novelty racing game" as having a "Casanova charm" with a "fun-filled soul".

IGN gave the game 5.2 out of 10, calling it mediocre and saying that "There's some original thought here but not enough to make the game deserve much attention."

== Tank Racer (mobile game) ==
Screenshot of one of the tracks in the mobile phone game Tank Racer

A mobile phone game with the same title and similar gameplay (although in 2D) was released by GlobalFun and Runestone Games in February 2005.

In the game the player can choose from a range of six tanks including Bumbleboy, Thor and Power Punch. Like Glass Ghost's game, they have a range of tracks and championships to choose from, and some tracks have hidden shortcuts.
