= Nucleus (video game) =

2007 video game

- PlayStation Store icon
- Developer: Kuju Entertainment
- Publisher: Sony Computer Entertainment
- Composer: Bogdan Raczynski
- Platform: PlayStation 3
- Release: NA: 18 May 2007; EU: 12 July 2007
- Genre: Twin-stick shooter
- Modes: Single-player, multiplayer

Nucleus is a 2007 twin-stick shooter video game developed by Kuju Entertainment and published by Sony Computer Entertainment for the PlayStation 3 It was released on the PlayStation Store. It was released as Bacterius in Japan.

== Gameplay ==
In Nucleus, the player assumes the role of a "remote unit" that is tasked with eliminating viruses inside the human body. They move through the body's three main biological systems, the digestive system, the circulatory system, and finally the nervous system, culminating in a final battle in the brain.

Gameplay consists eliminating of progressively larger and larger viruses, which combine into larger entities when left undisturbed. Each level also has a number of cells which clump together and interact in a physical manner; the players can move them around and manipulate them with a beam to construct barriers to defend against viruses. The main resource available to the player is protein, which is released each time an enemy or a cell is destroyed. If the player accumulates a large enough stockpile of protein, they can utilise a powerful "protein bomb" weapons which eliminate every enemy in the vicinity.

Additionally, the player occasionally fights more powerful nucleus enemies. These boss-type enemies fire spores at cells to turn them into bacteria, and can only be damaged by protein bombs. As the nucleus enemies get damaged they become more and more violent, producing more spore and eventually attacking the player directly. Levels end after a certain condition, which varies. These include destroying a certain amount of viruses, surviving for a set duration, gathering power-ups, or achieving a score target.

The game entities are all physically dynamic, imparting a force on other nearby entities. Cells exert an attractive force on each other, clumping into a tesselating mass and reacting to various forces in the game environment. Exploding protein bombs or angry nuclei exert a large force over a wide area, which can break the cell walls the player has constructed.

The game includes a co-op mode for two players. A patch has been released which offers a new mode of play, Nucleus+, which speeds up the gameplay and modifies and adds new levels.

== Reception ==
Reception

Aggregate score
Aggregator	Score
Metacritic	59/100

Review scores
Publication	Score
Eurogamer	6/10
GameSpot	5.5/10

Video game aggregator site Metacritic stated that the game received "mixed or average" reviews.

Multiple reviewers commented on the game's difficulty, with Ben Kuchera of Ars Technica saying that "if you're not a fan of pants-wetting frustration, you may want to sit this out", and Eurogamer describing its "diamond-hard" difficulty as "rare" in modern gaming. Alex Navarro of GameSpot criticised the "insanely tough later levels" and "dull" gameplay.
