= F1 23 =

2023 racing video game

- Standard edition cover art, featuring from left to right: Mercedes' Lewis Hamilton, Ferrari's Charles Leclerc, and McLaren's Lando Norris.
- Developer: Codemasters
- Publisher: EA Sports
- Composers: Ian Livingstone; Ethan Livingstone; Miktek; Brian Tyler
- Series: F1
- Engine: Ego Engine 4.0
- Platforms: Microsoft Windows; PlayStation 4; PlayStation 5; Xbox One; Xbox Series X/S
- Release: 16 June 2023 (Note: The Champions Edition of the game was released on 13 June 2023.)
- Genre: Racing
- Modes: Single-player, multiplayer

F1 23 is a racing video game developed by Codemasters and published by EA Sports. It is the sixteenth entry in the F1 series by Codemasters. It holds the official licence for the 2023 Formula One and Formula 2 championships. The game was released for Microsoft Windows, PlayStation 4, PlayStation 5, Xbox One, Xbox Series X/S on 16 June, or 3 days earlier on 13 June for users who had previously pre-ordered the Champions Edition, allowing them early access.

== Gameplay ==
F1 23 sees the return of the story mode, "Braking Point", which was introduced in F1 2021. Two characters from "Braking Point", Devon Butler, the main antagonist, and Aiden Jackson, the protagonist, return for Braking Point 2, as well as veteran now-retired driver Casper Akkerman, who also makes an appearance as a mentor and later Team Principal for Konnersport. A new character named Callie Mayer, Devon Butler's sister, makes an appearance, along with their dad, Davidoff Butler who is the CEO of his own company, Butler Global, and Andreo Konner, the founder and owner of Konnersport, who was the team principal in the 2022 season.

F1 23 features overhauled driving physics and added the option to set a 35% race distance. Red flags, which last appeared in F1 2014, make an appearance. The game's UI has been overhauled for an experience much more akin to the presentation of current Formula One races. New additions to the My Team Icons pack include 1992 World Champion Nigel Mansell, W Series driver Jamie Chadwick (who also assisted the developers with Braking Point 2), former Williams driver Pastor Maldonado, and former Toyota reserve driver and Sauber and Caterham driver Kamui Kobayashi. Pre-orders also included characters from Braking Point 2 as icons. Nyck de Vries appeared in the initial game, but was removed from the game after being replaced by Daniel Ricciardo, who took the spot left vacant in the game by de Vries, however, Liam Lawson doesn't appear in the game having deputised for Ricciardo for 5 races after the latter broke his hand at the Dutch Grand Prix. (Note: Lawson does appear in the 2022 F2 roster with Carlin.)

"F1 World" expands upon the "F1 Life" feature of F1 22 and tied together all the game modes featured in the game, including ranked, esports, offline and online game modes. This also includes the return of the Podium Pass. The game introduces a safety rating for online players; similar systems have been featured in titles, such as iRacing and later Gran Turismo titles. This system is also utilised in offline game modes, though an option is available to disable it. The player's "F1 World" car can be upgraded with new car parts, and new team members can be hired. Both items can be obtained through gameplay; while an XP boost is made available with "PitCoin", no microtransactions to purchase such upgrades are available. Goals and compendiums are also available to unlock more rewards in "F1 World". Supercars and a virtual living space make their return from the previous title. Playing game modes, including progression throughout Braking Point 2, count towards Podium Pass progression.

The Lusail International Circuit, home of the Qatar Grand Prix, is included in the game, as is the brand-new Las Vegas Strip Circuit for the inaugural Las Vegas Grand Prix. Lusail still uses the old pit entry that was used for the 2021 race. The game also includes the Imola Circuit of the Emilia Romagna Grand Prix, the Circuit Paul Ricard of the French Grand Prix, the Shanghai International Circuit of the Chinese Grand Prix, and the Algarve International Circuit of the Portuguese Grand Prix, tracks that were removed from or not part of the 2023 schedule.

The game features the ability to switch between a licensed soundtrack, featuring artists such as Swedish House Mafia, Tiësto and The Chemical Brothers, and an orchestral score composed by Ian Livingstone, with an option to hear the game's music through the PA speakers of the in-game racetracks to add a layer of immersion.

== Story mode: Braking Point 2 ==
A sequel to the Braking Point story mode introduced in F1 2021, F1 23 features Braking Point 2, set in the 2022 and 2023 seasons. Drivers Aiden Jackson and Devon Butler, both returning from the first Braking Point, are now teammates at the fictional Konnersport Butler Global Racing Team. Introduced in this story mode is Formula 2 prodigy Callie Mayer (voiced by Emer Kenny), who dreams of earning a shot at motorsport's most prestigious single seater category after winning the Formula 2 championship in the 2021 season with Trident, becoming the first woman to claim the title in doing so. She also happens to be Butler's sister. As revealed in a Deep Dive video published on 22 May 2023, the writing team partnered with three time W Series champion and Williams development driver Jamie Chadwick to bring Mayer's story to life. Both Butler and Jackson retain their race numbers of 71 and 89 respectively, while Mayer uses 66 during her stint in Formula One (20 as a Trident driver).

Aiden's former teammate and now-retired driver, Casper Akkerman, also returns in the first ‘’Braking Point’’ with him acting as Callie's mentor in the 2022 F2 Season before becoming the team principal of Konnersport Butler Global Racing Team in the 2023 F1 Season.

Other new characters are Andreo Konner, the founder, CEO and team owner of Konnersport, as well as being the team principal of Konnersport in the 2022 F1 season and Devon and Callie's father, Davidoff Butler, the CEO Of Butler Global, the main sponsor Konnersport.

=== Plot ===
In the 2022 season, after failing to sign an agreement with several teams, Aiden Jackson signs with the Konnersport Butler Global Racing Team, a team founded by Andreo Konner and funded by Butler Global, a company owned by Davidoff Butler, father to Devon Butler. During the Miami Grand Prix, Jackson's car loses power, forcing him to retire, while Devon secures some points for the team. At the Hungarian Grand Prix, Butler ignores the team order to give Jackson the position, but Jackson manages to overtake Butler and finishes the race ahead of him. Jackson later faces more difficulties when he faces a slow pit stop at the Japanese Grand Prix, leading him to consider leaving the team. Meanwhile, Callie Mayer becomes the first woman to win the F2 Championship after finishing her season with Trident with the help of retired driver and Jackson's former teammate, Casper Akkerman.

In the 2023 season, Akkerman is appointed the new team principal of Konnersport, while Konner steps down and stays with the team, as does Jackson to continue racing with the team for another season. Devon, meanwhile, faces difficulties when he loses his focus and ignores team orders. Akkerman attempts to help Devon, but during the Emilia Romagna Grand Prix, (Note: The real-life 2023 Emilia Romagna Grand Prix was not held due to the flooding in the region.) Devon loses his focus again and crashes his car into the barriers (Note: Devon's crash shares a similar fashion to how Charles Leclerc hit the barriers at the real-life 2022 event.) and immediately leaves Konnersport, retiring from racing. Akkerman later reveals that Devon was diagnosed with tinnitus before the season and had kept it secret from the team. As it enters mid-season, Konnersport is forced to scramble to find a new driver, and Davidoff says that Butler Global will pull funding if Konnersport does not finish fifth or higher. Akkerman later chooses to sign Callie as Devon's replacement. Despite Davidoff initially hesitating to let Callie join the team due to a conflict with her and her mother, Evelyn Mayer, he eventually agrees. Callie is equally reluctant at first, but agrees to take Devon's seat.

During her debut in the Azerbaijan Grand Prix, Mayer makes contact with Jackson after an unsuccessful attempt at letting his teammate through. Callie goes on to finish the race. Believing that the collision was deliberate, Aiden is so annoyed by what happened in Baku that in the British Grand Prix, he impedes Callie and refuses to let her past, only to watch her overtake him anyway. After the race, Konner and Akkerman later tell Aiden and Callie about the funding situation and that Konnersport will not be able to find a new investor and will be forced to leave Formula One after 2023 if they do not finish fifth or higher in the Constructors' Championship.

At the Italian Grand Prix, Devon returns to Konnersport as the new team liaison. In the race, Aiden makes contact with Callie, causing her front wing to come off, but Callie still manages to finish in the top five. In the Singapore Grand Prix, to Aiden's upsets, he is given advice by Devon, which leaves him to determine. In the race, he finishes in the top five, securing more points to the team.

Callie confronts her father in the São Paulo Grand Prix, where the latter reveals he funded Konnersport solely for business reasons. During the end of the safety car lap, Callie finishes in the top five. During the team's briefing in Abu Dhabi, Casper snaps at Davidoff and tells him to leave the team meeting, while Aiden apologises to Callie. During the race, Aiden suffers a mechanical failure and is forced to retire. Devon, seeing the team in danger, gives a fake order to Callie claiming not to push the car too hard, prompting her to drive faster and finish in the top four, achieving the goal that was required to keep Butler Global with them and thus allowing the team to stay in Formula One.

In the aftermath of the race, Butler Global's funding is secured. As Konnersport is set for their next season, Aiden tells the media that he will stay if Casper retains his team principal position, with Butler Global set to renew their sponsorship with the team, while Callie says she is looking forward to her next season.

== Development and release ==
F1 23 was teased in March 2023 by its developers as a "fresh start" for the series. Codemasters, who worked on the series since F1 2009, and EA Sports returned to work on the game. A new trailer showcasing the "Konnersport Butler Global Racing Team" was released on 28 April, with the official trailer launched on 3 May. Prior to the reveal, a closed beta was made available.

The game features two covers, with Max Verstappen on both the original and revised versions of the Champions' Edition cover, with the latter being shown without his helmet with a different winning pose, and Charles Leclerc, Lewis Hamilton, and Lando Norris on the standard edition cover. The game was released on Microsoft Windows, PlayStation 4, PlayStation 5, Xbox One, Xbox Series X/S, and Linux on 16 June, with the Champions Edition of the game available three days earlier on 13 June.

Pre-ordering the Champions' Edition of F1 24 grants access to the 2024 liveries of McLaren, Alpine, Haas, and Williams, all of which were released through a post-launch update.

== Reception ==
Reception

Aggregate score
Aggregator	Score
Metacritic	(PC) 81/100 (PS5) 82/100 (XSXS) 84/100

Review scores
Publication	Score
Famitsu	35/40
Hardcore Gamer	4/5
IGN	8/10
PC Gamer (US)	87/100
Push Square	8/10 stars
Shacknews	7/10
The Guardian	4/5 stars
VideoGamer.com	8/10

F1 23 received "generally favorable" reviews, according to review aggregator website Metacritic. The game was praised for its revised handling model, the AI, and the inclusion of red flags. Many critics considered F1 23 to be an improvement over its predecessor F1 22. Braking Point 2 was also praised for its CGI graphics, the characters, voice performances, plot, and the new team, Konnersport.
