= Walter Tyler =

Walter Tyler may refer to:

- Wat Tyler, 14th century British rebellion leader
- Walter H. Tyler (1909–1990), American film art director
