= Boku Mo Wakaran =

Studio album by Bogdan Raczynski
- Released: 1999
- Genre: Drill 'n' bass
- Length: 71:06
- Label: Rephlex Records
- Producer: Richard D. James

Bogdan Raczynski chronology
Boku Mo Wakaran (1999)	Samurai Math Beats (1999)

Boku Mo Wakaran (in Japanese: ボクも分からん, meaning "I don't understand either" in the Kansai-ben dialect) is Bogdan Raczynski's first album. It was released March 29, 1999, on Rephlex Records. Raczynski mailed a demo of this album to Rephlex Records' head Richard D. James, which resulted in him getting his first record deal. On the CD, Track 24 contains two songs.

== Track listing ==
No.	Title	LP track	Length
1.	Untitled	A1	0:05
2.	Untitled	A2	4:13
3.	Untitled	A3	2:24
4.	Untitled	A4	2:45
5.	Untitled	A5	2:37
6.	Untitled	B1	3:35
7.	Untitled	B2	4:03
8.	Untitled	B3	0:45
9.	Untitled	B4	3:27
10.	Untitled	C1	1:02
11.	Untitled	C2	2:09
12.	Untitled	C3	0:57
13.	Untitled	C4	2:58
14.	Untitled	C5	3:18
15.	Untitled	C6	1:12
16.	Untitled	D1	3:08
17.	Untitled	D2	0:31
18.	Untitled	D3	4:57
19.	Untitled	D4	1:55
20.	Untitled	E1	4:56
21.	Untitled	E2	1:05
22.	Untitled	E3	1:23
23.	Untitled	E4	3:39
24.	Untitled	F1	2:18
25.	Untitled	F1	1:59
26.	Untitled	F2	4:38
27.	Untitled	F3	5:27
