= Powerstar Golf =

2013 video game

- Developer: Zoë Mode
- Publisher: Microsoft Studios
- Composer: Richard Jacques
- Platform: Xbox One
- Release: November 22, 2013
- Genre: Sports
- Modes: Single-player, multiplayer

Powerstar Golf is a golf video game developed by Zoë Mode and published by Microsoft Studios for the Xbox One game console. It was released on November 22, 2013.

== Gameplay ==
Powerstar Golf plays similar to other video game golf games although the game does offer a few unique features: Every character in the game has a unique special move that enables him or her to perform better than they normally would. The game also features a caddy system, and caddies also have unique move sets that players can use to their advantage. The game also uses an RPG-like experience points system where players can earn points to level up their characters by performing small challenges on the course. The game also has an asynchronous multiplayer mode that allows players to play against ghost versions of players on the leaderboard and players can earn additional XP if their "ghost" beats another player who challenges them.

== Reception ==
Reception

Aggregate score
Aggregator	Score
Metacritic	65/100

Review scores
Publication	Score
Destructoid	7/10
Eurogamer	6/10
Game Informer	8/10
GameRevolution	3.5/5
GameSpot	7/10
GamesRadar+	4/5
IGN	7/10
Official Xbox Magazine (UK)	7/10
Official Xbox Magazine (US)	5.5/10
Polygon	7/10

The game was met with mixed reception, garnering a Metacritic rating of 65 out of a possible 100.
