= MyLoveILove =

Studio album by Bogdan Raczynski
- Released: 2001
- Genre: IDM
- Length: 42:03
- Label: Rephlex Records

Bogdan Raczynski chronology
Muzyka Dla Imigrantów (2001)	MyLoveILove (2001)	96 Drum 'n' Bass Classixxx (2002)

Professional ratings
Review scores
Source	Rating
AllMusic	2.5/5 stars
Pitchfork	8.1/10

MyLoveILove (stylised as myloveilove) is a studio album by Bogdan Raczynski. It was released on Rephlex Records in 2001. All the tracks are named as "MyLoveILove".

== Track listing ==
No.	Title	Length
1.	"MyLoveILove"	2:01
2.	"MyLoveILove"	3:01
3.	"MyLoveILove"	1:49
4.	"MyLoveILove"	2:48
5.	"MyLoveILove"	1:03
6.	"MyLoveILove"	6:35
7.	"MyLoveILove"	0:32
8.	"MyLoveILove"	1:51
9.	"MyLoveILove"	2:31
10.	"MyLoveILove"	0:51
11.	"MyLoveILove"	2:23
12.	"MyLoveILove"	1:36
13.	"MyLoveILove"	2:18
14.	"MyLoveILove"	3:03
15.	"MyLoveILove"	2:12
16.	"MyLoveILove"	3:23
17.	"MyLoveILove"	4:06
Total length:		42:03
