= Warhammer 40,000: Fire Warrior =

2003 video game

- Developer: Kuju Entertainment
- Publishers: THQ Chilled Mouse (GOG.com) SNEG (Steam)
- Designers: David Millard; Steven Masters
- Programmers: Tony Francis; Andy Younger; Benjamin Deane
- Artists: Adonis Stevenson; Etienne Jabbour; Jamie Field
- Composer: Ian Livingstone
- Series: Warhammer 40,000
- Platforms: PlayStation 2, Microsoft Windows
- Release: GER: September 24, 2003; EU: September 26, 2003; US: November 17, 2003
- Genre: First-person shooter
- Modes: Single player, multiplayer

Warhammer 40,000: Fire Warrior is a Warhammer 40,000 video game for the PlayStation 2 and Microsoft Windows. It was developed by Kuju Entertainment and released in September 2003.

The game is a first-person shooter, where the player takes the role of a Tau Fire Warrior named Shas'la Kais, seeking to rescue his leader and defend his race from the aggressive Imperium of Man and forces of Chaos.

There is also a multiplayer mode consisting of Deathmatch, Team Deathmatch, and Capture the Flag. Eight multiplayer maps are included with the game, Deathmatch having its own, and Team Deathmatch and Capture the Flag having their own.

It was released digitally by Chilled Mouse on GOG.com on July 25, 2019, and on Steam in 2026.

== Plot ==
The story takes place over a period of 24 hours. The game begins with Kais' first mission, an attempt to rescue the Ethereal Ko'vash from Governor Severus. He infiltrates Severus' prison-fortress, and escapes with Ko'vash intact. As the Orca dropship begins docking with the Tau Emissary class cruiser, it is attacked by an Imperial Battleship, and boarding pods are launched. Kais then fights a desperate battle against a force of Storm Troopers as they try to disable the cruiser's engines, and assassinate the Captain. After Kais fails to rescue the Captain, he and several teams of Fire-Warriors are launched, by boarding pod at the Imperial ship. There, he disables the ship's guns and nearly captures the ship's commander, Admiral Constantine. Kais is clubbed on the head by Captain Ardias, however, and is captured. Ardias brokers a truce between the Imperium and the Tau, and it is revealed that Governor Severus has been seduced by the Powers of Chaos, teleporting a contingent of Word Bearers Chaos Marines onto the ship. They capture the ship's remaining guns, in an attempt to restart the Imperium-Tau war, but are stopped by Kais' destruction of the guns. Ardias then sets the ship to self-destruct, and Kais escapes via a Dreadnought drop-pod. Landing in the midst of a ruined Imperial city, Kais fights his way to fellow Tau Fire-Warriors, and learns from Ardias that Severus plans to use an Imperial Titan held in the City. Kais destroys the Titan, enters Severus' fortress, and kills Severus and his daemonic master. The game ends with Ardias ordering that the planet should be destroyed to prevent the taint of Chaos from spreading. Many adversaries from the Warhammer 40,000 universe are encountered by the protagonist Kais, such as Chaos Dreadnoughts, Word Bearers Chaos Space Marines, Armageddon Steel Legion Imperial Guard, Daemon princes, Obliterators, and an Imperial Valkyrie.

== Novel ==
In October 2003, Black Library Publishing released a novelization of the game under the same title (Spurrier, 2003). The book explores the plot of the game in much greater detail, as well as a close look at Tau culture.

== Reception ==
Reception

Aggregate score
Aggregator	Score
Metacritic	(PC) 47/100 (PS2) 64/100

Review scores
Publication	Score
Eurogamer	(PS2) 5/10
GameSpot	(PC) 4.3/10 (PS2) 5.7/10
GameSpy	(PC) 2/5
GameZone	(PS2) 7.4/10
IGN	(PS2) 8.1/10

Fire Warrior received "generally unfavorable" reviews for Microsoft Windows and "mixed or average" reviews for PlayStation 2, according to review aggregator Metacritic, and received an average score of 6.0 from sites such as IGN and GameSpot. The Windows version was seen as a disappointment and was viewed as mediocre. However, the PlayStation 2 version garnered more positive reception, with it receiving 8.1/10 from IGN and B− from the Play Magazine, along with other moderately positive reviews. It was better received by critics and fans all around, earning it a 71% on GameRankings.
