= Muzyka Dla Imigrantów =

EP by Bogdan Raczynski
- Released: 2001
- Genre: Contemporary classical, IDM
- Length: 13:40
- Label: Rephlex Records

Bogdan Raczynski chronology
Thinking of You (2000)	Muzyka Dla Imigrantów (2001)	MyLoveILove (2001)

Muzyka Dla Imigrantów is an EP by Bogdan Raczynski. It was released on Rephlex Records in 2001. The CD was limited edition and only available originally through www.bogdanraczynski.com. Three of the tracks are also available on his 2001 album, My Love I Love. The title means "Music for Immigrants" in Polish, and most of the text on the album cover is in Polish. NME named it their "Single of the Week".

== Track listing ==
Translations of the titles are listed after, in parentheses.

No.	Title	Length
1.	"Długa Podróż W Chmurach" (Long Journey in Clouds)	4:16
2.	"I Co Dalej" (What's Next)	1:16
3.	"Żegnaj Ziemio Ojczysta" (Goodbye Fatherland)	2:49
4.	"Żegnajcie Ołowiane Żołnierzyki" (Goodbye Leaden Soldiers)	1:49
5.	"Zagubiona Dusza W Tłumie" (Soul Lost in Crowd)	3:04
6.	"Pierwsze Kroki" (First Steps)	0:57

== Credits ==
- Głos, Akordeon, Trąbka, Harfa, Fujarka - Bogdan W. Raczynski (voice, accordion, trumpet, harp, pipe - Bogdan W. Raczynski)
- Napisy: Mama I Tata (inscriptions by mom and dad)
- Dla Mamy I Taty (dedicated to mom and dad)
