= 96 Drum 'n' Bass Classixxx =

Studio album by Bogdan Raczynski
- Released: 2002
- Genre: Drill 'n' bass, IDM
- Length: 49:49
- Label: Rephlex Records

Bogdan Raczynski chronology
MyLoveILove (2001)	96 Drum 'n' Bass Classixxx (2002)	I Will Eat Your Children Too! (2003)

Professional ratings
Review scores
Source	Rating
NME	favorable
Pitchfork	8.7/10

96 Drum 'n' Bass Classixxx is a studio album by Bogdan Raczynski. It was released on Rephlex Records in 2002. Raczynski has created a new artist name for each track, to give the impression that it is a compilation album.

== Track listing ==
No.	Title	Artist name	Length
1.	"Reach for Your Lives"	MC Slammah & Digital Hooliganz	3:12
2.	"Battle Zone 1996"	Suburban Fox	3:33
3.	"Trip to the Boom"	Abdullah K	3:44
4.	"'96 'Ardkore Canin'"	Re-Start	5:16
5.	"On the Case"	DJ Whisky	3:46
6.	"Pouch Fulla Seed (Hard on You Mix)"	Kingsland Kru	2:03
7.	"Cyclops"	King Herod	3:20
8.	"Solid Hold on Me Solid Gold"	Ronny Rinkles	1:18
9.	"D&D Diabolical"	4-Cillinda	2:53
10.	"Governor's Banquet"	The Optomotorist	1:57
11.	"Put Em Up Sharif"	Senator Steele	1:26
12.	"SL45H! 4TT4CK! 3NT3R K3Y!"	Agent 30	4:14
