= Crush (video game) =

2007 video game

- Developer: Zoë Mode
- Publisher: Sega
- Platforms: PlayStation Portable, Nintendo 3DS
- Release: PSP: EU: 25 May 2007; NA: 29 May 2007; AU: 31 May 2007; Nintendo 3DS: EU: 13 January 2012; AU: 9 February 2012; NA: 6 March 2012
- Genre: Puzzle-platform
- Mode: Single-player

Crush is a 2007 puzzle-platform video game developed by Zoë Mode and published by Sega for the PlayStation Portable. Its protagonist is Danny, a young man suffering from insomnia, who uses an experimental device to explore his mind and discover the cause of his sleeplessness. Each level of the game, representing events from Danny's life and inspired by artists such as Tim Burton and M.C. Escher, requires the player to control Danny as he collects his "lost marbles" and other thoughts.

Crush's primary gameplay feature involves manipulating each game level between 3D and 2D views, allowing the player to reach platforms and locations inaccessible from within a different view. This element was noted by critics to be similar to one in Super Paper Mario, also released in 2007, though the Zoë Mode team had envisioned the concept five years prior. Crush received positive reviews upon release, with critics praising its incorporation of this dimension-shifting component alongside other aspects of the game presentation. Though Crush won several gaming awards, including PSP game of the month, it failed to meet the developer's sales expectations. A port of the game for the Nintendo 3DS called CRUSH3D was announced in January 2011 and was made available in January 2012 in Europe; in February 2012 in Australia; and in March 2012 in North America.

== Plot ==
While Crush and its Nintendo 3DS port CRUSH3D retain the same gameplay mechanics and premise, the two versions feature different plots.

=== PSP version ===
The protagonist of the game, a young man named Danny, suffers from chronic insomnia caused by worry, stress, and repressed memories. He is admitted to a mental institution for it, where he consults a mad scientist, Dr. Reubens, who treats Danny with his Cognitive Regression Utilizing pSychiatric Heuristics (C.R.U.S.H.) device, which has a sentient female persona. The device's helmet places Danny under hypnosis, during which he can regain control of his sanity by collecting his lost marbles, and facing his primal fears in the form of monsters (i.e. cockroaches, blockwalkers, slugs). Danny starts recounting key moments in his life that may have contributed to his insomnia: Moving into his first apartment and his suffering job as a chef in the city, his love life some few years ago at the beach with a girl named Tina (which unfortunately ended in him being jilted), and the time he went to a local funfair alone as a young boy, where he ended up assaulted by a group of thugs. When Danny returns to the lab a fourth time after none of these prove to be the case, Dr. Reubens snaps at Danny for wearing out his machine further, and regresses Danny all the way to his childhood, when he was only six years old, against Danny's own will. In the end, Danny reveals that he was left home alone during his parents' date night, with disturbing shadows of the night leaving Danny traumatized. Danny discovers that his childhood fears at that time, principally his nyctophobia, are the real cause of his insomnia. Reubens is disgusted that his treatment was a complete waste and that Danny ruined his machine due to such a petty issue, but tells him he's cured. Right when Reubens begins to snap Danny out of hypnosis, C.R.U.S.H. seems to attack Danny's mind, with Reubens panicking and Danny's life on the line while the screen fades to black.

=== 3DS version ===
Doctor 'Doc' Doccerson (instead of Reubens in the PSP version), is infuriated that all of his inventions failed, but today he 'shall surpass them all' with his latest invention, C.R.U.S.H. He uses a tape recorder for his scientific narrative on the experiment. With the help of his best friend and protégé, Danny (who recurrently corrects Doc throughout the game), he enters his mind as his subject to C.R.U.S.H., but after a few tests, Danny is trapped inside C.R.U.S.H., where he can collect his lost marbles (which will unlock new dressing gowns/robe designs) and facing his fears in the form of monsters (i.e. cockroaches, slugs). At one point, Doc tells Danny that C.R.U.S.H. will not let Danny out due to "unresolved feelings." The two question that reasoning as they progress. Towards the end, C.R.U.S.H. interrupts contact between Danny and Doc, overly infatuated with Danny. Danny slowly admits to C.R.U.S.H. that she is simply a machine and compares it to "flirting with a parking meter." C.R.U.S.H., infuriated, sends Danny back to his childhood as a result. When Doc comes back into contact with Danny, Danny lashes out at Doc for building a machine "with the heart of a teenage girl" who "LOLd" at him. Doc, calming Danny down, explains how this "subconscious" is not really his, but old data, and suddenly Danny becomes shocked when he realizes he took the place of someone who underwent treatment with C.R.U.S.H. (being the PSP Danny), but "she knows [he's] not the same." C.R.U.S.H. really wanted Danny to clear her head. In the ending, Danny finally escapes and is free out of C.R.U.S.H's mind. He and Doc discuss C.R.U.S.H's future, while Doc says that he'll fix her. In a sudden plot twist, it turns out that they were not in the real world at all, but all the levels throughout the game are outside Doc's lab. C.R.U.S.H. smiles and laughs into the camera, she winks and the screen cuts to black.

== Gameplay ==
A level in Crush shown in the 3D perspective. The multi-colored marbles (bottom right) and a trophy "thought" (left) are visible.

The same level in Crush, with the level "crushed" to 2D. The crushed trophy "thought" symbol (left), a collectible puzzle piece (top right), and a continue point (middle) are also shown.

Crush contains ten levels in each of the four locations, all based on an event in Danny's past. The levels represent Danny's mind: a dark city landscape with many tall buildings and the occasional street lamp, a hotel resting aside a seaside location, a dark and mysterious funfair, and a haunted childhood bedroom. Levels are mostly composed of platforms formed by blocks. The player's goal in each level is to collect marbles, which give the player points based on their color. The exit from the level is opened once a predetermined number of points have been collected. Danny can crawl into narrow areas and jump a small height.

The main gameplay feature of Crush is the ability to transpose the layout of a level between 2D and 3D representations to reach seemingly inaccessible areas and solve the game's puzzles. The player can switch the third-person camera between four directional side views and a top-down view at any time while in 3D. When in these views, the player can have Danny "crush" the level, collapsing all 3D elements into 2D; crushing from side views results in a 2D platformer-like view, while crushing from the top-down view provides a 2D top-down perspective. Crushing can connect and merge platforms on the same visual plane in the 3D view but separated by a large distance, creating pathways across the level in the 2D view. The player can also "uncrush" the level at any time. Certain blocks, when crushed, become either obstacles through which Danny cannot pass, or ledges the player can use to reach other parts of the level. Attempts to crush a level in any manner that would harm Danny are thwarted. However, uncrushing can leave Danny in a helpless state, such as hanging in mid-air.

Enemy monsters inhabit the levels, but the player can crush them by flattening impassable blocks against them. The player may also encounter timers in the form of alarm clocks that will begin to elapse when crushed for the first time and can only be stopped when Danny jumps on them. Danny wakes from his mental explorations if he falls off the level or too high of a surface, is touched by a monster, or fails to stop a timer, but the C.R.U.S.H. device reinserts him at the start of the level or the last checkpoint Danny passed.

Throughout the levels are scattered large spheres and cylinders, which the player can roll when crushed appropriately. These can then be used as platforms or to depress switches. Jigsaw pieces can be collected to reveal concept art and extras in the game's menus. Some of Danny's "thoughts", represented by glowing neon icons on the walls of the level, are only activated when the level is crushed in a manner that does not obscure them. Some thoughts allow Danny to jump higher or stop time. Once the player completes each level, they are graded by the duration of Danny's stay on the level, how many times Danny "woke up", and a bonus for collecting all marbles, the jigsaw piece, and a hidden thought trophy. The thought trophy, once completed by crushing, unlocks a level's special challenge mode for later play which requires time-limited completion of the level with an allotted number of crushes.

== Development ==
In an interview, Zoë Mode executive producer Paul Mottram claimed that the game concept was envisioned in 2002, but work did not actually begin until 2006. The initial concept was built on the crushing mechanism between 2D and 3D, and they only had to create appropriate obstacles to prevent players from simply "crushing" across the level. Mottram noted that during the development of Crush, the gameplay of Super Paper Mario had not yet been revealed, and thus the team was surprised to learn that it shared a similar feature.

Mottram stated that the crushing mechanism had been developed and refined for six months before developing the story and characters; the development team wanted to have "a normal person in an impossible situation". The art and level design were inspired by Tim Burton, Mike Mignola, and M.C. Escher. The plot was originally more morbid than in the final product, with Danny dying and the rest of the game told as flashbacks.

The game levels were developed on a level editor on the PlayStation Portable, but Zoë Mode were not able to refine the editor in time for shipping. Mottram said "It would be great to see user generated content and this is something we have been seriously thinking about for the future" and that downloadable content "would work perfectly with the Crush level structure and I am sure that fans of the game would be eager to see more levels." Mottram has stated they would like to market a sequel based on the highly positive feedback they had received; however, with other Zoë Mode projects such as SingStar and Play taking precedence, he does not know when this could be.

== Reception ==
Reception

Aggregate score
Aggregator	Score	
Aggregator	3DS	PSP
Metacritic	71/100	83/100

Review scores
Publication	Score	
Publication	3DS	PSP
Destructoid	6/10	N/A
Edge	7/10	7/10
Electronic Gaming Monthly	N/A	8.67/10
Eurogamer	7/10	8/10
Famitsu	27/40	N/A
GamePro	N/A	4.25/5
GameRevolution	4/5	B
GameSpot	N/A	8.5/10
GameSpy	N/A	4.5/5
GameTrailers	N/A	8.9/10
GameZone	N/A	9/10
IGN	N/A	(US) 8.9/10 (UK) 8/10
Nintendo Power	7/10	N/A
PlayStation: The Official Magazine	N/A	8.5/10
The A.V. Club	N/A	A−
Digital Spy	3/5	N/A

Crush received "favorable" reviews, while CRUSH3D received "average" reviews, according to the review aggregation website Metacritic. The PSP version was highly praised for its innovative approach to gameplay. Ryan Davis of GameSpot appreciated Crush for owing "very little of its novel concept to games that preceded it". Nick Suttner of 1UP called the game a "cognitively rewarding, expertly designed puzzle experience that truly plays like nothing else". Reviews were mixed on the game's learning curve. IGN's Jeremy Dunham praised the ordering of the puzzle elements, that new gaming elements are introduced at "an ideal pace", and that most puzzles have solutions where the player must "think 'outside the box'". Eurogamer's Dan Whitehead commented that the game introduces these elements too quickly and "doesn't give you much time to put the basics into practice". Some critics found that elements of the game detracted from the game's uniqueness. X-Play's Greg Orlando, while stating that this was "one of the most novel games ever made", noted that it was "simply not very fun", as it lacked many player incentives beyond manipulating the world and collecting objects on each level. Reviewers noted that some puzzles were awkward due to the selection of the PlayStation Portable's controls. Reviewers found the game's story poor, but this was overcome by the gameplay elements; Charles Herold of The New York Times said "the minimal story is as forgettable as its puzzles are ingenious." Gus Mastrapa of The A.V. Club said that the game "satisfies the innate gamer need to express the world in easy-to-manipulate numbers and objects." GamesRadar+ included Crush in their list of the 100 most overlooked games of its generation. Editor Jason Fanelli stated that the ability to switch from 2D to 3D was "one of the most unique (at the time) features we've ever seen."

The Digital Fix's Ryan Poxon gave CRUSH3D a score of seven out of ten and called it a "puzzle game that genuinely surprised me at how brain teasing the game actually is." 411Mania's Adam Larck gave it a score of 6.6 out of 10 and said, "For a puzzle game, Crush 3D is a good choice for 3DS fans. While the mechanic may not be as creative as it was a few years ago, it's still a decent game to check out. If you never saw the PSP version or haven't played games like Fez or Echochrome, I'd recommend checking this out to see what crushing is all about." However, Digital Spy's Liam Martin gave it three stars out of five and stated: "Despite the five-year gap between releases, Crush 3D takes a few steps backwards in terms of visual style and presentation. Other than a rather limited and lacklustre selection of new levels and StreetPass features, it also offers very little in the way of brand new bonus content, making it difficult to recommend to anybody familiar with its PSP counterpart. Despite its shortcomings, however, Crush 3D gets it right where it counts." In Japan, where CRUSH3D was ported for release under the name Nightmare Puzzle: Crush 3D (ナイトメア パズル: クラッシュ 3D, Naitomea Pazuru: Kurasshu Surī Dī)) Famitsu gave it a score of three sevens and one six for a total of 27 out of 40.

IGN awarded Crush PSP Game of the Month for May 2007. GameSpy called Crush the third best PlayStation Portable game and the "PSP Puzzle Game of the Year" for its Game of the Year 2007 awards. Similarly, IGN awarded Crush the "Best PSP Puzzle Game", "Most Innovative PSP Game", and "Best PSP Game No One Played" awards in their Game of the Year 2007 selections. Crush won the 2007 Develop Conference Industry Award for "Best New Handheld IP". According to Paul Mottram, positive reception of the game did not translate into high sales, but the game "will hopefully stick around for a while and continue to shift units". GameTrailers made Crush a nominee for "Best PSP Game" in its Game of the Year Awards 2007.

== See also ==
- Echochrome
- Fez
- Super Paper Mario
