= Pokémon Art Academy =

2014 video game

- North American box art
- Developer: Headstrong Games
- Publisher: Nintendo
- Director: Tancred Dyke-Wells
- Producers: Alys Elwick; Keisuke Terasaki; Hitoshi Yamagami
- Designer: Justin Cheadle
- Programmers: Michael Jacobsen; Greg Booker; Callum Brighting; Ian Crowther; Matthew Downie; Nikolaos Papadopoulos; Django Verbaant
- Artist: Jason Howard
- Composer: Masaru Tajima
- Series: Pokémon; Art Academy
- Platform: Nintendo 3DS
- Release: JP: June 19, 2014; EU: July 4, 2014; AU: July 5, 2014; NA: October 24, 2014
- Genre: Educational
- Mode: Single-player

Pokémon Art Academy (Note: Japanese: ポケモン アートアカデミー) is a 2014 educational drawing game developed by Headstrong Games and published by Nintendo for the Nintendo 3DS. It is a spin-off of the Art Academy series featuring characters from the Pokémon media franchise. The game was made available as both a retail and downloadable release from the Nintendo eShop, and is the first 3DS title with built-in Miiverse support for sharing artwork.

== Gameplay ==
Pokémon Art Academy is an educational art game designed to teach players how to draw various Pokémon characters through 40 advancing lessons. Players progress through three skill levels – Novice, Apprentice, and Graduate – while learning new techniques and art concepts, with additional tools such as pastel and paintbrush being unlocked along the way. The Novice course begins with skills such as drawing head-on portraits, angles, and construction shapes, while later stages introduce shading, hatching, opacity, and freehand sketches. Each drawing can be transferred to a Pokémon Trading Card Game card border upon completion, with the option to add a background image.

The game also includes a Free Paint Mode that allows players to draw whatever they wish, with the option to load templates as reference, as well as Quick Sketch Mode, which requires making a simple drawing with limited tools. Additional templates can be obtained by progressing through lessons, or as downloadable content through special promotions over Nintendo Network. Pokémon Art Academy features Miiverse functionality that allows for drawings to be uploaded to Nintendo's Miiverse Community, as well as take part in art contests. Unlike the main Art Academy series, this title features non-traditional tools such as layers and an undo function. These digital art tools are usually avoided in past titles to encourage an authentic experience with traditional art, albeit on a digital medium. Since Pokémon Art Academy is focused on teaching drawing Pokémon characters, a series geared toward young children (albeit not specifically), this title is lenient with these digital tools.

== Development ==
Pokémon Art Academy was first announced by Nintendo in April 2014. It was released officially in Japan on June 19 the same year. An English releases were followed for Europe, New Zealand and Australia in July. A North American version was released in the fall, in October.

== Reception ==
Reception

Aggregate score
Aggregator	Score
Metacritic	76/100

Review scores
Publication	Score
Famitsu	31/40
Nintendo Life	8/10
Nintendo World Report	8/10
Official Nintendo Magazine	77%

Pokémon Art Academy entered the Japanese sales charts as the number-one selling title of its debut week with 31,080 copies, and by the following August would go on to sell a total of 91,232 copies in the region before falling from the weekly top 20 software rankings. It received a 31 out of 40 total from editors of Japanese Weekly Famitsu magazine based on individual scores of 7, 8, 7, and 9, earning the publication's Silver Award.

The game met with a mostly positive response in Europe, earning a 77% score from aggregate review website GameRankings and a 76 out of 100 average from Metacritic. While Official Nintendo Magazine found the title to be "challenging, fun and educational in the best of ways". The reviewer remarked that the game's lessons advanced too drastically, going from "extremely simplistic" early stages to requiring advanced drawing skills without explanation of proportions or expressions. The magazine also felt that experienced artists may be put off by the lack of tools or layering options, but nonetheless called the game "lovely to play, never punishing you for imperfect work, encouraging and helping you to better your drawing".
