= Samurai Math Beats =

Studio album by Bogdan Raczynski
- Released: 1999
- Genre: Drill 'n' bass
- Length: 59:06
- Label: Rephlex Records

Bogdan Raczynski chronology
Boku Mo Wakaran (1999)	Samurai Math Beats (1999)	Ibiza Anthems Vol. 4 (2000)

Professional ratings
Review scores
Source	Rating
AllMusic	4/5 stars
NME	3.5/5 stars

Samurai Math Beats is a studio album by Bogdan Raczynski. It was released on Rephlex Records in 1999.

In 2014, "Samurai Masu Bitsu" ranked at number 29 on Fact's "100 Greatest IDM Tracks" list.

== Track listing ==
No.	Title	Length
1.	"Samurai Masu Bitsu"	5:31
2.	"Kimi"	3:27
3.	"Ahou Jiko"	4:20
4.	"Iai"	3:16
5.	"I Cry, Bai Bai"	5:12
6.	"Sayonara Tsutara"	4:00
7.	"Nan No Tame Ni Boku To Honyaku Shika"	3:15
8.	"Miso Shiru"	5:33
9.	"Nihon De Homuresu"	4:44
10.	"Are Igai Imi Ga Nai"	3:11
11.	"Kimi Wa Tsumannai, Boku O Iranai"	2:12
12.	"Yari Chuu, Kyouryoku Isuu"	2:49
13.	"Gaijin Sabetsu, Gaikoku Hakuchuumu"	3:11
14.	"Why? Why?"	4:54
15.	"Ahou Bouken"	3:31

== Translations ==
Translations of applicable track names are listed below.

Original track title	Translation
Kimi	You
Ahou Jikou	Idiot mistake
Sayonara Tsutara	Goodbye, Tsutara
Miso Shiru	Miso soup
Nihon De Homuresu	Homeless in Japan
Ahou Bouken	Idiot adventure
