= Alright! (album) =

Studio album by Bogdan Raczynski
- Released: 19 November 2007
- Genre: Drill 'n' bass, IDM
- Length: 42:03
- Label: Rephlex Records

Bogdan Raczynski chronology
Renegade Platinum Mega Dance Attack Party: Don the Plates (2003)	Alright! (2007)	Rave 'Till You Cry (2019)

Professional ratings
Review scores
Source	Rating
AllMusic	3.5/5 stars
PopMatters	7/10 stars
Prefix	7.5/10

Alright! is a studio album by Bogdan Raczynski. It was released on Rephlex Records in 2007. It would be his final release for 12 years until "Rave 'Till You Cry."

== Track listing ==
No.	Title	Length
1.	"Alright! (Part One)"	4:59
2.	"Alright! (Part Two)"	4:51
3.	"Alright! (Part Three)"	4:31
4.	"Alright! (Part Four)"	4:32
5.	"Alright! (Part Five)"	4:05
6.	"Alright! (Part Six)"	5:32
7.	"Alright! (Part Seven)"	5:58
8.	"Alright! (Part Eight)"	7:38
