= M.A.C.H. (video game) =

2007 video game

M.A.C.H. Modified Air Combat Heroes
- Developer: Kuju Surrey
- Publisher: Vivendi Games (Note: Released under the Sierra Entertainment brand name in all regions except Japan)
- Designer: Alex Cullum
- Platform: PlayStation Portable
- Release: JP: January 18, 2007; NA: February 20, 2007; EU: March 9, 2007
- Genres: Action, racing
- Modes: Single-player, multiplayer

M.A.C.H. Modified Air Combat Heroes is an action - racing video game, for the PlayStation Portable, developed by Kuju Ltd and published in 2007 by Vivendi Games. Set in 2049 where unmanned aircraft have rendered piloted planes obsolete, decommissioned jet planes compete in underground tournaments.

== Gameplay ==
M.A.C.H. Modified Air Combat Heroes is a flight combat game with two main modes: a racing mode where players can race their planes vs AI opponents, and a free for all arena where seven AI opponents fight each other and the player for the most kills. The arena and race maps are filled with weapon powerups that the player and the AI can use. The player can fly close to the ground to activate machpower which gives the plane a speed boost. In career mode, by defeating rivals, players can progress by unlocking new planes and parts to upgrade them with. Modes include Arcade Mode (Quick Action), Career Mode (Tournaments), Challenge Mode (five challenges per tier) and Dogfight Mode. The game has been described as Top Gun meets Mario Kart.

== Reception ==
Reception

Review scores
Publication	Score
1Up.com	C
4Players	76%
GamePro	3.5/5
GameSpot	7.2/10
GamesRadar+	3.5/5
IGN	5.9/10
Jeuxvideo.com	9/20
PALGN	6/10
Pocket Gamer	3.5/5

The game received generally mixed reviews, according to review aggregator Metacritic.
