= The City of the Dead =

City of the Dead or The City of the Dead may refer to:

== Places ==
- City of the Dead (Cairo), a cemetery and neighbourhood in Cairo, Egypt
- Dargavs necropolis, an Alanian burial site in North Ossetia-Alania, Russia, referred to as "City of the dead"
- Dead Cities, a group of abandoned settlements in Northwest Syria
- El Tajín, a pre-Columbian archeological site in Mexico whose original name is claimed to have been Mictlan or "place of the dead"
- Myra, a collection of Lycian rock-cut tombs in Antalya Province, Turkey
- Southern Necropolis, a cemetery in Glasgow, Scotland

== Films ==
- The City of the Dead (film), a 1960 British horror film which had the title Horror Hotel for the US release
- City of the Living Dead, a 1980 horror film by Lucio Fulci
- City of the Walking Dead, the US title for Nightmare City
- Gangs of the Dead, a 2006 American horror film retitled City of the Dead for its German and Italian premieres
- Chhota Bheem & Krishna: Patliputra- City of the Dead, an Indian animated film in the Chhota Bheem series

== Novels ==
- City of the Dead (novel), a 2005 novel by Brian Keene
- The City of the Dead (novel), a 2001 Doctor Who novel
- Galaxy of Fear: City of the Dead, a Star Wars novel by John Whitman
- Resident Evil: City of the Dead, a 1999 novelisation of the video game Resident Evil 2

== Others ==
- "City of the Dead", a song by The Clash, the B-side to the "Complete Control" single
- "City of the Dead" (song), a song by the Finnish rock band The Rasmus
- City of the Dead (video game), a canceled video game based on George A. Romero's Dead series

== See also ==
- Necropolis, a term for a cemetery, derived from the Greek for "city of the dead"
