= Lotus Challenge =

2001 video game

- Developer: Kuju Entertainment
- Publishers: Virgin Interactive (PS2); Xicat Interactive (Xbox); Sold-Out Software (Win); Ignition Entertainment (GC)
- Platforms: PlayStation 2, GameCube, Windows, Xbox
- Release: PlayStation 2: EU: 2 November 2001; Windows: EU: 23 February 2003; Xbox: EU: 28 March 2003; NA: 30 April 2003; GameCube: NA: 4 August 2004; Mobile; 20 September 2004
- Genre: Racing
- Modes: Single-player, multiplayer

Lotus Challenge is a racing game developed by Kuju Entertainment and published in 2001 for PlayStation 2 by Virgin Interactive. Versions followed for Windows, GameCube, and Xbox from different publishers.

== Gameplay ==
Lotus Extreme Challenge is a racing game featuring a variety of Lotus cars from different eras. The game includes multiple gameplay modes:

- Story Mode: Players start with a basic car and compete in races to earn money, build a racing team, and participate in championships. Over time, they unlock better cars and gain movie contracts for stunt driving challenges.
- Championship Mode: Racers compete across 17 tracks, unlocking and racing different Lotus models, with older cars competing against their era counterparts.
- Movie Stunt Driving Mode: Players perform stunt challenges for film productions, earning money and cinematic replays of their performances.
- Driving Challenges: Unique scenarios such as rushing passengers to a hospital through heavy traffic or evading speeding cameras on city streets.
- Damage System: Cars visually degrade and handle differently based on damage, adding realism to races.

The game promises realistic driving physics, authentic Lotus car models, and multiplayer split-screen racing.

== Development ==
Virgin Interactive first announced the game for the PlayStation 2 and Microsoft Windows in August 2000 for an early-2001 release. The game was renamed Lotus Extreme Challenge in November 2000 with a North American release planned to be published by Interplay Entertainment, although this never came to circulation. The game would eventually see its release under its former name. The PlayStation 2 version was later ported to Japan and published by MTO on 26 December 2002.

In March 2002, Virgin Interactive announced they would release the game on the Xbox under the name of Lotus Arcade before reverting to its former name, with the announcement that the Xbox version would feature major improvements over the PS2 version. The game was due for a release in Europe by Virgin in September but this never happened. In November 2002, Xicat Interactive announced they would release the game in North America instead as an Xbox exclusive, with a GameCube port also announced. In December 2002, Xicat secured a licensing deal with Motor Trend to rename the title as Motor Trend Presents Lotus Challenge, with the Xbox version originally scheduled for release in late January 2003, before it was somewhat delayed to the end of April. The GameCube version was due for a release in August but was pulled for unknown reasons.

In May 2004, Ignition Entertainment's website listed a title named Lotus Extreme for the GameCube. However, the game was renamed again back to its original title a few weeks later when it was officially announced by Ignition, and was released shortly after.

== Reception ==
Reception

Aggregate score
Aggregator	Score		
Aggregator	GameCube	PS2	Xbox
Metacritic	N/A	N/A	61/100

Review scores
Publication	Score		
Publication	GameCube	PS2	Xbox
4Players	N/A	71%	69%
Electronic Gaming Monthly	N/A	N/A	4/10 (Note: Three critics of Electronic Gaming Monthly gave the Xbox version each a score of 4/10, 3.5/10, and 4.5/10.)
Gamekult	N/A	5/10	N/A
GameSpy	N/A	N/A	3/5
GameZone	N/A	N/A	7.3/10
Jeuxvideo.com	N/A	8/20	8/20
Nintendo Power	1.5/5	N/A	N/A
Official Xbox Magazine (US)	N/A	N/A	7.2/10
TeamXbox	N/A	N/A	5.8/10
X-Play	N/A	N/A	3/5

The Xbox version received "mixed" reviews according to the review aggregation website Metacritic. GameSpy, GameZone, and Extended Play gave it above-average to mixed reviews while it was still in development.

The game sold more than 130,000 units for the PlayStation 2.
