= Ibiza Anthems Vol. 4 =

Ibiza Anthems volume 4

EP by Bogdan Raczynski
- Released: March 27, 2000
- Genre: Drill 'n' bass, IDM
- Length: 20:57
- Label: Rephlex Records

Bogdan Raczynski chronology
Samurai Math Beats (1999)	Ibiza Anthems volume 4 (2000)	Thinking of You (2000)

Professional ratings
Review scores
Source	Rating
AllMusic	3/5 stars

Ibiza Anthems volume 4 is an EP by Bogdan Raczynski. It was released on Rephlex Records in March 2000.

== Track listing ==
No.	Title	Length
1.	"Imperialist Takeover"	3:38
2.	"Bombs Over Ibiza"	7:27
3.	"Death to the Natives"	2:51
4.	"Trance and Burn"	3:57
5.	"Ibiza TM"	3:04
