= Classified: France '44 =

2024 video game

- Developer: Absolutely Games
- Publisher: Team17
- Engine: Unity Engine
- Platforms: PlayStation 5; Windows; Xbox Series X/S
- Release: 5 March 2024
- Genre: Turn-based tactics
- Mode: Single-player

Classified: France '44 is a 2024 turn-based tactics video game developed by Absolutely games and published by Team17. It was released on 5 March 2024 for PlayStation 5, Windows and Xbox Series X/S.

== Gameplay ==
Classified: France '44 is a turn-based tactics game set in France during World War II, 65 days before the Battle of Normandy. There are different types of missions the player must complete, such as ambush and dedicated stealth, which have primary and secondary objectives. On the Windows version, the game also includes a mission editor to give players the ability to craft and share missions.

== Development and release ==
On 28 May 2023, Team17 announced a new game under the placeholder name Redacted. Absolutely Games and Team17 announced the game would be called Classified: France '44 on 31 May 2023, and was scheduled to release on PlayStation 5, Windows and Xbox Series X/S that year.

Team17 announced the game would be delayed into early 2024 and revealed a demo would be playable from 9 October until 16 October during Steam Next Fest. Classified: France '44 was subsequently launched on 5 March 2024 for all platforms.

== Reception ==
Reception

Aggregate score
Aggregator	Score
Metacritic	(PC) 75/100 (PS5) 73/100

Review scores
Publication	Score
GameStar	78/100
PC Gamer (UK)	75/100
PlayStation Universe	7/10

Classified: France '44 received "generally favourable" reviews from critics on PC whilst it received "mixed or average" reviews from critics on PlayStation 5, according to review aggregator site Metacritic.

GameStar rated the game 78/100 and praised the "solid campaign framework" and described it as "XCOM light in World War 2". PC Gamer rated it 75/100 and wrote that it was "a suspenseful yet forgiving turn-based tactics game that lets you play a part in shaping history". PlayStation Universe rated the game 7/10 and praised the new and forward-thinking features that "address the qualms of the genre", but was critical of the story and personalities.
