= F1 2014 (video game) =

2014 video game

- Developer: Codemasters Birmingham
- Publisher: Codemasters
- Composer: Ian Livingstone
- Series: F1
- Engine: EGO Engine 3.0
- Platforms: Microsoft Windows, Xbox 360, PlayStation 3
- Release: JP: 2 October 2014; AU: 16 October 2014; UK: 17 October 2014; NA: 21 October 2014
- Genre: Racing
- Modes: Single-player, multiplayer

F1 2014 is a racing video game based on the 2014 Formula One season developed and published by Codemasters. Despite releasing during the lifespan of eighth-generation consoles PlayStation 4 and Xbox One, the game was released on seventh-generation consoles PlayStation 3 and Xbox 360 instead, in addition to a release on Microsoft Windows. F1 2014 is the last F1 game to be released in September/October, releasing during the latter month, and the last to be released on the aforementioned PlayStation 3 and Xbox 360. The game received mixed reviews from critics, who criticised the lack of innovation and removal of the classic content from the previous title. The online servers for the game were shut down on 21 March 2024.

== Features ==
The game features the initial driver line-ups from the 2014 season. Substitute drivers Will Stevens and André Lotterer were not included in the game, as they both only raced once during that season. Furthermore, all races feature full grids of 22 drivers - in the real-life season, the Marussia team were absent for the final three races of the season due to financial difficulties whilst Caterham also missed two races towards the end of the season due to financial difficulties before returning for the final round in Abu Dhabi. The game features the new turbo-hybrid cars introduced in that season, as well as the team and driver line-ups. All of the Formula One tracks are featured, including new additions like the Red Bull Ring, Hockenheimring, the brand-new Sochi Autodrom, and Bahrain in night conditions. Several teams used the same steering wheel model across multiple cars such as Mercedes, Sauber, and Toro Rosso instead of creating unique designs for each car.

The game allows players to choose any team to drive for at the start of Career Mode, rather than forcing the player to start at a team lower down the grid, as in previous titles. Also unlike previous titles, the Career Mode allows players to choose from three different season lengths: seven races, 12 races or the full 19 races. The game also features a new driver evaluation test, and the Scenario Mode has been improved. The game does not feature Classic Content, a feature from the game's predecessor which allowed users to drive historic Formula One cars around historic tracks.

This was the last game in the series to use red flag mechanics, until it was reintroduced in F1 23.

== Reception ==
Reception

Aggregate scores
Aggregator	Score
GameRankings	PC: 60.33% PS3: 60.43% X360: 66.18%
Metacritic	PC: 61/100; PS3: 62/100; X360: 64/100

Review scores
Publication	Score
Eurogamer	5/10
GameRevolution	4.5/5
GamesMaster	69/100
GamesRadar+	3.5/5
GameStar	79/100
PlayStation Official Magazine – Australia	50%
PlayStation Official Magazine – UK	5/10
PC Gamer (US)	67/100
Hardcore Gamer	4/5

F1 2014 received "mixed or average" reviews, according to video game review aggregator Metacritic. Reviewers praised the new feel of the 2014 turbo-hybrid cars, the graphics, the racing action and some new features that made the game more accessible, but criticism of the lack of new major features and the removal of the classic content from the previous game resulted in mixed reviews.

Game Revolution gave the game a positive review with a rating of 4.5 out of 5, stating that its "authentic, fun racing balances accessibility and simulation well", and that "a focus shift from history and F1 melodrama to races alone is a welcome change". They also praised the graphics, calling them "superb" for PS3/Xbox 360, with "impressive" weather effects.

The game received a mixed review from Eurogamer, rating it 5 out of 10, citing lack of new features and an uninspiring career mode, and considered a step back for the series.

Hardcore Gamer gave the game a 4 out of 5. Although they were critical that the classic F1 races were not recreated for this iteration, they called career mode a far more diverse, intense, and enjoyable experience.

PC Gamer rated the game 67 out of 100, concluding that "with its fundamentals unchanged and last years foray into classic cars removed, F1 2014 provides very little beyond a perfunctory car and track update". They criticized the lack of new major features, sarcastically commenting that "on the back of F1 2014's box under 'new features', there may as well be a picture of a man shrugging apologetically".

In the years after its release, a dedicated modding community appeared, with modders adding content from numerous Formula One seasons, including the current 2025 season, to the Windows version of the game.
