= City of the Dead (video game) =

- The never-released official cover
- Developer: Kuju Entertainment
- Publisher: Hip Interactive
- Series: Living Dead
- Platforms: PC, PlayStation 2, Xbox
- Release: Canceled
- Genre: First-person shooter
- Mode: Single-player

City of the Dead (also known as George A. Romero's City of the Dead and The Living Dead: City of the Dead) is a canceled first-person shooter video game, based on George A. Romero's Living Dead series of zombie films. The game was intended for release on the PlayStation 2, Xbox and PC platforms. Originally announced in December 2004, it was due for release in March 2006. No further details or announcements have been made about the game since its showing at E3 2005. It is presumed cancelled due to declared bankruptcy of publisher Hip Interactive in July 2005.

== Story ==
City of the Dead was set on a fictional island called "Ningún Futuro" ("No Future" in Spanish). A zombie outbreak occurs on the island after a series of secret military tests on cadavers backfires.

Reports had said there would be no reference in the game to Dawn of the Dead (because the 2004 version ends with the survivors winding up in a zombie-ridden island), one of the more popular films in the Dead Series due to copyright issues with the MKR Group who hold the rights to the film.

== Development ==
Hip Interactive announced on December 15, 2004 that they had made an agreement with Living Dead Productions to produce a series of games based on Romero's films, with City of the Dead being the first to be developed and released. The company also expected to develop games based directly on the movies Night of the Living Dead and Dawn of the Dead.

Before the cancellation, it was announced that Tom Savini, make-up artist and regular actor in the Dead Series, would be providing the voice and likeness of a character in the game. The character would have been William "Red" McLean, a supporting character that later becomes playable himself.

A trailer was released to publications, and actual gameplay was shown at E3 2005 (but was not playable by those attending). Those that saw the presentation have commented that City of the Dead contained exceptionally extreme amounts of graphic violence.
