= Kuju (company) =

British video game developer

Kuju Entertainment Ltd.
- Type: Subsidiary
- Industry: Video games
- Predecessor: Simis
- Founded: 1998; 28 years ago
- Parent: Catalis Group (2007–present)
- Subsidiaries: Headstrong Games (2000–2017); Doublesix (2009–2010); Vatra Games (2009–2012); Zoë Mode (2004–2016)
- Website: kuju.com

Kuju Entertainment Ltd. is a British video game developer. It is a successor to Simis, which was formed in 1989 and purchased by Eidos Interactive in 1995. Kuju was formed in 1998 in Shalford, Surrey, England, after a management buyout of Simis from Eidos. Kuju merged with Curve Games in 2016. However, it remains in operation as a name-only division.

Kuju released titles across different devices, ranging from Art Academy on the Nintendo DS, The Lord of the Rings: Aragorn's Quest and Battalion Wars 2 for the Wii, and an Xbox One title, Powerstar Golf.

== History ==
Ian Baverstock and Jonathan Newth opened Simis in 1989 and produced a number of flight simulator programs like MiG-29 Fulcrum. In 1995, the company was purchased by Eidos and operated as an in-house development studio. In 1998, Baverstock and Newth led a management buyout of the studio from Eidos Interactive, forming Kuju Ltd.

The name "Kuju" originates from the initials of the founders’ first names: Ian Baverstock and Jonathan Newth. Jonathan was leafing through a Japanese dictionary when he found the numbers nine and ten – "ku" and "ju" – corresponding to the positions of "I" and "J" in the English alphabet. The combined result was Kuju. Their first game was Tank Racer, a 3D action racer for PC, PlayStation and mobile.

By 2001, Kuju was employing a team of 80 developers, in three separate offices around the UK in London, Surrey and Brighton. Their most notable project at the time was Microsoft Train Simulator. In 2002, Kuju floated on the Alternative Investments Market (AIM) of the London Stock Exchange. Shortly thereafter the company signed its first game with THQ based on the Games Workshop franchise, Warhammer 40,000: Fire Warrior. In the following years between 2002 and 2007, Kuju developed titles including SingStar games and the Battalion Wars franchise. Kuju was one of the companies considered to develop the game engine for BBC's game show FightBox.

In 2007, Kuju Ltd. was acquired by a German media investment firm, Catalis SE. Soon after, Kuju Brighton was rebranded to Zoë Mode, and in 2008, Kuju London rebranded to Headstrong Games. In 2010, Headstrong Games completed development of Art Academy for the Nintendo DS console. In June 2012, Dominic Wheatley, co-founder of Domark, was appointed as CEO; while Gary Bracey, former vice-president of development at Ocean Software, was appointed as commercial director.

== Studios ==
=== Headstrong Games ===
The studio was formed in 2000 as Kuju London. In 2008, it was rebranded as Headstrong Games.

Headstrong Games has developed versions of The House of the Dead: Overkill, The Lord of the Rings: Aragorn's Quest and Top Gun: Hard Lock. Original intellectual properties include Art Academy, which was developed for and owned by Nintendo. They also developed the Battalion Wars series, installments in Nintendo's Wars series.

=== Doublesix ===
The studio was formed from the team that made Geometry Wars: Galaxies. They also made the zombie themed shooter, Burn Zombie Burn!. The company has received awards and nominations since its inception; notably that of the develop "Best New UK Studio 2008" and a nomination for best hand-held game (Geometry Wars: Galaxies) at the 2009 BAFTAs. They also worked on a successor to Burn Zombie Burn!, entitled All Zombies Must Die!. On 1 September 2010, Doublesix left Kuju label and became a separate entity. The studio side of Doublesix was closed in 2012 after handing development of Strike Suit Zero to Born Ready Games.

=== Vatra Games ===
Vatra Games was a Czech video game studio founded in 2009 when Kuju Entertainment was seeking developers to establish a new studio. At the same time, several developers from 2K Czech were retiring. These developers decided to form a new studio, which became Vatra Games. In July 2012, four months after the March release of Silent Hill: Downpour, Kuju Entertainment Limited terminated its contract with Vatra Games. In September 2012, Vatra Games was declared bankrupt.

=== Zoë Mode ===
In 2003, Kuju Entertainment hired the Wide Games team to create the video games studio Kuju Brighton. In 2007, Kuju Brighton was rebranded to Zoë Mode. The studio's first release under its new name was Crush for Sega. In 2009, Zoë Mode released the puzzle game Chime, produced by the non-profit OneBigGame. In 2011, the studio signed the deal to develop Zumba Fitness 2. In June 2008, Zoë Mode signed the deal to develop Rock Revolution.

Zoë Mode have worked on the EyeToy series, Zumba dance franchise and Powerstar Golf. They also developed games for Xbox's Kinect.

=== Previous Kuju Studios ===
- Kuju Surrey
- Kuju Sheffield (latterly rebranded as Chemistry)
- Nik Nak Games
- Kuju America
- Kuju Manila

== Games ==
- Microsoft Train Simulator (2001)
- Lotus Challenge (2001)
- Reign of Fire (2002)
- Fire Blade (2002)
- SingStar (with London Studio) (2002)
- Warhammer 40,000: Fire Warrior (2003)
- EyeToy: Play (2003)
- GT-R 400 (2004)
- Crash Twinsanity 3D (2004)
- Call of Duty: Finest Hour (with Spark Unlimited) (PS2 and Xbox versions only) (2004)
- Battalion Wars (2005)
- Conspiracy: Weapons of Mass Destruction (2005)
- The Regiment (2006)
- Sensible Soccer 2006 (2006)
- Pilot Academy (2006)
- Crush (2007)
- Geometry Wars: Galaxies (with Bizarre Creations) (2007)
- Battalion Wars 2 (2007)
- Nucleus (2007)
- Rail Simulator (2007)
- Dungeons & Dragons Tactics (2007)
- Dancing with the Stars (2007)
- M.A.C.H. Modified Air Combat Heroes (2007)
- Sensible World of Soccer (Xbox Live Arcade version) (2007)
- Rock Revolution (2008–2009)
- You're in the Movies (2008–2009)
- The House of the Dead: Overkill (2009)
- Disney Sing It (2008)
- Art Academy (2009–2010)
- The Lord of the Rings: Aragorn's Quest (2010)
- Chime (2010)
- Disney Sing It: Family Hits (2010)
- Grease: The Game (2010)
- Chime: Super Deluxe (2011)
- Zumba Fitness 2 (2011)
- Rush 'N Attack: Ex-Patriot (2011)
- Silent Hill: Downpour (2012)
- Top Gun: Hard Lock (2012)
- Haunt (2012)
- Crush 3D (2012)
- New Art Academy (2012)
- Zumba Fitness Rush (2012)
- Zumba Fitness Core (2012)
- Rabbids Rumble (2012)
- Zumba Fitness: World Party (2013)
- Zumba Kids (2013)
- Powerstar Golf (2013)
- Pokémon Art Academy (2014)
- Guitar Hero Live (2015)
- Disney Art Academy (2016)
- Marvel: Ultimate Alliance (2016)
- Marvel: Ultimate Alliance 2 (2016)
- Narcos: Rise of the Cartels (2019)

=== Canceled ===
- City of the Dead (2005)
- Knight Wars (2007)
