= Art Academy: Lessons for Everyone! =

2012 video game

- North American box art
- Developer: Headstrong Games
- Publisher: Nintendo
- Director: Tancred Dyke-Wells
- Producers: Kensuke Tanabe; Keisuke Terasaki
- Composers: Masaru Tajima; James Hannigan
- Series: Art Academy
- Platform: Nintendo 3DS
- Release: EU: July 28, 2012; AU: August 23, 2012; JP: September 13, 2012; NA: October 1, 2012
- Genre: Art training game (edutainment video game)
- Mode: Single-player

Art Academy: Lessons for Everyone!, entitled New Art Academy in Europe and Australia and New Artistic Taste Classroom (Note: Japanese: 新 絵心教室, Hepburn: Shin egokoro kyōshitsu) in Japan, is a 2012 video game for the Nintendo 3DS. It is a sequel to Art Academy for the Nintendo DS. This game is the first in the series to include DLC.

== Gameplay ==
Guided by the bearded artist Vince, the player completes tutorials in basic artistic composition. The skills are intended to be transferable to art practice outside the game. Vince instructs in portraiture, landscapes, still life, and architecture. The basic lessons include how to block with color and add detail, how to add light and shade to line drawings, and how to mix paint and create atmosphere. Advanced lessons include expansions on these ideas with shorter exposition from Vince.

Additions to its predecessor include pencil crayons and pastels. The game has a new user interface, a higher resolution, and lets players mix media more easily. The game also allows users to create their own lessons to share with friends.

== Reception ==
Reception

Aggregate score
Aggregator	Score
Metacritic	81/100

Review scores
Publication	Score
IGN	8/10
Nintendo Life	8/10
Nintendo World Report	9/10
Pocket Gamer	4/5

The critical reception has been favorable upon the release, scoring 81/100 on the aggregator site Metacritic, based on reviews of 14 critics.

IGN's Chris Schilling found Art Academy to be better and more complete than its predecessor but still capable of more. He wrote that Colors 3D offered more while costing less—he lamented the absence of a 3D painting feature, in particular. Art Academy, Schilling felt, could serve as an educational preparation for games like Colors. He praised the usefulness of the game's classes and their flourishes of art history, and found that the larger Nintendo 3DS XL screen let the player add more detail.

== Sequels ==
A sequel, Art Academy: Sketchpad, was released in 2013 for the Wii U as an eShop app. Another sequel for Wii U, Art Academy: Home Studio, was released in 2015.
