= Hammer Heads =

2006 video game

- Developer: Nuclide Games
- Publisher: PopCap Games
- Designers: Luc Van den Borre; Camnoidus Spingle; Dominique Biesmans
- Engine: PopCap Games Framework
- Platforms: Windows, browser
- Release: May 23, 2006
- Genre: Action
- Mode: Single-player

Hammer Heads is an action video game similar to Whac-A-Mole. It was developed by Nuclide Games and distributed by PopCap Games.

== Gameplay ==
The objective of the game is to smash the gnomes coming from the holes in the game area. The player controls a hammer with the mouse, and clicking on a gnome reduces its hearts (displayed on its base) by a set amount depending on the power of the hammer. Different types of gnomes appear as the game progresses, with varying characteristics and numbers of hearts. The player's health is represented by a row of hearts at the top of the screen; health is lost for missing with a hammer strike, activating a trap (such as a bomb disguised as a gnome), or letting a gnome escape without destroying it. If all hearts are lost, the game ends.

Destroyed gnomes occasionally drop hearts or coins, which respectively restore the player's health and allow the purchase of various power-up items at the in-game shop when it pops up. Loose items lying on the ground can be hit for bonus points. Coins can be acquired by other means, such as defeating particular gnomes in specified ways or playing a bonus round.

At the end of each level, the player earns bonus points based on their performance (click accuracy, number of gnomes destroyed, etc.).

== Deluxe version ==
The deluxe version of Hammer Heads includes two modes of play, the regular game ("Classic Bash") and an endless variation ("Marathon Bash"). Within Classic Bash, a checkpoint is established after the player completes every fifth level. Once the game ends, the player may choose to continue from any checkpoint reached to that moment, retaining all accumulated items but with the score reset to zero. This variation has a total of 25 levels, the last of which culminates in a fight against the game's boss, King Globus. Defeating him unlocks "Tough Cookie" mode, a more difficult version of Classic Bash. Marathon Bash has no checkpoints and continues for as long as the player can keep from losing all their hearts. In both modes, the player can earn trophies for meeting certain objectives.
