= Burn Zombie Burn =

2009 video game

Burn Zombie Burn!
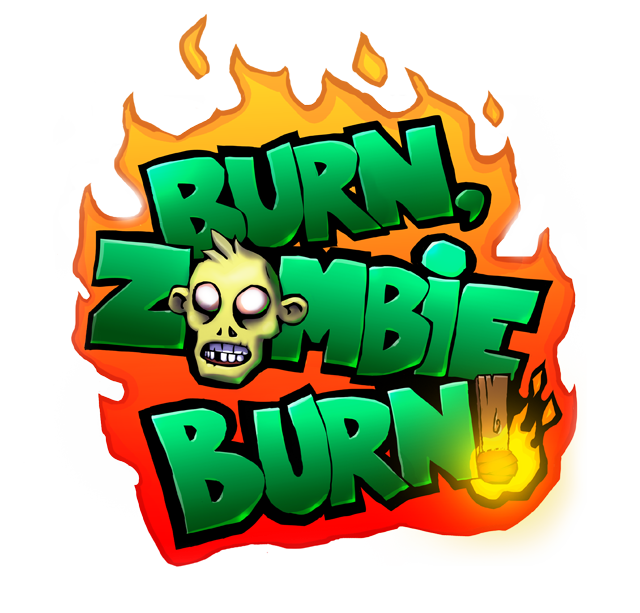
- Developer: Doublesix
- Publisher: Doublesix
- Designer: Jim Mummery
- Engine: PhyreEngine
- Platforms: PlayStation 3 Microsoft Windows; Mac OS X
- Release: NA: March 26, 2009; EU: March 26, 2009
- Genre: Shooter
- Modes: Single-player, multiplayer

Burn, Zombie Burn! is a shooter video game for PlayStation 3 and Microsoft Windows developed by Doublesix. The PC version is published by P2 Games and launched via the Steam platform on August 12, 2010.

== Gameplay ==
In Burn Zombie Burn! the player controls a character called Bruce, against a never ending horde of various zombies. The objective is to kill as many zombies as possible before he dies, whilst reaching certain score thresholds that unlock more of the game. Designed as a top-down arena based shooter, it is split across six levels. The core mechanic, as described in the game's title, is about setting zombies on fire. In order to score high, the player has to set zombies on fire and each zombie on fire adds to their score multiplier. Burning zombies are more dangerous as they run faster and deal more damage to the player if they get too close. They will also give power-ups that increase power, speed and range, whereas they normally drop health and ammo packs.

Each level also has a unique event that is triggered by the “Big Red Button”. Attaining three consecutive weapon combos activates the button. Each event will normally help the player in some way but later in the game they can also harm him.

There are four modes in the game: Freeplay (where the goal is just to survive as long as possible), Defense (the players have to protect Bruce's girlfriend Daisy), Timed (all levels have a time limit) and Challenges (there are varied rules set). However, unlocking levels within each mode has to be done by the player. There is also a tutorial called Zombie Academy, which teaches the ways of setting the zombies on fire.

== PlayStation Home ==
On July 30, 2009, Doublesix released a Burn Zombie Burn themed space in the PlayStation 3's online community-based service, PlayStation Home. The space is called the "Burn Zombie Burn Lobby" in Asia and the "DoubleSix Lobby" in Europe and North America, and features a mini-game called The Maze. The Maze is a zombie infested maze that the users must make it through within two minutes. If they make it through successfully, they are rewarded a T-shirt for their Home avatar. The space also features a shop where users can buy additional Burn Zombie Burn themed T-shirts and outfits. There is also a video screen in the space advertising the game as well as a poster and seating for the users avatars. This space is available in the Asian, European, and North American versions of PlayStation Home.

== Downloadable content ==
On July 31, 2009, Doublesix announced an upcoming downloadable content pack named Burn Zombie Burn! In Space which included two new levels set on an alien spaceship. In February 2010 Doublesix announced that the DLC was awaiting approval from Sony, as was a patch that would include a new game mode. In March it was announced that the DLC had passed submission at Sony Europe.

Burn Zombie Burn! In Space was released on the PlayStation Network on June 7, 2010, in North America.

A second downloadable content pack named Burn Zombie Burn! Zombie Sushi was announced, but was repeatedly delayed and was never released.

== Reception ==
Reception

Aggregate scores
Aggregator	Score
GameRankings	76%
Metacritic	76/100

Review scores
Publication	Score
1Up.com	B+
GameSpot	7.0/10
IGN	8.3/10

Burn Zombie Burn has received positive reviews with an aggregate score of 76 on Metacritic. IGN gave the game an 8.3/10 and commented that "Where Burn, Zombie, Burn really works best is its simple but flexible set of rules: burn stuff, but don't let the fires get out of control" and " there's a ton of stuff to check out for a downloadable game, but be prepared to spend days if not weeks trying to unlock it all." GameSpot gave the game a 7/10 and commented that "It's short on variety, but an innovative risk-vs.-reward scoring system makes Burn Zombie Burn an intriguing entry in the top-down shooter genre."
