= Formula One video games =

Ever since Pole Position in 1982, Formula One (F1) has always played a part of the racing genre in video games. Early Formula One games were typically arcade racing games, before Formula One Grand Prix (1991) popularized Formula One racing simulations on home computers.

== History ==
=== Early roots and arcade games (1974–1990s) ===
The roots of Formula One games can be traced back to 1974, with arcade racing games such as Speed Race by Taito and Gran Trak 10 by Atari which depicted F1-like cars going on a race track.

Two years later, F-1 (1976) by Namco has been cited as the first truly Formula One arcade game, but it was an electro-mechanical game, rather than an arcade video game.

The first successful Formula One video game in arcade history was Pole Position (1982), by Namco. In Pole Position, the player has to complete a lap in a certain amount of time in order to qualify for a race at the Fuji racetrack. After qualifying, the player had to face other cars in a championship race. The game was very successful and it spawned an official sequel, Pole Position II, and an unofficial one, Final Lap. After the success of Pole Position, many similar games appeared in arcades (and later ported to home computers) such as TX-1 (1983).

During the late 1980s, successful arcade games included Super Sprint, which uses the top view instead of the rear view of most games, and its sequel Championship Sprint.

From the second part of the 1980s more games were being created. Most of these games featured racetracks, cars and driver names similar to the real ones, but all modified slightly, since they did not have official licenses from FIA. Examples of this are Super Monaco GP (1989) and its sequel Ayrton Senna's Super Monaco GP II (1992), which had a license to display only Ayrton Senna's name), or Nigel Mansell's World Championship, but many other less known games had similar features.

Formula One racing games made the transition to 3D computer graphics with Namco's arcade game Winning Run (1988). Later arcade manufacturers began developing games in this style, like Sega with its Virtua Racing (1992), and later Namco again with Ace Driver (1994), which featured futuristic, F1-like cars.

Formula One began officially licensing video games in the early 1990s, starting with Video System's arcade game F-1 Grand Prix (1991). It was ported to the SNES by Nintendo, and spawned two sequels and a Super Mario Kart-style spinoff.

=== Dawn of F1 home computer games (1980s–1990s) ===
The first true Formula One racing simulators on home computers were Chequered Flag (1983) and Geoff Crammond's Formula One Grand Prix (F1GP) in 1991. Chequered Flag featured fuel depletion and car damage, and a set of several real circuits. Previously, most racing games representing Formula One, such as Accolade's Grand Prix Circuit and Electronic Arts' Ferrari Formula One, had been arcade-style games, but F1GP paid more attention to the physics of the cars, in addition to innovative graphics and accurate rendering of the actual racing tracks. The game, released in 1992, was based on the 1991 season. Over the years, the game had sequels Grand Prix 2, 3, and 4 (based on 1994, 1998, with a 2000 update, and 2001 respectively).

The F1 official license was also held by Ubisoft and later transferred to Electronic Arts, which published seasonal simulations and also F1 Challenge '99-'02.

A notable place on PC simulation games is held by Papyrus' Grand Prix Legends, which depicted the 1967 Formula One season instead of the then-current season, like all other contemporaries. It recreates in a very accurate way the physics of the car and the feel of driving a real 1967 Formula One racer. The game still has a vast popularity among video gamers, with many mods and original circuits being produced.

=== Console gaming and Sony exclusivity (1990s–2000s) ===
The first half of the 1990s saw a growing in popularity of Formula One games, and many software houses began acquiring licences and display most real names and cars, for example Formula One by Domark, which featured most real tracks, drivers and teams.

The first 3D games to feature a full license were F1 Challenge (1995) for the Sega Saturn, and Formula 1 (1996) developed by Bizarre Creations for the PlayStation, the first game of the successful Formula One series. Despite the game being a mostly arcade game rather than a simulation, it was very well received; later the series moved towards a more realistic race approach. Other Formula One games released in the late 1990s include EA Sports F1 Series (which runs from the 1999–2002 F1 season with all drivers from each season).

Sony had held an exclusive license to make Formula One games from 2003 until 2006, releasing sequels to Formula 1 on its PlayStation systems roughly at an annual pace throughout that time to form its Formula One series, as well as licensing the release of Infogrames' 2003 PS2-exclusive game Grand Prix Challenge, developed by Melbourne House. Challenge was well received by critics, particularly its high quality graphics for its time, despite being unknown to most F1 gaming fans.

=== Codemasters takes control (2009–2021) ===
Sony concluded their Formula One series with the releases of Formula One 06 on the PS2 and PSP and Formula One Championship Edition on the PlayStation 3. In 2008, Codemasters obtained the F1 license, beginning their own annual Formula One video game series. The first game of the series, F1 2009, was released on the Wii, PlayStation Portable and iOS, with the Wii version supporting the Wii Wheel for motion-controlled steering. Subsequent annual sequels were released on non-Nintendo consoles and personal computers, with F1 2011 also being available on eighth-generation handhelds and F1 2016 also available as a paid mobile title on iOS and Android. Besides the Wii U port of the F1 Race Stars spin-off, subtitled Powered-Up Edition, no other Codemasters F1 game has been available on a Nintendo console.

While Formula One games in general are strict reproductions of the sport regardless of gameplay style, Codemasters' F1 Race Stars was the first to bring Mario Kart-style gameplay to the setting, while their official license from FIA (which the company has held since 2009) allowed for the teams (complete with their respective sponsors) and drivers from that year's season to be given a cartoonish makeover.

=== Return to Electronic Arts (2021–present) ===
In late 2020, Electronic Arts acquired Codemasters after outbidding Take-Two Interactive's offer to buy the company. As a result, all subsequent installments of Codemasters' ongoing F1 video game series, starting with the 2021 season's game, are published by Electronic Arts, making this the first F1 game to be published by the company in nearly two decades, after F1 Career Challenge and F1 Challenge '99-'02. The 2021 game is also the first to be released on ninth-generation consoles, the PlayStation 5 and Xbox Series X/S.

While Electronic Arts publishes the main F1 racing games, Frontier Developments developed and published the management simulator F1 Manager 2022, which holds the official license for the 2022 season. Frontier developed and published three installments of the F1 Manager franchise.

== Modding ==
Owing to the popularity of the sport, the technical and legal limitations of earlier titles (such as the omission of alcohol and tobacco branding) and lack of representation of particular seasons, the act of modding video games to feature specific seasons of Formula 1 has been popular since the 1990s, particularly following the releases of Grand Prix 2 in 1996 and Grand Prix Legends in 1998. Later on, ISIMotor-derived titles such as F1 Challenge '99-'02 and rFactor would continue the trend, with cars reaching ever higher levels of accuracy, down to race-specific configurations in regards to sponsorship and aero packages. rFactor's development studio, Image Space Incorporated, would later work with the BMW Sauber F1 team to feature the team's cars as standalone downloadable content. Grand Prix 4, a sequel to the aforementioned Grand Prix 2, retains a popular modding scene, with newer Formula One seasons and other racing series being added. More recently, one of the more popular titles for modded Formula 1 seasons is the title Assetto Corsa, released in 2014.

In addition to simulation-based titles and even outside the racing genre, Formula 1 cars have been made available as mods in many different video games over the years, either through models ported from pre-existing titles (such as EA Sports' F1 Championship Season 2000), or scratchbuilt. Due to their prevalence and real-world performance, these cars are popular choices to mod into games such as the Need for Speed and Grand Theft Auto franchises. The 2002 freeware title GeneRally also features a large range of Formula 1 seasons available for download, each car rendered in just 40 polygons.

== List ==
A list of Formula One video games that lists only those uses the F1 name, whether it is licensed by the Formula One Group or just F1 in name; is licensed by racing drivers and teams involved within the series otherwise featuring sprites that resemble a Formula One car in a way to get around licensing, featuring deliberately misspelt driver and team names; is named after a Grand Prix race that appear in the F1 calendar or those that features races that appear in the F1 calendar.

Title	Platform(s)	Release date	Developer / Publisher	Formula 1 season
F-1	Arcade	1976	Namco / Atari	No license
Monaco GP	Arcade, SG-1000	1979	Sega / Gremlin Industries	No license
Monte Carlo	Arcade	1980	Atari	No license
Pro Monaco GP	Arcade	1980	Sega	No license
Monza G.P.	Arcade	1981	Olympia	No license
Turbo	Arcade, Intellivision, Colecovision	1981	Sega	No license
Pole Position	Arcade	1982	Namco / Atari	No license
Brands Deluxe	Commodore 64	1983	Alligata	No license
Grand Prix	Commodore 64	1983	MRH	No license
Grand Prix	Commodore 64	1983	C.R. Wright	No license
Chequered Flag	ZX Spectrum	1983	Steve Kelly	No license
Pole Position II	Arcade, Atari 7800, Commodore 64	1983	Namco / Atari	No license
TX-1	Arcade	1983	Namco / Atari	No license
Grand Prix	Commodore 64	1984	Ellis Horwood	No license
Grand Prix Manager	ZX Spectrum	1984	Silicon Joy	No license
F-1 Race	NES, Game Boy	1984	Nintendo	No license
Scalextric: The Computer Edition	Commodore 64, Amstrad CPC, ZX Spectrum	1985	Leisure Genius	No license
Formula 1 Simulator	Commodore 64, Commodore 16, Plus/4, Amstrad CPC, MSX, ZX Spectrum	1985	Spirit Software/Mastertronic	No license
Formula One	Amstrad CPC, ZX Spectrum	1985	G.B. Munday and B.P. Wheelhouse/CRL Group	No license
Grand Prix	Commodore 64	1986	Systems Editoriale	No license
Grand Prix Simulator	Commodore 64, Amstrad CPC, ZX Spectrum	1986	Codemasters	No license
Home Hungaroring	Commodore 64	1986	Kerszi	No license
World Grand Prix	Master System	1986	Sega	No license
Continental Circus	Arcade	1987	Taito	No license
Final Lap	Arcade	1987	Namco	No license
F1 Spirit: The Road to Formula 1	MSX	1987	Konami	No license
Famicom Grand Prix: F1 Race	Famicom Disk System	1987	Nintendo	No license
Nigel Mansell's Grand Prix	Amiga, Atari ST, Amstrad CPC, ZX Spectrum	1987	Martech	No license
Grand Prix Circuit	MS-DOS, Amiga, Amstrad CPC, Commodore 64, ZX	1988	Distinctive Software / Accolade	No license
Grand Prix Simulator II	Commodore 64, Amstrad CPC, ZX Spectrum	1988	Oliver Twins / Codemasters	No license
F-1 Dream	Arcade	1988	Capcom / Romstar	No license
F-1 Spirit: 3D Special	MSX	1988	Konami	No license
Ferrari Formula One	MS-DOS, Amiga, Amstrad CPC, Commodore 64, ZX Spectrum	June 1, 1988	Electronic Arts	No license
Grand Prix	Amstrad CPC, Commodore 64, ZX Spectrum	1988	D&H Games	No license
Satoru Nakajima: F-1 Hero	NES	1988	American Sammy / Varie	No license
Winning Run	Arcade	1988	Namco	No license
F.1 Manager	Amiga, Atari ST, Commodore 64	1989	Simulmondo	No license
Tail to Nose: Great Championship	Arcade	1989	Video System	No license
Super Monaco GP	Arcade, Genesis, Amiga, Amstrad CPC, Atari ST, Commodore 64, Game Gear	1989	Sega	No license
F-1 Dream	PC Engine	1989	NEC Avenue	No license
F-1 Pilot	PC Engine	1989	Pack-In-Video	No license
Driver's Eyes	Arcade	1990	Namco	No license
F1 Circus	PC Engine; NES	September 14, 1990	Nichibutsu	No license
Final Lap 2	Arcade	1990	Namco	No license
Formula One: Built to Win	NES	1990	SETA	No license
F1 Circus '91	PC Engine	July 21, 1991	Nichibutsu	No license
F1 Circus MD	Genesis	December 20, 1991	Micronics	No license
Satoru Nakajima F-1 Hero GB World Championship '91	Game Boy	December 27, 1991	Varie	No license
Formula 1 3D: F1 Manager II	Commodore 64	1991	Simulmondo	No license
Super Grand Prix	Amiga, Atari ST	1991	Codemasters	No license
F1 Exhaust Note	Arcade	1991	Sega	1991
F-1 Grand Prix	Arcade, SNES	1991	Video System	1991
F1 Grand Prix: Satoru Nakajima	Genesis	1991	Varie	1991
Fastest 1	Genesis	1991	Human Entertainment	1990
Satoru Nakajima F-1 Hero 2	NES	1991	Varie	No license
Slicks	Commodore 64, Amstrad CPC, ZX Spectrum	1991	Oliver Twins / Codemasters	No license
Al Unser Jr.'s Turbo Racing	NES	1991	Data East	No license
Aguri Suzuki F-1 Super Driving	SNES	1992	Genki	No license
F-1 Grand Prix Part II	Arcade, SNES	1992	Video System	1992
F1 Circus Special: Pole to Win	PC Engine	June 26, 1992	Nichibutsu	No license
F1 Circus '92	PC Engine	December 18, 1992	Nichibutsu	No license
F-1 Hero MD	Genesis	1992	Varie	1992
F1 Super License: Nakajima Satoru	Genesis	1992	Varie	1992
F1 Pole Position	SNES	1992	Human Entertainment	1992
Final Lap 3	Arcade	1992	Namco	No license
Grand Prix	MS-DOS, Atari ST, Amiga	1992	MicroProse, Geoff Crammond	No license
Nigel Mansell's World Championship	MS-DOS, Amiga, Atari ST, Genesis, NES, ZX Spectrum	1992	Gremlin Graphics / Gremlin Interactive	No license
Ayrton Senna's Super Monaco GP II	Master System, Genesis, Game Gear	July 1992	Sega	No license
Ferrari Grand Prix Challenge	NES, Game Boy	1992	System 3 / Acclaim Entertainment	No license
Grand Prix Unlimited	MS-DOS	1992	Accolade	1991
Exhaust Heat	SNES	1992	SETA	No license
Hungaroring	Commodore 64	1992	Novotrade	No license
Satoru Nakajima F-1 Hero GB '92: The Graded Driver	Game Boy	1992	Varie	No license
Super F1 Circus	SNES	July 24, 1992	Nichibutsu	No license
Super F1 Circus Limited	SNES	October 23, 1992	Nichibutsu	No license
F1 Hero MD	Genesis	1992	Aisystem / Varie	No license
F1 Super License: Nakajima Satoru	Genesis	1992	Varie	1992
Super F1 Hero	SNES	December 18, 1992	Varie	No license
Overtake	Arcade	1992	Zoom	1992
F1 Super Lap	Arcade	1992	Sega	1992
F-1 Grand Prix Star II	Arcade	1993	Jaleco	1992
Formula 1 Sensation	NES	1993	Konami	No license
Formula One	MS-DOS, Master System, Genesis, Game Gear, Amiga	1993	Atari / Domark	1993
F1 Pole Position 2	SNES	1993	Human Entertainment	1993
F1-Racer	Amiga	1994	F1 Licenceware	No license
Final Lap R	Arcade	1993	Namco	1993
Gerhard Berger's Formula 1 Quiz	Commodore 64	1993	Austriasoft	No license
Super F1 Circus 2	SNES	July 29, 1993	Nichibutsu	No license
F1 Circus CD	Sega CD	March 18, 1994	Nichibutsu	No license
F-1 Super Battle	Arcade	February 1994	Jaleco	1993
Formula One World Championship: Beyond the Limit	Sega CD	1994	Sega	1993
F-1 Grand Prix Part III	SNES	1994	Video System	1991–1993
Human Grand Prix III: F1 Triple Battle	SNES	1994	Human Entertainment	1994
Nakajima Satoru F-1 Hero '94	SNES	1994	Varie	No license
Super F1 Circus 3	SNES	July 14, 1994	Nichibutsu	No license
Grand Prix Manager	MS-DOS	1995	MicroProse	1995+
F1 World Championship Edition	Amiga, Genesis	1995	Peakstar / Domark	1994
F1 Challenge	Sega Saturn	1995	Virgin Interactive	1995
Human Grand Prix IV: F1 Dream Battle	SNES	1995	Human Entertainment	1995
SD F-1 Grand Prix	SNES	1995	Human Entertainment	No license
Slipstream	Arcade	1995	Capcom	No license
Super F1 Circus Gaiden	SNES	July 7, 1995	Nichibutsu	No license
Grand Prix 2	MS-DOS	August 30, 1996	Geoff Crammond, MicroProse	1994
Grand Prix Manager 2	Windows	1996	Edward Grabowski / MicroProse	1996+
F-1 Grand Prix 1996 - Team Unei Simulation	PlayStation	1996	Coconuts	1996
Formula One Masters	Amiga	1996	Amivision / ESP	No license
F1 Manager 96	Windows	1996	Software 2000 / EuroPress	1996+
Pole Position/Team F1 (Manager)	Windows	1996	Ascon GmbH / Electronic Arts, Ascon GmbH	1995+
Formula 1	Windows, PlayStation	September 1996	Bizarre Creations / Psygnosis	1995
Power F1	Windows	April 1997	Teque London / Eidos	1995
Formula Circus	PlayStation	May 2, 1997	Nichibutsu	No license
F1 Manager Professional	Windows	1997	Software 2000 / EuroPress	No license
Formula Grand Prix: Team Unei Simulation 2	PlayStation	1997	Coconuts	No license
Tactics Formula	Sega Saturn	1997	Aki Corporation	No license
Formula 1 97	Windows, PlayStation	September 26, 1997	Bizarre Creations / Psygnosis	1997
F1 Pole Position 64	Nintendo 64	October 1997	Human Entertainment / Ubisoft	1996
F1 Racing Simulation	Windows	December 31, 1997	Bizarre Creations / Ubisoft	1996
Prost Grand Prix	Windows	1998	Visiware / Infogrames, Canal+	No license
Racing Simulation 2	Windows	1998	Ubisoft	No license
F-1 World Grand Prix	Nintendo 64, Arcade; Dreamcast, PlayStation; Windows, Game Boy Color	July 27, 1998; 1999; 2000	Paradigm Entertainment, Lankhor / Eidos Interactive, Video System, Sega	1997 (N64); 1998 (DC, GBC); 1999 (PS, PC)
Johnny Herbert's Grand Prix Championship 1998	Windows	September 30, 1998	Midas Interactive Entertainment	No license
Grand Prix Legends	Windows	October 1998	Papyrus / Sierra Entertainment	1967
Formula 1 98	PlayStation	November 30, 1998	Visual Science / Psygnosis	1998
Official Formula One Racing	Windows	1999	Lankhor / Eidos Interactive	1998
Monaco Grand Prix: Racing Simulation 2	Windows, PlayStation, Nintendo 64	June 1999	Ubisoft	No license
Grand Prix World	Windows	June 1999	Edward Grabowski / Microprose, Hasbro Interactive	1998+
F-1 World Grand Prix II	Nintendo 64; Dreamcast, Game Boy Color	September 30, 1999; 2000	Paradigm Entertainment, Video System	1998 (N64); 1999 (DC, GBC)
Formula One 99	Windows, PlayStation	October 1999	Studio 33 / Psygnosis	1999
F1 2000	Windows, PlayStation	March 2000	Visual Science / EA Sports	2000
F1 Racing Championship	Windows, PlayStation, PlayStation 2, Nintendo 64, Game Boy Color, Dreamcast	April 30, 2000	Ubisoft / Video System	1999
Grand Prix 3	Windows	July 28, 2000	Geoff Crammond, MicroProse / Hasbro Interactive	1998
Formula One 2000	PlayStation, Game Boy Color	October 6, 2000	Studio 33 / SCE	2000
F1 Manager (F1 Manager 2001)	Windows	October 13, 2000 (re-released September 21, 2001)	Intelligent Games / EA Sports	1999+
F1 Championship Season 2000	Windows, PlayStation, PlayStation 2, Game Boy Color	December 19, 2000	Visual Science / EA Sports	2000
F1 World Grand Prix 2000	Windows, PlayStation	February 21, 2001	Eutechnyx / Eidos Interactive	2000
Formula One 2001	PlayStation, PlayStation 2	May 21, 2001	Studio Liverpool / SCEE	2001
Grand Prix 3 Season 2000	Windows	August 2001	MicroProse / Atari	2000
F1 2001	Windows, PlayStation 2, Xbox	October 2001	ISI / EA Sports	2001
Williams F1 Team Driver	Windows	December 2001	KnowWonder / THQ	2001
F1 2002	Windows, PlayStation 2, Xbox, GameCube, Game Boy Advance	June 2002	ISI, Magic Pockets / EA Sports	2002
Formula One Arcade	PlayStation	September 2002	Studio 33 / SCE	2001
Grand Prix 4	Windows	September 10, 2002	Geoff Crammond, MicroProse / Infogrames	2001
Formula One 2002	PlayStation 2	November 1, 2002	Studio Liverpool / SCEE	2002
Grand Prix Challenge	PlayStation 2	November 21, 2002	Melbourne House, Infogrames / Atari	2002
F1 Challenge '99-'02; F1 Career Challenge	Windows; PlayStation 2, Xbox, GameCube	May 13, 2003; June 9, 2003	ISI / EA Sports; Visual Science / EA Sports	1999–2002
Formula One 2003	PlayStation 2	July 11, 2003	Studio Liverpool / SCEE	2003
Formula One 04	PlayStation 2	September 22, 2004	Studio Liverpool / SCEE	2004
F1 Manager Online	Windows	June 2005	F1-TM	No license
Formula One 05	PlayStation 2	July 1, 2005	Studio Liverpool / SCEE	2005
F1 Grand Prix	PlayStation Portable	September 1, 2005	Traveller's Tales / Sony CEE	2005
Formula One 06	PlayStation 2, PlayStation Portable	July 28, 2006	Studio Liverpool / SCE	2006
Formula One Championship Edition	PlayStation 3	December 28, 2006	Studio Liverpool / SCE	2006
Pole Position: Remix	iOS	September 14, 2008	NAMCO	No license
F1 2009	Wii, PlayStation Portable, iOS	November 17, 2009	Sumo Digital / Codemasters	2009
F1 2010	Windows, PlayStation 3, Xbox 360, iOS	September 24, 2010	Codemasters	2010
iGP Manager	Windows, Android, iOS	2011	iGP Games	No license
F1 2011	Windows, PlayStation 3, PlayStation Vita, Nintendo 3DS, Xbox 360, iOS	September 20, 2011	Codemasters	2011
F1 Online: The Game	Windows	June 26, 2012	Codemasters	2011
F1 2012	Windows, PlayStation 3, Xbox 360	September 18, 2012	Codemasters	2012
F1 Race Stars	Windows, PlayStation 3, Xbox 360, iOS	November 13, 2012	Codemasters	2012
F1 Challenge	Android, iOS	2013	Codemasters	2012
F1 2013	Windows, PlayStation 3, Xbox 360	October 4, 2013	Codemasters	2013 (Note: This title features cars from older seasons.)
F1 Race Stars: Powered Up Edition	Wii U	January 16, 2014	Codemasters	2012
F1 2014	Windows, PlayStation 3, Xbox 360	October 17, 2014	Codemasters	2014
Cockpit Manager 14	Windows	April 11, 2014	Cartola Games	2014
F1 2015	Windows, PlayStation 4, Xbox One	July 10, 2015	Codemasters	2014–2015
F1 2016	Windows, PlayStation 4, Xbox One, Android, iOS, tvOS	August 19, 2016	Codemasters	2016
F1 2017	Windows, PlayStation 4, Xbox One	August 25, 2017	Codemasters	2017
F1 2018	Windows, PlayStation 4, Xbox One	August 24, 2018	Codemasters	2018
F1 Mobile Racing	Android, iOS	October 18, 2018	Codemasters	2018–2023
F1 Clash	Android, iOS	May 10, 2019	Hutch Games	2019–2026
F1 2019	Windows, PlayStation 4, Xbox One	June 28, 2019	Codemasters	2019
Real Racing 3	Android, iOS	November 25, 2019	Firemonkeys / EA Sports	2019–2024
F1 2020	Windows, PlayStation 4, Xbox One, Stadia	July 10, 2020	Codemasters	2020
F1 2021	Windows, PlayStation 4, PlayStation 5, Xbox One, Xbox Series X/S	July 16, 2021	Codemasters / EA Sports	2020–2021
F1 22	Windows, PlayStation 4, PlayStation 5, Xbox One, Xbox Series X/S	July 1, 2022	Codemasters / EA Sports	2022
F1 Manager 2022	Windows, PlayStation 4, PlayStation 5, Xbox One, Xbox Series X/S	August 30, 2022	Frontier Developments	2022
F1 23	Windows, PlayStation 4, PlayStation 5, Xbox One, Xbox Series X/S	June 16, 2023	Codemasters / EA Sports	2022–2023
F1 Manager 2023	Windows, PlayStation 4, PlayStation 5, Xbox One, Xbox Series X/S	August 31, 2023	Frontier Developments	2023
F1 24	Windows, PlayStation 4, PlayStation 5, Xbox One, Xbox Series X/S	May 31, 2024	Codemasters / EA Sports	2024
F1 Manager 2024	Windows, PlayStation 4, PlayStation 5, Xbox One, Xbox Series X/S	July 23, 2024	Frontier Developments	2024
F1 25	Windows, PlayStation 5, Xbox Series X/S	May 30, 2025	Codemasters / EA Sports	2024–2026
