= List of PC games (F) =

The following page is an alphabetical section from the list of PC games.

== F ==
Name	Developer	Publisher	Genre(s)	Operating system(s)	Date released	Ref.
F-1 World Grand Prix	Lankhor	NA/EU|Eidos Interactive|JP|Tsukuda Original	Sim racing	Microsoft Windows	16 June 2000	
F1 2000	Image Space Incorporated	EA Sports	Racing	Microsoft Windows	24 March 2000	
F1 2002	Image Space Incorporated	EA Sports	Racing	Microsoft Windows	6 June 2002	
F1 2010	Codemasters Birmingham	Codemasters	Racing	Microsoft Windows	22 September 2010	
F1 2011	Codemasters Birmingham	Codemasters	Racing	Microsoft Windows	20 September 2011	
F1 2012	Codemasters Birmingham; Feral Interactive	Codemasters; Feral Interactive	Racing	Microsoft Windows, Mac OS X	18 September 2012	
F1 2013	Codemasters Birmingham; Feral Interactive	Codemasters; Feral Interactive	Racing	Microsoft Windows, Mac OS X	4 October 2013	
F1 2014	Codemasters Birmingham	Codemasters	Racing	Microsoft Windows	2 October 2014	
F1 2015	Codemasters Birmingham	Codemasters; Feral Interactive	Racing	Microsoft Windows, Linux	10 July 2015	
F1 2016	Codemasters Birmingham	Codemasters	Racing	Microsoft Windows, macOS	19 August 2016	
F1 2017	Codemasters Birmingham	Codemasters	Racing	Microsoft Windows, macOS, Linux	25 August 2017	
F1 2018	Codemasters Birmingham	Codemasters	Racing	Microsoft Windows	24 August 2018	
F1 2019	Codemasters Birmingham	Codemasters	Racing	Microsoft Windows	28 June 2019	
F1 2020	Codemasters Birmingham	Codemasters	Racing	Microsoft Windows	10 July 2020	
F1 2021	Codemasters	EA Sports	Racing	Microsoft Windows	16 July 2021	
F1 22	Codemasters	EA Sports	Racing	Microsoft Windows	1 July 2022	
F1 23	Codemasters	EA Sports	Racing	Microsoft Windows	16 June 2023	
F1 24	Codemasters	EA Sports	Racing	Microsoft Windows	31 May 2024	
F1 Career Challenge	Image Space Incorporated	EA Sports	Racing	Microsoft Windows	23 June 2003	
F1 Manager (2000)	Intelligent Games	EA Sports	Racing	Microsoft Windows	6 October 2000	
F1 Manager 2022	Frontier Developments	Frontier Developments	Racing Management	Microsoft Windows	30 August 2022	
F1 Manager 2023	Frontier Developments	Frontier Developments	Racing Management	Microsoft Windows	31 July 2023	
F1 Manager 2024	Frontier Developments	Frontier Developments	Racing Management	Microsoft Windows	23 July 2024	
F1 Race Stars	Codemasters Birmingham	Codemasters	Kart racing	Microsoft Windows	13 November 2012	
F1 Racing Championship	Ubisoft Shanghai|Ubisoft Milan	Video System|Ubisoft	Sim racing	Microsoft Windows	15 September 2000	
Frank Herbert's Dune	Widescreen Games	Cryo Interactive, DreamCatcher Interactive	Adventure	Microsoft Windows	14 November 2001	
Factorio	Wube Software	Wube Software	RTS	Microsoft Windows, Linux, macOS	2015	
Fade to Black	Delphine Software International	Electronic Arts	Action-adventure	MS-DOS	31 August 1995	
A Fairy Tale	Reflexive Entertainment	Reflexive Entertainment	Matching	Microsoft Windows, macOS	12 March 2009	
Fallout	Interplay Productions	Bethesda Softworks	Role-playing	Microsoft Windows	1 November 1997	
Fallout 2	Black Isle Studios	Bethesda Softworks	Role-playing	Microsoft Windows	1 December 1998	
Fallout 3	Bethesda Game Studios	Bethesda Softworks	Role-playing	Microsoft Windows	28 October 2008	
Fallout 4	Bethesda Game Studios	Bethesda Softworks	Role-playing	Microsoft Windows	10 November 2015	
Fallout: New Vegas	Obsidian Entertainment	Namco Bandai Games, Bethesda Softworks	Role-playing	Microsoft Windows	19 October 2010	
Fallout Shelter	Bethesda Game Studios, Behaviour Interactive	Bethesda Softworks	Construction and management simulation, survival	Microsoft Windows	July 14, 2016	
Fallout Tactics: Brotherhood of Steel	Micro Forté	14 Degrees East	TRPG	Microsoft Windows	15 March 2001	
Far Cry	Crytek	Ubisoft	First-person shooter	Microsoft Windows	12 March 2004	
Far Cry 2	Ubisoft Montreal	Ubisoft	First-person shooter	Microsoft Windows	21 October 2008	
Far Cry 3	Ubisoft Montreal	Ubisoft	First-person shooter	Microsoft Windows	29 November 2012	
Far Cry 3: Blood Dragon	Ubisoft Montreal, Ubisoft Shanghai	Ubisoft	First-person shooter	Microsoft Windows	1 May 2013	
Far Cry 4	Ubisoft Montreal	Ubisoft	First-person shooter, Action-adventure	Microsoft Windows	18 November 2014	
Far Cry 5	Ubisoft Montreal; Ubisoft Toronto	Ubisoft	First-person shooter	Microsoft Windows	27 March 2018	
Far Cry 6	Ubisoft Toronto	Ubisoft	First-person shooter	Microsoft Windows	7 October 2021	
Far Cry Primal	Ubisoft Montreal	Ubisoft	Action-adventure	Microsoft Windows	23 February 2016	
Fatal Fury: City of the Wolves	SNK	SNK	Fighting	Microsoft Windows	24 April 2025	
Fez	Polytron Corporation	Trapdoor	Puzzle-platform	Windows, Linux, OS X	1 May 2013	
Fiesta Online	Ons On Soft	Ons On Soft, Gamigo AG	Massively multiplayer online role-playing	Microsoft Windows	7 November 2007	
FIFA 06	EA Canada	Electronic Arts	Sports	Microsoft Windows	10 October 2005	
FIFA 08	EA Canada	EA Sports	Sports	Microsoft Windows	27 September 2007	
FIFA 09	EA Canada	EA Sports	Sports	Microsoft Windows	2 October 2008	
FIFA 10	HB Studios	EA Sports	Sports	Microsoft Windows	1 October 2009	
FIFA 11	EA Canada	EA Sports	Sports	Microsoft Windows	28 September 2010	
FIFA 12	EA Canada	EA Sports	Sports	Microsoft Windows, Mac OS X	27 September 2011	
FIFA 13	EA Canada	EA Sports	Sports	Microsoft Windows	25 September 2012	
FIFA 14	EA Canada	EA Sports	Sports	Microsoft Windows	24 September 2013	
FIFA 15	EA Canada	EA Sports	Sports	Microsoft Windows	23 September 2014	
FIFA 16	EA Canada	EA Sports	Sports	Microsoft Windows	22 September 2015	
FIFA 17	EA Vancouver; EA Romania	EA Sports	Sports	Microsoft Windows	27 September 2016	
FIFA 18	EA Vancouver; EA Romania	EA Sports	Sports	Microsoft Windows	29 September 2017	
FIFA 19	EA Vancouver; EA Romania	EA Sports	Sports	Microsoft Windows	28 September 2018	
FIFA 20	EA Vancouver; EA Romania	EA Sports	Sports	Microsoft Windows	27 September 2019	
FIFA 2000	EA Canada	EA Sports	Sports	Microsoft Windows	26 October 1999	
FIFA 2001	EA Canada	EA Sports	Sports	Microsoft Windows	31 October 2000	
FIFA 21	EA Vancouver; EA Romania	EA Sports	Sports	Microsoft Windows	9 October 2020	
FIFA 22	EA Vancouver; EA Romania	EA Sports	Sports	Microsoft Windows	1 October 2021	
FIFA 23	EA Vancouver; EA Romania	EA Sports	Sports	Microsoft Windows	30 September 2022	
FIFA 97	EA Canada; Extended Play Productions	EA Sports	Sports	Microsoft Windows, DOS	20 November 1996	
FIFA 99	EA Canada	EA Sports	Sports	Microsoft Windows	4 December 1998	
FIFA Football 2002'	EA Canada	EA Sports	Sports	Microsoft Windows	30 October 2001	
FIFA Football 2003	EA Canada	EA Sports	Sports	Microsoft Windows	25 October 2002	
FIFA Football 2004	EA Canada	EA Sports	Sports	Microsoft Windows	7 November 2003	
FIFA Football 2005	EA Canada	EA Sports	Sports	Microsoft Windows	4 October 2004	
FIFA International Soccer	Extended Play Productions; Creative Assembly	EA Sports	Sports	MS-DOS, Amiga	1994	
FIFA: Road to World Cup 98	EA Canada	EA Sports	Sports	Microsoft Windows	November 1997	
FIFA World	EA Canada	EA Sports	Sports	Microsoft Windows	12 November 2013	
Final Doom	TeamTNT	id Software	First-person shooter	MS-DOS	17 June 1996	
Final Fantasy	Square Enix	Square Enix	Role-playing	Microsoft Windows	12 August 2021	
Final Fantasy II	Square Enix	Square Enix	Role-playing	Microsoft Windows	28 July 2021	
Final Fantasy III	Square Enix	Square Enix	Role-playing	Microsoft Windows	27 May 2014	
Final Fantasy IV	Square Enix	Square Enix	Role-playing	Microsoft Windows	17 September 2014	
Final Fantasy IV: The After Years	Square Enix	Square Enix	Role-playing	Microsoft Windows	12 May 2015	
Final Fantasy V	Square Enix	Square Enix	Role-playing	Microsoft Windows	10 November 2021	
Final Fantasy VI	Square Enix	Square Enix	Role-playing	Microsoft Windows	13 February 2022	
Final Fantasy VII	Square Product Development Division 1	Square, Square Enix, Eidos Interactive	Role-playing	Microsoft Windows	31 May 1998	
Final Fantasy VII Remake Intergrade	Square Enix	Square Enix	Action role-playing	Microsoft Windows	22 June 2022	
Final Fantasy VIII	Square Product Development Division 1	Square, Square Enix	Role-playing	Microsoft Windows	11 February 1999	
Final Fantasy IX	Square Enix	Square Enix	Role-playing	Microsoft Windows	14 April 2016	
Final Fantasy X/X-2 HD Remaster	Square Enix	Square Enix	Role-playing	Microsoft Windows	12 May 2016	
Final Fantasy XI	Square Product Development Division 3, Square Enix Product Development Division 3 (as of April 1, 2003)	Square, Square Enix	Role-playing	Microsoft Windows	16 May 2002	
Final Fantasy XIII	Square Enix	Square Enix	Role-playing	Microsoft Windows	9 October 2014	
Final Fantasy XIII-2	Square Enix	Square Enix	Role-playing	Microsoft Windows	11 December 2014	
Final Fantasy XIV	Square Enix	Square Enix	Massively multiplayer online role-playing	Microsoft Windows	18 February 2014	
Final Fantasy XV	Square Enix	Square Enix	Action role-playing	Microsoft Windows	6 March 2018	
Final Fantasy XVI	Square Enix Creative Business Unit III	Square Enix	Action role-playing	Microsoft Windows	17 September 2024	
Final Fantasy Type 0	Square Enix	Square Enix	Role-playing	Microsoft Windows	18 August 2015	
Firefall	Red 5 Studios	Red 5 Studios	MMOFPS	Microsoft Windows	29 July 2014	
F.I.S.T.: Forged In Shadow Torch	TiGames	Bilibili	Metroidvania	Microsoft Windows	3 October 2021	
Fistful of Frags	FoF Developer Team	FoF Developer Team, Valve	First-person shooter	Microsoft Windows, Linux, macOS	20 December 2007	
Five Nights at Freddy's	Scott Cawthon	Scott Cawthon	Survival horror	Microsoft Windows, Linux	8 August 2014	
Five Nights at Freddy's 2	Scott Cawthon	Scott Cawthon	Survival horror	Microsoft Windows, Linux	10 November 2014	
Five Nights at Freddy's 3	Scott Cawthon	Scott Cawthon	Survival horror	Microsoft Windows, Linux	2 March 2015	
Five Nights at Freddy's 4	Scott Cawthon	Scott Cawthon	Survival horror	Microsoft Windows, Linux	23 July 2015	
Five Nights at Freddy's: Help Wanted	Steel Wool Studios	Steel Wool Studios	Survival horror	Microsoft Windows, Linux	28 May 2019	
Five Nights at Freddy's: Into the Pit	Mega Cat Studios	Mega Cat Studios	Horror, adventure	Microsoft Windows	7 August 2024	
Five Nights at Freddy's: Security Breach	Steel Wool Studios	ScottGames	Survival horror	Microsoft Windows, Linux	16 December 2021	
Five Nights at Freddy's: Sister Location	Steel Wool Studios	ScottGames	Survival horror	Microsoft Windows, Linux	7 October 2016	
FlatOut	Bugbear Entertainment	Valve, Empire Interactive, Konami	Racing, arcade	Microsoft Windows, Linux	5 November 2004	
FlatOut 2	Bugbear Entertainment	Valve, Empire Interactive, Konami	Racing, arcade	Microsoft Windows, Linux, macOS	30 June 2006	
FlatOut 3: Chaos & Destruction	Team6 Game Studios	Strategy First	Racing, arcade	Microsoft Windows	13 December 2011	
FlatOut: Ultimate Carnage	Bugbear Entertainment	Valve, Empire Interactive	Racing, arcade	Microsoft Windows	22 July 2007	
FNaF World	Scott Cawthon	Scott Cawthon	Role-playing	Microsoft Windows	21 January 2016	
For the Glory: A Europa Universalis Game	Crystal Empire Games	Paradox Interactive	Grand strategy	Microsoft Windows	11 November 2009	
Formula 1	Bizarre Creations	Psygnosis	Racing	Microsoft Windows	27 June 1997	
Formula 1 97 (Formula 1 Championship Edition in North America)	Bizarre Creations	Psygnosis	Racing	Microsoft Windows	17 June 1998	
Formula One 99	Studio 33	Psygnosis	Racing	Microsoft Windows	10 December 1999	
Forsaken	Probe Entertainment	Acclaim Entertainment	First-person shooter	Microsoft Windows	24 April 1998	
Forsaken Remastered	Nightdive Studios	Nightdive Studios	First-person shooter	Microsoft Windows, Linux, macOS	31 July 2018	
Forza Horizon 3	Playground Games	Microsoft Studios	Racing	Microsoft Windows	September 27, 2016	
Forza Horizon 4	Playground Games	Microsoft Studios	Racing	Microsoft Windows	October 2, 2018	
Forza Horizon 5	Playground Games	Xbox Game Studios	Racing	Microsoft Windows	November 9, 2021	
Forza Horizon 6	Playground Games	Xbox Game Studios	Racing	Microsoft Windows	May 15 2026	
Forza Motorsport	Turn 10 Studios	Xbox Game Studios	Sim racing	Microsoft Windows	10 October 2023	
Forza Motorsport 7	Turn 10 Studios	Microsoft Studios	Racing	Microsoft Windows	October 3, 2017	
The Forest	Endnight Games Ltd	Endnight Games Ltd	Survival horror	Microsoft Windows	30 May 2013	
A Fork in the Tale	Advance Reality Interactive	Any River Entertainment	Adventure	Microsoft Windows	February 28, 1997	
Fortnite	Epic Games, People Can Fly	Epic Games	co-op, sandbox, survival game	Microsoft Windows, macOS	July 25, 2017	
Fragile Allegiance	Gremlin Interactive	Gremlin Interactive, Interplay	4X, real-time strategy	Microsoft Windows, MS-DOS	December 1996	
Fragmented	Above and Beyond Technologies	Above and Beyond Technologies	Survival, role-playing	Microsoft Windows	26 March 2016	
Freedom Planet	GalaxyTrail	GalaxyTrail	Indie, platform	Microsoft Windows	21 July 2014	
Freedom Planet 2	GalaxyTrail	GalaxyTrail	Indie, platform	Microsoft Windows	13 September 2022	
Freelancer	Digital Anvil	Microsoft Game Studios	Space trading and combat simulator	Microsoft Windows	4 March 2003	
Friday Night Funkin': The Full Ass Game	Funkin' Crew Inc.	Funkin' Crew Inc.	Rhythm	Microsoft Windows, macOS, Linux	TBA	
FTL: Faster Than Light	Subset Games	Subset Games	Indie, simulation, strategy	Microsoft Windows, Linux, macOS	14 September 2012	
Fuga: Melodies of Steel	CyberConnect2	CyberConnect2	Tactical role-playing	Microsoft Windows	29 July 2021	
Fuga: Melodies of Steel 2	CyberConnect2	CyberConnect2	Tactical role-playing	Microsoft Windows	11 May 2023	
