= F1 2009 (video game) =

2009 video game

- Cover art (PAL Wii version)
- Developer: Sumo Digital
- Publisher: Codemasters
- Series: F1
- Engine: EGO Engine
- Platforms: Wii; PlayStation Portable iOS
- Release: PlayStation Portable, Wii: NA: 16 November 2009; PAL: 19 November 2009; UK: 20 November 2009; JP: 17 December 2009; iOS; 14 December 2009
- Genre: Sim racing
- Modes: Single-player, multiplayer

F1 2009 is a video game based on the 2009 season of the Formula One motor racing series. It was released on the Wii and PlayStation Portable in November 2009 for North America, PAL region and the United Kingdom. The game was also released on iOS on 14 December. The PlayStation Portable version was also available as a download from the PlayStation Store from 16 November.

This is the first game in Codemasters' F1 video game series upon acquiring the licensing rights for Formula One video games in 2008, with all subsequent sequels based on further F1 seasons released annually on non-Nintendo consoles and the PC. It eventually became the only F1 game to be available on the Wii and one of only three F1 games that Codemasters released for a Nintendo console, with the other two being the spin-off, F1 Race Stars, for the Wii U, and F1 2011, for the Nintendo 3DS.

== Development and features ==
F1 2009 marks the first time since Electronic Arts' F1 Challenge '99–'02 that a Formula One game has been released on multiple platforms. Sony previously held the rights to F1 and released games only on their own consoles: PlayStation 2, PlayStation Portable and PlayStation 3. The game engine is based on the Ego Engine that Codemasters have used on past racing games Dirt, Race Driver: Grid and Dirt 2. Codemasters released limited bundles of F1 2009 with Formula One-style wheels; the Wii Remote slots into this. In addition to supporting motion-controlled steering and steering wheel peripherals like the standard Wii Wheel, the Wii version also supports analog steering via either the Nunchuk or Classic Controller.

F1 2009 features all the circuits that are on the 2009 calendar including the Marina Bay Street Circuit for night racing and the new Yas Marina Circuit. The game only features the 20 drivers that started the 2009 Formula One season, and does not include the driver changes that were made during the season. There are 15 driver aids each switchable on and off for first time and experienced players, and in the multiplayer version, the level of help changes according to the player's skill, by using a "Fair Play" system. It features slick tyres, as well as the newly introduced KERS concept that functions like a turbo boost, although the game has the feature on all the cars, not just the few that actually used it in the motor racing series. There are several different gameplay modes: Quick Race, where players can choose from a multitude of options, from driver and track to damage and weather, Time Trial, where players compete to set the fastest lap possible by tuning car setups, a two-player split-screen mode on the Wii, and wireless multiplayer option on the PSP for up to four players. The game also offers the choices of playing through a whole Championship season, or taking part in a Grand Prix weekend. It includes the possibility of participating in all the practice sessions, qualifying and the race. A career mode, involving three seasons of the Formula One World Championship, is also included. The game features technical settings for the player to change if desired, including aerodynamics, car balance, gear settings and suspension settings, wheel geometry, tyre compound and pressures, suspension spring rates, individual gear ratios, ride height and wing adjustments. About 70 smaller mini-game style challenges in "Challenge Mode" are also included.

== Promotion ==
In August 2009, Codemasters released the first gameplay footage of F1 2009 showing the Wii version at the Valencia Street Circuit.

As the Formula One calendar visited each track after Valencia, Codemasters released a video showing footage of the track: the Autodromo Nazionale Monza, the Marina Bay Street Circuit, the Suzuka Circuit, the Autódromo José Carlos Pace and the Yas Marina Circuit were all shown, although the race held immediately after Valencia, the Belgian Grand Prix was missed out.

The game features all the drivers and tracks from the 2009 season, but does not represent the replacement drivers that featured in the real F1 season, therefore Luca Badoer, Romain Grosjean, Kamui Kobayashi, Jaime Alguersuari and Vitantonio Liuzzi are not featured, although Giancarlo Fisichella who replaced Luca Badoer (substituting for the injured Felipe Massa) at Ferrari is featured in the Force India team (although he had spent over half of the season driving for Force India anyway).

== Reception ==
Reception

Aggregate scores
Aggregator	Score	
Aggregator	PSP	Wii
GameRankings	70.73%	68.17%
Metacritic	68/100	69/100

Review scores
Publication	Score	
Publication	PSP	Wii
Eurogamer		8/10
GameSpot		6.0/10
GamesRadar+	7/10	7/10
GameZone		5.7/10
IGN	7/10	7.4/10
Official Nintendo Magazine		75%
VideoGamer.com	7/10	7/10

F1 2009 received generally mixed reviews from game critics, for both Wii and PlayStation Portable versions. The graphics of the game were heavily criticised by reviewers: IGN said that the textures were "murky" and the models "half-hearted", while the Official Nintendo Magazine said that "visually it's a dog's dinner". GameZone continued the theme, saying that "the graphics... are super plain and are often ugly", and also commenting that the game "looks like it should have been released for the PSone". GameSpot said that the physics were "not up to scratch", also commenting that the "car will bounce off walls and other vehicles with little regard for what would happen in the real world". The AI was singled out as a failure of the game, with IGN calling it "underwhelming", while Eurogamer said that the computer-controlled cars followed the racing line "too rigidly", commenting that they appear to run into player's car in an attempt to overtake it. The fact that the game contained only the 20 drivers that started the 2009 Formula One season, and did not take into account the driver changes that happened during the season, was another complaint. The sound was also criticised, with GameSpot calling it "uniformly poor".

Critics gave much praise to F1 2009's gameplay and handling, however. GameSpot said that the "cars have a good sense of speed", and IGN commented that the game has "a handling model that's at once accessible, rewarding and – most importantly – fun", while also calling F1 2009 a "driving game" without comparison on the Wii. VideoGamer.com also praised it, saying that the game on Wii captures the feeling of racing in an F1 car superbly, with a sense of speed that even genre rivals on more powerful hardware can't capture it. The Official Nintendo Magazine praised the gameplay as well, saying that the "handling is perfect" and that the game with in-car cockpit view provides immersive racing experience on the Wii. Reviewers also praised the "Challenge Mode" of the game; IGN strongly praised it on the PSP version, stating that "F1 2009 is best played in the Challenge Mode".

Eurogamer commented that the game may not be the revolution the Formula 1 subgenre has been waiting for, but that the Wii owners will not complain to this game either. GameSpot said that F1 2009 is the game for those who want an arcade-style racer with a Formula 1 badge, but will disappoint others who want the essence and challenge of the motorsport. GameZone recommended that customers play the game before they bought it, while IGN said that "for fans of the sport deprived of an F1 game for so many years this does just enough to satiate the thirst". VideoGamer.com looked forward to the game's sequel, F1 2010, to be released on PlayStation 3, Xbox 360 and PC, stating that "there's undoubtedly something better coming next year, on platforms that can do the sport justice". VideoGamer.com summarised the general consensus: "This is a perfectly competent racer, one of the best on the Wii, but it's not a classic by any stretch of the imagination".
