= F1 2000 (disambiguation) =

F1 2000 may refer to:

- The 2000 Formula One season, the 51st FIA Formula One World Championship season
- F1 2000 (video game), a video game by EA based on the above F1 season released as part of the EA Sports F1 Series
- Formula One 2000 (video game), a video game by Psygnosis, based on the above F1 season
- F1 Championship Season 2000, a video game by EA Sports, based on the above F1 season
