= F1 (video game series) =

Racing video game series

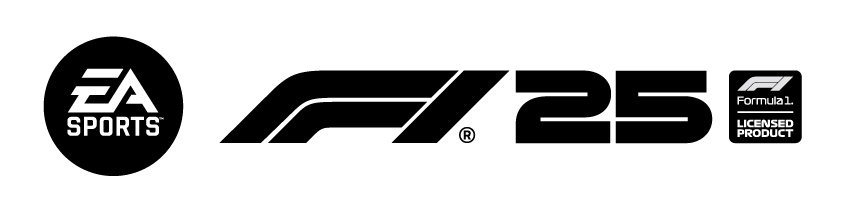
- the latest logo of the series, F1 25, by EA Sports
- Genre: Racing
- Developers: Codemasters; EA Redwood Shores; EA UK; Feral Interactive; Image Space Incorporated; Intelligent Games; Sumo Digital; Tiertex Design Studios; Visual Science
- Publishers: EA Sports; Codemasters
- Platforms: Android; GameCube; Game Boy Advance; iOS; Linux; Macintosh operating systems; macOS; Microsoft Windows; PlayStation; PlayStation 2; PlayStation 3; PlayStation 4; PlayStation 5; PlayStation Portable; PlayStation Vita; Stadia; tvOS; Wii; Wii U; Nintendo 3DS; Xbox; Xbox 360; Xbox One; Xbox Series X and Series S
- First release: F1 2000; 29 February 2000
- Latest release: F1 25; 30 May 2025

F1 is a racing video game series by Codemasters under the EA Sports banner since 2021. The series holds the official license of the FIA Formula One World Championship, with the FIA Formula 2 Championship available since the 2019 game. A total of twenty-three games have been released to date, with the series' latest installment, F1 25, released in May 2025.

== Release history ==
Electronic Arts' EA Sports division started the series with F1 2000. Six games have been released between 2000 and 2003, when Image Space Incorporated and Visual Science took charge of the PC and the console versions respectively. Intelligent Games was also involved to produce F1 Manager for Microsoft Windows in 2000.

In May 2008, Codemasters acquired the license after the end of Sony's own Formula One video game series, developing the Ego engine. They released each game in the series at an annual pace, with the first game being available on Wii, PlayStation Portable and iOS in 2009. Feral Interactive and Sumo Digital were once responsible for platform transplantation. Subsequent sequels were released on contemporary Sony and Microsoft consoles and computers. Following the acquisition by Electronic Arts in 2021, F1 2019 and F1 2020 were made available on EA Play.

Since EA acquired Codemasters in 2021, EA has recovered rights for the F1 title again, with EA Sports returning to publish the series' new installment, F1 2021. The game was released that July and was the first game in the series available for the ninth generation of video game consoles.

Since F1 2019, Formula 2 has been represented in the series. On launch, the previous year's lineup is presented, with a post-launch update adding the current season.

== Games ==
Aggregate review scores As of 20 June 2025.
Game	Year	Metacritic
F1 2000	2000	N/A
F1 Championship Season 2000	2000	PC: 71/100; PS: 66/100; PS2: 70/100
F1 Manager	2000	N/A
F1 2001	2001	PC: 79/100; PS2: 83/100; XBOX: 83/100
F1 2002	2002	GC: 71/100; PC: 81/100; PS2: 81/100
F1 Career Challenge	2003	PS2: 70/100
F1 2009	2009	PSP: 68/100; Wii: 69/100
F1 2010	2010	PC: 84/100; PS3: 84/100; X360: 84/100
F1 2011	2011	3DS: 59/100; PC: 83/100; PS3: 82/100; PSV: 66/100; X360: 84/100
F1 2012	2012	PC: 80/100; PS3: 81/100; X360: 84/100
F1 Race Stars	2012	PC: 62/100; PS3: 61/100; WiiU: 61/100; X360: 64/100
F1 2013	2013	PC: 77/100; PS3: 77/100; X360: 79/100
F1 2014	2014	PC: 61/100; PS3: 62/100; X360: 64/100
F1 2015	2015	PC: 61/100; PS4: 65/100; XONE: 64/100
F1 2016	2016	iOS: 66/100; PC: 86/100; PS4: 82/100; XONE: 85/100
F1 2017	2017	PC: 89/100; PS4: 86/100; XONE: 84/100
F1 2018	2018	PC: 83/100; PS4: 84/100; XONE: 84/100
F1 2019	2019	PC: 87/100; PS4: 84/100; XONE: 89/100
F1 2020	2020	PC: 88/100; PS4: 86/100; XONE: 91/100
F1 2021	2021	PC: 86/100; PS4: 83/100; PS5: 84/100; XONE: 88/100; XSXS: 88/100
F1 22	2022	PC: 82/100; PS5: 82/100; XSXS: 81/100
F1 23	2023	PC: 80/100; PS5: 83/100; XSXS: 83/100
F1 24	2024	PC: 72/100; PS5: 78/100; XSXS: 75/100
F1 25	2025	PC: 79/100; PS5: 80/100; XSXS: 82/100

=== EA Sports' out-house era (2000–2003) ===
==== F1 2000 (2000) ====
The first video game of the series was developed by Visual Science for the PlayStation and Image Space Incorporated for Microsoft Windows. The game was released on 29 February 2000.

==== F1 Championship Season 2000 (2000) ====
A second video game based on the 2000 Formula One World Championship was initially released by EA Sports for PlayStation, Microsoft Windows, PlayStation 2 and Game Boy Color on 28 September 2000.

==== F1 Manager (2000) ====
A spin-off game developed by Intelligent Games was available for Microsoft Windows on 6 October 2000. The game features ten-year managing simulation within a Formula One team.

==== F1 2001 (2001) ====
F1 2001 holds the official license of the 2001 Formula One World Championship. It was released for Microsoft Windows, PlayStation 2 and Xbox platforms.

==== F1 2002 (2002) ====
A fifth game of the series, titled F1 2002, was released for Xbox, Microsoft Windows, PlayStation 2, GameCube and Game Boy Advance.

==== F1 Career Challenge (2003) ====
The last video game in the series developed by Visual Science, titled as F1 Career Challenge or F1 Challenge '99–'02, was available for GameCube, Microsoft Windows, PlayStation 2, Xbox in June 2003. The game features four Formula One seasons between 1999 and 2002.

=== Codemasters' independent era (2009–2020) ===
==== F1 2009 (2009) ====
F1 2009, the first video game by Codemasters, was announced in May 2008 after Codemasters secured the official Formula One video game licence. The game was developed by Sumo Digital and based on the 2009 Formula One World Championship season. It was released on 16 November 2009 for Wii and PlayStation Portable platforms.

==== F1 2010 (2010) ====
F1 2010 was based on the 2010 season of the Formula One World Championship. The game was released to three new platforms, Microsoft Windows, PlayStation 3 and Xbox 360 on 22 September 2010.

==== F1 2011 (2011) ====
Based on the 2011 Formula One World Championship, F1 2011 was released on 20 September 2011 as the third game of the franchise. In addition to the platforms on which F1 2010 launched, the game was also available on Nintendo 3DS and PlayStation Vita.

==== F1 2012 (2012) ====
A fourth game by Codemasters, based on 2012 season, was released for Microsoft Windows, PlayStation 3 and Xbox 360 on 21 September 2012. A Mac OS X version ported by Feral Interactive was released on 20 December of the same year.

==== F1 Race Stars (2012) ====
A spin-off kart racing game, titled F1 Race Stars, was initially released on 13 November 2012. It was loosely based on the 2012 Formula One World Championship, featuring loops, jumps and short-cuts in several redesigned Formula One circuits. The game was ported to the Wii U platform under the title F1 Race Stars: Powered Up Edition, where it was released on 16 January 2014.

==== F1 2013 (2013) ====
F1 2013 was the sixth video game by Codemasters based on the Formula One World Championship that was developed by Codemasters. It was initially released on 4 October 2013 for Microsoft Windows, PlayStation 3 and Xbox 360, with a Mac OS X version by Feral Interactive to follow in early 2014.

==== F1 2014 (2014) ====
F1 2014 featured new hybrid-powered cars introduced in the 2014 season. It was the last game in the series released for seventh generation of video game consoles Xbox 360 and PlayStation 3.

==== F1 2015 (2015) ====
F1 2015 was the first game of the franchise that was available for the eighth generation of video game consoles PlayStation 4 and Xbox One. It was released on 10 July 2015 and based on the 2015 Formula One World Championship, with the 2014 season as bonus content.

==== F1 2016 (2016) ====
F1 2016 was the ninth video game by Codemasters that carried on the Formula One title. It was released on 19 August 2016 for Microsoft Windows, PlayStation 4 and Xbox One. It featured all drivers and teams of the 2016 Formula One World Championship. The game received four more platforms, macOS, iOS, Android and tvOS.

==== F1 2017 (2017) ====
F1 2017 was the tenth video game of the series by Codemasters and is based on the 2017 Formula One World Championship. It was released for Microsoft Windows, PlayStation 4 and Xbox One on 25 August 2017. Following the foundation of the Formula One eSports Series, the game was used in its debut season. The game also features several classic cars.

==== F1 2018 (2018) ====
F1 2018 was the eleventh official video game of the FIA Formula One World Championship, and the eleventh of the franchise by Codemasters. It was released for Microsoft Windows, PlayStation 4 and Xbox One on 24 August 2018. In addition to the cars that were competed in the 2018 Formula One World Championship, the game also includes various classic Formula One cars.

==== F1 2019 (2019) ====
In addition to the 2019 Formula One World Championship, F1 2019 also holds the official licence of the 2019 FIA Formula 2 Championship, with the 2018 season available from launch. Like its predecessor F1 2018, the game also contains a number of classic cars. The game also features a DLC that focused on the Prost–Senna rivalry.

==== F1 2020 (2020) ====
F1 2020 was the official video game of the 2020 Formula 1 and Formula 2 Championships (2019 season from launch with 2020 season being added in an update). The game allowed players to create their own team, as well as following its trend of adding extra classic cars to the series. It featured the championship as it had originally been intended to be run. (Note: The 2020 championship was disrupted by the COVID-19 pandemic, which saw several Grands Prix postponed or cancelled, with races at other circuits held.) The game was released on 10 July 2020 for Microsoft Windows, PlayStation 4, Xbox One and Stadia.

=== EA's return (2021–present) ===
==== F1 2021 (2021) ====
F1 2021 was the official game of the 2021 Formula One and Formula 2 Championships. The game featured a story mode and new circuits including Imola, Portimão and the calendar newcomer Jeddah. The classic cars have been removed from this iteration of the game. It was released for Microsoft Windows, PlayStation 4, PlayStation 5, Xbox One and Xbox Series X/S on 16 July 2021, with EA Sports publishing the game for the first time since F1 Career Challenge in 2003.

==== F1 22 (2022) ====
F1 22 was the official game of the 2022 Formula One and Formula 2 championships. The game featured a series of track updates and new car models following the introduction of the new regulations. The game was released on 1 July 2022 for Microsoft Windows, PlayStation 4, PlayStation 5, Xbox One and Xbox Series X/S.

==== F1 23 (2023) ====
F1 23 was the official game of the 2023 Formula One World Championship. The game was released on 16 June 2023 for Microsoft Windows, PlayStation 4, PlayStation 5, Xbox One and Xbox Series X/S.

==== F1 24 (2024) ====
F1 24 was the official game of the 2024 Formula One World Championship. It featured a revamped career mode and handling system. The game was released on 31 May 2024 for Microsoft Windows, PlayStation 4, PlayStation 5, Xbox One, Xbox Series X and Xbox Series S. It is the last game to be released on an eighth-generation console.

==== F1 25 (2025) ====
F1 25 was the official game of the 2025 Formula One World Championship, which held the licence for both the Formula One and Formula 2 World Championships. The Braking Point story mode returned after its inclusion in F1 2021 and F1 23. The game was released on Microsoft Windows, PlayStation 5, and Xbox Series X/S on 30 May, with the 'Iconic Edition' granting early access on 27 May.

On 18 November 2025, EA Sports announced that instead of releasing a full-price F1 26, the impending 2026 season would arrive as a paid expansion to F1 25 instead, making it the first title since F1 2015 to depict more than one season. The plan is for the franchise to return in 2027 with the next full release.
