= EA Sports F1 2001 =

2001 video game

F1 2001
- Developers: Image Space Incorporated (PC); EA UK (PS2 & Xbox)
- Publisher: EA Sports
- Series: F1
- Platforms: Microsoft Windows, PlayStation 2, Xbox
- Release: Microsoft Windows & PlayStation 2: NA: 2 October 2001; EU: 5 October 2001; Xbox: NA: 19 November 2001
- Genre: Racing
- Modes: Single-player, multiplayer

F1 2001 is a racing video game developed by Image Space Incorporated for the Microsoft Windows version and EA UK for the PlayStation 2 and Xbox version and published by EA Sports for Microsoft Windows, PlayStation 2 and Xbox. It is based on the 2001 Formula One season. A port for GameCube was planned, but cancelled for unknown reasons, and eventually released with minor changes as F1 2002. A Game Boy Color version was also cancelled during development.

The gameplay focuses on a new training mode which allows players to improve their skills and eventually be able to unlock new modes as the progress of training is made.

F1 2001 was well received by critics and received a nomination from GameSpot for their Driving Game of the Year.

== Gameplay ==
Gameplay of the Xbox Version

The game features the 17 tracks and a select choice of 22 drivers who competed in the 2001 season. The modes feature the quick race format where the player gains points to access the 17 Tracks. The premiere mode of the game is called "Grand Prix" which includes five distinct modes of gameplay including: a full championship season with all the 17 rounds of the 2001 season that includes the Practice and Qualifying sessions along with the Race itself, a single race weekend, a custom championship where the player chooses how many rounds he/she chooses to compete, a teammate challenge where the player must defeat every teammate in all the 11 teams, and a domination mode where the player must win every round of the championship without conceding defeat.

For the first time in a Formula One game, there is a training mode where players may hone their skills on the track. Such training includes: practice race starts, driving the car with manual gears, learning how to drive in changeable conditions such as rain, the handling of various types of corners such as a Chicane, how to deal with various types of damage sustained to the car and practice pit stops for the player to find out the time it takes to get into the pit lane to take on fuel and new tires before returning to the circuit. This game is unique as the more challenges are completed, the more game modes are unlocked in Grand Prix mode. This format is similar to the license tests in Gran Turismo 3: A-Spec.

Other features in the game are Team Radio, which helps the player with feedback from the driver's race engineer, a replay mode, which allows anyone to go back and view key moments within a limited amount of time, the inclusion of the official FIA rules and regulations, and the ability of all the cars to be fine-tuned as in previous games such as F1 2000.

== Development ==
The developers had collaborated with insiders who worked for BAR to help capture the essence of real life Formula One racing who provided real-life motion captures, a feedback from key members of the race teams which became part of the game. The executive producer for the game John Rostron said that "they wanted to stretch the boundaries of motor sports gaming and shake up the racing genre all together". The game utilizes the same engine used in F1 Championship Season 2000. The developers made alterations to the physics model of the cars to make the cars to make them react better to minor collisions and changes in the track surface. For track modelling, the reflections from buildings situated around the circuits were designed to be more realistic. The shadow code was rewritten allowing increased contrast to the shadows of objects. A new dynamic shadow system was added to move the location of a shadow which was dependent on the sun's position for weather changes. One major problem discovered upon release was that the graphics on the PC version would become distorted if newer computer drivers were used, thus rendering the game unplayable. EA Sports released a patch to combat the graphics issue along with fixes in compatibility in video cards. A port was planned for the Game Boy Color but was cancelled before release.

=== Promotion ===
Between 16 and 19 July 2001, EA held an event at the Autodromo Nazionale Monza race track that saw Ricardo Zonta race against the game's producers. On 25 July another event called Camp EA 2001 held at Redwood Shores featured all of the latest games including F1 2001 on display. IGN viewed a demo of the game at the event and praised the game for its smooth quality and fun playing style which was down to some of the developers who had worked on Quake III Arena. As a sign of good faith, BAR carried the EA Sports logo on their cars at the 2001 United States Grand Prix and 2001 Japanese Grand Prix. The Xbox version debuted at a pre-ECTS event in September 2001.

== Teams and drivers ==
All teams and drivers are based on the 2001 Formula One season teams and drivers lineup. Pedro de la Rosa is featured in this game, but was not featured in the PS1 and European PS2 versions of Formula One 2001 and F1 Career Challenge for the 2001 season mode.

== Soundtrack ==
The game included the songs Sunstroke, The Drive Home and a remix of Nagasaki Badger by Chicane which are played on the main menu screens.

== Reception ==
Reception

Aggregate score
| Aggregator | Score | | |
| Aggregator | PC | PS2 | Xbox |
|---|---|---|---|
| Metacritic | 79/100 | 83/100 | 83/100 |

Review scores
| Publication | Score | | |
| Publication | PC | PS2 | Xbox |
|---|---|---|---|
| AllGame | 4/5 | N/A | N/A |
| Computer Gaming World | 3.5/5 | N/A | N/A |
| Electronic Gaming Monthly | N/A | N/A | 8.5/10 |
| Famitsu | N/A | 28/40 | N/A |
| Game Informer | N/A | N/A | 7.75/10 |
| GameRevolution | N/A | B | B |
| GameSpot | 8/10 | 8/10 | 8.2/10 |
| GameZone | 8.5/10 | 8.2/10 | N/A |
| IGN | 7.9/10 | 7.8/10 | 8.5/10 |
| Official U.S. PlayStation Magazine | N/A | 5/5 | N/A |
| Official Xbox Magazine (US) | N/A | N/A | 8.7/10 |
| PC Gamer (US) | 88% | N/A | N/A |

The game received "favourable" reviews on all platforms according to the review aggregation website Metacritic. In Japan, where the PlayStation 2 version was ported for release on 20 September 2001, Famitsu gave it a score of 28 out of 40.

Peer Schneieder of IGN called the Xbox version "a barely enhanced but still enjoyable Formula One racing experience". Ralph Edwards noted in the PS2 review that Formula One games were a "hard sell in the United States" but praised Electronic Arts commitment to appeal to Formula One enthusiasts. GameSpot nominated the game as one of its nominees for Driving Game of the Year for 2001. Olivier Panis tested the game at the 2001 Japanese Grand Prix and commented that the game was close to real life Formula One Racing. In May 2012, the game along with the rest of the EA F1 series was rated the 4th greatest Formula One gaming series by readers of the website RaceFans winning 8% of the vote.
