= Formula One 2001 =

Formula One 2001 may refer to:

- the 2001 season of the Formula One championship,
- F1 2001, a video game developed by EA Sports / Electronic Arts,
- Formula One 2001, a video game developed by Studio 33 and Sony Studio Liverpool.
