= F-1 (arcade game) =

1976 electro-mechanical arcade game

- Japanese promotional sales flyer
- Developer: Nakamura Manufacturing Company (Namco)
- Publishers: JP: Nakamura Manufacturing Company; NA: Atari, Inc.
- Designer: Sho Osugi
- Platform: Arcade
- Release: JP: October 1976; NA: November 1976
- Genre: Racing
- Mode: Single-player

F-1 is a 1976 electro-mechanical arcade racing game developed and published by Nakamura Manufacturing Company (Namco), and distributed in North America by Atari, Inc. The player uses a steering wheel to control a Formula One racer, which must avoid collision with other vehicles. The game uses a miniature diorama with small, plastic cars to represent the player's car and opponents on a physical, rotating track, while also featuring a projector system and lighting tricks to create the illusion of racing.

The game was designed by company engineer Sho Osugi, who worked on many of the company's earlier driving-themed electro-mechanical games, and was made to be a smaller version of his earlier game Formula-X that could easily be placed into smaller stores and entertainment centers. The 1968 electro-mechanical driving game Indy 500 by Kansai Seiki Seisakusho (Kasco) is also believed to be a source of inspiration for the game, likely due to Namco's strong business relationship with Kansai prior to development.

F-1 was widely successful upon release, being praised for its sense of thrill, responsive controls and attractive cabinet design. It is cited as the first game based on Formula One racing and one of Namco's first major arcade hits. It was the highest-grossing arcade game in Japan for two years in a row, in 1976 and 1977, and the highest-grossing electro-mechanical arcade game of 1977 in the United States. It was followed by a sequel, F-1 Mach (1977). A cabinet appears in the film Dawn of the Dead (1978). F-1 later provided the basis for Namco's hit racing video game Pole Position (1982), which was co-designed by Sho Osugi.

== Gameplay ==
F-1 is an electro-mechanical arcade driving game, but resembles an arcade driving video game. The player steers a car around a race track, trying to avoid all cars. The gameplay is viewed from the perspective of the driver's viewpoint, which is displayed on the screen using a projector system.

The player sits in a cockpit-like arcade cabinet, in front of a large projection screen. It projects realistic color visuals, including the front of the player's car, a roughly circular track, and two competing racing cars, and generates sound effects. When the player collides with another car, the game triggers a crash sequence, where an array of fire and smoke burst onto the screen.

== Development and release ==
F-1 was designed by engineer Sho Osugi of the Nakamura Manufacturing Company, who worked on many of the company's earlier driving-themed electro-mechanical arcade games. The game is based on Osugi's previous racing games Racer (1973) and Formula-X (1975), the latter of which was only found in areas such as bowling alleys due to its massive cabinet size — this led to him producing a smaller version that could be fitted more easily into smaller stores and other entertainment centers. This smaller version was also made to be a drastic improvement over the original, featuring more realistic lighting effects and a more effective projector system. The 1968 driving game Indy 500 by Kansai Seiki Seisakusho (Kasco) is also believed to have been a possible source of inspiration for the game, due to Nakamura Manufacturing's strong business relationship with them. F-1 was released by Nakamura Manufacturing in October 1976 in Japan under the Namco branding. A month later it was licensed to Atari, Inc. for release in the United States, although Nakamura was credited on promotional material and the cabinet itself.

== Reception ==
F-1 was widely successful upon release, becoming one of Namco's first major arcade hits. In Japan, F-1 was the highest-grossing arcade game for two years in a row according to the annual Game Machine charts, in 1976 and 1977, until it was eventually dethroned by Taito's shoot 'em up video game Space Invaders in 1978. F-1 was the seventh highest-earning arcade game of 1978, and the highest-earning electro-mechanical game that year.

In the United States, it was one of the top two most talked about arcade games at the AMOA 1976 show, and the most talked about driving game at the show (where Atari also demonstrated the driving video games Sprint 2 and Night Driver). Atari national sales manager Frank Ballouz found the game to be the "hottest" arcade game of the year, reacting to its positive response at the AMOA and IAAP tradeshows. F-1 went on to become the 12th highest-grossing arcade game of 1977 according to Play Meter, and the year's highest electro-mechanical game on the list (the top ten were video games). It was later the 16th highest-grossing arcade "video" game of 1979, according to Play Meter.

The December 1976 issue of Play Meter magazine gave F-1 a positive review following its AMOA 1976 demonstration, praising the gameplay, visuals, sound, cabinet, and "frightening" crash sequence. The 25 December 1976 issue of Cash Box magazine praised the game's responsive controls and impressive visual effects, alongside its attractive cabinet design.

== Legacy ==
F-1 has been cited as the first Formula One arcade game. A sequel, F-1 Mach, was released in 1977. It was among Japan's top five highest-earning electro-mechanical arcade games of 1977.

In the 1978 film Dawn of the Dead, one of the characters is playing this game at the mall. Similar scenes involving a character playing the game (and crashing during gameplay) are in the 1981 film Neige and the 1982 film Ladies and Gentlemen, The Fabulous Stains.

A racing video game Pole Position (1982) was later developed by Namco and designed by Sho Osugi based on their experience with producing electro-mechanical driving games in the 1970s, particularly F-1.
