= F1 2013 (video game) =

2013 video game

- PlayStation 3 cover
- Developers: Codemasters Birmingham; Feral Interactive (Mac OS X)
- Publishers: Codemasters; Feral Interactive (Mac OS X)
- Directors: Steven Hood (creative director)
- Composer: Ian Livingstone
- Series: F1
- Engine: EGO Engine
- Platforms: Microsoft Windows; PlayStation 3 Xbox 360; Mac OS X
- Release: Microsoft Windows, PlayStation 3, Xbox 360: PAL: 4 October 2013; NA: 8 October 2013; Mac OS X 6 March 2014
- Genre: Racing
- Modes: Single-player, multiplayer

F1 2013 is a video game developed by Codemasters based on the 2013 Formula One World Championship. It uses the EGO Engine. F1 2013 was released in Europe in 2013 on PlayStation 3, Microsoft Windows, and Xbox 360 on October 4. A digital version was released worldwide on the Steam Store, as well as on 8 October for the PlayStation Store and 15 October for Xbox Games on Demand, with a further release on Mac OS X by Feral Interactive in March 2014. The game was taken down from the stores due to probable license expiration in 2017, whilst the online servers were shut down on 21 March 2024.

Heikki Kovalainen does not appear in the game despite deputising for Kimi Räikkönen at the United States and Abu Dhabi Grand Prix.

== Gameplay ==
The game features all eleven teams and twenty-two drivers competing in the 2013 season, as well as the nineteen circuits and Grands Prix. A "Classic Edition" of the game features additional drivers, cars and circuits from the 1980s and 1990s. The classic cars featured in this game are Williams, Lotus, and Ferrari. The 1990s cars required downloading the 1990s Classic Cars Pack.

Players can also play with the old cars on the new tracks and the new cars on the old tracks and the GUI changes if they change decades. Murray Walker also provides an introductory voice-over for the Classic Edition of the game.

== Circuits ==
The game features the nineteen circuits that were used during the 2013 Formula One season and four "classic" circuits. The additional four tracks are Brands Hatch, England; Estoril, Portugal; Imola, Italy (in 1995 configuration) and Jerez, Spain (in 1985 configuration).

These four circuits were all used together in the 1986 Formula One season; Imola would return as a Grand Prix venue in the 2020 Formula One season, however, the track would not return until F1 2021 featuring the circuit in its modern configuration.

== Development and release ==
The physical version of the game was delayed in the United States and Canada due to logistic issues specific to SKUs for the two territories. An official release date was not announced for the two territories, although a physical copy for store shelves was eventually released. The delay did not affect the availability of the digital version in the United States and Canada, meaning that users could still purchase the game through the Xbox Games Store, PlayStation Store, and via Steam on the original release date.

A "Complete Edition" of the game was released in some territories. It includes the full game as well as all classic content on the disc and is available on PlayStation 3, Xbox 360 and Microsoft Windows.

F1 2013 was made available to download for free on Xbox 360 between 16 and 31 May 2015 as part of the Games With Gold program.

== Reception ==
Reception

Aggregate scores
Aggregator	Score
GameRankings	75.65%
Metacritic	PC: 77/100; PS3: 77/100; X360: 79/100

Review scores
Publication	Score
Destructoid	8/10
Eurogamer	7/10
Game Informer	7.25/10
GameSpot	8/10
GamesRadar+	4.5/5
IGN	8/10
PC Gamer (UK)	82/100
PCGamesN	7/10
Push Square	7/10
The Guardian	4/5

F1 2013 was met with generally positive reviews. F1 Fanatic gave it a 4 out of five saying that "Codemasters have not only given us an enjoyable F1 experience, they have also reaffirmed their commitment to make F1 games that are truly worthy of carrying the famous logo. If F1 2012 felt at times like a half-hearted update, F1 2013 feels like a good step back in the direction where this franchise should be going".

== Sequel ==
F1 2014 was released in October 2014 for Xbox 360, PlayStation 3 and Windows.
