= F1 2015 (video game) =

2015 video game

- Cover art showing (from left to right): Felipe Massa, Daniel Ricciardo, Sebastian Vettel, Lewis Hamilton and Fernando Alonso.
- Developer: Codemasters Birmingham
- Publishers: Codemasters; Feral Interactive (Linux)
- Director: Paul Jeal
- Composer: Mark Knight
- Series: F1
- Engine: EGO Engine 4.0
- Platforms: Microsoft Windows; PlayStation 4; Xbox One; Linux
- Release: Microsoft Windows: WW: 10 July 2015; PlayStation 4, Xbox One: EU: 10 July 2015; NA: 21 July 2015; Linux: WW: 26 May 2016
- Genre: Racing
- Mode: Multiplayer

F1 2015 is a racing game based on the 2015 Formula One season developed by Codemasters. Released in July, it features the team and driver line-ups from the 2015 season, (except Alexander Rossi at Manor Marussia who replaced Roberto Merhi at the final 8 races, except for Russia and Abu Dhabi) including the Autódromo Hermanos Rodríguez. It also features all the drivers, cars and circuits from the 2014 season (i.e. Caterham F1, and the Hockenheimring, which was removed from the calendar). It is the last game from Codemasters branded under the Codemasters Racing label and the first title in the F1 series released for eighth generation consoles.

This is the oldest F1 game to have fully functional online servers, taking the title from F1 2011 which shut down their servers on 21 March 2024, along with the other titles up to the 2014 game. (Note: F1 2010 uses Peer to Peer, keeping their servers up, however, Windows Live was shut down, meaning, along with other factors, F1 2010 it is not fully online.)

== Gameplay ==
Since the F1 series made its debut on PlayStation 4 and Xbox One, the game runs on an all-new version of the EGO game engine, providing a large number of improvements to the game's physics models. It features an all-new "Pro Season" mode that is more challenging than the normal gameplay because there is no HUD and no assist, which includes traction, ABS, and transmission, with the hardest level possible.

The game is also compatible with the PlayStation 4 and Xbox One's voice recognition software, allowing players to talk to their race engineers during the race and ask for race information, weather updates, and tyre status, and even request a change of tyres or wing.

The game was also noted for the fact that the AI would often wreck or make mistakes. This drew both praise and criticism from game critics.

== Development and release ==
Unlike previous Codemasters F1 games, which were released in September–October, F1 2015 was released in July 2015, with the previous title F1 2014 serving as more of a "filler" game until the 2015 title was released. The game was made using a new game engine to dramatically improve both the screen quality and the AI's abilities.

F1 2015 was released worldwide for Microsoft Windows and in Europe for PlayStation 4 and Xbox One on 10 July, followed by a North American console release on 21 July. A version for Linux developed and published by Feral Interactive was released on 26 May 2016.

== Reception ==
Reception

Aggregate scores
Aggregator	Score
GameRankings	(PC) 58.17% (PS4) 65.02% (XONE) 62.22%
Metacritic	(PC) 61/100 (PS4) 65/100 (XONE) 64/100

Review scores
Publication	Score
GameRevolution	2.5/5
GamesMaster	68%
GamesTM	60%
IGN	4.8/10
PlayStation Official Magazine – Australia	70%
PlayStation Official Magazine – UK	70%
PC Gamer (UK)	67%
Play	80%
VideoGamer.com	60%
Metro	3/5

F1 2015 received a mixed reception with the PlayStation 4 version scoring 65 out of 100 on the review aggregator site Metacritic and 65.02% on GameRankings. IGN rated the game a 5.8/10, praising the graphics and control system, but criticizing the severe lack of game modes and overly aggressive AI. Metro liked the weather effects, and said the game held its own in the genre.

The version released for PC received more mixed reception after release, scoring 61 of 100 from critics according to review aggregator Metacritic. Reviews on GameRankings yielded a rating of 58.17%.

The game ascended to number one in the Chart-Track sales chart.

== Censorship ==
- McLaren sponsors have been replaced (via its 2014 season mode); the car's sidepods and rear wing featured the name of the car MP4-29.
- Williams' Martini & Rossi red color has been replaced with blue stripes.
