= F1 Challenge =

1995 video game

- North American cover art
- Developer: Bell Corporation
- Publishers: JP/EU: Sega; NA: Virgin Interactive Entertainment
- Platform: Sega Saturn
- Release: JP: November 2, 1995; EU: February 1996; NA: September 9, 1996
- Genre: Sim racing
- Mode: Single-player

F1 Challenge (F-1 ライブ インフォメーション, F-1 Live Information) is an officially licensed Formula One game developed by Bell Corporation and produced by Sega for the Sega Saturn. The game contains only three of the many Formula One circuits – Hockenheim, Monte Carlo, and Suzuka – while having another three based on the fictional Neo City, containing three different configurations.

While containing a full license (granted by FOCA, not the FIA) of the 1995 Formula One racing season with 12 teams and 24 drivers (not including Simtek, who withdrew midway through the season), the game only allows the player to play as five drivers: Michael Schumacher (Benetton), Damon Hill (Williams), Jean Alesi (Ferrari), Ukyo Katayama (Tyrrell), and Mika Häkkinen (McLaren). The other teams and drivers are in the game and the cars are correctly modeled but are unselectable.

== Gameplay ==
The game is very similar to other titles produced by Sega. Its form is that of an arcade-style simulator that carries a variety of courses that range from easy to hard with a small selection of cars to choose from. This format has been followed by Sega games in the past, with such titles as Virtua Racing (1992), Daytona USA (1994), and Sega Touring Car Championship (1996). Unlike other racing titles released by Sega, F1 Challenge does not rely on powersliding and drifting, and instead attempts to be very simulator-oriented.

During pit stops, players can adjust the front and rear wings, tyres and fuel load, affecting the car's handling, tyre wear and fuel consumption. The game also allows players to watch race replays from different camera angles.

The game supports the Sega Arcade Racer steering wheel peripheral in addition to the standard Saturn controller.

== Development and release ==
F1 Challenge was developed by Bell Corporation and produced by Sega for the Sega Saturn. It was first released in Japan as F-1 Live Information on November 2, 1995. The Japanese version was designed around a television-style presentation of Formula One racing. In addition to its licence from the Formula One Constructors' Association, it was endorsed by Fuji Television, which held Japanese Formula One broadcasting rights. The game featured continuous race commentary by Fuji Television announcer Masaharu Miyake and commentator Jun Imamiya. During races, a picture-in-picture display showed other action occurring around the circuit.

For the Western release, the Japanese commentary was removed and the picture-in-picture display was repurposed as a rear-view mirror. The Western version instead featured an in-race soundtrack; the game's credits list Adam Salkeld and Richard Jacques under "Sega Europe Music".

== Reception ==
Rad Automatic of Sega Saturn Magazine gave the game an 80%, calling it "ideal for race connoisseurs with a perfection complex", but inferior to Sega Rally Championship and Daytona USA as far as the average gamer is concerned. GamePro's The Axe Grinder agreed that it was "More a hardcore racing game than a 'pop' arcade title", and that despite the above-average graphics the game feels bland and unexciting. He also criticized the weak A.I., generic rock soundtrack, and lack of sound effects. A reviewer for Next Generation praised the selection of real-life teams and tracks, but like Rad Automatic he felt it compared unfavorably to Sega Rally Championship and Daytona USA. He scored it three out of five stars. Next Generation gave the four stars out of five for the Saturn version and called it a "truly exceptional" racing game.

Reception in continental Europe was mixed. French magazine Player One awarded the European release 92% in its February 1996 issue. German magazine MAN!AC awarded F1 Challenge 62 out of 100. Reviewer Martin Gaksch praised its controls and considered the game technically solid, but criticised its limited selection of circuits and teams, lack of options and shallow simulation elements, concluding that it compared unfavourably with Sega's Daytona USA and Sega Rally Championship. Spanish magazine Hobby Consolas reviewed the Japanese version, F-1 Live Information, awarding it 79 out of 100. The magazine praised its accessible controls and audio presentation, but criticised the lack of a championship mode and two-player option, and felt that its sense of speed could have been improved.

In Japan, Sega Saturn Magazine awarded the game individual reviewer scores of 7, 8 and 8 out of 10. The reviewers praised its television-style presentation, particularly the continuous commentary and race coverage. However, they expressed reservations about aspects of the driving mechanics, while one reviewer noted the limited selection of real-world circuits. In the magazine's final reader rankings, subsequently compiled in the 2000 book Saturn no Game wa Sekai Ichi!, F-1 Live Information ranked 404th among 945 rated Saturn games, receiving an average reader rating of 7.9663 out of 10.

== Legacy ==
In a 2024 retrospective, racing-game publication Traxion described F1 Challenge as the first officially licensed Formula One game to use 3D graphics, predating Psygnosis's Formula 1 for the PlayStation.
