= F1 2021 (video game) =

2021 video game

- Cover art featuring Red Bull Racing Honda's Max Verstappen, Mercedes-AMG Petronas F1 Team's Lewis Hamilton and Scuderia Ferrari's Charles Leclerc
- Developer: Codemasters
- Publisher: EA Sports
- Composers: Ian Livingstone; Ethan Livingstone; Miktek; Mark Willot; Brian Tyler
- Series: F1
- Engine: EGO Engine 4.0
- Platforms: Microsoft Windows; PlayStation 4; PlayStation 5; Xbox One; Xbox Series X/S
- Release: WW: 16 July 2021 (Note: The Deluxe Edition of the game was released on 13 July 2021.)
- Genre: Racing
- Modes: Single-player, multiplayer

F1 2021 is the official video game of the 2021 Formula One and Formula 2 Championships developed by Codemasters and published by EA Sports. It is the fourteenth title in the F1 series by Codemasters and the first in the series published by Electronic Arts under its EA Sports division since F1 Career Challenge in 2003, after Codemasters was acquired by Electronic Arts just a few months before the trailer was released.

The game was released for Microsoft Windows, PlayStation 4, PlayStation 5, Xbox One and Xbox Series X/S on 16 July 2021. The deluxe edition was launched three days earlier on 13 July.

This is also the most recent game in the series to feature a 4 digit year as the series changed to using 2 digits for the next game as a result of EA's purchase of Codemasters.

== Development and features ==
Codemasters revealed F1 2021 in April 2021, featuring a brand new story mode. New circuits Imola, Portimão, and Jeddah were added in as free updates later. The Marina Bay, Melbourne, Montreal and Suzuka circuits all feature in the game as originally intended, despite the cancellation of these races in real life due to the COVID-19 pandemic. Losail and Istanbul, which were officially involved in real life are not involved in the game. Yas Marina still uses its original layout. The Shanghai circuit also features in the game, as it forms part of the brand new Braking Point mode.

Following FIA rules, the Russian flag was removed as a nationality option, causing Nikita Mazepin to compete under the 'Rest of the World' flag. Robert Kubica doesn't appear in the game having replaced Kimi Räikkönen at the Italian and Dutch Grand Prix.

For the first time in career mode it is now possible for two players to participate in career mode together, either as teammates or rivals.

Seven prominent Formula One drivers are selectable in My Team: Ayrton Senna, Alain Prost, Michael Schumacher, Nico Rosberg, Jenson Button, David Coulthard and Felipe Massa.

The visualization offered by the F1 2021 game has increased from the previous year, based on a more accurate sidetrack of the racing arena and the facial expressions of the characters in story mode. Furthermore, the full version of the opening titles for F1 broadcasts have been added after launching the game following the EA Sports and Codemasters logos. PlayStation 5 and Xbox Series X/S, and on PC, ray tracing support, as well as victory radio calls, also make its debut in the F1 game.

Players can also form their own F1 team through the My Team feature within Career Mode. Through this feature, players will deal with the selection of sponsors and suppliers of car engines as well as the process of recruiting teammates. A new feature to this mode for 2021 was the addition of Department Events, where the player is given a scenario affecting the team and has to pick what, in their opinion, is the best decision.

== Story Mode: Braking Point ==
The game introduces the story mode Braking Point, set across three years (the end of the 2019 Formula 2 season, then the 2020 and 2021 Formula One seasons). According to a statement by Codemasters, Braking Point "immerses players into the glamorous world of Formula One, giving a taste of the lifestyle both on and off the track: the rivalries, emotion and dedication needed to compete at the highest level".

With the addition of Braking Point, the F1 series became the fourth EA Sports title to have a story mode following Fight Night Champion's Champion Mode, FIFA's The Journey, and Madden NFL's Longshot. There are five selectable teams in the mode: Racing Point (later Aston Martin), Scuderia AlphaTauri, Alfa Romeo Racing (canon path as of F1 23), Haas and Williams.

The protagonist of the story is Aiden Jackson (voiced by Aiden Felgate), a British rising star ascending through the junior categories with accolades in the hopes of one day reaching Formula 1 and eventually becoming world champion. The story begins at the season finale of the 2019 FIA Formula 2 championship, where an intense title battle between Jackson in the Carlin and ART's Nyck De Vries has gone down the wire in the final sprint race of the year. Jackson is crowned 2019 Formula 2 champion after making a late-game surge passing the DAMS of Nicholas Latifi and Virtuosi of Luca Ghiotto in the dying laps to win the Sprint whilst title rival De Vries struggles with tyre and car balance. After winning the title, Jackson graduates to Formula One for the 2020 season with a lot of pressure, weight and expectations placed upon him from having such a stellar junior career. Whilst he does put up a good front for the cameras, off the track he has a hard time making the transition to Formula One, competing against the best drivers in the world. In the intro to the story, the 2020 season portion of the story, and the final part of the final chapter, the player assumes the role of Jackson.

Also in the story mode is Dutch driver Casper Akkerman (voiced by Christopher Dane), who serves as Jackson's teammate. As a veteran Formula One driver (sharing some of his characteristics and traits with Kimi Räikkönen), he is more mature and experienced than Jackson. With a wave of a new generation of drivers bursting onto the Formula One scene, Akkerman is struggling to stay competitive in the twilight of his racing career. He is married to Zoe (voiced by Kerry Bennett), with whom he has a daughter named Lily (Zoe is the only one in Casper's family aside from himself who physically appears; his daughter Lily can be seen in a picture frame to the left of his laptop). Zoe is aware of the sacrifices her husband makes to stay competitive in Formula One. For most of the 2021 season portion of the story, the focus switches to Akkerman.

Devon Butler (voiced by Adam Sanderson), who previously appeared in the driver career mode of F1 2019 as the main rival in the F2 scenario and, canonically, the champion of the 2018 F2 season in that scenario, returns as Jackson's rival. Lukas Weber, also from F1 2019, makes an off-screen appearance via e-mail, in which he surprisingly says his favourite film in the Cars franchise is the second film (where Lewis Hamilton also appeared). Butler retains his F1 2019 race number 71, while Akkerman and Jackson use 54 and 89 respectively (the latter of which was coincidentally also used by Jack Aitken during his stint for Williams at the 2020 Sakhir Grand Prix).

Whichever team the player chooses, the character Brian Doyle (voiced by Jerry Anderson) appears as a direct liaison to the team principal.

=== Plot ===
After winning the 2019 Formula 2 Championship with Carlin, Aiden Jackson secures a drive with a Formula One team for the 2020 season. However, Jackson has a rocky start to his Formula One career as he makes contact with teammate Casper Akkerman in the season opener in Australia. (Note: The real-life 2020 Australian Grand Prix, 2020 Chinese Grand Prix and 2020 Mexico City Grand Prix were not held respectively as they was cancelled due to the COVID-19 pandemic.) Jackson refuses to admit that the contact was his fault, angering Akkerman. Little did the two know that rival driver Devon Butler had indirectly caused that incident by making it three-wide in a turn. To add insult to injury, Butler himself stirs up tensions between Jackson and Akkerman, which start to mount during the Chinese Grand Prix, where Akkerman forces Jackson off the track upon overtaking him.

Going into the mid-season, the team finds itself struggling in the Constructors' Championship as Jackson is still unable to get along with Akkerman. Their relationship continues to worsen when Akkerman finds out that Jackson has been given the updated power unit instead of him. The team heads to Mexico with the hope of scoring points to secure their place above the rest of the midfield teams, but their hopes are shattered when Jackson and Akkerman, unwilling to give up positions, collide and take each other out. (Note: Based on Lewis Hamilton and Nico Rosberg incident in 2016 Spanish Grand Prix.) After the race, Brian Doyle sternly reprimands the two, threatening to sack them both if they cause trouble with each other any further.

The tensions carry over to the 2021 season. Akkerman is frustrated, feeling that the team seems to have started treating Jackson as the number one driver as he gets priorities on both qualifying and pit strategy. At the Canadian Grand Prix, (Note: The real-life 2021 Canadian Grand Prix was not held due the COVID-19 pandemic.) Akkerman refuses to let Jackson pass despite being told to do so. Right after the race, both Jackson and Akkerman have a heated argument in the paddock, during which Akkerman inadvertently declares his retirement to Jackson, although Akkerman later clarifies that he had already planned to retire at the start of the season and that the retirement has nothing to do with the incident as Jackson seemed to believe. The altercation goes viral on social media via a video, apparently recorded by Butler on his phone. As a result, Jackson loses a good chunk of his fans, who blame him for Akkerman's retirement.

Akkerman's strong performances keep the team in the fight, but the tensions between him and Jackson still do not show any signs of resolution. At the team dinner, Doyle brings the two together to discuss their problems. They finally find out that their mutual hostility was actually fueled by false rumours and gossip spread by Devon Butler. Akkerman reveals to Jackson that he had blindly believed Butler's lies all along, leading him to throw a fit for his gullibility. With their differences sorted and their feud put behind them, Akkerman and Jackson work together to beat Butler's team and get their team to fourth in the Constructors' Championship.

At the final race in Abu Dhabi, Butler's teammate retires from the race due to mechanical issues. Taking advantage of this, Akkerman leads Butler into the final part of the race. While attempting an overtake, Butler collides with Akkerman, resulting in both sustaining major damage to their cars. Butler is out of the race, while Akkerman is still able to continue and gives up his position to Jackson, passing on a radio message telling him to finish the race on the podium. Jackson is eventually able to make it into third place. After the race, Jackson and Akkerman celebrate together at the podium ceremony.

In a post-credits in-game message, Jackson begins his negotiation to race for one of the big teams (Mercedes, Red Bull Racing, or Ferrari) while also receiving a good luck message from Zoe Akkerman.

== Reception ==
Reception

Aggregate score
Aggregator	Score
Metacritic	PC: 86/100; PS4: 83/100; PS5: 84/100; XSX: 88/100

Review scores
Publication	Score
Eurogamer	Recommended
IGN	8/10
PC Gamer (UK)	91/100
PCGamesN	8/10
Push Square	8/10

F1 2021 received "generally favorable" reviews for PC, PlayStation 4, 5, and Xbox Series X, according to the review aggregation website Metacritic. It was praised for its story mode and new handling. The Braking Point story mode was also well received, with praise going to the CGI graphics, characters, voice performances, and plot.

It was nominated for Best Sports/Racing Game at The Game Awards 2021, as well as Racing Game of the Year at the 25th Annual D.I.C.E. Awards.
