= F1 Career Challenge =

2003 video game

- European cover art featuring Williams driver Juan Pablo Montoya
- Developers: Visual Science (GC, PS2, Xbox); Image Space Incorporated (PC)
- Publisher: EA Sports
- Series: F1
- Platforms: GameCube, Microsoft Windows, PlayStation 2, Xbox
- Release: Xbox, Microsoft Windows, & GameCube: AU: June 23, 2003; EU/POL: June 27, 2003; PlayStation 2: NA: June 24, 2003; EU/POL: June 27, 2003
- Genre: Racing
- Modes: Single-player, multiplayer

F1 Career Challenge (F1 Challenge '99-'02 for the Microsoft Windows version) is a racing game based on four Formula One seasons: the 1999 season, the 2000 season, the 2001 season, and the 2002 season. It was the last Formula One video game to be published by EA Sports until F1 2021, when EA purchased Codemasters.

After losing the official Formula One license from Formula One Administration Ltd. to a multi-year exclusive licensing contract between FOA and Sony Computer Entertainment Europe (publishers of the competing Formula One series on PlayStation/PlayStation 2) in late 2002 that became active starting from the 2003 season, barring any developer EA included to make a game centered around these later seasons, the decision was made to produce one final game using the four seasons that EA Sports had previously licensed.

== Background ==
Because of the progressing potential of the game engine, several assets were re-imagined in order to make them more realistic than ever before as well as making the game more adaptable for less powerful personal computers. The car models and associated textures were rebuilt from scratch, whilst the physics engine was significantly improved over prior releases to provide a simulation that was critically lauded. In order to provide a more authentic simulation, every track received minor changes for each season covered, including sponsor boards (barring tobacco and alcohol advertising) as well as external visual changes.

== Errors and mistakes ==
The Indianapolis pit lane entry takes place between turns 12 and 13 (2000-2002).
