= F1 2002 (video game) =

2002 video game

- Developers: Visual Science; Image Space Incorporated (PC)
- Publisher: EA Sports
- Series: F1
- Platforms: Xbox, Microsoft Windows, PlayStation 2, GameCube, Game Boy Advance
- Release: Xbox: JP: April 4, 2002; EU: April 5, 2002; Microsoft Windows & PlayStation 2: JP: June 6, 2002; EU: June 7, 2002; NA: June 11, 2002; GameCube: NA: June 24, 2002; EU: July 19, 2002; Game Boy Advance: EU: December 18, 2002; NA: January 7, 2003
- Genre: Racing
- Modes: Single-player, multiplayer

F1 2002 is a racing video game published by Electronic Arts and released for Xbox, Microsoft Windows, PlayStation 2, GameCube and Game Boy Advance. The game was based on the 2002 season.

Strangely, Hockenheimring and Nürburgring both still use their original layouts, and BMW Williams F1 Team use Compaq logos before being bought by HP. This was rectified in the Microsoft Windows and Game Boy Advance versions.

The GameCube version is a port of F1 2001, with only minor differences.

== Reception ==
GameSpot named F1 2002 a runner-up for its June 2002 "PC Game of the Month" award. It was also a runner-up for GameSpot's annual "Best Driving Game on PC" and "Best Driving Game on GameCube" awards, losing to Rally Trophy and NASCAR: Dirt to Daytona, respectively.
