= Chequered Flag (video game) =

1983 racing video game

- Developer: Psion Software
- Publisher: Sinclair Research
- Designers: Stephen Kelly; Steve Townsend; Cecil Ward
- Platform: ZX Spectrum
- Release: 1983
- Genre: Sim racing
- Mode: Single-player

Chequered Flag is a racing video game developed by Psion Software and published by Sinclair Research in 1983. It was the first driving game published for the ZX Spectrum and one of the first computer car simulators.

== Gameplay ==
Chequered Flag allows a player to select a racing track and one of three cars; two with manual gears and one automatic. Two of the cars are named "Feretti Turbo" and "McFaster Special", in reference to Ferrari and McLaren, who had come first and second in the 1982 Formula One season. The third car is the "Psion Pegasus".

Tracks available include Brands Hatch, Circuit de Monaco, Österreichring, Autodromo Nazionale Monza, Circuit Paul Ricard, Silverstone Circuit and 4 fictitious circuits.

The game is viewed in first-person perspective, from the driver's seat, with each car having a different dashboard layout. With no other cars to race, the aim is to complete laps in the best time possible, avoiding road hazards such as oil and broken glass. The player must also economise fuel and avoid the engine overheating. The game was one of the first to feature pit stops, which would repair damage and take on fuel.

== Reception ==
Reception

Review scores
Publication	Score
Crash	71%
Computer and Video Games	32/40
Home Computing Weekly	5/5
Your Computer	4/5
Personal Computer Games	8/10

On its initial release, Your Spectrum praised the driver's view graphics, with Popular Computing Weekly praising the smooth scrolling. ZX Computing summarised the game as "realistic,... exciting and highly enjoyable".

In 1985, CRASH magazine described the graphics as adequate and the gameplay as good, but felt it was more serious than fun due to the lack of other racers. Sinclair User said it was up to the usual Psion standards, and that the quality and the detail included in the game made it one of the best games for the Spectrum.

In their 1990 retrospective of driving games, Your Sinclair also lamented the lack of other racers, but they praised the realism of the simulation, considering the age of the game. The game reached number one in the UK sales charts, ahead of Manic Miner, and was replaced by Jet Set Willy.
