= F1 2016 (video game) =

2016 video game

- Cover art featuring from left to right: Romain Grosjean, Sergio Pérez, Nico Rosberg, Lewis Hamilton, Sebastian Vettel, Daniel Ricciardo and Max Verstappen.
- Developer: Codemasters Birmingham
- Publisher: Codemasters
- Director: Lee Mather
- Composer: Mark Knight
- Series: F1
- Engine: EGO Engine 4.0
- Platforms: PlayStation 4 Xbox One; Microsoft Windows macOS iOS; Android tvOS
- Release: Windows, Xbox One, PS4; 19 August 2016 iOS, Android; 10 November 2016 macOS; 6 April 2017
- Genre: Racing
- Modes: Single-player, multiplayer

F1 2016 is a racing game which is based on the 2016 Formula One season and was developed by Codemasters Birmingham, published by Codemasters, distributed by Deep Silver in North America and Ubisoft in Japan. The game was released on 19 August for PlayStation 4, Xbox One and Windows. The game was also released for iOS, Android and tvOS on 10 November. A Mac version by Feral Interactive was released on 6 April 2017.

== Features ==
Players are able to play a revised career mode consisting of ten full seasons rather than five seasons in previous games, the longest since F1 2010 where you could play up to 7 seasons. The game includes the twenty-one circuits from the 2016 season and in-game commentary from David Croft and Anthony Davidson. The game also features all eleven teams and twenty-two drivers competing in the championship, including the return of Renault, and the brand-new Haas team. The game uses the Grid from the Spanish Grand Prix, as Daniil Kvyat is at Toro Rosso and Max Verstappen at Red Bull. Esteban Ocon was however not included, as he did not replace Rio Haryanto until the game's pre-release development had ended, while Kvyat and Verstappen swapped before it ended.

Players are able to choose the time of day that a race takes place, customise helmet designs and choose a race number for career mode. The safety car returned, with the mechanics related to it revised, while the Virtual Safety Car was introduced, as well as manual starts, manual pit lane entry and, for the first time in a Codemasters game, the formation lap. The research and development aspect of the game was revised to allow players a greater degree of control over the performance of the car. The teams have a perception of the player, which decreases with bad results and increases with good results. The player will be fired or demoted if the perception goes too low, and will be promoted if the perception goes too high. Online lobbies are expanded to allow for twenty-two car grids.

== Reception ==
Reception

Aggregate score
Aggregator	Score
Metacritic	PS4: 82/100; XONE: 85/100; PC: 86/100 iOS: 66/100

Review scores
Publication	Score
Game Informer	8/10
GameSpot	8/10
IGN	8.8
The Daily Telegraph	4/5
TouchArcade	3/5

The game received a positive reception scoring 86 out of 100 on the review aggregator site Metacritic, with many publications calling it the best Formula One game Codemasters has created.

The game reached number 2 in the UK PS4 sales chart, behind No Man's Sky, but topped the XO chart.

The mobile version, however, has a score of only 66/100 on Metacritic due to AI issues.

== Censorship ==
- Williams' Martini & Rossi red color has been replaced with blue stripes.
