= F1 2012 (video game) =

2012 video game

- Cover art for PC version showing Lewis Hamilton in the foreground and Bruno Senna with Vitaly Petrov in the background
- Developers: Codemasters Birmingham; Feral Interactive (Mac OS X)
- Publishers: Codemasters; Feral Interactive (Mac OS X)
- Directors: Steven Hood (creative director)
- Composer: Ian Livingstone
- Series: F1
- Engine: EGO Engine
- Platforms: Microsoft Windows; Mac OS X PlayStation 3 Xbox 360
- Release: PS3, Xbox 360, Windows: NA: 18 September 2012; AU: 20 September 2012; EU: 21 September 2012; Mac OS X: WW: 20 December 2012
- Genre: Sim racing
- Modes: Single-player, multiplayer

F1 2012 is a video game developed by Codemasters based on the 2012 Formula One season. The game was released in September. It uses the EGO Engine. This was also the first game by Codemasters released under their "Codemasters Racing" label, which was used until 2016.

The Mac OS X version of the game was released by Feral Interactive on 20 December. The online servers for the game were shut down on 21 March 2024.

Jérôme d'Ambrosio, who replaced Romain Grosjean at the Italian Grand Prix, does not appear in the game.

== Features ==
The game features all twelve teams and twenty-four drivers competing in the 2012 season (except for mid-season changes), as well as the twenty circuits and Grands Prix — including the brand new Circuit of the Americas in Austin, Texas — included in the championship.

The game also features a brand-new "Young Driver Test" mode, a tutorial mode designed to introduce new players to the handling characteristics of Formula One cars as a prologue to the career mode. As a demonstration, Codemasters approached several drivers — including Mercedes test driver Sam Bird and GP2 Series driver Stefano Coletti — at the real-life Young Driver Tests (for drivers who have never started a Grand Prix) in Abu Dhabi in November 2011, and asked them to drive the Yas Marina Circuit in F1 2012 instead of using the team simulators they would traditionally use to learn the circuit. All of the drivers who played the game reported that the game was realistic enough for them to learn the circuit to the point where they were confident enough to set competitive lap times.

The game also presents a new main menu, with Codemasters saying it is now easier to navigate around the video game. The sound system has been modified, and players can now hear other cars around them.

=== Gameplay and modes ===
As well as the new young driver test mode, F1 2012 features a new "Champions Mode", in which the six World Champions competing in the 2012 season — Kimi Räikkönen, Lewis Hamilton, Jenson Button, Sebastian Vettel, Fernando Alonso and Michael Schumacher — are styled after traditional end-of-level video gaming bosses, with the player challenged to beat them while racing in conditions that suit each driver.

Another new mode introduced in F1 2012 is the "Season Challenge" mode. Feedback given to Codemasters was that players only played the game when they had a few hours to play. In response, Codemasters brought in this mode so that players could simply play for a short amount of time. In this mode the player will start as a team lower down the field, and over a ten race season the player will move teams mid-season, depending on their ability to beat rival drivers and objectives.

Codemasters also introduced "One-Shot Qualifying", whereby a player has a single lap to qualify for the race. The One-Shot Qualifying is included in Quick Race, Season Challenge and Career Mode. The three stage knock out session is still an option, but the single 20-minute session is no longer available in career mode. There is no longer an option to include all three practice sessions in a race weekend, but instead only a single hour session is available.

In career mode players are no longer able to play races of less than 25% length. In career mode the player can choose a team from the six teams. They are Marussia, HRT, Caterham, Scuderia Toro Rosso, Force India and Williams. The player can join a team after completing the Young Driver Test. The player can choose a team that meets the minimum medal requirements. Players get contract offers from teams as they continues their races in Career Mode.

In the quick play mode the option to make a custom championship is no longer available, but instead the player selects a single race to play on.

== Reception ==
Reception

Aggregate score
Aggregator	Score
Metacritic	PC: 80/100; PS3: 81/100; X360: 84/100

Review scores
Publication	Score
Eurogamer	7/10
Game Informer	7.75/10
GameSpot	8.5/10
GamesRadar+	4.5/5
IGN	9/10
Play	79%
Push Square	7/10
The Guardian	4/5

F1 2012 received generally favorable reviews, earning a collective score of 81 out of 100 from Metacritic. IGN gave the game a 9.0, underlining that while yearly sports releases are faced with the difficult battle of introducing new content when the sport remains relatively unchanged, F1 2012 introduced noticeable tweaks to the gameplay that steadily improved it. GameSpot were equally complimentary (8.5/10), applauding the developer for making the game more approachable to newcomers, but bemoaning the removal of some gameplay modes that had been included in previous releases.
