= F1 Championship Season 2000 =

2000 video game

- Developers: Visual Science (PS); Image Space Incorporated (PC); EA Redwood Shores (PS2); Tiertex Design Studios (GBC)
- Publishers: EA Sports, Feral Interactive (Mac OS X)
- Series: F1
- Platforms: PlayStation, Windows, PlayStation 2, Game Boy Color, Mac OS X
- Release: PlayStation, PlayStation 2, Game Boy Color: EU: 29 September 2000 (PS); EU: 15 December 2000 (PS2); EU: 2000 (GBC); NA: 19 December 2000; Windows: NA: 30 November 2000; EU: 8 December 2000; Mac OS X 25 November 2002
- Genre: Racing
- Modes: Single-player, multiplayer

F1 Championship Season 2000 is a racing video game based on the 2000 Formula One season, and was released by EA Sports for PlayStation, Microsoft Windows, PlayStation 2, Game Boy Color, and Mac OS X.

== Gameplay ==
The game features the 11 teams and 22 drivers which competed in the 2000 season (with the exception of Luciano Burti), a scenario mode, and 17 tracks.

== Reception ==
Reception

Aggregate scores
Aggregator	Score				
Aggregator	GBC	Macintosh	PC	PS	PS2
GameRankings	67%	N/A	80%	75%	67%
Metacritic	N/A	N/A	70/100	66/100	71/100

Review scores
Publication	Score				
Publication	GBC	Macintosh	PC	PS	PS2
CNET Gamecenter	N/A	N/A	8/10	6/10	5/10
Computer Games Strategy Plus	N/A	N/A	4/5	N/A	N/A
Electronic Gaming Monthly	N/A	N/A	N/A	N/A	6.33/10 (Note: Three critics of Electronic Gaming Monthly gave the PlayStation 2 version each a score of 6.5/10, 7/10, and 5.5/10.)
EP Daily	N/A	N/A	N/A	6/10	N/A
Famitsu	N/A	N/A	N/A	N/A	28/40
Game Informer	N/A	N/A	N/A	N/A	7.75/10
GameSpot	6.7/10	N/A	8.6/10	8.4/10	7.5/10
GameSpy	N/A	N/A	75%	N/A	75%
IGN	N/A	N/A	9.2/10	N/A	7.9/10
MacLife	N/A	4/5	N/A	N/A	N/A
Macworld	N/A	3.5/5	N/A	N/A	N/A
Next Generation	N/A	N/A	N/A	N/A	3/5
Official U.S. PlayStation Magazine	N/A	N/A	N/A	3.5/5	2.5/5
PC Gamer (US)	N/A	N/A	90%	N/A	N/A

The PC, PlayStation, and PlayStation 2 versions received "average" reviews according to the review aggregation website Metacritic. Chris Charla of NextGen was generally positive to the latter console version, praising the realistic driving model, detailed car models and damage, and AI, but criticized an assist mode as "poor" and called the graphics and some other visual effects as "unremarkable". In Japan, where said console version was ported for release on 1 March 2001, Famitsu gave it a score of 28 out of 40. Michael Lafferty of GameZone gave the PlayStation version seven out of ten, and considered the title to be more restrictive in its fan-base than other racing games.
