= F1 2011 (video game) =

2011 video game

- European PlayStation 3 box art
- Developers: Codemasters Birmingham; Sumo Digital
- Publisher: Codemasters
- Series: F1
- Engine: EGO Engine
- Platforms: Microsoft Windows; PlayStation 3 Xbox 360; Nintendo 3DS; PlayStation Vita iOS
- Release: PC, PlayStation 3, Xbox 360: NA: 20 September 2011; AU: 22 September 2011; EU: 23 September 2011; Nintendo 3DS: EU: 24 November 2011; AU: 1 December 2011; NA: 6 December 2011; PlayStation Vita: NA: 15 February 2012; EU: 22 February 2012; AU: 23 February 2012
- Genre: Sim racing
- Modes: Single-player, multiplayer

F1 2011 is a video game developed by Codemasters based on the 2011 Formula One season. The game was released in 2011 on Microsoft Windows, the Nintendo 3DS, PlayStation 3, and Xbox 360, with a 2012 release on the PlayStation Vita as a launch title for the system. The game engine is based on EGO 2.0 engine. The online servers for the game were shut down on 21 March 2024.

== Details ==
All twelve teams and twenty-four drivers that started the 2011 season are featured in the game, though mid-season driver changes (Bruno Senna at Lotus-Renault, Pedro de la Rosa at Sauber, Karun Chandhok at Lotus and Daniel Ricciardo at HRT) did not take place due to licensing restrictions. The entire calendar of nineteen circuits from the 2011 season is present, including the new Buddh International Circuit in India. Certain circuits also feature day-to-night transitions.

The focus of F1 2011 is to "Be the Driver, Live the Life, Go Compete" and that multiplayer aspects of the game are being emphasized as a part of this. Online multiplayer has a maximum of sixteen players in a race with the option to include an additional eight AI-controlled cars. Objectives are also included in multiplayer. A split-screen multiplayer mode is implemented, as is an online co-operative championship. The safety car was implemented in the game following its absence in F1 2010, and is available in races that are 20% of real race distance or longer. Red flags are also included for situations where the safety car cannot get around the track, but not for extreme weather conditions. Rule changes for the 2011 season, including KERS, DRS and Pirelli tyres are also featured in the game.

Just like F1 2010, all the drivers are from the initial line-up from the 2011 season. Sub drivers (Bruno Senna, Karun Chandhok, Pedro de la Rosa and Daniel Ricciardo) are not included in the game.

== Features ==
Features of the game include a career mode in which the player makes a driver and simulates the driving experience. Another mode is the Grand Prix in which one picks a professional driver and create a Formula 1 season. There is also a "Proving Grounds" mode in which is a time trial to compete against other players around the world. There is also a multiplayer option in which one can race with other players in a variety of gaming modes.

== Reception ==
Reception

Aggregate score
Aggregator	Score				
Aggregator	3DS	PC	PS Vita	PS3	Xbox 360
Metacritic	59/100	83/100	66/100	82/100	84/100

Review scores
Publication	Score				
Publication	3DS	PC	PS Vita	PS3	Xbox 360
Destructoid	N/A	N/A	4.5/10	N/A	N/A
Eurogamer	6/10	N/A	N/A	N/A	8/10
Famitsu	28/40	N/A	28/40	32/40	32/40
Game Informer	N/A	N/A	N/A	8/10	8/10
GameRevolution	N/A	N/A	N/A	B	B
GameSpot	N/A	8/10	N/A	7.5/10	8/10
GameSpy	N/A	3.5/5	N/A	N/A	N/A
GameTrailers	N/A	N/A	N/A	N/A	8.4/10
IGN	6.5/10	N/A	7/10	8.5/10	8.5/10
Official Nintendo Magazine	81%	N/A	N/A	N/A	N/A
Official Xbox Magazine (UK)	N/A	N/A	N/A	N/A	9/10
PC Gamer (UK)	N/A	88%	N/A	N/A	N/A
PlayStation: The Official Magazine	N/A	N/A	8/10	8/10	N/A
The Daily Telegraph	N/A	N/A	N/A	N/A	4/5
Digital Spy	2/5	N/A	3/5	4/5	N/A

The PC, PlayStation 3 and Xbox 360 versions received "favorable" reviews, while the PlayStation Vita and Nintendo 3DS versions received "mixed or average reviews", according to the review aggregation website Metacritic.

Early critical response was positive, with reviews praised improvements in handling and AI and the way new rule changes - in particular KERS and DRS - added an additional layer of strategy to the game. IGN remarked that the differences in using these features helped separate qualifying and racing into two separate gameplay modes. In Japan, where the game was ported for PlayStation 3, Xbox 360, PlayStation Vita and Nintendo 3DS, Famitsu gave the game a score of one nine, one eight, one seven and one eight for the first two console versions; and one eight, two sevens and one six for the final two handheld versions.

The Guardian gave the Xbox 360 version a score of four stars out of five and said it was "pretty much an essential purchase for any self-respecting petrol-head, and a lot more compelling and enticing than those who don't dream about lap times might imagine". The Daily Telegraph similarly gave the same console version four stars out of five, saying that "Codemasters have made a plethora of improvements under the bonnet, polishing an engine that should prove a fantastic basis for the planned yearly iterations of their F1 franchise". The Digital Fix gave the PlayStation 3 version a score of eight out of ten, calling it "a great racer but only a nearly-great game".

Digital Spy gave said PlayStation 3 version a similar score of four stars out of five, saying that "it's not a wholesale reinvention, but rather a confident leap forward from a publisher in tune with its sport. The career mode lacks a bit of personality, but it's still a good frame for what is most important - the racing". The website also gave the PlayStation Vita version three stars out of five and called it "a laudable attempt at scaling down a sophisticated simulation racer for a handheld platform, but it would have benefited from stronger AI and more challenge. In its defense, it caters well for newcomers due to its casual Challenges mode and forgiving level of difficulty, but still falls marginally short of expectations". However, the same website also gave the Nintendo 3DS version two stars out of five and said that "Sumo Digital should be commended for its attempts to pack as much as humanely possible into a Nintendo 3DS game. Despite its wealth of options, game modes and extras, F1 2011 fails where it counts most, on the race track".

F1 2011 has sold 3.5 million units worldwide.

== See also ==
- 2011 Formula One World Championship
- Ambisonics, the audio technology used in the game
