= F1 2019 (video game) =

2019 video game

- International cover art featuring Scuderia Ferrari's Sebastian Vettel and Mercedes-AMG Petronas Motorsport's Lewis Hamilton
- Developer: Codemasters Birmingham
- Publishers: Codemasters; Deep Silver
- Composers: Miktek; James Kneen; Brian Tyler
- Series: F1
- Engine: EGO Engine 4.0
- Platforms: Microsoft Windows; PlayStation 4; Xbox One
- Release: 28 June 2019
- Genre: Racing
- Modes: Single-player, multiplayer

F1 2019 is the official video game of the 2019 Formula One and Formula 2 Championships developed and published by Codemasters. It is the twelfth title in the Formula One series developed by the studio. The game is the eleventh main series installment of the franchise, and it features all twenty-one circuits, twenty drivers and ten teams present in the 2019 Formula One World Championship. Codemasters said that the game was in development for nearly two years, and described it as "the most ambitious release in the franchise's history". This game is dedicated to British Codemasters audio developer Tony Porter, Austrian 3-time champion Niki Lauda, British long-standing Race Director Charlie Whiting, and French Formula 2 driver Anthoine Hubert.

== Features ==
F1 2019 is the first game in the series to feature driver transfers (similar to EA Sports FIFA and Konami Pro Evolution Soccer), with AI-controlled drivers able to switch teams during or at the end of a championship year. These moves are randomly-generated rather than scripted events.

The game includes 18 Formula 1 cars from F1 2018 from the 1972–2010 seasons, with the DLC having a focus on the careers of Alain Prost and Ayrton Senna. The DLC also includes the 2010 McLaren MP4-25, driven by Lewis Hamilton and Jenson Button, and the 2010 Ferrari F10, driven by Fernando Alonso and Felipe Massa. These cars were included to celebrate the ten-year anniversary of Codemasters releasing the Formula 1 game on the seventh and eighth generations of consoles. Two Ferrari cars, however, are noticeably absent: the 2002 Ferrari F2002 and the 1995 Ferrari 412 T2.

Players are able to design liveries—including fictional sponsors—for a generic 2019 car in multiplayer modes.

Within the game Racing Point's SportPesa sponsorship is replaced by SpScore.com (SportPesa's news and live score website) due to SportPesa being a betting company and the game being PEGI 3 rated, as well as regulations on gambling advertising. Scuderia Ferrari's sponsor Mission Winnow was also completely removed because of it being an advertisement for the tobacco company Philip Morris International, as well as A Better Tomorrow branding (run by British American Tobacco) on McLaren cars. In a later update, the 90 Years logos were added, along with the real car, to celebrate Ferrari's 90-year involvement in motorsport.

Codemasters revealed the presence of the FIA Formula 2 Championship in the game, with a Dallara F2 2018 shown at the end of the announcement trailer. The game initially featured the teams, drivers and calendar of the 2018 championship with content based on the 2019 championship added to the game via update in September 2019, including the Anthoine Hubert. The Formula 2 championship is integrated into the game's career mode as a series of three short scenarios designed to introduce driver rivalries, called the F2 Feeder Series. It includes two fictional drivers, Lukas Weber and Devon Butler, who act as teammate and rival to the player character respectively, and they both graduate to Formula 1 alongside the player at the end of the scenario series, with either the player or Butler becoming the champion of the 2018 F2 season (Weber and Butler take numbers 70 and 71 respectively). The full Formula 2 championship can be played separately to the career mode.

== Reception ==
Reception

Aggregate score
Aggregator	Score
Metacritic	PC: 87/100; PS4: 84/100; XONE: 89/100

Review scores
Publication	Score
Game Informer	8.75/10
GameRevolution	4.5/5
GameSpot	9/10
IGN	8.5/10
Jeuxvideo.com	9/10

F1 2019 was well received. Critics praised the inclusion of Formula 2, the game's physical handling, and Career Mode.

GameSpot said that "the Formula 2 cars are superb to handle, and the new additions to career mode, like driver swaps, add some much-needed drama and excitement that real Formula 1 has been missing for some time now". Game Revolution praised the game's content and called the Career Mode a "genuinely thrilling highlight". IGN said that "it definitely doesn't always seem like a new game".

The game got to number 2 in the UK sales chart, behind Crash Team Racing Nitro-Fueled. It reached number 7 in Australia.

F1 2019 and all other previous F1 games were taken off the Steam, PlayStation, and Xbox Stores in April 2022.

=== Awards ===
Year	Award	Category	Result	Ref.
2019	Game Critics Awards	Best Racing Game	Nominated	
2019	The Independent Game Developers' Association Awards	Heritage Award	Nominated	
2019	The Independent Game Developers' Association Awards	Best Racing Game	Won	
2019	Golden Joystick Award	PC Game of the Year	Nominated	
2019	Titanium Awards	Best Sports/Racing Game	Nominated	
2019	The Game Awards 2019	Best Sports/Racing Game	Nominated	
2020	23rd Annual D.I.C.E. Awards	Racing Game of the Year	Nominated	
2020	NAVGTR Awards	Game, Franchise Racing	Nominated	
