= F1 Race Stars =

2012 video game

- Developer: Codemasters Birmingham
- Publisher: Codemasters
- Series: F1
- Engine: EGO Engine 2.0
- Platforms: Microsoft Windows, PlayStation 3, Xbox 360, Wii U
- Release: 13 November 2012: Microsoft Windows, PlayStation 3, Xbox 360; NA: 13 November 2012; AU: 15 November 2012; EU: 16 November 2012 Wii U; Physical disc; JP: 16 January 2014; Nintendo eShop; WW: 16 January 2014
- Genre: Kart racing
- Modes: Single-player, multiplayer

F1 Race Stars is a video game developed by Codemasters, released in November 2012. It is a kart racing game loosely based on the 2012 Formula One season, with circuits redesigned to feature loops, jumps and short-cuts. It is a spin-off from the traditional Formula One video games, and is the first kart-racing game developed by Codemasters. The player is able to choose cartoonish versions of Formula One racing drivers, such as Sebastian Vettel, Lewis Hamilton, Kimi Räikkönen, Nico Rosberg, Mark Webber, Michael Schumacher, Fernando Alonso, and Pedro de la Rosa. Codemasters have described the game as being designed to emphasise entertainment rather than simulation. A Wii U port under the title F1 Race Stars: Powered Up Edition was released in January 2014. The online servers for the game were shut down on 21 March 2024.

== Gameplay ==
All 12 teams and 24 drivers that started the 2012 Formula One season appear as playable characters, along with two additional fictional teams – one, TecNova-Star, with two female drivers, Ruby Power and Jessica Chekker and another, Satsu-Aceler, with male driver Josh Merit and female driver Kira Hoshihara. The Xbox 360 version allows the option to swap the driver's head to the Avatar's head, while the Wii U version allows the option to swap the driver's head to the Mii's head. There are 11 circuits to choose from by default (Belgium, Germany, Italy, Brazil, Abu Dhabi, Monaco, Singapore, Australia, United States, Great Britain and Japan), each based on one of the 20 rounds of the season, but with modifications to suit the gameplay (some parts of the Abu Dhabi GP, for example, are based on the adjacent rollercoaster Formula Rossa in Ferrari World). Additional courses and other content are available as fee-based downloads. Each track contains a KERS system around corners and Item Boxes where players can pick up weapons. Getting hit by weapons damages the player's car, which leads to the driver needing to make a pit stop to maintain top speed.

== Downloadable content ==
Four additional tracks, Europe (Valencia), Canada, China and India have been released.

== Reception ==
Reception

Aggregate score
Aggregator	Score
Metacritic	(PC) 62/100 (PS3) 61/100 (WIIU) 61/100 (X360) 64/100

Review scores
Publication	Score
Eurogamer	6/10
GameRevolution	6/10
GameSpot	5.5/10
GamesRadar+	4/5
Hardcore Gamer	3/5
IGN	5.2/10
Nintendo Life	6/10
Nintendo World Report	6.5/10
Push Square	5/10
VideoGamer.com	7/10

F1 Race Stars received "mixed or average" reviews, according to review aggregator Metacritic.

Eurogamer praised the game's "lavishly produced" tracks, calling the title "enjoyable and solidly made", but criticized the lack of content. IGN wrote that the game was full of visual charm but expressed grievances with the bland power-ups, unfair design, and lack of tracks. GameRevolution wrote that the game failed to be innovative in any notable way but found the presentation charming and the gameplay modes amusing. Push Square noted that the title had a complete disregard for skill, citing the luck-based gameplay as a hindrance that canceled out everything else the game did right. Nintendo Life expressed disappointment with the lack of an online mode and polish in basic areas, stating that the experience was one in which enjoyment outweighed frustration. GameSpot praised the multiplayer and weapons while taking issue with unmemorable track design, aggressive AI, and uncomfortable use of product placement. GamesRadar+ wrote more positively about the game, giving it four stars out of five, finding the track design, handling, and lack of shallow gameplay despite the family-friendly aesthetics to be a positive, while criticizing the weapons.
