= Image Space Incorporated =

American independent video game developer

- Company type: Private
- Industry: Video games
- Founded: 1992
- Headquarters: Ann Arbor, Michigan
- Key people: Joseph Campana; Gjon Camaj; Tim Wheatley
- Products: EA Sports F1; NASCAR Thunder rFactor
- Website: imagespaceinc.com

Image Space Incorporated (ISI) is an American independent video game developer based in Ann Arbor, Michigan, specializing in the fields of video game development, man-in-the-loop simulator architectures, computer image generation, and entertainment systems integration. ISI was originally founded by Kurt Kleinsorge who added partners Joseph Campana and Gjon Camaj. ISI began with the development of vehicle simulators used for military training. They have worked on many different types of software, but focused most of their development time over the years on racing games and simulators. ISI also developed the ISImotor game engine, which is used for creating many racing games like GT Legends, GTR 2 – FIA GT Racing Game, ARCA Sim Racing '08, Race 07, Simulador Turismo Carretera and others. ISI has not released games for any console; Shadowgate Rising was in development, but ultimately cancelled. Sports Car GT for the PlayStation was developed by Point of View, and the original EA F1 games for consoles up until 2002 were made by Visual Science.

== Games developed ==
Title	Release date	Genre	Platform
Zone Raiders	November 30, 1995	Vehicular combat	Windows
Sports Car GT	April 30, 1999	Sim racing	Windows
Trazer	2000	Exergaming	
Shadowgate Rising	Cancelled	Adventure game	Nintendo 64
F1 2000	March 31, 2000	Sim racing	Windows
F1 Championship Season 2000	December 6, 2000	Sim racing	Windows
Hot Rod Monster Squad	2001	Arcade racing	Windows
F1 2001	September 28, 2001	Sim racing	Windows
F1 2002	June 7, 2002	Sim racing	Windows
NASCAR Thunder 2003	September 19, 2002	Sim racing	Windows
F1 Challenge '99-'02	June 24, 2003	Sim racing	Windows
NASCAR Thunder 2004	September 16, 2003	Sim racing	Windows
rFactor	August 31, 2005	Sim racing	Windows
rFactor Pro	2008	Sim racing software	Cross-platform
Superleague Formula 2009: The Game	October 31, 2009	Sim racing	Windows
rFactor 2	January 10, 2012 (open beta release)	Sim racing	Windows
