= Visual Sciences Limited =

British video game developer

- Type: Private
- Industry: Video games
- Founded: 1993; 33 years ago
- Founder: Russell Kay
- Defunct: February 2006
- Fate: Administration
- Headquarters: Dundee, Scotland
- Key people: Russell Kay: MD (1993–2005); CTO (2005–2006); Tim Christian: Non-executive chairman (2003–2005); CEO (2005–2006)
- Owner: Tim Christian (55%; 2005–2006)
- Number of employees: >100 (2006)

Visual Sciences Limited (later branded as Visual Science) was a British video game developer based in Dundee and founded in 1993 by former DMA Design employee Russel Kay. Kay sold a controlling interest in the studio to Tim Christian—who had previously been hired as a non-executive chairman—in January 2005, with Christian becoming its chief executive officer. Following the cancellation of a project by Vivendi Universal Games and Visual Science's subsequent inability to secure further funding, the studio filed for administration and laid off all staff in February 2006.

== History ==
Visual Sciences was established in 1993 by Russell Kay, a former employee of DMA Design and the creator of DMA's 1991 game Lemmings. In January 1999, the company began working closely with Electronic Arts (EA) on what became F1 2000. EA subsequently acquired a 20% stake in Visual Sciences in June 2000, and the studio turned to working exclusively with the publisher.

In 2003, Visual Science hired Tim Christian (a former managing director of MicroProse and Hasbro Interactive) and Andy Campbell (a former managing director of Red Lemon) as non-executive chairman and commercial director, respectively. During Christian's tenure in this role, Visual Science recorded high revenue growth and the addition of large video game publishers to its clients. By July 2004, the company had doubled its staff count to 75 in its Dundee headquarters and Los Angeles satellite office. In January 2005, Christian acquired 55% of the company's shares—a controlling interest—from Kay. Christian became Visual Science's chief executive officer, while Kay assumed the role of chief technical officer.

In January 2006, Vivendi Universal Games cancelled an unannounced project that Visual Science was developing, leaving the latter without funding. Visual Science had just moved into new Dundee offices for which it had not yet signed the lease. Christian informed the company's more than 100 staff not to leave personal belongings in the new building, fearing that the landlord could lock the team out as a result of the project's cancellation. Due to this, some employees believed that they were being laid off and the company shut down, but Christian stated that this was not the case and that Visual Science would be pitching the project to other companies. As Visual Science could not find replacement work for the cancelled project, it filed for administration by early February, laying off all employees. Christian said that he was seeking to use the proceeds generated through the administration process to initiate legal action against Vivendi Universal Games, which he believed had terminated their contract baselessly. Some former Visual Science employees went on to found Cohort Studios in 2006 and release its first game—Buzz! Junior: Dino Den—in February 2008. Other ex-employees founded Proper Games, also in 2006.
