= F1 2000 (video game) =

2000 video game

- North American PlayStation cover art
- Developers: Visual Science (PS); Image Space Incorporated (PC)
- Publisher: EA Sports
- Series: F1
- Platforms: PlayStation, Microsoft Windows
- Release: UK: March 24, 2000; NA: March 27, 2000
- Genre: Racing
- Modes: Single-player, multiplayer

F1 2000 is a racing video game developed by Visual Science for the PlayStation version and Image Space Incorporated for the Microsoft Windows version and published by EA Sports for PlayStation and Microsoft Windows. It is based on the 2000 Formula One season. F1 2000 was the last Visual Science F1 game to appear on the PlayStation. With an official FIA Formula One license, it includes the full 2000 World Championship season, including the new Indianapolis Motor Speedway and the Jaguar Racing team.

== Gameplay ==
The game modes feature a championship, quick races, weekend and time trial modes. In the multiplayer section, the player can either go head-to-head in 2-player split screen sessions, or play a hot-seat time trial mode for up to 22 players.

All cars can be fine-tuned in the pits, and there is clear pit-to-car radio commentary. Full telemetry data is shown for detailed set-up changes. There is also an instant replay mode, including race highlights.

== Reception ==
Reception

Aggregate score
Aggregator	Score	
Aggregator	PC	PS
GameRankings	79%	79%

Review scores
Publication	Score	
Publication	PC	PS
AllGame	N/A	3/5
Computer Games Magazine	4.5/5	N/A
Computer Gaming World	4.5/5	N/A
Edge	N/A	6/10
Electronic Gaming Monthly	N/A	7.5/10
Eurogamer	N/A	8/10
Famitsu	N/A	28/40
GameSpot	8.4/10	6.9/10
GameZone	6.5/10	N/A
IGN	8.1/10	7/10
Official U.S. PlayStation Magazine	N/A	3.5/5
PC Gamer (UK)	58%	N/A

The game received "favorable" reviews on both platforms according to the review aggregation website GameRankings. Stephen Poole, writing for GameSpot, noted the relatively high performance requirements of the PC version, but called it "one of the best F1 racing sims to date". Ryan MacDonald, also of GameSpot, concluded that the PlayStation version was more enjoyable than other F1 games on the platform. Sam Bishop of IGN was more critical of the PlayStation version, citing a lack of in-race music and sluggish controls, and suggested that Formula One 99 was a superior title. In Japan, where the same console version was ported for release on 1 June 2000, Famitsu gave it a score of 28 out of 40.
