= F1 2010 (video game) =

2010 video game

- Cover art
- Developer: Codemasters Birmingham
- Publisher: Codemasters
- Series: F1
- Engine: EGO Engine 1.5
- Platforms: Microsoft Windows; PlayStation 3 Xbox 360 iOS
- Release: Xbox 360, Windows, PS3: NA: 22 September 2010; AU: 22 September 2010; EU: 23 September 2010; UK: 24 September 2010; iOS; 2011
- Genre: Sim racing
- Modes: Single-player, multiplayer

F1 2010 is a video game based on the 2010 season of the Formula One world championship. The game was released in September 2010 on the Microsoft Windows, PlayStation 3 and Xbox 360 platforms, becoming the first F1 game released on the Xbox 360. It has sold 2.3 million units worldwide. The game engine is based on the new EGO 1.5 engine, an unofficially titled evolution of the EGO 1.0 engine that was created specially for the title.

The game includes all 24 drivers from the start of the 2010 season, meaning replacement drivers Nick Heidfeld, Christian Klien and Sakon Yamamoto did not appear in the game.

== Development and features ==
F1 2010 features "the most complicated weather system ever seen in a racing game" which is integral to F1. When it begins to rain, the track will gradually lose grip, with some areas losing grip faster than others. Overhanging trees, for example, will shelter the track, while dips and indentations in the tarmac will hold more standing water and provide a greater risk.

When the rain stops, a "drying line" will start to appear which will provide more grip and will make it easier to drive. If a car strays from the dry line, the tyres will lose grip and it will be harder to drive. Evolving tracks are also featured elsewhere in the game; at the start of a race weekend, the track will be "green" and therefore have less grip, but as the weekend progresses, rubber will be laid down onto the track, increasing the grip.

Research also features in F1 2010, in which players can earn receive new parts, updates and upgrades as they are developed by consistently out-running a teammate. The player's team will develop new parts and updates for their car throughout the season, evolving the car as the season progresses.

The game features a career mode consisting of either three, five or seven seasons (depending on the user's choice). Where players can drive for any team, each have their own objectives. For example, racing for Ferrari and anything other than winning the Driver's and Constructor's Championship would be a failure, while a mere points finish when driving for Lotus would be a huge success. Media interest will also change, depending on whether the player is racing for one of the top teams, or a team at the back of the grid and will reflect the progress the player makes, more success will equal more media attention and more points. Impromptu interviews will take place alongside the official interviews following each race. The developer diaries released by Codemasters have revealed that impromptu interviews are more sensationalist than formal press conferences and that the player may need to be wary of what they say to the media lest they say something they should not and upset their team. Players are forced to retire after the end of the third, fifth, or seventh season.

Upon entering the motorhome in the main hub, the player can view their helmet design, drivers and constructors championship standings, settings for career mode, and a comprehensive, year-by-year summary of each driver and team (with the exception of Fernando Alonso, whose history is summarized into multi-year tidbits).

In addition to single player, F1 2010 has a feature-rich online mode that has remained popular since its launch. Players can choose from a multitude of options, whether they are looking for a quick fix or want to participate in the full procession of Qualifying and Race. There are also various options if the host is frustrated with other players' lack of caution on the track, such as making flags harsher or even turning off collisions, which enables ghost cars. Dedicated players can even choose to play a race with no driving assists, although for it to apply to all players the host must specify it. Other options include whether to use 2010 or equal car performance and the ability to play a custom championship with between 2–19 tracks and choose the weather conditions.

=== Car audio ===
The Codemasters audio team recorded real Formula 1 engines and transmissions using DPA lavs and Zoom H4 recorders onboard Force India and Mercedes GP cars, in a Scuderia Ferrari engine dyno, and track-side during races. They stitched together these various recordings into cohesive files able to modulate from 5 to 18k rpm. F1 test driver Anthony Davidson helped accurately tune the audio. The AI-cars employ a simplified audio model due to CPU restrictions.

=== Bugs ===
After release, users on all three platforms reported corrupted game saves. Codemasters confirmed that a save file could become corrupt if a certain sequence of actions were performed, for example, exiting the game after completing an R&D objective and unlocking a new upgrade in a practice session. To avoid this, the user should continue progress to the qualifying session before exiting the game. A patch to address the issue was released. PlayStation 3 users experienced corrupt data problems at other areas in the game.

Codemasters stated that some users have made "incorrect assumptions" about the game's AI, and wrongly assumed it to be a bug, by claiming that lap times were fake during a race, but was later announced that the lap times during practice and qualifying were fake because of the function of speeding the session up to x30. Codemasters said that they will fix issues with the game that are not AI specific, but are adding to the confusion around the AI.

==== Patch ====
On 18 October 2010 a community manager posted on the official Codemasters F1 2010 Forum that work was ongoing on the patch and that the patch will include most of the fixes. Almost all the bugs were reported to be fixed and some new features for the game were included in the patch. On November 1, the patch was released for the PlayStation 3 in Europe and Japan after two months of work.

After the patch, tyre wear and fuel simulation bugs still persisted. Codemasters never addressed that problem.

== Reception ==
Reception

Aggregate scores
Aggregator	Score
GameRankings	81.28% (PS3); 82.23% (X360)
Metacritic	84/100 (PS3); 84/100 (X360); 84/100 (PC)

Review scores
Publication	Score
Edge	8/10
Eurogamer	8/10
GamesRadar+	9/10
IGN	8.5/10
PlayStation Official Magazine – UK	9/10
Official Xbox Magazine (UK)	8/10
Play	86%
VideoGamer.com	9/10
GamingXP	8.2/10

The game was received positively, with developer Codemasters receiving praise for their attention to detail when it comes to developing racing games. The weather system which Codemasters aimed would be "the most comprehensive and impressive weather system ever seen in a racing game" and the execution was given a rave reception by reviewers including Official PlayStation Magazine (UK) who said "it's one of the most terrifying and intense racers ever made", giving the game 9 out of 10 overall. Australian's Pep and Max from YouTube's F1Podcast series gave the game a very positive review, awarding it "9-out-of-10 Rubber Chickens". IGN UK gave the game 8.5 out of 10, citing its impressive dynamic weather system as a plus point and even going as far to say "...it's possibly the best iteration of the sport of all time", but they criticised the career mode, the game's in-game HUD and "forgettable" soundtrack. A number of reviews (e.g. SimHQ.com and Techtree) have also specified that F1 2010 is not geared towards simulation driving model enthusiasts but offers a more arcade driving model, stating that "the impression is that the engine handling the driving physics has been tweaked very well to simulate basic car behavior in a detuned, toned-down version suitable for a game that has to gain broad market appeal, but lacks the extra bit of finesse and driveability that should be an objective for a simulator as well as for a game".

=== Awards ===
F1 2010 won the Best Sports Game category at the BAFTA Video Game Awards beating other games such as FIFA 11 and Football Manager 2010.

== See also ==
- Ambisonics, the audio technology used in the game.
