= Codemasters =

British video game developer

The Codemasters Software Company Limited
- Trade name: Codemasters
- Type: Subsidiary
- Industry: Video game
- Founded: October 1986; 40 years ago in Banbury, England
- Founders: Richard Darling; David Darling
- Headquarters: Southam, England
- Products: Video games
- Brands: Colin McRae Rally and Dirt; Dizzy; F1; Grid; Micro Machines; Game Genie
- Number of employees: 700 (2019)
- Parent: Reliance Entertainment (2010–2018); EA Sports (2021–present)
- Divisions: Codemasters Birmingham; Codemasters Kuala Lumpur
- Website: ea.com/ea-studios/codemasters

The Codemasters Software Company Limited (trade name: Codemasters) is a British video game developer and former publisher based in Southam. It is a subsidiary of American corporation Electronic Arts and managed under the EA Sports division. Founded by brothers Richard and David Darling in October 1986, Codemasters is one of the oldest British game studios, and in 2005 was named the best independent video game developer by magazine Develop. It formerly also published third-party games.

"Codemasters Group Holdings plc" was the holding company of Codemasters, which was publicly traded and owned Codemasters until being purchased by EA in 2021 for $1.2 billion.

== History ==
=== Background ===
While attending school in Vancouver, Richard Darling and his elder brother, David Darling, had learned programming with punch cards and had access to the school's computer room outside of hours through one of the school's janitors. Additionally, on weekends, they were allowed to use the Commodore PET computer owned by their father, James, to create a text version of Dungeons & Dragons. Later on, the two brothers and school friend Michael Heibert, whose family possessed a VIC-20 computer, founded Darbert Computers and created video game clones of popular games, such as Galaxian and Defender.

The Darling brothers later returned to England, where they acquired their own VIC-20 and founded Galactic Software, again with the help of Heibert. An advertisement placed in the magazine Popular Computing Weekly caught the attention of Mastertronic, a British software publisher, and the two brothers quit their education to pursue development of budget-priced games for the company. These games included Space Walk, BMX Racers, Jungle Story, Orbitron, Sub Hunt and Pigs in Space. They also developed The Games Creator, a game-making tool that would later be sold commercially. The Darling brothers found success in making these games, gaining £200,000 by the time they were 16 and 17 respectively. In 1985, the two owned a 50% stake in Mastertronic, which they proceeded to sell in March 1986 when they decided to become independent. By October 1986, the Darling brothers, with help from their father, had founded Codemasters (then called Code Masters). They initially worked out of the Beaumont Business Centre in Banbury, where their elder sister Abigail managed the front desk.

Codemasters' first game was BMX Simulator, a successor to BMX Racers. According to David Darling, the company aimed at making budget-priced games with the quality of full-priced games, as they would gain a larger customer base that would subsequently create better exposure. To produce more games in less time, Codemasters started hiring developers on a freelance basis. Products developed using this strategy include G-Man and Danger Zone by Mike Clark, Terra Cognita by Stephen Curtis, Super Robin Hood and Ghost Hunters by the Oliver Twins, Super Stuntman by Peter Williamson, Lazer Force by Gavin Raeburn, and ATV Simulator by Timothy R. Miller. By April 1987, Codemasters started seeking programmers that would create platform conversions of Codemasters' games in exchange for four-digit sums, via placements in Popular Computing Weekly.

=== 1990s ===
As the 8-bit computer market diminished, Codemasters turned to the 16-bit console market and moved away from budget titles to full-price games on the 16-bit computers — 1992 saw the last title in the Dizzy series, Crystal Kingdom Dizzy, released at full price. They had major success with the Micro Machines series and Pete Sampras Tennis on the Sega Mega Drive. Both franchises featured the J-Cart, allowing two extra controllers to be attached to the game cart without requiring Electronic Arts' 4 way play or SEGA's four-player adaptor.

Codemasters is notable for making the large majority of games published by Camerica, which bypassed Nintendo's lock-out chip by glitching it and produced unlicensed NES games. These NES games were known for being shiny gold and silver cartridges. Many Codemasters titles were also featured on Camerica's Aladdin Deck Enhancer.

In 1990, Codemasters developed a device called the Game Genie, which came out of the lockout bypass work to play unlicensed games. It was a cheat cartridge for the NES, released in the US by Galoob and in Canada and the UK by Camerica. In the case Galoob v. Nintendo, the courts concluded Game Genie did not violate Nintendo's copyright because it qualified as fair use under the law.

In an effort to establish themselves in the United States, it announced that it would launch a new development studio in Oakhurst, using offices that were abandoned by Sierra On-Line and hiring much of Yosemite Entertainment's laid off staff in mid-September 1999.

=== 1998–2009 ===
Between 1998 and 2003, Codemasters teamed up with Jester Interactive Limited to publish its range of music creation software, for PlayStation, PlayStation 2 and PC, MUSICtm, Music 2000, MTV Music Generator and MTV Music Generator 2. In 2003 this partnership was dissolved, with Jester releasing its own Music 3000 product. Codemasters released its final music based product, MTV Music Generator 3, in 2004.

Codemasters have since continued to release titles for later generation systems, such as the Brian Lara Cricket series, Colin McRae Rally and Dirt series, Dizzy series, F1 series, Grid series, LMA Manager series, Micro Machines series, Operation Flashpoint series, Overlord series, Project CARS series and TOCA series. They owned the rights to use the title Operation Flashpoint: Dragon Rising (2009), but have parted with the original developer Bohemia Interactive Studio. In spite of this, Codemasters released Operation Flashpoint: Elite, developed by Bohemia, for Xbox in October 2005. The year 2005 also saw the appointment of Rod Cousens, formerly of Acclaim, as managing director.

Former Codemasters logo

In December 2006, Warner Bros. Interactive Entertainment entered into a game distribution agreement with Codemasters to distribute the company's titles in North America. Also in April, Codemasters launched the massively multiplayer online role-playing game, The Lord of the Rings Online: Shadows of Angmar in Europe on behalf of Turbine. In June, Codemasters were purchased by equity group Balderton Capital and it changed its logo to an interlocked metallic C and M. Later that month it released the latest in the Colin McRae Rally series, Colin McRae: Dirt. They also published Overlord and Clive Barker's Jericho. Following the death of Colin McRae on 15 September 2007, Codemasters released a public statement expressing its sorrow and support for the family.

In March 2008, Codemasters announced a new partnership with Majesco which would focus on titles for DS and Wii, including Nanostray 2, Toy Shop, Cake Mania 2 and Nancy Drew: The Mystery of the Clue Bender Society for DS, and Wild Earth: African Safari, Our House and Cake Mania for Wii. In May, it was announced that Codemasters had won the rights to the Formula One licence after Sony's deal ran out and thus ending Psygnosis and Sony's Formula One series. The first resulting game, F1 2009, was released on the Wii and PlayStation Portable in November 2009, and another similar game, F1 2010, on the PC, PlayStation 3, and Xbox 360 in 2010.

On 8 April 2008, Sega announced the closure of Sega Racing Studio. The studio's only release had been Sega Rally Revo, which was greeted with fairly positive reviews but poor sales figures. At a later time Sega announced none of the employees were folded into internal studios. On 25 April 2008, Codemasters bought Sega Racing Studio. The studio was headed by Guy Wilday, who was involved in the Colin McRae Rally games and was formerly the series producer.

In the 2008 Queen's Birthday Honours, the Darlings were appointed Commanders of the Order of the British Empire (CBE) for services to the video game industry.

=== 2010–2020 ===
On 5 April 2010, Reliance Big Entertainment, an Indian company acquired a 50% stake in the company. Later in 2010, Codemasters launched the free-to-play version of Lord of the Rings Online. While originally scheduled for 10 September, it was delayed due to contractual reasons and launched on 2 November. In May 2011, Codemasters transferred control of the European Lord of the Rings Online to Turbine.

In May 2011, Codemasters signed a North American distribution deal with THQ. In March 2012, Codemasters renewed its American distribution deal with Warner Bros.

On 3 June 2011, the Codemasters.com website was breached. It is believed that the attacker was able to gain access to the personal information of registered users with Codemasters accounts. Codemasters notified its users about the attack via email on 10 June 2011, after which its websites were pulled down and users redirected to its Facebook page.

In mid-2012, it was announced that Codemasters' racing games, whether about to be produced or developed, would begin to be branded under the "Codemasters Racing" label. Dirt: Showdown and F1 2012 were the first racing titles to receive the new label name. The label was discontinued in 2016, as Codemasters' subsequent racing games, Dirt Rally and F1 2016 are branded with the regular Codemasters logo.

On 9 June 2013, Reliance Entertainment increased its stake in Codemasters from 50% to 60.41%, making it the majority owner.

In April 2015 Codemasters CEO Rod Cousens left to join Jagex, leaving COO Frank Sagnier as the new temporary CEO. In April 2016, Codemasters announced that it had hired most of the staff of racing game developer Evolution Studios after Sony closed the company.

The first Codemasters title for eighth generation consoles was F1 2015, launched in July 2015. In October 2015 it released Overlord: Fellowship of Evil, its first non-racing game since 2011.

After the disappointing sales of Onrush, several members of the Codemasters EVO development division were made redundant and the division was shifted to a support role for other titles.

Codemasters held an initial public offering to list the company on the London Stock Exchange's Alternative Investment Market on 1 June 2018. The company's shares were valued at 260 pence during trading bringing in a total of £185 million. As a result of the IPO, Reliance Entertainment held a 29.5% stake in Codemasters.

Through placings in June and November 2019, Codemasters welcomed new institutional shareholders to the register whilst providing Reliance with a highly satisfactory exit and thus ending its nine-year relationship with it.

Codemasters acquired Slightly Mad Studios, the developers of the Project CARS titles, in November 2019 for about US$30 million. The acquisition brought the total staff at Codemasters to about 700 people.

The studio acquired the exclusive licence to the World Rally Championship series in June 2020 which will begin as a five-year deal in 2023, with plans to release its first game in 2024.

=== 2020–present: As an Electronic Arts subsidiary ===
Codemasters announced in November 2020 that it had been approached to be acquired by Take-Two Interactive as a buyoff offer valued at £739.2 million. Codemasters said its board was ready to approve the deal, pending the required regulatory approvals and Take-Two's own commitment once those approvals were granted. In the same month, both Take-Two and Codemasters agreed to a Take-Two buyout of Codemasters in a stock and cash deal around US$994 million, which was expected to be completed by early 2021. Following the acquisition, Codemasters would have operated within the 2K label under its existing leadership. In a statement, Take-Two boss Strauss Zelnick said that Codemasters' racing games would fit well with its own roster of sports games. However, Take-Two's bid was subsequently trumped by Electronic Arts in December 2020, which offered to buy all outstanding shares at £6.04 for an offer valued at about US$1.2 billion, about 14% higher than Take-Two's offer. Codemasters' board of directors agreed to the EA deal, which closed by the first quarter of 2021. Take-Two formally withdrew its offer in January 2021, ceding to EA's bid, while Codemasters' board signed off on EA's bid later that month. The acquisition was completed on 18 February 2021, with all shares transferred to Codex Games Limited, a subsidiary of EA. EA's Andrew Wilson said it plans to keep Codemasters as a standalone entity within EA similar to Respawn Entertainment. Codemasters announced in July 2021 that CEO Frank Sagnier and CFO Rashid Varachia will depart the company at the end of the month, as part of the EA acquisition plan. Special vice president of product development Clive Moody and of publishing Jonathan Bunney will take over leadership of Codemasters following this.

In May 2022, EA merged Codemasters subsidiary Codemasters Cheshire into Criterion Games, an existing subsidiary of EA, as to support effort on the Need for Speed series as the two companies were already working together on a new title in the series together for months, then later that year in October, announcing a new title called Need for Speed Unbound, which was released on 2 December 2022.

In December 2023, an unknown number of employees at Codemasters were laid off by EA.

In May 2025, it was announced that Codemasters had stopped development on its WRC titles. More people were laid off as well, while an unspecified amount of other employees would move to work on other EA Sports properties.

== Technology ==
Ego is a modified version of the Neon game engine that was used in Colin McRae: Dirt and was developed by Codemasters and Sony Computer Entertainment using Sony Computer Entertainment's PhyreEngine cross-platform graphics engine. The Ego engine was developed to render more detailed damage and physics as well as render large-scale environments.
