= Scissorman =

Clock Tower antagonist

- Clock Tower character
- Scissorman in the original Clock Tower
- First appearance: Clock Tower (1995)
- Created by: Hifumi Kono
- Based on: Cropsy (The Burning)
- Designed by: Kuniomi Yoshida

Scissorman (Japanese: シザーマン, Hepburn: Shizāman) is a name used for multiple characters in the Clock Tower series, the first Scissorman appearing as the main antagonist of the original Clock Tower video game, a 10-year-old boy called Bobby Barrows. Later incarnations include his twin brother Dan Barrows and multiple copycat killers in the PlayStation Clock Tower and a pair of people called Scissorman Ralph and Scissorwoman Jemima in Clock Tower 3. The original incarnation was created by the game's creator Hifumi Kono and designed by artist Kuniomi Yoshida. He was inspired by multiple works, including the film Phenomena, film The Burning, and manga God's Left Hand, Devil's Right Hand.

Scissorman has been generally well received, regarded as among the scariest horror villains in and out of video games. This was attributed to multiple factors, including the original version's childish interests and being an early and inspirational stalking villain in video games. He is said to have inspired multiple stalking characters, including Mr. X from Resident Evil 2.

== Appearances ==
The first incarnation of Scissorman first appears in the original Clock Tower, called Bobby Barrows, the twin brother of Dan Barrows. He pursues the protagonist, Jennifer Simpson, wielding a pair of garden shears with the intention of killing her and her friends. He is largely unkillable, and thus, the player must run and hide from him. He is ultimately defeated when Jennifer activates the bells of the clock tower, causing him to become disoriented and fall to his death. In the PlayStation sequel Clock Tower, the murders of the first game become a media sensation, and a copycat killer emerges, which can be different characters depending on the player's choices. A second true Scissorman is eventually revealed, a survivor from the first game called Edward, who ultimately turns out to be Dan Barrows. He is ultimately defeated by Jennifer and a woman named Helen Maxwell when they open a portal and suck him into it. In the video game Clock Tower 3, two people assume a similar role though are unrelated to the events of the first two games, called Scissorman Ralph and Scissorwoman Jemima, resurrected after being stoned to death.

== Concept and creation ==
Scissorman is a 10-year-old boy wielding a pair of garden shears. He was created by Hifumi Kono, creator of the Clock Tower series, who stated that his design was inspired by the film Phenomena, directed by Dario Argento, to make Scissorman a child. He added that the practice of creating characters that "conspicuously resembled" from famous films was common in the 90s for video game characters. His original design was created by artist Kuniomi Yoshida. The scene of Scissorman sitting and laughing at cartoons had, according to Kono, a more unsettling fear than if he was a more serious killer.The decision to have him wield a pair of garden shears was inspired by two characters: Cropsy, a "disfigured maniac" from The Burning, and The Eroded Scissors from the manga God's Left Hand, Devil's Right Hand. He specifically cited a scene from the latter where scissors burst through the protagonist's cheek from the inside, stating that he found there to be a "genuine pain" derived in part from it being an everyday object. He also believed that the scraping sound of scissors was an effective way to convey urgency and impending danger.

== Reception ==
Scissorman has received generally positive reception. GamesRadar+ writer Sara Elsam felt that the lack of seriousness behind Scissorman, such as watching cartoons and dancing on the protagonist's corpse, contributed to him being among the greatest horror villains. Diehard Gamefan writers Alexander Lucard, Mark B, and Matt Yaeger all considered Scissorman a great villain. Lucard considered him "easily" the best horror character in a video game, as well as one of the best characters in gaming, praising how the AI for Scissorman would learn the player's pattern in order to trap the player. Yaeger also praised the AI, stating that whenever his character was hiding in the game, he was never sure whether Scissorman would find him, describing him as "the boogeyman you feared as a kid." Mark felt that he was fantastic as a villain, stating that he represents the fear that someone may one day decide they do not like a person enough to try to kill them. He felt this made him stand out from other horror villains like Pyramid Head and Nemesis, stating that someone like Scissorman could actually exist. Author Dawn Stobbart argued that Barry Barrows fulfilled the character type of the "killer in the slasher genre", stating that he features multiple features attributed to this character by professor Carol J. Clover of such a character, including a mask, signature weapon, and a "past drenched in family dysfunction."

GamesRadar+ writer Mikel Reparaz considered Scissorman among the most frightening video game villains, stating that while he may not seem as scary today, his PlayStation appearance was one of the scariest things he'd seen before. He stated that, rather than his appearance, the nature of Scissorman and his ability to appear in unexpected places was what made him so effective. Fellow GamesRadar+ writer Louis Garcia believed that Scissorman deserved his standing among the greatest video game terrors, praising how unsettling his childishness was as well as his how his appearances manage to make the player panic. GamesRadar+ writer Oscar Taylor-Kent stated that Scissorman has gone on to inspire other stalker enemy types, calling him the "original survival horror stalker." According to Den of Geek writer Matthew Byrd, the Resident Evil 2 character Mr. X was inspired by Scissorman. Kono's later game, NightCry, has a character named Scissor Walker, who resembles Scissorman according to Polygon writer Matt Leone. In her review of Clock Tower: Rewind, Siliconera Stephanie Liu stated that while she found her frightening as a child, she now consider him more of an annoyance. stating that the game is too generous to the player in encounters with Scissorman, which she felt reduced tension too much.
