= Jennifer Simpson (Clock Tower) =

Clock Tower protagonist

- Clock Tower character
- Jennifer Simpson in the 1995 Clock Tower
- First appearance: Clock Tower (1995)
- Based on: Jennifer Corvino (Phenomena)
- Designed by: Hifumi Kono
- Voiced by: English: Rumiko Varnes (1996 video game) Cat Protano (Clock Tower: Rewind); Japanese: Chinami Nishimura (Clock Tower 2 drama CD)

Jennifer Simpson is a character in the Clock Tower series of video games. She first appears as the protagonist of the 1995 Clock Tower, and later appeared in the sequel Clock Tower on the PlayStation, where she was co-protagonist with the character Helen Maxwell. She is a normal teenage girl, and is forced to run and hide from a relentless killer called Scissorman. She was created by the game's director, Hifumi Kono, who took inspiration for both her name and design from the character Jennifer Corvino played by Jennifer Connelly in the film Phenomena. Jennifer Simpson has been the subject of commentary by critics, both in terms of her similarities to Corvino and how well she represents the role of the "final girl" in the series.

== Appearances ==
Jennifer Simpson first appeared in the video game Clock Tower as its protagonist, where she is adopted alongside other girls by a woman named Ms. Mary Barrows and taken to live in the Barrows Mansion. After searching for Ms. Barrows, Jennifer returns to find everyone missing. As she progresses through the mansion, she finds her friends either dead or endangered, and discovers that Ms. Barrows intends to feed all the girls to her other children. She also contends with a villainous stalker called Scissorman, who stalks Jennifer through the mansion with a large pair of garden shears. Jennifer is required to run and hide for much of the game to survive. The game can end in multiple ways, most of which involving Jennifer dying. She reappears in the sequel, Clock Tower for the PlayStation, having survived the encounter at the mansion and moving to Oslo. She tells police about the murders, and the incident becomes known as "The Scissorman Murders". A year later, she begins working with Helen Maxwell and undergoing therapy, and a copycat killer of Scissorman begins killing people Jennifer knows. The game allows people to play it from the perspective of either Jennifer or Helen.

A Clock Tower pop up store was opened in Akihabara, featuring merchandise depicting Jennifer as well as other iconography from the series.

== Concept and creation ==
Jennifer Simpson is a teenage girl with black hair who was created by Clock Tower director Hifumi Kono. She was named and designed after Jennifer Conelly, particularly in the Dario Argento film Phenomena, Jennifer Corvino, whom she dresses similarly to. Kono stated that he enjoyed Corvino because she was more than a typical final girl, stating that she did more than just "run and hide" as she also put herself in danger out of altruism. When creating her design, Kouno photographed a real person and then the photo into a CGI model. He employed an employee in the planning division of Human Entertainment, whom he stated provided most of her motions and did well. The identity of her motion actor is speculated to be Yasuko Terada by Time Extension writer John Szczepaniak, who argued that she was listed in the main cast and worked as a director at Human Entertainment.

== Reception ==
Jennifer Simpson's role as a horror protagonist has been analyzed by multiple writers. According to MeriStation writer Laura Luna, Jennifer Simpson represented a unique type of character in horror games at the time, being someone who could not fight. She felt that her showing vulnerability helped her develop her own strengths, finding ways to avoid her pursuer and survive without being able to overpower him. Bloody Disgusting writer Alex Meehan felt that Jennifer Simpson and Jennifer Corvino were similar visually and conceptually, arguing that Simpson's intense reactions lined up with the lack of subtlety portrayed by female leads in Argento's films. He also felt that Simpson's fear affecting her possibility of survival reflected how victims in Argento's films operated. Anime News Network writer Jean-Karlo Lemus felt that she inspired multiple horror characters. He felt that the protagonist of the unreleased video game The Girl Who Wasn't There was based on her design, while her trauma from the incident inspired characters like Aya Brea from Parasite Eve and Miku Hinasaki from Fatal Frame.

Writer Matthew Weise argued that Jennifer was the "textbook final girl" due to her abilities being limited to running, hiding, and outsmarting the antagonist. He stated that, when in control of Jennifer, the player is limited to her "psychological limits" as a final girl, citing the player's inability to make Jennifer take the scissors from Scissorman after he is knocked unconscious. He argued that she was different from other horror video game protagonists due to how the player is required to work within her emotional state and managing her fear. Analyzing the sequel, Weise argued that Helen Maxwell, the co-protagonist, was a better fit for the role of final girl than Jennifer. He stated that Jennifer was more feminine than Helen and that Jennifer has a boyfriend where Helen does not. He also compared their outfits, noting that Jennifer wears a tight skirt and knee-high boots, while Helen wears a suit and trousers. Writer Dawn Stobbart agreed with this assessment of Jennifer, stating that she is not "endowed with superhuman strength" and that this was due in part to the game's point-and-click gameplay. Author Carl Wilson disputed this interpretation of her as the textbook final girl, arguing that there were several endings where others can survive, but also endings where Jennifer does not.
