= Haunting Ground =

2005 video game

- North American box art
- Developer: Capcom
- Publisher: Capcom
- Director: Kazuhiro Tsuchiya
- Producer: Koji Nakajima
- Designer: Yukio Ando
- Programmer: Jun Takahashi
- Writers: Makoto Ikehara; Noboru Sugimura
- Composers: Seiko Kobuchi; Shinya Okada
- Platform: PlayStation 2
- Release: JP: April 21, 2005; PAL: April 29, 2005; NA: May 10, 2005
- Genre: Survival horror
- Mode: Single-player

Haunting Ground (Note: Known in Japan as Demento (Japanese: デメント)) is a 2005 survival horror video game developed and published by Capcom for the PlayStation 2. The story follows Fiona Belli, a young woman who wakes up in the dungeon of a castle after being involved in a car accident. The player controls Fiona as she befriends a White Shepherd, Hewie, and explores the castle with his aid to seek a means of escape and unravel the mysteries of it and its inhabitants. The game shares many similarities with Capcom's earlier survival horror title Clock Tower 3, and has been described as a spiritual successor to the Clock Tower series.

Haunting Ground was released April 2005 and received mixed reviews. The graphics, presentation, and themes of sexuality and vulnerability were praised, although critics found the gameplay somewhat repetitive, predictable, and derivative of previous horror titles.

== Gameplay ==
Fiona escapes from Debilitas after ordering Hewie to attack him.

Haunting Ground is a survival horror game with similar gameplay elements to Clock Tower 3 (2002). The player controls Fiona Belli directly and gives commands to her canine companion, Hewie. Fiona can run and perform a backstep maneuver, both of which reduce stamina. She can also crouch down to hide from enemy pursuers. Fiona can kick and tackle enemies as well, but tackling also reduces stamina. Losing too much stamina will result in Fiona becoming exhausted, causing her movements to slow down or possibly stop altogether. Exhaustion can be revived with certain items or with time. Fiona can interact with the environment by checking items, opening doors, and climbing ladders. The player can utilize hiding spots to evade pursuers. Other areas act as retaliation points that allow Fiona to use her environment to counterattack against her enemy, although some of these locations can only be used once.

Commanding Hewie is an integral part of Haunting Ground's gameplay. At the beginning of the game, he won't be completely friendly and obey all of Fiona's commands. The player has to build a friendship and gain his trust in order to survive the game. Hewie can be told to sniff out items, check suspicious areas or items, attack an enemy, or called back to Fiona's side. The player can praise Hewie by petting and feeding him, both of which can heal his vitality. Likewise, he can be scolded when he won't listen to commands. He can be told to "stand ready" before attacking, which increases his attack power.

Enemies can hear footsteps and other sounds. When Fiona is in a dangerous situation, she may fall into a panic. During panic mode, visibility gets worse, the menu can't be opened, and she will begin running on her own, tripping and falling into walls. Panic mode will elapse after some time, or certain items can be used to calm her down. There are glowing orbs called "Luminescents", which will put Fiona in a state of panic and attract enemies to her. If Fiona sustains a significant amount of damage, she will slow down and become unable to back-step. If she receives too much damage she can die. Damage heals with time or items can be used to bring her vitality back to normal. While some items are used to heal Fiona and Hewie, others are used to damage enemies. Some can be thrown while others are set like traps for the enemy to walk over. Some items are found by searching while others can be crafted in refining rooms.

== Plot ==
Fiona Belli is an 18-year-old woman who recently moved to college. While visiting her parents, Ugo and Ayla, the family is involved in a car crash, and Fiona alone awakens in a cage in the dungeon of a castle. Her memories of the incident are hazy. Noting that the cage that keeps her prisoner has been left unlocked, she steps out and begins searching for answers and a way out of the castle. Soon after, she befriends a White Shepherd named Hewie. As Fiona begins to unravel the mystery in which she finds herself, she learns that she is the carrier of the Azoth, an alchemic element, which for unknown reasons is being sought by Riccardo, the castle's keeper.

The first enemy Fiona encounters is Debilitas, a large, mentally disabled groundskeeper who thinks of Fiona as one of his dolls. Fiona learns from a mysterious man named Lorenzo, that to escape the castle, she needs a staff from the chapel. However, upon taking the staff, Debilitas corners Fiona and Hewie, forcing a violent confrontation. They defeat Debilitas, but soon find their next enemy, Daniella, an icy maid. Daniella covets Fiona's ability to smell, taste, touch, feel, and "experience pleasure." She is especially jealous that Fiona can create life (via a fertile womb). Daniella is defeated when she is impaled with a shard from a ceiling window pane.

The third villain is Riccardo, who wields a flintlock pistol. For the majority of the game, Riccardo keeps his face hidden under a hood. Upon revealing himself however, Fiona is shocked to see her dead father's face. Riccardo reveals that he and her father, Ugo, are clones. He murdered Ugo in the car accident as revenge for leaving the castle and marrying Fiona's mother. He plans to use Fiona (by means of her womb and use of her Azoth) to bring about his own rebirth, so that he may live forever. As they fight atop a water tower, Hewie rescues Fiona by attacking Riccardo, causing him to fall from the summit.

The final enemy is Lorenzo, who seemed to be an ally, but who now menaces Fiona in several different forms. Fiona first meets him as an old, crippled man. He tells Fiona that Riccardo was always the problem child, and that he created both Riccardo and Ugo in an attempt to find a body with an Azoth which he could use to gain immortality. Ugo had the Azoth, but left the castle to marry Ayla. Now with Riccardo dead, Lorenzo believes that Fiona is his, so he can take the Azoth she inherited from her father. He chases after Fiona, but she is able to crush him in a rock press. However, she soon encounters a resurrected, youthful Lorenzo; the life energy he acquired from Riccardo's body has allowed him mastery over his own aging process. With the help of Hewie, Fiona causes Lorenzo to fall into a pit of lava. At this point, the castle begins to shake and collapse, and Lorenzo returns as a flaming skeleton. He chases Fiona as she heads for the exit, and attempts to block her escape, but as they reach the door, he finally dies, and Fiona and Hewie leave the castle.

The game features multiple endings based on decisions made by the player: if Debilitas survives, he encounters Fiona and Hewie at the castle gate and lets them leave peacefully, otherwise he does not appear. If the game has been completed at least once and Debilitas survives, Fiona and Hewie can leave the castle early in the game, leaving a frustrated Lorenzo within. If Hewie's relationship with Fiona is poor, he does not rescue her at a critical juncture in the game, resulting in Riccardo capturing and impregnating Fiona.

== Development and release ==
Concept art of Fiona. Critics would later point out her design as emphasizing her sexual attributes.

Capcom began development knowing they wanted to make a survival horror game with a lead female character. Believing that the female lead would not be well received by retailers and players alike, they added in a dog partner that could attack enemies. After this change, further design of gameplay centered on this partner mechanic. The cinematics were directed by actor and director, Naoto Takenaka. He directly supervised the motion capture performances used for all the characters, placing emphasis on dramatic performance. He took inspiration from Universal Monsters such as Frankenstein and Bela Lugosi's Dracula. Takenaka played the motion capture role for Riccardo, and Japanese actors Yasue Sato and Jiro Sato played Fiona and Debilitas respectively. Rather than streaming audio files, the music for Haunting Ground was generated by using the PS2's built-in sounds. This way, the composers could easily change the tempo of the music during gameplay.

Capcom debuted Haunting Ground under its Japanese title Demento at the Tokyo Game Show in September 2004. The game was released in Japan on April 21, 2005, and later in PAL territories on April 29, and in North America on May 10. Critics described the game as a spiritual successor to the Clock Tower series, although it has never been officially declared as such.

In July 2012, Haunting Ground appeared to be slated for a PlayStation 3 re-release as a "PS2 Classic", having been rated by the ESRB with Sony Computer Entertainment named as the publisher. It was re-released for the PlayStation 3 via the PlayStation Store exclusively in Japan in April 2015.

== Reception ==
Reception

Aggregate score
Aggregator	Score
Metacritic	67/100

Review scores
Publication	Score
1Up.com	C+
Edge	7/10
Electronic Gaming Monthly	6.17/10
Eurogamer	7/10
Famitsu	31/40
G4	3/5
Game Informer	4.75/10
GamePro	3/5
GameRevolution	C−
GameSpot	7.2/10
GameSpy	3.5/5
GameZone	7/10
IGN	7.7/10

Haunting Ground received "mixed or average" reviews according to review aggregator Metacritic. Critics were quick to compare it to the Clock Tower series, specifically its 2002 installment, Clock Tower 3 (2002). The defenseless heroine elements and hide-and-chase gameplay were found to be highly derivative of the former titles. The dog companion was, for some, a well-received addition to the gameplay formula, with Eurogamer's Kristan Reed comparing it positively to Ico. Others found the dog and other gameplay elements to be repetitive and contributors to poor pacing. The graphics, cinematics, and atmosphere were universally praised. The staff at 1UP.com described the environments as "some of the most detailed, lavish 3D environments Capcom has ever produced". Kill Screen's Astrid Budgor compared Haunting Ground's "psychological landscape" to Dario Argento's film Suspiria (1977) and also highlighted its grotesque expressionism. Despite these highlights, critics ultimately felt that Haunting Ground was too predictable and relied heavily on clichés previously established in the horror genre. For this reason, Reed said it "becomes stifled by its own eventual lack of ambition to break away from the norms instilled by two generations of Japanese horror adventures". The staff at 1UP.com felt the game was dated when compared with the recently released Resident Evil 4 (2005), but said: "Haunting Ground isn't without merit, it's just that the merits are buried deep in an occasionally thrilling, mostly 'been there, done that' game of indistinct origin".

Some critics highlighted Haunting Ground's sexual themes surrounding the objectification of Fiona as one of its best elements. Jeremy Dunham of IGN stated that "Haunting Ground's success comes from making the player feel like a desired and endangered object". He found the plot was kept interesting due to the disturbing suggestive behaviors of Fiona's pursuers. Kill Screen's Budgor also found the drive for the enemies to kill Fiona creates a continuous tension, as its unclear, chaotic nature lends to an uncomfortable confusion for both Fiona and the player. GameSetWatch's Leigh Alexander stated that "disparaging Haunting Ground for its copious objectification of women is a facile task...it's precisely that off-putting sexuality that makes Daniela terrifying, that makes Fiona's circumstances so explicitly repugnant, that sharpens Haunting Ground's fear factor to a knife in the gut". Alexander praised the game's voyeuristic themes and presenting of Fiona as "an object of desire". She notes that "Fiona is both a sex object and a victim...a fragile little woman...both male and female players can distinctly feel the threat to her person, the disconcerting wickedness of her enemies, thanks to her overt sexualization throughout the game". Budgor found that removing the player's control at critical points highlights Fiona's subjectivity, with the sounds and images expressing ideas of "violation, transgression, and bodily autonomy". Alexander ultimately felt Haunting Ground to be a "perfect illustration of how sexuality can be used to great effect".

== Legacy ==
Haunting Ground has been a subject of game studies regarding the relationship between players and their avatars. It was found that the altering states of Fiona's subjectivity change the role of the player in the game. The player is never a spectator, nor do they take on the embodiment of Fiona, but float between these states of involvement.

Fiona appeared as a character card in SNK vs. Capcom: Card Fighters DS (2006), and as a costume for Cammy in Street Fighter V (2016). Fiona, Hewie and Debilitas were also seen in a cutscene in Tatsunoko vs. Capcom: Ultimate All-Stars.
