= Clock Tower II: The Struggle Within =

1998 video game

- North American cover art
- Developer: Human Entertainment
- Publishers: JP: Human Entertainment; NA: Agetec
- Director: Yutaka Hirata
- Producer: Yuichi Kobayashi
- Designer: Yutaka Hirata
- Programmer: Kazuhiro Takeshima
- Artists: Masatsugu Igarashi; Kiichi Takaoka
- Writer: Yutaka Hirata
- Composer: Kaori Takazoe
- Series: Clock Tower
- Platform: PlayStation
- Release: JP: March 12, 1998; NA: November 3, 1999
- Genres: Point-and-click adventure, survival horror
- Mode: Single-player

Clock Tower II: The Struggle Within, known in Japan as Clock Tower: Ghost Head, (Note: Japanese: クロックタワー ゴーストヘッド, Hepburn: Kurokku Tawā Gōsuto Heddo) is a horror-themed adventure game developed by Human Entertainment and released for the PlayStation in 1998. It is the third game in the Clock Tower series. The story follows 17-year-old Alyssa Hale who occasionally is possessed by an alter ego named Mr. Bates. The player must guide Alyssa through various environments, altering between her normal and twisted personality, to uncover the secrets of her and her family's past.

Clock Tower II was met with negative reviews. Journalists heavily criticized the gameplay which they found to be poor due to its slow and dated point-and-click interface, as well as its reliance on trial-and-error mechanics. The story was criticized by some but found to be mature and creepy by others. Critics ultimately did not recommend the game except to those looking for an experience similar to Clock Tower (1996) and those looking for a game that, like a cult film, is flawed conventionally but redeemed by its willingness to stray from the mainstream.

== Gameplay ==
Alyssa runs to a door after the player double-clicked it.

Following its predecessors, Clock Tower II is a point-and-click adventure game with 3D graphics and survival horror elements. The player can use either a standard PlayStation controller or the PlayStation Mouse to control the protagonist, Alyssa Hale, through the game. The cursor changes shape when placed over certain objects, which the player can click to interact with. Clicking on any location guides Alyssa in that direction. Moving the cursor to the top of the screen reveals the player's inventory. Clicking on an item and then clicking on an object on the screen uses the item on that object or in that location.

Alyssa starts the game with an amulet which keeps her alter ego, Mr. Bates, from emerging and controlling her. However, the amulet can be placed within cases or other containers. Without the amulet, Alyssa will become Mr. Bates if provoked with fear. To revert to Alyssa, the player needs to simply retrieve the amulet back. Some events can only be cleared as Mr. Bates and likewise some only as Alyssa. The choices the player makes as both Alyssa and Mr. Bates change the scenario development and lead to one of 13 possible endings.

When Alyssa is being chased or is in danger, the cursor will flash red. During this panic mode, the player must rapidly tap a button to escape. When escaping enemies, click points will appear on items or objects that Alyssa can use to fight back or hide from the enemy. Escape mode will not end until the enemy is repulsed or successfully evaded. If playing as Mr. Bates, the player may use weapons such as pistols and shotguns against the enemies. When equipped with a weapon, the cursor becomes a crosshair used to aim and shoot. The cursor changes color during panic mode from white, to yellow, and finally red to indicate Alyssa's stamina. First aid kits can be used to improve stamina by one level. If Alyssa's stamina reaches zero or the player fails a panic scenario, the screen will read "game over" and provide the player the option to restart from the last room they entered with one extra stamina level.

== Plot ==
Alyssa Hale is a 17-year-old high school girl who, during the spring of 1999, is on her way to a distant town in California to visit her father's friend Phillip Tate. Previously, it was discovered that another person resides in Alyssa's soul named Bates. Alyssa underwent intense therapy because she lost control of him. Along the way to Phillip's home, Alyssa looks at her amulet, which she believes has some sort of power over her. As she stares at it, she realizes that it must somehow be related to Bates, as she remembers not having it when she awoke from Bates' invasion of her psyche. Meanwhile, at the house, Philip and his wife Kathryn hear a noise at the door, Kathryn goes to see if it is Ashley. Philip says something about the "Maxwell Curse", before Kathryn screams and he rushes over to see what is happening. When Alyssa arrives at the Tate's residence that night, no one appears to be home. She comes across her cousin's bedroom to find her cousin Ashley decapitated. Her other cousin Stephanie attacks her with a knife and stalks her around the house. She hears a series of odd noises through the home and eventually finds Philip, who requests that she burn a statue related to the Maxwell Curse. Stephanie tries to stop her but Alyssa turns into Bates and stabs her, severely wounding her. Alyssa manages to throw the statue into a fireplace, freeing Stephanie from her possession but loses consciousness.

She wakes up in a zombie-infested hospital and meets a detective named Alex Corey, who saved Alyssa from the house and tells her Stephanie will survive her injuries. She is later overrun by zombies as she tries to escape and faints. When she awakens again, she finds that Alex took her to a pharmaceutical lab. She soon finds a man armed with a hatchet and wearing an oni mask named George Maxwell, who begins to stalk her. She also finds her father, Allen. He explains that Alyssa is not his daughter, but rather, the daughter of George. The Maxwell Curse states that every few generations, cursed children with a cruel alter-ego are born into the Maxwell line. To protect their family, they must be buried beneath the Maxwell tree as soon as they are born and left to die. Allen, jealous of George's wealth, dug up the child with Philip to spite him. George tries to attack Alyssa, but Allen shoots him. He then requests Alyssa to go, explaining that the building is about to explode. Alyssa escapes with the aid of Alex and watches the building burn from the hillside. Alyssa mourns her father's death, claiming that she should have died instead; but is consoled by Alex who tells her that she already practically died there in the past and can start anew.

== Development and release ==
Clock Tower II was the last Clock Tower game developed by Human Entertainment. It was also the first in the series not directed by series creator Hifumi Kono. Kono was asked by Human to make a sequel to the first two games, but he felt he was out of material and could not make it. Yutaka Hirata stepped in and offered to direct the game. Its Japanese title, Clock Tower: Ghost Head, was changed to Clock Tower II in North America due to the first game being released exclusively to Japan and the second game was retitled Clock Tower for western audiences. It was not given a numbered title in Japan because it moves away from the story and setting in the two previous Clock Tower titles, and is considered a spin-off, taking place in the "real world" outside of the continuity of the series which establishes the first two games as fiction. (Note: If the player directs Alyssa to examine a poster of 1996's Clock Tower (labeled by its Japanese title as Clock Tower 2) with series protagonist Jennifer Simpson on the cover, she will reply "This isn't a game!") In the Japanese release, the game is set in Osaka. This was changed to California for the North American release. In the North American release, Alyssa's alter ego, Mr. Bates, is voiced by Roger L. Jackson, known as the voice of Ghostface from the Scream franchise. The game supports enhanced rumble features in DualShock controllers.

The game was released on March 12, 1998, in Japan, and on November 3, 1999, in North America. A drama CD based on the game was released in 1998. The game was re-released on the PlayStation Store in Japan on May 9, 2012.

== Reception ==
Reception

Aggregate score
Aggregator	Score
Metacritic	49/100

Review scores
Publication	Score
AllGame	2.5/5
Famitsu	24/40
GameSpot	3.9/10
IGN	4.8/10
Official U.S. PlayStation Magazine	2.5/5

According to review aggregator platform Metacritic, Clock Tower II was met with "generally unfavorable" reviews. The game is generally considered to be the worst in the entire Clock Tower series of games. The gameplay was found to be flawed due to the dual personality mechanic and poor storytelling methods. Joe Fielder of GameSpot described the puzzles as counter-intuitive, like being stuck on a Rubik's Cube and coming back later to find the cube solved. In the same vein, he noted how sometimes events are triggered or areas become accessible only after spending time exploring other unrelated areas. Mark MacDonald writing for Official U.S. PlayStation Magazine shared these sentiments, saying the player spends most of their time wandering around, hoping to trigger the next event. The point-and-click interface was also criticized as slow and inaccurate.

Fielder criticized the graphics as "pure first-generation PlayStation" and believed the sound design was also poor. Marc Nix of IGN argued the sound design was good and the graphics were clear and sharp but the scenery was ultimately lifeless. The story was criticized by some, but MacDonald found it to be more adult and "out there-spooky" than any other PlayStation title yet. Mark Kanarick of AllGame heavily criticized the voice acting, describing it as the worst aspect of the game.

Ultimately, Fielder could not recommend Clock Tower II as an adventure or horror game, saying "leave this one for the antique collectors". Nix felt the game fell considerably short of its potential. He found the rumble feature the "sole perfect feature of the game". MacDonald called the game "seriously flawed, but unique". He described it as a terrible game in a conventional sense, but like a cult film, it is redeemed by its willingness to take risks and stand apart from the mainstream and therefore is "strictly for hardcore niche gamers". Kanarick called it a poor attempt at a survival horror game, but that fans of Clock Tower (1996) may enjoy it.

The Electric Playground presented Clock Tower II with its 1999 "Console Adventure Game of the Year" award. The editors called it "decidedly the best of the few challengers" in its field, despite competition from the PlayStation release of Broken Sword II: The Smoking Mirror.
