= Terror of the Stratus =

2011 video game

- Developer(s): Nude Maker
- Publisher(s): Konami
- Composer(s): Nobuko Toda; Shuichi Kobori; Ludvig Forssell
- Platform(s): PlayStation Portable
- Release: JP: October 27, 2011
- Genre(s): Action role-playing
- Mode(s): Single-player

Terror of the Stratus, known in Japan as Senritsu no Stratus, (Note: Japanese: 戦律のストラタス, Hepburn: Senritsu no Sutoratasu) is an action video game developed by Nude Maker and published by Konami for the PlayStation Portable. It was released in Japan on October 27, 2011.

== Gameplay ==
The game has two different main gameplay modes. In "extermination mode", the game plays much like a 3D third-person shooter, while in "defense mode", the game plays like a 2D sidescroller.

== Development ==
The game was first announced by Konami in May 2011. It was announced to be made by developer Nude Maker, who had previously developed Infinite Space with PlatinumGames, and Steel Battalion prior to that.

On October 20, 2011, a demo of the game was released on the Japanese PlayStation Network, allowing the first chapter of the game to be played.

The game was released digitally on the PlayStation Network, and physically at retail. The retail version exclusively came with a sixteen-page artbook by character designer Katsumi Enami.

== Reception and sales ==
The game charted as the ninth best-selling game during it first week of release, selling 15,623 copies.
