= Survival horror =

Video game subgenre

Survival horror is a subgenre of action-adventure games. Although combat can be part of the gameplay, the player is made to feel less in control than in typical action games through limited ammunition or weapons, health, speed, and vision, or through various obstructions of the player's interaction with the game mechanics. The player is also challenged to find items that unlock the path to new areas and solve puzzles to proceed in the game. Games make use of strong horror themes, such as dark mazelike environments and unexpected attacks from enemies.

The term "survival horror" was first used for the original Japanese release of Resident Evil in 1996, which was influenced by earlier games with a horror theme such as 1989's Sweet Home and 1992's Alone in the Dark. The name has been used since then for games with similar gameplay and has been retroactively applied to earlier titles. Starting with the release of Resident Evil 4 in 2005, the genre began to incorporate more features from action games and more traditional first person and third-person shooter games. This has led game journalists to question whether long-standing survival horror franchises and more recent franchises have abandoned the genre and moved into a distinct genre often referred to as "action horror."

Since the release of the Resident Evil 2 remake in 2019, several journalists and critics have described the current period in time as a "renaissance" for the survival horror genre, citing the renewed popularity of both new titles and remakes of classic games like Silent Hill 2.

== Definition ==
Survival horror refers to a subgenre of action-adventure games which draws heavily from the conventions of horror fiction. While many action games feature lone protagonists versus swarms of enemies in a suspenseful environment, survival horror games are distinct from otherwise horror-themed action games. The player character is vulnerable and under-armed, which puts emphasis on puzzle-solving and evasion, rather than the player taking an offensive strategy. Games commonly challenge the player to manage their inventory and ration scarce resources such as ammunition. Another major theme throughout the genre is that of isolation. Typically, these games contain relatively few non-player characters and, as a result, frequently tell much of their story second-hand through the usage of journals, texts, or audio logs.

Still, it is not unusual for survival horror games to draw upon elements from first-person shooters, or even role-playing games. According to IGN, "Survival horror is different from typical game genres in that it is not defined strictly by specific mechanics, but subject matter, tone, pacing, and design philosophy."

== Game design ==
=== De-emphasized combat ===
Survival horror games are a subgenre of action-adventure games, where the player is unable to fully prepare or arm their avatar. The player usually encounters several factors to make combat unattractive as a primary option, such as a limited number of weapons or invulnerable enemies; if weapons are available, their ammunition is sparser than in other games, and powerful weapons such as explosives are rare, if even available at all. Thus, players are more vulnerable than in action games, and the hostility of the environment sets up a narrative where the odds are weighed decisively against the avatar. This shifts gameplay away from direct combat, and players must learn to evade enemies or turn the environment against them. Games try to enhance the experience of vulnerability by making the game single-player rather than multiplayer, and by giving the player an avatar who is more frail than the typical action game hero.

The survival horror genre is also known for other non-combat challenges, such as solving puzzles at certain locations in the game world, and collecting and managing an inventory of items. Areas of the game world will be off limits until the player gains certain items. Occasionally, levels are designed with alternative routes. Levels also challenge players with mazelike environments, which test the player's navigational skills. Levels are often designed as dark and claustrophobic (often making use of dim or shadowy light conditions and camera angles and sightlines which restrict visibility) to challenge the player and provide suspense, although games in the genre also make use of enormous spatial environments.

=== Enemy design ===
A survival horror storyline usually involves the investigation and confrontation of horrific forces, and thus many games transform common elements from horror fiction into gameplay challenges. Early releases used fixed camera angles that were similar to the camera work in horror films, which allowed enemies to lurk in areas that are concealed from the player's view. Also, many survival horror games make use of off-screen sound or other warning cues to notify the player of impending danger. This feedback assists the player but also creates feelings of anxiety and uncertainty.

Survival horror games typically feature a variety of monsters with unique behavior patterns. Enemies can appear unexpectedly or suddenly, and levels are often designed with scripted sequences where enemies drop from the ceiling or crash through windows. Survival horror games, like many action-adventure games, are sometimes structured around the boss encounter where the player must confront a formidable opponent in order to advance to the next area. These boss encounters draw elements from antagonists seen in classic horror stories, and defeating the boss will advance the story of the game.

== History ==
=== Origins (1980s–1996) ===
The origins of the survival horror game can be traced back to earlier horror fiction novels. Archetypes have been linked to the books of H. P. Lovecraft, which include investigative narratives, or journeys through the depths. Comparisons have been made between Lovecraft's Great Old Ones and the boss encounters seen in many survival horror games. Themes of survival have also been traced to the slasher film subgenre, where the protagonist endures a confrontation with the ultimate antagonist. Another major influence on the genre is Japanese horror, including classical Noh theatre, the books of Edogawa Rampo, and Japanese cinema. The survival horror genre largely draws from both Western (mainly American) and Asian (mainly Japanese) traditions, with the Western approach to horror generally favoring action-oriented visceral horror while the Japanese approach tends to favour psychological horror.

AX-2: Uchū Yusōsen Nostromo was a survival horror game developed by Akira Takiguchi, a Tokyo University student and Taito contractor, for the PET 2001. It was ported to the PC-6001 by Masakuni Mitsuhashi (also known as Hiromi Ohba, later joined Game Arts), and published by ASCII in 1981, exclusively for Japan. Inspired by the 1979 Japanese only stealth game Manbiki Shounen (Shoplifting Boy) by Hiroshi Suzuki and the 1979 sci-fi horror film Alien, the gameplay of Nostromo involved a player attempting to escape a spaceship while avoiding the sight of an invisible alien, which only becomes visible when appearing in front of the player. The gameplay also involved limited resources, where the player needs to collect certain items in order to escape the ship, and if certain required items are not available in the warehouse, the player is unable to escape and eventually has no choice but to be caught and killed by the alien.

Another early example is the 1982 Atari 2600 game Haunted House. Gameplay is typical of future survival horror titles, as it emphasizes puzzle-solving and evasive action, rather than violence. The game uses creatures commonly featured in horror fiction, such as bats and ghosts, each of which has unique behaviors. Gameplay also incorporates item collection and inventory management, along with areas that are inaccessible until the appropriate item is found. Because it has several features that have been seen in later survival horror games, some reviewers have retroactively classified this game as the first in the genre.

Malcolm Evans' 3D Monster Maze, released for the Sinclair ZX81 in 1982, is a first-person game without a weapon; the player cannot fight the enemy, a Tyrannosaurus rex, so they must escape by finding the exit before the monster finds them. The game states its distance and awareness of the player, further raising tension. Edge stated it was about "fear, panic, terror and facing an implacable, relentless foe who’s going to get you in the end" and considers it "the original survival horror game". Retro Gamer stated, "Survival horror may have been a phrase first coined by Resident Evil, but it could’ve easily applied to Malcolm Evans’ massive hit."

1982 saw the release of another early horror game, Bandai's Terror House, based on traditional Japanese horror, released as a Bandai LCD Solarpower handheld game. It was a solar-powered game with two LCD panels on top of each other to enable impressive scene changes and early pseudo-3D effects. The amount of ambient light the game received also had an effect on the gaming experience. Another early example of a horror game released that year was Sega's arcade game Monster Bash, which introduced classic horror-movie monsters, including the likes of Dracula, Frankenstein's monster, and werewolves, helping to lay the foundations for future survival horror games. Its 1986 remake Ghost House had gameplay specifically designed around the horror theme, featuring haunted house stages full of traps and secrets, and enemies that were fast, powerful, and intimidating, forcing players to learn the intricacies of the house and rely on their wits. Another game that has been cited as one of the first horror-themed games is Quicksilva's 1983 maze game Ant Attack.

The latter half of the 1980s saw the release of several other horror-themed games, including Konami's Castlevania in 1986, and Sega's Kenseiden and Namco's Splatterhouse in 1988, though despite the macabre imagery of these games, their gameplay did not diverge much from other action games at the time. Splatterhouse in particular is notable for its large amount of bloodshed and terror, despite being an arcade beat 'em up with very little emphasis on survival.

Shiryou Sensen: War of the Dead, a 1987 title developed by Fun Factory and published by Victor Music Industries for the MSX2, PC-88 and PC Engine platforms, is considered the first true survival horror game by Kevin Gifford (of GamePro and 1UP) and John Szczepaniak (of Retro Gamer and The Escapist). Designed by Katsuya Iwamoto, the game was a horror action RPG revolving around a female SWAT member Lila rescuing survivors in an isolated monster-infested town and bringing them to safety in a church. It has open environments like Dragon Quest and real-time side-view battles like Zelda II, though War of the Dead departed from other RPGs with its dark and creepy atmosphere expressed through the storytelling, graphics, and music. The player character has limited ammunition, though the player character can punch or use a knife if out of ammunition. The game also has a limited item inventory and crates to store items, and introduced a day-night cycle; the player can sleep to recover health, and a record is kept of how many days the player has survived. In 1988, War of the Dead Part 2 for the MSX2 and PC-88 abandoned the RPG elements of its predecessor, such as random encounters, and instead adopted action-adventure elements from Metal Gear while retaining the horror atmosphere of its predecessor.

Sweet Home (1989), pictured above, was a role-playing video game often called the first survival horror game and is cited as the main inspiration for Resident Evil.

However, the game often considered the first true survival horror, due to having the most influence on Resident Evil, was the 1989 release Sweet Home, for the Nintendo Entertainment System.It was created by Tokuro Fujiwara, who would later go on to create Resident Evil. Sweet Home's gameplay focused on solving a variety of puzzles using items stored in a limited inventory, while battling or escaping from horrifying creatures, which could lead to permanent death for any of the characters, thus creating tension and an emphasis on survival. It was also the first attempt at creating a scary and frightening storyline within a game, mainly told through scattered diary entries left behind fifty years before the events of the game. Developed by Capcom, the game would become the main inspiration behind their later release Resident Evil. Its horrific imagery prevented its release in the Western world, though its influence was felt through Resident Evil, which was originally intended to be a remake of the game.

In 1989, Electronic Arts published Project Firestart, developed by Dynamix. Unlike most other early games in the genre, it featured a science fiction setting inspired by the film Alien but had gameplay that closely resembled later survival horror games in many ways. Travis Fahs considers it the first to achieve "the kind of fully formed vision of survival horror as we know it today," citing its balance of action and adventure, limited ammunition, weak weaponry, vulnerable main character, feeling of isolation, storytelling through journals, graphic violence, and use of dynamically triggered music - all of which are characteristic elements of later games in the survival horror genre. Despite this, it is not likely a direct influence on later games in the genre and the similarities are largely an example of parallel thinking.

Alone in the Dark (1992) is considered a forefather of the survival horror genre, and is sometimes called a survival horror game in retrospect.

In 1992, Infogrames released Alone in the Dark, which has been considered a forefather of the genre. The game featured a lone protagonist against hordes of monsters, and made use of traditional adventure game challenges such as puzzle-solving and finding hidden keys to new areas. Graphically, Alone in the Dark uses static prerendered camera views that were cinematic in nature. Although players had the ability to fight monsters as in action games, players also had the option to evade or block them. Many monsters could not be killed, and thus could only be dealt with using problem-solving abilities. The game also used the mechanism of notes and books as expository devices. Many of these elements were used in later survival horror games, and thus the game is credited with making the survival horror genre possible.

In 1994, Riverhillsoft released Doctor Hauzer for the 3DO. Both the player character and the environment are rendered in polygons. The player can switch between three different perspectives: third-person, first-person, and overhead. In a departure from most survival horror games, Doctor Hauzer lacks any enemies; the main threat is instead the sentient house that the game takes place in, with the player having to survive the house's traps and solve puzzles.

In 1995, WARP's horror adventure game D featured a first-person perspective, CGI full-motion video, gameplay that consisted entirely of puzzle-solving, and taboo content such as cannibalism. The same year, Human Entertainment's Clock Tower was a survival horror game that employed point-and-click graphic adventure gameplay and a deadly stalker known as Scissorman that chases players throughout the game. The game introduced stealth game elements, and was unique for its lack of combat, with the player only able to run away or outsmart Scissorman in order to survive. It features up to nine different possible endings.

Resident Evil (1996) named and defined the survival horror genre.

The term "survival horror" was first used by Capcom to market their 1996 release, Resident Evil. It began as a remake of Sweet Home, borrowing various elements from the game, such as its mansion setting, puzzles, "opening door" load screen, death animations, multiple endings depending on which characters survive, dual character paths, individual character skills, limited item management, story told through diary entries and frescos, emphasis on atmosphere, and horrific imagery. Resident Evil also adopted several features seen in Alone in the Dark, notably its cinematic fixed camera angles and pre-rendered backdrops. The control scheme in Resident Evil also became a staple of the genre, and future titles imitated its challenge of rationing very limited resources and items. The game's commercial success is credited with helping the PlayStation become the dominant game console, and also led to a series of Resident Evil films. Many games have tried to replicate the successful formula seen in Resident Evil, and every subsequent survival horror game has arguably taken a stance in relation to it.

=== Golden age (1996–2004) ===
The success of Resident Evil in 1996 was responsible for its formula being used as the basis for a wave of successful survival horror games, many of which were referred to as "Resident Evil clones." The golden age of survival horror started by Resident Evil reached its peak around the turn of the millennium with Silent Hill, followed by a general decline a few years later. Among the Resident Evil clones at the time, there were several survival horror titles that stood out, such as Clock Tower (1996), Clock Tower II: The Struggle Within (1998), and Dino Crisis (1999) for the PlayStation. These Clock Tower games proved to be hits, capitalizing on the success of Resident Evil while staying true to the graphic-adventure gameplay of the original Clock Tower rather than following the Resident Evil formula. Another survival horror title that differentiated itself was Corpse Party (1996), an indie, psychological horror adventure game created using the RPG Maker engine. Much like Clock Tower and later Haunting Ground (2005), the player characters in Corpse Party lack any means of defending themselves; the game also featured up to 20 possible endings. However, the game would not be released in Western markets until 2011. Riverhillsoft's Overblood, released in 1996, is considered the first survival horror game to make use of a fully three-dimensional virtual environment. The Note in 1997 and Hellnight in 1998 experimented with using a real-time 3D first-person perspective rather than pre-rendered backgrounds like Resident Evil.

In 1998, Capcom released the successful sequel Resident Evil 2, which series creator Shinji Mikami intended to tap into the classic notion of horror as "the ordinary made strange". Rather than setting the game in a creepy mansion no one would visit, he wanted to use familiar urban settings transformed by the chaos of a viral outbreak. The game sold over five million copies, proving the popularity of survival horror. That year saw the release of Square's Parasite Eve, which combined elements from Resident Evil with the RPG gameplay of Final Fantasy. It was followed by a more action-based sequel, Parasite Eve II, in 1999. In 1998, Galerians discarded the use of guns in favor of psychic powers that make it difficult to fight more than one enemy at a time. Also in 1998, Blue Stinger was a fully 3D survival horror game for the Dreamcast incorporating action elements from beat 'em up and shooter games.

The Silent Hill series, pictured above, introduced a psychological horror style to the genre. The most renowned was Silent Hill 2 (2001), for its strong narrative.

Konami's Silent Hill, released in 1999, drew heavily from Resident Evil while using real-time 3D environments in contrast to Resident Evil's pre-rendered graphics. Silent Hill in particular was praised for moving away from B movie horror elements to the psychological style seen in art house or Japanese horror films, due to the game's emphasis on a disturbing atmosphere rather than visceral horror. The game also featured stealth elements, making use of the fog to dodge enemies or turning off the flashlight to avoid detection. The original Silent Hill is considered one of the scariest games of all time, and the strong narrative from Silent Hill 2 in 2001 has made the Silent Hill series one of the most influential in the genre. According to IGN, the "golden age of survival horror came to a crescendo" with the release of Silent Hill.

A game similar to the Clock Tower series of games and Haunting Ground, which was also inspired by Resident Evil's success, is the Korean game known as White Day: A Labyrinth Named School (2001). "White Day" was reportedly so scary that the developers had to release several patches adding multiple difficulty options, and the game was originally slated for localization in 2004 but abruptly cancelled. Building on its previous success in Korea and interest, a remake was developed in 2015.

Fatal Frame from 2001 was a unique entry into the genre, as the player explores a mansion and takes photographs of ghosts in order to defeat them. The Fatal Frame series has since gained a reputation as one of the most distinctive in the genre, with the first game in the series credited as one of the best-written survival horror games ever made. Meanwhile, Capcom incorporated shooter elements into several survival horror titles, such as 2000's Resident Evil Survivor which used both light gun shooter and first-person shooter elements, and 2003's Resident Evil: Dead Aim which used light gun and third-person shooter elements.

Western developers began to return to the survival horror formula. The Thing from 2002 has been called a survival horror game, although it is distinct from other titles in the genre due to its emphasis on action, and the challenge of holding a team together. The 2004 title Doom 3 is sometimes categorized as survival horror, although it is considered an Americanized take on the genre due to the player's ability to directly confront monsters with weaponry. Thus, it is usually considered a first-person shooter with survival horror elements. Regardless, the genre's increased popularity led Western developers to incorporate horror elements into action games, rather than follow the Japanese survival style.

Overall, the traditional survival horror genre continued to be dominated by Japanese designers and aesthetics. 2002's Clock Tower 3 eschewed the graphic adventure game formula seen in the original Clock Tower, and embraced full 3D survival horror gameplay. In 2003, Resident Evil Outbreak introduced a new gameplay element to the genre: online multiplayer and cooperative gameplay. Sony employed Silent Hill director Keiichiro Toyama to develop Siren. The game was released in 2004, and added unprecedented challenge to the genre by making the player mostly defenseless, thus making it vital to learn the enemy's patrol routes and hide from them. However, reviewers eventually criticized the traditional Japanese survival horror formula for becoming stagnant. As the console market drifted towards Western-style action games, players became impatient with the limited resources and cumbersome controls seen in Japanese titles such as Resident Evil – Code: Veronica and Silent Hill 4: The Room.

=== Transformation (2005–2018) ===
In 2005, Resident Evil 4 attempted to redefine the genre by emphasizing reflexes and precision aiming, broadening the gameplay with elements from the wider action genre. Its ambitions paid off, earning the title several Game of the Year awards for 2005, and the top rank on IGN's Readers' Picks Top 99 Games list. However, this also led some reviewers to suggest that the Resident Evil series had abandoned the survival horror genre, by demolishing the genre conventions that it had established. Other major survival horror series followed suit by developing their combat systems to feature more action, such as Silent Hill: Homecoming, and the 2008 version of Alone in the Dark. These changes were part of an overall trend among console games to shift towards visceral action gameplay. These changes in gameplay have led some purists to suggest that the genre has deteriorated into the conventions of other action games. James Stephanie Sterling suggests that the genre lost its core gameplay when it improved the combat interface, thus shifting the gameplay away from hiding and running towards direct combat. Leigh Alexander argues that this represents a shift towards more Western horror aesthetics, which emphasize action and gore rather than the psychological experience of Japanese horror.

The original genre has persisted in one form or another. The 2005 release of F.E.A.R. was praised for both its atmospheric tension and fast action, successfully combining Japanese horror with cinematic action, while Dead Space from 2008 brought survival horror to a science fiction setting. However, critics argue that these titles represent the continuing trend away from pure survival horror and towards general action. The release of Left 4 Dead in 2008 helped popularize cooperative multiplayer among survival horror games, although it is mostly a first-person shooter at its core. Meanwhile, the Fatal Frame series has remained true to the roots of the genre, even as Fatal Frame IV transitioned from the use of fixed cameras to an over-the-shoulder viewpoint. Also in 2009, Silent Hill made a transition to an over-the-shoulder viewpoint in Silent Hill: Shattered Memories. This Wii effort was, however, considered by most reviewers as a return to form for the series due to several developmental decisions taken by Climax Studios. This included the decision to openly break the fourth wall by psychologically profiling the player, and the decision to remove any weapons from the game, forcing the player to run whenever they see an enemy.

Examples of independent survival horror games are the Penumbra series and Amnesia: The Dark Descent by Frictional Games, Nightfall: Escape by Zeenoh, Cry of Fear by Team Psykskallar and Slender: The Eight Pages, all of which were praised for creating a horrific setting and atmosphere without the overuse of violence or gore. In 2010, the cult game Deadly Premonition by Access Games was notable for introducing open world nonlinear gameplay and a comedy horror theme to the genre. Five Nights at Freddy's effectively incorporated jump scares into the genre with the first game in the series releasing in 2014. Further evolution of the genre was carried out via platforms such as itch.io that allowed independent creators to distribute games more easily and therefore became hives of experimentation, an example of which is the emergence of games with PS1-style low-poly aesthetics, such as those developed by Puppet Combo, that became a genre unto itself which eventually went on to be published on more mainstream storefronts such as Steam. Overall, game developers have continued to make and release survival horror games, and the genre continues to grow among independent video game developers.

The Last of Us, released in 2013 by Naughty Dog, incorporated many survival horror elements into a third-person action-adventure game. Set twenty years after a pandemic plague, the player must use scarce ammo and distraction tactics to evade or kill malformed humans infected by a brain parasite, as well as dangerous survivalists. This was followed by a sequel in 2020.

Shinji Mikami, the creator of the Resident Evil franchise, released his new survival horror game The Evil Within, in 2014. Mikami stated that his goal was to bring survival horror back to its roots as he was disappointed by recent survival horror games for having too much action. That same year, Alien: Isolation, developed by Creative Assembly and based on the Alien science fiction horror film series, was released. The game updated the concept of a single un-killable villain chasing the protagonist throughout most of the game, requiring the player to use stealth in order to survive.

In 2015, Until Dawn, developed by Supermassive Games, was published by Sony Computer Entertainment for the PlayStation 4. The game is an interactive drama in which the player controls multiple characters and features a butterfly effect system in which the player's choices can change the story and may dictate who survives the night. All playable characters can survive or die, depending on the choices made. Players explore the environment from a third-person perspective and find clues that may help solve the mystery.

Multiplayer asymmetrical survival horror games gained popularity as well. Dead by Daylight, released in 2016, features one player taking on the role of a killer and four others play as survivors. The game is also notable for featuring multiple characters from other survival horror franchises, such as Resident Evil and Silent Hill. Other examples which use similar one versus four gameplay include Friday the 13th: The Game, VHS, Evil Dead: The Game, and The Texas Chain Saw Massacre.

The Resident Evil series abandoned its action-oriented direction beginning with 2017's Resident Evil 7: Biohazard. The game utilizes a first-person perspective and encourages resource management and puzzle-solving, more akin to earlier entries in the franchise.

=== Renaissance (2019–present) ===
Following the commercial success of Resident Evil 2, a remake of the 1998 version that sold over 4 million copies in its first month and 15.8 million by April 2025, other video game companies were encouraged to create remakes of their survival horror franchises. These earlier titles were updated with modern graphics while retaining their survival horror aspects, as seen in the remakes of Resident Evil 3, Resident Evil 4, Dead Space, Alone in the Dark, Silent Hill 2, and Fatal Frame II: Crimson Butterfly. After these remakes were well received and financially successful, this new era of survival horror has been referred to by gaming journalists as a 'renaissance'.

The renewed interest in classic survival horror also contributed to the launch of new games such as Signalis, Crow Country, or Cronos: The New Dawn, all original survival horror titles released between October 2022 and September 2025. It also prompted developers of existing franchises to adapt new titles to be more focused on survival horror, as seen in the sequels Alan Wake 2 and The Sinking City 2 whose respective predecessors had a more action-oriented approach.

== See also ==
- Horror game
- List of horror games
- Survival game
