= NightCry =

2016 video game

- Developer: Nude Maker
- Publisher: Playism
- Director: Hifumi Kono
- Producers: Douglas Watt; Shunji Mizutani
- Designers: Shoya Ikeda; Takashi Shimizu
- Programmers: Masaki Higuchi; Yuki Yamazaki
- Artists: Masahiro Ito; Chris Darril; Kiyoshi Arai
- Writer: Hifumi Kono
- Composers: Nobuko Toda; Michiru Yamane
- Platforms: Windows, PlayStation Vita
- Release: Windows; 29 March 2016; PlayStation Vita; 31 January 2019
- Genres: Graphic adventure, survival horror
- Mode: Single-player

NightCry (Note: Japanese: ナイトクライ, Hepburn: Naito Kurai) is a graphic adventure survival horror video game developed by Nude Maker and published by Playism Games. NightCry is directed and written by Clock Tower series creator Hifumi Kono, and is considered a spiritual successor to the series. It was first released for Windows in March 2016, and later for the PlayStation Vita in January 2019. Ports for Android and iOS were also planned, but never released.

== Plot ==
NightCry largely takes place on the Oceanus, an ocean liner attacked by an evil creature called the Scissor Walker. There are three chapters to the game with a different controllable character in each. In Chapter 1, Monica Flores is the main character, a lady being set up for a date on the cruise. In Chapter 2, the main character is Leonard Cosgrove, a professor who explores a nearby island's ruin guarded by cultists. In Chapter 3, the main character is Rooney Simpson, a morose girl and Leonard's distant relative/student also on the Oceanus attempting to escape the Scissor Walker and discover the truth behind the attack. Other characters include Eric, a crew member, and Vigo Boradsov, the owner of the Oceanus, leader of a cult called the Faithful and the one responsible for bringing the Scissor Walker on the ship.

There are eight endings. Two shows Monica and Rooney are rescued or killed by the Scissor Walker, which makes Eric the sole survivor. Four has Rooney either kidnapped by the cult; trapped playing with Connie, Rooney's childhood friend who died years ago; forced to sleep by Vigo or being killed by Leonard if she did not kill him earlier. One features Monica sacrificed by the cult, the other depicts everyone on the ship mysteriously disappeared.

== Gameplay ==
NightCry is a 3D point-and-click adventure. Players move the character by clicking on the place where they want them to walk to, and interact with objects and people by pressing on them. During chase sequences, the player character can sprint to get away faster, but doing so causes them to eventually tire and collapse in exhaustion, leaving them unable to escape from a pursuer.

== Development ==
The game was directed by Hifumi Kono as a spiritual successor to the Clock Tower series. Kono notes that the female protagonist of NightCry is louder and more confident than the female protagonist from Clock Tower. Kono collaborated with film director Takashi Shimizu on the project, who directed a 12 minute short film to promote the game.

Originally intended to be released for Android and iOS, the game took to crowdfunding platform Kickstarter to raise funds for a PC version in January 2015. The campaign was successful, raising US$314,771 (equivalent to $427,546 in 2025) by February 2015. The Windows version was released on 29 March 2016, while a PlayStation Vita port was released in North America on 31 January 2019. Though it was originally announced that the mobile versions would be released even if the Kickstarter campaign failed, neither mobile version was ever released.

== Reception ==
Reception

Aggregate score
| Aggregator | Score |
|---|---|
| Metacritic | PC: 44/100 |

Review scores
| Publication | Score |
|---|---|
| Adventure Gamers | PC: 2/5 |
| Destructoid | PC: 2/10 |
| Digitally Downloaded | PC: 4.5/5 |
| Gaming Age | VITA: F |
| Multiplayer.it | PC: 3/10 |
| PlayStation Universe | VITA: 2/10 |
| Vandal | PC: 6/10 |

Critical reception to NightCry was mostly negative. Caitlin Cooke of Destructoid gave the game a 2 out of 10, saying that in light of the numerous game-breaking bugs, the absence of voice acting from most scenes, and the unreliable controls, all of which remained even after several post-release updates, she could not "recommend anyone play NightCry unless you have a steel resolve, unlimited time on your hands, and a penchant for terrible physics and animations straight out of the PS2 era." Reviewing the game for Adventure Gamers, Drummond Doroski echoed Cooke's complaints with the controls and lack of voice acting, but said his biggest disappointment was with the story, since that was the aspect he felt the Clock Tower series most excelled at. He found too many of the plot points were unexplained or simply baffling, though he credited the game for having a handful of genuinely creepy and even outright scary moments. He gave it two out of five stars, and summarized, "I had a lot of fun playing NightCry, but I have to admit that the nostalgic feelings it evoked made me much more willing to overlook some of its many flaws, as objectively it's far from the best of games. ... frustrating controls, mediocre graphics, and a baffling story undermine what should have been a solidly scary adventure." In contrast, L. Harvard of Digitally Downloaded gave the game a 4.5 out of 5, calling it "an authentic Clock Tower-style, classic stalker horror experience for the modern day. ... The ambition and the unique vision of NightCry genuinely make me excited that there is a future in traditional gameplay."

Leo Faria of Way Too Many Games gave the Vita version a 3.5 out of 10, citing the extraordinarily numerous loading screens, primitive graphics, and minimal touchscreen use despite the point-and-click gameplay format. He described it as "extremely glitchy and at times borderline unplayable." PlayStation Universe's Eric Hauter went further, calling it "an unholy animated mannequin of a videogame, writhing and kicking and drooling on itself, failing in almost every way it is possible for a game to fail. This is a game that – had it been released in 1992 – would have been dubbed ugly and unplayable." He criticized the story as incomprehensible, the animation as bizarrely unrealistic, the interface as confusing and poorly explained, the loading screens as excessively frequent, and the controls for the chase sequences as unmanageable. He gave it a 2 out of 10.
