= Clock Tower (1995 video game) =

1995 video game

- Developer: Human Entertainment (Note: 2024 Windows version and Rewind ports developed by WayForward)
- Publisher: Human Entertainment (Note: 2024 Windows version and Rewind ports published by Limited Run Games)
- Director: Hifumi Kono
- Producer: Hiroyasu Ichizaki
- Programmers: Naoki Sonoda; Nobuhiro Fujii
- Artist: Akiyoshi Iijima
- Composer: Kōji Niikura
- Series: Clock Tower
- Platforms: Super Famicom: The First Fear; PlayStation; Windows; WonderSwan; Rewind; Nintendo Switch; PlayStation 4; PlayStation 5; Windows; Xbox Series X/S
- Release: September 14, 1995: Super Famicom; JP: September 14, 1995 The First Fear; Windows; JP: March 28, 1997 PlayStation; JP: July 17, 1997 WonderSwan; JP: December 9, 1999 Rewind; Nintendo Switch, PlayStation 4, PlayStation 5, Windows, Xbox Series X/S; WW: October 29, 2024; JP: October 31, 2024
- Genres: Survival horror, point-and-click adventure
- Mode: Single-player

Clock Tower (Note: Japanese: クロックタワー, Hepburn: Kurokku Tawā) is a point-and-click survival horror video game developed and published by Human Entertainment for the Super Famicom in 1995. It is the first installment in the Clock Tower series. The story follows orphan Jennifer Simpson soon after she is adopted by the Barrows family along with other orphaned girls. Shortly after arriving at the Barrows family manor, one of the other children is killed by a stalker called Scissorman. Jennifer must then explore the Barrows Mansion to find a way to escape while evading Scissorman, leading to one of the game's multiple endings. Clock Tower utilizes a point-and-click interface with the player controlling a cursor to direct Jennifer's actions.

Much of Clock Tower's plot and artistic style are inspired by the works of Italian horror film director Dario Argento, most notably Phenomena (1985). Director Hifumi Kono loved horror films like this and wanted the game to feel like one. Many of the game's character graphics were digitized from photos of real people. Jennifer's movements were constructed from a woman in Human's planning division acting out the scenes. Her design was inspired by Jennifer Connelly's character in Phenomena.

The game sold well upon release. In retrospective reviews, Clock Tower has been praised for its haunting atmosphere, but the puzzles and exploration have drawn criticism for being tedious. It is considered an influence on horror games and a pioneer of the survival horror genre.

An updated version, titled Clock Tower: The First Fear, was ported to the PlayStation, WonderSwan, and Windows in 1997. In the early 2010s, it was re-released again on the PlayStation Network, as well as the Wii and Wii U Virtual Console. An enhanced port of the game, Clock Tower: Rewind, was released on October 29, 2024 for eighth- and ninth-generation consoles, as well as PC. The game had previously never been officially released outside Japan, although fan translations existed.

== Gameplay ==
Jennifer struggling with Bobby while in 'panic mode'

Clock Tower is a survival horror point-and-click adventure game with 2D graphics. The player controls a cursor to direct the main character, Jennifer Simpson, and give commands such as investigating objects or opening doors. Jennifer can walk and run, although running will reduce her stamina. She may recover her stamina by sitting on the floor. Jennifer's character portrait in the corner of the screen will change depending on her stamina level. In addition to interacting with objects in the game, Jennifer can also store them in the inventory for later use. The layout of items changes with each playthrough.

Jennifer is under the constant threat of a stalker named Scissorman. When Scissorman is confronted, the game will enter "panic mode". Depending on Jennifer's health status, she may begin to trip, slow down and eventually be killed. Jennifer cannot use weapons against Scissorman. Instead, the player must find hiding spots throughout the mansion, or use traps placed in the environment. If caught, the player can rapidly press a button which allows them an attempt to escape. If Jennifer dies, then it is game over, returning the player to the title screen with an option to continue the game. The game features nine possible endings.

== Plot ==
The story follows Jennifer Simpson, an orphan from the fictional Granite Orphanage in Romsdalen, Norway. She and other orphaned children named Laura, Anne, and Lotte are adopted in September 1995 by a wealthy recluse named Simon Barrows, who lives in a mansion known as the "Clock Tower", named after its predominant feature. After arriving at the mansion, Mary, the woman who brought the children to the mansion, leaves to find Mr. Barrows. When she takes an unusually long time, Jennifer offers to investigate. Upon leaving the room, she hears a scream coming from the main foyer. Jennifer returns to find the lights off and the girls missing. After finding either Laura or Anne killed, she finds herself being stalked by a murderous little boy with deformed features, wielding a huge pair of scissors, named Bobby Barrows, also known as the Scissorman in the game.

While exploring the mansion, Jennifer searches for Mary's true intentions. Depending on choices made by the player, Jennifer will either discover Simon Barrows trapped in a jail cell inside the courtyard, or her father's corpse in a hidden room. If the former happens, Jennifer will need to give him a piece of ham as food. If the latter happens, Jennifer will find his death letter that tells of his account concerning Mary Barrows and her twins, Bobby and Dan. It says that he was trapped there for three days, until his death on November 10, 1986. Jennifer then visits a small, occult-looking church. If the player has collected all the necessary items and clues, then she gains access to the catacombs of the mansion—using either the Devil Idol or the Sceptor, but the former is canonical as it appears in the sequel. Jennifer sees a cloaked figure walking ahead of her; this is Mary. She follows it, wearing a disguise to fool the guard dog using Mary's perfume, and a black cloak found in the mansion. If Lotte did not need to rescue Jennifer from the jail cell, she can be found dying at an altar, and tells Jennifer about the switches in the clock tower. Otherwise, she rescues Jennifer from the jail cell, but is shot by a threatening Mary.

Jennifer enters a room where she discovers Dan Barrows, a giant, gluttonous purple creature. Dan awakens from his slumber and chases Jennifer to a steep cliff. She successfully climbs over, knocking down a can of kerosene which splashes onto a nearby candle. This triggers an explosion that immolates Dan, while Jennifer rides an elevator out of the catacombs. She ends up defeating Bobby in the clock tower, and Mary as well in (or around, depending on prior actions) the clock tower. If Anne (or Laura) has not died yet, then this survivor reunites with Jennifer at the clock tower but is soon thrown down the tower by Mary. These actions would lead to one of Endings A, B, or C—any of these could be canonical according to the events of the next game. Because of the game's open-ended nature, the player can also discover other endings.

== Development ==
The design of protagonist Jennifer Simpson was inspired by that of Jennifer Corvino from Phenomena (played by Jennifer Connelly).

Clock Tower was directed by Hifumi Kono, who wished to use the game to pay homage to one of his favorite film directors, Dario Argento. Most notably, the game borrows many ideas and is inspired by his film Phenomena (1985). Clock Tower has strong relations to its plot and shares other similarities with Argento's 1980s films, such as occult themes, distressed young women, and bright colors atop a foggy setting. Kono had a passion for old horror films, and wanted Clock Tower to feel like one.

Kono described Clock Tower as an experimental project with a small budget and staff. His peers believed that a game where the protagonist runs away from the enemy would not work, but he continued on despite these concerns. Due to lack of staffing resources, developer Human Entertainment could not include mouse support and also needed to shrink the map down significantly. Although the graphics are two-dimensional, the mansion is designed within a 3D space. The character graphics in Clock Tower were created by digitizing photographs of real people, a popular technique at the time. The actress for Jennifer was a woman in Human's planning division. Many of the motions in the game came from her acting, such as hanging from a roof and stumbling in the hallway.

== Release ==
Clock Tower was first released on the Super Famicom on September 14, 1995. According to Kono, the game sold "fairly well". It was later re-released under the title Clock Tower: The First Fear on PlayStation on July 17, 1997. Upon release, the PlayStation version made it the 8th on the sales charts, selling 54,293 copies. This release featured a new dagger weapon, a new room, minor scenario additions, full motion video scenes, and minor graphical improvements. It was also released for Windows 95. A monochrome version with no pause option and some HUD changes was later released for WonderSwan.

Clock Tower was digitally re-released for the Wii and Wii U Virtual Console in Japan in 2010 and 2013, respectively. It has also reached multiple PlayStation devices via a release on the PlayStation Network in 2011, also exclusively in Japan. Until 2024, Clock Tower had never been officially released outside Japan; however, fan translations existed. In 2015, the soundtrack was released, titled CLOCK TOWER 20th Anniversary Sound Collection. This includes audio from the original, PlayStation, and Windows versions of the game, as well as music from the games Clock Tower 2, and Clock Tower: Ghost Head. In 2020, a fan made patch for the Super Famicom version was released that added features from the PlayStation version like mouse support. In 2025, a fan translation was released for the WonderSwan version. A fan version for the Game Boy Advance, titled Clock Tower Advance, was also released in 2025.

=== International localization ===
In July 2023, WayForward and Limited Run Games announced an enhanced version of the original game, Clock Tower: Rewind. It was released on October 29, 2024 on Nintendo Switch, PlayStation 4, PlayStation 5, Microsoft Windows and Xbox Series X/S, marking the game's first official international localization.

== Reception ==
Reception

Review scores
Publication	Score
Famitsu	8/10, 7/10, 8/10, 8/10 (SFC); 7/10, 7/10, 7/10, 6/10 (PS)
Dengeki PlayStation	80/100, 65/100 (PS)

For the Super Famicom release, the four reviewers of Famitsu commented on the game's difficulty and how scary it was. Hirokazu Hamamura wrote that the transition from silence to a sudden event would get the players heart racing/ while another reviewer said that the game is so scary it will make players weep. Three reviewers commented on the difficulty, saying the slightest mistake will lead to a game over. One reviewer recommended to play with a walkthrough, while another said that was just the nature of adventure games.

The publication later compared the PlayStation version to Clock Tower 2 (1996). One reviewer found it superior to the sequel in terms of horror while one said the sequel had obviously superior graphics, but the same level of terror as the follow-up. One reviewer complimented that its biggest selling point was its low price of 3800 yen. and the WonderSwan version a 22 out of 40.

In a retrospective review, Hernando Vallejo of Hardcore Gaming 101 described Clock Tower as "one of the most thrilling experiences the [horror] genre can offer". He praised the game's graphics and sound for building a strong atmosphere. Allistair Pinsof of Destructoid praised the graphics, story, and the Dario Argento-inspired style for creating a haunting mood and atmosphere. He also praised the multiple endings and unique gameplay design. However, he found Clock Tower failed to create an interesting adventure experience due to the difficulty of navigating the mansion layout, excessive item hunting, and simple puzzles. He criticized the game's attempt to place a 3D space within a 2D game, which created confusion when exploring. Despite these flaws, he still found Clock Tower worth playing, calling it "atmospheric horror at its most raw, for better or worse". Both The A.V. Club and Pinsof believed that although Clock Tower aged poorly, it was still worth experiencing.

Clock Tower has been seen as influential on Japanese horror video games, and is considered instrumental in establishing the survival horror genre alongside the 1992 video game Alone in the Dark. It also solidified Human Entertainment as a developer along with Twilight Syndrome and Laplace no Ma. The game was included in lists of best horror games. The 2016 mook Perfect Guide to Nostalgic Super Famicom ranked the game the second-best horror game for the Super Famicom, in 2018, The A.V. Club placed the game as number 30 on its list of top 35 horror games of all time. In 2022, HobbyConsolas listed it on their top 20 horror games of all time.
