= Infinite Space =

2009 video game

- North American box art featuring (from left to right) Kira, young Yuri, and Nia
- Developers: Nude Maker; PlatinumGames
- Publisher: Sega
- Director: Hifumi Kono
- Producer: Atsushi Inaba
- Designer: Naoki Terashima
- Programmer: Masaki Higuchi
- Artists: Sawaki Takeyasu; Kazutaka Miyatake
- Writer: Hifumi Kono
- Composers: Masafumi Takada; Jun Fukuda; Etsuko Ichikawa; Yusuke Komori
- Platform: Nintendo DS
- Release: JP: June 11, 2009; NA: March 16, 2010; PAL: March 26, 2010
- Genre: Role-playing
- Modes: Single-player, multiplayer

Infinite Space (Note: Japanese: 無限航路, Hepburn: Mugen Kōro) is a role-playing video game developed by Nude Maker and PlatinumGames and published by Sega for the Nintendo DS. It was released in Japan on June 11, 2009 and internationally in 2010. The science fiction storyline, set across the Small and Large Magellanic Clouds, follows the life and growth of Yuri as he first confronts the aggressive expansion of the Lugovalian Empire, then a greater alien threat. Gameplay involves Yuri's fleet travelling across the galaxies, fighting in both scripted battles and random encounters, with the battle system featuring real-time commands and both ships and crew being customizable.

The project emerged when producer Atsushi Inaba contacted Nude Maker to produce a title together, as Inaba had enjoyed working with them on Steel Battalion while he was at Capcom. The story, created by director Hifumi Kono, drew inspiration from numerous Western and Japanese science fiction works, particularly the work of authors Arthur C. Clarke and Greg Egan, and anime creator Yoshiyuki Tomino. The characters were designed by Capcom veterans Sawaki Takeyasu and Tatsuro Iwamoto, while spaceship designs were handled by a large team which included Kazutaka Miyatake of Studio Nue.

The game was released under one of a four-game publishing deal between PlatinumGames and Sega, acting as their debut in Japan and their third title in the West after MadWorld and Bayonetta. It was promoted in Japan with an anime short film co-produced by Gonzo and Production I.G, released in several parts in both Japanese and English. It saw generally positive reviews, with praise going to its narrative and gameplay mechanics. Criticism across Japanese and Western critics involved its high difficulty. It was a commercial disappointment, selling approximately 200,000 units worldwide, attributed to cartridge manufacturing costs and the narrative's niche appeal.

== Gameplay ==
A battle sequence in Infinite Space.

Infinite Space is a science fiction role-playing video game where players take on the role of protagonist Yuri, who leads a growing fleet of spaceships across different galaxies. The narrative is presented through non-interactive story cutscenes presented using 2D static images, while other elements including battles and exploration are presented using 3D graphics. The entire game is controlled by the touchscreen. Neither characters nor spacecraft are controlled directly, but instead use a style similar to a point-and-click game. While the main plot is unchanging, many smaller elements feature a non-linear branching narrative dictated by choices from the player. These choices can determine a particular path through the narrative, or allow a new character to join Yuri's fleet. Travelling between planets causes a ship crew's fatigue level to rise, impeding their efficiency. Stopping at a space port or planet removes fatigue and replenishes the fleet's health.

During navigation between planets, Yuri can both enter scripted encounters that advanced the narrative, or random encounters with pirate fleets or other enemy groups. Battles play out in real-time, relying on tactical commands of a fleet of up to five ships facing an equal number of enemy ships. Movement and position play a role in battle, as some weapon types can only activate a certain ranges. After a certain point, melee options are unlocked both for close-range ship combat and ground-based battles either between board parties on ships or on planet surfaces. Attack types are dependant on the command gauge, which fills up over time and is depleted upon selection an action. Similar to the concept of rock paper scissors, each attack type cancels out one attack while being weak to another; dodging nullifies Barrage attacks, while normal attacks are certain hits while dodging. The color outline of ships and ground parties indicates what types of move they can activate.

A key part of building up Yuri's fleet is gathering ship blueprints, buying parts from space ports, and customizing ships. Ship customization is handled by arranging building blocks within a limited grid, which alters a ship's abilities and statistics. Crew members can also be recruited during the main and side scenarios from ship ports, having different statistics which influence performance in battle and granting different boons depending on where they are placed within the crew hierarchy. After battles, the player is awarded with experience points, raising ship and character statistics. Multiplayer spaceship battles are also available for two-players to play competitively over local Wi-Fi, selected from an option on the bridge of Yuri's ship and isolated from the main campaign. After completing the game for the first time, a New Game+ feature is unlocked, allowing statistics and other elements to be carried over into a new playthrough.

== Synopsis ==
=== Setting and characters ===
Infinite Space is set in the far future, where humanity has expanded beyond the Milky Way to colonise neighbouring galaxies including the Small and Large Magellanic Clouds (SMC and LMC), with travel between distant locations accomplished using Void Gates, constructs of an ancient civilization. A notable space phenomenon are Flux Sectors, areas of space where reality is in an unstable state. A recurring feature of the setting are groups called Zero-G Dogs, who act as mercenaries fighting with different factions and are alternately admired and despised. Key objects of power are Epitaphs, cube-shaped objects from ancient times that are said to open a gateway to a divine realm.

The two major powers in the galaxies are the Galactic Federation, formed from nations across the SMC and LMC; and the Lugovalian Empire, controlling a quarter of the known universe and now expanding towards the Milky Way cluster under the guidance of Emperor Taranis. The protagonist is Yuri from the planet Ropesk, the inhabitants of which have been banned from space travel. He is taken from Ropesk by Nia, a Zero-G Dog he hires to escape the planet. A key character is Kira, his sister who is initially taken hostage after his departure. Other key characters encountered by Yuri are the notorious pirate Valantin; Cico, a Lugovalian who later becomes the Empire's crown prince; and Patriarch Bogd, leader of the Holy Nation of Adis.

=== Plot ===
Yuri, yearning to leave Ropesk, contacts Nia and pawns an Epitaph he believes to have been his father's to buy a ship. Kira is kidnapped by Ropesk's leader to force Yuri to return, but instead Yuri breaks Kira free, then learns that his Epitaph was stolen from the pawn shop by the pirate Valantin. Yuri and a growing crew of Zero-G Dogs go on the hunt for Valantin, ending up caught in the political struggles surrounding the aggressive expansion of the Lugovalian Empire into the SMC. He also runs into Cico, who allies with him during a difficult battle. Despite multiple battles, the Lugovalian Empire conquers the SMC, destroying the most powerful fleets and prompting other powers to surrender. Yuri allies with the sympathetic nation Regeinland from the LMC, but their attempt to hold off the Lugovalian forces ends in failure forcing the Regeinland fleet to use a weapon to send a nearby sun into supernova, destroying all surrounding ships and the Void Gate connecting the two galaxies which prevents the Lugovalian fleet from quickly traveling to the LMC. Nia, whose family and planet were brutally conquered by the Lugovalian Empire, sacrifices herself in an attempt to kill the Lugovalian commander so Yuri can escape to the LMC.

Ten years later, Yuri is in prison, put there along with all SMC refugees by the Federation as part of a cover-up surrounding the conquest of the SMC. Yuri escapes and slowly rebuilds his crew, ultimately surrendering to Regeinland. The Lugovalian Empire finds a new Void Gate and restarts their invasion of the LMC, causing civil conflict between Federation factions over their response. Yuri spearheads efforts by Regeinland to unite Federation members against rival factions and the Lugovalians. During this period, Yuri discovers an ability to manipulate Flux Sectors and consequently control reality within them. Under Yuri's leadership, the Regeinland-led fleets first establish their military presence by quashing rebellions and civil unrest, then unite the LMC's Federation planets in an assault on the Empire's military which successfully beats them back and forces a peace accord with support from Cico. Ships begin disappearing within Void Gates and planets vanish without explanation, with Adis initially claiming responsibility. Arriving to exact retribution, Yuri encounters Bogd and learns that the disappearances are caused by the Overlords, a god-like species who gifted humanity with their technology and have been repeatedly destroying and recreating the universe.

Yuri is revealed to be an artificial human called an Observer created by the Overlords, explaining his possession of an Epitaph and power over Flux Sectors, with Kira being a Tracker android sent to monitor him. The Void Gates were designed to track and record events for the Overlords to use in a subsequent cycle of creation. The Lugovalian emperor Taranis, an Observer similar to Yuri, started his conquests intending to unite humanity against the Overlords. When Kira attempts to access the Overlords' network and discover their weakness, she is erased and leaves only her android skeleton behind. The Overlords' organic Phage ships begin appearing, destroying large sectors of known space. Yuri learns that the only way to stop the Phages is destroying the one Void Gate that links to the Overlords' realm, located in the original Solar System. Valantin—revealing himself to be a Tracker like Kira—returns to aid Yuri, and ultimately sacrifices himself so Yuri can reach the Solar System. In a final battle, Yuri's fleet holds off the Phage as Taranis sacrifices his ship to destroy the Overlords' Void Gate. A post-credit scene shows Yuri steering his ship into a Flux Sector and using his powers to restore Kira as a human.

== Development ==
Infinite Space was co-developed by PlatinumGames, a company founded by ex-Capcom staff including producer Atsushi Inaba; and Nude Maker, a company founded by former employees of Human Entertainment including director and writer Hifumi Kono. The adult Kono had wanted to create a sweeping science fiction epic since his teens, though he had never imagined being able to do so. The project began when Inaba contacted Kono, having wanted to work with him since the pair's experience developing Steel Battalion. Infinite Space was unusual compared to PlatinumGames's other action-based titles, but Inoue pushed for something out of the ordinary to be included in their library. PlatinumGames oversaw and supported production under Inaba. Nude Maker handled the core programming and creation of initial art assets and scenario, with expansion of aspects such as artwork handled by other external studios. The production was notably supported by Studio Nue.

When publisher Sega presented the proposed budget, Kono felt it was restrictive for a console game, but large for a handheld title. Not wanting to cut anything from the game, he chose to make Infinite Space for the DS. The platform choice was also seen as having the smallest commercial risks compared to home consoles due to the game's scale and mechanics. Kono commented that it proved difficult fitting all the game's content on the DS cartridge. As part of its promotion, Sega announced that the developers were aiming to push the technical limitations of the platform. Similar to Steel Battalion, Kono proposed a dedicated control peripheral for Infinite Space, but PlatinumGames rejected the idea in favor of having the broadest market appeal possible. Kono attributed the successful production to both new tools that helped organise production within the small team, and the dedication of staff involved.

While the gameplay system was uncommon among Japanese titles, the design aim was not to make it complicated. Spaceship customization was present during the early talks between Inoue and Kono, drawing inspiration from playing with action figures as children. Kono felt the crew recruitment system was a necessity, as a large crew was more important to ships than it would have been to a tank or similar customizable vehicles in other games. The customization options also allowed players to complete a game with their "ideal fleet" rather than needing to acquire and upgrade different ships across the campaign. The rock-paper-scissors mechanics of battles were decided upon later. Exploring a ship interior in real-time was considered, but dropped due to the DS's technical limitations. The difficulty curve was not intentionally high, but it was intended that players should learn the systems, and it served as an extension of the narrative featuring an inexperienced youngster going against ruthless veterans. The team experimented with online multiplayer, but due to potential issues and the project's already large scope, these plans were dropped.

=== Scenario and art design ===
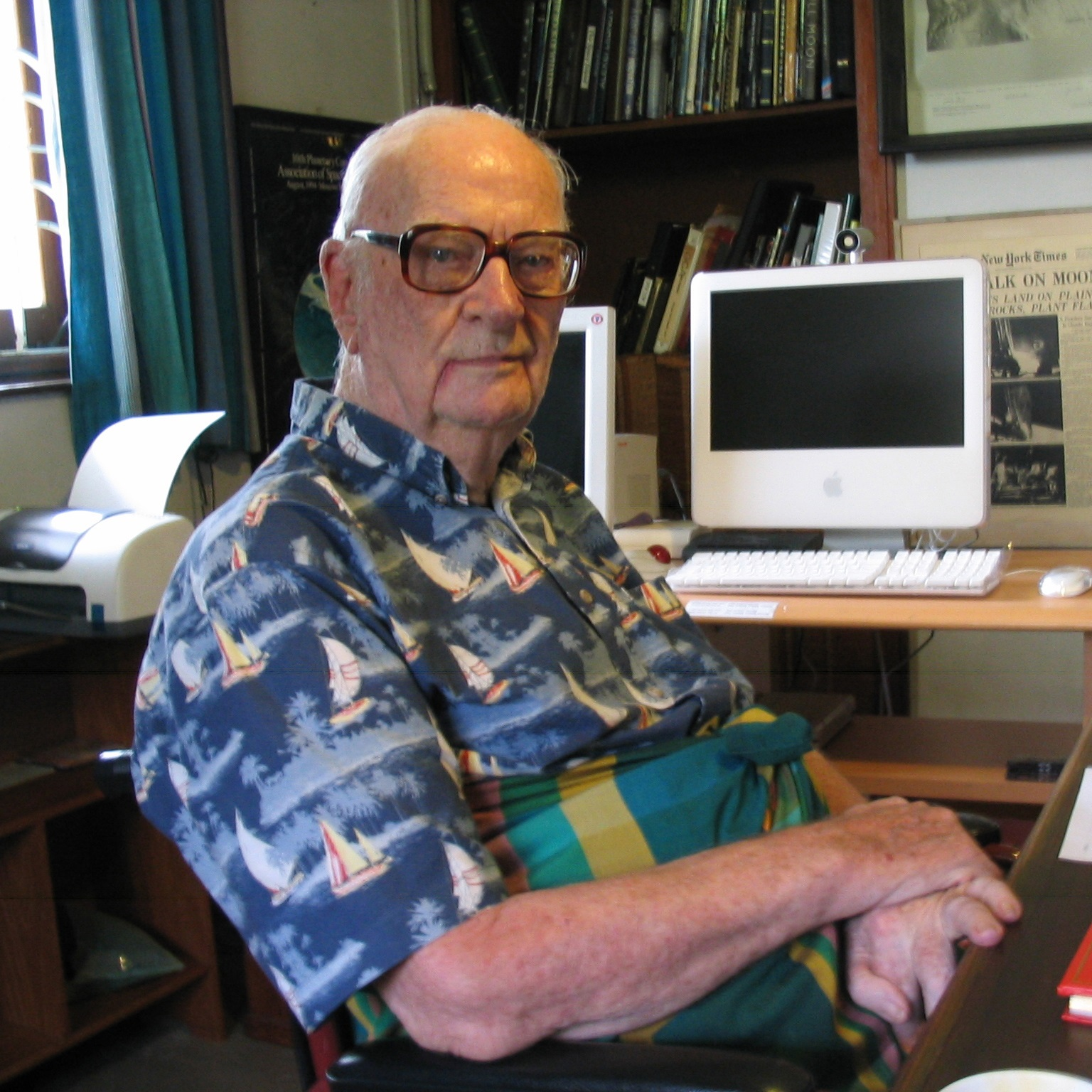
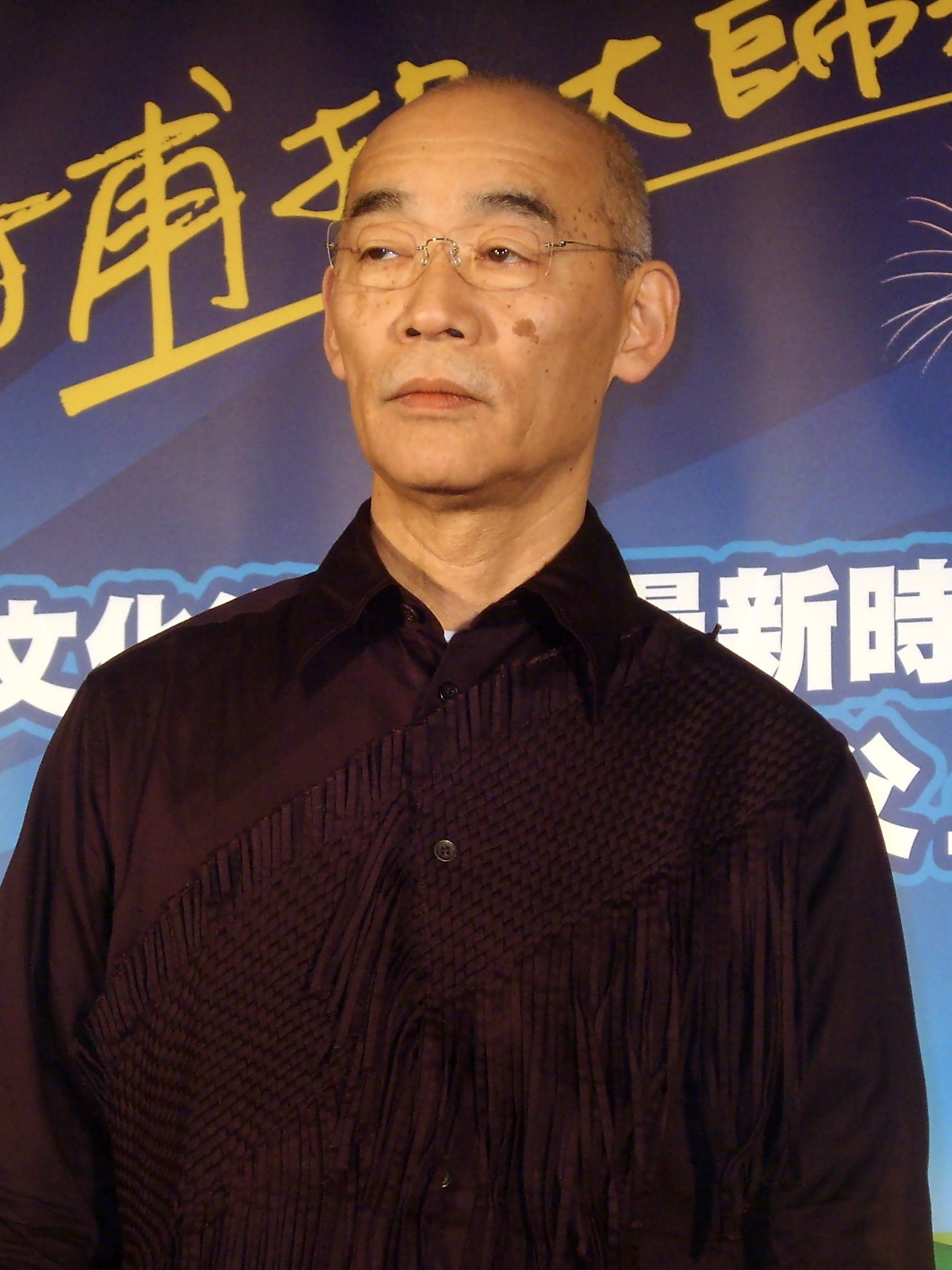
The scenario, written by director Hifumi Kono, drew from the work of multiple science fiction creators including Arthur C. Clarke (left) and Yoshiyuki Tomino (right).

Kono described the scenario as dividing naturally into four parts. The first half of the narrative was a lighter-toned adventure, while the second half leaned more towards adult serious science fiction. Kono created the scenario at the beginning of development, allowing him to carefully plan out revelations and relationships. The main narrative followed the human conflict, with the more esoteric elements either layered over it or appearing as smaller side-stories. In addition, Kono designed the narrative to have a grand scope by using locations across multiple galaxies, contrasting against a trend he noticed for recent science fiction to stay within the Solar System. Looking back on its production, Inoue noted that the scenario kept expanding, increasing the game's ROM size and putting their resources and production schedule under pressure. Kono wanted to include voice acting, but the space limitations of the DS made his desire for full voice acting impractical. Voice acting ended up being limited to in-battle exclamations. While not all planets and galaxies could be visited, Kono took pains to describe different races and factions in-game.

The scenario drew influence from multiple sources. The main influences were science fiction authors Arthur C. Clarke and Greg Egan, and anime creator Yoshiyuki Tomino. In using Clarke, Kono took the themes of the novel Childhood's End and incorporated its perspective through the game's view of humanity from an overarching perspective. Another direct influence was the work of H. P. Lovecraft, particularly the contrast between the vastness of space and small-scale actions of humanity. Other cited influences from both Kono and Inoue include the television series Star Trek and the reimagined Battlestar Galactica; the manga Space Pirate Captain Harlock and Planetes; and the anime Space Battleship Yamato and Space Runaway Ideon.

The character graphics were the first designs to be created, with rough sketches created by Nude Maker staff and then handed to the external artists. Character portraits were created using "dot-like" graphics, allowing for small detailed adjustments where needed. The anime stills used for cutscenes were a choice born of budgetary and hardware constraints. The character and ship designs were created in parallel with the scenario due to time constraints, leading to parts of the scenario being altered in response to the character designs. Due to these changes, many of the minor characters changed roles completely, although their affiliation with different organizations remained intact. The characters were designed by Sawaki Takeyasu and Tatsuro Iwamoto, who had both worked on Ōkami. The ship, mechanical and environmental designs were handled by Kazutaka Miyatake of Studio Nue, Yasushi Yamaguchi, Junji Okubo, Tetsuyaro Shinkaida, Naohiro Washio, Goro Murata, and Mitsuru Yaku.

While incorporating hard science fiction elements, Kono also incorporated anime-inspired characters and events to broaden its appeal. As part of the promotion in Japan, an anime short film was co-produced by studios Gonzo and Production I.G. It was first shown on stage at the 2008 Tokyo Game Show, then released in multiple parts through the game's website. The anime was directed by Yasufumi Soejima. The animation director was Fumitoshi Oizaki, while art direction was handled by Nishino Takashiyo and Yusuke Takeda. It was commissioned by Sega at Inaba's request as he wanted to further express the world of Infinite Space, but knew the DS lacked the hardware to incorporate multiple anime cutscenes. The anime was also published online in English.

=== Music ===
The soundtrack was composed by members of the sound team of Grasshopper Manufacture. The company had previously worked with Nude Maker on the audio design of Steel Battalion. The most notable composer was Masafumi Takada, whose work at Grasshopper Manufacture included Killer7 and No More Heroes. The game was one of Takada's last projects with Grasshopper Manufacture before becoming an independent composer at the end of 2008. The soundtrack was principally composed by Takada and Jun Fukuda, who Kono described as the two composers he trusted the most. Additional music was composed by Etsuko Ichikawa and Yusuke Komori. Kono requested tracks that would express the expansive nature of space, something which proved challenging due to the DS's limited sound capacities. The ending theme "Infinity Route" was performed by Chieko Nishimura.

A two-disc soundtrack album was released on July 29, 2009. It was co-published by Geneon Entertainment and Sega's WaveMaster label. The soundtrack release included an orchestral piece titled "Infinite Space", created by Masamichi Amano and performed by the Tokyo Symphony Orchestra for the promotional anime short.

== Release ==
Infinite Space was announced in May 2008. The announcement came alongside that of PlatinumGames's four-game publishing partnership with Sega; the other titles were MadWorld, Bayonetta, and the then-unannounced Vanquish. At the time, it was known under the title Infinite Line. As part of the publishing partnership, Infinite Space and the other announced IPs are owned by Sega. The title was demoed at TGS 2008. Based on feedback from the demo, adjustments were made to the gameplay speed and an option to skip combat cutscenes was included. They also adjusted the difficulty balance, which Kono admitted gave him trouble during the early levels. A promotional try-out event took place at a gaming store in Akihabara on May 30, 2009. Kono commented that promotion of the title was difficult without spoiling additional details from its second half.

The game released in Japan on June 11, 2009. It was supplemented by a strategy guide released by Enterbrain on July 5; and the Infinite Space Setting Document Collection published by SoftBank Creative on February 1, 2010, containing artwork and developer commentary. Work on the Western version of Infinite Space began shortly before its Japanese release. Aside from the language difference, no content was changed between regional releases. The game released in North America on March 16, 2010. In PAL regions, it released on March 26. While it was the third PlatinumGames title to be released in the West, it was their first release in Japan.

== Reception ==
Reception

Aggregate score
Aggregator	Score
Metacritic	75/100

Review scores
Publication	Score
1Up.com	B
Edge	8/10
Eurogamer	8/10
Famitsu	9/9/8/8 (Note: Each of the four reviewers in Famitsu scored the game on a ten point scale)
Game Informer	8/10
GameSpot	6.5/10
GamesRadar+	4.5/5
GameTrailers	7.8/10
IGN	7/10
NGamer	9/10
PALGN	6.5/10
Pocket Gamer	3/5
RPGamer	4/5

Infinite Space met with "generally favorable" reviews, earning a score of 75 points out of 100 from aggregate website Metacritic based on 46 critic reviews. While critical reception of the game was generally positive, it saw a more mixed reaction from players in both Japan and the West.

Reception to the narrative was generally positive, with praise going to its writing and scope. Japanese gaming magazine Famitsu called the narrative enjoyably complex, with one reviewer noting its setting as "overwhelming". Kat Bailey of 1Up.com noted homages to 1970s Japanese science fiction, while Edge Magazine praised the narrative as "neatly grafted" onto the gameplay systems. Eurogamer's Dan Pearson described the storyline as traditional while praising Yuri's characterization. Matthew Kato of Game Informer called the characters cliche and the story "ordinary", while GamesRadar enjoyed the balance of serious drama and humor. GameSpot's Nathan Meunier found the story predictable, though the characters grew on him. GameTrailers enjoyed the narrative and praised the localization, saying it "carefully balances between violent, humorous, and thought-provoking themes". IGN's Daemon Hatfield highlighted the characters' growth as the main reason to play through more difficult sections. Matthew Castle, writing for Nintendo Gamer, lauded the scale of characters and narrative, praising Yuri as one of the best recent RPG protagonists. Anthony Capone of PALGN cited the narrative as one of the game's positives, and Pocket Gamer's Will Wilson lauded the character interactions and script quality. RPGamer's Mike Moehnke enjoyed the character development, particularly Yuri's growth during the story.

Where mentioned, the graphics saw mixed responses. Kato positively noted the battle sequence graphics. GameTrailers gave praise to the anime stills used for cutscenes, but found the 3D ship models unattractive and faulted the sound design for its poor quality. Hatfield faulted the interface design as unintuitive and frustrating to manage, while Capone faulted both the menu design and audio quality while praising the anime designs. Wilson noted the 3D graphics and sound design as positives that helped create the right atmosphere. Moehnke faulted the lack of animation in battles, and lauded the soundtrack as enjoyable even after extended play.

The gameplay saw general praise for its customization and battle system; a common complaint across regions was high difficulty and a lack of direction. Famitsu praised the customization options and depths of its mechanics. Bailey, while generally positive, noted many obscure mechanics and the need to grind for cash to strengthen ships. Edge praised the customization options, but noted a lack of direction and problems navigating the interface; these sentiments were echoed by Pearson, who also praised the depth of battle mechanics. Kato's main point of praise was the customization systems, as he found the battles less engaging overall. GamesRadar praised the battles, but found several of the associated systems overly complex. Meunier positively noted the blend of combat and customization, but found the melee elements unenjoyable. GameTrailers disliked the ground-based battles, but praised the ship combat and depth of customization options given to players. Hatfield disliked the gameplay during the first few hours due to a lack of flexibility and generally negative about several mechanical choices, while by contrast Castle lauded its systems despite these unintuitive elements. Capone faulted the navigation as too complex, and felt that the prolonged periods between save points undermined enjoyment. Wilson was fairly mixed about the battle system due to recurring frustrations with its combat mechanics, feeling new elements were unlocked too slowly. Moehnke was overall positive despite noting the weak melee options and need for grinding.

=== Sales ===
During the first week following its release in Japan, Infinite Space sold 38,000 units and was the highest selling game in Japan during that period. Sales tracking company Media Create predicted that the game would have a 92% sell-through rate, indicating that it could continue to perform well on the market. By the end of 2009, it was among the top-selling two hundred titles, selling just over 71,400 units. Its early sales success was attributed to its broad appeal in themes, and the fact that it was an "orthodox" DS title of a type becoming rare in the modern market. It ended up selling around 200,000 units worldwide. Later speaking about its low overall sales in Japan, Kono cited the limited manufacture of cartridges due to costs as a factor. Inaba half-jokingly blamed Sega for under-producing the game, resulting in the limited stock quickly selling out worldwide, but more seriously attributed its lack of sales to the bulky scenario's niche appeal.
