= Phenomena (film) =

1985 film by Dario Argento

- Theatrical release poster by Enzo Sciotti
- Directed by: Dario Argento
- Written by: Dario Argento; Franco Ferrini
- Produced by: Dario Argento
- Starring: Jennifer Connelly; Daria Nicolodi; Dalila Di Lazzaro; Patrick Bauchau; Donald Pleasence
- Cinematography: Romano Albani
- Edited by: Franco Fraticelli
- Music by: Goblin
- Production company: DAC Film
- Distributed by: Titanus
- Release date: 31 January 1985 (Italy)
- Running time: 116 minutes
- Country: Italy
- Language: English

Phenomena is a 1985 Italian giallo film produced and directed by Dario Argento, who co-wrote the screenplay with Franco Ferrini. It stars Jennifer Connelly, Daria Nicolodi, Dalila Di Lazzaro, Patrick Bauchau and Donald Pleasence. The plot concerns an American teenage girl (Connelly) at a remote Swiss boarding school who discovers she has psychic powers that allow her to communicate with insects, and uses them to pursue a serial killer who is targeting young girls at and around the school. This film marked Jennifer Connelly's debut in a leading role.

After its release in Italy, Phenomena was purchased for distribution in the United States by New Line Cinema, which excised over 20 minutes of the original cut, releasing it under the alternate title Creepers. This shortened version was also released in the United Kingdom in April 1986.

== Plot ==
After missing a bus in the Zurich countryside, 14-year-old Danish tourist Vera Brandt comes across a cottage and is beheaded by an unseen assailant, who retains her body.

Eight months later, her case is being inspected by forensic entomologist John McGregor and Inspector Rudolf Geiger of the Kantonspolizei Zürich, who note that Vera is the first in a series of murders of young girls, including McGregor's former assistant. Meanwhile, Jennifer Corvino, the daughter of a famous American actor, arrives at the Swiss Richard Wagner Academy for Girls, chaperoned by Frau Brückner, who places her with roommate Sophie.

At night, Jennifer sleepwalks through the academy and witnesses a student being murdered. She flees into the woods, where McGregor's chimpanzee, Inga, finds her and leads her to him. Upon noticing the affection his captive insects have for Jennifer, McGregor comes to believe that she has a telepathic link with them. The following night, the murderer kills Sophie. Jennifer sleepwalks again and is led by a firefly to the scene of Sophie's murder, where she finds a maggot-infested glove. McGregor identifies the maggots as the larvae of Great Sarcophagus flies, which are drawn to decaying human flesh. He theorises that the killer is a necrophile who has been keeping his victims close to him post-mortem.

Later, when the other students taunt Jennifer for her connection to insects, she summons a swarm of flies that covers the entire building, prompting the headmistress to arrange for her transfer to a mental hospital. Jennifer flees to McGregor's home, where he gives her a glass case with a Great Sarcophagus fly to help her find the murderer's lair. The fly leads her to the same cottage Vera had found, but Jennifer finds it unoccupied. Inspector Geiger, who was secretly following Jennifer, talks to the local real estate agent in order to learn the identity of the house's previous occupant. That night, McGregor is murdered in his home in front of Inga.

Jennifer calls her father's lawyer, Morris Shapiro, to arrange for her return to the United States. He alerts Brückner, who offers to let the girl stay at her house overnight. Meanwhile, Geiger's investigation leads him to a mental hospital in Basel, where he learns that a former staff member had been attacked 15 years before by one of the male inmates.

At Brückner's house, Jennifer notices that all the mirrors are covered; Brückner explains that her son cannot stand to see his own reflection. Brückner insists that Jennifer take pills before she goes to bed; when she does so, she becomes sick and, assuming that the pills are poisonous, coughs them up. She attempts to call Morris, but is knocked unconscious by Brückner. Geiger arrives and questions Brückner, who confirms that she had worked at the Basel mental hospital and had been raped. She leads him to the basement and imprisons him.

After waking, Jennifer engineers her escape through the basement. There, she finds Geiger and falls into a pool filled with maggot-infested corpses. Brückner arrives and taunts Jennifer, but Geiger frees himself and beats Brückner while Jennifer escapes. Jennifer finds Brückner's son Patau, the result of the rape by the inmate, who has a hideously deformed face. He chases Jennifer onto a motorboat and tries to kill her with a spear, which perforates the boat's fuel tank and causes a leak. Jennifer summons a swarm of flies that attack Patau, causing him to fall into the water. Jennifer is forced to jump into the water as the leaking petrol ignites, whereupon Patau grabs her, but he is immolated by the flames.

Jennifer reaches the shore just as Morris arrives. A severely injured Brückner decapitates him from behind with a metal sheet and confesses that she murdered McGregor and Geiger to protect her son. Before she can murder Jennifer, Inga appears and kills Brückner with a straight razor in retribution for McGregor's murder. With the ordeal over, Jennifer and Inga embrace.

== Cast ==
- Jennifer Connelly as Jennifer Corvino
- Daria Nicolodi as Frau Brückner
- Fiore Argento as Vera Brandt
- Federica Mastroianni as Sophie
- Fiorenza Tessari as Gisela Sulzer
- Dalila Di Lazzaro as the headmistress
- Patrick Bauchau as Inspector Rudolf Geiger
- Donald Pleasence as Professor John McGregor
- Alberto Cracco as bank manager
- Gaspare Capparoni as Karl
- Mario Donatone as Morris Shapiro
- Davide Marotta as Patau Brückner
- Fulvio Mingozzi as Herr Sulzer
- Francesca Ottaviani as nurse
- Michele Soavi as Kurt, Geiger's assistant
- Franco Trevisi as realtor

== Production ==
=== Writing and casting ===
When I was thinking of Phenomena, I imagined that between 1940 and 1945 there had been a very serious incident, the war, and that the Nazis had won. After thirty-forty years, the people had wiped this dramatic event from their memories and didn't talk about it anymore. In reality though, the Nazis won the war, and life therefore has a totally different vibe, it's a world where the Nazi order won. If the movie is watched attentively, then it is obvious that, from that perspective, whoever made it was working from this principle.

— Dario Argento

Argento became inspired to write and direct Phenomena after hearing a French radio broadcast detailing a murder case that had been solved thanks to the study of insects present on the corpse. Argento subsequently worked with an entomologist in an effort to make the film's use of forensic insects more realistic. He later recalled that the insects used during filming were not trained; instead, the production waited for them to behave in the required manner before capturing the shots. In an interview with La Stampa, Argento said he saw the film as a personal challenge to American cinema. Screenwriter Franco Ferrini stated that, visually, Argento was inspired by Caspar David Friedrich paintings, noting the artist's purely Romantic portrayal of people and nature. Argento later stated that he imagined the film taking place in a world where Nazism had triumphed during World War II.

Originally, Argento wanted Connelly's character to be portrayed as the daughter of Al Pacino, and planned to have photos and video clips of him included in the film. However, Pacino refused to allow this as, according to Argento, he "didn't appreciate telling the story of a daughter he doesn't have".

=== Filming ===
Location filming for Phenomena took place in Switzerland between August and October 1984. The opening sequence was filmed near Urnäsch, in the canton of Appenzell Ausserrhoden, where a house at Kleinwald 1172 served as the setting for the film's opening attack. The nearby waterfall sequence was filmed at the Thur waterfalls in Unterwasser, in the canton of St. Gallen.

The fictional Richard Wagner School was represented by the Villa Wesendonck in Zürich, which now forms part of the Rietberg Museum. The building was undergoing renovation during filming. Additional studio filming took place in Rome.

The film's budget went in excess of six billion lire, largely on account of the insects and arachnids used. Spiders, including black widows, and scorpions were imported from Africa, while flies, grasshoppers and wasps were raised in various parts of Rome. For the scene where Jennifer follows the fly, Argento, recalling a trick learned from his childhood, had a real fly leashed with a nylon string.

The chimpanzee, Tanga, who had previously starred in Bingo Bongo, proved difficult to direct, as Argento wanted to avoid its performance seeming comical. During the film's climax, the hand wielding the straight razor hitting Daria Nicolodi was in fact Tanga's own, which managed to scar her despite the object being blunted. It then proceeded to attack Connelly and bit off part of one of her fingers. In 2008, Connelly stated on Late Night with Conan O'Brien that Tanga continued to act aggressively toward her from that point on, thus necessitating a body double for some scenes. Further problems arose when Tanga escaped during an outdoor scene and did not return for three days until forest rangers attracted it with food.

As with his previous films, Argento's own gloved hands were used during murder scenes.

=== Special effects ===
For the swarming scenes, special effects artist Sergio Stivaletti superimposed slowed-down footage of coffee granules floating down a fish tank over the film shot. Stivaletti also created a mechanical firefly prop for close up shots, but it was rejected by Argento.

For Frau Brückner's son, Stivaletti drew inspiration from photographs he saw of sufferers of Patau syndrome. In a 2015 interview, actor Davide Marotta, who played Brückner's son, recalled the lengthy process of making a mold of his head, and stated that his death scene involved being smeared in glucose before having 40 million insects released on him.

=== Music ===
The original score was composed and performed by Argento regulars Goblin, with two cues reused from their score from Dawn of the Dead (1978), which are faintly heard when the character Sophie watches television in the film. Goblin frontman Claudio Simonetti wrote the film's main theme, which features the solo soprano voice of Pina Magri. Bill Wyman and Simon Boswell also contributed original compositions for the film.

Unlike Argento's previous films, Phenomena adopts a mid-1980s trend of including popular songs in the soundtrack. It also includes heavy metal music by artists like Iron Maiden and Motörhead as well as goth favorites such as Sex Gang Children.

== Release ==
Phenomena was released theatrically in Italy on 31 January 1985 with a 116-minute running time. This version of Phenomena is often referred to as the "integral cut".

A shorter version of the film was prepared for international release that had a 110-minute running time. This version of the film only cuts out minor material from the "integral cut" with most being a few frames at the end and beginning of shots. Phenomena earned 2.7 billion lire at the Italian box office, outgrossing films such as Gremlins, Dune and The Terminator.

=== Distribution ===
In the United States, the film was acquired for distribution by New Line Cinema, who released it on 30 August 1985 under the alternative title Creepers. This version of the film was truncated to 83 minutes, with scenes cut entirely and other scenes being re-ordered. Creepers also had music segue between scenes where previously they had no music and the omission of the song "Locomotive" by Motörhead. Troy Howarth, author of So Deadly, So Perverse: 50 Years of Italian Giallo Films cited Creepers as being the last of Argento's films to receive "any kind of meaningful theatrical release" in the United States. The film was released in the United Kingdom in its shortened cut as Creepers in April 1986.

=== Home media ===
Creepers was released in the United States on VHS and Betamax in 1986 by Media Home Entertainment. This release still had the shorter theatrical running time. By 29 March, Creepers entered Billboard's Top Videocassettes Rentals chart. This chart was compiled from a national sample of retail store rental reports. By 5 April, the release reached number 29 on the charts.

The film was first released on DVD in North America by Anchor Bay Entertainment as Phenomena, where it used the 110-minute version of the film. Synapse Films released the film on Blu-ray in the United States on 15 November 2016, which included the shorter version titled Creepers as well as the 116 and 110 minute versions of Phenomena. Arrow Video released Phenomena in the United Kingdom in 2017 including the integral version, the international cut and the Creepers version. Arrow's Blu-ray was among the top ten top-selling home video releases in the United Kingdom on its initial release. In February 2022, Arrow reissued the film in 4K UHD Blu-ray format in three different limited editions, each featuring alternate artwork; one of the editions, available only through Arrow's online store, features artwork bearing the Creepers title. Synapse Films also reissued a 4K UHD Blu-ray in North America. In 2022, a separate 4K digital restoration by Cinecittà received its world premiere as part of Film at Lincoln Center's retrospective Beware of Dario Argento: A 20-Film Retrospective.

In Italy, Phenomena was released on DVD in 2006 as the fourth instalment of I Maestri della Paura, a 35-part Italian newsstand collection of horror films. Each instalment included a DVD and an accompanying booklet. In Japan, a Blu-ray was released in 2020 that featured a brand-new Japanese dub funded through crowdfunding.

In Germany, a seven-disc collector's edition was released in 2020 which included all three versions of the film, Blu-rays, DVDs, a soundtrack CD and a 168-page book. Previously cut scenes were also given new German dubbing. In France, Les Films du Camélia released a 4K UHD/Blu-ray collector's edition in 2026 featuring Italian and English audio, French subtitles, a presentation by Dario Argento, interviews with Jean-Baptiste Thoret and Luigi Cozzi, and additional behind-the-scenes and music-related material.

== Critical response ==
On the review aggregator website Rotten Tomatoes, 76% of 25 critics' reviews are positive.

=== Contemporary ===
Jon Pareles of The New York Times reviewed the Creepers cut of the film, finding that it "creaks along for its first hour or so, failing to work up any chills" and found the acting poor, writing, "The best acting is by an expressive, resourceful chimpanzee – definitely the year's Best Supporting Primate." Kim Newman of Monthly Film Bulletin said the film contained "astonishingly awful performances" and that the dialogue contained several unintentionally humorous lines, which Newman attributed to a language problem. Newman discussed the film's look and style, opining that "Argento's films have their stylishness to fall back on, but here he is experimenting with a washed-out blue look influenced by Possession that works in short scenes but becomes wearying after a few minutes". Newman commented that Argento "goes for sickness after the manner of Lucio Fulci", noting gross-out scenes involving vomiting and violent deaths of actors portrayed by Argento's daughter and wife. The Guardian declared that Creepers was "Argento at his most throw away" and that the film paled in comparison to earlier efforts such as The Bird with the Crystal Plumage (1970) or Suspiria (1977). Commenting on the acting, the review stated that "Pleasence does his best with the script, Jennifer Connelly doesn't even bother to do battle".

The New York Daily News deemed Creepers "a boring, poorly told exercise in gratuitous nausea and Grand Guignol gore, padded with seemingly interminable stretches of static filler," though they conceded that it "boasts a semi-original premise for a slasher movie." The Times found that the film contained traces of previous Argento films, "But the march of time and commercial success seem to have dulled the director's previous panache: Creepers just drags its feet from one absurdity to the next." The Sunday Times found Creepers "only intermittently frightening" and an audience with "a taste for discreetly revealed schoolgirl thigh and/or insects will not be completely disappointed".

Malcolm Johnson of the Hartford Courant criticized some of the film's special effects, but concluded: "Otherwise, Argento displays his customary skill at horror chic. He plays Old World elegance against horrific sights as electronic scoring and macabre rock songs by Bill Wyman, Iron Maiden, and others give Creepers a loud, mad buzz."

=== Retrospective ===
John Kenneth Muir discussed the film in his overview of horror films from the 1980s, finding Phenomena to be "unusual" as well as "strangely stirring", and that the imagery in the film is "nothing short of amazing, even if the narrative is muddled." Budd Wilkins, writing for Slant Magazine, called the film an "eccentric fable", praosing its "Soaring camerawork, insistently rhythmic editing, and the haunting reverberations of Bill Wyman's "Valley", all of which "combine to provide Phenomena with an almost archetypal opening set piece." Wilkins assigns the film 4½ stars.

== Soundtrack ==
Cinevox released the soundtrack to the film in 1985 on vinyl, which included parts of the film's score and the rock music tracks. A compact disc edition was released by Cinevox in 1987. Enigma Records issued a vinyl release in 1985 bearing the Creepers title in the United States.

In 2018, the complete soundtrack was released for the first time by Waxwork Records on a double LP. It included alternate, bonus, and unused tracks.

=== Track listing ===
1. "Phenomena" – Claudio Simonetti featuring Pina Magri
2. "Flash of the Blade" – Iron Maiden (originally from Powerslave, 1984)
3. "Jennifer" – Goblin
4. "The Quick and the Dead" – Sex Gang Children
5. "You Don't Know Me" – Sex Gang Children
6. "The Wind" – Goblin
7. "Valley" – Bill Wyman and Terry Taylor
8. "Sleepwalking" – Goblin
9. "Locomotive" – Motörhead (originally from No Remorse, 1984)
10. "Jennifer's Friend" – Goblin
11. "The Maggots" – Simon Boswell
12. "The Naked and the Dead" – Sex Gang Children

== Legacy ==
After Phenomena, Daria Nicolodi repudiated the film, labeling it "reactionary" on account of its portrayal of handicapped people, and stated on interview that she would no longer work with her husband Argento. They later divorced, but would work together again two years later on Opera.

The film was a significant influence on the 1995 survival horror video game Clock Tower. Its creator, Hifumi Kono, stated that he drew from Phenomena and Suspiria when developing the game, particularly their use of suspense, pursuit and vulnerable female protagonists. Kono specifically identified Phenomena as the strongest influence on the decision to depict Scissorman as a child.

A novelisation of the film was written by Luigi Cozzi for the horror anthology Terrore profondo in 1997.

In October 2022, it was announced by Titanus' general manager Stefano Bethlen that a sequel set in modern times was jointly under production with the Los Angeles-based film studio The Exchange, with an American director and cast.
