= Clock Tower (series) =

Horror adventure video game series

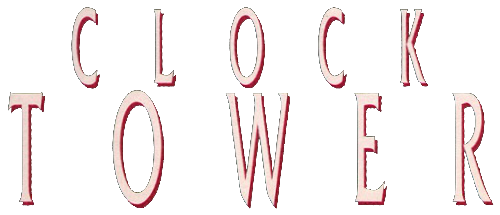
- Genres: Survival horror, point-and-click adventure
- Developers: Human Entertainment; Capcom
- Publishers: Human Entertainment; ASCII Entertainment; Agetec; Capcom; Sunsoft
- Creator: Hifumi Kono
- Platforms: Super Famicom; PlayStation; Windows; WonderSwan; PlayStation 2; Nintendo Switch; PlayStation 4; PlayStation 5; Xbox Series X/S
- First release: Clock Tower; 14 September 1995
- Latest release: Clock Tower: Rewind; 29 October 2024

Clock Tower (Note: Japanese: クロックタワー, Hepburn: Kurokku Tawā) is a point-and-click survival horror video game series created by Hifumi Kono. The series includes four games in total. The first entry, Clock Tower (1995), was developed by Human Entertainment and released on the Super Famicom in Japan. Human Entertainment developed two more entries, Clock Tower (1996) and Clock Tower II: The Struggle Within (1998), which were released on the PlayStation and localized outside Japan. The fourth and final title, Clock Tower 3 (2002), was co-produced by Capcom and Sunsoft for the PlayStation 2. Gameplay in the series generally involves the player hiding and escaping from enemy pursuers without any weapons to defeat them. Scissorman is a reoccurring antagonist and sometimes the sole enemy in the game.

Kono's inspiration for the first Clock Tower title came from watching Italian film director Dario Argento's horror films, especially his film Phenomena (1985). The game began as an experimental project with a low budget and small staff. It sold well enough to prompt a direct sequel which competed with Capcom's Resident Evil (1996). Developer Human Entertainment went out of business in 2000, after which Sunsoft purchased the Clock Tower intellectual property. Together with Capcom, they developed Clock Tower 3 without creator Kono's input which was a critical and commercial failure.

The Clock Tower games have received mixed reviews. They are often praised for their high levels of presentation and horror elements, but criticized for their cumbersome and archaic gameplay. The first game solidified Human Entertainment as a developer and heavily influenced the survival horror genre. Although no Clock Tower titles have been released since 2002, the series did see two spiritual successors. The first was Haunting Ground (2005) for the PlayStation 2, which was similar to Clock Tower 3. The second was NightCry (2016) for Windows, which was directed by Kono and crowdfunded through Kickstarter. A film based on the series was rumored from 2006 to 2011, but never materialized.

== Titles ==
Release timeline
1995	Clock Tower
1996	Clock Tower
1997
1998	II: The Struggle Within
1999–2001
2002	Clock Tower 3
2003–2023
2024	Clock Tower: Rewind

- Clock Tower (1995) is the first entry in the series and was released only in Japan. It was directed by Hifumi Kono and originally released for the Super Famicom. An updated version, titled Clock Tower: The First Fear, was ported to the PlayStation, WonderSwan, and Windows. An enhanced port of the game, Clock Tower: Rewind, was released for eighth and ninth-generation consoles, as well as PC. The game had previously never been officially released outside Japan, although fan translations exist. The story follows Jennifer Simpson, a young girl searching for a way out of a mansion in Norway while evading Scissorman.
- Clock Tower (1996) is the second entry in the series and is known in Japan as Clock Tower 2. The game was released for the PlayStation and Kono reprised his role as director. The story takes place in Norway and follows a variety of characters as they attempt to survive the return of Scissorman and uncover the mystery of his seemingly immortal state.
- Clock Tower II: The Struggle Within (1998) is the third entry and is known in Japan as Clock Tower: Ghost Head. Released on the PlayStation, it is the first entry not directed by Kono and is considered a spin-off in Japan, where it was not a numbered release. The story follows 17-year-old Alyssa Hale who suffers from multiple personality disorder with an alter ego named Mr. Bates.
- Clock Tower 3 (2002) is the fourth entry in the series. Unlike previous entries by Human Entertainment, the title was co-produced by Capcom and Sunsoft and released on the PlayStation 2. The story follows 14-year-old Alyssa Hamilton who is part of a family lineage of female warriors who travel through time to defeat evil spirits.

== Common elements ==
Jennifer struggles with Scissorman while in "panic mode" in the first title, Clock Tower (1995).

The first three games in the Clock Tower series are point-and-click adventure games with survival horror elements. The fourth game is a pure survival horror game and departs from many of the series' classic characteristics. Throughout the series, gameplay is generally centered on hiding and escaping from enemy pursuers without any weapons. Normally, this enemy is Scissorman, a man wielding a pair of shears. When the player character is alarmed or frightened, the game enters "panic mode". During this mode, they become difficult to control, are more prone to tripping or falling, and are more likely to be killed. When not escaping from an enemy, the player explores the environment to solve puzzles and advance the narrative. Most of the titles feature a variety of multiple endings, encouraging repeated playthroughs.

== History and development ==
The first game in the series, Clock Tower (1995), was developed by Human Entertainment with direction led by Hifumi Kono. He was inspired by the works of Italian horror film director Dario Argento, and wanted to create a game in homage to his films. The game borrows many ideas from his 1980s films, and especially from Phenomena (1985). Clock Tower was an experimental project for Human Entertainment and was developed with a small budget and staff. It was released on the Super Famicom on 14 September 1995 in Japan. The game sold well and was later re-released with some gameplay and graphical changes under the title Clock Tower: The First Fear on PlayStation, Windows, and WonderSwan. No versions of the game have been released outside Japan; however, fan translations exist.

Human Entertainment began work on a sequel, Clock Tower (1996), also known as Clock Tower 2 in Japan. With a team of about 30 people, it was their first game to utilize a 3D graphics engine, although team veterans preferred to have used 2D graphics instead. With the announcement of Capcom's Resident Evil (1996) during development, the team was impressed and challenged themselves to create higher quality graphics. ASCII Entertainment marketed Clock Tower in North America as one of the first true horror games for the PlayStation console. It was released in Japan on 13 December 1996, North America on 1 October 1997, and in Europe in February 1998. The game sold close to half a million copies. Kono attributed some of this success to Resident Evil generating interest in horror games.

The third game, Clock Tower II: The Struggle Within, known in Japan as Clock Tower: Ghost Head, was released in Japan in 1998 and North America in 1999. It was the first game in the series not directed by Kono, and released to critical failure. In Japan, the title is considered a spin-off.

Human Entertainment went out of business in 2000, and Sunsoft became the owner of the Clock Tower intellectual property. A new game in the series, Clock Tower 3, was announced in April 2001, with Capcom co-producing it with Sunsoft. Japanese film director Kinji Fukasaku directed the cutscenes. The game was first shown at E3 in May 2002, where a non-playable demo was on show at the Capcom booth. Released in December later that year, Clock Tower 3 was a commercial failure. Capcom had projected sales of at least 450,000, but by the end of 2003, it had only sold 122,022 units. Clock Tower 3's commercial failure is speculated as the reason why Capcom and Sunsoft have not revisited the series since. Kono tried speaking to a publisher to run a reboot or re-release of the series, but they did not agree because they felt horror games were difficult to market.

=== Related games ===
Capcom's 2005 survival horror title Haunting Ground has been called a spiritual successor to the Clock Tower series by fans and critics. The gameplay has been compared heavily to Clock Tower 3, but distinguishes itself by providing the player character with a dog companion which can attack enemies and solve puzzles. Haunting Ground was generally found to be average survival horror fare for the era, but the sexual objectification of the main character, Fiona, has been repeatedly highlighted as one of the game's strongest elements. Critics felt that the game's voyeuristic presentation and gameplay make Fiona appear more fragile, building a disturbing atmosphere. Kono created his own spiritual successor, NightCry (2016), which features similar gameplay to the original Clock Tower games that he directed. The game was crowdfunded through Kickstarter with a $300,000 budget. It received mixed reviews, being cited for bugs and dated gameplay.

== Reception ==
Aggregate review scores
Game	GameRankings	Metacritic
Clock Tower (1995)	-	-
Clock Tower (1996)	72%	-
Clock Tower II: The Struggle Within	52%	49/100
Clock Tower 3	70%	69/100

The Clock Tower series has received mixed critical reception across its history. In retrospective reviews, the first title, Clock Tower (1995), received praise for its haunting atmosphere but was criticized for tedious puzzles and exploration. Despite these criticisms, it is considered instrumental in establishing the survival horror genre and creating a model for future horror games to follow. Its sequel, Clock Tower (1996), was met with mixed reception as well. The horror themes and atmosphere were well-received, but the game's point-and-click gameplay and slow pace were found to be inferior to the growing landscape of action games on the PlayStation, especially Capcom's first Resident Evil title, which was released the same year. The third title, Clock Tower II, was met with unfavorable reviews. Critics heavily criticized the slow point-and-click interface and the flawed trial-and-error gameplay. Clock Tower 3 received similar reviews to the first two titles. The graphics, atmosphere and storyline received positive reviews, but again, the gameplay was a point of criticism. Critics believed the boss fights and repetitive hiding and chasing gameplay mechanics were weak. Scissorman is often compared to Nemesis from Resident Evil 3 because he stalks his victims and disappears and reappears at various intervals throughout the games. He is also often identified as one of the scariest characters in video games because of his unrelenting nature and the difficulty to escape him.

== Film adaptation ==
A film adaption of the Clock Tower series was first announced in June 2006. The film was to be directed by Chilean director Jorge Olguin. Todd Farmer, Jake Wade Wall, and David Coggeshall were set to write the script. In the pitched story based on the plot of the Clock Tower 3 video game, Alyssa Hamilton is called by her mother and told not to return home. After investigating, Alyssa uncovers that she possess a secret power enabling her to destroy evil servants that live off murdered victim's souls. She learns how to wield a weapon to defeat these evil forces. Production was set to begin in December 2006.

Two years later, the film was set to begin production in November 2008 in Los Angeles by another studio. Martin Weisz was set to direct the film, and Brittany Snow would star in it. The film reportedly centers on a troubled psychiatric patient who witnessed her parents die and is constantly plagued by religious imagery. In November 2011, David R. Ellis said that he was directing the film. No news has been announced of the film since, and Ellis died in 2013.
