= Clock Tower (1996 video game) =

1996 video game

- North American cover art
- Developer: Human Entertainment
- Publishers: JP: Human Entertainment; WW: ASCII Entertainment
- Director: Hifumi Kono
- Programmer: Masaki Higuchi
- Artist: Yoichiro Shimazaki
- Composer: Kōji Niikura
- Series: Clock Tower
- Platform: PlayStation
- Release: JP: December 13, 1996; NA: October 10, 1997; EU: February 1998
- Genres: Point-and-click adventure, survival horror
- Mode: Single-player

Clock Tower, known in Japan as Clock Tower 2, (Note: Japanese: クロックタワー2, Hepburn: Kurokku Tawā Sekando; or Clock Tower Second in English) is a point-and-click survival horror video game developed by Human Entertainment and released for the PlayStation in 1996. It is the second game in the Clock Tower series after the original Clock Tower, which was released exclusively in Japan for the Super Famicom one year prior. The story takes place in Norway and follows a variety of characters as they attempt to survive the return of Scissorman and uncover the mystery of his seemingly immortal state. The scenarios encountered and endings vary widely based upon the player's actions.

Director Hifumi Kono was not interested in developing a sequel to the original Clock Tower at first, but was swayed after seeing the technical possibilities of the next-generation consoles. Kono had difficulty in choosing the platform to develop on, but eventually settled for the PlayStation despite its uncertain future. Clock Tower was one of the first games developed by Human Entertainment to utilize a 3D graphics engine. The team felt challenged to create high-quality graphics after being impressed by the visuals of Resident Evil (1996), which was announced during development.

Clock Tower was commercially successful, selling close to half a million copies. Kono attributed some of this success to Resident Evil generating interest in horror games and the success of the PlayStation. Critical reviews of Clock Tower were mixed. The game's horror atmosphere and storyline were praised, although most other aspects were found to be mediocre. Most of the negative critique was directed towards the game's slow pace, which was compared unfavorably to other PlayStation games of the era, particularly the more action-oriented and fast-paced Resident Evil. These factors influenced some critics to recommend Clock Tower purely for point-and-click adventure fans.

== Gameplay ==
Clock Tower is a point-and-click adventure game with 3D graphics. The player may use a PlayStation controller or mouse to move the cursor on the screen. The cursor changes shape when placed over certain objects, which the player can click to interact with. Clicking on any location guides the player character in that direction. Moving the cursor to the top of the screen reveals the player's inventory. Clicking on an item and then clicking on an object on the screen uses the item on that object or in that location. Some items such as keys are used automatically when clicked.

Jennifer is directed to examine a computer after the player clicked on it.

The player character has three levels of strength. The strength level is indicated by the cursor which will either be white, flashing yellow, or red. Strength will decrease after extreme actions or being attacked by the game's enemy, Scissorman, and recovers with time. When the character's life is being threatened, the cursor will blink red, indicating panic mode. If the character is being chased, click points are only effective on objects that will make Scissorman retreat. In escape mode, actions do not lower strength and recovery is suspended. This mode stays active until Scissorman is somehow forced to retreat. If the player's strength reaches zero, then it is game over and the player must continue from the last room they entered with one level of strength.

The game features four scenarios including the prologue. The actions during the prologue determine who will be the central character in the story, either Jennifer Simpson or Helen Maxwell. The scenarios and player characters that follow are determined by the player's actions. There are five different endings per heroine depending on how the scenarios progress. After each scenario is a save screen and an intermission mode that allows the player to explore without the threat of Scissorman. During the intermission, the player can have conversations with various characters. The next scenario begins after the required conditions of the intermission are met.

== Plot ==
After the events of the original Clock Tower, central protagonist Jennifer Simpson was adopted by Helen Maxwell, an assistant professor of criminal psychology in Oslo, Norway. She begins undergoing treatment at a university research building in order to learn more about the Scissorman murder case at Barrows Mansion and help her cope with her trauma. Over a year has passed, and now a series of brutal murders have made headline news. It appears that the Scissorman has returned. Having heard the details of Jennifer's original encounters with the Scissorman, Helen begins searching for information that could put an end to the seemingly immortal killer. The scenarios that follow, including the player characters and settings, are vastly different depending on player actions throughout the game.

The first chapter places the player in control of either Jennifer or Helen, escaping from Scissorman within the university research building. The second chapter will have the player retrieve the Demon Idol, a clue to the murder investigation. The scenario in which the idol is retrieved can change depending on choices made by the player earlier. Helen may search for it within the city library, or reporter Nolan Campbell or detective Stan Gotts will search for it in the home of a Barrows family butler. The final chapter occurs at Barrows Castle, putting the player in control of the same character they controlled in chapter one. Jennifer or Helen must use the Demon Idol to open a vortex in the castle basement and destroy Scissorman. Depending on the narrative followed and choices made along the way, ten different endings can be seen.

== Development ==
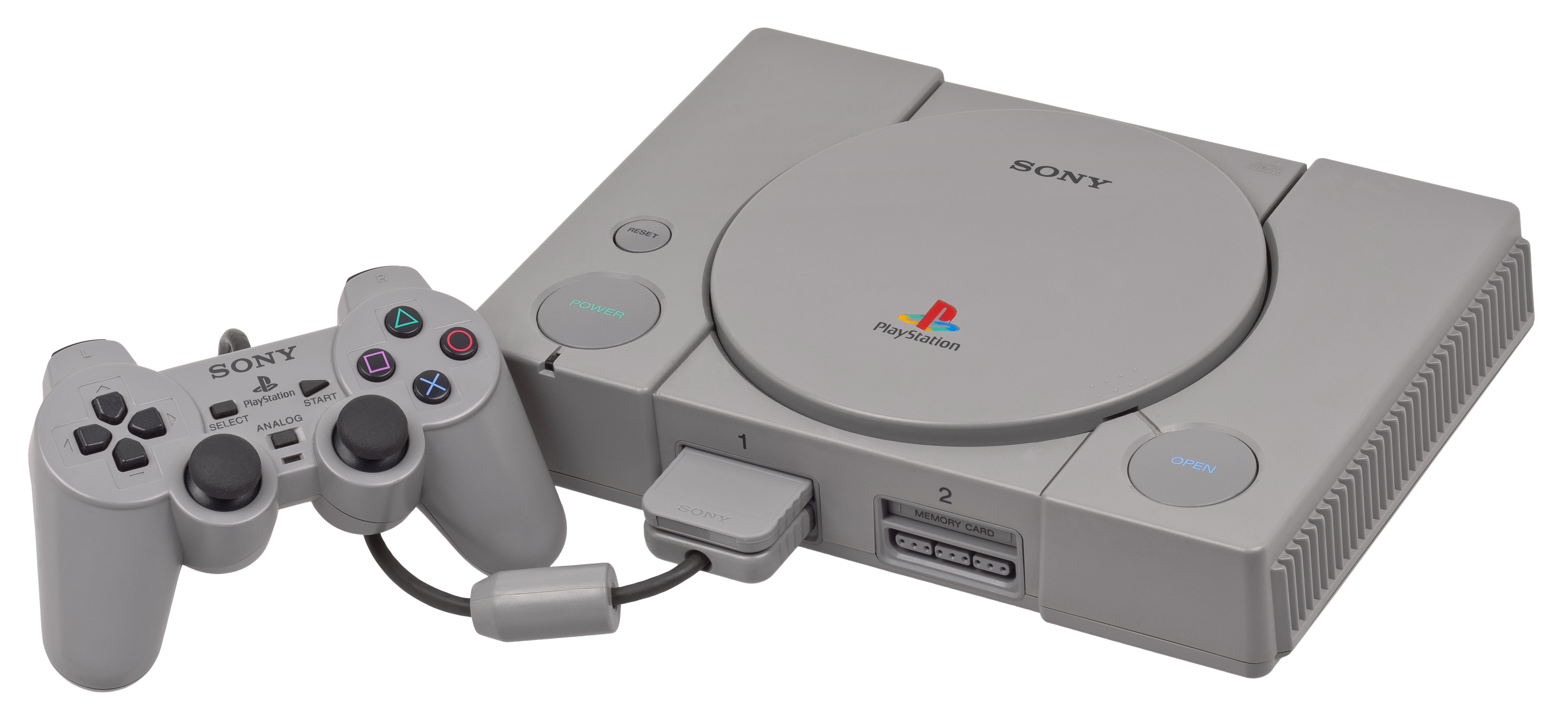
Hifumi Kono chose to develop Clock Tower for the PlayStation despite its uncertain future.

Clock Tower was developed by a team of about 30 people and was the first game at Human Entertainment to utilize a 3D graphics engine, although team veterans preferred to have used 2D graphics instead. At first, director Hifumi Kono was not interested in working on a sequel to the first Clock Tower, but after seeing the technical possibilities with newly released hardware of the time, he agreed. For Kono, one of the most difficult parts of developing Clock Tower was choosing the platform. At the time, the PlayStation and Sega Saturn were already on the market. The Saturn was seen as an icon of next-generation gaming with games like Virtua Fighter (1994). The PlayStation was new to the industry, and despite having a preliminary lead in popularity over the Saturn, its future was uncertain. Meanwhile, the Nintendo 64 was scheduled to arrive on the market soon, coming off the success of the Super Nintendo. Kono eventually settled on the PlayStation, and in retrospect considers it the best choice he could have made since the console's future success helped Clock Tower sell better than expected.

Capcom's Resident Evil (1996) was announced during development. Since it was also a horror game and the visuals were impressive, the team challenged themselves to develop higher-quality graphics and outshine Resident Evil. According to Kono, Clock Tower was developed with a "material comes first" mindset, as opposed to the "game system" given priority with the "material" superimposed on top. The team used 3D graphics and extensive animation as they sought to portray murders as real as possible in both normal and surreal settings. Kono was pleased with their 3D engine, as it allowed him to use camera angles effectively. The music was composed with a theme of "noise and silence", placing sounds in obscure places and not playing sound when there should be some.

== Release ==
ASCII Entertainment marketed Clock Tower as one of the first "true" horror games for the PlayStation console, and claimed it had the most terrifying story ever in a video game. It was released in Japan on December 13, 1996, North America on October 10, 1997, and finally in Europe in February 1998. Since the release date was close to that of the horror game Enemy Zero (1996) for the Sega Saturn, video game stores in Japan laid out their racks as if a rivalry existed between the two horror games.

The game sold close to half a million copies and was successful enough for Human that each staff member received a ¥100,000 bonus. Kono attributed some of this success to Resident Evil generating interest in horror games and the success of the PlayStation console. In Japan, Clock Tower 2 sold well enough to get a discounted release under "The Best" banner on March 19, 1998. Clock Tower was also re-released digitally on the PlayStation Network on February 22, 2012 exclusively in Japan.

== Reception ==
Reception

Aggregate score
Aggregator	Score
GameRankings	72%

Review scores
Publication	Score
AllGame	2.5/5
Electronic Gaming Monthly	8.5/10, 8/10, 8/10, 6/10
Famitsu	8/10, 7/10; 8/10, 7/10
GameSpot	5.8/10
IGN	5.5/10
Next Generation	4/5
Official U.S. PlayStation Magazine	3/5
Gamezilla	84/100

Clock Tower holds a score of 72% on rating aggregator GameRankings. The atmosphere, storyline, and full-motion video cinematics were generally well received. The game's horror themes were praised, with GameSpot's Glenn Rubenstein stating that it "truly feels like an interactive horror film." Mark Skorupa of Gamezilla compared Scissorman favorably to slasher film villains such as Freddy Krueger and Michael Myers, and declared Clock Tower's atmosphere to rival that of any horror movie ever made. Critics particularly credited the game's strong tension to the appearance of a musical theme whenever Scissorman approaches.

Although the point-and-click interface was well received, the game's pace was overwhelmingly found to be slow. Both Rubenstein and IGN's Jaz Rignall compared the game less favorably to more fast-paced and action oriented games on the PlayStation, including Resident Evil. Shawn Smith of Electronic Gaming Monthly, however, asserted that "there are plenty of instances in Clock Tower that'll keep you on the edge of your seat—more so than Resident Evil in my estimation," and Next Generation, noting particularly the tension created by the gameplay mechanics involved when trying to elude Scissorman, similarly concluded, "Even Resident Evil, with its focus on shooting things, can't deliver the creepy feeling Clock Tower does." Critics recommended the game to players looking for slow-paced point-and-click adventure games, with Rignall stating that "for the vast majority of PSX players out there...buying a point and click adventure is simply not even a consideration," when compared to the rest of the PlayStation's library. GamePro recommended the game to patient gamers looking for a challenge with respect to the complex storyline and puzzles. (Note: GamePro provided scores of 4.0 out of 5 for graphics, 3.0 for sound, 4.0 for control, and 3.5 for fun factor.) The multiple endings feature was noted for adding replay value and interactivity to the story, but some critics found that the puzzles can be excessively difficult.

In 2006, GameTrailers placed Clock Tower at #10 on their "Top Ten Scariest Games" list. X-Play ranked it as #8 on their "Top 10 Scariest Games".
