= Clock Tower 3 =

2002 survival horror video game

- North American box art
- Developers: Capcom; Sunsoft
- Publisher: Capcom
- Directors: Kinji Fukasaku; Tomoshi Sadamoto
- Producer: Tatsuya Minami
- Programmer: Masahiro Imaizumi
- Artist: Keita Amemiya
- Writers: Noboru Sugimura; Hiromichi Nakamoto; Yosuke Hirano
- Composer: Cozy Kubo
- Series: Clock Tower
- Platform: PlayStation 2
- Release: JP: December 12, 2002; NA: March 18, 2003; EU: June 27, 2003
- Genre: Survival horror
- Mode: Single-player

Clock Tower 3 (Note: Japanese: クロックタワー3, Hepburn: Kurokku Tawā Surī) is a survival horror video game co-produced by Capcom and Sunsoft for the PlayStation 2. Released in 2002, it is the fourth installment in the Clock Tower series, and the only video game directed by Japanese film director Kinji Fukasaku. The plot and characters have very little relation to the previous Clock Tower games. The story follows 14-year-old Alyssa Hamilton who is part of a family lineage of female warriors who travel through time to defeat evil spirits. Alyssa travels from her time in 2003 London to the 1940s and 1960s in order to defeat these "Entities" and bring peace to troubled souls.

As opposed to the point-and-click gameplay used in the previous games, Clock Tower 3 is the first game in the series to incorporate direct control over the protagonist. Alyssa is given no weapon for the majority of the game, and must evade and hide from her pursuers. These enemies, known as "Subordinates", are fought at the end of each level, during which Alyssa is armed with a longbow. The game received mixed reviews and was a commercial failure, selling considerably less than anticipated. The presentation, writing, and graphics were positively received, with many critics praising the cutscenes and Fukasaku's direction. However, the gameplay was criticized for its repetitive mechanics, and the game itself was felt to be too short.

== Gameplay ==
Clock Tower 3 is a survival horror game played from a fixed third-person camera perspective in which players control 14-year-old school girl Alyssa Hamilton. Clock Tower 3 is the first game in the series to incorporate direct control over the protagonist, as opposed to the point-and-click gameplay used in the previous games. To progress through the game, the player must find items to unlock new areas, solve puzzles, and flee and hide from enemies ("Subordinates"). Eventually, each Subordinate must be defeated in battle. Throughout each level, the player also encounters the spirits of innocent people slain by the Subordinates. These spirits will attack Alyssa if she approaches them. In order to pacify them, an item of sentimental value must be found and returned to the spirit's corpse.

Alyssa is given no weaponry during the majority of the game, other than a limited supply of holy water, which can be used to temporarily stun pursuing Subordinates. Within each level, the Subordinate can appear in any location after a set period of time, but also randomly or if Alyssa makes noise. They also appear in certain set locations. When one appears, it immediately begins to chase Alyssa, attempting to kill her. The player must either hide from or evade it. Evasion can only be accomplished in certain places, and each evasion point can only be used once. Using an evasion point does not kill the Subordinate, but instead renders them unconscious for a set amount of time. The primary means of eluding one, however, is by hiding. There are multiple hiding points throughout each level, and each one can be used multiple times. However, hiding places are ineffective if the Subordinate sees Alyssa enter them.

Alyssa stumbles as she runs away from Sledgehammer in "Panic mode".

Throughout most of the game, Alyssa has a "Panic Meter" visible on screen. If she is scared by a Subordinate, attacked by a spirit or simply frightened by her surroundings, the meter will begin to rise. If it fills, she enters "Panic mode". In this state, the screen starts flashing, Alyssa becomes difficult to control and begins stumbling and falling over. She is also unable to use holy water and cannot enter hiding spots. After a few seconds, she will momentarily freeze, covering her ears. Panic mode only lasts for a certain amount of time, and its duration can be reduced by using "Lavender water". However, if she is hit by a Subordinate while in Panic mode, she will die instantly.

After the majority of each level has played out, Alyssa must confront the Subordinate who has been chasing her. At this point, her holy water bottle transforms into a longbow, allowing her to fight back. Each battle is confined to a single area, and both Alyssa and the Subordinate have onscreen life bars. During the fight, Alyssa must dodge attacks while firing arrows. In order to inflict any real damage, she must power-up her attacks. However, while powering-up, Alyssa cannot move or re-adjust her aim. This leaves her vulnerable to attacks, and makes it possible for her enemy to move out of her line of sight. A fully powered-up shot will tether the Subordinate to the ground. If it is transfixed with multiple powered-up shots, Alyssa can perform a highly damaging "Super attack", killing or severely wounding it.

== Plot ==
In London in 2003, 14-year-old Alyssa Hamilton, sent to a boarding school by her mother Nancy after the disappearance of her grandfather Dick three years earlier, receives a letter from her mother telling her to go into hiding until after her fifteenth birthday. Alarmed, Alyssa decides to go against her mother's wishes and returns to their boarding house where she meets the mysterious Dark Gentleman but no sign of her mother. While searching for her, Alyssa suddenly hears piano music from an unknown source and is transported back in time to the London streets during World War II.

She enters a tailor shop where she witnesses the murder of a young girl by a man wielding a sledgehammer. Eventually, Alyssa is able to piece together what happened: May Norton, a 12-year-old pianist, was killed on Christmas Eve 1942 by Sledgehammer, a stonecutter who went on a killing spree before being caught and executed. Alyssa comes to realise that she must free May's spirit, which is trapped on Earth, by giving her her father's pocket watch. On her way to do so, she is confronted by Sledgehammer, whom she destroys. She then gives the watch to May's spirit, reuniting her with her father. At that moment, Alyssa faints and wakes up back in the boarding house. She explores the house further with her friend, Dennis Owen, and learns more about her past: the girls in her family are known as "Rooders", young women with supernatural powers. Rooders are the sworn enemies of "Entities", beings which can infect innocent humans and drive them to acts of murder, at which point the human becomes a "Subordinate". Rooder powers peak at the age of fifteen, and wane afterward, disappearing completely by the age of twenty.

Alyssa fights Corroder in boss mode. She has tethered him twice, but three tethers are necessary to use the Super Attack.

Alyssa then travels to the 1960s, where she enters the house of Dorothy Rand, a blind elderly woman and her son, Albert, and sees them murdered by a man known as Corroder, who throws them into a vat of acid. Alyssa destroys Corroder, and returns a lost shawl to Dorothy's spirit, freeing both herself and Albert. She then returns to the present, where the Dark Gentleman congratulates her on killing two Subordinates. He sends her to the top of a massive clock tower where he tells her that when her fifteenth birthday arrives they will be united for eternity. He also tells her that her mother is dead. When she refuses to believe him, he flings her from the tower. Regaining consciousness in a sewer system, she is forced to confront another Subordinate, Chopper. She defeats him, but fails to kill him and is sent to a graveyard. She then learns of the "Ritual of Engagement"; if a human wishes to become an Entity, they must remove the heart of a Rooder to whom they are related on her fifteenth birthday and drink her blood. Eventually, Alyssa fights Chopper again and is able to destroy him.

Dennis arrives, and he and Alyssa go to an abandoned hospital where they encounter the twins, Scissorman and Scissorwoman, who have lured them there to kidnap Dennis. Alyssa is transported to a castle, where she witnesses Dick reciting an incantation. She learns that Dick was aware of the Ritual of Engagement and had discovered that Lord Burroughs, his ancestor and the castle owner, also knew about it. Dick invites Burroughs' spirit into his body to complete the Ritual to become an Entity, and turns into the Dark Gentleman. Meanwhile, Alyssa rescues Dennis by killing the twins, Burroughs' executioners. She is told by the Dark Gentleman to come to the top of the tower to save Nancy's soul. At the tower, the Dark Gentleman captures Alyssa, transforms into Lord Burroughs and starts the Ritual. However, Dennis interrupts, giving Alyssa the chance to fight back. With the remaining Rooder power of Nancy's spirit, Alyssa defeats Burroughs and reunites with her mother's spirit before the tower collapses. She wakes up in a field, where she embraces Dennis and tells her mother that they made it.

== Development ==
After Human Entertainment went out of business in 2000, Sunsoft became the sole owner of the Clock Tower intellectual property. In April 2001, Capcom announced to bring Clock Tower 3 to the PlayStation 2 and co-producing the game with Sunsoft. Japanese film director Kinji Fukasaku directed the cutscenes, Keita Amemiya was in charge of character designs, Noboru Sugimura was writing the scenario, and Kouji 'Cozy' Kubo was composing the music. At the time of the announcement, the game was still in the casting phase; over two hundred actresses had auditioned for the motion capture of Alyssa. In addition to the motion capture cast, two separate groups of voice actors were hired for the English and Japanese versions. Minami, who previously worked with Fukasaku in Battle Royale, modeled for Alyssa. The game was first shown at E3 in May 2002, where a non-playable demo was on show at the Capcom booth.

== Release ==
Clock Tower 3 was released in Japan on December 12, 2002. Commercially, the game was a failure. Capcom had projected sales of at least 450,000, but the game fell considerably short of that number. By the end of 2002, it had sold 78,961 units, making it the 151st-highest-selling game in Japan across all systems. In 2003, it sold a further 43,061 units, bringing its total to only 122,022 units sold.

== Reception ==
Reception

Aggregate score
Aggregator	Score
Metacritic	69/100

Review scores
Publication	Score
Eurogamer	6/10
Famitsu	8/10, 9/10, 8/10, 8/10
GameRevolution	C
GameSpot	7.3/10
GameSpy	2/5
IGN	7.7/10
Official U.S. PlayStation Magazine	3/5

Clock Tower 3 received "mixed or average reviews", with an aggregate score of 69 out of 100 on Metacritic, based on 28 reviews.

The game's presentation was strongly praised, with many pointing out the excellent cinematic style brought together by a strong script and well-directed cutscenes. GameSpy's Alan Pavlacka felt the script was the game's strongest point, and wrote that the "excellent cinema scenes" and "distinct visual style" also contributed to the high-quality presentation. The graphics and atmosphere were also well received. IGN's Jeremy Dunham noted that "Clock Tower 3 successfully captur[es] the dirty, musty look of England's serial killer underworld...[it] is straight out of a Mary Shelley novel". The cutscene direction from Kinji Fukasaku was positively noted, with Eurogamer's Kristan Reed calling the cutscenes "exceptionally well realised". The camerawork and scariness of the game were both lauded and criticized.

While the presentation was received positively, the gameplay received criticism from multiple reviews. More specifically, the boss fights and repetitive hiding and chasing gameplay mechanics were cited as weak. GameSpot's Brad Shoemaker argued the cinematic portions were underpinned by the gameplay, believing that players would more likely want to finish the game for its storyline than the fun they'll have playing it. Game Revolution's AA White wrote that "Clock Tower 3 is ultimately one of those games whose cinemas are more interesting than the actual gameplay and from a gamer's standpoint, that's never a good thing". Critics also agreed that the game felt too short.
