= Nude Maker =

Japanese video game developer

Nude Maker Co., Ltd.
- Company type: Public
- Industry: Video games
- Headquarters: Tokyo, Japan
- Key people: Hifumi Kono (CEO, director); Masafumi Nukita (designer)
- Products: Infinite Space; NightCry; Steel Battalion series
- Website: nudemaker.jp

Nude Maker Co., Ltd. (Japanese: 株式会社ヌードメーカー, Hepburn: Kabushiki Gaisha Nūdo Mēkā) is a Japanese video game developer based in Tokyo, Japan. The company is composed mostly of former members of Human Entertainment, including Kono Hifumi, who directed the first two titles in the Clock Tower series of horror games. Nude Maker has been contracted by companies including Capcom, Grasshopper Manufacture, PlatinumGames, Sega, and Konami. It also released several games for iOS and Android, including Swan Song, Zombie Crash (ゾンビ・クラッシュ) and Demon's Crane (デモンズ・クレーン).

== Games developed ==
Year	Title	Publisher	Platform(s)	Notes
2002	Steel Battalion	Capcom	Xbox	Co-developed with Capcom Production Studio 4
2003	Shin Mikagura Shōjo Tanteidan	ELF Corporation	Windows	—N/a
2004	Steel Battalion: Line of Contact	Capcom	Xbox	Co-developed with Capcom Production Studio 4
2006	AV King	ELF Corporation	Windows	—N/a
2009	Infinite Space	Sega	Nintendo DS	Co-developed with PlatinumGames
2011	Terror of the Stratus	Konami	PlayStation Portable	—N/a
2016	NightCry	Playism	Windows, PlayStation Vita	—N/a
