= Nakajima Satoru F-1 Hero GB World Championship '91 =

1991 video game

F-1 Hero GB World Championship '91
- Cover art
- Developer(s): Natsu System
- Publisher(s): Varie
- Composer(s): Yusuke Takahama
- Series: Satoru Nakajima Formula One
- Platform(s): Game Boy
- Release: JP: December 27, 1991
- Genre(s): Formula One racing
- Mode(s): Single-player, multiplayer

Satoru Nakajima F-1 Hero GB World Championship '91 (中嶋悟監修F-1ヒーローGBワールドチャンピオンシップ'91, Nakashima Satoshi Kanshuu Uebu-Wan Hīrō Gēmu Bōi Wārudo Chanpionshippu Nintī Wan) is a 1991 Japan-exclusive Game Boy Formula One video game published by Varie, endorsed by Satoru Nakajima, who was the first full-time Japanese racer in the history of Formula One. Apart from Nakajima, the actual names of the drivers are not used due to licensing arrangements.

There are sixteen rounds and eight difficulty levels. Each level has a special rival to beat. The game structure has few similarities with F-1 Race (Game Boy).

== Levels/Rivals ==
Screenshot showing the gameplay

- Level 1: (Japan) A. Susuki (Aguri Suzuki)
- Level 2: (France) J. Arezi (Jean Alesi)
- Level 3: (Austria) G. Bergir (Gerhard Berger)
- Level 4: (Brazil) N. Pique (Nelson Piquet)
- Level 5: (United Kingdom) N. Mansena (Nigel Mansell)
- Level 6: (France) A. Brost (Alain Prost)
- Level 7: (Brazil) A. Zenna (Ayrton Senna)
- Level 8: (Japan) S. Nakajima

== Sequel ==
A sequel was released in the following year: Nakajima Satoru: F-1 Hero GB '92: The Graded Driver. This game would be published by Ubisoft in North America and Europe as F1 Pole Position, otherwise unrelated to the SNES game of the same name.

== Related video games ==
=== Sponsored ===
- Nakajima Satoru: F-1 Hero (Family Computer - 1988)
- Nakajima Satoru F-1 Hero 2 (Family Computer - 1991)
- F1 Grand Prix: Nakajima Satoru (Sega Mega Drive - 1991)
- F-1 Hero MD (Sega Mega Drive - 1992)
- F1 Super License: Nakajima Satoru (Sega Mega Drive - 1992)
- Nakajima Satoru Kanshuu - F-1 Hero GB '92 - The Graded Driver (Game Boy - 1992)
- Nakajima Satoru Super F-1 Hero (Super Famicom - 1992)
- Nakajima Satoru F-1 Hero '94 (Super Famicom - 1994)
- Colin McRae Rally (European cartridge version for the NES)

=== Appeared in ===
- F-1 Pilot (cover) (PC Engine)
- F1 Circus MD (Sega Mega Drive)
- Fastest 1 (Sega Mega Drive) as S. Inakajima
- Formula One: Built to Win (Nintendo Entertainment System) as S.Nakazima
- Human Grand Prix II (Super Famicom)
- Human Grand Prix III: F1 Triple Battle (Super Famicom)
- Human Grand Prix IV: F1 Dream Battle (Super Famicom)
