= Nakajima Satoru Kanshū F1 Grand Prix =

1991 video game

- Cover art
- Developer: Varie
- Publisher: Varie
- Composer: Yusuke Takahama
- Series: Satoru Nakajima Formula One
- Platform: Sega Mega Drive
- Release: JP: December 20, 1991
- Genre: Formula One racing
- Mode: Single-player

Nakajima Satoru Kanshū F1 Grand Prix (中嶋悟監修 Ｆ１ ＧＲＡＮＤ ＰＲＩＸ; "Supervisor Satoru Nakajima F1 Grand Prix") is a 1991 Sega Mega Drive Formula One video game based on the career of Satoru Nakajima, who was the first full-time Japanese racer in the history of Formula One. This is the third video game collaboration between Nakajima and Varie, following Nakajima Satoru F-1 Hero and Nakajima Satoru F-1 Hero 2 for the Famicom. The entire 1991 Formula One season can be re-enacted with any of the notable contenders from the prestigious Formula One racing organization.

== Gameplay ==
=== General gameplay ===
The action is viewed from the top and practice sessions can be done before actually racing. Player's name is entered using ASCII letters that are traditionally used for the English language, but the options and track details are in Japanese and literacy is required in order to understand the rules and principles of the game.

This graphic sequence depicts pit activity.

In the season mode, the player makes up the last name of his character. He must audition for a team and must qualify for all of his races on time. If the player fails to qualify for a race, he automatically receives zero points and sees a picture of himself looking at the night time sky. Each teams has requirements and if they are not met, then the player is fired from the racing team. Depending on how good a player qualifies in the test teack (known in the game as Auto Police), either many or few teams will be knocking on the player's metaphorical door. Different teams have different requirements in order to stay employed. Unlike its sequel F1 Super License: Nakajima Satoru, going to the pit stop is needed to do repairs on the car. Repairing the car can either be set to automatic or manual on the setup menu.

Transmission can also be shifted from manual transmission to automatic transmission, but the player still needs to shift from neutral to first gear even while in automatic transmission, like in most Formula One games. The maximum number of laps that can be attempted is five. The five-lap rules applies to practice, qualifying, in addition to the actual race itself.

=== F1 Season Drivers ===
- (United States) Eddie Chemer (Eddie Cheever)
- (Italy) Ivan Capella (Ivan Capelli)
- (United Kingdom) Jonatan Pulmer (Jonathan Palmer)
- (United Kingdom) Derec Warwich (Derek Warwick)
- (Italy) Michele Alboreta (Michele Alboreto) (Level 1)
- (Belgium) Tierry Bietsen (Thierry Boutsen) (Level 2)
- (Italy) Alesandro Nannimi (Alessandro Nannini) (Level 3)
- (United Kingdom) Nigel Manselo (Nigel Mansell) (Level 4)
- (Brazil) Nelson Pequet (Nelson Piquet) (Level 5)
- (Austria) Gelgard Gerger (Gerhard Berger) (Level 6)
- (Brazil) Airton Zenna (Ayrton Senna) (Level 7)
- (France) Alain Brost (Alain Prost) (Level 8)
- (Japan) Satoru Nakajima (Level 9)

=== F1 Constructors ===
Honta (Honda) (4-speed manual transmission)
Fast in slow corners, then has great acceleration in second, third and fourth. It is the game's most competitive car, but the only drawback is that it fails to start.
Perrari (Ferrari) (automatic transmission)
This car is competitive, it only has the advantage when there is fast cornering. The car has automatic transmission and is easy to manage.
Muken (Mugen) (4-speed manual transmission)
It is a medium-fast speed car and has high speed, but its acceleration is different. The rest is all balanced and decent. This car is the ace in medium-fast or medium-slow curves.
Suharu (Subaru) (4-speed manual transmission)
It is the game's car, but it fails on acceleration and speed. The player doesn't have an advantage in anything. In addition, the Suharu is easy to move forward.

=== Obtaining the points ===
- First place = 5 points
- Second place = 4 points
- Third place = 3 points
- Fourth place = 2 points
- Fifth place = 1 points
- Sixth place or below = no points

== See also ==
- Nakajima Satoru Super F-1 Hero, the game that Satoru Nakajima endorsed for the Super Famicom
- Satoru Nakajima F-1 Hero GB World Championship '91, the game that Satoru Nakajima endorsed for the Game Boy
