= F1 Pole Position =

F1 Pole Position may refer to:

- F1 Pole Position (video game), a 1992 Super Nintendo Entertainment System racing game
- F1 Pole Position (Game Boy), a 1993 Game Boy racing game released
- F1 Pole Position 64, a 1997 Nintendo 64 racing video game
- Pole Position (video game), a 1982 racing video game
- Pole Position II, a 1983 sequel to Pole Position
