= The Conveni 2 =

1997 video game

- PlayStation box art
- Developer: Masterpiece
- Publisher: Human Entertainment
- Series: The Conveni
- Platforms: PlayStation, Sega Saturn
- Release: JP: 1997
- Genre: Business simulation
- Mode: Single-player

The Conveni 2 (Note: Japanese: ザ・コンビニ2 ～全国チェーン展開だ!～, Hepburn: Za Konbini 2 ～ Zenkoku Chēn Tenkaida !～) is a 1997 business simulation video game developed by Masterpiece and published by Human Entertainment for the PlayStation and Sega Saturn. It is the sequel to the console versions of The Conveni, as well as the last game in the series to be published by Human Entertainment.

Hamster Corporation released the game as part of their Console Archives series for the Nintendo Switch 2 and PlayStation 5 in September 2026.

== Gameplay ==
The Conveni 2 is a simulation game played from a top-down perspective, where the player takes on the role of a store manager overseeing a convenience store, stocking various items to increase customer footfall, managing the store's accounts, and hiring or firing employees. Unlike its predecessor, the original top-down perspective is switched for an isometric perspective. The player can speed up time while significantly more locations can be opened. Video games can be unlocked and sold. Characters from Clock Tower and Twilight Syndrome make cameo appearances as clerks.
