= The Drug Store =

1998 video game

- Box art
- Developer: Human Entertainment
- Publisher: Human Entertainment
- Series: The Conveni
- Platform: PlayStation
- Release: JP: 1998
- Genre: Business simulation
- Mode: Single-player

The Drug Store: Matsumoto Kiyoshi de Okaimono! (Note: Japanese: ザ・ドラッグストア マツモトキヨシでお買いもの, Hepburn: Za Doraggu Sutoa Matsumotokiyoshi de o Kaimono; lit. "The Convenience Store ~ Monopolize That Town ~"), known simply as The Drug Store, is a 1998 business simulation video game developed and published by Human Entertainment for the PlayStation. It is a spin-off of Human's The Conveni series and the first without involvement from series developer Masterpiece. The original release was a tie in to Japanese drugstore chain Matsumoto Kiyoshi. Hamster Corporation acquired and reissued the game after Human Entertainment went defunct in 2000. Hamster Corporation released the game as part of their Console Archives series for the Nintendo Switch 2 and PlayStation 5 in October 2026.

== Gameplay ==
The Conveni is a simulation game played from a top-down perspective, where the player takes on the role of a store manager overseeing a drugstore, stocking various items to increase customer footfall, managing the store's accounts, and hiring or firing employees. Once the first location is successful enough, the player can start opening and managing more stores. The game's main objective is to attempting to expand the store's presence through business franchising until the player runs the entire retail empire.
