= Mizzurna Falls =

1998 video game

- Developer: Human Entertainment
- Publisher: Human Entertainment
- Director: Taichi Ishizuka
- Writer: Taichi Ishizuka
- Platform: PlayStation
- Release: JP: 23 December 1998
- Genre: Adventure
- Mode: Single-player

Mizzurna Falls (Note: Japanese: ミザーナフォールズ, Hepburn: Mizāna Fōruzu) is a 1998 adventure video game developed and published by Human Entertainment for the PlayStation. The game focuses on the search for a lost classmate in the fictional small rural American town of Mizzurna Falls. The story and setting draw inspiration from the American television drama series Twin Peaks.

The game was never officially localized outside of Japan, but in 2021 two independent English-language fan translation projects were completed and released to the public.

== Plot ==
The game takes place in Mizzurna Falls, a fictional town in Colorado near the Rocky Mountains.

On Christmas Day 1998, a young girl, Kathy Flannery, is discovered unconscious in the forest, apparently attacked by a bear because of the claw marks. When brought to the hospital she dies, and the cabin where the attack took place is now the site of a police investigation. Soon after, high school student Emma Rowland goes missing and the lead investigator Morgan believes the two cases are linked.

Emma's classmate Matthew Williams becomes involved in the investigation and strives to solve the case, in part because he was the last person to see Emma before she vanished.

== Gameplay ==
The player has seven days to explore the town and countryside talking to the residents in order to solve the mystery. The game operates on a day-night cycle, and each NPC in the game follows an individual schedule for each day. The town exists as a single integrated map, where one can seamlessly follow an NPC from location to location for their scheduled appointments.

The player can move in all directions and has total freedom to explore the town. The player has access to a Volkswagen Beetle and a boat to move around town quickly. Matthew can eat at the local diners, and must keep his car fueled. Matthew can also use his mobile phone to call other characters and certain businesses in the town. The player character is generally moved with tank controls, similar to Silent Hill. Certain scenes feature unique gameplay mechanics, such as hand-to-hand combat, vehicle pursuit, or covertly tailing a suspect.

The strict seven-day time limit makes it difficult to see all the events and get the best of the three endings, especially on a first play-through. Even saving the game requires scheduling, as the player is required to rest for either one or five in-game hours each time they do so.

== Development and release ==
Mizzurna Falls is the only game written and directed by designer Taichi Ishizuka, who previously worked on the 1994 action game The Firemen. Originally conceived as a closed circle mystery set in an old mansion, the scope was expanded to eventually encompass simulating an entire small town. Ishizuka was strongly influenced by the work of American filmmaker David Lynch—the game's setting is reminiscent of Twin Peaks, with story elements inspired by Blue Velvet. Many elements of the town of Mizzurna Falls were drawn from a 3 month long cross-country roadtrip from San Francisco to New York which Ishizuka took after the release of his previous game. Ishizuka led a team of contractors named Sun Studio, consisting of three graphic designers and four programmers. Music and sound effects were produced by a team of three Human Entertainment employees.

The game was released on 23 December 1998 in Japan for the PlayStation, and was published by Human Entertainment themselves. The game was never localized nor published in the West.

After Mizzurna Falls was released, most of Sun Studio founded a new independent game development company named Garden, but Ishizuka became dissatisfied with the realities of running a business and retired from video game development in 2004. He emigrated to Canada, where he became a tour guide for visitors going to the Canadian Rockies.

== Reception and legacy ==
Upon release, four reviewers from Famitsu gave Mizzurna Falls a score of 22 out of 40. The game is considered a precursor of popular open world games such as Shenmue, and an unusual title for a Japanese video game of that era, with its stress on realism.

Rolling Stone commented that the title was "quirky, weird, and rife with references to a cornucopia of media, namely Twin Peaks, and traces of it can now be seen in cult favorites like Deadly Premonition." Los Pakos, writing in Gametype in 2003, said that the game would undoubtedly had been considered a classic due to its more realistic storytelling in a horror game, and the most faithful simulation of an investigation on the PlayStation.

The game was never officially released outside of Japan. However, it attracted the curiosity of outsiders who could play the game by purchasing a Japanese version, or heard of its unique nature via word of mouth. In 2016, a freelance translator publicly released a complete English script of the game, and began working with a programmer to implement the script in the game itself. The process was technically complex due to the sheer amount of text in the game, and resulted only in the raw code of an incomplete patch eventually being made available in mid-2019. When a third party used this code to assemble an unfinished, buggy patch, the original programmer objected to being associated with an unfinished project, and had the patch pulled from distribution via a copyright complaint. Eventually, in 2021, a new programming team completed a fully-functional fan translation patch based on the same script, coincidentally at nearly the same time as another, totally unrelated, patch was released by an independent translator.
