= Fire Pro Wrestling World =

2017 professional wrestling video game

- Game logo
- Developer: ZEX Corporation
- Publisher: Spike Chunsoft
- Directors: Tomoyuki Matsumoto; Toshiaki Tamura
- Producers: Takashi Kobayashi; Yasu Iizuka
- Designers: Toshiaki Tamura; Takeshi Soejima
- Programmer: Toshiharu Kume
- Artist: Kazuhito Kimura
- Composers: Mitsuo Nakajima; Atsuhiro Motoyama
- Series: Fire Pro Wrestling
- Engine: Unity
- Platforms: Windows; PlayStation 4
- Release: Windows: WW: December 19, 2017; PlayStation 4: JP: August 9, 2018; US: August 28, 2018; EU: September 28, 2018
- Genres: Fighting, wrestling
- Modes: Single-player, multiplayer

Fire Pro Wrestling World is a professional wrestling video game published by Spike Chunsoft. The game was released on Steam on December 19, 2017, and for PlayStation 4 on August 9, August 28 and September 28, 2018, in Japan, the United States and Europe, respectively. The game is part of the Fire Pro Wrestling series.

== Gameplay ==
Fire Pro Wrestling World sees a return to the timing and strategy based gameplay the series has become famous for, which was dropped in the series' last game, Fire Pro Wrestling for the Xbox 360 in 2012, in favor of a button-mashing mini-game. Game modes include the traditional death matches, including steel cages, barbed wire and landmines, MMA rules matches, and more. Fire Pro Wrestling World is the first game in the series to incorporate online multiplayer, holding up to four players in a match.

The game is the first in the series to become licensed by New Japan Pro-Wrestling. It features a Story Mode, dubbed Fighting Road, and the IWGP Heavyweight Championship. A Jr. Heavyweight Fighting Road story, as well as a Promoter mode, dubbed Fire Promoter, were made available later as DLC shortly after release. A DLC featuring wrestlers from the women's professional wrestling promotion World Wonder Ring Stardom was added after the game's release. Another DLC pack titled "Fighting Road: Champion Road Beyond" which features Sumio Saeba, the son of Morio Sumisu, as he tries to restore his father's glory while maintaining his own career and reputation in a story that directly continues from Super Fire Pro Wrestling Special. Both stories were written by SUDA51.

== Reception ==
Reception

Aggregate score
| Aggregator | Score |
|---|---|
| Metacritic | 79/100 (PS4) |

Review scores
| Publication | Score |
|---|---|
| Destructoid | 7/10 (PS4) |
| Electronic Gaming Monthly | 4/5 (PS4) |
| Eurogamer | 7/10 (PS4) |
| Hardcore Gamer | 4/5 (PS4) |
| Push Square | 7/10 (PS4) |

The PlayStation 4 version of Fire Pro Wrestling World received "generally favorable reviews" according to review aggregator website Metacritic.

Sam Brooke of Push Square called the game a fun return to form for the series, but criticized it for not being accessible to all gamers.

== See also ==
- New Japan Pro-Wrestling
- World Wonder Ring Stardom
- List of licensed wrestling video games
- List of fighting games
