= Nakajima Satoru F-1 Hero '94 =

1994 video game

- Cover art
- Developer: Varie
- Publisher: Varie
- Series: Satoru Nakajima Formula One
- Platform: Super Famicom
- Release: JP: September 22, 1994
- Genre: Arcade-style Formula One racing
- Mode: Single-player

Nakajima Satoru F-1 Hero '94 (中嶋悟監修 Ｆ１ ＨＥＲＯ '94) is a 1994 Japan-exclusive Super Famicom Formula One arcade racing video game licensed (and also supervised) by Satoru Nakajima and by FOCA to Fuji Television. This was the sequel to Super F1 Hero and the last game endorsed by Nakajima.

== Summary ==
The game is all in the Japanese language. All teams and circuits of the 1994 Formula One season are represented. The game reflects the driver line-up later in the season; for example, David Coulthard, who was the replacement driver for Ayrton Senna after Imola, is in the Williams, and Jean-Marc Gounon replaces Roland Ratzenberger at Simtek. There is also the replacement of Karl Wendlinger, out for the rest of the season after Monaco, by Andrea de Cesaris. During the racing, the player can choose five type of views, from top-down perspective (similar to F-1 Grand Prix) to 3D polygon-based (similar to F1 Pole Position).

== Images ==
Supervisor: Satoru Nakajima.

One of the views.

== Circuits ==
Round	Race title	Grand Prix	Circuit
1	Grande Prêmio do Brasil	Brazilian GP	(Brazil) Autódromo José Carlos Pace, São Paulo
2	Pacific Grand Prix	Pacific GP	(Japan) TI Circuit, Aida
3	Gran Premio di San Marino	San Marino GP	(Italy) Autodromo Enzo e Dino Ferrari, Imola
4	Grand Prix de Monaco	Monaco GP	Circuit de Monaco, Monte Carlo
5	Gran Premio Marlboro de España	Spanish GP	(Spain) Circuit de Catalunya, Barcelona
6	Grand Prix Molson du Canada	Canadian GP	(Canada) Circuit Gilles Villeneuve, Montréal
7	Grand Prix de France	French GP	(France) Circuit de Nevers Magny-Cours
8	British Grand Prix	British GP	(United Kingdom) Silverstone Circuit
9	Großer Mobil 1 Preis von Deutschland	German GP	(Germany) Hockenheimring
10	Marlboro Magyar Nagydíj	Hungarian GP	(Hungary) Hungaroring, Budapest
11	Belgian Grand Prix	Belgian GP	(Belgium) Circuit de Spa-Francorchamps, Spa
12	Pioneer Gran Premio d'Italia	Italian GP	(Italy) Autodromo Nazionale Monza
13	Grande Prémio de Portugal	Portuguese GP	(Portugal) Autódromo do Estoril
14	Gran Premio de Europa	European GP	(Spain) Circuito Permanente de Jerez
15	Fuji Television Japanese Grand Prix	Japanese GP	(Japan) Suzuka Circuit
16	Adelaide Australian Grand Prix	Australian GP	(Australia) Adelaide Street Circuit

== See also ==
- Satoru Nakajima F-1 Hero GB World Championship '91
