= Turbo Racing =

Turbo Racing may refer to:

- Hot Wheels Turbo Racing, a Nintendo 64 video game
- Al Unser Jr.'s Turbo Racing, NES video game
