= F1 Circus (video game) =

1990 video game

- PC Engine box art
- Developers: Nichibutsu; Make Software (FC)
- Publisher: Nichibutsu
- Series: F1 Circus
- Platforms: PC-Engine; Family Computer
- Release: PC Engine: JP: September 14, 1990; Family Computer: JP: February 7, 1992
- Genre: Racing
- Mode: Single-player

F1 Circus (エフワン サーカス, Efuwan Sākasu) is a Formula One-based racing game developed and published by Nichibutsu for the PC Engine. It was ported to the Family Computer.

The game features British motor racing team Team Lotus, which they approved due to Nichibutsu's sponsorship of the team from 1991 to 1993.

== Reception ==
On release, Famicom Tsūshin scored the PC Engine version of the game a 31 out of 40.
