= Al Unser Jr.'s Road to the Top =

1994 video game

- Cover art
- Developer: Radical Entertainment
- Publishers: NA: The Software Toolworks; EU: Mindscape
- Designers: Vince Joly; Chris Lippmann
- Programmer: Chris Lippman
- Artists: Vince Joly; Ed Konyha; Yayoi Maruno-Chorney; Phillip Tse; Thom Bellaire
- Composers: Paul Wilkinson; Marc Baril
- Platform: Super NES
- Release: NA: November 1994; EU: 1994
- Genre: Racing
- Modes: Single-player, multiplayer

Al Unser Jr.'s Road to the Top is a racing video game released for the Super Nintendo Entertainment System.

== Gameplay ==
In order to succeed in the racing world, the player has to progress from go-karts to snowmobiles, IROC racing cars, and eventually to Indy racing cars.

If the player does well, then the final challenge is to take on Al Unser Jr. in the final event at Vancouver. This race uses the Molson Indy Vancouver as a final test of the player's skills. The player can also practice every stage of the game except the final stage. Go-kart racing involves regional action in the United States of America while snowmobiles provide challenge for the game's simulated winter months. Competing in the stock cars of the IROC is considered to be gaining experience for the faster and lighter open wheel vehicles of the Indy league.

Game progress is saved using passwords.

== Reception ==
In their review, GamePro described Al Unser Jr's Road to the Top as an excellent racing game for beginners due to its simple mechanics and controls and uncluttered graphics.

Allgame gave the game a rating of 2.5 out of 5 stars.

== Legacy ==
On December 15, 2025, a prototype of a never announced Sega Genesis port was released by the Video Game History Foundation, along with many Sega Channel materials.

== See also ==
- Al Unser Jr.'s Turbo Racing
