= Fire Pro Wrestling =

- Logo utilized in Fire Pro Wrestling World
- Genre: Professional wrestling
- Developers: Human Entertainment, Spike, Spike Chunsoft
- Publishers: Human Entertainment, Spike, BAM! Entertainment, Agetec, 505 Games, Microsoft Studios, Spike Chunsoft
- Creator: Masato Masuda
- Platform: Various (see table)
- First release: Fire Pro Wrestling Combination Tag; June 22, 1989
- Latest release: Fire Pro Wrestling World; December 18, 2017

Fire Pro Wrestling (ファイヤープロレスリング, Faiyā Puro Resuringu) is a professional wrestling video game series originating from Japan, started in 1989 by Human Entertainment, and currently developed and owned by Spike Chunsoft. The series is distinguished by its grappling system, which is primarily based on timed button presses and strategy. Another signature feature of the series is its Edit mode, a character creation feature with many options to customize appearances, wrestling moves and character artificial intelligence behavior.

Unlike many other pro wrestling games, most Fire Pro games are not licensed by any major professional wrestling promotion, but feature likenesses of real-life wrestlers under different names. Games in the series generally utilize 2-D sprite-based graphics, with some later games incorporating 3D graphical elements. Most of the titles in the Fire Pro Wrestling series have originally been released in Japan, although some of the games have seen releases in North America and worldwide.

== Series features ==
Unlike many other pro wrestling games, most games in the Fire Pro Wrestling series are not licensed by any major professional wrestling promotion, but feature likenesses of real-life wrestlers under different names. Games in the series generally utilize 2-D sprite-based graphics, with some later games incorporating 3-D graphical elements. The spin-off series King of Colosseum features polygonal 3-D graphics.

The Fire Pro Wrestling series of games distinguish themselves from other wrestling games by combining several unique features. One feature is the focus on a timing-based grappling control system. The grappling control system encourages the use of complex strategy, built on working up to using increasingly powerful moves on the player's opponent. The timing-based system also stands in contrast to the button-mashing tactics with which most 2-D wrestling gamers are familiar.

Another feature of Fire Pro Wrestling games is the inclusion of a large roster of playable wrestlers and fighters from different promotions located around the world. The wrestlers and promotions are renamed from their real-life counterparts to avoid issues with copyright, and represent many different styles of professional wrestling: North American WWE style sports-entertainment, Mexican lucha-libre, various styles of Japanese puroresu: athletic junior-heavyweight style, realistic strong-style, women's joshi wrestling, and violent hardcore wrestling, as well as different styles of other combat sports.

A variety of match types are available in the Fire Pro Wrestling series of games, with flexible settings for the rules within each match. This complements the variety of wrestlers available as playable characters. Different match types include conventional singles and tag-team wrestling matches, extreme hardcore matches such as the "Landmine Death Match" or "Electric Barbed Wire Cage Match", and various types of combat sports matches.

Another distinguishing feature of the Fire Pro Wrestling games, particularly the later games in the series, is the inclusion of an extensive and highly detailed wrestler creation and edit mode. The edit mode of Fire Pro Wrestling games allows players to build game characters with a high level of attention to detail. Appearance characteristics, such as clothing and ring attire, and physical build, head and facial features, can be customized for a created wrestler. A detailed set of wrestling and fighting moves, drawn from the large pool of moves contained in each game, can also be assigned to a created wrestler. The edit mode also allows players to make detailed changes to the CPU logic of an edited wrestler, making it possible for a skilled creator to create a wrestler that behaves very much like his real-life counterpart, even when controlled by the computer.

Later titles in the series allowed for customization of other aspects of professional wrestling, including changing the design of the ring mat and apron, creating customized championship belts, and creation and editing of referees. The detailed character creation and edit mode of the Fire Pro Wrestling games became an influential feature that was eventually added to other wrestling and sports games.

The combination of features included in Fire Pro Wrestling games allows players to create "dream matchups" between wrestlers from different promotions, or different eras in the history of professional wrestling, as well as matches between real-life wrestlers and fighters, fictional characters and non-wrestling athletes and celebrities.

== Overview ==
Beginning with the first title in the series from Human Entertainment, Fire Pro Wrestling Combination Tag for PC Engine in 1989, the Fire Pro Wrestling series eventually produced editions of games for many systems, notably the Super Famicom, Sega Saturn, Game Boy Advance, Dreamcast and the PlayStation 2. Human also released a wrestling game outside of the series in 1989 for Game Boy. Titled Pro Wrestling in its native Japan, it was released internationally as HAL Wrestling. Most of the titles in the Fire Pro Wrestling series have been released exclusively in Japan, although some of the games have seen releases in North America.

The series became popular in Japan, but did not see an official international release until after Spike took over the franchise in 2000. Early games in the series were popular outside Japan with import gamers, and at least one game, Super Fire Pro Wrestling X Premium for Super Famicom, received an unofficial fan translation through video game console emulators. Fire Pro Wrestling A for the Game Boy Advance was released internationally as Fire Pro Wrestling in 2001, and was one of the titles initially available when the Game Boy Advance was launched in Japan and North America. Four editions of the game have received official English translations: Fire Pro Wrestling (2001) and Fire Pro Wrestling 2 (2002) for the GBA, Fire Pro Wrestling Returns for PS2 (2007), and Fire Pro Wrestling World for the Steam PC platform (2017) and PS4 (2018).

A 3-D avatar-based version of Fire Pro Wrestling for the Xbox 360 was released in 2012. In hopes of appealing to a more casual audience, the developers decided on debuting a new gameplay engine that would use a button-mashing minigame system to perform moves, and not using the well-reviewed timing elements from previous versions of the game.

Spike Chunsoft developed another installment, titled Fire Pro Wrestling World, returning the series to its roots, in terms of graphical presentation and gameplay mechanics. Also, the new game was the first in the series to incorporate online multiplayer gameplay on the PC via Steam and the PlayStation 4 console. Fire Pro Wrestling World was released on Steam for the PC platform in 2017. The PlayStation 4 version was released in 2018. The game was licensed by New Japan Pro-Wrestling, making Fire Pro Wrestling World the first title in the series to be licensed by the promotion, and the first NJPW-licensed game in over eleven years.

== Titles ==
=== Human Entertainment ===
Game	Details
Fire Pro Wrestling Combination Tag Original release date(s): JP: June 22, 1989 (PCE) March 13, 2007 (VC)	Release years by system: PC Engine; Virtual Console
Fire Pro Wrestling Combination Tag Original release date(s): JP: June 22, 1989 (PCE) March 13, 2007 (VC)	Notes: Known in Japan as ファイヤープロレスリング コンビネーションタッグ.
Fire Pro Wrestling 2nd Bout Original release date(s): JP: August 30, 1991 (PCE) May 27, 2008 (VC)	Release years by system: PC Engine; Virtual Console
Fire Pro Wrestling 2nd Bout Original release date(s): JP: August 30, 1991 (PCE) May 27, 2008 (VC)	Notes: Known in Japan as ファイヤープロレスリング 2nd BOUT.
Super Fire Pro Wrestling Original release date(s): JP: December 20, 1991	Release years by system: Super Famicom
Super Fire Pro Wrestling Original release date(s): JP: December 20, 1991	Notes: Known in Japan as スーパーファイヤープロレスリング.
Thunder Pro Wrestling Retsuden Original release date(s): JP: March 27, 1992	Release years by system: Sega Mega Drive
Thunder Pro Wrestling Retsuden Original release date(s): JP: March 27, 1992	Notes: Known in Japan as サンダープロレスリング列伝.
Fire Pro Wrestling 3: Legend Bout Original release date(s): JP: November 13, 1992 (PCE) December 24, 2008 (VC)	Release years by system: PC Engine; Virtual Console
Fire Pro Wrestling 3: Legend Bout Original release date(s): JP: November 13, 1992 (PCE) December 24, 2008 (VC)	Notes: Known in Japan as ファイヤープロレスリング3 レジェンドバウト.
Super Fire Pro Wrestling 2 Original release date(s): JP: December 25, 1992	Release years by system: Super Famicom
Super Fire Pro Wrestling 2 Original release date(s): JP: December 25, 1992	Notes: Known in Japan as スーパーファイヤープロレスリング2.
Super Fire Pro Wrestling 3 Final Bout Original release date(s): JP: December 29, 1993	Release years by system: Super Famicom
Super Fire Pro Wrestling 3 Final Bout Original release date(s): JP: December 29, 1993	Notes: Known in Japan as スーパーファイヤープロレスリング3 ファイナルバウト.; A simplified version of the game known as Super Fire Pro Wrestling 3 Easy Type (スーパーファイヤープロレスリング3 EASY TYPE) was released for the Super Famicom on February 4, 1994.
Fire Pro Women: All Star Dream Slam Original release date(s): JP: July 22, 1994	Release years by system: Super Famicom
Fire Pro Women: All Star Dream Slam Original release date(s): JP: July 22, 1994	Notes: Known in Japan as ファイプロ女子 オールスタードリームスラム.; Officially licensed by All Japan Women's Pro-Wrestling.
Super Fire Pro Wrestling Special Original release date(s): JP: December 22, 1994	Release years by system: Super Famicom
Super Fire Pro Wrestling Special Original release date(s): JP: December 22, 1994	Notes: Known in Japan as スーパーファイヤープロレスリング スペシャル.
Blazing Tornado Original release date(s): JP: 1994	Release years by system: Arcade
Blazing Tornado Original release date(s): JP: 1994	Notes: Known in Japan as ブレイジングトルネード.; A version of the game was released for the Sega Saturn on August 25, 1995 as Fire Pro Another Story: Blazing Tornado ( ファイプロ外伝 ブレイジングトルネード, "Fai-Puro Gaiden Blazing Tornado" in Japan).
Wrestling Universe: Fire Pro Women: Dome Super Female Big Battle: All Japan Women VS J.W.P. Original release date(s): JP: February 3, 1995	Release years by system: PC Engine (ARCADE CD-ROM²)
Wrestling Universe: Fire Pro Women: Dome Super Female Big Battle: All Japan Women VS J.W.P. Original release date(s): JP: February 3, 1995	Notes: Known in Japan as ファイプロ女子 憧夢超女大戦 全女 VS JWP.; Officially licensed by All Japan Women's Pro-Wrestling & J.W.P. (Japan Women's Pro-Wrestling).
Super Fire Pro Wrestling: Queen's Special Original release date(s): JP: June 30, 1995	Release years by system: Super Famicom
Super Fire Pro Wrestling: Queen's Special Original release date(s): JP: June 30, 1995	Notes: Known in Japan as スーパーファイヤープロレスリング クイーンズスペシャル.; Officially licensed by All Japan Women's Pro-Wrestling.
Super Fire Pro Wrestling X Original release date(s): JP: December 2, 1995	Release years by system: Super Famicom
Super Fire Pro Wrestling X Original release date(s): JP: December 2, 1995	Notes: Known in Japan as スーパーファイヤープロレスリングX.
Fire Pro Wrestling: Iron Slam '96 Original release date(s): JP: March 15, 1996	Release years by system: PlayStation
Fire Pro Wrestling: Iron Slam '96 Original release date(s): JP: March 15, 1996	Notes: Known in Japan as ファイヤープロレスリング アイアンスラム’96.
Super Fire Pro Wrestling X Premium Original release date(s): JP: March 29, 1996	Release years by system: Super Famicom
Super Fire Pro Wrestling X Premium Original release date(s): JP: March 29, 1996	Notes: Known in Japan as スーパーファイヤープロレスリングX プレミアム.
Fire Prowrestling S: 6Men Scramble Original release date(s): JP: December 27, 1996	Release years by system: Sega Saturn
Fire Prowrestling S: 6Men Scramble Original release date(s): JP: December 27, 1996	Notes: Known in Japan as ファイヤープロレスリングS 6メン・スクランブル.
Fire Pro Wrestling G Original release date(s): JP: June 24, 1999 (PS1) February 25, 2009 (PSN)	Release years by system: PlayStation; PlayStation Network
Fire Pro Wrestling G Original release date(s): JP: June 24, 1999 (PS1) February 25, 2009 (PSN)	Notes: Known in Japan as ファイヤープロレスリングG.; The final Human Entertainment released Fire Pro Wrestling game.

=== Spike / Spike Chunsoft ===
Game	Details
Fire Pro Wrestling for WonderSwan Original release date(s): JP: August 31, 2000	Release years by system: WonderSwan
Fire Pro Wrestling for WonderSwan Original release date(s): JP: August 31, 2000	Notes: Known in Japan as ファイヤープロレスリング for WonderSwan
Fire Pro Wrestling i Original release date(s): JP: January 22, 2001	Release years by system: i-mode
Fire Pro Wrestling i Original release date(s): JP: January 22, 2001	Notes: Known in Japan as ファイヤープロレスリングi.
Fire Pro Wrestling D Original release date(s): JP: March 1, 2001	Release years by system: Dreamcast
Fire Pro Wrestling D Original release date(s): JP: March 1, 2001	Notes: Known in Japan as ファイヤープロレスリングD.
Fire Pro Wrestling Original release date(s): JP: March 21, 2001; NA: June 10, 2001	Release years by system: Game Boy Advance
Fire Pro Wrestling Original release date(s): JP: March 21, 2001; NA: June 10, 2001	Notes: Known in Japan as ファイヤープロレスリングA.
Fire Pro Wrestling J Original release date(s): JP: February 4, 2002	Release years by system: J-PHONE
Fire Pro Wrestling J Original release date(s): JP: February 4, 2002	Notes: Known in Japan as ファイヤープロレスリングJ.
Fire Pro Wrestling 2 Original release date(s): JP: July 19, 2002; NA: October 23, 2002	Release years by system: Game Boy Advance
Fire Pro Wrestling 2 Original release date(s): JP: July 19, 2002; NA: October 23, 2002	Notes: Known in Japan as ファイナルファイヤープロレスリング～夢の団体運営!～.
Fire Pro Wrestling Z Original release date(s): JP: June 5, 2003	Release years by system: PlayStation 2
Fire Pro Wrestling Z Original release date(s): JP: June 5, 2003	Notes: Known in Japan as ファイヤープロレスリングZ.
Fire Pro Wrestling Returns Original release date(s): JP: September 15, 2005; NA: November 13, 2007 April 23, 2013 (PSN)	Release years by system: PlayStation 2 PlayStation Network (Direct port of PS2 version to PlayStation 3)
Fire Pro Wrestling Returns Original release date(s): JP: September 15, 2005; NA: November 13, 2007 April 23, 2013 (PSN)	Notes: Known in Japan as ファイプロ・リターンズ.
Fire Pro Wrestling in Mobage Original release date(s): JP: November 12, 2011	Release years by system: Mobage
Fire Pro Wrestling in Mobage Original release date(s): JP: November 12, 2011	Notes: Known in Japan as ファイヤープロレスリング in Mobage.; Social network game.
Fire Pro Wrestling Original release date(s): WW: September 21, 2012	Release years by system: Xbox 360
Fire Pro Wrestling Original release date(s): WW: September 21, 2012	Notes: Published by Microsoft Studios.; Xbox Live Arcade release.
Fire Pro Wrestling World Original release date(s): Steam: WW: December 18, 2017; PS4: JPN: August 8, 2018; NA: August 28, 2018; EU: September 28, 2018	Release years by system: Steam; PlayStation 4
Fire Pro Wrestling World Original release date(s): Steam: WW: December 18, 2017; PS4: JPN: August 8, 2018; NA: August 28, 2018; EU: September 28, 2018	Notes: Known in Japan as ファイアープロレスリングワールド.; First Fire Pro Wrestling title to be officially licensed by New Japan Pro-Wrestling and World Wonder Ring Stardom.; Steam Beta release on July 10, 2017.

== Spin-offs ==
Game	Details
HAL Wrestling Original release date(s): JP: September 14, 1990; NA: December 1990	Release years by system: Game Boy
HAL Wrestling Original release date(s): JP: September 14, 1990; NA: December 1990	Notes: Known in Japan as プロレス.
All Japan Pro Wrestling: Soul of Champion Original release date(s): JP: April 8, 1999	Release years by system: PlayStation
All Japan Pro Wrestling: Soul of Champion Original release date(s): JP: April 8, 1999	Notes: Known in Japan as 全日本プロレス~王者の魂~.; Officially licensed by All Japan Pro Wrestling.
King of Colosseum (Red) New Japan x All Japan x Pancrase Disc Original release date(s): JP: December 19, 2002	Release years by system: PlayStation 2
King of Colosseum (Red) New Japan x All Japan x Pancrase Disc Original release date(s): JP: December 19, 2002	Notes: Known in Japan as キング オブ コロシアム（赤） ～新日本×全日本×パンクラス ディスク～.; Officially licensed by New Japan-Pro Wrestling, All Japan Pro Wrestling and Pancrase.
King of Colosseum (Green) ~NOAH x Zero-One Disc~ Original release date(s): JP: March 6, 2003	Release years by system: PlayStation 2
King of Colosseum (Green) ~NOAH x Zero-One Disc~ Original release date(s): JP: March 6, 2003	Notes: Known in Japan as キング オブ コロシアム（緑） ～ノア×ZERO-ONE ディスク～.; Officially licensed by Pro Wrestling NOAH and Pro Wrestling Zero-One.
King of Colosseum II Original release date(s): JP: September 9, 2004	Release years by system: PlayStation 2
King of Colosseum II Original release date(s): JP: September 9, 2004	Notes: Known in Japan as キング オブ コロシアムII.

== See also ==
- List of licensed wrestling video games
- List of fighting games
