= The Firemen 2: Pete & Danny =

1995 video game

- Developer: Media Entertainment
- Publisher: Human Entertainment
- Directors: Hitoshi Abe; Shinobu Ogawa
- Producer: Akihiro Nagashima
- Designer: Tomoko Onodera
- Programmers: Mamoru Hakamata; Naoya Nishina; Shigefumi Nakahara
- Artists: Akiko Nagayoshi; Akiko Suetake; Atsushi Suzuki
- Writer: Tomoko Onodera
- Composer: Kenji Satoh
- Series: The Firemen
- Platform: PlayStation
- Release: JP: December 22, 1995
- Genre: Action-adventure
- Modes: Single-player, multiplayer

The Firemen 2: Pete & Danny (ザ・ファイヤーメン2 ピート & ダニー) is an action-adventure game developed by Human Entertainment and released for the PlayStation in 1995. It is a sequel to The Firemen.

== Gameplay ==
Gameplay screenshot

Similar to the earlier game in the series, The Firemen 2 involves stopping a deadly fire, this time in a theme park on Christmas Eve. The game supports both single-player and co-op play. Players must put out small fires on the ground by spraying them with their hose, which only impede progress. Moving and tall fires can hurt the player and must be put out with a standard spray. A water bomb gives off a spray of water and puts out all fires in the vicinity.

Levels have a different outcome depending on whether the player is able to save people trapped in the fire. Victims appear on the radar and the player must attempt to reach them in time.

== Plot ==
Two firemen, Pete and Danny, are called in to respond to a fire in a high-tech amusement park where the robots have run amok and set fire to it. The robots in the various attractions appear as bosses, such as an animatronic T-Rex.

== Release ==
Fireman 2 was released in Japan on December 22, 1995, for the Sony PlayStation.

It was not released in the West until it was published by MonkeyPaw Games on January 28, 2014, on PlayStation Network as a digital download for the price of $5.99. However, the game was not localized and still retains its original Japanese voice acting without subtitles.

It was released by Hamster Corporation as part of their Console Archives series in November 2026 for Nintendo Switch 2 and PlayStation 5.

== Reception ==
Reception

Review score
Publication	Score
Dengeki PlayStation	75/100, 75/100, 75/100, 85/100

Three reviewers for GameFan gave it a 66, 45, and 70, scores.

Jenni Lada of TechnologyTell rated the game a "B", saying it was a unique experience and praising the inclusion of a co-op mode, but criticizing its stuttering issues.

Conrad Zimmerman of Destructoid said he was "totally smitten" by the premise of "firefighters working together in a cooperative game" and said he wished he knew of its existence when it was released. However, Allistair Pinsof, of the same publication, called the game "lackluster".

Hardcore Gaming 101 called the game "rushed", saying it was "unfinished" and criticizing the removal of gameplay mechanics from the first game.
