= The Adventures of Gilligan's Island =

1990 video game

- Cover art
- Developer: Human Entertainment, Inc.
- Publisher: Bandai America, Inc.
- Designers: Hiroyuki Itoh; Sun Shi Fai; Koo Wai San
- Composers: Masaki Hashimoto; Takahiro Wakuta
- Platform: NES
- Release: NA: July 1990
- Genres: Action; Strategy
- Mode: Single-player

The Adventures of Gilligan's Island (also known as Gilligan's Island: The Video Game) is a single-player Nintendo Entertainment System video game by Bandai that is based on the 1960s sitcom Gilligan's Island.

== Gameplay ==
Gilligan and Skipper traverse one of the game's levels.

The player controls the Skipper and is followed around by Gilligan, who is controlled by the computer.

The game's four levels are dotted with threats from creatures in addition to headhunters and the surrounding terrain. The player has to wander around the island, collecting various objects, speaking with the other castaways (Mr. Howell, Mrs. Howell, the Professor, and Mary Ann) and solving various puzzles. Players must also frequently rescue Gilligan, who frequently gets lost or stuck in things, the player has to pull him back with a rope or rescue him if he falls down one of many holes. The game has a password feature for all four levels.

Enemies deplete the player's life bar and there is also a time limit for each level. The Skipper can attack most of the game's enemies with a punch or a club. There are four bosses in the game (a gorilla, a large cannibal who is the leader of the headhunters, a grizzly bear, and an undead skeleton).
