= The Conveni 200X =

2006 video game

- Developer: Masterpiece
- Publisher: Hamster
- Platform: Xbox 360
- Release: JP: March 30, 2006
- Genre: Simulation
- Mode: Single-player

The Conveni 200X is a convenience store simulation game designed for the Xbox 360 system. The game was released on March 30, 2006, and was developed by Masterpiece and published by Hamster Corporation. The game is part of Hamster's The Conveni franchise.

== Gameplay ==
The Conveni 200X is a simulation game played from a top-down perspective. The player takes on the role of a store manager, overseeing a Conveni 200X branded convenience store, stocking various items to increase customer footfall, managing the store's accounts, and hiring or firing employees. Some of the items stocked include ice cream, alcohol, instant noodles, and condoms.

Once the first location is successful enough, the player can start opening and managing more stores. The game's main objective is to attempting to expand the store's presence through business franchising until the player runs the entire retail empire.

The game is a sequel to The Conveni: Ano Machi o Dokusen Seyo, released in 1997 for the PlayStation and Sega Saturn.

== Sequels ==
The game was followed up by The Conveni DS: Otona no Keiei Ryoku Training (2009) for Nintendo DS, and The Conveni Portable (2010) for PlayStation Portable.

In 2026, Hamster re-released the original 1997 game as part of the publisher's Console Archives series.
