= Fire Pro Wrestling Returns =

2005 video game

- North American box art
- Developer: Spike
- Publishers: JP: Spike; NA: Agetec; EU: 505 Games
- Director: Toshiaki Tamura
- Producer: Hiroyuki Yonezawa
- Designer: Toshiaki Tamura
- Programmers: Akito Yoneda; Takeshi Aikō
- Artists: Takeshi Kadoma; Satoru Minei; Kazuhisa Watarigawa
- Composers: Takafumi Wada; Yoko Wada; Mituhiro Uehara
- Series: Fire Pro Wrestling
- Platforms: PlayStation 2, PlayStation Network
- Release: PlayStation 2: JP: September 15, 2005; NA: November 13, 2007; EU: February 8, 2008; PlayStation Network: NA: April 23, 2013
- Genres: Fighting, wrestling
- Modes: Single-player, multiplayer

Fire Pro Wrestling Returns, known in Japan as Fi-Pro Returns (ファイプロ・リターンズ, FaiPuro Ritānzu), is a professional wrestling video game that was released in 2005 in Japan, and was released on November 13, 2007, in North America and February 8, 2008, in Italy, Spain and Portugal. The game is part of the Fire Pro Wrestling series.

== Gameplay ==
Like other titles in the Fire Pro Wrestling series, Fire Pro Wrestling Returns distinguishes itself from other wrestling games by focusing on timing and strategy, as opposed to button-mashing. Fire Pro Wrestling Returns offers a roster of 327 wrestlers from a variety of real-life wrestling companies. Players can create custom characters, wrestling rings, belts, promotions, and referees. Returns supplies new customizing tools, such as a "Face Layer" feature that allows players to create a wrestler's face using multiple objects. Game modes include a traditional cage match, Exploding Barbed Wire Deathmatch, and Match Maker mode, wherein the player must book shows and try to get a good grade on the shows based on crowd reaction.

== Reception ==
Reception

Aggregate score
Aggregator	Score
Metacritic	78/100

Review scores
Publication	Score
1Up.com	A+
Famitsu	31/40
GameSpot	7/10
GameSpy	4.5/5
IGN	7/10
PlayStation Official Magazine – UK	9/10
PlayStation: The Official Magazine	2.5/5
411Mania	(2) 10/10 (1) 9.7/10

The game received "generally favorable reviews" according to the review aggregation website Metacritic. In Japan, Famitsu gave it a score of 31 out of 40.

== See also ==
- List of licensed wrestling video games
- List of fighting games
