= Waku Waku Ski Wonder Spur =

1995 video game

- Developer: Human Club
- Publisher: Human Entertainment
- Composers: Chiyomaru Shikura; Kaori Takazoe
- Platform: Super Famicom
- Release: JP: January 13, 1995
- Genre: Sports (skiing)
- Modes: Single-player; Multiplayer

Waku Waku Ski Wonder Spur (わくわくスキー わんだあシュプール, Wakuwaku skii wandā shupūru) is a Skiing video game, developed by Human Club and published by Human Entertainment, which was released exclusively in Japan in 1995.

The game was released on January 13, 1995, for the Super Famicom system in Japan. Famitsu gave it a 21 out of 40 score.
