= Fire Pro Wrestling (2001 video game) =

- Developer: Spike
- Publishers: JP: Spike; NA/EU: BAM! Entertainment
- Series: Fire Pro Wrestling
- Platform: Game Boy Advance
- Release: JP: March 21, 2001; NA: June 11, 2001; EU: June 22, 2001
- Genres: Fighting, wrestling
- Mode: Single-player

This is about the 2001 game for Game Boy Advance. For the series, see Fire Pro Wrestling.

Fire Pro Wrestling (released in Japan as Fire Pro Wrestling A (ファイヤープロレスリング A, Faiyā Puro Resuringu A)) is a professional wrestling video game in the Fire Pro Wrestling series and was the first Fire Pro game to receive an official release outside of Japan. A direct sequel, Fire Pro Wrestling 2, was released in 2002.

== Gameplay ==
As with other games in the series, Fire Pro Wrestling is not licensed by any major professional wrestling promotions, instead using likenesses of existing wrestlers with fake names; for an example, the wrestler The Bionic Man Steve Majors is a fictionalized version of the WWE wrestler Stone Cold Steve Austin, or The Wraith Mystery Man being a fictionalized version of (at the time) World Championship Wrestling wrestler Rey Mysterio. As with Fire Pro games, MMA is featured in the game and federations like Pride and the Ultimate Fighting Championship feature with fighters. The game features over a hundred different characters.

Fire Pro Wrestling makes the player play with strategy. The games use the A and B buttons for striking and grappling.

The game features a variety of different modes, such as tournaments and leagues that task the player with winning bracket-style competitions against up to 15 and 63 opponents, respectively. There is also exhibition modes, allowing player to tweak rules and music, and also a robust create-a-wrestler mode, which allows players to build a character from more than 1,200 different techniques and hundreds of body parts. Most unique to Fire Pro Wrestling is the game's audience mode, where your goal is not necessarily to win, but to please the crowd by breaking out of pinfall attempts at the last second, defeating opponents after a finisher, or taunting your opponent. Success frequently depends on which league you align yourself with; for an example, the luchador-styled league will gain greater audience reception from performing high-flying, more athletic moves.

== Release ==
The game was a launch title for the Game Boy Advance for Japan.

== Reception ==
Reception

Aggregate score
Aggregator	Score
Metacritic	80/100

Review scores
Publication	Score
Electronic Gaming Monthly	7.5/10
Eurogamer	7/10
Famitsu	27/40
Game Informer	8.5/10
GameSpot	8.7/10
IGN	7.5/10
Jeuxvideo.com	10/20
Next Generation	3/5
Nintendo Power	1.5/5
Nintendo World Report	7.5/10

The game received "favorable" reviews, earning an average score of 80 based on 10 critic reviews, according to the review aggregation website Metacritic.

Reviewing the game for GameSpot, Gerald Villoria spoke positively of the game, describing it as having "made the transition from Japan to the USA extremely well", praising its 'create a wrestler' system and describing the controls as "absolutely flawless". He also praised the game for its wide variety of modes, particularly its audience match mode.

However, NextGen gave a more mixed review to the game, saying that the game's difficulty would make it inaccessible for the novices. In Japan, Famitsu gave it a score of 27 out of 40. Bad Hare of GamePro said, "fans would be wise to cut Fire Pro Wrestling some slack in the name of depth. If you like old-school smackdowns, get in the ring!" (Note: GamePro gave the game 3.5/5 for graphics, 3/5 for sound, and two 4/5 scores for control and fun factor.) Nintendo Power was far more critical of the title, noting it as having "choppy animation and sluggish controls", and specifically criticized the graphics, describing them as "graphically underwhelming" and negatively describing the game "looks and feels like it should be for the GBC rather than the GBA".
