= Super Fire Pro Wrestling: Queen's Special =

1995 video game

- Cover art
- Developer: Human Club
- Publisher: Human Entertainment
- Series: Fire Pro Wrestling
- Platforms: Super Famicom, TurboGrafx-CD
- Release: Super Famicom: JP: June 30, 1995; PC Engine CD: JP: February 3, 1995
- Genre: Wrestling
- Modes: Single-player, multiplayer

Super Fire Pro Wrestling: Queen's Special (スーパーファイヤープロレスリング クイーンズスペシャル) is a Japan-exclusive video game based on All Japan Women's Pro-Wrestling and is an installment of the Fire Pro Wrestling series. It was released exclusively for the Super Famicom, although an unofficial English translation exists.

== Gameplay ==
One of the wrestlers is applying the abdominal stretch to her opponent.

Every wrestler has three different variations of moves that work at different times; grappling only become available to the player after using the strongest move to weaken the opponent. Creating up to 16 customized wrestlers is a possibility, with a generous display of wardrobe options. The referee has the ability to be knocked out. He cannot do pinfalls or count out opponents who are outside the ring while unconscious. Like in actual wrestling, rope breaks can be ordered by the referee.

This game features genuine female professional wrestlers from All Japan Women's Pro-Wrestling, unlike the non-Joshi Fire Pro games which featured carbon copies with false names. Bull Nakano and Akira Hokuto can be unlocked for completing the challenge mode. While lacking in a proper story line, players can choose from a variety of gimmick matches.

== Reception ==
On release, Famicom Tsūshin scored the game a 29 out of 40.

== See also ==
- List of licensed wrestling video games
