= Final Match Tennis =

1991 video game

- Cover art
- Developer: Human Entertainment
- Publisher: Human Entertainment
- Programmer: Ryōji Amano
- Composer: Hironori Tanaka
- Series: Final Match Tennis
- Platform: PC Engine
- Release: JP: March 1, 1991
- Genre: Sports
- Modes: Single-player, multiplayer

Final Match Tennis (ファイナルマッチテニス) is a 1991 tennis video game that was developed and published by Human Entertainment exclusively for the PC Engine.

A similar game with improved graphics titled Final Match Tennis Ladies was included in Human Sports Festival, a sports compilation that contains three previously unreleased titles. Two standalone follow-ups were also released, 1994's Super Final Match Tennis for the Super Famicom and the 1996 PlayStation title Hyper Final Match Tennis.

== Gameplay ==
The game's roster has 16 male players based on real-life tennis players, all with different strengths and weaknesses. For instance, Björn Borg has a poor serve but is fast and excels at topspin shots and is especially challenging to play against on a clay court. Boris Becker can serve bombs and has great volleys but is a bit slow.

Smashes, stop balls, volleys, back and forehand spins or lobs are all featured in the game. Some players hit with topspin and others hit the ball flat and some do not have a backspin. The player cannot hit different types of serves, only flat and slow.

There are three modes available: Exhibition (single match), World Tour (career) and training stages. Through the use of a multiplayer adapter, up to four players can compete in any combination in singles and doubles.

== Reception ==
Reception

Review score
Publication	Score
Famitsu	8/10, 8/10, 8/10, 8/10

Final Match Tennis was released for the PC Engine in Japan on March 1, 1991.

Final Match Tennis was awarded the "Best PC Engine Game in 1991" by the German computer and video games magazine Power Play on their February 1992 issue, scoring 91 out of 100 points. Video Games, another German magazine gave the game a 91 out of 100. The British magazine CVG gave the game 90 out of 100 points, complimenting the controls and the depth of the game mechanics. They also praised the game's multiplayer options and artificial intelligence. Comparing it with Kick Off II and John Madden Football, they called it a "truly stunning game" and "one of the finest computer sports simulations available on any machine."
