= Taekwon-Do (video game) =

1994 video game

- Cover art
- Developer: Human Entertainment
- Publisher: Human Entertainment
- Platform: Super Famicom
- Release: JP: June 28, 1994
- Genres: Fighting; Sports
- Modes: Single-player, multiplayer

Taekwon-Do (テコンドー) is a 2D Taekwondo fighting video game that attempts to capture a realistic tone of Taekwondo tournament fighting. It was developed and published by Human Entertainment, and was released in Japan and South Korea in 1994.

== Gameplay ==
Title screen and gameplay

Taekwon-Do is based on real Taekwondo, using real attacks/techniques and tournament rules. All in all there are 19 different fighters who all have their own stats and special moves, and players can also make their own customized fighter/character with unique abilities, etc. The fighting control is very simple with the standardized attack buttons and direction button attack button combinations. There are four different game modes: tournament, versus, tag battle by turns and practice. Before start the game, the player can choose from two languages: Japanese or Korean.

There is no movement list, and no specials or hidden moves for all the vast majority of fighters. Unlike most fighting games, the player does not need to memorize the special/super move sets every time when different characters are chosen from time to time. The varieties of attacks for all characters in Taekwon-Do only lies in the four buttons of X, Y, B, and A, with a different start up. If the player pushes the directional buttons, each character will have eight different moves that the player can combine throughout the fight. The match itself can either end in five rounds like a common taekwondo competition (at the time the game was released), or if the opponent is knocked out cold before the 5th round.

== Characters ==
Although the game offers a wide selection of 19 characters, there are 8 characters that could be considered the game's protagonists, since they are the first selectable characters for the Story mode and the Instruction booklet has illustrations and back stories for each of them:

Lee: 25 years old, he is the representative from the Kansai region. He is a Taekwondo Dojang owner and his hobbies include going to the Cinema and the aquarium, in addition to teaching children at the Town Hall. He is rumoured to be the closest fighter to becoming the next Olympic representative. He is an "All around" type character, meaning he is well-balanced and has no glaring shortcomings. He wears a standard White and Black Taekwondo Dobok, hair that is depicted in booklets as black but is brown in-game, and a white bandana tied around his head. He is the only character to be depicted wearing his dobok in the instruction booklet, showing his commitment to the art. He is also the game's "Master" or trainer in the in-game tutorials.

Shun: 20 years old, he is a college student hailing from the Kanto region. His hobbies include playing tennis and skying. Considered a genius talent and an Ace in Taekwondo and famous as a fighter since he was very young, he nonetheless appears to have had an accident, causing him to undergo medical treatment, which in turn has made him anxious about his ability to perform. This is reflected in the game, as his stats are all very high, except for his stamina, which is the lowest among all fighters. He is present in every screenshot of the game found in the booklet as Lee's opponent, perhaps hinting at a rivalry between them. He wears a Green and Black uniform and has slick, red-brown hair with bangs. He is depicted with a turtleneck sweater covered with a shirt and a jacket in the booklet. Like Lee, he is an "All around" type character, meaning he has no weaknesses, however, his stamina is abysmally low. This could be a blessing in hiding though, as becoming rapidly exhausted gives Shun the ability to use his super technique more often than any other fighter.

Kai: 23 years old, he represents the Koshinetsu area. He works at a gym and his hobby is body building. He is a hot-blooded up-and-coming Taekwondo star who has emphasized the power-building aspect of his training, honing his body every day. As such, he is the physically strongest character and has a sizable pool of stamina. He uses his power to make up for his lower speed and technique stats, meaning his attacks can be slow, but devastating. He's fairly distinctive, wearing a Red and Black Taekwondo dobok and matching bandana around his head, with brown hair in-game, although he is depicted as black-haired in the booklet, where he's also shown wearing sports apparel and lifting weights. He is the game's first "Power" type character and as such, hits harder than other fighters, being capable of landing a Knockout or a Critical Blow at any moment, although he has other shortcomings to compensate.

Sho: 18 years old, he represents the Northeast area and is still a high school student. He enjoys any lively activity as a hobby, and is very laid-back, known for loitering around. However, he has a keen interest in music, and would like to become a musician after retiring from sports, secretly hoping he could be a singer. Sho wears a Yellow and Black Taekwondo dobok and wears a distinctive pony tail. In-game his hair is light brown, but the booklet illustration depicts him as auburn-haired. In the game's artwork he is depicted as smoking, and wearing a leather jacket, jeans, sunglasses and dog-tags, showcasing his laid-back personality and perhaps hinting at a back story involving the military. He is known for using a lot of flashy and conspicuous, attention-grabbing techniques, as such he is a "Jump" type character. Jump fighters are known for having superior stability and have good jumping attacks. Most of his normal techniques are also aerial kicks.

Yagami: 20 years old, he represents the Chūgoku and Shikoku region, and at present is a school student. His hobby is playing the Chinese board game Mahjong, which he is very passionate about. His great wish was to be accepted into a certain University, and cheerfully notes "I passed the test!". Yagami wears an Orange and Black Taekwondo dobok and fashions his brown hair into bangs falling to the sides of his face. In the booklet he is depicted as red-haired, carrying his school backpack and sporting a laid-back outfit. Yagami is a "Skill" type character and as such has a decent variety of moves and a good string attack.

Ichijyo: At 26 years old, he is the oldest of the main characters. He hails from the Hokuriku region and works as a bank clerk, although his hobby is computer programming. Ichijyo likes to plan ahead and considers power to come from stability. He is happy being safe and secure even if some think of him as plain. He plays a strategic match. Like Lee, he sports a White and Black Taekwondo dobok, and is brown haired. In the booklet artwork, he is depicted as blue-eyed, wearing glasses and sporting a business suit whilst speaking on a cell phone. Ichijyo is an "All around" type character and as such has no glaring shortcomings as a fighter.

Duyile: An Okinawan 22 year old College student whose hobby is reading. An underdog, he challenged the preconceived notions about him and became a Dark Horse amongst the tournament fighters. He employs the hard to integrate Halfmoon kick. Despite his cool exterior, he is the hottest Taekwondo star at the moment. Duyile wears a Blue and Black Taekwondo dobok and slicks his brown hair back with some bangs at the front. In the booklet he is wearing a conservative sweater whilst reading. Duyile is the game's first "Defense" type fighter and as such, defense is his main attribute, reducing his opponent's power stat when fought.

Kyoji: At 16, he's the youngest fighter in the game and he's still a high schooler, hailing from the Hokkaido region. Kyoji seems to love speed and his hobby is biking. It seems that Kyoji was suspended in the past for excess contact, perhaps hinting at his impulsiveness and short tempered, as he is depicted cross-armed and with an impatient scowl in-game. He is one of the fastest fighters around, with movements approaching 150 km in speed. Kyoji is the game's first "Speed" type character, and as such relies on his quick movement and rush-down attacks to compensate his lack of power.

== See also ==
- List of fighting games
