= Egypt (1991 video game) =

- Developer(s): Human Creative
- Publisher(s): Human
- Composer(s): Masamichi Yamazaki; Hiroyuki Sekiguchi; Tohru Hayashi
- Platform(s): Family Computer
- Release: JP: May 31, 1991
- Genre(s): Puzzle
- Mode(s): Single-player

Egypt (エジプト, Ejiputo) is a puzzle video game released for the Family Computer in 1991 by Human. It was released only in Japan. It is an object elimination type puzzle game. A player controls a spherical jewel and jumps from tile to tile. Stepping on an arrow shifts a row or column in the direction of the arrow. Placing two or more of the same object next to each other will erase them from the board, and this must be repeated until all the objects have been eliminated from the board.

== Story ==
An Indiana Jones style explorer is trapped inside an ancient Egyptian temple. He meets a goddess who is so low in power that she can only take the form of a large, spherical jewel. He enters the jewel to restore her power by clearing each level.

== Gameplay ==
The game is played on an 8x8 tiled grid. The player controls the large spherical jewel and can move around with the directional pad. The player can step on any type of tile except a wall. A tile can be either an empty space, a wall, an object, or an arrow.

=== Shifting the map ===
When the player steps on an arrow, the row or column of the map is shifted in the direction of the arrow. For example, stepping on an up-arrow shifts the column containing the arrow, while stepping on a right-arrow shifts the row. Shifting a row or column does not move the player, so it appears that the map is shifting beneath the player. Arrows can be stepped on multiple times. When a tile is pushed off the edge of the map, it wraps around to the other side.

=== Eliminating objects ===
When a row or column is shifted, the objects are shifted as well. If two or more objects come into contact, they are eliminated. Eliminating all the objects moves the player to the next level. If there is only one object of any type remaining, the level is unfinishable, since there is no other object with which to eliminate it.

=== Items ===
On the two easier levels of the game, the player can use items to assist with solving the levels. Items do not exist on the Hard difficulty mode. The use of items is not necessary to complete the game, as every level is solvable without items.

- Lightning Bolt - destroys all walls within a 3x3 area surrounding the player. This does not wrap around to the opposite edges.
- Feather - the player flies up into the air and can move freely up to five times without hitting walls or activating arrows.
- Flash - destroys all walls on a level.

== Legacy ==
A translation group named "Dodgy Translations" has produced an English translation patch.
