= The Conveni =

1996 video game

- PlayStation box art
- Developer: Masterpiece
- Publisher: Human Entertainment
- Series: The Conveni
- Platforms: Windows, PlayStation, Sega Saturn
- Release: JP: 1996
- Genre: Business simulation
- Mode: Single-player

The Conveni (Note: Japanese: ザ・コンビニ ～あの町を独占せよ～, Hepburn: Za Konbini ～ Ano Machi O Dokusen Seyo ～; lit. "The Convenience Store ~ Monopolize That Town ~") is a 1996 business simulation video game developed by Masterpiece and published by Human Entertainment for Windows. It was ported to the PlayStation and Sega Saturn in 1997. It was successful enough to receive numerous sequels, including The Conveni 200X. Hamster Corporation acquired the series and published future sequels after Human Entertainment went defunct in 2000. Hamster Corporation released the game as part of their Console Archives series for the Nintendo Switch 2 and PlayStation 5 in July 2026. Masterpiece remade the game as The Conveni 3 for the PlayStation 2 and Windows in 2003.

== Gameplay ==
The Conveni is a simulation game played from a top-down perspective, where the player takes on the role of a store manager overseeing a convenience store, stocking various items to increase customer footfall, managing the store's accounts, and hiring or firing employees. Once the first location is successful enough, the player can start opening and managing more stores. The game's main objective is to attempting to expand the store's presence through business franchising until the player runs the entire retail empire.
