= Android Assault: The Revenge of Bari-Arm =

1993 video game

- North American cover art
- Developer: Human Entertainment
- Publishers: JP: Human Entertainment; NA: Big Fun Games
- Director: Keisuke Ōuchi
- Designers: Hiroshi Taniguchi; Hiroshi Ichikawa; Keisuke Ōuchi
- Programmer: Jun Hirata
- Artist: Hiroshi Ichikawa
- Composer: Nobuhiro Makino
- Platform: Sega CD
- Release: JP: July 30, 1993; NA: October 1994
- Genre: Shoot 'em up
- Mode: Single-player

Android Assault: The Revenge of Bari-Arm, released in Japan as Bari-Arm (バリ・アーム), is a 1993 shoot 'em up video game developed and published by Human Entertainment for the Sega CD.

== Story ==
Humanity makes advances in space travel and colonization. In the year 2192 however, the colonists near Jupiter are attacked by the independent military nation of Zias stationed on the Olympus colony of Saturn. Zias uses a symbiotic computer system and several mecha factories powered by a device called the GEO as their primary attack force. Human scientists study the Zias technology and, based on the Zias GEO system, became able to build a space fighter capable of fighting against the Zias: the Bari-arm, a space ship capable of using multiple weapons and transforming into a giant robot with the same capabilities as the Zias cyborgs. Bari-arm is piloted by two young pilots with the mission of destroying the new GEO system before the Zias war machines destroy any further colonies and eradicate humanity forever.

== Gameplay ==
Players control the Bari-arm through seven shooting stages. The Bari-arm has four ship speed levels and is equipped with a fully automatic shot and a charge weapon. The charge weapon automatically charges when the player does not hold down the fire button. The charge weapon unleashes a stronger version of whichever weapon the player has equipped. Weapons are collected as icons in the stage. The weapons available to the ship included the Thunder Cracker, Chase Cannon, Burning Wave and the Satellite Bombs. Every weapon covers the front and back of the ship except the Burning Wave, the only primary straight firing weapon.

== Reception ==
GamePro gave the game a negative review, commenting that it is decent but outdated, especially when compared to other CD-based shooters, and is too derivative in every respect to be worthwhile for players who have played any of the dozens of shooters which preceded it. Electronic Gaming Monthly gave it a 6.2 out of 10. They praised the soundtrack but criticized that the graphics are mediocre for a CD-based game.
