= Nage Libre: Seijaku no Suishin =

1995 video game

- Cover art
- Publisher(s): Varie
- Composer(s): Yusuke Takahama; Michihiko Shichi
- Platform(s): Super Famicom
- Release: JP: February 24, 1995
- Genre(s): Strategy involving breeding/constructing
- Mode(s): Single-player

Nage Libre: Seijaku no Suishin (ナージュリーブル 〜静寂の水深〜, lit. "The Silent Depths" NAGE LIBRE") is a 1995 Japan-exclusive video game for the Super Famicom.

In 1997, Nage Libre: Rasen no Soukoku was released for the PlayStation.

== Summary ==
Five nymphs stray off into a different world called "Nage." They constantly fight in order to return to their homeworld.

The fighting techniques all utilize a card battle system that is similar to the anime series Yu-Gi-Oh!, and their incredible offensive and defensive skills develops from the strategies learned from the card games. Since the nymphs are in high school, the kind of extracurricular activities selected when the stage begins will affect their attacking abilities. Their battle commands include: stand by, attack, item, exchange, pocketbell, anime, and save. Each card can attack the player's attack abilities in addition to their defense, hit points, and even their costumes.

== Reception ==
On release, Famicom Tsūshin scored the game a 23 out of 40.
