= Nakajima Satoru F-1 Hero 2 =

1991 video game

- Cover art
- Developer(s): Human Entertainment
- Publisher(s): Varie
- Series: Satoru Nakajima Formula One
- Platform(s): Family Computer
- Release: JP: September 27, 1991
- Genre(s): Formula One racing
- Mode(s): Single-player

Nakajima Satoru F-1 Hero 2 (中嶋悟監修 F-1ヒーロー2) is a 1991 Japan-exclusive Family Computer Formula One video game developed by Human Entertainment and published by Varie. It is the sequel to Nakajima Satoru F-1 Hero, and is based on the 1991 Formula One season. There are 16 rounds and only four cars to choose from.
