= Tadaima Yūsha Boshūchū Okawari =

1994 video game

- Developer: Human Entertainment
- Publisher: Human Entertainment
- Composers: Yayoi Okumura; Hideto Maeda; Shunichi Sigematu; Nobuo Fujii
- Platform: Super Famicom
- Release: JP: November 25, 1994
- Genre: Role-playing
- Modes: Single-player, multiplayer

Tadaima Yūsha Boshūchū Okawari (ただいま勇者募集中おかわり) is a 1994 role-playing video game developed and published by Human Entertainment for the Super Famicom.
