= F1 Circus =

Video game series

- Front cover of the PC Engine version of F1 Circus, the first version of the first game in the series.
- Genre: Simulation-style racing games
- Developers: Nichibutsu; Make Software (Famicom title); Micronics (Mega Drive title); Cream (Super Famicom titles)
- Publisher: Nichibutsu

F1 Circus (エフワン サーカス) is a series of Formula One-based racing video games developed and published by Nichibutsu starting on the PC Engine in 1990.

== Games ==
The following is a list of games released in the series. None of the series was released outside Japan. The initial games did not feature any licensing, with F1 Circus Special - Pole to Win and Super F1 Circus featuring only Team Lotus license, as Nichibutsu was a sponsor of the team at the time; Super F1 Circus Limited was the first in the series with a full FIA/FOCA license, but the last two games in the series, Super F1 Circus Gaiden and Formula Circus, featured completely fictional teams.

Japanese title	English title	System	Year	Season featured
エフワン サーカス	F1 Circus	PC Engine; Famicom	September 14, 1990; February 7, 1992	1990 (TG-16); 1991 (FC)
エフワン サーカス'91	F1 Circus '91	PC Engine	July 12, 1991	1991
エフワン サーカス エムディ	F1 Circus MD	Sega Mega Drive	December 24, 1991	1991
エフワン サーカス・スペシャル ポールトゥウイン	F1 Circus Special - Pole to Win	PC Engine Super CD-ROM²	June 26, 1992	1992
スーパー エフワン サーカス	Super F1 Circus	Super Famicom	July 24, 1992	1991
スーパー エフワン サーカス リミテッド	Super F1 Circus Limited	Super Famicom	October 23, 1992	1992
エフワンサーカス'92	F1 Circus '92	PC Engine	December 18, 1992	1992
スーパー エフワン サーカス2	Super F1 Circus 2	Super Famicom	July 29, 1993	1993
F1サーカスCD	F1 Circus CD	Sega Mega-CD	March 18, 1994	1991-1993
スーパー エフワン サーカス3	Super F1 Circus 3	Super Famicom	July 14, 1994	1994
スーパー エフワン サーカス外伝	Super F1 Circus Gaiden	Super Famicom	July 7, 1995	N/A
フォーミュラ・サーカス	Formula Circus	PlayStation	May 2, 1997	N/A

== See also ==
- F-1 Grand Prix (video game series)
- F-1 Spirit
- Satoru Nakajima F-1 Hero GB World Championship '91
