= Varie =

Japanese video game publisher and developer

Varie (バリエ) was a Japanese corporation that developed and published games for the Game Boy, Famicom, the Super Famicom, and the Sega Mega Drive during the 1980s and the 1990s. It was founded in 1986 and closed in early 1997.

== History ==
The company was established on November 18, 1987. The president of the company was Katsumasa Shimizu. Varie games were technically published by Kaken Corporation, a company that previously made video games. Some of the most popular Varie games were games endorsed or licensed by F1 racer Satoru Nakajima and Shin Nihon Pro Wrestling. The company had produced two PlayStation 1 games before they became defunct in 1997.

== Notable games ==
=== Nintendo Consoles ===
- Grand Master (Famicom)
- Top Rider (Famicom)
- Venus Senki (Famicom)
- Parallel World (Famicom)
- Nakajima Satoru: F-1 Hero (Famicom)
- Nakajima Satoru F-1 Hero 2 (Famicom)
- Satoru Nakajima F-1 Hero GB World Championship '91 (Game Boy)
- Super F1 Hero (Super Famicom)
- Nakajima Satoru F-1 Hero '94 (Super Famicom)
- Asahi Shinbun Rensai - Katou Ichi-Ni-San Shougi - Shingiryuu (Super Famicom)
- Shin Nippon Pro Wrestling: Chou Senshi in Tokyo Dome (Super Famicom) - 1993
- Shin Nippon Pro Wrestling '94: Battlefield in Tokyo Dome (Super Famicom)
- Shin Nippon Pro Wrestling '95: Tokyo Dome Battle 7 (Super Famicom)
- Shin Nippon Pro Wrestling: Toukon Sanjushi (Game Boy)
- Table Game Daisyugo!! Shogi Mahjong Hanafuda (Super Famicom)
- Nage Libre: Seijaku no Suishin (Super Famicom)
- Putty Moon (Super Famicom)
- Undercover Cops (Super Famicom)
- Stardust Suplex (Super Famicom)
- Yuujin: Janjyu Gakuen (Super Famicom)
- Yuujin: Janjyu Gakuen 2 (Super Famicom)

=== Sega Consoles ===
- F1 Grand Prix: Nakajima Satoru (Mega Drive)
- F1 Super License: Nakajima Satoru (Mega Drive)
- Ferrari Grand Prix Challenge (Mega Drive)

=== Sony Consoles ===
- Nage Libre-Rasen no Soukoku (PlayStation)

=== Handheld Games ===
- Splatterhouse
- Dragon Spirit
- Family Stadium
- Pac-Land
- Galaga '91 (port of Galaga '88)
