= Thunder Pro Wrestling Retsuden =

1992 video game

- Cover art
- Developer: Human Entertainment
- Publisher: Human Entertainment
- Series: Fire Pro Wrestling
- Platform: Mega Drive
- Release: JP: March 27, 1992
- Genre: Sports
- Modes: Single-player, multiplayer

Thunder Pro Wrestling Retsuden (サンダープロレスリング列伝, Sanda Puro Resuringu Retsuden; "Thunder Pro Wrestling Biographies") is a Japan-exclusive Sega Mega Drive professional wrestling video game. This is the only game in the Fire Pro Wrestling series to be released for that system.

The game features an "Exciting" mode that allows players to take on each other, an elimination mode where ten chosen wrestlers compete to win, and a handicap mode where one wrestler must take on two opponents.

A North American release under the name Jesse "The Body" Ventura Wrestling Superstars was planned by DreamWorks, but was never released for unknown reasons.
