= Air Boarder 64 =

1998 video game

- Japanese box art
- Developer: Human Entertainment
- Publishers: JP: Human Entertainment; EU: Gaga Interactive Media
- Composer: Masafumi Takada
- Platform: Nintendo 64
- Release: JP: March 27, 1998; EU: November 1998
- Genre: Racing
- Modes: Single-player, multiplayer

Air Boarder 64 (Note: Japanese: エアボーダー64, Hepburn: Ea Bōdā 64) is a futuristic hoverboard racing game for the Nintendo 64 developed by Human Entertainment and released in Japan and Europe in 1998. It was to be released under the name AirBoardin' USA in North America by ASCII Entertainment, but was cancelled.

== Gameplay ==
Air Boarder 64 rewards players for scoring the most points by performing stunt moves in an environment featuring skate park mainstays such as rails and halfpipes. Scoring enough points will earn the player additional levels of competition, and higher scores can be awarded from exploring the game's setting to find high-scoring jumps. Other game modes include Versus Race, Time Attack, Coin Challenge, and Stunt Mode.

== Development ==
On July 11, 2000, the release date for the North American version of Air Boarder 64, titled Air Boardin' USA, was pushed back to February 17, 2001. On November 9, 2000, IGN announced that the North American version of the game had been cancelled.

== Reception ==
Reception

Review scores
Publication	Score
Consoles +	83%
Edge	5/10
Electronic Gaming Monthly	2.125/10 (Note: Electronic Gaming Monthly's review was by four critics, two that gave it a 1.5/10, one a 2/10 and another a 3.5/10.)
Hyper	69/100
Joypad	3/10
N64 Magazine	58%
Nintendo Power	6.9/10
Official Nintendo Magazine	69%

Air Boarder 64 received mixed reviews upon its release. Nintendo Power gave it a 6.9 overall rating, stating that its graphics looked "fairly sharp, but the game lacks some of the special effects that are common in the latest generation of N64 titles" and that its sound "completely fails to rock." In comparing the game to 1080° Snowboarding, Tim Weaver of N64 Magazine said that "its similarity to 1080° begins and ends with the fact that both games feature a board." Weaver, whose review scored the game at 58%, went on to criticize the game's main mode, extra modes, camera controls, course design, and lack of a race mode akin to Mario Kart 64. Nintendo Official Magazine drew similarities to 1080° Snowboarding in its 69% review, stating that "There is no comparison between Airboarder 64 and 1080°. It's slow, play controls are too basic and there's little challenge."
