= Nakajima Satoru Kanshū F1 Hero MD =

1992 video game

- Packaging for the Japanese Mega Drive version.
- Developers: Aisystem Tokyo(Genesis); System 3 (GB/NES)
- Publishers: Mega Drive: JP: Varie; NA/EU: Acclaim Entertainment (Note: Released under the Flying Edge label.); Game Boy/NES: JP: Coconuts Japan; NA/EU: Acclaim Entertainment
- Programmer: Richard Chappells (GB)
- Artist: Rosey (GB)
- Composers: Neil Baldwin (NES); Mark Cooksey (GB)
- Series: Satoru Nakajima; Ferrari
- Platforms: Mega Drive, Game Boy, Nintendo Entertainment System
- Release: Mega Drive: JP: May 15, 1992; NA: 1992; EU: September 1992; Game Boy: JP: November 13, 1992; EU: 1992; NA: 1992; Nintendo Entertainment System: NA: June 1992; EU: 1992; JP: November 13, 1992
- Genre: Racing
- Mode: Single-player

Nakajima Satoru Kanshū F1 Hero MD (中島悟監修 F1 HERO MD) is a racing video game that was released in 1992 for the Mega Drive/Genesis, Nintendo Entertainment System, and Game Boy. It is endorsed by Formula One driver Satoru Nakajima. The North American and European versions of the game are known as Ferrari Grand Prix Challenge in reference to Ferrari, specifically their Formula One team.

== Gameplay ==
=== Mega Drive/Genesis version ===
The Mega Drive version of the game includes a Grand Prix mode, a free practice mode, and a time attack mode. The team and player names are close to the real thing without violating copyright laws. Either one or two players can compete and the game has a password method of saving the game. In addition to traditional tracks used in the 1992 season (although both versions of the game features teams from the 1991 season), the player can also play in bonus race tracks. Autopolis, Fuji Speedway, an oval training course, and a treacherous road course originally designed by the programmers of the video game used in the Japanese version.

It is one of only three Mega Drive games that supports the AX-1E analog controller.

The North American version uses the former location of the Long Beach Grand Prix, the Mid-Ohio Sports Car Course, Oyster Bay (as the name of the fictional track), and the Indianapolis Motor Speedway as American-specific substitutes for the tracks considered "local" to Japanese audiences. However, the graphics used for the backgrounds are identical to each other in both versions of the game. Additionally, the team names were altered so that Scuderia Ferrari is explicitly named such to match the title of the localized game, and the courses reflected the 1991 season instead of the 1992 season the Japanese version had.

=== NES and Game Boy versions ===
The title Ferrari Grand Prix Challenge was also ported for the Game Boy and Nintendo Entertainment System. It was developed by System 3 and published by Acclaim in North America and Europe. Coconuts Japan published the game in Japan under the title Ferrari (フェラーリ).

The Nintendo Entertainment System version of the game is a simplified version that allows players to practice up to six laps or qualify for every Formula One race of the season using metric units (kilometres per hour instead of miles per hour). It was one of the few 8-bit Formula One video games to adequately represent the Circuit Gilles Villeneuve as having an urban background along with several other urban race tracks represented in the 1990 Formula One season with the exception that Circuit de Catalunya is presented in this version as the round in Spain, although Jerez hosted the 1990 Spanish Grand Prix. Tire wear is possible resulting in trips to the pit crew for maintenance and repairs. A radio allows communication with the crew chief; he will advise whether repairs are necessary. The top speed of the vehicle is 335 kilometres per hour and turbo is not used in the game.

Before the first qualifying session can take place, the player must insert his name and his nationality. The name can be up to 10 characters long and the country has to fit into a three-character field. Since the game doesn't verify if the three-letter code matches up to a real nationality, it doesn't matter if the player makes up a nationality for a fictional country.
