= Fastest 1 =

1991 video game

- Box art of Fastest 1
- Developer: Human Entertainment
- Publisher: Human Entertainment
- Designers: Yuichi Kobayashi; Masato Masuda
- Platform: Sega Mega Drive
- Release: JP: June 28, 1991
- Genre: Formula One racing simulation
- Modes: Single-player, multiplayer

Fastest 1 (ファステスト・ワン) is a Sega Mega Drive racing game video game released in 1991 exclusively in Japan. During the release of this video game, other Formula One video games like Super Monaco GP had caused a general increase of demand for Formula One video games. While most of those games were poor simulations of the races, Fastest One proved to be the most realistic of the era.

The game was based on Formula One racing and featured team and driver names similar to the real life namesakes. A choice of up to 18 playable vehicles could be used in every mode provided. Six vehicles in the game used Ford engines, displaying American ingenuity during the 1990 Formula One season. The language of the game was English.

Most of the Formula One drivers who participated in the 1990 Formula One season were represented, with slightly altered names (e.g., Satoru Nakajima made an appearance as "S. Inakajima").

== Gameplay ==
This is a player doing free practice in preparation for the next race.

A player could participate in as many seasons as desired the championship mode. The player started out the first season with a "D" level (least desirable) team. Only by winning races did the player get promoted to the more desirable teams of the "C", "B", and "A" levels. A player could modify the steering, gear box, tires, wings, and color of their chosen racing vehicle.

Fastest 1 emphasized simulated Formula One action over arcade-style gameplay. The cornering was harsher that most games released at that time and the player had to shift from neutral, even in cars with automatic transmission, in order for the vehicle to start moving. All modes of the game can accommodated only a single player (except for battle mode which could have up to two players play against up to two computer opponents). In order to race, the player had to attend free practice followed by qualifying in the eight positions (although the player was given two chances to do so). If the player failed to qualify for the race, the player had to instead watch the race as a spectator.

A player could also watch four computer opponents face off in the battle mode of the game. There was a battery save for all progress that is made during the game. Generic billboards appeared as obstacles that the player must avoid.

== Reception ==
Reception

Review score
Publication	Score
MegaTech	29%
