= Al Unser Jr.'s Turbo Racing =

1989 video game

- North American cover art
- Developer: Data East
- Publisher: Data East
- Director: Ken Fukaki
- Producer: Tokinori Kaneyasu
- Programmer: Yoshi Nakamura
- Composers: Shogo Sakai; Takafumi Miura; Masaaki Iwasaki; Yuji Suzuki
- Platform: Nintendo Entertainment System
- Release: JP: January 31, 1989; NA: March 1990; EU: 1991
- Genre: Racing
- Mode: Single-player

Al Unser Jr.'s Turbo Racing is a racing video game released by Data East for the Nintendo Entertainment System in 1990. It is an adaptation of the 1989 Japanese-market Famicom game World Grand Prix - Pole to Finish (ワールドグランプリ ポールトゥフィニッシュ, Wārudo Guran Puri Pōru tu Finisshu), with the most notable changes being the addition of Unser as an in-game coach, the number of laps, sound and interface design. Therefore, the game remains based on the Formula 1 World Championship, despite Unser having never competed in it. This game features a season mode and two time trial modes. In season mode the player uses either Al Unser Jr. or a make-their-own-driver.

Versions released outside North America were simply titled Turbo Racing with all references to Al Unser Jr removed, due to the relative obscurity of CART and Al Unser Jr outside of North America.

== Gameplay ==
The game is a racing video game. The player directs the car using the D-pad, accelerating with A and braking with B. The gauges, speed, and several other things can be seen at the bottom of the screen. Turbo boosts can be used by the player when necessary, but must be refuelled when empty. Hazards such as signposts and other cars must be avoided. Qualifying is held prior to each race, but is difficult because only one lap is given.

Due to the limitations of the NES, curves appear to come out of nowhere, making turning unusually difficult.

== Modes ==
=== World Championship Season ===
Players choosing the World Championship Season can either race as Al Unser, Jr., or start their own team. Playing as Unser, Jr. gives the player the best car possible and the best chance to win immediately. If a players choose to start their own team, they would have to spend a season climbing up the rankings, improving the car. Players run a full 16-race schedule, with several races varying in distance.

If a player drives as Unser, Jr., he takes his likeness, and drives the blue and white Valvoline Lola-Chevrolet. If a player starts his or her own team, a name is entered, and personalized team colours are chosen. Unser, Jr.'s car is maxed out for set-up points, and a new entry starts with minimal set-up points. The remainder of the championship season is filled with fictional drivers, bringing the total to 26 cars per race.

At each race, the player has the chance to receive advice about the course from Al Unser, Jr., and set up the car to qualify. Unlimited practice is also allowed prior to qualifying. During qualifying, a player must complete one lap as fast as possible to determine the starting position on the grid. If a player qualifies fastest, he will start on the pole position. If a player retires from qualifying, he will start last (26th). The player is allowed one last opportunity to set up the car for the race, and choose the music to be played during the race. The race begins from a standing start, and runs a specific number of laps.

For each race, points towards the championship are awarded to the top six finishers (9-6-4-3-2-1), consistent with the points system utilized in Formula One at the time. The top six finishers also receive a certain number of set-up points to improve the car. At the end of the season, the driver with the most points wins the World Championship.

During each race, the player must avoid accidents such as running into other cars and hitting signposts. Accidents can harm engines or blow tires, which can be repaired by pitting. While pitting, the race is halted so as not to put the player at a disadvantage due to each race's unusually short length (about three to five laps).

The game uses a turbo boost system, which, when depleted, must be refilled before it causes engine damage.

=== Time trial mode ===
The game features two time trial modes, "A" (with computer opponents) and "B" (without computer opponents). Players can choose any of the sixteen tracks, and number of laps (1-9). The gameplay is the same as that of the World Championship season. The fastest lap would be recorded for each session. As many as four players can run the time trial, one at a time, and the best laps are recorded for comparison.

== Reception ==
Reception

Review score
Publication	Score
Electronic Gaming Monthly	7/10, 4/10, 5/10, 7/10

== See also ==
- Al Unser Jr.
- Al Unser Jr.'s Road to the Top
- Michael Andretti's World GP
- Danny Sullivan's Indy Heat
