= The Firemen =

1994 video game

- Developer: Human Entertainment
- Publisher: Human Entertainment
- Designer: Taichi Ishizuka
- Programmer: Nobuhiro Fujii
- Artists: Eiji Tokumori; Masayuki Yoshioka; Yuuichi Shimizu
- Composers: Hideto Maeda; Hironori Tanaka; Hiroyuki Naka
- Series: The Firemen
- Platform: Super Nintendo Entertainment System
- Release: JP: September 9, 1994; PAL: May–June 1995
- Genre: Action-adventure
- Mode: Single-player

The Firemen (Note: Japanese: ザ・ファイヤーメン, Hepburn: Za Faiyāmen) is an action video game developed and published by Human Entertainment for the Super Nintendo Entertainment System. It was first released in Japan in 1994, and then in Europe and Australia in 1995. In The Firemen, the player controls firemen who fight fires and save civilians. A sequel was released for the PlayStation in 1995 titled The Firemen 2: Pete & Danny.

== Gameplay ==
Gameplay screenshot

The characters in the game put out fires using hoses with the ability to shoot a direct stream or have a more proximate spray and fire-extinguishing bombs. Use of the fire extinguisher is unlimited although continues are limited in number to 3. Pete takes damage from fire and extreme heat, and when the life gauge reaches zero, and there are no more continues, the game is over. Each level has a "boss fire" that has a specific way of being extinguished. There are also civilians who were not able to escape throughout the levels, and saving them partially restores the player's life gauge.

The player controls Pete Grey, who is joined by his partner, Daniel McClean. Daniel is invincible and provides backup to Pete. Other characters include fellow firefighters Max and Walter, who are fighting fires in another part of the building, Winona, who communicates advice and missions to the firefighters, and Frank Weller, architect of the Metrotech building.

== Story ==
When a large fire breaks out in the middle of a Christmas party at the chemical company Metrotech, firemen Pete and Daniel, along with a second pair of firefighters in another part of the building, are tasked with saving civilians, putting out fires, and removing an explosive chemical called MDL from the basement of the facility.

== Release ==
The game was released in Japan on September 9, 1994 for the Super Famicom. It was later released in Europe between May and June of 1995.

In 1995, The Firemen 2: Pete & Danny (ザ・ファイヤーメン2 ピート & ダニー) was released in Japan for the PlayStation.

== Reception ==
Reception

Review scores
Publication	Score
Consoles +	86%
Computer and Video Games	93/100
Famitsu	8/10, 7/10, 8/10, 8/10
Joypad	85%
M! Games	58%
Mega Fun	66%
Player One	68%
Superjuegos	87/100
Super Play	75%
Total!	87/100 (UK); 2- (DE)
Video Games (DE)	80%
Nintendo Acción	89/100
Play Time	66%
The Super Famicom	72/100
Super Gamer	87/100
Top Consoles	14/20
Última Generación	76/100
Ultra Player	4/6

Awards
Publication	Award
Famitsu (1994)	Silver Hall of Fame
Total! (1995)	#76 Top 100 SNES Games

The Firemen garnered generally favorable reception from critics, and was given the "Silver Hall of Fame" award from Famitsu. It received a 21.5 out of 30 score in a public poll taken by Family Computer Magazine. According to Famitsu, the game sold over 16,812 copies in its first week on the market. The title sold approximately 30,137 copies during its lifetime in Japan. Joypad's Nini Nourdine praised the game's originality, controls, and gripping gameplay, but criticized the lack of multiplayer and occasional sprite flickering. Consoles +' Nicolas Gavet and Alain Huyghues-Lacour agreed with Nini regarding the lack of a two-player mode and found the overall difficulty low. Nevertheless, Gavet and Huyghues-Lacour commended the game's presentation, graphics, lack of slowdown, music, varied sound effects.

Player One's Stéphane Pilet concurred with both Gavet and Huyghues-Lacour about the game's difficulty but commended its soundtrack, visuals, and originality. Total!'s Atko and Andy recommended the game but were critical of its short length and linearity. Writing for the German edition, Michael Anton agreed with both Atko and Andy in regards to the length, which he felt was its weak point, but ultimately recommended the game. MAN!AC's Martin Gaksch said that while it was somewhat exciting, there was only one setting and the levels seemed too similar.

Mega Fun's Stefan Hellert and Play Time's Stephan Girlich found the game more action-focused and suitable for beginners compared to Jaleco's The Ignition Factor due to its straightforward structure, which was faulted for being unimaginative and lacking innovation, while echoing similar thoughts as other reviewers about its low difficulty. Top Consoles' Street Man highlighted the game's colorful visuals and French translation, but noted its short length and lack of variety in the action. Video Games' Robert Zengerle commended the game's graphical effects, sound, and controls. Ultra Player's Denis Adloff shared a similar opinion of its length as other reviewers, but recommended the game regardless.

Nintendo Acción's Javier Abad commended its detailed sprites, sound effects, simple movement, controls, and originality. However, Abad felt that the music did match the intensity of the action, while stating that the game should have been longer and more difficult. Super Gamer's Jonathan Evans and Hayden Jones criticized the lack of a two-player option and repetitive setting, but gave positive remarks to the graphics and playability. Superjuegos's Bruno Sol lauded the game's audiovisual presentation and simple controls, but noted its difficulty as well. Última Generación's José Luis Sanz stated that "The Firemen is old in ideas and treats correctly, by approaches and subsequent realization, a development that no one can escape because it is fun and playable."

In 1995, Total! ranked the game as number 76 on its list of the top 100 SNES games, writing: "Same over head view as Chaos Engine, this is a quirky little game in which you play a fireman." Hardcore Gaming 101 wrote "It's a great looking game overall, if a bit basic. Couple that with fairly decent music, and its intense gameplay, and you've got one of the best overhead action games of the 16-bit era." Destructoid's Allistair Pinsof called the game "oddly addictive" and the AI partner "surprisingly effective", calling it "the definitive firefighter-themed action game". IGN Spain's Juan García also gave it a positive retrospective outlook.
