= F1 Pole Position 2 =

1993 video game

- European cover art
- Developer: Human Entertainment
- Publishers: JP: Human Entertainment; EU: Ubi Soft
- Director: Hifumi Kouno
- Producer: Shūji Yoshida
- Designer: Takahiro Uchiyama
- Programmer: Ryūichi Itō
- Artist: Takeshi Kadoma
- Composers: Kouji Niikura; Masamichi Yamazaki
- Series: Human Grand Prix
- Platform: Super Nintendo Entertainment System
- Release: JP: December 24, 1993; EU: October 1994
- Genre: Racing
- Mode: Single-player

F1 Pole Position 2, known in Japan as Human Grand Prix II (ヒューマングランプリ２; lit. "Human Grand Prix 2"), is the sequel to Human Grand Prix and the predecessor to Human Grand Prix III: F1 Triple Battle.

== Gameplay ==
Satoru Nakajima is introduced to the series as a hidden character that can be saved to either of the two provided files. This relationship would continue until Human Grand Prix IV: F1 Dream Battle was released.

It is possible to edit the contracts for the engine manufacturers in addition to the individual players and their respective contracts, with the game also including the 1992 Honda RA122E as a selectable engine. The engines in this game look similar to those of Human Grand Prix III and Human Grand Prix IV. Licensing was possible by Fuji Television and FOCA. World Grand Prix mode allows the player to re-enact the 1993 season. Battle mode allows for a single race to take place against up to 13 CPU-controlled players. Finally, time attack mode allows players to practice on the tracks. There is a guiding arrow for turns that allow players to correctly judge how much pressure that they can put on the turns. This feature is used in other Human Grand Prix games.

== Drivers and teams ==
Team	Driver
(United Kingdom) Williams F1 Team	(United Kingdom) Damon Hill
(United Kingdom) Williams F1 Team	(France) Alain Prost
(United Kingdom) Tyrrell Racing	(Japan) Ukyo Katayama
(United Kingdom) Tyrrell Racing	(Italy) Andrea de Cesaris
(United Kingdom) Benetton Formula	(Germany) Michael Schumacher
(United Kingdom) Benetton Formula	(Italy) Riccardo Patrese
(United Kingdom) McLaren Racing	(United States) Michael Andretti
(United Kingdom) McLaren Racing	(Finland) Mika Häkkinen
(United Kingdom) Footwork Racing	(United Kingdom) Derek Warwick
(United Kingdom) Footwork Racing	(Japan) Aguri Suzuki
(Italy) Scuderia Ferrari	(France) Jean Alesi
(Italy) Scuderia Ferrari	(Austria) Gerhard Berger
(Switzerland) Sauber	(Austria) Karl Wendlinger
(Switzerland) Sauber	(Finland) JJ Lehto

The McLaren team does not feature triple World Champion Ayrton Senna, instead Michael Andretti and the driver who would replace him later that season, Mika Häkkinen, are featured. However, Senna's face is included in the game's Edit mode for use with custom drivers, of which two can be saved in a cartridge.

In addition to Nakajima, 1992 World Champion Nigel Mansell also appears as free agent driver, of which he, Nakajima, or any of the player-created drivers can be chosen to replace any of the default drivers, but default drivers cannot be swapped across teams. Nelson Piquet was initially featured as one of the free agent drivers according to a cartridge containing an early build of the game, but he was removed from the final game.
