= List of Fire Pro Wrestling games =

The following is a list of all video games in the Fire Pro Wrestling series produced by either Human Entertainment or Spike starting in 1989. Most of the titles in the series were released exclusively in Japan.

== Human Entertainment Games ==
=== Fire Pro Wrestling Combination Tag ===
Fire Pro Wrestling Combination Tag
- Developer: Human Entertainment
- Publisher: Human Entertainment
- Designers: Masato Masuda, Hideaki Sasazawa
- Platforms: PC Engine; Wii
- Release: June 22, 1989 (JP)
- Genres: Fighting, wrestling
- Modes: Single-player, multiplayer

Fire Pro Wrestling Combination Tag is the first game in the series, released for the PC Engine by Human Entertainment on June 22, 1989. The game was later re-released on March 13, 2007, for the Virtual Console on the Wii. The game was only released in Japan, and featured no official license. The game featured singles, tag team and tournament matchup modes.

=== Fire Pro Wrestling 2nd Bout ===
Fire Pro Wrestling 2nd Bout
- Developer: Human Entertainment
- Publisher: Human Entertainment
- Designers: Masato Masuda, Hideaki Sasazawa
- Platforms: PC Engine; Wii
- Release: August 30, 1991 (JP)
- Genres: Fighting, wrestling
- Modes: Single-player, multiplayer

Fire Pro Wrestling 2nd Bout is the second installment of the series, featuring a few more match types and additional wrestlers than the previous game. It was released two years after the original, featuring a new "World Champion Series", "Super Tournament", and "Elimination Match" modes. The game was later re-released on the Wii Virtual Console on May 27, 2008.

=== Super Fire Pro Wrestling ===
- Developer: Human Entertainment
- Publisher: Human Entertainment
- Director: Goichi Suda
- Platform: Super Famicom
- Release: JP: December 20, 1991
- Genres: Fighting, wrestling
- Modes: Single-player, multiplayer

Super Fire Pro Wrestling was released in 1991 for the Super Famicom system. It was developed by Human Club and published by Human Entertainment.

=== Thunder Pro Wrestling Retsuden ===
Thunder Pro Wrestling Retsuden
- Developer: Human Entertainment
- Publisher: Human Entertainment
- Series: Fire Pro Wrestling
- Platform: Mega Drive
- Release: JP: March 27, 1992
- Genres: Fighting, wrestling
- Modes: Single-player, multiplayer

Thunder Pro Wrestling Retsuden (サンダープロレスリング列伝, Sanda Puro Resuringu Retsuden; "Thunder Pro Wrestling Biographies") was released for the Sega Mega Drive. The game features an "Exciting" mode that allows players to take on each other, an elimination mode where ten chosen wrestlers compete to win, and a handicap mode where one wrestler must take on two opponents. The game was going to be released in the U.S. under the title Jesse "The Body" Ventura Wrestling Superstars, as published by DreamWorks, but was later cancelled. A ROM for the cancelled English version was leaked online in April 2016.

=== Fire Pro Wrestling 3: Legend Bout ===
Fire Pro Wrestling 3: Legend Bout
- Developer: Human Entertainment
- Publisher: Human Entertainment
- Series: Fire Pro Wrestling
- Platform: PC Engine
- Release: JP: November 13, 1992
- Genres: Fighting, wrestling
- Modes: Single-player, multiplayer

=== Super Fire Pro Wrestling 2 ===
Super Fire Pro Wrestling 2
- Developer: Human Entertainment
- Publisher: Human Entertainment
- Series: Fire Pro Wrestling
- Platform: Super Famicom
- Release: JP: December 25, 1992
- Genres: Fighting, wrestling
- Modes: Single-player, multiplayer

=== Super Fire Pro Wrestling 3 Final Bout ===
Super Fire Pro Wrestling 3 Final Bout
- Developer: Human Entertainment
- Publisher: Human Entertainment
- Platform: Super Famicom
- Release: JP: December 28, 1993
- Genres: Fighting, wrestling
- Modes: Single-player, multiplayer

Super Fire Pro Wrestling 3 Final Bout (スーパーファイヤープロレスリング3 ファイナルバウト) was released in 1993. This is the first game ever created with contribution from Goichi Suda. Due to complaints about the game's difficulty, Human released "Super Fire Pro Wrestling 3 Easy Type". In this version there is no edit mode but all of the hidden wrestlers are unlocked.

Characters based on wrestling stars such as WWF's Hulk Hogan and WCW's Rick Rude are featured in the game along with Japanese professional wrestlers like Masahiro Chono. Wrestler Morio Smith is named after Morrissey of The Smiths as Suda is a fan of the band. Each wrestler is ranked based on their attacking ability, defensive ability, and their running speed. An "edit mode" allows customized wrestlers to be created based on their wrestling type, the color of their skin, and a unique set of customized ring attire. A certain number of points also have to be spent on developing certain attacks (and their respective defense against these attacks from opposing wrestlers). Digitized voices from the wrestlers and cheers from the audience members are included. Two of the buttons on the Super Famicom controller are used for strong blows while another button is used strictly for low blows. Sprites in the game actually show wrestlers in different sizes to each other (depending on height and weight). A battle royale mode permits four wrestlers to face off against each other simultaneously. There are 56 different wrestlers to control, with eight playable wrestling legends. Referees are available and can be chosen by the player; each referee has his own level of strictness and essentially determine how long the match will last. It is possible to perform up to 300 different professional wrestling moves in the game.

=== Fire Pro Women: All Star Dream Slam ===
Fire Pro Women: All Star Dream Slam
- Developer: Human Entertainment
- Publisher: Human Entertainment
- Series: Fire Pro Wrestling
- Platform: Super Famicom
- Release: JP: July 22, 1994
- Genres: Fighting, wrestling
- Modes: Single-player, multiplayer

Fire Pro Women is officially licensed by All Japan Women's Pro-Wrestling.

=== Super Fire Pro Wrestling Special ===
Super Fire Pro Wrestling Special
- Developer: Human Entertainment
- Publisher: Human Entertainment
- Designers: Masato Masuda; Goichi Suda; Akihisa Yoshimura; Hiroki Takahashi; Kenji Takaoka; Hiroya Tamura; Masaharu Omi
- Composers: Masamichi Yamazaki; Chiyomaru Shikura; Yukie Sugawara; Shintaro Jyocha
- Platform: Super Famicom
- Release: JP: December 22, 1994
- Genres: Fighting, wrestling
- Modes: Single-player, multiplayer

Super Fire Pro Wrestling Special was released in 1994. Wrestlers from the game are based on popular wrestlers from the WWF in addition to the WCW and several puroresu organizations. The game was only released on the Super Famicom system. The game's scenario was written by Goichi Suda, and helped make him famous with a controversial suicide plotline.

=== Fire Pro Gaiden: Blazing Tornado ===
Blazing Tornado
- Developers: Masato Masuda and team
- Publisher: Human Entertainment
- Designers: Kenji Kimura, Kazuo Komuro
- Platforms: Arcade, Sega Saturn
- Release: 1994 (Arcade); 1995 (Sega Saturn)
- Genres: Fighting, wrestling
- Modes: Single-player, multiplayer

Blazing Tornado was released by Human Entertainment in 1994. Although the design is similar to the majority of the games in the series, the controls are primarily based on button mashing, rather than executing properly-timed button presses. This installment features a different group of 8 (9 with the boss code) pro-wrestlers, who hail from all corners of the globe to compete, seeking to become a champion out of themselves.

Game modes are divided into single and tag team match tournaments. The single division allows players to challenge for the vacant Heroic Wrestling Federation/Neo Heroic Championship.

=== Wrestling Universe: Fire Pro Women: Dome Super Female Big Battle: All Japan Women VS J.W.P. ===
Wrestling Universe: Fire Pro Women: Dome Super Female Big Battle: All Japan Women VS J.W.P.
- Developer: Human Entertainment
- Publisher: Human Entertainment
- Series: Fire Pro Wrestling
- Platform: PC Engine
- Release: JP: February 13, 1995
- Genres: Fighting, wrestling
- Modes: Single-player, multiplayer

Wrestling Universe is officially licensed by All Japan Women's Pro-Wrestling and JWP Joshi Puroresu; it is a collaboration of the all-women's wrestling Tokyo Dome show of the same name that took place in November of the previous year.

=== Super Fire Pro Wrestling X ===
Super Fire Pro Wrestling X
- Developer: Human Entertainment
- Publisher: Human Entertainment
- Series: Fire Pro Wrestling
- Platform: Super Famicom
- Release: JP: December 2, 1995
- Genres: Fighting, wrestling
- Modes: Single-player, multiplayer

=== Fire Pro Wrestling: Iron Slam '96 ===
Fire Pro Wrestling: Iron Slam '96
- Developer: Human Entertainment
- Publisher: Human Entertainment
- Series: Fire Pro Wrestling
- Platform: PlayStation
- Release: JP: March 15, 1996
- Genres: Fighting, wrestling
- Mode: Single-player

Fire Pro Wrestling: Iron Slam '96 was developed and released for the PlayStation by Human Entertainment. It is the first game in the series to be done in full 3D. Its gameplay, however, retains the familiar timing-based grapple system found in all of the other Fire Pro games. Also, as with the other games in the series, the characters are based on real-life wrestlers that were popular at the time. Unlike its predecessors, it lacks the extensive Edit Mode used to build and create a wrestler.

=== Super Fire Pro Wrestling X Premium ===
Super Fire Pro Wrestling X Premium
- Developer: Human Entertainment
- Publisher: Human Entertainment
- Platform: Super Famicom
- Release: JP: March 29, 1996
- Genres: Fighting, wrestling
- Modes: Single-player, multiplayer

Super Fire Pro Wrestling X Premium was released in 1996 for the Super Famicom. It has an extensive Edit mode where up to 80 created wrestlers can be stored and used in the game. The game features likenesses of over 100 real-life professional wrestlers that were included with fake names to prevent copyright infringement. Fan translations of the game surfaced online with the advent of emulators such as Snes9x and ZSNES. These translations not only converted the Japanese text to English, but also replaced the names of each wrestling likeness to its real-life counterpart. Unlike the more frenzied pace and button-mashing of arcade-style wrestling games, Super Fire Pro Wrestling X Premium focused instead on skill and specific timing. Each wrestler possesses three different 'levels' of attacks, Weak, Medium, and Strong, and must realistically wear down the opponent to use their most powerful attacks without being reversed or countered.

=== Fire Pro Wrestling S: 6 Men Scramble ===
Fire Pro Wrestling S: 6 Men Scramble
- Developer: Human Entertainment
- Publisher: Human Entertainment
- Series: Fire Pro Wrestling
- Platform: Sega Saturn
- Release: JP: December 27, 1996
- Genres: Fighting, wrestling
- Modes: Single-player, multiplayer

Fire Pro Wrestling S: 6 Men Scramble was released in 1996 for the Sega Saturn. The game's story mode was called "Victory Road", which enabled "Title Match" when completed. The matches in Fire Pro Wrestling S: 6 Men Scramble include One Night Match, Open League, One Night Tournament, Elimination Match, Battle Royal, the debut of Death Match and the return of Gruesome Fighting that had not been seen since Super Fire Pro Wrestling Special. The game also includes a deep wrestler edit mode. As its name suggests, Fire Pro Wrestling S: 6 Men Scramble was the first game in the Fire Pro series to feature six wrestlers at the same time.

=== Fire Pro Wrestling G ===
Fire Pro Wrestling G
- Developer: Human Entertainment
- Publisher: Human Entertainment
- Series: Fire Pro Wrestling
- Platform: PlayStation
- Release: JP: June 24, 1999
- Genres: Fighting, wrestling
- Modes: Single-player, multiplayer

=== Fire Pro Wrestling for WonderSwan ===
Fire Pro Wrestling for WonderSwan
- Developer: Human Entertainment
- Publisher: Human Entertainment
- Series: Fire Pro Wrestling
- Platform: WonderSwan
- Release: JP: August 31, 2000
- Genres: Fighting, wrestling
- Mode: Single-player

== Spike Games ==
=== Fire Pro Wrestling D ===
Fire Pro Wrestling D
- Developer: Spike
- Publisher: Spike
- Series: Fire Pro Wrestling
- Platform: Dreamcast
- Release: JP: March 1, 2001
- Genres: Fighting, wrestling

=== Fire Pro Wrestling ===
Fire Pro Wrestling
- Developer: Spike
- Publishers: JP: Spike; NA/EU: BAM! Entertainment
- Platform: Game Boy Advance
- Release: JP: March 21, 2001; NA: June 11, 2001; EU: June 22, 2001
- Genres: Fighting, wrestling
- Mode: Single-player

Fire Pro Wrestling (released in Japan as Fire Pro Wrestling A (ファイヤープロレスリング A, Faiyā Puro Resuringu A)) was the first Fire Pro game to receive an official English translation and the first to be released on a portable system rather than a console. A direct sequel, Fire Pro Wrestling 2, was released in 2002. The games use the A and B buttons for striking and grappling. True to many Fire Pro games, MMA is featured in the game and federations like Pride and The Ultimate Fighting Championship feature with fighters. The Octagon also made an appearance in this game, but was removed in the second for copyright issues.

=== Fire Pro Wrestling 2 ===
Fire Pro Wrestling 2
- Developer: Spike
- Publishers: JP: Spike; NA: BAM! Entertainment
- Platform: Game Boy Advance
- Release: JP: July 19, 2002; NA: September 23, 2002
- Genres: Fighting, wrestling
- Mode: Single-player

Fire Pro Wrestling 2 (released in Japan as Final Fire Pro Wrestling: Yume no Dantai Unei! (ファイナルファイヤープロレスリング ~夢の団体運営!~, Fainaru Faiyā Puro Resuringu ~Yume no Dantai Unei!~; lit. "Final Fire Pro Wrestling: Dream Organization Administration!")) is a direct sequel to 2001's Fire Pro Wrestling. Fire Pro Wrestling 2 is not actually the second game in the series; it is merely the second game to be officially translated into English.

==== Reception ====
Reception

Aggregate score
Aggregator	Score
Metacritic	72/100

Review scores
Publication	Score
Famitsu	30/40
Game Informer	9/10
GameSpot	8.3/10
GameZone	8.1/10
IGN	7/10
Nintendo Power	2.9/5

The game received "average" reviews according to Metacritic. In Japan, Famitsu gave it a score of 30 out of 40.

GameSpot named it the second-best Game Boy Advance game of September 2002. The game was a runner-up for the "Best Sports Game on Game Boy Advance" award at GameSpot's Best and Worst of 2002 Awards, which went to Tony Hawk's Pro Skater 3.

=== Fire Pro Wrestling Z ===
Fire Pro Wrestling Z
- Developer: Spike
- Publisher: Spike
- Series: Fire Pro Wrestling
- Platform: PlayStation 2
- Release: JP: June 5, 2003
- Genres: Fighting, wrestling

=== Fire Pro Wrestling Returns ===
Fire Pro Wrestling Returns
- Developer: Spike
- Publishers: JP: Spike; NA: Agetec; EU: 505 Games
- Series: Fire Pro Wrestling
- Platforms: PlayStation 2, PlayStation Network
- Release: PlayStation 2: JP: September 15, 2005; NA: November 13, 2007; EU: February 8, 2008; PlayStation Network: NA: April 23, 2013
- Genres: Fighting, wrestling
- Modes: Single-player, multiplayer

=== Fire Pro Wrestling in Mobage ===
Fire Pro Wrestling in Mobage
- Developer: Spike
- Publisher: Spike
- Series: Fire Pro Wrestling
- Platform: Mobage
- Release: JP: November 12, 2011
- Genres: Fighting, wrestling
- Mode: Single-player

=== Fire Pro Wrestling (Xbox 360) ===
Fire Pro Wrestling
- Developer: Spike Chunsoft
- Publisher: Microsoft Studios
- Series: Fire Pro Wrestling
- Platform: Xbox 360
- Release: WW: September 21, 2012
- Genres: Fighting, wrestling

This is the wrestling game for the Xbox 360 with the use of the Avatars. It involves campaign of wrestlers that Trainer Ted has trained, local exhibition, and online multiplayer.

== Fire Pro Wrestling World (PC 2017 / PS4 2018) ==
Fire Pro Wrestling World
- Developers: ZEX Corporation; Spike Chunsoft
- Publisher: Spike Chunsoft
- Directors: Tomoyuki Matsumoto; Toshiaki Tamura
- Producers: Takashi Kobayashi; Yasu Iizuka
- Designers: Toshiaki Tamura; Takeshi Soejima
- Artist: Kazuhito Kimura
- Series: Fire Pro Wrestling
- Platforms: Microsoft Windows; PlayStation 4
- Release: Microsoft Windows: WW: December 18, 2017; PlayStation 4: JP: August 8, 2018; US: August 28, 2018; EU: September 28, 2018
- Genres: Fighting, wrestling
- Modes: Single-player, multiplayer

== See also ==
- List of licensed wrestling video games
- List of fighting games
