= F1 Pole Position 64 =

1997 video game

- European edition box art
- Developer: Human Entertainment
- Publishers: JP: Human Entertainment; WW: Ubi Soft
- Platform: Nintendo 64
- Release: JP: March 28, 1997; EU: October 1, 1997; NA: October 15, 1997
- Genre: Racing
- Mode: Single-player

F1 Pole Position 64, released in Japan as Human Grand Prix: The New Generation (ヒューマングランプリ ザ・ニュージェネレーション, Hyūman Guran Puri Za Nyū Jenerēshon), is a racing video game for the Nintendo 64 developed by Human Entertainment and published by Human Entertainment in Japan, and published by Ubi Soft for North American and Europe. It is the fifth and final game in the Human Grand Prix / F1 Pole Position series (with the F1 Pole Position branding skipping over the previous III and IV editions), featuring Formula One branding.

F1 Pole Position 64 is based on the 1996 Formula One season, although the Japanese version did not have licenses from the FIA or the FOCA.

== Gameplay ==
Screenshot featuring the Monaco street circuit, driven in a Ferrari F310

The game features all the tracks from the 1996 season, at a time when the racing began in Australia, and ended in Japan. Teams are set up with relevant drivers (with Jacques Villeneuve being replaced with a generic driver named "Driver-X" due to Villeneuve not licensing his likeness), however there is a roster-feature included, which allows the player to reassign drivers to different teams (including assigning the same driver to more than one role), and even removing a real driver and replacing him with unknown drivers named "Driver <1~8>" (Driver 2's image, date of birth and nationality all match that of Ralf Schumacher, who did not begin his F1 career until 1997; in the Japanese version, the drivers are loosely named after Formula One drivers not racing in 1996). If the player finishes overall first in the World Grand Prix mode, they can change engines between teams as well. Both driver and engine swapping will significantly affect the performance of the car.

The car can be controlled with either the analog stick or D-pad on the standard Nintendo 64 controller. Weather is variable, and inclement weather can occur in the middle of a race. On the bottom left corner of the screen are different indicators for car conditions: a fuel gauge and five indicators, one for each part of the car (in order: wings, tires, suspension, brakes and gearbox), all of which change color according to the car's condition, from blue to yellow to red to flashing red. When an indicator reaches flashing red, the player risks retiring from the race if it isn't fixed in time.

The main Grand Prix Mode allows players to progress through the racing calendar, with each race being ten laps; there are also battle mode (single race format) and time trial modes. Battle mode allows the player to choose what drivers to race against as well as standard options like laps and weather options. The game features internal vehicle damage (see bottom left of screen shot) but no external, apart from smoke that would appear if a driver blew their engine. The game only allows players to drive by default a maximum of 10 laps on every track, however by holding down a button when one is selecting how many laps to do, the player can exceed that limit and race up to 30 laps.

== Development ==
The game was showcased at E3 1997.

== Reception ==
Reception

Aggregate score
Aggregator	Score
GameRankings	58%

Review scores
Publication	Score
AllGame	1.5/5
Edge	5/10
Electronic Gaming Monthly	6/10; 7/10
Famitsu	24/40
Game Informer	7/10
GameFan	89/100; 89/100; 84/100
GamePro	3/5; 3.5/5; 3.5/5; 2.5/5
GameSpot	4.2/10
Hyper	67%
IGN	4.1/10
N64 Magazine	71%
Next Generation	3/5; 2/5
Nintendo Power	7.1/10
64 Extreme	60%

F-1 Pole Position 64 received mixed reviews from critics. In Japan, Famitsu gave it a score of 24 out of 40. Positive reviewers from GameFan and Next Generation recommended it to F-1 fans, the latter suggesting it may even appeal to fans of racing games in general. In a more lukewarm review, Kraig Kujawa of Electronic Gaming Monthly suggested no one besides racing simulation fans try it out. Next Generation said of the Japanese version, "This a game for the starving, desperate Nintendo fan who simply has to have an F1 racing game, quality be damned. If you're not desperate, forget it." However, they found that considerably more work went into the U.S. version, with less pop-up and overall smoother graphics. They reviewed that "All in all, the game will satisfy F1 enthusiasts and may even nab general racing fans as well. With all of its modification choices, tons of courses, modes of play, and real-life racers and courses, F1 is a game worth a look."

However, most reviewers commented that even with the improvements made for the U.S. release, the amount of pop-up is unacceptable, the controls are poor, the music is dull and generic, and the engine sounds are high-pitched and completely unrealistic. IGN and GamePro also criticized the lack of any multiplayer, though IGN and Next Generation noted that players can still compete with each other by using the Controller Pak to transfer their records. The most widespread compliment for the game was that the courses are challenging to master.

IGN criticised that "the tracks look almost nothing like their real-life counterparts." Glenn Rubenstein, writing for GameSpot, concluded that "it looks good, but that's the only thing it has going for it." In Electronic Gaming Monthly Kraig Kujawa wrote: "For racing simulation fans, F-1 might be worthwhile, but otherwise, don't bother."

== See also ==
- F1 Racing Simulation, a game for the PC by Ubisoft, also based on the 1996 Formula One season
