= Nakajima Satoru F-1 Hero =

1988 video game

- Developer: Human Entertainment
- Publishers: Varie; American Sammy
- Platform: NES
- Release: JP: December 9, 1988; NA: June 1990
- Genre: Racing
- Modes: Single-player, multiplayer

Nakajima Satoru F-1 Hero (known in North America as Michael Andretti's World GP) is a video game developed by Human Entertainment released for the Nintendo Entertainment System in 1990. It starred Japanese Formula One driver Satoru Nakajima, and featured the full sixteen-race schedule of the FIA Formula One World Championship circuit.

In the North American version, Satoru Nakajima was replaced by CART driver Michael Andretti, though Andretti himself would only compete in Formula One in the 1993 season).

F-1 Hero was unique in that it deviated from most console racing games of its time. Instead of being an arcade-style driving game (such as Rad Racer or Al Unser Jr.'s Turbo Racing), F-1 Hero more closely resembled a simulation-style racing game. It was the first NES racing game to feature an entire field of real-life drivers (although all but Andretti had pseudonyms), and rather accurately depicted the sixteen circuits on the Formula One schedule. Four different cars were offered in the game, but there were no car set-ups in the game, a feature most frequently associated with racing simulations.

== Gameplay ==
Compared to most console racing games of its time, F-1 Hero was much more difficult. The circuits were accurately depicted as having both sharp and wide turns, thus requiring players to slow down to certain speeds for corners, instead of most arcade-style games, which allowed players to unrealistically take turns flat-out. Gear shifting was also required for three of the cars (and notably for 8 of the 9 levels of the game), and some courses required dozens of gear changes per lap. Tire wear increased as the races went on, and players would be required to pit for tires at least once during each race to remain competitive.

When multiple cars were on the track, the game featured no direct interaction between vehicles. All of the competitors' machines behaved in a ghost-like manner, and could be driven through and occupy the same space as others. Cars were unable to spin others out, and could not directly impede their progress.

Nearly every screen in the entire game featured a short-looped, repeating soundtrack. Unlike most racing games, however, there was no music played while actually driving.

F-1 Hero featured a 16-race Formula One schedule resembling that of 1988. Each circuit featured a pit area represented by a pylon. On most circuits, the pits were located just prior to the start/finish line. In France, England, Spain, and Australia, the pits were located just after the start/finish line.

Four different machines were featured in the game. Each had a unique pitch, and slightly varying top speeds. The Chevy was the dominant machine in the game, despite not being a Formula One car. In reality, it was used in the CART series. Andretti, in fact, drove one in the CART series from 1989–1991, and the cover art on the game box accurately displays Andretti's 1989 Lola Chevrolet.

== Grand Prix mode ==
The Grand Prix mode of F-1 Hero featured nine levels of competition. Each had an increasing number of rounds, an increased level of difficulty, and was led by a featured driver. For each level, the player was provided a certain car. Players could save and continue games by use of a password.

=== Qualifying ===
Upon entering the Grand Prix mode, the player registers a name and begins at level 1. At the onset of each race, the player is first shown a map of the circuit. On the next screen, the player is shown the results of qualifying thus far. All five computer opponents have completed their time trial run. The top four comprise the tentative starting grid. The slowest computer driver (fifth fastest) does not qualify. The objective of qualifying is for the player to qualify amongst the top four, and "bump" into the starting grid.

Qualifying consists of five timed laps alone on the track. From a standing start, the player has five laps to record the best single lap time possible. Tire wear influences the speeds, and pitting for tires is allowed on any lap. However, elapsed seconds in the pit area are included in the respective lap time. The fastest single lap is recorded and if it is among the four fastest qualifiers, the player qualifies for the race. If the player does not qualify, they must sit out the race, and instead watch it through the perspective of the featured driver. Hitting the "select" button during qualifying aborts the session. If the player had already registered a lap fast enough to qualify for the race, it is unnecessary to run all five laps.

=== Race ===
The race begins from a standing start and runs a specific number of laps, depending upon the length of the circuit. The top half of the screen features a map of the circuit, and the position of all four cars represented by icons. Tire wear influences lap times, and a pit stop for tires near the halfway point is required to remain competitive. Players are required to compete, and are not allowed to abort the race. If a car is lapped during the race, the player will only be scored for laps completed. Spinning out during the race is possible, but no incident ever causes a car to completely drop out of the race. Fuel is also not a factor in the game.

=== Championship points ===
At the conclusion of each race, points are awarded to the four finishers (5-3-2-1). At the end of the level, a champion is declared. In order to advance to the next level, the player is required to score the most points and be the champion of the level. If the player does not score the most points in the level, the player may use the password to return to the first race of the level and try again. For scoring the most points in Level 9, the player is declared the World Champion, wins the game overall, and a special screen is displayed. If the player did not win the championship, the game is over.

== Michael Andretti's World GP ==
This game was the English-language version of Nakajima Satoru F-1 Hero. It was an original Formula One videogame released in 1988 and was popular in Japan during that decade. Andretti and Nintendo released this game two years later for a North American audience.

== Practice mode ==
In the practice mode, players could choose any of the sixteen circuits, and any of the four cars. The bottom half of the screen featured the driving apparatus. The top half of the screen featured a map of the circuit with the player's car represented by an icon as it went around.

Upon selecting the course, Michael Andretti would come on the screen and give background and advice about driving the circuit. Practice sessions were five laps each, with elapsed times recorded and reported for each of the five laps upon conclusion. Hitting the "select" button aborted the session.

== Two-player mode ==
In two-player mode, players drove in a head-to-head race against another human opponent, or any of the games' computer opponents. Two computer opponents could also be chosen to race against one another. Any of the sixteen courses could be chosen by the players, and any of the four cars could be chosen by the players. Race distance was chosen by the competitors, ranging from one to ten laps.

The top half of the screen was the driving apparatus of player 1, and the bottom half of the screen was the driving apparatus for player 2. Instead of a map of the circuit, a graph in the middle of the screen depicted the lap length and the relative distance between the two opponents.

== Reception ==
Reception

Review score
Publication	Score
VideoGames & Computer Entertainment	4/10
