= Nakajima Satoru Kanshū F1 Super License =

1992 video game

- Box art
- Developers: Aprinet (programming); Varie
- Publisher: Varie
- Composer: Yusuke Takahama
- Series: Satoru Nakajima Formula One
- Platform: Sega Mega Drive
- Release: JP: December 11, 1992
- Genre: Racing
- Mode: Single-player

Nakajima Satoru Kanshū F1 Super License (中嶋悟監修 Ｆ１ スーパーライセンス) is a 1992 racing video game for the Sega Mega Drive that allows for either single season or exhibition modes of play. The object of the game is to acquire the championship for the 1992 Formula One season. There is an official FOCA license and uses a top-down view.

== Gameplay ==
=== General gameplay ===
Players can choose from more than a dozen teams and more than twenty drivers as the overhead perspective of the game challenges even the most skilled driver. Every race has five laps for qualifying, practice, and the actual race itself. It is not possible for races to go for either less or more than five laps. Free runs can also be done; the same five-lap maximum applies to free runs in addition to the races. Satoru Nakajima endorsed the game but he does not appear in it as he had just retired from the sport. Unlike most Formula One video games, the player must qualify for a race in order to compete (this applies just to the GP game mode. The "SPOT" mode doesn't have qualifications). Failing to meet a target time means not being able to race (and ending up with an automatic score of zero points for that particular race). Players have the ability to race a 16-race season, provided they can qualify and score enough points, thus avoiding getting dropped by the team. At the end of the season, Satoru Nakajima appears to assess the player's driving skills.

=== F1 Season constructors ===
The game included all the teams that competed in the 1992 Formula One season. The changes in driver lineups weren't reflected, so the game featured the drivers who entered the most races.

Different cars had different handling and top-speed, reflecting the level of competitiveness showed in the 1992 World Championship, but choosing the 6-gears manual transmission boosted the top-speed of the car to 400 km/h while using the 'overtake button'.

=== Scoring ===
The Formula One points system as of the 1991 season, as it was in effect at the time of the game's publishing, is used. Only the top six earn points per race (10-6-4-3-2-1).
