= Human Entertainment =

Japanese video game developer and publisher

Human Corporation
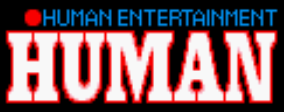
- Native name: ヒューマン株式会社
- Romanized name: Hyūman Kabushiki Gaisha
- Industry: Video games
- Founded: May 1983; 43 years ago
- Defunct: January 2000; 26 years ago
- Fate: Bankruptcy
- Headquarters: Japan
- Key people: Goichi Suda; Hifumi Kono
- Products: Clock Tower; Fire Pro Wrestling; Twilight Syndrome
- Website: human.co.jp

Human Corporation (Japanese: ヒューマン株式会社, Hepburn: Hyūman Kabushiki Gaisha), often doing business as Human Entertainment, was a Japanese video game developer and publisher founded in 1983. The company produced games for a number of platforms, including home consoles, portable consoles, and personal computers. Human declared bankruptcy in 2000 and disbanded. Its former employees went on to form new companies including Nude Maker, Sandlot, Spike, and Grasshopper Manufacture.

The company is known for originating the popular Fire Pro Wrestling series, as well as other sports games such as Formation Soccer and Final Match Tennis, and racing video games such as Human Grand Prix and Fastest 1. They are also known for developing the first music rhythm video game, Dance Aerobics (1987), the 3D open world game Mizzurna Falls (1998), and some early horror games including the Twilight Syndrome and Clock Tower series.

== History ==
Originally, Human was two different entities known as TRY Corporation and Communicate, Inc. until the two merged into one as Sonata. The company then changed its name into Human Corporation in 1989 and later started a division called Human Creative School, where their students would start out developing video games. One example of its efforts was for the Famicom game Egypt. In addition, the company also had an in-house sound team known as HELP.

On November 1, 1999, Human Corporation began to negotiate restructure with Tokyo Hachiōji district court over the approximately 4 billion yen outstanding debt. As part of the deal, the game creator school subsidiary was to be transferred. At the same time, the rights for the Fire Pro Wrestling series, Twilight Syndrome series, and Bakusou Dekotora series went to Spike Co., Ltd.

In January 2000, Human Corporation declared bankruptcy for failing to negotiate for a restructuring deal over the 3.79 billion yen (as of November 1999) outstanding debt.

Former Human members went on to form different development teams including Nude Maker, Sandlot, and Spike, and notable member Goichi Suda formed his own company, Grasshopper Manufacture, with former members.

== Games ==
=== Developed by Human Entertainment ===
==== Arcade ====
- Front Row (unreleased)
- Mad Dancing (unreleased)
- Grand Striker - Human Cup (released 1993)
- Blazing Tornado (released 1994)
- Grand Striker 2 (released 1996)

==== Famicom Disk System ====
- The Mysterious Murasame Castle (released 1986)
- Pro Wrestling

==== Game Boy ====
- HAL Wrestling (released 1990)
- SD Gundam Gaiden: Lacroan Heroes (released on October 6, 1990)

==== Nintendo Entertainment System ====
- Adventures of Gilligan's Island
- Athletic World
- Baseball Stars
- Dance Aerobics
- Egypt
- Exciting Boxing
- Exciting Rally: World Rally Championship
- Gyrodine
- Kabuki: Quantum Fighter
- Kamen Rider Black
- Karakuri Kengoden Musashi Lord: Karakuri Jin Hashiru!
- Mechanized Attack
- Meimon! Daisan Yakyū-bu
- Monster Party
- Motocross Champion
- Musashi no Ken - Tadaima Shugyō Chū
- Pro Wrestling
- P.O.W.: Prisoners of War
- Venus Wars
- Stadium Events
- SD Gundam World Gachapon Senshi 2 - Capsule Senki
- Super Team Games
- Top Rider

==== Nintendo 64 ====
- Air Boarder 64 (released March 27, 1998)
- F1 Pole Position 64 (released October 15, 1997)

==== PC Engine ====
- F1 Triple Battle (released 1989)
- Fire Pro Wrestling Combination Tag (released June 22, 1989)
- Fire Pro Wrestling 2nd Bout (released August 30, 1991)
- Fire Pro Wrestling 3: Legend Bout (released 1992)
- Fire Pro Women-ALL WOMEN VS JWP (released 1995)
- Final Match Tennis (released 1991)
- Formation Soccer-Human Cup 90 (released 1990)
- FORMATION SOCCER ON J LEAGUE (released 1994)
- FORMATION SOCCER '95 DELLA SERIE A (released 1995)
- Human Sports Festival (released 1992)
- NEO METAL FANTASY (released 1992)
- Space Battleship Yamato “Cinemalize Simulation Game” (released December 1992)
- Vasteel (released 1990)
- Vasteel 2 (released 1994)

==== PC (Windows) ====
- Clock Tower ~The First Fear~ (released March 28, 1997)
- The Conveni (released April 26, 1996)
- The Conveni III (released April 19, 2002)
- The Conveni Pack: Ano Machi wo Dokusen Seyo + Power Up Kit (released April 24, 2003)
- The Marugoto (released December 7, 2001)

==== PlayStation ====
- Bakuso Dekotora Densetsu: Art Truck Battle (released June 24, 1998)
- Clock Tower ~The First Fear~ (released July 17, 1997)
- Clock Tower (released December 13, 1996 as Clock Tower 2)
- Clock Tower II: The Struggle Within (released March 12, 1998 as Clock Tower: Ghost Head)
- The Conveni (released March 28, 1997)
- The Conveni 2 (released December 18, 1997)
- The Drug Store (released August 6, 1998)
- Fire Pro Wrestling G (released 2000)
- Formation Soccer '97: The Road to France (released June 27, 1997)
- Formation Soccer '98: Ganbare Nippon in France (released June 4, 1998)
- Hyper Final Match Tennis (released March 22, 1996)
- Hyper Formation Soccer (released October 13, 1995)
- Mikagura Shōjo Tanteidan (released September 17, 1998)
- Mizzurna Falls (released December 23, 1998)
- Moonlight Syndrome (released October 9, 1997)
- Neko Zamurai (released March 4, 1999)
- Remote Control Dandy (released July 22, 1999)
- Twilight Syndrome: Search (released March 1, 1996)
- Twilight Syndrome: Investigation (released July 19, 1996)
- The Firemen 2: Pete & Danny (released December 22, 1995)
- Vanguard Bandits (released July 30, 1998)
- Zoku Mikagura Shōjo Tanteidan ~Kanketsuhen~ (released October 7, 1999)

==== Sega Saturn ====
- The Conveni (released March 20, 1997)
- The Conveni 2 (released March 12, 1998)
- Fire Pro Wrestling S: 6 Men Scramble (released December 27, 1996)

==== Sega CD ====
- Bari-Arm (Android Assault)

==== Sega Mega Drive (Genesis) ====
- Fastest 1
- Thunder Pro Wrestling Retsuden
- Ultraman (released 1993)

==== Super NES (Super Famicom) ====
- Clock Tower (released September 14, 1995)
- Dragon's Earth (released December 30, 1992)
- Dream Basketball: Dunk & Hoop
- F1 Pole Position
- F1 Pole Position 2
- Human Grand Prix III: F1 Triple Battle
- Human Grand Prix IV: F1 Dream Battle
- SOS (also known as Septentrion) (released June 1, 1994)
- Super Final Match Tennis (released August 12, 1994)
- Super Fire Pro Wrestling X (released December 22, 1995)
- Super Fire Pro Wrestling X Premium (released March 29, 1996)
- Super Fire Pro Wrestling: Queen's Special
- Super Soccer
- Super Formation Soccer II
- Super Formation Soccer 94
- Super Formation Soccer 95: della Serie A
- Super Formation Soccer 96: World Club Edition
- Taekwon-Do (released June 28, 1994)
- The Firemen (released September 9, 1994)
- Waku Waku Ski Wonder Spur

==== TurboGrafx-16/Duo/PC Engine ====
- Far The Earth no Jakoutei: Neo Metal Fantasy (released 1992)
- Final Match Tennis (released March 17, 1991)
- Formation Soccer: Human Cup '90 (released April 27, 1990)
- Formation Soccer on J-League (released January 15, 1994)
- Formation Soccer 95: della Serie A (released April 7, 1995)
- Vasteel (released 1992)

==== WonderSwan ====
- Clock Tower (released December 9, 1999)

=== Published by Human Entertainment ===
==== Arcade ====
- Mad Dancing (released 1992)
- Grand Striker - Human Cup (released 1993)
- Blazing Tornado (released 1994)
- Grand Striker 2 (released 1996)

==== Dreamcast ====
- Fire Pro Wrestling D (released March 6, 2001)

==== Game Boy ====
- Chacha-Maru Boukenki 3: Abyss no Tou (released August 2, 1991)
- Chacha-Maru Panic (released April 19, 1991)
- HAL Wrestling (released 1990)

==== Nintendo 64 ====
- Air Boarder 64 (released March 27, 1998)
- Human Grand Prix: The New Generation

==== TurboGrafx-16/Duo/PC Engine ====
- Fire Pro Wrestling Combination Tag (released June 22, 1989)
- Final Match Tennis (released March 17, 1991)
- Fire Pro Wrestling 2nd Bout (released August 30, 1991)
- Vasteel (released 1992)
- Far The Earth no Jakoutei: Neo Metal Fantasy (released 1992)
- Laplace no Ma (March 30, 1993)
- Vasteel 2 (released 1994)

==== PC (Windows) ====
- Clock Tower ~The First Fear~ (released March 28, 1997)
- The Marugoto (released December 7, 2001)

==== PlayStation ====
- Bakusou Dekotora Densetsu: Art Truck Battle (released June 24, 1998)
- Blue Breaker: Ken yori mo Hohoemi o (released 1997)
- Clock Tower ~The First Fear~ (released July 17, 1997)
- Clock Tower (released December 13, 1996 as Clock Tower 2)
- Clock Tower II: The Struggle Within (released March 12, 1998 as Clock Tower: Ghost Head)
- Fire Pro Wrestling G (released 2000)
- Formation Soccer '97: The Road to France
- Hyper Final Match Tennis (released March 22, 1996)
- Mikagura Shōjo Tanteidan (released September 17, 1998)
- Mizzurna Falls (released December 23, 1998)
- Moonlight Syndrome (released October 9, 1997)
- Neko Zamurai (released March 4, 1999)
- Remote Control Dandy (released July 22, 1999)
- Septentrion: Out of the Blue (released March 11, 1999)
- Sound Qube (released March 12, 1998)
- The Conveni: Ano Machi wo Dokusen Seyo (released March 28, 1997)
- The Conveni 2: Zenkoku Chain Tenkai da! (released December 18, 1997)
- The Conveni Special (released March 12, 1998)
- The Drug Store: Matsumoto Kiyoshi de Okaimono! (released August 6, 1998)
- Twilight Syndrome: Search (released March 1, 1996)
- Twilight Syndrome: Investigation (released July 19, 1996)
- Vanguard Bandits (released July 30, 1998)
- Zoku Mikagura Shōjo Tanteidan ~Kanketsuhen~ (released October 7, 1999)

==== Saturn ====
- 2TaxGold (released January 17, 1997)
- Fire Pro Gaiden: Blazing Tornado (released 1995)
- Fire Pro Wrestling S: 6 Men Scramble (released December 27, 1996)
- Sound Qube (released April 2, 1998)
- The Conveni: Ano Machi wo Dokusen Seyo (released February 20, 1997)
- The Conveni 2: Zenkoku Chain Tenkai da! (released March 12, 1998)

==== Super NES ====
- Clock Tower (released September 14, 1995)
- Dragon's Earth (released December 30, 1992)
- Dream Basketball: Dunk & Hoop
- F1 Pole Position
- Human Baseball
- Super Fire Pro Wrestling 3 Final Bout
- The Firemen (released September 9, 1994)
- Laplace no Ma (released 1993)
- Super Final Match Tennis (released August 12, 1994)
- Super Fire Pro Wrestling X (released December 22, 1995)
- Super Fire Pro Wrestling X Premium (released March 29, 1996)
- SOS (released May 28, 1993)
- Tadaima Yuusha Boshuuchuu Okawari (released November 25, 1994)
- Taekwon-Do (released June 28, 1994)

==== WonderSwan ====
- Bakusou Dekotora Densetsu (released December 22, 1999)
- Clock Tower (released December 9, 1999)

== In popular media ==
In the 1993 tokusatsu series Denkou Choujin Gridman, episode 9 "The Fiendish Brainwashing Strategy," the building, classrooms and offices of Human Creative School are used as set for this episode.
