= F1 Pole Position (video game) =

1992 video game

- North American cover art
- Developer: Human Entertainment
- Publishers: JP: Human Entertainment; NA/EU: Ubi Soft
- Composer: Team Help
- Series: Human Grand Prix
- Platform: Super Nintendo Entertainment System
- Release: JP: 20 November 1992; EU/NA: December 1993
- Genre: Racing
- Modes: Single-player, multiplayer

F1 Pole Position (Note: Known in Japan as Human Grand Prix (Japanese: ヒューマングランプリ).) is a 1992 racing video game for the SNES, developed by Human Entertainment and published by them in Japan, while the other versions were handled by Ubi Soft. It is the first game in the Human Grand Prix/F1 Pole Position series, which features Formula One licensing.

== Gameplay ==
The sixteen actual race courses from the 1992 Formula One season are used in the game. The opposition cars can pass through one another without crashing. There is also a bug for the Canadian Grand Prix where at the hairpin, the barriers have a gap enabling one to drive through and onto the grass.

Vehicles can be customized to adapt to the different race tracks. Everything can be changed, including the steering, gears, brakes, and suspension. There is an option for pit work to be manual or automatic, along with the option for automatic/manual gear shifting.

== Related Game Boy game ==
In 1993, Ubisoft used the "F1 Pole Position" name for a localization of the Game Boy title Nakajima Satoru F-1 Hero GB '92: The Graded Driver, a sequel to Satoru Nakajima F-1 Hero GB World Championship '91. Although the games were made by Varie instead and are part of the separate F-1 Hero series, Human developed the first two for the Super Famicom.

== Development and release ==
The game was developed and published by Human Entertainment with co-operation with Fuji Television and FOCA. Michael Andretti was used in the game instead of Ayrton Senna because his contract was secured with Sega for their Super Monaco GP II video game (in the Japanese release of the game the no. 1 McLaren features Ayrton Senna); Senna's helmet is clearly visible in the no. 1 McLaren in the North American release.

In the European version of the game tobacco sponsorship is missing from the cars. These sponsors appear on the Japanese version.

The game was released on November 20, 1992 in Japan. The Japanese release is single-player only. A multiplayer mode was added when the game was localized to North America.

== Sequels ==
- F1 Pole Position 2
- Human Grand Prix III: F1 Triple Battle
- Human Grand Prix IV: F1 Dream Battle
- F1 Pole Position 64
