= Store manager =

Person responsible for the day-to-day operations of a retail store

Store manager, Retail manager
Occupation
- Names: Store manager
- Activity sectors: Commerce, Business

Description
- Competencies: Operations Management; Team building Human Resources Management; Financial Management; Sales Management; Events Management; Marketing; Revenue Management; Customer Relationship Management
- Fields of employment: Retail

A retail manager (or store manager) is the person ultimately responsible for the day-to-day operations (or management) of a retail store. All employees working in the store report to the retail/store manager. A store manager reports to a district/area or general manager.

== Roles and responsibilities ==
Responsibilities of a store manager include:

- Staff management: managing staff rotas; hiring, training, and firing of staff members; mediating disputes between staff; and taking overall care of staff and their well-being
- Presentation of store and advertising displays, managing sales promotions as well as organising in-store promotional events
- Product management, including ordering, receiving, price changes, handling damaged products, and returns
- Handling customer complaints and queries
- Utilising retail software in stores management and materials control

Responsibilities may differ if a manager runs an independent store or works for a chain store. For example, a store manager of a chain may be asked to implement marketing strategies from internal marketing teams.

== Sales generation ==
A store manager must meet the monthly, quarterly, or annual sales goals, depending on the company's fiscal cycle. This involves setting individual sales goals (quotas), holding contests for employees, or offering sales promotions. The manager may also find ways to make employees more productive to meet the goals. Thus, the store manager may be forced to reduce payroll expenditures by decreasing employees' hours, or otherwise reducing operating cost. A store manager should motivate their team to achieve the target set for the store. A store manager should set an example for their subordinates to follow.

== Safety and security ==
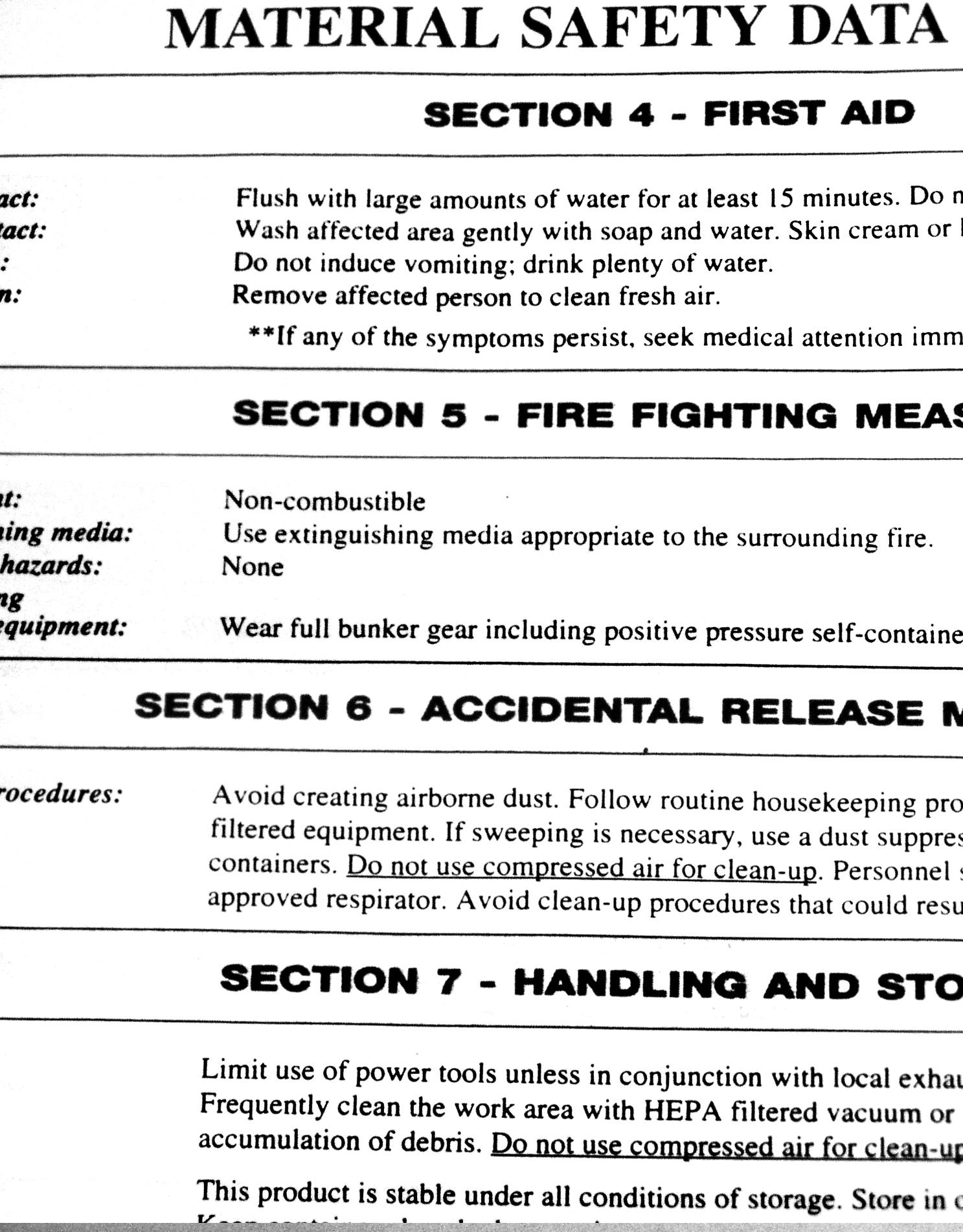
The general manager must post material safety data sheets for their employees for any hazardous materials used in the store.

The Store manager is the store's primary key-holder and may be called to the store before, during, or after business hours in the event of an emergency. They are also responsible for the safety of all customers and employees on store premises. Store managers may be required to hold safety meetings, especially as dictated by union practices in cases where store employees belong to a union.

== Division of responsibility ==
A store manager may have several subordinates who have management-level responsibility. These employees may be called deputy managers, assistant managers, department managers, supervisors, key holders, shift leads, or leads. Sometimes members of the management team may be several grades below the store manager. One example would be store manager - deputy manager - department manager - department leads. A store manager has over-all responsibility for all day-to-day activity of the store. Managing & controlling staff, and planning are essential points of the store manager.

== Hiring, training and development ==
The store manager is responsible for hiring, training, and in some cases, development of employees. The manager must ensure staffing levels are adequate to effectively operate the store, and ensure employees receive training necessary for their job responsibilities. Managers may be responsible for developing employees so the company can promote employees from within and develop future leaders, potentially for employment at other locations. Store managers also have the fire powers to any under-performing or misbehaving employees. The role of store managers with regard to the other employees varies from company to company and each respective company's operating methods but in general a store manager will be required to deal with and try to solve any and all problems that may occur at any given time

== See also ==
- Karen (slang)
- List of management topics
- List of marketing topics
- Shopkeeper
- Warehouse
