= Guia Circuit =

Motorsport street circuit in Macau

- Grand Prix Circuit (1958–present)
- Location: Macau
- Coordinates: 22°11′50″N 113°33′3″E
- Capacity: 15,000 (Grandstands)
- FIA Grade: 2 (Restricted)
- Opened: 31 October 1954; 72 years ago
- Major events: Current: Macau Grand Prix (1958–present); Macau Guia Race (1963–present); Macau GT Cup (2008–present); Macau Motorcycle Grand Prix (1967–2019, 2022–present); Former: TCR China (2020, 2023); TCR Asia Series (2015–2016, 2021–2022); Porsche Carrera Cup Asia (2003–2007); WTCR (2018–2019); WTCC (2005–2014, 2017); TCR International Series (2015–2016); Asian Touring Car Series (2000–2005, 2009–2011)
- Website: https://www.macau.grandprix.gov.mo/

Grand Prix Circuit (1958–present)
- Length: 6.120 km (3.803 mi)
- Turns: 24
- Race lap record: 2:06.257 ( (United Kingdom) Luke Browning, Dallara F3 2019, 2023, F3)

Original Circuit (1954–1957)
- Length: 6.276 km (3.900 mi)
- Turns: 26

The Guia Circuit, or Circuito da Guia, is a 6.120 km (3.803 mi) street circuit located at the southeast region of the Macau Peninsula in Macau. It is the venue of the Macau Grand Prix, Macau Motorcycle Grand Prix and the Macau Guia Race. The circuit consists of long straights and tight corners, and features the characteristics of a typical street circuit - narrow, bumpy and limited overtaking opportunities. However, there are two special features that can rarely be found in other street circuits - variation in altitude (over 30 m (100 ft) between highest and lowest point of the circuit) and an ultra long main straight that allows a top speed of 260 km/h (160 mph) on Formula Three cars. As a result, the circuit is recognised as one of the most challenging circuits in the world in terms of both driving and tuning.

== History ==
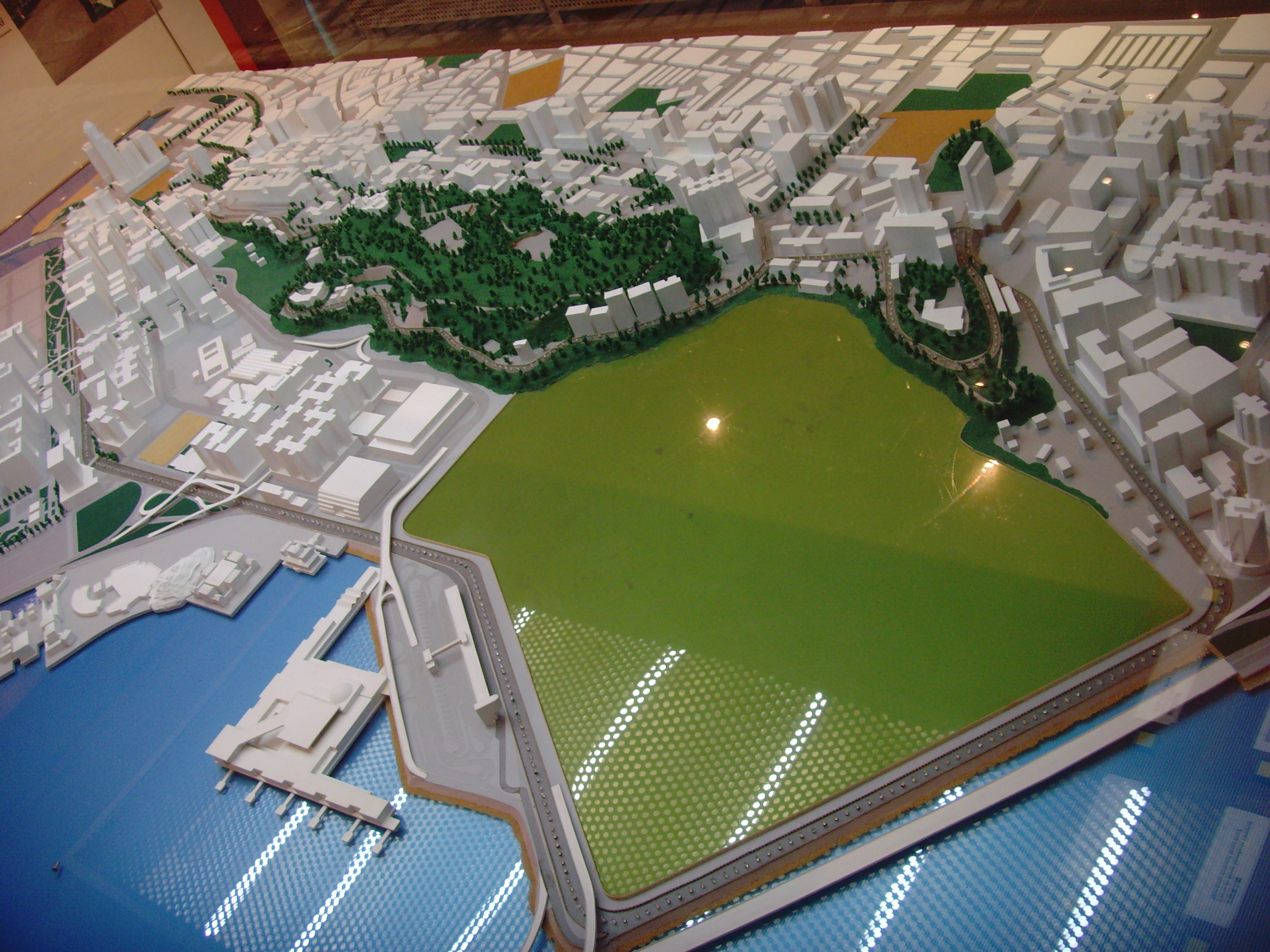
Architectural model of the Guia Circuit at the Grand Prix Museum

The Guia Circuit was originally conceived in 1954 as the route for a treasure hunt around the streets of the city, but shortly after the event it was suggested that the hunt's track could host an amateur racing event for local motor enthusiasts. Since 1967, with the introduction of a motorcycle race, the track has become a venue for both motorcycle and car racing events.

== Layout ==
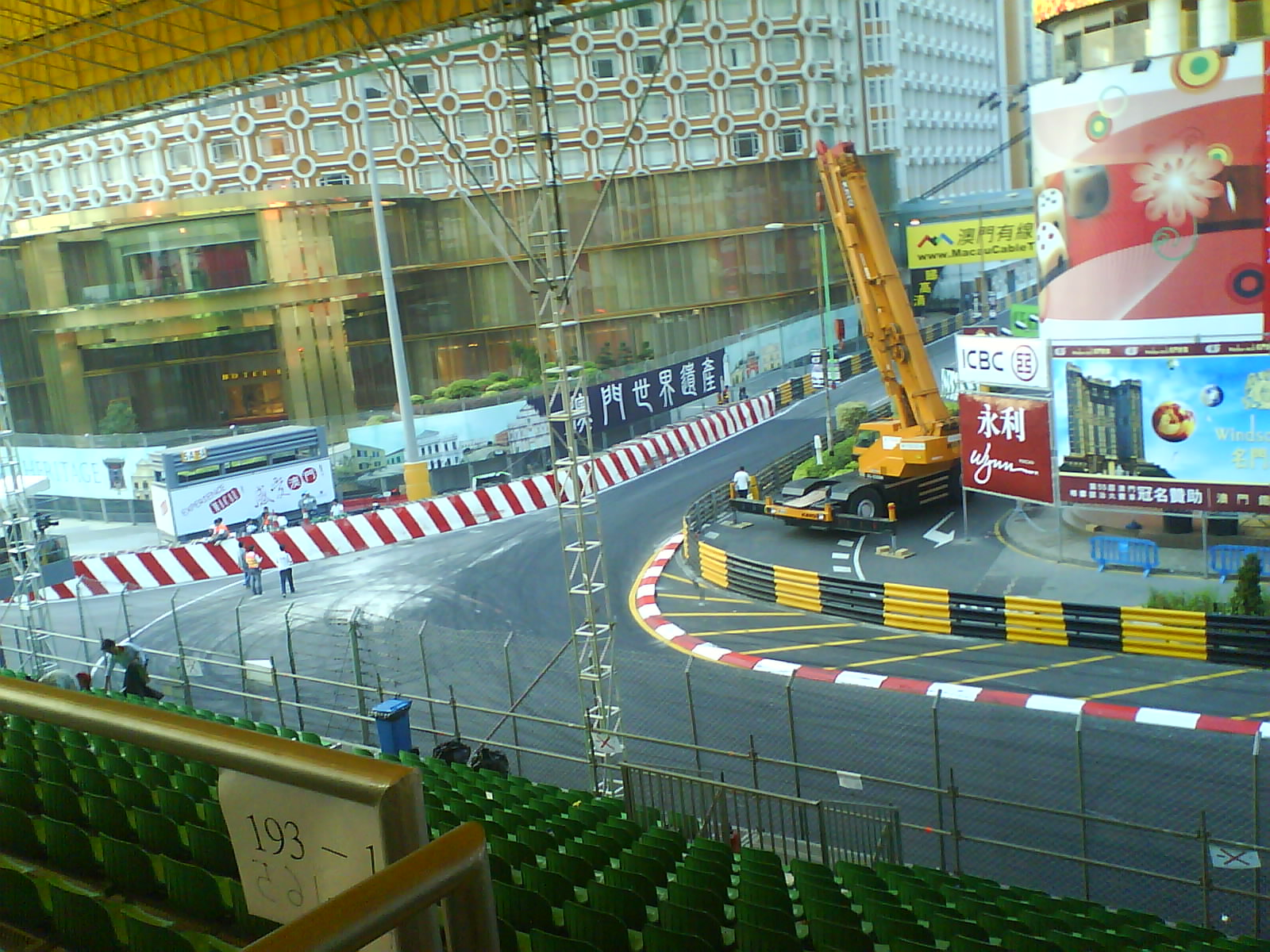
The Hotel Lisboa Curve

The circuit has not been modified since 1957 except when the pit and paddock complex was relocated in 1993. This work included the removal of a gravel trap which had been located near the Reservoir Bend. The narrowest part of the track is at the Melco Hairpin which has a width of merely 7 m (23 ft). The whole length of the circuit is bound by Armco barriers painted in black and yellow stripes.

== Grandstands ==
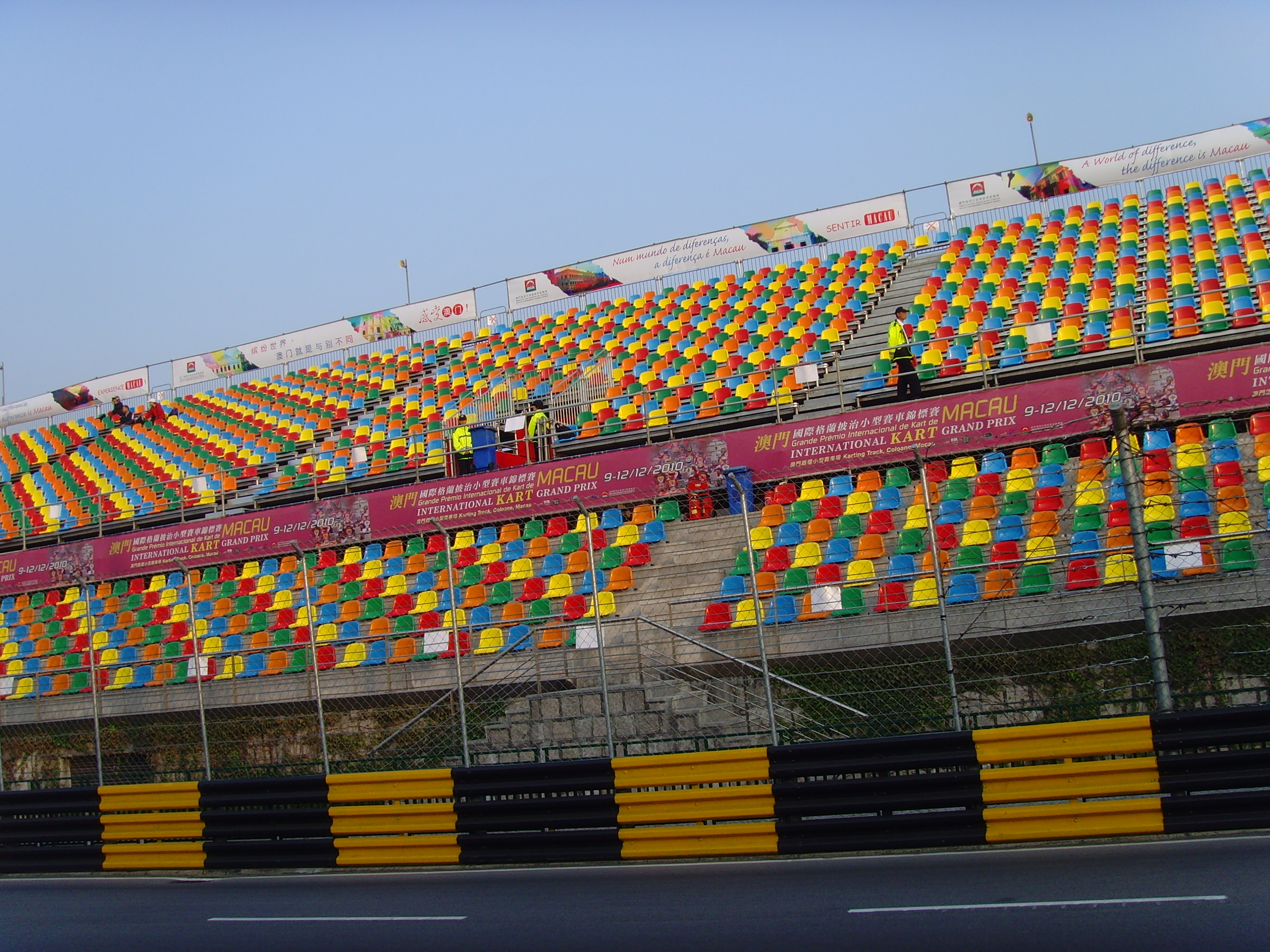
Grandstand at the Guia Circuit

There are two major grandstands around the circuit, along the pit straight and at the Lisboa Bend.

== Racing events ==
The circuit hosts the Macau Grand Prix, a unique event with its combination of motorcycle and car races within the same race weekend. The Macau Motorcycle GP race, the Guia Race (WTCC final rounds from 2005 to 2014) and the Macau Formula 3 GP are the highlights of the event. In addition, various kind of racing events are organised for competition between local and regional (Hong Kong, Taiwan, Japan, South East Asia, etc.) enthusiasts.

=== Current events ===
- November: FIA FR World Cup, FIA GT World Cup, FIA F4 World Cup, TCR World Tour Macau Guia Race, Macau Motorcycle Grand Prix, Greater Bay Area GT Cup (GT4), Macau Roadsport Challenge

=== Former events ===
- Asian Touring Car Series (2000–2005, 2009–2011)
- F4 Chinese Championship
  - Macau Grand Prix (2020–2022)
- FIA F3 World Cup
  - Macau Grand Prix (2016–2019, 2023)
- Porsche Carrera Cup Asia (2003–2007)
- TCR Asia Series (2015–2016, 2021–2022)
- TCR China Touring Car Championship (2020, 2023)
- TCR International Series
  - Guia Race of Macau (2015–2016)
- World Touring Car Championship
  - FIA WTCC Race of Macau (2005–2014, 2017)
- World Touring Car Cup
  - FIA WTCR Race of Macau (2018–2019)

== Lap records ==
Italics indicate discontinued class. In 2003, Ralph Firman, winner of the 1996 F3 race, set a lap time of 1:55.714 during a demonstration event as part of the Macau Grand Prix's 50th anniversary celebrations in a Jordan EJ13 Formula 1 car. As of November 2026, the fastest official race lap records at the Guia Circuit are listed as:

Category	Time	Driver	Vehicle	Date
Grand Prix Circuit (1993–present): 6.120 km (3.803 mi) (Note: The start line was moved backwards in 1993.)
Formula 3	2:06.257	(United Kingdom) Luke Browning	Dallara F3 2019	18 November 2023
Formula Regional	2:14.652	(Argentina) Mattia Colnaghi	Tatuus F3 T-318	21 November 2026
GT3	2:15.665	(Germany) Laurin Heinrich	Porsche 911 GT3 R (992 II)	21 November 2026
Formula 4	2:22.232	(United States) Kenzo Craigie	Tatuus F4-T421	22 November 2026
Superbike	2:22.697	(United Kingdom) Peter Hickman	BMW M1000RR	21 November 2026
Formula Renault 2.0	2:23.135	(United States) Scott Speed	Tatuus FR2000	21 November 2004
Guia Race (WTCC TC1)	2:26.469	(United Kingdom) Rob Huff	Citroën C-Elysée WTCC	18 November 2017
Porsche Carrera Cup	2:27.343	(Hong Kong) Darryl O'Young	Porsche 911 GT3 Cup	18 November 2007
Guia Race (Super Touring)	2:29.253	(United Kingdom) Steve Soper	BMW 320i	16 November 1997
Formula BMW	2:29.449	(United Kingdom) William Buller	Mygale FB02	22 November 2009
GT4	2:29.690	(China) Han Lichao	Toyota GR Supra GT4 EVO2	22 November 2026
TCR	2:29.768	(Hungary) Norbert Michelisz	Hyundai Elantra N TCR	18 November 2023
Asian Formula 2000	2:30.052	(France) Philippe Descombes	Argo-Ford Zetec 1.8	18 November 2001
Guia Race (Super 2000)	2:31.437	(France) Yvan Muller	Chevrolet Cruze WTCC	17 November 2013
Roadsport	2:32.974	(Japan) Manabu Orido	Nissan GT-R	21 November 2010
Guia Race (Super Production)	2:39.634	(United Kingdom) Simon Harrison	Honda Integra Type-R	16 November 2003
Supercar Race	2:41.877	(Hong Kong) Kevin Wong	Porsche 911 GT3 R	19 November 2000
ACMC Race	2:42.591	(Hong Kong) Cheung Wai On	Honda RS125	16 November 2003
Volkswagen Scirocco R-Cup	2:46.183	(Netherlands) Duncan Huisman	Volkswagen Scirocco R	16 November 2013
Interport Race	2:48.216	(Macau) Alvaro Mourato	Honda Integra Type-R	21 November 2010
CTM Cup (Super 1600)	2:46.990	(Hong Kong) Paul Poon	Peugeot RCZ	22 November 2015
Chinese Cup	2:58.203	(China) David Zhu	Senova D70	19 November 2016
Grand Prix Circuit (1958–1992): 6.120 km
Group A	2:29.740	(Germany) Bernd Schneider	Mercedes-Benz 190 E 2.5-16 EVO II	22 November 1992
Group 5	2:37.720	(West Germany) Manfred Winkelhock	BMW 320i	15 November 1981
Group 2	2:44.820	(West Germany) Hans Heyer	Ford Escort II RS	19 November 1978
Group 6	2:59.800	(Switzerland) Mauro Bianchi	Alpine A210	20 November 1966
Group 4	3:05.300	(Hong Kong) Albert Poon	Lotus 23	15 November 1964
Formula Junior	3:10.100	(Philippines) Arsénio Laurel	Lotus 22	18 November 1962

== Appearances in video games ==
Simulation / Video Game	Year	Configuration		
Simulation / Video Game	Year	1954	1993	2014
Race - The Official WTCC Game	2006	Yes	No	
RaceRoom	2013		No	Yes
Race 07	2007	Yes	No	
Ride 2	2016		-	-
Project Gotham Racing 4 (Fictional)	2007		-	-
Race Pro	2009	Yes	No	
TT Superbikes Real Road Racing	2005		PS2	No

== See also ==
- Macau Grand Prix
- Macau Guia Race
- TCR World Tour
- World Touring Car Championship
