= Blimey! Games =

British video game company

- Company type: Private
- Industry: Video games
- Founded: May 2005
- Defunct: 8 January 2009
- Successor: Slightly Mad Studios
- Headquarters: London

Blimey! Games was an entertainment software development company in central London. The CEO was Ian Bell, formerly managing director and founder of SimBin development team.

Blimey! Games comprised a specialist development team of 60 based in locations around the world.

== History ==
The company was founded in May 2005 by the development team who produced the PC driving game GTR – FIA GT Racing Game in 2004.

Blimey! Games also formed the core development team of GTR 2 – FIA GT Racing Game, and sports car racing game, GT Legends.

In 2006, Blimey! Games, along with their publishers 10tacle Studios AG, signed a licence agreement for the development of video games with automotive manufacturer Ferrari.

Following the insolvency of 10tacle in 2008, on 8 January 2009, Blimey! went into administration with the staff being hired by and the business and assets being sold to Slightly Mad Studios Limited, a company that had also been established by Bell.

== Games ==
Year	Game	Publisher
2006	GTR 2 – FIA GT Racing Game (with SimBin)	10tacle studios AG
2007	BMW M3 Challenge	10tacle studios AG
