= V8 Thunder Cars =

Swedish car racing series

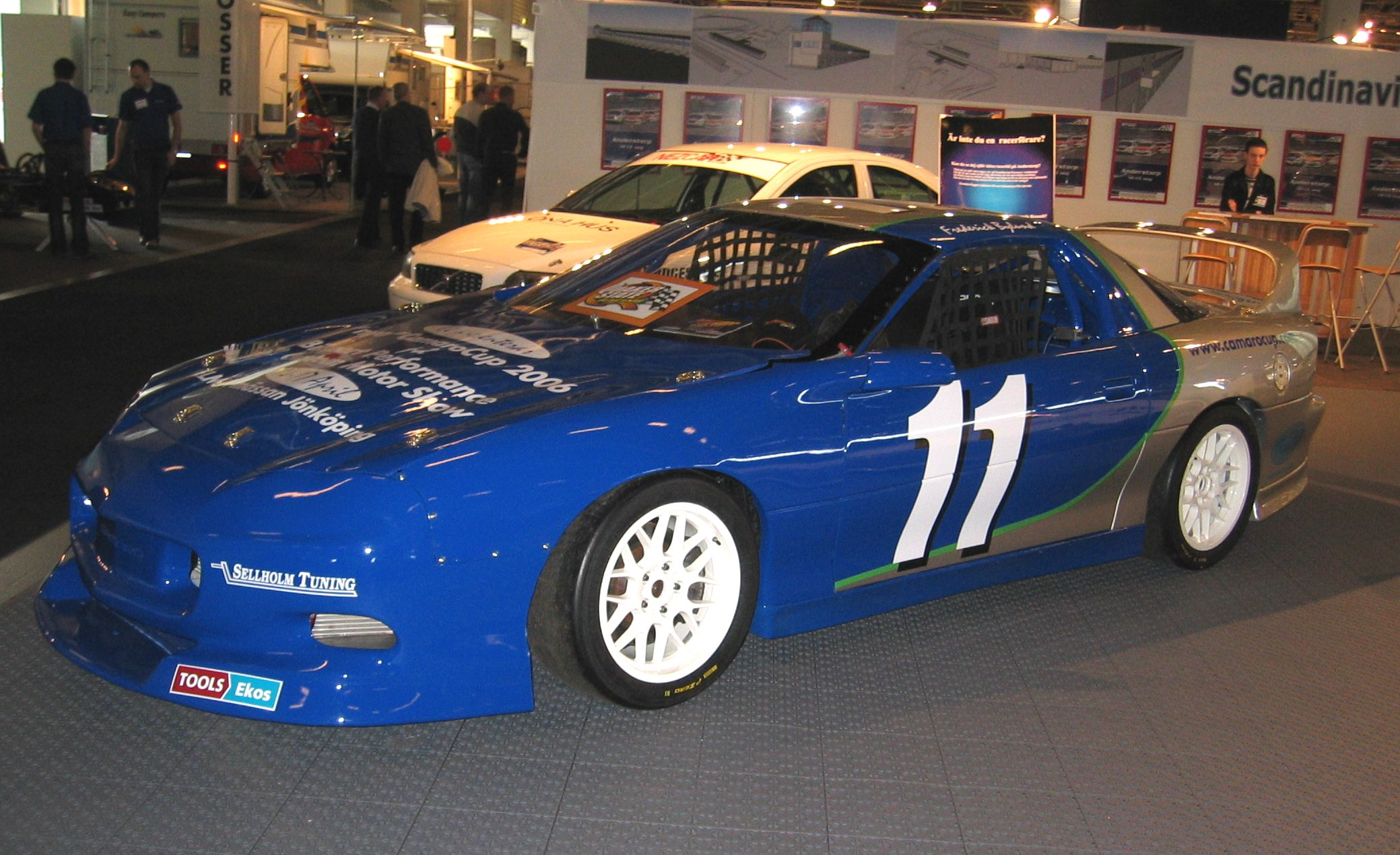
2006 Camaro Cup car

V8 Thunder Cars, previously Camaro Cup or the Camaro Cup 2000, is a Swedish-based stock car racing series.

== History ==
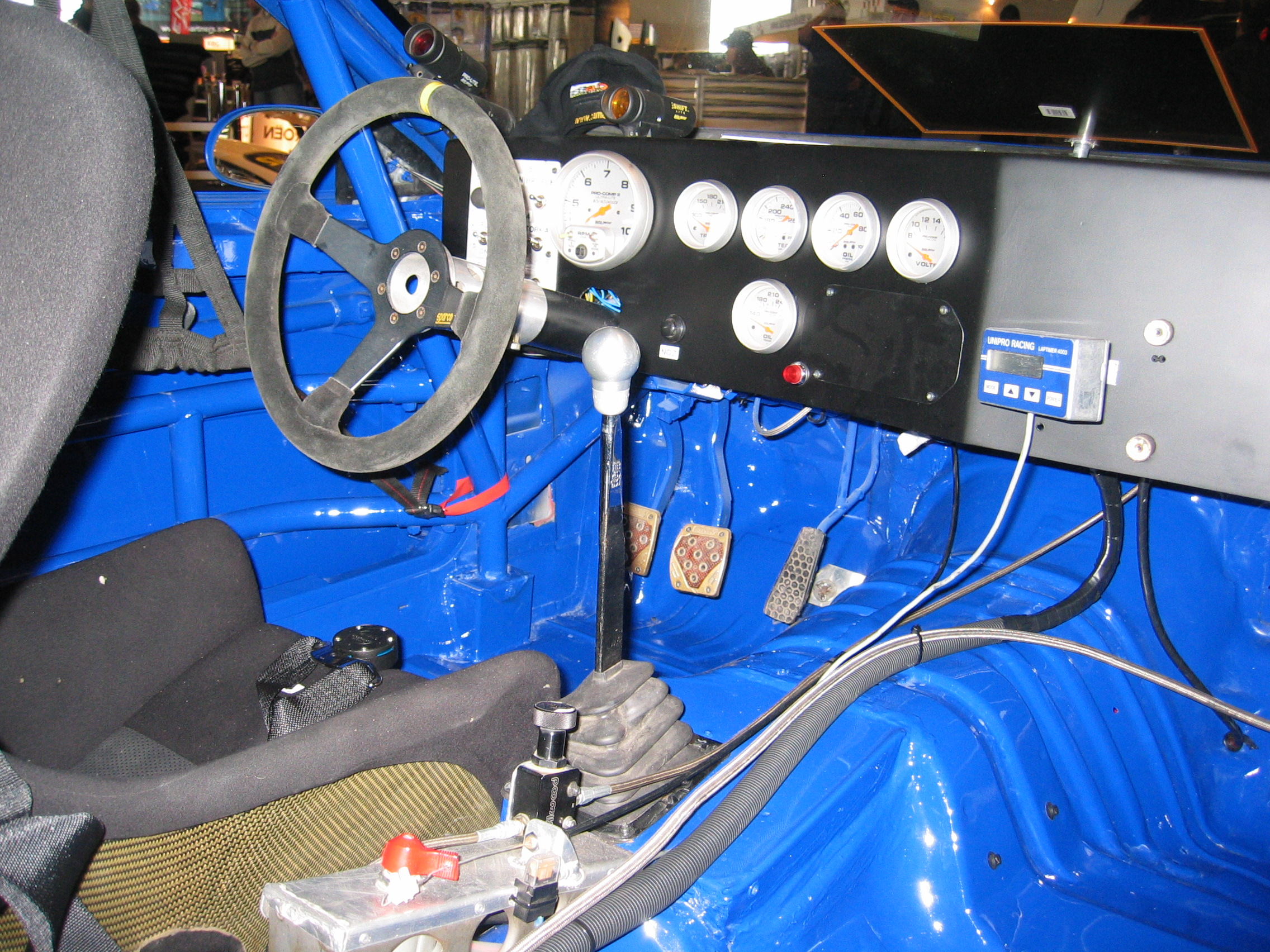
2006 Camaro Cup car interior

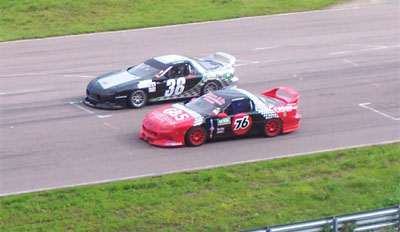
Two Fourth-generation Camaro Cup Cars on the starting grid.

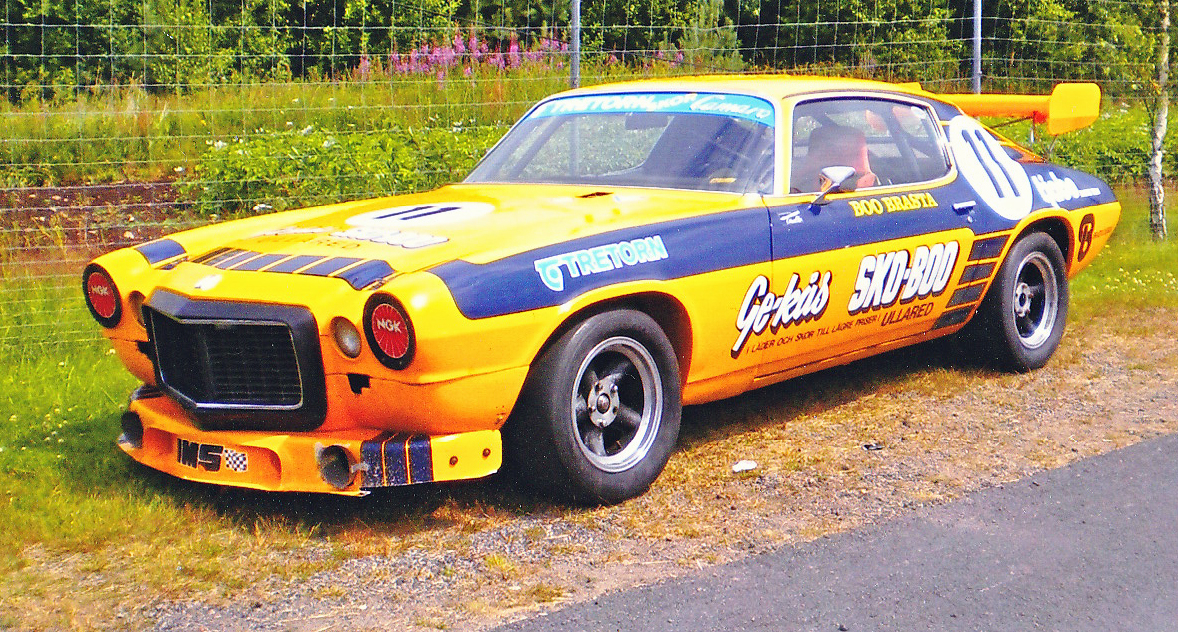
Boo Brasta's 1978/1979 season Camaro

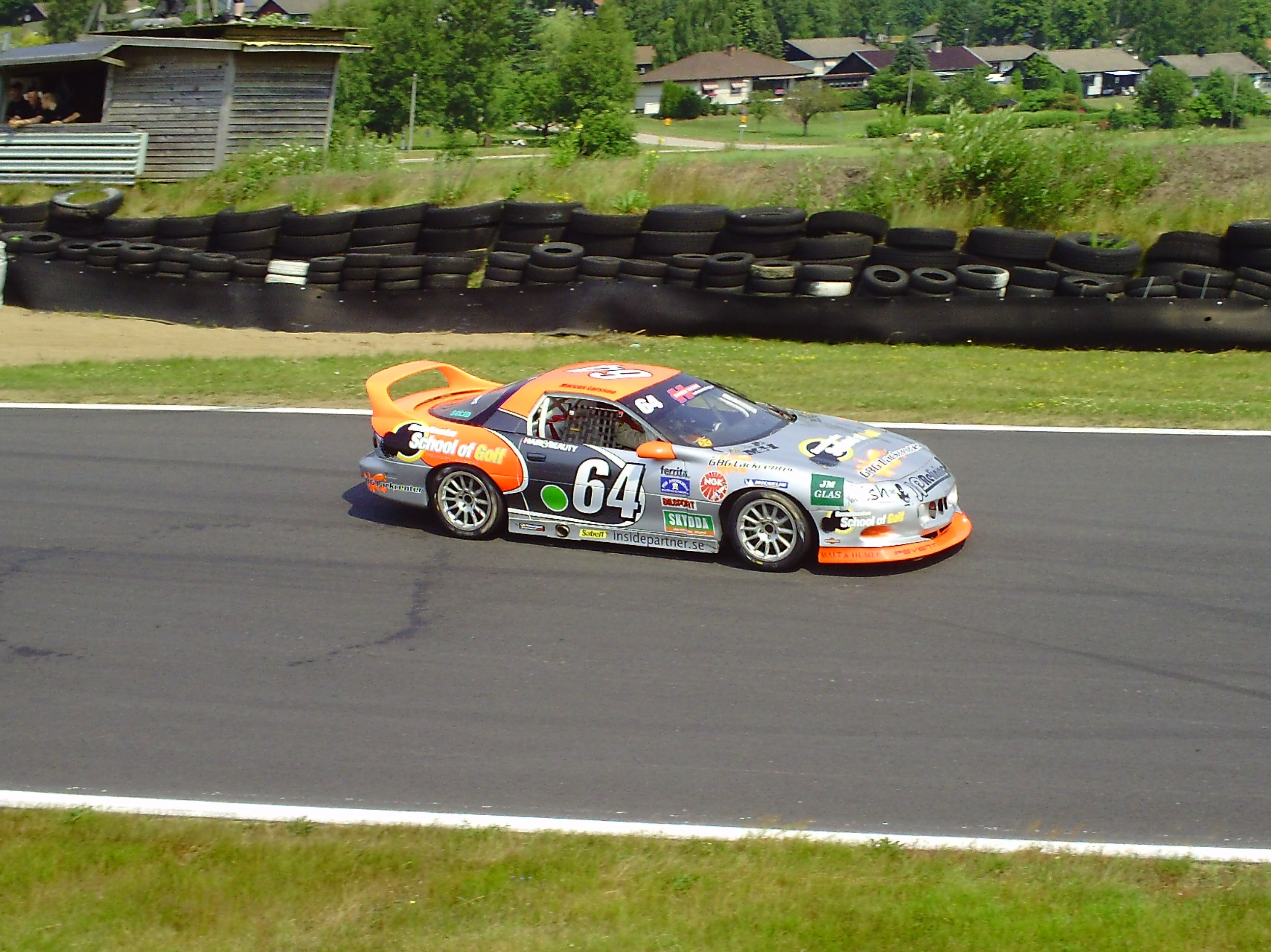
Marcus Larsson's Chevrolet Camaro Gen-4 at Falkenbergs Motorbana in 2010

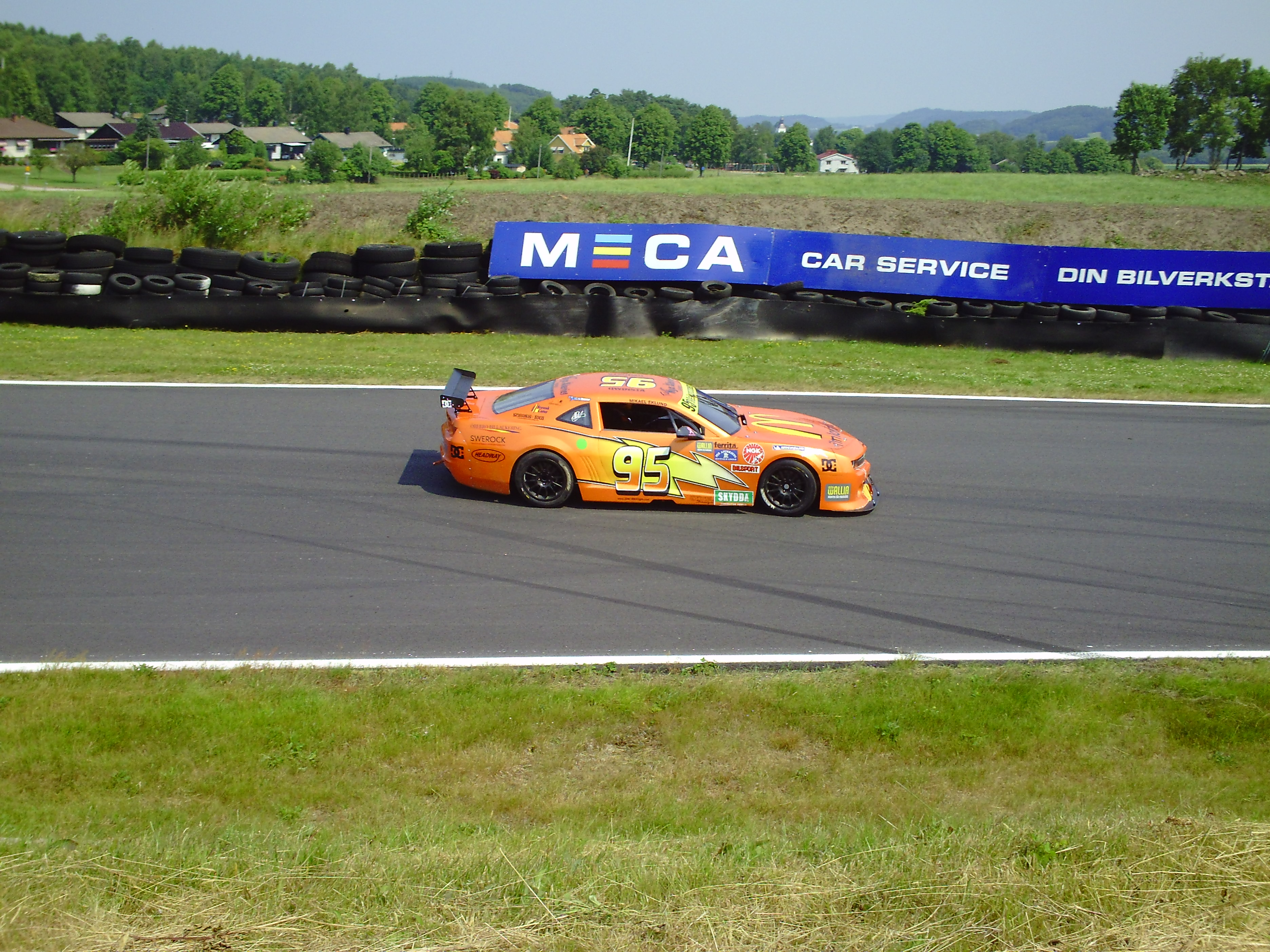
Mikael Eklund's Chevrolet Camaro Gen-5 at Falkenbergs Motorbana in 2010

The idea about an American class in Swedish racing was born by the SSK acting director Robin Shorter in 1974. He spread his idea to active racers and to dealers selling American car brands. Work was begun by a group of people, including Shorter, Sven Hjansons, Picko Troberg and Göran Boström, to start a series called the Woodhead Super Star Cup. The first season was held in 1975 and was won by Bo Emanuelsson, who also won the first ever race of the championship, held at the SSK premiere at Kinnekulle Ring. The series continued for several more seasons and had a couple of famous drivers including Swedish Formula One driver Reine Wisell. 1982 saw the class being changed into the Swedish Super Saloon championship and it was opened for other manufacturers.
Super Saloon was a somewhat extreme championship concerning the cars participating - e.g. Volkswagens and Porsches with double turbos. Some of the old Camaro Cup drivers stayed, including two-times champion Peter Norlander who won the premiere in a space frame Camaro. In 1988 Camaro Cup was resumed, with Boström being one of the driving forces behind the series' resumption. Between 1994 and 1998 the series was dominated by Thomas Engström, winning five driver's titles.
The first cars of the current generation of Camaro Cup cars took to the track in 1999. The old cars were phased out during 2000, when two classes (one with the new cars and one with the old cars) was run. Some of the old cup cars later found a new home in the V8 Challenge championship organized by the Swedish Long-distance Championship (SLC). During 2000 the series was called Super Stock Racing.

Camaro Cup had for several years run as a support series to the Swedish Touring Car Championship, but in 2004 it was axed and was forced to return to its SSK roots. The 2005 season was a miserable one, with an average of six cars per weekend, and the grid never made it over seven cars. To bolster the number of starters other SSK classes were added, including old Super Touring cars such as the Audi A4 Quattro and BMW 320i.
2006 saw the series somewhat return to its former glory. It returned as a part of the STCC program, and grid sizes increased to around 20 cars again. Several notable drivers made guest appearances, including ex-F1 test driver and former Formula Nippon driver Björn Wirdheim, OMV Kronos Citroën WRC driver Daniel Carlsson, Junior WRC champion Per-Gunner Andersson and STCC driver Edward Sandström. As of February 2006, 24 cars have confirmed their entry for the full 2007 season.

Since 2013 the championship is open to other manufacturers and was renamed to V8 Thunder Cars.

== Games ==
Camaro Cup is one of the two available championships (along with STCC) in the Digital Illusions, CE PC game STCC 2. It is also included in SimBin Studios's game STCC – The Game (2008 season) and its sequel STCC – The Game 2 (2010 season).

== Champions ==
Season	Champion
1975	(Sweden) Bo "Emma" Emanuelsson
1976	(Sweden) Ulf Granberg
1977	(Sweden) Bo "Emma" Emanuelsson
1978	(Sweden) Ulf Granberg
1979	(Sweden) Peter Norlander
1980	(Sweden) Peter Norlander
1981	(Sweden) Ulf "Rökar'n" Larsson
1988	(Norway) Anders Berggren
1989	(Sweden) Greger Kronegård
1990	(Sweden) Greger Kronegård
1991	(Sweden) Greger Kronegård
1992	(Sweden) Anders Hultqvist
1993	(Sweden) Anders Hultqvist
1994	(Sweden) Tomas Engström
1995	(Sweden) Tomas Engström
1996	(Sweden) Tomas Engström
1997	(Sweden) Tomas Engström
1998	(Sweden) Tomas Engström
1999	(Sweden) Göran Boström
1999	(Sweden) Markus Lundström (Classic)
2000	(Norway) Thomas Nielsen
2000	(Sweden) Jörgen Eriksson (Classic)
2001	(Norway) Ole Martin Lindum
2002	(Norway) Ole Martin Lindum
2003	(Sweden) Kristoffer Lundström
2004	(Sweden) Kristoffer Lundström
2005	(Norway) Ole Martin Lindum
2006	(Norway) Ole Martin Lindum
2007	(Sweden) Anders Brofalk
2008	(Sweden) Anders Brofalk
2009	(Norway) Ole Martin Lindum
2010	(Sweden) Tomas Engström
2011	(Sweden) Thed Björk
2012	(Sweden) Tobias Brink
2013	(Sweden) Fredrik Ros
2014	(Sweden) Jens Edman
2015	(Sweden) Mattias Lindberg
2016	(Sweden) Alexander Graff
2017	(Sweden) Mattias Lindberg
2018	(Sweden) Emil Persson
2019	(Sweden) Emil Persson
2020	(Sweden) Dennis Strandberg
2021	(Sweden) Dennis Strandberg
2022	(Sweden) Andreas Nilsson
2023	(Sweden) Andreas Nilsson
2024	(Sweden) Andreas Nilsson
2025	(Sweden) Tommie Eliasson
2026	TBD
