= Chevrolet Camaro =

Sports car manufactured by Chevrolet (1967-2024)

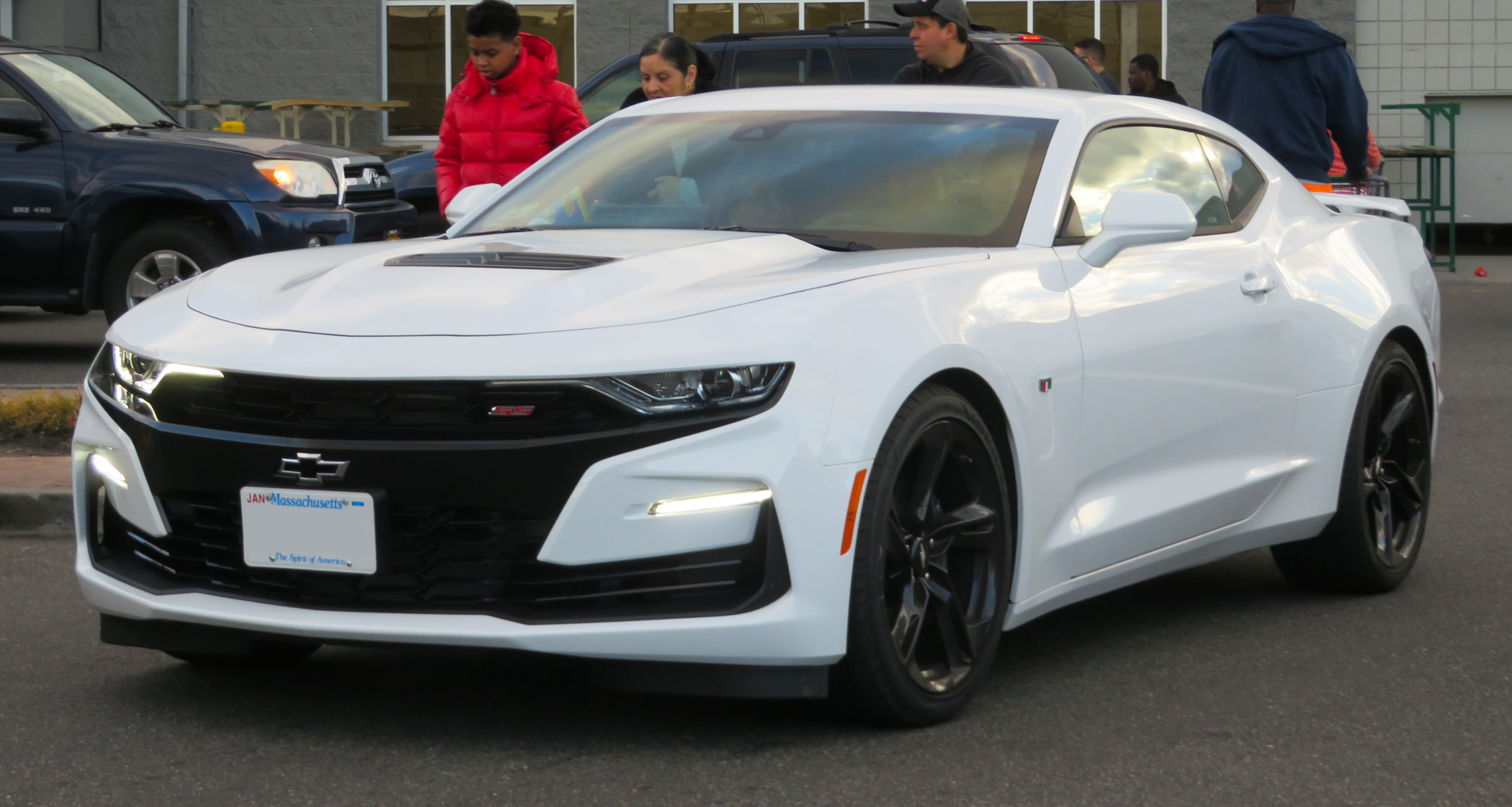
- 2019 Chevrolet Camaro 2SS

Overview
- Manufacturer: Chevrolet (General Motors)
- Production: 1966–2002; 2009–2023
- Model years: 1967–2002; 2010–2024

Body and chassis
- Class: Pony car
- Body style: 2-door coupe; 2-door convertible
- Layout: FR layout
- Platform: F-body (1967–2002); Zeta platform (2010–2015); Alpha platform (2016–2024)

The Chevrolet Camaro is a mid-size American automobile manufactured by Chevrolet, classified as a pony car. It first went on sale on September 29, 1966, for the 1967 model year, and was designed to compete with the Ford Mustang. The Camaro shared its platform and major components with the Firebird, produced by General Motors' Pontiac division, also introduced for the 1967 model year.

Four generations of the Camaro were developed before production ended in 2002. The nameplate was revived on a concept car that evolved into the fifth-generation Camaro; production started on March 16, 2009.

Production of the sixth generation of the Camaro ended in December 2023 for the 2024 model year.

== Background ==
Before any official announcement, reports began running during April 1965 within the automotive press that Chevrolet was preparing a competitor to the Ford Mustang, codenamed "Panther". On June 21, 1966, around 200 automotive journalists received a telegram from General Motors stating, "...please save noon of June 28 for important SEPAW meeting. Hope you can be on hand to help scratch a cat. Details will follow...(signed) John L. Cutter – Chevrolet public relations – SEPAW secretary." The following day, the same journalists received another General Motors telegram stating, "Society for the Eradication of Panthers from the Automotive World will hold first and last meeting on June 28...(signed) John L. Cutter – Chevrolet public relations SEPAW secretary." These telegrams puzzled automotive journalists.

On June 28, 1966, General Motors held a live press conference at Detroit's Statler-Hilton Hotel. It was the first time fourteen cities were connected in real time for a press conference call via telephone lines. Chevrolet general manager Pete Estes started the news conference by stating that all attendees of the conference were charter members of the Society for the Elimination of Panthers from the Automotive World (SEPAW), and that this would be the first and last meeting of SEPAW. Estes then announced a new car line, project designation XP-836, with a name that Chevrolet chose in keeping with other car names beginning with the letter "C", such as the Corvair, Chevelle, Chevy II and Corvette. He claimed the name "suggests the comradeship of good friends as a personal car should be to its owner" and that "to us, the name means just what we think the car will do... go." The "Camaro" name was then unveiled. Automotive press asked Chevrolet product managers, "what is a Camaro?" and were told it was "a small, vicious animal that eats Mustangs," an apparent reference to the Ford Mustang, which created and dominated the pony car market GM was entering.

According to the book The Complete Book of Camaro: Every Model Since 1967, the name "Camaro" was conceived after Chevrolet merchandising manager Bob Lund and GM vice president Ed Rollett found the word while reading the 1936 version of Heath's French and English Dictionary, in which it was defined as slang meaning "friend, pal, or comrade". The article further repeated Estes's statement of what the word "camaro" was meant to imply, that the car's name "suggests the comradeship of good friends, as a personal car should be to its owner". The accepted French word with the closest meaning is "camarade", from which the English word "comrade" is derived.

The Camaro was first shown at a press preview in Detroit on September 12, 1966, and later in Los Angeles on September 19, 1966. The public introduction of the new model was on September 26, 1966. The Camaro officially went on sale in dealerships on September 29, 1966, for the 1967 model year.

== First generation (1967–1969) ==
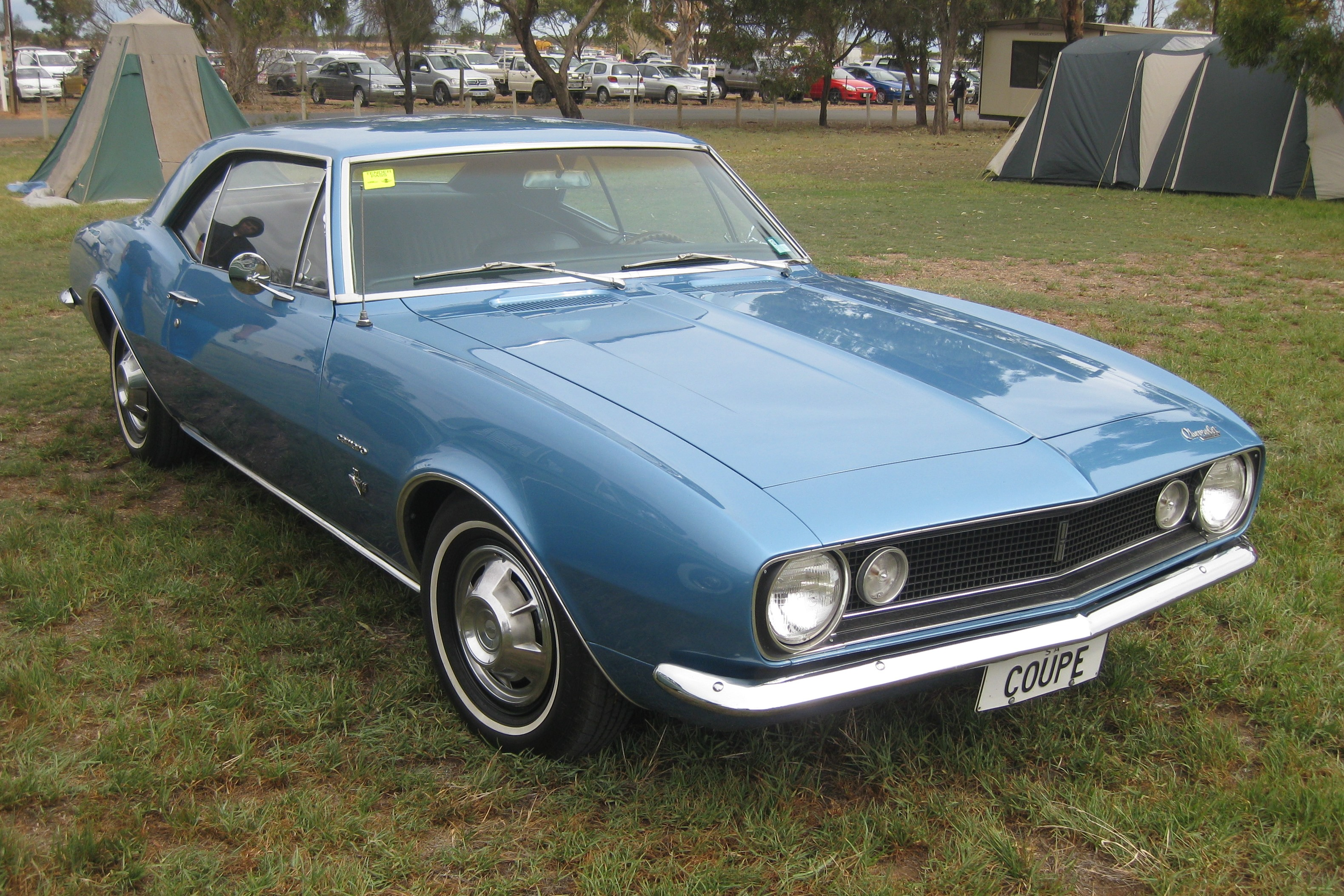
First-generation Camaro (1967 base model shown)

The first-generation Camaro debuted in September 1966. It was produced for the 1967 through 1969 model years on a new rear-wheel drive GM F-body platform as a two-door 2+2 in hardtop coupé and convertible models. The base engine was a 230 cu in (3.8 L) inline-6, with a 250 cu in (4.1 L) straight-six or 302 cu in (4.9 L), 307 cu in (5.0 L), 327 cu in (5.4 L), 350 cu in (5.7 L), and 396 cu in (6.5 L) V8s available as options.

Concerned with the runaway success of the Ford Mustang, Chevrolet executives realized that the sporty version of their compact rear-engine Corvair, the Monza, would not be able to generate the sales volume of the Mustang due to limitations with that layout (including its inability to share the whole range of Chevrolet engines) and declining sales, the latter partly owing to the negative publicity from Ralph Nader's book Unsafe at Any Speed. Therefore, the Camaro was touted for its conventional rear-drive, front-engine configuration, and layout, the same as the Mustang. In addition, the Camaro could borrow parts from the existing Chevy Nova in the same way the Mustang did from the Ford Falcon. The first-generation Camaro lasted until the 1969 model year, and eventually inspired the design of the retro-style fifth-generation Camaro in 2009.

The first-generation Camaro was available in Super Sport, Rally Sport, and high-performance Z/28 models (the last of which went on sale in December 1966). It came with stripes on the hood and trunk (that could be deleted at no charge), styled rally road wheels, and a special 302 cu in (4.9 L) V8 engine that had been developed for Trans-Am Series racing.

== Second generation (1970–1981) ==
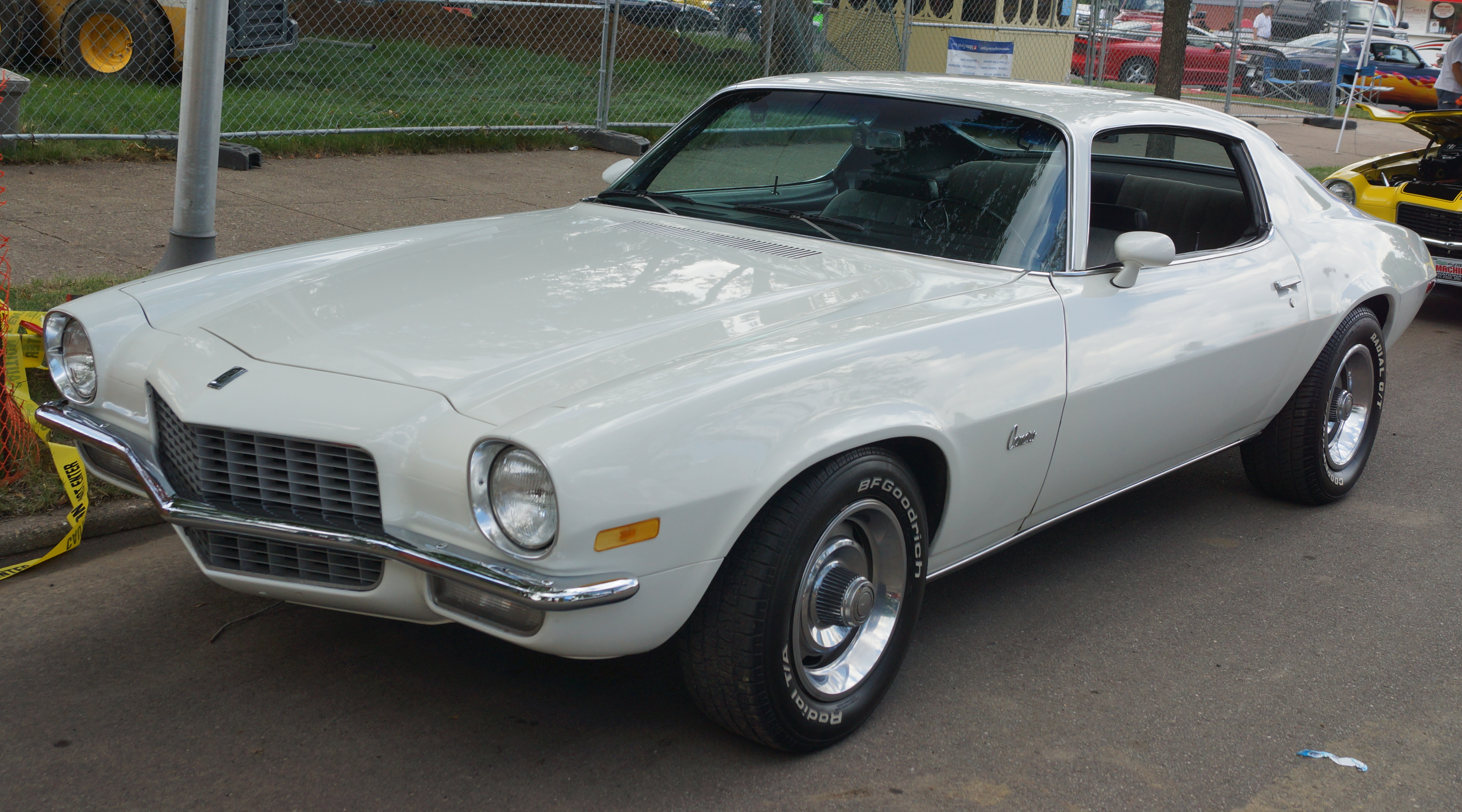
Second-generation Camaro (1970 model shown)

Introduced on February 26, 1970, the second-generation Camaro was produced through the 1981 model year, with cosmetic changes made for the 1974 and 1978 model years. The car was heavily restyled and became larger and wider with the new styling. Based on the F-body platform, the new Camaro was similar to its predecessor. It had a unibody structure, a front subframe, an A-arm front suspension, and leaf springs suspending a solid rear axle. The 1980 and 1981 Z28 models included an air induction hood scoop with an intake door that opened under full throttle. The RS SS package was dropped in 1972 and reintroduced in 1996.

Road & Track magazine named the 1971 SS350 one of the 10 best cars in the world in August 1971.

== Third generation (1982–1992) ==
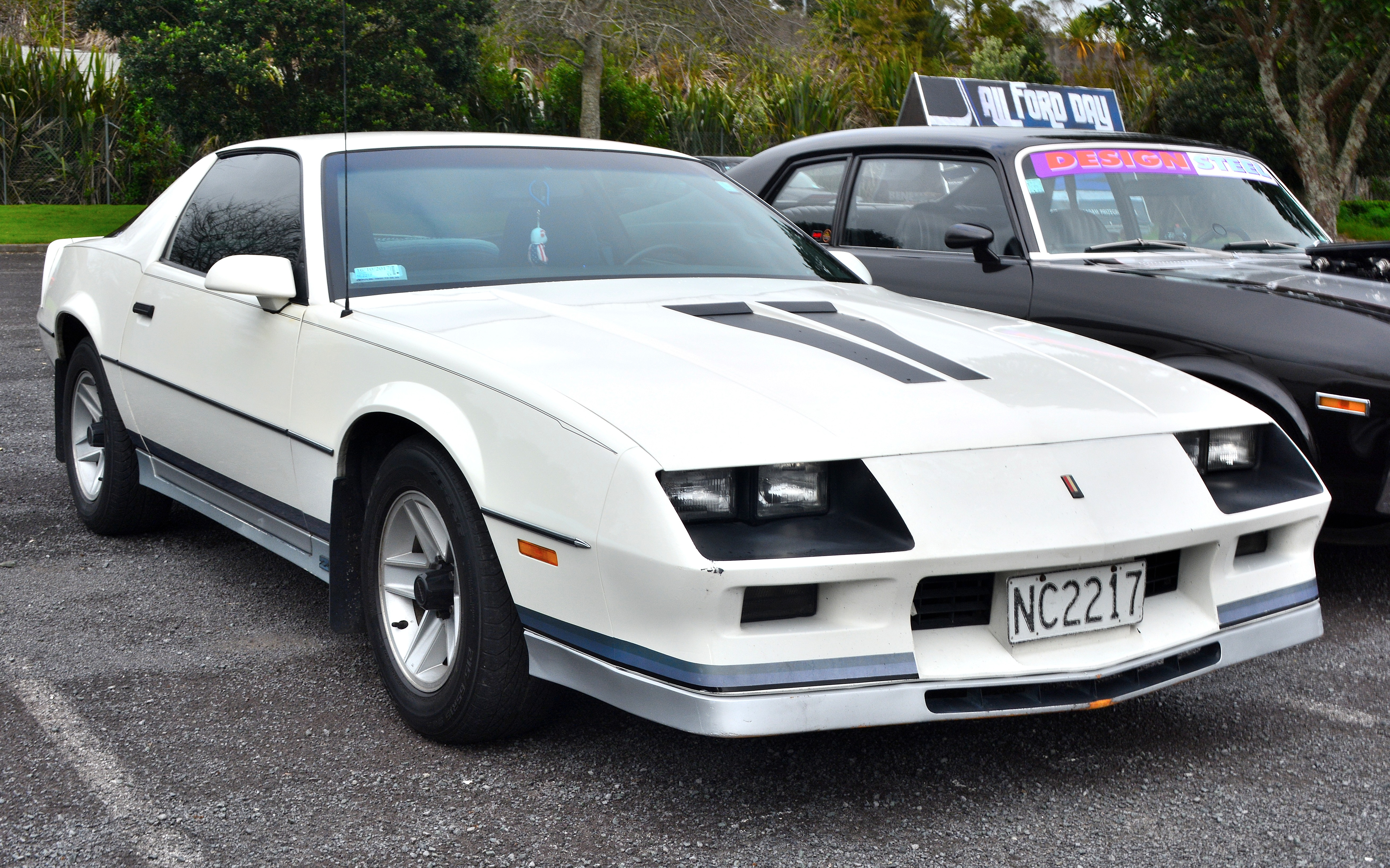
Third-generation Camaro (1984 Z28 model shown)

The third-generation Camaro was produced from 1981 (for the 1982 model year) until 1992. These were the first Camaros to offer modern fuel injection, Turbo-Hydramatic 700R4 four-speed automatic transmissions, five-speed manual transmissions, 14-, 15- or 16-inch road wheels, a standard OHV 4-cylinder engine, and hatchback bodies. The cars were nearly 500 pounds (227 kg) lighter than the second-generation model. The IROC-Z was introduced in 1985 and continued through 1990.

National Highway Traffic Safety Administration (NHTSA) regulations required a CHMSL (Center High Mounted Stop Lamp) starting with the 1986 model year. For 1986, the new brake light was located on the exterior of the upper center area of the back hatch glass. Additionally, the 2.5 L Iron Duke pushrod 4-cylinder engine was dropped, and all base models now came with the 2.8 L V6 (OHV). For 1987 and later, the CHMSL was either mounted inside the upper hatch glass or integrated into a rear spoiler (if equipped). In 1985, the 305 cu in (5.0 L) small block V8 was available with indirect injection called "tuned port injection" (TPI). In 1987, the L98 350 cu in (5.7 L) V8 engine became a regular option on the IROC-Z, paired with an automatic transmission only. The convertible body style returned in 1987 after being last produced in 1969, and all models came with a unique "20th Anniversary Commemorative Edition" leather map pocket. The 1992 models offered a "25th Anniversary Heritage Package" with stripes and a unique spoiler plaque. In 1988, the 1LE performance package was introduced, optional on street models and for showroom stock racing in the U.S. and Canada. The B4C, or "police" package, was made available in 1991. This created a Z28 in more subtle RS styling.

== Fourth generation (1993–2002) ==
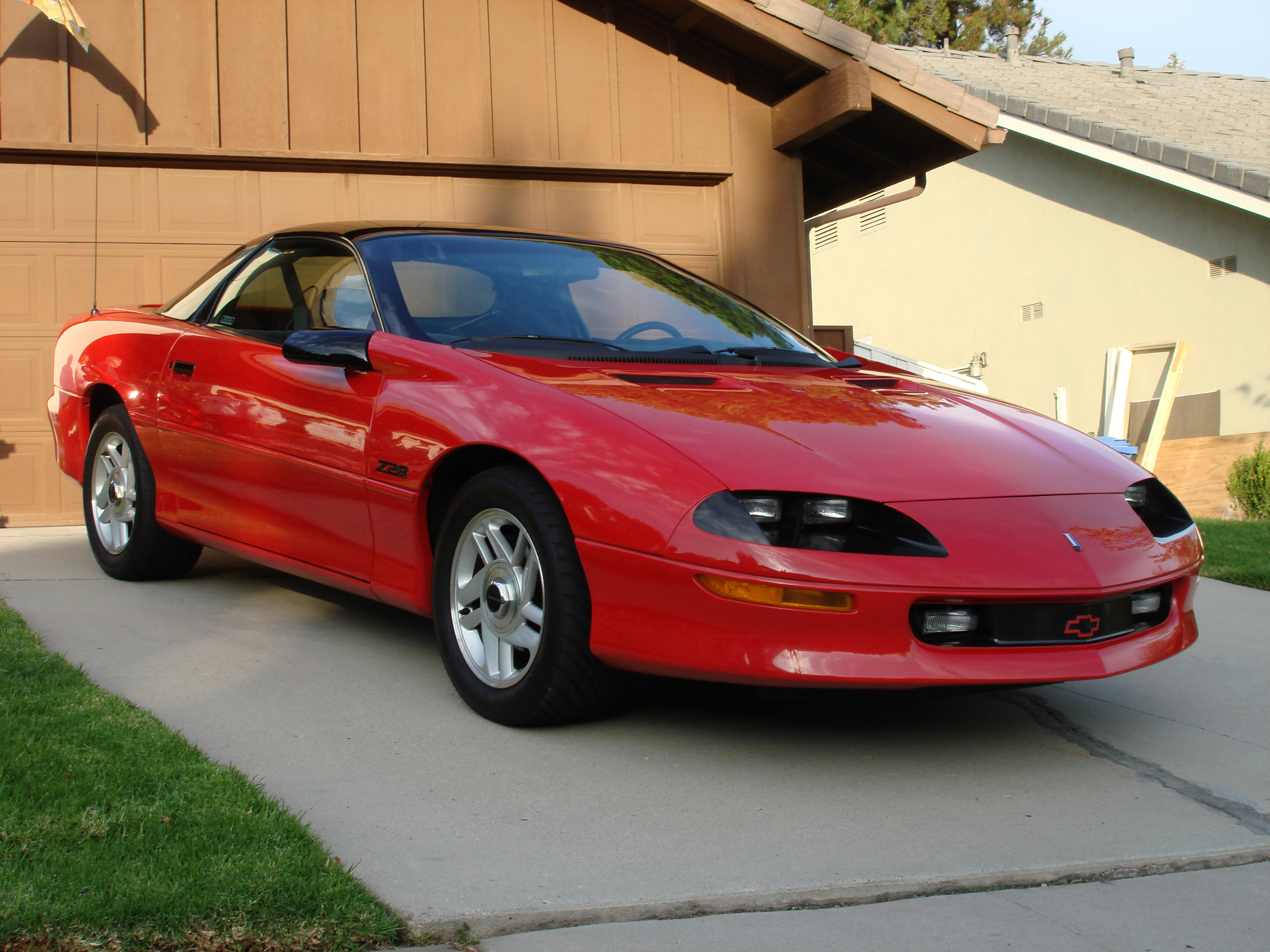
Fourth-generation Camaro (1993 Z28 model shown)

The fourth-generation Camaro debuted in 1993 on an updated F-body platform. It retained the same characteristics since its introduction in 1967: a coupé body style with 2+2 seating (with an optional T-top roof) or convertible (reintroduced in 1994), rear-wheel drive, pushrod 6-cylinder, and V8 engines. The standard engine from 1993 through 1995 was a 3.4 L V6; a 3.8 L V6 was introduced in 1995. A 350 MPFI (LT1) Small Block V-8 engine, which was introduced in the Corvette in 1992, was standard in the Z28. Optional equipment included all-speed traction control and a new six-speed T-56 manual transmission; the 4L60E 4-speed automatic transmission was standard on the Z28. The automatic transmission was optional on the V6 models, which came with a 5-speed manual. Anti-lock brakes were standard equipment on all Camaros.

A limited quantity of the SS version (1996-1997) came with the 330 hp (246 kW; 335 PS) LT4 small block engine from the Corvette, although most were equipped with the 275 hp (205 kW; 279 PS) LT1 version. The 1997 model included a revised interior, and the 1998 models included exterior styling changes and a switch to GM's aluminum block LS1 used in the Corvette C5. In 1998, the 5.7 L LS1 was the first all-aluminum engine offered in a Camaro since the 1969 ZL-1 and was rated at 305 hp (227 kW; 309 PS). The SS versions (1998-2002) received slightly improved exhaust and intake systems, bigger wheels and tires, a slightly revised suspension for improved handling and grip while retaining ride comfort, an arc-shaped rear wing for downforce, and different gearing ratios for faster acceleration, over the Z28 models. Chevrolet offered a 35th anniversary edition for the 2002 model year.

Production of the F-Body platform was discontinued due to slowing sales, a deteriorating market for sports coupés, and plant overcapacity, but an entirely new platform went on sale in 2009. The B4C Special Service Package for police agencies was carried over from the third generation and was marketed between 1993 and 2002.

== Fifth generation (2010–2015) ==
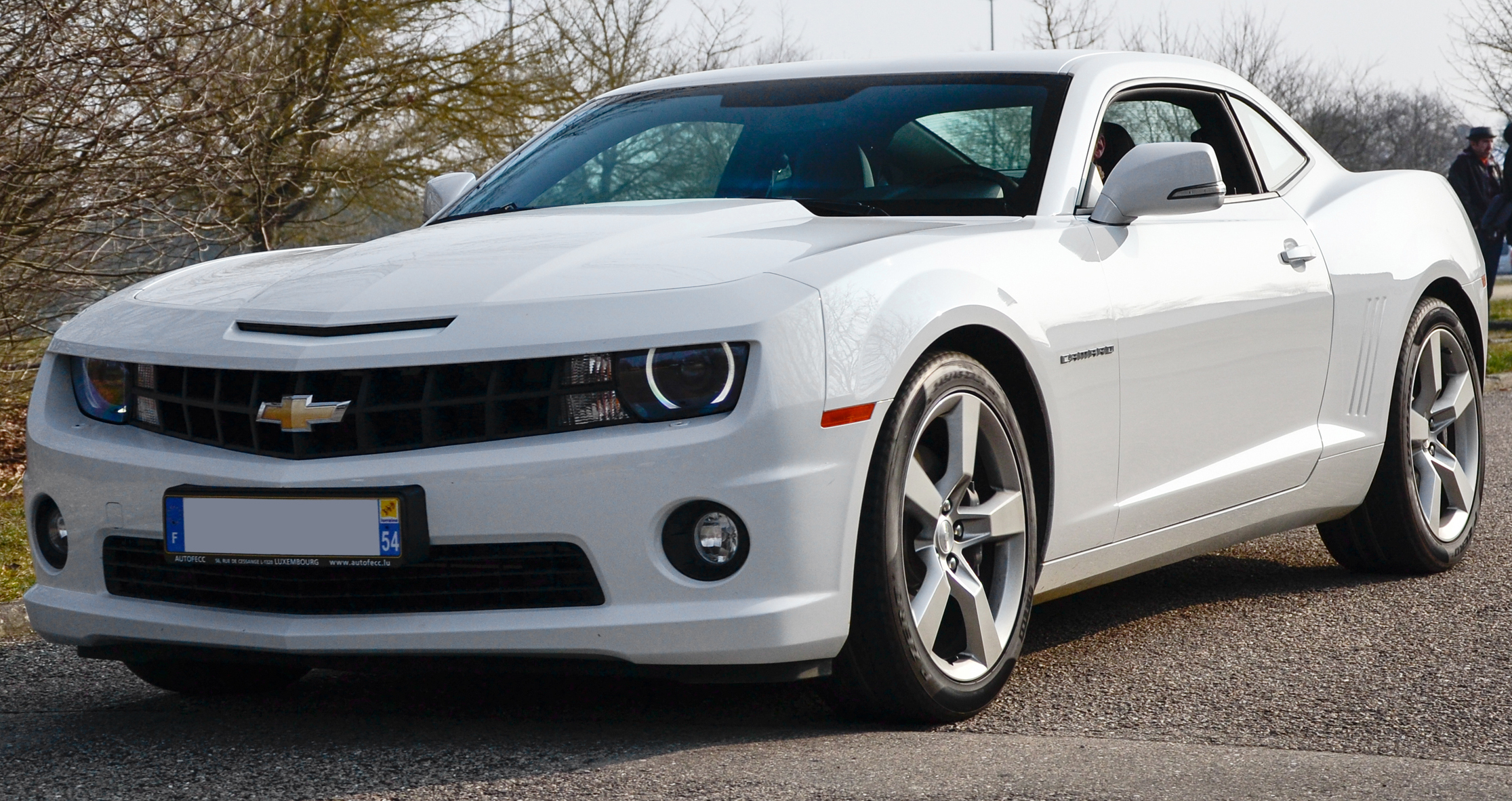
Fifth-generation Camaro

The Camaro received a complete redesign and new platform in 2009 for the 2010 model year. Based on the 2006 Camaro Concept and 2007 Camaro Convertible Concept, production of the fifth-generation Camaro was approved on August 10, 2006. The Oshawa Car Assembly plant in Oshawa, Ontario, Canada, began producing the new Camaro, which went on sale in spring of 2009 as a 2010 model.

The new body used styling cues from the 1969 Camaro, including the grille, roof styling, quarter windows and side trim. Unlike the 1969 model and the 2006 concept, the production model's quarter windows were fixed and hid a thick B-pillar behind the glass.

Following the development of the Zeta architecture and because of its position as the GM global center of RWD development, Holden in Australia led the final design, engineering, and development of the Camaro. Production of the coupé began on March 16, 2009, in LS, LT, and SS trim levels. LS and LT models include a 3.6 L (220 cu in) V6 producing 312 hp (233 kW; 316 PS) for the 2010 and 2011 models mated to either a 6-speed manual or a 6-speed automatic with manual shift. The SS features the 6.2 L (376 cu in) LS3 V8 producing 426 hp (318 kW; 432 PS) and is paired with a 6-speed manual. The automatic SS has the L99 V8 rated at 400 hp (298 kW; 406 PS). The RS appearance package available on the LT and SS featured 20-inch wheels with a darker gray tone, halo rings around xenon headlamps, a unique spoiler, and red RS or SS badges.

In addition to the original 2012 LS model, Chevrolet offered a 2LS model with a 2.92 rear axle ratio that increased fuel economy. The base engine 2012 model had a higher redline than previous V6 models, now reaching 7200 rpm. Almost all 2LS models had various styles of rear spoilers.

On April 1, 2010, the Camaro was named the World Car Design of the Year at the World Car of the Year Awards.

In late January 2011, production of the 2011 Camaro Convertibles started. In November 2011, the export version (excluding the Japanese version) of the Camaro was introduced after a two-year delay. The delay was due to unexpected domestic demand.

Although not in continuous production for the entire period, the 2012 model year marked the 45th anniversary of the Camaro, and this was commemorated with a special edition model. For 2012, the V6 was updated to a 3.6 L "LFX" engine producing 323 hp (241 kW). The SS model received an upgrade to the suspension system. All models received the RS spoiler and taillight details, steering wheel-mounted volume and radio controls, and Bluetooth connectivity controls as standard. The 2012 ZL1 Camaro included a 6.2 L LSA supercharged V8 producing 580 hp (430 kW). This engine was first used in the Cadillac CTS-V for the 2009 model year. Other features included a two-stage exhaust, the addition of sueded microfiber seats, steering wheel, and shift knob, as well as ZL1-exclusive 20-inch aluminum wheels. In 2012, Chevrolet unveiled the production of the 2013 Camaro ZL1 Convertible.

The 2014 Camaro was unveiled at the 2013 New York Auto Show, with a refreshed body style and the return of a Z/28 model. Upgrades included a slimmer grille along with a larger lower fascia and new fog lights along with taillights that took styling cues from the original first-generation Camaro. The RS appearance package incorporates LEDs into both the headlights and taillights. The Z/28 model features a high-performance 7.0 L LS7 V8 engine that produces 505 hp (377 kW).

== Sixth generation (2016–2024) ==
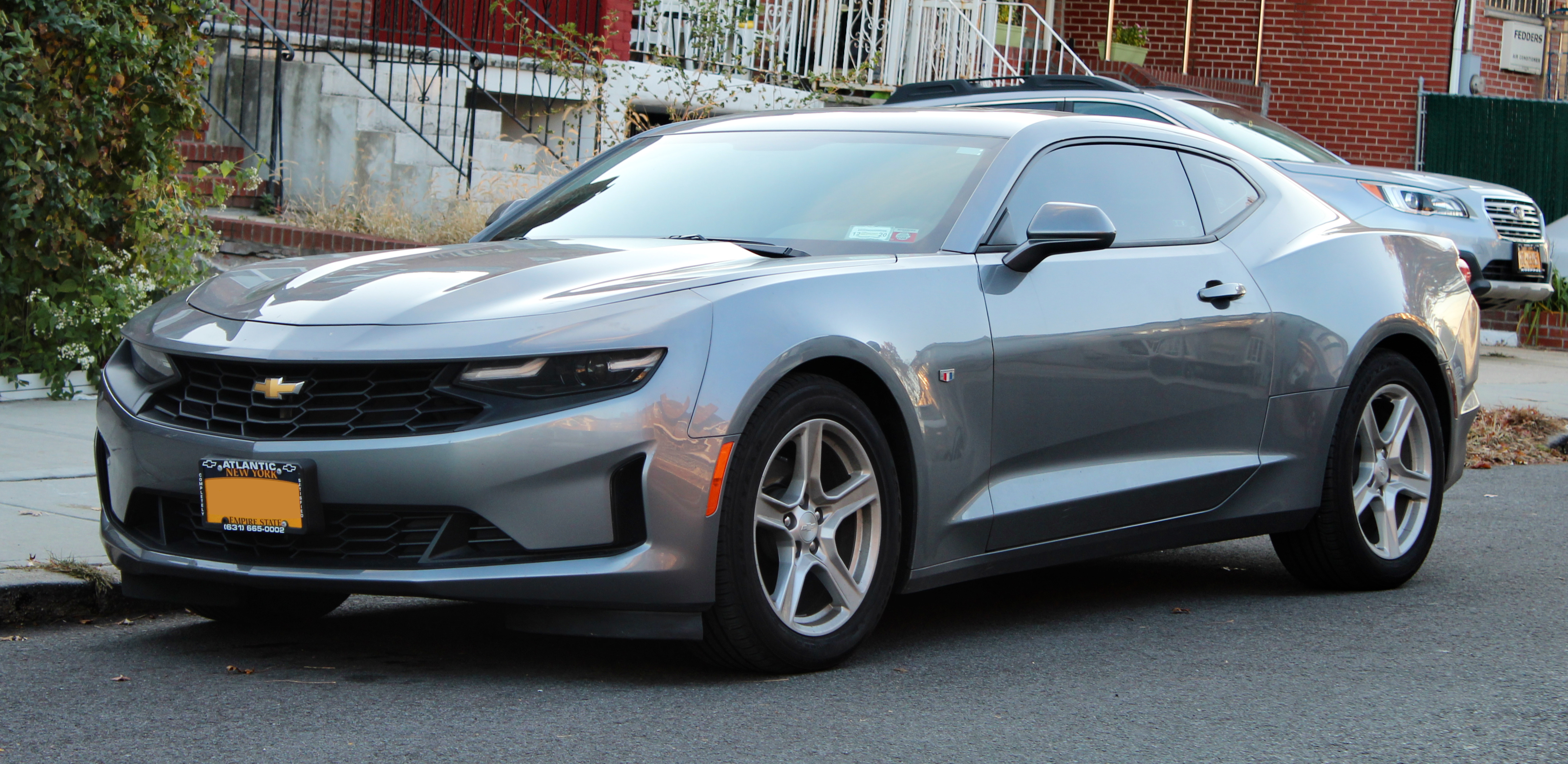
Sixth-generation Camaro

On May 16, 2015, Chevrolet introduced the sixth-generation Camaro at Belle Isle Park in Detroit for the 2016 model year. The launch, complete with previous generation Camaros on display, coincided with the vehicle's 50th birthday. Using the GM Alpha platform shared with the Cadillac ATS, and manufactured at Lansing Grand River Assembly in Michigan, sales of the sixth-generation Camaro began in late 2015, starting with LT and SS models. The 2016 Camaro weighed 200 lb (91 kg) less than its predecessor. Over 70% of the sixth generation's architectural components are unique to the car and are not shared with any other GM product. Motor Trend named the 2016 Camaro its "Car of the Year".

Early production cars have three engine versions: a 2.0 L turbo-charged inline-four producing 275 hp (205 kW; 279 PS), a new 3.6 L V6 making 335 hp (250 kW; 340 PS), while the SS model features the 6.2 L LT1 V8 with 455 hp (339 kW; 461 PS); the ZL1 model will use a supercharged 650 hp (485 kW; 659 PS) LT4 based on the Corvette Z06. The transmissions are either a six-speed manual or an eight-speed automatic (the 2017 ZL1 shares the six-speed manual, but has an optional ten-speed automatic transmission with paddle shift).

The 1LE performance package returned to the Camaro for the 2017 model year. The package built off the success of the previous generation 1LE, offering increased handling and track performance. In response to customer demand, Chevrolet offered two 1LE packages for V6 and V8 models, each visually distinguished with a satin black vinyl-wrapped hood and specific wheels. This prevents the sun from glaring into the driver's view when racing on a track. The 2017 ZL1 Camaro has a top speed of 198 mph, and a Nürburgring Nordschleife lap time of 7:29.60.

Alongside the 1LE package, Chevrolet launched the 50th Anniversary Edition of the Camaro for the 2017 model year. This special edition commemorated the car's legacy with unique features both inside and out. The Nightfall Gray Metallic exterior color (with a black top on convertible models) and exclusive 20-inch 50th Anniversary wheels set it apart. The edition also included specific 50th Anniversary stripes, badges, a unique grille with satin chrome accents, and a body-colored front splitter. Inside, the car featured a black leather interior with sueded microfiber inserts, orange accent stitching, and special treatments on the instrument panel, seatbacks, steering wheel, and illuminated sill plates. Available on the 2LT and 2SS coupe and convertible models, this edition carried the GM RPO code H50.

For the 2018 model year, Chevrolet introduced the ZL1 1LE package for the Camaro. The new package tested three seconds faster around General Motors' Milford Road Course than the next-fastest ZL1 Camaro. The ZL1 1LE performance package introduces improved aerodynamics, a new racing-inspired adjustable suspension, and new lightweight forged aluminum wheels with Goodyear Eagle F1 Supercar 3R tires created especially for the ZL1 1LE. Overall, the new performance package reduces the car's weight by 60 lb (27 kg) over the ZL1. The ZL1 1LE shares the ZL1's supercharged 650 hp (485 kW; 659 PS) LT4 engine paired with a six-speed manual transmission with Active Rev Match. The 2018 ZL1 1LE, a manual transmission model driven by Camaro ride and handling engineer Bill Wise, clocked a Nurburgring Nordschleife time of 7:16.04, a substantial 13.56 seconds faster than the 2017 model's non-1LE ZL1 with automatic transmission.

The Camaro received a facelift for the 2019 model year, with the LS, LT, and SS models gaining a new set of LED headlights and revised fascia designs. The SS also received these upgrades and a new "polished black grille", which was received negatively. The rear fascia featured new split taillights colored red on the LS and LT and a unique clear lens on the SS and ZL1. The ZL1's front end remained unchanged, but gained a new set of spoilers. Four color choices, two blues, one gray, and one yellow, were removed and replaced with two new shades of gray and a darker shade of blue, Riverside Blue Metallic. Old LPO trim accessories were discontinued and replaced with either standard features or updated options. The interior received Chevrolet's new "Infotainment 3" system (which replaced their aging MyLink system), with a standard backup camera to meet updated US federal regulations. The SS trim was available with a new 10-speed transmission for the V8. The LS Convertible was discontinued and the LT was offered with a new 3LT coupe and convertible combo. Some trim packages previously only for the SS were also made available for the LT. For the ZL1 1LE, the Turbo I4 was revised to have a higher power output and gained a Track Performance Package; the remainder was unchanged. The update was met with overall acclaim, with emphasis on driving, but certain news outlets were particularly harsh on the SS's updated design. Christian Seabaugh of Motor Trend called it "botched plastic surgery", and went as far to suggest that Chevrolet docked the design staff's pay to cover the engineering staff's raise.

The 2020 model year facelift fixed the stylistic criticisms of the 2019 model by redesigning the front grille to have a body-colored crossbar, moving the bowtie logo to the upper grille, and reshaping the front headlights.

== Racing ==
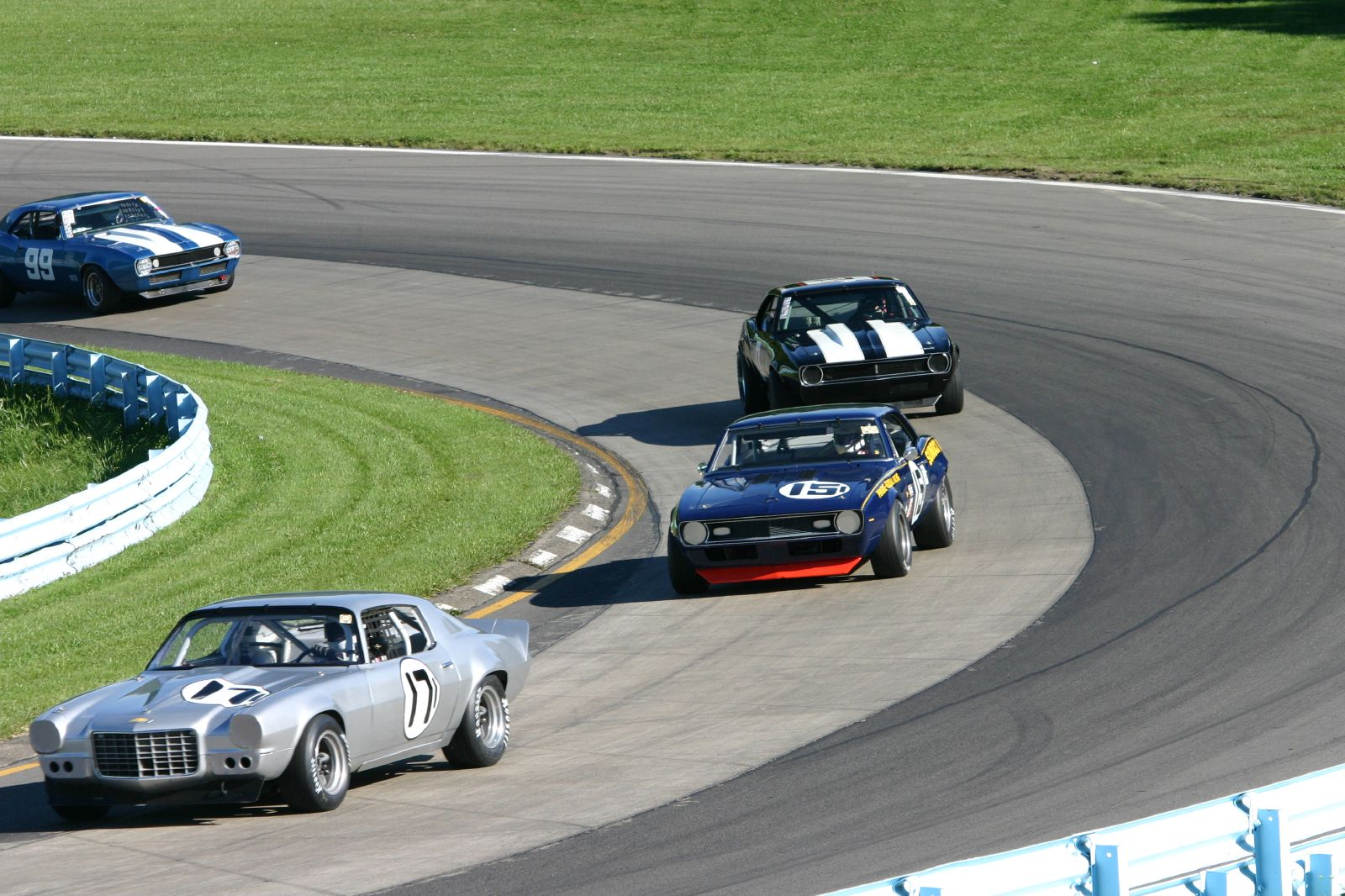
A Vintage Trans-Am event featuring a Penske SCCA Camaro

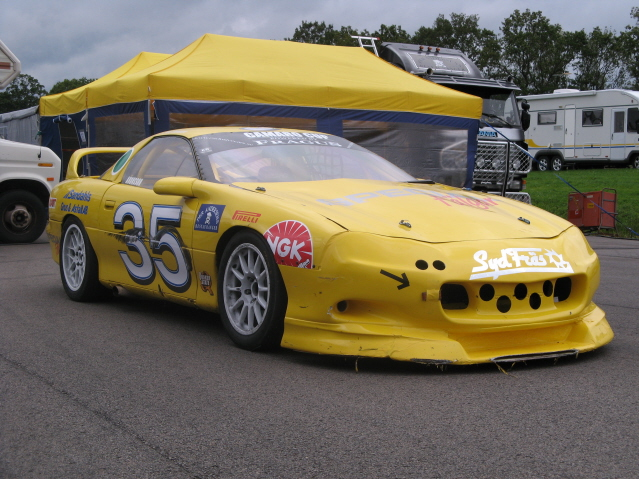
Camaro Cup race car

The Camaro was one of the vehicles in the SCCA-sanctioned Trans-Am Series. Chevrolet worked with Roger Penske to operate their unofficially factory-backed Trans Am team, winning the title in 1968 and 1969 with Mark Donohue. Jim Hall's Chaparral team replaced Penske for the 1970 season.

Bob Jane won both the 1971 and 1972 Australian Touring Car Championships at the wheel of a Camaro.

The Camaro was the official car used in the International Race of Champions starting in 1975 and continuing until 1989. It was the first American car of the series, succeeding the Porsche Carrera RSR.

Camaros compete in drag racing, having won many championships, and can be currently found in several series from the National Hot Rod Association, International Hot Rod Association, and United States Hot Rod Association. Road racing Camaros can currently be found in the Sports Car Club of America's American Sedan series. They have also been used in the Swedish Camaro Cup series since 1975.

The Camaro was the Indianapolis 500 Pace Car in 1967, 1969, 1982, 1993, 2009, 2010, 2011, 2014 and 2016. The Camaro also paced races at Daytona International Speedway, Watkins Glen International, Mosport Park, and Charlotte Motor Speedway. The Camaro was also a regular in the IMSA GT Series.

The fifth-generation Camaro took to the tracks in 2010 in the GT class of the Grand Am Road Racing Championship. Stevenson Motorsports announced that it was seeking to run a two-car team of Pratt & Miller built cars, based on the same spaceframe as the Pontiac GXP-R. The team also competed with Camaros in the Grand Sports class of the Grand-Am's Continental Tire Challenge.

Camaro-styled cars also race in the NASCAR Xfinity Series, with all Chevrolet teams using the body since 2013.

The Camaro ZL1 was introduced in the Monster Energy NASCAR Cup Series in 2018, replacing the discontinued Chevrolet SS. On February 18, 2018, Austin Dillon won the Daytona 500 in the ZL1's debut. In the 2020 season, Chase Elliott won the Camaro's first NASCAR championship in the last race of the season.

NASCAR and Hendrick Motorsports fielded a Garage 56 concept car entry based on the Camaro ZL1 NASCAR Cup Series Next Gen stock car for the 2023 24 Hours of Le Mans. NASCAR celebrated their 75th anniversary that year, which also coincided with the race's centenary. Seven-time Cup Series champion Jimmie Johnson, 2009 Formula One World Champion Jenson Button, and 2010 24 Hours of Le Mans overall winner Mike Rockenfeller drove the car, while Johnson's longtime crew chief Chad Knaus was project manager. The car also bore number 24 in honor of Jeff Gordon.

In the Australian 2023 Supercars Championship, the sixth-generation Camaro ZL1 replaced the Holden Commodore ZB as the General Motors representative.

== Sales ==
Model year	Total sales
1967	220,906
1968	235,147
1969	243,085
1970	124,901
1971	114,630
1972	68,651
1973	96,571
1974	151,008
1975	145,770
1976	182,959

Model year	Total sales
1977	218,853
1978	272,631
1979	282,571
1980	152,005
1981	126,139
1982	189,747
1983	154,381
1984	261,591
1985	180,018
1986	192,219

Model year	Total sales
1987	137,760
1988	96,275
1989	110,739
1990	34,986
1991	100,838
1992	70,007
1993	39,103
1994	119,799
1995	122,738
1996	61,362

Model year	Total sales
1997	60,202
1998	54,026
1999	42,098
2000	45,461
2001	29,009
2002	41,776
Camaro ceases production until 2009

Calendar year	US sales
2010	81,299
2011	88,249
2012	84,391
2013	80,567
2014	86,297
2015	77,502
2016	72,705
2017	67,940
2018	50,963
2019	48,265

Calendar year	US sales
2020	29,775
2021	21,893
2022	24,652
2023	31,028
2024	5,859

== In popular culture ==
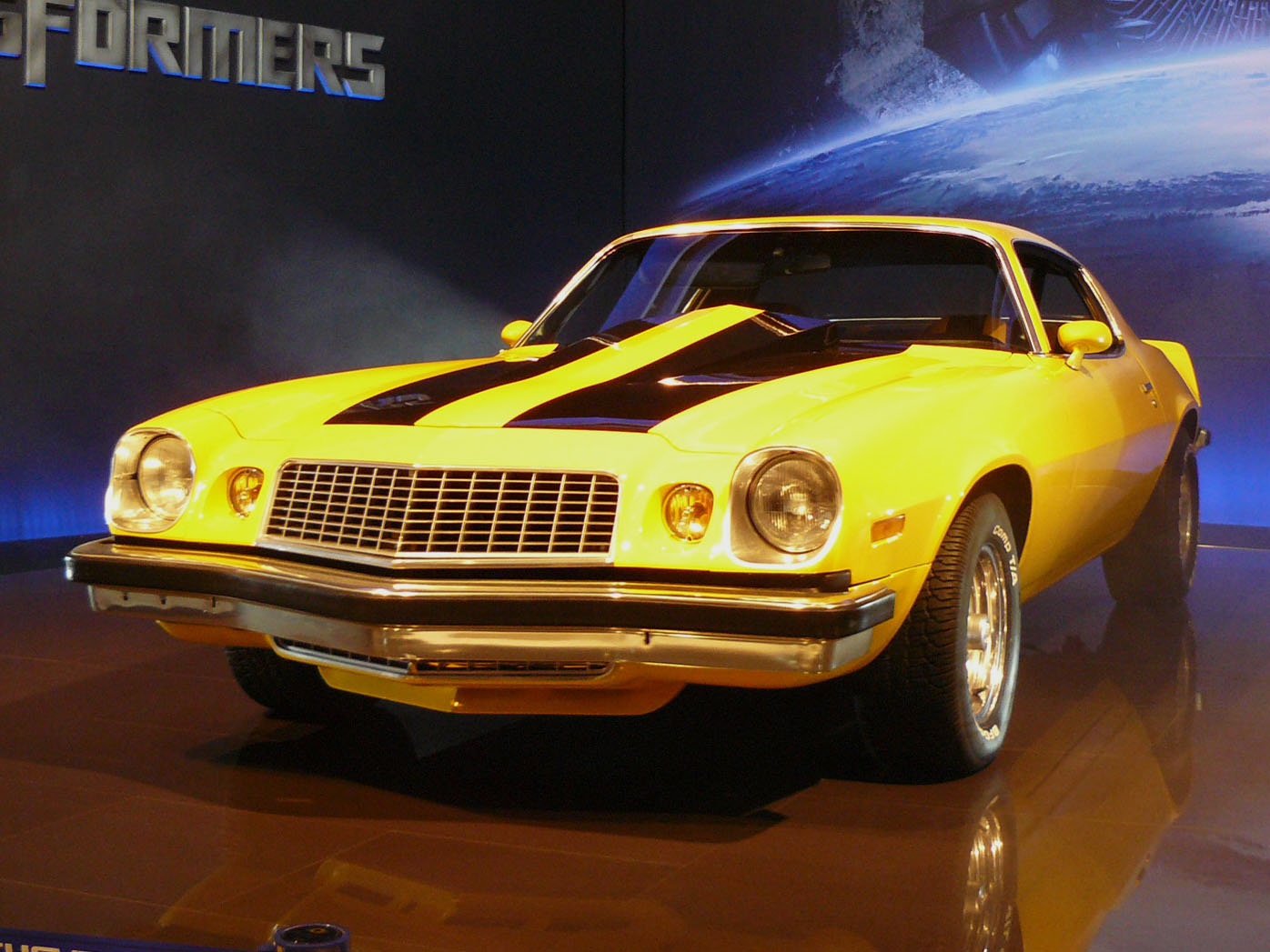
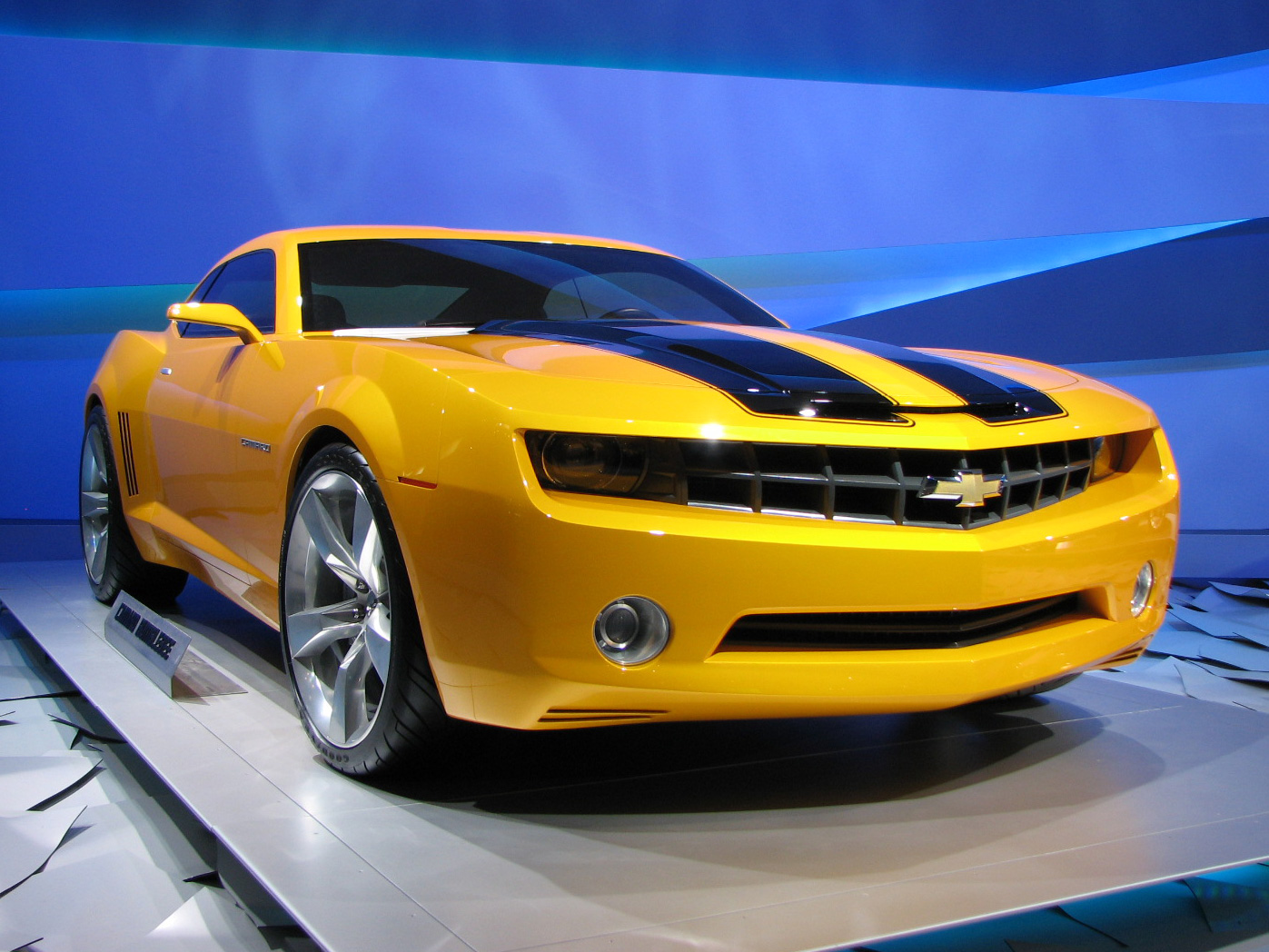
Bumblebee depicted as a 1976 and a 2010 Camaro

General Motors has made product placement or embedded marketing deals for the Chevrolet Camaro in numerous media.

The vehicle mode of the character Bumblebee in the 2007 film Transformers is first depicted as a 1976 Camaro, and later a fifth-generation concept variant. A modified fifth-generation Camaro reprises the role of Bumblebee in the sequels Transformers: Revenge of the Fallen (2009) and Transformers: Dark of the Moon (2011). Bumblebee takes on the form of a modified 1967 Camaro in Transformers: Age of Extinction (2014), and later a sixth-generation concept Camaro. He also returns as a modified 2016 Camaro in Transformers: The Last Knight (2017).
