= Storm: Frontline Nation =

2011 video game

- Developer(s): Colossai Studios
- Publisher(s): SimBin Studios
- Platform(s): Microsoft Windows
- Release: EU: June 10, 2011
- Genre(s): Turn-based strategy
- Mode(s): Single-player, multiplayer

Storm: Frontline Nation is a turn-based strategy video game developed by the Swedish developer Colossai Studios, and published by SimBin Studios. The game takes place in modern-day Europe and North Africa. Gameplay elements involve diplomacy, large-scale strategy and small-scale tactical warfare.

== Plot and gameplay ==
Storm: Frontline Nation is set in modern times where a nationalism and militarism dominate in Europe and North Africa. The game consists of two different gameplay levels, a strategic and a tactical. The strategic level is where the player manages production, diplomacy, research and coordination of military forces. The tactical level offers the player full control of its military units in a dynamically created hexagon-based battlefield. The players form alliances with important nations, and honour them as long as they serve their purpose as they conspire to game control of over 45 countries.

== Game info ==
- The world is your battlefield

A strategic world-map consisting of over 500 regions and 100 cities. The players play as one of 45 nations, ranging from US to Malta on maps covering all of Europe and North Africa.

- Strategic and tactical gameplay modes

The players play an entire campaign including both strategic and tactical game-play modes, or fight in combat focused skirmish.

- 20 customizable units

The players equip own units with a vast assortment of upgrades. They can upgrade own infantry with guided anti-tank missiles or suppress the enemy with mortar fire or both.

- Research and development - Weapons of mass destruction

The research system lets the players develop military technology upgrades for their units but also missile technology as well as their choice of weapons of mass destruction. They can attack own opponents with biological, chemical or nuclear weapons.

- Dynamic tactical battlefields

Dynamically created battlefields where weather and day/night-cycle effects the outcome.

- Advanced diplomacy system

An extensive political system with multi-nation negotiations. The players can form alliances or start wars, sign or refuse to sign treaties against weapons of mass destruction or use them to trade.

- Covert Operations

The players utilize spies and special forces to infiltrate, sabotage and manipulate the opposition.

== Development ==
The game was developed by Colossai Studios, a company founded in August 2005.
