= Volvo – The Game =

2009 video game

- Developer: SimBin Studios
- Publisher: SimBin Studios
- Platform: Microsoft Windows
- Release: May 26, 2009
- Genre: Sim racing
- Modes: Single-player, multiplayer

Volvo – The Game is a free racing simulation video game for Microsoft Windows, developed by SimBin Studios (later KW Studios) and released on May 26, 2009. The game was developed with the intention of showcasing the interior and exterior of Volvo cars, and as such was released free of charge.

When the game launched, Volvo organized an online competition, and the winner received a set of Pirelli tires.

== Gameplay ==
Volvo – The Game includes six cars from Volvo and two race tracks. Cars include the Volvo C30, S60, S40, 850 and the 240 Turbo Group A. The race tracks are the Gothenburg Eco Drive Arena and Autodrome Chaika.

The player can choose between racing with other opponents or racing alone against a record time for one lap.

The game was sponsored by Pirelli, who are the in-game tire manufacturer.

== Reception ==
The game was praised for its graphics and drivers' seat view, but criticized for only having two racing tracks.

In Russia, the game was published as a commercial product by the now-defunct publisher Akella. This fact, along with the game itself, was widely criticised by some Russian reviewers.
