= GTR 2 – FIA GT Racing Game =

2006 video game

- European cover art featuring the Maserati MC12, Ferrari 550 GTS, and Lamborghini Murciélago R-GT
- Developers: Blimey! Games; SimBin
- Publishers: Viva Media; 10tacle Studios
- Composer: Stephen Baysted
- Engine: ISImotor
- Platform: Windows
- Release: NA: September 14, 2006; EU: September 29, 2006; AU: October 6, 2006
- Genre: Racing simulation
- Modes: Single-player, multiplayer

GTR 2 – FIA GT Racing Game is a sports car racing simulator developed by Blimey! Games and SimBin Studios (later Sector3 Studios and KW Studios) and published by 10tacle Publishing in 2006 for the x86 PC. The game is a sequel to GTR. Since its release in September 2006, the game has received widespread acclaim.

== Gameplay ==
Not only the game simulates the official 2003 and 2004 FIA GT Championship racing series, but also open practice, race weekend, championships, time trials, endurance race events (including Spa 24 Hours) and driving school, with more than 140 high detailed cars from the GT and NGT classes as well as 34 different track-layouts. Extending the physics engine from GTR, it features realistic physics including steering command by sensitivity, dynamic lighting, damage modeling and 3 different game modes (Novice, Semi-Pro and Simulation). The multiplayer supports simultaneously up to 32 players.

Settings allow user to set up keyboard, mouse or joypad controls to simulate the steering control while a PC steering wheel is not available. These settings include:

- Sensitivity (time reaction from keypress)
- Speed sensitivity (steering inertia depending on vehicle speed)
- Lock (max steering angle at certain degrees)

One of the reasons GTR 2 has been so popular is the ability to create custom content for the game. This has led to a large community of players who create new vehicles and tracks to race with.

== Reception ==
Reception

Aggregate score
Aggregator	Score
Metacritic	90/100

Review scores
Publication	Score
IGN	9.2/10
GameSpot	9/10
Operation Sports	100/100
Eurogamer	9/10

- IGN's award for Best PC Racing Game of 2006.
- GameSpot's award for Best Driving Game of 2006 as well as the Best Game Nobody Played of 2006.
- GameSpy rated it the 9th best PC game of 2006.
- Metacritic's No. 3 Best PC Game of 2006.

The editors of Computer Games Magazine presented GTR 2 with their 2006 "Best Simulation" award. It was a runner-up for their list of the year's top 10 computer games. It also won PC Gamer US's 2006 "Best Racing Game" award.
