= KW Automotive =

German automobile parts manufacturing company

KW Automotive GmbH

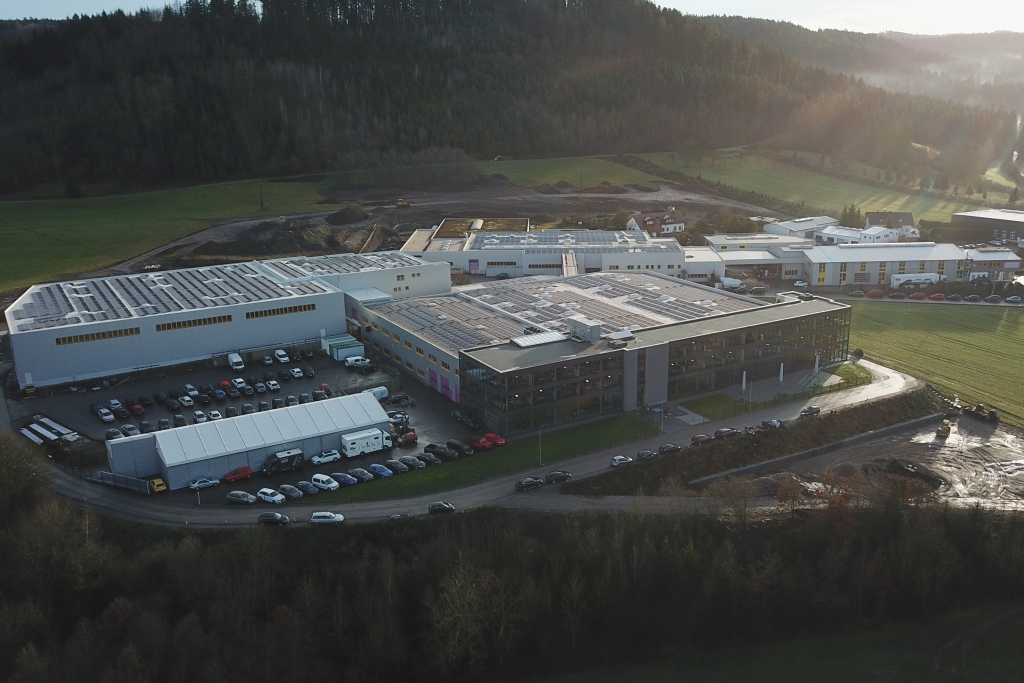
- Headquarters in Fichtenberg, Germany
- Type: Private (GmbH)
- Industry: Automobile parts manufacturing
- Founded: 1992
- Founders: Klaus Wohlfarth; Jürgen Wohlfarth
- Headquarters: Fichtenberg, Germany
- Products: Car suspension; Alloy wheels
- Number of employees: above 900
- Subsidiaries: BBS; KW Studios
- Website: kwautomotive.de

KW Automotive GmbH is a German company that primarily develops suspension systems for the automotive and motorsport industries.

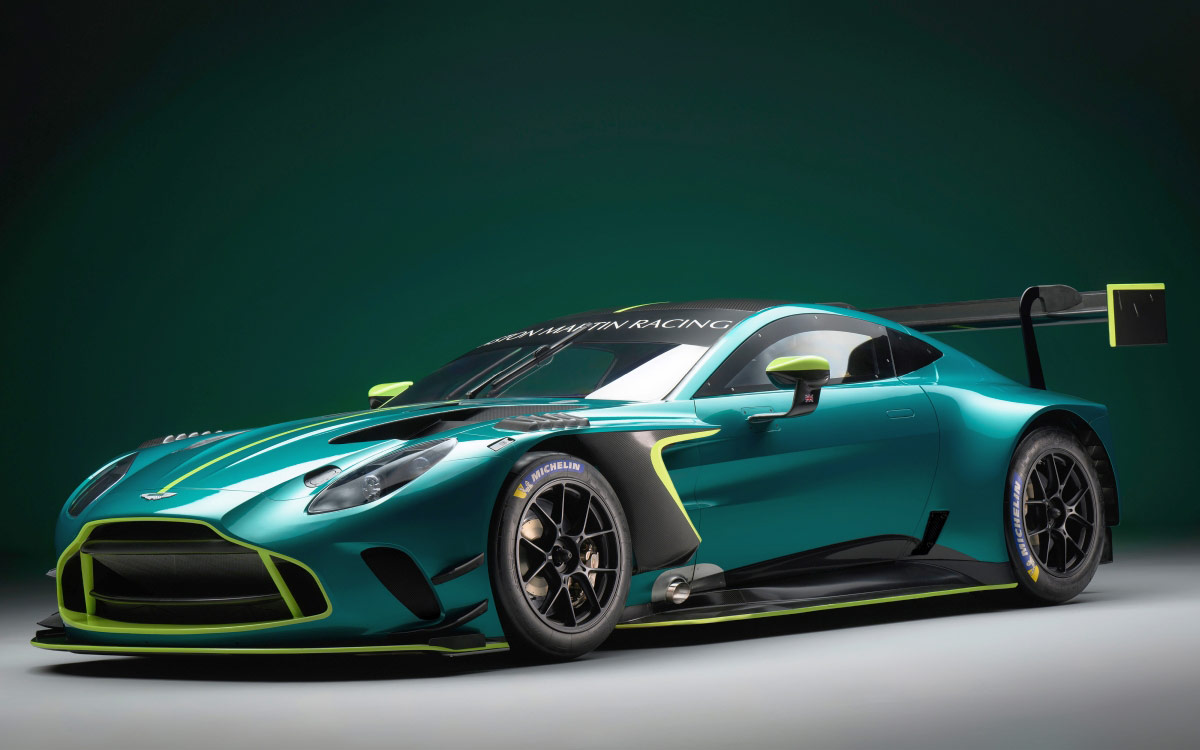
All Aston Martin Vantage AMR GT3 Evo and Aston Martin Vantage AMR GT4 Evo racecars are using KW Racing Shocks.

== History ==
The company was originally founded under the name KW Tuning in 1992 by Klaus Wohlfarth. The company originally sold and distributed car parts out of a 75 square meter retail building in Murrhardt.

In 1995, the first coilover suspension system by the company was introduced by Klaus and his brother Jürgen Wohlfarth. This system was approved by the TÜV and was presented at the Essen Motor Show. The company shifted their focus fully to suspension in 1996, under the new name KW Coilover Suspensions in a new 150 square metre facility. The company relocated to a new 1,000 square meter facility in Fichtenberg and was renamed to KW Automotive GmbH in 1998.

Aside from suspension, KW also entered other industries. From 1997 to 2001, KW wheels made alloy wheels for road use. In 2003, KW Automotive launched Lambo Style Doors (LSD) for aftermarket scissor doors.

In 2006, the signature yellow and purple color scheme was registered as an official trademark of KW across Europe. KW also developed the first aftermarket control system for factory air suspension in 2012, called Dynamic Level Control (DLC). In 2013, KW partnered with Polyphony Digital in the physics engine and engineering of vehicle dynamics in the Gran Turismo 6 racing simulation video game. In 2019, a new innovation in solid piston technology was invented and launched by KW suspensions.

== Company ==
KW Automotive employs approximately 1,202 employees worldwide with 13 locations. The company is headquartered in Fichtenberg, Germany, where the main R&D departments and production site are also located.

KW also has branch offices and subsidiaries worldwide: Reiger Suspension in Hengelo (Netherlands), BBS Automotive in Schiltach and Herbolzheim, KW Damping Technologies in Abadiño, Spain, KW automotive Schweiz in Rotkreuz, Switzerland, KW automotive UK in Kent, United Kingdom, Reiger Suspension in Molenenk, Netherlands, KW automotive NA in Clovis, California, BBS of America in Braselton, Georgia, KW suspensions China in Shanghai, China, KW automotive Taiwan in Taichung City, Taiwan, KW automotive Japan in Kyoto, Japan, and AL-KO Automotive Parts Manufacturing in Fenghua, China.

=== KW suspensions ===
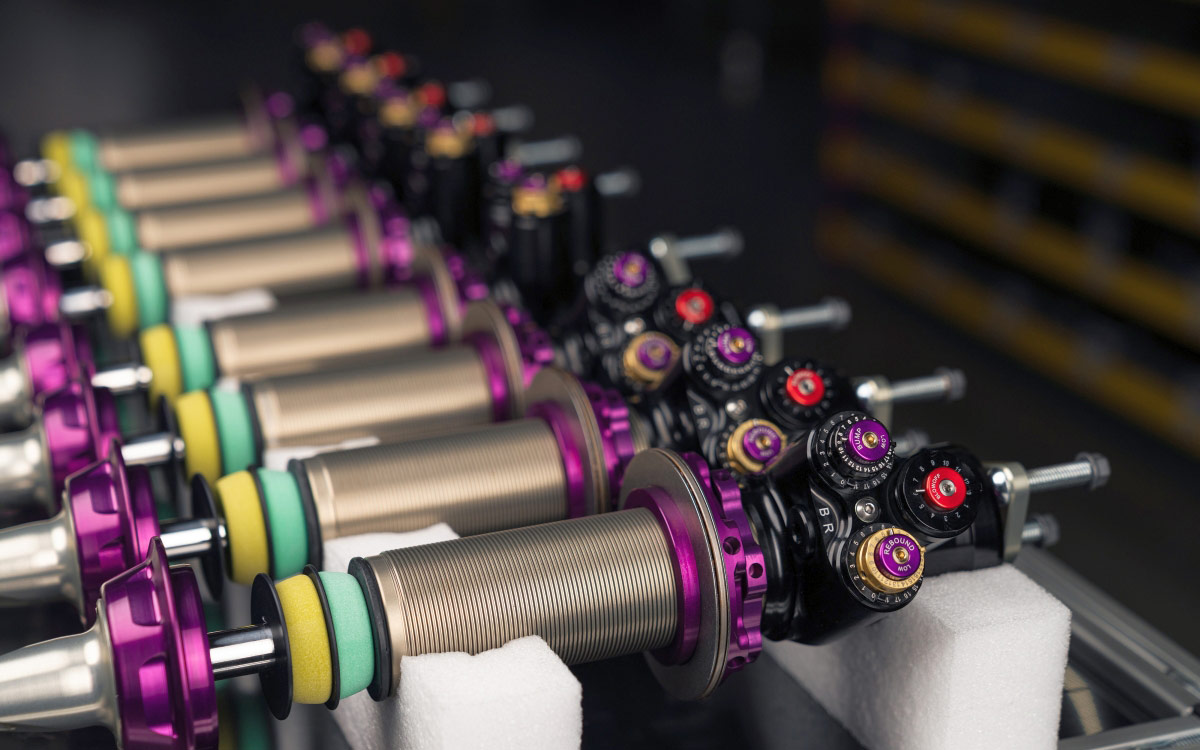
KW Racing Shocks

The company's flagship brand KW suspensions produces suspension for aftermarket, motorsport, and OEM applications. KW suspensions also produces other types of vehicle components, including steering dampers, chassis parts, and ride height control systems.

With over 26,000 individual applications in aftermarket suspension, KW suspensions has the largest aftermarket suspension portfolio in the industry.

Additionally, in original equipment applications, KW suspensions has developed numerous suspension systems for factory vehicles, such as the Mercedes SLK 55 AMG Black Series, CLK 63 AMG Black Series, SL 65 AMG Black Series, C 63 AMG Coupe Black Series, and G 500 4×4², as well as the Dodge Viper SRT-10 ACR-X and BMW M4 GTS. Similarly, the John Cooper Works Pro Suspension kit sold by Mini for the Mini Cooper as an official accessory is also manufactured by KW, and the Audi TT Clubsport Turbo Concept featured KW coilovers with HLS lift system.

KW suspensions has been influential in high-end suspension systems and components manufacture, with stainless-steel struts, height adjustable rear-axle springs, solid piston technology, hydraulic lift system (HLS), Dynamic Damping Control (DDC) plug-and-play systems for use with factory semi-active suspension, artificial intelligence for chassis control, and the utilization of an in-house advanced 7-post drive dynamics test stand, similar to those used in Formula One development, which is rare in the aftermarket car suspension industry.

Since 2023 KW Automotive has also been an official technology partner of Brabus and also technical partner of Lamborghini Squadra Corse, the motorsports department of Lamborghini. In 2024 Lamborghini SC63 will be running KW shock absorbers.

=== Other brands ===
KW Automotive owns a group of brands covering industries such as wheels, suspension, chassis components, and sim racing, with subsidiaries such as BBS Automotive, ST Suspensions, Reiger Suspension, Belltech, ap Sportfahrwerke, AL-KO, TrackTime, Ascher Racing, and RaceRoom (including the game's developer KW Studios).

== Motorsport ==
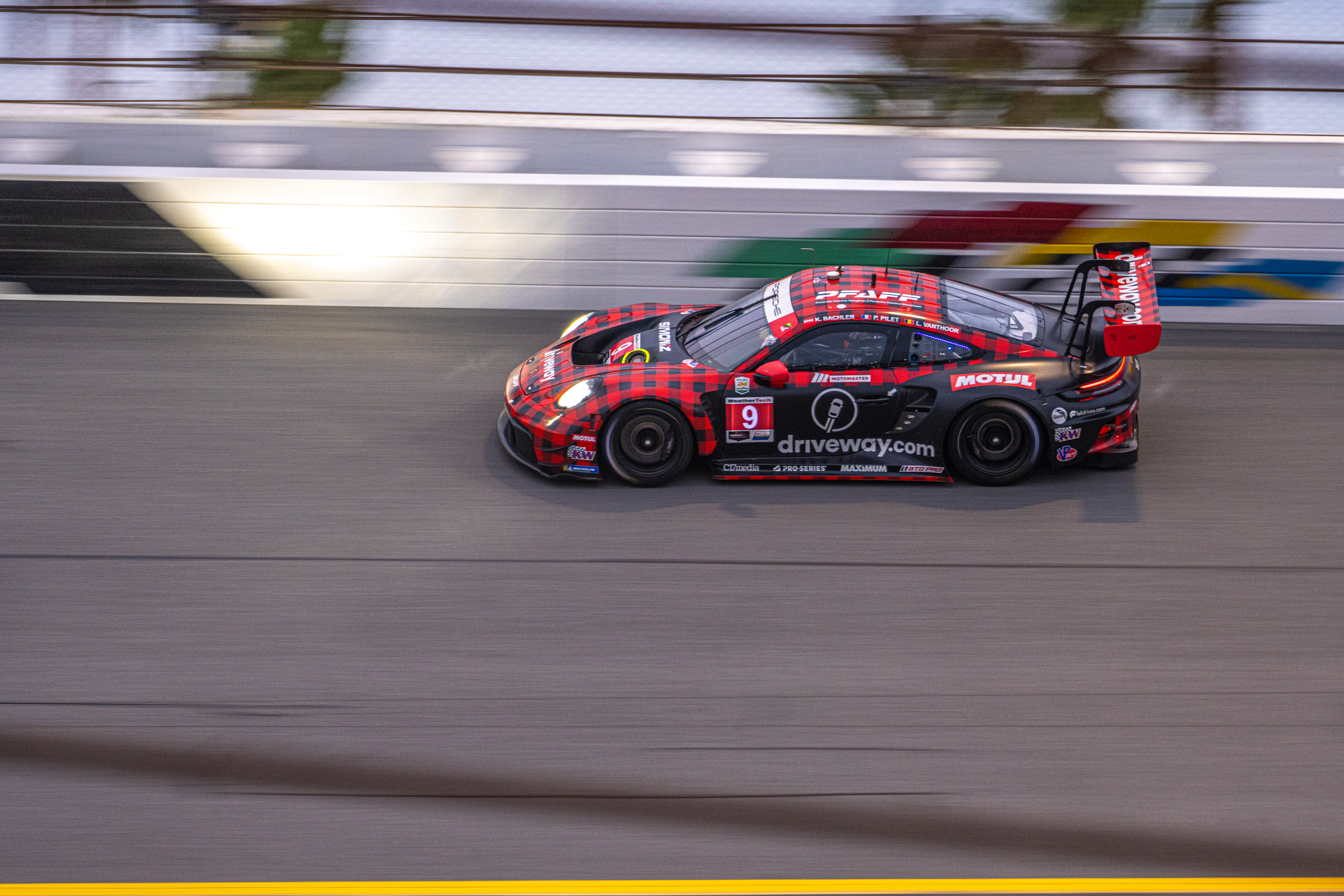
All Porsche 911 GT3 R racecars are using KW V6 Racing Shocks.

KW has a strong presence and great success in various forms of motorsport, especially in sports car racing.

KW Competition (KW RACING) suspensions are used in the FIA GT Championship, FIA World Touring Car Championship, ADAC GT Masters, ADAC GT4 Germany, ADAC TCR Germany, Blancpain GT Series Endurance Cup, Nürburgring Endurance Series, Nürburgring 24 Hours, GT World Challenge Asia, KW Bergcup, Formula Drift, DMV Challenge, Mercedes-Benz Challenge, and Bathurst 12 Hour.

KW suspensions are also a partner with BMW Motorsport, Manthey Racing, Falken Motorsport, Alpina, Teichmann Racing, Red Bull, Adrenaline Motorsports, Team 75 Bernhard, Rowe Racing and many more.

In Motorsports following cars are homologized with KW Racing Shocks: Aston Martin Vantage AMR GT3 Evo, Aston Martin Vantage AMR GT4 Evo, BMW M4 GT3, BMW M4 GT4, Lamborghini SC63, Mercedes-AMG GT4, Porsche 718 Cayman GT4 RS Clubsport, Porsche 911 GT3 R and Toyota GR Supra GT4.
