= Race Pro =

2009 video game

- European box featuring Aston Martin DBR9 and BMW 320si WTCC
- Developer: SimBin Studios
- Publisher: Atari
- Engine: Lizard
- Platform: Xbox 360
- Release: NA: February 17, 2009; EU: February 20, 2009
- Genre: Sim racing
- Modes: Single-player, multiplayer

Race Pro is a sim racing video game developed by SimBin Studios (later Sector3 Studios and KW Studios) and published by Atari exclusively for Xbox 360. The game is described as having "ultra realistic car models" with cars ranging in power from 200 hp (150 kW) to 1,000 hp (750 kW). The game uses the new Lizard game engine whereas the PC SimBin games used the Gmotor engine. This marks the first console game completed and released by SimBin.

Race Pro features cars and drivers from the 2007, 2006 and the original 1987 FIA World Touring Car Championship seasons, as well as the European F3000, Formula BMW, Mini Challenge and Caterham cup. The game also has three GT categories; on top of this it has racing Radicals and road cars which are the Audi R8, Koenigsegg CCX, Koenigsegg CCXR and Dodge Viper.

The drivers in the game are mostly real people, such as Tiff Needell, Tor Graves, and all the Touring car drivers of the 2007 FIA WTCC championship.

== Tracks ==
Tracks available in the game are those that were used in the 2007 WTCC and only the configuration used that year is available to drive for each circuit. They can all be raced in offline and online and in wet and dry conditions with up to sixteen entrants.

Autódromo Internacional de Curitiba, Circuit de Pau, Macau's Guia Circuit and Porto Circuit had not been playable before on seventh-generation consoles though it is possible to drive around Macau and sections of the Guia Circuit in Project Gotham Racing 4.

The other tracks are Circuit de Valencia, Brno Circuit, Brands Hatch, Motorsport Arena Oschersleben, Autodromo Nazionale Monza, Anderstorp Raceway, Circuit Park Zandvoort, Mazda Raceway Laguna Seca, Road America, and added through DLC packs, Imola Circuit, Circuito do Estoril, Okayama International Circuit, and Circuit de Spa-Francorchamps.

== Reception ==
Race Pro has received mixed ratings, with an average Metacritic score of 72%. The main criticisms were the grainy textures and large amounts of tearing, sparsely constructed tracks, and lack of in-game music. The game has an issue whereby it can sometimes lose players' saved career progress when going online. Wet weather is cosmetic only, so grip levels do not change.
