= Race – The Official WTCC Game =

2006 video game

Race - The WTCC Game
- Developer: SimBin Studios
- Publisher: SimBin Studios
- Engine: ISImotor
- Platform: Microsoft Windows
- Release: November 24, 2006
- Genre: Sim racing
- Modes: Single-player, multiplayer

Race is a racing simulator computer game based on the World Touring Car Championship released in November 2006. The game was developed and published by SimBin Studios (later Sector3 Studios and KW Studios), who had earlier produced critically acclaimed racing simulators like GTR and GT Legends, and distributed by Eidos in Europe and by Valve across their Steam network. The first expansion pack, Caterham Expansion was released in June 2007 featuring new cars and tracks.

The game features almost all drivers and all of the teams and tracks from the 2006 World Touring Car Championship season.

It was followed by a sequel in 2007, named Race 07.

== Reception ==
GameSpot reviewed the game stating: "Simbin follows up its GTR 2 success with another great PC racing sim, this time set in the World Touring Car series". They also awarded the game a score of 8.8 (Great).
