= GTR Evolution =

- Developer: SimBin Studios
- Publishers: Atari (Europe); Viva Media (US)
- Engine: ISImotor
- Platform: Windows
- Release: September 1, 2008
- Genre: Sim racing
- Modes: Single-player, multiplayer

GTR Evolution is an expansion pack to Race 07 developed by SimBin Studios (later Sector3 Studios and KW Studios), published by Atari in Europe and Viva Media in the United States. It was released worldwide for digital download on Steam on September 1, 2008. It is also available for purchase in many countries in a DVD boxed version.

== Gameplay ==
GTR Evolution adds several new cars, such as Audi R8 or Koenigsegg CCX, and tracks including variants of Nürburgring. Overall, the game has around 20 real-world tracks, along with 49 unique cars with 500 different variations separated in 12 classes. There is a newly added Arcade mode, which doesn't include qualifying races. The weather during the matches is dynamic, and can change from rain to sunlight. A steering wheel with force feedback is supported with a number of customization settings (button assignments, strength of the feedback, dead zone, etc.). Each of the vehicles has individual characteristics that is visible while driving. As well as a cockpit view, a helmet perspective is used in some cases like Formula 3000. After the installation, GTR Evolution can be played either as a standalone expansion or as a full game that contains Race 07.

== Reception ==
Reception

Review scores
Publication	Score
1Up.com	A−
4Players	85/100
Eurogamer	8/10
GamesRadar+	4/5
GameZone	9/10
Hardcore Gamer	4/5
IGN	8.5/10
PC Games (DE)	8/10
VideoGamer.com	8/10

On its release, GTR Evolution was met with "generally favorable" reviews from critics, with an aggregate score of 83% on Metacritic.
