= Race 07 =

2007 video game

Race 07 – Official WTCC Game
- Box art, showing an F3000 car, a BMW 320si WTCC and a Radical Sportscar.
- Developer: SimBin Studios
- Publisher: SimBin Studios
- Engine: ISImotor
- Platform: Windows
- Release: NA: 2 October 2007; EU: 12 October 2007
- Genre: Racing simulation
- Modes: Single-player, multiplayer

Race 07 is a racing simulator computer game from SimBin Studios (later Sector3 Studios and KW Studios). The game is the sequel to the 2006 title Race – The Official WTCC Game. Like the original Race, the title is officially licensed by the World Touring Car Championship (WTCC).

== Gameplay ==
Race 07 features more than 300 cars in nine different racing classes. Race 07 includes the full 2006 and 2007 seasons of the FIA World Touring Car Championships (FIA WTCC) as well as 8 more classes on 14 tracks from all over the world. The game features 32 real-life circuits.

Multiplayer is only available with installation of the Steam client and registration for an account with Steam.

== Release ==
In September 2007, Atari's UK operations signed a distribution deal with SimBin for exclusive rights to the title in the United Kingdom.

== Reception ==
Reception

Aggregate scores
Aggregator	Score
GameRankings	82%
Metacritic	83%

Review scores
Publication	Score
1Up.com	80%
Edge	70%
Eurogamer	80%
GameSpot	80%
PC Gamer (UK)	83%
PC Zone	79%

The game was moderately-well received by critics. IGN stated that the game was "not as likely to win over a casual racer, because little was done to cultivate new hardcore sim racing fans here". PC Format, Eurogamer, Boomtown and PTGamers all agreed that "visuals aren't the main attraction of the game", while PC Zone criticized the AI and crash damage. GameShark praised the game's longevity.

== Expansion packs ==
Race 07 spawned nine expansion packs: GTR Evolution, STCC – The Game, Race On, Formula Raceroom (free of charge), STCC – The Game 2, GT Power, WTCC 2010, RETRO and Race Injection.

Formula Raceroom is a free add-on pack to RACE 07 developed by SimBin and adds a Formula One style car and Hockenheimring circuit to the original game. It was released on March 18, 2011.

STCC – The Game is an expansion pack that features the 2008 Swedish Touring Car Championship season and its support series, the Camaro Cup. It was released on October 22, 2008.

=== Race On ===
- Developer: SimBin Studios
- Publisher: bitComposer Games
- Platform: Microsoft Windows
- Release: October 16, 2009
- Genre: Racing simulator

Race On is an expansion pack to RACE 07 developed by SimBin Studios (later Sector3 Studios and KW Studios) and adds the 2008 World Touring Car Championship season, the International Formula Master series and some American muscle cars in both road and race-tuned versions to RACE 07. It was released internationally on October 16, 2009. It is available as a stand-alone game including Race 07 as well as its previous expansion pack STCC - The Game (which was only released as a boxed copy in Scandinavia) and as an add-on pack to those who already have Race 07 and/or STCC - The Game.

==== Reception ====
Race On received mixed reviews, scoring a Metacritic average of 73%.

IT Reviews commented that "Race On is a good value for money package, with a colossal number of cars and tracks on offer if you've not got the original game", but also added that for those who already own Race 07, all the players get is "new muscle cars to play around with, and the Swedish championship", which makes it a "slightly less compelling purchase for them".

PC Gamer magazine in the UK agreed broadly with this: "It's not bad value if you're new to Race 07, but is perhaps a raw deal for those who own the base game".
