= RaceRoom =

2013 sim racing video game

RaceRoom Racing Experience
- Developer: KW Studios
- Publisher: RaceRoom Entertainment AG
- Producers: Jean-François Chardon; Sonat Dennis Öztürk
- Designers: Karsten Borchers; Marko Hartikainen; Anthony Monteil
- Programmers: Nikita Dyomin; Robert Holm; Viktor Öfjäll
- Engine: isiMotor 2
- Platform: Microsoft Windows
- Release: 12 February 2013
- Genre: Sim racing
- Modes: Single-player, multiplayer

RaceRoom Racing Experience (also referred to simply as RaceRoom) is a freemium sim racing video game developed by KW Studios and published by RaceRoom Entertainment AG in 2013. The game provides a selection of free-to-play race cars and tracks to drive in multiplayer and single player games modes. Sponsored competitions and other free-to-play events allow users to use premium game content at no cost.

== Gameplay ==
RaceRoom offers many different game modes such as Multiplayer Races, Custom Championships, Single Races against AI, Practice, Leaderboard Challenges and Online Competitions. The simulation also includes an online portal that keeps track of player statistics and leaderboard entries that serve as a platform for the players' activities. The game aims to provide an authentic racing experience through detailed car and track models as well as realistic car behaviour and sounds. RaceRoom also supports virtual reality through Valve Index, HTC Vive, Oculus Rift or Windows Mixed Reality.

The game includes more than 250 fully licensed cars available from 49 manufacturers, spanning from touring cars, sports cars, open-wheel cars, and historic classes. A total of 69 venues, including layouts, are available.

== Development ==
According to CEO Chris Speed, RaceRoom was initially created and maintained by 10 to 11 people. The game licensed Image Space Incorporated's isiMotor 2 game engine, and utilized a new proprietary RendR graphics engine, capable of rendering different times of day, post-processing effects, and support for rain, although RaceRoom does not currently feature rain. The game also features a custom audio engine. The game entered closed beta in late 2012, transitioning to open beta a few months later.

Since its release, RaceRoom has been updated regularly with new features and content and has received significant improvements in all departments. In a March 2016 interview with Inside Sim Racing, producer Jean-François Chardon stated that the original code remaining from the base isiMotor 2 engine in RaceRoom is "less than 20 percent". RaceRoom continues to run on RendR; a move to Unreal Engine 4 was previously planned, with a development image of RaceRoom running the engine teased by Speed in the studio's forums, although this never materialized. The game received a major graphics overhaul on September 2024, featuring improved rendering, performance optimizations, and new features such as dynamic cloud coverage. Physics-based rendering was implemented on June 2025. An updated HUD was introduced on July 2026. RaceRoom's October 2026 update, named "Historic Update 2026", saw a number of improvements to the game alongside new car and track content, including a revamped backend database, refreshed user interface, updated force feedback, adjustments to the tire contact model, and native support for OpenXR.

KW Studios has previously worked with real racing drivers to gain feedback and fettle the simulation aspects of the game such as vehicle physics and tyre modelling, including Bruno Spengler, Daniel Juncadella, Kelvin van der Linde, and Mikaela Åhlin-Kottulinsky. Telemetry data derived from global partners such as the Deutsche Tourenwagen Masters, World Touring Car Championship, ADAC GT Masters, and the studio's parent company KW Automotive is also used to further develop the physics model of the cars.

== Competitions ==
The DTM Esports booth at the 2024 Essen Motor Show running RaceRoom.

RaceRoom hosts the official DTM Esports Championship annually, featuring a €75,000 prize pool.

== Reception ==
Eurogamer reviewed RaceRoom in 2014 and called it "the best racing game you've never heard of".

== See also ==
- Sim racing
- List of simulation video games
- List of driving and racing video games
