= KW Studios =

Swedish video game company

KW Studios Ltd.
- Formerly: SimBin Studios (2003–2014); Sector3 Studios (2014–2022)
- Company type: Subsidiary
- Industry: Video games
- Founded: June 2003
- Headquarters: Lidköping, Sweden
- Number of locations: 1
- Key people: Chris Speed (CEO)
- Number of employees: 8
- Parent: KW Automotive
- Website: www.kw-studios.com

KW Studios Ltd. (formerly SimBin Studios and Sector3 Studios) is a Swedish video game developer and publisher. It was founded in 2003, and it develops racing simulators for Windows PC, with its headquarters in Lidköping, Sweden. The company originally started as a modding team for the Image Space Incorporated game F1 2002, releasing a mod based on the 2002 season of the FIA GT championship, essentially the precursor to its first commercial game.

The company has released GTR - FIA GT Racing Game, GT Legends, and a sequel to GTR Racing called GTR - FIA GT Racing Game 2, all published by 10tacle as well as RACE - The Official WTCC Game published by Eidos Interactive and RACE 07 - The Official WTCC Game which was the first SimBin game to include Formula cars. RACE 07 has gone on to have nine expansion packs released for it: GTR Evolution, STCC - The Game, Race On, Formula Raceroom, STCC The Game 2, GT Power Expansion, WTCC 2010, Retro Expansion, and Race Injection. Although the company mainly focuses on racing simulators for Windows, Race Pro was developed for the Xbox 360 console, published by Atari and released in February 2009. In May 2009 SimBin released Volvo – The Game as a freeware for Windows. In 2013, SimBin released RaceRoom Racing Experience, a new free-to-play game that connects fans of racing around a game, motorsports portal and online store.

By September 2014, SimBin Studios had officially changed their name to Sector3 Studios, as part of a company restructuring. The name was changed primarily because the former was contractually tied to the location, and the team wanted to move to a more populous area. By January 2022, German automotive parts manufacturer KW Automotive had quietly acquired Sector3 Studios and renamed it to KW Studios.

== Games developed ==
Title	Release date	Genre	Platform	Remarks
GTR – FIA GT Racing Game	March 11, 2005	Sim racing	Windows	
GT Legends	October 15, 2005	Sim racing	Windows	
GTR 2 – FIA GT Racing Game	September 29, 2006	Sim racing	Windows	
Race – The Official WTCC Game	November 24, 2006	Sim racing	Windows	
Race 07 – The Official WTCC Game	October 12, 2007	Sim racing	Windows	
Race Pro	February 17, 2009	Sim racing	Xbox 360	
Volvo – The Game	May 26, 2009	Sim racing	Windows	
RaceRoom: The Game	December 1, 2010	Sim racing	Windows	
RaceRoom: The Game 2	November 1, 2011	Sim racing	Windows	
RaceRoom Racing Experience	February 12, 2013	Sim racing	Windows	
DTM Experience	December 5, 2013	Sim racing	Windows	
GTR 3	Cancelled	Sim racing		Co-developed with SimBin UK.

== Games published ==
Title	Release date	Genre	Platform
Storm: Frontline Nation	June 10, 2011	Turn-based strategy	Windows
