= GT Legends =

2005 video game

- European cover art
- Developer: SimBin Studios
- Publisher: 10tacle Publishing
- Engine: ISImotor
- Platform: Windows
- Release: GER: October 6, 2005; UK: November 4, 2005; NA: January 23, 2006
- Genre: Sim racing
- Modes: Single-player, multiplayer

GT Legends is a sports car racing simulator for the Windows developed by SimBin Studios (later Sector3 Studios an KW Studios) and published by 10tacle Publishing. It is based on the 2005 FIA Historic Racing Championships for GTC and TC cars of the 1960s and 1970s. This is a modern-day championship for historic cars, and so the circuit designs in GT Legends are those of the modern era, contrasting with games such as Grand Prix Legends which are actually set in historic times.

GT Legends has the same graphics engine as rFactor (developed by Image Space Incorporated), a similar physics engine but different multiplayer code.

== Gameplay ==
The game includes 25 circuits, including Donington Park, Mondello Park and Monza. The multiplayer supports up to 15 players.

== Reception ==
Reception

Aggregate score
Aggregator	Score
Metacritic	84/100

Review scores
Publication	Score
Eurogamer	8/10
GameSpot	8.5/10
GameZone	8.4/10

GT Legends received "generally favorable" reviews, according to review aggregator Metacritic.

Eurogamer praised the game's graphics, setting, handling, car selection, options, and difficulty. GameSpot praised the car models, physics modeling, sophisticated audio, options, and vintage cars, while criticizing some technical issues, lack of rain races, the requirement of high-end computing power, progression, and reduced damage.
