= Gran Turismo (2009 video game) =

2009 sim racing video game

- North American cover art featuring the Chevrolet Corvette ZR1
- Developer: Polyphony Digital
- Publisher: Sony Computer Entertainment
- Designer: Kazunori Yamauchi
- Composer: Masahiro Andoh
- Series: Gran Turismo
- Platform: PlayStation Portable
- Release: October 1, 2009
- Genre: Sim racing
- Modes: Single-player, multiplayer

Gran Turismo (Note: Japanese: グランツーリスモ, Hepburn: Guran Tsūrisumo) is a 2009 sim racing video game by Polyphony Digital and published by Sony Computer Entertainment for the PlayStation Portable. The game was announced at Sony's E3 press conference on May 11, 2004, alongside the original PSP. Following five years of delays and speculation, during which it was variously known as Gran Turismo Portable, Gran Turismo 4 Mobile, Gran Turismo 5 Mobile and Gran Turismo 4.5, it made a reappearance at E3 on June 2, 2009, in playable form. It was released on October 1, 2009, as one of the launch titles for the new PSP Go. As of September 2017, Gran Turismo has sold 4.67 million units, making it one of the best-selling PlayStation Portable games. On June 1, 2010, the game was re-released as part of Sony's Greatest Hits budget line of video games.

== Gameplay ==
Toyota Supras from the JGTC racing league compete on High Speed Ring.

The game is centered on an open-ended design. The single player menu presents players with three variables: mode (Time Trial, Single Race, and Drift Trial), car, and track selection. Rewards such as credits and cars earned based on the difficulty, performance and number of laps they have chosen. Players can select from one to 99 laps. Gran Turismo is centered on completing driving missions in order to advance in the game, unlike Gran Turismo 4's open-ended map. The game uses a new trading system to allow players to acquire cars.

There are 45 tracks (including layout variations) plus the added bonus of reverse on most tracks, which takes the track number to 72. For the first time in the series, the game features the use of custom soundtracks that enables players to play their own songs while racing, but this option must first be unlocked by completing section B or C of the Driving Challenges. The music tracks can be used for offline or online races. There are some hidden tracks which are removed prior to release (notably Smokey Mountain and Tahiti Circuit from Gran Turismo 3: A-Spec - both which initially debuted in Gran Turismo 2 with some differences). These tracks are only accessible on systems with modified firmware and running Gameshark-like programs, and some issues have been reported with them. During an interview at E3, it was revealed that tracks featured in the game (such as Valencia Ricardo Tormo) are directly sourced from Gran Turismo 4 and Tourist Trophy, while the game's physics engine is based on Gran Turismo 5 Prologue.

Gran Turismo features 833 vehicles, each modeled accurately and statistics derived from their real life counterparts. The exotic car manufacturer Ferrari is featured, and for the first time in the main Gran Turismo series, Lamborghini, Bugatti and various other cars were introduced and fully licensed. There is no damage model in the game. Players begin with a low-powered car, but can upgrade to better cars as they progress through the game. The dealerships available change after every other race, so players will not always be able to buy what they are looking for.

Four cars are featured in a race at any one time, the player car and three opponents (with the AI having improvements since Gran Turismo 4). This is down from the total of six cars in previous games in the series, but the player can race against three cars also in the rally races, which was never possible in every previous game, considering that in previous games the player can race only against one car in a rally race. Multiplayer is available for up to four players via local wireless play across a handful of modes, with various options that allow players of all skill types to play together. There is no online play, although it supports Ad hoc Party for PlayStation Portable, nor are there any online leaderboards for time trial times or the ability to share ghost laps with other players. Gran Turismo also allows online play through the free downloadable PlayStation 3 (PS3) application Ad hoc Party for PlayStation Portable (PSP). It was initially announced that downloadable content (DLC) would not be released for Gran Turismo, although seven cars, the 2003 Mercedes-Benz SLR McLaren, 2009 Nissan GT-R SpecV, 2008 Citroen GT, 2009 Bugatti Veyron 16.4, 2009 Chevrolet Corvette ZR1, 1974 Lamborghini Countach LP400 and the 2002 Ferrari Enzo, were made available for download via the PlayStation Store.

In the game also the Ferrari F2007 has been added, in two different colors, which will go to compose, with the Formula GT, the second F1 car available in the game. Parts of the game are narrated by TV personality and car enthusiast Jay Leno.

The controls are unusual because the PSP does not have pressure sensitive buttons, meaning the player cannot control the degree of acceleration or braking. Creator Kazunori Yamanuchi was against the idea of using external controllers via PSP Plus for more accurate control, telling an interviewer "if you want to play on Gran Turismo using a PS3 controller, you will have to play on Gran Turismo 5".

== Development and marketing ==
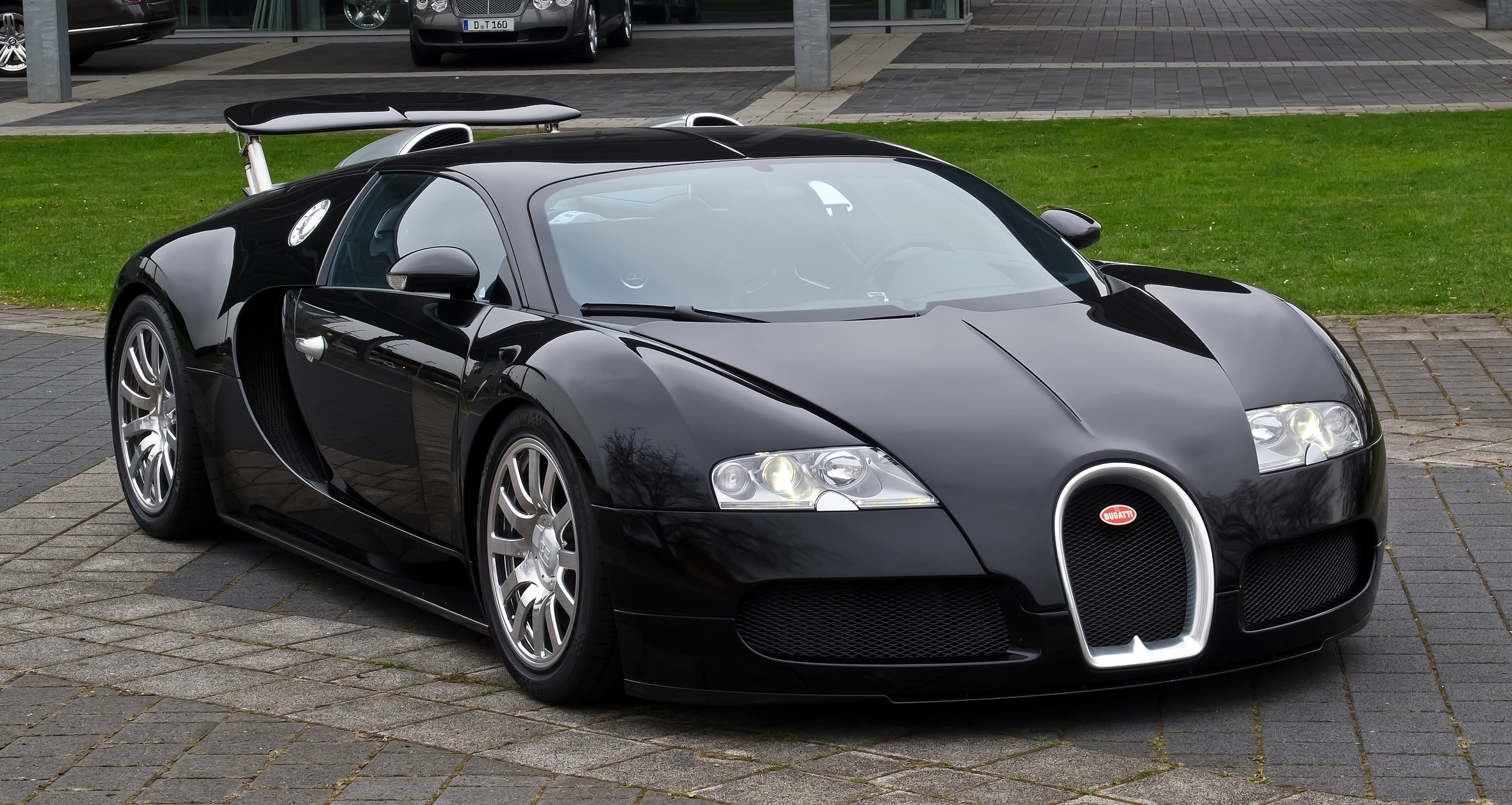
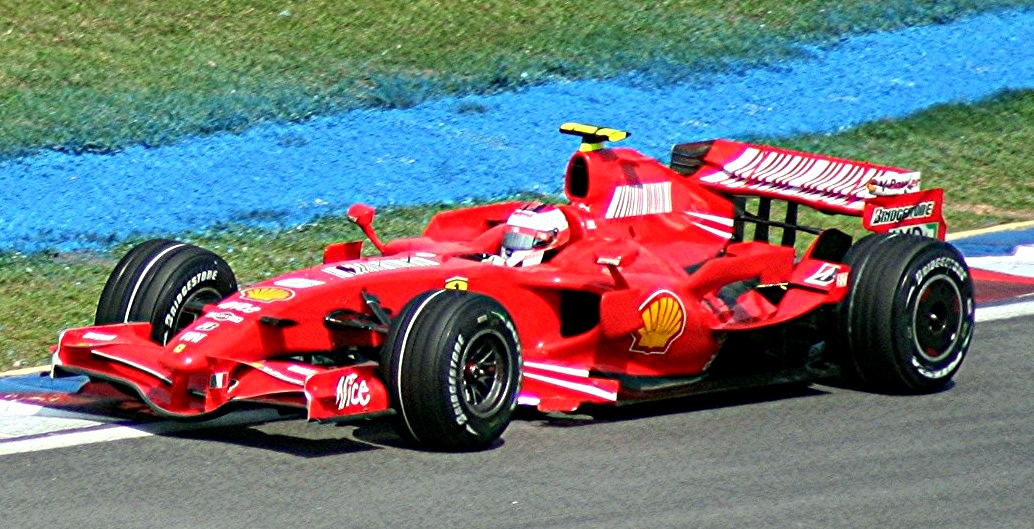
The Bugatti Veyron and Ferrari F2007 are two vehicles featured in the game.

Fitting a full-scale Gran Turismo on the PSP platform was a challenge for Polyphony Digital. Series director Kazunori Yamauchi stated that the main problem was trying to fit the game in such a small memory space. Regardless, Gran Turismo runs at 60 frames per second and takes up only 1GB of storage.

Originally titled Gran Turismo 4 Mobile, the game was initially to have a release date sometime in April 2005 — however, it was notably absent from the 2004 Tokyo Game Show and then from E3 2005, a year after it was first announced. At the end of 2005, Sony Computer Entertainment announced that the game would be pushed back to sometime in 2006. Despite no news for most of 2006, Kazunori Yamauchi assured audiences that Gran Turismo for the PSP was still in development and on its way. Development was slowed to focus priorities on Gran Turismo 4 on the PlayStation 2 and Gran Turismo 5 on the PlayStation 3. Polyphony president Kazunori Yamauchi wanted the game to be a "fully specced" title, not merely "a subset to the series". Yamauchi also cited difficulty in designing the game for the PSP Go. As the Go features a relocated analog nub, the developers had to make adjustments to ensure the experience felt the same as with a standard PSP. Polyphony Digital's busy schedule with releases of Gran Turismo 4, Tourist Trophy, Gran Turismo HD, and Gran Turismo 5 Prologue also slowed Gran Turismo's development. The company also refused to outsource the game to another developer, describing that move as "unthinkable". Several other titles were considered, including Gran Turismo 4 Mobile and Gran Turismo 5 Portable. The title Gran Turismo Spyder was also considered, but was dropped as the developers felt that both it and the Gran Turismo 4 Mobile title did not represent a "fully-specced Gran Turismo".

In April 2008, Yamauchi stated that developing Gran Turismo 5 on the PlayStation 3 "took much more time and effort and this was because loads of new stylish cars have started to come out so it took longer to develop than we had first imagined", and that it was unlikely the PSP version would be released by the end of 2008. A version of Gran Turismo for the PSP was shown during Sony's E3 2009 keynote on June 2, 2009. Called simply Gran Turismo, its October 1, 2009 release date coincides with the launch of the PSP Go, which was announced at the same conference.

As part of its promotion of the game, Sony had a crane built at Gamescom in Cologne, Germany that would hang the journalists 15 meters above the ground to try out the game. Sony Canada has also been known to advertise the game on various billboards in the Toronto, Ontario region. Sony also ran a TV commercial campaign, with one advertisement shot at Mazda Raceway Laguna Seca. It featured a real Chevrolet Corvette ZR1 competing against a person playing Gran Turismo in the passenger seat. The real Corvette was driven by Rhys Millen while Tanner Foust drove the same car in the game. Gran Turismo is available as both a Universal Media Disc (UMD) at retail and as a digital download from the PlayStation Store. Users are able to install part of Gran Turismo on their memory stick. The install takes about 1GB of space. The UMD still needs to be in the PSP's UMD drive to run the game. The loading times of the game are drastically reduced after installing.

== Reception ==
Reception

Aggregate score
Aggregator	Score
Metacritic	74/100

Review scores
Publication	Score
1Up.com	B
Eurogamer	7/10
Game Informer	7/10
GamePro	3/5
GameRevolution	C+
GameSpot	7.5/10
GameSpy	4/5
GameTrailers	7.7/10
IGN	6.8/10
VideoGamer.com	9/10

Gran Turismo received "mixed or average" reviews, according to review aggregator website Metacritic. It was praised for still featuring the same realistically handling cars for the console games (which has improved from the GT4 version) as well as having a large number of cars, including AI improvements, but it was criticized for not having a traditional career mode nor the ability to upgrade cars.

The game was a commercial success. In its first year it had sold 2.22 million copies worldwide. On June 1, 2010, the game was re-released as part of Sony's Greatest Hits budget line of video games. As of September 2017, Gran Turismo had sold 4.67 million units worldwide, making it one of the best-selling PSP games.
