= Gran Turismo 3: A-Spec =

2001 sim racing video game

- European cover art, featuring the headlight of a 996 Porsche 911 GT3
- Developer: Polyphony Digital
- Publisher: Sony Computer Entertainment
- Producer: Kazunori Yamauchi
- Designers: Yuichi Matsumoto; Masaaki Goto
- Composers: Isamu Ohira; Daiki Kasho
- Series: Gran Turismo
- Platform: PlayStation 2
- Release: JP: April 28, 2001; NA: July 10, 2001; EU: July 20, 2001
- Genre: Sim racing
- Modes: Single-player, multiplayer

Gran Turismo 3: A-Spec is a 2001 sim racing video game developed by Polyphony Digital and published by Sony Computer Entertainment for the PlayStation 2. It is the third installment in the Gran Turismo series. During its demonstration at E3 2000 and E3 2001, the game was known under the working title Gran Turismo 2000.

With previous titles being developed for the original PlayStation, Gran Turismo 3 marked the series' first foray into the sixth generation of video game consoles. Originally slated for a 2000 release as a launch title for the PlayStation 2, the game's development primarily focused on taking advantage of the console's newfound hardware capabilities. While compromising on the number of available vehicles (180, as opposed to 650 in Gran Turismo 2), the game was a significant leap forward in terms of graphics, physics, sound design, car modelling, opponent AI, environments and technical performance.

Like its predecessors, the game released to critical acclaim and was a commercial success. It went on to become the best-selling game in the series to date, the best-selling PlayStation 2 exclusive, and the second best-selling PlayStation 2 game (behind only Grand Theft Auto: San Andreas), having sold over 14.8 million copies since release. It is considered one of the greatest video games ever made. A landmark shift to the next generation of consoles, it is often cited as a turning point for the series and the sim racing genre as a whole. Its successor, Gran Turismo 4, was released in December 2004.

== Gameplay ==
The objective of the game is to win all the provided races, championships, complete license tests and achieve 100% game completion. Every 25% of the game completed results in the player being awarded a car as a special prize. For GT3, the Gran Turismo Mode (Simulation Mode in the North American version) has a reorganized layout, with a more structured and progressive arrangement of races and challenges. Races vary from short beginner events to multi-hour endurance races and also rallying events against an opponent. In addition to these modes, car shops are now organized by country and then by manufacturer.

The Arcade Mode is reorganized in "stages"; these stages are made up of 5 or 6 tracks pooled from all available tracks in the game, including both road and rally races. To get to the next stage, all tracks on a stage must be completed on Easy difficulty or higher. By beating the stage on Normal or Difficult, additional cars are unlocked as well for play in any mode of Arcade Mode (including two-player battle and time trial).

GT3 features 19 race courses, 14 of which have reverse variants and 4 of which are dirt tracks. Most of these circuits are at fictional locations, but California's Laguna Seca Raceway and Côte d’Azur (which is heavily based on the Monaco Grand Prix circuit) are not.

Other changes include the omission of the ability to "race modify" or add downforce to production cars, removal of suspension damage, and the absence of torque limits for races. Race modifications would make a return in 2010's Gran Turismo 5 for the PlayStation 3, but were again omitted in the following game.

New to the franchise, GT3 also contained unlicensed versions of six actual Formula One cars, labelled as F686/M, F687/S, F688/S, F090/S, F094/H and F094/S (in the Japanese and American versions) that the player could win from endurance races. In the Japanese and American versions, the name of each car denotes various pieces of information (such as the amount of cylinders in the engine, the year the chassis was raced, and its driver, respectively). For example, the aforementioned F094/S was the 10-cylinder, 1994-season car driven by Ayrton Senna, whereas the F686/M represented the 6-cylinder, 1986-season car driven by Nigel Mansell. In the PAL release, however, there were only two F1 cars, not obviously based on any real-life counterparts and instead labelled as Polyphony 001 and 002 respectively.

GT3 also marks informal appearances of automakers Lamborghini and Porsche. A racing JGTC Lamborghini Diablo was featured in the NTSC-J version (and in the NTSC-U version's game code, only accessible with a cheat device), and a Porsche 911 GT3 can be found in the game code (though it cannot be obtained normally in any version of the game, and also requires the use of a cheat device). Both cars, together with two hidden Lancia Stratoses (road and rally versions), however, are completely absent in PAL version. Lamborghini would make its first official appearance in 2009's Gran Turismo for PlayStation Portable, while Porsche made its first official appearance in Gran Turismo Sport for the PlayStation 4.

== Development and release ==
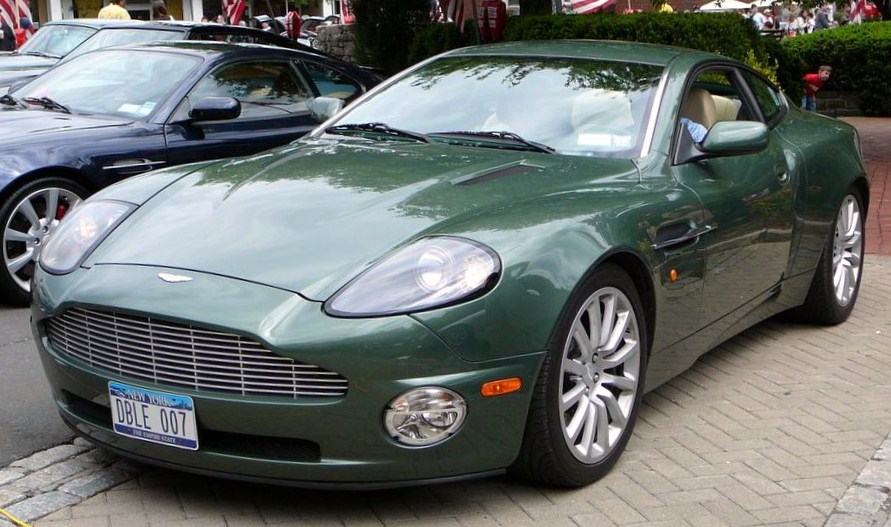
The Aston Martin Vanquish was one of the new cars in the game.

The game was developed by Kazunori Yamauchi, who had developed the first two games. Development on the game began around January 1999, when its predecessor Gran Turismo 2 was still in development. Yamauchi collaborated with computer and game peripheral maker Logitech for the game, which resulted in the GT Force steering wheel. The wheel features force feedback and was designed specifically for GT3.

A demo copy of the game under the working title was issued in the PlayStation Festival 2000, allowing players to drive a Mitsubishi Lancer Evolution V in the Seattle Circuit for 120 seconds. The game was more or less a beta version of GT3 named Gran Turismo 2000, that was renamed to GT3 A-Spec due to the fact that the game was taking longer to make than planned.

Compared to Gran Turismo 2, the graphics are greatly improved thanks to the PlayStation 2's hardware, but the number of cars has been drastically reduced in this game due to large work onto graphics, cars structure, detailed statistics of all the cars and the game's release being early in the PlayStation 2's lifespan. About 180 cars are featured in this game, rather than 650 in GT2.

A giveaway launched at the release of the game included various prizes in North America; for example, there was a day at the Skip Barber Racing School, car payments for a month and Gran Turismo themed shirt and hat up for giveaway.

=== Gran Turismo Concept ===
Due to its critically acclaimed reception, a short version, Gran Turismo Concept, was released in Japan and various parts of the world except North America in 2001 and 2002. It included new models unveiled during famous Asian and European Motor Shows. Upon completing the game, the player was given a save game with all licenses completed and 10,000,000 credits for Gran Turismo 3.

== Reception ==
Reception

Aggregate score
Aggregator	Score
Metacritic	95/100

Review scores
Publication	Score
AllGame	4.5/5
Edge	8/10
Electronic Gaming Monthly	10/10
Eurogamer	10/10
Famitsu	9/10, 10/10, 10/10, 10/10
Game Informer	9/10
GamePro	5/5
GameRevolution	B+
GameSpot	9.4/10
GameSpy	4.5/5
GameZone	9.8/10
IGN	9.8/10
Next Generation	5/5
Official U.S. PlayStation Magazine	5/5
The Cincinnati Enquirer	5/5
Maxim	10/10

Awards
Publication	Award
Game Critics Awards	Best Racing Game of 2001
6th Animation Kobe Awards	Packaged Work Award
5th Annual Interactive Achievement Awards	Console Racing

Gran Turismo 3: A-Spec received "universal acclaim" like its predecessors according to review aggregator website Metacritic. Reviewers praised its graphics, realism, soundtrack, sound design and controls. Frank O'Connor of NextGen called it "The best, most complete, and most impressive driving game so far, lapping its predecessors handily – and the first must-have for PlayStation 2." In Japan, Famitsu gave it a near-perfect score of 39 out of 40.

=== Sales ===
In Japan, the game sold 1 million units in its first three days of release. In North America, it shipped 1 million units in its first day and became the fastest-selling software launch in the region. By July 2006, it had sold 3.8 million units and earned $120,000,000 (equivalent to $218,000,000 in 2025) in the U.S. alone. NextGen ranked it as the third highest-selling game launched for the PlayStation 2, Xbox or GameCube between January 2000 and July 2006 in that country. In the United Kingdom, the game received a "Double Platinum" sales award from the Entertainment and Leisure Software Publishers Association (ELSPA), indicating sales of at least 600,000 units in the UK. In Europe, the game €64 million ($57 million) in 2001, adding up to at least more than $177,000,000 (equivalent to $322,000,000 in 2025) grossed in the United States (by 2006) and Europe (in 2001).

The game had sold over 8 million units worldwide by March 2002, and over 11 million by March 2003. As of April 30, 2008, the game has shipped 1.89 million units in Japan, 7.14 million in North America, 5.85 million in Europe, and 10,000 in Southeast Asia, for a total of 14.89 million copies. It is the highest-selling game in the Gran Turismo franchise. It is a part of the PlayStation 2's Greatest Hits. It ranked fifteenth in the list of best-selling unbundled console games of all time, just below Wii Fit Plus.

=== Awards ===
GameSpot named it the fifth-best console game of 2001, and presented it with a "Best Driving Game" award among console games. It was a runner-up in the "Best PlayStation 2 Game", "Best Sound" and "Best Graphics, Technical" categories. During the 5th Annual Interactive Achievement Awards, the Academy of Interactive Arts & Sciences honored Gran Turismo 3: A-Spec with the "Console Racing" award; it was also nominated for "Console Game of the Year" and "Outstanding Achievement in Visual Engineering", which were both ultimately given to Halo: Combat Evolved.

=== Legacy ===
The game has appeared on some 'Top 100 Games' lists such as that by IGN in 2003. In 2004, readers of Retro Gamer voted Gran Turismo 3 97th top retro gamer, with the staff noting that "the mix of realistic handling and superb graphics, not to mention the fact that it features hundreds of licensed vehicles, has won it the admiration of car lovers everywhere. The gameplay may be a little too deep and difficult for many, but for its core followers, Gran Turismo is the be all and end all of digital racing, and GT3 has been voted as the best of the bunch".
