= Tourist Trophy (video game) =

2006 racing video game

- European box art
- Developer: Polyphony Digital
- Publisher: Sony Computer Entertainment
- Director: Takamasa Shichisawa
- Producer: Kazunori Yamauchi
- Programmer: Daisuke Takeuchi
- Artist: Hiroki Imanishi
- Platform: PlayStation 2
- Release: CHN: January 26, 2006; JP: February 2, 2006; NA: April 4, 2006; AU: June 1, 2006; EU: June 2, 2006
- Genre: Sim racing
- Modes: Single-player, multiplayer

Tourist Trophy (Note: Japanese: ツーリスト・トロフィー, Hepburn: Tsūrisuto Torofī) is a 2006 racing video game developed by Polyphony Digital and published by Sony Computer Entertainment for the PlayStation 2. It is one of only three PS2 titles capable of 1080i output, another being Gran Turismo 4, the game engine of which is also used by Tourist Trophy.

Released in 2006, Tourist Trophy was first released in China on January 26, then in Japan on February 2. The North American version was released on April 4, with seven extra motorcycles, new riding gear, seven bonus background music tracks, enhanced visual effects, an exclusive "Semi-Pro Mode", and bike profiles. The game was launched in Australia on June 1, and in Europe the next day. The PAL version offered two additional motorcycles and five new BGM tracks from European artists Infadels, Vitalic and Hystereo.

== Gameplay ==
=== TT Mode ===
==== License School ====
Tourist Trophy's core "Race Event" mode requires licenses, obtained after completing riding lessons on various circuits using various motorcycles. There are four licenses to unlock, and each following license is progressively more difficult to obtain and allows the player to unlock faster motorcycles in Challenge Mode upon completion.

==== Challenge Mode ====
Unlike the Gran Turismo games, Tourist Trophy does not contain a currency system. The player must obtain licenses in order to complete short races in "Challenge Mode", which award motorcycles to add to their garage. Motorcycles won by the player are used and tuned to compete in championships, and are unlocked for use in the game's Arcade mode.

Tourist Trophy has 135 motorcycles with engine displacements from 124 cc to 1670 cc, including both road and race versions, from years 1961 through 2005. Dedicated racing bikes exist as semi-licensed "RacingModified" versions of street bikes, as well as five official fully licensed 2005 Suzuka 8 Hours endurance bikes. Motorcycles from many major manufacturers, as well as two specialized Japanese tuners, Moriwaki and Yoshimura, are included; bikes from the latter two can only be obtained as prizes in Race Events.

37 different track layouts are present in the game, including 22 original courses, the Tsukuba Circuit motorcycle layout, and two versions of Fuji Speedway as it appeared in the 1980s and 1990s.

The motorcycle selection covers a broad range of modern motorcycles, including scooters, enduros, motards, sports bikes and naked bikes, as well as any respective "RacingModified" versions. For "RacingModified" bikes, a racing number from 5 through 99 can be selected—numbers 1 through 4 must be won in Race Events.

==== Race Event ====
Race Events are championships that consist of multiple races. Winning all races within a championship will award the player with new motorcycles and riding gear, and finishing an entire championship will grant the player's motorcycle a special racing number depending on their overall position. Prize bikes include "RacingModified" variants unavailable in Challenge Mode, and a classic racing motorcycle, the 1961 Honda RC162. Completing all 22 Race Events initially available will unlock a bonus 23rd Race Event.

Completing the game will unlock an ending cinematic and add the "Clover Crown" ending theme to the "Music Theater".

==== Riding Gear ====
A feature exclusive to Tourist Trophy is "Riding Gear" (named "Closet" in the Asian editions). The player can unlock and collect 186 different riding accessories for their rider, including different helmets, gloves, boots or shoes, pants, jackets, and one-piece racing suits commercially available from more than a dozen manufacturers (Simpson, Vanson Leathers, Alpinestars, Arai, Shoei, Kushitani, RS Taichi, Dainese, AGV, Lewis Leathers, Bell, SPIDI, and XPD). Up to four different combinations can be saved, including two racing suits and two street riding outfits.

The Suzuka 8 Hours racing motorcycles have their own respective racing suits, which can only be used with said bikes selected. The player cannot use any other riding gear with these motorcycles.

=== Riding Form ===
The "Riding Form" option is available in both Arcade Mode and TT Mode.

Before an Arcade Mode race, the user can choose among four Riding Form presets: "Lean Body", "Neutral", "Lean Bike" and "Motard/Dirt". Lean Body focuses on quick cornering, Neutral focuses on handling, and Lean Bike prioritizes slow cornering. The Motard/Dirt form with one leg out in turns is dedicated to enduro and naked bike riding, but the user is free to use it on all bikes. This mode is named after the mode in Gran Turismo games.

In TT Mode, the user can enter the Garage Riding Form settings with up to four fully customizable forms to save. They are saved as "Form A", "Form B", "Form C" and "Motard/Dirt". Each one has eleven unique parameters and four presets: "Neutral", "Lean Body", "Lean Bike" and "Motard/Dirt" from which to choose.

The adjustable parameters are as follows:

- "Head Roll Angle" dictates how far to the side the rider's head turns in corners.
- "Head Pitch Angle" dictates how far up or down the rider's head is positioned.
- "Lateral Slide" determines how far the rider's hips slide towards the inside of a turn. Increasing this value raises cornering speed at the cost of stability and responsiveness (as a result of the change in center of mass).
- "Vertical Slide" dictates how much the rider tucks their body in towards the bike in corners.
- "Body Lean (Full Bank)" dictates the extent to which the rider leans into corners.
- "Torso Roll Angle" determines how far the rider's torso leans into corners. Decreasing this value results in increased responsiveness at the cost of stability.
- "Torso Yaw Angle" determines how far the rider's torso twists toward corners. Decreasing this value results in increased responsiveness.
- "Arm Angle" determines how far in or out the rider's elbows are positioned. Decreasing this value results in increased cornering speed (due to lower drag) at the cost of responsiveness.
- "Seat Position (Forward/Back)" determines how far forward or back the rider sits, influencing their posture and the extent to which they tuck.
- "Leg Angle" works much the same as the "Arm Angle" setting; a high value offers increased responsiveness while sacrificing cornering speed.
- "Body Lean (Upright)" dictates the extent to which the rider tucks on straights. An increased value results in lower drag, and thus higher acceleration and top speed.

=== Gameplay settings ===
Tourist Trophy's default setting is "Normal". Using the Normal setting, the player can perform maneuvers such as wheelies and stoppies on powerful-enough bikes. These possibilities are disabled with the "Professional" setting. Enabling "Professional" over the arcade-oriented "Normal" will enhance the simulation aspect and difficulty level of the game. The "Professional" setting is intended to allow a more realistic experience, with manual tucking and separate front and rear brake controls instead of the default double-brake system. The in-between "Semi-Pro Mode" is an exclusive feature of the North American edition.

Other options augmenting difficulty are "Strict Judgment"—a 10-second slowdown penalty for shortcuts as seen in Gran Turismo 4—and a "Best Line" display.

=== Other features ===
==== Photo Mode and Best Shot ====
Pre-generated photos can be taken from a race replay and saved on a PS2 memory card or a connected USB flash drive, like in Gran Turismo 4. This function is known in the game as "Best Shot". Using various replay angles from different parts of the course as a digital camera, the game is able to produce a selection of screenshots with variable compression (Normal, Fine, or Super Fine) and size (up to 1280 x 960 px @ 72 dpi). Outside of Best Shot, the game's Photo Mode allows the player to take a photo at a particular moment in a replay; its parameters are almost fully adjustable, giving the player the opportunity to compose their own photographs.

The user can choose to save the photo to the PS2 memory card or a USB flash drive, print it with a USB-compatible Epson printer, or display it in-game using the "Musical Diaporama" feature. Saved game screenshots can be exchanged with friends or published to the Internet. Formatting the USB device in Photo Mode or Best Shot will create the "DCIM/100PDITT" folder, allowing Tourist Trophy to store, upload and download game picture files generated under the form "IMG_00X.JPG". Standard USB 2.0 flash drives (including MP3 players and mobile phones) can be used to manage game JPEG files instead of the official I-O Data model.

==== Replay/ghost files ====
A memory card or USB flash drive can store Tourist Trophy replay/ghost files downloaded from either the official game website or elsewhere online, and can be used to exchange files with another USB device. Once the files are in the flash drive, the user can upload them from within the game in order to compete with a ghost (in "Time Attack" mode) or to watch a replay (in the "Replay Theater"). Each file can be used as a Replay or as a Ghost. Formatting the USB device from Theater Mode will create the "PDI" folder, allowing Tourist Trophy to store, upload and download files generated under the name "replay.dat". Standard third-party USB devices are also compatible with such files.

== Development ==
Polyphony Digital reused the physics engine, graphical user interface design, and all but one road circuit from Gran Turismo 4, but the number of NPC opponents was reduced from five in existing Gran Turismo games to only three. Tourist Trophy also uses the License School feature that was popularized by the Gran Turismo series, as well as the Photo Mode introduced in Gran Turismo 4. The B-spec mode, which appeared in Gran Turismo 4, is absent in Tourist Trophy.

While wet, dirt, and reverse racing conditions and tracks such as the Circuit de la Sarthe were removed, a unique course was recreated specifically for Tourist Trophy. The Circuit de la Comunitat Valenciana Ricardo Tormo is an official track appearing in the Superbike World Championship and MotoGP, which sees extensive use as a test circuit during the off season. It reappeared in Gran Turismo (PSP) due to its presence in Deutsche Tourenwagen Masters and the World Touring Car Championship, but did not appear in Gran Turismo 5. Polyphony ostensibly planned to add this track to Gran Turismo 5 (as it remains unused within the game's files), but was left out for unknown reasons.

== Original soundtrack ==
The Tourist Trophy original game soundtrack was released on March 15, 2006 by For Life Music Entertainment.

=== Track listing ===
- Composed by: Sun Paulo and Makoto
- Performed by: Sun Paulo, Quadra, Makoto, KASAI and Mitsuo Okada
1. "I against a speed" (Short Mix) – 3:14
2. "Discommunication" (Short Mix) – 3:32
3. "Who I am?" (Short Mix) – 3:46
4. "Forest" (Short Mix) – 8:00
5. "Fiber Optics" (Sun Paulo Remix) – 11:10
6. "Five Silver Rings" – 2:36
7. "Mystery" – 2:20
8. "Low Sky" – 2:30
9. "Mind Visions" – 2:31
10. "Introduction" – 2:34
11. "Far West" – 2:45
12. "Blue on Black" – 2:52
13. "Your Soul" – 2:23
14. "Take Your Soul" – 2:04
15. "Inside My Love" – 2:07
16. "Peaces of Mind" – 2:32
17. "OKINAWA WIND" – 3:00
18. "BRAZILIAN WIND" – 3:02
19. "CALIFORNIA WIND" – 3:32
20. "Digital Mononoke Beat PT.1" – 3:09
21. "Digital Mononoke Beat PT.2" – 2:49

== Reception ==
Reception

Aggregate score
Aggregator	Score
Metacritic	74/100

Review scores
Publication	Score
Edge	6/10
Electronic Gaming Monthly	7.17/10
Eurogamer	6/10
Famitsu	32/40
Game Informer	8.5/10
GamePro	4/5
GameRevolution	B−
GameSpot	8.2/10
GameSpy	3.5/5
GameTrailers	8.2/10
GameZone	8.8/10
IGN	8.4/10
Official U.S. PlayStation Magazine	3/5
The A.V. Club	B+
The Times	2/5

In October 2003, Sony Computer Entertainment's announcement of a Polyphony-developed motorcycle racing game generated excitement among Gran Turismo fans, and the debut of Tourist Trophy at the 2005 Tokyo Game Show was met with good reviews.

The game received "average" reviews according to the review aggregation website Metacritic. In Japan, Famitsu gave it a score of all four eights for a total of 32 out of 40. The game won IGN's award for Best PS2 Simulation of 2006.

The Academy of Interactive Arts & Sciences nominated Tourist Trophy for "Simulation Game of the Year" at the 10th Annual Interactive Achievement Awards.

== Possible sequel ==
In 2015, when asked about the possibility of a sequel to Tourist Trophy, Kazunori Yamauchi said: "I am aware that the game is expected by many fans, so I can't deny a Tourist Trophy 2". While such a sequel has not yet come to fruition, Yamauchi later admitted in an interview in 2018 that it was "still [in] the back of his mind".
