= GT Racing Cockpit =

Video game racing cockpits

GT Racing Cockpit (see the trademark symbols difference) is the name of a line of Gran Turismo official video game racing cockpits designed by Sparco and Logitech (a.k.a. Logicool in Japan) in collaboration with Polyphony Digital.

Official kits are co-designed and released in Japan by Logicool and Sparco (distributed by import tuner Endless in North America), while compatible kits are designed and released worldwide by European manufacturers such as Playseat and MoveTech.

== GT Cockpit ==
There is a FIA homologated driving simulation cockpit line which SKU is LPSK standing for Logicool PlayStation Sparco Kit. Official kits are the Logicool and auto part maker Sparco joint designed Sparco Racing Cockpit/Seat, and the official wheels are GT Force wheels.

Although GT Force wheels are supported by the professional oriented Playseat compatible kits line. The PlaySeat products are based upon a different design, e.g. the G25 Racing Wheel PlaySeat kit includes parts named Gearshift Holder and Seat Slider.

== Racing Cockpit (LPSK-01002) ==
Sparco Racing Cockpit is the official kit for the original GT Force and Gran Turismo 3 A-spec, it was released in Japan in 2001. The kits two parts are named "Steering Pod" and "Bucket Chair". As an official product the steering pod features a Sparco / Gran Turismo double name emblem plate, and the Sparco Speed seat has GT logos.

== Racing Cockpit Pro ==
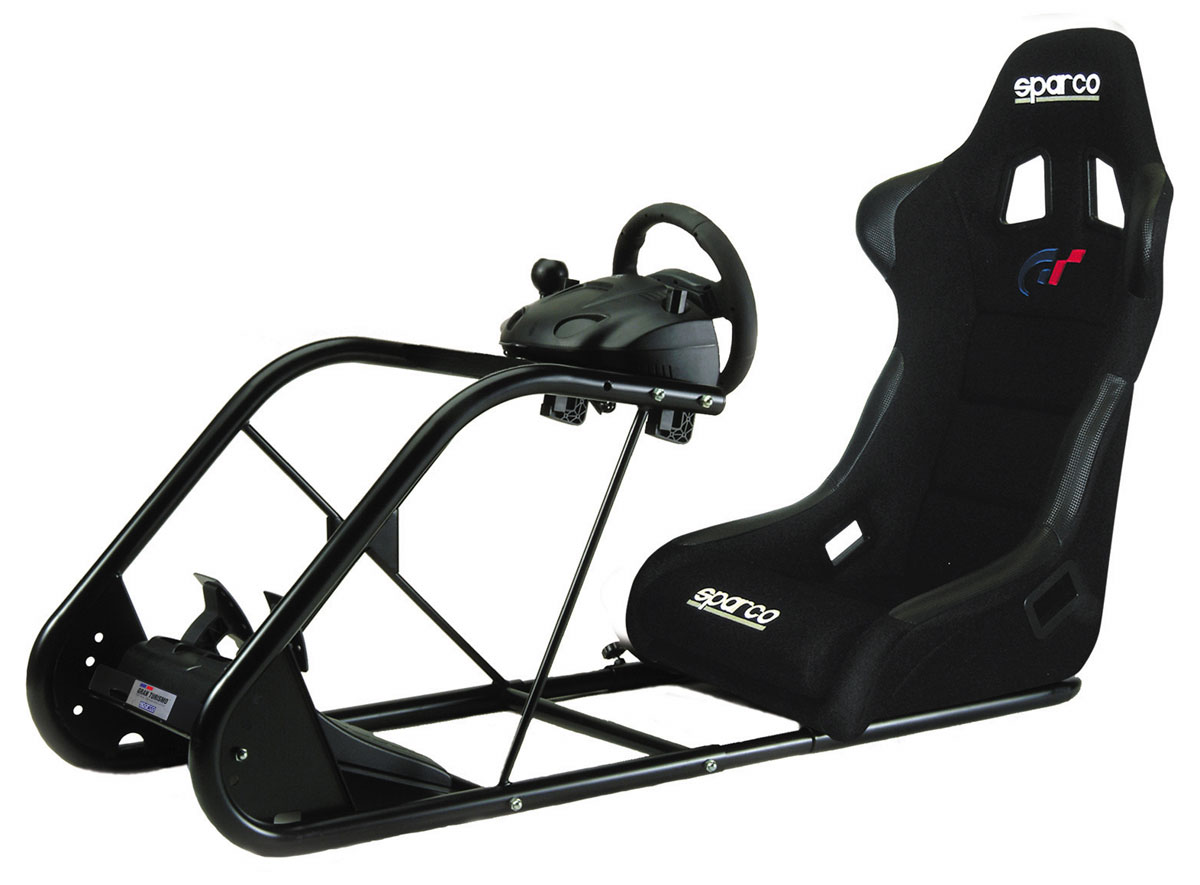
GT Force Pro (LPRC-11000) koos Racing Cockpit Pro Fighter Model (LPSK-02002) millel on peal Gran Turismo logo.

=== Racing Cockpit Pro Fighter Model (LPSK-02002) ===
Official kit for the GT Force Pro and Gran Turismo 5 Prologue is the "Sparco Racing Cockpit Pro Fighter Model" that was released on December 22, 2003 in Japan. As for the first kit, this one features an emblem plate and logos. Racing Cockpit Pro kits are specially designed for the GT Force Pro wheel and are not compatible with other models, including prior GT Force wheels.

=== Racing Cockpit Pro (LPSK-03002) ===
The updated version of the GT Force Pro and Gran Turismo 4 kit was released on June 10, 2004 in Japan. This kit replaces the Fighter seat by a Gran Turismo custom Sparco Speed seat which is an evolution of the Speed bucket seat. It still features official Sparco Gran Turismo plate and logos.

=== Racing Seat Pro (SRCP-000) ===
Released in June 2005, this Endless SKU is a North American licensed version of the Racing Cockpit Pro, hence "SRCP" (Sparco Racing Cockpit Pro). It has no seat but only the kit frame, e.g. steering floor mat and steering pod. Official Sparco / Gran Turismo plate is available though.

=== Racing Seat Pro Sprint (SRCP-001) ===
The "Sparco Sprint Bucket Seat" is the North American version of the LPSK-02002. Though, it replaces the "Fighter" bucket seat by a similar Sparco model called "Sprint". Although the Sparco / Gran Turismo plate is included, the Sparco seat is a regular one with no GT logo.

=== Racing Seat Pro Siena (SRCP-002) ===
A "larger individuals" version of the Type 1 was simultaneously released in the North American market. This version called "Sparco Siena Reclinable Seat" (or Type 2) replaces the regular bucket seat by a larger retractable model called Siena. As for the SRCP-001 kit, the Sparco seat is not a GT custom.
