= Gran Turismo (series) =

Series of racing video games

- Genre: Sim racing
- Developers: Sony Computer Entertainment Japan; Polyphony Digital
- Publisher: Sony Interactive Entertainment
- Creator: Kazunori Yamauchi
- Platforms: PlayStation; PlayStation 2; PlayStation 3; PlayStation 4; PlayStation 5; PlayStation Portable
- First release: Gran Turismo; 23 December 1997
- Latest release: My First Gran Turismo; 6 December 2024

Gran Turismo (Note: Japanese: グランツーリスモ, Hepburn: Guran Tsūrisumo) (Note: "Gran Turismo" is Italian for "grand touring") (GT) is a series of sim racing video games developed by Polyphony Digital. Released for PlayStation systems exclusively, Gran Turismo games are intended to emulate the appearance and performance of a large selection of vehicles, most of which are licensed reproductions of real-world automobiles. Since the franchise's debut in 1997, over 100 million units have been sold worldwide, making it the highest selling video game franchise under the PlayStation brand.

Handling of the vehicles in Gran Turismo games is based on the principles of real-world physics, requiring the player to understand real race driving techniques to be competitive, although various assists are available for less experienced drivers. The series features a wide variety of vehicles, ranging from everyday cars to exotic sports cars and purpose-built racing cars, and from classics to modern cars. Various modifications can usually be made to the cars to alter their performance and appearance. The games often include numerous tracks to drive on, with both laser scanned replicas of real-world venues and fictional tracks appearing throughout the series. The series also performed as technical support for cars in the LMP1 class of the 24 Hours of Le Mans and the Nürburgring 24-hour race.

Gran Turismo games typically feature a single-player campaign with numerous races, championships, license tests and other challenges. Completing these events rewards the player with prizes such as in-game money, which can be used to purchase new vehicles or upgrade existing ones. Players generally start with slower and cheaper cars and build up a garage featuring faster and more expensive cars as they progress through the game. Newer installments in the series have also included an online multiplayer element, which features both competitive and casual play. Notable competitions held on Gran Turismo include the Gran Turismo World Series and the former GT Academy.

Gran Turismo is one of PlayStation's most successful franchises, having garnered both commercial success and critical acclaim. The first title in the series was the highest selling game for the original PlayStation, while four subsequent installments have been among the top-three best-selling games for their respective consoles. Multiple entries in the series have been ranked among the greatest video games of all time. In 2023, the series received a film adaptation, and it became a sport for the Olympic Esports with the backing of the FIA. Many car manufacturers have designed virtual concept cars specifically for the series, and it has partnerships with Brembo, Dunlop Tyres, Mazda, Toyota Gazoo Racing, and Fanatec for the Gran Turismo World Series. In 2024, Mercedes-AMG recognized Gran Turismo 7 as part of sim racing.

== Gameplay ==
The Gran Turismo series is known for its accurate driving physics emulation, a large number of licensed vehicles, attention to vehicle detail, the ability to tune a car's performance, and realistic graphics. Its physics emulation includes "real-world dynamics such as weight transfer, suspension response, and understeer/oversteer characteristics". The Sim has been a flagship for the PlayStation console's graphics capabilities, and is often used to demonstrate the system's potential. It has a replay system shown with a cinematic presentation. The physics of the vehicles are based on their real-life counterparts, and they are represented in the PlayStation controllers' rumble features and in specialized racing wheels designed for Gran Turismo and sim racing.

Gameplay from Gran Turismo Sport, featuring a Mazda MX-5 at the Nürburgring Nordschleife

Although Gran Turismo has an arcade mode, most gameplay derives from its simulation mode. Players start with a certain number of credits, usually 10,000, which are used to purchase vehicles from several manufacturer-specific shops, or (more likely at the beginning) from used car dealers, and then tune their car at the appropriate parts store for best performance. Certain events are open only to particular types of vehicles. In order to enter and progress through more difficult races, a license-testing system has been implemented, which guides players through skill development. Players may apply prize money won in events to upgrade their existing car or buy a new one, collecting a garage of vehicles. Gran Turismo was the first modern simulator of the 21st century to promote racing with a wheel, instead of a controller.

== History ==
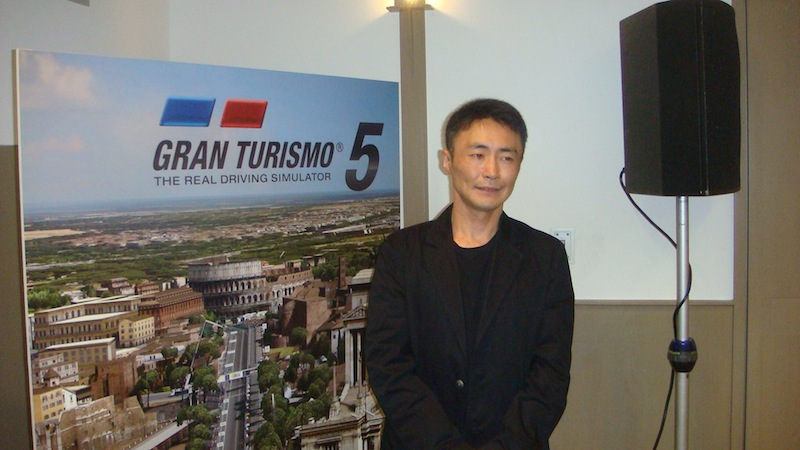
Series creator Kazunori Yamauchi in 2010

The series' origins can be traced back to 1992, when Kazunori Yamauchi, at the time an employee at Sony Computer Entertainment Japan, started developing the original Gran Turismo with a team named Polys Entertainment; that started with five people and eventually became seventeen. The development took five years to complete. In comparison to the era's other racing games, which had "over-simplified" arcade-style racing with exaggerated car movement, Gran Turismo is a complex racing simulator. Sony initially rejected Yamauchi's pitch for a realistic racing sim. However, his team was still working on it as a side project. After the success of the team's other arcade racing games, Motor Toon Grand Prix and Motor Toon Grand Prix 2, he pitched the idea to Sony again, and they accepted it.

Gameplay from the first Gran Turismo, featuring a Mitsubishi FTO GPX on the fictional Trial Mountain Circuit

Release timeline
1997	Gran Turismo
1998
1999	Gran Turismo 2
2000
2001	Gran Turismo 3: A-Spec
2002	Gran Turismo Concept
2003	Gran Turismo 4 Prologue
2004	Gran Turismo 4
2005
2006	Gran Turismo HD Concept
2007	Gran Turismo 5 Prologue
2008
2009	Gran Turismo (PSP)
2010	Gran Turismo 5
2011
2012
2013	Gran Turismo 6
2014
2015
2016
2017	Gran Turismo Sport
2018
2019
2020
2021
2022	Gran Turismo 7
2023
2024	My First Gran Turismo

The first Gran Turismo essentially has role-playing elements; players start the sim with "entry-level cars" which can be upgraded over time, and faster cars can be bought with prize money from winning races. The complexities of the simulation are taught to the player through in-sim driving tests. It has a realistic visual style which demonstrated the PlayStation's visual capabilities, and had a roster of licensed vehicles larger than any other sim at the time, at 150. The vehicles can also be customized. The game's content was accessible via icons in a hub world. The sim was released for the PlayStation in Japan in 1997, 1998 for North America, Europe, and other territories. By mid-1998, it had sold two million copies in Japan. Polyphony Digital was founded shortly after the sims's release. Gran Turismo 2 was released for the PlayStation in Japan and North America in 1999, and PAL regions in 2000. Players could now compete in rally events, and had a larger roster of cars, at 650. Seven tracks are available for racing, two of them available in reversed layouts. The size of the sim meant it had to be put onto two discs.

The next four sims were released on PlayStation 2 (PS2). Gran Turismo 3: A-Spec was released in 2001, originally titled Gran Turismo 2000. The player can maintain their car by changing its oil and washing it in the new "GT Auto" area. Endurance events are racing marathons where the player drives around the same track for a long time, performing pit stops, with the winning prize being a new car. Three versions of a spin-off sim, Gran Turismo Concept, were released in 2002: Gran Turismo Concept: 2001 Tokyo, Gran Turismo Concept: 2002 Tokyo-Seoul, and Gran Turismo Concept: 2002 Tokyo-Geneva. Gran Turismo 4 Prologue was released in 2003. The series' subtitle has been "The Real Driving Simulator" since the first Gran Turismo, according to Polyphony Digital. The sim's list was significantly larger than A-Spec's, at 700. The hub world was expanded to be much larger. New modes included a photography mode, and a mode where the player acts as a "mogul" of an AI racer the player employs. The AI racer, known as the "B driver", races on the player's behalf, and gains driving skills over their career. They can perform endurance events.

A youth-focused Gran Turismo was announced in November 2004 with a scheduled release date of 2005, though the sim was not released at that time. In September 2006, Kazunori Yamauchi confirmed the sim was still in development. In April 2008, while discussing plans for Gran Turismo 5, Kazunori Yamauchi was quoted as saying, "we're hoping to make Gran Turismo for Boys a feature within GT5." In a 2013 interview with GTPlanet, Kazunori Yamauchi said that the 2009 game Gran Turismo was a rendition of the Gran Turismo for Boys idea, and there was no need for a separate sim.

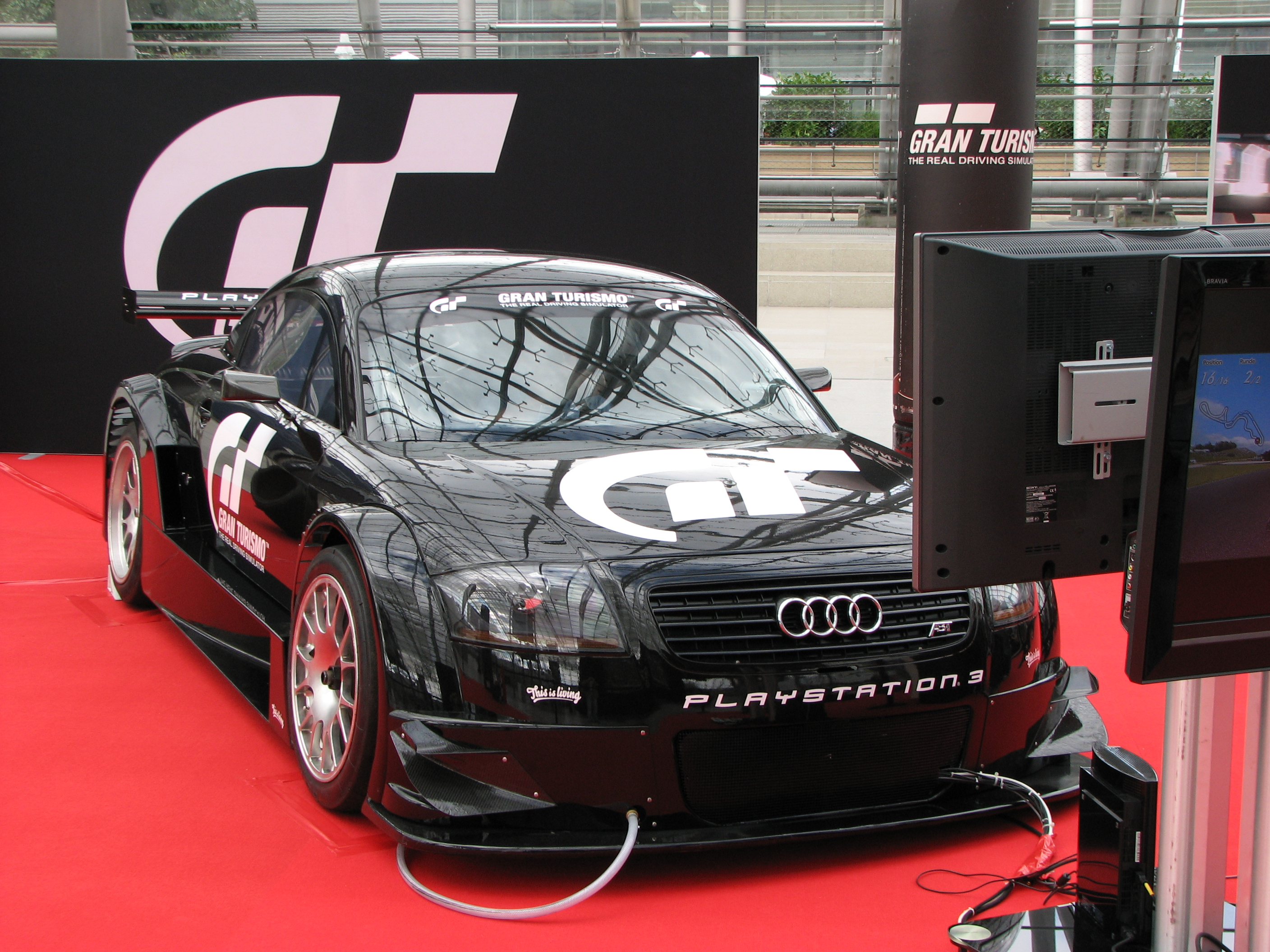
The Gran Turismo 5 Prologue booth at Games Convention 2008

Sony demonstrated an updated version of Gran Turismo 4, Vision Gran Turismo, at E3 2005, and it would be the basis for Gran Turismo 5 when it released years later. Yamauchi said that developing for the PlayStation 3 (PS3) was a "nightmare", and the game's release was delayed multiple times. Gran Turismo 4 Online Test Version, Polyphony's test of future series development, was released for the PS2 in 2006. It featured online play, which was a feature cut out of Gran Turismo 4 mid-development. When online, players could join races seeking entrants, look at other players' profiles, or join up a chat room to talk over private races with up to 100 people at once. Gran Turismo HD Concept, a demo, was the first PS3 sim in the series, and released in 2006. It had ten playable cars and one track.

Since Gran Turismo 5 Prologue launched on the PS3 in 2007, the series has included online play. The sim enabled users to race online with up to 16 players on track at once.

Another installment titled simply Gran Turismo was released for the PlayStation Portable in 2009. It has 800 cars and 35 tracks, each track having a reversed layout version. It also does not have the series' traditional career mode; instead, IGN wrote, it was "just racing". Gran Turismo 5 was shown off at E3 2009, and released for the PS3 in 2010. It was the first game in the series to have the GT Academy, a former initiative in which players of the game could become real-life motorsport racers. According to Yamauchi, the cars in the first two sims were made from 300 polygons, while those in Gran Turismo 3 and 4 were made up of 4,000 polygons, and the "premium cars" in Gran Turismo 5 were made up of 500,000 ("standard cars" are slightly more detailed versions of those in Gran Turismo 4). Gran Turismo 6 was released for the PS3 in 2013, and was unannounced until shortly before its release. It released after the PlayStation 4 (PS4) was already out, which resulted from the same development issues that affected Gran Turismo 5. Players now had 1,200 cars to drive with.

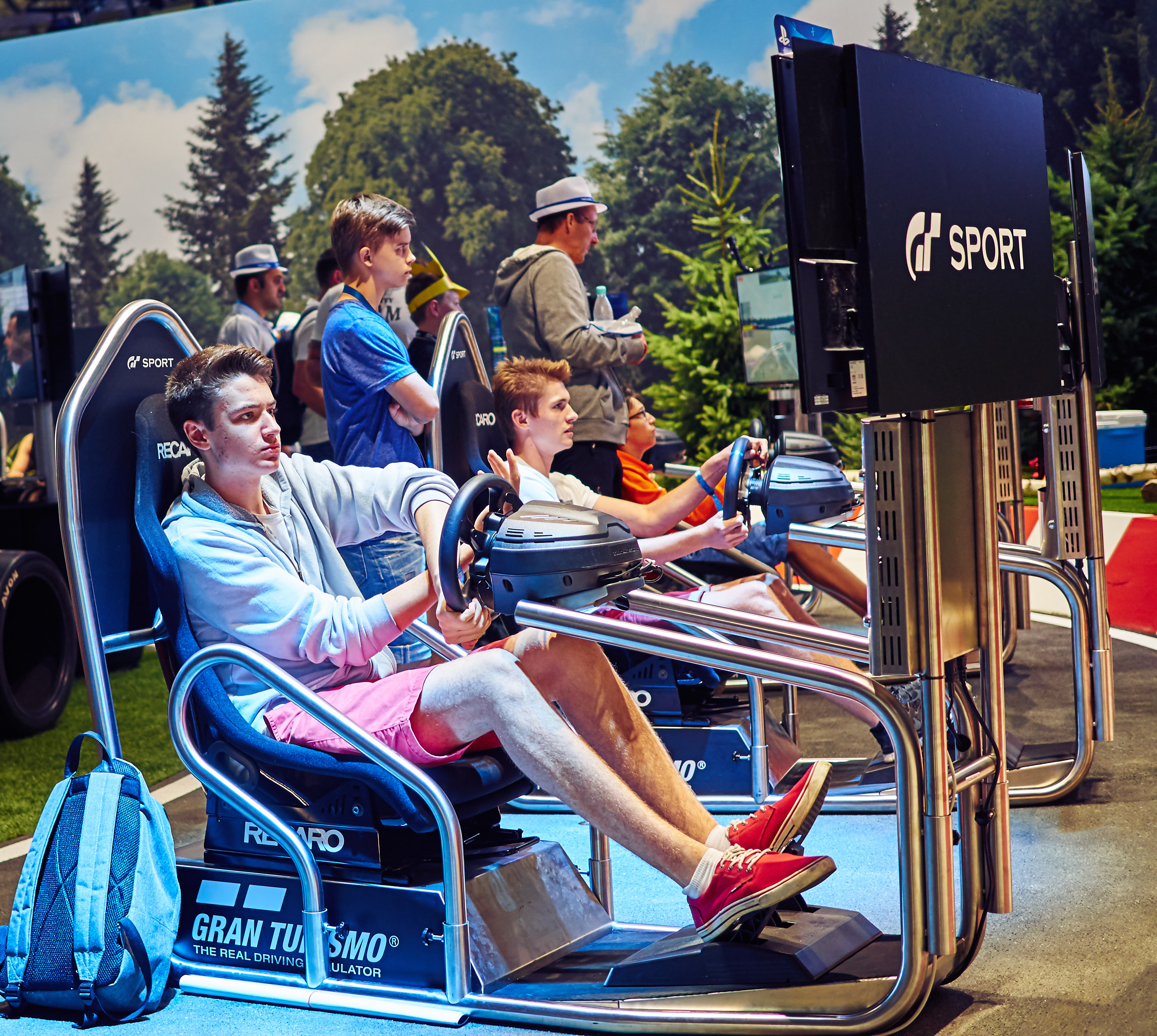
The Gran Turismo Sport booth at Gamescom 2016

Yamauchi said the PS4 was much easier to develop for. Gran Turismo Sport was then released for the console in 2017. The sim was the first in the series to focus on online-only racing, meaning it has no single-player mode. It also did not include a career mode, and thus, the idea of "car ownership". The sim received post-release content at no charge, including cars and tracks, along with offline events, as well as bug fixes. The most recent sim in the series, Gran Turismo 7, was revealed at the PS5 Future of Gaming event in 2020. The title was developed for PlayStation 4 and PlayStation 5, and was released in 2022. The sim brought back the series' usual career mode.

=== Other releases ===
During Christmas 1998, a special promotional demo of Gran Turismo was included with the PlayStation console. The demo was limited to an Arcade Mode race at Clubman Stage Route 5 with three cars (Subaru Impreza WRX, Honda NSX, and Chevrolet Corvette), with the race limited to ninety seconds. Other demos existed in other regions with different restrictions.

Gran Turismo 2000 was a demo on display at E3 2000 and 2001, promoting the capabilities of the PlayStation 2. Due to a delay in the release date, the name of the final version of the sim was changed to Gran Turismo 3: A-Spec. A demo version of the sim was given out for the visitors of PlayStation Festival 2000, allowing the players to drive a Mitsubishi Lancer Evolution V in Seattle Circuit for two minutes.

In the summer of 2004, Toyota sent a demo disc of GT4 along with a marketing brochure for its 2004 Prius hybrid car by way of customer request from their website. The demo was also given out at a presentation of the Toyota MTRC at the New York International Auto Show. The demo disc featured only two cars, namely the Prius and the Toyota MTRC concept car. Two tracks were included, Fuji Speedway ('90s version) and Grand Canyon rally track, but each was limited to two minutes of play time. Toyota stopped offering the demo discs when the requests for the marketing brochure became disproportional to the real interest in their cars. The disc became a collectible item for Prius owners and is still sometimes available via auction at eBay. The game ran on a modified GT4P engine.

The Gran Turismo 4 – BMW 1-Series demo disc features two models of the BMW 1 Series (120i and 120d), and three Gran Turismo 4 tracks – including the Nürburgring (driving around this circuit was limited to three minutes). BMW customers in the United Kingdom who ordered a 1-series before its official release date were invited to a private event at the Rockingham Motor Speedway in Northamptonshire. On departure from the event, all guests were given a pack containing the demo disc. The game ran on a modified pre-release GT4 engine.

With the release of the Nissan Micra Roma, Nissan distributed a press kit for each concessionaire in several countries in Europe to promote the car. This press kit included several photographs, a press information booklet and three discs. One of the discs included in this kit is an official Gran Turismo demo named Nissan Micra Edition. Similarly, the Gran Turismo – Nissan 350Z Edition demo disc also comes in one of the many press kits available for the Nissan 350Z in the United States. There is no confirmation that a European version exists. The press kit containing the game demo comes with two other discs inside a silver folder. An additional booklet with information and pictures of the Nissan 350Z is also included. The game ran on a modified Gran Turismo Concept engine and races are limited on 150 seconds. Only Côte d'Azur, not available in Gran Turismo Concept but available in Gran Turismo 3: A-Spec, was the available course.

Tourist Trophy is a motorcycle racing sim released on 26 January 2006. It was designed by Polyphony Digital. It was largely created off of the Gran Turismo 4 sim engine. Tourist Trophy is one of only four titles for the PlayStation 2 that is capable of 1080i output, the others being Gran Turismo 4 and the Japanese version of Valkyrie Profile 2: Silmeria. Polyphony Digital reused the physics engine, graphical user interface and all but one of the circuits found in Gran Turismo 4. The number of AI racers was reduced from the series' usual five to only three. Tourist Trophy also uses the License School feature that was popularized by the Gran Turismo series, as well as the Photo Mode introduced in Gran Turismo 4. The B-spec mode, which appeared in Gran Turismo 4, was removed from Tourist Trophy.

The Gran Turismo Academy Time Trial demo was released on 17 December 2009. It featured the Indianapolis GP Circuit for the first time in the franchise's history and also included a tuned and stock Nissan 370Z. The object of the Time Trial was as the first stage of the 2010 GT Academy to find two of the best Gran Turismo drivers to end up competing in a real racing car in a real racing series. The demo showed off a new physics model and some graphical improvements to GT5 Prologue but was also criticised. Its primary objective was as the first stage of the 2010 GT Academy and not as a demonstration of the upcoming Gran Turismo 5.

=== Online services ===
On September 1, 2006, the online beta test build online services for Gran Turismo 4 on the PlayStation 2 have ended. On September 30, 2011, the online services for Gran Turismo 5 Prologue on the PlayStation 3 were terminated. On May 30, 2014, the online services for Gran Turismo 5 on the PlayStation 3 were shut down with all DLCs delisted on April 29, 2014. On March 28, 2018, the online services for Gran Turismo 6 on the PlayStation 3 were terminated. On January 31, 2024, the online services for Gran Turismo Sport on the PlayStation 4 were shut down with all DLCs delisted on December 1, 2023. The online services for Gran Turismo 7 on the PlayStation 4 and PlayStation 5 remain operational.

== Related products ==
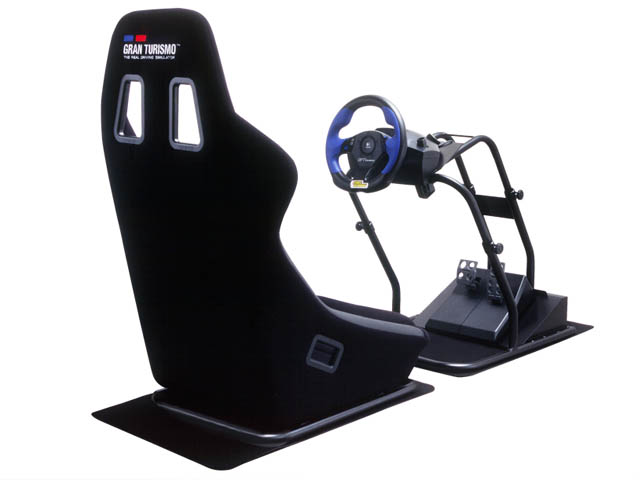
Official Gran Turismo kit with GT Force and Racing Cockpit

Polyphony Digital has collaborated with peripherals manufacturer Logitech and auto parts maker Sparco to design official driving simulator kits for the Gran Turismo franchise. The most recent product designation is Driving Force GT. Two other racing wheels are compatible with Gran Turismo.

In 2009, radio-control model car company HPI Racing released an official RC car tie-in: the HPI E10 RTR Ford GT LM Race Car Spec II designed by Gran Turismo (200mm), a pre-built officially licensed radio-control car kit built to look exactly like the cover car for Gran Turismo 4 . Plans for future releases include releasing more kits to replicate other Gran Turismo cover cars.

== Sponsorships and partnerships with the car industry ==
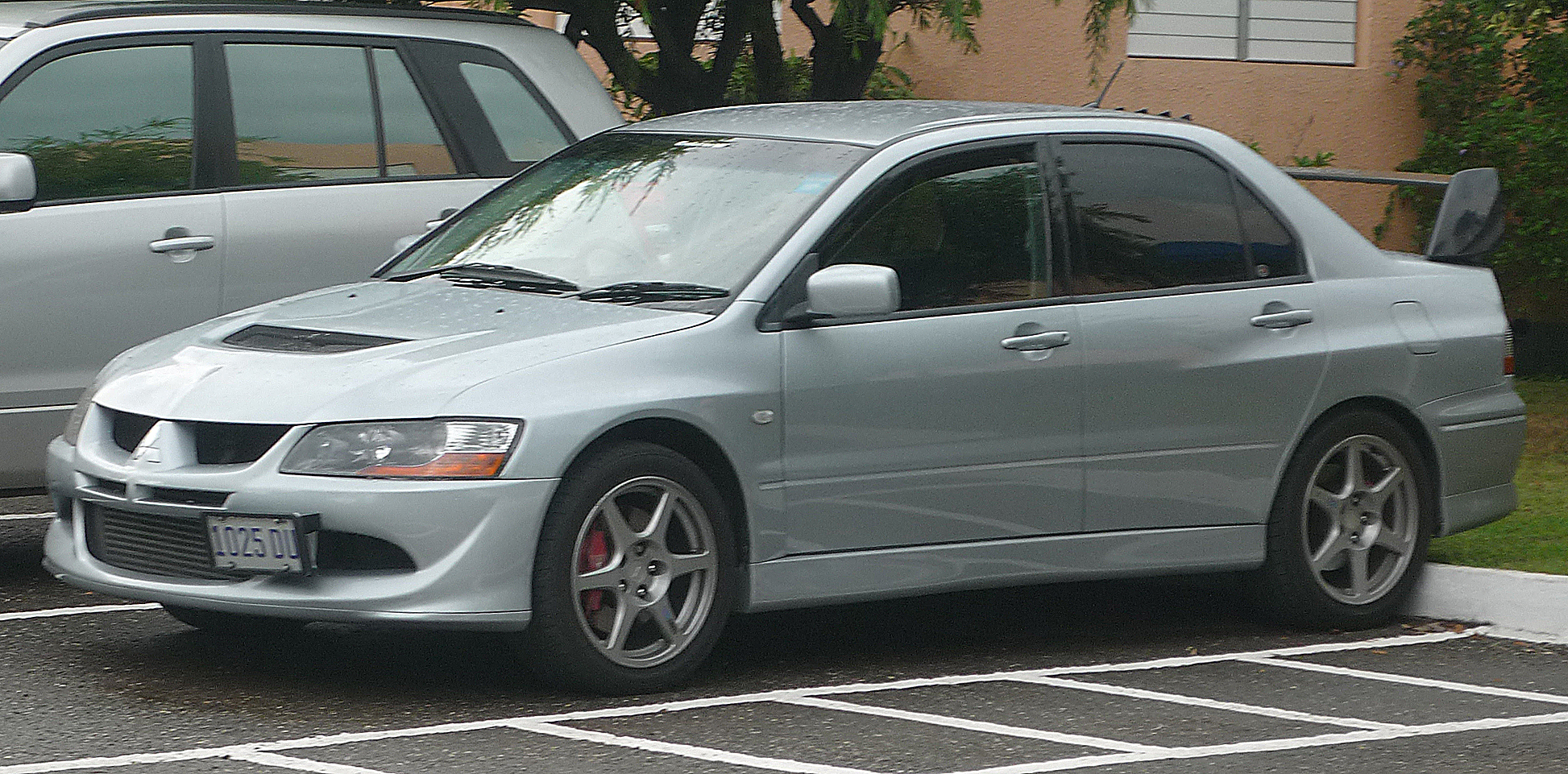
Mitsubishi said their Lancer Evolution VIII model was brought to the United States partially because of the Evolution line's inclusion in Gran Turismo.

Gran Turismo lead to greater involvement of the car industry in racing sims. The series increased sales of several of its playable cars, including the Mitsubishi Lancer Evolution VIII. The first seven models of the Lancer Evolution series were only sold in Japan, and the eighth model was brought to America in a decision Mitsubishi said was partially inspired by the popularity of the game. The TVR car brand from the United Kingdom increased six-fold in sales after its inclusion in the first game. The series has had partnerships, both former and current, with Japan Race Promotion, Brembo, Dunlop Tyres, Michelin, Mazda, Toyota Gazoo Racing, BBS, and Fanatec. The series has worked with Mercedes-Benz, BMW, Mitsubishi, Volkswagen, Nissan, Chaparral, Subaru, Mazda, Infiniti, Alpine, Dodge, Bugatti, Lamborghini, Ferrari, and various other car manufactures to come up with cars for the future with the Vision Gran Turismo project. Participating manufacturers in the Gran Turismo World Series are Alfa Romeo, AMG, Aston Martin, Audi, BMW, Chevrolet, Citroën, Dodge, Ferrari, Ford, Genesis, Honda, Hyundai, Jaguar, Lamborghini, Lexus, Mazda, McLaren, Mitsubishi, Nissan, Peugeot, Porsche, Renault, Subaru, Suzuki, Toyota, and Volkswagen.

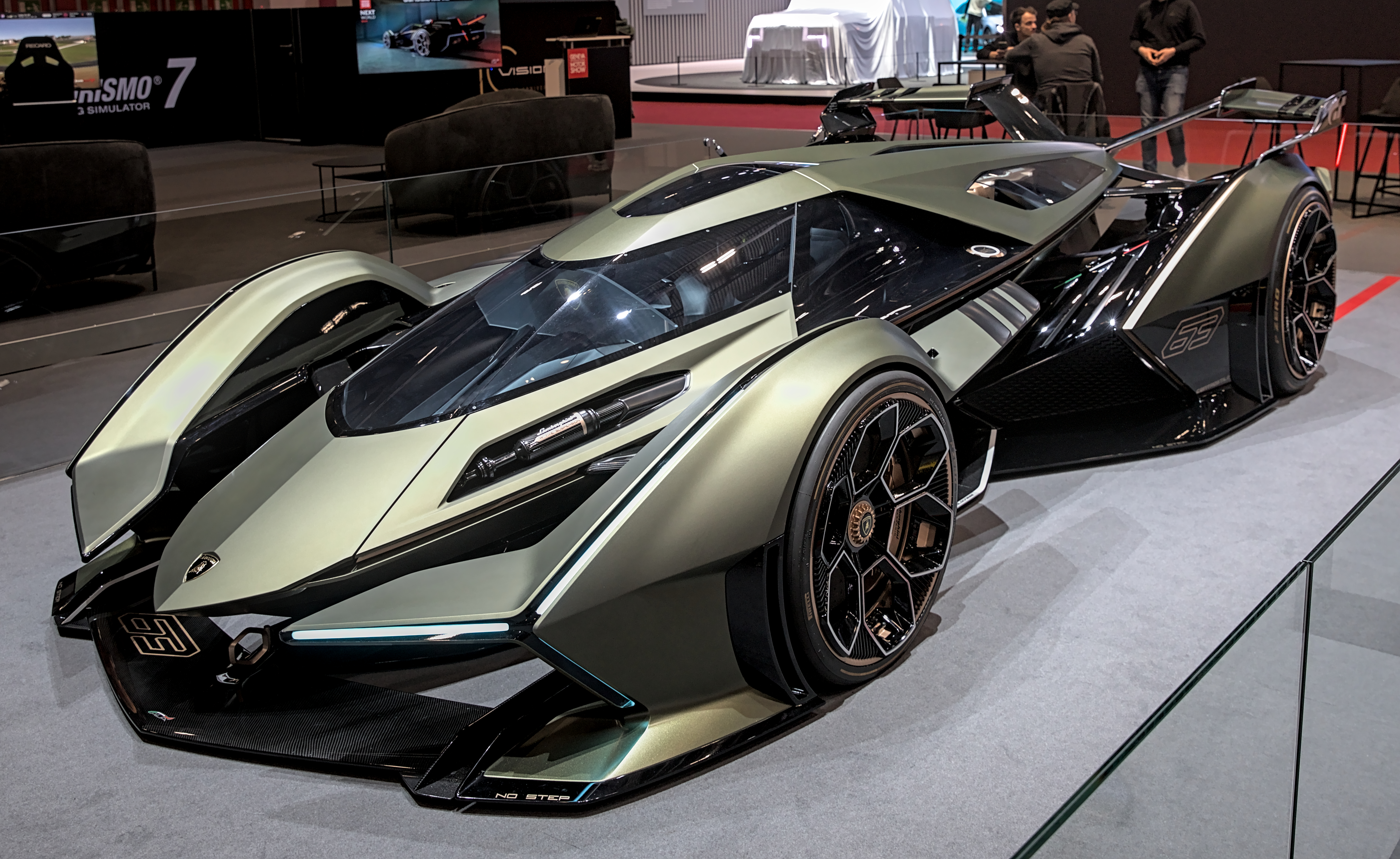
Lamborghini used Gran Turismo as a concept car simulator to make the Lambo V12.

The series has been involved in sponsoring various sporting events and teams, including Super GT, Super Formula, the Pikes Peak International Hill Climb as of November 2014, D1GP since the 2008 season, the 2004 Race of Champions, the first chicane on the Mulsanne Straight at Circuit de la Sarthe until 2012, and racing teams/drivers such as Prost Grand Prix, Pescarolo Sport, Audi/Oreca, Peugeot, Abt Sportsline, Signatech-Nissan, Audi A4 DTM, Vita4One-BMW Z4, Aston Martin Rapide S, Igor Fraga, Lewis Hamilton, and Sébastien Loeb. In 2009, a Gran Turismo-themed cafe opened at the Twin Ring Motegi racetrack. The series also performed as technical support for cars in the LMP1 class of the 24 Hours of Le Mans.

== Competitions ==
=== GT Academy ===
The GT Academy was a driver discovery/development program initiated through a partnership between Sony Computer Entertainment Europe, Polyphony Digital, and Nissan Europe. The program lasted from 2008 to 2016.

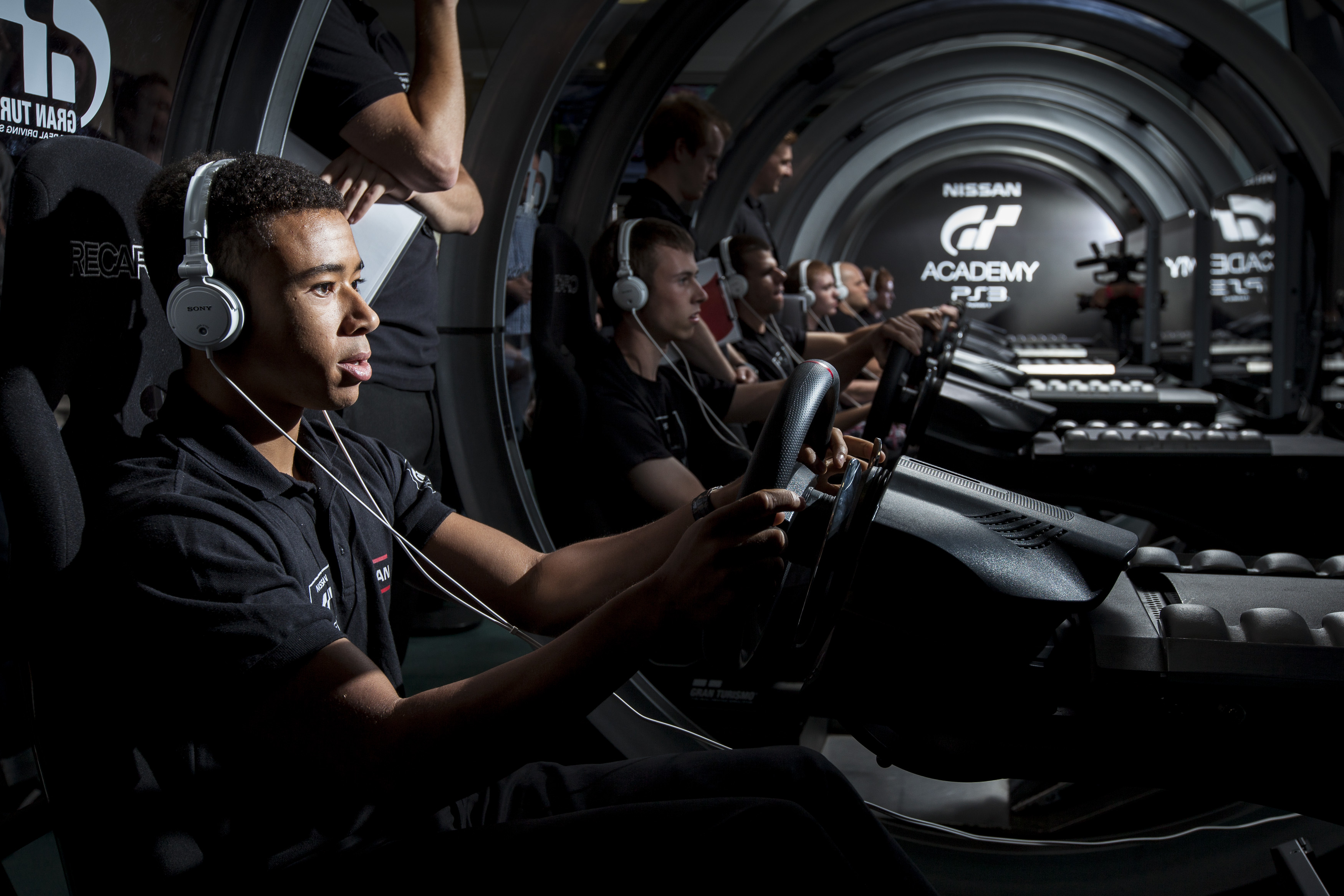
2011 GT Academy winner Jann Mardenborough joins competitors at the UK National Final in 2013.

Online qualifiers were held within Gran Turismo, with the top qualifiers being invited to National Finals in each participating country. The top winners of each country were sent to a Race Camp held at Silverstone, UK for the final selection. The winners were to undergo an intensive Driver Development Program designed by Nissan with the intention to train and license them into a professional driver, competing in races worldwide. The four winning drivers were to join the Nismo Global Driver Exchange and go on to race in the following years' Dubai 24 Hour. Winners of the Gran Turismo Academy include Lucas Ordóñez, Jordan Tresson and Jann Mardenborough, who have all gone on to compete in professional real-life racing. Some of these winners, who would normally be seen as "non-professionals", have received praise relating to how they are as skilled as drivers with years of experience. Based on this merit, four GT Academy drivers have been barred entry to the British GT (specifically the 'gentleman driver' section of the competition).

=== Gran Turismo World Series ===
The Gran Turismo World Series is a series of Gran Turismo tournaments held around the world since 2018. The competition was known as the FIA Certified Gran Turismo Championships until the end of the 2021 season.

=== Olympic Virtual Series ===
In 2021, the FIA and the International Olympic Committee collaborated and hosted the Olympic Virtual Series, in which Gran Turismo Sport was used as one of the games used to host the motorsport event. The motorsport virtual series was an online time trial competition, in which entry is open to all players of Gran Turismo Sport's Sport Mode.

In 2023, it was announced that Gran Turismo would be a part of the Olympics Esports Series 2023 as the motorsport event. Gran Turismo 7 was used for the inaugural Olympic Esports Week motorsport event in Singapore, held from 22 June to 25 June, and the final was won by France's Kylian Drumont.

== Reception ==
Aggregate review scores
Game	Metacritic
Gran Turismo (1997)	(PS1) 96/100
Gran Turismo 2	(PS1) 93/100
Gran Turismo 3: A-Spec	(PS2) 95/100
Gran Turismo Concept: 2001 Tokyo	(PS2) 77% (Note: GameRankings score)
Gran Turismo Concept: 2002 Tokyo-Geneva	(PS2) 75%
Gran Turismo 4 Prologue	(PS2) 68%
Gran Turismo 4	(PS2) 89/100
Gran Turismo HD Concept	(PS3) 82/100
Gran Turismo 5 Prologue	(PS3) 80/100
Gran Turismo (2009)	(PSP) 74/100
Gran Turismo 5	(PS3) 84/100
Gran Turismo 6	(PS3) 81/100
Gran Turismo Sport	(PS4) 75/100
Gran Turismo 7	(PS4) 82/100 (PS5) 87/100
My First Gran Turismo	

The Gran Turismo sim series has been one of the most popular over its lifetime, appealing to an audience ranging from amateur to professional sim racers like Igor Fraga.

In 2017, Edge said the first Gran Turismo was one of the 10 greatest video games of the last 20 years. Gran Turismo 2, Gran Turismo 3: A-Spec, Gran Turismo 4, and Gran Turismo 5 have all been named by different organizations as one of the best games of all time. Gran Turismo Sport's changes to series tradition were initially controversial among fans, but it ultimately became a popular game for esports competitions. Gran Turismo 7 was strongly criticized by players for its implementation of microtransactions and a "pay-to-play" system. The user score in Metacritic as of 20 March 2022 is 2.2 out of 10, which is Sony's lowest user rating and the lowest score in PlayStation exclusive history on the site to date.

Because of the success of the Gran Turismo series, Guinness World Records awarded the series seven world records in the Guinness World Records: Gamer's Edition 2008. These records include "Largest Number of Cars in a Racing Game", "Highest Selling PlayStation Game", "Oldest Car in a Racing Game", and "Largest Instruction Guide for a Racing Game". The success of the series has led to other studios creating simulation racing games similar to the franchise. An early example was Advan Racing by Atlus, which was released for the original PlayStation in November 1998. Sega's answer to the franchise, Sega GT, was released on the short-lived Dreamcast console and later had a sequel on the original Xbox before the franchise died off after low sales. Turn 10 would later create the Forza Motorsport series for the Xbox consoles, which later saw releases on Windows, which has been often seen as the primary rival of the Gran Turismo series. Other similar titles include Driving Emotion Type-S by Square and Enthusia Professional Racing by Konami.

In 2005, Maeda Corporation, in association with Tokyo University of Science, researched the feasibility of making a real-life replica version of the fictional Grand Valley Speedway used in the series.

In acknowledgment of the Mount Panorama Circuit's inclusion in Gran Turismo 6, the City of Bathurst in Australia unveiled a new street called Gran Turismo Drive in December 2013. Mayor of Bathurst, Gary Rush said "Driving a lap of our world famous motor racing circuit is a life changing experience for those who have the chance, and the Bathurst Regional Council is very excited about opening up the Mount Panorama experience through the launch of Gran Turismo 6." Also in 2013, series creator Kazunori Yamauchi had a street named in honor of him in the city of Ronda, Spain. Named Paseo de Kazunori Yamauchi, the street snakes around the Parador de Ronda. According to Ronda's city mayor Maria de la Paz Fernandez Lobato, "There is no doubt that his work has a huge cultural resonance with people today. He has driven the racing game genre to new levels of realism and his creations are as much art as technology. Ronda's association with Gran Turismo is also a reflection that our ancient city is a modern, vibrant place to live and very much part of the 21st century."

The series was specifically stated to be the inspiration for two of its most popular competitor franchises, Forza by Turn 10 Studios and Assetto Corsa by Kunos Simulazioni. Turn 10 founder Dan Greenawalt said that playing Gran Turismo led him to buy his first car he wanted and joining the gaming industry, while Kunos Simulazioni co-founder Marco Massarutto specifically cited the series as the model for Assetto Corsa’s approach to attracting car enthusiasts for PCs.

=== Sales ===
More than 100 million copies of Gran Turismo titles have been sold. It is the highest-selling sim series on PlayStation consoles. The first Gran Turismo sold just under 11 million copies, making it the highest-selling sim on the original PlayStation. Gran Turismo 2 is the third-best selling sim on the console, at 9 million. As of 2022, Gran Turismo 3: A-Spec was the highest-selling out of the entire series, at 15 million copies. It was also the second-highest selling game on the PS2, behind Grand Theft Auto: San Andreas. Gran Turismo 4 was the third best-selling game on the console. Gran Turismo 5 was the second-highest selling out of the entire series, which IGN attributes to the long wait between the series' main installments. Gran Turismo 6 sold half-the copies of the previous game, being even lower than 5 Prologue.

Title	Year released	Platform	Sales
Gran Turismo	1997	PlayStation	10,850,000
Gran Turismo 2	1999	PlayStation	9,370,000
Gran Turismo 3: A-Spec	2001	PlayStation 2	14,890,000
Gran Turismo Concept: 2001 Tokyo	2002	PlayStation 2	440,000
Gran Turismo Concept: 2002 Tokyo-Seoul	2002	PlayStation 2	90,000
Gran Turismo Concept: 2002 Tokyo-Geneva	2002	PlayStation 2	1,030,000
Gran Turismo 4 Prologue	2003	PlayStation 2	1,400,000
Gran Turismo 4	2004	PlayStation 2	11,760,000
Gran Turismo 4 Online (test version)	2006	PlayStation 2	-
Gran Turismo HD Concept	2006	PlayStation 3	-
Gran Turismo 5 Prologue	2007	PlayStation 3	5,350,000
Gran Turismo	2009	PlayStation Portable	4,670,000
Gran Turismo 5	2010	PlayStation 3	11,950,000
Gran Turismo 6	2013	PlayStation 3	5,220,000
Gran Turismo Sport	2017	PlayStation 4	12,977,000
Gran Turismo 7	2022	PlayStation 4 PlayStation 5	–

== Films ==
=== Documentary ===
At the Jalopnik Film Festival, Kazunori announced a documentary film covering the past 15 years of the game series up until that point, titled KAZ: Pushing The Virtual Divide. It was released on 22 January 2014 on Hulu.

=== Adaptation ===
In 2013, Sony Pictures announced it was developing a Gran Turismo film with Michael De Luca and Dana Brunetti producing it, with a script by Alex Tse. In 2015, Joseph Kosinski was set to direct the film, with a new screenplay by Jon and Erich Hoeber. By 2018, the Kosinski version was no longer moving forward.

On 26 May 2022, a new iteration of the Gran Turismo film was revealed to be in development, with Neill Blomkamp eyed to direct. On 14 June 2022, it was confirmed that Blomkamp would direct and announced that the film would be released on 11 August 2023, which is intended to be a non-fiction Bildungsroman focusing on GT Academy 2011 graduate Jann Mardenborough and his transition from gamer to race car driver. It was also confirmed that Jason Hall and Zach Baylin would write the screenplay.

Filming began in November 2022 in Hungary, and wrapped in December. The film was released on 25 August, 2023. Asad Qizilbash, Carter Swan, Doug Belgrad and Dana Brunetti are producers. David Harbour stars in the film as Jack Salter, who teaches Mardenborough how to drive a real car. Archie Madekwe plays Jann Mardenborough, with Orlando Bloom as Danny Moore. Darren Barnet plays a racer who is ranked at the top at the GT academy and who is not thrilled to see Mardenborough excel. Djimon Hounsou and Geri Halliwell-Horner play Mardenborough's parents and Daniel Puig as his brother. Josha Stradowski is Mardenborough's rival with Thomas Kretschmann as his father.
