= Gran Turismo HD Concept =

2006 sim racing video game demo

- Cover art (Japanese version)
- Developer: Polyphony Digital
- Publisher: Sony Computer Entertainment
- Designer: Kazunori Yamauchi
- Series: Gran Turismo
- Platform: PlayStation 3
- Release: JP/NA: December 24, 2006; PAL: March 23, 2007
- Genre: Sim racing
- Mode: Single-player

Gran Turismo HD Concept (Note: Japanese: グランツーリスモHDコンセプト, Hepburn: Guran Tsūrisumo HD Konseputo) is a sim racing video game demo developed by Polyphony Digital and published by Sony Computer Entertainment for the PlayStation 3. It is the first installment of the Gran Turismo racing video game series to be released on the console. It was made available as a free download which was released on the PlayStation Store on December 24, 2006. A Blu-ray Disc version, called "Install Disc", was released in Japan in limited quantities in September 2007. The game was intended to be a sneak preview, in the likes of Gran Turismo Concept, preceding the release of a full version title, but the Gran Turismo HD project was canceled and replaced by Gran Turismo 5 Prologue.

== Gameplay ==
Gran Turismo HD Concept includes external view (or rear view) and bumper view, the latter introduces left and right view as seen from the driver's helmet. Left and right views are available with both Sixaxis and steering wheel peripherals although they are not assigned in the wireless controller's default configuration.

As a short title, the Concept version only features ten cars ranging from the Suzuki Cappuccino to the Ferrari 599, available in both stock and tuned version, once unlocked. The game's opening movie focuses on Didier Auriol's 1995 Toyota Celica GT-FOUR WRC and the Lotus Elise 111R. The game features only a single track, The Eiger Nordwand (Eiger north face) which is a newly created mountain pass track based on the Kleine Scheidegg and featuring the Swiss Alps' famous Mönch and Jungfrau peaks. The track is also available in reverse mode once unlocked.

Two play modes are available: Time Trial and Drift Trial. Both modes feature an Internet ranking chart for each continent. Gran Turismo HD Concept is the first game in the franchise to support online ranking. Japanese area ranking ended on September 30, 2007, with the removal of Gran Turismo HD Concept from the local PlayStation Store. The Replay mode is also available, each course's best five records per car in both Time and Drift Trial can be downloaded by users under the form of a replay file.

== Development ==
The Gran Turismo HD project was preceded by the Vision Gran Turismo trailer at E3 2005 (as well as that year's Tokyo Game Show), in lead-up to the reveal of the PlayStation 3 console. The trailer featured upscaled Gran Turismo 4 gameplay with more cars (sixteen instead of the usual six) on the grid.

At the 2006 Tokyo Game Show's opening, Famitsu released details and a screenshot about a new Polyphony Digital project, Gran Turismo HD, scheduled from a December release. Two versions would be simultaneously released, the Blu-ray Disc based "GTHD Premium" (GTHDプレミアム) and the PlayStation Store downloadable "GTHD Classic" (GTHDクラシック). During the show, Polyphony Digital unveiled the first Gran Turismo HD teaser and featured HD renders of five cars: Nismo GT-R R-Tune R1 '99, Honda S2000 '99, TOM'S Castrol Supra JGTC '99, Ford GT '05 and the Ferrari 599 GTB Fiorano '06. The first four cars were available in Gran Turismo 4 but didn't appear in late GTHD trailers, though the Ferrari was featured in Gran Turismo HD Concept. Kazunori Yamauchi confirmed the full version of Gran Turismo HD was scheduled for a December 2007 release in Japan. Among the planned contents he introduced an "iTunes-like" download service and various download packs including additional cars and tracks, advanced AI or car damage, all of which being compatible with the future Gran Turismo 5.

The introduction of Ferrari models in the Gran Turismo series was officially announced by the Series producer Kazunori Yamauchi and Giulio Zambeletti from Ferrari on September 28, 2006 at the Paris Motor Show. It was soon followed by a special trailer "Gran Turismo HD featuring Ferrari GT cars". The first models were supposed to be the Ferrari 599 GTB Fiorano and the Ferrari F430. While the former was available in Gran Turismo HD Concept, the latter was not, but was included in the Gran Turismo 5 Prologue free playable demo among the non selectable NPC cars.

In November 2006, shortly before the release of Gran Turismo HD Concept v2.0, Polyphony Digital director Kazunori Yamauchi officially announced a "revision" in the "product strategy" where "Gran Turismo 5 will be given priority". Polyphony Digital chose to abandon the planned full version named Gran Turismo HD, which was originally scheduled for a 2007 worldwide release to focus on developing Gran Turismo 5 instead. Kazunori Yamauchi stated "Gran Turismo 5 will adopt most of the planned features of Gran Turismo HD", which is confirmed by the two "Gran Turismo x Skyline" trailers based on Gran Turismo 4 replay footages and early Gran Turismo HD Concept artworks or replay footages and including the line "Passage to Gran Turismo 5". "We are hoping to present [...] several Concept versions, each loaded with various experimental features", Kazunori Yamauchi added.

== Reception ==
Gran Turismo HD Concept received "generally favorable" reviews according to review aggregator website Metacritic.

Reception

Aggregate score
Aggregator	Score
Metacritic	82/100

As of June 2007, the game has over 900,000 downloads from the PlayStation Store.

== See also ==
- List of PlayStation Network games
