= Gran Turismo 2 =

1999 sim racing video game

- North American cover art featuring cockpit of the McLaren F1 (although it is not featured in the game)
- Developer: Polyphony Digital
- Publisher: Sony Computer Entertainment
- Director: Kazunori Yamauchi
- Producer: Kazunori Yamauchi
- Designers: Kazunori Yamauchi; Takeshi Yokouchi; Hirotaka Komiyama; Tomokazu Murase
- Programmers: Seiichi Ikiou; Takeshi Yokouchi
- Composers: Masahiro Andoh; Isamu Ohira
- Series: Gran Turismo
- Platform: PlayStation
- Release: JP: December 11, 1999; NA: December 16, 1999; EU: January 28, 2000
- Genre: Sim racing
- Modes: Single-player, multiplayer

Gran Turismo 2 is a 1999 sim racing video game developed by Polyphony Digital and published by Sony Computer Entertainment for the PlayStation. It is the sequel to Gran Turismo, the second installment of the Gran Turismo series, and the first video game to be developed by Polyphony Digital.

Gran Turismo 2 was a critical and commercial success, shipping 1.73 million units in Asia, 3.96 million units in North America, and 3.68 million units in Europe for a total of 9.37 million units as of April 30, 2008, and eventually becoming a Sony Greatest Hits game.

== Gameplay ==
Gran Turismo 2 is a racing simulation video game. The player must maneuver an automobile to compete against computer-controlled drivers on various race tracks. The game uses two different modes: Arcade Mode and Simulation Mode (Gran Turismo Mode in PAL and Japanese versions). In Arcade Mode, the player can freely choose vehicles they wish to use, and can enable damage, while Simulation Mode requires the player to earn driver's licenses, pay for vehicles, and earn trophies in order to unlock new and returning courses. Gran Turismo 2 features nearly 650 automobiles and 27 racing tracks, including rally tracks.

Compared with Gran Turismo, the gameplay, physics and graphics are very similar: the only real noticeable difference in vehicle dynamics was the brakes, which became much less likely to lock up and cause the vehicle to oversteer. The major changes are the vastly expanded number of cars, tracks and races in Simulation Mode. Other differences include that the player can race events separately, if they do not want to enter the whole tournament. The player is no longer able to "qualify" for each race entered.

== Development ==
The Drag Racing mode button as it would have appeared in Arcade Mode, found within the game data

After the unexpected success of Gran Turismo, Polys Entertainment was spun off into Polyphony Digital; lead developer Kazunori Yamauchi planned to make Gran Turismo 2 "an even better product". Ami Blaire (SCEA's marketing director) had high hopes, stating, "the overwhelming and continuing popularity of Gran Turismo clearly positions Gran Turismo 2 to be one of the hottest titles available for the holidays and beyond". Jack Tretton (sales vice president of SCEA) had similar enthusiasm, expecting Gran Turismo 2 to "fly off the shelves faster than the original, continuing the momentum of this incredible franchise".

Upon the game's release, players shortly found various errors and glitches. SCEA did not ignore the outcry, and offered a replacement if any problems occurred. For example, certain cars would appear in the wrong races. This was most significant in the 30-lap Trial Mountain endurance race, where a 680 bhp Vector M12 LM edition may appear despite a 295-horsepower entry restriction, effectively making the race nearly impossible to win. The reason for the maximum completion percentage falling short is due to two races meant strictly for the European version of the game, and two others being dummied out at some point. As a result, the game incorrectly expects 223 events for 100% completion, whereas only 219 are available.

The game's soundtrack features the 1998 song "My Favourite Game" by The Cardigans.

== Reception ==
Reception

Aggregate score
Aggregator	Score
Metacritic	93/100

Review scores
Publication	Score
AllGame	4/5
CNET Gamecenter	10/10
Edge	9/10
Electronic Gaming Monthly	10/10 (Note: Four critics of Electronic Gaming Monthly gave the game all perfect scores each of 10/10.)
EP Daily	10/10
Eurogamer	9/10
Famitsu	34/40
Game Informer	9.5/10
GameFan	(T.R.) 97% 85% (Note: In GameFan's viewpoint of the game, three critics gave it each a score of 74, 91, and 90.)
GameRevolution	A−
GameSpot	8.5/10
IGN	9.8/10
Next Generation	4/5
Official U.S. PlayStation Magazine	5/5

Award
Publication	Award
Edge	Game of the Year

Gran Turismo 2 received "universal acclaim" according to the review aggregation website Metacritic. Dan Egger of NextGen said, "The rushed production of this game botched what could have been a near perfect sequel. As it stands, Gran Turismo 2 is still the best racer ever made. Imagine what it could have been if Sony hadn't bungled the release." In Japan, Famitsu gave it a score of 34 out of 40.

In one review, Air Hendrix of GamePro said, "Sure, better visuals would've been icing on the cake, but Gran Turismo 2000 for the PlayStation 2 will make amends there. In the meantime, you can climb behind the wheel of GT2—it's another awesome ride." (Note: GamePro gave the game 3/5 for graphics, 4.5/5 for sound, and two 5/5 scores for control and fun factor in one review.) In another review, Uncle Dust said, "Even though Gran Turismo 2 shows its age (and its system's age) and Rally Mode doesn't live up to the rest of the game, GT2 is still as close as you can get to the real thing and always worth the drive." (Note: GamePro gave the game 4/5 for graphics, two 4.5/5 scores for sound and fun factor, and 5/5 for control in another review.)

Upon release, the game sold 815,430 units in Japan during its first week on sale. In the UK, it sold 130,000 units and grossed £4.3 million or $6,506,000 (equivalent to $12,200,000 in 2025) in its first weekend, surpassing The Legend of Zelda: Ocarina of Time to become the UK's fastest-selling title, and it sold about 250,000 units in its first week. It was a bestseller for two months in Japan and the UK. In the U.S., it sold more than 1 million units within six weeks, and had sold 3 million units by early 2001. In total, it has sold 9.37 million units worldwide. Official UK PlayStation Magazine listed the game as the 4th best of all time. It also received a "Double Platinum" sales award from the Entertainment and Leisure Software Publishers Association (ELSPA), indicating sales of at least 600,000 units in the UK.

Gran Turismo 2 was a finalist for "Console Game of the Year", "Console Racing Game of the Year" and "Outstanding Achievement in Game Design" during the 3rd Annual Interactive Achievement Awards.
