= Advan Racing =

1998 video game

- Developer: Atlus
- Publisher: Atlus
- Platform: PlayStation
- Release: JP: November 19, 1998
- Genre: Sim racing
- Modes: Single-player, multiplayer

Advan Racing is a 1998 racing video game developed and published by Atlus for the PlayStation. It was released only in Japan.

== Gameplay ==
Start of a race

Advan Racing is a game that simulates auto racing. It features two primary modes: a quick race option and a career mode known as Advan Racing, where the player can earn prize money to purchase better cars. Races can occur at different times of the day and under a variety of weather conditions, including foggy weather. The game offers four distinct camera perspectives, including a cockpit view. The player can select from more than 70 different vehicles, such as the Nissan Micra and a Toyota touring car. The multiplayer mode allows for racing duels in a split-screen format. The information mode features videos about the history of Advan racing in Japan.

== Reception ==
Reception

Review scores
Publication	Score
Consoles +	78%
Fun Generation	7/10
Mega Fun	84%
PSX Extreme	4/10

In previews, Advan Racing was often compared to Gran Turismo (1997).

Mega Fun stated that the game ranks among the finest in its genre, and serves as a genuine alternative to TOCA 2. The opponents' artificial intelligence (AI) was noted as clever and the graphic effects were praised as authentic, although it was said that the game does exhibit some graphical glitches. PSX Extreme said the game is an unsuccessful mix of Gran Turismo and TOCA. A second reviewer liked the game slightly more and highlighted the quality of the opponent AI. Consoles + liked the number of vehicles and the AI of the opponents but did not recommend the game if one already owns either Gran Turismo, Need for Speed III, or Ridge Racer Type 4. Fun Generation said that although Advan Racing does not offer any improvements over Gran Turismo, it is still a good title in its own regard.
