= Gran Turismo 6 =

2013 video game

- European cover art
- Developer: Polyphony Digital
- Publisher: Sony Computer Entertainment
- Director: Kazunori Yamauchi
- Producer: Kazunori Yamauchi
- Programmer: Yuji Yasuhara
- Composer: Daiki Kasho
- Series: Gran Turismo
- Platform: PlayStation 3
- Release: WW: December 6, 2013
- Genre: Racing simulation
- Modes: Single-player, multiplayer

Gran Turismo 6 is a 2013 racing simulation video game developed by Polyphony Digital and published by Sony Computer Entertainment for the PlayStation 3. It is the sixth main installment and the eleventh overall in the Gran Turismo series. The game was released worldwide on December 6, 2013. Gran Turismo 6 received a positive reception and was a financial success. New features included the addition of more cars and tracks, improvements to the car customization options, and partnerships with the Goodwood Festival of Speed, the Ayrton Senna Institute, the FIA, and NASCAR. Gran Turismo 6 is the first game to feature officially FIA-certified content.

== Development ==
In November 2011, the Gran Turismo series creator, Kazunori Yamauchi, announced that he and his team at Polyphony Digital were working on Gran Turismo 6. In March 2012, employees were observed on-site at Mount Panorama in Bathurst, New South Wales, Australia, photographing and scanning the track. They revealed that Mount Panorama would be included in Gran Turismo 6, making it the first Australian race track featured in the series.

In February 2013, Michael Denny, senior vice president of Sony Computer Entertainment Europe, stated that Gran Turismo 6 would remain a PlayStation 3 title, despite the unveiling of the PlayStation 4.

Gran Turismo 6 was announced on May 15, 2013, during a celebration of the 15th anniversary of Gran Turismo hosted by Sony Computer Entertainment Europe at Silverstone Circuit in the United Kingdom. At the official announcement, Kazunori Yamauchi stated that Gran Turismo 6 would feature 71 layouts across 33 tracks, 1,200 cars, a more flexible rendering engine that incorporates adaptive tessellation, and a simplified user interface with faster loading times. An early build of Gran Turismo 6's updated physics was demonstrated to the public when GT Academy 2013 was released on the PlayStation Store on July 2 of the same year.

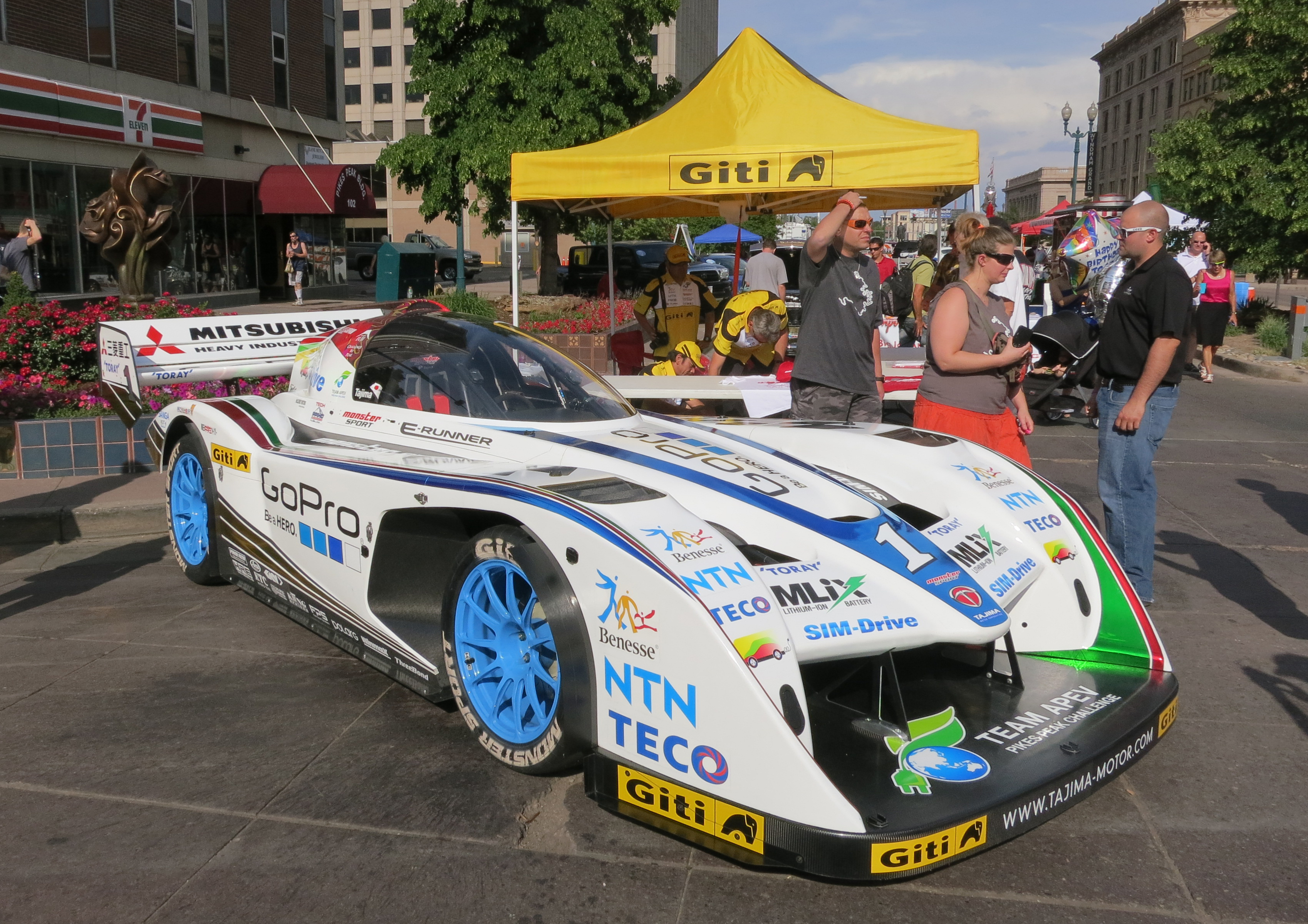
The Monster Tajima E-Runner Pikes Peak Special is one of the new electric cars in the game.

The developers announced that the Goodwood Festival of Speed hill climb course would be included in the game. The 1.16-mile strip of road that runs through the grounds of the Earl of March's family home hosts the annual Festival of Speed, where a variety of cars from throughout motorsport and the automobile industry attempt to set their best times along the narrow course. This inspired the game developers to base a track there due to the wide variety of vehicles that use the hill climb in front of 185,000 spectators. Yamauchi stated, "I have always been a huge admirer of the Festival of Speed and what Lord March has achieved. I love the incredible range of cars on display – from the priceless, rare, and exotic to the latest family hatchbacks and full-on racing cars. I love the challenge of the Hill Climb and the rally stage. Goodwood represents every type of motoring and motorsport, which very much mirrors what we aim to achieve with Gran Turismo, so it is very special that we have forged this partnership. There will be no better feedback than that provided by the Goodwood fans to tell me if we are heading in the right direction with Gran Turismo 6!" A demo of GT6 was made available at the Festival, which gave spectators a chance to challenge Nick Heidfeld's 41.6-second course record set in 1999 in a Formula 1 car.

At the 2013 Gamescom in August, it was revealed that Brands Hatch would be coming to Gran Turismo, alongside the return of Apricot Hill Raceway, a fan-favorite fictional track that was absent in Gran Turismo 5. Cars such as the Pagani Huayra, Fisker Karma, Chevrolet Corvette Stingray C7, and BMW Z8 were announced, as well as the Aston Martin One-77, Audi R18, KTM X-Bow, and the 1971 Lunar Roving Vehicle (from the Apollo 15 mission). Nissan's DeltaWing was originally announced for the game but was briefly removed due to potential licensing issues. This decision was reversed on December 2, with the car returning in its 2012 and 2013 guises, alongside the last-minute additions of the Honda NSX Concept (which was available as both an Acura and a Honda) and the 2008 World Rally Championship cars from Gran Turismo 5.

The worldwide launch event was held in Spain at Ronda and the nearby Circuito Ascari in December 2013; the city named a street after series creator Yamauchi during the event in gratitude for the public exposure.

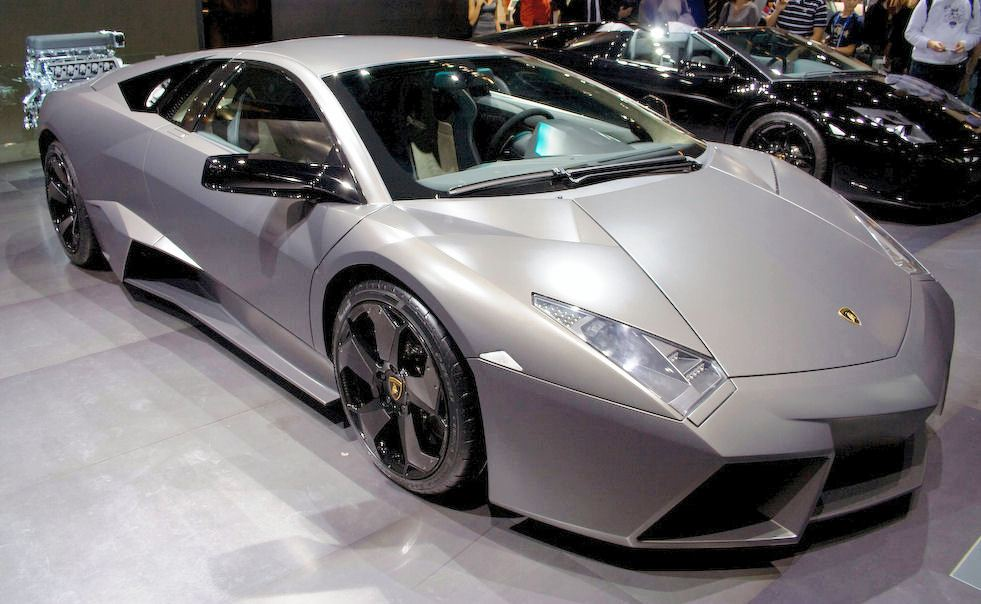
The Lamborghini Reventón was introduced in this game.

Polyphony helped design Toyota's FT-1 concept car by first modeling the car in Gran Turismo 5 and later in Gran Turismo 6. This approach allowed the car designers to visualize the vehicle in motion and effectively sell the concept to Toyota's management. The car was released as a free download for Gran Turismo 6 alongside other Vision Gran Turismo cars on January 14.

F1 drivers Sebastian Vettel and Bruno Senna served as test drivers for the game.

The online servers for Gran Turismo 6 were shut down on March 28, 2018. All downloadable content and digital versions of the game could no longer be purchased directly from Sony's PlayStation Store after this date.

== Features ==
The game developers announced a long-term partnership with the Ayrton Senna Institute in October 2013, wherein a percentage of profits from the sale of the game would be donated to the organization, which promotes and provides education to impoverished communities in Brazil. A free update in May 2014 introduced a new feature called "Ayrton Senna Tribute," which followed the motor racing career of Ayrton Senna. The update also included the iconic Lotus 97T, which Senna drove during the 1985 Formula One season.

The game features 30 tracks and 1,200 cars to choose from. Among the new circuits in the series are Willow Springs International Motorsports Park, Ascari Race Resort, and several tracks based in a sports stadium, in addition to multiple tracks located in the Matterhorn, including one near Riffelsee.

In addition to some tracks featuring variable weather and time of day, there is also a dynamic celestial sphere, ensuring that stars in the night sky are positioned accurately. Players can even drive at Hadley Rille on the moon using the Lunar Rover.

The Top Gear test track, which appeared in Gran Turismo 5, does not return in the game due to the show's partnership with the Forza Motorsport franchise for Xbox consoles.

=== Vision Gran Turismo ===
To commemorate the 15th anniversary of the series, Gran Turismo 6 features "Vision Gran Turismo" (a name reused from an early GT5 trailer), a special project with concept cars designed for the game by leading automobile companies, as well as sportswear brands Air Jordan and Nike, and automobile design firms such as Zagato.

=== Downloadable content ===
Though no downloadable content (DLC) packs have been released for sale, several free cars have been made available after the launch of Gran Turismo 6 through updates. These include the BMW M4, the Toyota FT-1 concept, and Mario Andretti's 1948 Hudson stock car.

==== Course maker ====
On September 30, 2015, a level editor app titled Track Path Editor was released on Apple's App Store and Android's Google Play. This app allowed players to design tracks and upload them to play on the PlayStation 3. The app supported KML and GPX files, photo/bitmap image importing, and GPS tracing of real-life driving routes. Players could use imported tracks in arcade mode races, time trials, and share them online. The app received positive reviews from journalists. However, the editor was removed from the App Store at the same time the online servers were shut down.

=== Multiple screens ===
The game supports up to six different views that can be presented on six or more PS3 consoles. Two left views, two right views, server view (front with dials), and a front view without any dials all can be duplicated on an extra PS3 console if they are on the same LAN.

== Reception ==
Reception

Aggregate score
Aggregator	Score
Metacritic	81/100

Review scores
Publication	Score
Destructoid	9.0/10
Eurogamer	9/10
Famitsu	36/40
GamesRadar+	4.5/5
IGN	8.0/10
Polygon	9.0/10
Hardcore Gamer	4/5
The Daily Telegraph	100%

Awards
Publication	Award
Eurogamer	Top 50 best games of the year
PlayStation LifeStyle	Racing game of the year
IGN	Best racing game
GameTrailers	Best racing game
G4TV	Best graphics (bronze)
G4TV	Best audio (bronze)
3GEM	Best PS3 game (runner up)
PSXExtreme	Most Underrated game
Eurogamer	Pick of 2013

=== Critical ===
Gran Turismo 6 received "generally favorable" reviews, according to review aggregator Metacritic. It was mainly praised for its more open focus on realism and an even bigger collection of cars, but criticism emphasized a lack of more improvement, bugs and glitches at launch, and a bigger focus on online play and microtransactions. Eurogamer praised the "vast, sprawling compendium of cars" and the "staggering tracklist," with GamesRadar praising the graphics and realism. Polygon liked the variety of gameplay, while IGN said it was "a marked improvement on GT5." Hardcore Gamer commented that it was "surprisingly addictive" with "huge lasting appeal," and "arguably remains the gold standard of the genre." When Destructoid made a head-to-head comparison with the next-generation title Forza 5, Gran Turismo came out on top by a wide margin. When USGamer carried out a similar 3-way test, they concluded that "I've had both these games for weeks, but it's Gran Turismo 6 that's keeping me up late at night. Much as I like Forza 5, Gran Turismo just has more going for it... The way Gran Turismo articulates different car types and handling characteristics is phenomenal, and its sheer variety of cars, tracks, racing formats and minigame challenges makes it hugely entertaining to play."

During the 17th Annual D.I.C.E. Awards, the Academy of Interactive Arts & Sciences nominated Gran Turismo 6 for "Racing Game of the Year."

=== Commercial ===
For the week of launch in Japan, after two days of sales, Gran Turismo 6 had 204,784 physical sales - the game in second place had 117,432 sales for the whole week. These sales helped almost to double the sales of the PS3 console compared to the previous week. Among the Famitsu 2013 Top 100, a listing of the top 100 Japanese retail software sales for the year of 2013 from data collected by Famitsu's parent company Enterbrain, the game ranked number 24, with 282,686 physical retail sales within Japan. Gran Turismo 6 was the 7th best selling game of 2015 on the PlayStation Store. In December 2014, the game won the gold award for sales of half a million in Japan.

The game was the bestseller in France, Germany, Norway, Finland and New Zealand, number 2 in Australia and Italy, number 3 in the UK, Sweden, Denmark and Greece, and number 4 in Spain and South Africa. It was the 42nd highest selling game of 2013 across all formats in the UK, with it also being the biggest selling single-format racing title of the year. The game initially fared less well in North America, just making the top ten.

== Celebrity endorsements ==
Four-time Formula One world champion Sebastian Vettel appears in the game, as well as Mario Andretti's 1948 Hudson Hornet. NASCAR champion Matt Kenseth drives one of the new cars in the game. The game also features replica helmets and coveralls worn by drivers such as Jeff Gordon, Tony Stewart, Ayrton Senna, Jimmie Johnson, Petter Solberg, and Mikko Hirvonen. Jay Leno helped the producers to include his 1000-horsepower Oldsmobile Toronado in the game.
