= Kazunori Yamauchi =

Japanese game designer and racing driver

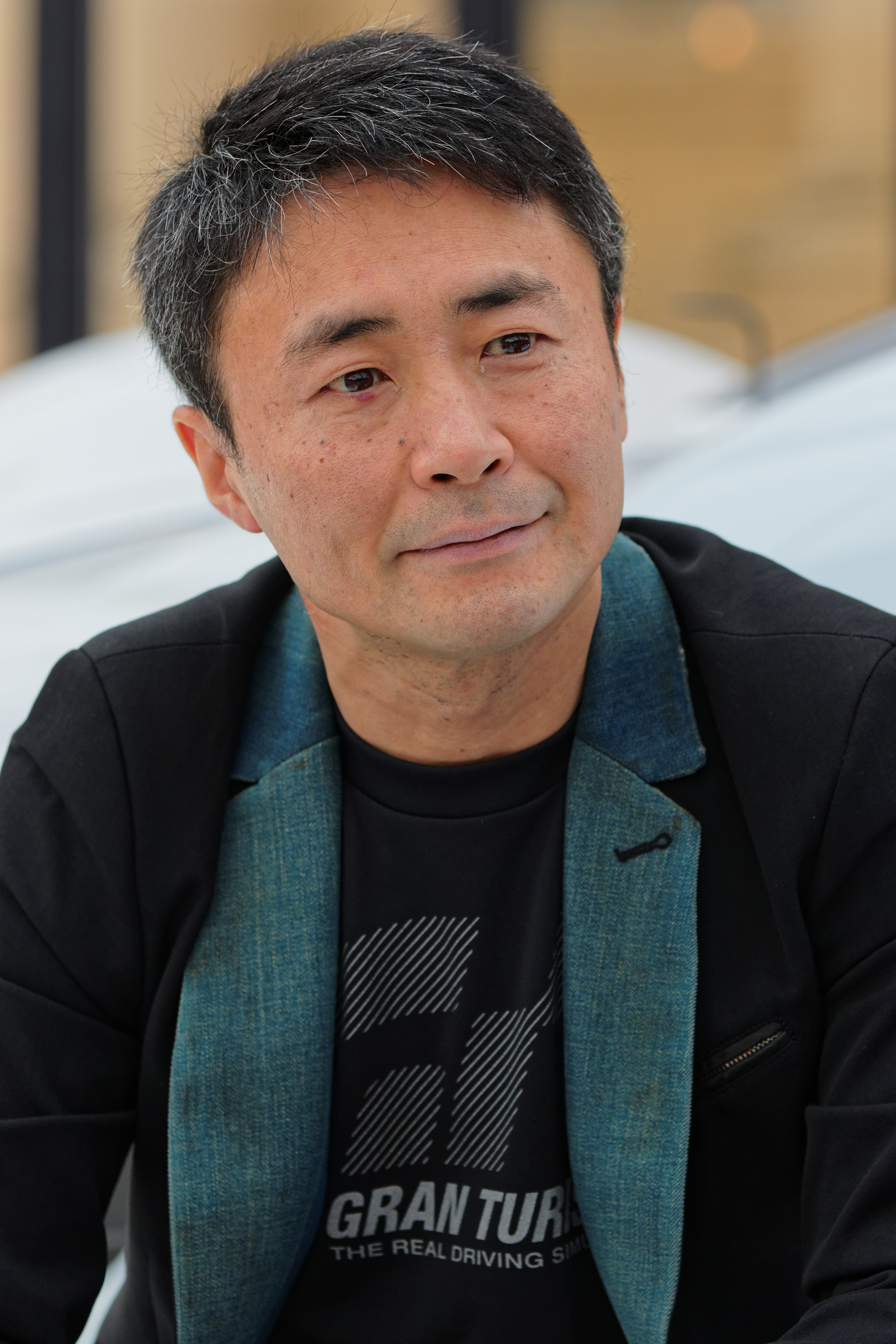
- Yamauchi at the 30th International Automobile Festival in Paris, in 2015
- Born: August 5, 1967 (age 59); Kashiwa, Chiba, Japan
- Occupations: Game designer; professional racing driver
- Employer: Sony Interactive Entertainment
- Notable work: Gran Turismo series

Kazunori Yamauchi (山内 一典, Yamauchi Kazunori; born August 5, 1967), nicknamed "Kaz", is a Japanese game designer for Sony Interactive Entertainment and racing driver. He is the CEO of Polyphony Digital and producer of the Gran Turismo sim racing series.

== Polyphony Digital ==
He became the president of Polyphony Digital after designing his first game Motor Toon Grand Prix, a cartoon-inspired racing title similar to Mario Kart. Motor Toon Grand Prix later spawned a sequel, Motor Toon Grand Prix 2, which was the only game in the franchise released outside Japan. Since then, Yamauchi has fulfilled his dream of creating realistic driving simulators with his massively successful Gran Turismo series. He has also expressed interest in broadening out to other game genres; in 1999 Polyphony Digital released Omega Boost, a shoot 'em up title set in space, which has since proven to be Yamauchi's only foray outside of racing game development.

As a result of Gran Turismo's success, Yamauchi has become an important figure in the worldwide automotive industry. Polyphony Digital worked with Nissan to design the multifunction display (which relays various pieces of car data to the driver, including G-Force generated, torque distribution and lap times) found in the R35 GT-R. The car, as well as the display itself, appear in many games in his franchise, such as Gran Turismo 5 Prologue, Gran Turismo 5, Gran Turismo 6 and a newer, facelifted version of the car in Gran Turismo Sport and Gran Turismo 7. He was given a Nissan GT-R for his contribution.

On a video included with Gran Turismo 5 Prologue, Yamauchi remarked his favorite car design is the Ford GT and he owns two in real life.

A documentary focusing on Gran Turismo and Yamauchi called Kaz: Pushing the Virtual Divide, was released on January 22, 2014 on Hulu.

== Racing career ==
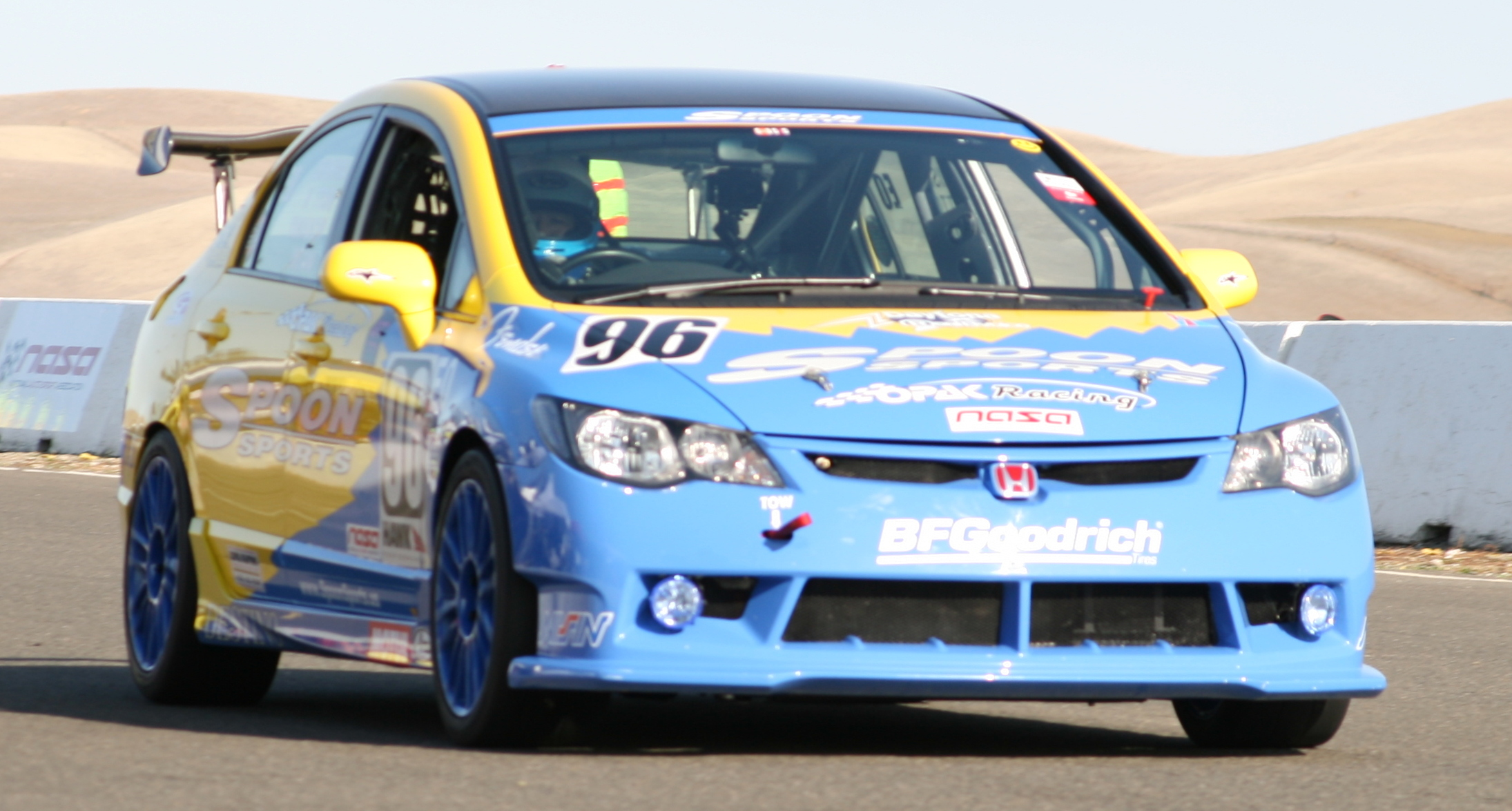
The Spoon Sports Honda Civic Type R driven by Yamauchi at the 25 Hours of Thunderhill in 2009

On August 29, 2009, Yamauchi joined the World Car Awards team for the eighth race of the VLN series at the Nürburgring, piloting an SP8-class Lexus IS-F. He clocked a fastest lap of 10 minutes 9 seconds, which was the best in the team, and their team recorded a class win. He returned to the Nürburgring track as one of the four drivers of Team World Car Award participating in the 2010 24 Hours of Nürburgring and finished in 4th place in the SP8 class.

Yamauchi competed as one of the four drivers of the No. 96 Spoon Sports FD2 Honda Civic Type R during the 25 Hours of Thunderhill in December 2009, which was his first time driving in a road course in the United States. His co-drivers included 1996 JTCC champion Naoki Hattori and Spoon founder Tatsuru Ichisima. The team had to spend almost an hour in the pits during the race as they had to modify their exhaust to comply with noise regulations and incurred a penalty for improper fueling. Despite this, the car ran without issues, and after completing 617 laps, finished 7th out of 17 cars in its class and 23rd overall out of 66 cars.

Yamauchi took part in the 2011 24 Hours of Nürburgring as one of the four drivers of the No. 71 Schulze Motorsport Nissan GT-R N24. The team finished the race in 36th place overall, achieving a victory in the SP8T class after overcoming several technical problems, and beating competition from drivers including Johnny Herbert and Mark Blundell.

For the 2012 24 Hours of Nürburgring, Yamauchi returned to Nissan, driving the No. 123 GT-R with Lucas Ordóñez. He finished 1st in the SP8T class, and 30th overall, though the SP8T class that year only consisted of two cars, both of which were Nissan GT-Rs.

Yamauchi joined the SP9 class for the 2013 24 Hours of Nürburgring, driving Schulze Motorsport's Nissan GT-R Nismo GT3. The team managed to lead the first qualifying session overall for over 40 minutes, but multiple reliability problems in the race put them down to 165th place overall at one point. They recovered to 135th position overall at the checkered flag.

For the 2014 24 Hours of Nürburgring, Yamauchi again drove Schulze Motorsport's Nissan GT-R Nismo GT3 with Jordan Tresson, Tobias and Michael Schulze. The team were able to have a much cleaner race than in the previous year, and impressively finished 14th overall out of 165 cars.

The 2016 Nürburgring 24 Hour race saw Yamauchi make the switch from Nissan to BMW, where he piloted the No. 101 Walkenhorst Motorsport M6 GT3, and finished 22nd overall.

== Racing record ==
=== 25 Hours of Thunderhill results ===
Year	Team	Co-Drivers	Car	Class	Laps	Pos.	Class Pos.
2009	(Japan) Spoon Sports	(Japan) Naoki Hattori (Japan) Tatsuru Ichishima (Japan) Sam Mitani	Honda Civic Type R (FD2)	E0	617	23rd	7th

=== 24 Hours of Nürburgring results ===
Year	Team	Co-Drivers	Car	Class	Laps	Pos.	Class Pos.
2010	(Germany) Team World Car Awards	(Japan) Hideshi Matsuda (Australia) Peter Lyon (United Kingdom) Owen Mildenhall	Lexus IS F	SP8	127	59th	4th
2011	(Germany) Schulze Motorsport	(Germany) Tobias Schulze (Germany) Michael Schulze (Japan) Yasuyoshi Yamamoto	Nissan GT-R	SP8T	134	36th	1st
2012	(Germany) Team GT Academy	(Spain) Lucas Ordóñez (Germany) Tobias Schulze (Japan) Yasukichi Yamamoto	Nissan GT-R	SP8T	136	30th	1st
2013	(Germany) Schulze Motorsport	(Germany) Tobias Schulze (Germany) Michael Schulze (Germany) Michael Krumm	Nissan GT-R Nismo GT3	SP9	48	135th	22nd
2014	(Germany) Schulze Motorsport	(Germany) Tobias Schulze (Germany) Michael Schulze (France) Jordan Tresson	Nissan GT-R Nismo GT3	SP9	147	14th	11th
2016	(Germany) Walkenhorst Motorsport	(Finland) Mathias Henkola (New Zealand) George Richardson (Germany) Max Sandritter	BMW M6 GT3	SP9	121	22nd	18th

== Honors ==
In 2013, Yamauchi had a street named in honor of him in the city of Ronda. Named "Paseo de Kazunori Yamauchi", the street snakes around the Parador de Ronda. According to Ronda's city mayor Maria de la Paz Fernandez Lobato, "There is no doubt that his work has a huge cultural resonance with people today. He has driven the racing game genre to new levels of realism and his creations are as much art as technology. Ronda’s association with Gran Turismo is also a reflection that our ancient city is a modern, vibrant place to live and very much part of the 21st century."

In 2015, Yamauchi was awarded the "Grand Prize of Creativity" at the 30th International Automobile Festival in Paris, for his contributions to the automotive industry.

In 2017, Yamauchi was awarded an honorary degree in vehicle engineering from University of Modena and Reggio Emilia.

Yamauchi made a cameo in the 2023 film Gran Turismo, playing a sushi chef, with actor Takehiro Hira portraying a fictional version of the former.
