= Logitech Driving Force GT =

Racing wheel peripheral

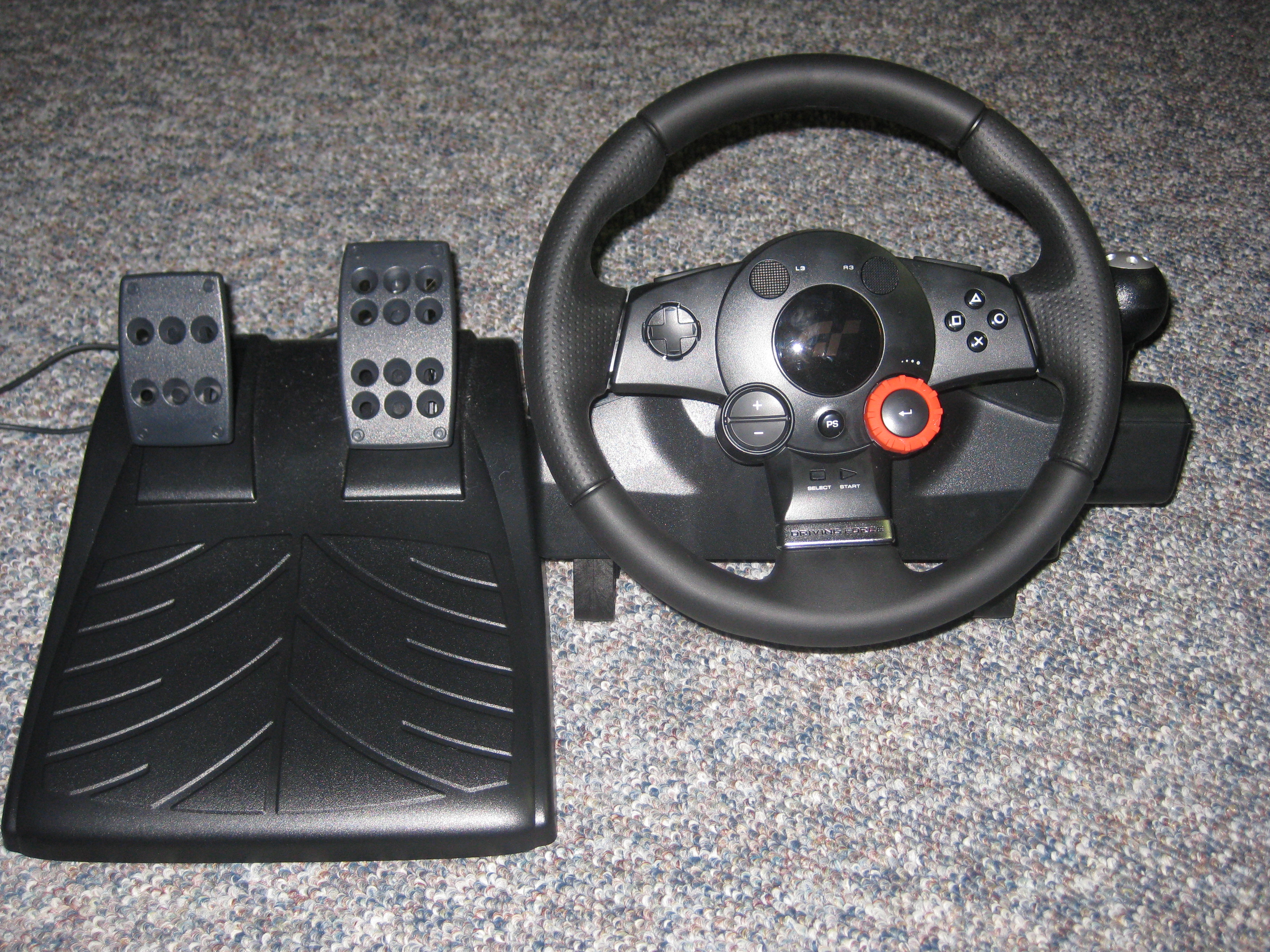
- Manufacturer: Logitech
- Type: Racing wheel
- Generation: Seventh generation
- Released: December 13, 2007
- Input: 8× Pressure-sensitive buttons; Pressure-sensitive D-pad; 3× Digital buttons; Manual sequential shifters; 900° 28 cm diameter steering wheel; Throttle and brake pedals
- Connectivity: USB 2.0
- Power: Power cord
- Predecessor: Driving Force EX

The Logitech Driving Force GT is a racing wheel peripheral designed for racing games on the PlayStation 2, PlayStation 3, and Microsoft Windows and Linux PCs. It is manufactured and distributed by Logitech International S.A of Romanel-sur-Morges, Switzerland. The wheel was released on December 13, 2007.

Developed in conjunction with Polyphony Digital, first introduced at the 2007 Tokyo Game Show, and intended for use with Gran Turismo 5 Prologue, Gran Turismo 5, and all PlayStation 3 auto racing games, the Driving Force GT is the fifth entry in the company's Driving Force series of game controllers and is the official steering wheel of the Gran Turismo game franchise.

Features include 900° steering with force feedback via a full-size wheel, full-size throttle and brake pedals, standard PlayStation face buttons, a D-pad, L3 and R3 buttons, both sets of shoulder buttons, Start and Select buttons, and a PS button.

It features controls for real-time adjustment of both brake bias and traction control settings when playing Gran Turismo 5. Users may select gears either via a pair of button-shifters located on the back of the steering wheel (in place of Formula One-style paddle shifters) or sequentially on the "dashboard" to the right of the wheel. The force feedback is driven by the game's physics engine and simulates real-time "road feel".

Use with Microsoft Windows requires the Logitech Gaming Software device driver.

== See also ==
- Gran Turismo official steering wheel
- Logitech G25
- Logitech G27
- PlayStation 3 accessories
- Xbox 360 Wireless Racing Wheel
- Wii Wheel
