= Logitech G27 =

Electronic steering wheel

- Manufacturer: Logitech
- Type: Steering wheel controller
- Generation: Seventh generation era
- Lifespan: 2010–15
- Input: Pressure sensitive D-Pad; 14× Digital buttons; Manual H-Pattern and Paddle Shifters; 900° steering angle; Brake, Clutch and Accelerator pedals
- Connectivity: USB
- Predecessor: Logitech G25
- Successor: Logitech G29 and Logitech G920

The Logitech G27 is a racing wheel made by Logitech. It supports PlayStation 3, PlayStation 2 and PC. It replaced the Logitech G25 in 2010, with some new features including the use of helical gearing instead of the previous straight gears used on the G25. The G27 was discontinued in December 2015 and replaced with the newer G29 and G920 models.

== Specifications ==
It features:

- A wheel:
  - 270 mm, leather-wrapped steering wheel
  - Range of rotation adjustable up to 900 degrees
  - 2 force feedback motors
  - One set of gears between motors and wheel, including an anti-backlash design
  - 2 paddle shifters
  - 6 buttons
  - Dual-motor force feedback with helical gears that produces less noise than the G25, and provides better steering response
- A set of stainless steel pedals, including:
  - Accelerator. (light spring)
  - Brake (heavy spring)
  - Clutch (medium spring)
  - A carpet grip which keeps the pedals in position while in use
- A shifter unit:
  - 8 buttons
  - 1 D-pad
  - A gear stick with a six-speed 'H' pattern gearbox. Reverse is selected by pressing down and changing to sixth
  - Unlike the superseded Logitech G25, the shifter unit does not include a selector to switch to sequential up-down mode, only allowing six-speed mode to be used. The shift click has improved though and gives less noise

== Compatibility ==
- PlayStation 3
- PlayStation 2
- PC

== See also ==
- Logitech 'G' series

- Logitech G25

- Steering wheel
- Logitech Driving Force Pro
- Racing game
- Sim racing
