= Logitech G29 =

Racing steering wheel from Logitech

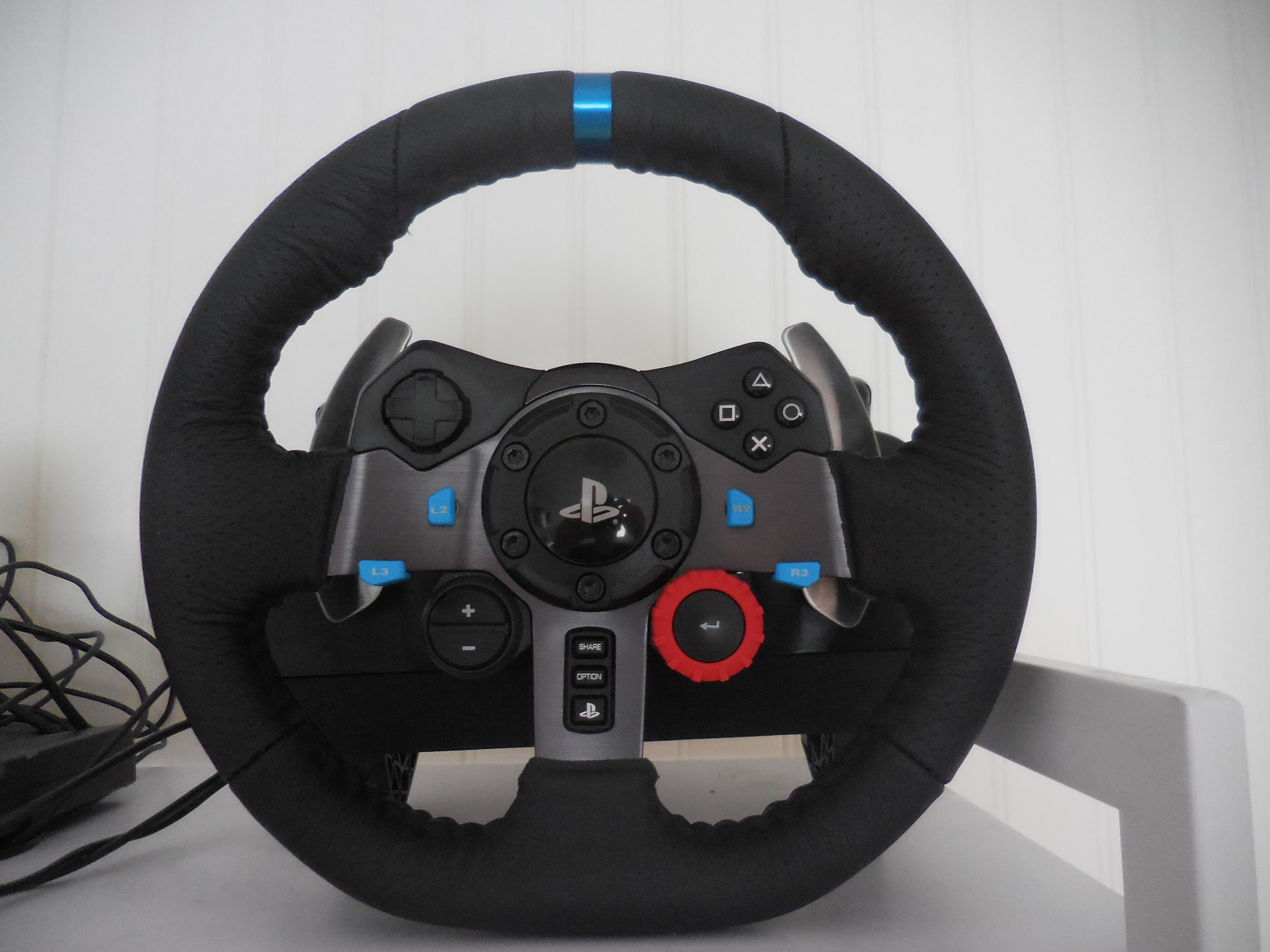
- Manufacturer: Logitech
- Type: Steering wheel controller
- Generation: Eighth generation era
- Lifespan: 2015–present
- Connectivity: USB
- Predecessor: Logitech G27
- Successor: Logitech G92

The Logitech G29 is a racing wheel made by Logitech. It supports PlayStation 5, PlayStation 4, PlayStation 3 and PC. The Logitech G920 is compatible with the Xbox Series X and Series S, Xbox One and PC, with different buttons and logos. It replaced the Logitech G27 in 2015, but retains the internal design and technical specifications.The Logitech G29 was released in July 2015 as the replacement for the Logitech G27. Although Logitech released a successor, the Logitech G923, in August 2020, the G29 remains in production and available for retail As of 2026. They both share a similar exterior design.

The wheel features dual-motor force feedback and RPM shift indicator LEDs, is supplied with a pedal set (accelerator, brake and clutch) and an optional six-speed 'H pattern' gear shifter is available separately.

Users have commonly reported problems with the break pedal being extremely stiff and uncomfortable to use, with some users making modifications to the device to make it easier to use.

A common issue users also report is the force feedback being loud. Although this doesn't affect performance with the device.

As of 2026, the G29 wheel and pedals retail at £189.00/$251.24 and the optional shifter is £39.99/$53.15. (Converted, may not be retail accurate)

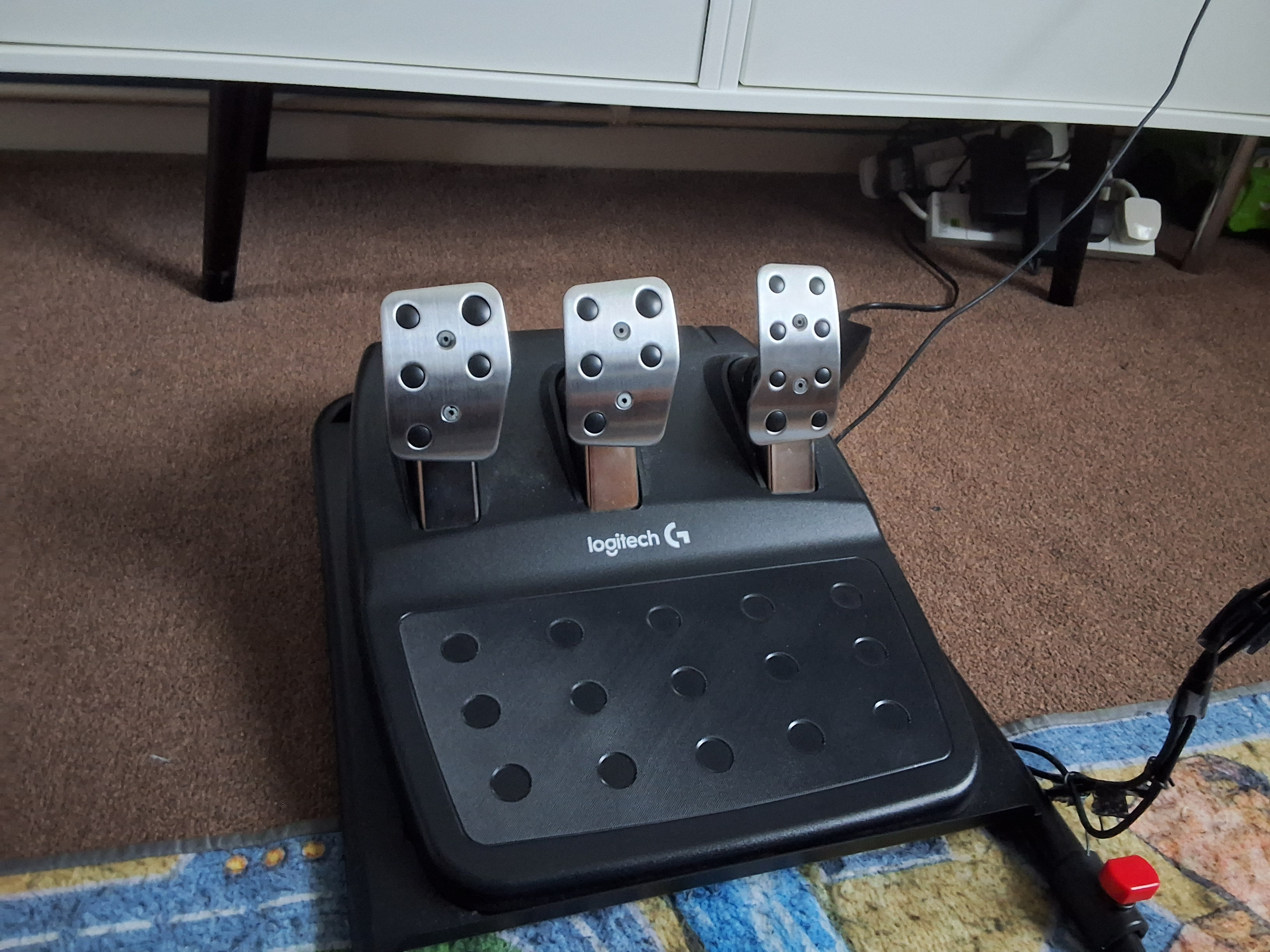
Logitech Pedals with an additional clutch pedal.

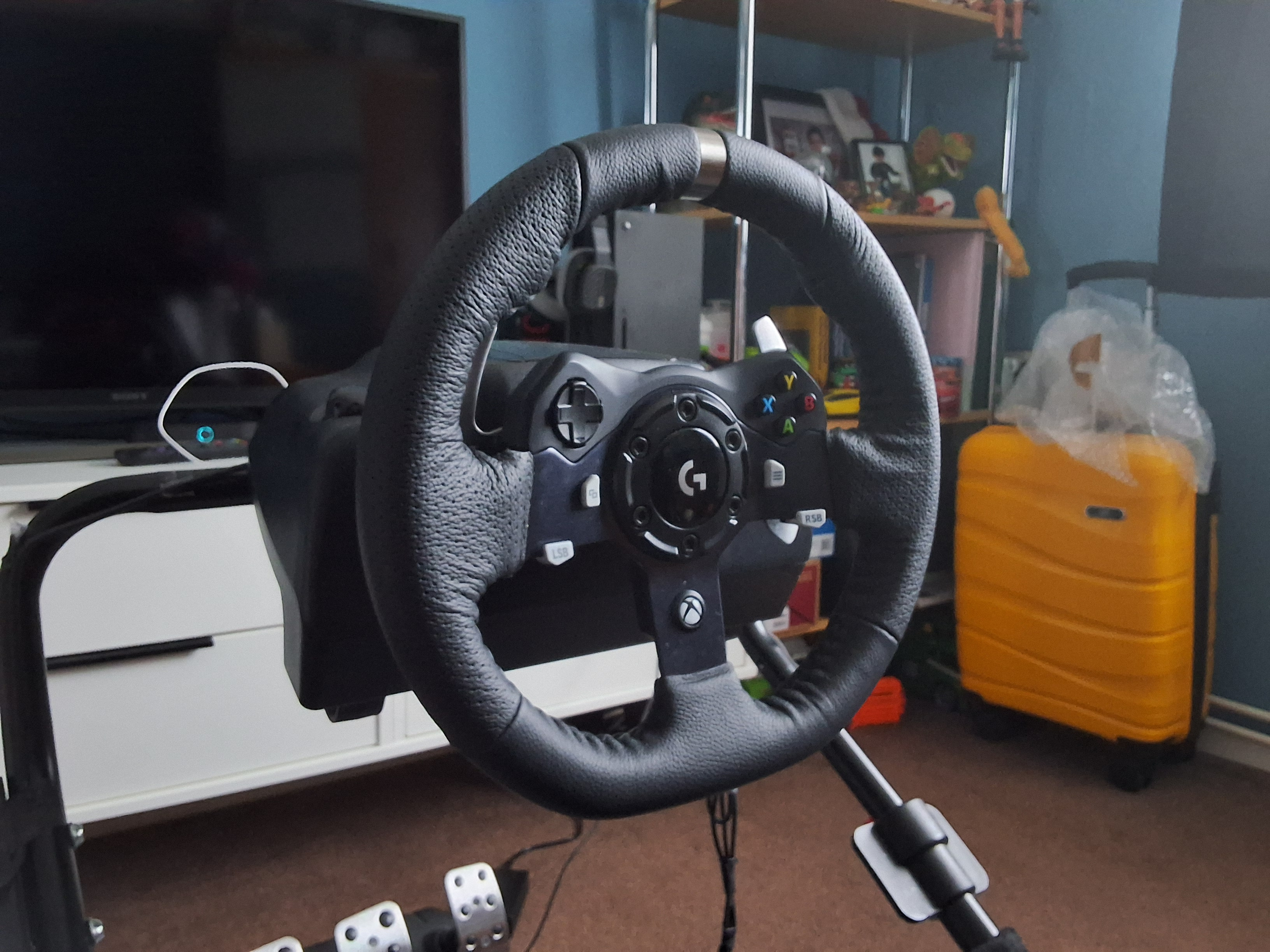
G920 Gear Driven Wheel

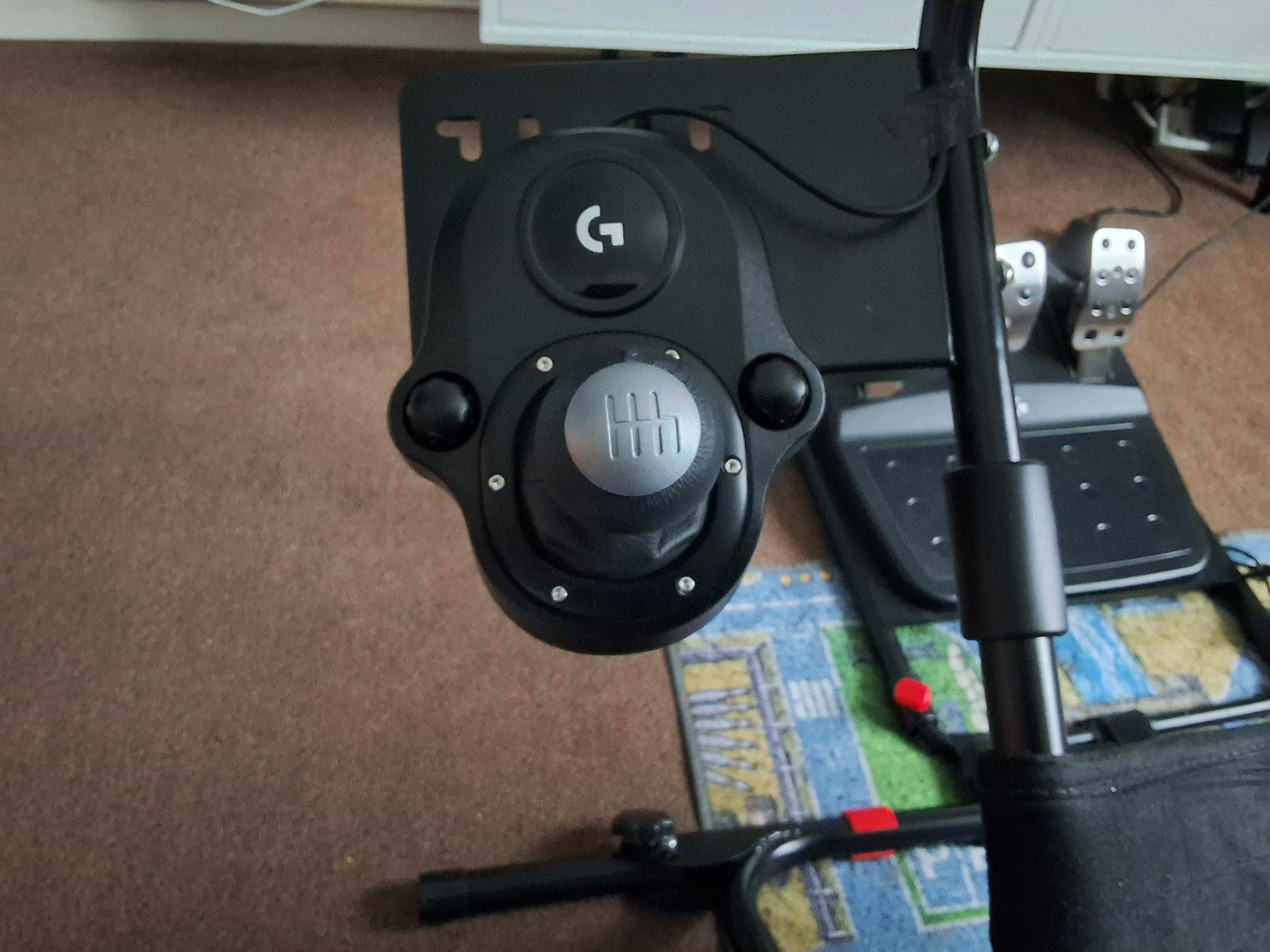
A 6 speed shifter with a push down to 6 gear reverse.

== Specifications ==
It features:

- A leather-wrapped steering wheel:
  - Range of rotation adjustable up to 900°
  - Dual-Motor Force Feedback
  - 2 metal paddle shifters
  - 18 buttons
- A set of stainless steel pedals, including:
  - Accelerator. (light spring)
  - Brake (heavy spring)
  - Clutch (medium spring)
  - A spiked carpet grip which keeps the pedals in position while in use
- A shifter unit (purchased separately):
  - A gear stick with a six-speed 'H' pattern gearbox. Reverse is selected by pressing down and changing to sixth
  - Unlike previous models (Logitech G25, Logitech G27) the G29 shifter contains no buttons at all
