= Hyundai Clix =

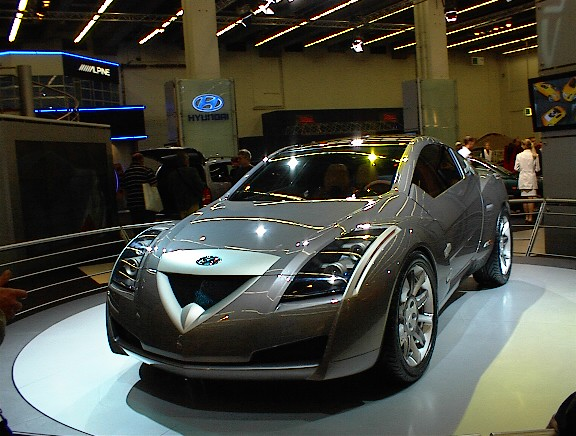

Overview
- Manufacturer: Hyundai Motor Company
- Production: 2001 (Concept car)

Body and chassis
- Class: Concept car

Powertrain
- Engine: 2.2 L I4
- Transmission: 6-speed sequential manual

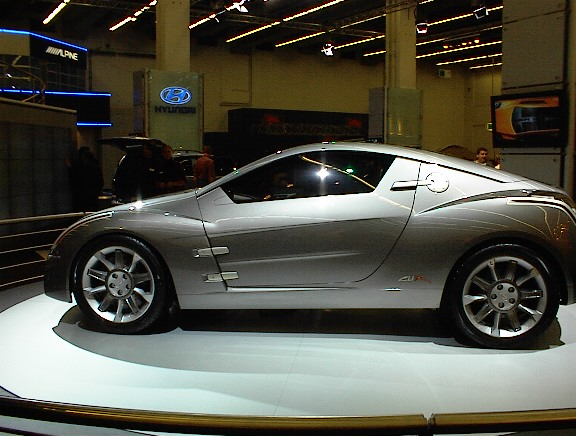
Side view

The Hyundai Clix was a concept car made by the Hyundai Motor Company in 2001. It was unveiled at the Frankfurt Motor Show in 2001. It has characteristics of both a coupe and a pickup SUV. It had a completely transparent, collapsible roof which allowed it to be configured in a number of ways for different situations.

== In media ==
The Hyundai Clix appears as a playable vehicle in Gran Turismo 4, Gran Turismo PSP, Gran Turismo 5 and Gran Turismo 6.
