= Gran Turismo official steering wheel =

Series of video game racing wheel add-ons

The Gran Turismo official steering wheels (such as the GT FORCE or Driving Force, see the trademark symbols difference) are a series of racing wheels designed by Logitech (a.k.a. Logicool in Japan) in collaboration with Polyphony Digital. These racing games controllers are designed to be used with the PlayStation 2 and PlayStation 3 systems but later models can be used on PC as well due to their USB connection. The GT Force is the central part of a driving simulation cockpit installation. Official kits are co-designed and released in Japan by Logicool and Sparco (distributed by import tuner Endless in North America), while compatible kits are designed and released worldwide by European manufacturers such as Playseat and MoveTech.

== Model comparison ==
Features common to all models include:

- Force feedback
- Brake / gas pedals
- Paddle shifters
- Clamp base
- Lap attachment
- USB connector

Features that vary between models are:

Feature	GT Force	Driving Force	Driving Force EX	Driving Force Pro	Driving Force GT
Currently available	no	no	no	no	no
Clutch pedal	no	no	no	no	no
Gear stick	no	no	no	yes	yes
Six-speed shifter	no	no	no	no	no
Sequential shifter	yes	yes	yes	yes	yes
Real-Time Adjustments Dial	no	no	no	no	yes
Wheel size	TBC	TBC	25 cm (10-inch)	25 cm (10-inch)	28 cm (11-inch)
Steering range (degrees)	200	200	200	900	900
Steering wheel cover	Rubber	Rubber	Rubber	Rubber	Rubber
D-pad / action buttons	yes	yes	yes	yes	20

== History ==
The original GT Force first came out in Japan and South East Asia in 2001. It was later released in North America and Europe. The brand soon evolved to "Driving Force" in these Logitech distributed territories. Code product is "LPRC" for Logicool PlayStation Racing Controller.

In 2007, the GT Force line-up was made of three wheels, the entry-level GT Force RX replacing the discontinued Driving Force type (79.99 USD/EUR), the medium-level GT Force Pro (129.98 USD/EUR) and the G25 Racing Wheel which replaced the first as the top level (299.99 USD/EUR).

Both are compatible with PlayStation 2, PlayStation 3, and Windows PC systems and are supported by Gran Turismo 5 Prologue.

== GT Force ==
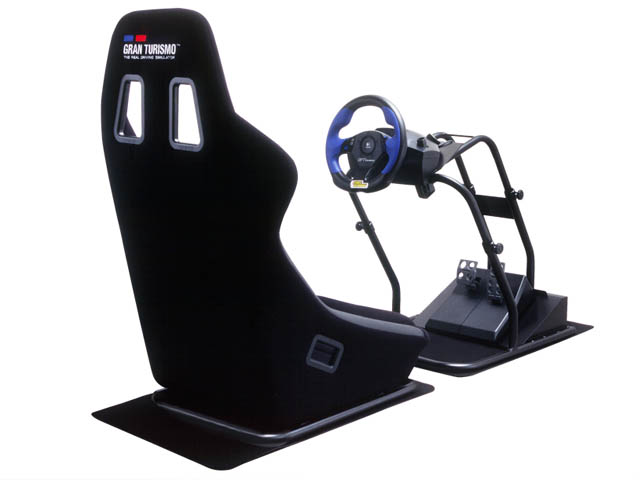
GT Force (LPRC-10000) with Racing Cockpit (LPSK-01002) bearing the Gran Turismo logo.

The GT Force (LPRC-10000) is a rebranded Logitech Wingman Formula GP, with a blue rather than a yellow rubber grip. It was released on April 28, 2001 as the Gran Turismo 3: A-Spec official wheel

=== GT Force for Gran Turismo 3 A-Spec (LPRC-10001) ===
A "GT Force for Gran Turismo 2000" (Gran Turismo 3: A-Spec, LPRC-10001) was scheduled for 2001, however due to a game title change it was replaced by the "GT Force Gran Turismo 3 A-Spec" custom version released on April 28, 2001.

=== GT Force Initial D version (LPRC-10002) ===
On June 26, 2003, Logicool released an Initial D Special Stage custom version of the GT Force (LPRC-10000).

== Driving Force ==
The Driving Force is the first evolution of the GT Force announced at the London Games Convention in early September 2001. This model is discontinued since it was replaced by the Driving Force Pro in 2003.

== Driving Force Pro ==
The Driving Force Pro (also known as the GT Force Pro (LPRC-11000)) is the Gran Turismo 4 Prologue official wheel released in December 2003.

=== GT Force Pro for Sega Rally (LPRC-11000S) ===
A Sega Rally 2006 custom version named was released on January 12, 2006.

=== GT Force Pro (LPRC-11500) ===
Manufactured by Logitech for the PlayStation 2 primarily as well as being compatible with select PC games, the wheel featured force feedback and 900 degree rotation. The wheel offers analogue accelerator and brake pedals, a sequential gear shift to the side and paddle shifters mounted on the back of the wheel in addition to the standard PlayStation 2 buttons. The controller was jointly designed by Logitech and Polyphony Digital to be used with Gran Turismo 4, however works in games not compatible with the 900 degree rotation by switching into a 200 degree mode. The wheel received strong praise from reviewers at launch for being an overall good experience when paired with Gran Turismo 4.

The Logitech website lists PlayStation 3 under System Requirements, indicating it is supported. 900° support will be software dependent.

== Driving Force EX ==
The Driving Force EX (also known as the GT Force RX (LPRC-12000) or Driving Force RX (Retail Version)) is the PlayStation 3 official wheel released on the console's launch date, November 11, 2006. It features force feedback and was succeeded by Driving Force GT. The wheel came bundled with Formula One Championship Edition.

== Driving Force GT ==
The Driving Force GT was released on December 13, 2007.

Developed in conjunction with Polyphony Digital, first introduced at the 2007 Tokyo Game Show and intended for use with Gran Turismo 5 Prologue, Gran Turismo 5 and all PlayStation 3 auto racing games, the Driving Force GT is the fifth entry in the company's Driving Force series of game controllers.
