= Man–machine interaction =

Man-machine interaction (MMI) may refer to:

- Control of machines in general using devices like steering wheel, automobile pedal, or button
- Human–computer interaction
