= G29 =

G29 may refer to:

- BMW Z4 (G29), a two-door roadster
- Glock 29, a pistol
- Haenel RS9, a German sniper rifle
- Logitech G29, a racing wheel
- HMS Offa (G29), an O-class destroyer of the Royal Navy
