= Logitech G25 =

Electronic steering wheel for video games

Logitech G25 Racing Wheel
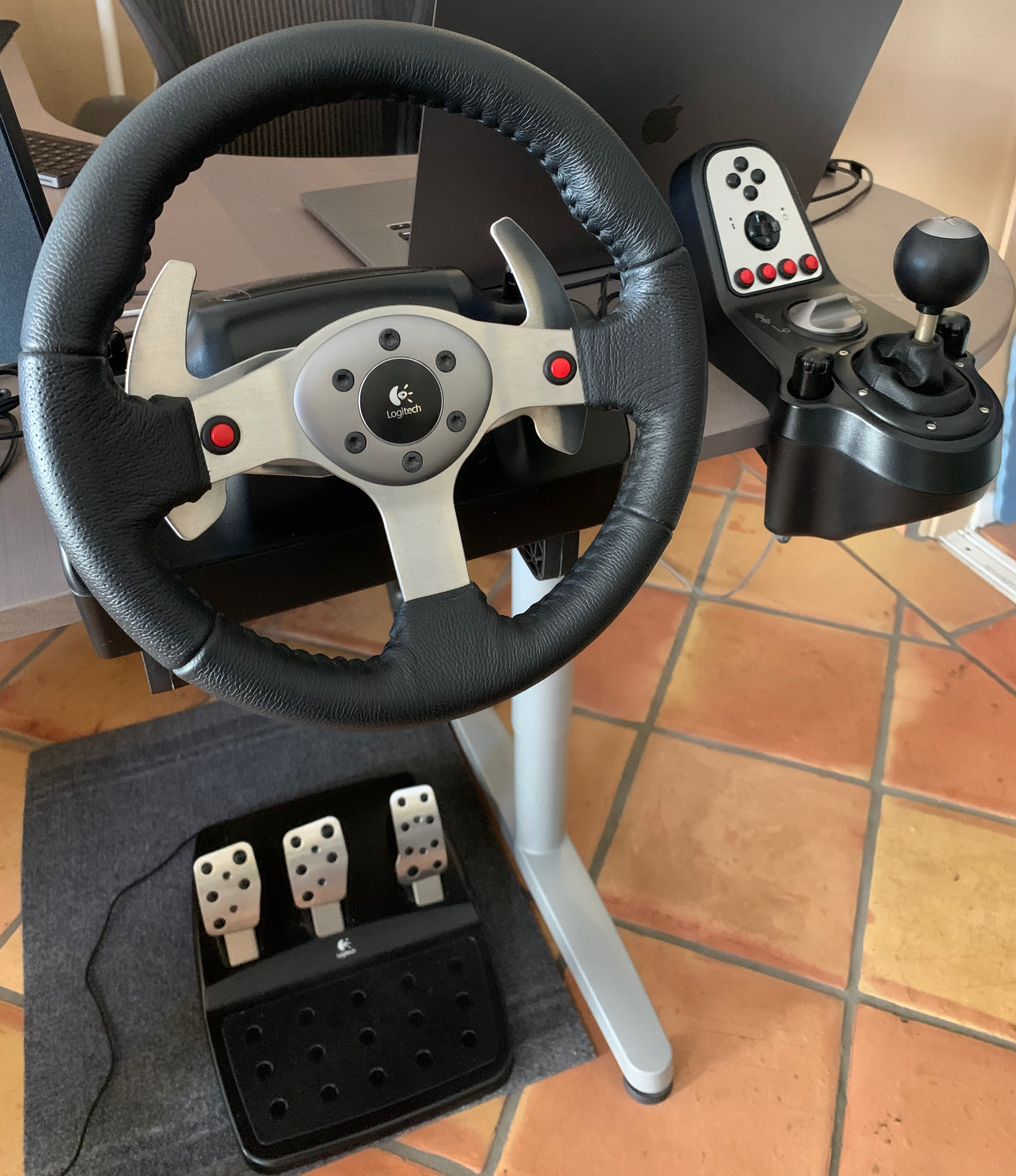
- Logitech G25 Racing Wheel, Gear Shifter, and 3 Pedal set with Accelerator, Brake and Clutch
- Manufacturer: Logitech
- Type: Steering Wheel controller
- Generation: Seventh generation era
- Lifespan: 2006-2010
- Input: Pressure sensitive D-Pad; 10x Digital buttons; Manual Sequential and Paddle Shifters; 900° steering angle; Brake, Clutch and Accelerate pedal
- Connectivity: USB 2.0
- Predecessor: Logitech E-UC2
- Successor: Logitech G27

The Logitech G25 is an electronic steering wheel designed for sim racing video games on the PC, PlayStation 2 and PlayStation 3. It uses a USB interface.

== Specifications ==
Its components are:

- A wheel:
  - 280 mm, leather-wrapped steering wheel.
  - Range of rotation adjustable up to 900 degrees.
  - 2 force feedback motors.
  - Only one set of gears between motors and wheel, including an anti-backlash design.
  - 2 paddleshifters.
  - 2 buttons.
- A set of stainless steel pedals, including:
  - Accelerator. (light spring)
  - Brake (heavy spring)
  - Clutch. (medium spring)
  - A carpet grip which keeps the pedals in position while playing.
- A shifter unit:
  - 8 buttons.
  - 1 D-pad.
  - A leather knob/metal rod gear stick with a 6-speed 'H' pattern. Reverse is selected by pressing down and changing to 6th.
  - A switch to change the gear stick to a sequential up-down mode.

Compared with other wheels in its class, the G25 is at the higher end of the range with an RRP of USD $299.99 or GBP £249.99. The higher cost is due to the inclusion of a number of features often not found in cheaper wheels.

A comparable wheel is the Fanatec 911 Porsche wheel, although it does not use any metal in its exterior construction.

In 2010, the Logitech G25 was superseded with the Logitech G27 steering wheel.

== See also ==
- Logitech 'G' series

- Logitech G27

- Steering wheel
- Logitech Driving Force Pro
- Racing game
- Sim racing
- Thrustmaster
- Fanatec
