= Gran Turismo 4 =

2004 sim racing video game

- North American cover art featuring the 2002 Ford GT40 Concept
- Developer: Polyphony Digital
- Publisher: Sony Computer Entertainment
- Director: Kazunori Yamauchi
- Producer: Kazunori Yamauchi
- Artist: Hiroki Imanishi
- Composers: Masahiro Andoh; Isamu Ohira; Daiki Kasho
- Series: Gran Turismo
- Platform: PlayStation 2
- Release: JP: December 28, 2004; NA: February 22, 2005; EU: March 9, 2005
- Genre: Sim racing
- Modes: Single-player, multiplayer

Gran Turismo 4 is a 2004 sim racing video game developed by Polyphony Digital and published by Sony Computer Entertainment for the PlayStation 2. It is the fourth main installment and the sixth overall in the Gran Turismo series. It was released on December 28, 2004, in Japan and Hong Kong, February 22, 2005, in North America, and March 9, 2005, in Europe, and has since been re-issued under Sony's Greatest Hits brand.

Originally planned for a 2003 release, Gran Turismo 4 was delayed for over a year and a half by Polyphony Digital, and had its online mode removed. The game features over 721 cars from 80 manufacturers, from as early as the 1886 Daimler Motor Carriage, and as far into the future as concepts for 2022. The game also features 51 tracks, many of which are new or modified versions of old Gran Turismo tracks, with some notable real-world additions.

Gran Turismo 4 was well-received critically and a commercial success, becoming one of the highest-selling games of 2005, and the fourth best-selling game on the PlayStation 2. The Chinese, Japanese, and South Korean releases of the game were bundled with a 212-page driving guide and lessons on the physics of racing. A PlayStation Portable enhanced port entitled Gran Turismo Mobile was originally planned for development, but was later renamed to Gran Turismo, which was released October 1, 2009.

== Gameplay ==
Players accumulate points by winning races in the normal first-person driving mode, called A-Spec mode. Each race event can yield up to a maximum of 200 A-Spec points. Generally, a win using a car with less of an advantage over the AI opponents is worth more points. Points can only be won once, so to win further points from a previously won event, it must be re-won using a car with less of an advantage over the AI. There are also 34 "Driving Missions" which yield 250 points each. Despite this, A-Spec points are experience points as opposed to currency.

A field of Formula GT cars on Tokyo Route 246

The new B-Spec mode puts players in the place of a racing crew chief: telling the driver how aggressively to drive, when to pass, and mandating pit stops (by monitoring tire wear and fuel level). The speed of the time in the race can be increased up to 3×, allowing for Endurance races to be completed in less time than would take in A-Spec mode. The 3× feature, however, must be turned on after every pit stop because it resets to normal time. The game manual says that the player may speed up B-Spec mode by up to 5×, but this is believed to be a typo. B-Spec points are given out for each race completed in B-Spec mode. This increases the skill level of the AI driver in the categories of vehicle skill, course skill, and battle skill. Players can thereby use B-Spec mode in harder races as the game progresses, but this mode cannot be used on wet, dirt, and snow courses.

Another new addition to the game is the Driving Missions, which are similar in experience to the license tests, but award successful completion with 250 A-Spec points and 1000 or more credits. Each mission takes place with a given car on a given track or section of track, and a given set of opponents. There are 4 sets of missions: The Pass, in which the driver must overtake an opponent within a certain distance; 3 Lap Battle, in which the driver must pass 5 opponents over the course of 3 laps; Slipstream Battle, in which the driver must overtake identical opponents by way of drafting; and 1 Lap Magic, in which the driver starts with a significant time penalty against much slower opponents and must overtake them all in the space of a single lap. Completing each set of missions earns the player a prize car.

A new Photo Mode is included in the game, which allows the player to control a virtual camera, taking pictures of their cars on the track or at specific locations, including the Grand Canyon. This game is able to produce a selection of screenshots with variable compression rate (Normal/Fine/SuperFine) and size (up to 1280x960 72dpi), and the user can choose to save or print to a supported USB device.

Compared with Gran Turismo 3: A-Spec, graphics are greatly improved with more detail on cars and tracks (despite running on the same PlayStation 2 hardware). The physics are also greatly improved, with the major upgrade that cars now experience body movement, such as pitching (forwards and backward rolling) under braking. Barriers have considerably more friction to slow down the cars in GT4 (in an attempt to stop the use of "wall riding"), but there is minimal friction between cars, so the advantage obtained by running into the side of another car (instead of braking) is still present. Each of the Driving Missions and Special Conditions events give a 5-second penalty for hitting the walls or opponents' cars in this way, where the car's speed is restricted to 50 km/h (31 mph) until the timer disappears when it reaches zero.

== Alternate versions ==
=== Prologue ===
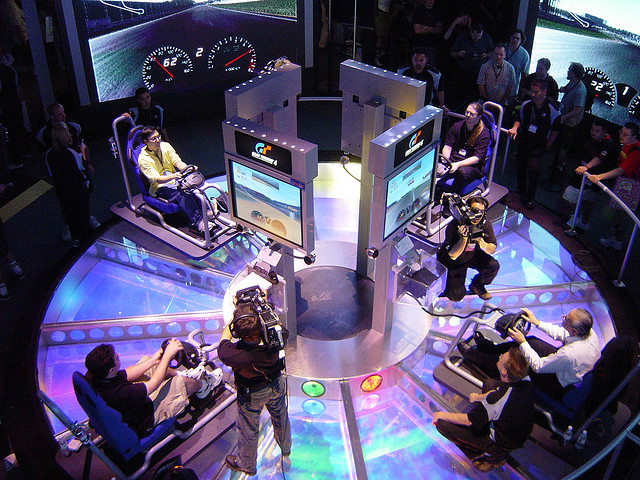
Gran Turismo 4 at E3 2003

Gran Turismo 4 Prologue (グランツーリスモ4 プロローグ, Guran Tsūrisumo Fō Purorōgu) is a 2003 racing simulation game developed by Polyphony Digital and published by Sony Computer Entertainment for the PlayStation 2. It is the fifth overall installment the Gran Turismo series. was released on December 4, 2003, in Japan and Southeast Asia, and May 26, 2004, in Europe. For undisclosed reasons, the game was not released in the North American market; however, a demo disc featuring Toyota Prius and Toyota MTRC concept car was available in the United States, either on requesting a Toyota Prius brochure online or by attending the Toyota stand at the 2004 New York International Auto Show, that features Gran Turismo 4 Prologue branding on the title screen. This short version title preceded the release of the full-length version Gran Turismo 4 in 2004 and was followed by Gran Turismo 5: Prologue in 2007.

In Japan, a limited "Signature Edition" featuring the signature of the series producer Kazunori Yamauchi on the front cover package preceded the release of the regular edition. The regular edition was also bundled with a white ceramic PlayStation 2 console in a Christmas limited SKU called "PlayStation Racing Pack" released in Japan on October 13, 2002.

In Europe, the game was bundled with a promotional "Making of DVD Video". While intended to be limited content, the DVD-Video was also included in the Platinum re-release. The DVD was later included in the limited Gran Turismo 4 "Special DVD Set" released in Japan on June 28, 2004. The regular edition was discontinued and the game was re-issued under Sony's 'Greatest Hits' line in Japan ("PlayStation 2 the Best") on August 5, 2004 and Europe ("Platinum"). As Gran Turismo 4 was intended to be released in time for the worldwide 2002/2003 Christmas release but was delayed, in consolation, Polyphony brought out Gran Turismo 4: Prologue as a sneak preview (including a documentary bonus disc in Europe) to the full experience of Gran Turismo 4.

Though it was necessary to limit the number of cars and courses included, this product still included some of the main features of the Gran Turismo franchise such as races, time attacks and license tests. The sneak preview also expressed the latest technology Polyphony Digital had accumulated over the past two years. Featuring 50 of GT4's then planned 500 cars as well as five courses, this expanded demo was designed as a stop-gap until the complete version was released.

The game includes a Driving School (License Tests) as well as early versions of some circuits, like the New York track which was modified in the full version. A new Gran Turismo official steering wheel, the Driving Force Pro known as GT Force Pro in Japan and supporting force feedback, was released by Logitech (Logicool in Japan) to coincide with the Gran Turismo 4 Prologue launch date. The European version came with several extra cars, most of them cars unveiled at the 2004 Geneva Motor Show, such as the BMW Concept M5 and the aforementioned Toyota MTRC.

Gran Turismo 4 Prologue has sold 1.4 million copies since its release.

=== Online version ===
Gran Turismo 4 Online Test Version (グランツーリスモ 4 オンライン実験バージョン, Guran Tsūrisumo 4 Onrain Jikken Bāshon) is a free 2006 PlayStation 2 game by Polyphony Digital. This is a limited edition of the 2004/2005 racing game Gran Turismo 4 featuring extra online services that were removed from the standard game due to some issues and a lack of time as the game had been delayed several times. Selecting the extra "Online" mode leads to the "Online Home" that features additional game modes, "Quick Race", "Tuned Car Race", "Private Race" (that requires a password) and "Time Attack". "News" inform about the availability for the online courses or special events, with limited date and time. Public online services ended on September 1, 2006.

This public beta for Gran Turismo 4 Online (GT4OL) was freely shipped to 4,700 selected gran-turismo.com members from Japan and 300 from South Korea to collaborate as "test players". Online services lasted three months from June 1 to September 1, 2006, and included 6-player "Competition" (対戦, taisen), Time Trial, chat (mail message and microphone communication), and an Internet ranking chart was available in the game's website. Nowadays it is possible to play it online again with alternate private servers.

This test was not intended to precede a Gran Turismo 4 Online full-scale release but instead to be used as a way to develop and test online features and structures for the upcoming Gran Turismo 5 on the PlayStation 3 system. Besides the 5,000 test players, seven special guests were invited to test Gran Turismo 4 Online. First, a special event named "Top Racer Battle" (トップレーサーBATTLE) was staged in the Polyphony Digital headquarters on August 17. Six drivers from the JGTC Japanese championship entered the game's online multiplayer "Competition" mode.

Motoyama won the test round, a 5-lap Fuji Speedway 2005 race with the drivers' respective JGTC GT500 cars. The actual Top Racer Battle though, a 10-lap Tsukuba Circuit one-make race on board a Mazda Roadster 1600 NR-A '04, was won by Ryo Michigami. Later from August 25 to September 5, 2006, Kazunori Yamauchi the Gran Turismo series producer (re)invited two Japanese and two European professional racing drivers sponsored by PlayStation to enter GT4OL's Time Attack mode Internet ranking chart and, either to challenge him or another guest in a versus race, either to compete with five test drivers in an 8~10 rounds multiplayer online competition called "trophy".

The first guest was Super GT GT500 Nissan Motul Pitwork Z driver Satoshi Motoyama (Top Racer Battle challenger), he entered the dedicated "Motoyama Trophy", a 2-lap 10 races online multiplayer competition, and won three rounds. The second guest specially came from France, Sébastien Loeb, LeMans 2005 PlayStation Pescarolo C60 Judd LMP Race Car '04 driver and WRC champion, he set a new Time Attack Internet record on the 24 Hours of Le Mans' Circuit de la Sarthe I ("Loeb Special Attack") and defeated Kazunori Yamauchi in their Pescarolo Online Time Attack duel on the same circuit (Internet rank 10th vs 11th). The last guests were both Top Racer Battle challengers, one is Ryo Michigami, Super GT GT500 Honda Takata Dome NSX driver, the other is Michael Krumm, GT500 Nissan Motul Pitwork Z driver. They competed with each other in a versus battle then entered a special trophy similar to Motoyama's.

A separate online testing campaign, Gran Turismo 4 Online Public Beta, was also held in North America in 2006 for the now-defunct PlayStation Gamer Advisory Panel members, with the same intention and features as the Japanese online test.

== Reception ==
Reception

Aggregate score
| Aggregator | Score |
|---|---|
| Metacritic | 89/100 |

Review scores
| Publication | Score |
|---|---|
| Edge | 7/10 |
| Eurogamer | 8/10 |
| Famitsu | 39/40 |
| Game Informer | 9.25/10 |
| GamePro | 4.5/5 |
| GameRevolution | B+ |
| GameSpot | 8.9/10 |
| GameSpy | 4.5/5 |
| GameZone | 9.7/10 |
| IGN | 9.5/10 |
| Official U.S. PlayStation Magazine | 5/5 |
| Detroit Free Press | 3/4 |
| Maxim | 10/10 |

Award
| Publication | Award |
|---|---|
| Game Critics Awards | Best Racing Game of 2003 |

Gran Turismo 4 received "generally favorable" reviews, according to review aggregator website Metacritic.

Jeremy Clarkson, host of the Top Gear television program, performed a head-to-head test of real-life versus GT4 on an episode of the program. He ran Laguna Seca Raceway in real life and used an Acura NSX for a lap time of 1:57. But in the game, he used a Honda NSX-R (which is lighter) with a lap time of 1:41:148. Clarkson also had to be shown by a race driving instructor where the line was between the game and reality. He pointed out that adjusting one's braking mid-turn in a real car could cause loss of control, and also mentioned that in the game, he is compelled to take bigger risks than he would in real life, and that in the game, the car did not suffer from brake fade. Despite the apparent discrepancies, in a column for The Sunday Times, Clarkson gave the game a score of three stars out of five and had this to say about it:

I called Sony and asked it to send me a game chip already loaded with the 700 computer cars. And I am in a position to test out its claims because, unlike most people, I really have driven almost all of them in real life. There are mistakes. The BMW M3 CSL, for instance, brakes much better on the road than it does on the screen. And there's no way a Peugeot 106 could out drag a Fiat Punto off the line. But other than this, I'm struggling: they've even managed to accurately reflect the differences between a Mercedes SL 600 and the Mercedes SL 55, which is hard enough to do in real life. There's more, too. If you take a banked curve in the Bentley Le Mans car flat out, you'll be fine. If you back off, even a little bit, you lose the aerodynamic grip and end up spinning. That's how it is. This game would only be more real if a big spike shot out of the screen and skewered your head every time you crashed. In fact, that's the only real drawback: that you can hit the barriers hard without ever damaging you or your car. Maybe they're saving that for GT5. Perhaps it'll be called Death or Glory.

Karl Brauer of Edmunds.com performed a similar test, also at Mazda Raceway Laguna Seca, in which he and two others — professional race driver A. J. Allmendinger, and IGN gaming editor Justin Kaehler — set times in GT4 and real life in a variety of cars. Brauer's best time in a Ford GT in the game was 1:38, and his best time on the real track was 1:52. In the four vehicles the trio tested, none was able to duplicate his game times on the real track. Brauer suggested the main differences between the game and reality:

Which brings up the single biggest difference between reality and virtual reality — consequences. A mistake on Gran Turismo 4 costs me nothing more than a bad lap time. A mistake with a real exotic car on a real racetrack is... a bit more costly. The other major difference between virtual racing and the real thing is feedback from the car — or an almost total lack thereof. Yes, the force feedback steering wheel does its best to let you know when you're veering off the track, or sliding the rear end, but none of this comes close to the kind of information you get while driving a real vehicle. And in a car like the Ford GT, that's vital information.

Many reviewers criticized the game for its continued lack of rendered damage. Instead of actual damage, the cars (depending on the speed and angle in which the collision occurred) simply bounce or spin off of the car, wall, or obstacle. Reviewers complained of the continued ability to take unrealistic short cuts, such as the ones on Fuji Speedway 90's, Driving Park Beginner Course and Circuit de la Sarthe I, where the driver can cut right across the chicane, allowing a player to win by cheating. One reviewer also complained that the game's vehicles do not have enough grip. The game has also been criticized for lack of online play which had been promised during early development, but was announced as being removed at the time of release. Many reviewers expressed disappointment in the game's AI system, noting that "virtual racers will follow their (driving) line with little concern for where the human driver is at any one time". This is more evident during rally races and missions in which a 5-second speed penalty is given for hitting the other cars or the barriers, regardless of who initiated the contact. Some critics found B-Spec mode to offer little to the overall experience.

Non-video-game publications made some positive reception too. Sean Cunningham of Maxim gave the game a perfect ten and asked, "Is GT4 more fetish than game? Probably. But if this is a fetish, then put a leather hood on us and whip us till we bleed!" Jason Hill of The Sydney Morning Herald gave it all five stars and stated that the game's biggest strength "is the realistic handling. You feel every nuance of the car's movements, weight shifts, and suspension, particularly with a Driving Force Pro steering wheel. This is a peerless driving simulation that will test even professional drivers". Charles Herold of The New York Times gave it a positive review and stated that while the game "aims for realism, it occasionally falls short. Competitors drive like mindless automatons, seemingly unaware of your existence. Cars can take endless amounts of damage, allowing you to control your turns by bouncing off other cars like a pinball. If a track doesn't have walls, like one set in the Grand Canyon, then an invisible barrier prevents you from going off track". However, Jim Schaefer of Detroit Free Press gave it three stars out of four and stated that "GT Mode does a great job of organizing your choices on a large home map. You can leave your garage to race, or jump over to ogle new and used rides at domestic and foreign dealerships, take on special challenges and buy parts upgrades".

=== Awards ===
- E3 2003 Game Critics Awards: Best Racing Game
- IGN: 5th best PS2 game of all time

=== Sales ===
By February 2005, Gran Turismo 4 had sold more than 1 million units in Japan. By March 2005, Gran Turismo 4 had sold over 6 million units worldwide. Gran Turismo 4 received a "Double Platinum" sales award from the Entertainment and Leisure Software Publishers Association (ELSPA), indicating sales of at least 600,000 copies in the United Kingdom. It sold more than 611,000 units in the United Kingdom by December 2005.

By March 2016, Gran Turismo 4 had shipped 1.27 million copies in Japan, 3.47 million in North America, 6.83 million in Europe, and 180,000 in Asia for a total of 11.76 million copies. It is the third highest-selling game in the Gran Turismo franchise, ahead of Gran Turismo, but behind Gran Turismo 5 and Gran Turismo 3: A-Spec.
