= Sim racing wheel =

Video game controller

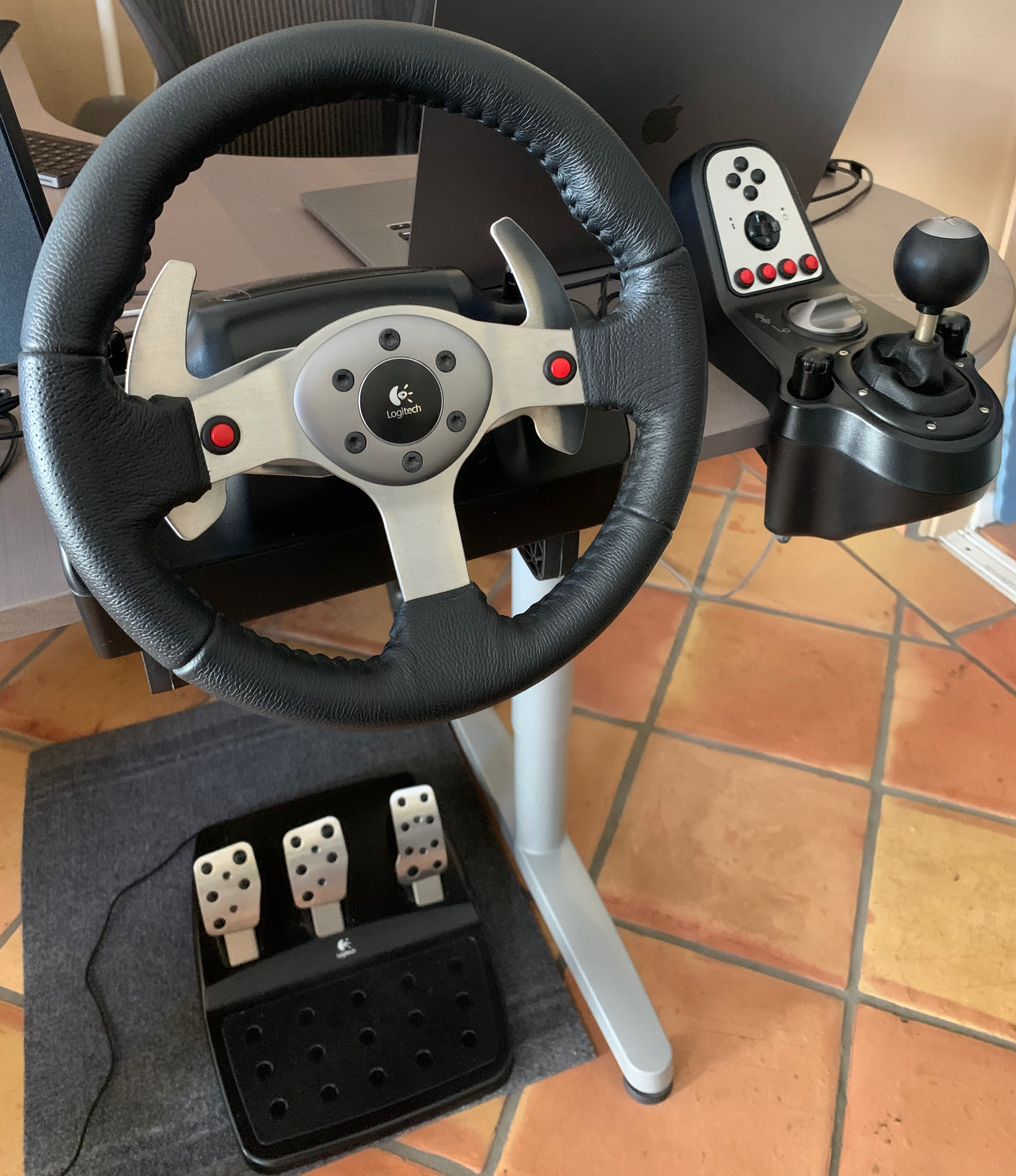
Logitech G25 racing wheel, gear shifter, and 3 pedal set with accelerator, brake and clutch

A sim racing wheel, also known as racing wheel, is a control device for use in racing games, racing simulators, and driving simulators. They are usually packaged with a large paddle styled as a steering wheel, along with a set of pedals for the accelerator, brake, and clutch, as well as transmission controls. An analog wheel and pedal set such as this allows the user to accurately manipulate steering angle and pedal control that is required to properly manage a simulated car, as opposed to digital control such as a keyboard. The relatively large range of motion further allows the user to more accurately apply the controls. Racing wheels have been developed for use with arcade games, game consoles, personal computers, and also for professional driving simulators for race drivers.

== History ==
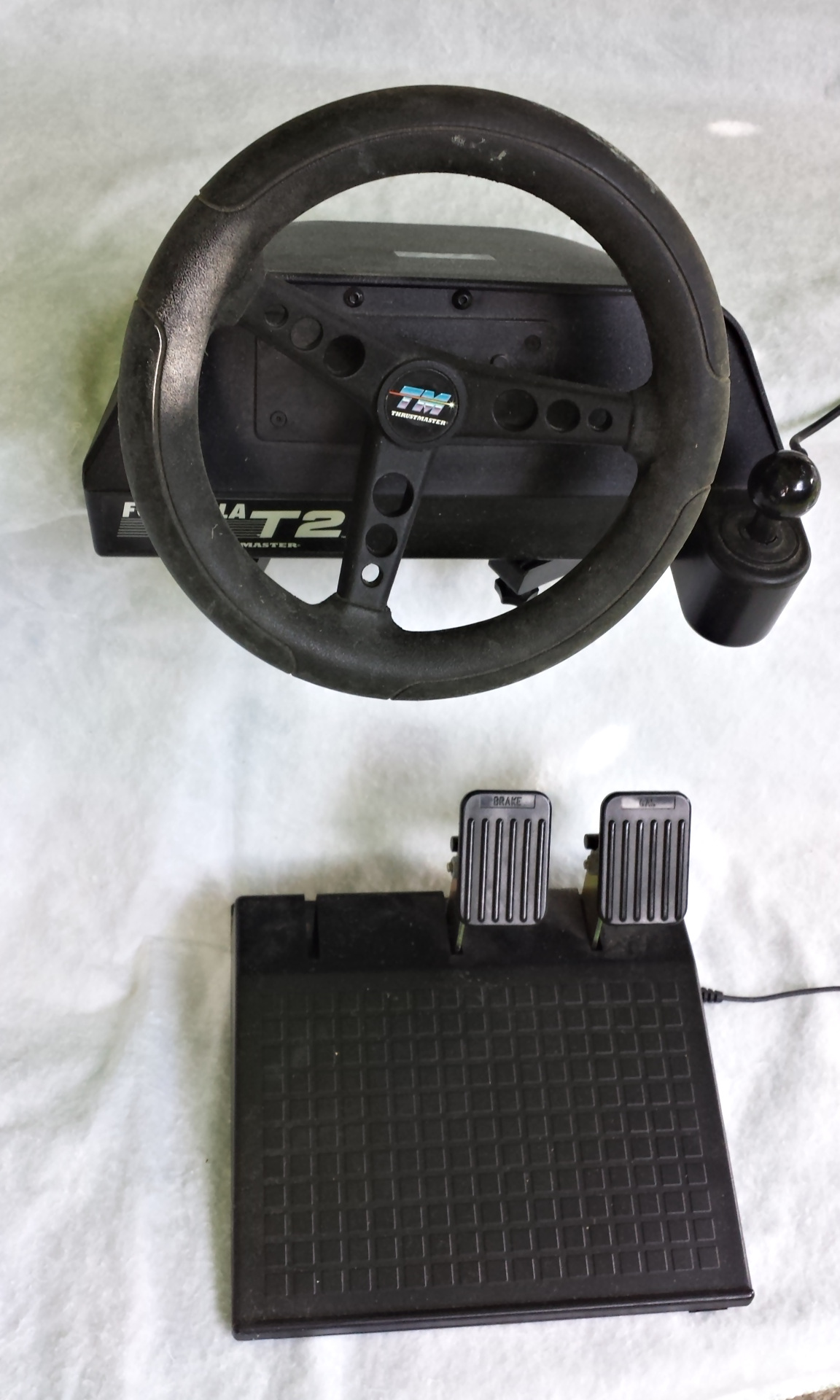
Thrustmaster Formula T2, one of the early PC racing wheel with pedals

Racing wheels have long been a feature of arcade racing games, with a steering wheel typically part of the arcade cabinet. International Mutoscope Reel Company's electro‑mechanical (EM) game Drive Mobile (1941) featured a steering wheel. Kasco's EM game Indy 500 (1968) featured a racing wheel and accelerator pedal. Atari's Gran Trak 10 (1974) was the first video game with a steering wheel. Sega's Out Run (1986) featured a hydraulic motion simulator cabinet with a force feedback (FFB) racing wheel, a stick shift, and acceleration and brake pedals.

In the home PC game market, racing wheels began appearing in the 1990s. One of the earliest racing wheels for the PC mass market was the Thrustmaster Formula T1, released in 1994. It had no force feedback, only some form of spring-based centering resistance proportional to the steering angle. Two of the earliest FFB wheels for the consumer PC market were the Microsoft Sidewinder Force Feedback Wheel, released in 1997, and the Logitech Wingman Formula Force.

== Force feedback ==
Force feedback sim wheels have motors to simulate steering kickback. Racing wheels started off as simple plastic wheels hooked up to a rotary potentiometer, which were sprung by springs or bungees. These spring-based wheels had a reactive torque that increased proportionally only to the steering angle, without regard for the simulated vehicle dynamics.

Eventually manufacturers began to use electric motors in the controllers, in place of springs, in order to achieve a level of force feedback (sometimes abbreviated FFB), first seen in Microsoft's Sidewinder wheel. At first this technology simply provided the centering force and other artificial effects such as shaking the wheel in a crash or other vibrations. However, as driving simulations have evolved, their physics engines have become more elaborate, allowing also for linking the force feedback close to the simulated vehicle dynamics of the in-game physics. This imitates forces experienced through the steering rack, rather than artificial effects in an attempt to achieve immersion. A fundamental factor for an adequate subjective steering-feel and perception of drivability from a force feedback wheel, is the transfer function from steering torque to steering angle.

In 2015, a preliminary comparison of gear-driven and direct-drive wheels in the 0–30 Hz frequency range, for a study on hard real-time multibody simulation and high-fidelity steering wheel force feedback, concluded that direct-drive wheels are preferable.

== Buttons ==
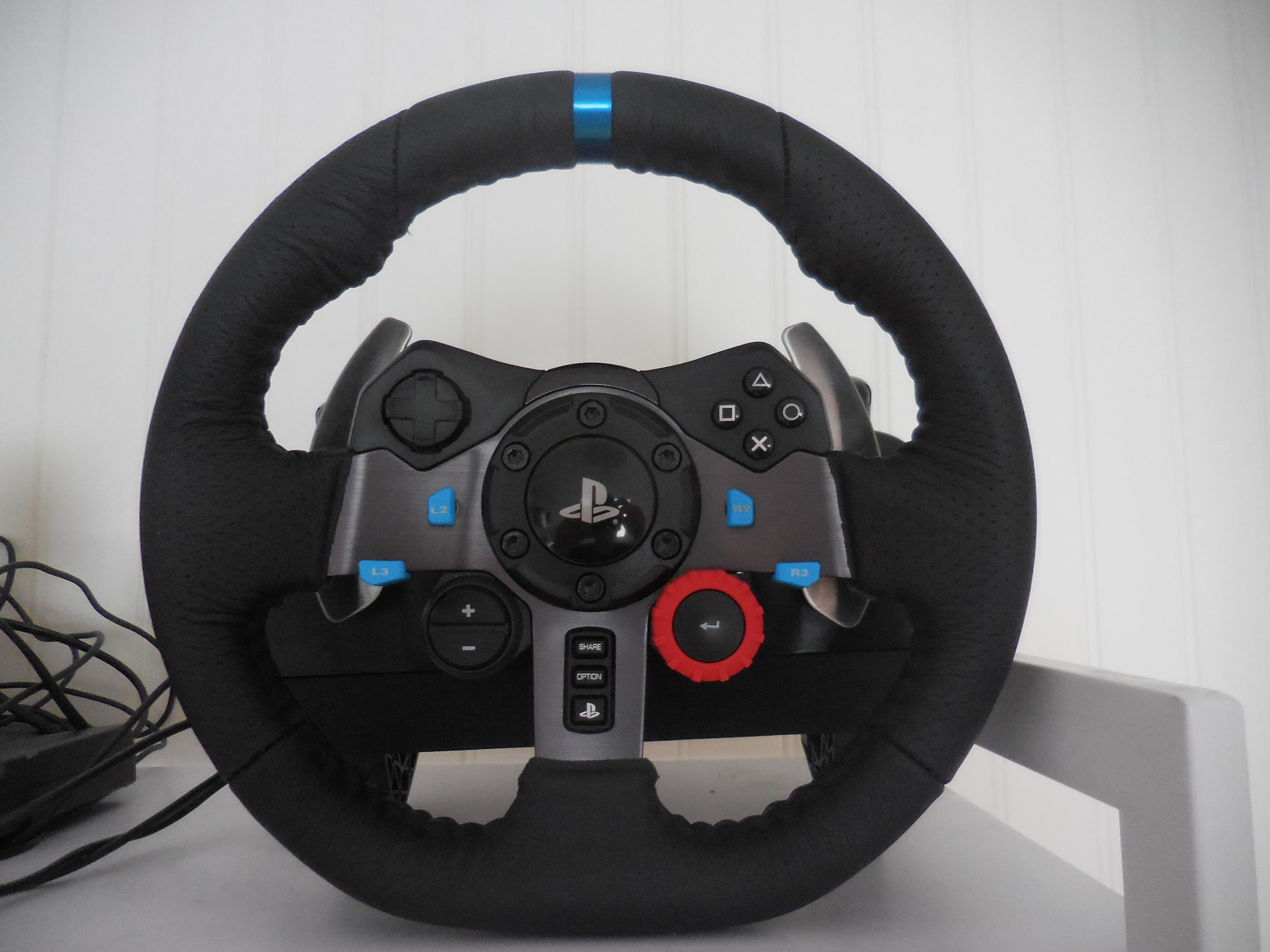
A Logitech G29 racing wheel

Sim racing wheels, like real-world racing steering wheels, can have many buttons. Some examples are cruise control or pit-lane limiter for the pit lane, button for flashing lights, windscreen wipers, radio communication with the team, adjustments to the racing setup (such as brake balance, brake migration, differential braking (entry, mid+, exit, hi-speed; to make use of torque effectively at different points in a corner), traction control (amplitude and sensitivity), anti-roll bar adjustment (front and rear), engine program (strat mode/ engine mode to get extra power or conserve fuel and engine life), engine braking (the engine's throttle or absence of throttle when there is no input from the gas pedal, i.e. whether the engine contributes to the car slowing down or is keeping its speed), etc.), seeing sideways or in the mirror, or to browse various menus (for example using a 7-way «funky switch»).
