= Polyphony Digital =

Japanese video game developer

Polyphony Digital Inc.
- Native name: 株式会社ポリフォニー・デジタル
- Type: Subsidiary
- Industry: Video games
- Predecessor: Polys Entertainment
- Founded: April 2, 1998; 28 years ago
- Founder: Kazunori Yamauchi
- Headquarters: Tokyo, Japan
- Key people: Kazunori Yamauchi (president)
- Products: Gran Turismo series
- Number of employees: ~300 (February 2022)
- Parent: Sony Computer Entertainment (1998–2005); PlayStation Studios (2005–present)
- Website: www.polyphony.co.jp

Polyphony Digital Inc. is an internal Japanese first-party video game development studio for PlayStation Studios. Originally a development group within Sony Computer Entertainment's Japan Studio known as Polys Entertainment, after the success of Gran Turismo in Japan, they were granted greater autonomy, reestablished as an individual company and renamed themselves Polyphony Digital. It currently has four studios: two studios in Japan, one studio in the Netherlands, and another one in the United States.

== Company overview ==
The studio is best known for the Gran Turismo racing game series. Led by Kazunori Yamauchi, Gran Turismo became the most successful racing series for the PlayStation, PlayStation 2 and PlayStation 3. The Gran Turismo series is designed to be a realistic driving simulator, offering realistic driving physics. In 2006, Polyphony released Tourist Trophy, in an attempt to bring the realism of Gran Turismo to motorcycle racing.

== Games developed ==
=== As Polys Entertainment ===
Game	Release date	Platform
Motor Toon Grand Prix	December 16, 1994	PlayStation
Motor Toon Grand Prix 2	May 24, 1996	PlayStation
Gran Turismo	December 23, 1997	PlayStation

=== As Polyphony Digital ===
Game	Release date	Platform
Omega Boost	April 22, 1999	PlayStation
Gran Turismo 2	December 11, 1999	PlayStation
Gran Turismo 3: A-Spec	April 28, 2001	PlayStation 2
Gran Turismo Concept	January 1, 2002	PlayStation 2
Gran Turismo 4 Prologue	December 4, 2003	PlayStation 2
Gran Turismo 4	December 28, 2004	PlayStation 2
Tourist Trophy	February 2, 2006	PlayStation 2
Gran Turismo HD Concept	December 24, 2006	PlayStation 3
Gran Turismo 5 Prologue	December 13, 2007	PlayStation 3
Gran Turismo (PSP)	October 1, 2009	PlayStation Portable
Gran Turismo 5	November 24, 2010	PlayStation 3
Gran Turismo 6	December 6, 2013	PlayStation 3
Gran Turismo Sport	October 17, 2017	PlayStation 4
Gran Turismo 7	March 4, 2022	PlayStation 4, PlayStation 5
My First Gran Turismo	December 6, 2024	PlayStation 4, PlayStation 5

=== Other projects ===
Polyphony Digital has also been involved in real life automotive projects. They have developed special versions of their Gran Turismo games for many car manufacturers as demonstrators for their cars. Nissan also commissioned them to design a special body kit for their 350Z coupe, which first appeared in 'GT Concept: 2002 Tokyo – Geneva' as the "Nissan 350Z Gran Turismo Aero", later becoming the "Fairlady Z NISMO S-Tune Concept by GRAN TURISMO" in GT4. There was also a faster 'Z-Tune' version with minor styling revisions and 400PS. The S-Tune was later sold in real life by NISMO (NISSAN MOTORSPORT) as a tuning package for existing owners.

In 2007, they were contracted to design the multifunction display on the new Nissan GT-R, which displays performance information such as G-forces, acceleration opening, brake pedal pressure, steering angle, an "optimal gearshift map," to emphasize economical vehicle operation.

When Nissan was looking for a company to develop the GT-R's user-friendly 'multi-function meter', the carmaker says Polyphony was the obvious choice because of the simple menu systems applied to video games such as Gran Turismo. "If you think about the GT-R's multi-function meter with the g-force information and everything else, we wanted it to be very easy to read, very easy to use," says Nissan's global vice president of communications, Simon Sproule. "It's really about the logic of how video games work and their menu systems – which anyone can use – and then applying it to the car."

Seiichi Ikiuo from Polyphony Digital encoded and decoded the movies for various SCEI games, such as The Legend of Dragoon, Everybody's Golf 2 and the Japanese versions of Roll Away and the original Crash Bandicoot games for the PS1.

== Recognition ==
In 2012, IGN placed Polyphony Digital at number 24 on their list of the 50 greatest developers of all time. In the March 2015 issue of GamesTM magazine, the company was number 34 on their list of the "50 Best Developers In The World".

In 2014, Polyphony Digital made a long-term partnership with Fédération Internationale de l'Automobile (FIA) for a plan to launch an official FIA Online Championship in 2015.
