= Brake balance =

Distribution of braking force between the tires

The brake balance or brake bias of a vehicle is the distribution of brake force at the front and rear tires, and may be given as the percentage distributed to the front brakes (e.g. 52%) or as the ratio of front and rear percentages (e.g. 52/48). The braking balance affects the driving characteristics in terms of how fast the vehicle can brake, how the vehicle can take corners, and tire wear. The optimal brake balance can vary between circuits, weather conditions and driving styles. On race cars, the brake balance is often part of the racing setup, and in formula car racing it is regularly adjusted during the course of an entire lap. In some cases, the brake balance may be adjusted to match the traction (grip) of the vehicle during braking, which usually means distributing a greater braking force to the front (for example 55/45). In other cases, it may be desirable for the brake balance to be the more similar at the front and rear (e.g. 50/50) for the tires to last longer, which may be beneficial in endurance racing. Adjustment of the brake balance is often done by adjusting a proportioning valve which determines the distribution of the brake force between the front and rear brakes. The adjustment can be made via mechanical couplings or with the help of a small electric motor.

== Front and rear wheel drive ==
Road cars with front-wheel drive can typically have a brake balance of 80% front-wheel bias, while road cars with rear-wheel drive typically have around 60-70% front-wheel bias.

== Changing the brake balance ==
Sometimes the brake balance can also be adjusted individually between the left and right tires, such as in systems for electronic brakeforce distribution and cornering brake control. In racing cars without such systems, a limited-slip differential can perform some of the same tasks, and this is also commonly adjusted as part of a racing setup.

=== Advanced forms of adjustment ===
Brake migration is an advanced adjustment of brake balance where the brake balance changes dynamically through a turn as a function of the force on the brake pedal. This function is made possible with brake-by-wire systems. For example, it can be useful to use less distribution on the rear brakes when entering the corner in order to stabilize the car, and progressively increase the rear-brake distribution as the apex approaches. On Formula One cars, the amount of brake migration can be adjusted using a rotary switch on the steering wheel.

== See also ==
- Anti-lock braking system
- Oversteer, more prone to happen with a rearward-biased brake balance, i.e. greater braking force on the rear wheels
- Regenerative brake
- Understeer, more prone to happen with a forward-biased brake balance, i.e. greater braking force on the front wheels
