= Gran Turismo 5 =

2010 sim racing video game

- European cover art, featuring the Mercedes-Benz SLS AMG
- Developer: Polyphony Digital
- Publisher: Sony Computer Entertainment
- Director: Kazunori Yamauchi
- Producer: Kazunori Yamauchi
- Programmers: Yuji Yasuhara; Takahito Tejima
- Composers: Masahiro Andoh; Daiki Kasho
- Series: Gran Turismo
- Platform: PlayStation 3
- Release: NA/EU: November 24, 2010; AU/JP: November 25, 2010
- Genre: Racing simulation
- Modes: Single-player, multiplayer

Gran Turismo 5 (グランツーリスモ 5, Guran Tsūrisumo Faibu; commonly abbreviated as GT5) is a 2010 sim racing video game developed by Polyphony Digital and published by Sony Computer Entertainment for the PlayStation 3. It is the fifth main installment and the tenth overall in the Gran Turismo series. It was released on November 24, 2010, in Europe and North America, and November 25, 2010, in Japan and Australasia. It was preceded by the Prologue version and is the first main entry of the series to be released for the PlayStation 3.

The game marks the first entry in the series with online races with support for up to 16 players. A damage model has been included with variations of damage depending on the car. Over 1,000 cars, 29 different locations, 77 different tracks, and a track generator are available in the game. Dynamic time and weather effects make their debut in the series. World Rally Championship, NASCAR and Super GT licenses are utilized for the first time in the Gran Turismo series.

Gran Turismo 5 was well-received critically and a commercial success, becoming the second best-selling PlayStation 3 game, the best-selling PlayStation 3 exclusive and the third best-selling game in the series with nearly 12 million copies sold. The game also won multiple awards and turned some players into real-life professional racing drivers with the GT Academy competition.

== Gameplay ==
=== New features ===
An example of both damage rendering and overturning, features new to Gran Turismo

Gran Turismo 5 is the first game in the franchise to provide a damage model, with variations of damage depending on the car. The game also features weather effects, which are available on certain circuits. Optional stereoscopic-3D resolution and karting found a place in the game. Furthermore, new visual effects have been introduced, including dynamic skid marks, dust and the ability for drivers to flash their headlights. A course editor which allows the player to create new circuits by using tools that randomly generate track-parts according to certain player-selected specifications, including the number of corners, the time of day and the number of sectors. There are a variety of themes the player can choose from to act as a base for each circuit design. Themes also have an effect on track length and highest elevation.

The physics are significantly revised compared with Gran Turismo 4. Cars no longer instantly turn-in but realistically must load up the outside wheel first, and destabilizing effects (such as under braking) have greater influence.

Gran Turismo 5 is the first game in the franchise to include both mechanical and external damage modelling, including a real-time deformation engine that processes model deformation according to the speed and angle of impact. It is also possible to overturn cars for the first time in the series. The cars in GT5 are separated into "premium" and "standard" vehicles. Premium vehicles are more detailed and include a fully detailed cockpit view, while standard vehicles are less detailed. Standard cars initially could not receive aftermarket wheels, however, as of the version 2.02 update this is no longer the case. Gran Turismo 2 previously included damage, but was limited to mechanical failures only.

=== Tracks ===
Gran Turismo 5 allows players to drive 31 different locations or "scenery" and 81 different track layouts (the previous iteration in the main numbered series, Gran Turismo 4, included 51 tracks total). Dunsfold Aerodrome, located in the United Kingdom – the test track of the British automotive television show Top Gear – is included in the game. The playable demo of Gran Turismo 5 at Gamescom 2009 featured the Tokyo Route 246 track, seen in previous incarnations of the game. Various real-life circuits return from previous games in the series. These include (among others) Nürburgring, Circuit de la Sarthe, Tsukuba Circuit, Mazda Raceway Laguna Seca and Suzuka Circuit. New real-life circuits included in the game include (among others) Indianapolis Motor Speedway, Monza Circuit, Daytona International Speedway and two new Rome and Madrid city circuits. Many fictional circuits return from previous games in the series including 'Trial Mountain', 'Deep Forest Raceway' and 'Autumn Ring'. An official list of all tracks available in the game has been released by Polyphony Digital.

==== Downloadable tracks ====
The "Track Pack" downloadable content, includes Circuit de Spa-Francorchamps (with weather change) and Kart Space I/II. On January 17, 2012, Polyphony Digital released the "Speed Test Pack" that includes "Special Stage Route X". In June, Twin Ring Motegi returned to the series as DLC after the 2012 GT Academy.

=== Vehicles ===
Customization in GT5 ranges from engine tune-ups to body effects to improve aerodynamics, as shown on this Dodge Challenger SRT-8.

Gran Turismo 5 provides a total of 1,089 cars. Ferrari, Lamborghini and Bugatti make their first main release appearance in the franchise. The new "gullwing" Mercedes-Benz SLS AMG appeared, along with the Ferrari 458 Italia and the Lexus LFA supercar. McLaren also made their first appearance as a native manufacturer with the inclusion of the McLaren F1 road car, the F1 GTR race edition, and the MP4-12C road car. It is the first main release in the series to feature licensed Formula One cars, with the Ferrari F2007 and F10 included. Le Mans spec cars made a return appearance. Hybrid cars such as the Toyota Prius and the Honda Insight are included in the game. The series' creator Kazunori Yamauchi mentioned that the latest hybrid and electric cars would be included, including the Tesla Roadster (2008) and Mitsubishi i-MiEV. At Gamescom 2010, it was also revealed that GT5 would include the Jaguar XJ13 race car prototype, as well as the Ferrari 330 P4 and the Ford Mark IV race cars, and as the developers put it, "will allow players to create the race that never came to be", since the XJ13 program was canceled before the car was ready for competition. Additionally, in association with Red Bull Racing, the development team worked on a new prototype car called the "X2010 Prototype" which was designed with the idea of, "If you built the fastest racing car on land, one that throws aside all rules and regulations, what would that car look like, how would it perform, and how would it feel to drive?" This car was worked on by Polyphony Digital and Red Bull's aerodynamics expert, Adrian Newey, and is one of the cars in the game. Up to 16 cars or 32 karts would be able to race on track at once whereas previous installments allowed only six cars per race max. Polyphony Digital released the official vehicle list which also shows which vehicles were to be standard or premium.

The cars in GT5 are separated into two categories, premium and standard. Premium cars are highly detailed and thus have high polygon counts, high texture resolution, feature headlights capable of high and low beams, detailed interior camera views, and detailed damage models. Premium cars also have working windshield wipers which are operated on tracks with rain or snow. Standard cars have lower polygon counts and texture resolution, standard headlights and basic damage modelling. After the Spec 2.0 update they feature simplified interior camera views. For open-topped cars, they have a functioning steering wheel and working gauges. Around 25% of all cars in the game fall into the "premium" category.

Classic sports cars are also a distinctive feature in GT5. Classics such as the Triumph Spitfire, Mini Marcos and Alfa Romeo Spider have also been added. Alongside this, some commercial vehicles have unusually been added to the game. Vehicles such as the Volkswagen Type 2 and the Volkswagen Schwimmwagen have been added to the game.

==== Downloadable cars ====
In the Spec 2.0 update, there is the #71 Schulze Motorsport Nissan GT-R which Yamauchi drove in the 2011 24 Hours of Nürburgring and the new stock car designs of the 2011 NASCAR Season. In the new "Racing Car Pack" DLC, there are 14 new touring cars that are based on cars in the game like the Honda CR-Z and the Toyota Prius. Also, there is a newer version of the Red Bull X2010 called the X2011. On December 20, 2011, Polyphony Digital released "Car Pack 2" which features 2 new Volkswagen vehicles, the Golf R and Scirocco R, the new 2012 Nissan GT-R Black Edition and the 2011 Mini Cooper S. On January 9, 2012, PD has released a concept video for the upcoming Acura NSX for the North American International Auto Show. However, Kazunori did not state any information about the NSX's DLC release. The week after, Polyphony released "Car Pack 3" together with the "Speed Test Pack" which includes the Lamborghini Aventador, Aston Martin V12 Vantage, Nissan Leaf, Mini Countryman, Volkswagen Beetle and a Premium Jaguar XJR-9. In June, a free DLC release added a new car: the Scion FR-S, a variant model of the Toyota 86 and Scion's first vehicle to appear as a premium model. On September 25, update 2.08 brought 3 new cars: the Honda Weider HSV-010 '11 Super GT car, the Subaru BRZ (another variant of the Toyota 86), and the Nissan GT-R N24 GT Academy '12 car, which participated in the 2012 24 Hours Nürburgring., On 28 November, the new 2014 Chevrolet Corvette C7 Prototype was released as a free DLC. On January 15, 2013, the Chevrolet Corvette C7 Final Prototype was released as another free DLC.

== Development ==
The game was first revealed at E3 2005 under the name Vision Gran Turismo. This was not GT5 but simply Gran Turismo 4 (for the PlayStation 2) with more cars on track and PC-rendered footage. The PlayStation 3 would not be released until November 11, 2006, and with no Gran Turismo game in the console's launch line-up. Various bits of information and news was revealed about the game from then on, but it was not for another three years that the public got a chance to have a proper look at GT5.

At Sony's E3 2009 Press Conference, a trailer for Gran Turismo 5 was shown, revealing the inclusion of Super GT, NASCAR and WRC but no release date was revealed. Yamauchi said that "We've actually reached a point where we can probably release [GT5] anytime, except that you can also keep working as long as you want to as well, it's just a matter of timing". Yamauchi later explained that "Deciding a release date for a game is always difficult, as it's not something I can decide on my own. The agreement on a date comes between various parties at Sony, and it's not necessarily a date I would be hoping for. March would've been too early. We could have produced the game in time to make that deadline, but the finished product wouldn't have had everything that I wanted to include". Sony Computer Entertainment has certain control over the release dates of their games, which could be one of the contributing factors delaying Gran Turismo 5. Gran Turismo 5 was shown off extensively at E3 2010 including a new trailer, a North and Latin American release date, playable demos on the show floor and various private press conferences revealing new information about the game. Alongside the original release, two collector's editions were released; one featuring some extra bonus content and the other, more expensive option containing extra paraphernalia such as further reading on car racing.

Overall, Gran Turismo 5 took more than five years to complete, with a total cost estimated at $60 million, although Polyphony Digital did release four other games during this period. The first game in the series had also taken five years. Yamauchi has expressed the difficulty of developing for the PlayStation 3, specifically mentioning how the extensively different (at the time) architecture of the Cell processor had made programming extremely challenging and time-consuming. This greater than expected difficulty to program for the Cell processor is speculated by some people to also be part of the reasons why Gran Turismo 5 was delayed a number of times.

All downloadable contents were removed from sale on April 30, 2014. The online servers were shut down on May 30, 2014. On April 29, 2014, Sony announced the final online event for Gran Turismo 5, which started on April 30, 2014, and ended with the shutdown of the online servers. Players were awarded with five cars in Gran Turismo 6 for participating in the event.

=== Time Trial Demo and 2010 GT Academy ===
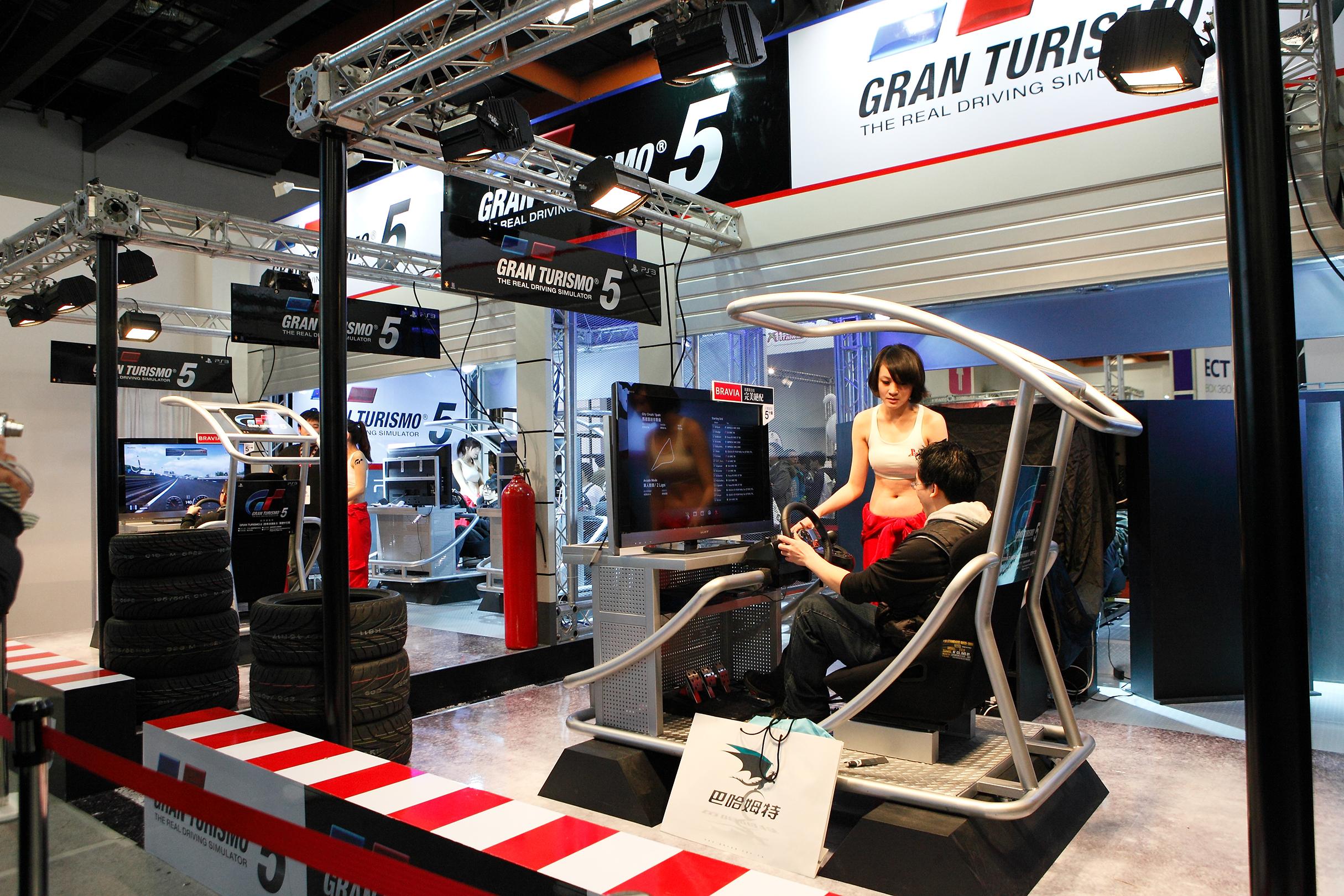
GT5 Time Trial Demo with Sony Bravia at the 2011 Taipei Game Show

The GT5 Time Trial Demo was released on December 17, 2009, on the PlayStation Network; it was only playable while the user was signed into the PlayStation Network. It was not so much a demo of GT5 itself, but as the first part of the 2010 GT Academy, with the fastest drivers from the time trial eventually getting the chance to drive a real racing car in a real racing series. Nevertheless, it showed what progress had been made since Polyphony Digital's previous game, Gran Turismo 5 Prologue in terms of graphics, physics and other aspects of game-play and design. It featured stock and tuned versions of the Nissan 370Z. The track featured in the demo was the Indianapolis GP circuit, which is new to the Gran Turismo series. This demo was praised for its graphics and updated physics, however it has been criticized for its stiff camera, and confusion over what aspects of the final game the demo represents. The Time Trial demo is no longer playable since the 2010 GT Academy was finished.

=== 2011 GT Academy ===
On November 16, 2010, it was revealed that the GT Academy would return for a third year, this time for drivers in the USA. GT Academy is a three-phase competition with the winner being trained and enrolled as a professional racing driver in preparation for a major race event next year. A reality TV show on sports channel SPEED chronicled the competition. The preliminary virtual rounds tested of driving skills in Gran Turismo 5 using pre-selected Nissan vehicles and all entrants would receive free digital content for playing. The top 32 drivers were then invited to a live GT5 National Finals, with the 16 leading players taken to the GT Academy Boot Camp. The second round of the competition was scrapped due to the widespread use of cheating.

Sony and Polyphony Digital have confirmed that the Gran Turismo 5 Academy events would be available for European players to participate in from March 4, 2011.

=== Song Track Naming Competition ===
At E3 2010, a new trailer was shown revealing various aspects about GT5 including a release date. The song used for the trailer was by Japanese composer Daiki Kasho; many fans wanted to know the name of the song, but it was untitled. Polyphony Digital recognised this and started a competition open to all fans around the world, to submit a name for the song. The winner would have their name immortalised in Gran Turismo 5s credits and their title become the official name of the music track. The winner was chosen by Yamauchi out of 5,444 entries: it was "50UL 0N D!SPLAY" (a stylised form of "Soul On Display") submitted by a fan from Argentina.

=== Other peripherals ===
Kazunori Yamauchi promised that Gran Turismo 5 could have some compatibility with the PlayStation Portable version. He stated, "we're going to make it so that you can actually export the cars for the PSP version into Gran Turismo 5, so you can export your garage".

The game was reported by media in September 2009 to allow head tracking using the PlayStation Eye, though no official confirmation came in the following months. This feature would allow the player to move their head naturally while sitting down, upright, and have the view around the 3D cockpit change accordingly.

Officially announced in conjunction with Toyota in January 2010 was a GPS-based device which, when loaded into the game, would create a 'ghost' lap of a run through a race circuit in real life if equipped for data recording, allowing someone to view or race against their real life driving. This became available for tracks which exist in real life, but there was no information on which or how many circuits in total would support the feature.

=== Multiple screens ===
The game supports up to six different views that can be presented on six or more PS3 consoles. Two left views, two right views, server view (front with dials), and a front view without any dials all can be duplicated on an extra PS3 console if they are on the same LAN.

=== Updates ===
The game has been updated and expanded several times in its lifespan. Many of the updates have improved the multiplayer racing, including weight and power restrictions on which cars can be driven in an online session, a car performance rating system, handicaps such as ballast and engine restriction, mechanical damage, and the ability to use the built-in course maker in online multiplayer races. Physics updates have not been documented in the update logs, however many users have noted changes to the physics once updates are installed. Other updates have included additional events, an online car dealership, removal of the copy protection for saved games, friend rankings, and various adjustments to the rewards and restrictions in the game.

The final update (v2.16) was released on May 31, 2014, which permanently disabled all online features such as online play and Seasonal events. On July 21 another patch (v2.17) was released, which removed the online requirement for installing the downloadable content after the servers went offline.

=== Spec 2.0 and DLC ===
A new update for Gran Turismo 5, called Spec 2.0 was released on October 11, 2011, featuring 11 new NASCAR vehicles, a new downloadable opening movie (no longer available after the server shutdown in 2014), the ability to save during endurance races, weather intensity control and AI improvements. Along with the release of Spec 2.0, Yamauchi also announced that four DLC packs would be available on October 18. These packs featured 15 new vehicles, two new tracks, 20 new driver costumes and 100 new paint colors. The packs were released on October 18, while the North American release was delayed until October 25. PD stated that all following DLC packs would be released in a two-month time frame.

- A second car pack was released on December 20, 2011, that features four new vehicles: the Mini Cooper S, Volkswagen Golf VI R, Volkswagen Scirocco R and the Nissan GT-R Black Edition.
- A third downloadable-content pack was released on January 17, 2012, featuring the track "Route X" and a third car pack including Nissan Leaf G 2011, Aston Martin V12 Vantage 2010, Volkswagen Beetle 1200 1966, Jaguar XJR-9 LM Racecar 1988, Lamborghini Aventador LP700-4 2011, and the Mini Cooper S Countryman (R60) 2011.
- GT Academy was released on May 1, 2012, as a free standalone title on the PlayStation Network as a collaboration between Nissan and Polyphony Digital. A key feature was the ability to unlock exclusive "academy cars" for use in Gran Turismo 5 as well as a special racing suit for anyone who completed all challenges. The rewards for the game were handed out on July 4.
- A fourth downloadable-content pack featuring Twin Ring Motegi along with a free Scion FR-S was released on 26 June 2012.
- A fifth pack added three individual cars: a Honda Weider HSV-010 '11 Super GT car, the Subaru BRZ, and the Nissan GT-R N24 GT Academy '12 race car. It was released on September 25, 2012.
- A free DLC with Corvette C7 Test Prototype was released on 28 November 2012.
- A free DLC with the Corvette C7 Final Prototype was released on January 15, 2013, revealing the Corvette C7's body and interior.
- A new cumulative package which contains all the aforementioned content was released sometime in Q2 2015.

As of today, all downloadable content has been permanently removed from PlayStation Store.

=== Online play ===
Gran Turismo 5 also featured an online mode. Players would meet in 'lounges' or 'race rooms' and give away (and/or share) cars, car parts and trained AI drivers to friends. They could also share game pictures and designed tracks.

All online activity closed on May 20, 2014, but a special event was held from April 30 to May 30 that allowed players to unlock five additional cars for Gran Turismo 6.

== Marketing ==
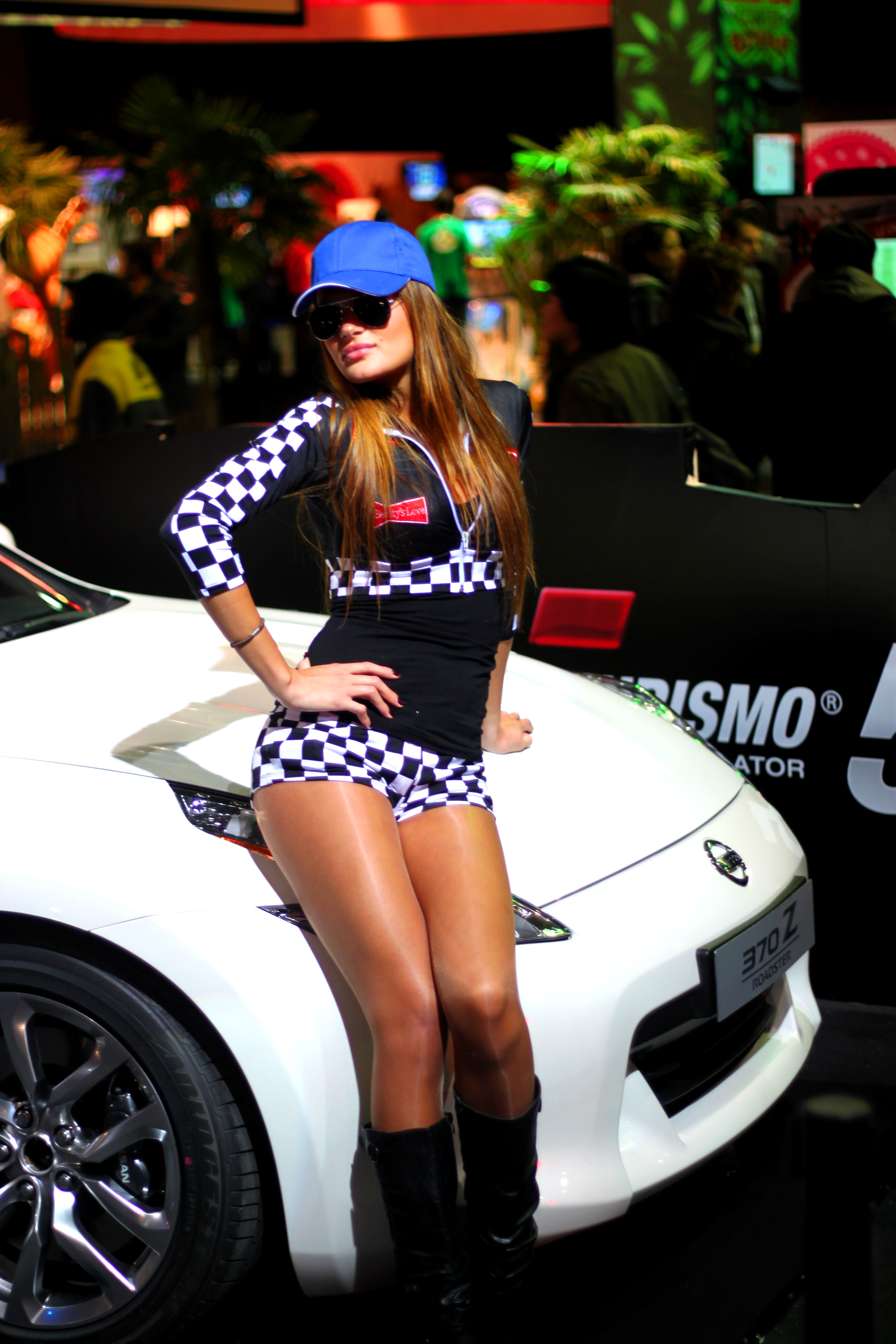
Gran Turismo 5 promotion at Paris Games Week 2010

Gran Turismo 5's marketing campaign started on November 18, 2010, with a TV commercial featuring the fictional marketing character Kevin Butler as part of Sony Computer Entertainment's It Only Does Everything advertising campaign for their video game products in North America. The commercial depicts Butler as the 'VP of Add More Awesome' explaining how he made Gran Turismo 5 "more awesome" by adding more features that were previously thought impossible.

At the October 2010 Australian International Motor Show, Toyota hosted a 24-hour PlayStation 3 GT5 endurance race, a recreation of the 24 Hours Nürburgring, with a total of 48 drivers split into two teams, racing virtual interpretations of the Toyota FT-86 G Sports Concept for a full day and night.

On November 14, it was revealed that Sony had teamed with Swiss watchmaker Tissot to host the official countdown timer for the launch of Gran Turismo 5. To promote the relationship, Tissot gave away one customized, GT5 edition Tissot PRS 516, every day up until the release date. In February 2011, a real version of the Polyphony Digital-designed Citroën GT was floated by the Rialto Bridge in Venice, recreating a location in Gran Turismo 4.

== Release ==
After promising that GT5 would be released in 2010 after missing its initial March 2010 Japanese release date, Sony announced at E3 2010 that Gran Turismo 5 would be officially launched in North and Latin America on November 2, in Europe and Japan on November 3 and in Australia on November 4, 2010, but was later revealed that the game would not meet its November release date and would instead be released later in the "holiday season". Sony producer Taku Imasaki said that the reason for the delay was that series creator Kazunori Yamauchi and Polyphony Digital want to "make certain they are creating the perfect racing experience". In addition, the Sony spokesman Makiko Noda said that the reason of the delay was due to production reasons. Later, Sony stated that the game would be released "before Christmas" [2010].

The actual reason for the delay turned out to be on the production side. Gran Turismo 5 missed its production window by three days. Kazunori Yamauchi publicly apologized via his Twitter account and explained that with such a complex game, a lot has to be ironed out. He finished his Tweet with, "Wait a little longer". It was later claimed by a Blu-ray forum moderator that the delay was due to Sony's decision to release the game under the newer 3.50 SDK firmware standard (to combat piracy), rather than 3.41 as originally intended. While at the Specialty Equipment Market Association Show on November 2, 2010, Yamauchi confirmed to automotive blog Jalopnik that GT5 had entered final production for release.

After weeks of speculation, it was officially announced that Gran Turismo 5 would be released on November 24 for Asia, North America and Europe and November 25 for Japan and Australia.

=== Retail editions ===
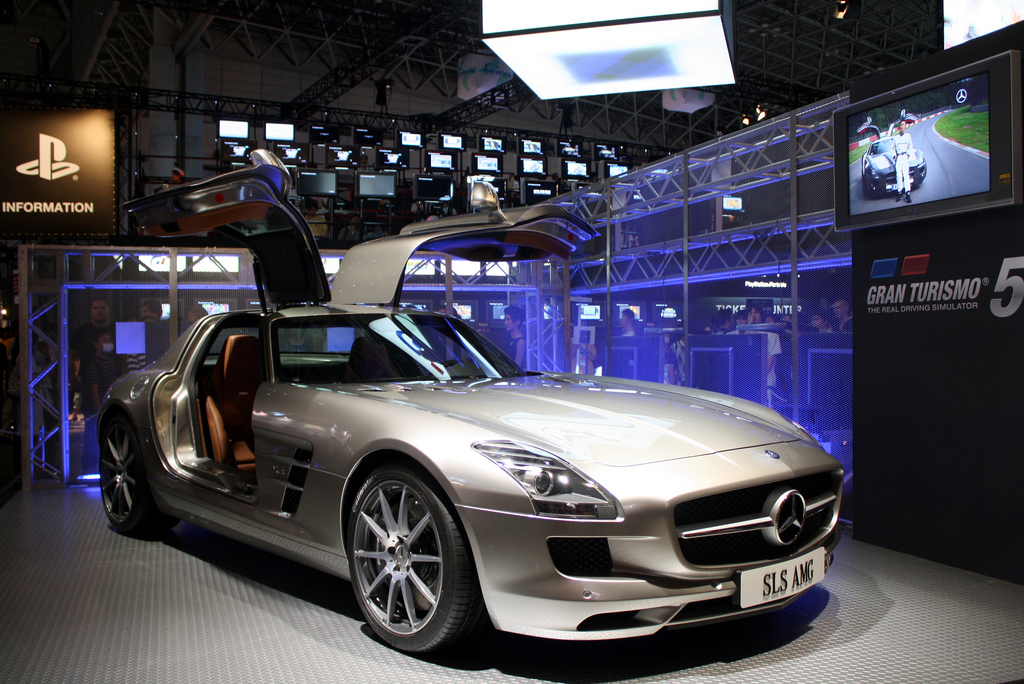
GT5 exposition at TGS 2009, featuring a Mercedes-Benz SLS AMG

Alongside the standard edition of the game, there are nine other versions of the game exclusive to certain countries and/or regions around the world. All of the special edition versions of the game are sold in limited quantities and include a copy of the game as standard.

- The Collector's Edition is available in North America, Europe and Asia.
  - The North American Collector's Edition includes a retail version of the game, a custom etched Keychain, a 1:43 scale model of a Nissan GT-R with exclusive livery, a 300-page APEX book with hints on driving technique, car tuning, future technologies and more, an e-voucher for five unique "Chrome Line" edition cars, and a Certificate of Authenticity.
  - The European Collector's Edition includes a retail version of the game, a 300-page APEX book with hints on driving technique, car tuning, future technologies and more, an e-voucher for five unique "Chrome Line" edition cars, an exclusive GT5 dynamic theme and a Certificate of Authenticity.
- The Signature Edition is exclusive to Europe, Australia and New Zealand. It includes a retail version of the game, a steel case finished in 'Obsidian Black' (official Mercedes-Benz SLS AMG colour choice), a coffee table book that details the cars and locations in GT5, a 300-page APEX book with hints on driving technique, car tuning, future technologies and more, a Gran Turismo-branded wallet containing a competition entry card giving one person the opportunity to win a real Mercedes-Benz SLS AMG car (the competition would be similar to the GT Academy), a GT-branded USB pen drive containing an exclusive GT5 dynamic theme and a Polyphony Digital/Mercedes-Benz exclusive trailer, a custom etched Keychain, a 1:43 scale Mercedes-Benz SLS AMG model in an exclusive livery, an e-voucher for six unique "Stealth" edition cars and an e-voucher for five unique "Chrome Line" edition cars.
- The Japanese and Asian Racing Pack is a bundle which includes a retail version of the game and a 300-page APEX book with hints on driving technique, car tuning, future technologies and more bundled with a 'Titanium Blue' PlayStation 3 console with a 'Titanium Blue' DualShock 3 controller. The console would be equipped with a 160GB hard drive.
- In Europe is a bundle which includes a retail version of the game and 300-page APEX book with hints on driving, car tuning, future technologies and more, an e-voucher for five unique "Chrome Line" edition cars, an exclusive GT5 dynamic theme, a Certificate of Authenticity bundled with a 'Charcoal Black' PlayStation 3 console and a 'Charcoal Black' Dualshock 3 controller. The console is equipped with a 320GB hard drive.
- The Gran Turismo 5 XL Edition, a new edition of the game, was released on January 17, 2012. This version includes the original retail version of the game, along with the Spec 2.0 update already installed, plus vouchers for the game's DLC that was released in 2011. This version also has an alternative box art: Instead of the Le Mans Red Mercedes SLS AMG, the same car is now painted silver, and the inside cover features two screenshots of the Red Bull X2011 Race Car (which is featured as DLC, itself being an evolved, faster form of the Red Bull X2010 featured in the game as well), which can be flipped and used as the front box cover.
- A new edition of the game which was released on 26 September 2012 - The Gran Turismo 5: Academy Edition is the latest version of the original GT5 game. It included all the functionality updates and new content that has been made available since the launch. It also comes with a voucher for all the DLC, with the exception of: Twin Ring Motegi Pack, Honda Weider HSV-010 (SUPER GT) '11, Corvette C7 Test Prototype '12, 2014 Corvette Stingray Final Prototype, Scion FR-S '12, Subaru BRZ S '12, and the free "Family Upgrades" for the Track Pack and Racing Car Pack.

== Reception ==
Reception

Aggregate score
Aggregator	Score
Metacritic	84/100

Review scores
Publication	Score
1Up.com	A−
Computer and Video Games	8/10
Destructoid	10/10
Edge	7/10
Eurogamer	9/10
Famitsu	37/40
Game Informer	9/10
GamePro	4.5/5 stars
GameRevolution	A−
GameSpot	8.0/10
GamesRadar+	7/10
GamesTM	9/10
GameTrailers	9/10
IGN	8.5/10
Joystiq	4/5
Play	9.2/10
PSM3	9.1/10

Awards
Publication	Award
Official PS3 Magazine	Gold
GamePro	Editor's Choice
PlayGamer	Editor's Choice
PSX Extreme	Best Sound Effects of the Year
Gamescom 2010	Best Console Game
Tokyo Game Show	Future Game Award
Play	Technical Merit, Editor's Choice
GameTrailers	Best Racing Game
GameSpot	Best Driving Game, Readers' Choice
GameRevolution	Best Racing Game
PlayStation LifeStyle	Best Racing Game of 2010
PlayStation Universe	Best Driving Game
PlayStation UK	Obsession Confessions
Golden Joystick Awards	Best Racing Game

Gran Turismo 5 received "generally favorable" reviews, according to review aggregator website Metacritic.

The driving physics of GT5 received high praise. Car and Driver stated that "its physics model is extremely realistic. The behavior of the cars is startlingly faithful to their real-life counterparts, so they respond accordingly to poor driving and when you miss critical braking and turn-in points". Destructoid commented that "Turning and braking feel incredibly natural. You get a real sense of how slamming on the brakes throws the car's weight forward. Handling actually feels like car handling, and not some once-removed, through-a-game-controller attempt". IGN declared that "its handling model proudly restores Gran Turismo upon the driving throne".

The number of cars, tracks and features was praised. GamePro called it "an amazingly deep racing game that offers an almost mind-boggling amount of racing challenges, cars, tracks and features". Destructoid stated that "the numbers that Sony and Polyphony Digital have been throwing at us don't even begin to cover how vast the game is. The game's GT Mode has so many menus and sub-menus that it took me a full workday to completely go through them all, and that's not even counting a separate arcade mode, a track maker, a video collection and much more. It's every bit of the racing world all in one place, on one disc. The word 'comprehensive' doesn't even feel big enough". The inclusion of a track generator, karts, licensed World Rally Championship and NASCAR vehicles was also received positively, as was the new dynamic time and weather effects.

The addition of online racing was positively received. The online races were credited for being smooth without any noticeable lag and for not showing any drop off in quality, as well as for providing fun racing. GamePro concluded that the "superb online mode gives the game incredible longevity".

The graphics received positive reviews with reviewers praising the lighting effects as well as interior and exterior details of premium cars, stating that Photo Mode showed off their detailed graphical design very well. CGMagazine claimed that the detail of the games track's combined with the weather effects add up to "some breathtaking driving experiences with sunset on the horizon and dirt being kicked up around your car, or rain drops hitting the windshield in cockpit view with uncanny realism". Destructoid commented positively on the lightning, weather and particle effects, stating that "watching snow blow onto and over the windshield was so lovely that it was almost distracting. The way a nighttime fog soaks up headlights looked impossibly realistic. Streetlights shine on a glossy, wet road, and later, raindrops streak by as you hit 200 mph. In the desert, dust kicks up in a rally race. High beams catch the dust, with the tops of the surrounding trees barely lit by the setting sun". The detail of standard cars were criticized as they lacked fully detailed cockpit views, looked like up-scaled versions taken from Gran Turismo 4 and did not keep up to the level of detail found in the premium models. GT5 has been criticized for frame-rate drops and screen tearing. The problems are most noticeable when many cars are on screen with rain or smoke visible.

The newly included damage feature received criticism for having limited effect on car performance (however a later update added the ability to "turn on" full damage and tire/fuel depletion). The AI was also criticized for still making CPU-drivers brake unexpectedly and not being aware of the player's car on the track, just as in previous games in the series. IGN called it "the series' now trademark zombie A.I.".

The game's sound was praised. Arnold Katayev, reviewer of PSX Extreme, stated that "Gran Turismo 5 actually sounds fantastic. Having sampled a number of cars in the game that I either own, drive frequently, or have driven numerous times before, I've verified how they all sound. My 350Z sounded pitch perfect as you start it up upon selecting it. Same goes for my 370Z, it sounds spot on. Even a bunch of the standard cars sounded good, and sound even better with a few exhaust mods", while TweakTown said that "some cars just sounding flat when you feel they shouldn't, and others just sending a shiver up your spine as you hit redline". Gamingreality awarded the sound 9/10, stating that "the sounds are clear, crisp, and distinct. The engine sounds are great and make you feel like the car is actually near you. The engine sounds on premium cars change when you make adjustments to it just like in real life".

During the 14th Annual Interactive Achievement Awards, the Academy of Interactive Arts & Sciences nominated Gran Turismo 5 for "Racing Game of the Year" and "Outstanding Achievement in Soundtrack".

=== Sales ===
In the UK, the chains Gamestation and Game between them opened around 100 stores at midnight on the day of release, so that customers could buy the game ahead of their normal 9am. EB Games and JB Hi-Fi in Australia did the same thing. The game was the multi-format number one for the week, despite only having been on sale for 2 days.

In Japan, Gran Turismo 5 debuted in the software chart at number one, and this helped PS3 console sales more than double for the week ending November 28, 2010.

As of March 2013, Gran Turismo 5 sold over 10 million units. For 13 days, 423,000 copies of the game were sold per day. Gran Turismo 5 was the best-selling video game for the PlayStation 3 until 2013 when it was beaten by Grand Theft Auto V. The Gran Turismo series as a whole has now totalled more than 65 million units sold so far worldwide and remains the highest-selling PlayStation-exclusive franchise of all time. According to Polyphony Digital, Gran Turismo 5 shifted 6.37 million units between its launch in November and the end of 2010. As of September 2012, Sony shipped 9.19 million units of Gran Turismo 5. Despite a late release in 2010, Gran Turismo 5 managed to become the 7th best selling PlayStation 3 title in the US, making the game the 2nd best selling exclusive of the year. Gran Turismo 5 also became the best selling PlayStation 3 exclusive in Europe, including the UK.

Sales have exceeded 10 million units (of which, almost half were in Europe), this was announced during the 15th anniversary event at Silverstone, held on May 15, 2013. The game holds the record for the longest chart run for a racing game.

=== Awards ===
- Golden Joystick Awards 2011 – Best Racing Game (Won)
- Game Revolution – 17th best PS3 game of all time

== Celebrity appearances ==
Four-time NASCAR Cup champion Jeff Gordon appears in the game as a mentor to the player, guiding them in the skills of slipstreaming specific to the sport. Nine-time rally world champion Sébastien Loeb and four-time F1 world champion Sebastian Vettel appear in similar roles in their portions of the game, providing advice and encouragement in a series of challenges. Other cars in the game are named after rally driver Tommi Mäkinen, drivers Carl Edwards and Kyle Busch, and personalities Shuichi Shigeno and Jay Leno. Voice overs were recorded by Justin Bell, Tony Jardine and Robert Reid. One of the game's testers, listed in the credits, was Tomei Sports/Porsche racing driver Takashi Ohi.

On September 5, 2011, Martin Brundle and Jonathan Legard commentated on a race between David Coulthard, driving a real Mercedes-Benz SLS AMG around the Top Gear test track, and 6 leading Gran Turismo players, racing on a console at Mercedes-Benz World. Coulthard won, with Jason Birt trailing by half a second. Reggie Yates, Pollyanna Woodward and Mike Bushell also took part in the race, but did not qualify for the leader board. Coulthard's lap was subsequently available to download for players to race against.

In partnership with Alpinestars, a downloadable pack released in October 2011 features replica helmets and overalls worn by drivers such as Tony Stewart, Jimmie Johnson, Petter Solberg, Mikko Hirvonen and The Stig.

In January 2013, Johnny Herbert mentored 6 players in a primetime ITV4 reality series, with the aim of taking them to the Dubai 24 Hour race as real drivers. Other countries in Europe had heats mentored by drivers Vitantonio Liuzzi and Sébastien Buemi.
