= Car controls =

Car parts used to control the vehicle

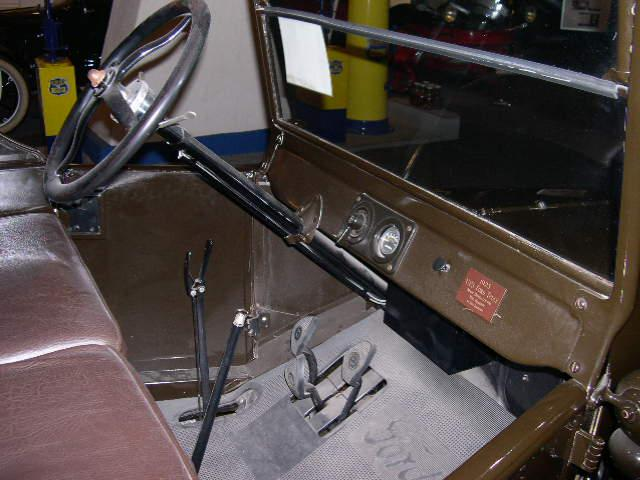
In the Ford Model T, the standing pedals control the two forward gears (left pedal), reverse (center pedal), and the brake (right pedal). The steering-column levers control ignition timing (left) and the throttle (right). The large hand-levers set the rear-wheel parking brake and put the transmission in neutral (left) and control an after-market 2-speed transmission adapter (right).

Car controls are the components in automobiles and other powered road vehicles, such as trucks and buses, used for driving and parking.

Controls such as steering wheels and pedals existed in some steam-powered road vehicles of the 1830s, evolved through the nineteenth century and were carried over to motor cars. Other controls have been developed and adapted to the demands of drivers. For example, manual transmissions became less common as technology relating to automatic transmissions and electrification advanced.

Earlier versions of headlights and signal lights were fueled by acetylene or oil. Acetylene was preferred to oil, because its flame is resistant to both wind and rain. Acetylene headlights, which gave a strong green-tinted light, were popular until after World War I; even though the first electric headlights were introduced in 1898 (and those were battery-powered), it wasn't until high-wattage bulbs and more powerful car electrical generating systems were developed in the late 1910s that electric lighting systems entirely superseded acetylene.

== Steering ==
Archetypal steam drag (small towing vehicle) of 1834 with a steering wheel and throttle pedal

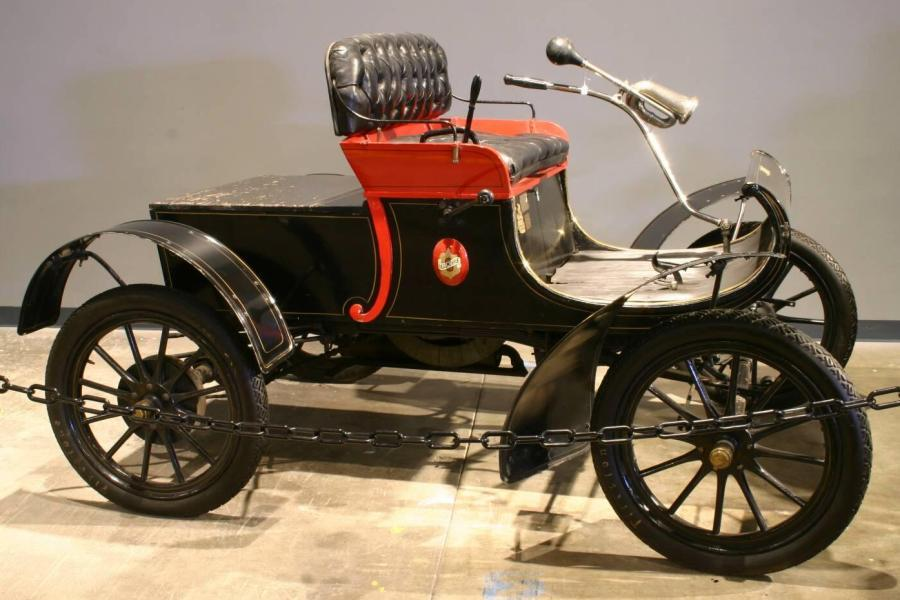
1904 Oldsmobile Curved Dash with tiller steering

With a few specialised exceptions, modern cars use a steering wheel. This first appeared in the early nineteenth century on steam road vehicles, notably the steam omnibuses of Walter Hancock from 1829 onwards. Horizontal wheels with at least one handle and vertical ship's wheels with six handles were widely used on steam road vehicles from the 1850s onwards, e.g. those of Amédée Bollée.

The first internal-combustion-engined cars (Benz, Daimler, Peugeot) used steering handles which rotated a vertical spindle. These were essentially the same as those on the first steam carriages of the 1820s and are used in the same way as the handles on a horizontal wheel. They relied on the same mechanisms to achieve mechanical advantage as a steering wheel: rack-and-pinion (Benz) or chain over a small sprocket at the spindle with a larger diameter at the axle (Daimler and Peugeot).

Panhard et Levassor.was an influential exception in using a tiller from 1891. Its mechanical advantage came from the leverage of the distance from its handle to the pivot, at or near the front axle. In 1894, Alfred Vacheron took part in the Paris–Rouen race on a 4 hp Panhard in which he had installed an inclined steering wheel. That is believed to be the first application of a steering wheel in an internal-combustion-engined car. In 1898, steering wheels became a standard feature of Panhard et Levassor cars. They were introduced in the U.S. by Packard in 1899, and by 1908 were on most models.

Power steering helps drivers steer by augmenting the driver's steering effort. Power steering has used hydraulics to reduce a driver's steering effort. However, hydraulic steering is being replaced by electric power steering, because it eliminates the hydraulic pump, and increases fuel efficiency.

== Braking ==
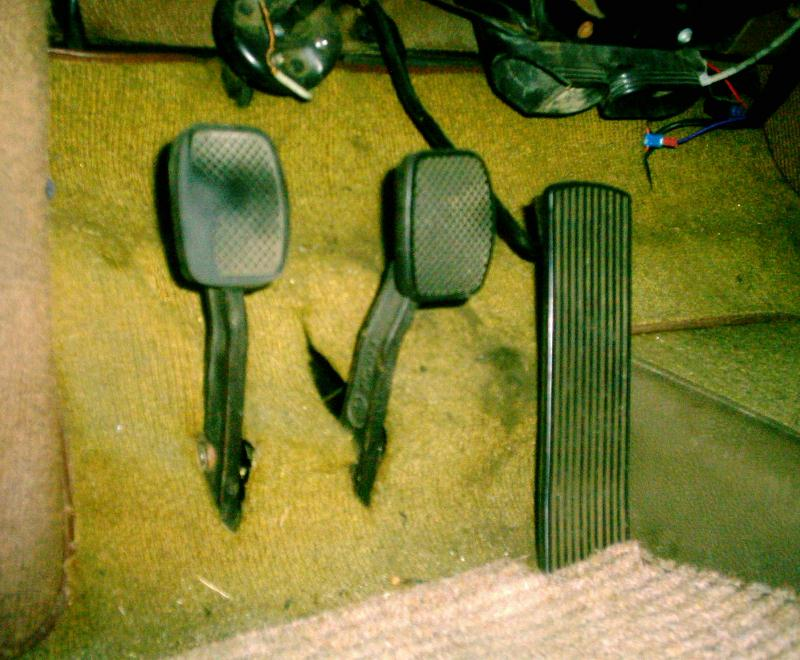
Standing pedals in a Saab Sonett. Pedals either hang from the bulkhead or stand on the floor. The arrangement is the same for both right- and left-hand traffic.

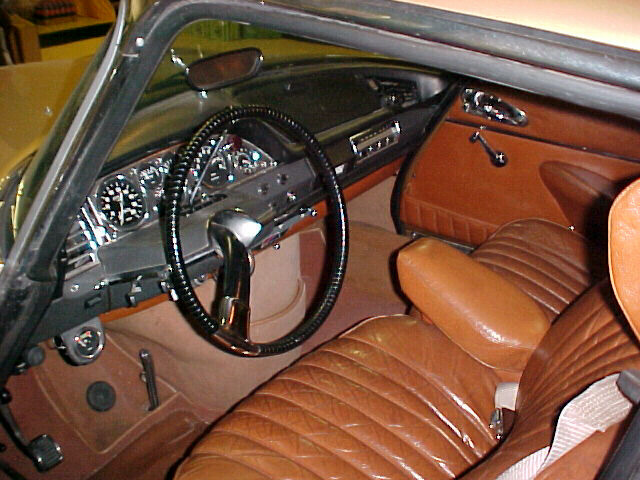
1969 Citroen DS Pallas interior with hydraulic gear selector mounted top right of steering column with a single spoke steering wheel. Note the so-called mushroom brake pedal. (The pedal on the left is the parking brake).

In modern cars the four-wheel braking system is controlled by a pedal to the left of the accelerator pedal.

There is usually also a parking brake which operates the rear brakes only (or less commonly, the front brakes only, as in the Saab 99 and in the Citroën Xantia). This has traditionally been operated by a lever between the front seats called a hand brake, but also appeared as a lever between the driver's seat and the door (as in the Porsche 911), a knob pulled away from the dash (as in the Volkswagen Transporter), a foot-operated pedal (as in the Nissan Leaf), and other less common arrangements. All of these controls pull on a spring-loaded cable and are held in place with a ratcheting mechanism until released.

In the 2000s, direct-acting electronic parking brakes controlled by a switch (as in the Volkswagen eGolf) are becoming more common, replacing cable-actuated mechanical systems.

In rallying there is often a hydraulic handbrake for the rear wheels, operated by a long, vertical lever extending to near the steering wheel. This is designed to facilitate handbrake turns rather than for parking, so lacks a ratcheting mechanism.

== Throttle control ==
The throttle, which controls fuel and air supply to the engine and is also known as the "accelerator" or "gas pedal", is normally the right-most floor pedal. It has a fail-safe design – a spring, which returns it to the idle position when not depressed by the driver.

Normally the throttle and brake are operated by the right foot, while the clutch is operated by the left foot. However, some drivers sometimes mistake the accelerator for the brake, leading to sudden unintended acceleration and causing 16,000 accidents per year in the US. There are also drivers who intentionally practice left-foot braking.

Early cars had a hand lever to control the throttle, either directly, or by controlling an engine speed governor which in turn controlled both the throttle and timing. In 1900, the Wilson-Pilcher car was introduced in Britain which had a hand controlled speed governor, and a foot throttle which could override the action of the governor. Unlike modern throttle pedals, this could be raised to accelerate the car or depressed to slow it, "and thus quick accelerations or retardations can be effected" without interfering with the governed speed set using the hand control. The combination of governed engine speed with foot throttle override is in many ways similar to a modern cruise control. In spite of this development, steering column mounted hand throttles remained common, especially in mass-produced cars such as the Ford Model T. Later cars used both a foot pedal and a hand lever to set the minimum throttle. The 1918 Stutz Bearcat had a central throttle pedal with the clutch and brake to the right and left. Modern cruise control was invented in 1948.

== Transmission ==
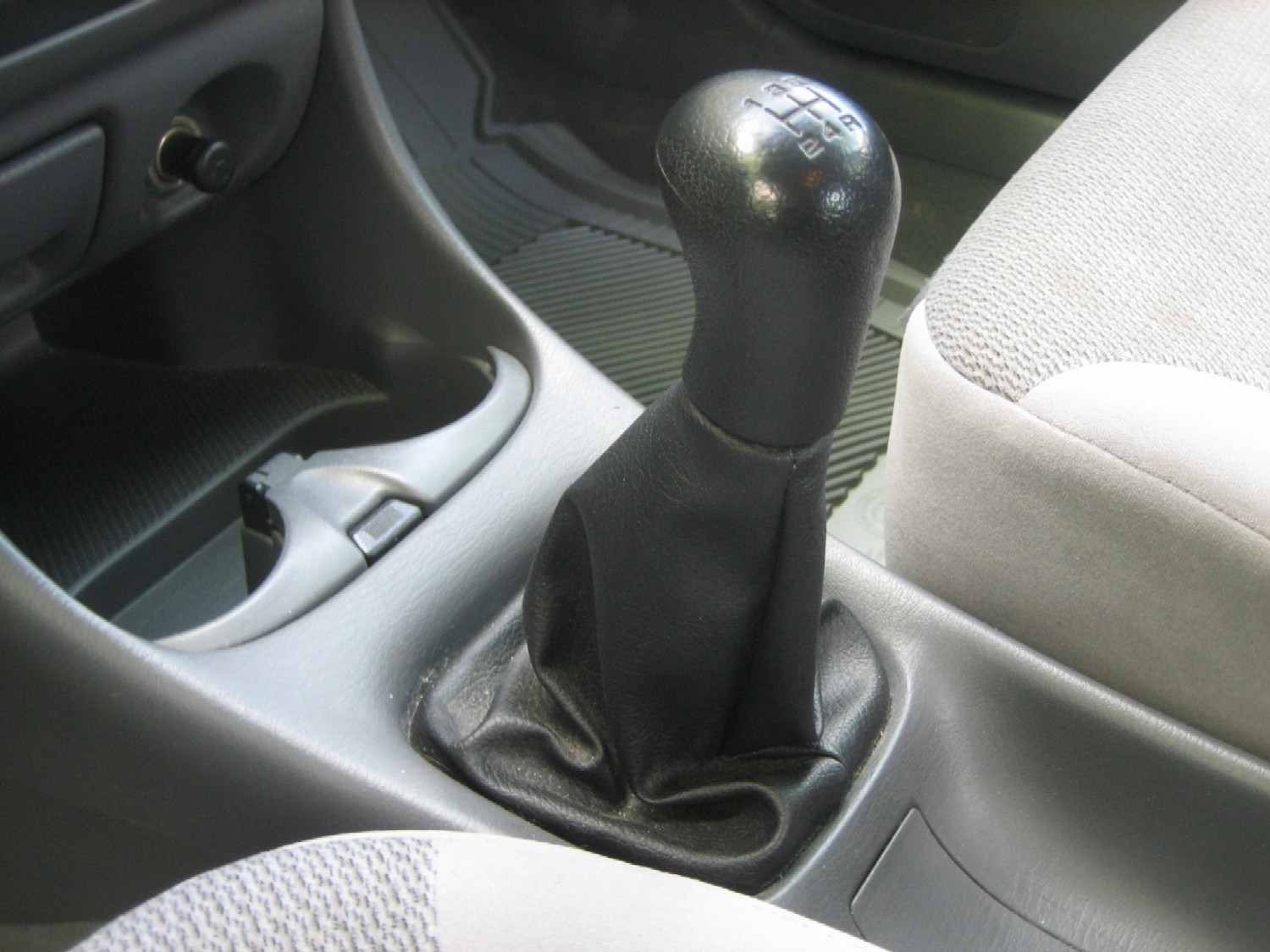
A floor-mounted gear lever in a modern passenger car with a manual transmission

Vehicles that generate power with an internal combustion engine (ICE) are generally equipped with a transmission or gearbox to change the speed-torque ratio and the direction of travel. This does not usually apply to electric vehicles because their motors can drive the vehicle both forward and backward from zero speed. In some four-wheel drive vehicles there is a gear lever that engages a low-ratio gearbox. Other levers may switch between two- and four-wheel drive and differential locks.

Some cars have a freewheel that disengages the driveshaft from the driven shaft. This happens when the driven shaft rotates faster than the driveshaft. For example, Saab used a freewheel system in their earlier vehicles, to let the engine disconnect from the transmission while coasting. This was a feature added because of the limited lubrication in the two-stroke engine. A petroil-lubricated two-stroke requires lubrication according to its speed, but provides this lubrication according to the amount of its throttle opening. Where the engine operates at high RPM and low throttle (such as when coasting down a long hill), the lubrication provided may be inadequate. With the freewheel, a coasting engine could reduce its speed to idling, thus requiring only the small lubrication available from the closed, coasting, throttle. Freewheeling can also be used to help reduce high exhaust gas temperatures in two stroke models caused by prolonged use of the throttle at higher RPM.

Freewheeling was retained in the four-stroke variant, until the end of production and in the Saab 99 with the 1709 cc Triumph engine. A minor drawback to the freewheel, particularly for drivers unfamiliar with the Saab, is that it makes engine braking unavailable although it could be manually engaged or disengaged by a control in the foot-well. Fixed wheel engagement, using the foot, could be difficult, as it involved pulling a 'T handle' intended for manual operation. Some cars, such as the Rover P4, include a manual switch to engage or disengage the freewheel.

=== Manual ===
Manual transmission is also known as a manual gearbox, stick shift, standard, and stick. Most automobile manual transmissions have several gear ratios that are chosen by locking selected gear pairs to the output shaft inside the transmission. Manual transmissions feature a driver-operated clutch pedal and a hand-operated gear stick or shift lever, or, on a motorcycle; a hand-operated clutch lever, and a foot-operated gearshift lever. Historically, cars had a manual overdrive switch.

=== Semi-automatic / Clutchless manual ===
Semi-automatic transmissions are mechanically the same as a conventional manual transmission, but do not have a manually operated clutch mechanism; instead facilitating the driver, by using automation system to control the clutch. These systems still require the driver's input and involvement for manually changing gear ratios, though, and will not change gear automatically for the driver.

=== Automatic ===
The desire for driver convenience led to the widespread implementation of the now-popular hydraulic automatic transmission design in the 1940s, followed by the first mass-production continuously variable transmission (CVT), the Variomatic, in 1958. Automatic transmission with manumatic (manual) gear shifting controls started to appear on mass-production cars in the early-1990s, starting with Porsche's Tiptronic system. Later, the computer-controlled, single-clutch, automated manual transmission, pioneered by BMW and Ferrari, began appearing on mass-production automobiles in the mid-1990s; one example is Alfa Romeo's Selespeed, which is the same system used by Ferrari and BMW. The first mass-production dual-clutch transmission design was introduced with the 4th-generation Volkswagen Golf R32 in 2003, with the direct-shift gearbox.

Some automatic transmission vehicles have extra controls that modify the choices made by the transmission system. These controls depend on the engine and road speed. Automatic gear selectors generally have a straight pattern, beginning at the most forward position with park, and running through reverse, neutral, drive, and then to the lower gears.

== Signals and lighting ==
Cars have controls for headlamps, fog lamps, turn signals, and other automotive lighting. Turn signals are activated by the driver to alert other drivers of their intent to turn or change lanes. While the modern turn signal was patented in 1938, electric turn-signal lights date back to 1907.

As of 2013, most countries require turn signals to be included on all vehicles driven on public roadways. The turn signal lever is usually activated by a horizontal lever protruding from the steering column.

== Instrumentation ==
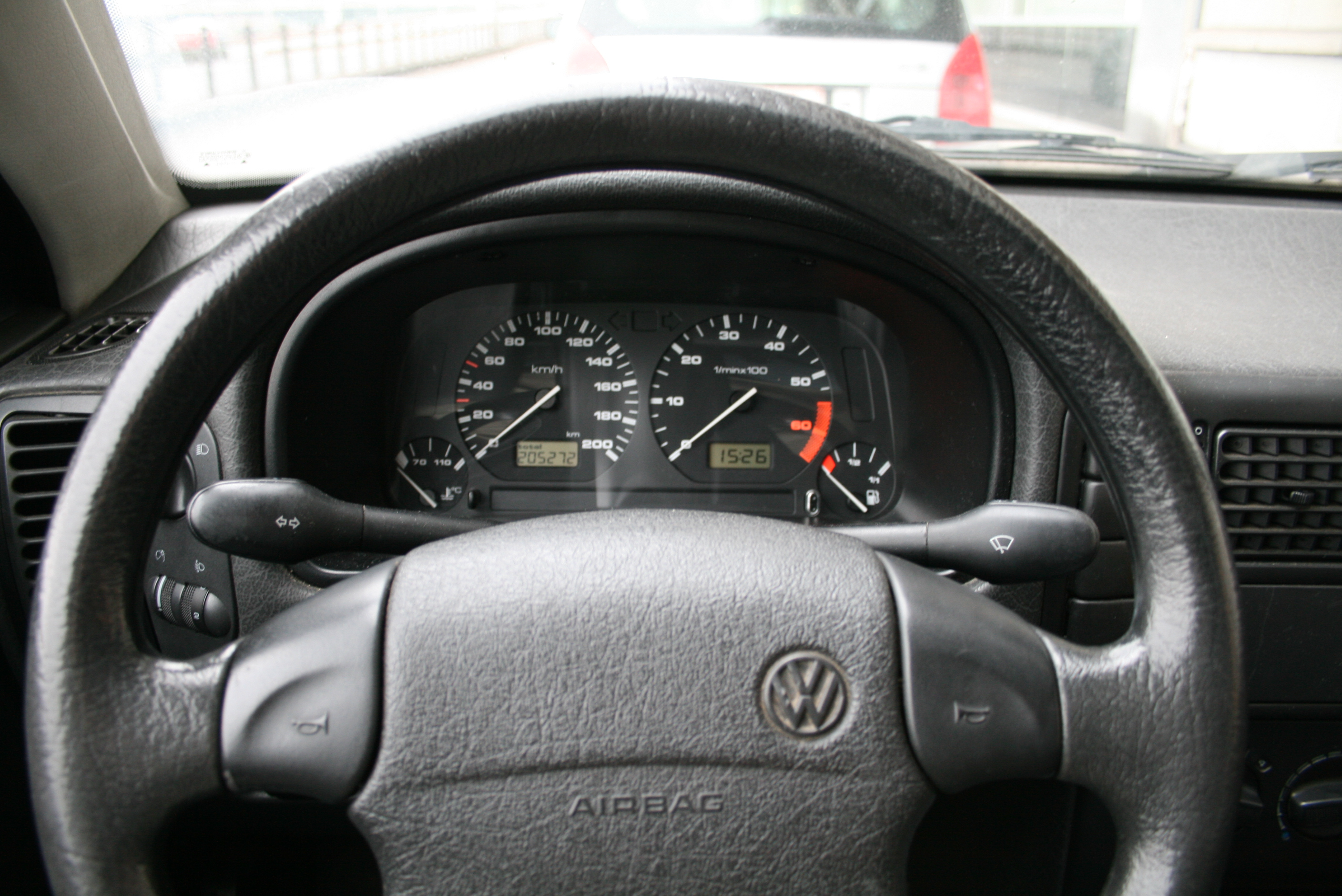
Volkswagen Polo dashboard with, left to right, controls for lighting and the horn, gauges for engine temperature, vehicle and engine speed, fuel level, and the windshield wiper control.

Vehicles are generally equipped with a variety of instruments mounted on the dashboard to indicate driving parameters and the state of the mechanics. The placement of the instruments can vary. While they are usually mounted behind the steering wheel, they may also be mounted centrally below the windshield, or integrated into the center stack above the climate control and audio system. The standard gauges found on road vehicles include the following:

- Speedometer
- Tachometer
- Odometer
- Fuel gauge
- Engine temperature gauge
- Ammeter
- Oil pressure gauge

These gauges are supplemented by an assortment of warning lights that indicate the currently selected transmission gear mode, the generic check engine light, and the current status of various vehicle systems.

The layout and design of these instruments have evolved over the years by being implemented as digital readouts rather than the traditional analog dial-type indicators. Depending on the type of vehicle, more specialized instruments may be used such as a trip computer, fuel economy gauge, or battery level display.

== Starting and running the engine ==
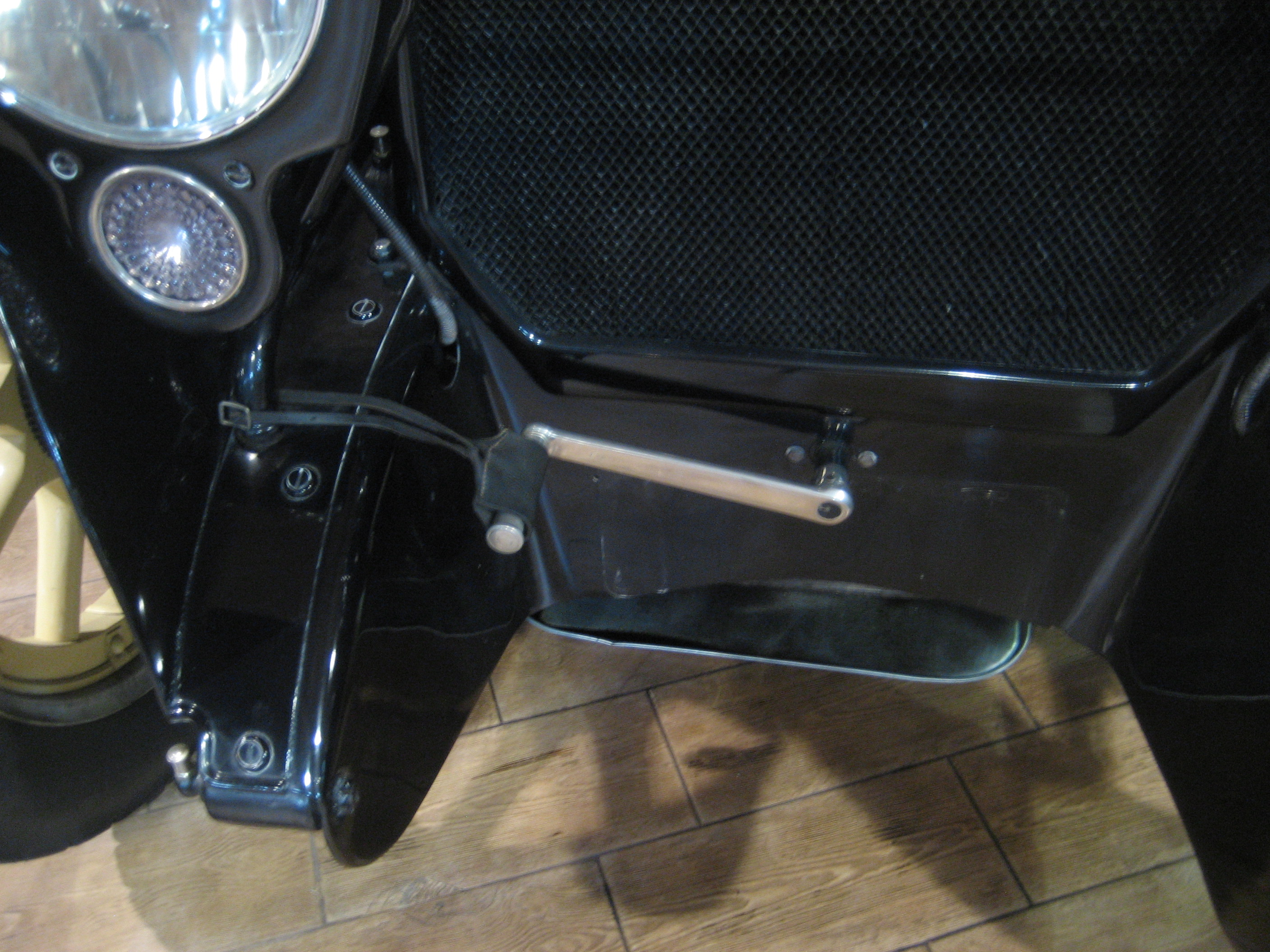
1917 Packard crank holder

Before the appearance of the starter motor, engines were started by various difficult and dangerous methods. These methods included: wind-up springs, gunpowder cylinders, and human-powered techniques such as a removable hand-crank. In 1896, the first electric starter was installed on an Arnold, one of the first motor cars manufactured in the United Kingdom. Charles Kettering and Henry Leland later invented and filed U.S. patent 1,150,523 for the first electric starter in America in 1911. In 1912, the Cadillac Model Thirty became the first American car to have a starter installed.

Before Chrysler's 1949 innovation of the key-operated combination ignition-starter switch, the starter was operated by the driver pressing a button that was mounted on the floor or dashboard. This type of control has now returned with the use of keyless entry. Early Chevrolet cars had the starter pedal to the right of the accelerator, with a secondary throttle control knob on the dashboard because it was difficult to operate the starter pedal and pump the gas pedal at the same time.

Some other historical engine controls, which are automated in modern passenger cars, were the choke valve, ignition timing, and spark arrestor.

== Additional controls ==
In the past, all cars had manual controls for starting and running the engine. Now, modern cars not only have automated controls, but they also have controls that are not directly used to drive the vehicle. These controls include air conditioning, navigation systems, on-board computers, in-car entertainment, windscreen wiper, and touchscreen panels.

These controls vary in scope and design between different types of cars. They may also be located and operated differently in other road vehicles such as motorcycles, where the throttle is controlled by a hand lever and the gear shift is operated by a pedal. Some types of vehicle controls are found in rail vehicles. For example, some trams and light rail vehicles like the PCC streetcar use automobile-style pedals to control the speed.

In Formula One auto racing, many vehicle parameters can be set by the driver during a race. Controls for these are mounted on the steering wheel, and can include controls for: brake balance, differential, ignition timing, regenerative brake, rev limiter, and others.

== See also ==
- History of the automobile
