= André van Schaik =

Professor of electrical engineering

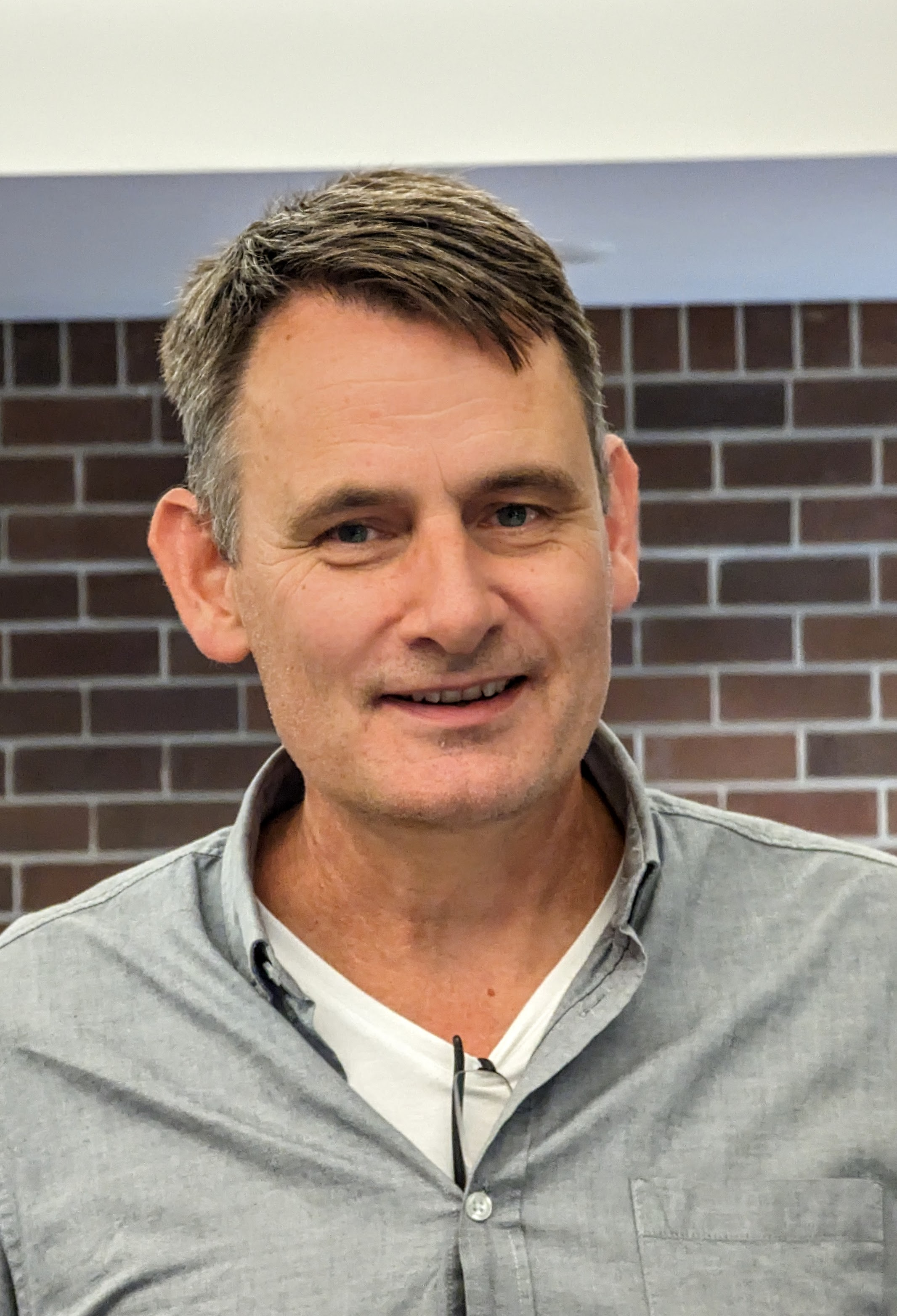
- André van Schaik
- Education: University of Twente (BSc); École Polytechnique Fédérale de Lausanne (PhD)
- Scientific career
- Fields: Neuromorphic engineering Computational neuroscience Neurophysiology
- Workplaces: University of Manchester; University of Sydney; Western Sydney University; Swiss Center for Electronics and Microtechnology
- Thesis: Analogue VLSI building blocks for an electronic auditory pathway (1988)
- Doctoral advisor: Eric Vittoz

André van Schaik is a Professor in the Department of Computer Science at the University of Manchester where he holds the Furber Chair in Neuromorphic Systems Engineering. He previously served as a Professor at Western Sydney University, and director of its International Centre for Neuromorphic Systems in Penrith, Sydney. He was named a Fellow of the Institute of Electrical and Electronics Engineers (IEEE) in 2014 "for contributions to neuromorphic circuits and systems".

== Education ==
Van Schaik received the Master of Science degree in electrical engineering from the University of Twente, Enschede, the Netherlands, in 1990, and his PhD degree from the Swiss Federal Institute of Technology (EPFL), Lausanne, Switzerland, in 1998.

As an undergraduate student, van Schaik was an intern at the Institute for Microelectronics Stuttgart, where he researched limits to the fault tolerance of feedforward neural networks, which led to a widely cited scientific publication.

After completing his MSc he worked as an engineer at the Swiss Center for Electronics and Microtechnology, where he designed a neuromorphic optical motion-tracking chip for the Logitech TrackMan Marble, which came on the market in 1994; as of 2023 that device is still sold, still with his original chip design, nearly 30 years old.

In 1994 he started his PhD research in the MANTRA Centre for Neuro-Mimetic Systems at the Swiss Federal Institute of Technology (EPFL), Lausanne, Switzerland under supervision of Eric Vittoz, a pioneer of low-power Very-large-scale integration (VLSI) and co-developer of the EKV MOSFET model, and in close collaboration with Ray Meddis, who was an expert in computer simulation of the auditory pathway. His thesis led to a journal article with Meddis.

== Career and research ==
In 1998 van Schaik joined Simon Carlile's laboratory in the Department of Physiology at the University of Sydney as a postdoctoral research fellow, where he collaborated on the development of spatial audio over headphones, termed virtual auditory space.

In 1999 van Schaik joined the School of Electrical and Information Engineering at the University of Sydney as a senior lecturer, where he started the Computing and Audio Research Laboratory, together with Craig Jin. He was promoted to Reader in 2004. In 2003 he was awarded an Australian Research Council (ARC) Research Fellowship followed by an ARC Queen Elizabeth II Research Fellowship in 2008.

In 2011 he was appointed a research professor at Western Sydney University and leader of the Biomedical Engineering and Neuromorphic Systems (BENS) Research Program in the MARCS Institute for Brain, Behaviour, and Development. In 2018, he was appointed Director of the International Centre for Neuromorphic Systems, and in 2025 he was appointed Furber Chair in Computer Systems Engineering in the Department of Computer Science, University of Manchester.
