= Lewitt (company) =

Austrian audio equipment manufacturer

- Industry: Audio
- Founder: Roman Perschon
- Headquarters: Vienna, Austria
- Products: Microphones, Audio Interfaces, Software
- Website: www.lewitt-audio.com

Lewitt GmbH (stylized in all caps) is an Austrian audio equipment manufacturer based in Vienna. It produces a range of audio interfaces and microphones for studio, broadcast, and live sound applications.

== History ==
Lewitt was founded by Roman Perschon, who had previously worked at AKG. Its first product line was launched at the NAMM Show in Anaheim, California.

By the early 2020s, Lewitt had established offices in Europe, China, and the United States. In 2022, it opened a U.S. branch, Lewitt Inc. In 2020, Lewitt began “Project 1040,” an initiative to develop a new flagship microphone system in consultation with recording engineers. In June of 2020, Lewitt has partnered with Elgato, to develop the Wave microphones.

== Products ==
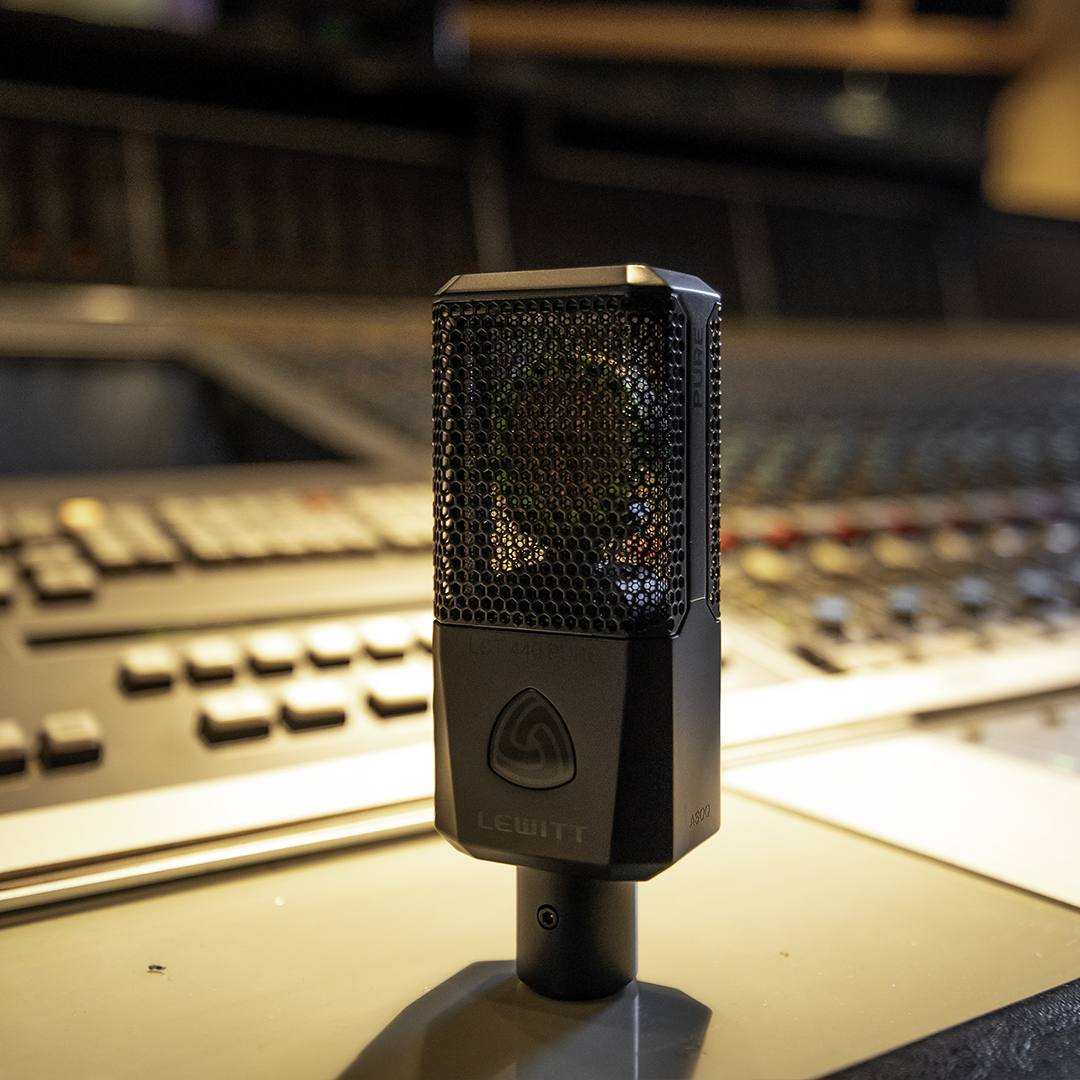
Lewitt's "LCT 440 PURE" recording microphone in front of a studio console

Lewitt's products include studio condenser microphones, live-performance microphones, and other audio equipment. The Lewitt Condenser Technology (LCT) series is its line of studio microphones. The LCT 640 TS is a dual-capsule condenser microphone that allows the polar pattern to be changed in post-production via software. The LCT 940 is a hybrid tube/FET microphone that combines valve and solid-state circuits. In 2022, Lewitt released the LCT 1040 microphone system.

Lewitt also manufactures instrument microphones, including the DTP 640 REX kick drum microphone and the LCT 040 Match small-diaphragm condensers. Lewitt has also expanded into digital audio interfaces with its Connect series, which includes the Connect 6 and Connect 2 USB-C interfaces.

In 2025, Lewitt has released Space Replicator, their first audio plugin. The plugin is suitable for audio mixing and mastering using virtual acoustic spaces.

== Recognition ==
Lewitt's products have received multiple industry awards. In 2013, the LCT 940 microphone won an Electronic Musician Editors' Choice Award. The following year, the MTP 940 CM was nominated for a TEC Award.

In November, 2019, the METAllliance, a group of music producers and engineers founded by Chuck Ainlay, George Massenburg, and many others, certified the LCT 640 TS microphone making Lewitt an official pro partner.

At the Sound On Sound Awards, Lewitt products were voted "Best Microphone" for three consecutive years: the LCT 1040 won in 2023, the Pure Tube model won in 2024, and the RAY microphone won in 2025. In 2025, its CONNECT 2 audio interfaces also received a "Highly Commended" distinction in their category at the same awards.
