= EKV =

EKV may refer to:

- Exoatmospheric Kill Vehicle, a non-explosive antimissile warhead
- Ekatarina Velika, a Serbian and Yugoslav rock band (1982–1994)
- EKV MOSFET Model, for electronic circuit simulation
