= Comparison of USB TV tuner sticks =

This is a comparison of USB TV tuner sticks.

== DVB-T2 devices - General information ==
This is a comparison of devices supporting the DVB-T2 standard.

Name	Manufacturer	Year introduced	DVB standards support	Included antenna type	USB	Number of tuners	Encrypted programs support	Notes
DVB-T210	August	circa 2012	DVB-T/DVB-T2	Mini				
DVB-T202	August	circa 2011	DVB-T/DVB-T2					
DVB-T230	August	circa 2011	DVB-T/DVB-T2	Mini				
MyGica DVB-T2 (T230)	Geniatech	circa 2016	DVB-T/DVB-T2					
EyeTV T2	EyeTV - Geniatech	circa 2012						
EyeTV T2 lite	EyeTV - Geniatech	circa 2016		Rod antenna			No	
TD310	AverMedia	circa 2015	DVB-T, DVB-T2, DVB-C		USB 2.0 / 3.0	1		
AVerTV Hybrid Volar T2	AverMedia	circa 2015	DVB-T, DVB-T2, DVB-C		USB 2.0 / 3.0	1		
WinTV-soloHD	Hauppauge	circa 2015	DVB-T, DVB-T2, DVB-C		USB 2.0 / 3.0	1		
WinTV-dualHD	Hauppauge		DVB-T, DVB-T2, DVB-C		USB 2.0 / 3.0	2		
CINERGY TC 2 Stick	TerraTec	circa 2016	DVB-T, DVB-T2, DVB-C		USB 2.0 / 3.0	1		

== See also ==
- TV tuner card
