= EyeTV =

European brand of TV tuners

- Product type: TV tuners
- Current owner: Geniatech
- Introduced: 2002
- Previous owners: Elgato Systems
- Website: www.geniatech.eu www.geniatech.us/eyetv/

EyeTV is a European brand of TV tuners that allow users to watch TV on various devices including computers and smartphones. The brand was introduced in 2002 by Elgato Systems and was sold to Geniatech in 2016.

== History ==
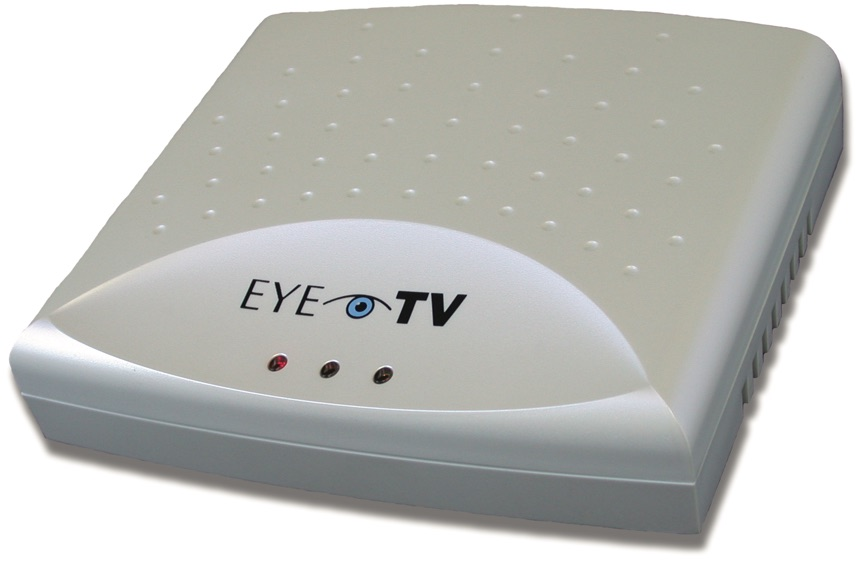
The first EyeTV model, introduced in 2002

The first EyeTV hardware device was introduced in November 2002. It was a small USB-powered device that contained a cable tuner and hardware encoder in order to convert television video into an MPEG-1 format for watching on a computer. It also had coaxial and RCA plugs to connect it with a VCR or camcorder. A 2002 article in Macworld said it was the "first step" in bridging computers and television, but at this point still had "some kinks".

The next iteration was released in 2004 and called EyeTV 200. EyeTV 200 introduced a digital remote control and converted video programming into the higher-quality MPEG-2 format. A Macworld review gave it 4 out of 5 stars for "very good" and emphasized the video quality and ease-of-use. A story in The Washington Post said it was more expensive than some alternatives, but worked on a Mac and had good-quality recordings. Also in 2004 the first EyeTV product for satellite television was introduced with the EyeTV 310, which was later discontinued and replaced with EyeTV Sat.

That same year a home media server called EyeHome was introduced. It had recording features similar to other EyeTV products, but was also intended for streaming a computer display to a television. It connected Mac computers and televisions that share the same home network. A review in Macworld gave it three stars or a "good" rating, saying that it was easy to install and worked well with Apple applications, but some aspects were quirky or frustrating. Sound and Vision Magazine said it was "pretty darn cool" and an easy, inexpensive way to get media server functionality, though there were some user interface quirks. It gave the product an 89 out of 100 rating.

By 2005, several other EyeTV products had been introduced, such as the EyeTV for DTT, the EyeTV EZ and the EyeTV Wonder. The EyeTV for DTT (digital terrestrial TV) is a small USB-powered device with an antenna for receiving free over-the-air television broadcasts. It received a 4 out of 5 rating in TechRadar. A review in The Register gave it an 85 percent rating. The Eye TV Wonder was only available from July 2005 to January 2006, before being discontinued and replaced with the Eye TV EZ. The EZ was a basic, entry-level product with an analog tuner for watching TV on a Mac computer.

In 2006, version 2.1 of the EyeTV software was introduced with a new user-interface, an integrated TV guide from TitanTV and compatibility with Apple remotes. The interface was similar to that of other Apple products. An article in Macworld praised the update and especially the new editing features, but said it had some quirks, such as a difficult-to-find Edit button. Some of the iHome software, which plays video content from a computer onto a television, was released in 2006 as a universal binary.

Version 2.4 of the EyeTV software was released in 2007 and added an export tool for Apple TV.

Version 3.0 of EyeTV was released in January 2008, and featured a new, iTunes-inspired interface, a customizable sidebar, ability to create Smart Playlists for organizing recordings, Smart Guides for automatically searching for and recording TV shows and a new EyeTV Sharing feature that allowed users to share their libraries with other EyeTV users on the same network.

EyeTV 3.0 through to EyeTV 3.4.3 were Universal applications that worked on both Intel and PowerPC Macintoshes running Mac OS X 10.4.11 or later, but from EyeTV 3.5 onwards only Intel processors were supported. The final version 3 release was EyeTV 3.6.8.

EyeTV 4.0.0 was released in December 2019 as a 64-bit application in order to be able to be run on Apple MacOS 10.15 onwards as from that point Apple no longer supported 32-bit applications. EyeTV 4 was a paid upgrade and EyeTV 3 License Keys did not work with EyeTV 4.

Further development of EyeTV has apparently ceased since the final build of EyeTV 4.0.0 (8532) was released in July 2023 and there have been no updates since then.

Even though EyeTV 4.0.0 is a 64-bit application it was written for Intel processors only, and so requires the Rosetta translation environment to run on Apple Macintosh computers with Apple Silicon. Apple has announced that from MacOS 28, expected to be released late in 2027, it will no longer support Intel applications via Rosetta, which would result in EyeTV 4.0.0 ceasing to work on MacOS 28 or later unless an updated version is released.

=== Exit from the ATSC tuner market ===
As of February 2015, EyeTV no longer sells ATSC tuners. (ATSC is the digital television standard used in the United States, Canada, South Korea, Mexico and the Dominican Republic.) The Elgato web site explicitly declined to give a reason: "Elgato Technical Support is not able to comment on this business decision."

In February 2016, Elgato sold EyeTV to Geniatech Europe GmbH, a wholly owned subsidiary of Shenzhen Geniatech Inc., Ltd. which resulted in Geniatech taking over the complete EyeTV product line.

Geniatech no longer sells the Turbo.264 HD software but still sells digital tuner sticks based on the European DVB-T standard as well as the EyeTV 4.0.0 software for Apple Macintosh despite it not being updated for over 3 years. The Thunderbolt products remained with Elgato until they were sold to Corsair Gaming in 2018.

== Products ==
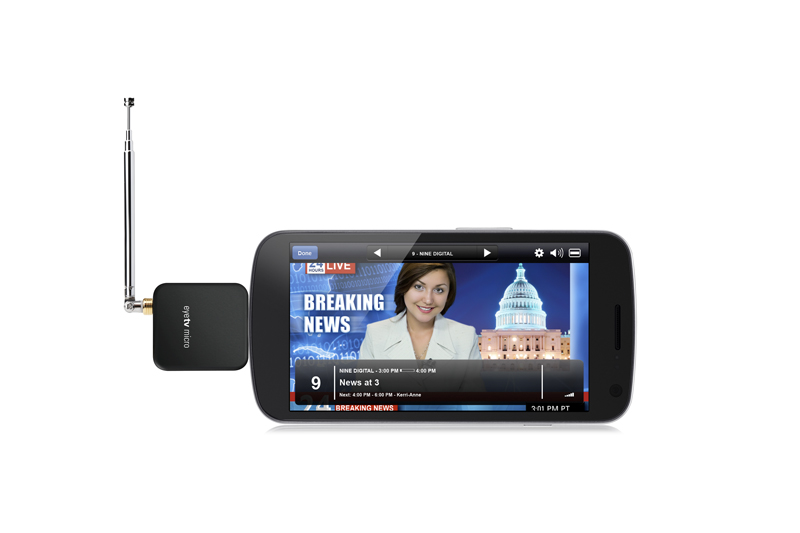
The EyeTV Micro product for Android devices

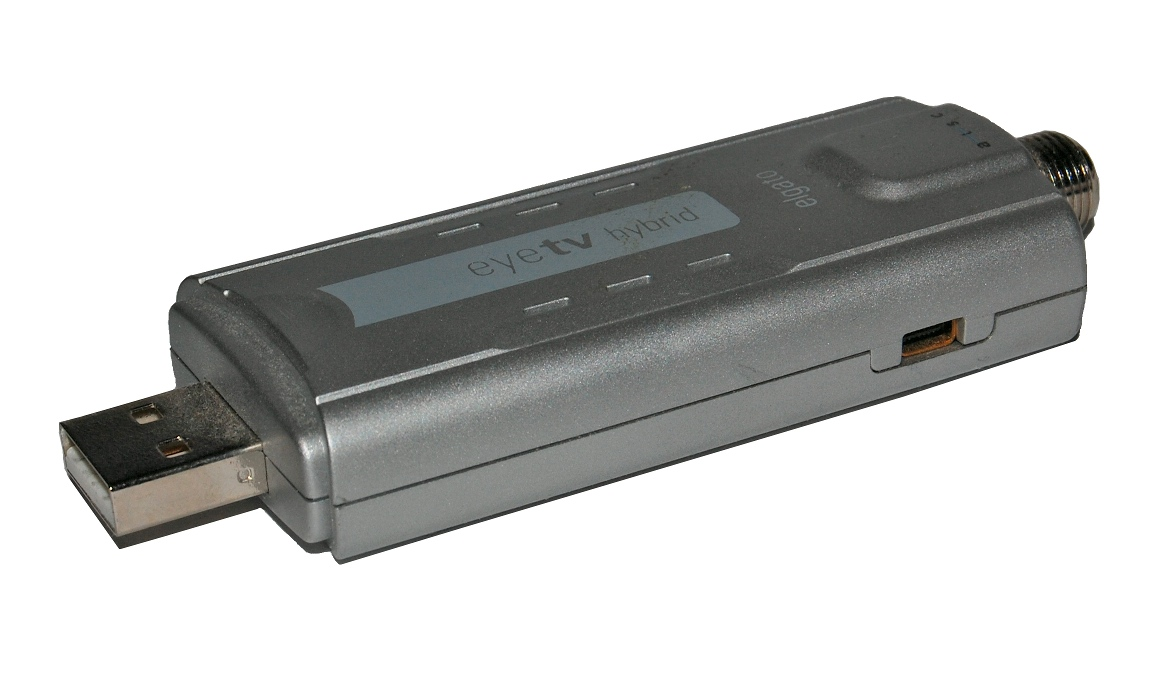
The EyeTV Hybrid

=== Over the air ===
The EyeTV Diversity is a USB-powered device with dual tuners for receiving over the air television broadcasts. The tuners can be used simultaneously for an optimized signal, or one tuner can be used to record a channel, while another is used to watch a separate show. Diversity was first introduced in November 2006. A driver in 2009 added compatibility with Windows 7. A review in TechRadar gave EyeTV Diversity five out of five stars. PC Advisor and Pocket-Lint both gave it four out of five stars.

EyeTV Hybrid, which can pick up digital or analog television broadcasts, was first released in early 2009. A CNET review said the device was easy and effective to use, but that buffering was often too slow to make watching live TV practical. Macworld said EyeTV's "core strength" was recording scheduled TV shows. A review in PC Magazine gave the product 3.5 out of 5 stars. The review said it "works exceptionally well" but doesn't come with Windows software.

=== Satellite ===
In June 2010, the EyeTV HD product for recording high-definition cable and satellite programming was introduced. Because cable and satellite signals are encoded, the device must be connected to a tuner from a television provider. Then it provides remote controls, recording and DVR-functionality from a connected computer. A Macworld review gave the product four out of five stars. A review in Laptop Magazine gave EyeTV HD 3.5 out of 5 stars. It said the interface was intuitive and the video quality was good, but noted it was only compatible with Macs.

The EyeTV Netstream 4Sat has four satellite tuners, allowing four channels to be watched simultaneously from different devices. It was introduced in 2014. A review in Macworld gave it 5 out of 5 stars. The review said Elgato had addressed some of the limitations of prior EyeTV satellite tuners like Netstream Sat/DTT. Pocket-Lint gave it 4.5 out of 5 stars CNET gave it five stars. The EyeTV Sat product, which receives free-to-air television, was introduced in Europe in late 2009. The Register gave it an 80% rating, saying that it "works well" and that the documentation did not make it clear how to install the Apple and Windows versions of the software.

=== Software ===
The EyeTV software was updated to version 3.0 in 2008. 3.0 made user interface improvements, such as being able to mark favorites or automatically record shows in a series. A review in TechRadar gave it 4.5 out of 5 stars. The review noted that EyeTV was the de facto software for TV and computer video integration and praised its new features, but said it was expensive when purchased separately. A 2007 article in MacLife said their "top picks" for USB-powered tuners were those using the EyeTV software, such as the EyeTV hybrid or EyeTV 250. In addition to Elgato's EyeTV line of consumer devices, other brands such as Terratec and Miglia used the EyeTV software in their products through licensing agreements with Elgato.

=== Mobile ===
The EyeTV W was introduced in November 2013. It is a small 44 gram device that receives free digital over-the-air television broadcasts and makes it available to portable devices through a wireless hot spot. A review in Macworld said it was portable, easy to use and had good battery life, but noted that users can't connect to other WiFi networks and watch TV at the same time. It gave the product 4 out of 5 stars. An EyeTV Mobile device for iPads was announced at the 2011 International Franchise Conference as the first tuner for the new Freeview system in the United Kingdom.

Subsequently the EyeTV Mobile and EyeTV Micro products were released for iPhones and Android respectively. The Micro and Mobile allow users to watch or record free over-the-air television programming from their smartphone. Reviews of the mobile products ranged from 2 out of 5 stars by CNET 4 out of 5 stars in Macworld and 3 out of 5 stars in PC Magazine. There is also an EyeTV iPhone app that allows the user to watch their recorded shows on their iPhone, control their EyeTV recordings or watch live TV while connected to Wi-Fi. A compact version for laptops, the EyeTV GO, was introduced in May 2014.
