= MOZA (brand) =

Chinese electronics brand

- Type: Brand (subsidiary)
- Industry: Technology; Consumer electronics Gaming peripherals
- Headquarters: China
- Products: Sim-racing hardware Flight simulation gear Motion simulation hardware Farming and truck simulation controls Software: MOZA Pit House, MOZA Cockpit, MOZA Motion Manager
- Parent: Shenzhen Gudsen Technology Co., Ltd.
- Website: mozaracing.com

MOZA is a simulation hardware and software brand of Shenzhen Gudsen Technology Co., Ltd. Its products cover sim racing, flight simulation, motion systems, truck simulation, and farming simulation. The brand develops direct-drive wheel bases, steering wheels, pedals, flight controls, and related software including MOZA Pit House and MOZA Cockpit.

== History ==
MOZA originated as a brand of Shenzhen Gudsen Technology Co., Ltd., which has made handheld camera stabilizers (gimbals) under the MOZA name since around 2012, before expanding into simulation hardware.

In 2021, Gudsen entered sim racing under the MOZA Racing name, releasing the R16 and R21 direct-drive wheel bases; the R21 was positioned as a rival to Fanatec's Podium DD base. In May 2024, MOZA released the R3, an Xbox-licensed direct-drive wheel and pedal bundle. In August 2024, MOZA presented the CRP2 pedals and the mBooster active pedal at Gamescom in Cologne.

MOZA entered flight simulation at FSExpo 2024, and has since expanded its range to include force-feedback flight bases, flightsticks, yokes, throttles, panels, and rudder pedals.

In March 2026, MOZA presented the HMA150 Haptic Motion Actuator, its first motion platform, along with the MOZA Motion Manager software at the Game Developers Conference in San Francisco. On 28 July 2026, the company released the R16 Ultra wheel base and R5 Pro bundle, alongside the HMA150 motion system, the AY90 force-feedback yoke base, the MFY Pro yoke handle, the Farming Control System, and an R5 Pro truck-simulation bundle.

At the same time, MOZA was named an official partner of the Gran Turismo World Series from August 2026, and announced it was developing its first officially licensed PlayStation 5 racing products. In September 2026, MOZA showcased the R5S Pro Racing Simulator, R16S Ultra Racing Simulator, and R16S Ultra Direct Drive Wheel Base at the Tokyo Game Show. Coverage reported planned native support for Gran Turismo 7, with pricing and release timing to be announced later.

== Products ==
=== Sim racing ===
MOZA's sim-racing range includes direct-drive wheel bases, steering wheels, pedals, and shifters, configured through the MOZA Pit House software. Wheel bases range from the entry-level R5 Pro to the 21 Nm R21 Ultra and 25 Nm R25 Ultra. In 2024 the company introduced the Vision GS, a steering wheel with a built-in touchscreen dashboard.

The brand has also produced officially licensed replica steering wheels based on automotive models including the Lamborghini Essenza SCV12 and Porsche Mission R.

=== Flight simulation ===
MOZA Flight products include force-feedback flight bases such as the AB9, flightsticks, yoke systems, throttles, instrument and control panels, and rudder pedals. Flight hardware is configured through a separate application, MOZA Cockpit. In 2026, the AY90 yoke base and MFY Pro yoke handle expanded the company's force-feedback yoke range.

=== Motion and specialist simulation ===
The HMA150 Haptic Motion System uses four actuators to provide pitch, roll, and heave movement, and is designed to be fitted to an existing cockpit rig. The Farming Control System combines a joystick, throttle, and control panel for farming simulators. MOZA has also produced truck-simulation hardware, including the TSW truck steering wheel in 2024 and the R5 Pro Truck Driving Simulator bundle in 2026.

== Media coverage ==
=== Sim racing ===
PC Games Hardware reviewed the R5 Pro bundle, a 6 Nm direct-drive package priced at €419. PC Perspective also reviewed the R5 bundle in 2026.

Traxion.GG reviewed the 21 Nm R21 Ultra, priced at US$699, comparing it with the Simagic Alpha Evo Pro. French site Homeracing reviewed the 16 Nm R16 Ultra, which launched at US$529.

MOZA's licensed replica wheels have also drawn coverage from automotive and technology media, including Top Gear on the Lamborghini Essenza SCV12 wheel and Traxion.GG, TechPowerUp, and EFTM on the Porsche Mission R wheel shown at CES 2026.

=== Flight and farming simulation ===
FSElite reviewed the AB9 force-feedback base together with the MA3X sidestick, and FSNews published a review of the AB9 in 2025. MSFS Addons reviewed the AY90, a US$399 force-feedback yoke base, comparing it with MOZA's higher-end AY210.

SimRacingCockpit.gg reviewed the Farming Control System, priced at US$199.
