= Karalyn Patterson =

British neuropsychologist

Karalyn Patterson FRS FBA FMedSci
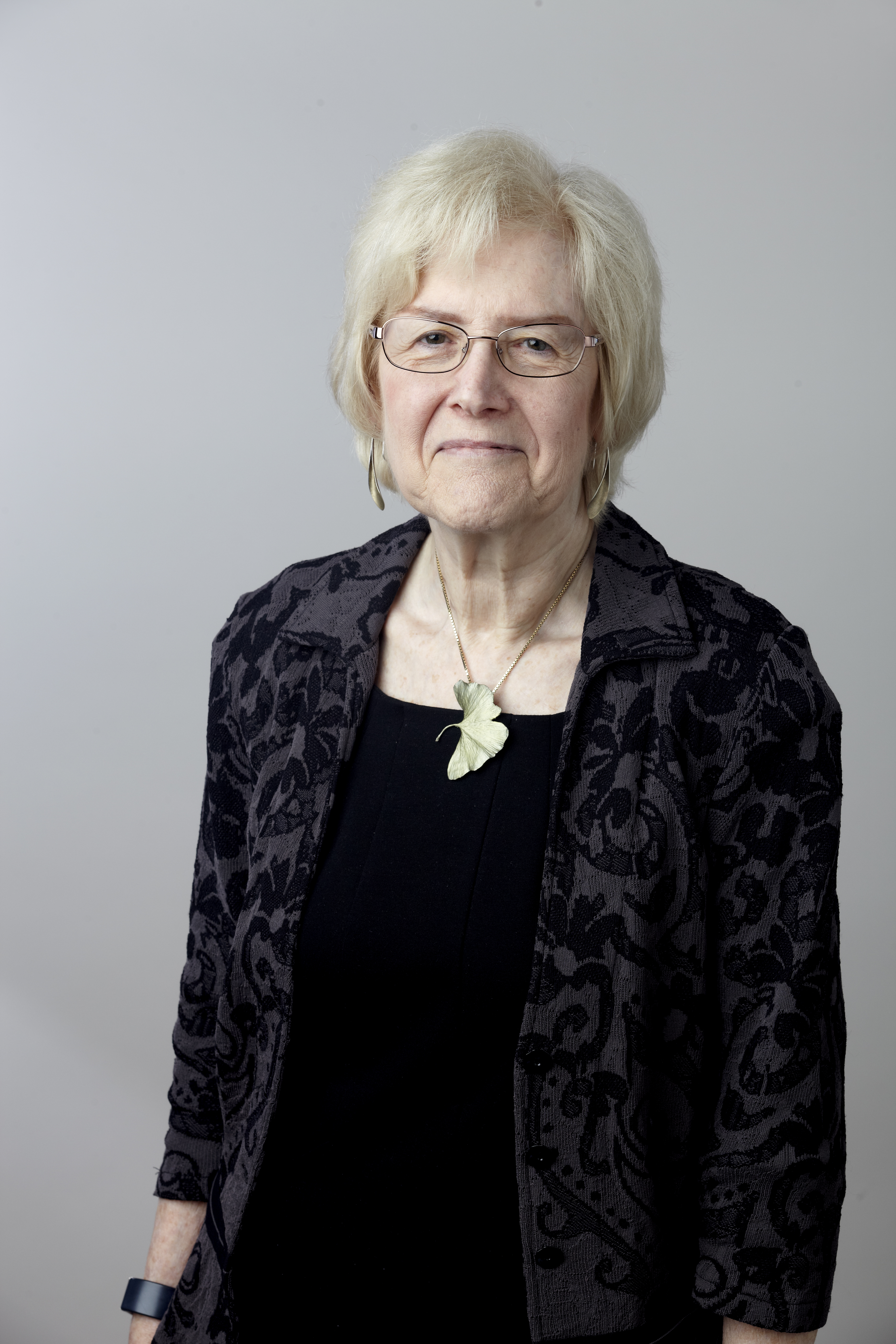
- Patterson in 2014
- Born: Chicago, Illinois, U.S.
- Education: South Shore High School
- Alma mater: University of California, San Diego
- Spouse: Roy D. Patterson
- Awards: Suffrage Science award (2020)
- Scientific career
- Fields: Cognitive neuropsychology
- Workplaces: University of Cambridge
- Thesis: Limitations on retrieval from long-term memory (1971)
- Website: neurology.cam.ac.uk/researchgrps/syren/karalyn-patterson

Karalyn Eve Patterson is a British psychologist in Department of Clinical Neurosciences, University of Cambridge and MRC Cognition and Brain Sciences Unit. She is a specialist in cognitive neuropsychology and an Emeritus Fellow of Darwin College, Cambridge.

== Early life and education ==
Patterson was born in Chicago and attended South Shore High School, Chicago, from which she graduated in 1961. She completed her Doctor of Philosophy (PhD) at the University of California, San Diego, in 1971.

== Career and research ==
In 1975, Patterson moved to England to take a position at the Applied Psychology Unit of the Medical Research Council (MRC) in Cambridge.

=== Awards and honours ===
Patterson is one of a select group of academics that are fellows of both the Royal Society, the UK's national academy for science, and the British Academy, the UK's national academy for humanities and social sciences. Her nomination for the Royal Society reads:

Karalyn Patterson was one of the prime initiators of the field of cognitive neuropsychology. The different approaches she has developed to study brain based disorders of language and memory have brought great rigour to the field, and have allowed stringent tests of different theories. She is one of the very few people in the world able to adopt a truly multi-disciplinary approach including computational modelling, behavioural observation, neuropsychological testing and functional neuroimaging. Consequently, her work has led to a better understanding of how language and memory are organised in the brain, and how they unravel in Alzheimer's disease and other types of dementia.

She was elected a Fellow of the Academy of Medical Sciences in 2003.

In 2020, Patterson was awarded the Suffrage Science Life Sciences Award.

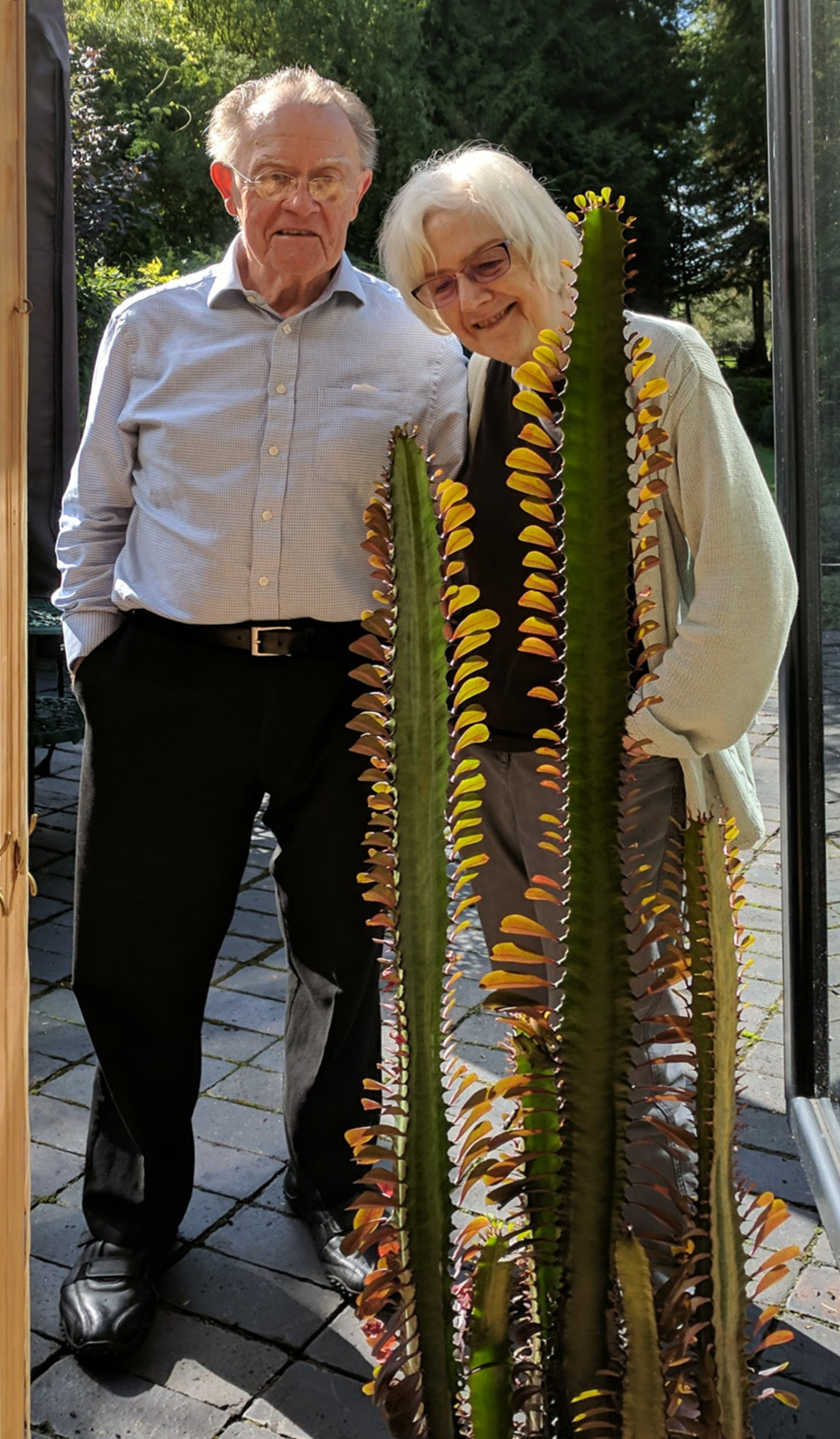
Roy and Karalyn Patterson at home in Cambridge

== Personal life ==
In addition to her academic roles, Patterson has an interest in food and wine, and has served as a wine steward at Darwin College, Cambridge. Patterson is married to Roy D. Patterson.
