= Gran Turismo Sport =

2017 sim racing video game

- Digital cover art, featuring the Mercedes-AMG GT
- Developer: Polyphony Digital
- Publisher: Sony Interactive Entertainment
- Producer: Kazunori Yamauchi
- Series: Gran Turismo
- Platform: PlayStation 4
- Release: NA: October 17, 2017; EU: October 18, 2017; JP: October 19, 2017
- Genre: Sim racing
- Modes: Single-player, multiplayer

Gran Turismo Sport is a 2017 sim racing video game developed by Polyphony Digital and published by Sony Interactive Entertainment for the PlayStation 4. It is the twelfth game in the Gran Turismo series.

One of Gran Turismo Sport's main focuses is competitive online racing, supported by the international governing body of motorsport, the Fédération Internationale de l'Automobile (FIA), and serving as the platform for the FIA-Certified Gran Turismo Championships. The game launched with 168 cars and 29 tracks; post-launch game updates have brought the count to 338 cars and 82 track configurations as of July 2021. The free updates also added a more traditional single-player campaign mode to the game. The game sold 12.977 million, making it the second highest selling game in the franchise.

Gran Turismo Sport was followed by Gran Turismo 7, which was released on March 4, 2022. The game's online services were permanently discontinued on January 31, 2024, with all DLCs delisted on the PlayStation Store on December 1, 2023.

== Gameplay ==
Gameplay screenshot depicting the player driving the Mazda MX-5 at the Nürburgring Nordschleife

Similar to its predecessors, Gran Turismo Sport is a racing game and includes two game modes: "Sport Mode" and "Arcade Mode". Online racing is also featured in the game and saving is only allowed in online mode, unlike its predecessors. The game has been described as different from the "Prologue" titles seen in the past in the series and features more content. Unlike Gran Turismo 5 and 6, the game does not feature a dynamic weather system or day-night cycle, but players still have the option to modify the race's time of day before entering the race. It includes 338 cars and 82 configurations in 32 locations to race on as of July 2021.

For the first time in the series, the game features Porsche vehicles included in the game after Electronic Arts' exclusive licensing rights to this brand had expired (previous Gran Turismo installments included Ruf cars as a substitute).

=== Sport Mode ===
Sport Mode consists of three daily races that reset every week. Each individual player is assigned a Driver Rating (DR), based on the player's overall skills, and a Sportsmanship Rating (SR), based on the player's attitude on the track, such as avoiding contact and obeying racing flags. The highest generally available levels are A+ for Driver Rating and S for Sportsmanship Rating, with the lowest being E for both, but the Driver Rating cannot exceed the Sportsmanship Rating. There is also a special S Driver Rating reserved for players ranked in the top 200 worldwide. Car performance within each category is equalized using balance of performance (BoP), which makes adjustments to the weight and power of each car to ensure a balanced gameplay.

==== FIA Gran Turismo Online Championship ====
Gran Turismo Sport also features two championships held simultaneously throughout the year: the Nations Cup, in which players represent their respective countries, and the Manufacturers Cup, in which players represent automobile marques of their choice. The FIA manages the series directly as they would with any of their other race series. The winners of the championships are honored at the FIA's annual prize-giving ceremony in Paris.

The winner of the inaugural FIA GT Sport Nations Cup in 2018 was Americas regional champion Igor Fraga (Brazil, IOF_RACING17). European regional champion Mikail Hizal (Germany, TRL_LIGHTNING) finished 2nd, while Asia-Oceania regional finalist Cody Nikola Latkovski (Australia, Nik_Makozi) ended in 3rd. The year's Manufacturers Cup was won by Lexus, represented by their top drivers Tyrell Meadows (USA, GT_Academy2013), Vincent Rigaud (France, Oscaro_SkyPikmin), and Kanata Kawakami (Japan, Kawakana222), while Toyota (Agustín Cajal (Argentina, ORMA_Aspicito), Rayan Derrouiche (France, RC_Miura) and Tomoaki Yamanaka (Japan, YamadoRacing38)) and Aston Martin (Jonathan Bucha (USA, hendrix323), Thomas Compton-Mcpherson (Great Britain, cubertom) and Yoshiharu Imai (Japan, legacy0193)) took 2nd and 3rd respectively. The live streams of the World Finals in Monaco exceeded a total of 3 million viewers across multiple channels.

=== Car categories ===
Car categories are a new gameplay concept introduced in GT Sport. Cars in the game are divided into seven categories:

- Gr. 1 - LMP and Group C race cars, including a few homologated variants of Vision Gran Turismo cars
- Gr. 2 - Silhouette racing cars, such as Super GT GT500 race cars
- Gr. 3 - GT3, GTE/GT2 and GT1 race cars, including a few homologated variants of Vision Gran Turismo cars
- Gr. 4 - GT4 race cars
- Gr. B - Group B rally cars
- N Class - Real-life road cars, spanning from the Mazda Roadster S (ND) to the Bugatti Veyron 16.4; this category is further split into 10 sub-categories based on maximum power output (rounded up or down to the closest multiple of 100, for each 50 HP; e.g. the Mercedes-AMG GT S, with maximum power of 503 HP, is in the N500 category, while the Ford F-150 SVT Raptor, with maximum power of 411 HP, is in the N400 category)
- Gr. X - Concept cars (including Vision Gran Turismo cars), as well as every other car that does not fit into any of the above categories (such as electric cars, safety cars, and track day cars)

=== PlayStation VR support ===
Gran Turismo Sport was originally announced to be fully compatible with Sony's virtual reality headset, PlayStation VR. However, VR support was later announced to be limited to a dedicated VR Tour Mode. A subsequent game update also added the ability to play the time trial game mode within VR.

== Development ==
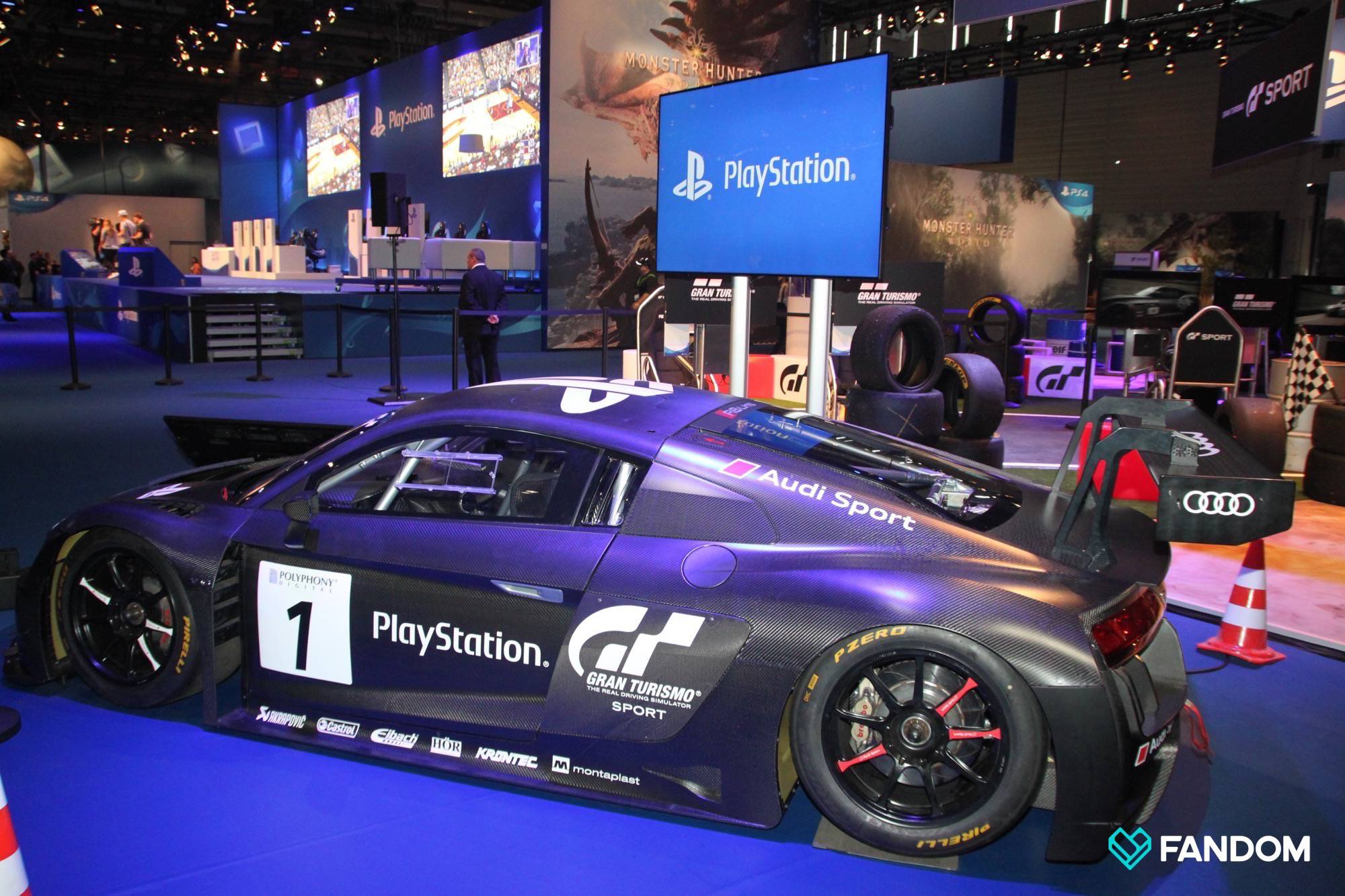
Promotion at Gamescom 2017

Series creator Kazunori Yamauchi mentioned that "Gran Turismo Sport would be coming to the PlayStation 4 console, possibly "in a year or two [from 2013]". He also mentioned that it will be based on the same physics engine that Gran Turismo 6 uses. Yamauchi also spoke of the release sometime in 2016 or 2017 and how much more powerful the game will be on PlayStation 4 and how much easier it is to develop on the console versus Gran Turismo 6 on the PlayStation 3. Gran Turismo Sport was officially announced at the 2015 Paris Games Week. Sony originally claimed that Sport is a separate entry, but Yamauchi later confirmed that it is a main entry in the series.

The developer Polyphony Digital expected Gran Turismo Sport to have much improved gameplay elements due to the enhanced processing power of the PlayStation 4. The game is the first in the Gran Turismo series to support the virtual reality headset PlayStation VR. A beta was scheduled to take place in the first and second quarter of 2016 before a full release on November 15, but Sony later cancelled the beta to prevent the game from being delayed further. Nevertheless, by August 2016, the game was delayed to 2017 to further polish the game. A closed beta was confirmed for 17 March 2017 for selected users in the United States and Europe to experience the game's features prior to its release.

Kamui Kobayashi was one of the drivers who provided technical assistance in the game. Following the expiration of Electronic Arts' exclusive licensing to Porsche, Gran Turismo Sport marked the first appearance of Porsche in a Gran Turismo title. Three-time Formula One world driver's champion Lewis Hamilton became the "maestro" of the series. Furthermore, his Time Trial Challenge DLC pack was released on November 28, 2019.

The online services of Gran Turismo Sport were permanently shut down on January 31, 2024. Prior to this, all add-on items from the PlayStation Store that can be used in the game were delisted on December 1, 2023. All offline modes remain playable, including any previously purchased DLC, with the requirement for a constant internet connection also removed. The game was delisted on the PlayStation Store on January 1, 2024.

=== Open beta and release ===
In 2017, the game was given a release date of October 17 in North America. A free demo launched on October 9. Lasting five days, the open beta allowed a limited amount of in-game progress to carry over to the full release on October 17. The demo included all three modes: arcade, campaign, and sport. PlayStation Plus members could pre-load the demo on October 7. While the game is the first in the franchise to connect to PlayStation VR, the demo did not include that feature. The demo also had the livery editor for customizing vehicles and Scapes photo mode. More than a million people played the beta. Lotus was planned to appear in the game, with the Lotus Evora (making the series' debut in Gran Turismo 5 Prologue) being playable in the closed beta, but was removed from the final game due to licensing difficulties.

As of January 2018, Polyphony Digital has implemented a traditional single-player mode (akin to previous entries in the series) in Gran Turismo Sport. Since its addition, more single-player content has been added via free updates. This is not accurately reflected in most professional reviews, which were written at the time of the game's release and do not account for any of the free content updates released in the years since.

== Reception ==
Reception

Aggregate scores
Aggregator	Score
Metacritic	75/100
OpenCritic	49% recommend

Review scores
Publication	Score
Destructoid	6/10
Electronic Gaming Monthly	6/10
Game Informer	7.75/10
GameRevolution	3/5
GameSpot	8/10
GamesRadar+	4/5
IGN	7.5/10
Hobby Consolas	84%
Metro	7/10

Gran Turismo Sport received "generally favorable" reviews, according to review aggregator website Metacritic.

Eurogamer's Martin Robinson described GT Sport as a deviation from past games in the series, by cutting the vast car collections of its predecessors and placing a sharper emphasis on competitive online driving: "There are no lunar rovers, no 19th century single horsepowered wagons and not even anything by way of an open wheel racer to be found in its car list at launch. Yet, conversely, this is possibly the most focused, directly enjoyable game Polyphony Digital has put out since the heady days of Gran Turismo 3". Robinson praised the improved sound design and addition of a livery editor that allows players to create and share their own designs online. The website later ranked the game 21st on their list of the "Top 50 Games of 2017".

IGN likewise noted that GT Sport's garage and track selection is smaller when compared to other racing games, a decision they found impossible to forgive, but described the shift to online racing as serious, sensible, and well-structured: "That PvP online environment, or Sport Mode as its dubbed, is where developer Polyphony Digital has gambled all its chips. The good news is that it has indeed created a sturdy online racing venue". Luke Reilly observed the introduction of a Sportsmanship Rating that, over time, separates poor drivers from good ones, and while less than perfect "rewards clean sectors, fair overtakes, and respectful racing".

Ray Carsillo of Electronic Gaming Monthly considered the game to be visually gorgeous and thought the cars handled well, "easily the strongest aspect of the game", but was scathing in his assessment of the always online approach to play: "If you don't play the game online, you can't save the game, and most of the games features–only single arcade races are available offline–are locked away". Carsillo awarded the game a 6/10 concluding it will disappoint anyone hoping for a more traditional Gran Turismo experience.

Jason Faulkner of Game Revolution was equally critical of the game, devoting a large portion of his review to observing the differences between GT Sport and racing games of rival color: "You'll get a lot more feeling of the weight of the cars as you drive them in this game than you do in Forza, but there's still something lacking when compared to Project Cars 2". While the cars are stunningly recreated with excellent handling, Faulkner said there simply aren't enough of them, especially when contrasted with the two aforementioned titles: "The track list is sparse as well. There are only 17 locations available in GT Sport, with variations bringing the total number of circuits up to 40". Faulkner lamented the loss of single-player content in favor of GT Sport's new online mode, which no matter how well crafted, would be unavailable when not connected to the servers.

Justin Towell of GamesRadar awarded GT Sport 4/5, citing superb tracks, solid controls and incredible handling nuance across a range of high powered vehicles. Towell said that although the game continues to offer an educational single player experience with a collection of scenarios to overcome, it's somewhat "pedestrian" and not a patch on Forza 7's career mode. Instead, the central pillar of GT Sport, and the game's main selling point, are the FIA-recognised online game modes: "Winning a slipstreaming race around an oval against real opponents is far more exciting than any offline mode. And with the real-world calendar of events taking place at set times, it all feels like it really means something". Towell noted the inconvenience that can arise when players lose internet connection but presumed the measure was "to keep an eye on cheaters".

In Game Informer's Reader's Choice Best of 2017 Awards, the game came in second place for "Best Racing Game". It was also nominated for the same category in IGN's Best of 2017 Awards.

=== Sales ===
Gran Turismo Sport topped the UK all-formats physical sales charts for one week, selling nearly three times as many copies as Forza Motorsport 7. It did the same in Japan and New Zealand, and ranked number 2 in Australia. During its first week on sale in Japan, Gran Turismo Sport sold 150,286 copies, which placed it at number one on the all format sales chart.

The game reached number one on the Japanese download sales charts, number two in Europe, and number five in the United States.

By May 2018, the game had sold around 3.3 million copies worldwide. As of December 2018, the game had around 7.5 million players worldwide. By June 2019, Gran Turismo Sport had sold an estimated eight million copies.

=== Accolades ===
Year	Award	Category	Result	Ref.
2016	Game Critics Awards	Best Racing Game	Nominated	
2016	Gamescom 2016	Best PlayStation 4 Game	Nominated	
2016	Gamescom 2016	Best Racing Game	Nominated	
2017	Game Critics Awards	Best Racing Game	Nominated	
2017	The Game Awards 2017	Best Sports/Racing Game	Nominated	
2018	Guild of Music Supervisors Awards	Best Music Supervision in a Video Game	Nominated	
2018	21st Annual D.I.C.E. Awards	Racing Game of the Year	Nominated	
2018	National Academy of Video Game Trade Reviewers Awards	Game, Franchise Racing	Nominated	
2018	National Academy of Video Game Trade Reviewers Awards	Game, Simulation	Won	
2018	National Academy of Video Game Trade Reviewers Awards	Innovation in Game Technology	Nominated	
2018	National Academy of Video Game Trade Reviewers Awards	Song Collection	Nominated	
2018	National Academy of Video Game Trade Reviewers Awards	Song, Original or Adapted ("A Country Song") (Note: Incorrectly labelled as "No Nothings")	Nominated	
2018	Italian Video Game Awards	People's Choice	Nominated	
2018	The Independent Game Developers' Association Awards	Best Audio Design	Won	
2018	The Independent Game Developers' Association Awards	Best Racing Game	Nominated	
2018	The Independent Game Developers' Association Awards	Best Social Game	Nominated	
