= Gran Turismo World Series =

Esports tournament

- Formerly: FIA-Certified Gran Turismo Championships (2018–2021)
- Game: Gran Turismo Sport (2018–2021); Gran Turismo 7 (2022–present)
- Founded: 2017; 9 years ago
- First season: 2018; 8 years ago
- Owner: Polyphony Digital
- Director: Kazunori Yamauchi
- Country: International
- Most recent champions: Nations Cup (Spain) José Serrano; Manufacturers Cup (Chile) Angel Inostroza (Japan) Shota Sato (Spain) José Serrano
- Most titles: Player: (Japan) Takuma Miyazono (5) (2 Nations, 2 Manufacturers, 1 Toyota GR GT Cup); Club: (Japan) Subaru (2) (Japan) Toyota (2)
- Sponsors: Brembo, Dunlop Tyres, Fanatec, Mazda, Moza, Toyota Gazoo Racing
- Website: Official website

The Gran Turismo World Series (GTWS) is a global sim racing esports tournament series organised by video game developer Polyphony Digital. It consists of two series that are held concurrently throughout the year; the Nations Cup (entrants from their respective countries will represent them) and the Manufacturers Cup (entrants will race for and represent their chosen manufacturer), with players earning points towards qualifying for LAN midseason tournaments known as World Tours, culminating in the annual championship event known as the World Finals. The series uses Polyphony Digital's latest game, Gran Turismo 7.

From 2018 to 2021, the Gran Turismo World Series was previously sanctioned by the Fédération Internationale de l'Automobile. Polyphony Digital's partnership with the FIA was later exclusive to the Olympic Esports Series, which lasted only one year. For some players of the tournament, the series has served as a basis of starting a career in esports before entering real-world motorsport.

== History ==
Polyphony Digital announced its partnership with governing body Fédération Internationale de l'Automobile in June 2014 to provide a more realistic racing experience in virtual motorsport. It permitted the Japanese game developer to feature content certified by the FIA and launch an online championship in Gran Turismo 6 for the following year in 2015. It would be the earliest example of an official online championship managed by Polyphony Digital and sanctioned by the FIA. The following year in 2016, Polyphony and the FIA announced the formation of the FIA-Certified Gran Turismo Championships (FIA GTC).

The series was established in Gran Turismo Sport shortly after the game's release. Many test seasons ran from 2017 to 2018, and the first official season commenced that year. The first World Tour was also held at Nürburgring, which saw Giorgio Mangano from Italy emerge as the first Nations Cup event winner, and Philippe Nicolay, Matthew Thomas, and Anthony Duval, representing BMW, become the first Manufacturer Series event winners. Brazilian racing driver Igor Fraga became the inaugural Nations Cup champion in 2018, and Kanata Kawakami, Vincent Rigaud, and Tyrell Meadows also became the inaugural Manufacturer Series champions that year. As part of the FIA's involvement as a sanctioning body, the champions were also honoured at the FIA Prize Giving Ceremony.

In 2019, Polyphony Digital and Toyota Gazoo Racing introduced the Toyota GR Supra GT Cup. Originally a one-make series exclusive to the Toyota GR Supra, the series was later expanded in 2021 to include the rest of Toyota's lineup available in the game. The series was later renamed the Toyota Gazoo Racing GT Cup. The series officially concluded in April 2025, with a post on X by Toyota confirming its discontinuation.

The format for the series changed in 2021 in the wake of the COVID-19 pandemic. All previously planned live events were dropped, and the season would instead be held online. Italian player Valerio Gallo won the 2021 World Finals and became the final Gran Turismo Sport champion.

The series transferred over to Gran Turismo 7 for the 2022 season. Polyphony's partnership with the FIA was also put on hiatus that year, with FIA's Director of Innovative Sporting Projects, Frederic Bertrand, stating that they would resume the collaboration once Gran Turismo 7 becomes a sufficiently stable platform. As a result, the FIA name was dropped, and the tournament was renamed to the Gran Turismo World Series (GTWS). Two live events were reintroduced as part of the 2022 season, with the series returning to Hangar-7 in Salzburg, Austria for the Showdown and Monte-Carlo Sporting in Monte Carlo, Monaco for the World Finals. The first season held in Gran Turismo 7 concluded in controversy in the World Finals for both disciplines, as the representatives for Mazda experienced equipment issues and were forced to retire from the Manufacturers Cup, and eventual Nations Cup champion Coque López would win his first title following contact with fellow contender Angel Inostroza in a collision that was deemed a racing incident.

Competitors of the series have seen opportunities in real-world motorsport through their participation in the tournament. Five-time champion Takuma Miyazono raced in the first round of the 2025 Nürburgring Langstrecken-Serie and the 2026 24 Hours of Nürburgring, racing in the VT2 production car class with Toyo Tires and Ring Racing. Racing drivers have also taken part, including Super Formula and Super GT drivers Igor Fraga and Rikuto Kobayashi, the former of which has won four championships in the series.

As of 2026, Brembo, Dunlop Tyres, Fanatec, Mazda, Moza, and Toyota Gazoo Racing serve as the series partners of the World Series. The series is provided with clothing by Puma and peripherals by Fanatec.

=== Exhibition events ===
In addition to the professional events, the tournament has hosted exhibition races since 2019. One of these exhibition races is known as 'Pro-Am', where competitors of the series would pair with various personalities, spanning from content creators to professional racing drivers, including Formula One drivers such as Juan Pablo Montoya and game ambassadors Esteban Ocon and Lewis Hamilton. Exhibition races have also been hosted by Sony's artificial intelligence department, Sony AI, where select series drivers race against their agent known as 'Gran Turismo Sophy', developed in collaboration by Sony AI, Sony Interactive Entertainment, and Polyphony Digital. This race is also used as a testing ground for Sony's AI team to evaluate Sophy's pace and behaviour on the race track.

== Format ==
=== 2018 season ===
Before the "Online Series" is started, every season begins with a "World Tour" event, containing the top drivers from the season prior. The winner from the World Tour event gains direct access to the "World Final" event.

A phase dubbed as the "Online Series", which is essentially a qualification phase to decide the participants that will race in the live events of the championship tournament, kicks off every season. The Online Series is divided into four stages, with each stage hosting ten rounds. By the end of each stage, another World Tour event is hosted, which includes the top players from that stage instead of the top drivers from the previous season. The top players who are selected after the series must sign an application form in order to be able to participate for the World Tour events, and they must also be over 18. The Online Series goes on for five to seven months.

The "Live Events" begin after the Online Series. The Nations Cup category includes the top 90 players (30 per region) with the highest points across all four stages. Three different live events occur, with each live event carrying a specific world region. The top 10 players from those regions enter the "World Final" event, a championship stage to decide the number one player. The Manufacturer Series category includes the top 48 players (three players per region) and 16 manufacturers with the highest points across all four stages. The top players and manufacturers participate in the "World Final" event, to decide the top three players and the number one manufacturer. The winners of their respective series at the "World Final" are crowned either Nations Cup champion or Manufacturer Series champion.

=== 2020 season ===
==== Format changes during COVID-19 pandemic ====
Due to the COVID-19 pandemic, it was announced that the 2020 World Finals would be held as an online-based event.

Further format changes were made for 2021, where the online season (named World Series) was divided into six online races (replacing the physical World Tours), four of them containing one race for Nations Cup and Manufacturer Series, plus the mid-season "Showdown" playoff races and the grand finals, which were aired as tape delayed streams. The first two World Series races featured top competitors from the previous season (16 Nations Cup drivers and 12 Manufacturer Series players that chose the same manufacturer as with the previous season, with limit of one player per brand), after which they would race together against top players from the first half of the online qualifiers (the in-game races accessible to the general public) in the Showdown to determine who would advance to the next two stages. Players that advanced to the third and fourth round would then face opponents that qualified in the second half of the online qualifiers through the same criteria in the grand finals.

=== 2023 season ===
The Nations Cup format saw a switch from a single-driver series to a team-based event, a format previously used by Polyphony Digital in 2018 at the Hangar-7 World Tour.

The online season was divided into fourteen online races (seven rounds per series), in which top players would race against each other to determine who would qualify for both the Showdown event in August and for the World Tour grand finals in December. For the new team-based Nations Cup format, entries were decided based on the highest finishing players affiliated with their country in the points standings. The top three competitors of each country would form the lineup for their respective team.

Events with live audiences also returned in 2023 for the first time since the 2020 Sydney World Tour event, with the Showdown round in Theater Amsterdam at Amsterdam, the Netherlands.

Players can participate in the Online Series from within the Sport mode of Gran Turismo 7. Players that register are separated in three leagues based on in-game driver rating; 'GT1 League' with a driver rating of A and higher, 'GT2 League' with a driver rating of B, and 'GT3 League' with a driver rating of C and lower. However, only those in the GT1 League are eligible for participation in the World Series and World Finals live events.

== Awards ==
The Nations Cup and Manufacturers Cup trophies are laser-scanned reproductions of Italian sculptor Umberto Boccioni's 1913 bronze futurist sculpture Unique Forms of Continuity in Space, chosen by Polyphony Digital as it represents the “surprise and fascination of machines first discovered by mankind”, and also shares values held by the Gran Turismo series. Players are given a plaque for their participation in the series during live events and by the end of the year. Players who finish in the Top 3 in any series receive a gold plaque and a trophy. Players were also formerly given a TAG Heuer watch, but no longer became a prize after their partnership with Polyphony ended in 2020; a set of Sony Alpha photography equipment were given out that year, followed by a set of BBS wheels for 2021.

== Eligible countries and car manufacturers ==
=== Nations Cup ===
As of 2025, 66 countries across five regions; EMEA, North America, Central and South America, Asia, and Oceania, are eligible to participate in the Nations Cup series.

Participating countries
Europe, Middle East & Africa			North America	Central & South America	Asia	Oceania
Austria; Bahrain; Belgium; Bulgaria; Croatia (Czech Republic) Czechia; Denmark; Finland; France; Germany (United Kingdom) Great Britain; Greece; Hungary	Iceland; India (Republic of Ireland) Ireland; Israel; Italy; Kuwait; Lebanon; Luxembourg; Netherlands; Norway; Oman; Poland; Portugal	Qatar; Romania; Saudi Arabia; Slovakia; Slovenia; South Africa; Spain; Sweden; Switzerland; Turkey; Ukraine; United Arab Emirates	Canada; United States	Argentina; Brazil; Chile; Colombia; Costa Rica; Ecuador; El Salvador; Guatemala; Honduras; Mexico; Nicaragua; Panama; Paraguay; Peru; Uruguay	China; Hong Kong; Indonesia; Japan (South Korea) Korea; Malaysia; Singapore; Taiwan; Thailand	Australia; New Zealand

=== Manufacturers Cup ===
Players have the option to choose between 27 different manufacturers for the qualification stage of the tournament. In the current format, the 12 highest-scoring manufacturers move on to the World Tours.

- (Italy) Alfa Romeo
- (United Kingdom) Aston Martin
- (Germany) Audi
- (Germany) BMW
- (United States) Chevrolet
- (France) Citroën
- (United States) Dodge
- (Italy) Ferrari
- (United States) Ford
- (South Korea) Genesis
- (Japan) Honda
- (South Korea) Hyundai
- (United Kingdom) Jaguar
- (Italy) Lamborghini
- (Japan) Lexus
- (Japan) Mazda
- (Germany) Mercedes-AMG
- (United Kingdom) McLaren
- (Japan) Mitsubishi
- (Japan) Nissan
- (France) Peugeot
- (Germany) Porsche
- (France) Renault
- (Japan) Subaru
- (Japan) Suzuki
- (Japan) Toyota
- (Germany) Volkswagen

== In other media ==
World Series drivers including previous champions Igor Fraga, Mikail Hizal, Takuma Miyazono, Tomoaki Yamanaka, Valerio Gallo, Coque López, and Daniel Solis appear in Gran Turismo 7 as AI opponents and License Test coaches.

== Media coverage ==
The World Series races are usually streamed live from Dock10 studios on YouTube and Twitch under the official Gran Turismo and PlayStation channels, and are available to watch through several languages.

Presenter	Language
Jimmy Broadbent	English
Tom Brooks	English
Julia Hardy	English
Michel Wolk	German
Florian Strauss	German
Donald Reignoux	French
Fabian Tarakci	French
Jordan Tresson	French
Andrea Facchinetti	Italian
Emilio Cozzi	Italian
Alberto Perez	Spanish
Lucas Ordóñez	Spanish
Duarte Félix da Costa	Portuguese
Gonçalo Comes	Portuguese
Hideyuki Nakajima	Japanese
YAM	Japanese
RacingRaymond	Chinese

== Champions ==
There have been eight different individual Nations Cup champions and eighteen different individual Manufacturers Cup champions as of 2025, in addition to five different Manufacturers Cup winning manufacturers. At the time of its conclusion, five different Toyota GR GT Cup champions were awarded. Takuma Miyazono is currently the most successful driver in the Gran Turismo World Series, with a total of five individual championship titles to his name: one Toyota GR GT Cup title, two Nations Cup titles and two Manufacturers Cup titles.

Coque López, Takuma Miyazono, and José Serrano currently hold the most Nations Cup titles with two each, the former of which also became the first repeat Nations Cup champion after winning his second title in 2023, the only time the Nations Cup was run on a team-based format so far, alongside José Serrano and Pol Urra. As for the Manufacturers Cup, six drivers – Igor Fraga, Tomoaki Yamanaka, Takuma Miyazono, Daniel Solis, Coque López and Kanata Kawakami – currently hold the most individual titles with two each; Fraga and Yamanaka for Toyota, Miyazono and Solis for Subaru, and Kawakami and López for Lexus. Miyazono is the only driver to have completed a treble in a single year when the Toyota GR GT Cup was active, winning all three series championships in 2020.

From 2018 until 2024, all Manufacturers Cup winners were all Japanese manufacturers (Lexus, Toyota, Subaru and Nissan), with Porsche being the first non-Japanese manufacturer to win the title in 2025.

Igor Fraga, Mikail Hizal, Takuma Miyazono, Coque López, and José Serrano all hold the distinction for having won both the Nations Cup and Manufacturers Cup championships in the Gran Turismo World Series.

Season	Nations Cup	Manufacturers Cup		Toyota GR GT Cup
2018	(Brazil) Igor Fraga	(Japan) Kanata Kawakami (United States) Tyrell Meadows (France) Vincent Rigaud	(Japan) Lexus	Not held
2019	(Germany) Mikail Hizal	(France) Rayan Derrouiche (Brazil) Igor Fraga (Japan) Tomoaki Yamanaka	(Japan) Toyota	(Germany) Mikail Hizal
2020	(Japan) Takuma Miyazono	(Germany) Mikail Hizal (Japan) Takuma Miyazono (United States) Daniel Solis	(Japan) Subaru	(Japan) Takuma Miyazono
2021	(Italy) Valerio Gallo	(Brazil) Igor Fraga (Spain) Coque López (Japan) Tomoaki Yamanaka	(Japan) Toyota	(Japan) Tomoaki Yamanaka
2022	(Spain) Coque López	(France) Kylian Drumont (Japan) Takuma Miyazono (United States) Daniel Solis	(Japan) Subaru	(Brazil) Igor Fraga
2023	(Spain) Pol Urra (Spain) Coque López (Spain) José Serrano	(France) Mehdi Hafidi (Japan) Ryota Kokubun (Argentina) Mateo Estevez	(Japan) Nissan	(Spain) Pol Urra
2024	(Japan) Takuma Miyazono	(Japan) Kanata Kawakami (Spain) Coque López (Chile) Harald Walsen	(Japan) Lexus	(Spain) José Serrano
2025	(Spain) José Serrano	(Chile) Angel Inostroza (Japan) Shota Sato (Spain) José Serrano	(Germany) Porsche	Not held

== Results ==
Season	Event	Location	Date	Nations Cup	Manufacturers Cup	Ref.
In Gran Turismo Sport
2018	World Tour 2018 - Nürburgring	Nürburg, Germany	10-13 May	(Italy) Italy; Giorgio Mangano	BMW (France) Anthony Duval (Luxembourg) Philippe Nicolay (United Kingdom) Matthew Thomas	
2018	World Tour 2018 - Red Bull Hangar-7	Salzburg, Austria	22 September	(Hungary) Hungary; Patrik Blazsán; Ádám Tápai; Benjámin Báder	Nissan (Germany) Mikail Hizal (United States) Andrew McCabe	
2018	Nations Cup Asia/Oceania Final 2018	Odaiba, Japan	6-7 October	(Japan) Japan; Ryota Kokubun	Not held	
2018	Nations Cup European Final 2018	Madrid, Spain	19-20 October	(Germany) Germany; Mikail Hizal	Not held	
2018	Nations Cup Americas Final 2018	Las Vegas, Nevada, USA	31 October	(Brazil) Brazil; Igor Fraga	Not held	
2018	World Finals 2018	Monte Carlo, Monaco	16-18 November	(Brazil) Brazil; Igor Fraga	Lexus (Japan) Kanata Kawakami (United States) Tyrell Meadows (France) Vincent Rigaud	
2019	World Tour 2019 - Paris	Paris, France	16-17 March	(Chile) Chile; Nicolas Rubilar	Aston Martin (United Kingdom) Thomas Compton-McPherson (Japan) Yoshiharu Imai (United States) Christopher Marcell	
2019	World Tour 2019 - Nürburgring	Nürburg, Germany	21-22 June	(Brazil) Brazil; Igor Fraga	Toyota (New Zealand) Simon Bishop (Netherlands) Rick Kevelham (Japan) Tomoaki Yamanaka	
2019	World Tour 2019 - New York	New York City, New York, USA	24-25 August	(Brazil) Brazil; Igor Fraga	Mercedes-AMG (United States) Anthony Felix (Australia) Cody Nikola Latkovski (Costa Rica) Bernal Valverde	
2019	World Tour 2019 - Red Bull Hangar-7	Salzburg, Austria	13-14 September	(Germany) Germany; Mikail Hizal	Mercedes-AMG (United States) Anthony Felix (France) Tom Lartilleux (Australia) Cody Nikola Latkovski	
2019	World Tour 2019 - Tokyo	Tokyo, Japan	26-27 October	(Japan) Japan; Ryota Kokubun	Porsche (United States) Tristan Bayless (Chile) Angel Inostroza (Australia) Matt Simmons	
2019	World Finals 2019	Monte Carlo, Monaco	22-24 November	(Germany) Germany; Mikail Hizal	Toyota (France) Rayan Derrouiche (Brazil) Igor Fraga (Japan) Tomoaki Yamanaka	
2020	World Tour 2020 - Sydney	Sydney, Australia	15-16 February	(Japan) Japan; Takuma Miyazono	BMW (United States) Randall Haywood (Spain) Coque López (Chile) Nicolás Rubilar	
2020	World Tour 2020 - Nürburgring	Nürburg, Germany	22-23 May	Cancelled due to the COVID-19 pandemic and the postponement of 2020 24 Hours of Nürburgring		
2020	Nations Cup EMEA Regional Final 2020	Online	22 November	(Spain) Spain; Coque López	Not held	
2020	Nations Cup Americas Regional Final 2020	Online	29 November	(Brazil) Brazil; Adriano Carrazza	Not held	
2020	Nations Cup Asia-Oceania Regional Final 2020	Online	6 December	(Japan) Japan; Takuma Miyazono	Not held	
2020	World Finals 2020	Online	19-20 December	(Japan) Japan; Takuma Miyazono	Subaru (Germany) Mikail Hizal (Japan) Takuma Miyazono (United States) Daniel Solis	
2021	World Series 2021 Round 1	Online	6 June	(Italy) Italy; Valerio Gallo	Porsche (Chile) Angel Inostroza	
2021	World Series 2021 Round 2	Online	11 July	(Hungary) Hungary; Patrik Blazsán	Subaru (Japan) Takuma Miyazono	
2021	World Series 2021 Showdown	Online	21-22 August	(Japan) Japan; Ryota Kokubun	Toyota (Brazil) Igor Fraga (Spain) Coque López (Japan) Tomoaki Yamanaka	
2021	World Series 2021 Round 3	Online	3 October	(Italy) Italy; Valerio Gallo	Porsche (Spain) José Serrano	
2021	World Series 2021 Round 4	Online	14 November	(Italy) Italy; Valerio Gallo	Toyota (Brazil) Igor Fraga	
2021	World Finals 2021	Online	3-5 December	(Italy) Italy; Valerio Gallo	Toyota (Brazil) Igor Fraga (Spain) Coque López (Japan) Tomoaki Yamanaka	
In Gran Turismo 7
2022	World Series 2022 Round 1	Online	23-24 July	(Brazil) Brazil; Lucas Bonelli	Subaru (Japan) Takuma Miyazono	
2022	World Series 2022 Showdown	Salzburg, Austria	30-31 July	(France) France; Kylian Drumont	Subaru (France) Kylian Drumont (Japan) Takuma Miyazono (Note: Takuma Miyazono tested positive for COVID-19 a day prior to the start of the World Series 2022 Showdown and was forbidden to participate.) (United States) Daniel Solis	
2022	World Series 2022 Round 2	Online	25 September; 9 October	(Chile) Chile; Angel Inostroza	Toyota (Brazil) Igor Fraga	
2022	World Series 2022 Round 3	Online	6 November; 13 November	(Spain) Spain; José Serrano	Toyota (Japan) Ryota Kokubun	
2022	World Finals 2022	Monte Carlo, Monaco	25-27 November	(Spain) Spain; Coque López (Note: Coque López was tied in points with Angel Inostroza by the conclusion of the event, but since he won the Grand Final in Monaco, he had the tiebreaker advantage in the standings for the championship.)	Subaru (Note: Subaru was tied in points with Toyota by the conclusion of the event, but since they won the Grand Final in Monaco, they had the tiebreaker advantage in the standings for the championship.) (France) Kylian Drumont (Japan) Takuma Miyazono (United States) Daniel Solis	
2023	World Series 2023 Showdown	Amsterdam, Netherlands	11-12 August	(Spain) Spain; Pol Urra; Coque López; José Serrano	Porsche (Chile) Angel Inostroza (Note: Angel Inostroza suffered a leg injury prior to the start of the World Series 2023 Showdown and subsequently withdrew from the event.) (Japan) Takuma Sasaki (Spain) José Serrano	
2023	World Finals 2023	Barcelona, Spain	1-3 December	(Spain) Spain; Pol Urra; Coque López; José Serrano	Nissan (Argentina) Mateo Estevez (France) Mehdi Hafidi (Japan) Ryota Kokubun	
2024	World Series 2024 Round 1	Montreal, Quebec, Canada	6 July	(Japan) Japan; Takuma Miyazono	Lexus (Brazil) Igor Fraga	
2024	World Series 2024 Round 2	Prague, Czechia	10 August	(Italy) Italy; Valerio Gallo	Ferrari (United Kingdom) Mohamed Buhdeima	
2024	World Series 2024 Round 3	Shinjuku (Tokyo), Japan	28 September	(France) France; Kylian Drumont	Lexus (Japan) Kanata Kawakami	
2024	World Finals 2024	Amsterdam, Netherlands	6-8 December	(Japan) Japan; Takuma Miyazono	BMW (Note: Despite winning the Grand Final race in Amsterdam, BMW were behind Lexus in the final Manufacturers Cup standings by one point, therefore the championship title went to Lexus.) (France) Thomas Labouteley (United States) Calen Roach (Japan) Seiya Suzuki	
2025	World Series 2025 Round 1	London, England, Great Britain	7 June	(Spain) Spain; José Serrano	Subaru (Japan) Takuma Miyazono	
2025	World Series 2025 Round 2	Berlin, Germany	20 September	(Spain) Spain; José Serrano	Subaru (France) Kylian Drumont	
2025	World Series 2025 Round 3	Los Angeles, California, USA	8 November	(Spain) Spain; Pol Urra	Porsche (Chile) Angel Inostroza	
2025	World Finals 2025	Fukuoka, Japan	20-21 December	(Spain) Spain; José Serrano	Porsche (Chile) Angel Inostroza (Japan) Shota Sato (Spain) José Serrano	
2026	World Series 2026 Round 1	Milan, Italy (Note: Round 1 was originally set to take place in Abu Dhabi, United Arab Emirates on 28 March, but was postponed following security concerns related to the events of the 2026 Iran war. Milan, Italy, the original host for Round 2, was later given the season opening slot.)	23 May	(Spain) Spain; Pol Urra	Porsche (Spain) José Serrano	
2026	World Series 2026 Round 2	Tokyo, Japan (Note: Following Round 1's relocation to Milan, Italy, Round 2 was instead set to take place at Polyphony Digital's headquarters as a prerecorded event.)	15 August	(France) France; Kylian Drumont	Porsche (Japan) Takuma Sasaki	
2026	World Series 2026 Round 3	Marina Bay, Singapore	3 October	(Japan) Japan; Takuma Miyazono	Subaru (United States) Daniel Solis	
2026	World Finals 2026	Shibuya (Tokyo), Japan	5-6 December			

== See also ==
- Honda Racing eMS
