= Ray Meddis =

British auditory psychologist

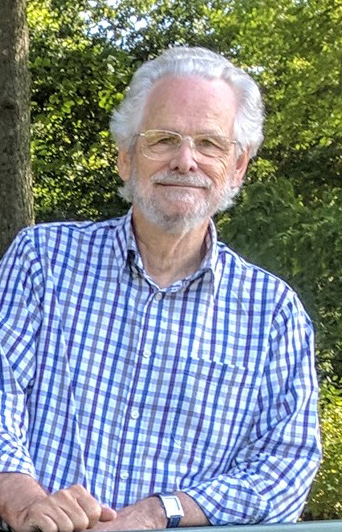
- Ray Meddis in 2017
- Born: Raymond Meddis; July 23, 1944
- Died: November 25, 2018 (aged 74)
- Scientific career
- Fields: Psychology
- Workplaces: University of Essex
- Notable students: André van Schaik

Raymond Meddis (23 July 1944 – 25 November 2018) was a British auditory psychologist. He was a professor of psychology at University of Essex since 1996, emeritus since 2011.

Since 1997, Meddis was one of the principals of the multi-site Center for the Neural Basis of Hearing, along with co-chairs Roy D. Patterson and Ian Winter of Cambridge University and others.

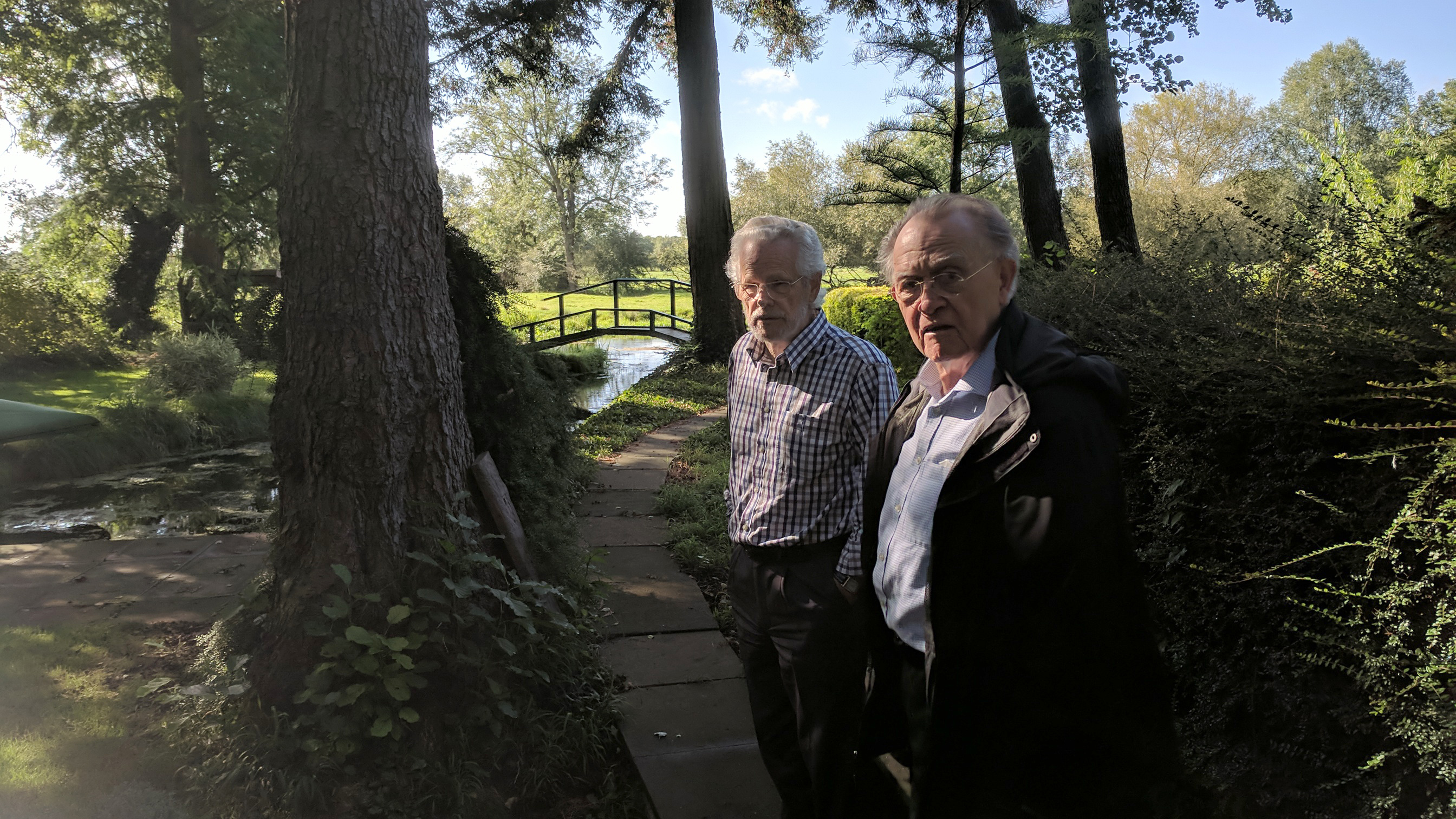
Meddis with Roy D. Patterson, in Patterson's garden in Cambridge
