= Roy D. Patterson =

British physiologist

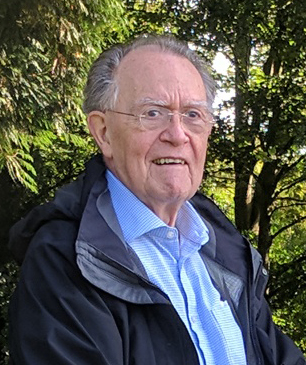
- Born: Boston, MA, USA
- Education: PhD, University of California at San Diego (USCD), 1971
- Spouse: Karalyn Patterson
- Scientific career
- Fields: Auditory sciences
- Institutions: Applied Psychology Unit and University of Cambridge, Cambridge, UK
- Thesis: "Physical variables determining residue pitch" (1971)
- Doctoral advisor: David M. Green
- Website: www.pdn.cam.ac.uk/directory/roy-patterson

Roy Dunbar Patterson is an auditory neuroscientist in the Department of Physiology, Development, and Neuroscience at the University of Cambridge. He is a senior research scientist of the UK Medical Research Council and a Fellow of the Acoustical Society of America, from which he received the Silver Medal in Psychological and Physiological Acoustics in 2015.

== Biography ==
Patterson grew up in Toronto and studied Chemical Engineering and Experimental Psychology at the University of Toronto, graduating in 1967. He did his PhD at the University of California, San Diego, in David M. Green's lab. The purpose was to develop a computational version of J. C. R. Licklider's (1951) "duplex theory of pitch perception". This involved first developing an "auditory filter bank" model of the spectral analysis performed by the human peripheral auditory system, and then running experiments on residue pitch perception, to determine how "triggered temporal integration" could transform the neural activity flowing from the auditory filter bank into the temporal dimension of Licklider's duplex model.

Patterson received his PhD in 1971, and returned to Toronto where he was employed by the Defence and Civil Institute of Environmental Medicine. He used the auditory models developed during his doctoral studies to improve auditory warnings in various Canadian aircraft. He moved in 1975 to the Applied Psychology Unit of the Medical Research Council in Cambridge, UK. Among his various pursuits, Patterson continued his work on auditory warnings, including the preparation of guidelines for auditory warning systems on civil aircraft during a stay at the Institute for Perception Research, Eindhoven, The Netherlands. This work found applications by the Royal Air Force, the Civil Aviation Authority, British Rail, the London Fire Brigade and the International Organization for Standardization (ISO) committee on hospital warnings.

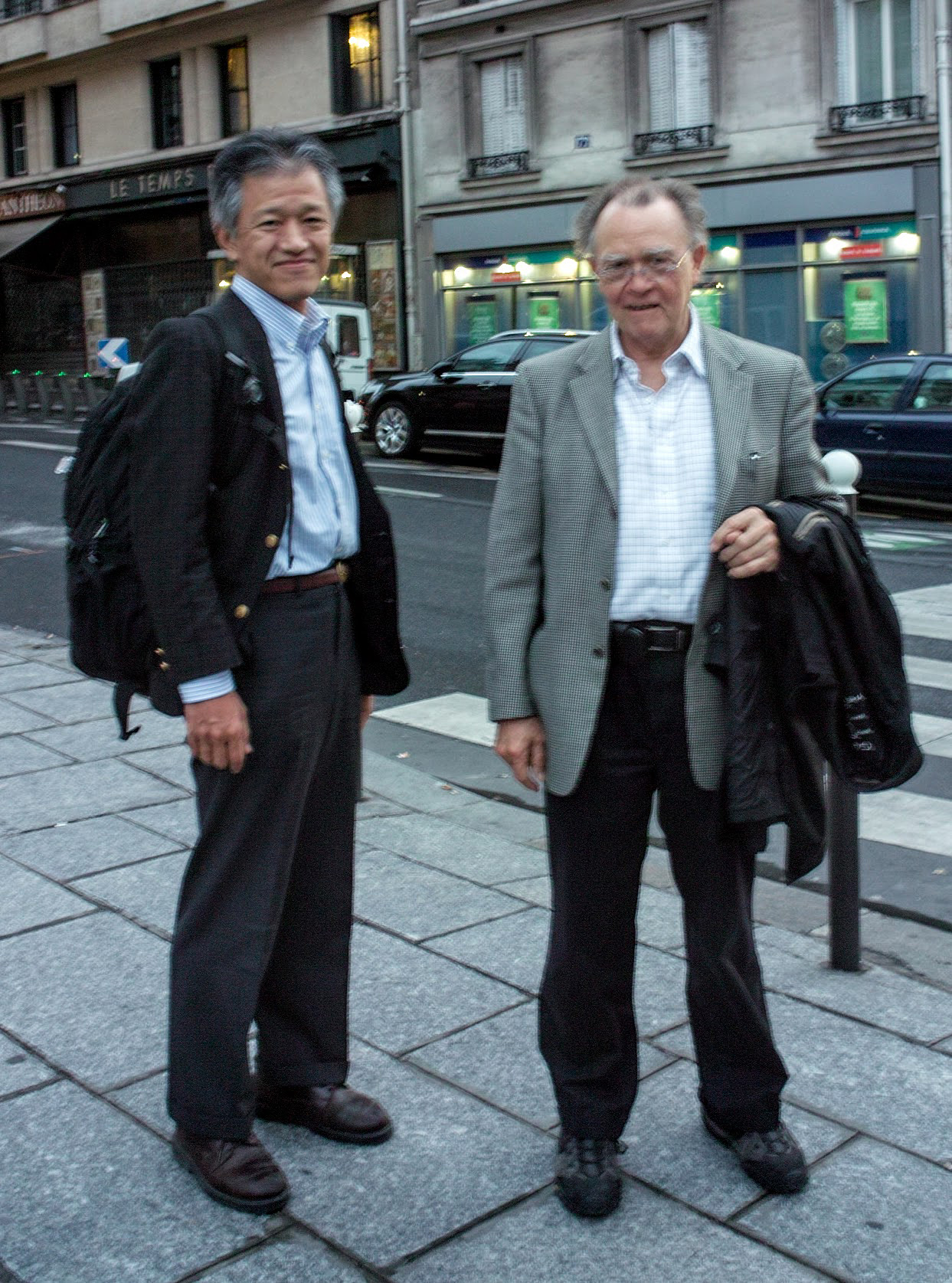
Patterson with Toshio Irino, in Paris for a 2010 workshop on auditory features

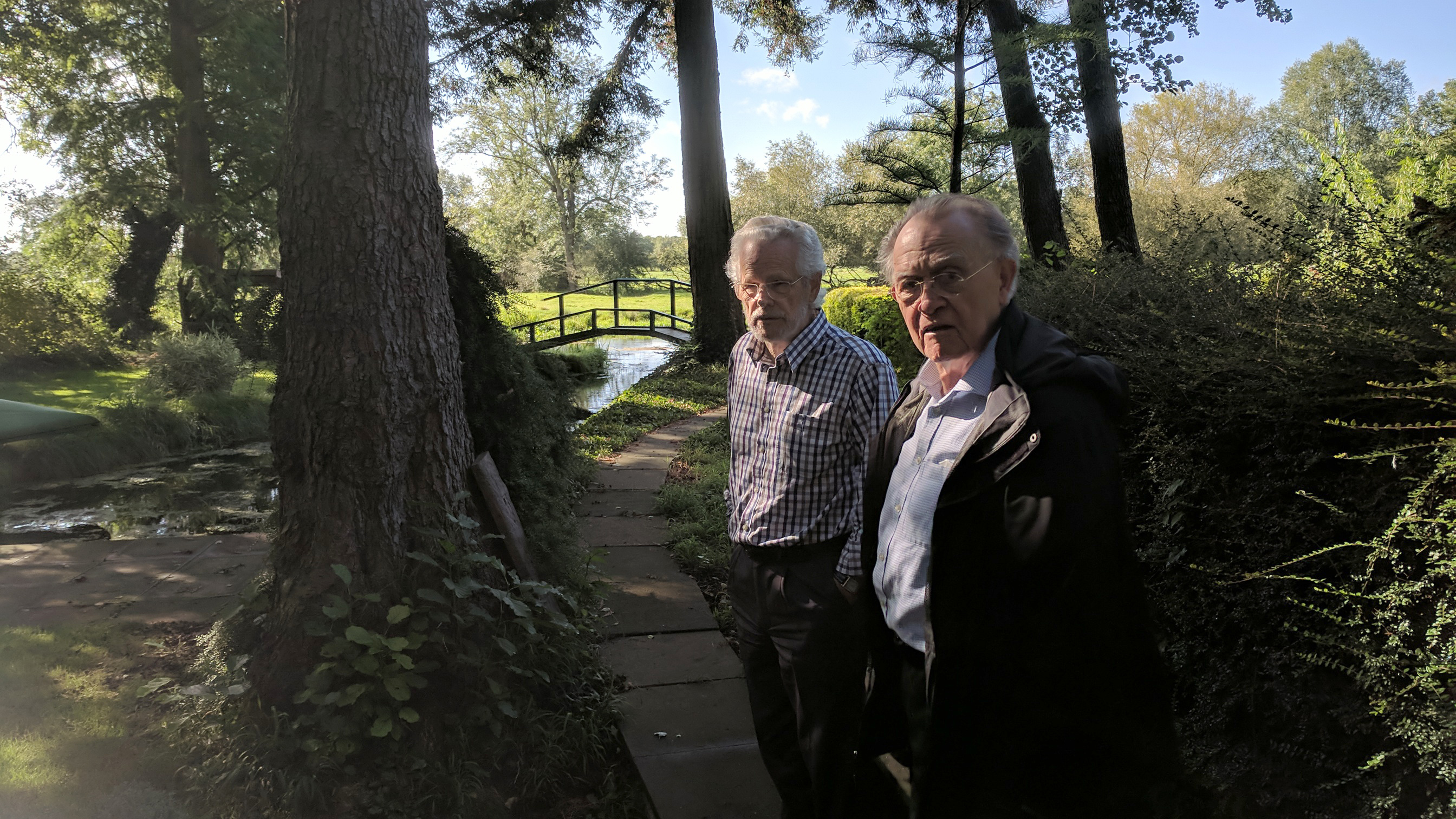
Patterson in his garden with University of Essex hearing researcher Professor Ray Meddis

In 1990, Patterson, returning to his work on auditory modelling, developed a new dynamic model creating a visual representation of the neural activity resulting from an auditory stimulus: the Auditory Image Model (AIM).

Patterson moved in 1997 from the APU, then rebranded CBSU, to the Department of Physiology, Development and Neuroscience of the University of Cambridge, where he and Ian Winter founded the Centre for the Neural Basis of Hearing (CNBH). The CNBH was a multi-university lab, with a second centre at the University of Essex directed by Ray Meddis. From 2013 to 2015, Patterson worked at the University of Plymouth as Professor of Psychology. Patterson remained the head of the CNBH until 2015.

At the CNBH, Patterson, together with Toshio Irino, developed an optimal "gammachirp" filter that could explain why auditory perception is so robust to variation in source size. Patterson and Irino then build a version of the auditory image that is "scale-shift invariant", i.e. where sounds produced by sources of different sizes (e.g. syllables uttered by adults and children) have the same representation, except for a translation.

== Personal life ==
Patterson and his wife Karalyn Patterson are "foodies" who combine good food and wine with scientific conversation at their dinners. Roy is also an avid gardener, specializing in exotic conifers such as giant sequoia and other redwoods.
