= Drop (company) =

Community-driven commerce platform

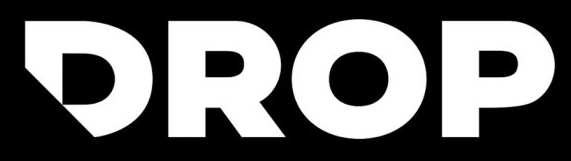
- Formerly: Massdrop
- Type: Subsidiary
- Industry: Consumer electronics
- Founded: 2012; 14 years ago in San Francisco, California, U.S.
- Founders: Steve El-Hage (CEO); Nelson Wu; Will Bright
- Headquarters: Milpitas, California, United States
- Area served: Worldwide
- Number of employees: 100+
- Parent: Corsair (2023–present)
- Website: drop.com

Drop (formerly Massdrop) was an American e-commerce company based in San Francisco, California. In July 2023, Corsair purchased Drop, while retaining its original brand and staff.

== History ==
Drop founders Steve El-Hage and Nelson Wu met in Toronto, Canada, where El-Hage was studying economics at the University of Toronto. The two had grown up using online forums as a way of exploring their hobbies, but believed these forums had many shortcomings, including disorganized meetups and unreliable group buys. They thought that by combining their forum experiences with their interest in bulk buying, they could create a site that would better support their enthusiast in communities. The pair moved to Silicon Valley, where they met Will Bright and started Massdrop in 2012.

Drop changed its name from Massdrop in April 2019.

On July 17, 2023, Corsair announced it had acquired Drop.

On February 25, 2026, Drop announced that its brand and online store would be shutting down on March 31st, with final orders placed on March 25th.

== Business model ==
Initially, Drop sold products exclusively from existing manufacturers. Drop would organize and facilitate group buys for their community members. They allowed community members to influence the products chosen to be sold through forums and polls. Drop originally worked with various communities, but have since primarily sold products relating to the mechanical keyboard and audiophile communities.

The company has since introduced their own exclusive products, collaborations, and private-label products under the names Drop and Drop Studio.

=== Past Drop products ===
Past products include the Massdrop x Sennheiser HD 6XX headphones, Massdrop x Sennheiser HD 58X headphones, Massdrop CTRL Mechanical Keyboard, Massdrop x Sennheiser PC37X gaming headset, Massdrop x Koss ESP/95X, among others.

== Funding ==
In September 2014, Drop raised $6.5 million in a Series A round led by Mayfield Fund with additional investment from previous backers Kleiner Perkins Caufield & Byers, First Round Capital, and Cowboy Ventures. In August 2015, the company secured $40 million in Series B funding led by August Capital with additional investment from Mayfield Fund, First Round Capital, and Cowboy Ventures.
