= Elgato =

Consumer electronics brand

Corsair GmbH
- Product type: Consumer electronics, peripherals, software
- Current owner: Corsair Gaming, Inc.
- Introduced: 2010; 16 years ago
- Markets: Live streaming, podcasting
- Previous owners: Elgato Systems
- Website: elgato.com

Elgato (Corsair GmbH) is a brand of consumer technology products. The brand was manufactured and designed by Elgato Systems, founded in 2010 by Markus Fest and Stuart Smith, it was headquartered in Munich, Germany, until 2018 when the brand was sold to Corsair.

== History ==
The brand, Elgato, was formerly a brand of Elgato Systems. The Elgato brand was used to refer to the company gaming and thunderbolt devices and was commonly called Elgato Gaming. The name of the company comes from the Spanish word for cat.

On June 28, 2018, Corsair acquired the Elgato brand, which is now called Corsair GmbH, from Elgato Systems, while Elgato Systems kept its smart home division and renamed the company to Eve Systems.

== Products ==
=== Thunderbolt Drive ===
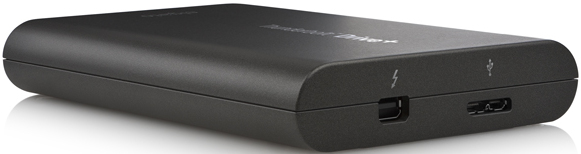
The Elgato Thunderbolt Drive+

Elgato introduced two external solid-state drives in September 2012 called Thunderbolt Drive. Benchmark tests by MacWorld and Tom's Hardware said that the hard drive was slower than other products they tested, despite being connected through a faster Thunderbolt port, rather than Firewire. The following year, in 2013, Elgato replaced them with similar drives identified as "Thunderbolt Drive +", which added USB 3.0 support and was claimed to be faster than the previous iteration. A CNET review of a Thunderbolt Drive+ drive gave it a 4.5 out of 5 star rating. It said the drive was "blazing fast" and "the most portable drive to date" but was also expensive. An article in The Register explained that the original drives introduced in 2012 did not perform well in benchmark tests, but the newer "plus" version had impressive speed results during testing.

=== Thunderbolt dock ===
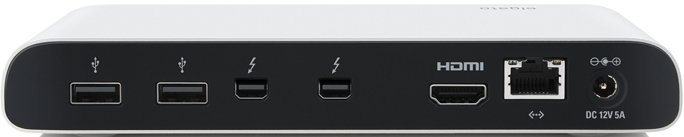
A rear view of the Elgato Thunderbolt dock showing the available ports

Elgato introduced a Thunderbolt docking station in June 2014. A computer is plugged into the dock using a Thunderbolt port in order to gain access to the dock's three USB ports, audio jacks, HDMI and Ethernet. It is typically used to plug a Macbook into an office setting (printer, monitor, keyboard) or to provide additional ports not available in the MacBook Air. A review in The Register said it was compact and useful, but Windows users should consider a USB 3.0 dock. The Register and CNET disagreed on whether it was competitively priced. Reviews in TechRadar and Macworld gave it 4 out of 5 stars.

=== Game capturing ===
Game Capture HD, which connects to gaming consoles to record gameplay, was introduced in 2012. It was created in response to gamers that were hacking EyeTV products for gameplay recording. The device connects between a gaming console and the TV and is powered by a USB connection. It captures video as the console sends it to the television, compresses and stores it. A review in iPhone Life gave it 4 out of 5 stars and noted that it could also be used to record iPad games with the right setup.

In October 2014, Elgato released a new version called HD 60. It recorded in 60 frames per second and 1080p high definition video (compared to the previous Game Capture HD's 1080p30 or 720p60), whereas typical low-end video game recording devices capture in 720p and 30 frames per second. The Telegraph gave it four out of five stars. A review in Gizmodo said that it captured extremely high-quality footage, but it may be higher-end than needed for many gamers that would be satisfied with the recording features built into the console.

In February 2024, Elgato released the 4K X, a new capture card which records in 144 frames per second and in 4K resolution. Gaming news website Dexerto rated the 4K X at five out of five stars, saying that it offered "a much needed upgrade over the older HD60 X."

=== Stream Deck ===
The Stream Deck is a customizable control pad, which can act as a programmable keyboard that lets the user create their own macros. It is designed to serve as a video game live streaming control device for online streamers. Each button displays customizable icons and labels, and can be mapped to specific functions like 'Open Program' or 'Mute Microphone', or perform multiple actions at once.

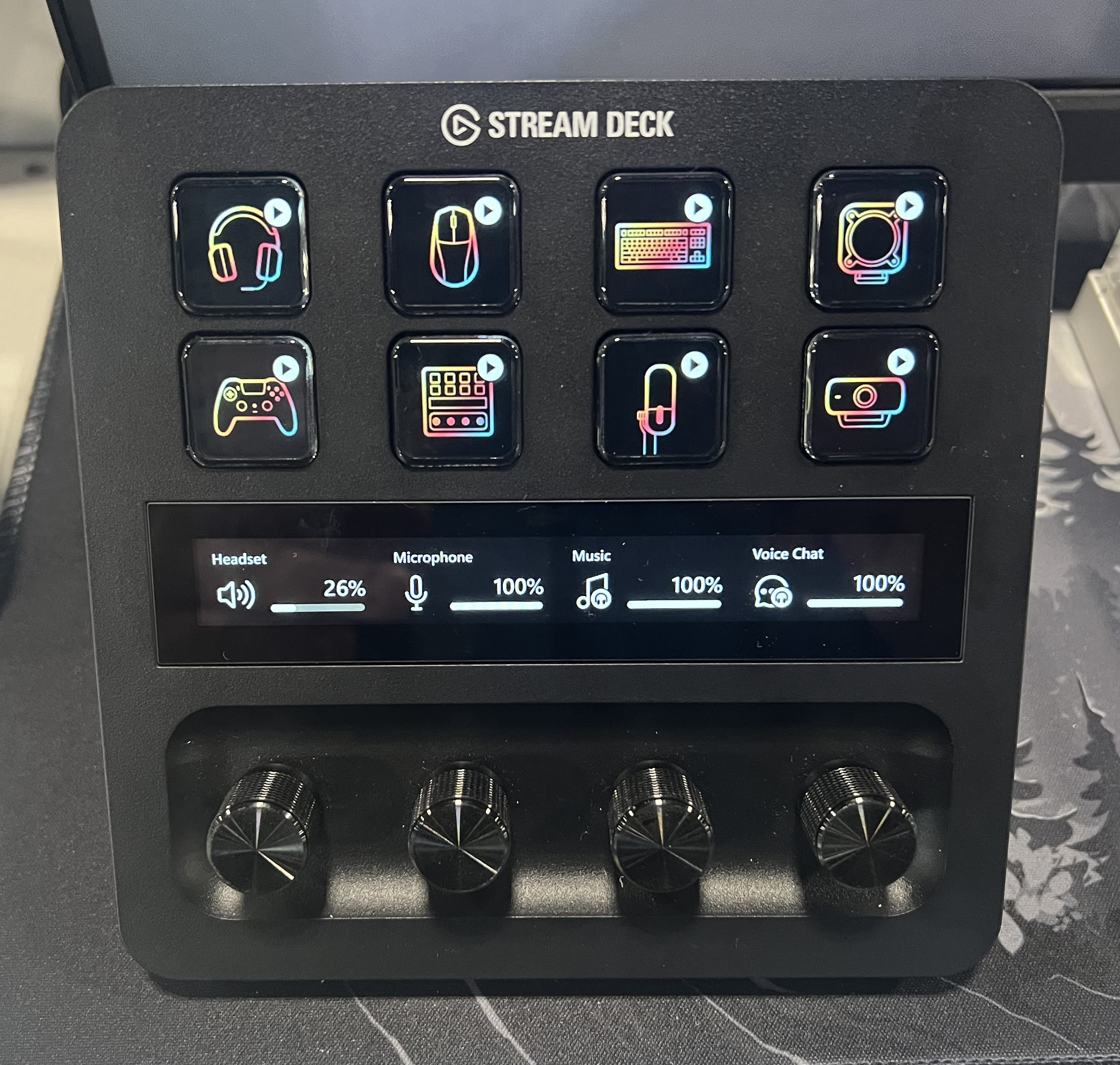
The Elgato Stream Deck +

Elgato has released multiple products under the Stream Deck name. Starting with the original Stream Deck on March 23, 2017, with 15 buttons, but continuing with the release of the Stream Deck Mini on July 24, 2018. Featuring six buttons and no stand the Stream Deck Mini would target a lower price point with all the same software features of the original Stream Deck. On May 28, 2019, Elgato would release the Stream Deck XL, a larger more expensive Stream Deck featuring 32 buttons and a magnetically attached removable stand, and the Stream Deck mobile app which presented 15 buttons on the user's phone via an Android and iOS app wirelessly connected to their PC. Both the Stream Deck XL and Stream Deck mobile app connected to the same software used by the original Stream Deck and Stream Deck Mini, with all of the same features.

In July, 2021 Elgato released an updated version of the original Stream Deck called the Stream Deck Mk.2. It featured the same 15 customizable buttons, a magnetically attached removable stand like the Stream Deck XL, and a removable face plate. Departing from Stream Deck's normal desktop format, in January 2022 Elgato released the Stream Deck Pedal, a device designed to be operated by the user's feet with three buttons, adjustable tension on each button, and no displays.

The Elgato Stream Deck: Discord Edition

On April 18, 2024, Elgato released the Stream Deck Neo as part of its Neo line of all-white products designed for productivity. The Stream Deck Neo has eight customizable keys and an infobar, a horizontal LCD screen that can display information such as the time, current action page, and more.

On November 10, 2025, Elgato released the Stream Deck Mini: Discord Edition which features Discord's "Blurple" color scheme, a free month of Discord Nitro for new users, and a preinstalled Discord profile that can control various in-app features from the device.

=== Green screens ===
Elgato offers a collapsible, ceiling-hung green screen. It is most commonly used by content creators on platforms like YouTube or Twitch.

=== Video lights ===
The Key Light and the Key Light Air are two models of video lights produced by Elgato. The Key Light Air is a lower budget, less powerful version of the Key Light. The Key Light has a maximum brightness of 2800 Lumens, while the Key Light Air is half as bright at 1400 Lumens.

Elgato also offers the Ring Light, which differs from the Key Light in that it is circular rather than rectangular, and features physical controls, while the Key Light and Key Light Air are controlled via app.

=== Microphones ===
The Elgato Wave Neo alongside the Elgato Stream Deck: Discord Edition

In June 2020, Elgato announced its expansion into microphones with the introduction of the Wave:1 and Wave:3. Both are USB microphones and were developed in partnership with Lewitt Audio. In September 2022, it released its first XLR microphone, called Wave DX, once again in cooperation with Lewitt Audio. In April 2024, Elgato introduced its new Neo line which included a microphone, the Wave Neo.

=== Desk chairs ===
In October 2025, Elgato released the Elgato Embrace desk chair.
