= Eve Systems =

German home automation producer

Eve Systems GmbH
- Formerly: Elgato Systems GmbH
- Type: Private
- Industry: Smart home
- Founded: June 27, 2018; 8 years ago
- Headquarters: Munich, Germany
- Owner: Independent (2018–23); ABB (2023–present)
- Website: evehome.com

Eve Systems GmbH (branded as Eve and formerly called Elgato Systems GmbH) is a German smart home and home automation producer founded on June 27, 2018.

The brand originally existed as a line of smart home products manufactured by Elgato Systems, a company best known for a line of video-recording and gaming products. The Elgato brand and gaming division of the company was sold to Corsair in June 2018, while the main company was renamed to Eve Systems retaining the Eve brand of smart home devices.

On June 12, 2023, ABB announced its acquisition of Eve Systems.

== History ==
=== EyeTV ===
The logo formerly used by Elgato Systems GmbH

Elgato Systems introduced the EyeTV brand in November 2002.

The first device was a small USB-powered device that contained a cable tuner and hardware encoder in order to convert television video into an MPEG-1 format for watching on a computer. It also had coaxial and RCA plugs to connect it with a VCR or camcorder. A 2002 article in Macworld said it was the "first step" in bridging computers and television, but at this point still had "some kinks".

The next device was the EyeTV 200 released in 2004. The EyeTV 200 allowed for digital remote control and converted programing into MPEG-2. The same year, Elgato released the Eye Home media server. By 2005, several other EyeTV products had been introduced, such as the EyeTV for DTT, the EyeTV EZ and the EyeTV Wonder.

In February 2016, Elgato sold EyeTV to Geniatech Europe GmbH, a wholly owned subsidiary of Shenzhen Geniatech Inc., Ltd.

=== Elgato Gaming ===
In 2012, the company introduced Game Capture HD, which connects to gaming consoles to record gameplay. It was created in response to gamers that were hacking EyeTV products for gameplay recording. In October 2014 Elgato released a new version called HD 60. It recorded in 60 frames per second and 1080p high definition video (compared to the previous Game Capture HD's 1080p30 or 720p60), whereas typical low-end video game recording devices capture in 720p and 30 frames per second.

In June 2018, the Elgato Gaming line of products and the Elgato brand were sold to Corsair, while the main company was renamed to Eve Systems retaining the Eve brand of smart home devices.

=== Eve ===
The Eve brand was introduced in 2014. Elgato also developed light bulbs that can respond to programming on a mobile device and respond to commands over Bluetooth. In May 2018, Elgato introduced Eve Aqua, a smart water controller.

In late 2014, Elgato introduced the Smart Power battery backup for mobile devices. It communicates with the user's Bluetooth-enabled device to provide notifications and calendar reminders when it needs to be charged.

=== Eve Systems ===
When the Elgato Gaming brand was split from the company and sold to Corsair in June 2018, the company renamed itself from Elgato Systems to Eve Systems, retaining its Eve smart home brand.

== Products ==
=== Smart key ===
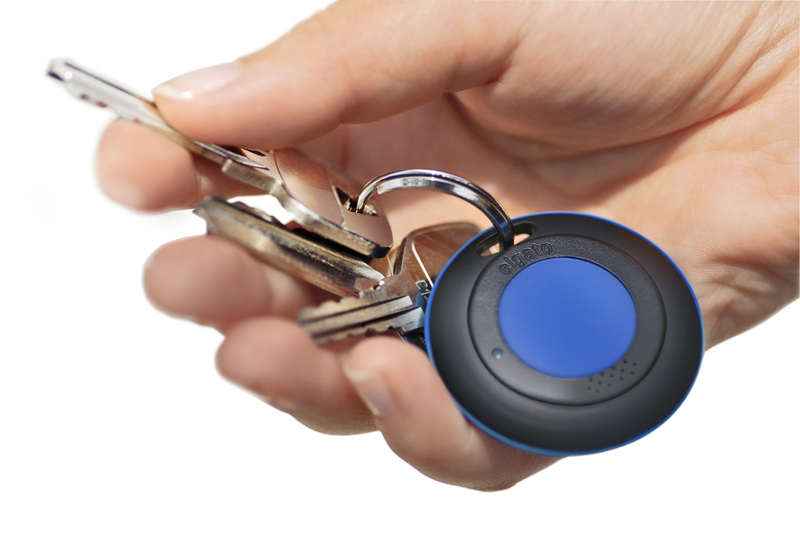
The smart key fob

Eve manufactures and markets a smart-key system. The system comes with a small 10-gram device that is placed on a key ring, in a purse, inside a car, or somewhere else. Then it communicates with an Elgato app on an iOS device. If it is set up for keys, the app will alert the user when they are 10 meters away from their keys, indicating that they may have forgotten them. It takes advantage of the "Smart Bluetooth" Apple implemented in iOS 7. A review in TheNextWeb said it was "money well spent" and worked "exactly as described", but that the beeping of the device could be louder and users will still need to supplement it with the Find my Phone app. A review in Macworld gave it 4 out of 5 stars.

=== Smart home ===
In September 2014, Elgato Systems announced a home monitoring system called Eve, which monitors a home's air pressure, water usage, temperature, air quality and other factors. It also introduced smart light bulbs, which communicate with iOS devices through Bluetooth and allow users to adjust home lighting from their mobile device. They are HomeKit-Enabled.

As of September 2023, the current series of smart home products includes:

- Eve Flare – portable smart LED lamp
- Eve Button – smart home remote
- Eve Door & Window – door and window sensor
- Eve Light Switch – smart wall switch
- Eve Motion – motion sensor
- Eve Room – indoor air quality, temperature, and humidity sensor
- Eve Thermo – radiator valve
- Eve Aqua – sprinkler controller
- Eve Play - Audio Streaming Interface
- Eve Energy - Smart plug
- Eve Energy Strip - Connected Triple Outlet
- Eve MotionBlinds - Upgrade Kit for Roller Blinds
- Eve Weather - Connected Weather Station
- Eve Light Strip - Smart LED Strip
- Eve Water Guard - Connected Water Leak Detector
- Eve Cam - Smart Indoor Camera
- Eve Outdoor Cam - Secure Floodlight Camera
- Eve Thermo Control - Temperature Sensor & Controller

=== Smart power ===
In late 2014, Elgato introduced the Smart Power battery backup for mobile devices. It communicates with the user's bluetooth-enabled device to provide notifications and calendar reminders when it needs to be charged.

In 2016, they released Eve Energy, a smart plug which provides power meter features through its mobile app.
