= Endor AG =

German video game peripherals manufacturer

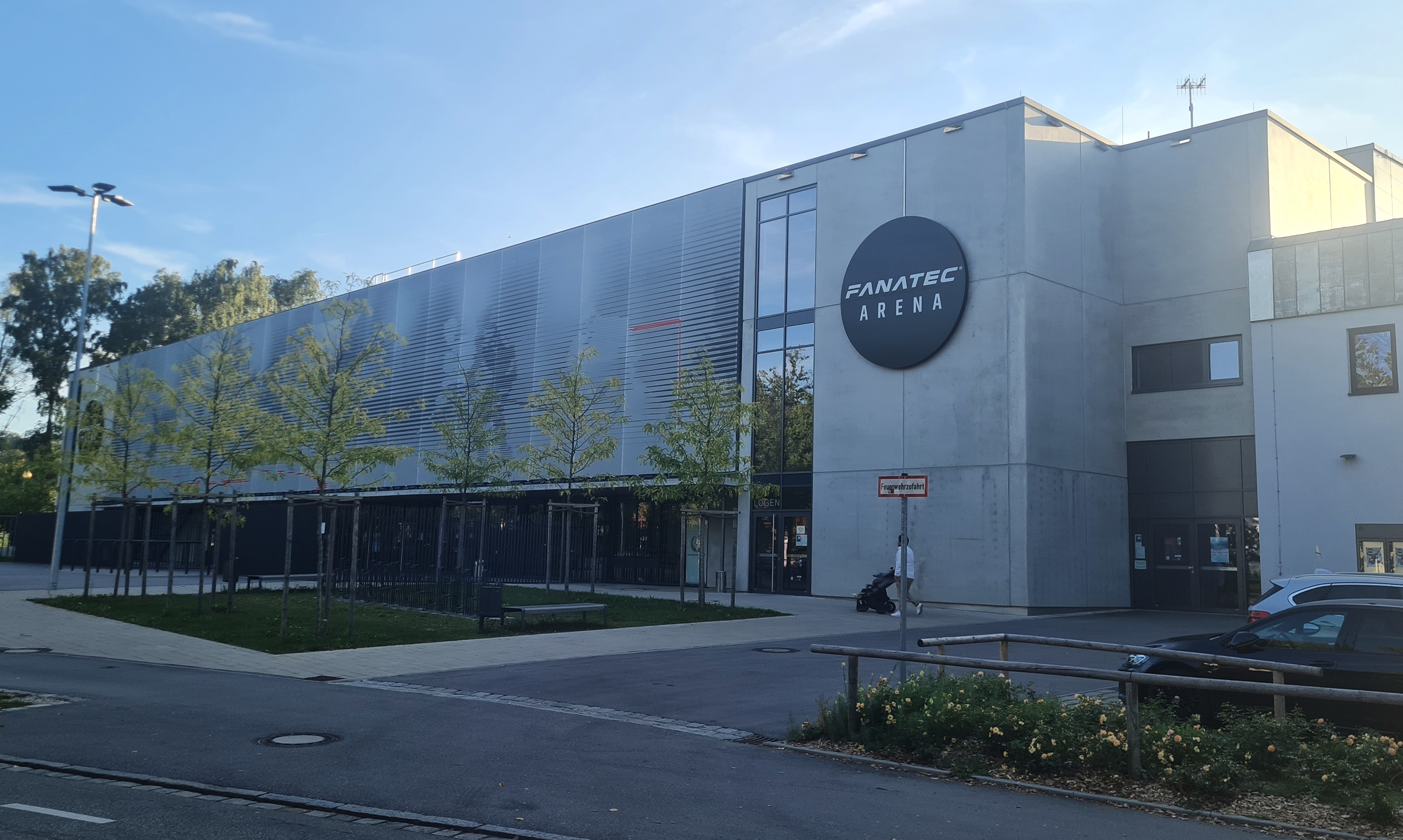
- Type: Public (AG)
- ISIN: DE0005491666
- Industry: Electronics
- Founded: October 1997
- Founder: Thomas Jackermeier
- Defunct: September 23, 2024
- Fate: Liquidated and acquired by Corsair Gaming
- Headquarters: E.ON-Allee 3, Landshut, Germany
- Key people: Matthias Kosch (CFO)
- Products: Sim racing game peripherals
- Brands: Fanatec
- Revenue: €81.3 million (2021)
- Owner: Thomas Jackermeier's family (50%)
- Number of employees: >165 (2021)
- Website: fanatec.com

Endor AG was a German electronics company founded in 1997 and headquartered in Landshut, Bavaria. The company manufactured and marketed gaming peripherals for racing simulators under the brand name Fanatec. The company filed for bankruptcy in July 2024, with the remaining business assets, including the Fanatec name, being purchased by gaming peripherals maker Corsair Gaming. Corsair liquidated the company in September 2024, with no jobs being lost and the Fanatec brand name continuing.

== History ==
Endor AG was established in October 1997 by German businessman Thomas Jackermeier. As an active player of early PC games, he very quickly recognised the decisive role that input devices would play in performance, reality, and fun. During the 1990s, Jackermeier argued that the stock of high quality sim racing devices was limited, so he decided to give up his wholesale biking store which was used to finance his educational degree during his time at the University of Regensburg while obtaining his Masters of Business Administration. Following this, he bought AB-Union which later renamed to Endor Ltd. and later the current Endor AG legal name, as well as the establishment of Fanatec, the company's flagship brand.

In the beginning, Endor sold a variety of PC peripherals, such as the Game Commander/Alpha Twin joystick and the licensed trackball for the Command & Conquer franchise. Following the successful release of the Le Mans wheel for PC, Endor began developing the first officially licensed wheel for the PlayStation system, Speedster 2. It was marketed directly by Sony Computer Entertainment Europe (SCEE) and gained major success. Endor later continued the relationship with SCEE with the development of the Speedster 3 wheel and the °G game controllers.

On June 27, 2006, Endor went public and traded over-the-counter on the Munich Stock Exchange, the Stuttgart Stock Exchange and the Hamburg Stock Exchange, while also restructured its corporate organization.

On March 28, 2024, Endor's board dismissed CEO Thomas Jackermeier, effective at the end of March 30 "fulfilling a key condition set by the lending banks for the extension of the standstill agreement" according to their notice.

On May 9, 2024, American manufacturer Corsair Gaming intended to acquire Endor AG, which included the Fanatec brand, pending the approval of German regulators.

By September 23, 2024, Corsair had acquired the company and all of its assets, and announced Endor AG would be wound up, with no jobs to be lost and the Fanatec brand name to continue.

== Products ==
Endor, through the Fanatec brand, manufactures and markets the sim racing game peripherals, such as racing wheels, shifters, pedals and cockpits, even under license from several automakers, such as BMW, McLaren and Porsche. All of products are applicable for most racing games, including the official licensed games based on the World Rally Championship, Formula 1, NASCAR and more.

== Sponsorships ==
Fanatec has since involved in the real-world motorsport competitions in addition of its long-time existence in the virtual racing industry. In July 2018, Fanatec became the official partner for the Formula 1, which sponsored the F1 Esports Series and supplied its gaming peripherals.

In January 2021, the SRO Motorsports Group named Fanatec as the title sponsor for the GT World Challenge, having previously been the official partner for the SRO E-Sports GT Series in 2020.

On May 18, 2023, Polyphony Digital, the developer of the Gran Turismo game series, partnered with Fanatec as the official steering wheel supplier for the 2023 Gran Turismo World Series along with the brand's appearance in the Brand Central which featured in Gran Turismo 7. Additionally, Fanatec also became the personal sponsor for 2018 FIA-Gran Turismo World Series Nations Cup champion Igor Fraga to give support for his career in the 2023 Super Formula Lights series.
