= Corsair Gaming =

American computer peripherals and hardware company

Corsair Gaming, Inc.

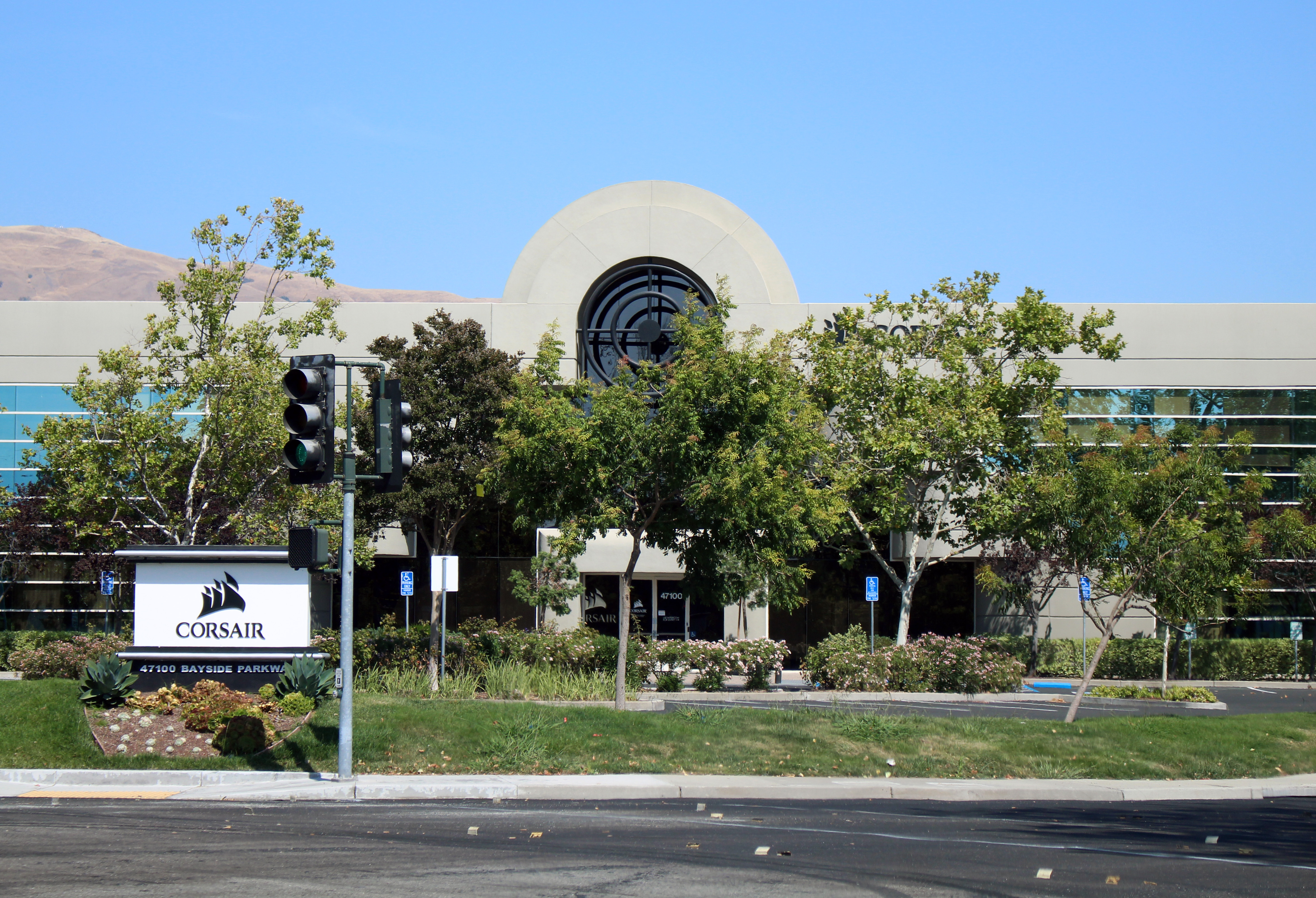
- Former headquarters in Fremont
- Type: Public
- Traded as: Nasdaq: CRSR; S&P 600 component
- Industry: Computer peripherals; Computer hardware; Computer storage; Computer memory
- Founded: January 1994; 32 years ago, in Fremont, California, U.S. (as Corsair Microsystems)
- Founders: Andy Paul; Don Lieberman; John Beekley
- Headquarters: Milpitas, California, U.S.
- Key people: Thi La (CEO); Michael Potter (CFO)
- Products: DRAM modules; Flash drives; ATX power supplies; SFX power supplies; Computer cases; CPU and memory cooling; Gaming case fans; Audio peripherals; Gaming keyboards; Gaming peripherals; Gaming monitors
- Revenue: ▼US$1.32 billion (2024)
- Operating income: ▼ −US$50 million (2024)
- Net income: ▼ −US$99 million (2024)
- Total assets: ▼US$1.24 billion (2024)
- Total equity: ▼US$604 million (2024)
- Owner: EagleTree Capital (56.8%)
- Number of employees: 2,567 (2024)
- Subsidiaries: Elgato; Origin PC; Drop; Fanatec; SCUF Gaming
- Website: corsair.com

Corsair Gaming, Inc. (stylized as CORSAIR) is an American computer peripherals and gaming brand headquartered in Milpitas, California. Previously known as Corsair Components and Corsair Memory, it was incorporated in California in January 1994 originally as Corsair Microsystems and reincorporated in Delaware in 2007. The company designs and sells a range of computer products, including high-speed DRAM modules, power supplies (PSUs), USB flash drives, CPU/GPU and case cooling, gaming peripherals (such as keyboards and computer mice), computer cases, solid-state drives (SSDs), and speakers.

It leases a production facility in Taoyuan City, Taiwan, for assembly, testing and packaging of select products, with distribution centers in North America, Europe, and Asia and sales and marketing offices in major markets worldwide. It trades under the ticker symbol CRSR on the NASDAQ stock exchange. Lockdown orders associated with the COVID-19 pandemic, and a rise in demand for computing equipment, including the computer gaming sector, led to a significant short-term increase in Corsair's revenue.

== History ==
The company was founded as Corsair Microsystems Inc. in 1994 by Andy Paul, Don Lieberman, and John Beekley. Corsair originally developed level 2 cache modules, called cache on a stick (COASt) modules, for OEMs. After Intel incorporated the L2 cache in the processor with the release of its Pentium Pro processor family, Corsair changed its focus to DRAM modules, primarily in the server market. This effort was led by Richard Hashim, one of the early employees at Corsair. In 2002, Corsair began shipping DRAM modules that were designed to appeal to computer enthusiasts, who were using them for overclocking. Since then, Corsair has continued to produce memory modules for PCs, and has added other PC components as well.

Corsair expanded its DRAM memory module production into the high end market for overclocking. This expansion allows for high power platforms and the ability to get more performance out of the CPU and RAM. The Corsair Vengeance Pro series and Corsair Dominator Platinum series are built for overclocking applications.

Corsair has since expanded its product line to include many types of high-end gaming peripherals, high performance air and water cooling solutions, and other enthusiast-grade components. Around 2009, Corsair contacted CoolIT Systems to integrate its liquid cooling technology into Corsair's offerings which resulted in a long-term partnership.

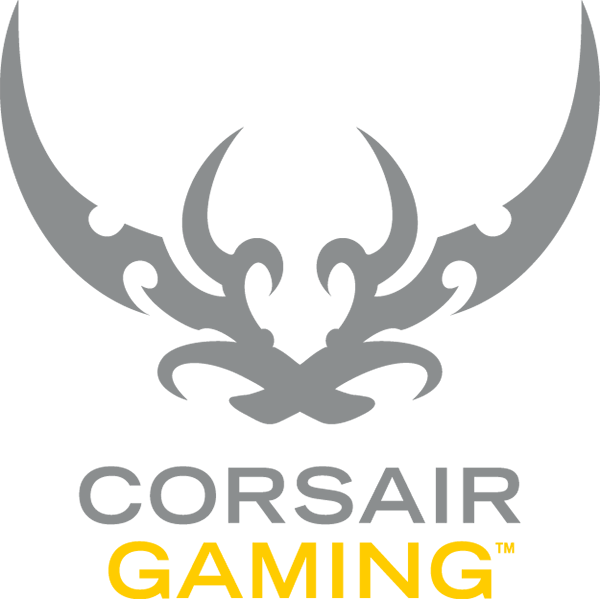
Second logo of Corsair Gaming, used in 2015

In 2015, Corsair changed its logo from the original sail design to a design featuring crossed swords. However, after community backlash, the change was promptly reversed, and led to the current company logo.

In May 2021, Corsair announced that it will relocate its headquarters from Fremont to Milpitas, with the new lease stated to take effect in March 2022. In August 2024, Corsair laid off 90 employees.

== Acquisitions ==
Old logo of Corsair Components, used until June 1, 2015

On July 26, 2017, EagleTree Capital entered into an agreement to acquire a majority stake in Corsair from Francisco Partners and several other minority shareholders in a deal valued at $525 million. Corsair Founder and CEO Andy Paul retains his equity stake and remains in his role as CEO.

On June 27, 2018, Corsair announced that it will be acquiring Elgato Gaming from the Munich-based company Elgato Systems, which it renamed to Corsair GmbH after the acquisition. The original Elgato Systems company retained its Eve home automation division and was subsequently renamed to Eve Systems.

On July 24, 2019, it was announced that Corsair had acquired custom PC builder Origin PC. In February 2024, Corsair announced it would be moving Origin PC's manufacturing operations to Atlanta and closing its facility in Miami. As a result, 55 employees were laid off.

On December 16, 2019, Corsair announced its acquisition of game controller manufacturer SCUF Gaming.

On August 21, 2020, Corsair filed registration documents with the U.S. Securities and Exchange Commission for a planned $100 million IPO.

On July 17, 2023, Corsair announced that it had acquired the online retailer Drop (formerly known as Massdrop).

On September 16, 2024, Corsair announced that it was set to acquire the Fanatec product line from Endor AG, which completed on September 23.

In July 2025, Andy Paul retired and Thi La, the company's former president, took over as CEO.

== Products ==
Since the custom computer industry has experienced an increased interest in products with RGB lighting, Corsair has added this feature to almost all of their product lines. In the gaming industry, Corsair has its biggest share of the market in memory modules (around 44%) and gaming keyboards (around 14%).

== See also ==
- List of computer hardware manufacturers
