= MARCS Institute for Brain, Behaviour, and Development =

The MARCS Institute for Brain, Behaviour, and Development is a research organization of Western Sydney University. The institute is based in the "iQ": the Westmead Innovation Quarter (in Westmead, New South Wales). It focuses on a number of areas including health, data, and space and defence. MARCS has multiple specialized research centers; its International Centre for Neuromorphic Systems has developed technology used in space.

== Description ==
The MARCS Institute for Brain, Behaviour, and Development is a research organization of Western Sydney University. It is based in the "iQ"—the Westmead Innovation Quarter (in Westmead, New South Wales) established in 2022—along with NICM Health Research Institute, CSIRO, Telstra Health, WentWest, and Psych Central. The institute's vision is to "optimise human interaction and wellbeing across the lifespan".

=== Areas of focus ===
The MARCS Institute focuses on these areas:

- Health
- Data
- Space and defence
- Early life and aged care
- Art and music sciences
- Human communication

== Centres ==
Specialized research centers and labs within MARCS include:

- The Age Lab
- Baby Lab
- International Centre for Neuromorphic Systems (ICNS)

ICNS researchers developed the first neuromorphic vision sensor to operate from space on the International Space Station, and a novel method for space domain awareness using neuromorphic vision sensors in astrosites (mobile telescope observatories built specifically to track and detect objects in space).
