= Virtual acoustic space =

Headphone spacialization technique

Virtual acoustic space (VAS), also known as virtual auditory space, is a technique in which sounds presented over headphones appear to originate from any desired direction in space. The illusion of a virtual sound source outside the listener's head is created.

== Sound localization cues generate an externalized percept ==
When one listens to sounds over headphones (in what is known as the "closed field") the sound source appears to arise from center of the head. On the other hand, under normal, so-called free-field, listening conditions sounds are perceived as being externalized. The direction of a sound in space (see sound localization) is determined by the brain when it analyses the interaction of incoming sound with head and external ears. A sound arising to one side reaches the near ear before the far ear (creating an interaural time difference, ITD), and will also be louder at the near ear (creating an interaural level difference, ILD – also known as interaural intensity difference, IID). These binaural cues allow sounds to be lateralized. Although conventional stereo headphone signals make used of ILDs (not ITDs) the sound is not perceived as being externalized.

The perception of an externalized sound source is due to the frequency and direction-dependent filtering of the pinna which makes up the external ear structure. Unlike ILDs and ITDs, these spectral localization cues are generated monaurally. The same sound presented from different directions will produce at the eardrum a different pattern of peaks and notches across frequency. The pattern of these monaural spectral cues is different for different listeners. Spectral cues are vital for making elevation judgments and distinguishing if a sound arose from in front or behind the listener. They are also vital for creating the illusion of an externalized sound source. Since only ILDs are present in stereo recordings, the lack of spectral cues means that the sound is not perceived as being externalized. The easiest way of re-creating this illusion is to make a recording using two microphones placed inside a dummy human head. Playing back the recording via headphones will create the illusion of an externalized sound source.

== VAS creates the perception of an externalized sound source ==
VAS emulates the dummy head technique via digital signal processing. The VAS technique involves two stages: estimating the transfer functions of the head from difference directions, and playing sounds through VAS filters with similar transfer functions.

1. The ILDs, ITDs, and spectral cues make up what is known as the head-related transfer function (HRTF) which defines how the head and outer ears filter incoming sound. The HRTF can be measured by placing miniature probe microphones into the subject's ears and recording the impulse responses to broad-band sounds presented from a range of directions in space. Since head size and outer ear shape vary between listeners a more accurate effect can be created by individualizing the VAS filters in this way. However, a foreign HRTF or an average HRTF taken over many listeners is still very effective.
2. The bank of HRTF impulse responses are now be converted into a filter bank of some sort. Any desired sound can now be convolved with one of these filters and played to a listener over headphones. This creates the perception of an externalised sound source. This approach has obvious advantages over the "dummy head technique", most notably the fact that once the filter bank has been obtained it can be applied to any desired sound source.

== Uses for VAS in science ==
In addition to obvious uses in the home entertainment market, VAS has been used to study how the brain processes sound source location. For example, at the Oxford Auditory Neuroscience Lab scientists have presented VAS-filtered sounds whilst recording from neurons in the auditory cortex and mid-brain.

== See also ==
- Sound localization
- acoustic space
- Auralization
