= EKV MOSFET model =

Mathematical model

The EKV Mosfet model is a mathematical model of metal-oxide semiconductor field-effect transistors (MOSFET) which is intended for circuit simulation and analog circuit design. It was developed in the Swiss EPFL by Christian C. Enz, François Krummenacher and Eric A. Vittoz (hence the initials EKV) around 1995 based in part on work they had done in the 1980s. Unlike simpler models like the Quadratic Model, the EKV Model is accurate even when the MOSFET is operating in the subthreshold region (e.g. when V_{bulk}=V_{source} then the MOSFET is subthreshold when V_{gate-source} < V_{Threshold}). In addition, it models many of the specialized effects seen in submicrometre CMOS IC design.

== See also ==
- Transistor models
- Ngspice
- SPICE
