= List of Logitech products =

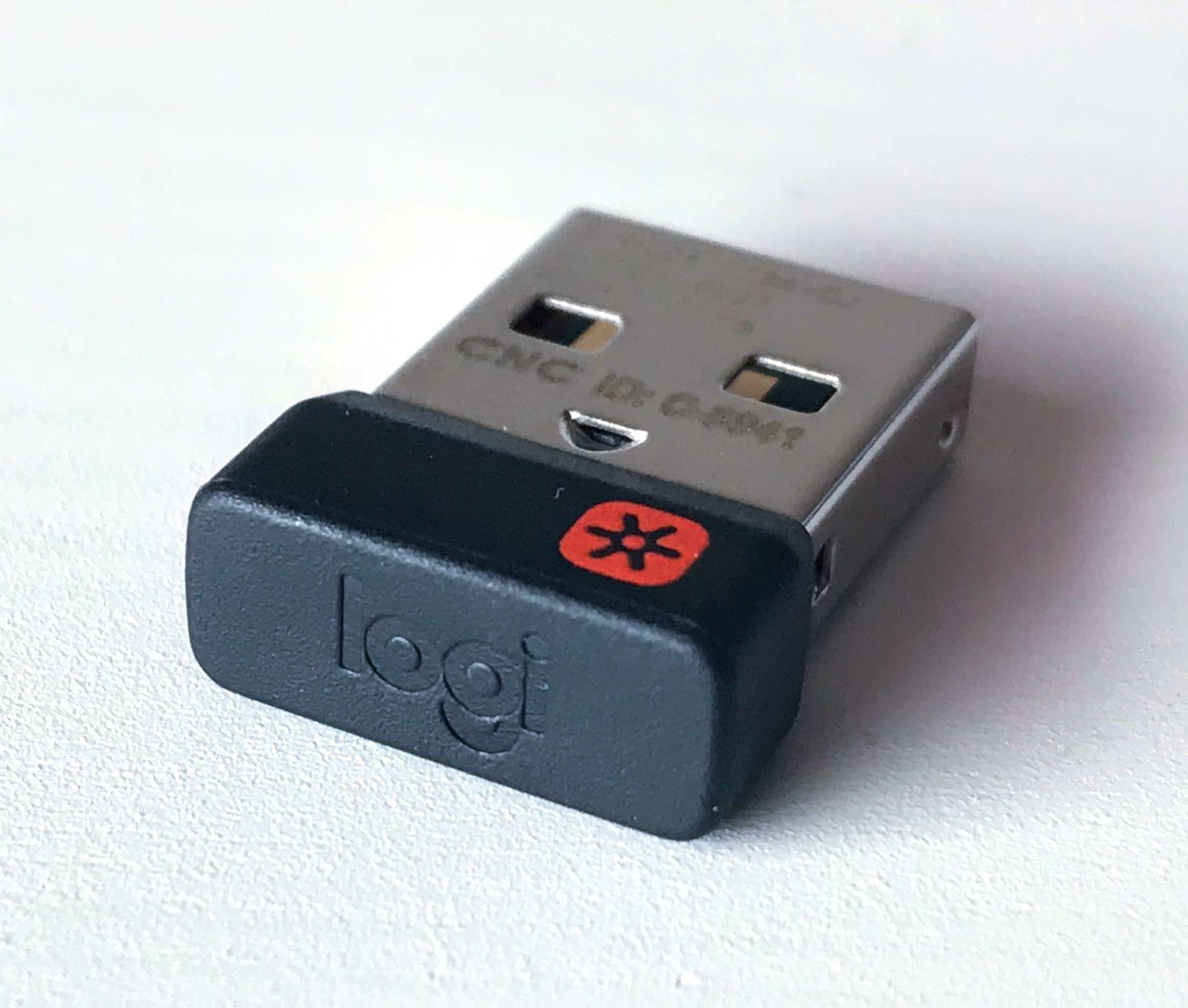
The Logitech Unifying Receiver is a USB plug that can listen to several computer peripherals such as mice and keyboards.

This is a list of various Logitech products. Individual products may have their own article.

== Software ==
- Logitech MouseWare
- Logitech SetPoint
- Logitech Unifying Software
- Logitech Control Center (LCC)
  Compatible: macOS 10.8-11.0.
- Logitech Options
  Compatible: Windows 7 or later, macOS 10.8 or later.
- Logitech Options+
  Compatible: Windows 10 or later, macOS 10.15 or later.
- Logitech Gaming Software
  Compatible: Windows 7 or later, macOS 10.8-10.15.
- Logitech G Hub
  Compatible: Windows 7 or later, macOS 10.13 or later.
- Logi AI Prompt Builder
  Compatible: Windows 10 or later, macOS 12 or later.

== Pointing devices ==
=== Ball mice ===
Product title	Release year	Buttons	Scroll wheel	Sensor type	Wireless	Batteries	Remarks
P4	1982	3	No	Opto-mechanical	Wired	—N/a	1st Logitech mouse
C7	1985	3	No	Opto-mechanical	Wired	—N/a	1st mouse sold under Logitech name
S9	1989	3	No		Wired	—N/a	1st mouse with Logitech logo
First Mouse		2	No	Opto-mechanical	Wired	—N/a	
MouseMan	1990	3	No	Opto-mechanical	Wired	—N/a	
MouseMan Bus		3	No	Opto-mechanical	Wired	—N/a	Includes Serial Bus board
MouseMan Sensa		3	No	Opto-mechanical	Wired	—N/a	Special shell design
Cordless MouseMan	c.1991	3	No	Opto-mechanical	RF	?	1st wireless mouse
MouseMan96	c.1996	3	No	Opto-mechanical	Wired	—N/a	
Cordless MouseMan96	c.1996	3	No	Opto-mechanical	RF	?	
Cordless MouseMan Pro	c.1997	3	No	Opto-mechanical	RF	2×AAA	
MouseMan for Notebooks	c.1997	3	No	Opto-mechanical	Wired	—N/a	
First Mouse+	c.1998	3	Yes	Opto-mechanical	Wired	—N/a	
USB Wheel Mouse	c.1998	3	Yes	Opto-mechanical	Wired / USB	—N/a	
Wheel Mouse for Notebooks	c.1999	3	Yes	Opto-mechanical	Wired	—N/a	
Cordless Wheel Mouse	c.1999	3	Yes	Opto-mechanical	RF	2×AAA	
Mouseman Wheel	c.1999	4	Yes	Opto-mechanical	Wired / USB	—N/a	
Cordless Mouseman Wheel	1999	4	Yes	Opto-mechanical	RF	2×AAA	

=== Optical mice ===
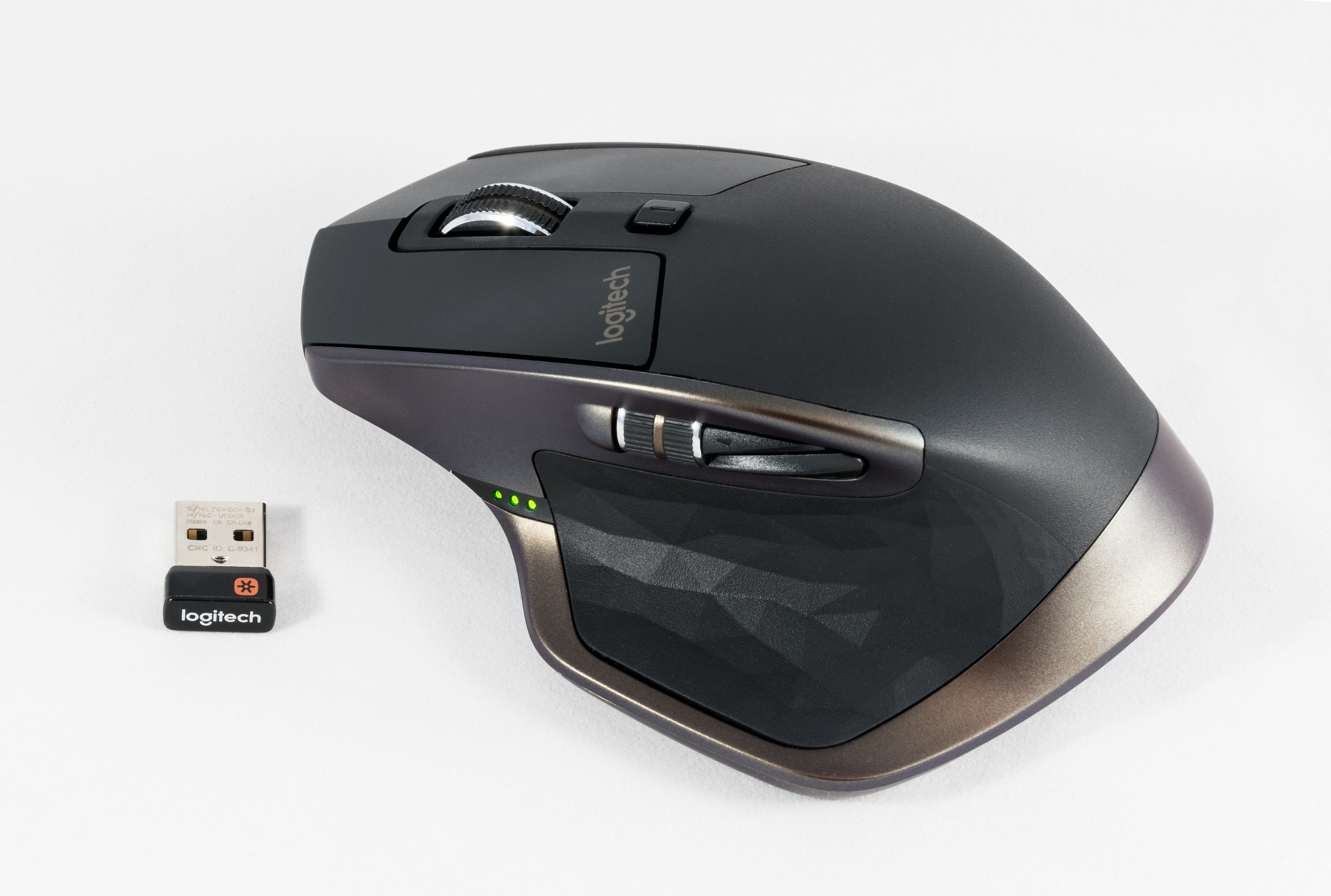
Logitech MX Master from 2015

Product title	Release year	Buttons	Scroll wheel	Sensor type	Resolution (dpi)	Wireless	Batteries	Remarks	References
Optical Mouse	2000	3	Yes	Optical	?	Wired	—N/a		
MouseMan Traveler	2001	3	Yes	Optical	?	Wired	—N/a		
iFeel Mouse	2000	3	Yes	Optical	800	Wired	—N/a	Has tactile feedback	
iFeel MouseMan	2000	4	Yes	Optical	800	Wired	—N/a	Has tactile feedback	
Cordless Optical Mouse	2000	3	Yes	Optical	800	RF	2×AA		
Cordless Optical Mouse for Notebooks		3	Yes	Optical	?	RF	2×AA		
Cordless MouseMan Optical	2001	4	Yes	Optical	800	RF	2×AA		
MouseMan Dual Optical	2001	4	Yes	2×optical	800	Wired	—N/a		
Click Optical Mouse		4	Yes	Optical	?	Wired	—N/a		
Cordless Click Optical Mouse		4	Yes	Optical	?	RF	2×AA		
Wheel Mouse Optical	c.2002?	3	Yes	Optical	?	Wired	—N/a		
Cordless Click Plus Optical Mouse	2002	6	Yes	Optical	?	RF	2×AA		
Mini Optical Mouse	2002	3	Yes	Optical	?	Wired	—N/a		
Cordless Presenter	2002	4	Buttons (Note: The device has no physical scroll wheel, but two buttons are used for scrolling.)	Optical	?	Bluetooth	2×AA	Designed to work as a presenter	
MX300	2002	4	Yes	Optical	400	Wired	—N/a	Replaced by MX310	
MX500	2002	8	Yes	Optical	400	Wired	—N/a	Replaced by MX510	
MX700	2002	8	Yes	Optical	400	FastRF 2.4 GHz	NiMH Rechargeable AA×2	Replaced by MX1000	
MX900	2003	8	Yes	Optical	800	Bluetooth	NiMH Rechargeable	Replaced by MX1000	
MX310	2003	6	Yes	Optical	400	Wired	—N/a		
MX510	2004	8	Yes	Optical	800	Wired	—N/a	Replaced by MX518	
Notebook Optical Mouse Plus	2004	3	Yes	Optical	?	Wired	—N/a	Cord wraps around body	
Optical Mouse V2	2004	3	Yes	Optical	?	Wired	—N/a		
Cordless Optical Mouse V2	2004	3	Yes	Optical	?	RF	2×AA		
Ladybug Mouse	2004	3	Yes	Optical	?	Wired	—N/a		
Football Mouse	2004	3	Yes	Optical	?	Wired	—N/a		
MX1000	2004	10	Yes	Laser	800	Bluetooth	Li-ion Rechargeable	Replaced by MX1100; incorporated a short wavelength laser from Agilent Technologies	
MediaPlay Cordless Mouse	2004	14	Yes	Optical	?	RF	2×AA	Designed as a Media Center remote	
V500 Cordless Notebook Mouse	2004	2	Touch strip	Optical	1000	RF	2×AAA		
Cordless Click Optical Mouse V2	2005	6	Yes	Optical	800	RF	2×AA		
Cordless Click Plus Optical Mouse V2	2005	8	Yes	Optical	800	RF	2×AA		
Cordless Mini Optical Mouse	2005	5	Yes	Optical	800	RF	1×AA		
MX400	2006	7	Yes	Laser	800	Wired	—N/a		
MX600	2006	8	Yes	Laser	800	RF	2×AA	Replaced by MX610	
MX610 Laser Cordless Mouse	2006	10	Yes	Laser	1000	RF	2×AA	Replaced by MX620	
MX610 Left-Hand Laser Cordless Mouse	2006	10	Yes	Laser	1000	RF	2×AA	Shape curved for Left hand use	
V450 Laser Cordless Mouse for Notebooks	2006	5	Yes	Laser	1000	RF	2×AA		
LX3 Optical Mouse	2006	5	Yes	Optical	1000	Wired	—N/a		
LX7 Cordless Optical Mouse	2006	7	Yes	Optical	?	RF	2×AA		
V100 Optical Mouse for Notebooks	2006	5	Yes	Optical	800	Wired	—N/a		
V150 Laser Mouse for Notebooks	2006	5	Yes	Laser	?	Wired	—N/a		
V200 Cordless Optical Notebook Mouse	2006	5	Yes	Optical	?	RF	2×AA		
V270 Cordless Optical Notebook Mouse for Bluetooth	2006	5	Yes	Optical	?	Bluetooth	2×AA		
MX Revolution	2006	7	Free spinning (toggled by software - various methods available)	IR laser	800	2.4 GHz	LY11, L-LL11	A Bluetooth (rather than RF) version of this mouse was bundled with the MX5500 keyboard starting in 2008. Replaced by Performance Mouse MX in 2009.	
VX Revolution	2006	10	Free spinning (toggled by mechanical switch)	IR laser	800	QUAD 2.4 GHz	1×AA	Released in celebration of Logitech's 25th anniversary. First Logitech mouse to feature a free-spinning alloy scroll wheel.	
VX Nano	2007	7	Free spinning (toggled by mechanical switch)	IR laser	800	QUAD/eQUAD 2.4 GHz	2×AAA	Amongst the first to feature a nano receiver.	
MX Air	2007	8	Touch strip	Laser	800	2.4 GHz	Rechargeable	Has built in gyroscope. Allows control of cursor by waving the mouse through the air.	
MX620	2007	8	Free spinning (toggled by mechanical switch)	Laser	1000	2.4 GHz	2×AA		
V220 Cordless Optical Notebook Mouse	2007	5	Yes	Optical	1000	RF	1×AA		
V320 Cordless Optical Mouse for Notebooks	2007	5	Yes	Optical	?	RF	2×AAA		
V470 Cordless Laser Mouse for Notebooks	2007	5	Yes	Laser	?	Bluetooth	2×AA		
MX1100	2008	8	Free spinning (toggled by mechanical switch)	Laser	1600	2.4 GHz	2×AA		
V550 Nano Cordless Laser Mouse for Notebooks	2008	5	Free spinning (toggled by mechanical switch)	Laser	?	2.4 GHz	2×AA		
Performance Mouse MX	2009	9	Free spinning (toggled by mechanical switch)	Darkfield Laser	100-1500	Unifying	1×AA NiMH (rechargeable); non-rechargeable AAs not supported	One of the first two mice introduced in 2009 to feature a Darkfield Laser. Replaced by MX Master in 2015.	
Anywhere Mouse MX	2009	7	Free spinning (toggled by mechanical switch)	Darkfield Laser	1000	Unifying	2×AA	Batteries last 2–4 months.	
Bluetooth Mouse M555b	2009	5	Free spinning (toggled by mechanical switch)	Laser	?	Bluetooth	2×AA		
V220 Cordless Optical Mouse for Notebooks	2009	5	Yes	Optical	?	RF	1×AA		
LX6 Cordless Optical Mouse	2009	5	Yes	Optical	?	RF	2×AA		
LX8 Cordless Laser Mouse	2009	7	Yes	Laser	?	RF	2×AA		
LS1 Laser Mouse M150	2009	5	Yes	Laser	1100	Wired	—N/a		
Wireless Mouse M205	2009	3	Yes	Optical	?	RF	1x AA		
Corded Mouse M500 / M500s	2009	7	Free spinning (toggled by mechanical switch)	IR laser	1000	Wired	—N/a	M500s is the successor and has different sensor	
Wireless Mouse M510	2010	7	Yes	Laser	?	Unifying	2×AA		
Wireless Mouse M310	2010	3	Yes	Laser	1000	Unifying	1×AA		
Mouse M125	2010	5	Yes	Optical	?	Wired	—N/a	Cord Retractable	
Marathon Mouse M705	2010	8	Free spinning (toggled by mechanical switch)	Laser	1000	Unifying	2×AA (can function with just one)	Re-released in 2017. The new model uses Logitech Options instead of SetPoint, and the programmable thumb button got removed. 3-year battery life on 2 AA batteries.	
Wireless Mouse M215	2010	3	Yes	Optical	1000	RF	1×AA	Same thing as M205 but with the Nano receiver	
Wireless Mouse M235	2010	5	Yes	Optical	?	Unifying	1xAA	Re-released around 2023	
Wireless Mouse M505	2010	5	Yes	Laser	?	Unifying	2×AA		
Wireless Mouse M305	2010	3	Yes	Optical	?	RF	1×AA		
Mouse M110	2010	5	Yes	Optical	?	Wired	—N/a		
Mouse M100	2010	3	Yes	Optical	1000	Wired	—N/a		
Mouse B100 for Business	2010	3	Yes	Optical	800	Wired		Same thing as M100 but with lower DPI	
Mouse M90	2010	3	Yes	Optical	?	Wired	—N/a	Re-released in 2021	
Wireless Mouse M315	2011	3	Yes	Optical	?	RF	1×AA		
Wireless Mouse M317	2011	3	Yes	Optical	1000	RF	1×AA		
Wireless Mouse M325	2011	3	Micro-precise	Optical	1000	Unifying	1×AA	As of 2016, has a variant called the "Party Collection" M325c which comes in several vibrant, themed designs	
Wireless Mouse M185	2011	3	Yes	Optical	1000	RF	1×AA	Was updated with Logitech's new logo Since 2021 the mouse was made cheaper by updating the insides and moving the power switch under the optical sensor.	
Couch Mouse M515	2011	5	Yes	Optical	?	Unifying	2×AA	Sealed bottom, Hand detection	
Wireless Mouse M525	2011	5	Micro-precise	Advanced optical	1000	Unifying	2×AA (Can function with just one)		
Cube	2012	1	Yes	Optical	?	Wired	Li-Po rechargeable		
M105 Corded Mouse	2012	3	Yes	Optical	?	Wired	—N/a	Was updated with Logitech's new logo	
Touch Mouse M600	2012	1	Touch surface	Optical	?	Unifying	2×AA	Multi-touch surface	
Zone Touch Mouse T400	2012	2	Touch strip	Optical	?	Unifying	2×AA		
Touch Mouse T620	2012		Touch surface	Optical	?	Unifying	2×AA	Multi-touch surface	
Ultrathin Touch Mouse T630	2013	1	Touch surface	Optical	?	Bluetooth	Li-Po Rechargeable	Multi-touch surface	
Wireless Mouse M560	2013	7	Free spinning (toggled by mechanical switch)	Optical	?	Unifying	1×AA		
Wireless Mini Mouse M187	2014	3	Yes	Optical	1000	RF	1×AAA		
Wireless Mouse M275	2014	3	Yes	Optical	1000	RF	1×AA		
Wireless Mouse M280	2014	3	Yes	Optical	1000	RF	1×AA		
Wireless Mouse M320	2014	3	Yes	Optical	1000	RF	1×AA		
MX Master	2015	7	Free spinning (toggled by software - various methods available)	Darkfield Laser	400-1600	Unifying / Bluetooth 4.0	Rechargeable Li-Po (500 mAh) battery	Enough power for full day in 4 minutes charge. Full charge can last 40 days. Able to connect to three separate devices. Replaced by MX Master 2S in 2017	
MX Anywhere 2	2015	7	Free spinning (toggled by mechanical switch)	Darkfield Laser	400-1600	Unifying / Bluetooth 4.0	Rechargeable Li-Po (500 mAh) battery	Full charge can last 2 months.	
M335 Wireless Mouse	2015	5	Yes	Optical	1000	RF	1×AA		
M337/M535 Bluetooth Mouse	2015	5	Yes	Optical	1000	Bluetooth 3.0	1×AA	Model name varies depending on country/channel	
M170/M171 Wireless Mouse	2015	3	Yes	Optical	1000	RF	1×AA	Model name varies depending on country/channel.	
M720 Triathlon/Precision Pro	2016	8	Free spinning (toggled by mechanical switch)	Optical	1000	Unifying / Bluetooth 4.0	1×AA	Full battery can last for a rated 24 months. Can be connected to up to three devices. Logitech Flow compatible,	
M220 Silent	2016	3	Yes	Optical	1000	RF	1×AA	Comes with near-silent click buttons, full battery is rated to last 18 months, same shell as M185	
M221 Silent	2016	3	Yes	Optical	1000	RF	1×AA	Basically the same thing as the M220 Silent.	
M330 Silent Plus	2016	3	Yes	Optical	1000	Unifying	1×AA	Comes with near-silent click buttons, full battery is rated to last 24 months, same shell as M320	
M557 Bluetooth Mouse		6	Yes	Optical	1000	Bluetooth	2×AA	Full battery is rated to last 12 months	
MX Master 2S	2017	7	Free spinning (toggled by software - various methods available)	Darkfield Laser	400-4000	Unifying / Bluetooth 4.0	Rechargeable Li-Po (500 mAh) battery	Full charge can last 70 days. Able to connect to three separate devices. Logitech Flow compatible Replaced by MX Master 3 in 2019	
MX Anywhere 2S	2017	7	Free spinning (toggled by mechanical switch)	Darkfield Laser	400-4000	Unifying / Bluetooth 4.0	Rechargeable Li-Po (500 mAh) battery	Full charge can last 70 days. Able to connect to three separate devices. Logitech Flow compatible	
M585	2017	6	Yes	Optical	1000	Unifying	1×AA	Able to connect to two separate devices. Logitech Flow compatible	
M590 Silent	2017	6	Yes	Optical	1000	Unifying	1×AA	Able to connect to two separate devices. Logitech Flow compatible	
M110 Silent	2018	3	Yes	Optical	1000	Wired	—N/a	SilentTouch technology: mouse have the same click feel without the click noise–over 90% noise reduction	
MX Vertical	2018	4	Yes	Optical	400–4000	Unifying / Bluetooth 4.2 / USB-C wired	Rechargeable Li-Po (240 mAh) battery	Ergonomic design with 57° vertical angle to reduce wrist pressure and forearm strain by 10 percent. 4000 DPI sensor with cursor-speed switch, Easy-Switch and Flow support, USB-C fast charging (4-month battery life). Tested and approved by ergonomists.	
MX Master 3	2019	7	Free spinning (toggled by software - various methods available)	Darkfield Laser	200-4000	Unifying / Bluetooth 4.0	Rechargeable Li-Po (500 mAh) battery	Full charge can last 70 days. Able to connect to three separate devices. Logitech Flow compatible	
MX Master 3 for Mac	2020	7	Free spinning (toggled by software - various methods available)	Darkfield Laser	200-4000	Bluetooth 4.0	Rechargeable Li-Po (500 mAh) battery	Full charge can last up to 70 days. Able to connect to three separate devices. Logitech Flow compatible	
MX Anywhere 3	2020	6	Free spinning (toggled by mechanical switch or autoshift via software)	Darkfield Laser	200-4000	Unifying / Bluetooth	Rechargeable Li-Po (500 mAh) battery	Full charge can last up to 70 days. Able to connect to three separate devices. Logitech Flow compatible	
MX Anywhere 3 for Mac	2020	6	Free spinning (toggled by mechanical switch or autoshift via software)	Darkfield Laser	200-4000	Bluetooth	Rechargeable Li-Po (500 mAh) battery	Full charge can last up to 70 days. Able to connect to three separate devices. Logitech Flow compatible	
M190 Full-Size Wireless Mouse	2020	3	Yes	Optical	1000	RF	1x AA		
Signature M650 for Business	2021	5	Free spinning (toggled by software - various methods available)	Darkfield Laser	?	?	?	?	
MX Master 3s for Business	2021	7	Free spinning (toggled by software - various methods available)	Darkfield Laser	200-4000	Bolt / Bluetooth 5.0	Rechargeable Li-Po (500 mAh) battery	Full charge can last 70 days. Able to connect to three separate devices. Logitech Flow compatible	
MX Master 3s	2022	7	Free spinning (toggled by software - various methods available)	Darkfield Laser	200-8000	Bolt / Bluetooth 5.0	Rechargeable Li-Po (500 mAh) battery	Full charge can last 70 days. Able to connect to three separate devices. Logitech Flow compatible	
Lift (vertical mouse)	2022	5		Darkfield Laser					
MX Anywhere 3S	2023	6	Free spinning (toggled by mechanical switch or autoshift via software)	Darkfield Laser	200-8000	Bolt / Bluetooth 5.0	Rechargeable Li-Po (500 mAh) battery	Full charge can last 70 days. Able to connect to three separate devices. Logitech Flow compatible	
M240 SILENT	2023	3	Yes	Optical	1000	Bolt / Bluetooth 5.0	1x AA	Just like M220 but with Bluetooth	
PEBBLE MOUSE 2 M350S	2023	2	Yes	Optical	1000	Bolt / Bluetooth 5.0	1x AA	Now up to 3 devices can be added with Bluetooth	
Wireless Mouse M340 Collection	2024	3	Yes	Optical	1000	RF	1×AA	Budget mouse available in many designs	
M196 Bluetooth Mouse	2025	3	Yes	Optical	1000	Bluetooth	1x AA	Basic cheap budget mouse	
MX Master 4	2025	8	Free spinning (toggled by mechanical switch or autoshift via software)	Darkfield Laser	200-8000	Bolt / Bluetooth 5.1	Rechargeable Li-Po (650 mAh) battery	First MX mouse with customizable haptic feedback and the Actions Ring overlay. MagSpeed scroll, quiet clicks, and multi-device pairing. Compatible with Logi Options+ and Logitech Flow. Battery lasts up to 70 days.	

=== Gaming mice ===
Product title	Release year	Buttons	Scroll wheel	Sensor type	Sensor	Resolution (dpi)	Wireless	Batteries	Customizable weight(s)	Remarks	References	Weight
WingMan Gaming Mouse	1999	3	No	Opto-mechanical	—N/a	?	Wired	—N/a	No			
WingMan Force Feedback Mouse	1999	3	No	Opto-mechanical ?	—N/a	?	Wired	—N/a	No	Has force feedback; Also works as a joystick		
G1	2005	4	Yes	Optical	S2020	800	Wired	—N/a	No			
MX518	2005	8	Yes	Optical	A3080/A3080E	400-1600 (A3080) 400-1800 (A3080E)	Wired	—N/a	No	Replaced by G400 in 2011.		100g Approx
G3	2005	6	Yes	IR laser	S6006	?-2000	Wired	—N/a	No	Replaced by G300 in 2011.		
G5	2005 (2007 for black/blue edition)	8/9(SE)	Yes	IR laser	S6006	400-2000	Wired	—N/a	Eight 1.7g weights and eight 4.5g weights that could be inserted in groups of eight in a chosen arrangement to alter the balance of the mouse	Replaced by G500 in 2009.		
G7	2005	8	Yes	IR laser	S6006	400-2000	2.4 GHz	Li-Ion	No	Batteries were swappable and charged in a base station that also acted as an anchor for the receiver.		
G9	2007	7	Free spinning (mechanical switch toggled)	IR laser	A6090	3200	Wired	—N/a	Four 4g weights and four 7g weights that could be inserted in groups of eight in a chosen arrangement to alter the balance of the mouse	Replaced by G9x in 2008		
G9x	2008	7	Free spinning (mechanical switch toggled)	IR laser	S9500	200-5700	Wired	—N/a	Four 4g weights and four 7g weights that could be inserted in a group of four in a chosen arrangement to alter the balance of the mouse			
G500	2009	10	Free spinning (mechanical switch toggled)	IR laser	S9500	200-5700	Wired	—N/a	Six 1.7g weights and six 4.5g weights that could be inserted in groups of six in a chosen arrangement to alter the balance of the mouse	Replaced by the G500s in 2013		
G700	2010	13	Free spinning (mechanical switch toggled)	IR laser	S9500	200-5700 (software controlled)	2.4 GHz / may also connect via USB cable	1×AA NiMH (rechargeable); non-rechargeable AAs not supported	No	Replaced by the G700s in 2013		
G300/G300s	2011	9	Yes	Optical	A3055	200-2500	Wired	—N/a	No			
G400	2011	8	Yes	Optical	S3095	400-3600	Wired	—N/a	No	Replaced by the G400s in 2013		
G600	2012	20	Yes	IR laser	S9808	200-8200	Wired	—N/a	No	Color changing thumb buttons, on-board memory for 3 button mapping profiles, supports changes controlled by mouse buttons.		
G100s	2013	5	Yes	Optical	AM010	250-2500	Wired	—N/a	No	Replaced by the Pro in 2016		
G400s	2013	8	Yes	Optical	S3095	200-4000	Wired	—N/a	No	Replaced by the G402 Hyperion Fury in 2014		
G500s	2013	10	Free spinning (mechanical switch toggled)	IR laser	S9808	200-8200	Wired	—N/a	Eight 1.7g weights and eight 4.5g weights that could be inserted in groups of eight in a chosen arrangement to alter the balance of the mouse	Replaced by the G502 Proteus Core in 2014		
G602	2013	11	Yes	Optical	AM010	250-2500	2.4 GHz	2×AA (Can function with just one)	No	Features long battery life and two power modes: Performance and Endurance, with 250 hours of battery life and 1100 hours of battery life respectively. Replaced by G604 in 2019.		
G700s	2013	13	Free spinning (mechanical switch toggled)	IR laser	S9808	200-8200 (software controlled)	2.4 GHz / may also connect via USB cable	1×AA NiMH (rechargeable); non-rechargeable AAs not supported	No			
G90	2014	5	Yes	Optical	AM010	250-2500	Wired	—N/a	No	A less durable version of the G100s for Asian markets		110 g
G402 Hyperion Fury	2014	8	Yes	Hybrid optical and accelerometer	AM010	240-4000	Wired	—N/a	No	Combines optical sensor with an accelerometer, allowing the mouse to track speeds in excess of 500 inches per second, and more than 16G in acceleration.		108g (3.8 oz) (without cable) 144g (5.1 oz) (with cable)
G502 Proteus Core	2014	11	Free spinning (mechanical switch toggled)	IR optical	PMW3366	200-12000	Wired	—N/a	Five 3.6g weights that can be inserted in a chosen arrangement to alter the balance of the mouse			121g (4.3 oz) (without cable) 168g (5.9 oz) (with cable)
G302 Daedalus Prime	2014	6	Yes	Optical	AM010	240-4000	Wired	—N/a	No	A budget model of the famous G303 Daedalus Apex, with a lower performance sensor and no RGB.		87g (3 oz) (without cable) 122g (4 oz) (with cable)
G303 Daedalus Apex	2015	6	Yes	IR optical	PMW3366	200-12000	Wired	—N/a	No	Features fully customizable RGB lighting and the popular PMW3366 sensor along with additional feet to appeal to the FPS gaming market, as opposed to the G302 intended for the MOBA market.		87g (3 oz) (without cable) 122g (4 oz) (with cable)
G502 Proteus Spectrum	2016	11	Free spinning (mechanical switch toggled)	IR optical	PMW3366	200-12000	Wired	—N/a	Five 3.6g weights that can be inserted in a chosen arrangement to alter the balance of the mouse	Fully customizable RGB lighting, only change from the original G502 aside from the removal of cyan highlights from the body of the mouse.		121g (4.3 oz) (without cable) 168g (5.9 oz) (with cable)
G900 Chaos Spectrum	2016	11	Free spinning (mechanical switch toggled)	IR optical	PMW3366	200-12000	2.4 GHz / may also connect via USB cable	Rechargeable Li-Po (750mAh) battery	No	Fully customizable RGB lighting, features ambidextrous design with customizable thumb buttons. Features what is considered to be the best wireless technology on the market. Replaced by G903		110g (3.88 oz) (without cable)
G PRO	2016	6	Yes	IR optical	PMW3366	200-12000	Wired	—N/a	No	Fully customizable RGB lighting. Update to the popular G100s, which was used heavily in professional FPS leagues.		85g (3.0 oz) (without cable) 130g (4.5 oz) (with cable)
G403 Prodigy	2016	6	Yes	IR optical	PMW3366	200-12000	Wired	—N/a	Single 10g weight inserted at the rear of the mouse	Fully customizable RGB lighting.		87.3g (3.08 oz) (without cable) 135g (4.76 oz) (with cable)
G403 Prodigy Wireless	2016	6	Yes	IR optical	PMW3366	200-12000	2.4 GHz / may also connect via USB cable	Rechargeable Li-Po (750mAh) battery	Single 10g weight inserted at the rear of the mouse	Fully customizable RGB lighting. Features same wireless technology as the G900. Replaced by G703.		107.2g (3.78 oz) (without cable and weight)
G102 Prodigy/G203 Prodigy	2017	6	Yes	IR optical	Mercury	200-8000 (6000 at launch)	Wired	—N/a	No	Fully customizable RGB lighting. Part of new "Prodigy" line intended for new PC gamers, with all "Prodigy" products costing US$69.99, except this mouse, which costs $39.99. Uses a new sensor, exact model and details are withheld, only known as the "Mercury" sensor. Not based on the PWM3366 sensor from PixArt.		83 g (2.9 oz) (without cable)
G903 Lightspeed	2017	11	Free spinning (mechanical switch toggled)	IR optical	PMW3366	200-12000	2.4 GHz / may also connect via USB cable / capable of use with the PowerPlay wireless charging system	Rechargeable Li-Po (750mAh) battery	Single 10g weight inserted at the rear of the mouse, not usable when paired with PowerPlay	Fully customizable RGB lighting. Revision of the G900, capable of interfacing with the PowerPlay charging mouse pad, which acts as a wireless receiver and inductive charger.		110g (3.88 oz) (without cable)
G703 Lightspeed	2017	6	Yes	IR optical	PMW3366	200-12000	2.4 GHz / may also connect via USB cable / capable of use with the Powerplay wireless charging system	Rechargeable Li-Po (750mAh) battery	Single 10g weight inserted at the rear of the mouse, not usable when paired with PowerPlay	Fully customizable RGB lighting. Revision of the G403 Wireless, capable of interfacing with the PowerPlay charging mouse pad, which acts as a wireless receiver and inductive charger.		107.2g (3.78 oz) (without cable, without weight, with weight door)
G603 Lightspeed	2017	6	Yes	IR optical	Hero	200-12000	2.4 GHz / Bluetooth / can connect up to two devices, one per method	2xAA (Can use 1xAA to reduce weight), up to 500 hours rated life in high response time mode (continuous gaming), 18 months in low response time mode	No	A version of the G403/G703 that uses the Hero sensor, featuring low and high performance modes in which, respectively, one is optimized for long life and does so by reducing response time to 8ms, and the other is optimized for gaming performance and uses a 1ms response time at the cost of battery life. New "Hero" sensor is a completely new sensor developed by Logitech. The sensor is optimized for precision and power efficiency. The mouse has no customizable lighting to increase battery life.		88.9g (3.14 oz) (mouse only) 112.3g (3.96 oz) (with 1 AA battery) 135.7g (4.79 oz) (with 2 AA batteries)
G PRO Wireless	2018	6	Yes	IR optical	Hero	100-16000	2.4 GHz / may also connect via USB cable / capable of use with the PowerPlay wireless charging system	Rechargeable Li-Po (240mAh) battery	No	A wireless addition to Logitech's Pro Line of Products. While it is named very similarly to the Pro Gaming Mouse, It uses a different shape. Has fully customizable RGB lighting. Used by around 27% of professional gamers.		80g (2.8 oz)
G304/G305 Lightspeed	2018	6	Yes	IR optical	Hero	100-12000	2.4 GHz	1xAA, up to 250 hours rated life in high response time mode, 9 months in low response time mode	No	Marketed as G304 in Asia, G305 in other regions. 2020 update includes two different colors (Blue & Lilac)		65g (2.3 oz) (mouse only) 99g (3.42 oz) (with 1 AA battery)
G502 Hero	2018	11	Free spinning (mechanical switch toggled)	IR optical	Hero	100-25600	Wired	—N/a	Five 3.6g weights that can be inserted in a chosen arrangement to alter the balance of the mouse	Update to the G502 Proteus Spectrum with new Hero sensor and new braided cable		121g (4.3 oz) (without cable) 168g (5.9 oz) (with cable)
G PRO Hero	2018	6	Yes	IR optical	Hero	100-16000	Wired	—N/a	No	Update to the Pro Gaming Mouse with new Hero sensor and new rubber cable		83g (2.9 oz) (without cable) 130g (4.6 oz) (with cable)
MX518 Legendary	2018 (China) 2019 (world)	8	Yes	IR optical	Hero	100-16000	Wired	—N/a	No	Based on the design of the MX518 but with a refreshed appearance and Logitech's current internal hardware.		101g (3.6 oz) (without cable)
G903 HERO	2019	11	Free spinning (mechanical switch toggled)	IR optical	Hero	100-16000	2.4 GHz / may also connect via USB cable / capable of use with the Powerplay wireless charging system	Rechargeable Li-Po (750mAh) battery	Single 10g weight inserted at the rear of the mouse, not usable when paired with PowerPlay	Fully customizable RGB lighting. Revision of the G903: the only difference being the sensor, resulting in improved battery life up to 180 hours when RGB is off.		110g (3.88 oz) (without cable)
G403 HERO	2019	?	?	IR optical	Hero	100-25600	?	?	?	-		?
G502 Lightspeed	2019	11	Free spinning (mechanical switch toggled)	IR optical	Hero	100-25600	2.4 GHz / may also connect via USB cable / capable of use with the Powerplay wireless charging system	Rechargeable Li-Po (250mAh) battery	4x2g and 2x4g weights that can be inserted in a chosen arrangement to alter the balance of the mouse	Update to the G502 with Lightspeed wireless		114g (without weights)
G604 Lightspeed	2019	15	Free spinning (mechanical switch toggled)	IR optical	Hero	100-16000	2.4 GHz / Bluetooth / can connect up to two devices, one per method	1xAA, up to 240 hours rated life when using 2.4 GHz, 5.5 months on Bluetooth	No	Update to G602 with newer Hero sensor		135g (4.76 oz), with AA battery
G102 LIGHTSYNC/G203 LIGHTSYNC	2020	6	Yes	IR optical	"Gaming-grade"	200-8000	Wired	—N/a	No	Update of G102/203 Prodigy with a lower-quality sensor. Comes in 4 different colors.		85g (3.0 oz) (without cable)
G PRO X Superlight	2020	5	Yes	IR optical	Hero	100-25600	2.4 GHz / may also connect via USB cable / capable of use with the Powerplay wireless charging system	Rechargeable Li-Po (240mAh) battery	No	Update to G PRO Wireless with lighter weight design and omission of right side buttons and DPI button. Widely regarded as one of the best gaming mice from Logitech.		62g (2.12 oz)
G303 Shroud Edition	2021	6	Yes	IR optical	Hero	100-25600	2.4 GHz / may also connect via USB-C cable	Rechargeable Li-Po (500mAh) battery	No	Revision of G303 Daedalus line with slight adjustments to the shape, lower weight, removal of RGB & addition of wireless. Designed with input from Shroud.		75g (2.65 oz)
G502 X	2022	11	Free spinning (mechanical switch toggled)	IR optical	Hero	100-25600	Wired	—N/a	No	Refresh to G502 Hero		89g (3.14 oz)
G502 X Lightspeed	2022	11	Free spinning (mechanical switch toggled)	IR optical	Hero	100-25600	2.4 GHz / may also connect via USB cable / capable of use with the Powerplay wireless charging system	—N/a	No	Refresh to G502 Lightspeed Wireless with no RGB		99.7g (3.52 oz)(Black)- 101.5g (3.58 oz)(White)
G502 X Plus	2022	11	Free spinning (mechanical switch toggled)	IR optical	Hero	100-25600	2.4 GHz / may also connect via USB cable / capable of use with the Powerplay wireless charging system	—N/a	No	Refresh to G502 Lightspeed Wireless with RGB		106g (3.74 oz)
G705 Lightspeed	2022	6	Yes	IR optical	"Gaming-grade"	100-8200	2.4 GHz / may also connect via USB-C cable	—N/a	No	Part of the Aurora Collection		85g (3 oz)
G PRO X Superlight 2	2023	5	Yes	IR optical	Hero 2	100-32000 100-44000 (Cyan Limited Edition)	2.4 GHz / may also connect via USB cable / capable of use with the Powerplay wireless charging system	Rechargeable Li-Po (240mAh) battery	No	Update to the G PRO X SUPERLIGHT. Slightly lighter than its predecessor and the first mouse to include Logitech's new Hero 2 sensor.		60 g (2.12 oz)
G PRO 2 Lightspeed	2024	8	Yes	IR optical	Hero 2	100-32000	2.4 GHz / may also connect via USB cable / capable of use with the Powerplay wireless charging system	Rechargeable Li-Po (290mAh) battery	No	Successor to the G PRO Wireless with the Hero 2 sensor, LIGHTFORCE optical/mechanical switches, a larger battery, and improved receiver compatibility.		80g (2.82 oz)
G PRO X Superlight 2 DEX	2024	5	Yes	IR optical	Hero 2	100-32000	2.4 GHz / may also connect via USB cable / capable of use with the Powerplay wireless charging system	Rechargeable Li-Po battery	No	Designed with an asymmetrical form for right-handed users.		60g (2.12 oz)
G PRO X Superlight 2c	2025	5	Yes	IR optical	Hero 2	100-44000	2.4 GHz / may also connect via USB cable / capable of use with the Powerplay wireless charging system	Rechargeable Li-Po battery	No	Compact version of the standard G PRO X Superlight 2; roughly 7mm shorter and 2mm thinner, as well as lighter.		51g (1.79 oz)
G PRO X Superlight 2 SE	2025	5	Yes	IR optical	Hero 2	100-32000	2.4 GHz / may also connect via USB cable / capable of use with the Powerplay wireless charging system	Rechargeable Li-Po battery	No	Lower-cost variant of the G PRO X Superlight 2 with a slightly shorter battery life and a shorter receiver report rate.		60g (2.12 oz)
G304 X	2025									Superlight, with upgraded sensor.		
G PRO X2 Superstrike	2026	5	Yes	IR optical	Hero 2	100-44000	2.4 GHz / may also connect via USB cable / capable of use with the Powerplay wireless charging system	Rechargeable Li-Po battery	No	Introduces the HITS (Haptic Inductive Trigger System) switches for decreased click latency with adjustable actuation and reset points.		61g (2.15 oz)

=== Trackballs ===
Product title	Model no.	Part no.	Release year	Buttons	Scroll wheel	Ball control	Ball diameter (Note: The measured or manufacturer supplied ball diameters are given without parentheses. The unit converted ball diameters are given inside parentheses.)	Sensor type	Resolution (dpi) (Note: Resolution is the base Hardware resolution and not the software resolution achieved through an Acceleration Profile or Ballistics.)	Wireless	Batteries	Connector (Note: If multiple connectors are listed, the device is auto-sensing and the 1st connector is the native one while the other connectors need only a passive adapter to be used.)	Remarks	References
TrackMan Mouse (Serial)	T-CA1-9F	—N/a	1989	3	No	Thumb	?	Opto-mechanical (Note: Opto-mechanical sensing of the ball's movement uses optical encoders connected to rollers, that touch the ball.)	320	Wired	—N/a	DB-9F	Possible M/N: T-AK, T-AA1, T-SC1	
TrackMan Mouse (Bus)	T-PA1-9MD	—N/a	1989	3	No	Thumb	?	Opto-mechanical	320	Wired	—N/a	InPort Bus	ISA Adapter Card: P/N 200033-00B	
TrackMan Stationary Mouse	T-CC2-9F	—N/a	1991	3	No	Thumb	?	Opto-mechanical	?	Wired	—N/a	DB-9F, PS/2		
TrackMan Stationary Mouse	T-CD2-6F	—N/a	1993	3	No	Thumb	?	Opto-mechanical	?	Wired	—N/a	PS/2, DB-9F, DB-25F		
TrackMan Stationary Mouse (Macintosh)	T-AE2	—N/a	1993	3	No	Thumb	?	Opto-mechanical	?	Wired	—N/a	PS/2		
TrackMan Portable	T-CC3	—N/a	1991	3	No	Thumb	25mm, 1in	Opto-mechanical	200	Wired	—N/a	DB-9F, DB-25F, PS/2		
TrackMan Portable	T-CE3, T-SP3, T-SC3	—N/a	1993	3	No	Thumb	25mm, 1in	Opto-mechanical	200	Wired	—N/a	PS/2	Possible M/N: T-SH3	
First Track	T-MA CST2	804087-00	1994	2	No	Finger	?	Opto-mechanical	?	Wired	—N/a	DB-9F, DB-25F	A.k.a. First Trackball; Possible M/N: T-AC CST2	
TrackMan Live!	M-RD37	804125-00, 811203-00, 904324-0403	1994	3	No	Thumb	?	Opto-mechanical	400	RF 27 MHz	2×AAA	PS/2, DB-9F	A.k.a. SurfMan; Designed to work as a presenter	
TrackMan Voyager	T-CF9	804091-00, 904120-00	1994	3	No	Finger	?	Opto-mechanical	?	Wired	—N/a	PS/2		
TrackMan Vista	T-CG10	804180-00, 804108-1000, 904142-L100, 904142-L600	1994	3	No	Finger	?	Opto-mechanical	?	Wired	—N/a	PS/2		
TrackMan Marble	T-CH11, T-AH11	804122-3000, 804219-0000	1995	3	No	Thumb	34mm, 1.35in	Marble optical (Note: The Marble Optical Technology uses 1 or 2 red LEDs to shine on a dotted surface and an optical sensor to see the movements of the dots much like the photoreceptor cells of an eye do. It does not work on clear glass or mirrors. The applied Marble optical tech in a TrackMan has a guaranteed minimum resolution of 200 DPI and a maximum resolution of 300 DPI.)	300	Wired	—N/a	PS/2, DB-9F		
TrackMan Marble FX	T-CJ12, ST-71H	804251-0000 (gray plug), 804272-1000 (green plug)	1997	4	No	Finger	51mm, 2in (Note: The ball diameter of the TrackMan [Marble] Fx measures exactly 2 inches, which rounds to 51 mm. On Logitech's Japanese website the ball diameter is (was) listed as 50 mm.)	Marble optical	300	Wired	—N/a	PS/2, DB-9F		
TrackMan Marble+	T-CL13	804269-0000, 804269-1000	1998	3	Yes	Thumb	34mm, 1.35in	Marble optical	300	Wired	—N/a	PS/2, DB-9F	Same design as T-BB13	
TrackMan Marble Wheel	T-BB13	804335-0000, 904276-0403, 904334-0403	1999	3	Yes	Thumb	34mm, 1.35in	Marble optical	300	Wired	—N/a	USB, PS/2	Same design as T-CL13	
Marble Mouse	T-CM14, ST-41	804292-0000	1998	2	No	Finger	40mm, 1.58 in	Marble optical	300	Wired	—N/a	PS/2	Color: Beige	
Marble Mouse	T-BB14, TKM BOSSA, ST-43UPi, ST-44UPi	904360-0403	1999	2	No	Finger	40mm, 1.58 in	Marble optical	300	Wired	—N/a	USB, PS/2	Same as T-BC21; Colors w/Jap. M/N: ST-43UPi=Beige, ST-44UPi=Dark gray	
Cordless TrackMan FX	T-RA17, CT-74UPi	804364-0000, 904357-0909, 904357-0403	2000	4	No	Finger	51mm, 2in	Marble optical	300	RF 27 MHz	1×AA	USB, PS/2	Wireless Receiver: M/N C-BA4-MSE, P/N 830483-0000	
Cordless TrackMan Wheel	T-RA18, CT-64UPi	804359-0000, 904346-0403	2000	3	Yes	Thumb	34mm, 1.35in	Marble optical	300	RF 27 MHz	1×AA	USB	Color: Silver; Wireless Receiver: M/N C-BA4-MSE, P/N 830483-0000	
TrackMan Wheel	T-BB18, ST-64UPi, ST-65UPi, TM-250	810-000766, 804360-0000 (w/LEDs), 804360-1000, 904353-0215, 904353-0403	2001, 2002, 2008	3	Yes	Thumb	34mm, 1.35in	Marble optical	300	Wired	—N/a	USB, PS/2	Colors w/Jap. M/N: ST-64UPi/2001=Silver, ST-65UPi/2002=Light bronze, TM-250/2008=Dark gray	
TrackMan Marble (Mouse)	T-BC21, ST-45UPi, TM-150, TM-150r	810-000767, 910-000806, 910-000808, 910-000858, 910-003579	2002, 2008	4	No	Finger	40mm, 1.58 in	Marble optical	300	1.73m cable	—N/a	USB, PS/2	Same as T-BB14; Colors w/Jap. M/N: ST-45UPi/2002=Light gray, TM-150/2008=Dark gray; Jap. Package/Price Revisions: TM-150r/2013	
Cordless Optical TrackMan	T-RB22, TKM CALYPSO, CT-100, TM-400	810-000787, 810-000933, 904369-0403	2002, 2008	8	Yes	Finger	44mm, 1.75in	Marble optical	300	RF 27 MHz	2×AA	USB, PS/2	Colors w/Jap. M/N: CT-100/2002=Light gray, TM-400/2008=Dark gray; Wireless Receiver: M/N C-BA4-MSE, P/N 830406-0000	
Wireless Trackball M570	T-R0001, M570, M570t	910-001799, 910-001882, 910-002090, 910-003943	2010	5	Yes	Thumb	34mm, 1.35in	Laser	540 (Note: The Wireless Trackball M570 has a resolution of 540 DPI according to its Logitech Product page, but a resolution of 400 DPI according to its Logitech Support page.)	eQuad DJ Unifying 2.4 GHz	1×AA	USB	Color w/Jap. M/N: M570/2010=Black; Jap. Package/Price Revisions: M570t/2013; Wireless Receiver: P/N 993-000439	
MX ERGO Wireless Trackball	M-R0065	910-005177, 910-005178	2017	8	Yes	Thumb	34mm, 1.35in	Advanced optical tracking	320 – 440	Bluetooth, Unifying	Rechargeable Li-Po (500 mAh) battery	USB	Tilts 0° or 20°; P/N 910-005178=MX ERGO Plus (+10° wedge)	
ERGO M575 Wireless Trackball		910-005870, 910-005872, 910-006221, 910-006438	2021	5	Yes	Thumb		Advanced optical tracking	400	Bluetooth, Unifying, Bolt	1×AA	USB		
Product title	Model no	Part no.	Release year	Buttons	Scroll wheel	Ball control	Ball diameter	Sensor type	Resolution (dpi)	Wireless	Batteries	Connector	Remarks	References

=== Touchpads ===
Product title	Release year	Buttons	Multi-touch	Wireless	Batteries
Wireless Touchpad	2011	2	Yes	Unifying	2×AA
Wireless Rechargeable Touchpad T650	2012	1	Yes	Unifying	Li-ion rechargeable

=== Cordless presenters ===
Product title	Release year	Buttons	Screen	Laser pointer	Wireless	Batteries	Remarks	References
TrackMan Live!	1994	3	No	No	RF 27 MHz	2×AAA	A.k.a. SurfMan; also works as a trackball	
Cordless Presenter	2002	4	No	Yes	Bluetooth	2×AA	Also works as a mouse	
Cordless 2.4 GHz Presenter	2005	5	LCD	Yes	RF 2.4 GHz	2×AAA		
Wireless Presenter R400	2007	5	No	Yes	RF 2.4 GHz	2×AAA		
Wireless Presenter R700	2007	5	LCD	Yes	RF 2.4 GHz	2×AAA		
Wireless Presenter R800	2007	5	LCD	Yes	RF 2.4 GHz	2×AAA		
Logitech Spotlight R-R0011	2017	3	No	No	Bluetooth	Rechargeable lithium polymer, 85mAh	Touch sensitive field, also works as a mouse. Custom Logitech presentation software.	

=== 3D controllers ===
Product title	Release year	Buttons	Scroll wheel	Sensor type	Resolution	Wireless	Batteries	Remarks	References
3D Mouse & Head-Tracker	1992	5	No	Ultrasonic (23 kHz)	Angular: 0.1°, XYZ-Pos: 2D=400 DPI, 3D=0.004 inch	Yes	No	3D VR set	
Magellan (Note: Professional 6DoF device built by the Logitech subsidiary LogiCad3D. In 2001 Logitech bought Labtec and LogiCad3D was merged with Labtec's 3D Motion Control Technology Group (the former SIMC/STI of SpaceBall fame) to form 3Dconnexion. (See 3Dconnexion for 3D mice after 2001.))	1993	8 (Note: The ✱-button is a hardware only button used for calibration. As this button is not readable by the host computer, it does not count towards the device's button total. (Just as the wireless Connect-button does not count.))	No (Note: The device has no physical scroll wheel, but one (or two) of the axis can be mapped to act as a scroll wheel.)	Opto-mechanical	—N/a	No	—N/a	A.k.a. SpaceMouse (Classic)	
CyberMan	1994	3	No	Opto-mechanical	—N/a	No	—N/a	M/N E-AA1, P/N 871006-00	
CyberMan 2	1997	8	No	Opto-mechanical	—N/a	No	—N/a		
Magellan Plus	1998	10	No	Opto-mechanical	—N/a	No	—N/a	A.k.a. SpaceMouse Plus	
CyberPuck (Serial)	1999	0 (Note: The device has 5 QuickTip buttons. QuickTips are software detected taps of the puck; not true buttons.)	No	Opto-mechanical	—N/a	No	—N/a	A.k.a. PuckMan	
CyberPuck (USB)	2000	0	No	Opto-mechanical	—N/a	No	—N/a	A.k.a. PuckMan	
Magellan PlusXT	2000	10	No	Opto-mechanical	—N/a	No	—N/a	A.k.a. SpaceMouse PlusXT	

=== Other pointing devices ===
Product title	Release year	Buttons	Scroll wheel	Sensor type	Resolution (dpi)	Wireless	Batteries	Remarks	References
NuLOOQ navigator	2006	4	Navring	?	?	No	—N/a	Navring: pushing scrolls, turning zooms; touch sensitive Tooltuner dial on top	

== Keyboards ==
=== Gaming keyboards ===
Product title	Release year	Key switch type	Wireless	Batteries	Multimedia buttons	Macro buttons × macros per button	Total macros	Backlight	Remarks
G11	2005	Membrane rubber dome	Wired	—N/a	Yes	18x3	54	Blue	G15 without LCD. 2 USB ports (Type A).
G13 Advanced Gameboard	2008	Membrane rubber dome	Wired	—N/a	No	29×3	87	Yes	Has a multicolor LCD-display and mini-joystick
G15	2005	Membrane rubber dome	Wired	—N/a	Yes	18×3	54	Blue	Features a folding blue backlit 160×43 pixel monochrome LCD-display, "game mode" switch (which disables the "Windows" keys), and a 2-port USB 1.1 hub.
G15 (v2)	2007	Membrane rubber dome	Wired	—N/a	Yes	6×3	18	Orange	Features an orange backlit 160×43 pixel monochrome LCD-display, "game mode" switch (which disables the "Windows" keys), and a 2-port USB 1.1 hub.
G19	2009	Membrane rubber dome	Wired	—N/a	Yes	12×3	36	RGB	Has a 320×240 pixel color screen with 8 navigation buttons. Logitech's first RGB backlight.
G19s	2013	Membrane rubber dome	Wired	—N/a	Yes	12×3	36	RGB	Updated G19 with hydrophobic coating.
G103		Membrane rubber dome	Wired	—N/a	No	6	6	No	
G105	2011	Membrane rubber dome	Wired	—N/a	No	6×3	18	Blue	
G105: Made for Call of Duty		Membrane rubber dome	Wired	—N/a	No	6×3	18	Green	Has Call of Duty: Modern Warfare 3 branding and green backlighting.
G110	2009	Membrane rubber dome	Wired	—N/a	Yes	12×3	36	Red/blue	Successor of G11. Mix red and blue backlighting LEDs in varying intensities.
G510	2010	Membrane rubber dome	Wired	—N/a	Yes	18×3	54	RGB	Has a 160×43 pixel monochrome backlit screen with 5 navigation buttons.
G510s	2013	Membrane rubber dome	Wired	—N/a	Yes	18×3	54	RGB	Updated G510 with hydrophobic coating.
G710+	2013	Cherry MX Brown (with preinstalled O rings)	Wired	—N/a	Yes	6×3	18	White	Logitech's first mechanical key switch keyboard, featuring Cherry MX Brown switches with preinstalled O ring sound dampeners.
G710	2013	Cherry MX Blue	Wired	—N/a	Yes	6×3	18	White	An updated version of the G710+, now with Cherry MX Blue switch keys.
G910 "Orion Spark"	2014	Logitech Romer-G	Wired	—N/a	Yes	9×3	27	RGB per key	Logitech's first proprietary mechanical key switch keyboard, with custom Omron "Romer-G" switch keys and individual RGB backlight color per key.
G410 "Atlas Spectrum"	2015	Logitech Romer-G	Wired	—N/a	Controls are FN shortcuts assigned to F9–F12, Print Screen, Scroll Lock, and Pause keys	0×0	0	RGB per key	Uses the "Romer-G" switches found in the G910. Features a tenkeyless design.
G810 "Orion Spectrum"	2016	Logitech Romer-G	Wired	—N/a	Yes	12x3 (F keys can be assigned as macro keys.)	36	RGB per key	Uses the "Romer-G" switches found in the G910 and the G410. Keeps a minimalistic design for pure performance.
G610 "Orion"	2016	Cherry MX Brown, Red or Blue	Wired	—N/a	Yes	12x3 (F keys can be assigned as macro keys.)	36	White	Uses the standard Cherry MX switches found in most of the mechanical keyboards. Keeps a minimalistic design for pure performance.
G910 "Orion Spectrum"	2016	Logitech Romer-G	Wired	—N/a	Yes	9×3	27	RGB per key	Refresh of the G910 Orion Spark featuring the more conventional keycaps found on the G810 (rounded shape versus the faceted design found on the original G910) and a smaller, symmetrical wrist rest. Identical to the Orion Spark in all other ways.
G213 "Prodigy"	2016	Membrane rubber dome	Wired	—N/a	Yes	9×3	27	RGB in set zones	Part of new "Prodigy" line intended for new PC gamers, with all "Prodigy" products costing US$69.99, except the new G203 Mouse
Pro Mechanical Gaming Keyboard	2017	Logitech Romer-G Tactile	Wired, with detachable cable	—N/a	Controls are FN shortcuts assigned to F9-F12, Print Screen, Scroll Lock, and Pause keys	12x3 (F keys can be assigned as macro keys.)	36	Yes	Tenkeyless G810 with revisions to Romer-G switch
G413 Carbon and Silver	2017	Logitech Romer-G Tactile	Wired	—N/a	Controls are FN shortcuts assigned to F9-F12, Print Screen, Scroll Lock, and Pause keys	12x3 (F keys can be assigned as macro keys.)	36	Yes	Aluminum top construction in "carbon" and "silver" flavors. Cheapest keyboard to use Romer-G switches yet.
G613 Wireless Mechanical Gaming Keyboard	2017	Logitech Romer-G Tactile	Yes	2xAA, 18 months rated life	Yes	6	6	No	Among the first proper wireless mechanical keyboards, and the first one from a major, popular manufacturer. Romer-G switches are without RGB lighting to improve battery life Can connect up to two devices via 2.4 GHz wireless and Bluetooth, also compatible with iOS and Android devices as a keyboard input.
G513 Carbon Mechanical Gaming Keyboard	2018	Logitech Romer-G tactile or linear	Wired	—N/a	Controls are FN shortcuts assigned to F9-F12, Print Screen, Scroll Lock, and Pause keys	12x3 (F keys can be assigned as macro keys.)	36	RGB per key	Introduces new Romer-G linear switches as an alternative to the tactile version. Comes with 12 included extra key-caps with alternative shaping.
G815	2019	Logitech low profile keyboard GL- clicky tactile or lineal switches	Wired	--	Yes	5 extra G keys located on the left side and keyboard has a 3 profile	5x3	RGB per key	First Logitech low profile keyboard made of aluminum
G915 LIGHTSPEED TKL/FULL	2019	Logitech low profile wireless keyboard GL clicky tactile or lineal switches	Yes	30–36 hours at 100%. Up to 800 hours with RGB lighting completely off.	Yes	5 extra G keys located on the left side and keyboard has a 3 profile	5x3	RGB per key	First Logitech low profile wireless keyboard also made of aluminum
G413 SE TKL/FULL	2022	Logitech GX only tactile	Wired	--	No	doest support software	0	white	Just remake of G413 but cheaper
Logitech G PRO X TKL LIGHTSPEED	2023	Logitech GX clicly tactile or lineal	Yes	50 hours	Yes	12x3 (F keys can be assigned as macro keys.)	36	RGB per key	Remake of Logitech g pro keyboard including lightspeed and Bluetooth. Double-shoot PBT keycaps
G PRO X 60 LIGHTSPEED	2024	Logitech optical switches tactile or lineal	Yes	65 hours	FN and O, P, ^.	Full keyboard can be assigned as macro keys (without system keys).	Full keyboard without system keys	RGB per key	First Logitech 60% procent keyboards with optical switches and new technology "key kontrols" (its terrible keyboard (overprise)
G515 LIGHTSPEED	2024	GL- clicky tactile or lineal	Yes	36 hours	Controls are FN shortcuts assigned to F9-F12, Print Screen, Scroll Lock, and Pause keys	Full keyboard can be assigned as macro keys (without system keys).	Full keyboard without system keys	RGB per key	Just a low profile keyboard but smaller than g915
G PRO X RAPID	2024	Magnetic switches	No	—N/a	Yes	Full keyboard can be assigned as macro keys (without system keys).	Full keyboard without system keys	RGB per key	Like a rework of g pro x tkl, but is the first Logitech magnetic keyboard and also supports rapid trigger.
G515 RAPID	2025	Magnetic low profile switches	No	—N/a	Controls are FN shortcuts assigned to F9-F12, Print Screen, Scroll Lock, and Pause keys	Full keyboard can be assigned as macro keys (without system keys).	Full keyboard without system keys	RGB per key	First Logitech low profile magnetic keyboard rework of g515

=== Full-sized keyboards (office keyboard) ===
Product title	Release year	Type	Key type	Wireless	Batteries	Multimedia buttons	USB hub	Backlight	Remarks
Deluxe Access Keyboard	2001	Membrane	normal	Wired	—N/a	Yes	No	No	
Elite Keyboard	2002	Membrane	normal	Wired	—N/a	Yes	No	No	Has scroll wheel
Internet Navigator Keyboard	2002	Membrane	normal	Wired	—N/a	Yes	No	No	Has scroll wheel
Access Keyboard	2002	Membrane	normal	Wired	—N/a	Yes	No	No	
Cordless Access Keyboard	2004	Membrane	normal	RF	?	Yes	No	No	
Media Keyboard	2004	Membrane	normal	Wired	—N/a	Yes	No	No	
Media Keyboard Elite	2005	Membrane	normal	Wired	—N/a	Yes	No	No	
Alto	2007	Membrane	normal	Wired	—N/a	Yes	Yes	No	Has built-in notebook stand
Wave Keyboard	2007	Membrane	ergonomic	Wired	—N/a	Yes	No	No	Ergonomically designed "wave" key arrangement
Wireless Solar Keyboard K750	2010	Membrane	normal	Unifying	Yes	Yes	No	No	Solar powered with rechargeable ML2032, on/off switch
Logitech K300 Compact Keyboard	2010	Membrane	normal	Wired	No	Yes	No	Yes	Stylish backlit media controls, space saving design, full size number pad.
Logitech Washable Keyboard K310	2012	Membrane	normal	Wired	No	Yes	No	No	Small washing brush included in the package
Logitech Craft Advanced Wireless Keyboard	2017	Membrane	normal	Unifying	Yes	Yes	No	Yes	Input dial, USB-C rechargeable, on/off switch
Wireless Illuminated Keyboard K800	2010	Membrane	normal	Unifying	Yes	Yes	No	Yes	
Mechanical K840	2017	Romer-G Mechanical	normal	Wired	No	Yes	No	No	Succeeded by the K845.
MX Keys	2019	Membrane	normal	Unifying, Bluetooth	Yes	Yes	No	Yes	Offered in a Mini variation without a number pad.
Mechanical K845	2020	Cherry MX/ TTC mechanical	normal	Wired	No	Yes	No	No	Refresh to the K840, with Cherry MX and TTC switches replacing the Romer-G switches seen in the K840.
MX Keys Mini	2021	Membrane	normal	Bluetooth	Yes	Yes	No	Yes	Tenkeyless (no number pad); Easy-Switch (3 devices); USB-C rechargeable with smart illumination; consumer variant pairs via Bluetooth (Logi Bolt compatible, receiver not included).
MX Keys for Business	2021	Membrane	normal	Bolt, Bluetooth	Yes	Yes	No	Yes	Offered in a Mini variation without a number pad.
MX Keys /MINI Mechanical	2022	Mechanical	normal	Bolt, Bluetooth	Yes	Yes	No	Yes	Offered in a Mini variation without a number pad and with either linear, tactile, or clicky Kailh keyboard switches.
MX Keys S	2023	Membrane	normal	Bolt, Bluetooth	Yes	Yes	No	Yes	Successor to MX Keys; smart illumination, Logi Options+ customization, and updated Fn keys (emoji, dictation, mic mute).

=== Mobile keyboards ===
Product title	Release year	Type	Key type	Wireless	Batteries	Multimedia buttons	USB hub	Backlight	Remarks
KeyCase	2002	ElekTex Fabric	fabric	No	—N/a	Yes	No	No	Foldable Fabric keyboard for Palm OS devices
Typeaway	2002	Membrane	scissor	No	—N/a	Yes	No	No	Foldable Aluminum keyboard for Palm OS devices

=== Numeric pads ===
Product title	Release year	Type	Key type	Wireless	Batteries	Extra buttons	USB hub	Backlight	Remarks
Wireless Number Pad N305	2007	Membrane	normal	RF 2.4 Ghz	2×AA	Yes	No	No	
Wireless Number Pad N305 v2		Membrane	normal	Unifying	2×AA	Yes	No	No	Unifying receiver v1

== Game controllers ==
=== Gamepads ===
Product title	Release year	System	Connection	Batteries	Input	Vibration Feedback	Remarks	References	Image
Precision Gamepad 2		PC	No	—N/a	6 × digital buttons; Digital d-pad	No			
Thunderpad Digital		PC	No	—N/a	8 × digital buttons (A, B, C, D, L, R, ‧, ‧‧); d-pad	No			
Thunderpad Controller for Xbox	2003	Xbox	3m cable	—N/a	2 x analog sticks; 2 × pressure sensitive triggers (LT, RT); 6 × pressure sensitive buttons (A, B, X, Y, W, B); 2 × sigital buttons (Start, Back); Digital d-pad	Yes	Turbo buttons (T-On, T-Off); Officially licensed by Microsoft		
WingMan Precision USB	c.2003	PC	No	—N/a	6 × digital buttons (A, B, C, D, L, R, ‧, ‧‧); Digital d-pad	No			
WingMan RumblePad	c.2003	PC	No	—N/a	2 x Analog sticks; 9 × digital buttons; Digital d-pad; Slide throttle controller	Yes	A.k.a. Logitech RumblePad		
WingMan Cordless RumblePad		PC	RF 2.4 GHz	4×AA	2 x analog sticks; 11 × digital buttons; Digital d-pad; Slide throttle controller	Yes			
WingMan Action Pad	2004 or earlier	PC	No	—N/a	1 x analog sticks; 9 × digital buttons; Digital d-pad; Slide throttle controller	No			
Dual Action Gamepad		PC	No	—N/a	2 x analog sticks; 12 × digital buttons; D-pad	No			
Rumblepad 2	c.2005	PC	No	—N/a	2 x analog sticks; 10 × digital buttons; Digital d-pad	Yes	"Mode" button for swapping d-pad and left analogue stick functionality; "Vibration" button for enabling/disabling vibrations; Only supports DirectInput		
Cordless Rumblepad 2		PC	RF	2×AA	2 x analog sticks; 10 × digital buttons; Digital d-pad	Yes			
Action Controller	c.2004	PS2, PS1	No	—N/a	2 × analog sticks; 10 × pressure sensitive buttons (L1, R1, L2, R2, Start, Select); 3 × digital buttons ("Analog", L3, R3); Pressure sensitive d-pad	Yes (toggleable)	Officially licensed by Sony		
Cordless Action Controller	c.2004	PS2, PS1	RF 2.4 GHz	2×AA	2 × analog sticks; 10 × pressure sensitive buttons (L1, R1, L2, R2, Start, Select); 3 × digital buttons ("Analog", L3, R3); Pressure sensitive d-pad	Yes (toggleable)	Officially licensed by Sony		
Extreme Action Controller	c.2004	PS2, PS1	2.9m cable	—N/a	2 × analog sticks; 10 × pressure sensitive buttons (L1, R1, L2, R2, Start, Select); 3 × digital buttons ("Analog", L3, R3); Pressure sensitive d-pad	Yes (toggleable)	Has leather grips and gold-plated connector pins		
NetPlay Controller	c.2004	PS2	2.5m cable	—N/a	2 × analog sticks; 10 × pressure sensitive buttons (L1, R1, L2, R2, Start, Select); 3 × digital buttons ("Analog", L3, R3); Pressure sensitive d-pad; Detachable keyboard	Yes			
Gamepad F310	Late 2010	PC	1.8m cable	—N/a	2 × analog sticks; 2 × analog trigger buttons (LT, RT); 11 × digital buttons (A, B, X, Y, LB, RB, left stick "click", right stick "click", Start, Back, Logitech); Digital d-pad	No	Hardware switch for alternating between DirectInput and XInput (central "Logitech" button unavailable in DirectInput mode); "Mode" button for swapping d-pad and left analogue stick functionality		
Rumble Gamepad F510	Late 2010	PC	1.8m cable	—N/a	2 × analog sticks; 2 × analog trigger buttons (LT, RT); 11 × digital buttons (A, B, X, Y, LB, RB, left stick "click", right stick "click", Start, Back, Logitech); Digital d-pad	Yes (toggleable)	Hardware switch for alternating between DirectInput and XInput (central "Logitech" button unavailable in DirectInput mode); "Mode" button for swapping d-pad and left analogue stick functionality		
Wireless Gamepad F710	Late 2010	PC	RF 2.4 GHz (USB nano-receiver)	2×AA	2 × analog sticks; 2 × analog trigger buttons (LT, RT); 11 × digital buttons (A, B, X, Y, LB, RB, left stick "click", right stick "click", Start, Back, Logitech); Digital d-pad	Yes (toggleable)	Hardware switch for alternating between DirectInput and XInput (central "Logitech" button unavailable in DirectInput mode); "Mode" button for swapping d-pad and left analogue stick functionality; A modified version of the controller was used on OceanGate, Inc.'s Titan submersible, best known for imploding during an expedition to visit the wreck of the Titanic.		

=== Joysticks ===
Product title	Release year	System	Wireless	Batteries	Inputs	Vibration feedback	Remarks	References
WingMan	1996	PC	No	—N/a	2-axis joystick, 1 button, trigger, throttle	No	15-pin Game Port (analogue)	
WingMan Extreme	1996	PC	No	—N/a	2-axis joystick, 4-way hat	No	15-pin Game Port (analogue); Adds 4-way view switch	
WingMan Warrior	1997	PC	No	—N/a	2-axis joystick, 3 buttons, 4-way hat, trigger, throttle, 360 degree rotational knob	No	15-pin Game Port (digital); Adds independent control for left hand	
Wingman Extreme Digital	1997	PC	No	—N/a	2-axis joystick, 5 buttons, 8-way hat, trigger, throttle	No	15-pin Game Port (digital)	
WingMan Attack	1998?	PC	No	—N/a	2-axis joystick, 4 buttons, throttle	No	15-pin Game Port (analogue)	
Wingman Force	1998	PC	No	—N/a	2-axis joystick, 9 buttons, 8-way hat, trigger, throttle	Yes	USB; 2 motors control x and y axis resistance, up to 1 pound	
Wingman Interceptor	1999?	PC	No	—N/a	2-axis joystick, 9 buttons, 3 8-way hats, throttle	No	15-pin Game Port (digital); Doesn't require calibration	
WingMan Extreme Digital 3D	2000	PC	No	—N/a	3-axis joystick, 7 buttons; 8-way hat, throttle	No	15-pin Game Port (digital); Adds twist handle (3rd axis)	
WingMan Force 3D	2000	PC	No	—N/a	3-axis joystick, 7 buttons, 8-way hat, throttle	Yes	USB; Adds vibration feedback	
WingMan Attack 2	2001	PC, Mac	No	—N/a	2-axis joystick, 6 buttons, trigger, throttle	No	USB	
Attack 3	2002	PC	No	—N/a	2-axis joystick, 11 buttons, trigger, throttle	No	USB	
Extreme 3D Pro	2003	PC	No	—N/a	3-axis joystick, 12 buttons (one in trigger position), 4-way hat, throttle	No	Buttons 1-6 are located on stick with 2-5 being accessible to thumb in normal holding position, throttle slider is easily held by the thumb when fingers of left hand are placed over buttons 7-12	
Freedom 2.4 Cordless	2002	PC	RF 2.4 GHz	3×AA	joystick, 10 buttons, 8-way hat, throttle	No		

=== Racing wheels ===
Product title	Release year	System	Wireless	Batteries	Inputs	Force feedback	Remarks
Formula Force Feedback Wheel	2000	PC (USB)	No	—N/a	Steering wheel, ?	Yes	Red or yellow wheel
Formula GP		PC	No	—N/a	Steering wheel, gas & brake pedals	No	Yellow wheel
Formula Force GP		PC	No	—N/a	Steering wheel, gas & brake pedals	Yes	Red wheel
MOMO Racing Force Feedback Wheel	2002	PC	No	—N/a	Steering wheel, gas & brake pedals, shifter	Yes	
Speed Force		GameCube	No ?	—N/a	Steering wheel, ?	Unknown	
Speed Force Force Feedback Wheel	2002	GameCube	No	—N/a	Steering wheel, ?	Yes	
Speed Force Wireless	2008	Wii	Yes	—N/a	Steering wheel, ?	Yes	
NASCAR Racing Wheel		PC	No ?	—N/a	Steering wheel, ?	Yes	
Driving Force	2001	PC, PS2	No	No	Steering wheel, gas & brake pedals	Yes	Blue wheel
Driving Force EX		PC, PS2	No	—N/a	Steering wheel, gas & brake pedals	Unknown	
Driving Force Pro	2004	PS2	No	—N/a	Steering wheel, ?	Yes	900 degrees of rotation
Driving Force GT	2007	PC, PS2, PS3	No ?	—N/a	Steering wheel, ?	Yes	
Driving Force Wireless		PS3	Yes	—N/a	Steering wheel, ?	Yes	
G25	2006	PC, PS2, PS3	No	—N/a	Steering wheel, ?	Yes	
G27	2010	PC, PS2, PS3	No	—N/a	Steering wheel, ?	Yes	
G29	2015	PC, PS3, PS4, PS5	No	—N/a	Steering wheel, ?	Yes	
G920	2015	PC, Xbox One, Xbox Series X and Series S	No	—N/a	Steering wheel, ?	Yes	
G923	2020	PC, Xbox One, Xbox Series X and Series S, PS4, PS5	No	—N/a	Steering wheel, ?	Yes	
G PRO Racing Wheel	2024	PC, Xbox One, Xbox Series X and Series S, PS4, PS5	No	—N/a	Steering wheel, ?	Yes	
RS50	2025	PC, Xbox One, Xbox Series X and Series S, PS4, PS5	No	—N/a	Steering wheel, ?	Yes	

== Webcams and cameras ==
=== Webcams ===
Product title	Year	Type	Video resolution	Video framerate	Still resolution	Focus	Zoom	Built-in mic	Remarks
QuickCam for Notebooks	2002	Portable	352x288	30	640x480	fixed	No	No	Logitech's first Notebook webcam
QuickCam Pro 4000	2002	Stationary	640x480	30	1.3MP	fixed	software	Yes	
QuickCam Zoom	2002	Stationary	640x480	30	640x480	fixed	software	Yes	
QuickCam Pro 4000	2002	Stationary	640x480	30	1.3MP	fixed	software	Yes	
QuickCam Messenger		Stationary	640x480	30	VGA	fixed	No	Yes	
QuickCam Orbit		Stationary	640x480	30	1.3MP	fixed	software	Yes	Mechanical Pan / Tilt
QuickCam For Notebooks Pro		Portable	640x480	30	1.3MP	fixed	software	Yes	
QuickCam Cordless		Portable	640x480	30	VGA	fixed	No	Yes	2.4 GHz Wireless
QuickCam Communicate	2004	Stationary	640x480	30	VGA	fixed	No	Yes	
QuickCam Deluxe for Notebooks	2007	Portable	640x480	30	1.3MP	fixed	No	Yes	Glass optics
QuickCam for Notebooks	2007	Portable	640x480	30	1.3MP	fixed	No	Yes	
QuickCam Pro 9000	2007	Stationary	1280x720	30	2MP (8MP using software interpolation)	Auto	No	Yes	Zeiss glass optics. Manual focus available using QuickCam software.
QuickCam Pro for Notebooks	2007	Portable	1600x1200(@5fps)	30(@800x600)	2MP	Auto	No	Yes	Motorized vertical tilt, Zeiss glass optics
HD Pro Webcam C920	2012	Stationary	1920x1080(@30fps)	30(@1920x1080)	3MP	Auto	Yes 1.2x digital zoom	Yes Stereo	
C922 Pro Stream Webcam	2016	Stationary	1920x1080(@30fps)	60(@1280×720)	3MP	Auto	Yes 1.2x digital zoom	Yes Stereo	
BRIO 4K Pro Webcam	2017	Stationary	4096x2160(@30fps)	90(@1280×720)	13MP	Auto	Yes 5x digital zoom	Yes Stereo	
MX Brio/MX Brio 705 for Business	2024	Stationary	3840x2160(@30fps)	60(@1920x1080)	8.5MP Sony STARVIS	Auto	Yes 4x digital zoom	Yes Stereo	

=== Digital cameras ===
Product title	Year	Resolution	Video	Flash	Storage	Focus	Zoom	Remarks
FotoMan Digital Camera	1991		No					gray scale
FotoMan Plus Digital Camera	1993		No	Yes				gray scale
Pocket Digital Camera	2002	VGA	No	No	16MB	fixed	No	
Pocket Digital Camera 130	2003	1.3MP	No	Yes	16MB	fixed	No	
ClickSmart 820		2.1MP	VGA	Yes	8MB	fixed	No	Also works as Webcam
ClickSmart 510		1.3MP	320x240	Yes	Card only	fixed	No	Also works as Webcam
ClickSmart 420		1.3MP	320x240	Yes	8MB	fixed	No	Also works as Webcam
ClickSmart 310		352x288	176x144	No	2MB	fixed	No	Also works as Webcam

== Audio products ==
=== PC speakers ===
Product title	Year	Setup	Output (RMS)	Wireless	Batteries	Inputs	Outputs	Remarks
Z3	2003	2.1	23W+8.5Wx2	No	—N/a	Analog line-in		Has control pod for adjusting volume, power on/off and a plug for headphones. Subwoofer volume knob is in the back of subwoofer (Still active when turned all the way down)
Z-560	2001	4.1	53Wx4 + 188Wx1	No	—N/a	Analog line-in		Uses a hard wired controller with limited control options and level adjustments
Z-680	2002	5.1	62Wx4 + 69Wx1 + 188Wx1	No	—N/a	Analog line-in, SPDIF, COAX		
Z-640	2002	5.1	7.3Wx4 + 16.3Wx1 + 25.7Wx1	No	—N/a	Analog line-in		
X-620	2004	6.1	70w	No	—N/a	Analog line-in		
X-540	2006	5.1	7.4Wx4 + 15.4Wx1 + 25Wx1	No	—N/a	Analog line-in		Has control pod for adjusting volume, power on/off, bass level, matrix on/off and a plug for headphones
X-240	2007	2.1	5Wx2 + 15Wx1	No	—N/a	Analog line-in		Includes an iPod stand.
x-140	2006	2	2.5x2	No	—N/a	Analog line-in, headphone		
AudioHub	2007	2.1	3Wx2 + 9Wx1	No	—N/a	USB	USBx3 (Hub)	The two side speakers can slide out to accommodate different laptop sizes.
G51	2007	5.1	20Wx5 + 55Wx1	No	—N/a	Analog line-in		Has a remote control pod for adjusting levels
Z5400	2005	5.1	38Wx4 + 42Wx1 + 116Wx1	No	—N/a	Analog line-in, SPDIFx2, COAX		Has a remote control pod for adjusting levels, Analog line-in can be set to 3x stereo or 1x 5.1
Z5450	2005	5.1	38Wx4 + 42Wx1 + 116Wx1	Yes	No	Analog line-in, SPDIFx2, COAX		Has Wireless rear speakers + a remote control pod for adjusting levels, Analog ine-in can be set to 3x stereo or 1x 5.1
Z2300	2005	2.1	40Wx2 + 120Wx1	No	—N/a	Analog line-in		
Z5500	2005	5.1	62Wx4 + 69Wx1 + 188Wx1	No	—N/a	Analog line-in, SPDIF, COAX		Has a remote control pod for adjusting levels
Z Cinéma	2008	2.1	35Wx2 + 110Wx1	No	—N/a	Analog Line-in, USB	Headphone out	Has a built-in sound card, speakers are compatible with Windows Media Center, remote can be used to control volume, audio settings, such as bass, treble and surround, and Windows Media Center menu
Z320	2009	2.0	5Wx2	No	—N/a	Analog Line-in	Headphone out	Single off/on/vol control on one pod
Z323	2009	2.1	6Wx2 + 18W	No	—N/a	Analog Line-in x2, RCA	Headphone out	Single off/on/vol control on one pod
Z506	2010	5.1	75w	No	—N/a	Analog line-in		
Z906	2011	5.1	67Wx5 + 165Wx1	No	—N/a	Analog line-in, aux, RCA, SPDIFx2, COAX		Has a remote control pod for adjusting levels, inputs are on the subwoofer not the pod like with the z5500/z5400
Z623	2010	2.1	35Wx2 + 130Wx1	No	—N/a	Analog line-in		Controls for turning the speakers on/off, adjusting volume and bass are located on the right satellite speaker which also accommodates a headphone out and 3.5mm input jack.
Z120	2011	2.1	1.2W	No	—N/a	Analog line-in		Controls for turning the speakers on/off and adjusting volume on the right speaker
Z-5300	2003	5.1	Subwoofer: 100w; Satellites: 180w; 2 x 35.25w Front; 2 x 35.25w Rear; 39w Center	No	—N/a	Analog line-in		The Soundtouch wired remote control includes an on/off button, headphone jack, and a knob to adjust system volume, subwoofer volume, fader, and center. The Matrix Surround Sound feature creates surround sound from stereo sound content. The total peak power is 560 Watts and the frequency response ranges from 35 Hz to 20 kHz.

=== Headphones ===
Product title	Year	Output	Wireless	Batteries	Inputs	Microphone	Line controls	Remarks
ClearChat Pro	2007		No	—N/a	USB	Yes	Yes	Has volume, muting and preset equalizer buttons on the side of the earcup.
ClearChat Comfort	2007		No	—N/a	USB	Yes	Yes	Has volume and muting controls on the line.
H800	2011		Yes	Rechargeable 265mAh Li-Po	USB	Yes	Yes	USB-A receiver + Bluetooth wireless. Line Controls. Micro-USB charge port. Has volume, microphone mute, mode select, play/pause, and track switch on right earcup.

=== Gaming headphones ===
Product title	Year	Output	Surround features	Wireless	Batteries	Inputs	Microphone	Line controls	Remarks
G230 Stereo Gaming Headset	2013	Stereo	—N/a	No	—N/a	Analog line-in	Yes	Yes	Has volume and muting controls on the line.
G430 Surround Gaming Headset	2013	7.1	Dolby or DTS:X	No	—N/a	USB and Analog	Yes	Yes	Has volume and muting controls on the line.
G432 Surround Gaming Headset	2019	7.1	DTS:X 2.0 Only*	No	—N/a	USB and Analog	Yes	Yes	Has volume on the back of the left earcup. Mic up to mute.
G35 Surround Gaming Headset	2009	7.1	Dolby Only	No	—N/a	USB	Yes	Yes	Has volume, muting and user-programmable G-keys on the side of the earcup.
G930 Wireless Gaming Headset	2011	7.1	Dolby Only	Yes	Rechargeable 600mAh Li-Ion	USB	Yes	Yes	Has volume, muting and user-programmable G-keys on the side of the earcup.
G633 "Artemis Spectrum"	2015	7.1	Dolby or DTS:X	No	—N/a	USB and Analog	Yes	Yes	Has volume, muting, input switching and user-programmable G-keys on the back edge of the earcup. Full RGB lighting on edge of earcup and behind cover of earcup.
G933 "Artemis Spectrum"	2015	7.1	Dolby or DTS:X	Yes	Rechargeable 1100mAh Li-Po	USB	Yes	Yes	Has volume, muting, input switching and user-programmable G-keys on the back edge of the earcup. Full RGB lighting on edge of earcup and behind cover of earcup.
G231 "Prodigy"	2016	Stereo	—N/a	No	—N/a	Analog line-in	Yes	Yes	Has volume and muting controls on the line. Part of new "Prodigy" line intended for new PC gamers, with all "Prodigy" products costing US$69.99, except the new G203 Mouse
G533 Wireless Gaming Headset	2017	7.1	DTS:X Only*	Yes	Rechargeable 1100mAh Li-Po	USB	Yes	Yes	Has volume, muting, and a single programmable function key on the back of the left earcup. Recharges via USB.
Pro Headset	2018	Stereo	—N/a	No	—N/a	Analog line-in	Yes	Yes	Has volume and muting controls on the line.
G332 Gaming Headset	2019	Stereo	?	No	—N/a	Analog 3.5mm	Yes	No	
G935 Lightsync Gaming Headset	2019	7.1	DTS:X 2.0 Only*	Yes	Rechargeable 1100mAh Li-Po	USB	Yes	Yes	Has volume, muting, and three programmable function keys on the back of the left earcup. Recharges via USB.
G635 Lightsync Gaming Headset	2019	7.1	DTS:X 2.0 Only*	No	—N/a	USB and Analog	Yes	Yes	Has volume, muting, and three programmable function keys on the back of the left earcup.
G433 Surround Gaming Headset	2017	7.1	DTS:X Only*	No	—N/a	USB and Analog	Yes	Yes	Detachable Mic boom. Comes with two cables. Mobile cable with in-line volume and mic. PC Cable with in-line volume and mute.
G Pro X Wireless	2020	7.1	DTS:X 2.0 Only*	Yes	—N/a	—N/a	Yes	—N/a	—N/a

*DTS:X Only Headphones can utilize Windows Sonic for Headphones or Dolby Atmos for Headphones when using the generic "USB Audio Device" drivers.

=== Speaker docks ===
Product title	Year	Compatibility	Drivers	Batteries	Remote	Radio
Pure-Fi Dream	2007	iPod/iPhone	0.75" Tweeter, 3" Woofer	No	Yes	Yes
Pure-Fi Anywhere	2007	iPod/iPhone	2" Mid, 3" Woofer	Rechargeable	Yes	Yes

=== Sound cards ===
Product title	Year	Technology	Compatibility
AudioMan	1992	16-bit, Wave Table	SB, AdLib
SoundMan 16		16-bit	SB, AdLib
SoundMan Game	1993	16-bit	SB, SBPro, AdLib
SoundMan Wave	1994	16-bit, Wave Table	SB, AdLib

== Remotes ==
Product name	Release year	RF	Touch screen	Color display	Accessory	Model number
Harmony Ultimate	2013	Yes	Yes	Yes	Included	N-R0007
Harmony Smart Control	2013	Yes	No	No	Included	N-R0005
Harmony Touch	2013	Yes	Yes	Yes	No	N-R0006
Harmony One Advanced Universal Remote	2008	No	Yes	Yes	No	R-IY17
Harmony 650	2010	No	No	Yes	No	N-I0003
Harmony 900	2009	Yes	Yes	Yes	No	N-R0001
Harmony 1100 Advanced	2012				No	N-R0002, N-R0003
Harmony 700 Advanced					No	N-I0003
Harmony 659					No	H659BLK
Harmony 600					No	N-I0003
Harmony 200					No	N-I0004, N-I0005
Harmony 890 Advanced		Yes	No	Yes	No	R-RG7
Harmony 880 Advanced					No	R-IG7
Harmony 1000 Advanced					No	R-RJ13
Harmony Link					Yes	O-R0003
Harmony 520 Advanced					No	R-IH10
Harmony 550 Advanced					No	R-IP10
Harmony 510 Advanced					No	R-IH10
Harmony 720 Advanced					No	R-IQ12, R-IR12
Harmony Link App					Yes	N/A
Harmony 890 Pro Advanced					No	R-RG7
Harmony 676 Advanced					No	H676
Harmony 670 Advanced	2006				No	—
Harmony 680 Advanced					No	—
Harmony 628 Advanced					No	—
Harmony 768 Advanced					No	—
Harmony 688 Advanced					No	H688BLK, H688SIL
Harmony 300					No	N-I0004
Harmony 610 Advanced					No	N-I0002
Harmony 620 Advanced					No	—
Harmony RF System					Yes	O-R0002
Harmony IR Extender					Yes	O-I0001
Harmony Adapter for PlayStation 3					Yes	E-R0001
Harmony RF Wireless Extender					Yes	C-RE4A
Harmony 525 Advanced					No	—
Harmony 880 Pro					No	R-IG7
Harmony Advanced Universal Remote for Xbox 360					No	R-IK10

== Keyboard and mice combos ==
Name	Release year	Contents	References	Image
MouseMan Sensa	1991			
Cordless Desktop Pro Keyboard and Wheel Mouse	1999	1x Logitech Y-RB7 Cordless Ergonomic Keyboard 1x Logitech M-RG53 Cordless Mouseman Wheel Mouse 1x Logitech C-RD3-DUAL Cordless Desktop RF PS/2 Receiver		
Premium Desktop Optical Cordless Elite Duo	2002			
Cordless Navigator Duo	2002			
Cordless Access Duo	2002			
Cordless Access Duo Optical Cordless Comfort Duo	2002			
Cordless Desktop Pro or Cordless Comfort Duo Keyboard (M/N: Y-RJ7)				
diNovo Media Desktop	2003	1x Logitech diNovo Keyboard 1x Logitech MediaPad Number Pad 1x Logitech MX900 Optical Mouse 1x Logitech Charging dock for MX900		
Cordless Desktop MX for Bluetooth				
Cordless MX Duo				
Cordless Desktop Express				
Cordless Desktop LX700		1x Cordless Keyboard Y-RR54 1x Cordless Click! Plus Optical Mouse M-RAK89B 1x Cordless Desktop Receiver C-BO33		
Cordless Desktop LX500				
Cordless Desktop LX501				
Cordless Desktop LX300				
diNovo Cordless Desktop				
Cordless Desktop EX100				
Cordless Desktop MX5000				
diNovo Media Desktop Laser				
Cordless Desktop MX3100				
Cordless Desktop MX3000 Laser				
Cordless Desktop S510 Media Remote				
Cordless Desktop S510				
Cordless Desktop EX110				
Cordless Desktop MX3200 Laser				
Cordless Desktop Comfort Laser				
Cordless Desktop M530 Laser				
Cordless Desktop LX710 Laser				
Cordless Desktop S510				
Desktop MK120	2010			
Wireless Combo MK220	c. 2011			
Wireless Combo MK235		1x Logitech K235 Keyboard 1x Logitech M170 Mouse 1x AA Batteries (Various Brands Usually Duracell or GP) 1x Logitech Nano receiver (Non-Unifying)		
Wireless Combo MK240				
Wireless Combo MK345		1x Logitech K345 keyboard 1x Logitech M275 Mouse 1x Logitech Nano receiver (Non-Unifying)		
Wireless Combo MK270		1x Logitech K270 keyboard 1x Logitech M185 mouse 1x Logitech Nano receiver (Non-Unifying)		
Wireless Combo MK320		1x Logitech K330 keyboard 1x Logitech M215 mouse 1x Logitech Unifying receiver		
Wireless Combo MK330				
Wireless Combo MK520		1x Logitech K520 keyboard 1x Logitech M310 mouse 1x Logitech Unifying receiver		
Wireless Combo MK520r				
Wireless Combo MK620				
Wireless Desktop MK710	2010	1x Logitech MK700 keyboard 1x Logitech M705 mouse 1x Logitech Unifying receiver		
MK850 Performance		1x Logitech K850 keyboard 1x Logitech M720 Triathlon mouse 1x Logitech Unifying receiver		
MX800 Performance Combo		1x Logitech K800 Illuminated keyboard 1x Logitech Performance MX Mouse 1x Logitech Unifying receiver		
MX900 Performance Combo		1x Logitech K800 Illuminated keyboard 1x Logitech MX Master 2S Mouse 1x Logitech Unifying receiver		

== Other ==
=== Scanners ===
- Logitech ScanMan (1989) — Hand-held, binary gray-scale scanner; connector: ISA adapter card (PC).
- Logitech ScanMan 32 — Hand-held, 32 gray-scale scanner; connector: ISA adapter card (PC), DB-25F (Mac).
- Logitech ScanMan II (1991) — Portable, hand-held scanner; connector: DB-25F; M/N S-SMA2.
- Logitech ScanMan EasyTouch — Portable, hand-held, 256 gray-scale scanner, 400 DPI; connector: DB-25F; M/N 0055.
- Logitech ScanMan 256 (1992) — Hand-held, 256 gray-scale scanner; connector: DB-25F; M/N 0058.
- Logitech ScanMan Color — Hand-held, color scanner, 400 DPI; connector: DB-25F; M/N 5102.
- Logitech ScanMan Color 2000 (1996) — Hand-held, 24bit color scanner, 400x800 DPI (1600x1600 DPI interpolated); connector: DB-25F or DB-36F Centronics.
- Logitech ScanMan PowerPage — Full-page, sheet-fed scanner.
- Logitech ScanMan PageScan Color — Full-page, sheet-fed, 24bit color scanner, 400 DPI; connector: DB-25F; M/N F-MA4.

=== Writing instruments ===
- Logitech io (2002) — Personal digital pen, ballpoint pen that records the hand written text
- Logitech io_{2} (2004) — Digital writing system, ballpoint pen that records the hand written text

=== Notebook stands ===
- Logitech Alto Connect (2007) — X-shaped notebook Stand with four port USB hub built-in.
- Logitech Alto Express (2007) — Clear plastic notebook stand.

=== Notebook cases ===
- Kinetik 15.4 Backpack (2007)
- Kinetik 15.4 Briefcase (2007)

=== Video security systems ===
- Logitech Wilife

=== Hubs ===
- Logitech Premium 4-port USB hub (2007)

=== Video game consoles ===
- Logitech G Cloud (2022)

=== Streaming lights ===
- Logitech Litra Glow (2022)

=== Mousepads ===
- Logitech PowerPlay

== See also ==
- Squeezebox
- 3Dconnexion
