= Wireless keyboard =

Computer keyboard wirelessly connected to a computer

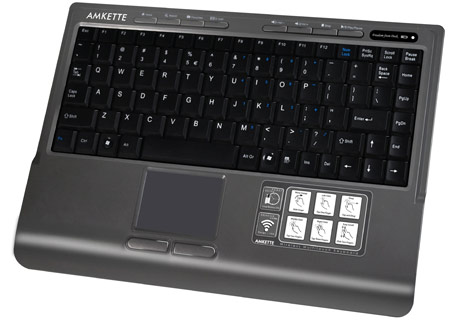
Visual depiction of a compact wireless keyboard

A wireless keyboard is a computer keyboard that allows the user to communicate with computers, tablets, or laptops with the help of wireless technologies such as radio frequency (RF), WiFi, Bluetooth, or infrared (IR) technology.

Wireless keyboards based on infrared technology use light waves to transmit signals to other infrared-enabled devices. In case of radio frequency technology, a wireless keyboard communicates using signals which range from 27 MHz to up to 2.4 GHz. The majority of wireless keyboards today work on 2.4 GHz radio frequency. Bluetooth is another technology that is being widely used by wireless keyboards. These devices connect and communicate with their parent device via the Bluetooth protocol.

A wireless keyboard can be connected using RF technology with the help of two parts: a transmitter and a receiver. The radio transmitter is inside the wireless keyboard. The radio receiver plugs into a keyboard port or USB port. Once the receiver and transmitter are plugged in, the computer recognizes the keyboard and mouse as if they were connected via a cable.

== Types ==
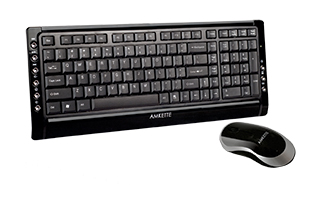
A wireless keyboard combo

- Standard-size wireless keyboard — These are standard-sized wireless keyboards.
- Foldable — hinges allow for folding of keyboard
- Portable keyboard with touchpad — Keyboard comes with integrated touchpad
- Portable with Stand — comes with tablet/smartphone stand
- Roll-up wireless keyboard — wireless keyboard that can be rolled up when not in use.
- Mini Wireless Keyboard — Palm-sized keyboard with an integrated touch pad; uses thumb typing
- Slim keyboard
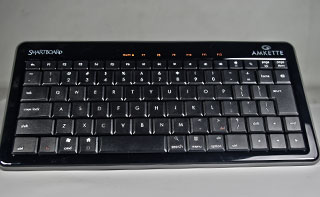
  Bluetooth keyboard

== Bluetooth keyboard ==
A Bluetooth keyboard is a wireless keyboard that connects and communicates with its parent device via the Bluetooth protocol. These devices are widely used with portable devices such as smartphones and tablets, though they are also used with laptops, ultrabooks, and even regular desktop computers.

Wireless keyboards first emerged in the early 1980s, although these were usually prototypes for specialized jobs. By the early 2000s, Bluetooth keyboards for PCs had started to gain market share, with Microsoft unveiling the world’s first commercially available Bluetooth wireless mouse and keyboard solution in April 2002, a combination that remains commercially popular to this day.

Bluetooth keyboards became especially popular starting in 2011, coinciding with the popularity of portable devices such as smartphones and the recently released iPad.

Most Bluetooth keyboards have standard qwerty layouts, though some mini Bluetooth keyboards may have a different layout. Bluetooth keyboards are compatible with all the leading operating systems such as Android, iOS, Linux, macOS, and Windows. Since they are primarily used for portable devices, Bluetooth keyboards have special function keys for Android and iOS operating systems. Most Bluetooth keyboards, except a few, are not universally compatible across operating systems. Thus, compatibility of the keyboard should be checked before purchasing one; this is mainly because of the special function keys which differ between Android and iOS.

== See also ==
- Apple Wireless Keyboard
- Logitech Unifying receiver
- Remote control
