= Mousepad =

Mat on which a computer mouse is used

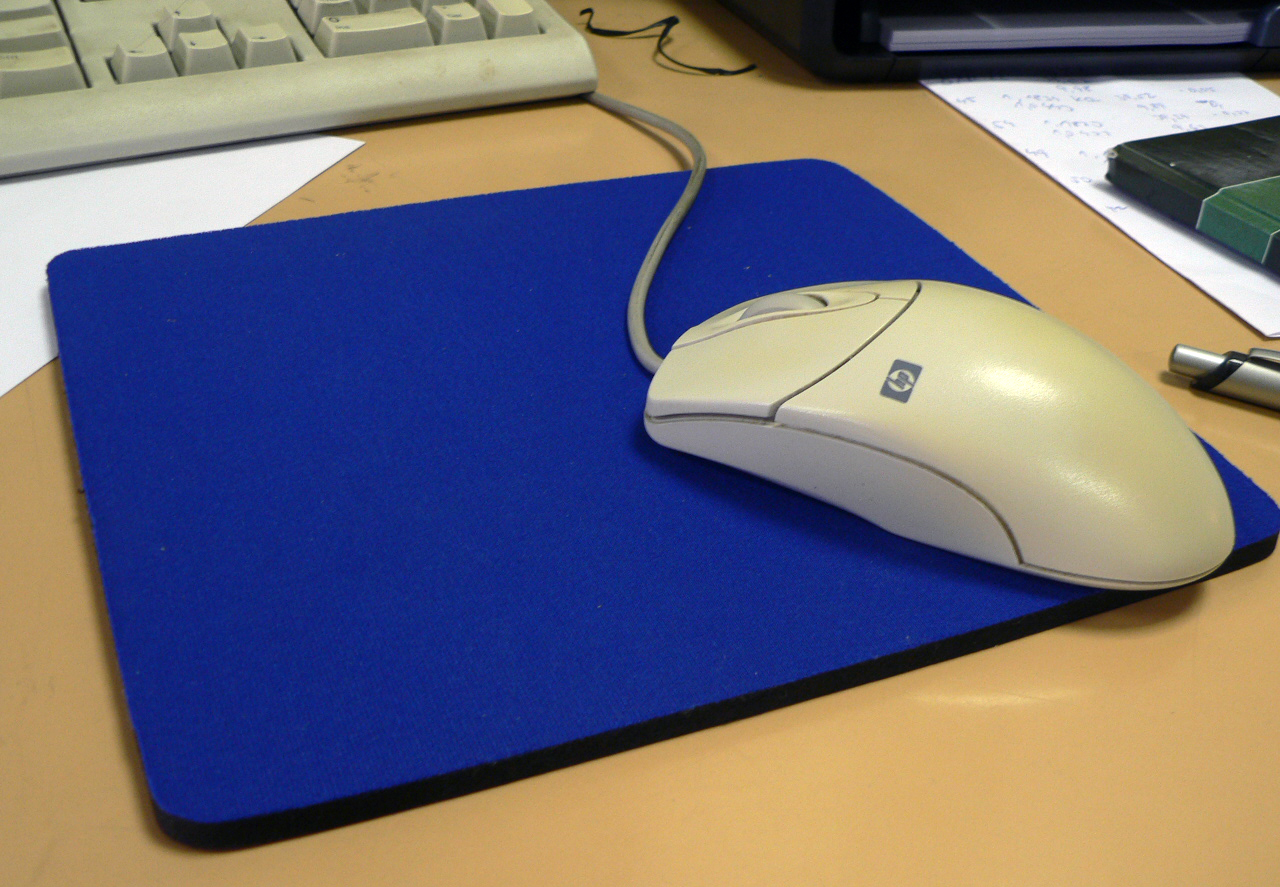
A mouse and mousepad

A mousepad or mousemat is a surface for placing and moving a computer mouse. A mousepad enhances the usability of the mouse compared to using a mouse directly on a table by providing a surface to allow it to measure movement accurately and without jitter. Some mousepads increase ergonomics by providing a padded wrist rest.

== History ==
Mousetray screenshot from Engelbart's video

During a 1967 presentation by Douglas Engelbart marking the public debut of a mouse, Engelbart used a control console designed by Matt P. Brown of Herman Miller that included a keyboard and an inset portion used as a support area for the mouse. According to Kelley and also stated by Alex Pang, Kelley designed the first mousepad a year later, in 1969.

Details of a mousepad designed by Armando M. Fernandez were published in the Xerox Disclosure Journal in 1979 with the description:

CRT Cursor Control Mechanism Pad
To assist the operation of a cathode ray tube pointer 10 wherein a metal ball is rolled on a hard surface, the disclosed pad may be utilized. A resilient, rubber-like material 12 is bonded or otherwise attached to a hard base material 14 which keeps the rubber-like material flat. The base has four rubber-like pads 16 on the opposite side from the resilient material to refrain the pad from sliding on the surface of a table, for instance.

— Xerox Disclosure Journal, Volume 4, Number 6, November/December 1979

By 1982, most users of the Xerox ball mouse were using special pads to increase the friction of the ball in the mouse.

The first commercial manufacturer of mousepads was Moustrak, founded by Bob McDermand. The company began gaining traction when Apple decided to distribute its mousepads, featuring the Apple logo, to computer stores in the United States. Moustrak signed licensing deals with Disney, Paramount, and LucasFilm, and advertised in magazines including MacWorld. However, by the end of the 1980s, lower cost mousepads turned the product into a commodity.

The Oxford English Dictionary tracks the term mouse pad to the August 24, 1983, publication of InfoWorld, and the predominantly British term mousemat to October 17, 1989, in the publication 3D.

== Benefits ==
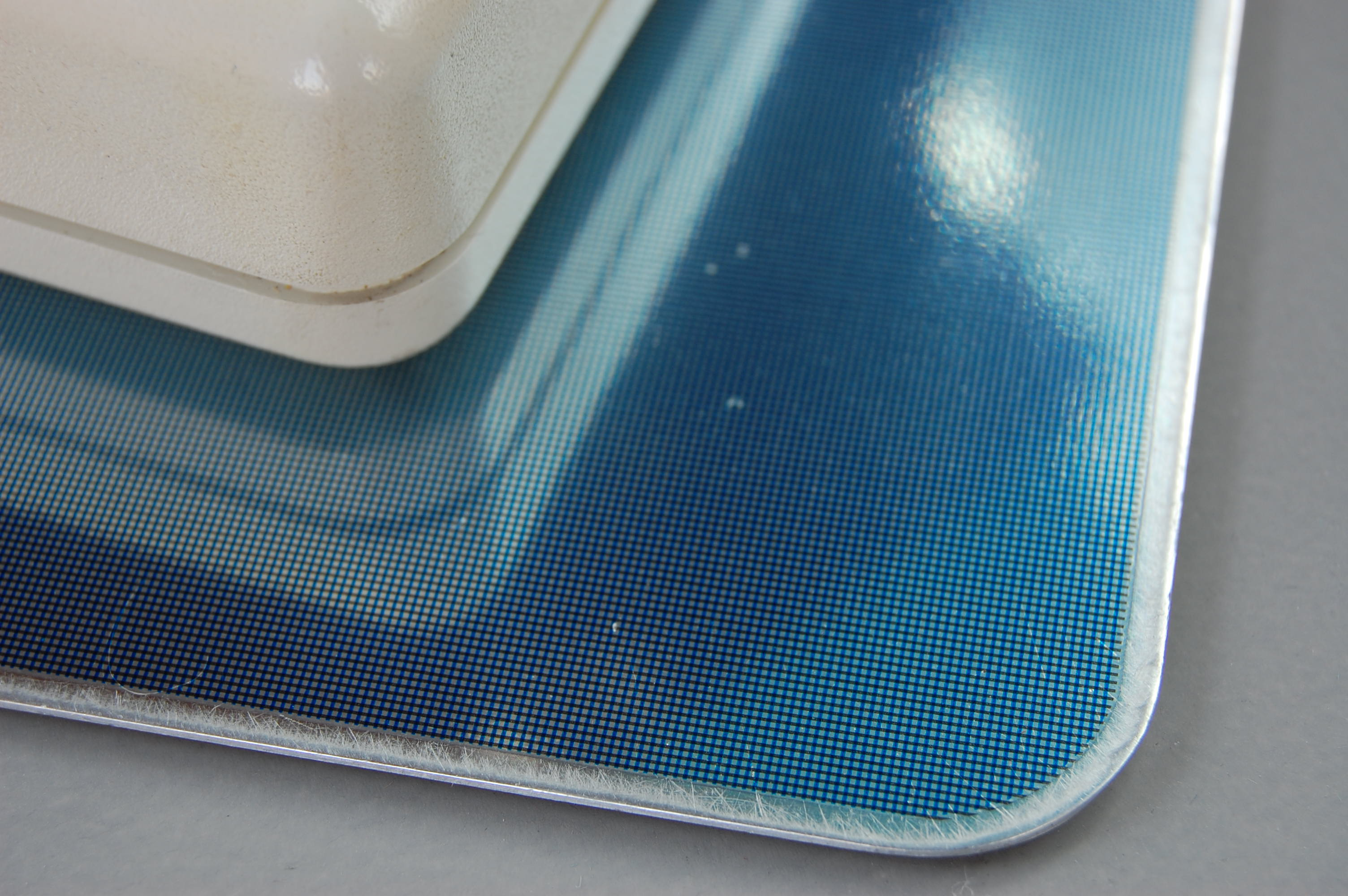
The mousepad for early Mouse Systems optical mouses

The three most important benefits of the introduction of the mousepad were higher speed, more precision, and comfort for the user. A secondary benefit was keeping the desk or table surface from being scratched and worn by continuous hand and mouse rubbing motion. Another benefit was reduction of the collection of debris under the mouse, which resulted in reduced jitter of the pointer on the display. Also, it is important to clean mousepads.

The mousepads can be cleaned by special detergents, liquid soap, hand wash or dry cleaning. Not all mousepads are machine washable.

When optical mice, which use image sensors to detect movement, were first introduced into the market, they required special mousepads with optical patterns printed on them. Modern optical mice can function to an acceptable degree of accuracy on plain paper and other surfaces. However, some optical mouse users (especially gamers, designers, and other heavy users) may prefer a mousepad for comfort, speed and accuracy, and to prevent wear to the desk or table surface.

== Types ==
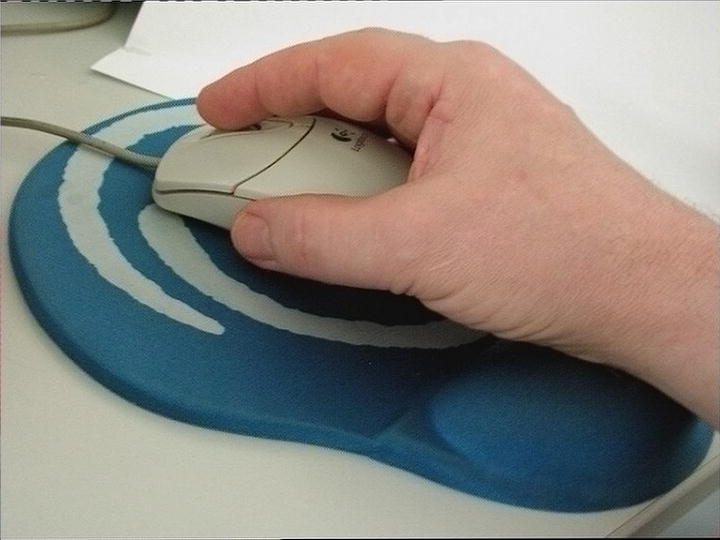
A mousepad with a padded wrist rest

A variety of mousepads exist with many different textured surfaces to fit various types of mouse technologies.

After the steel mouse ball was given a silicone rubber surface, the popular fabric-surface mousepad was found to be the most appropriate. It helped keep the rubberized roller-ball surface cleaner and gave better tracking, speed, and accuracy than just a desk surface. Such surfaces collected dirt which was then deposited onto the internal rollers that picked off ball movement. Dirty rollers caused erratic pointer movement on the screen.

Early types of optical mice have the problem of not working well on transparent or reflective surfaces such as glass or highly polished wood. These surfaces, which often include desk and table surfaces, cause jitter and loss of tracking on the display pointer as the mouse moves over these reflective spots. The use of mousepads with precision surfaces eliminates the spot-jitter effects of older and/or low-quality optical mice. Newer generations of mouse pads incorporate a wireless charging system into the pad, allowing a wireless mouse to be used without the need to replace or recharge batteries.

=== 3D mousepad ===
A 3D mousepad is a type of mousepad with a wrist rest that is modelled to resemble breasts, buttocks, or other anatomy. They are typically printed with an image of a character from an anime, manga, or video game series. 3D mousepads are sometimes subcategorized as oppai mousepads and oshiri mousepads, as derived from the Japanese slang terms oppai (おっぱい) and oshiri (おしり) for breasts and buttocks, respectively.

3D mousepads are a novelty item that have been described as a form of fan service. They typically feature a printed image of a character from an anime, manga, or video game series positioned such that the padded silicone gel wrist rest of the mousepad resembles a protruding chest or buttocks. They have been produced both officially as licensed merchandise, and unofficially as a form of fan labor to be sold at enthusiast events such as anime conventions.

Some of the earliest 3D mousepads were modeled off of characters from the erotic manga series G-Taste and the pachinko game Super Blackjack, which were shown at the trade fair CeBIT in Hanover, Germany in 2004 and sold as official merchandise at the Tokyo Character Show that same year.

3D mousepads have been produced for both female and male characters, with oppai mousepads for males typically emphasizing the character's pectoral muscles; 3D mousepads that depict non-sexual subjects, such as bird eggs or dogs, have also been produced as a humorous response to sexualized mousepads.

== Materials ==
Modern mousepads are typically made of lesser density rucomposites (open cell styrene, butadiene rubber or open cell SBR) with fabric bonded to the upper surface. However, many other types of material have been used, including fabric, plastics, recycled rubber tires, neoprene, silicone rubber, leather, glass, cork, wood, aluminum, stone and stainless steel.

== Maintenance ==
A contaminated computer setup can affect user performance, workflow, and hygiene. Research indicates that gaming and office equipment, including mouse pads, can accumulate more bacteria than a toilet seat. Studies have found that the average desk contains 400 times more bacteria than a toilet seat, with computer surfaces averaging approximately 20,961 germs per square inch.

Furthermore, the accumulation of dirt and oils on a mouse pad can impact sensor accuracy, reduce responsiveness, and contribute to material degradation over time. Regular maintenance is essential to preserving both functionality and hygiene, and cleaning a mouse pad properly can help ensure optimal performance.

== See also ==
- Computer mouse
- Touchpad
- Logitech PowerPlay
