= Logitech PowerPlay =

Wireless charging mousepad produced by Logitech

- Manufacturer: Logitech
- Type: Wireless charging mousepad
- Released: August 2017
- Connectivity: USB
- Dimensions: Pad: 27.5 cm (10.8 in) by 32 cm (12.6 in)

Logitech PowerPlay is a mousepad underlay which can charge compatible mice both at rest and while they are in use. It connects to the computer via USB and, on the pad side, features a control module which a compatible mouse can connect to via the proprietary Lightspeed protocol. Mice need to support inserting Logitech's Powercore module to capture the electromagnetic energy. The control module has a lit-up logo whose colors can be changed using software and a light to indicate whether the mouse is connected.

== History ==
According to Logitech, there were neither wireless chargers that were thin enough to fit into the mousepad nor chargers that could cover the necessary surface area when development started on PowerPlay. The 2.5 W provided by a USB port was found not to be sufficient to meet the power demand of the mouse when the field needs to be projected across the entire area of the mousepad, necessitating changes to the mouse and its firmware to reduce its consumption. The system keeps the battery between 85 and 95 percent charged to reduce wear on the battery.

The base consists of five layers which are bonded together using an adhesive-based lamination process, coming to a height of 2mm. The bottom layer provides an anti-slip texture, a middle layer is made of polycarbonate for rigidity. On top of the base, one can use a regular mousepad or place one of the two tops (cloth or hard) that come with the product.

The first prototype was built four years before the final product was released in 2017. At the launch in 2017, two mice were compatible: the G903 and the G703. At 108 and 113 grams, these were considered heavy by some players.

In August 2018, a model simply called Pro Wireless was released with compatibility for PowerPlay, weighing 80 grams (2.8 oz).

In July 2024, Logitech announced the G309 mouse with a reduced weight of 68 grams (2.4 oz) when using the Powercore module. This brings the total number of compatible mice up to 4. The pad cannot charge other wirelessly charging devices such as smartphones.

== PowerPlay 2 ==
In January 2025, a user on Reddit, discovered that Logitech filed an FCC application for a new product labeled as Charging Pad. The user discovered that a Label for the device had been published, which contained the name Powerplay 2.

The FCC also has a temporary confidentiality agreement for some information — including internal and external photos — of that product, which wouldn't expire until April 3, 2025. This would, according to the Reddit post, suggest that a release of the 2nd version of PowerPlay will happen before or on said date.

On February 25, 2025, Logitech announced the second version of Powerplay, Powerplay 2. It features a thinner design, removed lightspeed wireless connection, no hard surface option, and no RGB. Logitech started shipping in March 2025.

== See also ==
- Logitech – Swiss multinational electronics and technology company
- Gaming mice – Pointing device used to control a computer
- Mousepad – Mat on which a computer mouse is used
- List of Logitech products
