= Logitech Thunderpad Digital =

Computer game controller

ThunderPad Digital is a game controller by computer peripherals company Logitech. The drivers only supports Windows 95 to Windows 98 and will not work on Windows XP or later operating systems. The button outlay is a look-alike to the Super Nintendo Entertainment System controller.

== Specifications ==
- 8 bindable buttons
- 8 way directional pad, so called D-pad
- 15-pin game controller/MIDI connector
- "Logitech Entertainment Control Center" drivers for bindings and such

== System requirements ==
- IBM PC compatible with an i386 CPU or higher
- MS-DOS 5.0 or higher (Windows 95 recommended)
- 15-pin game controller/MIDI connector port
- CD-ROM drive for the driver disk

== Reception ==
A 2000 study on reducing repetitive strain injury (RSI) with game controller design surveyed existing controllers. The Logitech Thunderpad Digital was rated "as the worst. Between gender and age groups no significant differences were found". The study noted that "a lot of movements are seen in the intermediate zone of extension of the wrist using the Logitech Thunderpad. This can be explained by the handles being short".
