= Wrist rest =

Computer ergonomic device

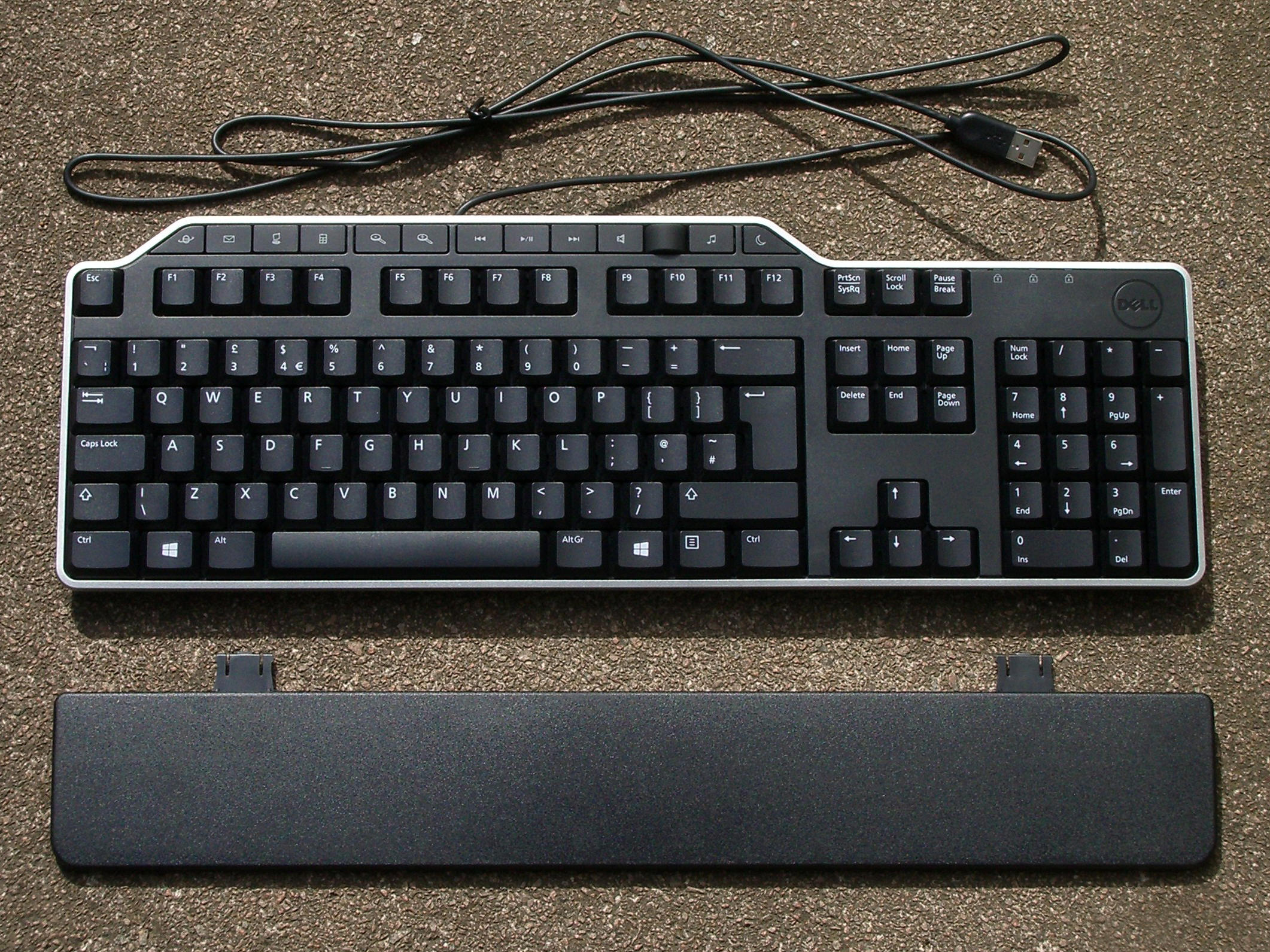
A keyboard with a detachable wrist rest.

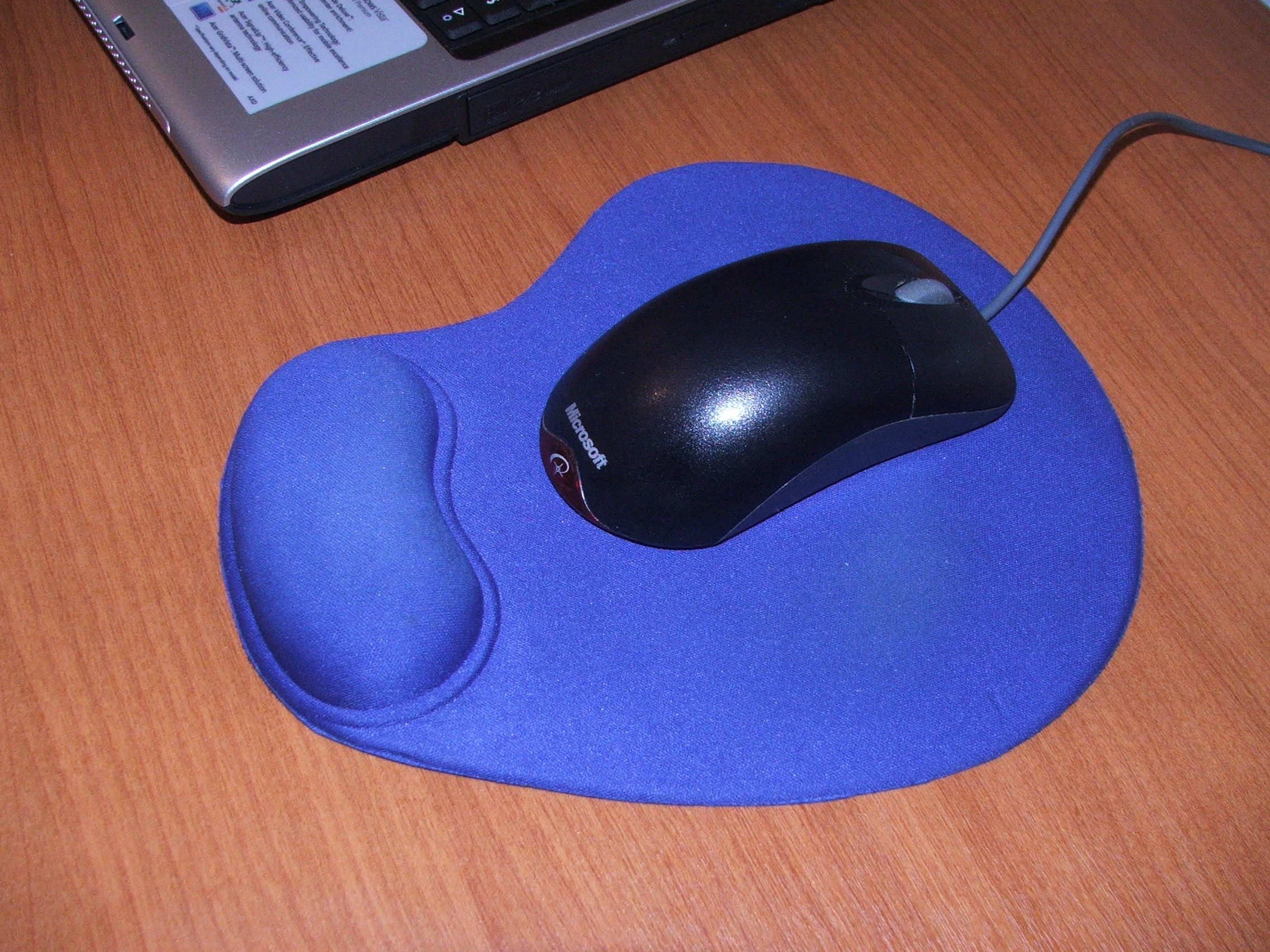
A padded mousepad with a wrist rest.

A wrist rest (a.k.a. palm rest, wrist support, or palm support) is a device used to support the wrists while using a computer keyboard or mouse. Wrist rests have common usage in the workplace.

== Design ==
Wrist rests can be made from memory foam, gel, leather, or hardwood, the most common being memory foam rests. Memory foam rests retain impressions for longer, while gel rests quickly return to their original shape. Gel rests provide more cooling. Some computer keyboards come with a wrist rest included.

== Ergonomic use ==
The wrist can be strained by the increased angle when typing without a rest.

There are mixed opinions on whether wrist rests for computer keyboards are a benefit to ergonomics.

The main benefit of using a wrist rest is increased comfort, especially for those using keyboards over long periods. Usage of a wrist rest can alleviate tension and take away pressure from the neck, shoulders and arms. Using a keyboard without a wrist rest may increase the bending angle of the wrists, causing strain and tendon irritation.

Prolonged contact between the wrists and the rest may cause carpal tunnel syndrome or tenosynovitis. Resting the wrists on a rest while typing may prevent motion of the wrist, causing issues.

To mitigate potential problems, the Occupational Safety and Health Administration (OSHA) recommends the hands to be elevated above the rest while typing. While not typing, the rest should contact the hand's palm/heel, not the wrist. As well, they recommend for the wrist rest's slope and height to match the front of the keyboard, and for the rest to be soft, with a depth of at least 3.8 centimetres (1.5 in).

=== Scientific research ===
A 2004 study published in Elsevier described the literature on the efficacy of wrist rests as "limited, inconclusive, and contradictory". Some studies have concluded that wrist rests reduce strain while others have concluded rests cause more strain. A 2018 study looked at a sample size of 25 during prolonged typing. They found wrist rests to reduce fatigue in the biceps brachii muscle but have no effect on the upper trapezius muscle.

== See also ==
- Armrest
