= Wilife =

WiLife Inc.
- Company type: Private
- Industry: Computer hardware Research and development
- Founded: 2002
- Headquarters: Draper, Utah
- Key people: Founders; Evan Tree; Andrew Hartsfield
- Products: Video Security Systems
- Number of employees: 40
- Website: www.wilife.com

WiLife, Inc. was founded in 2002 by Evan Tree and Andrew Hartsfield. The company developed a PC-based digital video surveillance system for residential and light commercial use. Their first product, LukWerks, was a mix of PC software, cameras, HomePlug technology and online services. The idea was to make it easy for any home or small business owner to set up their own professional video surveillance system.

WiLife was acquired by Logitech in November 2007.
