= Logitech Unifying receiver =

USB wireless receiver

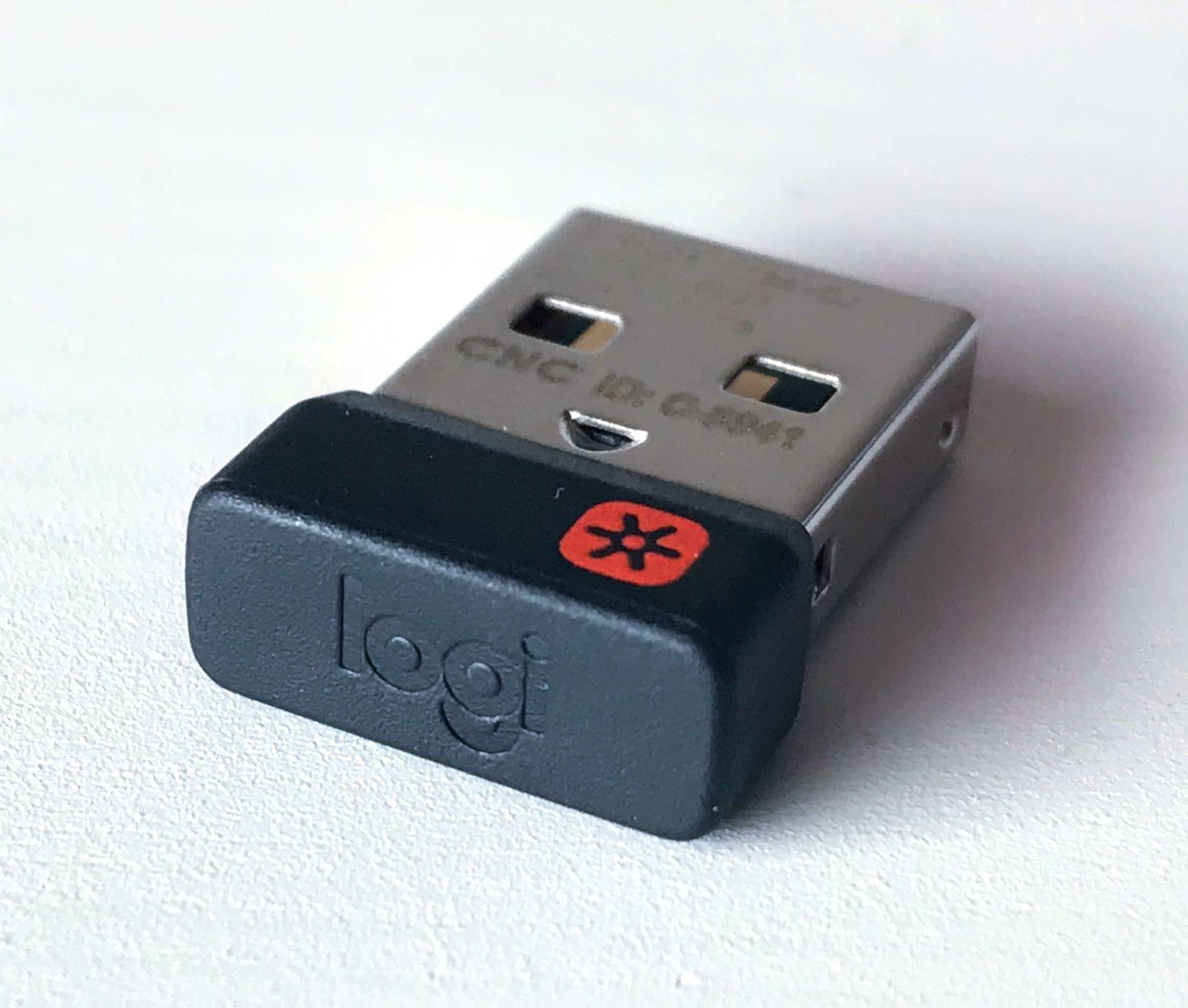
- Connects to: Human interface devices
- Manufacturer: Logitech
- Introduced: August 4, 2009; 17 years ago
- Type: Wireless dongle
- Connection: 2.4 GHz RF communication
- Ports: USB Type-A

The Logitech Unifying receiver is a small dedicated USB wireless receiver, based on the nRF24L-family of RF devices, that allows up to six compatible Logitech human interface devices (such as mice, trackballs, touchpads, and keyboards; headphones are not compatible) to be linked to the same computer using 2.4 GHz band radio communication. Receivers that are bundled with a Logitech product are paired with the device at the factory. When purchasing a replacement receiver or connecting multiple devices to one receiver, pairing requires the free-of-charge Logitech Unifying software, available for Microsoft Windows and macOS. On Linux, the Solaar software can be used to adjust the configurations. Although not compatible with Bluetooth, devices pair to Unifying Receivers in a similar way. Peripherals remain paired, and can then be used on systems not supporting the software. Logitech receivers compatible with the Unifying protocol can be identified by the orange Unifying logo, which distinguishes them from Logitech Nano receivers of similar appearance, which pair similarly but only with a single device, without using the Unifying protocol.

Logitech Unifying Receivers (LURs) are often included in wireless Logitech keyboard, mouse, and combo sets, and may be purchased separately. Some Logitech peripherals allow a receiver to be stored inside.

A newer receiver named Logitech Bolt was released in 2021 that promises lower latency and higher security, but is incompatible with Unifying products.

== Compatibility and use ==
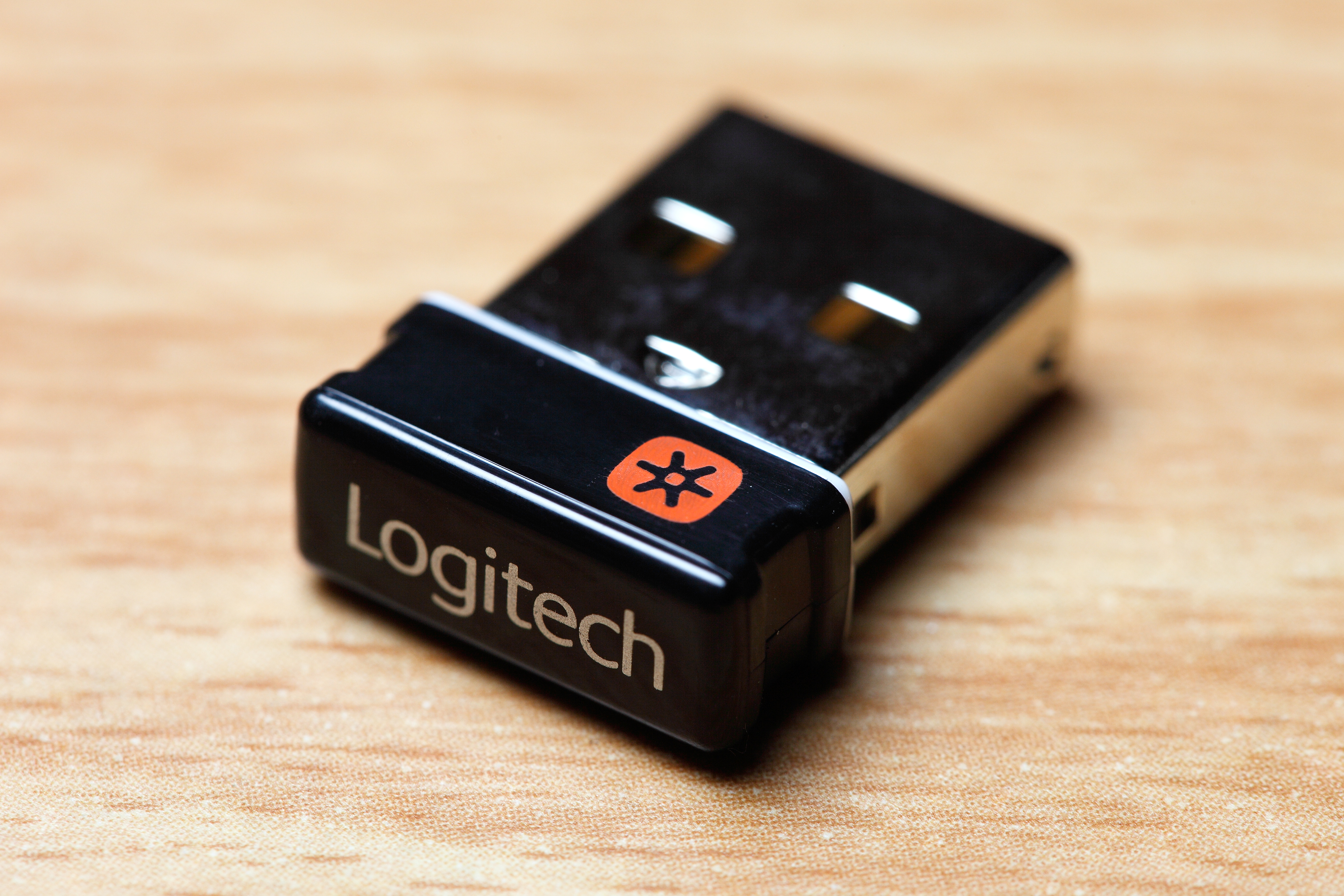
An older design for the USB receiver

Each peripheral device can pair to one receiver per profile. While most peripherals only store one profile, newer products such as the Logitech MX Master, MX Anywhere series, and M720 Triathlon allow multiple profiles. These devices can be connected to multiple receivers simultaneously. This allows the use of receivers in several computers, e.g., a desktop and a laptop computer, selecting the computer to use by changing profiles on the mouse. This multi-computer function is further augmented by Logitech Flow (software KVM solution) which is similar to Synergy. For devices without multi-computer support, the receiver and input devices can be moved together from one computer to another, maintaining their paired status after being unplugged, as the pairing information is held in the little USB receiver—this is much simpler than transferring the peripheral from one receiver to another by changing the setup in software, and also avoids the limitation to 45 pairings of older devices. This also allows the use of peripherals on computing devices that do not support Unifying Software, e.g. devices supporting USB OTG with operating systems such as Android: first pair to the receiver on a PC or Mac.

Some older Unifying devices limit the number of allowable pairing changes to a maximum of 45 times. Once the 45th connection is made, it is no longer possible to connect such a device to a different receiver. For users who often switch a Unifying device between multiple PCs or laptops with individual receivers, this connection limit can become an issue. For example, a user who frequently switches a mouse between two receivers (e.g. at work and home) will quickly exhaust the limit of available pairing switches. Logitech advises customers with this issue to contact their Customer Care. Newer devices can switch pairings an unlimited number of times.

Pairing software is available from Logitech for Microsoft Windows and Mac OS X. Wireless devices using the Unifying Receiver are supported since Linux 3.2. Software to manage Unifying devices on Linux is available from third party developers, such as Solaar.

Many companies have made peripherals that connect via USB wireless receivers very similar to Logitech's; Logitech devices are incompatible with many of these "off-brand" receivers.

There are many different hardware versions of the unifying receiver. The most common is used for daily use, and is marked CU-0007 on the metal jacket. CU-0008 is distributed with gaming devices, and features lower latency.

== Updating firmware ==
Firmware of devices and unifying receivers can be updated by using Logi Options+ software. Linux users can use fwupd to flash an updated firmware. It will automatically detect available updates for any connected unifying receivers and many other firmware updatable devices. An outdated alternative is MouseJack. It is also possible to flash on a Linux/UNIX host via a hypervisor such as VirtualBox along with a Windows virtual guest image and the Windows Logitech update executable. If using a Windows virtual guest, it is recommended to have a second available pointing device while the dongle is being updated, to allow the user to select and enable pass-through of the unifying receiver via the hypervisor task bar after executing the firmware updater so that the device is found and updated.

Updating the Unifying receiver firmware to versions RQR12.08 or greater and RQR24.06 or greater can limit some functionality of certain paired devices unless the device's firmware is also updated.

== Security ==
Several security vulnerabilities of the Logitech Unifying system were reported in 2014 and 2019, and receiver and device firmware updates were released in response.

=== MouseJacking and keyjacking ===
MouseJacking, first reported by Bastille Networks, Inc., is the sending of malicious radio signals (packets) wirelessly to an unsuspecting user through Logitech Unifying wireless technology. The exploit takes advantage of a user's vulnerable Logitech Unifying Receiver and unencrypted signals within a range of about 100 meters. Possible exploits include:

- Keystroke injection by spoofing either a paired mouse or keyboard
- Forced pairing

==== Affected devices and firmware ====
Devices
Device	USB ID
Unifying receiver	046d:c52b
Unifying receiver	046d:c539
Logitech Wireless Gaming Mouse G900	046d:c081
Logitech Wireless Keyboard K360	046d:4004
Logitech Multi-Device Wireless Keyboard K370s	046d:4061
Logitech Multi-Device Wireless Keyboard K375s	046d:4061
Logitech Wireless Touch Keyboard K400r	046d:400e, 046d:4024
Logitech Wireless Touch Keyboard K400 Plus	046d:404d
Logitech Wireless Solar Keyboard K750	046d:4002
Logitech Multi-Device Wireless Keyboard K780	046d:405b
Logitech Illuminated Living-Room Keyboard K830	046d:404c, 046d:4032
Logitech Performance Wireless Keyboard MK850	046d:4062
Logitech Wireless Mouse M335	
Logitech Zone Touch Mouse T400	046d:4026
Logitech Wireless Mouse M545	
Logitech Wireless Mouse M560	
Logitech Touch Mouse M600	046d:401a
Logitech Touch Mouse T620	046d:4027
Logitech Wireless Rechargeable Touchpad T650	046d:4101

RQR12 Firmware
Firmware Version	Vulnerabilities
012.001.00019	Affected by Bastille security issues #1, #2, #3
012.003.00025	Affected by Bastille security issues #1, #2, #3
<012.005.00028	Affected by Bastille security issues #1, #2, #3, #11, #13
012.005.00028	Affected by Bastille security issues #11, #13
012.007.00029	Affected by Bastille security issue #13

RQR24 Firmware
Firmware Version	Vulnerabilities
<024.003.00027	Affected by Bastille security issue #2, #3, #11, #13
024.003.00027	Affected by Bastille security issue #11, #13
024.005.00029	Affected by Bastille security issue #13

==== Firmware not affected ====
RQR12 Firmware
Firmware Version	Notes
012.008.00030	
012.009.00030	Identical to 012.008.00030 but DFU signed

RQR24 Firmware
Firmware Version	Notes
024.006.00030	
024.007.00030	Identical to 024.006.00030 but DFU signed

==== Response ====
Logitech has released Unifying receiver firmware updates as new exploits were reported.

=== Other vulnerabilities ===
On July 9, 2019 another set of vulnerabilities was disclosed and documented by a different researcher. A firmware update for Unifying receivers addressing the "Encryption Key Extraction Through USB" vulnerability (CVE-2019-13054/55) was released on 28 August 2019. Some users reported in 2019 that some Unifying devices were still being sold that were vulnerable to the original 2016 MouseJacking attack.

== See also ==
- Bluetooth
- Human interface device
- Logitech Harmony
