= Assetto Corsa Rally =

Sim racing racing video game

- Steam header featuring Lancia Delta HF
- Developers: Supernova Games Studios; Kunos Simulazioni
- Publisher: 505 Games
- Series: Assetto Corsa
- Platform: Windows
- Release: 13 November 2025 (early access)
- Genre: Sim racing
- Modes: Single-player, multiplayer

Assetto Corsa Rally is an upcoming sim racing video game developed by Italian developer Supernova Games Studios with technical support from Kunos Simulazioni and published by 505 Games. It launched in early access for Windows on 13 November 2025.

It is the fourth installment in the Assetto Corsa series, and the first rallying game in the franchise. Moreover, it is the first Assetto Corsa title not developed primarily by Kunos Simulazioni, as the team limited themselves to a technical support role to focus development on Assetto Corsa EVO.

== Development ==
The development of Assetto Corsa Rally is managed by Supernova Games Studios. It uses Kunos Simulazioni's proprietary physics engine combined with Unreal Engine 5, and features laser-scanned rally stages. The game includes a wide range of sound elements, such as engine noise, tire friction, gravel impact, and aerodynamic wind effects, many of which are recorded from real vehicles under various driving conditions. These recordings are adjusted to reflect differences in vehicle type, road surface, and environmental context. The title also incorporates co-driver pace notes created in collaboration with professional co-drivers and featuring their original voice recordings.

== Features ==
At launch, Assetto Corsa Rally featured 10 officially licensed cars and over 33 km of laser-scanned, real-world rally stages. As of September 2026, the game offers stages in four countries and 18 cars. Game modes include free practice, individual rally stages, and rally weekends with online leaderboards, an online multipleyer mode with public and private lobbys, and a photo mode.

Assetto Corsa Rally features rally driving supported by a co-driver who delivers detailed pace notes throughout each stage. The game incorporates dynamic environmental conditions—such as changes in road surface grip, time of day, day/night cycles, and variable weather systems that influence vehicle handling, player strategy, track visibility and ambient elements. The title includes physics-based vehicle damage and partially destructible environments.
