= Ngee Ann Polytechnic =

Post-secondary academic institution in Singapore

Coordinates: 1°20′1″N 103°46′37″E

- 义安理工学院 (Chinese); Politeknik Ngee Ann (Malay)
- Former names: Ngee Ann College (1963–1968); Ngee Ann Technical College (1968–1982)
- Type: Public; Government
- Established: 25 May 1963; 63 years ago
- Chairman: Tang Kin Fei
- Principal: Lim Kok Kiang
- Students: 13000
- Location: 535 Clementi Road, Singapore 599489
- Campus: 33.6 hectares (83 acres)
- Website: np.edu.sg
- Ngee Ann Polytechnic

Agency overview
- Jurisdiction: Government of Singapore
- Parent agency: Ministry of Education

Ngee Ann Polytechnic
- Traditional Chinese: 義安理工學院
- Simplified Chinese: 义安理工学院
Transcriptions
Standard Mandarin
- Hanyu Pinyin: Yì'ān Lǐgōng Xuéyuàn
Yue: Cantonese
- Yale Romanization: Yih-ōn Léihgūng Hohk-yuhn
- Jyutping: Ji6-on1 Lei5-gong1 Hok6-jyun6
- IPA: [ji˨.ɔn˥ lej˩˧kɔŋ˥ hɔk̚˨.jyn˨]
Southern Min
- Hokkien POJ: Gī-an Lí-kang Ha̍k-īⁿ
- Tâi-lô: Gī-an Lí-kang Ha̍k-īnn

Ngee Ann Polytechnic (NP, /ˈniː ɑːn/ NEE ahn) is a post-secondary education institution and statutory board under the purview of the Ministry of Education in Bukit Timah, Singapore.

Established in 1963 by the Ngee Ann Kongsi, NP is renowned for its business programmes and central focus on entrepreneurship education. It is also the only polytechnic in Singapore to be affiliated with a foundation.

NP is famous for producing successful entrepreneurs due to its strong ecosystem in supporting start-ups. NP's alumni include founder and former CEO of Creative Technology Sim Wong Hoo, co-founder and CEO of Carousell Quek Siu Rui, co-founder and President of Carousell Marcus Tan, co-founder and CEO of Secretlab Ian Ang, 18th Golden Horse Award for Best Leading Actor Alan Tam, and 50th Golden Horse Award for Best Narrative Feature and Best Original Screenplay Anthony Chen.

== History ==
Founded in 1963 as the Ngee Ann College by the Ngee Ann Kongsi, Ngee Ann Polytechnic started with 116 students, offering courses in language, commerce, and technology.

In December 1990, Ngee Ann Polytechnic applied for a radio station broadcasting on AM, with its programmes produced by mass communication students, concentrating on talk shows.

== Academic ==
=== Academic schools ===
There are a total of nine academic schools providing 39 full-time courses:

- School of Business & Accountancy (BA)
- School of Design & Environment (DE)
- School of Engineering (SOE)
- School of Film & Media Studies (FMS)
- School of Health Sciences (HS)
- School of Humanities & Interdisciplinary Studies (HMIS) formerly known as Humanities & Social Sciences (HMS)
- School of Infocomm Technology (ICT)
- School of Life Sciences & Chemical Technology (LSCT)

The polytechnic also offers part-time programmes for adult learners through the CET Academy. Established in 1985, the CET Academy has now trained more than 180,000 adults.

=== Programmes and scholarships ===
- The NP Youth Academy set up by the polytechnic offers programmes for students in the areas of leadership, character building, and personal development.
- The Christieara Programme is a talent development programme for high performing students through initiatives such as Overseas Merit Fellowships and Service Learning trips.
- The polytechnic awards more than 1,000 scholarships every year, and over 6,000 students benefit from financial grants amounting to about $15 million a year.

== Recognition ==
The polytechnic was conferred the Singapore Quality Class Star Award for demonstrating business excellence. The polytechnic was also awarded the President's Award for the Environment in 2014.

== Notable alumni ==
=== Athletes ===
- Hariharan Krishna, Singaporean athlete, 2023 Southeast Asian Games competitor

=== Academia ===
- Richard Yeo, American scientist known for research on diapers.

=== Business ===
- Sim Wong Hoo, founder and former CEO of Creative Technology
- Ian Ang, co-founder and CEO of Secretlab

=== Entertainment ===
- Alan Tam, 18th Golden Horse Award for Best Leading Actor
- Anthony Chen, 50th Golden Horse Award for Best Feature Film, Best New Director, and Best Original Screenplay
- Alaric Tay, Mediacorp actor
- Andie Chen, Mediacorp actor
- Nick Teo, Mediacorp actor
- Richie Koh, Mediacorp actor
- Shane Pow, former Mediacorp actor
- Derrick Hoh, singer
- Vanessa Fernandez, singer
- Boo Junfeng, film producer
- Tzang Merwyn Tong, film producer
- Cruz Teng, television presenter
- Dennis Chew, radio DJ and actor
- Gerald Koh, radio DJ
- Jean Danker, radio DJ
- Joshua Simon, radio DJ
- Vernetta Lopez, actress and radio DJ
- Maddy Barber, radio DJ
- Jamie Yeo, actress and model
- Yeo Siew Hua, film director

=== Politics ===
- Mohd Fahmi, Mayor of South East District (2020–2025) and Member of Parliament for Marine Parade GRC (2020–2025)
- Don Wee, Member of Parliament for Chua Chu Kang GRC (2020–2025)
- Lee Li Lian, Member of Parliament for Punggol East SMC (2013–2015)
- Hazlina Abdul Halim, Member of Parliament for East Coast GRC
