= Ian Ang =

Singaporean entrepreneur

- Born: Ian Alexander Ang Zheng Wei c. 1992 (age 32–33); Singapore
- Title: Co-founder and CEO of Secretlab

Ian Alexander Ang Zheng Wei (born c. 1992) is a Singaporean entrepreneur and businessman. He is the co-founder and chief executive officer of gaming chair company Secretlab.

== Career ==
In December 2014, while enrolled in an Information Systems undergraduate course, Ang partnered with fellow competitive esports player Alaric Choo to found the startup company Secretlab, which would design and produce gaming chairs. According to Ang, he decided to venture into the gaming chair industry because he could not find a chair "that would be comfortable, functional, look good and have a local warranty". Ang became the company's chief executive officer (CEO), overseeing engineering, marketing, and product strategy, while also adopting the informal Game of Thrones-inspired corporate title of "Protector of the Realm". With a starting capital of S$50,000 derived from his and Choo's personal savings, Secretlab quickly found success and reached a reported market capitalisation of S$200–300 million in August 2019. In 2020, Secretlab sold its millionth chair.

== Personal life ==
Born around 1992 in Singapore, Ang was the second of two children. While his parents tended to their automobile repair shop, he spent much of his childhood in Chong Pang with his aunt. He attended Chongfu Primary School and Orchid Park Secondary School, later graduating from Ngee Ann Polytechnic with a diploma in business studies. In his teenage years, Ang was also a competitive esports player who won a regional StarCraft II competition. In June 2021, Ang spent S$36 million on a 23,424 square foot (2,176.2 m^{2}) bungalow near the Singapore Polo Club, as well as S$15 million on a 7,007 square foot (651.0 m^{2}) triplex flat at Leedon Residence near Farrer Road.

== Recognition ==
Ang was listed in the Forbes 30 Under 30 Asia list in 2018. In November 2020, he was named Singapore's Entrepreneur of the Year and Entrepreneur of the Year for consumer products by Ernst & Young, becoming the award ceremony's youngest-ever winner. The same year, Ang was nominated for the Singaporean of the Year award presented by The Straits Times. In September 2022, he was named Young Business Leader of the Year at the 37th Singapore Business Awards.
