= Ferrari Virtual Academy =

2010 video game

- Developer: Kunos Simulazioni
- Publisher: Scuderia Ferrari
- Platform: Windows
- Release: 9 September 2010
- Genre: Racing simulation
- Mode: Single-player

Ferrari Virtual Academy (FVA) (Note: also known as Ferrari Virtual Academy 2010 Season) is a sim racing video game for Windows developed by Kunos Simulazioni in collaboration with Scuderia Ferrari. It was released on 9 September 2010. The simulation allows the player to drive a Ferrari against the clock at a race track. There are no other vehicles to race against in real time.

In January 2015, the servers (needed even for single-player gaming) were down for some time, with Ferrari ending its support for the game. As of February 2015, the simulation can be used, however it can no longer be purchased.

== Gameplay ==
Fiorano Circuit (cockpit view)

The game offers two modes: Free Practice in which driving aids such as traction control, assisted braking, visible driving line and automatic transmission are permitted and the player can decide how much fuel should be in the car; and Hot Lap mode in which no driving aids are allowed, the fuel amount is fixed and reset each lap. Times set in Hot Lap mode are entered into an online leaderboard.

The game is compatible with Thrustmaster's Ferrari F1 Wheel Integral T500 and Ferrari Wheel Add-On.

=== Content ===
The initial release offered only the Fiorano test track and the Ferrari F10 Formula One car. Purchase of the Adrenaline Pack upgrade released in November 2011 added the Mugello and Nürburgring race circuits as well as the Ferrari 150º Italia Formula One car of the 2011 season and the Ferrari 458 sports car.

== Development ==
The objective of the developers were to develop a home version of the simulator that is used to train Ferrari Formula One (F1) drivers. 12,000 man hours were spent developing the game. It was fine-tuned by F1 drivers, Fernando Alonso, Felipe Massa, and Giancarlo Fisichella. Technologies like laser scanning and motion capture were used in designing the circuits and the driving dynamics.

The developer, Kunos Simulazioni, said the game is an evolution from their previous game, netKar Pro (2006), and noted that there is a big generational gap between Ferrari Virtual Academy and their next game, Assetto Corsa (2014).

== Reception ==
Reception

Review scores
Publication	Score
The Games Machine (Italy)	72%
Giochi per il mio computer	8.5/10
Level	9/10

The Games Machine liked the realistic handling model and excellent force feedback but criticized the lack of content. Giochi per il mio computer called it the best Formula One simulator. Level liked the quality of the simulation, car modeling, and circuit reproduction but disliked the lack of content and absence of dynamic race conditions.
