= Project Motor Racing =

- cover art featuring a Lamborghini SC63
- Developer: Straight4 Studios
- Publisher: GIANTS Software
- Directors: Ian Bell (former); Kevin Boland
- Designers: Doug Arnao; Austin Ogonoski
- Composer: Stephen Baysted
- Engine: GIANTS Engine 10
- Platforms: PlayStation 5; Windows; Xbox Series X/S
- Release: 25 November 2025
- Genre: Sim racing
- Modes: Single-player, multiplayer

Project Motor Racing is a 2025 sim racing video game developed by Straight4 Studios and published by GIANTS Software. It was previously developed under the supervision of game director Ian Bell until his departure in 2026, who led the creation of the Project CARS series under his previous company, Slightly Mad Studios. The game officially released on 25 November 2025 to widespread negative reception from critics and players.

Less than two weeks after the game's release following poor reception, Straight4 Studios laid off an undisclosed amount of staff, citing a need to reduce the size of the team after "exploring every possible alternative".

== Gameplay ==
Project Motor Racing features a detailed driver career mode for its single-player campaign, giving players the option to start with a budget ranging from an amateur beginning in low-cost race cars to a professional driver with immediate access to high-end sports cars, with a fourth option catering to historic motorsport. Players also work with a sponsorship model, and may be punished or rewarded depending on the player's performance on track. Depending on the region of the in-game championship the player chooses to participate in, the standard payout per race may also be different in every car class.

In both single-player and multiplayer, players can race up to 31 AI opponents. Console versions, however, are limited to 15 AI opponents in single-player, prioritizing stable, high-quality play at 1440p and 60 fps. Some vehicle classes and circuits are represented as unlicensed, directly resembling real-world vehicles, locations, and car classes in all but name. This includes Brianza (Monza Circuit), Lexington (Mid-Ohio Sports Car Course), Northampton (Silverstone Circuit), San Marino (Imola Circuit), Takimiya (Okayama International Circuit), and the JP1/JP2 class (Super GT GT500).

== Development ==
Ian Bell, former CEO of Slightly Mad Studios, announced in 2022 that a new game under his supervision was in development under the name GTR Revival, a nod to GTR and GTR 2, which were games that Bell was involved in developing as part of SimBin. According to Bell, much of the new team working on the game included previous staff from SimBin and Slightly Mad Studios that worked on the GTR and Project CARS series. The game would also be developed with "zero publisher input". It was later renamed GT Revival, and again as Project Motor Racing in 2024. The game uses Straight4 Studios' Hadron proprietary physics engine, which runs alongside GIANTS Engine 10, the engine used on the Farming Simulator series. It previously utilized Unreal Engine 5 in an early test build previewed by game designer Doug Arnao in 2023.

During development, Straight4 Studios introduced a 'Factory Driver Program', an invite-only beta test that was limited to experienced sim racers and professional racing drivers, in which the developers used as a resource to gain development feedback. In addition to the beta test, they also acquired professional racing driver and former The Stig on Top Gear, Ben Collins, as a consultant. Stephen Baysted was also acquired as a composer for the game. Collins and Baysted were previously involved in the Project CARS series. Some vehicles teased in preview images by Straight4 Studios, including a selection of Ferrari race cars, did not make the final release. No statement has been released by Straight4 Studios.

=== Post-release ===
Shortly after release, Straight4 Studios released a statement acknowledging the game's issues, while also promising a road map for future updates to the game. On 8 December 2025, Straight4 Studios announced its decision to reduce the size of its development team in the wake of Project Motor Racing's issue-filled launch. Despite this, the studio reiterated that it would remain "committed to deliver all the DLC in the Year 1 season pass".

On 25 March 2026, Straight4 Studios released version 2.0 of the game, treating the update as a "soft relaunch". The update included an overhauled user interface, updates to the tire model, enhancements to graphics, bug fixes, and a preview of a new DLC featuring JGTC and Super GT race cars. Originally licensed content, the DLC was temporarily delisted and later re-released, with Straight4 Studios losing the rights to the "GT500" name. On 18 May 2026, Straight4 Studios announced Aristotelis Vasilakos had joined as Chief Creative Officer. Vasilakos previously worked as a physics developer under Kunos Simulazioni. On 29 July 2026, Chief Development Officer Kevin Boland succeeded Ian Bell as Chief Executive Officer of Straight4 Studios.

== Reception ==
Reception

Aggregate scores
| Aggregator | Score |
|---|---|
| Metacritic | (PC) 64/100 (PS5) 58/100 |
| OpenCritic | 16% recommend |

Review score
| Publication | Score |
|---|---|
| IGN | 5/10 |

Project Motor Racing received "mixed or average" reviews from critics, according to review aggregator website Metacritic. Fellow review aggregator OpenCritic assessed that the game received weak approval, being recommended by 16% of critics.

Writing for IGN, Luke Reilly described the game as "an early access game that hasn’t actually been identified as such." Reilly felt many aspects of the game were unfinished, including AI behavior, penalty system, career mode, and graphical fidelity, describing the overall racing experience as "frustratingly close to being entirely decent". While he credited the game's strict focus towards racing cars, Reilly was equally critical of the cars' inconsistencies with regards to vehicle physics across different cars, ranging from "compliant" to "undriveable".

Community response to Project Motor Racing was highly critical upon release, with criticism focused on the game's handling, force feedback, AI behavior, and performance optimization issues. On Steam, the game received "very negative" reviews from players. Straight4 Studios released a statement shortly after release, acknowledging the game's issues, while also promising a road map for future updates to the game.
