= Mad Rally =

2006 video game

- Developer(s): TMReality
- Publisher(s): Play Publishing
- Platform(s): Microsoft Windows
- Release: 4 May 2006
- Genre(s): Racing

Mad Rally is a racing video game developed by an internal team based in Poland known as TMReality and published by Play Publishing for Windows. In the game, the player has to progress through the career mode while unlocking better vehicles.

== Gameplay ==
Each race consists of 4 vehicles – one controlled by the player, while the other three by artificial intelligence. There are 4 game modes.

- Career - The main mode of the entire game which leads to progression in the game and unlocks new vehicles. The goal of the player is to get a podium finish in 7 of the 16 available tracks.
- Tourist - Player is alone and free to observe and race anywhere on the race track.
- Time Trial - Has the player race against the clock in the fastest time possible.
- Race - Features a competitive mode against other opponents but will not progress the game forward as opposed to career mode.

== Vehicles ==
The game consists of 7 different Polish cars out of which one is available for use and the rest 6 can be unlocked by progressing through the career mode. Following are the 7 cars:

| Cars | Weight | Horsepower |
|---|---|---|
| Basic | 950 kg | 25 hp |
| Lux | 875 kg | 30 hp |
| Police | 840 kg | 35 hp |
| Pickup | 1200 kg | 50 hp |
| Hatchback | 850 kg | 60 hp |
| Cabrio | 910 kg | 70 hp |
| Sporting | 930 kg | 90 hp |

== Routes ==
There are 9 different tracks in career mode which can be unlocked by playing the game. Out of all the 16 tracks, some tracks are reversed. Following are the 9 tracks:

| Track | Length |
|---|---|
| The Stadium | 1200 m |
| The Mall | 2500 m |
| The Factory | 1200 m |
| The Docks | 1200 m |
| The Slums | 2500 m |
| Downtown | 2500 m |
| Around the Lake | 8400 m |
| Commercial St. | 2500 m |
| The Mountain Road | 1200 m |

== Reception ==
Mad Rally received negative reviews, getting 24% on AG.ru.

== See also ==
- List of driving/racing style video games
- Racing video game
- Sim racing
