= Andaseat =

Gaming chair company

- Type: Private
- Founded: 2016
- Headquarters: Shenzhen, China
- Products: Gaming chairs
- Website: Official website

Andaseat is a Chinese based gaming chair manufacturing company. It operates in the United States, Canada, United Kingdom, Europe, Australia, and Asia, with its headquarters in Shenzhen. Andaseat chairs are choices for esport teams such as Natus Vincere, EXCEL, Fnatic etc. The products of Andaseat have met positive responses from IGN, Kotaku, Forbes, PC Gamer, CNET, PCMag.

== History ==
Andaseat was founded in 2016 with its own Esport Brand Anda Seat. It uses a direct-to-consumer distribution model and collaborates with Esport teams to design comfortable gaming chairs. Andaseat serves as Fnatic official gaming chair partner, and as the official supplier of the Fnatic Edition Gaming Chair. Its Fnatic Edition gaming chair has met positive responses. Andaseat is the Official Gaming Chair Supplier for Escel Esports League of Legends Championship (LEC) team, BTXL, Northern League of Legends Championship (NLC) roster. Andaseat cooperates with Natus Vincere (NAVI) to support the NAVI team with the NAVI chair.
