= Simulation cockpit =

Cockpit used for training pilots with a flight simulator

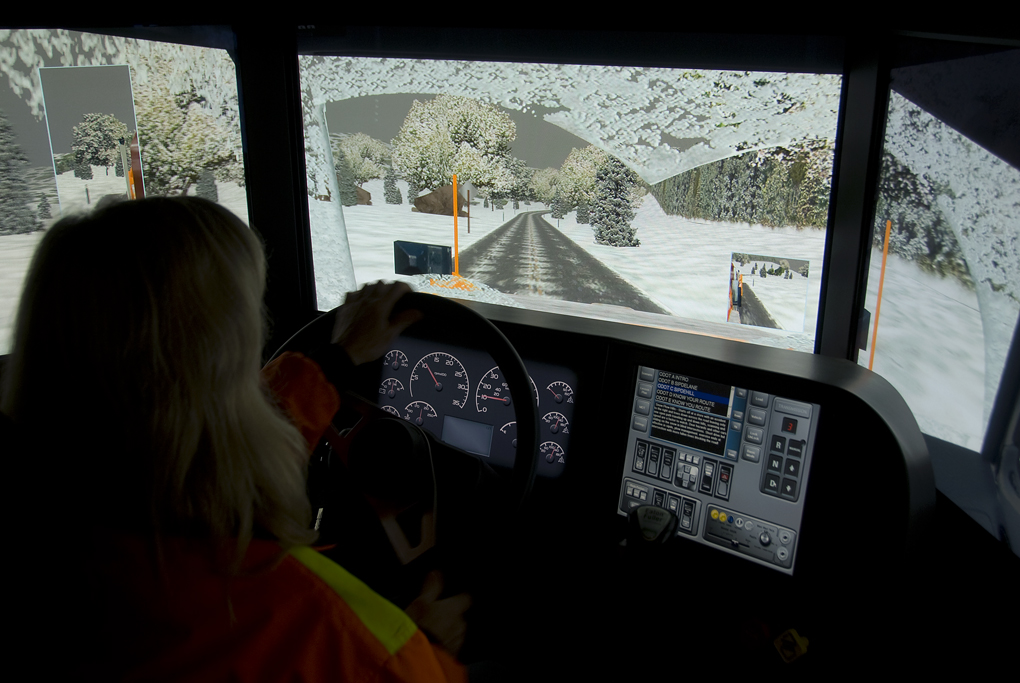

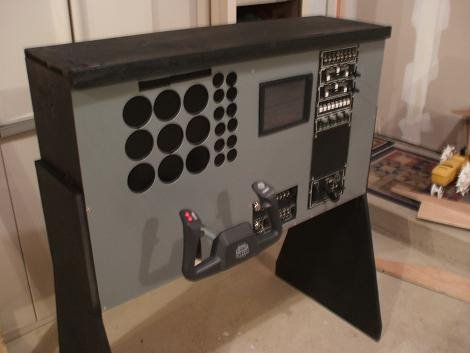
Simpit example

A simulation cockpit, simpit or sim rig is an environment designed to replicate a vehicle cockpit. Although many pits commonly designed around an aircraft cockpit, the term is equally valid for train, spacecraft or car projects.

'Simpit' is generally used to refer to amateur, home built, setups which are the focus of this article. For more information on commercial flight simulators please see Flight Simulator.

== Aircraft simpits ==
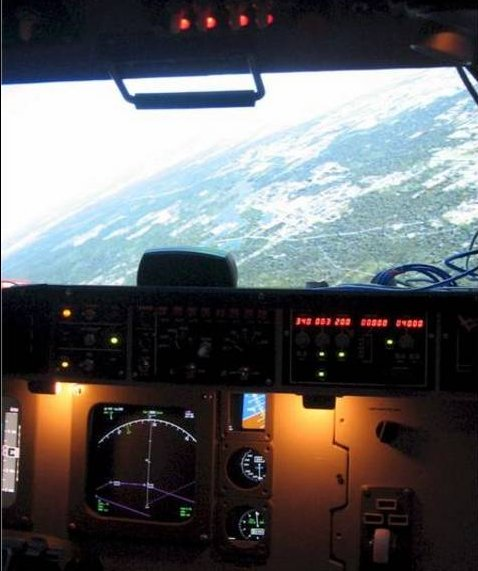
A homebuilt Boeing-style simulator using generic hardware

By their very nature, aircraft cockpits tend to have complex controls, instrumentation, and radios not present in other types of simulation. Recreating these present specific additional challenges to anyone building a cockpit. Aircraft components are often expensive to purchase, and access to real aircraft cockpits is likely to be restricted due to security concerns, especially in the wake of the 9/11 attacks or if the builder has chosen a current military aircraft.

A way to avoid a lot of the pitfalls is to not replicate a specific aircraft, simply a class of aircraft. Thus creating a generic GA, airliner, or military cockpit, which while it will not have every button or switch of the real aircraft, will have all the key elements for simulation. The other end of the scale is to build an exact 1:1 replica of the real cockpit, using real panels or even a complete cockpit from the chosen plane. All cockpit builds will be somewhere between these two concepts, and even highly accurate replica pits will often make some concessions, if only due to limitations of the simulation software driving them.

For replica pits, the choice of aircraft will be key. With the growth of home cockpits, there are a number of companies who sell complete kits for common aircraft, and the details of current Airbus and Boeing aircraft panels are fairly easy to obtain. For older aircraft, museums or scrap yards can be valuable sources of information. However, while research will often locate a lot of information, sometimes it is a minor detail that is needed. For example, how wide the center pedestal is, how large it should be, or its relative placement in the pit. Where the information is not in the public domain, more subtle techniques have been developed to obtain the information. For example, pixel counting from a digital photo of the aircraft. By counting the pixels in an item of known size, for example, a standard cockpit instrument, a scale can be established. This can then be used to estimate the size of unknown elements in the panel. Accuracy will vary depending on the quality of the photo located, the angle the shot was taken from, etc. However, this can give a good guideline on dimensions in situations where there may be no other source of information.

The level of functionality will also vary within the 'pit'. Very realistic-looking pits may have nonfunctioning instruments, simply in place to complete the 'feel' of the cockpit. At the top end of realism would be individual real instruments, either modified from actual aircraft components or replicated. This approach provides the maximum immersion, but presents a dramatic increase in building complexity, with interface electronics needing to be fabricated and the associated software drivers needing to be written. A compromise between the two is to display the instruments on a monitor and mount this behind the panel. The simulated instruments can then be seen through the cutouts which can give a realistic effect, especially if the aircraft uses 'glass cockpit' displays in real life.

=== General aviation ===
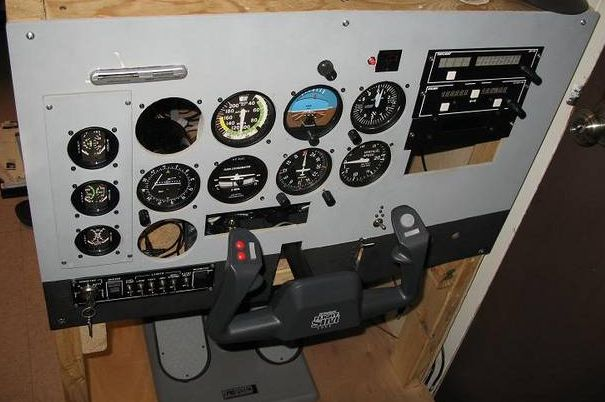
A homebuilt simulator panel using commercially available instruments

Home-based simulators have been a common training aid for private pilots for many years. Recently, the increased power of home PCs and improvements in graphics and simulation technology has opened up further opportunities to use a PC as a training aid. It is now easy to achieve a high-fidelity training experience in one's own living room using off-the-shelf commercial products. While early simulators allowed instrument approaches to be practiced, with photographic scenery add-ins, pilots can now practice visual flights and navigation. Rehearsing a flight in the PC before performing it in the real world can make training sessions in real aircraft more productive.

Recognizing this market, a number of suppliers provide ready-to-go desktop simulation products. Radio stacks, instruments, yokes, pedals, throttle quadrants, and seats are readily available from pilot shops. This allows a highly realistic GA cockpit to be put together in a matter of minutes. However an enthusiast is likely to extend well beyond the functional cockpit a trainee would require, adding in items to enhance the suspension of disbelief. Enclosures, projectors, even real aircraft components or nose sections are commonly incorporated in the drive to make the experience as 'real' as possible.

=== Commercial aviation ===
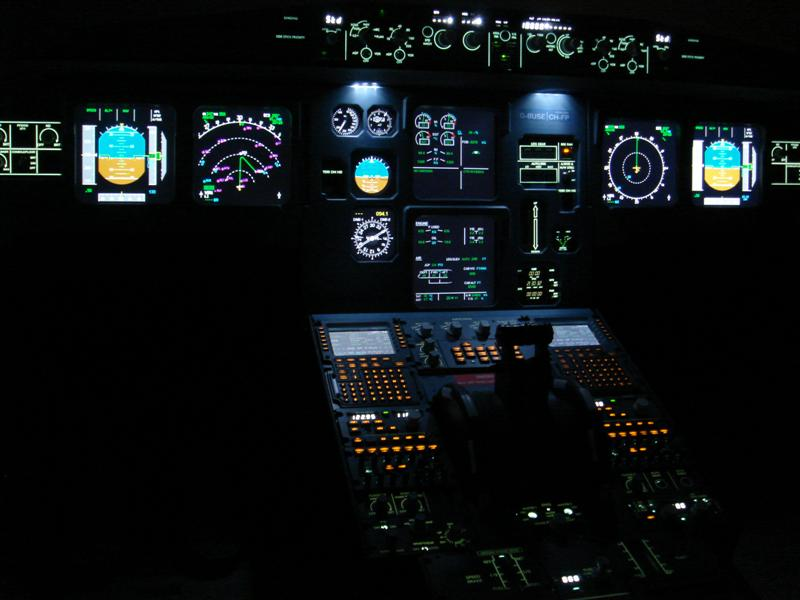
A home built Airbus simulator cockpit

While general aviation pits are commonly used by real pilots to train on, commercial aircraft pits are often purely for entertainment. Most people, excepting professional pilots, do not have the opportunity to pilot a real airliner, instead trying the experience on a simulator, with some building larger pits of their own at home.

Commercial airliner pits offer a greater challenge to builders as there are more systems to model such as the autopilot, CDU/FMS, engine management, etc. Even the throttle quadrant is a complex piece of engineering compared to the simply replicated push/pull throttle used in the GA Cessna. However, a number of commercial suppliers exist supplying replica panels, controls, even complete cockpits to the community. Where these or 'real' components are not available or are out of budget builders will often fabricate components at home out of wood or similar easily worked materials.

With most modern aircraft using "glass cockpit" displays it has become easier to create highly realistic panels. The displays on these panels can be driven by multi-head graphics cards, or networked PCs running dedicated software that can read from the simulator spreading the processing load. Interfaces for switches, knobs, and other elements needed can be purchased commercially or created by dismantling existing hardware such as keyboards or joysticks. Feedback from the PC to the panel, for example to light warning lamps or move a real instrument is more complex and normally completed through a commercial expansion board.

=== Military aviation ===
The third common genre for a simpit is the military pit. Like commercial pits, these sims are typically designed more for entertainment than training. Military-based pits are commonly based on a single aircraft, often the F-16, due to the availability of highly realistic simulation software (Falcon 4.0) of this aircraft.

=== Software ===
One of the first software requirements for a simpit is a suitable flight simulator to provide the graphics, sound and instrument outputs for the pit. To date, the majority of civilian simpits are built around Microsoft Flight Simulator, and most military pits use Falcon 4.0 as a base, but as of 2013 the Digital Combat Simulator series has spurred interest for the A-10 as well. X-Plane 11 is also a powerful software package, with strong support for multiple screens.

Voice communication (VoIP) software is commonly integrated into a simpit, as this allows real-time communication with other virtual pilots.

Other software may be custom written to control hardware aspects of the pit; e.g. an interpreter for an MFD or a custom listener to implement an AoA Indexer. In many cases the need for custom software can be removed by using control hardware with a comprehensive SDK or API, but frequently an off-the-shelf solution is not available for unique instruments and so citation software is needed.

== Car racing sim rigs ==
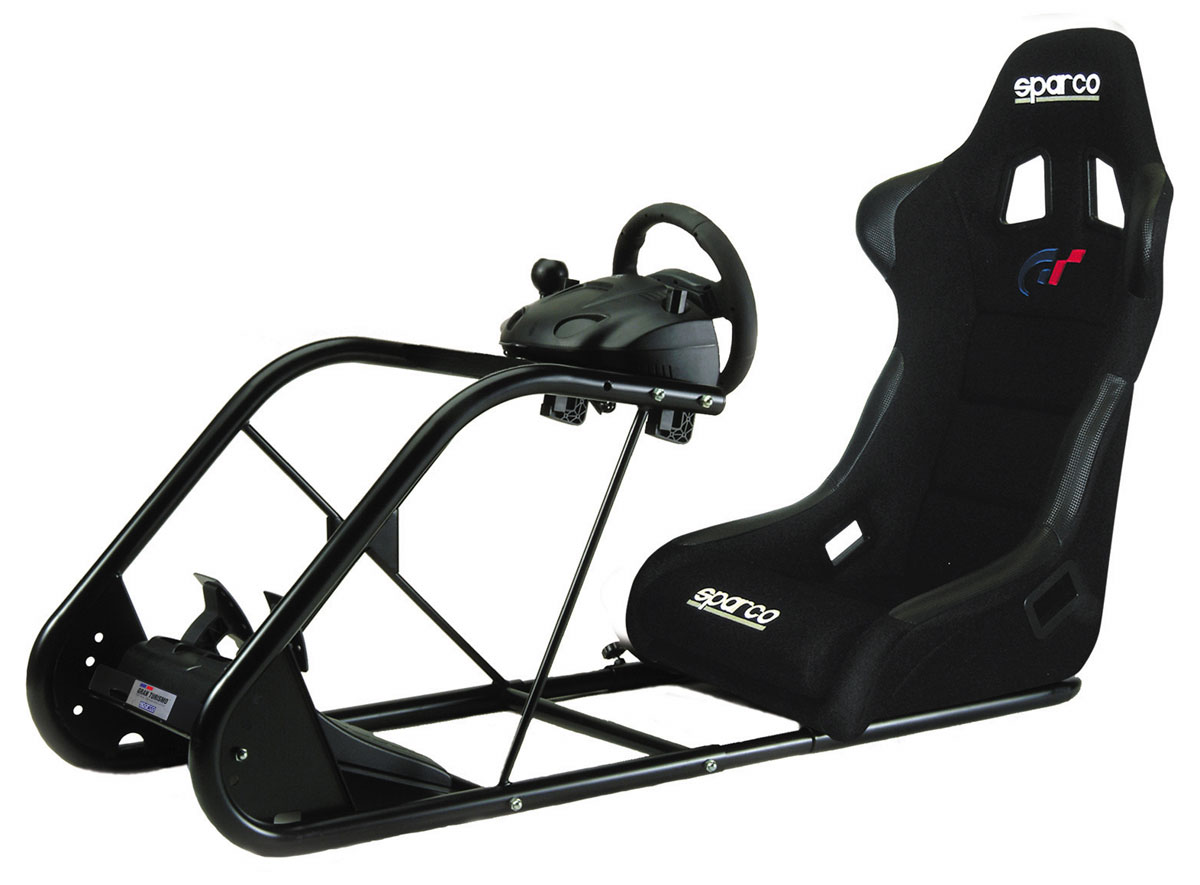
A sim racing rig consisting of a frame, chair, wheel and pedals

In sim racing, the seat, wheel and pedals are often held together via a sturdy frame made from aluminum profiles or similar, such that the parts do not move from each other during. This provides more stiffness and better performance, and can particularly be of importance when using more powerful sim racing equipment such as high-torque direct-drive sim racing wheels or heavy-duty load cell pedals of which some regularly can be used with 100 kg of force. The frame as such becomes the "skeleton" of which the other components of the rig is attached to. Other accessories such as a gear stick or hand brake can also be attached to the same frame as the seat, wheel and pedals.

Many high-quality frames are made of aluminum profiles with T-slots which are modular and can provide good position adjustability for the seat, wheel and pedals. Only the frame itself can in many cases weigh more than 50-60 kg, and can occupy a floor area of 1.4 meter length by 66 cm wide. In addition, extra area is needed for the seat and monitors, and with a common three-monitor setup the whole rig can easily span an area of 1.4 m × 1.4 m.

The height of the rig depends on amongst other things the seating style. A distinction is often made between the upright and more versatile GT or sports car style seating on one hand, and the lower and more specialized near-lying Formula One style seating. Rig heights can vary, but the two mentioned types can for example give total rig height above the floor at 120 cm (GT) or 80 cm (F1). The GT style is more common for several reasons:

- With a GT style seating, the bum is placed higher than the pedals (for example the seating surface can be placed 10 cm to 30 cm higher than the bottom of the pedals), which facilitates for a more comfortable and effective driving posture with between 90 and 120 degrees of bend in the elbows and knees. This provides for a flexible seating position easing manipulation of the steering inputs to the simulator, and is more effective and comfortable to driver over prolonged period.
- Contrary to a GT style seating, and F1 rig is typically shaped such that the bum is placed lower than the pedals (for example, the seating surface can be placed 15 cm lower than the bottom of the pedals). In real life, the Formula One seating style is a result of the pursuit for better aerodynamics and lower center of gravity, which are important in real-life racing cars, but do not aid in a comfortable driving posture. Driving in a F1 style posture can be tiring after a while.

Some lower cost wheels have table clamps for mounting to a desk, and loose pedals with rubber feet to provide some kind of friction against a carpet or floor such that the wheel and pedals can be used without a frame. However, even with such inexpensive equipment, a frame can provide considerably more stiffness and rigidity and give a better driving experience. There are also more inexpensive collapsible racing chairs with attachment points for pedals and a wheel. This provides an improvement over loose equipment, and takes up less storage space.

== See also ==
- flight stick
- Gaming chair
- Sim racing wheel
- Simulator pedal
