= Assetto Corsa =

Racing video game by Kunos Simulazioni

- Cover art featuring the Ferrari 458 Italia GT3
- Developer: Kunos Simulazioni
- Publishers: Kunos Simulazioni (PC); 505 Games (PS4, Xbox One)
- Platforms: Microsoft Windows; PlayStation 4 Xbox One
- Release: Microsoft Windows: WW: December 19, 2014; PS4, Xbox One: EU: August 26, 2016; NA: August 30, 2016; iOS: WW: August 31, 2021
- Genre: Sim racing
- Modes: Single-player, multiplayer

Assetto Corsa (Italian for "Race Setup") is a 2014 sim racing video game developed by Italian developer Kunos Simulazioni. It is designed with an emphasis on a realistic racing experience with support for extensive customization and moddability. The game was first released via Steam's Early Access program on November 8, 2013, and was officially released on December 19, 2014.

On 3 June 2015, publisher 505 Games in partnership with Kunos Simulazioni announced that they would bring the game to Xbox One and PlayStation 4 in 2016 and, on 20 January 2016, revealed a release date of 22 April 2016. On 24 February 2016, it was announced that the console release was delayed to 3 June 2016. 505 Games and Kunos Simulazioni announced another delay and a new release date for the console versions on 6 May 2016. The game was released on consoles on 26 and 30 August 2016 in Europe and North America respectively. A second game, Assetto Corsa Competizione, was released in May 2019, while the third installment, Assetto Corsa EVO, launched into early access in January 2025.

== Gameplay ==
Assetto Corsa is a racing simulation that attempts to offer a realistic driving experience with a variety of road and race cars through detailed physics and tyre simulation on race tracks recreated through laser-scanning technology. It supports a range of peripherals like mouse, keyboard, wheels, gamepads, triple-displays, TrackIR head tracking and VR head-mounted displays as well as Nvidia 3D Vision and professional motion systems. The software can be extended through modded third-party content.

The game allows to adjust realism settings fitting the experience of the player, ranging from artificial to "factory" or entirely disabled assists. A variety of session modes and session settings are available for offline and online play. Offline campaign, special events, custom championships, hotlap, quick race, drift, drag, and race weekend sessions can be played alone or against AI. A server manager tool allows to create servers for online sessions, LAN sessions are also supported.

When joining an offline/online session, players can adjust their car through a setup interface. Depending on the car this includes gear ratios, tyre compounds, tyre pressures, fuel, suspension settings like anti-roll bars, wheel rates, ride height, packer rates, travel range, damper settings like bump stops and rebounds, heave dampers, alignment setting, drivetrain settings for differential lock and pre-load, hybrid settings, adjustments to the wings, brake bias, brake power, engine limiter, etc. Assists like traction control and ABS, turbo boost, KERS, ERS, and engine brake settings and brake bias can be adjusted on the fly through hot-keys.

The in-game HUD consists of multiple "virtual desktops" that allow to manually place a wide variety of "apps" anywhere on screen, and the selection can be expanded through custom apps written in the Python language. The API allows access to the session and simulation data through external LCDs or phone apps and the simulation exports telemetry data in a compatible format for professional data analysis software.

== Official tracks ==
This is a list of all 15 official race tracks; 4 DLCs are marked with (*). Some of these tracks are available in different layouts (45 layouts in total).

Track	Country	# of layouts	Layouts
Circuit de Spa-Francorchamps	Belgium	1	
Nürburgring	Germany	4	GP, GP (GT), Sprint, Sprint (GT)
Nürburgring Nordschleife *	Germany	4	Normal, Endurance, Endurance Cup, Touristenfahrten
Autodromo Internazionale del Mugello	Italy	1	
Autodromo dell'Umbria (Magione)	Italy	1	
Autodromo Enzo e Dino Ferrari (Imola)	Italy	1	
Autodromo Nazionale di Monza	Italy	4	GP, 1966 Full Course, 1966 Junior Course, 1966 Road Course
Autodromo Piero Taruffi (Vallelunga)	Italy	3	Normal, Classic, Club
Trento-Bondone Hill Climb	Italy	1	
Drag Strip (fictional)	Italy	5	200 m, 400 m, 500 m, 1000 m, 2000 m
Drift (fictional)	Japan	1	
Circuit Park Zandvoort	Netherlands	1	
Red Bull Ring *	Austria	2	GP, Short
Circuit de Barcelona-Catalunya *	Spain	2	GP, Moto
Brands Hatch *	United Kingdom	2	GP, Indy
Silverstone Circuit	United Kingdom	4	GP, International, National, 1967
Black Cat County (fictional)	United States	3	Normal, Long, Short
Highlands (fictional)	United Kingdom	4	Normal, Drift, Long, Short
Laguna Seca Raceway	United States	1	

== Development ==
Kunos Simulazioni built Assetto Corsa on the experience acquired with the development of netKar Pro and Ferrari Virtual Academy. The studio acquired practical knowledge working closely to real motorsport as their R&D office was located at the time on Vallelunga Circuit, Italy. The game includes renditions of international circuits (surveyed using both traditional and laser scanning technology) as well as many cars from global car brands, ranging from everyday road cars to racing prototypes and historic vehicles. As in case of most car simulators, the car performance is one of the most important factors, including the torque and power in function of the RPM.

Assetto Corsa started development in 2010 with a driving school project for Automobile Club d'Italia. In 2011, Kunos moved to developing the game in Unity engine, however, due to constraints of external integrability (i.e. not being modding friendly) and due to long loading times, they decided to leave it be and at the end of 2011 built a new engine completely in-house from the ground up instead.

The game is coded in multiple programming languages. C++ is used for the simulation part and Go for the multiplayer server. The user interface and launcher core is coded in C#, but the interface frontend in HTML to allow users to create interface modifications. Python can be used for developing plugins for retrieving simulation data in real time. APIs used are DirectX 11 for graphics, FMOD for sound, and ODE for collision detection and rigid body physics.

=== PC demo ===
The Assetto Corsa Technology Preview was a playable benchmark that was released on 22 February 2013. It offered one car, Lotus Elise SC, and one track, Autodromo dell'Umbria in Magione, Italy, as well as two playing modes, free practice and time attack. The preview's main purpose was to allow users to get their first taste of the engine, test it, and report feedback. The preview required the player to own a netKar Pro license.

=== PC early access ===
Assetto Corsa was greenlit on Steam Greenlight on 13 June 2013. The game was released through Steam's Early Access program on 8 November 2013. This service allows developers to release a functional but yet incomplete product, such as beta versions, to allow users to buy the title and help provide funding, testing and feedback towards the final production. Through the Early Access programme the game received updates roughly every two weeks, adding new and improving existing content and features.

=== PC release ===
The Release Candidate, a feature complete version of the game, was released on 15 October 2014. The final version, following general bugfixing and performance optimizations, was released on 19 December 2014. The game continues to receive free updates, new features, and paid DLC with additional content such as new cars and tracks.

=== Console release ===
In May 2015, the PlayStation 4 and Xbox One version of the game was announced. It is published by 505 Games and was released after delays on 26 and 30 August 2016 in Europe and North America respectively. Marco Massarutto, co-founder and executive manager of Kunos Simulazioni, states that the physics model of the console version is identical to the PC version and the rendering and physics engines had to be rebuilt to better utilise multi-threading—the performance targets for the PlayStation 4 are 1080p, 60FPS, with the Xbox One "matching the PS4 as closely as possible". The console version of the game received an entirely new UI optimised for use with a gamepad.

On February 14, 2018, a new release called Ultimate Edition, containing all previously available DLC, was announced for consoles. This edition was then released on April 20, 2018.

=== Mobile release ===
In August 2021, a mobile port of the game was announced. It was officially released for iOS devices (iPhone and iPad) on August 31 and it was entrusted to Digital Tales.

=== Free content updates ===
Since release out of the Steam Early Access program the game content of the PC version has been expanded with several free updates. The later released console versions receive the same content with a slightly different release schedule. On 24 December 2014, shortly after the game's release, patch 1.0.1 brought the Ruf brand to the game in form of the 1987 CTR Yellowbird.

Patch 1.2 on 31 July 2015 saw the introduction of Circuit Park Zandvoort, and added the Alfa Romeo MiTo QV, Audi Sport Quattro, Lamborghini Miura P400 SV, Nissan R35 GT-R NISMO and Toyota GT86 to the game.

With patch 1.5 on 31 March 2016 a major free update was released for the game, bringing a new fictional USA-themed location named Black Cat County, available in 3 layouts, two additional Nürburgring layouts, an additional Nürburgring Nordschleife endurance layout, the Vallelunga classic layout, new drag strip distances, a graphical rework of most existing circuits in the game, as well as the introduction of the Abarth 595 SS (including variants), Chevrolet Corvette C7 Stingray, and the 2015 Ford Mustang.

=== Downloadable content ===
The Dream Pack 1 downloadable content (DLC) was released on 11 March 2015, adding a number of new car licences to the game: Alfa Romeo 155 V6 Ti, Alfa Romeo 4C, Alfa Romeo GTA, BMW M235i Racing, Chevrolet Corvette C7.R, McLaren F1 GTR, McLaren P1, Mercedes 190E Evo II, Sauber-Mercedes C9, and Nissan GT-R Nismo GT3. It also introduces the laserscanned Nürburgring Nordschleife in three different layouts that took over two years to make.

The Red Pack DLC was released on 14 July 2016, introducing the Maserati brand and the laserscanned Red Bull Ring in GP and National layouts to the game, containing seven cars like the Ferrari 488 GT3, Ferrari F138, Ferrari SF15-T, Lamborghini LP 750-4 Aventador SV, the classic GP six-/twelve-cylinder Maserati 250F and 250F T2 monoposto and the Maserati GranTurismo MC GT4. The introduction of modern Formula 1 extends the simulated hybrid systems in the game with the complex Energy Recovery Systems (ERS) utilised in modern F1.

On 25 October 2016, Kunos released the Porsche Pack Volume 1 DLC. It introduces the Porsche brand to the game together with seven new cars: the 718 Cayman S, the 1974 911 Carrera RSR 3.0, the 2015 911 Carrera S, 917/30 Spyder, 918 Spyder Weissach, 935/78 "Moby Dick", and Cayman GT4 Clubsport.

The Ferrari 70th Anniversary Celebration Pack DLC, released on 19 September 2017, added seven new Ferrari cars: the 250 GTO, 288 GTO, 312/67, 330 P4, 812 Superfast, and the F2004, as well as a community-voted seventh car from Ferrari's history. After receiving over 30,000 votes in total, the result of the poll to be included in the DLC is the 2017 Ferrari SF70H with 15.39% of the votes.

=== Virtual reality support ===
Preliminary VR support for the Oculus Rift Development Kit 1 was first added in 2013 and support was updated throughout the game's Early Access period.

Work on Oculus support ceased after support for Development Kit 2, with Kunos Simulazioni citing increased difficulty in keeping the latest Oculus SDK's supported while production priorities are focused on updates for the PC version and preparation for the console release, promising "to support VR—and not necessarily only the Oculus Rift—when we will be able to take the time and resources required." In an official community poll on the official support forums, open from 2 to 9 April 2016, "VR support" reached first place with 25% of a total of 4,801 votes.

With the 1.6 update released on 18 May 2016 the development studio implemented pre-Alpha support for the Oculus Rift SDK 1.3, enabling support for the consumer version of the Oculus VR HMD. Thanks to a workaround using the software ReVive this version of the simulator also works with the HTC Vive—official support for the device was confirmed to release at a later date. On 22 March 2017, patch 1.13 added the beta implementation of Vive support through OpenVR.

Assetto Corsa supports many different VR headsets utilizing Oculus runtime or Open VR. Including, but not limited to, Oculus Rift, Oculus Quest, Oculus Quest 2, HTC Vive, Valve Index, and many more.

== Modding ==
The game was designed to support extensive modification and creation of additional cars and tracks by users themselves. A special WYSIWYG editor, bundled with the game, enables importing of 3D models (in FBX file format) and allows artists to assign properties and material shaders to objects, with an emphasis on ease of use. The editor exports a single game model file and does not allow opening of, or addition of objects to, an already exported file. The game also supports addition of third party widgets and plugins written in Python, C++ and C#, for uses such as telemetry or interface enhancements. The engine's flexibility has allowed Assetto Corsa to be played far beyond its life cycle, with the game setting record player counts on Steam ten years after its release.

One of the most prominent mods for the game is an engine extension by modder Ilja Jusupov called "Custom Shaders Patch", implementing numerous graphical enhancements, new features, physics tweaks, and bug fixes not present in the original game.

While Assetto Corsa has become a hub for a wide range of players, including artists and designers, to showcase and, in some cases, monetize their work, it has conversely facilitated widespread content ripping, with users porting assets from other first-party racing titles into the game. Kunos Simulazioni co-founder Marco Massarutto has publicly acknowledged and condemned the practice, with it influencing the development of the game's successor Assetto Corsa EVO with regards to modding as a feature.

== Hardware ==
On 10 April 2015, Kunos Simulazioni announced a partnership with RSeat Ltd. and France Simulateur SARL and the release of an Assetto Corsa-branded full simulation rig named RSeat RS1 Assetto Corsa Special Edition, supporting a wide range of peripherals and capable of being upgraded with full motion systems. The Steam version of Assetto Corsa is included in this package.

== Reception ==
Reception

Aggregate scores
Aggregator	Score
GameRankings	PC: 85% PS4: 65% XONE: 58%
Metacritic	PC: 85/100; PS4: 73/100; XONE: 64/100

Review scores
Publication	Score
Destructoid	4/10 (PS4)
Eurogamer	9/10 (PC)
GamesMaster	69/100 (PS4)
IGN	9.5/10 (PC)
PlayStation Official Magazine – Australia	7/10 (PS4)
PlayStation Official Magazine – UK	7/10 (PS4)
PC PowerPlay	8/10 (PC)

Assetto Corsa (PC) received mostly positive reviews. It received "generally positive" reviews from critics. The PC version received an aggregated score of 85/100 rating on Metacritic, with the PS4 version receiving 73/100.

Eurogamer.net, in its January 2015 PC review, writes that "Kunos' solution is simple, elegant and—if there's any common sense knocking around other developers—surely a standard for all driving games that follow in its wake" and concludes that "Assetto Corsa's laser focus on the driving experience works wonders—and when it comes to replicating that simple, brilliant pleasure, there's no other game right now that does it better"; it awarded the game a score of 9/10 and a silver 'Recommended' label. Eurogamer.net's Italian sister-website Eurogamer.it reviewed the game earlier on 16 October 2014 and awarded it the same score of 9/10.

Justin Sutton of American automobile news site Motorsport.com, writes that "Assetto Corsa is a beautiful game, the result of laser-scanning accuracy and precision, with good sound, AI that needs improving, and a multiplayer community that could really benefit from more clean racers. The mods available for the sim, however, take it to the next level", concluding: "If you're looking for a good sim to enter the sim-racing community with, Assetto Corsa is a fantastic choice that will provide an incredible number of cars and tracks for a one-time payment."

On 15 May 2015, Rock, Paper, Shotgun's Tim Stone put Assetto Corsa on place five of its "The 25 Best Simulation Games Ever Made" list. The game has been regularly featured in the website's simulation and wargame-focused The Flare Path section.

In its 2015 review of the PC version, British automobile magazine Evo highlights Assetto Corsa's physics, writing that "some aspects that other games barely touch on, such as tyre deformation and accurate friction models, are impressively accurate", and concludes: "What Assetto Corsa neatly demonstrates is the variety available in the racing simulation game market, and also developers’ different interpretations of the term ‘simulation’. [...] While lacking in vehicle and circuits right now, Assetto Corsa is one of the best simulations we’ve tried". However, in September 2016, The PlayStation Official Magazine said "as an actual racing game, it's rather sedate, feature-light and often unfairly difficult."

Declaring 2015 as "Year of the racing game", British automobile magazine TopGear's Mike Channell writes: "Released at the tail end of 2014, Assetto Corsa is a spectacularly tactile PC sim that offers up a garage full of cars that will tug at your very loins". In a preview of the upcoming console version in January 2016, TopGear writes that "Assetto Corsa might not have the same storied history as Forza or Gran Turismo, but it's established its brilliance on PC already and as with just about everything built by Italians it's forged with all-consuming passion."

Previewing the game for the upcoming console release RedBull.com's, Curtis Moldrich states that "although we didn't get a chance to play the game with a controller, with a steering wheel at least, Assetto Corsa is a revolution. By embracing reality and modelling it perfectly, Assetto Corsa actually makes for a more entertaining game. Throw in super-realistic sound, solid AI and smooth graphics, and Assetto Corsa could well be the benchmark that Gran Turismo Sport, Project CARS 2 and Forza 7 will have to beat." In contrast, GamesMaster said that it is "lacking in most areas compared to its rivals."

As of May 2016, the game is ranked among the most played racing sims on the Steam platform. There are more than 900 active multiplayer servers for Assetto Corsa and the game is used by several leagues around the world. On racedepartment.com, more than 9,000 modifications have been published for the title until October 2018.

Kunos Simulazioni has stated since game release that, due to engine limitations and due to the small size of the software developer, the game would not support features such as wet weather conditions, rain, night racing, or multi-class racing compatible AI. According to simulation engineer James Dover, the game does deliver in terms of graphics, but he reckons its physics engine "lacks seriousness". As of May 2016, various updates to the game solved or improve upon many of the listed issues like AI, netcode, physics, and single player AI pitstops, and the game continues being updated in all areas with regular cadence.

The game reached number eight in the UK sales chart. It got to number three in Australia and number five in New Zealand. The game has sold a total of 1.4 million copies.
