= Simulator pedal =

Type of game controller used for driving or flight simulation

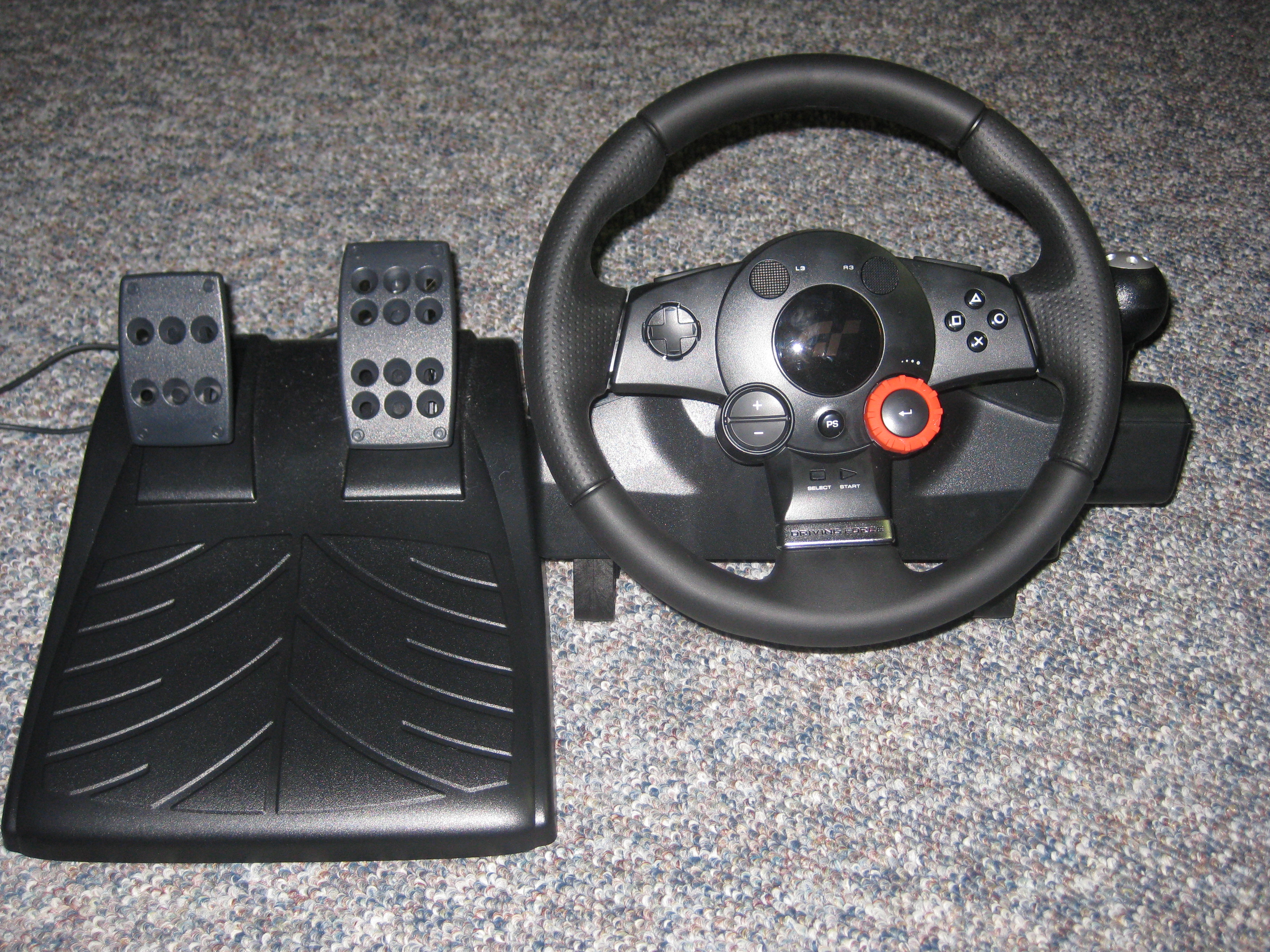
A Logitech Driving Force GT combo of a sim steering wheel and pedals (2011)

A simulator pedal, sim pedal or gaming pedal is a pedal used in a simulator for entertainment or training. Common examples are throttle and brake pedals for driving simulators, and rudder pedals for flight simulators. For minimum latency, they are often connected to a computer or gaming console via cabling, for example with USB-C.

For video game entertainment such as arcade games or for beginner sim racers, inexpensive pedals are often used, while for serious training and professional sim racing there are more expensive models, and these are sometimes coupled with a direct-drive sim racing wheel.

Although new sim racers are often more concerned with the steering wheel, many experienced racers recommend putting more money into the pedals (and a sturdy sim rig) and rather purchase a less expensive steering wheel if one has to prioritize.

== Sensors ==
The transducer or sensor on inexpensive pedals is often based on potentiometers or Hall effect sensors, while more expensive pedals use load cells (or sometimes load cells combined with hydraulics). Gaming pedals used with computer games are basically electronic brake-by-wire pedals and electronic throttle-by-wire pedals.

== Mechanics ==
The pedals can be designed with complex geometries consisting of arms, springs and dampers with the intention of creating a "natural" feel with progressive and repeatable resistance so that the driver can perform more consistently in competitions. This is particularly important for the brake pedal in sim racing. For some affordable pedals, there are upgrade kits and homemade solutions available with the aim of imitating the feeling one can get with more expensive pedals.

== Haptics ==
In 2022, the Finnish company Simucube launched ActivePedal, the world's first mass-produced simpedal with haptic technology. Co-founder and technical director Tero Kontkanen from Simucube claims that such active pedals in the long run will have a greater impact on sim racing than direct-driven sim racing wheels.

Haptic pedals can be used to give the driver of a car simulator valuable feedback (in the form of force-feedback and vibrators) based on telemetry from what happens to the car's tires against the ground in the simulator. Haptics are primarily useful for the brake pedal. In addition to giving the ability to sense the transition from static to kinetic friction when skidding, haptic pedals can also be used to simulate pulsations in the pedals of cars with anti-lock brakes or traction control.

== Automotive pedals ==
The most common sim racing pedal setup is two asymmetric pedals with a brake pedal and an accelerator pedal. A clutch pedal can often be purchased separately as an optional extra, and can, for example, be relevant the driver desires to realistically drive historic racing cars with a manual gear stick. Some inexpensive pedal kits come with three pedals, and some sim steering wheel bundles also come with pedals included. A clutch pedal is rarely necessary in sim racing.

In case the seat and cockpit setup is to mimic a close to lying Formula style seating position it can be beneficial to be able to mount the pedals inverted such that the pedals hang downwards instead of coming up from the floor as normal. Many pedals can easily be inverted by mounting them upside down, but not all pedal sets can be inverted. As for the more common upright GT style seating position, which is more comfortable for longer sessions and therefore will be more relevant for most drivers, it is of less importance whether the pedal can be inverted or not.

== Flight pedals ==
Rudder pedals for flight simulators simulate rudder control (and possibly toe brakes), and come in pairs with one pedal for each foot. The pedals are interconnected and synchronized so that one pedal flips out when the other is pressed in.

== Bicycle pedals ==
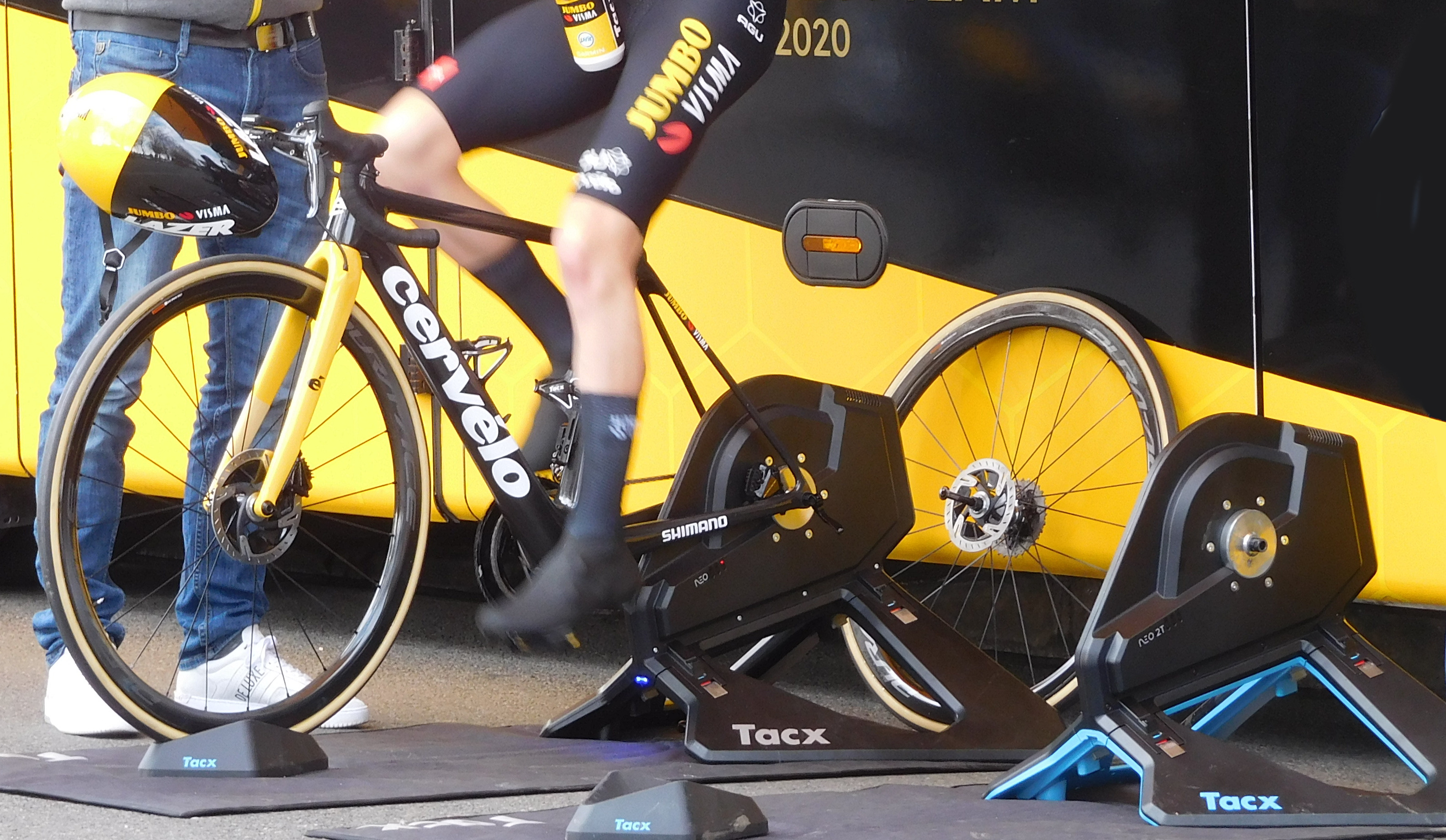
Sam Oomen from Team Jumbo-Visma on a smart trainer at the 2021 Paris–Nice

There are indoor exercise bikes that can be used for computer games. Alternatively, some bicycle trainers have sensors to measure the rider's performance, including power (watts), cadence(r/min), virtual speed and heart rate, and these measurements can be connected to software or apps so that one can compete against oneself in a cycling game or against other riders over the internet. Analysis of the measurements can also help with the cyclist's training.

== See also ==
- Esports
- Gaming chair
- Joystick or yoke
- Rudder pedals, a foot-operated interface for steering the rudder of an airplane
- Sim racing wheel
- Throttle pedal or throttle lever
