= Rudder pedal =

Aircraft rudder control interface

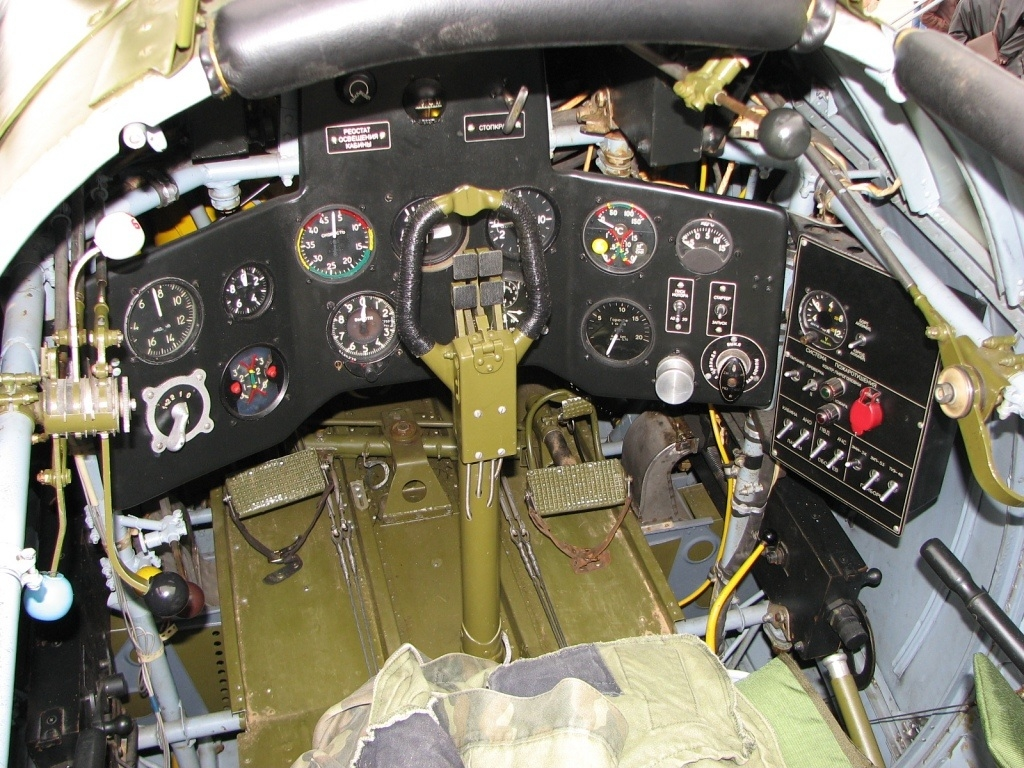
Green pedals in the floor of a Polikarpov I-15

A rudder pedal is a foot-operated aircraft flight control interface for controlling the rudder of an aircraft. The usual set-up in modern aircraft is that each pilot has a pedal set consisting of a pair of pedals, with one pedal for each foot. Each right and left pedal works together so that one pedal pops out when the other is depressed, and convention is that the rudder rotates in the same direction as the arm connecting the two rudder pedals. For example, if a pilot presses the left rudder pedal forward, rotating the arm clockwise, the rudder will also rotate clockwise, deflecting airflow at the tail to the left and yawing the plane to the left. Similarly, if the pilot presses the right rudder pedal forward, the plane will yaw to the right.

In aircraft with duplicate control systems (such as trainer aircraft, transport aircraft and airliners), for example with fly-by-wire, the pedal sets of both pilots are linked together so that the other pilot can seamlessly take over. On most modern aircraft, the wheel brakes are activated by pressing down on the top of the rudder pedals, such brakes are therefore called toe brakes. In order for pilots of different heights to have an ergonomic sitting position, the position of some pedal sets can be adjusted.

== See also ==
- Autobrake, automatic wheel-based hydraulic brake system for airplanes
- Simulator pedals, used in flight simulators
- Tiller, a lever used to steer a vehicle without a wheel
