= Assetto Corsa EVO =

Upcoming sim racing racing video game

- Developer: Kunos Simulazioni
- Publishers: Kunos Simulazioni (PC); 505 Games
- Platform: Windows
- Release: 16 January 2025 (early access)
- Genre: Sim racing
- Modes: Single-player, multiplayer

Assetto Corsa EVO (shorthand for "evoluzione", Italian for "race setup", "evolution") is an upcoming sim racing video game developed by Italian developer Kunos Simulazioni and published by 505 Games. The game was released as a Steam Early Access title on 16 January 2025. It is the third installment in the Assetto Corsa series following Assetto Corsa Competizione.

== Gameplay ==
Assetto Corsa EVO is a racing simulation that attempts to offer a realistic driving experience with a variety of cars featuring detailed physics simulation and race tracks built with laser scanning technology. The game features a variety of different modes for offline play, including Single Player, Practice, Quick Race, Driving Academy, Special Events, Hotstint, and Test Drive. The Driving Academy is a mode in which players "improve and earn licenses to unlock faster cars and special events."

A major feature set to appear in the game, and a core component of Assetto Corsa EVO's unique selling proposition, is the inclusion of a laser scanned 1,600 km^{2} open world environment based in Germany's Eifel mountain range region with the tourist layout of the Nürburgring Nordschleife fully integrated into the free roam map, allowing players to simulate Touristenfahrten sessions. The environment is also set to include a dynamic day-night cycle and seasonal weather.

== Development ==
Kunos Simulazioni developed Assetto Corsa EVO with previous knowledge gained from their previous two racing game installments Assetto Corsa and Assetto Corsa Competizione. The studio returned to a varied car roster format and opted to create a brand new game engine developed in-house, previously focusing solely on GT racing cars and making use of Unreal Engine 4 with Assetto Corsa Competizione. Kunos Simulazioni also considered reintroducing mod support but stated that they would implement the feature differently to prevent users from ripping first-party assets into the game, an issue that became widespread in Assetto Corsa.

=== PC early access ===
In its initial early access release, Assetto Corsa EVO first launched with 5 tracks, 20 cars, and 7 game modes. The tracks at launch included Brands Hatch, Mount Panorama Circuit, Suzuka Circuit, Imola Circuit, and Laguna Seca. Several new tracks and cars have since been added as the early access period has progressed. Immediately after its early access release, Kunos Simulazioni showcased a roadmap for Assetto Corsa EVO, with the studio aiming to fully release the game around Fall 2025; this has since slipped to 2026.

The game received mostly positive reviews despite its lack of features when it first entered early access, however, as the early access period progressed, players grew increasingly frustrated over Assetto Corsa EVO's delayed development and lack of previously outlined content. This included the removal of a dedicated in-depth career mode that included an experience points system and a virtual economy, as the game's structure experienced significant revisions in favour of developing the Driving Academy mode further.

Kunos Simulazioni released a keynote on 7 October 2026 addressing the state of Assetto Corsa EVO; the progression-based system was to be replaced by a sandbox structure prioritizing a deeper physics simulation and native support for mod content, allowing players to tailor their own experience. The game's open world free roam mode on Eifel was also confirmed to be appearing in the game's version 0.10 early access update, nearly two years since the feature was originally slated to come with the game's initial early access launch.
