= Richard Yeo (scientist) =

American scientist

Richard Yeo Swee Chye (Chinese: 楊瑞才) is an American scientist with 17 U.S. patents, best known for his research on disposable diapers.

== Research ==
=== Disposable diapers ===
Yeo co-invented US patent 5,356,626: "Synthetic fecal fluid compound." At the time, Yeo was a senior research scientist working in Roswell, Georgia for Kimberly-Clark, makers of Huggies. He, along with Debra Welchel, developed the material to help the company produce better disposable diapers.

Yeo described his research as:

The technicians have some objection to handling the real thing, a form of biologically hazardous material. Also, it's a bit difficult to obtain, even from infants. We had some fundamental studies of real feces, so we knew what properties we needed. So we developed a synthetic one as close to the real thing as possible. There's no odor -- the technicians wouldn't consent to work on a project like that -- and it can be any color we want.

Yeo conducted extensive research and developed various disposable diapers and personal care products having new features: breathable back sheets, colorful/embossed backsheets, improved BM flaps and better BM containment, better body liners, flushable materials for constructing diapers, odor control, and better tampons.

=== Nafion & fuel cells ===
From 1970-75, Yeo conducted doctorate thesis research on Nafion under the supervision of Adi Eisenberg (Otto Maass Professor of McGill University). In 1977, Yeo and Eisenberg published the earliest peer-reviewed journal article on Nafion.

Yeo continued to publish on Nafion, conducting several comprehensive theoretical studies of the swelling properties of Nafion membrane in various organic and methanol-containing solvents. Yeo found that these perfluorinated ionomer membranes exhibit dual cohesive energy densities. This was referred to by McCain and Covitch as the Yeo Envelope. The commercial importance of Yeo's earliest studies of the unique swelling behavior of Nafion membrane was cited and described by Doyle and Rajendran in the Handbook of Fuel Cells as:

These early swelling studies are the benchmark for a number of more recent studies of the behavior of Nafion membranes when exposed to organic solvents as this topic has become of greater commercial importance with the development of processes for creating Nafion solutions through dissolution in organic solvent mixtures.

== Publications ==
=== Book chapters and editing ===
- "Structure and Properties of Nafion". Modern Aspects of Electrochemistry. Vol. 13. Plenum Press. 1981.
- "Electrochemical Conversion Principles". Comprehensive Treatise of Electrochemistry. Vol. 3. Plenum Press. 1980.
- Structure-property studies of ion-containing polymers.
- "Electrochemical Membrane Technology". Journal of Membrane Science. 13 (3). 1983.
- A Guide to Advanced Level Physics (published in Singapore).
- Ion Exchange: Transport and Interfacial Properties.
- Battery Division, Electrochemical Society; Industrial Electrolytic Division, Electrochemical Society; Energy Technology Group, Electrochemical Society (1982). Transport Processes in Electrochemical Systems.
- Proce, Symposium on Advances in Battery Materials and (1984). Advances in Battery Materials and Processes. Books on Demand. ISBN 9780608046631.
- Eisenberg, A.; Yeager, H. L., eds. (1982). "Solubility Parameter of Perfluorosulfonated Polymer". Perfluorinated Ionomer Membranes. ACS Symposium Series. Vol. 180. American Chemical Society. pp. 65–77. doi:10.1021/bk-1982-0180.ch005. ISBN 978-0-8412-0698-4.
- Eisenberg, A.; Yeager, H. L., eds. (1982). "Applications of Perfluorosulfonated Polymer Membranes in Fuel Cells, Electrolyzers, and Load Leveling Devices". Perfluorinated Ionomer Membranes. ACS Symposium Series. Vol. 180. American Chemical Society. pp. 453–473. doi:10.1021/bk-1982-0180.ch018. ISBN 978-0-8412-0698-4.

=== Articles ===
- "Survey on Separators for Electrochemical Systems," Lawrence Berkeley Laboratory Report # 18937, US Department of Energy, 1984.
- "Electrochemical Separation Processes – Industrial Needs," in Tutorial Lectures inElectrochemical Engineering and Technology – II, American Institute of Chemical Engineers Symposium Series, Ed. By R. Alkire and D-T. Chin, (1983), pg. 205.
- "Membranes and Diaphragms in Industrial Electrochemical Processes," in Proceedings of the Workshop on Electrochemistry Research Needs for Mineral and Primary Materials Processing, Ed. By T. J. O'Keefe and J. Evans, Rolla, Missouri, (1983), pg. 51-58.
- "Novel Hybrid Separators for Alkaline Zinc Batteries," in Proceedings of Advances in Battery Materials and Processes, Ed. By J. McBreen, R. Yeo, and D-T Chin, Electrochemical Society, 1984, pg. 206. & "Research on separators for alkaline zinc batteries" LBL Report.
- "Transport Properties of Nafion Membranes in Electrochemically Regenerative Hydrogen/halogen Cells," J. of Electrochem. Soc.,126, 1682 (1979).
- "Ruthenium-Based Mixed Oxides as Electrocatalysts for Oxygen Evolution in Acid Electrolytes," J. of Electrochem. Soc., 128, no. 9, (1981)
- "Perfluorosulphonic Acid (Nafion) Membrane as a Separator for an Advanced Alkaline Water Electrolyser," J. of Applied Electrochem, 10, 741 (1980).
- "A Hydrogen-Bromine Cell for Energy Storage Applications," J. of Electrochem. Soc., 127, 549 (1980).
- "An electrochemically regenerative hydrogen-chlorine energy storage system: electrode kinetics and cell performance," J. Applied Electrochem., 10, 393 (1981).
- "An Electrochemically Regenerative Hydrogen-Chlorine Energy Storage System: A Study of Mass and Heat Balances, J. Electrochem. Soc., Volume 126, Issue 5, pp. 713-720 (1979)
- "Swelling Properties of Nafion and Radiation Grafted Cation Exchange Membranes," J. Membrane Sci., 9, (1981) 273.
- "Sorption and transport behavior of perfluorinated ionomer membranes in concentrated NaOH solution Electrochimica Acta (December 1985), 30 (12), pg. 1585-1590
- "Corrosion of polymer–concrete composites in hydrochloric acid at elevated temperature," J. Appl. Polym. Sci., 26, 1159 (1981).
- "Gas-Solid Exchange Reactions: Zinc Vapor and Monocrystalline Zinc Telluride," Canadian J. of Chemistry, 49, 1953 (1971).

=== Patents ===
- US patent 6096015, Yeo, Richard; Nolan, Benjamin M & Bononcini, Kenneth et al., "Absorbent Articles having Improved Separator Layer", issued Aug. 1, 2000, assigned to Fibertech Group Inc.
- US patent 5728081, Baer, Samuel C; Yeo, Richard & Noftsier, Ann Marie, "Absorbent Composite Article having Fluid Acquisition Sub-layer", issued Mar. 17, 1998, assigned to Fibertech Group Inc.
- US patent 5695855, Yeo, Richard; Weigert, Brigitte Kay & Crowther, David George, "Durable Adhesive-based Ink-Printed Polyolefin Nonwovens", issued Dec. 9, 1997, assigned to Kimberly-Clark
- US patent 5643662, Yeo, Richard & Creagan, Christopher Cosgrove, "Hydrophilic, multicomponent polymeric strands and nonwoven fabrics made therewith", issued Jul 1997, assigned to Kimberly-Clark
- US patent 5599420, Yeo, Richard; Uitenbroek, Duane G & Powers, Jennifer R, "Patterned embossed nonwoven fabric, cloth-like liquid barrier material and method for making same", issued Feb. 4, 1997, assigned to Kimberly-Clark
- US patent 5533990, Yeo, Richard, "Tampon exhibiting Low Frictional Drag", issued Jul. 9, 1996, assigned to Kimberly-Clark
- US patent 5509913, Yeo, Richard, "Flushable Compositions", issued Apr. 23, 1996, assigned to Kimberly-Clark
- US patent 5503076, Yeo, Richard, "Multi-color Printed Nonwoven Laminates", issued Apr. 2, 1996, assigned to Kimberly-Clark
- US patent 5492751, Butt Sr, Jon R; Creagan, Christopher C & Dunkerly II, Cedric A et al., "Disposable Garment with Improved Containments Means", issued Feb. 20, 1996, assigned to Kimberly-Clark
- US patent 5399174, Yeo, Richard; Uitenbroek, Duane G & Powers, Jennifer R, "Patterned, Embossed Nonwoven Fabric, Cloth-like Liquid Barrier Material", issued Mar. 21, 1995, assigned to Kimberly-Clark
- US patent 5356626, Yeo, Richard & Welchel, Debra, "Synthetic Fecal Fluid Compound", issued Oct. 18, 1994, assigned to Kimberly-Clark
- US patent 5161686, Weber, Mary G; Fitting, Steven W & Weber, Robert E et al., "Odor-Absorbing Web Material and Medical Packages containing the Web Material", issued Nov. 10, 1992, assigned to Kimberly-Clark
- US patent 5122407, Yeo, Richard; Weber, Mary G & Majors, Stephanie R et al., "Odor-removing Cover for Absorbent Pads and Method of Making Same", issued Jun 16, 1992, assigned to Kimberly-Clark
- US patent 4828556, Braun, Ralph V; Garrett, Lance & Phelan, Robert J et al., "Breathable, Multilayered, Clothlike Barrier", issued May 9, 1989, assigned to Kimberly-Clark
- US patent 4758239, Yeo, Richard & Schiffer, Daniel K, "Breathable Barrier", issued Jul. 19, 1988, assigned to Kimberly-Clark
- US patent 4713069, Wang, Kenneth Y & Yeo, Richard, "Baffle having Zoned Water Vapor Permeability", issued Dec. 15, 1987, assigned to Kimberly-Clark
- US patent 4713068, Wang, Kenneth Y & Yeo, Richard, "Breathable Clothlike Barrier having Controlled Structure Defensive Composite", issued Dec. 15, 1987, assigned to Kimberly-Clark
- CA patent 2158790, Yeo, Richard; Geer, Robert Gillette & Sasse, Philip Anthony, "Perimeter barrier seal for personal care absorbent articles and the like", issued 31-Mar-1996, assigned to Kimberly-Clark
- WO patent 9960975, Willis, Jeffrey Michael & Yeo, Richard, "Disposable absorbent articles with BM Containment", issued 2 December 1999, assigned to Kimberly-Clark
- WO patent 9610381, Yeo, Richard & Johns, Eric Mitchell, "Polyvinyl alcohol-treated liner for personal care absorbent articles", issued 11 April 1996, assigned to Kimberly-Clark
