= Assetto Corsa Competizione =

Racing video game by Kunos Simulazioni

- Cover art featuring the Lamborghini Huracán GT3 Evo
- Developer: Kunos Simulazioni (Note: Ported to PlayStation 4 and Xbox One by D3T)
- Publishers: Kunos Simulazioni (PC); 505 Games
- Engine: Unreal Engine 4
- Platforms: Microsoft Windows; PlayStation 4 Xbox One; PlayStation 5 Xbox Series X/S
- Release: Windows; 29 May 2019; PS4, Xbox One; 23 June 2020; PS5, Xbox Series X/S; 24 February 2022
- Genre: Sim racing
- Modes: Single-player, multiplayer

Assetto Corsa Competizione (Italian for "race setup", "competition") is a 2020 sim racing video game developed by the Italian video game developer, Kunos Simulazioni. The game focuses on GT3, GT4, GT2 and one make series cars and is an officially licensed simulation of the GT World Challenge Europe and the Total 24 Hours of Spa covering seasons from 2018 to 2024, and is set to serve as a platform for esports.

Kunos Simulazioni announced the game on 21 February 2018 with a planned Steam Early Access release in summer 2018. On 27 July 2018, a 12 September 2018 early access release date and a roadmap with monthly updates until a full release in Q1 2019 was revealed at the Total 24 Hours of Spa 2018 SRO press conference. It was released out of early access on 29 May 2019. On 11 March 2020 publisher 505 Games and Kunos Simulazioni announced ports for PlayStation 4 and Xbox One which were released on 23 June 2020. Versions for PlayStation 5 and Xbox Series X/S were announced at Gamescom 2021 and were released on 24 February 2022.

== Gameplay ==
Assetto Corsa Competizione is a racing simulator in which players can drive race cars against AI offline or against other players online. It includes offline career, custom championship, custom races and special events gameplay modes as well as online multiplayer, with session types consisting of Free Practice, Hot Lap, Superpole, Hot Stint, Quick Race (one race up to one hour), Sprint Race Weekend (with up to two practice, two qualifying sessions and two races up to one hour in length) and Endurance Race Weekend (with up to two practice, four qualifying sessions and a top-ten superpole, as well as one or two races each one to twenty-four hours in length). Races can be saved and resumed mid-session in offline modes. Offline grids are automatically selected depending on the series and season selected by the player. Alternatively races can be made into single-make sessions, allowing creation of series such as Porsche Carrera Cup, Lamborghini Super Trofeo or Ferrari Challenge. Car selection in multiplayer is free unless determined through server settings. Crossplay is available between PlayStation 5 and Xbox Series X/S. The game features a dynamic weather system that affects track conditions in real time, with rain intensity, sun exposure, and temperature influencing track wetness; track grip also evolves dynamically over a session as rubber and marbles build up from cars driving on the track. Cars are subject to a damage model affecting bodywork, suspension and aerodynamics, along with a dedicated tyre damage system that factors into handling and race strategy, particularly in endurance events. Assetto Corsa Competizione supports virtual reality via SteamVR on PC.

== Development ==
Development of Assetto Corsa Competizione moved from an in-house developed graphics engine used in the studio's previous title Assetto Corsa to Unreal Engine 4 to ensure graphics engine support for night races and realistic weather conditions. With the new engine, an evolution of the tire and aerodynamic physics models used in the previous title, motion capture animations, modern audio solutions and the detailed focus on a single series and class of cars the developer aims to reach a higher standard of driving realism and immersion for the new title. All ten circuits of the 2018 Blancpain GT Series season are said to be reproduced with laser scan technology.

At Nvidia's Gamescom 2018 keynote Assetto Corsa Competizione was announced to be among the first titles to support Nvidia RTX real-time ray tracing and Nvidia Ansel RTX on GeForce 20 series GPUs.

On 12 March 2020 it was revealed that D3T Ltd have been working with Kunos Simulazioni and 505 Games to bring Assetto Corsa Competizione to PlayStation 4 and Xbox One.

=== Free content updates ===
Version 1.1 on 23 October 2019 added new-for-2019 cars and circuits such as the Audi R8 LMS EVO, Lamborghini Huracán GT3 EVO, AMR V8 Vantage GT3, Honda NSX GT3 EVO, Porsche 911 GT3 R (991 II), Circuit Zandvoort and 2019 versions of Circuit de Spa-Francorchamps, Circuit de Barcelona-Catalunya and Silverstone Circuit as part of the 2019 Blancpain GT Series season, as well as the McLaren 720S GT3 as part of the 2019 McLaren Shadow Project Esports competition as a free update to the game.

Version 1.2 on 17 December 2019 added a custom car livery editor.

Versions 1.3.10 on 15 April 2020 and 1.3.12 on 24 April 2020 added liveries in preparation for 2020 season Esports races held in place of cancelled or postponed real-life events.

Version 1.8 released on 24 November 2021 - Highlights include: DLSS Support, BMW M4 GT3, 2021 liveries, open class support and significant physics and tyre model improvements.

=== Downloadable content ===
The Intercontinental GT Pack downloadable content (DLC) was released on 4 February 2020, adding car liveries as well as the circuits Bathurst, Laguna Seca, Kyalami and Suzuka of the 2019 Intercontinental GT Challenge to the game.

A GT4 Pack DLC planned for release in summer 2020 for PC and fall of 2020 for consoles as well as a British GT Pack DLC planned for a winter release have been announced on 11 March 2020.

The BMW M4 GT3 was released in November 2021 as bonus content for the 2021 season

The Challengers Pack adds 5 new cars to the game including: Audi R8 LMS GT3 Evo II (to be driven by Valentino Rossi in 2022), the BMW M2 CS, Ferrari 488 GT3 Challenge Evo, Lamborghini Huracan Super Trofeo EVO 2 and Porsche 911 GT3 Cup. Released 23 March 2022.

The American Track Pack was released on 30 June 2022 featuring three iconic circuits from the USA, namely Circuit of the Americas, Indianapolis Motor Speedway and Watkins Glen.

When the Nürburgring 24 Hours was announced to have been taken into the SRO organized Intercontinental GT Challenge calendar, the Nürburgring Nordschleife - which had been requested by the playerbase for years but was not possible due to licencing - was finally able to be added to the game and on 1 April 2024, the Nürburgring 24hr Pack was added to the game. It featured references to the next Assetto Corsa title.

== Esports ==
As part of a hot-lap competition hosted at the Thrustmaster booth Assetto Corsa Competizione was playable for the first time at E3 2018. During the 2018 Total 24 Hours of Spa weekend a hot-lap competition was hosted in the Pirelli paddock area and included a winners celebration on the circuit podium just when the real race on the circuit concluded, representing the first esports project undertaken by SRO.

On 27 March 2019 SRO announced the new SRO E-Sport GT Series in collaboration with Kunos Simulazioni featuring five rounds and Am, Silver and Pro driver classes for the 2019 season. The first round of the 2019 SRO E-Sport GT Series championship was staged at Autodromo Nazionale Monza during the 2019 Blancpain GT Series Endurance Cup race weekend. The winners were once again crowned on the real podium after the class podiums of the real race.

Assetto Corsa Competizione featured as one of four racing titles in the 2019 McLaren Shadow Project Esports competition, with a qualifier held from 27 October to 7 November and a grand final on 14 December held at the McLaren Technology Centre.

On 20 March 2020, in light of the COVID-19 pandemic and cancelled or postponed motorsport events, SRO Motorsports Group in partnership with Kunos Simulazioni and Ak Informatica announced a SRO E-Sports GT Series Charity Challenge event for 29 March 2020 featuring Autodromo Nazionale di Monza in Assetto Corsa Competizione as well as 90 professional and sim driver entrants, with donations benefiting the COVID-19 Solidarity Response Fund.

On 6 April 2020 SRO America announced an eight-round, thirty-two car entry GT Rivals Esports Invitational, with participating drivers from GT World Challenge America, Pirelli GT4 America, TC America and GT Sports Club America.

On 10 April 2020 SRO Motorsports Group, Kunos Simulazioni and Ak Informatica announced the 2020 SRO E-Sport Championship spanning five rounds, with 49 professional drivers announced to take part.

On 30 June 2022, the FIA announced it had chosen Assetto Corsa Competizione as its platform for the 2022 FIA Motorsport Games Esports Cup after mutually agreeing with Polyphony Digital to temporarily suspend their partnership until the Gran Turismo 7 platform becomes more stable.

== Reception ==
Reception

Aggregate score
Aggregator	Score
Metacritic	PC: 77/100; PS4: 71/100; PS5: 80/100; XBO: 76/100

Review scores
Publication	Score
IGN	6/10
PCGamesN	9/10

According to review aggregator website Metacritic, the PC and PlayStation 5 versions received "generally favorable reviews", while the PlayStation 4 and the Xbox One versions received "generally mixed reviews".

IGN praised Assetto Corsa Competizione for its realistic GT3 racing simulation, improved AI, dynamic weather, detailed car handling, and immersive audio design. However, IGN's review of the Xbox One and PlayStation 4 versions, including testing on the Xbox One X and PlayStation 4 Pro, criticised their technical performance, noting that despite running at 30 frames per second, the game suffered from inconsistent frame pacing, occasional freezes, and significant frame rate drops in menu screens. The review also noted the smaller car and track selection compared with the original Assetto Corsa, as well as multiplayer limitations at launch and issues with controller and racing wheel support.
