= Kunos Simulazioni =

Italian video game developer

Kunos Simulazioni s.r.l.
- Type: Subsidiary
- Industry: Video games
- Founded: 2005
- Headquarters: ACI Vallelunga Circuit, Rome, Italy
- Key people: Marco Massarutto, Stefano Casillo
- Products: netKar Pro; Ferrari Virtual Academy; Assetto Corsa; Assetto Corsa Competizione; Assetto Corsa EVO; Assetto Corsa Rally
- Number of employees: 30
- Parent: Digital Bros

Kunos Simulazioni s.r.l. is an Italian software development studio that specializes in creating driving simulations. Founded in 2005, the company is most known for developing the Assetto Corsa series.

== History ==
The company is headquartered at the ACI Vallelunga Circuit near Rome and was established in 2005 with the goal of developing software for varying needs from solutions for professional racing teams to consumer software.

The studio's fifth title, Assetto Corsa, was released on 19 December 2014 on Microsoft Windows and received critical acclaim upon its release. A console version of Assetto Corsa for PlayStation 4 and Xbox One in partnership with publisher 505 Games was announced in June 2015 and was released in August 2016.

The company was purchased by 505's parent company Digital Bros S.p.A. in 2017. In February 2018, the company announced Assetto Corsa Competizione, a new title with the official Blancpain GT Series licence, which released on 12 September 2018 in the Steam Early Access program. It left early access on 29 May 2019. A console version was released 23 June 2020 for PlayStation 4 and Xbox One.

== Games developed ==
Year	Title	Platform(s)	Ref(s).
2006	netKar Pro	Microsoft Windows	
2007	Marangoni Hill Climb Simulator	Microsoft Windows	
2009	Trofeo Abarth 500	Microsoft Windows	
2010	Ferrari Virtual Academy	Microsoft Windows	
2014	Assetto Corsa	Microsoft Windows, PlayStation 4, Xbox One	
2019	Assetto Corsa Competizione	Microsoft Windows, PlayStation 4, Xbox One, PlayStation 5, Xbox Series X/S	
2025	Assetto Corsa EVO	Microsoft Windows, PlayStation 5, Xbox Series X/S	
2025	Assetto Corsa Rally	Microsoft Windows	
