= Gaming chair =

Chair marketed towards video game players

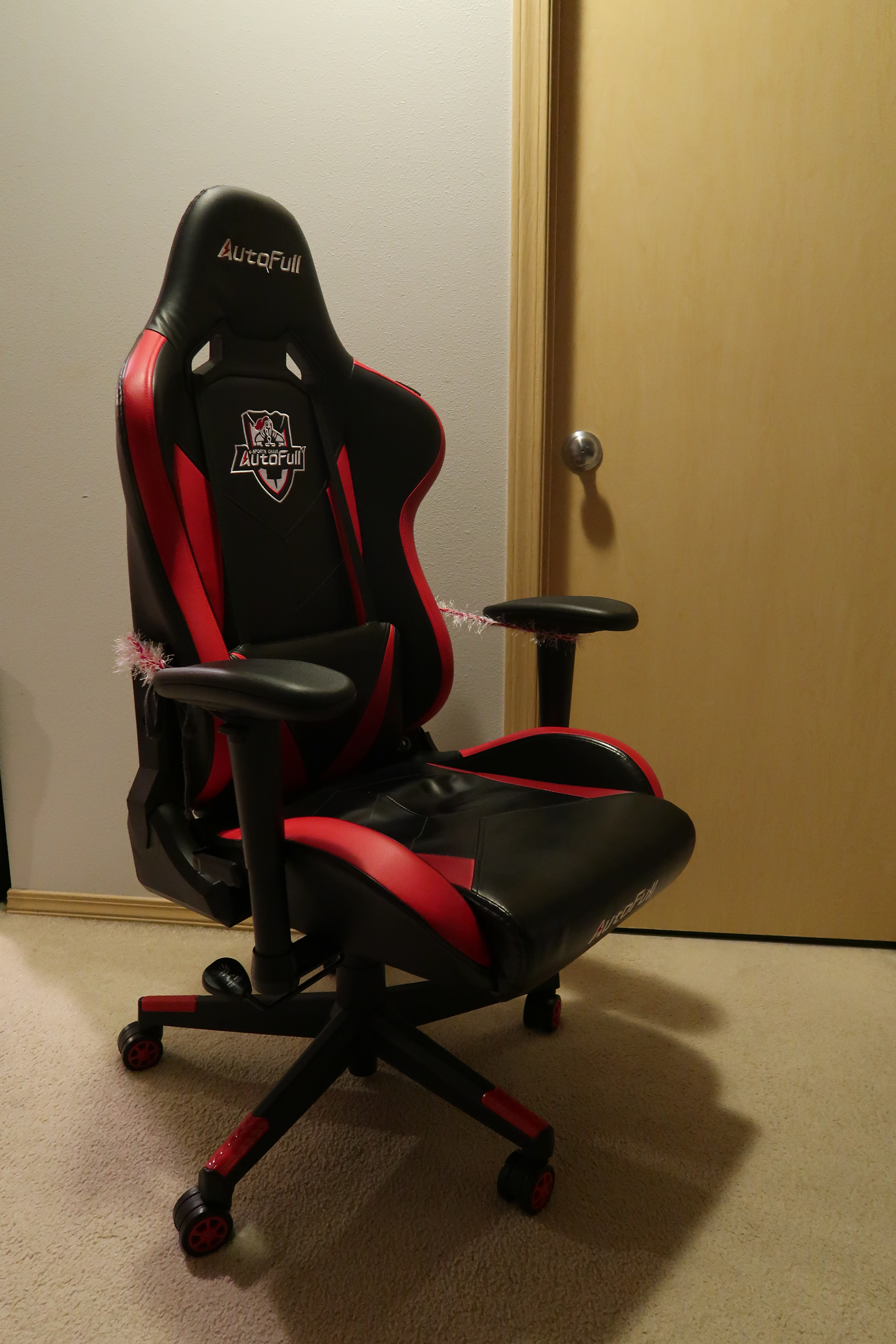
Black and red PC gaming chair

A gaming chair is a type of ergonomic chair marketed towards gamers. They differ from most office chairs in having high backrest designed to support the upper back and shoulders. Like many office chairs, they are customizable: the armrests, back, lumbar support and headrest can all be adjusted for comfort and efficiency. However, there are criticisms of gaming chairs. For example, they tend to be designed and marketed primarily for aesthetics at the expense of having worse ergonomics than modern office chairs.

== History ==
The first ergonomic gaming chairs were produced by DXRacer around 2006, a company that was originally known for producing high-end seats for luxury cars. However, the company began to experience difficulties with Chrysler, which discontinued multiple lines of cars, leading to DXRacer repurposing their stockpile of bucket seats into standalone chairs, marketed towards gamers. In 2008, more companies began to produce gaming chairs.

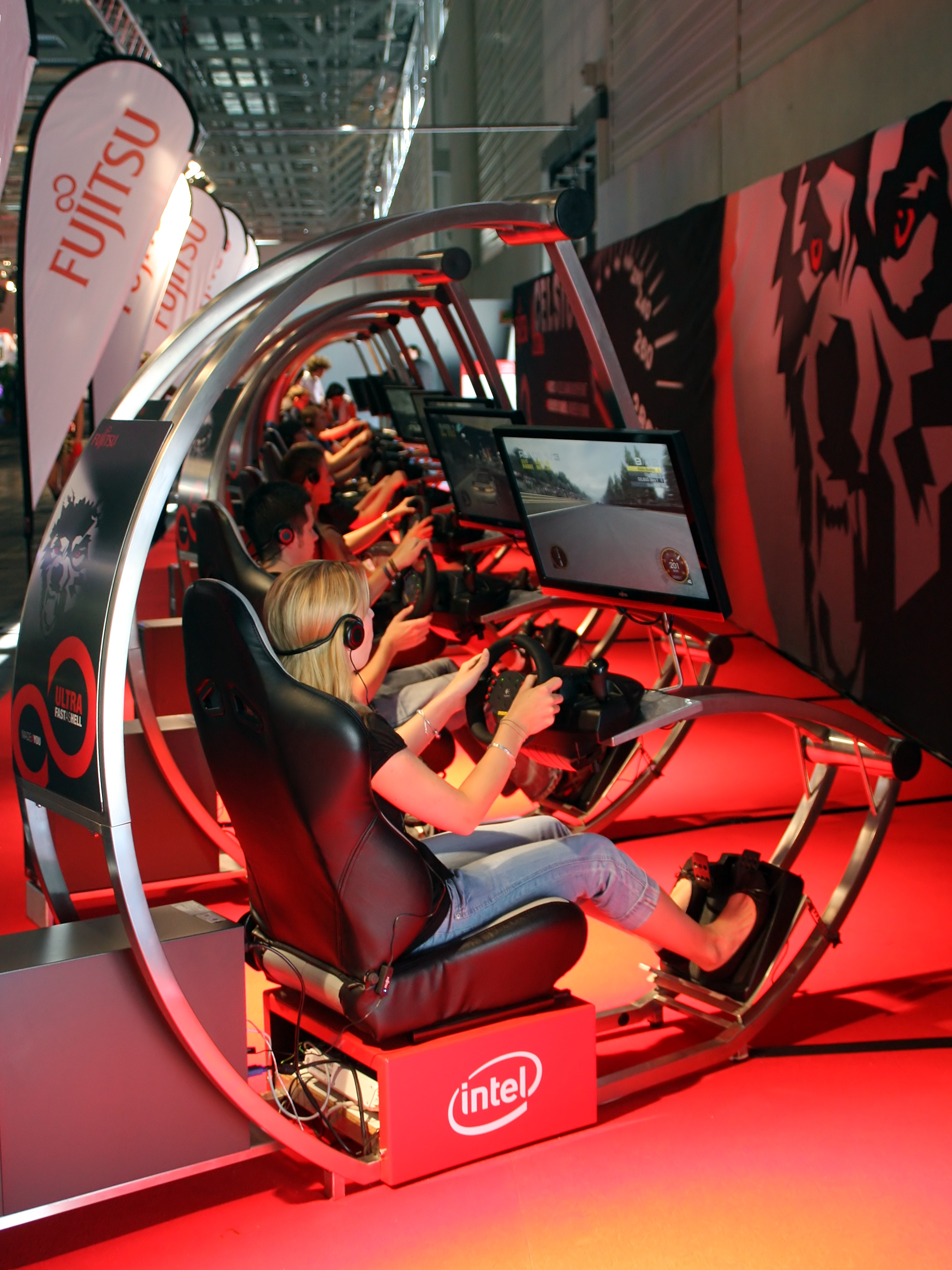
A driving simulator gaming chair set-up at Gamescom 2009

The gaming chair market grew rapidly in 2011 with the advent of the live-streaming platform Twitch and the popularization of esports.

== Types ==
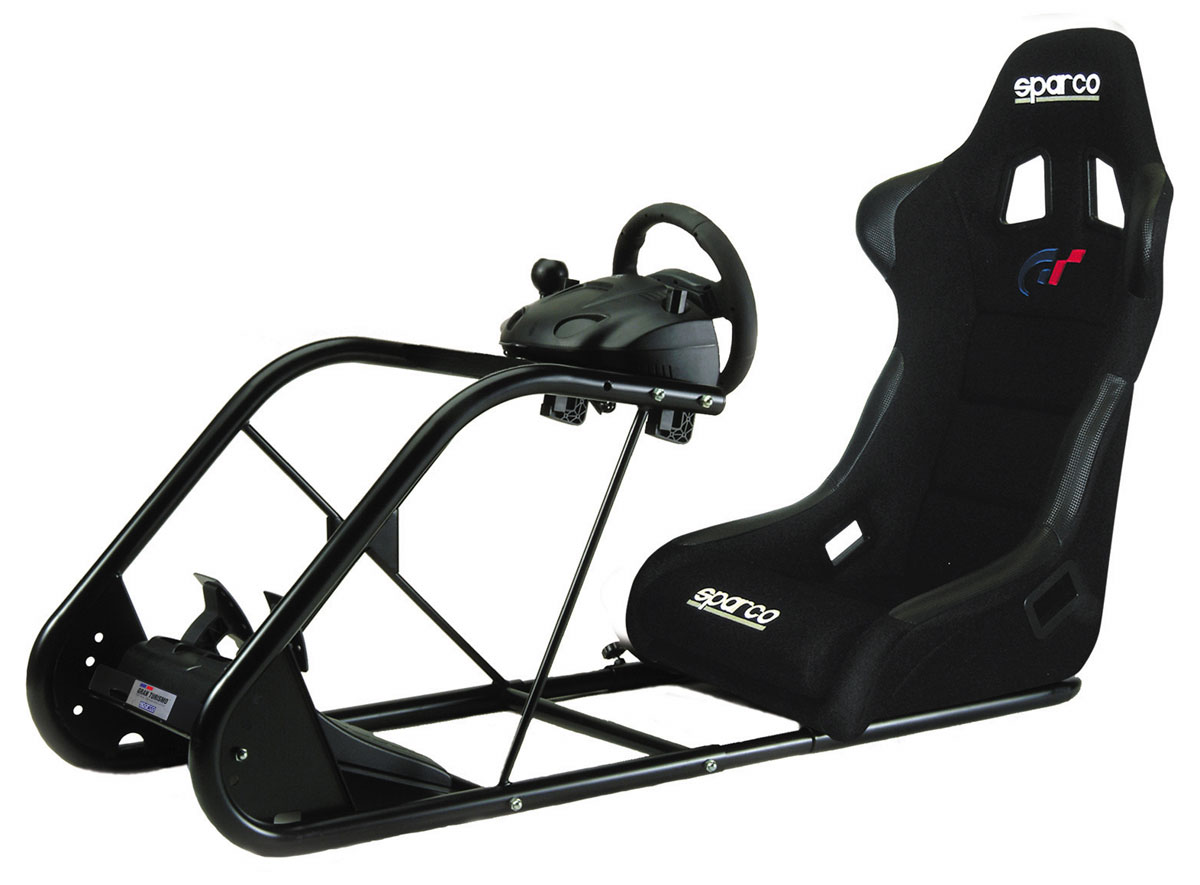
A simulator cockpit chair with a wheel and pedals

There are three main types of gaming chairs. These include PC, platform, and hybrid gaming chairs.

PC gaming chairs
PC gaming chairs are the most popular and well-known. They resemble office chairs, but include a headrest, lumbar support (usually in the form of a cushion), as well as adjustable armrests.

Platform gaming
Console gamers often choose platform gaming chairs for their comfort and design, which are suited for playing in front of a TV. This is because they are meant to rest on the floor and are efficient for television gaming. These chairs normally resemble recliner chairs.

Hybrid gaming chairs
Hybrid gaming chairs share characteristics of both PC and platform gaming chairs. They are often mounted on a swivel base, but still include the shape and style of a platform chair.

Force-feedback gaming chair
These unique gaming chairs feature and utilize haptic technology to add tactile or sustained body‑pressure feedback to match in‑game events and actions.

== See also ==
- Gaming computer
- Motion simulator
- Sim racing
- Simulation cockpit
- A Taxonomy of Office Chairs
