= NetKar Pro =

2006 video game

netKar Pro
- Developer: Kunos Simulazioni
- Publisher: Kunos Simulazioni
- Platform: Windows
- Release: WW: April 10, 2006
- Genre: Sim racing
- Modes: Single player, multiplayer

netKar Pro (also stylized as nKPro) is an online racing simulator that is developed with an emphasis on realism. It provides advanced features such as a complex tire model (visible dirt, tire wear and flat spots, that influence the car's handling) and a fully interactive cockpit such as those seen in flight simulators.

== Gameplay ==
In NetKar Pro, the players can change several settings on each car in the box, such as aerodynamics, brakes, chassis, and transmission. In addition, there are adjustments to the steering wheel angles and air pressure that can be set individually for each tire. If needed, telemetry data can be tracked and assessed at any time. The game offers a control option support for Xbox 360 controller, joysticks and keyboard.

The game comes bundled with 5 tracks, and a further 21 are available to download. Some are real, with the rest being fictional.

== Development and release ==
netKar Pro debuted at a fair held in Lanciano (Italy), February 24–26, 2006. Version 1.0 was released for download on April 10, 2006. Developers worked with companies involved in real car racing such as Sparco (design of steering wheels, helmets, and driving suits), AIM Sportline (official and fully functional AIM data acquisition systems are reproduced in netKar Pro), Cooper/AVON tires, Brembo (braking systems), Beta Tools; they worked also with a Formula Three team Target Racing, with the race engineer Andrea Quintarelli and the driver Riccardo Azzoli (Formula Gloria, Formula Renault and Formula Three).

In the summer of 2006, it was announced that netKar Pro and BallRacing Developments Ltd - developers of hardware and software for the professional race driver and sim racing community - have joined forces "to co-develop the next generation of motorsport simulation".

During Summer 2009, Kunos Simulazioni announced that the next version of netKar Pro, dubbed 1.1, was to be released through a three-stage Public Beta in an effort to iron out all the bugs before reaching gold status, through the help of the community. A new bug reporting feature was added specifically for this purpose.

Beta 1/3 was released in August 2009, and featured:

- A new, streamlined user interface, which included a wizard to make controller setup more straightforward. The redesigned UI abandoned standard Windows UI widgets for the most part and focused on ease of use and a sleek look.
- Support for additional controllers (such as keyboards, mice, and gamepads), abandoning the previous hardcore approach of supporting only USB steering wheels.
- A number of small usability features were introduced, such as automatically switching on the electric and electronic systems of the car upon entry, a step which in the past relied on the driver's intervention, and was known to be baffling for many newcomers, driving them away as a result.
- Many details which made netKar Pro more faithful and realistic were removed, ultimately deemed as too hard on casual sim racers.
- Reworked Force Feedback, improving realism and immersion.

Beta 2/3 came in early September, bringing a new car, the Abarth 500 Assetto Corse, and a new fictional track called Aosta, while at the same time fixing many bugs that affected both the handling of some of the cars and the new UI.

Beta 3/3 was released on 16 January 2010. It contained minor additions, such as audio level control, enhanced chat, tweaked differentials and coast torque, and many usability improvements.

On April 4, a Release Candidate (1.1RC) was leaked to a German site. It was later discovered that Kunos Simulazioni had been busy preparing a free, modified version of the simulator containing only the 500 Assetto Corse, which was to be used in an online competition sponsored by MTV Italia. Marco Massarutto, Product Manager of netKar Pro, who acts as a spokesman for Kunos Simulazioni along with Casillo, replied claiming that the 500 in the MTV package was actually a dumbed-down version of netKar, only intended to be used within the boundaries of the promotional event.

netKar Pro 1.1 Final was supposed to be ready within February, along with the Track Editor, and eventually appeared on April 6, 2010, although without any official statements from Kunos Simulazioni.

The 1.2 revision of netKar Pro is an incremental upgrade initially released to the public on November 12, 2010. Two patches, 1.2B and 1.2C followed shortly has brought:

- A new car, the Formula KS2 based on the real-life Formula GP2.
- Revised tire model.
- Revised differential modeling.
- Improved collision handling and sturdier cars.
- Many usability improvements, minor bug fixes, and some optimizations.

=== Version 1.3 ===
On December 10, 2010, it was revealed that some of the announced planned developments would be released as netKar Pro v.1.3 on Christmas 2010. This update would contain:

- A hill climb track (Trento-Bondone) and a new specific car, the Osella PA-21, which have been the object of much speculation since early 2007, was finally released to the public. Preview versions of this content have been around for a long time in the form of the Marangoni Simulator (which has been recently pulled off the tire manufacturer's site). This update was slated for release after 1.0.3 and subsequently delayed when 1.1 was announced.
- A new car, the Shelby Daytona that was initially spotted on Marco Massarutto's YouTube channel and subsequently announced in the same way.
- Support for rain, with puddles forming on the road

However, it was only on February 12, 2011, that a new Beta 1.3 release saw the light of the day. As of February 2011, v1.3 still hasn't been released.

== Planned developments ==
Kunos has been quiet about further developments. Stefano Casillo, the game's main developer, confirmed the team was committed to continuing development of the 1.x branch to avoid disappointing existing customers, while at the same time pointing out the shortcomings of the technology in the current netKar Pro, which would make it very hard to add new features.
