= Sim racing =

Video game genre

Sim racing is the collective term for racing games that attempt to accurately simulate auto racing, complete with real-world variables such as fuel usage, damage, tire wear and grip, and suspension settings. To be competitive in sim racing, a driver must understand all aspects of car handling that make real-world racing so difficult, such as threshold braking, how to maintain control of a car as the tires lose traction, and how properly to enter and exit a turn without sacrificing speed. It is this level of difficulty that distinguishes sim racing from arcade racing-style driving games where real-world variables are taken out of the equation and the principal objective is to create a sense of speed as opposed to a sense of realism like the Need for Speed series.

Due to the complexity and demands of mimicking real-life driving, racing sims require faster computers to run effectively, as well as a steering wheel and pedals for the throttle and brakes for the immersion. While using a gamepad or even a mouse and keyboard, may suffice for most arcade-style driving games on home systems, it would not provide the same level of immersion and realism as using a racing wheel and pedals. In recent years, many sim racing experiences have been developed for consoles, such as the PlayStation and Xbox. While these games can be played with a controller, it is recommended that players invest in a racing wheel and pedals. With the development of online racing, the ability to drive against human opponents and computer AI offline is the closest many would come to driving cars on a real track. Even those who race in real-world competition use simulations for practice or for entertainment. With continued development of the physics engine software that forms the basis of these sims, as well as improved hardware (providing tactile feedback), the experience has become more realistic.

The sim racing gameplay style has been applied in several video games, such as iRacing, Assetto Corsa and Assetto Corsa Competizione, Gran Turismo, Forza Motorsport, and more.

== History of sim racing ==
=== Arcade simulator era (1982–1989) ===
Prior to the division between arcade-style racing and sim racing, the earliest attempts at providing driving simulation experiences were arcade racing video games, dating back to Pole Position, a 1982 arcade game developed by Namco, which the game's publisher Atari publicized for its "unbelievable driving realism" in providing a Formula 1 experience behind a racing wheel at the time. It featured other AI cars to race against, crashes caused by collisions with other vehicles and roadside signs, and introduced a qualifying lap concept where the player needs to complete a time trial before they can compete in Grand Prix races. It also pioneered the third-person rear-view perspective used in most racing games since then, with the track's vanishing point swaying side to side as the player approaches corners, accurately simulating forward movement into the distance. In a 2007 retrospective review, Eurogamer called it "a simulation down to the core: those dedicated will eventually reap success but most will be deterred by the difficulty".

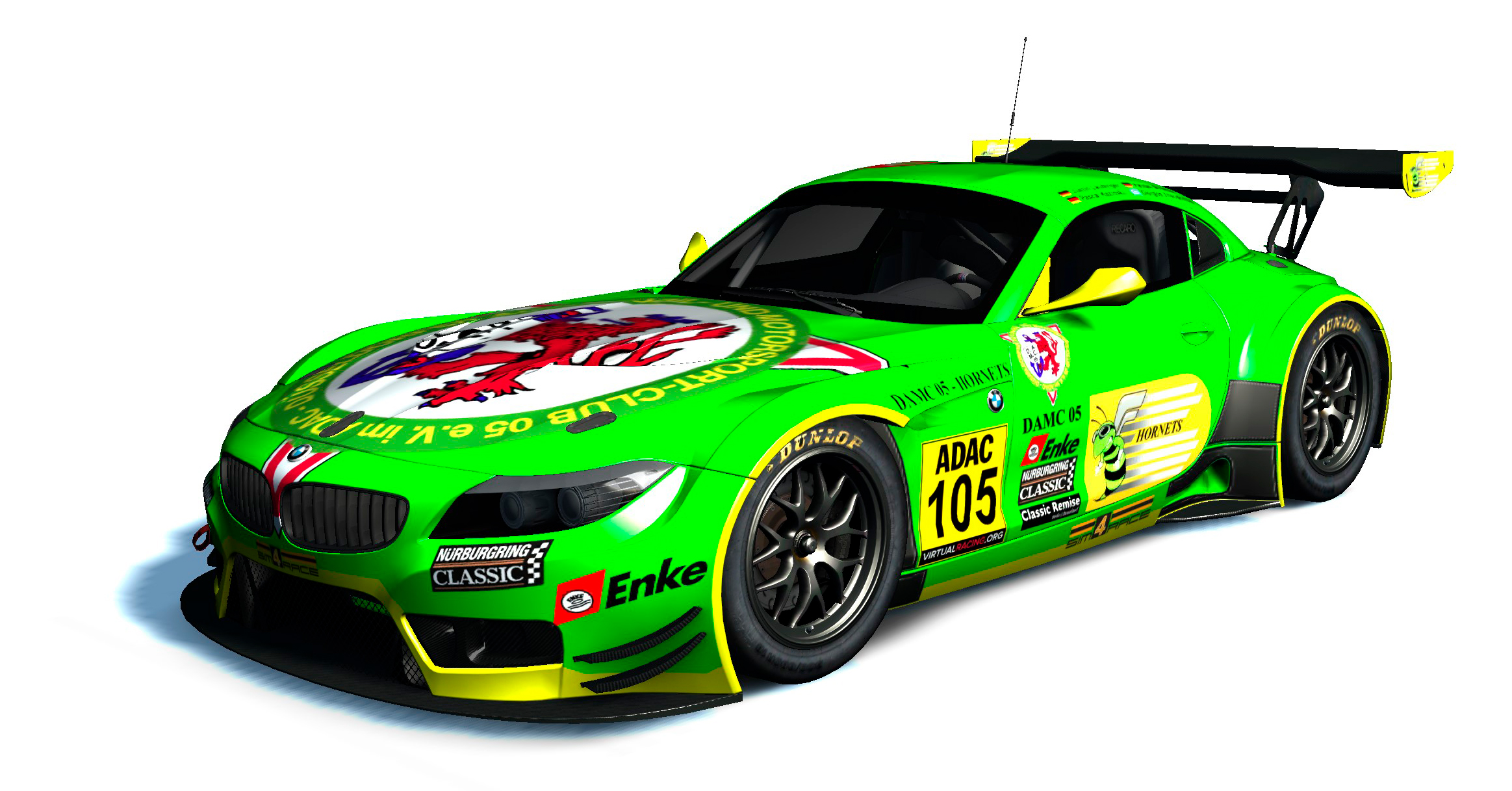
Many cars are digitally recreated for sim racing, such as this BMW Z4 GT3 from Assetto Corsa.

Pole Position II was released in 1983 and featured several improvements like giving the player the choice of different race courses. TX-1, developed by Tatsumi in 1983, was licensed to Namco, who in turn licensed it to Atari in America, thus the game is considered a successor to Pole Position II. TX-1, however, placed a greater emphasis on realism, with details such as forcing players to brake or downshift the gear during corners to avoid the risk of losing control, and let go of the accelerator when going into a skid in order to regain control of the steering. It also used force feedback technology, which caused the steering wheel to vibrate, and the game also featured a unique three-screen arcade display for a more three-dimensional perspective of the track. It also introduced nonlinear gameplay by allowing players to choose which path to drive through after each checkpoint, eventually leading to one of eight possible final destinations.

Since the mid-1980s, it became a trend for arcade racing games to use hydraulic motion simulator arcade cabinets. The trend was sparked by Sega's "taikan" games, with "taikan" meaning "body sensation" in Japanese. The "taikan" trend began when Yu Suzuki's team at Sega (later known as Sega AM2) developed Hang-On (1985), a racing video game where the player sits on and moves a motorbike replica to control the in-game actions. Hang-On was a popular Grand Prix style rear-view motorbike racer, was considered the first full-body-experience video game, and was regarded as the first motorbike simulator for its realism at the time, in both the handling of the player's motorbike and the AI of the computer-controlled motorcyclists. It used force feedback technology and was also one of the first arcade games to use 16-bit graphics and Sega's "Super Scaler" technology that allowed pseudo-3D sprite-scaling at high frame rates. Suzuki's team at Sega followed it with hydraulic motion simulator cabinets for later racing games, such as Out Run in 1986.

In 1986, Konami released WEC Le Mans, an early car driving simulator based on the 24 Hours of Le Mans. It attempted to realistically simulate car driving, with the car jumping up and down, turning back and forth, and spinning up to 180 degrees, with an emphasis on acceleration, braking, and gear shifting, along with the need for counter-steering to avoid spin-outs. It also featured a day-night cycle, accurately simulated courses approved by the Automobile Club de l'Ouest, and force feedback to simulate road vibration in the form of a vibrating steering wheel that reacts to the driver's acceleration and off-road bumps. The first racing game with simulation pretensions on a home system is believed to have been Chequered Flag, released by Psion on the 8-bit ZX Spectrum in 1983. REVS, followed in 1986. REVS was a Formula 3 sim that delivered a semi-realistic driving experience by Geoff Crammond that ran on the Commodore 64 and BBC. REVS had a big fan base in England, but not so much in the United States.

3D polygon graphics appeared in arcade racing simulators with Namco's Winning Run (1988) and Atari's Hard Drivin' (1989), the latter also becoming a staple on home computers, where it was one of the most widely played simulators up to that point. During the late 1980s to early 1990s, arcade racing games such as Out Run and Virtua Racing (1992) had increasingly elaborate, hydraulic motion simulator arcade cabinets, with arcade racers such as Virtua Racing and Daytona USA (1993) increasingly focused on simulating the speed and thrills of racing. At the same time, arcade racing games gradually moved away from the more difficult simulation style of Pole Position. By the early 1990s, arcade racing games had less emphasis on realistic handling or physics, and more emphasis on fast-paced action, speed and thrills.

=== Emergence of sim racing genre (1989–1997) ===
Sim racing is generally acknowledged to have really taken off in 1989 with the introduction of Papyrus Design Group's Indianapolis 500: The Simulation, designed by David Kaemmer and Omar Khudari on 16-bit computer hardware. The game is often generally regarded as the personal computer's first true auto racing simulation. Unlike most other racing games at the time, Indianapolis 500 attempted to simulate realistic physics and telemetry, such as its portrayal of the relationship between the four contact patches and the pavement, as well as the loss of grip when making a high-speed turn, forcing the player to adopt a proper racing line and believable throttle-to-brake interaction. It also featured a garage facility to allow players to enact modifications to their vehicle, including adjustments to the tires, shocks and wings. With Indy 500, players could race the full 500 miles (800 km), where even a blowout after 450 miles (720 km) would take the player out of the competition. The simulation sold over 200,000 copies. It was around this time that sim racing began distinguishing itself from arcade-style racing. Consoles saw the release of Human Entertainment's Fastest 1 for the Sega Mega Drive/Genesis in 1991. It was considered the most realistic Formula 1 racing simulation up until that time.

In 1991, Namco released the arcade game Mitsubishi Driving Simulator, co-developed with Mitsubishi. It was a serious educational street driving simulator that used 3D polygon technology and a sit-down arcade cabinet to simulate realistic driving, including basics such as ensuring the car is in neutral or parking position, starting the engine, placing the car into gear, releasing the hand-brake, and then driving. The player can choose from three routes while following instructions, avoiding collisions with other vehicles or pedestrians, and waiting at traffic lights; the brakes are accurately simulated, with the car creeping forward after taking the foot off the brake until the hand-brake is applied. Leisure Line magazine considered it the "hit of the show" upon its debut at the 1991 JAMMA show. It was designed for use by Japanese driving schools, with a very expensive cost of AU$150,000 or US$117,000 (equivalent to $288,000 in 2025) per unit.

The next major milestone was the 1992 release of Formula One Grand Prix by MicroProse, also developed by Geoff Crammond. This moved the genre along significantly. Multiplayer was made possible by allowing different drivers to take turns, and racers could also hook up their machines for racing via a null modem cable. This only allowed two drivers to race. Leagues emerged where drivers would submit records of their single player races to compare with other drivers. LFRS (Little Formula Racing Series) included 22 two teams consisting of drivers from around the world racing various classes of sim racing in open and restricted setups. Drivers were required to download event specific setup files for each class, to monitor frame rates and apply a checksum to prevent tampering. Drivers saved their race and uploaded to the LFRS server where race results determined overall positions. This is the first sim in which drafting was possible.

Papyrus followed up Indy 500 with IndyCar Racing in 1993 and F1GP was surpassed in all areas. Papyrus later released more tracks and a final expansion included the Indianapolis track plus a paintkit. Now drivers could easily customize their cars. IndyCar Racing sold around 300,000 copies. The first variant of Papyrus' NASCAR Racing series was launched in 1994. In SVGA (640×480) it pushed the PCs of the time to the limit. Suddenly a resolution of 320×200 seemed a poor option and NASCAR Racing was the race sim of choice for anyone with a capable PC, particularly in North America. It was the first sim where cars no longer looked like boxes. It keyed in on sophisticated physics modeling. NASCAR Racing sold over one million units. Moreover, the first real online racing started with NASCAR Racing using the "Hawaii" dial-in servers and it was not uncommon for these early sim racers to have $300 to $1500 phone bills. Online racing had seen its first true realization, and to many, this was the dawn of "real" sim racing.

In 1993, Network Q RAC Rally was released as an authentic sim racer based specifically on rallying, albeit it was preceded by Lombard RAC Rally in 1988. Soon in 1995 Sega also released a rally game, Sega Rally Championship, but this was originally an arcade game incorporating certain realistic elements of sim racers. Rally sim racers became highly popular after the 1998 release of Colin McRae Rally.

1995 saw the release of IndyCar Racing II, updating the first version with the new NASCAR graphics engine. A year later, MicroProse released the successor to F1GP, Grand Prix 2, to much anticipation. GP2 became successful not just because of its detailed and thorough simulation of the 1994 Formula 1 season, but also because it was customizable; this was achievable by way of the online community. Players could change everything about the game: drivers, teams, graphics, physics, car shapes, and eventually even the racetracks. Offline leagues reached their peak with GP2 in 1998.

In 1996, NASCAR Racing 2 was released, further improving the original, and the number of sim racers exploded. The TEN multiplayer hosting service was introduced and went live in November 1997 with the backing of NASCAR and the online sim racing community grew. In 1997, Gran Turismo was released for the PlayStation. It was considered the most realistic racing simulation for consoles at the time, featuring a wealth of meticulous tuning options and an open-ended career mode where players had to undertake driving tests to acquire driving licenses, earn their way into races and choose their own career path. It introduced the racing simulation genre to home consoles, becoming the basis for all modern racing simulations on video game consoles.

Gameplay from the first Gran Turismo featuring a Mitsubishi FTO GPX

=== Graphics accelerator era (1997–2002) ===
Graphics accelerator cards brought a new level of realism to the graphics and physics of sim racing games. These new graphics processing units provided texture mapping, anti-aliasing, particle effects (such as fog, rain, and snow), HDR and the capability to perform polygonal calculations faster, while taking the load off of the main processor. F1 Racing Simulation by Ubisoft, was among the first to utilize the new technology in 1997.

After years of development, MicroProse released Grand Prix 3, which used a more modern graphics engine and featured the same customizable structure of Grand Prix 2. It was not as well received as its predecessor due to a lack of full online multiplayer and the fact it was based on the same, outdated graphics engine. However, because of the two games' graphical and physical similarities, the game was popular with modders who were able to port tracks and cars directly into Grand Prix 3.

Another milestone in sim racing came in 1998 with the release of Papyrus’ Grand Prix Legends, which was based on the 1967 Formula One season. Despite the game's steep learning curve, which made gameplay difficult for casual players, it was hailed as outstanding in all areas, especially in its physics and sound design. It was, however, a commercial failure, sometimes selling only as much as a thousand copies in select markets. For many players, their first real experience of sim racing was through Grand Prix Legends or one of its many derivatives, such as NASCAR Racing 2003. To this day, modding teams have continued to work on the game, further improving on the game's physics and create third-party expansions for the following seasons, such as the 1969 Formula One season.

Wired magazine wrote an in-depth article about racing sims called 'Hard Drive' in their February 1997 issue. In 1997, TORCS was released. Uniquely for racing sims, it was open source, making it even easier for modding teams to add new features and even create whole new games, such as the TORCS-based Speed Dreams. Sega AM2's 1999 arcade game F355 Challenge, later ported to the Dreamcast in 2000, was considered the most accurate simulation of the Ferrari F355 possible up until that time; its focus on realism was considered unusual for an arcade game at the time.

American independent developer Image Space Incorporated produced their own sim Sports Car GT in 1999, and later the officially-licensed F1 series starting in 2000, all published by Electronic Arts. Compared to the Papyrus sims at the time, the physics were easily modifiable, and many communities were been founded with the sole purpose of improving and updating MotorEngine-based games. One such community, SimBin, later created their own company and have since released several games themselves, including some that were officially licensed by the FIA GT Championship and World Touring Car Championship, as well as the freemium racing simulator RaceRoom many years later in 2013.

=== Further developments (2003–present) ===
Sim racing games since the 2000s began exploring more complex vehicle physics implementations. The earliest explorations focused on developing the tire model, later including other areas of the car, including suspension, aerodynamics, and internal components.

One of the earliest examples was Live for Speed, created by ex-Lionhead Studios developers Eric Bailey, Scawen Roberts, and Victor van Vlaardingen in 2003, which implemented a complex tire model by creating a brush deflection model. It was also one of the first games in the genre to feature online multiplayer. Its combination of online features, tire model, and user experience accessibility made Live for Speed a popular game at release. Over the course of over 20 years of development, numerous updates to the game's physics engine have since been introduced, including a deeper simulation of tire wear, dynamic dirt, flat spots, hot spots and tire wall deformation, suspension, aerodynamics, drivetrain, several gearbox types, clutch overheating, car body damage, and engine damage.

Credited as the first true rallying simulation, Richard Burns Rally by Warthog Games was released in 2004. 2001 World Rally Champion and namesake Richard Burns was involved in the development, giving feedback on handling dynamics in particular. It initially received mixed reviews upon release, but the game gradually gained recognition for its multi-body physics engine, driving dynamics, and realistic portrayals of real-life courses, and is now generally considered the most realistic rally simulation in the genre despite its age. Decades later, the game has remained active through sustained continuation efforts by modders, adding new cars, rally stages, features, and physics updates. Eero Piitulainen, the former physics lead of the now-defunct studio, has applauded these third-party efforts.

rFactor was notable for its initial download-only distribution model, and was originally released in 2005 by Image Space Incorporated with fictional cars and tracks. rFactor's tire model was praised by critics upon release, crediting its slip angle, self aligning torque, and cornering force behaviors, however, it was also criticized for its difficult user interface. Its isiMotor 2 engine was later used to create rFpro, an industry-grade standalone version licensed exclusively to racing teams and car manufacturers for advanced driver-assistance systems, self-driving cars and vehicle dynamics. The engine was later used by Brazilian developer Reiza Studios, who had acquired a license from Image Space Incorporated, performing their own refinements to the engine and creating their own games on it, including Automobilista. rFactor's 2012 sequel, rFactor 2, featured significant updates to the engine, including overhauled tire physics, a graphics upgrade, and dynamic track conditions. It became the official simulator of the Formula E series in 2022.

David Kaemmer, co-founder of the now-defunct Papyrus Design Group, released iRacing in 2008, a multiplayer-oriented simulator run on a subscription model. iRacing was a project four years in the making; Kaemmer had worked on the game's NR2003-based source code since 2004. The game retained the multi-body physics system of NR2003, as well as some of the track presentation and multi-user packet code, but everything else was changed, or was made completely new. iRacing is one of the longest supported racing games in the genre, and the game continually receives regular updates between 12-week competition seasons. Continuous improvements to the game's driving model have earned it recognition as the most realistic racing simulation on the market from both critics and players. In 2021, iRacing introduced a revamped damage model, implementing soft body physics and affecting vehicle behavior when players crash on track. In 2024, iRacing introduced the "Tempest" dynamic weather system.

Kunos Simulazioni began development on Assetto Corsa in 2010, a sim built on experience gained from their previous games netKar Pro and Ferrari Virtual Academy but with an entirely new engine. The game was officially released in December 2014. The new engine was designed to provide extensive and detailed tools for modding, allowing players to create highly detailed content with minimal effort. The engine's flexibility has allowed Assetto Corsa to be widely played for years beyond its lifespan and succeed as a hub for third-party mod creation, which in turn has inspired developers to consider a proprietary marketplace for mods as a feature. This was the case with Rennsport, Project Motor Racing, and sequel Assetto Corsa EVO, which all featured the concept in their respective road maps.

Slightly Mad Studios, developers of the Shift and Shift 2 installments of Need for Speed games, launched Project CARS in 2015. It was unique in that it was a crowdfunded effort, with CARS standing for "Community Assisted Racing Simulator". The game used an improved version of the Madness engine from the Need for Speed: Shift titles. By taking advantage of newer hardware, Project CARS introduced a dynamic tire model that simulated the tire's carcass, tire tread, contact patch, and heat transfer. This model, called "Seta", replaced the steady-state version based on lookup tables seen in previous generation simulations. Slightly Mad Studios' Project CARS 2 sequel in 2017 saw improvements based on community feedback.

Sim racing experienced an exponential rise in exposure in 2020, following the suspension of global racing series due to the COVID-19 pandemic. With no live races available, racing organizations, teams, and broadcasters turned to virtual competitions to maintain fan engagement. Live streams of sim racing games from official racing series drew as many as 400,000 viewers. iRacing saw a 50% increase in its subscription base in the first few months of 2020, reaching 160,000 subscribers in April of that year.

Initially releasing in early access, Studio 397 and Motorsport Games released Le Mans Ultimate on 22 July 2025, an officially licensed simulation of the FIA World Endurance Championship and European Le Mans Series. Built on an improved version of the isiMotor 2 physics engine from the studio's previous game rFactor 2, it was praised for its detailed force feedback, in-depth Le Mans Hypercar and LMDh hybrid system simulation, and high-fidelity tire model behavior.

=== Online communities ===
Online sim racing communities are used to coordinate racing schedules, share modified cars and tracks, discuss hardware configurations, and communicate with other participants. Competitive sim racing is also associated with esports, with organised competitions ranging from community-run events to professional championships.

== Presence in motorsport ==
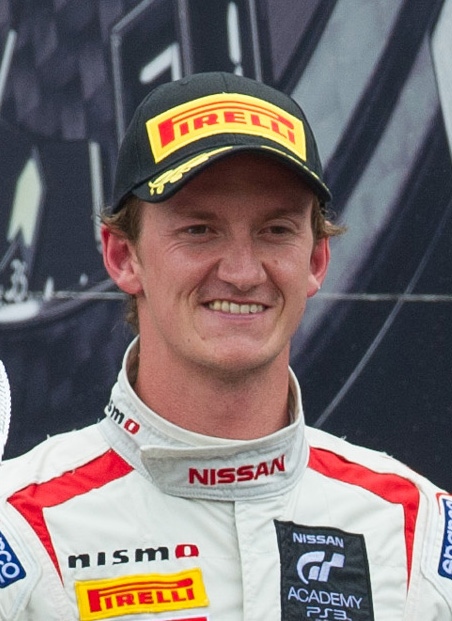
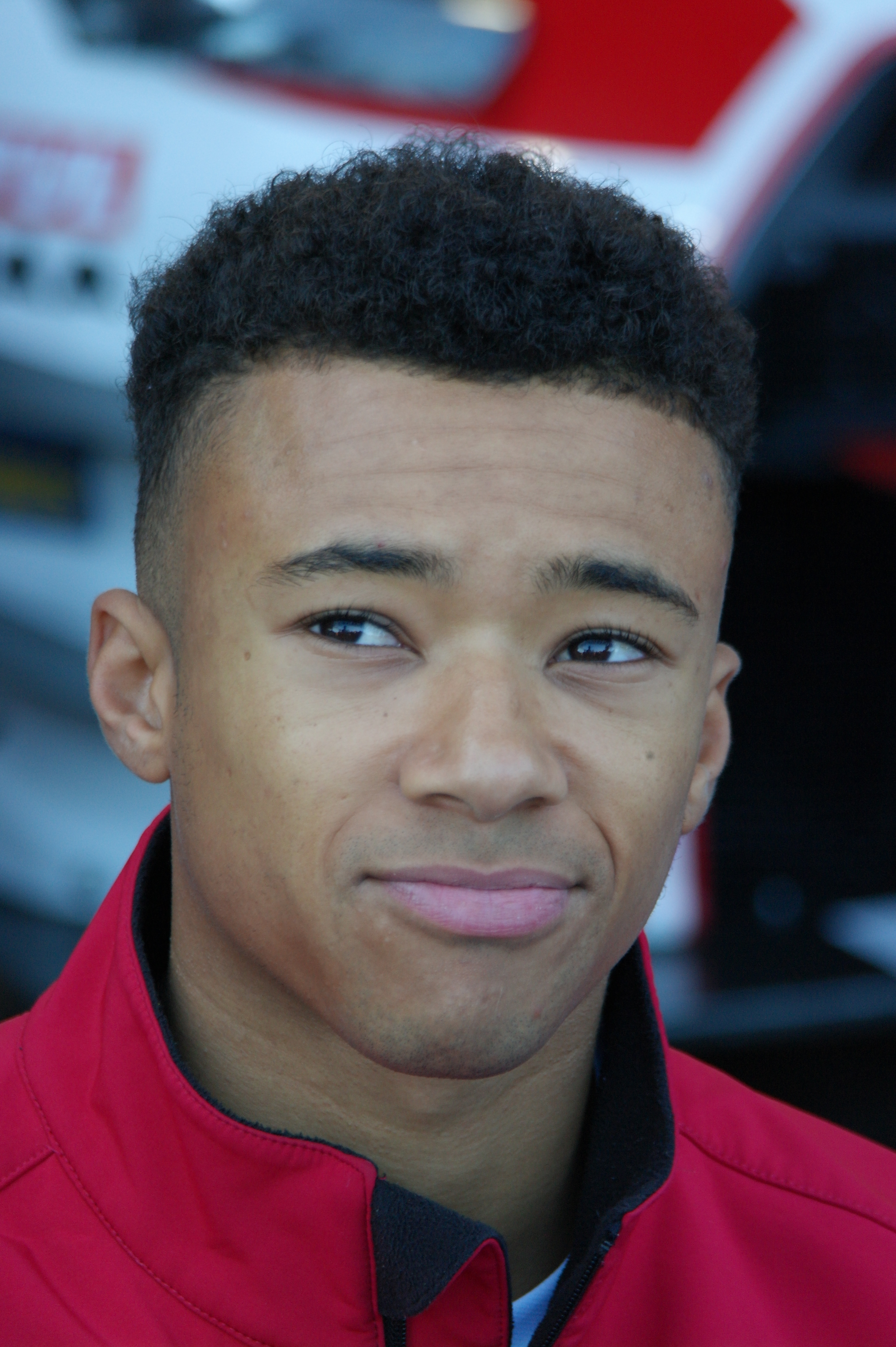
Lucas Ordóñez and Jann Mardenborough are among the earliest examples of sim racers with no previous real-world experience to establish professional racing careers.

The growing fidelity of sim racing has led to its adoption in professional motorsport as talent pipeline for drivers. Some players have established careers using sim racing as a basis, including William Byron, Rajah Caruth, Tim Heinemann, Jann Mardenborough, and Lucas Ordóñez. Others, who had previous real-world experience from pursuing motorsport from a young age, were able to either relaunch their careers through sim racing, such as with James Baldwin, Cem Bölükbaşı, Igor Fraga, and Chris Lulham, or accelerate their progression in real-world motorsport, as with Kaden Honeycutt. It has also grown to become a suitable training tool; drivers including Gabriel Bortoleto, Laurin Heinrich, Parker Kligerman, and Rikuto Kobayashi have considered sim racing as a key part of their development.

Between 2008 and 2016, Nissan and Sony Interactive Entertainment funded GT Academy, a television programme produced by Grand Central Entertainment that gave skilled Gran Turismo players an opportunity to earn a professional racing career with Nissan. The format of the programme was split in four phases, assessing potential candidates for a real-world racing seat. In eight seasons, GT Academy saw 24 graduates, including Mardenborough and Ordóñez. Two graduates, Wolfgang Reip and Florian Strauss, notably won the 2015 Bathurst 12 Hour overall with Nissan, joined by professional teammate Katsumasa Chiyo.

During the COVID-19 pandemic, several racing series used sim racing as a platform to host sanctioned events in response to the global disruption of motorsport, including the eNASCAR iRacing Pro Invitational Series, IndyCar iRacing Challenge, W Series Esports League, Formula E Race at Home Challenge, and 24 Hours of Le Mans Virtual. Formula One hosted Virtual Grands Prix on the official F1 2020 video game following the cancellation of part of the 2020 Formula One World Championship due to the pandemic, which featured many Formula One drivers, including Alex Albon, Lando Norris, and George Russell.

The Nordschleife license system was changed in 2025 to acknowledge sim racing, following four-time Formula One World Drivers' Champion Max Verstappen's debut in the Nürburgring Langstrecken-Serie in 2025; the German Motor Sport Federation officially recognized participating in the NLS's official sim racing series, Digital NLS, as counting toward a Permit B license. Verstappen is himself an avid sim racer.

== Ranked multiplayer ==
Some racing games have introduced a multiplayer driver ranking system for organizing online racing. There are usually two orthogonal types of driver rankings, one which ranks drivers according to how safe they are on track and with respect to other drivers in avoiding incidents, and one according to how fast they are. For the driver speed rating, an Elo rating system is typically used, as a form of matchmaking to group together drivers of similar skills. The safety rating instead is typically used as a form of licence which is required to access some classes of races.

Sim racing games that include some form of ranked online racing are iRacing (with iRating and safety rating), Gran Turismo Sport (with Driver Class and Sportsmanship Points), Project CARS 2 (Racecraft Ranking and Skill Rating), RaceRoom (with Reputation Rating and Rating), and Assetto Corsa Competizione. Other games have similar systems under development, like Automobilista 2 and rFactor 2.

=== Esports ===
The FIA, the highest governing body for auto racing, use various platforms such as Gran Turismo, Assetto Corsa Competizione and iRacing to host sanctioned events.

Some games also feature esports, including events hosted either directly by the developer or by other organizers, with premier series receiving official developer support. Some of these series can include large prize pools and may see participation from a number of high-profile esports organizations across the globe, which have included FaZe Clan, G2 Esports, Mouz, Team Falcons, Team Redline, Virtus.pro, and XSET. In some cases, these players are rewarded with test drives; Alpine and Mercedes-Benz grant winners of their respective events with an exclusive test of a race car from their brand's car lineup.

The Fédération Internationale de l'Automobile, the highest governing body in auto racing, formally incorporated an esports appendix into its International Sporting Code in 2024. The new regulatory section was introduced as Appendix E, providing a formal structure for both international and national esports events, and establishing the organizational requirements and conduct standards for competitions sanctioned by the FIA. The FIA MENA Esports Championship, held on Gran Turismo 7, was the first esports competition to utilize the new appendix in November 2025. Prior to the introduction of the new esports appendix, FIA-sanctioned series and events were already in place; the Gran Turismo World Series was sanctioned by the FIA between 2018 and 2021, and Assetto Corsa Competizione hosted the 2022 FIA Motorsport Games Esports Cup.

==== Console-based tournaments ====
Some console racing games have featured major esports events, though they are less common than their computer-based counterparts. Two such notable franchises, Gran Turismo and Forza, each have had organized events on their respective platforms. Since 2018, Polyphony Digital, developers of the Gran Turismo series, have hosted the Gran Turismo World Series, which was previously sanctioned by the Fédération Internationale de l'Automobile (FIA) from 2018 to 2021. Additionally, Gran Turismo also hosted the 'Motorsport' event in both editions of the Olympic Esports Series. Turn 10 Studios, the creators of the Forza Motorsport series, organized the Forza Racing Championship between 2016 and 2018 in partnership with ESL. Unlike traditional events, however, which typically use a wheel and pedals, Turn 10 Studios had their players use game controllers.

==== Officially sanctioned series ====
A number of real-world racing series and governing bodies have established officially sanctioned sim racing series across multiple platforms. Car manufacturers have also hosted tournaments of their own.

Assetto Corsa Competizione previously featured official tournaments hosted by governing body SRO Motorsports Group, utilizing the game's library of officially licensed Group GT3, SRO GT4, SRO GT2, and single-make sports car content. These competitions for the game were hosted under SRO Esports, which included esports tournaments for SRO-sanctioned series such as the Intercontinental GT Challenge, GT World Challenge America, GT World Challenge Europe, and GT World Challenge Asia, all sponsored by Mobileye.

Formula One has annually hosted F1 Sim Racing since 2017, and is played on Formula One's official games during several shows in the late year. They have a current prize fund of $750,000 and all participating teams from the real-life Formula One championship select three drivers to represent them, with two of those drivers participating in select races. Jarno Opmeer holds the most titles with three, and Frederik Rasmussen holds the record for the most wins and pole positions.

iRacing currently hosts numerous esports championships on its platform, including official series presented by major car manufacturers and governing bodies such as the Porsche TAG Heuer Esports Supercup, World of Outlaws Pro Series, IMSA Esports Global Championship, and the FIA F4 Global Esports Championship. eNASCAR is also hosted on iRacing, including its premier championship, the eNASCAR Coca-Cola iRacing Series, which comes with a purse of $500,000, with $100,000 awarded to the champion.

== See also ==
- Direct-drive sim racing wheel
- Simulator pedal
- Full motion racing simulator
- List of racing video games
- Racing game
- Vehicle simulation game
- Virtual reality simulator
