= Supercars Championship in video games =

There have been numerous video games which have included the drivers, teams, cars and circuits from the Supercars Championship, the leading touring car category in Australia. Several of these games were officially licensed by Supercars. From 2011 to 2014, an online championship sanctioned by Supercars was contested on iRacing. In 2017, Supercars launched an esports competition, now known as the Supercars Eseries, using Forza Motorsport 6 and Forza Motorsport 7 until 2018 and iRacing from 2019.

== History ==
=== Early computer games ===
Touring Car Champions, released by Torus Games and Virtual Sports Interactive for Windows in June 1997, was the first game to be based on Australian touring car racing. It featured real-life video from the Mount Panorama Circuit with the virtual cars superimposed over the top. The game was endorsed by the Holden Racing Team, and its drivers from the 1995 Bathurst 1000—Peter Brock, Tomas Mezera, Craig Lowndes and Greg Murphy—were featured in the game, along with cut scenes from the race. The game included a Holden Commodore-based and a Ford Falcon-based car, with the Holden Racing Team's 1996 livery being used on one of the Commodore-based cars. Players took part in a series of races around the Mount Panorama Circuit, with prize money being used to upgrade the car or change the team manager and pit crew.

This was followed by Dick Johnson V8 Challenge, released for Windows in December 1999. It featured 25 drivers of what was then known as V8 Supercars as well as four tracks: Oran Park Raceway, Sandown Raceway, Queensland Raceway and Mount Panorama. The physics model of the game was created with input from Dick and Steven Johnson. The game featured multiple camera angles with which to race and supported the use of a force-feedback racing wheel.

=== Codemasters ===
The third instalment of Codemasters' TOCA Touring Car series, TOCA World Touring Cars, released in 2000, was available for the PlayStation and Game Boy Advance. It featured cars loosely based on the Ford AU Falcon and Holden VT Commodore that were used in V8 Supercars at the time.

In 2002, V8 Supercars: Race Driver, the fourth game in Codemasters' series, was released for the PlayStation 2, Xbox and Windows. It was the first game to feature the name V8 Supercars in its title and was the first in a series of three games that would be released with such branding. The game featured 21 cars and seven tracks from the 2001 Shell Championship Series.

This was followed by V8 Supercars 2 in 2004, which featured content from the 2003 season and was also released for PlayStation 2, PSP, Xbox and Windows. The final game in the series was V8 Supercars 3, which was released in 2006 for PlayStation 2, PSP, Nintendo DS, Xbox, Windows and Mac OS X and featured all cars and tracks from the 2005 season. It included the greatest depth of V8 Supercars content of all of the games released.

This was the last full appearance of Supercars in the series, however selected cars have continued to appear in the series, most recently in 2019's Grid.

=== Gran Turismo ===
In 2001, a Ford AU Falcon campaigned by Ford Tickford Racing in the 2000 Shell Championship Series appeared in Gran Turismo 3: A-Spec, the first time an Australian car had been included in the series. The car since appeared in each game of the Gran Turismo series up to and including Gran Turismo 6.

=== Forza Motorsport ===
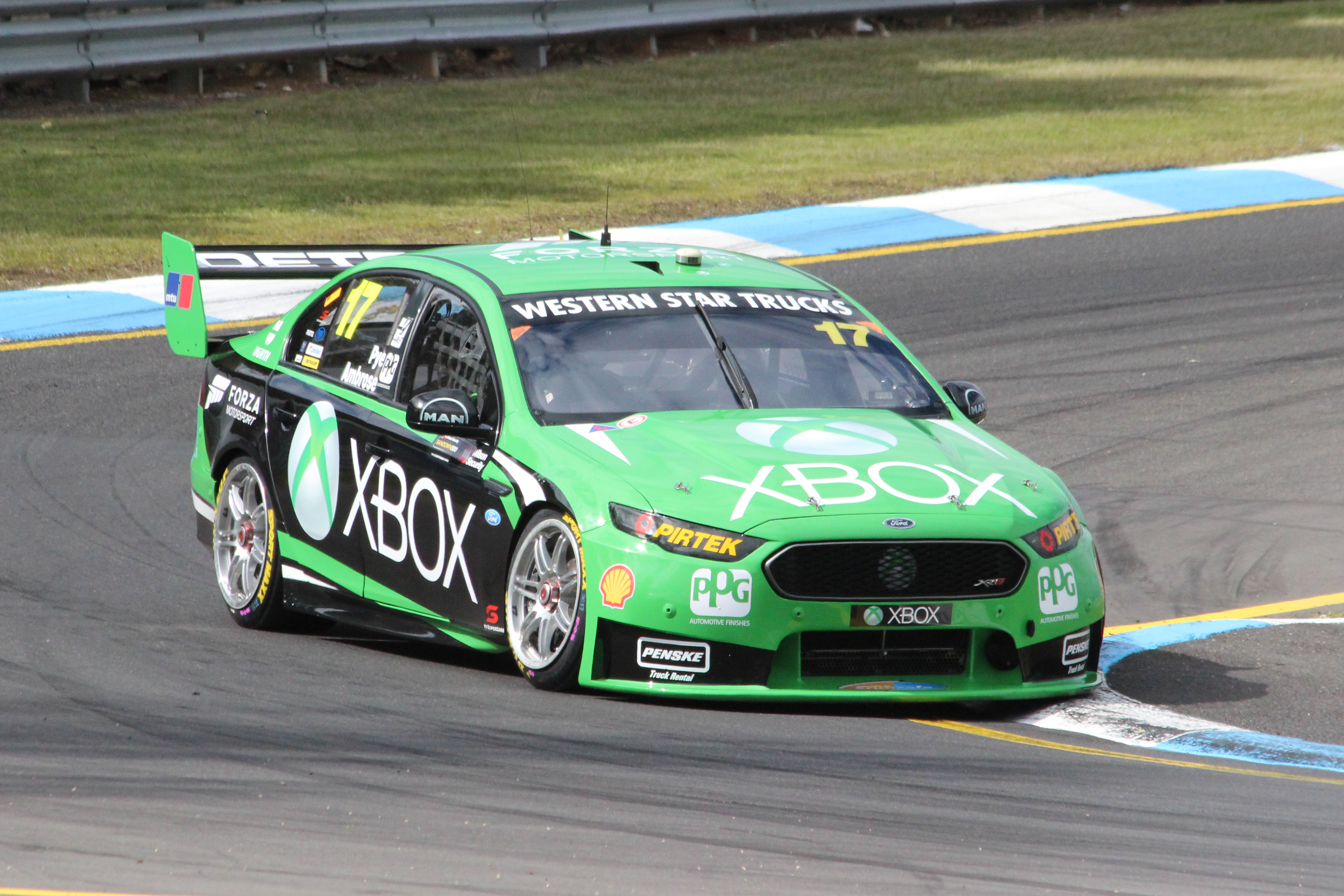
DJR Team Penske carried Xbox and Forza Motorsport signage at selected events in 2014 and 2015.

The V8 Supercars licence has featured in the Forza Motorsport series. The 2015 edition, Forza Motorsport 6, featured ten V8 Supercars including all five marques that competed in the 2015 season. The series, a flagship series of Microsoft's Xbox series of consoles, has also featured as a sponsor on multiple real life V8 Supercars, including a wildcard entry from Triple Eight Race Engineering at the 2013 Supercheap Auto Bathurst 1000 and on DJR Team Penske cars in 2014 and 2015.

In 2016, two cars from the newly renamed Supercars Championship and one car from the 2015 V8 Supercars Championship appeared in Forza Horizon 3, their first appearance in the spin-off series to Forza Motorsport, as part of a wider focus on Australian content. The two 2016 season cars came in the Forza Horizon 3 Motorsport All-Stars DLC. The other 2015 season car was attainable in game via a Forzathon Event. Forza Motorsport 7 featured a range of Supercars dating from 2015 to 2017.

=== Electronic Arts ===
The 2002 game V8 Challenge was released by EA Sports. EA Sports also sponsored the Holden Young Lions entry through the 2001 and 2002 seasons and EA Sports also sponsored the Team Brock entry through the 2003 season.

EA made a return to Supercars with Real Racing 3 with annual Supercars updates from 2016 to 2018 featuring a select number of cars entered in their respective seasons. Since 1 January 2019, all existing Supercars models have been discontinued and are no longer available to be purchased in-game.

== Esports ==
=== Forza Motorsport ===
In 2017, Supercars Australia launched an esports competition using Forza Motorsport 6. The inaugural event featured online competition with the winning entrants competing in a joint race against Supercars Championship drivers at the 2017 Supercheap Auto Bathurst 1000, in a similar concept seen to Formula E, and then a series of races to determine the outright winner. In 2018, the series, which became known as the Supercars Eseries, expanded to six events using Forza Motorsport 7 and received title sponsorship from Boost Mobile as part of a campaign to attract a younger demographic of fans to Supercars.

=== iRacing ===
From 2011 to 2014, an online esports championship sanctioned by Supercars was contested on iRacing.

In 2019, the Eseries, with backing from Gfinity Australia, moved to iRacing with a combination of dedicated esports teams and entries from Supercars teams including Triple Eight Race Engineering Andretti United]], the latter finishing first and second in the championship. The six round championship was also broadcast live on Fox Sports and streamed on Kayo Sports. With iRacing in 2019 only featuring the older Ford FG Falcon and Holden VF Commodore models, superseded in the Supercars Championship in 2015 and 2019 respectively, plans were also launched to develop the contemporary Ford Mustang GT and Holden ZB Commodore into the game for 2020.

With the 2020 Supercars Championship calendar disrupted due to the COVID-19 pandemic, the BP Supercars All Stars Eseries was announced to commence in April 2020, with all championship drivers competing using the new Mustang and Commodore models. Various wildcards, including international drivers, former Supercars Championship drivers and Super2 Series drivers later made appearances in the series. A regular Eseries then followed in 2020, once again focused on dedicated esports drivers. Separate series were again held in 2021, however with each series now racing on the same night.

=== Eseries winners ===
| Year | Series Name | Driver | Team | Game | Report |
|---|---|---|---|---|---|
| 2018 | Boost Mobile Supercars E-Series | (Australia) Matthew Bink | | Forza Motorsport 7 | Report |
| 2019 | Gfinity Supercars Eseries | (Australia) Josh Rogers | Walkinshaw Andretti United | iRacing | Report |
| 2020 | BP Supercars All Stars Eseries | (New Zealand) Shane van Gisbergen | Triple Eight Race Engineering | iRacing | Report |
| 2020 | Repco Supercars Pro Eseries | (Australia) Dayne Warren | Walkinshaw Andretti United | iRacing | Report |
| 2021 | Cash Converters Supercars Eseries - All Stars | (Australia) Brodie Kostecki | Erebus Motorsport | iRacing | Report |
| 2021 | Cash Converters Supercars Eseries - Pro | (Australia) Dayne Warren | Walkinshaw Andretti United | iRacing | Report |
| 2022 | Cash Converters Supercars Eseries - All Stars | (Australia) Brodie Kostecki | Erebus Motorsport | iRacing | Report |
| 2022 | Cash Converters Supercars Eseries - Pro | (Australia) Madison Down | Brad Jones Racing | iRacing | Report |

== List of licensed games ==
Fully licensed games have accurate cars (including liveries), drivers and or tracks from the Supercars Championship series. Several of these games only feature a limited selection of V8 Supercars rather than the entire field of cars and tracks.

| Title | Release date | Platform(s) | Developer | Publisher | Notes |
|---|---|---|---|---|---|
| Dick Johnson V8 Challenge | 1999 | Windows | Torus Games | Tru Blu Entertainment | |
| V8 Supercars: Race Driver | 2002 | PlayStation 2, Xbox, Windows | Codemasters | Codemasters | Also known as: TOCA Race Driver; DTM Race Driver (Germany); Pro Race Driver (United States) |
| V8 Challenge | 2002 | Windows | Digital Illusions CE | EA Sports | |
| V8 Supercars 2 | 2004 | PlayStation 2, Xbox, Windows, PSP | Codemasters | Codemasters | Also known as: TOCA Race Driver 2 DTM Race Driver 2 (Germany) |
| V8 Supercars 3 | 2006 | PlayStation 2, Xbox, Windows, PSP, OS X, Nintendo DS | Codemasters | Codemasters | Also known as: TOCA Race Driver 3 DTM Race Driver 3 (Germany) |
| Forza Motorsport 3 | 2009 | Xbox 360 | Turn 10 Studios | Microsoft Studios | |
| Forza Motorsport 4 | 2011 | Xbox 360 | Turn 10 Studios | Microsoft Studios | |
| Forza Motorsport 5 | 2013 | Xbox One | Turn 10 Studios | Microsoft Studios | |
| Real Racing 3 | 2013 | iOS, Android, Shield Portable, Blackberry 10 | Firemonkeys | EA Games | Added in update, September 2016; Removed since January 2019 |
| Forza Motorsport 6 | 2015 | Xbox One, Windows | Turn 10 Studios | Microsoft Studios | |
| Forza Horizon 3 | 2016 | Xbox One, Windows | Playground Games | Microsoft Studios | |
| Forza Motorsport 7 | 2017 | Xbox One, Windows | Turn 10 Studios | Microsoft Studios | |

=== Other appearances ===
Various games have also included a more limited selection of cars from the Supercars Championship series, without having a full series licence. This does not include several games which have received fan-made modifications to add V8 Supercars content, including rFactor, Assetto Corsa, Automobilista, NASCAR Racing 2003 Season and GTR 2. Other games, such as Project CARS, its sequel Project CARS 2 and Gran Turismo 6, have featured the V8 Supercars' most famous circuit, Mount Panorama, without featuring full series content.

| Title | Release date | Platform(s) | Developer | Publisher | Notes |
|---|---|---|---|---|---|
| Touring Car Champions | 1997 | Windows | Torus Games | Virtual Sports Interactive | Real-life video from the Mount Panorama Circuit with virtual cars superimposed over the top. |
| Need for Speed: High Stakes | 1999 | PlayStation, Windows | EA Canada (PS); EA Seattle (PC) | Electronic Arts | 1999 Holden Racing Team VT Commodore is an unlockable car |
| HSV Adventure Racing | 1999 | Nintendo 64 | Paradigm Entertainment | Electronic Arts | 1999 Holden Racing Team VT Commodore is an unlockable car |
| TOCA World Touring Cars | 2000 | PlayStation, Game Boy Advance | Codemasters | Codemasters | Generic liveries on V8 Supercars-style chassis. Also known as: Jarrett & Labonte Stock Car Racing (United States); WTC: World Touring Car Championship (Japan) |
| Gran Turismo series | 2001–2013 | PlayStation 2, PSP, PlayStation 3 | Polyphony Digital | Sony Computer Entertainment | Includes only the 2000 Ford Tickford Racing Ford AU Falcon, which appeared in all games in the series from Gran Turismo 3: A-Spec (2001) to Gran Turismo 6 (2013). |
| iRacing | 2008 | Windows, OS X, Linux | iRacing.com Motorsport Simulations | iRacing.com Motorsport Simulations | Includes the Chevrolet Camaro ZL1-1LE, Ford FG Falcon (from 2009 and 2013), Mustang S550 and Mustang S650 Gen3, Holden VF and ZB Commodore's with player-generated liveries. |
| Game Stock Car Extreme | 2013 | Windows | Reiza Studios | Reiza Studios | Generic liveries on V8 Supercars-style chassis. |
| Grid 2 | 2013 | Windows, PlayStation 3, Xbox 360, OS X | Codemasters | Codemasters, Feral Interactive | Includes a Ford Falcon ute with a V8 Supercar-style bodykit. |
| Grid Autosport | 2014 | Windows, PlayStation 3, Xbox 360, Linux, OS X, iOS, Nintendo Switch, Android | Codemasters, Feral Interactive | Codemasters, Feral Interactive | Generic liveries on V8 Supercars-style chassis. Also includes Ford Falcon and Holden Commodore SuperUtes. |
| Project CARS | 2015 | Windows, PlayStation 4, Xbox One | Slightly Mad Studios | Bandai Namco Entertainment | Generic liveries on V8 Supercars-style chassis. Includes the Ford FG Falcon as a free DLC. |
| Automobilista | 2016 | Windows | Reiza Studios | Reiza Studios | Generic liveries on V8 Supercars-style chassis. |
| Project CARS 2 | 2017 | Windows, PlayStation 4, Xbox One | Slightly Mad Studios | Bandai Namco Entertainment | Generic liveries on V8 Supercars-style chassis. Includes the Ford FG Falcon. |
| Grid | 2019 | Windows, PlayStation 4, Xbox One, Stadia | Codemasters | Codemasters | Generic and real life liveries on V8 Supercars-style chassis. Includes the Ford FG-X Falcon and Holden ZB Commodore. |
| Automobilista 2 | 2020 | Windows | Reiza Studios | Reiza Studios | Generic liveries on V8 Supercars-style chassis. |
| Project CARS 3 | 2020 | Windows, PlayStation 4, Xbox One | Slightly Mad Studios | Bandai Namco Entertainment | Generic liveries on V8 Supercars-style chassis. Includes the Ford FG Falcon. |
| Grid Legends | 2021 | Windows, MacOS, PlayStation 4, PlayStation 5, Xbox One, Xbox Series X/S | Codemasters | Electronic Arts | Generic liveries on V8 Supercars-style chassis. Includes the Ford FG-X Falcon and Holden ZB Commodore. |

== See also ==
- Racing video game
