= Race Driver: Grid =

2008 racing video game

- PAL cover art featuring a Dodge Viper SRT-10
- Developers: Codemasters; Firebrand Games (DS); Spiced Bits (J2ME)
- Publishers: Codemasters; Glu Mobile (J2ME); Sega (Arcade); Feral Interactive (OS X)
- Composers: Ian Livingstone, Aaron Sapp, Thomas J. Bergersen, Allister Brimble (DS), Anthony N. Putson (DS)
- Series: Grid
- Engine: EGO 1.0; Octane (DS)
- Platforms: Microsoft Windows; PlayStation 3; Xbox 360; Nintendo DS; Arcade; OS X; Java ME
- Release: Java ME: WW: 15 April 2008; Microsoft Windows, PlayStation 3 & Xbox 360: EU: 30 May 2008; NA: 3 June 2008; AU: 12 June 2008; Nintendo DS: NA: 5 August 2008; EU: 8 August 2008; AU: 15 August 2008; Arcade: EU: 10 November 2010; OS X: EU: 14 April 2013
- Genre: Racing
- Modes: Single-player, multiplayer
- Arcade system: Sega Europa-R

Race Driver: Grid, known outside of Europe and Japan as Grid, is a 2008 racing video game developed and published by Codemasters for Microsoft Windows, PlayStation 3, Xbox 360, Nintendo DS, arcade, Java ME and OS X. It is the first game in the Grid series.

== Gameplay ==
Grid features several different types of motorsports spanning three major regions.

Grid was developed and published by Codemasters, the creators of the TOCA series. It is a game in which the player runs their own race team, acting as the primary driver. As players progress they gain sponsors and can hire a teammate to drive alongside them in certain events.

The game begins with the player accepting jobs to drive for other teams to earn money, and once the player gains enough capital they can purchase their own vehicles and drive independently, as well as continuing to drive for other teams should they choose to. Grid features a gameplay mechanic known as Flashback which allows the player to rewind gameplay by up to ten seconds and resume from their chosen point, similar to the "rewind" ability in Prince of Persia: The Sands of Time. This is a limited-use feature, determined by the difficulty setting.

Grid features several modes of competition using various cars. Three main regions are found in the game, United States, Europe, and Japan, each with their own championship. Each of the game's 43 cars are tied to one of these three regions. Grid also features several types of events to compete in, including GT championships, drifting, touge, open wheel racing and demolition derby, as well as variants on several of these motorsports. Players can also participate in the 24 Hours of Le Mans at the end of each racing season.

Courses in the game are a mixture of real world and fictional circuits and point-to-point tracks. Real road courses such as Le Mans and Spa-Francorchamps are included, while some defunct street circuits such as the Detroit street circuit in Michigan and the Washington D.C. street circuit are also included. There are also several fictional tracks inspired by real-world locations and circuits, such as street courses in San Francisco, California and Milan, Italy as well as Mount Haruna.

The Nintendo DS version is a racing simulator consisting of twenty available circuits across Europe, Japan and the US, along with 25 cars to choose from. The game also includes an updated version of the track designer from Race Driver: Create & Race, which allows players to create their own custom circuits and roadside billboards. The game also features vehicle customization and online multiplayer.

== Development and marketing ==
Grid uses Codemasters' own Ego engine, an updated version of the Neon engine already being used in the critically acclaimed Colin McRae: Dirt. The damage code has been completely rewritten to allow for environments with the potential for persistent damage. Ambisonics was used in the audio engine of the PlayStation 3 and Xbox 360 versions. Firebrand Games, developer of Race Driver: Create & Race, made a Nintendo DS version of the game that ran on Create's Octane engine, incorporating its 3D racing graphics, user interface and track editor.

A mobile version published by Glu Mobile was released in April 2008. A demo was released on the PlayStation Store, Xbox Live Marketplace and for Microsoft Windows in May 2008. The demo allowed players to try two game modes: racing and drifting. The demo also featured a competition challenge, with a BMW 3 series, as a prize, for European-based gamers, and a Ford Mustang for U.S.-based players. The American competition ended at midnight on 25 May, whereas the European competition ended on 31 May, also at midnight. The demo also had two competition tracks available online, and allowed up to 12 players to compete online. The demo has been downloaded by over one million people over three platforms.

In 2010, an arcade version of the game was published by Sega. Grid has had its official servers for Microsoft Windows and PlayStation 3 shut down as of 19 June 2011. The servers for the Xbox 360 version are still running as of July 2014.

=== Downloadable content ===
Codemasters released two downloadable content (DLC) packs; the first of the two was released on 4 December 2008, the 8-Ball Pack on the Xbox Live Marketplace and the PlayStation Network. The pack contained eight new cars and these include the McLaren F1 GTR, TVR Cerbera Speed 12, Mitsubishi Lancer Evolution X, Honda S2000, Nissan GT-R (S-G2008), Volkswagen Nardo, Pontiac Firebird and the Volvo C30. The 8-Ball Pack also came complete with two new multiplayer events set on existing circuits from across Grid's three continents. The second DLC pack dubbed the Prestige Pack was released in March 4, 2010 in PAL regions and March 11, 2010 in North America, for the PlayStation 3 only. The pack added Mount Panorama Circuit and ten cars, including the Ferrari F430 GTC, Bugatti Veyron and Ferrari F575 GTC.

== Reception ==
Reception

Aggregate score
Aggregator	Score			
Aggregator	DS	PC	PS3	Xbox 360
Metacritic	79/100	87/100	87/100	87/100

Review scores
Publication	Score			
Publication	DS	PC	PS3	Xbox 360
1Up.com	C−	N/A	N/A	N/A
Edge	N/A	N/A	9/10	N/A
Eurogamer	8/10	N/A	N/A	9/10
Game Informer	N/A	N/A	9/10	9/10
GamePro	N/A	N/A	N/A	4/5
GameRevolution	N/A	N/A	N/A	B
GameSpot	8.5/10	N/A	8/10	8/10
GameSpy	N/A	N/A	4/5	4/5
GameTrailers	N/A	N/A	9/10	9/10
GameZone	7.8/10	N/A	9/10	N/A
IGN	8.3/10	8.7/10	8.7/10	(US) 8.7/10 (AU) 7.9/10
Nintendo Power	8.5/10	N/A	N/A	N/A
Official Nintendo Magazine	89%	N/A	N/A	N/A
Official Xbox Magazine (US)	N/A	N/A	N/A	9/10
PC Gamer (US)	N/A	86%	N/A	N/A
PlayStation: The Official Magazine	N/A	N/A	5/5	N/A
VideoGamer.com	8/10	N/A	N/A	N/A
411Mania	N/A	9.5/10	N/A	N/A
Digital Spy	N/A	N/A	N/A	4/5

Grid received "generally favorable" reviews on all platforms according to video game review aggregator website Metacritic.

Edge ranked the game #41 on its list of "The 100 Best Games To Play Today", stating that: "it blows cobwebs from the genre, with handling a great balance of sim twitchiness and arcade abandon, breathtaking speed, and a sense of being there like no other racer".

North American publication Nintendo Power gave the game a score of 8.5 out of ten. The review heaped praise on the game's robust car and course customization features, superb graphics, and multiplayer modes. N-Europe gave the game an eight out of ten. IGN awarded Grid with its DS: Best Racing Game 2008 award.

=== Awards ===
Grid received a BAFTA award in the Sports category at the British Academy Video Games Awards. During the 12th Annual Interactive Achievement Awards, the Academy of Interactive Arts & Sciences nominated Grid for "Racing Game of the Year".

== Sequels ==
Codemasters released a sequel to Grid, named Grid 2, using the improved EGO engine and was released in May 2013. It is followed by a second sequel Grid Autosport, released in June 2014. A fourth installment, simply known as Grid, was released in September 2019 for Microsoft Windows, Xbox One, PlayStation 4 and Stadia. A fifth and latest installment, Grid Legends, was released in February 2022 with Electronic Arts served as a new publisher.
