= TOCA Race Driver 3 =

2006 video game

- Cover featuring the TVR T400R and Vauxhall VX220
- Developers: Codemasters; Sumo Digital (PSP)
- Publisher: Codemasters
- Series: TOCA
- Platforms: Windows, PlayStation 2, Xbox, PlayStation Portable, OS X
- Release: Windows, PlayStation 2, Xbox: NA: 21 February 2006; AU: 23 February 2006; EU: 24 February 2006; PlayStation Portable: EU: 16 February 2007; AU: 23 February 2007; OS X: NA: 24 October 2008
- Genre: Racing
- Modes: Single-player, Multiplayer

TOCA Race Driver 3, also known as DTM Race Driver 3 in Germany and Benelux and V8 Supercars Australia 3 in Australia and New Zealand, is a racing video game developed and published by Codemasters for Microsoft Windows, PlayStation 2, Xbox, PlayStation Portable and OS X. It is the sixth game in the TOCA series. The game features several fully licensed championships, including the DTM series and V8 Supercar championship. This is the last in the series to have TOCA in its title as following on from this TOCA was dropped in favour of just Race Driver, which later became the Grid series. Despite featuring the name TOCA in its title, the game did not feature the British Touring Car Championship. The game received positive reviews, frequently being compared favourably to Gran Turismo 4 and Forza Motorsport, in the aspects of cars on track, collision and wear damage.

== Gameplay ==
Race Driver 3 features many racing disciplines, such as kart racing, monster trucks, Formula 1 and V8 Supercars.

TOCA Race Driver 3 includes 120 Championships and 35 types of racing through the Championship in World Tour, Pro Career, and Free Race. Also, it has Bonus Championships in different disciplines. They take place largely in the UK and Germany, though many more tracks are unlocked by winning cups in Pro Career, or by setting a lap time record on a course within Pro Career mode. Open-wheel, GT, Oval racing, Rallying and Off-road racing were all featured and can be raced in either a detailed Pro Career mode or an open-ended World Tour. The game features many real-life competitions, including British GT, DTM, IRL and V8 Supercars, as well as a Vintage series, other GT series, and Rally. The Formula Williams FW27 is the featured car of the Formula 1 series in the game. The career mode progresses with various cutscenes featuring the player character's crew chief providing driving tips and general commentary.

Settings for racing are largely customisable. Players can adjust the number of laps and difficulty level. Race rules such as wrong way, corner-cutting, and careless driving penalties, and racing flags can also be turned on or off. Players can choose to qualify for races, which allows them to secure a position on the starting grid rather than being placed at the back.

Online play allows 12 and 8 players on PlayStation 2 and Xbox, respectively. For the PC up to 12 players could race together with the built-in GameSpy Server or by using a LAN. When GameSpy closed in 2014 online multiplayer was subsequently made possible using the Free Tunngle Network but was shut down in April 2018 due to pending requirements of the new European General Data Protection Regulation.

The game supports the use of a racing wheel. For PlayStation 2 consoles and Microsoft Windows players can utilise wheels such as the Logitech Driving Force GT and the Driving Force Pro. Other wheels are also supported, such as the Mad Catz MC2, which supports multiple platforms.

== Development and release ==
TOCA Race Driver 3 was unveiled on 26 May 2005 under the title TOCA Race Driver 2006. The name Race Driver 2006 was later used for a PlayStation Portable Race Driver game. A single player demo was released in December 2005. It was released in February 2006 for Windows, PlayStation 2, and Xbox. A PlayStation Portable version entitled TOCA Race Driver 3 Challenge was released in February 2007. A Mac OS X port was released on 24 October 2008. The game was part of the early GOG.com lineup.

The damage model from TOCA Race Driver 2 is improved. Codemasters added additional damage elements for engine, suspension, axle and steering. Tyre modelling has also been improved. Tyres are affected by being cool or hot and wear over time. The developers wanted to improve the single-player racing experience. Johnathan Davis, designer on Race Driver 3 felt that in too many games "you start on the grid and either get left behind or your overtake the AI and go on to win. We really wanted people to battle all the way through". Codemasters interviewed real racing drivers to learn what challenges they would face on the track, such as judging braking distances. These were then implemented into the game's AI. It supports Introversion Software's amBX gaming lights.

== Reception ==
Reception

Aggregate score
| Aggregator | Score | | | |
| Aggregator | PC | PS2 | PSP | Xbox |
|---|---|---|---|---|
| Metacritic | 84/100 | 82/100 | 76/100 | 84/100 |

Review scores
| Publication | Score | | | |
| Publication | PC | PS2 | PSP | Xbox |
|---|---|---|---|---|
| Edge | 8/10 | 8/10 | N/A | 8/10 |
| Electronic Gaming Monthly | N/A | 6.5/10 | N/A | 6.5/10 |
| Eurogamer | N/A | N/A | 7/10 | 9/10 |
| Famitsu | N/A | 28/40 | N/A | N/A |
| Game Informer | N/A | 8.25/10 | N/A | 8.25/10 |
| GamePro | N/A | 4.5/5 | N/A | 4.5/5 |
| GameSpot | 8.5/10 | 8.5/10 | N/A | 8.5/10 |
| GameSpy | N/A | 4/5 | N/A | 4/5 |
| IGN | 8.7/10 | 8.7/10 | N/A | 8.7/10 |
| Official U.S. PlayStation Magazine | N/A | 3/5 | N/A | N/A |
| Official Xbox Magazine (US) | N/A | N/A | N/A | 9/10 |
| PC Gamer (US) | 70% | N/A | N/A | N/A |
| The Sydney Morning Herald | 4/5 | 4/5 | N/A | 4/5 |

The game received "generally favourable reviews" on all platforms according to video game review aggregator website Metacritic, with scores ranging from 76/100 for the PlayStation Portable versions to 84/100 for the Microsoft Windows and Xbox versions. In Japan, where the PS2 version got a port on 24 January 2008, Famitsu gave it a score of all four sevens for a total of 28 out of 40. It was the second highest-grossing title in the UK in February 2006, and the sixth highest grossing the following month.

== See also ==
- V8 Supercars in video games
