= TOCA Race Driver =

2002 video game

- Developer: Codemasters
- Publisher: Codemasters
- Series: TOCA
- Platforms: PlayStation 2, Windows, Xbox
- Release: 23 August 2002: PlayStation 2; EU: 23 August 2002; AU: 27 August 2002; NA: 10 December 2002; Windows, Xbox; EU: 28 March 2003; AU: 4 April 2003 (Xbox); AU: 12 April 2003 (PC); NA: 15 April 2003
- Genre: Racing
- Modes: Single-player, multiplayer

TOCA Race Driver (DTM Race Driver in Germany, Pro Race Driver in North America and V8 Supercars: Race Driver in Australia) is a 2002 racing video game developed and published by Codemasters for PlayStation 2, Windows and Xbox. It is the fourth game in the TOCA series. The racing elements of the game continued to receive positive reviews and the game went straight to number one in the UK game charts. Xbox and PC conversions followed in March 2003, with a further Xbox version released several months later at budget price adding Xbox Live support.

While Xbox Live support for all original Xbox Live games was terminated in 2010, TOCA Race Driver is playable online on the revival online servers called Insignia and XLink Kai.

== Gameplay and plot ==
TOCA Race Driver features various racing disciplines and weather changes.

Race Driver took the game in a new direction, since the main game mode featured a plot (leading to the game being labelled as a "Car-PG") where the player would take on the role of a fictional race driver called Ryan McKane, trying to make a name for himself in a multitude of car championships, all the while under the shadow of his more successful older brother and haunted by the death of his father on the racetrack (as witnessed by Ryan as a child).

The British Touring Car Championship (TOCA) which gives the game series its name, returned for this game. The real-life championship had undergone a transformation after most of the manufacturers had pulled out, and crowd numbers dropped, so TOCA asked Codemasters to include the series to boost the audience interest. However, the return was short-lived. Many tracks were added, and some of the "World" tracks were not continued from TOCA 3, despite their popularity, such as Watkins Glen and Surfers Paradise. The game continued with random grid positions and no penalties for bad driving.

== Reception ==
Reception

Aggregate score
Aggregator	Score		
Aggregator	PC	PS2	Xbox
Metacritic	74/100	81/100	80/100

Review scores
Publication	Score		
Publication	PC	PS2	Xbox
Edge	N/A	7/10	N/A
Electronic Gaming Monthly	N/A	7.5/10	N/A
Eurogamer	8/10	7/10	N/A
Game Informer	N/A	9.25/10	9/10
GamePro	N/A	3/5	3/5
GameRevolution	N/A	N/A	B
GameSpot	7.1/10	7.6/10	7.7/10
GameSpy	2/5	4.5/5	4/5
GameZone	8/10	9.5/10	8.1/10
IGN	7.5/10	9.3/10	8.9/10
Official U.S. PlayStation Magazine	N/A	4.5/5	N/A
Official Xbox Magazine (US)	N/A	N/A	8/10
PC Gamer (US)	51%	N/A	N/A
Entertainment Weekly	N/A	B	N/A

The PlayStation 2 and Xbox versions received "favourable" reviews, while the PC version received "average" reviews, according to video game review aggregator website Metacritic.

In the UK, Official UK PlayStation 2 Magazine gave the PS2 version a score of eight out of ten and said that it was an "ultra-realistic racer with top visuals"; they also listed it in their top 100 games and awarded it a Bronze Medal.

== Sequel ==
A sequel, TOCA Race Driver 2 was released in April 2004 for Windows and Xbox and later for PlayStation 2 in October 2004. Two more platforms were also released: a mobile version was released only in North America in February 2005 and the PlayStation Portable version was released only in Europe in September 2005. The North American version also uses the redesigned Race Driver name.

Another Race Driver sequel was released in February 2006.

== See also ==
- V8 Supercars in video games
