= Project CARS 3 =

2020 racing video game

- North American cover art of Project CARS 3 featuring a Chevrolet Corvette C8, Mercedes-AMG GT R and Honda NSX
- Developer: Slightly Mad Studios
- Publisher: Bandai Namco Entertainment
- Series: Project CARS
- Platforms: PlayStation 4; Windows; Xbox One
- Release: WW: 28 August 2020
- Genre: Motorsport Simulator
- Modes: Single-player, multiplayer

Project CARS 3 is a racing video game developed by Codemasters subsidiary Slightly Mad Studios and published by Bandai Namco Entertainment. It was released on 28 August 2020 for PlayStation 4, Windows, and Xbox One. The game marks a departure from the realistic, motor simulation gameplay of the series' first two instalments, with the game featuring more arcade-style racing and simpler mechanics.

Project CARS 3 received mixed reviews from critics. It is also the last mainline instalment in the Project CARS series, as future development of the series was cancelled by Slightly Mad's owner, Electronic Arts, in November 2022. The game was delisted in August 2025 and the online servers were shut down in February 2026.

== Gameplay ==
Project CARS 3 introduces more customizable cars that are available to race over 140 global circuits. The game also features 24-hour cycles, various seasons, and weather effects. The career mode has been rebuilt, with the artificial intelligence being enhanced. The game also support VR on PC. According to CEO of Slightly Mad Studios Ian Bell, the game is a spiritual successor to the Need for Speed: Shift series, which was also developed by Slightly Mad Studios. Having been acquired by British video game developer and publisher Codemasters, which is known for the Formula One series, Colin McRae Rally series and the Dirt series, in November 2019, Project CARS 3 is expected to share some elements from Codemasters' similar genre video game series TOCA, or Grid. The game received its first game trailer on 3 June 2020. The game also features a refined multiplayer mode. New content includes cars such as the Audi TTS, Koenigsegg Jesko, Lotus Evija and the Bugatti Chiron, plus circuits such as Autódromo José Carlos Pace, Circuito de Jerez and Tuscany.

Unlike its predecessors, this game does not feature tyre wear or fuel depletion, and as such, there are no pit stops. This has prompted criticism from fans of the series.

== Development and release ==
Project CARS 3 was developed by Slightly Mad Studios and published by Bandai Namco Entertainment. The development began in the fall of 2018 after the commercial success of Project CARS 2. Instead of switching to parent company Codemasters's Ego engine, the game is still powered by the same engine as its predecessors. According to studio CEO Ian Bell, it could have been called Project CARS Sideways instead of Project CARS 3 to signpost the series heading in a different direction, but ultimately the call was overruled. The game was released on PlayStation 4, Windows, and Xbox One on 28 August 2020.

On 24 July 2025, it was announced that the game would be delisted from all digital storefronts on 24 August 2025, most likely due to expriring licenses. The game's online servers were also shut down on 24 February 2026.

== Reception ==
Reception

Aggregate scores
Aggregator	Score
Metacritic	PC: 68/100; PS4: 70/100; XONE: 69/100
OpenCritic	48% recommend

Review scores
Publication	Score
GameSpot	7/10
IGN	6/10
Jeuxvideo.com	13/20
PlayStation Official Magazine – UK	6/10
Push Square	6/10
Metro	8/10
Screen Rant	3/5
Hardcore Gamer	4/5

Project CARS 3 received "mixed or average" reviews from critics, according to review aggregator Metacritic. Fellow review aggregator OpenCritic assessed that the game received fair approval, being recommended by 48% of critics.

IGN's Luke Reilly said that: "Project CARS 3 is a racer so fundamentally different from its immediate forerunners it's bordering on unrecognisable. It abandons the sim racing sensibilities and adopts a radically different driving feel and a new career mode mostly made up of snack-sized racing and driving challenges. There's never a time when it feels like an actual sequel to Project CARS 2 – and that is disappointing."

Jacob Hull from Push Square gave a score of 6/10, claiming: "Project CARS 3 marks a significant departure for the series, abandoning most of its sim heritage in favour of arcade racing. Offering a variety of different cars and tracks, there's plenty of content on offer, making for a fun distraction, but it lacks the excitement we expect from wheel-to-wheel racing. It takes inspiration from all over the place, but it's perhaps most closely aligned with Sony's own DriveClub. It would seem, then, that the PS4 cycle is ending the way it began. We're just not sure we'd pick this over what's come before."

The PlayStation Official Magazine UK said it was a "patchy, unbalanced, and shallow racer with obvious technical issues". GameSpot criticised the AI, but said it had "a more arcade style of racing is one that makes the series approachable for the first time."

=== Sales ===
The game reached number 5 in the US physical sales chart, and 17 in the UK, selling 86% less than the previous game. The PlayStation 4 version of Project CARS 3 sold 2,404 copies within its first week on sale in Japan, making it the 24th bestselling retail game of the week in the country.

=== Awards ===
Year	Award	Category	Result
2020	Gamescom 2020	Best Simulation Game	Won
