= TOCA Touring Car Championship =

1997 video game

TOCA: Touring Car Championship
- PAL release of the PlayStation cover featuring the Audi A4 and Renault Laguna
- Developer: Codemasters
- Publishers: EU: Codemasters; NA: 3DO; WW: THQ (GBC)
- Series: TOCA
- Platforms: PlayStation; Microsoft Windows; Game Boy Color
- Release: PlayStation, Windows: EU: November 01, 1997; NA: September 03, 1998; JP: June 18, 1999; Game Boy Color: NA: November 14, 2000; EU: November 24, 2000
- Genre: Racing
- Modes: Single-player, multiplayer

TOCA: Touring Car Championship (called TOCA Championship Racing in North America) is a 3D racing video game licensed by series organisers TOCA, and developed and published by Codemasters for the PlayStation and Microsoft Windows platforms in 1997-1998. It was re-released by Codemasters for the Game Boy Color in 2000. It was the first entry in the eponymous series and was followed by TOCA 2 Touring Cars in 1998. The player takes control of a driver who races for one of the eight works teams that contested the 1997 British Touring Car Championship against fifteen AI competitors on one of the nine championship circuits. A championship mode is available for players with the objective of earning points to continue competing and unlocking new features.

Development of the game began in 1996 and continued for the next eighteen months during which Codemasters worked closely with the British Touring Car Championship's organiser TOCA to faithfully recreate the series in the virtual world. The game features former racing driver Tiff Needell as the commentator. Reception was generally positive with critics directing their praise at the gameplay and the excitement it gave the player. The game was a commercial success with 600,000 copies sold in Europe in the first six months of its release and was ranked third in the United Kingdom video game charts.

== Gameplay ==
=== PlayStation and PC ===
A typical race in the TOCA: Touring Car Championship in progress.

The player races against fifteen AI competitors for one of the eight work teams (each team has two drivers who compete for them). They participate on one of the nine circuits that feature in the championship. The vehicles in the game are super touring cars for which the player can select the gearbox setting to either automatic or manual. Cars in the game are either four-wheel drive, front-wheel drive or rear-wheel drive. Three types of views can be accessed: a close-up back-end view remotely from the car, a perspective from the engine compartment, and an internal view from the passenger compartment. Selecting a car places the player in the position of the first named driver for each team. That driver's name would then not appear in the race, and the player's name would appear instead. The TOCA Touring Car Championship offers various game modes: A race weekend consists of a qualifying session and the main race. The player may choose to start the event by choosing any of these events. The qualifying session offers the player three laps to record the fastest possible lap time for a better position on the starting grid. Should the player skip the qualifying session, the competitor is required to start at the back of the field.

Multiplayer allows up to two players on the PlayStation version or eight players on the PC version to complete in either split-screen or LAN. A single race allows the player to compete with a predefined car and circuit. The player can set the number of laps, the weather and the difficulty level, and may decide to play the game in multi-player, whereby all participants can choose to grant a speed boost to the losing player. At the beginning of the game, only two circuits are available; the others are unlocked by progressing in championship mode. The championship mode offers the player the opportunity to participate in the British Touring Car Championship. It is organised into twelve race meetings of two rounds each. The player can choose how long the season lasts. Unlike the PAL version of the game, the US version of the game has a "difficulty" option (standard/expert) for championship mode. Each round consists of a qualifying session and the main race. The player is required to earn 20 points to continue competing in the championship. However, any unsportsmanlike conduct is punishable with an on-screen warning. Points are deducted on a gradual scale after the player has received three warnings. Earning six of these warnings will lead to the player being disqualified from the race. Cups are awarded to the player based on his or her performances and allow for the unlocking of extra circuits, hidden cars and cheat codes. Time trial consists of the player recording the fastest possible lap time with that person selecting weather conditions. Once a reference time has been established, a phantom car is materialised, prompting the player to further improve on the previous best lap. During the game's operating period, players could publish their lap times on Codemasters's website and compare themselves to others.

=== Game Boy Color ===
The Game Boy Color version offers a different game system, due to the technical limitations of the platform. The game displays an isometric 3D view typical of the games on the console. The championship and time trial modes are unchanged although only one car per team is entered in the race. The simple racing mode allows the player to set options that are more restricted than in the PlayStation and Windows versions. All circuits in the game are unlocked from the start, without the need for the player to progress through championship mode to unlock them. The multiplayer mode offers the possibility for eight players to compete in turns.

== Development ==
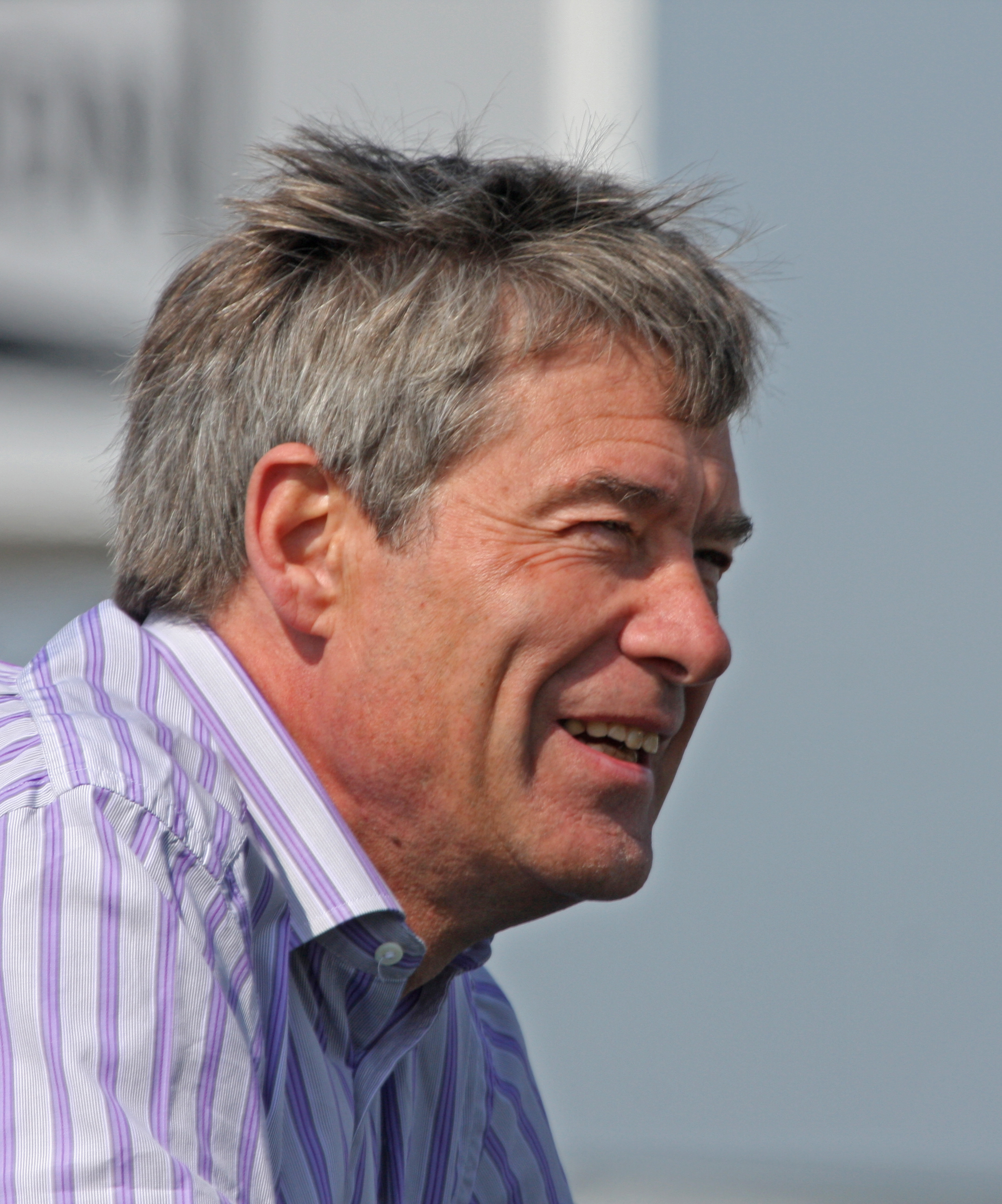
Tiff Needell (pictured in 2009) provided commentary to the English version of the game

Development of TOCA: Touring Car Championship began in 1996 by Codemasters and took eighteen months to complete. The team, led by Gavin Raeburn, consisted of twenty-six programmers who worked six-day weeks at the rate of fourteen hours per day during the final stages of game development. With the license from TOCA, the organiser of the British Touring Car Championship, Codemasters worked with the company to faithfully reproduce the characteristics of the championship; the names and teams of the series, cars with more or less equal capacities, and friction and collisions in the corners. The designers also represented the race cars accurately, showing the sponsors of the teams and the advertising hoardings present on each circuit. In order to realistically model the real life cars, each one was laser scanned with a precision of a quarter of a millimetre. These were textured under several conditions, depending on whether they were damaged or intact. In addition, graphic designers benefited from the topographic surveys of the Ordnance Survey, a non-ministerial department of the government of the United Kingdom responsible for mapping the United Kingdom, to model the circuits. These are also from different angles of view and each circuit was photographed before being modelled in 3D. Thus the game engine allows the player, like Destruction Derby, to leave the track and visit the circuit's surroundings. The game runs at a frame rate of twenty-five frames per second, detailed with 3,000 polygons.

A scale model of each car was scanned to create a 3D wire-frame model of approximately 120,000 vertices. Engine, gearboxes and road noise levels were sampled to ensure that the sound experienced corresponded accurately to the chosen camera angle. On the PC version, Codemasters admitted that the non-inclusion of a 3D accelerator card greatly hurt the graphics of the game. In the English version, commentary is provided before and after each of the races by the Top Gear presenter and former racing driver Tiff Needell. The game was released in Europe in November 1997 with other regions following in 1998.

In 1999, Codemasters and publisher THQ announced the preparation of a port of the game for the Game Boy Color in September but the release date was later postponed. At the Electronic Entertainment Expo 2000 in Los Angeles, developers Spellbound and Codemasters presented the TOCA Touring Car Championship port for the Nintendo handheld console.

=== Promotion ===
In the month before the game's release, Codemasters invited around forty journalists from across Europe to the Brands Hatch racing circuit in the English county of Kent. This was to introduce them to discover what the game was like and prove the realism of the simulation it contained. Thus, the journalists were able to experience the sensations on the console. Beforehand, they were driven around in BMW passenger cars by competitors of the British Formula Ford Championship and then were given the opportunity to drive several Formula Vee single seater vehicles. Then they executed slaloms in a race car while attempting not to drop a ball placed on a container that was attached to the bonnet. The journalists eventually tested TOCA Touring Car Championship under optimal simulation conditions by sitting in a bucket seat, which was near a giant television screen and a steering wheel.

== Critical reception ==
=== Reviews ===
Reception

Aggregate score
Aggregator	Score		
Aggregator	GBC	PC	PS
GameRankings	N/A	75%	83%

Review scores
Publication	Score		
Publication	GBC	PC	PS
AllGame	N/A	N/A	4/5
CNET Gamecenter	N/A	8/10	9/10
Consoles +	N/A	N/A	89%
Edge	N/A	N/A	8/10
GameSpot	N/A	N/A	7.8/10
Hyper	9/10	N/A	N/A
IGN	N/A	8.2/10	8/10
Jeuxvideo.com	15/20	N/A	18/20
PlayStation Official Magazine – UK	N/A	N/A	9/10
PC Accelerator	N/A	7/10	N/A
PC Gamer (US)	N/A	88%	N/A
PC PowerPlay	N/A	94%	N/A
Player One	N/A	N/A	85%
Total Advance	92%	N/A	N/A

TOCA Touring Car Championship received favourable reviews on both platforms according to the review aggregation website GameRankings. The British magazine Edge claimed that at the time of its release, there was not another PlayStation racing video game that "reached such a level of playability and pure excitement", judging that the quality of the graphics are the only negative point of the game. Ryan MacDonald of GameSpot wrote that TOCA Touring Car Championship has "the incredible gameplay and graphics of Gran Turismo, while having realistic damage to Destruction Derby cars", and proves to be "one of the best racing games", and also one of the most fun. In the French gaming press, the monthly Player One magazine was more critical and considered the game not strictly fun but felt it became interesting when the championship mode was played. Official UK PlayStation Magazine said the game was realistic and fun to play. They wrote that "the graphics are fast, detailed and liberally peppered with neat effects, and the sound is among the best to grace a racing sim". Finally, the magazine Consoles + had the same opinion, noting in particular that the effectiveness of the two-player mode was poor because of the game's fast-paced action.

For the PC port of the game, Ed Lomas of the Computer and Video Games magazine hailed the racing as "the most exciting in any game on PC and Playstation", although he found the game slightly "dull" compared to V-Rally and Formula 1 97. David Wildgoose of the Australian monthly PC PowerPlay called TOCA Touring Car Championship the "second best racing game ever" behind the 1996 MicroProse game Grand Prix 2 but disliked the arcade dimension of the game. IGN's Jaz Rignall wrote of his appreciation of "a enjoyable game that offers everything a racing game should offer: challenge, excitement and entertainment". As for the French publication Génération 4, it estimated that "TOCA marks especially by the originality of its subject" and considered it more realistic in terms of control than Screamer Rally, released on PC the same year.

Regarding the Game Boy Color port of TOCA Touring Car Championship, the reviewer for the English publication Total Advance considered the game as "the best driving experience that can be found, unless you buy your own car" and applauded it as "the cream of racing games on GBC". He particularly enjoyed the isometric view that is provided to the player. Jeuxvideo.com praised it as "a very good game [...] that does justice to the Game Boy and the series of TOCA". The French website welcomed the longevity of the championship and eight-player modes and believed that it showed that its realism was better represented on the Game Boy Color.

=== Sales ===
TOCA Touring Car Championship was released to a commercial success. In the first half of 1998, the PlayStation version sold 600,000 copies in Europe, and it ranked third in the United Kingdom official video game charts.

=== Awards ===
At the 1999 Milia festival in Cannes, the PlayStation version took home a "Gold" prize for revenues above €21 million in the European Union during the previous year. The PC version was nominated for the "Best Racing Game of the Year" award at IGN's Best of 1998 Awards, which went to Powerslide.

== Legacy ==
As it was published a few months before Gran Turismo, TOCA Touring Car Championship is seen by critics as a forerunner of automotive simulation racing video games, in spite of it being judged as graphically inferior to the 1994 game Ridge Racer. The game was the first instalment of an eponymous series that was followed by TOCA 2 Touring Cars in 1998. The TOCA Touring Car Championship game engine also served as the basis for the design of the 1998 rallying video game Colin McRae Rally. This production, which proved to be a critical and commercial success, is characterised by a soundtrack and graphics similar to its predecessor. Its success led to the production of an eponymous series, which lasted for twenty years.
