= Project CARS =

Racing video game series by Slightly Mad Studios

- Logo of Project CARS series, used in the first and second installments
- Genre: Racing simulation
- Developer: Slightly Mad Studios
- Publisher: Bandai Namco Entertainment
- Platforms: Microsoft Windows; PlayStation 4; Xbox One; Android; iOS
- First release: Project CARS; 6 May 2015
- Latest release: Project CARS GO; 23 March 2021

Project CARS is a sim racing video game series developed by Slightly Mad Studios and published by Bandai Namco Entertainment. The franchise was introduced in 2015 and received a sequel in 2017, followed by Project CARS 3 in 2020. Following the acquisition of Codemasters by Electronic Arts, development on the Project CARS series ended in November 2022.

== Games ==
Aggregate review scores As of 24 August 2020.
Game	Year	Metacritic
Project CARS	2015	PC: 84/100; PS4: 83/100; XONE: 81/100
Project CARS 2	2017	PC: 84/100; PS4: 82/100; XONE: 84/100
Project CARS 3	2020	PC: 68/100; PS4: 70/100; XONE: 69/100

=== Project CARS (2015) ===
The first video game of the series was initially released on 6 May 2015. It was available on Microsoft Windows, PlayStation 4, and Xbox One. A complete edition, titled Project CARS Game of the Year Edition, was launched on 6 May 2016. The game was generally well received upon release, and had sold 2 million copies as of October 2016.

=== Project CARS 2 (2017) ===
Project CARS 2 was announced as the sequel after the success of Project CARS. It features 140 track layouts at 60 different spots and 189 cars ranging from go-karts to Supercars, including Porsche, McLaren, Ferrari, Nissan, Aston Martin, Lamborghini, etc. It was available worldwide on 22 September 2017 for Microsoft Windows, PlayStation 4, and Xbox One platforms. The game received positive reviews, and won the Best Simulation Game award of Gamescom 2017.

=== Project CARS 3 (2020) ===
Project CARS 3 was announced in December 2018. In November 2019, Slightly Mad Studios, the developer of the franchise, was acquired by Codemasters, British video game developer and publisher known for Formula One series, Colin McRae Rally and Dirt, TOCA and Grid series, which means Codemasters now holds the rights to the Project CARS titles. Unlike previous games, it features arcade style gameplay and was created as a spiritual successor to Need for Speed: Shift. The game was released on 28 August 2020.

=== Project CARS GO (2021) ===
In May 2018, Slightly Mad Studios announced the spin-off title Project CARS GO for mobile devices, which is being co-developed by Gamevil. Like the main series, it would feature licensed cars and vehicle customisation. It was not until February 2021 when Gamevil confirms they would launch the game for Android and iOS devices on 23 March 2021. Prior to launch, the game had an open beta period for Android users in Finland, Denmark, Sweden, and the Netherlands from 26 January until 11 March.

== Future ==
The series was set for a fourth title sometime in 2024 but this was eventually cancelled by its owner Electronic Arts in November 2022.

The Project Cars engine was used in Automobilista 2.
