= Grid Legends =

2022 racing video game

- Cover art featuring Porsche 911 GT3 RS and Aston Martin Valkyrie AMR Pro with Yume Tanaka, Valentin Manzi, Ryan McKane, Marcus Ado and Nathan McKane in the background
- Developer: Codemasters (Note: Android, iOS, macOS and Nintendo Switch 2 ports developed and published by Feral Interactive)
- Publisher: Electronic Arts
- Director: Christopher Tudor-Smith
- Programmer: Steve Bennett
- Artist: John Lewis
- Writer: Brad Kane
- Composer: Ian Livingstone
- Series: Grid
- Engine: Ego Engine 4.0
- Platforms: Microsoft Windows; macOS; PlayStation 4; PlayStation 5; Xbox One; Xbox Series X/S; Meta Quest; iOS; Android; Nintendo Switch 2
- Release: Windows, PlayStation 4, PlayStation 5, Xbox One, Xbox Series X/S; WW: 25 February 2022; Meta Quest; WW: 12 January 2023; macOS; WW: 12 December 2023; iOS, Android; WW: 17 December 2024; Nintendo Switch 2; WW: 29 January 2026
- Genre: Racing
- Modes: Single-player, multiplayer

Grid Legends is a 2022 racing video game developed by Codemasters and published by Electronic Arts. It is the fifth installment in the Grid franchise. The game was released for Microsoft Windows, PlayStation 4, PlayStation 5, Xbox One and Xbox Series X/S on February 25, 2022, with versions for the Meta Quest 2 releasing on January 12, 2023, for iOS and Android devices on December 17, 2024, and for the Nintendo Switch 2 on January 29, 2026.

== Gameplay ==
Grid Legends contains more than 130 tracks to race on, ranging from real-life circuits like Brands Hatch, Indianapolis Motor Speedway, Suzuka International Racing Course and the return of Mount Panorama Circuit, to street circuits in various cities such as San Francisco, Paris, London, and Moscow. The game features more than 100 vehicles, including touring cars, tractor unit truck, open-wheel car, stadium trucks, drift cars, and even electric vehicles, to compete in arena ovals, on street circuits, or off-road tracks. For the first time in the series, players have the ability to create their own races, including custom routes, obstacles, vehicle restrictions, and rules.

Inspired by Netflix's documentary series Formula 1: Drive to Survive, the game includes a story-focused career mode for the first time in the series, entitled "Driven to Glory". Codemasters had previously opted to include a plot-focused career mode in F1 2021 with Braking Point. In Grid Legends, however, the mode is much more narrative-focused, with the story in particular focusing on an unnamed racing driver referred to only as "Driver 22" (named after the driver's race number and the fact that the game supports for up to 22 players). A number of professional actors have been hired to portray different characters in the game, utilizing the same virtual set technology used in the American Space Western television series The Mandalorian to insert the actors into virtual backgrounds. The cast includes actor Ncuti Gatwa, who portrays Valentin Manzi, number one driver for Voltz Racing.

Grid Legends also marks the first physical appearance of Nathan McKane, who has been a staple character throughout the Grid series, portrayed by Callum McGowan and reprising his role of number one driver for Ravenwest Motorsport. Other major characters include: Ryan McKane (Ravenwest Motorsport's owner and Nathan's uncle, portrayed by Joseph Millson; he previously appeared in TOCA Race Driver), Lara Carvalho (Ravenwest number two driver, portrayed by Nicole Castillo-Mavromatis), Marcus Ado (Seneca Racing's principal, portrayed by Miles Yekinni), Ajeet Singh (Seneca lead engineer, portrayed by Devesh Kishore), Yume Tanaka (Seneca number one driver and Driver 22's teammate, portrayed by Natsumi Kuroda) and Claire Webb (Grid TV's announcer, portrayed by Sara Vickers).

== Development and release ==
Grid Legends was announced at EA Play Live 2021. It is the fifth video game of the Grid series developed by Codemasters and the first instalment published by Electronic Arts, making this the series' debut on EA's Origin as their main platform, which is also playable on the EA desktop app. In addition to be released on Microsoft Windows, PlayStation 4 and Xbox One platforms, the game was also set to come to the ninth generation of video game consoles PlayStation 5 and Xbox Series X/S for the first time in the franchise. The game was released on February 25, 2022. On January 12, 2023, the game was released for the Meta Quest 2. On December 17, 2024, the game was released for iOS and Android devices. The online servers for the PS4, PS5, Xbox One, and Xbox Series X/S was shut down on September 11, 2026.

=== Updates and downloadable content ===
The game received numerous downloadable content packs, including pre-order bonus pack Seneca & Ravenwest Double Pack, which added new events to the Career mode and four additional cars (Aston Martin Vantage GT4, Porsche 962C, Ginetta G55 GT4 and Koenigsegg Jesko). Also available are the Mechanic Pass and the Voltz Pack, the latter of which includes two additional cars (Volkswagen Golf GTI and Audi R8 1:1).

The first major post-release downloadable content pack, Classic Car-Nage, was released on June 21, 2022. It features the returning Demolition Derby race type from Grid Autosport, along with a series of presentation cutscenes by Valentin Manzi, four courses and five cars made specifically for Demolition Derby.

The second downloadable content pack, Enduring Sprint, was released on October 25, 2022. It features the new Endurance race type, along with a series of cutscenes covering Lara Carvalho and Yume Tanaka competing as teammates at Seneca Racing, the first appearance of Fuji Speedway since TOCA Race Driver and four new cars, namely Autozam AZ-1, Bentley Continental GT3, Bentley Speed 8, and BMW V12 LMR.

The third downloadable content pack, The Rise of Ravenwest, was released on November 17, 2022. It features the returning Miami circuit from Grid 2 and four new cars, namely BMW 320 Turbo Group 5, Ford Mustang '67 Fastback, Plymouth GTX and Chevrolet Corvette C2, along with a series of cutscenes featuring a tell-all interview on the McKane's family in Grid history.

The fourth and final downloadable content pack, Winter Bash, was released on January 27, 2023. It features five new Okutama point-to-point drift courses and three new cars, namely Bugatti Bolide, BMW 2002 and a custom drift-tuned SRT Viper GTS, along with a series of presentation cutscenes by Ajeet Singh, with occasional help from Manzi.

== Reception ==
Reception

Aggregate score
Aggregator	Score
Metacritic	NS2: 83/100; PC: 75/100; PS5: 76/100; XSXS: 73/100

Review scores
Publication	Score
GamesRadar+	4/5
IGN	7/10
Push Square	7/10

Grid Legends received "generally favorable" reviews for Nintendo Switch 2, PlayStation 5 and Windows, and "mixed or average" reviews for the Xbox Series X/S version.

IGN gave the game a 7 out of 10, stating, "It's not obvious at first glance, but Grid Legends is a definite step up from Grid 2019, with a bigger collection of circuits, more race types, and some extremely clever hop-in multiplayer. It's not a dramatic leap, though, particularly as the reused car roster grows stale and the customisation options tread water." Eurogamer wrote, "There's significant duplication from 2019's series reboot, but the few additions are at least wilder and more specialised than that game's slightly more conservative platter," and praised the multiplayer, story mode, race creator mode, and atmosphere. Both outlets also heavily praised the game's newly unpredictable AI. Push Square gave the game 7 stars out of 10 and praised the core gameplay, number of cars and tracks, accessibility, and well-executed adaptive trigger usage while criticizing the story mode's narrative, unremarkable visuals, and repetitive music. GamesRadar+ gave it 4 stars out of 5 and lauded the tight controls and simcade-style racing while criticizing the "dodgy" AI and disappointing story.
