= Race Driver: Create & Race =

2007 video game

- European version cover art, featuring the Nissan 350Z and the Honda NSX
- Developer: Firebrand Games
- Publisher: Codemasters
- Designer: Mark Greenshields
- Series: TOCA
- Engine: Octane
- Platform: Nintendo DS
- Release: EU: September 28, 2007; NA: October 2, 2007; AU: October 18, 2007
- Genre: Racing
- Modes: Single-player, multiplayer

Race Driver: Create & Race (V8 Supercars 3: Create and Race in Australia) is a racing video game developed by Firebrand Games and published by Codemasters exclusively for Nintendo DS. It is part of the TOCA / Race Driver series.

== Modes ==
- World Tour Mode – The player races through a series of touring-car races from across the world. Reward points are gained to buy items such as extra championships, new challenges, cheats, track designer parts and customization parts in the Rewards shop.
- Pro Tour Mode – A harder version of World Tour mode, in which the other drivers are more skilled, damage is more realistic and the player has to drive with the manual gears.
- Simulation – This mode contains Free race, Time trial and Challenge mode.
- Track Designer – An innovative part of the game in which players create their own race track and can race it in Multiplayer championships.

== Development ==
Race Driver: Create and Race is the second racing game developed by Firebrand Games to run on the Octane game engine (after Cartoon Network Racing). The engine was upgraded to support a track editor and Firebrand Games would go on to reuse it for DS versions of Race Driver: Grid and Dirt 2.

== Reception ==
Reception

Aggregate scores
Aggregator	Score
GameRankings	78.47%
Metacritic	76/100

Review scores
Publication	Score
1Up.com	C+
Eurogamer	8/10
GamePro	3.75/5
GamesMaster	67%
GameSpot	7.5/10
GameZone	8.4/10
IGN	8.2/10
Nintendo Power	7.5/10
Nintendo World Report	8/10
Official Nintendo Magazine	83%

Race Driver: Create & Race was met with positive reception upon release; it has a score of 79% and 76 out of 100 according to GameRankings and Metacritic.

At Christmas 2007, the game was in IGN's Buyer's Guide for the DS, in which it was one of the ten titles in no particular order, but was the only racing game. Eurogamer's top 12 DS games for Christmas included Race Driver as well as being the only racing game on the list.

The game was IGN's Racing Game of the Year for the DS.
