= Project CARS (video game) =

2015 racing video game

- Developer: Slightly Mad Studios
- Publisher: Bandai Namco Entertainment
- Directors: Andy Tudor; Stephen Viljoen
- Producer: Pete Morrish
- Designer: Stephen Viljoen
- Programmer: Ged Keaveney
- Artist: Darren White
- Composer: Stephen Baysted
- Series: Project CARS
- Platforms: Microsoft Windows; PlayStation 4; Xbox One
- Release: Microsoft Windows: NA: 6 May 2015; AU: 8 May 2015; EU: 8 May 2015; PS4, Xbox One: AU: 7 May 2015; EU: 8 May 2015; NA: 12 May 2015
- Genre: Racing simulation
- Modes: Single-player, multiplayer

Project CARS is a motorsport racing simulator video game developed by Slightly Mad Studios and published and distributed by Bandai Namco Entertainment. It was released in May 2015 for Microsoft Windows, PlayStation 4, and Xbox One.

== Gameplay ==
=== Features ===
There are 74 drivable cars, over 30 unique locations with at least 110 different courses, of which 23 are real, with the remainder being fictional. For licensing reasons, some tracks are codenamed using their geographic location. In addition to real world racing circuits and fictional kart circuits, there are two fictional point-to-point roads inspired by Côte d'Azur and California Pacific Coast.

=== Physics simulation ===
Project CARS is intended to represent a realistic driving simulation. In order to differentiate the game from the established industry leaders, Gran Turismo and Forza Motorsport, Slightly Mad Studios' aim is a "sandbox" approach that allows the player to choose between a variety of different motorsports paths and grants immediate access to all included tracks and vehicles. Project CARS portrays racing events spanning multiple days, progressing from shakedown and qualifying runs to the race itself, while changes in weather and lighting conditions are simulated dynamically.

The game adopts an improved version of the Madness engine, which was the basis for the Need for Speed: Shift titles. More processing power available in modern computers allows for the introduction of a dynamic tire model named "SETA", rather than the steady-state model based on lookup tables, as seen in previous generation simulations. To accommodate differing skill levels, Slightly Mad Studios offers gamers (with or without a digital wheel) various driver aids and input filtering methods.

== Development ==
Project CARS, which stands for Community Assisted Racing Simulator, was made with a total sum of $5 million. Funding for the game was raised by the community and the developers themselves, without the financial aid of a traditional publisher. Through the purchase of Tool Packs players could contribute to development in roles including content creation, QA, and marketing media. Members gain special perks, depending on their purchased tool pack. Members will receive a share of game sales profits generated within the first three years after launch as compensation for their efforts, to be paid quarterly.

In addition to community feedback, Slightly Mad Studios have acquired the professional services of racing driver and Top Gear's former The Stig, Ben Collins, Clio Cup and European Touring Car Cup racing driver Nicolas Hamilton, and former Formula Renault 3.5 and current WEC driver Oliver Webb. Cars in the console versions of the game are made from 60,000 polygons.

On 26 August 2012 support for the Oculus Rift virtual reality headset was announced on the official forums. The announcement stated that at least one Oculus Rift Development Kit has been ordered. Members of the project are able to follow a link referenced in the forum post to read more details.

Sony's PlayStation 4 virtual reality headset PlayStation VR will also be supported.

It was released on 7 May 2015 in Europe and 12 May 2015 in America for Microsoft Windows, PlayStation 4, and Xbox One, while the Linux version was first delayed to later in 2015 and eventually cancelled. Project CARS was also originally due for release on the PlayStation 3, Xbox 360 and Wii U, but it was later announced that these versions had been cancelled. On 18 February 2015 it was announced that Project CARS would be delayed until 2 April 2015 for Europe, and eventually confirmed to be released on 7 May 2015 in Europe and Australia; 8 May 2015 in the UK; and 12 May 2015 in North America.

On 12 May 2016, the game was updated for compatibility with the HTC Vive virtual reality headset.

=== Cancellation of Wii U version ===
In May 2015, it was revealed that the Wii U version would be put on hold. Studio boss Ian Bell said that the game's latest build was struggling to run smoothly on Nintendo's platform – at a 720p resolution with a framerate of 23fps, and revealed that they are not allowed to release a game that is running below 30fps, but "finding that extra 25% frame time is currently looking impossible". In the official Forums he adds that the Wii U's market share was not worth the effort of porting. He explained that there was a possibility the game would be pushed for the Nintendo Switch, then known as the project NX. On 21 July 2015, Slightly Mad Studios informed the Nintendo Life news outlet that the Wii U version had been cancelled, with Ian Bell saying that the title was "simply too much" for the Wii U hardware to handle. Distribution partner Bandai Namco reaffirmed the cancellation. Despite Bell wishing to release the game on a Nintendo platform, in November 2016 it was confirmed that there were no plans for a Nintendo Switch port.

== Release ==
Project CARS was released in numerous different editions. In addition to the standard version of the game, the Project CARS Limited Edition was released at launch. This edition featured a book called "Project Cars: By Racers 4 Racers" and five extra cars; the Ford GT40 Mk IV, BMW M1 Procar, McLaren F1, Sauber C9, and the Mercedes-Benz AMG C63 Class Coupé DTM. Moreover, those who pre-ordered either version also received the Modified Car Pack which added three bonus cars; the Ruf CTR3 SMS-R, Pagani Zonda Cinque Roadster, and the Ariel Atom Mugen.

On 6 May 2016, Slightly Mad Studios released Project CARS Game of the Year Edition. This version features all the DLCs and free bonus content that was released and additionally adds two new cars - the Pagani Zonda Revolución and the Pagani Huayra BC - and the Nürburgring Nordschleife track in its 24-hour configuration.

On 3 October 2022, Project CARS was delisted from digital storefronts due to expiring car and track licenses. The game remains playable for those who own it physically, or purchased the game digitally prior to the delisting.

=== Downloadable content ===
The game was supported with both paid and free downloadable content (DLC) upon release. Project CARS was initially planned to follow the season-pass model but plans for that were replaced with a system called "On-Demand." On-Demand was described as allowing a "commitment to keeping Project CARS up-to-date with the greatest, freshest, and most critical content whilst also allowing players to pick and choose the cars & tracks they want - without being locked in to a pre-paid scheme."

The first DLC was the Limited Edition Upgrade, released in June 2015, which added five cars already featured in the Project CARS Limited Edition. It was followed by the Racing Icons Car Pack, Modified Car Pack (which was also available as bonus content for the pre-order version of the game) and Old vs New Car Pack, all of which added new cars to the game. Still in 2015, the developers released the Audi Ruapuna Speedway Expansion, Aston Martin Track Expansion and the Classic Lotus Track Expansion which added new cars and four new racetracks: Mike Pero Motorsport Park, the historic version of Hockenheimring and Silverstone, Rouen-Les-Essarts and a fictional track called "Mojave Test Track". The Japanese Car Pack added new cars from Toyota, Mitsubishi and Scion, while the Renault Sport Car Pack featured five new Renault cars. In 2016, Slightly Mad released the Stanceworks Track Expansion, which added a new fictional track called "Bannochbrae" and the US Car Pack, which adds the Chevrolet Corvette C7.R and the Cadillac ATS-V.R GT3, together with the Dallara DW12 and the Ford Fusion stock car. The last DLC released in 2016 was the Pagani Nürburgring Combined Track Expansion, which contains the bonus content featured in the Project Cars Game of the Year Edition.

== Reception ==
=== Critical reception ===
Reception

Aggregate score
Aggregator	Score
Metacritic	PC: 83/100; PS4: 83/100; XONE: 81/100

Review scores
Publication	Score
Destructoid	XONE: 7/10
Electronic Gaming Monthly	PS4: 7.0/10
Game Informer	PS4: 8.5/10
GameSpot	PC: 8/10
GamesRadar+	XONE: 3.5/5
IGN	PS4: 8.9/10
Official Xbox Magazine (US)	XONE: 70%
PC Gamer (UK)	PC: 83/100
PC PowerPlay	PC: 7/10
Play	PS4: 6/10
Shacknews	PC: 60%
PlayStation Universe	PS4: 8/10
National Post	PC: 8.0/10
Digital Spy	PS4: 4/5
NY Daily News	XONE: 3/5
New Game Network	PC: 72/100
GameCritics.com	PC: 6.5/10
Slant Magazine	PS4: 3/5

Project CARS was generally well received upon release. Gaming critic Matthew Kato of Game Informer stated: "The game joins a sim-racing field alongside already-established competitors like Gran Turismo and Forza, but it also does things its own way, challenging the ways of the past." Destructoid's Brett Makedonski praised the graphics and wrote: "One aspect of Project CARS that never fails to impress is its aesthetic. Everything is stunningly gorgeous at all times, even when the sun blinds you as you're trying to corner."

However, some complained of bugs, including PSU.com's Simon Sayers, who said: "During packed starting grids on some courses, they'll bunch up around the first corner and get tangled up like novices holding up everyone behind them."

During the 19th Annual D.I.C.E. Awards, the Academy of Interactive Arts & Sciences nominated Project CARS for "Racing Game of the Year".

=== Sales ===
In the first week of physical sales in the UK, Project CARS sold 63 percent of its total on the PlayStation 4 console, with 31 percent on the Xbox One and 6 percent on the PC. By 5 June 2015, the game had sold one million copies. By October 2016, the game had sold 2 million units. The game was made free from February 16 - March 16, 2017 with the Xbox Games with Gold program.

== Sequels ==
The sequel was announced on 22 June 2015. The sequel includes more tracks and modes such as rallycross. There are over 170+ cars at release and 60 locations all featuring Live Track 3.0 and a 24-hour day-night cycle. The sequel was released on 22 September 2017 and features new vehicle types and motorsport classes including Rallycross, IndyCar, and Oval. In May 2018, Slightly Mad Studios announced the mobile spin-off Project CARS GO, which is being developed by Gamevil. It will feature licensed cars and vehicle customisation, and released in March 2021. In 2020, Slightly Mad Studios announced Project CARS 3 which was released on August 28 of the same year.
