= Fast & Furious Crossroads =

2020 racing video game

- Cover art featuring Dodge Charger, Pontiac Firebird, and Ford Mustang being chased by a hovercraft with an explosion of a police car flying
- Developer: Slightly Mad Studios
- Publisher: Bandai Namco Entertainment
- Director: Andy Tudor
- Composer: Stephen Baysted
- Series: Fast & Furious
- Platforms: PlayStation 4; Windows; Xbox One
- Release: August 7, 2020
- Genres: Racing, action role-playing
- Modes: Single-player, multiplayer

Fast & Furious Crossroads is a 2020 racing action role-playing game developed by Slightly Mad Studios and published by Bandai Namco Entertainment. Based on the Fast & Furious franchise, the game bridges the story between the films The Fate of the Furious (2017), Hobbs & Shaw (2019), and F9 (2021). The game was scheduled for release on PlayStation 4, Windows, and Xbox One in May 2020, but was delayed to August 7 as a result of the COVID-19 pandemic. Upon release, the game received negative reviews from critics.

== Gameplay ==
Fast & Furious Crossroads is set across global locations and features main characters from the Fast & Furious film franchise. The game offers a new storyline and action, and features a wide selection of cars. In addition to the single-player mode, which focuses on the story, a multiplayer mode is also available in the game.

While the majority of Fast & Furious Crossroads is focused on racing, players must also fight enemies and avoid traps by using equipped weapons on their cars.

== Cast ==
- Vin Diesel as Dominic Toretto, a former criminal and professional street racer who has retired and settled down with his wife, Letty, and his son, Brian Marcos.
- Michelle Rodriguez as Letty Ortiz, Dom's wife, and a former criminal and professional street racer.
- Tyrese Gibson as Roman Pearce, an ex-habitual offender, expert street racer and a member of Dom's team.
- Sonequa Martin-Green as Vienna Cole.
- Asia Kate Dillon as Cameron "Cam" Stone.
- Imari Williams as Lamar, Roman's friend.
- Christian Lanz as Sebastian, Vienna's friend from Spain.
- Andres Aguilar as Mauricio, a Spanish street racer.
- Peter Stormare as Ormstrid, the man who owns a business enterprise called "OCM".
- Tamika Simpkins as Salome.
- Usman Ally as Kai.

== Development ==
The game was announced during The Game Awards 2019 and was set to be launched in May 2020 for PlayStation 4, Windows, and Xbox One following the release of F9 to theaters. However, the COVID-19 pandemic forced both works to postpone. On May 27, 2020, it was announced that the game would be released on August 7, 2020.

Bandai Namco announced that the game would be delisted from all platforms by the end of April 2022, with all sales ending on April 29.

== Reception ==
Reception

Aggregate scores
Aggregator	Score
Metacritic	PC: 34/100; PS4: 35/100; XONE: 49/100
OpenCritic	4% recommend

Review scores
Publication	Score
4Players	PC: 42% PS4: 40%
Destructoid	3/10
Easy Allies	4/10
Eurogamer	Avoid
Game Informer	5/10
IGN	4/10
PC Games (DE)	3/10
Push Square	3/10
Metro	2/10

Fast & Furious Crossroads received "generally unfavorable" reviews on all platforms according to review aggregator website Metacritic. Fellow review aggregator OpenCritic assessed that the game received weak approval, being recommended by only 4% of critics.

IGN gave the game a 4 out of 10, stating that it is "short, shallow, and surprisingly simple, and it's nothing less than a crashing disappointment in virtually every department".
