= World of Speed =

- Developers: Slightly Mad Studios, My.com, Saber Interactive, Redemption Ark
- Publisher: Mad Dog Games LLC
- Platform: Microsoft Windows
- Release: Early access: WW: August 22, 2017
- Genre: Racing
- Mode: Multiplayer

World of Speed was a massively massive multiplayer online action racing video game initially developed by Slightly Mad Studios and My.com and subsequently by Saber Interactive, for Microsoft Windows. World of Speed was initially planned as a free-to-play and to be released in 2014. In January 2017, the developers closed the community forums and released a statement that the game was "not yet good enough for our players" and that "the project will be under-going a substantial revision". In August 2017, the game was re-released on Steam as an early access title. However, after a November 13, 2018 announcement on Steam, World of Speed shut down its servers on December 25, 2018, rendering the game unplayable.

== Gameplay ==
World of Speed offered both a solo-player based and a team-based gameplay, in which two teams vied for control of real world circuits and street locations in London, Moscow and Monaco to start. The game featured a free-for-all format with destructible open environments and no rules. Players created or joined clubs with others and competed in two versus two or four versus four battles to accomplish the maximum point value and conquer the area. In World of Speed, players earned rewards for successfully completing challenges including clean turns and drafting other cars, in addition to finishing first. These rewards were later used to upgrade cars and become more competitive in the next event. The game required offensive and defensive tactics, as each player were able to track the challenges of rival vehicles and possibly slam into them to prevent their success.

The game was planned to expand its car range. The different cars vastly ranged from everyday rides, tuners, exotics, muscle cars to fast supercars with hefty performance. It also featured car customization, both in looks and performance. The custom garages and customization options gave players tools to build exactly what they want. A variety of load-outs were available for numerous car models, with new parts and items awarded as players earn more experience during the races. Players who played as a club could get to a stage where if they have enough winnings, they were able to customize their own track to host races on. The track could be set up with different logos and emblems for the specific racing club.

The game's initial racing modes were Circuit, Sprint, Drag and Drift stages, including social in-game events such as Clubs where players and teams could communicate and compete in different types of team-based gameplay modes. Players who achieved a certain level in the game as a club gained ownership of the course. Locations could then be fought over in the team-based game mode such as Territory Wars. The Airfield was a non-competitive zone where players can show off their cars, meet with clubs, and take a look at the upgraded cars others are driving. Most of the racing tracks in World of Speed consisted of different stages, with different levels of difficulty. Some parts/stages of each track had long straight high-speed roads, while others have more turns and elevation (e.g. mountain passes) and sharp hairpin turns. This was meant to encourage players to practice driving and make them carefully think through the best driving styles and driving techniques, as well as the car of their choice. There were fifteen racing tracks in World of Speed.
