= Slightly Mad Studios =

British video game company

Slightly Mad Studios Ltd.
- Type: Subsidiary
- Industry: Video games
- Predecessor: Blimey! Games
- Founded: January 2009; 17 years ago
- Founder: Ian Bell
- Headquarters: London, England
- Products: Need for Speed: Shift series; Project CARS series
- Parent: Codemasters (2019–present)

Slightly Mad Studios Ltd. was a British video game developer based in London. Founded in 2009, it was best known for the Project CARS series of racing games that it developed from 2015 until the series' discontinuation in 2022. Codemasters acquired Slightly Mad Studios in 2019 and was itself acquired by Electronic Arts in 2021.

== History ==
On 12 January 2009, Ian Bell acquired the business and assets of Blimey! Games from bankrupt parent 10tacle Studios. In September 2009, Slightly Mad Studios released Need for Speed: Shift with Electronic Arts. Its sequel Shift 2: Unleashed was announced in November 2010 and released in March 2011.

The company uses a distributed development structure, with developers living across the world and working remotely. Slightly Mad was ranked as the 17th most successful developer in the Develop 100 list for 2010.

In 2012, the company released Test Drive: Ferrari Racing Legends, which focuses on Ferrari's history across Formula One, rallying and sports cars.

In 2015, Slightly Mad launched Project CARS, a community-developed racing simulator. In 2017, Slightly Mad Studios released the sequel Project CARS 2. This title was developed using community-based development, pre-alpha testing, and funding, in an attempt to bypass normal publishing costs. This was the first title of a series of similarly developed games. Project CARS was featured in professional videogaming competitions by the ESL from 2015 to 2018.

On 2 January 2019, CEO and founder of Slightly Mad Studios, Ian Bell, announced via Twitter that the company would be creating its own video game console, which would have been called Mad Box. Bell claimed that the console would be "the most powerful console ever built", saying that it would be capable of running games at 4K resolution, at up to 120 FPS, and will support most major virtual reality headsets at 60 FPS per eye. It's considered that the console should be equivalent to a "very fast PC 2 years from now". The company estimated that the console would be released in 2022. In addition to their console, Bell announced that the company would give developers free access to its proprietary game engine to develop games for their console. The company does not currently intend to have exclusive titles for their console.

On 25 May 2019, it was announced that upcoming racing title Automobilista 2 developed by Reiza Studios will be using the Madness engine developed by Slightly Mad Studios and used for Project CARS 2, then the game has released a year later, at the end of June. Slightly Mad Studios was acquired by Codemasters in November 2019 for about US$30 million. This includes the rights to the Project CARS series and a yet-unannounced game. On 28 August 2020 Slightly Mad Studios released Project CARS 3, three weeks after the publisher launched Fast & Furious Crossroads.

In February 2021, Codemasters was, in turn, acquired by Electronic Arts. Slightly Mad Studios developed a free-to-play mobile Project CARS game, Project CARS Go, which was released by Gamevil in March 2021. The game was withdrawn from sale in October that year, followed by the shutdown of its services in November. Also in October, Bell left the studio. Under Electronic Arts, Project CARS and Project CARS 2 were removed from sale in 2022 as licenses for tracks and cars expired. On 8 November 2022, the publisher announced that it would discontinue the Project CARS series and move affected Slightly Mad Studios staff to other projects. Bell offered to hire affected employees under his new company, Straight4.

== Games ==
Year	Game	Publisher
2009	Need for Speed: Shift	Electronic Arts
2011	Shift 2: Unleashed	Electronic Arts
2012	Test Drive: Ferrari Racing Legends	Rombax Games
2015	Project CARS	Bandai Namco Entertainment
2016	Red Bull Air Race: The Game	Wing Racers Sports Games
2017	World of Speed	Mad Dog Games LLC
2017	Project CARS 2	Bandai Namco Entertainment
2020	Fast & Furious Crossroads	Bandai Namco Entertainment
2020	Project CARS 3	Bandai Namco Entertainment
2021	Project CARS Go	Gamevil
