= TOCA 2: Touring Cars =

1998 video game

- Developer: Codemasters
- Publisher: Codemasters
- Series: TOCA
- Platforms: PlayStation, Windows
- Release: PlayStation: UK: 27 November 1998; Windows: UK: 12 March 1999; NA: 11 November 1999
- Genre: Racing
- Modes: Single-player, multiplayer

TOCA 2: Touring Cars (TOCA 2: Touring Car Challenge in North America) is a British racing video game developed and published by Codemasters for PlayStation and Microsoft Windows. It is the second game in the TOCA series, based on the 1998 season of the British Touring Car Championship. Mainly an annual franchise update of cars and tracks, the game added more detailed graphics, physics, multiplayer modes and other minor features. Realistic tracks were added, and support races such as Ford Fiestas, Formula Ford and others also arrived. The level of car damage possible during a race was also enhanced, which was a significant selling point compared with the likes of Gran Turismo which had no damage model at the time.

== Gameplay ==
Gameplay screenshot (PlayStation)

The game modes include the support races such as Formula Ford and the Ford Fiesta Championships, a test track mode where the player tests any car on certain variations of the test track, a Championship mode which is dependent on the length with the difficulty selected, a feature new to the game is the support cars are able to be chosen with the colour the player prefers. A challenge mode is included to see how fast the player can get to the checkpoints in a limited amount of time. The single race mode allows the player to select the track to race on, as well as the weather conditions, laps raced and allowance for computer cars for one or more players. Similar to the first game, once the players select a car, they replace a driver and partner the other driver, but unlike the first TOCA game, this time they replace the second team driver, not the first.

The standard cars featured are the Audi A4, Ford Mondeo, Honda Accord, Nissan Primera, Peugeot 406, Renault Laguna, Vauxhall Vectra and Volvo S40. The support cars are the AC Superblower, Ford Fiesta, Formula Ford, Grinnall Scorpion, Jaguar XJ220, Lister Storm and TVR Speed 12.

All the tracks used in the various championships, including the main BTCC championship, are real racing tracks in Great Britain. These are as follows: Thruxton; Silverstone; Donington Park; Brands Hatch; Oulton Park; Croft; Snetterton; and Knockhill. There are bonus tracks and cars which can be accessed through the championship mode.

TOCA 2 for Windows also has the ability to import skins for each car. They can be edited using any paint/drawing program.

TOCA 2: Touring Cars (the United Kingdom)

=== Multiplayer ===
The multiplayer mode (known as Linkup Game) allows for two or more players to race on any circuit and also in the Championship mode. TOCA 2 is notable for being one of only four PlayStation games (the others being Wipeout 3: Special Edition, Ridge Racer Type 4 and Andretti Racing) to feature a four-player mode using the PlayStation's link cable and split-screen at the same time - i.e., four players compete against each other simultaneously using two PlayStation consoles, with two players per console and connected to two televisions.

== Soundtrack ==
The main menu background music features "Retro", and the opening video "Soundclash" by E-Z Rollers. Other versions feature "Sole Sentiment" by Ratman in the opening intro.

== Reception ==
Reception

Aggregate score
Aggregator	Score	
Aggregator	PC	PS
GameRankings	78%	79%

Review scores
Publication	Score	
Publication	PC	PS
AllGame	2.5/5	3/5
CNET Gamecenter	8/10	N/A
Edge	N/A	9/10
Game Informer	N/A	6.5/10
GameFan	91%	N/A
GamePro	3.5/5	N/A
GameSpot	8.2/10	5.4/10
IGN	5.5/10	8/10
Next Generation	N/A	4/5
PlayStation Official Magazine – UK	N/A	9/10
Official U.S. PlayStation Magazine	N/A	4.5/5
PC Accelerator	6/10	N/A
PC Gamer (US)	83%	N/A
The Cincinnati Enquirer	1.5/4	1.5/4

The game received "favorable" reviews on both platforms according to video game review aggregator GameRankings. Official UK PlayStation Magazine said the PlayStation version was an improvement on the original game, with many tracks, but that "the new cars felt tacked on". Rick Sanchez of NextGen said of the same console version, "Hands down, TOCA 2 [is] one of the best touring-car sims available, and one of the best new driving games for PlayStation."

The PC version was nominated for PC PowerPlay's "Best Driving/Racing" award, which went to Grand Theft Auto 2.
