= TOCA Race Driver 2 =

2004 video game

- Cover art featuring Formula Ford, Ford GT, and DTM cars
- Developers: Codemasters; Sumo Digital (PSP)
- Publisher: Codemasters
- Series: TOCA
- Platforms: Xbox, Windows, PlayStation 2, Mobile, PlayStation Portable
- Release: 13 April 2004: Xbox; NA: 13 April 2004; AU: 15 April 2004; EU: 23 April 2004; Windows; NA: 21 April 2004; EU: 23 April 2004; AU: 1 May 2004; PlayStation 2; NA: 5 October 2004; AU: 7 October 2004; EU: 15 October 2004; Mobile; NA: 5 February 2005; PlayStation Portable; PAL: 1 September 2005
- Genre: Racing
- Modes: Single-player, multiplayer

TOCA Race Driver 2 (DTM Race Driver 2 in Germany and V8 Supercars Australia 2 in Australia) is a racing video game developed and published by Codemasters for Xbox, Windows, PlayStation 2, Mobile and PlayStation Portable. It is the fifth game in the TOCA series.

== Gameplay ==
The career mode offers a wider selection of championships than previous games, featuring the likes of Supertruck and Rallycross in addition to the traditional touring car formats. However, not for the first time in the series, the British Touring Car Championship was not included, yet the franchise continued to license the TOCA name in the title. In addition, online play was featured heavily, with support for up to 8 players on Xbox Live until 15 April 2010. TOCA Race Driver 2 is now playable online again on the replacement Xbox Live servers called Insignia.

The PC version of the game features 31 licensed and fictional global race locations offering 48 tracks. These include Hockenheimring from the German DTM series and Surfers Paradise from the Australian V8 Supercars series. The PS2 version features an additional track, Catalunya. The PlayStation 2 version also allows up to 8 PS2 online players.

Two PSP conversions were released in 2005 and 2006; the first being TOCA Race Driver 2 in Europe and Japan, and the second being Race Driver 2006 in the US. The game continued to use a scripted career mode as introduced in the previous Race Driver game, but dropped the Ryan McKane character. Story-developing cutscenes were played out from a first-person perspective, with other characters never addressing the user by name (similar to the storytelling method of later Need for Speed titles). The Mobile phone version was released only in the U.S. a few months later.

== Reception ==
Reception

Aggregate score
Aggregator	Score			
Aggregator	PC	PS2	PSP	Xbox
Metacritic	81/100	(AU) 83/100 (US) 82/100	84/100	(AU) 90/100 (US) 82/100

Review scores
Publication	Score			
Publication	PC	PS2	PSP	Xbox
Edge	8/10	N/A	N/A	8/10
Electronic Gaming Monthly	N/A	N/A	N/A	8.33/10
Eurogamer	N/A	N/A	8/10	9/10
Famitsu	N/A	30/40	31/40	N/A
Game Informer	N/A	7.5/10	N/A	7.5/10
GamePro	N/A	N/A	N/A	4.5/5
GameSpot	7.7/10	8.2/10	N/A	8.2/10
GameSpy	4.5/5	N/A	N/A	N/A
GameZone	N/A	8.7/10	N/A	8.7/10
IGN	8.2/10	8.2/10	N/A	8.2/10
Official U.S. PlayStation Magazine	N/A	4/5	N/A	N/A
Official Xbox Magazine (US)	N/A	N/A	N/A	7.8/10
PC Gamer (US)	75%	N/A	N/A	N/A
The Sydney Morning Herald	N/A	4/5	4/5	N/A
The Times	4/5	N/A	N/A	4/5

The game received "generally favourable reviews" on all platforms except the Australian Xbox version, which received "universal acclaim", according to video game review aggregator website Metacritic. In Japan, Famitsu gave it a score of two eights, one seven and one eight for the PSP version, and two eights and two sevens for the PlayStation 2 version.

TOCA Race Driver 2 received a runner-up position in GameSpot's 2004 "Best Driving Game" award category across all platforms, losing to Burnout 3: Takedown.

== See also ==
- Race Driver 2006
- V8 Supercars in video games
