= Grid 2 =

2013 video game

- Covet art featuring the McLaren MP4-12C, Chevrolet Corvette (C6), and Pagani Huayra.
- Developer: Codemasters Southam
- Publishers: Codemasters; Feral Interactive (OS X)
- Series: Grid
- Engine: EGO Engine 3.0
- Platforms: Microsoft Windows, PlayStation 3, Xbox 360, OS X
- Release: Microsoft Windows, PlayStation 3 & Xbox 360: NA: 28 May 2013; AU: 30 May 2013; EU: 31 May 2013; OS X: WW: 25 September 2014
- Genre: Racing
- Modes: Single-player, multiplayer

Grid 2 (known in Japan as Race Driver Grid 2) is a 2013 racing video game developed and published by Codemasters for Microsoft Windows, PlayStation 3, Xbox 360. It is the second game in the Grid series. Feral Interactive released the Reloaded Edition for OS X in September 2014. A sequel, Grid Autosport, was released in 2014. The game's online servers were shut down on 16 March 2026.

== Gameplay ==
The game includes numerous real world locations and cities such as Paris. It also includes motor vehicles spanning four decades. In addition, it includes a new handling system that developer Codemasters has dubbed "TrueFeel", which aims to hit a sweet spot between realism and accessibility. Races do not include a first person cockpit view. The popular gamemode "Drift" was shown in a gameplay preview by Codemasters.

Drivers are given certain cars before some race modes, and can unlock others through other vehicle challenges. Car liveries can be customised by the player, using preset graphic designs adapted with colours or varying shades.

=== World Series Racing ===
World Series Racing (WSR) is a highly competitive racing event that races on various tracks on various continents around the globe. It also features a mode called "LiveRoutes" where the circuit track dynamically changes with no track map. It features race types including Race, Time Attack, Drift, Eliminator, Checkpoint, Touge, and Vehicle Challenges.

A player assumes the role of a new driver who is enlisted by Patrick Callahan, an investor, to help launch the WSR by challenging drivers of racing clubs. Winning races against drivers in established clubs in North America, Europe and Asia gains more fans for the series, and leads to drivers from those clubs agreeing to join the WSR.

== Marketing ==
In May 2013 there was a single £125,000 special edition release of the game by Codemasters which included a BAC Mono supercar featuring a Grid themed paint job and a tour of the BAC factory.

Grid 2 sponsored Matt Kenseth's No. 18 GameStop Toyota for the NASCAR Nationwide Series' 5-hour Energy 200 at Dover International Speedway.

== Reception ==
Reception

Aggregate score
Aggregator	Score
Metacritic	(PC) 80/100 (PS3) 82/100 (X360) 78/100

Review scores
Publication	Score
Destructoid	6/10
Game Informer	8.25/10
GameRevolution	8/10
GameSpot	8.5/10
GamesRadar+	4/5
Hardcore Gamer	4/5
IGN	8/10
Joystiq	3/5
PC Gamer (US)	82/100
Push Square	6/10
The Guardian	4/5

Grid 2 received "generally favorable reviews", according to review aggregator Metacritic.

IGN wrote positively about the game's graphics, audio, and gameplay, ultimately concluding, "A well-curated car list, a great sense of speed, and a well-thought out career mode combine in a racer that is a lot of fun to play through." Game Informer lauded the bespoke nature of the World Series Racing mode, alternate track routes, and multiplayer, and noted that it was not particularly innovative. PC Gamer wrote, "for all its top-class visuals and excellent handling, somehow the game doesn't seem to believe that just racing is interesting enough on its own," criticizing the title's threadbare story while praising the realistic AI and variety of modes. Destructoid, by contrast, was disappointed by the lack of sim gameplay, and wrote, "instead offering a stripped-down version of itself that is filled with lazy design, unfair AI opponents, special ESPN 'live' broadcasts that no one really asked for, and to top it all off, its bizarrely irritating narrator and loudly drunk or completely apathetic fans." Push Square thought similarly, calling the game a fun but safe racer lacking both impact and identity, in contrast to its predecessor. GameSpot praised the audio, visuals, handling, multiplayer, and event variety while taking issue with the lack of difficulty customization and the presence of occasional frame drops. GamesRadar+ liked the racer's intensity, visuals, competition variety, and amount of content, while citing minor issues such as the lack of a cockpit view, single-player car upgrades, and initially jarring handling.

During the 17th Annual D.I.C.E. Awards, the Academy of Interactive Arts & Sciences nominated Grid 2 for "Racing Game of the Year".

== Bibliography ==
1. Kato, Matthew (8 August 2012). "Grid 2". Game Informer. Archived from the original on 11 August 2012.
2. Robinson, Martin (3 August 2012). "Grid 2 teased by Codies". Eurogamer. Archived from the original on 5 August 2012.
3. Dale, Alex (8 August 2012). "GRID 2: The sequel's finally confirmed – first play, first details". Computer and Video Games. Archived from the original on 11 August 2012.
4. Brown, Nathan (8 August 2012). "Grid 2 announced". Edge Magazine. Archived from the original on 9 August 2012.
5. Boxer, Steve (8 August 2012). "Grid 2 – hands-on preview". The Guardian. Archived from the original on 9 March 2016.
6. Stuart, Keith (8 August 2012). "GRID 2 announced at last". The Guardian. Archived from the original on 9 March 2021.
7. Krupa, Daniel (3 August 2012). "Codemasters Teases Grid 2". IGN.
8. Gera, Emily (8 August 2012). "'Grid 2' officially announced with debut trailer". The Verge. Archived from the original on 10 August 2012.
9. de Matos, Xav (3 August 2012). "Grid 2 announcement teased". Joystiq. Archived from the original on 6 August 2012.
10. Walton, Mark (8 August 2012). "Grid 2: Street Racing For The COD Addicted". Gamespot. Archived from the original on 9 August 2012.
11. Kamen, Matt (8 August 2012). "Grid 2: On the Right Track". IGN.
12. Welsh, Oli (8 August 2012). "Grid 2 Preview: No Assists Please, We're British". Eurogamer. Archived from the original on 21 March 2019.
13. Bramwell, Tom (8 August 2012). "Codemasters responds to criticism about loss of in-car view in Grid 2". Eurogamer. Archived from the original on 11 August 2012.
14. Yin-Poole, Wesley (8 August 2012). "Grid 2 announced with debut trailer and screenshots". Eurogamer. Archived from the original on 11 August 2012.
