= Race Driver 2006 =

2006 video game

- Developer: Sumo Digital
- Publisher: Codemasters
- Series: TOCA
- Platform: PlayStation Portable
- Release: NA: 6 June 2006
- Genre: Racing game
- Modes: Single-player, multiplayer

Race Driver 2006 is a racing video game developed by Sumo Digital and published by Codemasters exclusively for PlayStation Portable. It is the expanded US release of TOCA Race Driver 2.

== Features ==
- Featuring 15 different motorsports—including:
  - GT Sports Car Racing
  - Street Racing
  - Rally
  - DTM
  - V8 Supercars
  - Global GT Lights
  - Rally Cross
  - Formula Ford
  - Open Wheel Grand Prix
  - Classic Car Racing
  - Super Truck Racing
  - Stock Car Oval Racing
  - Ice Racing
  - Convertible Racing
  - and Performance Cars
- 30 different global championships
- More than 50 cars and over 60 circuits
- The game displays up to 21 cars racing on track simultaneously
- Multiplayer mode with the ability to race with 12 players simultaneously

== Reception ==
Reception

Aggregate score
Aggregator	Score
Metacritic	81/100

Review scores
Publication	Score
1Up.com	B−
Game Informer	8.5/10
GameSpot	8.2/10
GameSpy	4.5/5
GameTrailers	8.7/10
GameZone	8.6/10
Hardcore Gamer	3/5
IGN	8.5/10
Official U.S. PlayStation Magazine	3.5/5
X-Play	4/5

The game received "favourable" reviews according to the review aggregation website Metacritic.

It was given IGN's awards for Best PSP Racing Game and Best PSP Simulation of 2006.
