= Grid Autosport =

2014 video game

- Cover art featuring Ravenwest Motorsport's Pagani Zonda Revolución and Dallara DW12
- Developers: Codemasters; Feral Interactive (macOS, Linux, iOS, Android & Nintendo Switch)
- Publishers: Codemasters; Feral Interactive (macOS, Linux, iOS & Android)
- Series: Grid
- Engine: EGO Engine 3.0
- Platforms: Microsoft Windows; PlayStation 3 Xbox 360; Linux macOS iOS; Nintendo Switch; Android
- Release: Microsoft Windows, PlayStation 3, Xbox 360: NA: 24 June 2014; AU: 26 June 2014; EU: 27 June 2014; Linux, macOS: WW: 10 December 2015; iOS: WW: 27 November 2017; Nintendo Switch: WW: 19 September 2019; Android: WW: 26 November 2019
- Genre: Racing
- Modes: Single-player, multiplayer

Grid Autosport is a 2014 racing video game developed and published by Codemasters. It was released Microsoft Windows, PlayStation 3 and Xbox 360, with ports for Linux, iOS, macOS, Nintendo Switch and Android arriving later. It is the third game in the Grid series. It aims to move the series back towards "more authentic racing games" following the release of Grid 2, which Codemasters felt was not as well-received by the company's core fanbase as it was hoped for. The developers consequently introduced major modifications to the handling model and built a lean, race-first oriented design for this title.

Many critics who praised the game cited how Codemasters seemed to have "gone back to its roots", with aspects from its early games in the series.

Feral Interactive, who brought the game to macOS and Linux, also brought the game to iOS on 27 November 2017. The Nintendo Switch version, also from Feral Interactive, was released on 19 September 2019, and their Android version of the game was released on 26 November 2019. The game's online servers were shut down on March 16, 2026.

A sequel, Grid, was released on in October 2019 for Microsoft Windows, PlayStation 4, Xbox One, and Stadia.

== Gameplay ==
In Grid Autosport, the player acts as a racing driver with opportunities to start and build their own racing career via the single-player Career mode, enter competitions with fellow players on the web via the multiplayer Online mode, customise their racing experience (vehicle, circuit, race type, difficulty, etc.) to their own tastes via the single-player Custom Cup mode, and play against each other via the multiplayer Splitscreen mode. It was also considered the first video game of the GRID series not to feature Vehicle Customization this time in single player career, as only featured in online mode.

The Career mode is divided into seasons during which the player has to choose between offers from the game's racing teams each time. Most teams, including the best-in-the-business Ravenwest, are making a return from Race Driver: Grid – each have different season objectives and sponsor objectives, the achievement of which earns extra experience points (XP) for the players besides those received for their results. Online racing is conducted via RaceNet, Codemasters' community hub on which players can form racing clubs, earn XP and cash as they race and fulfill sponsor objectives, then use their earnings to purchase and upgrade vehicles. Soon after the game's release, they were also presented with sets of specific challenges, called RaceNet Challenges, announced by Codemasters.

Grid Autosport emphasises the concept of racing disciplines, making them into the new event categories. There are five main categories: Touring, Endurance, Open Wheel, Tuner, and Street. During Career mode, the player picks a particular event in one of these categories, with each event (a string of races) making up a season. Each discipline features markedly different cars and race types. The latter include standard Races, Endurance races with tire wear enabled, Time attack events, Drift events, and - as downloadable content (DLC) - Time Trials, Drag and point-to-point Sprint races. These are all accessible in Custom Cup mode as well, in which the player can also choose to participate in certain special event types, such as Checkpoint, Eliminator and Demolition derby.

Focusing on providing a more realistic driving experience, the studio revamped its damage model, adding new elements, such as a wear and tear system, which means car parts lose performance through general use, and a suspension damage system. It also introduced a new team radio philosophy in which the player itself can request information on car damage, gaps, rival position and teammate position. The player can also ask its engineer to instruct their teammates to attack, defend or hold their position. By popular demand, Codemasters retained its unique Flashback feature from previous Grid instalments with which the players can rewind their races a few seconds and resume it earlier, if needed. Cockpit view also made a return, after being absent, very much to the dismay of the core fanbase, in Grid 2. Aside from such elements, the developers generally decided to strip the game down and do away with everything that stood in the way of raw racing. These features included the Grid 2 narrator-driven career mode and superfluous menus.

=== Cars ===
The cars in the disciplines of Grid Autosport are further divided into tiers and classes of various strength. Some of the highlights of the vehicles on offer are the contemporary BTCC (Class C), Stock Car Brasil (Class A) and V8 Supercars (Super Tourers) of the Touring discipline (e. g. Chevrolet Cruze and Holden Commodore VF), as well as the present-day and classic GT cars of the Endurance discipline (like the Mercedes-Benz SLS AMG GT3 (Category B) and the Ford GT40 Mk I), the Dallara DW12 chassis of the IndyCar Series (Formula A) from the Open Wheel discipline, American muscle cars (e. g. the Ford Mustang Boss 302), among others, representing the Tuner discipline and the likes of the Bugatti Veyron 16.4 Super Sport and the Koenigsegg Agera R (Hypercars) representing the Street discipline. In total, including DLCs, the game features 103 cars. This is the second video game under Grid series not to feature Toyota cars and first in series not to feature Chevrolet Corvette.

=== Tracks ===
In the case of the tracks, the main emphasis is on real-world permanent circuits which make up the majority of the courses in the game. These range from classics, such as Spa-Francorchamps, Brands Hatch, Mount Panorama and Indianapolis, to more modern facilities, like the Circuit of the Americas, Sepang, the Red Bull Ring and the Yas Marina Circuit in Abu Dhabi. City locations with fictionally lined, but mostly real-world streets of San Francisco, Paris, Dubai etc., and - as DLCs - fictional point-to-point tracks in authentic settings complete the picture. In all, players are able to race on 15 real-world permanent circuits, 2 fictional permanent circuits, 7 street circuits, and 4 point-to-point tracks, including additional content, for a total of 28 locations with over 130 configurations.

== Development ==
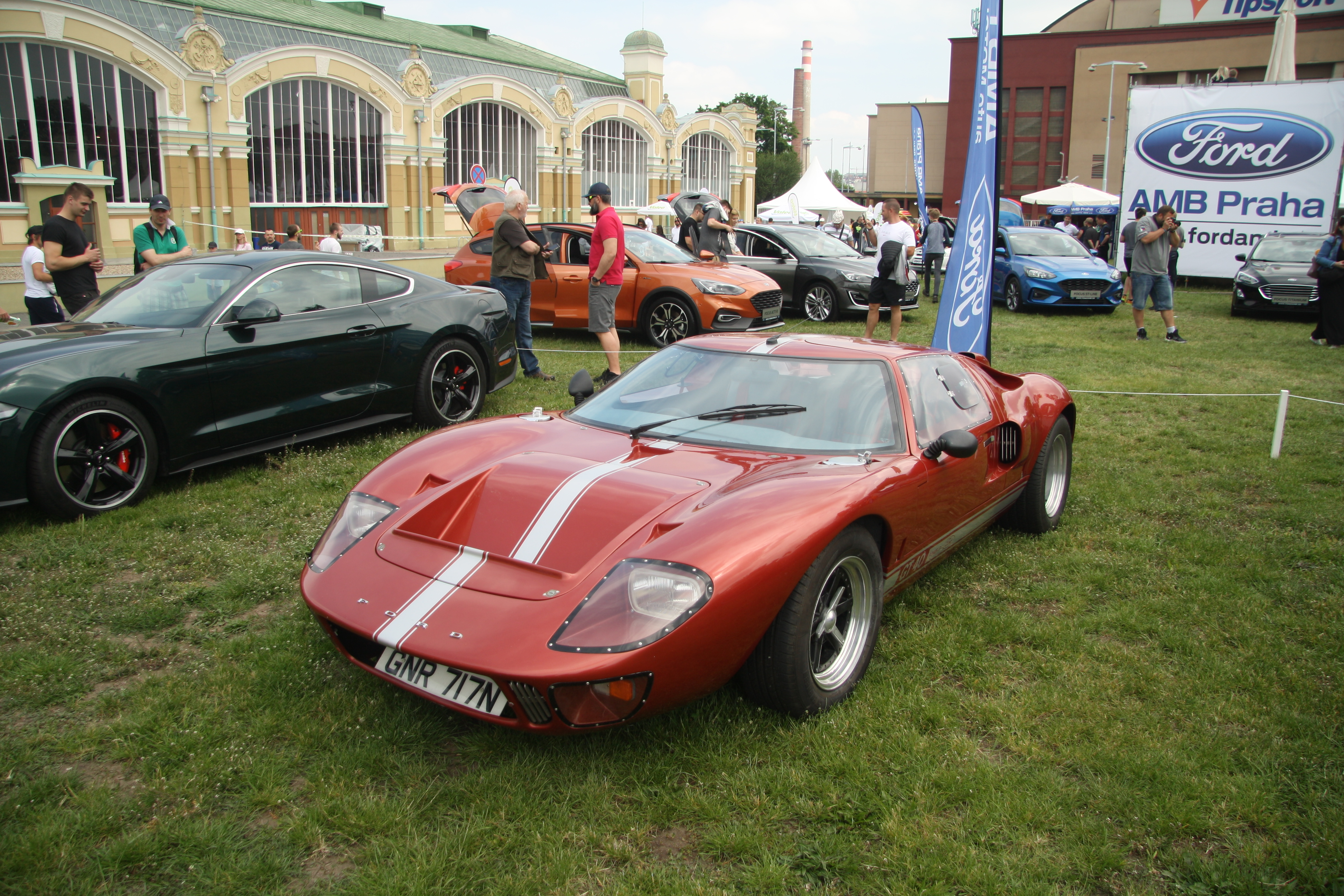
Grid Autosport features several licensed cars from various racing disciplines, such as the Ford GT40 Mk I.

Grid Autosport was announced on in April 2014 via the official Codemasters Blog, less than a year after the release of its predecessor, Grid 2. Producer Toby Evan-Jones revealed in an interview that the development of the new title began as soon as the development of Grid 2 came close to a finish, which occurred in the spring of 2013. Evan-Jones had this to say on the short development cycle between the two games and the general intentions with Grid Autosport:

Historically we've kind of alternated between [the Dirt and the Grid series, but] when we put [Grid 2] out we stood back and took stock and there was a lot of stuff the dev team wanted to have in there in terms of optimisation, new features and generally improving things. At the same time there was a fair amount of feedback from the fans with regards to what they wanted, so additional touring car content, the return of cockpit cam and more of a nudge back to simulation rather than arcade. We though [sic] (…) we'd keep it rolling.

— Codemasters Producer Toby Evan-Jones

The game eliminated the so-called TrueFeel handling of Grid 2, but it did not simply return to the handling of Race Driver: Grid. Codemasters used a new, improved version of its previous model, better simulating how grip falls away, when the player approaches the slip angle of the tyres. Decision to use the new model, which was tested by Autosport magazine experts and racing drivers, was made on 23 January 2014, which was followed by applying it to each car's grip falloff graph and re-tuning the vehicles' individual handling characteristics. According to the company, the shift caused the most difficulties in modeling the behaviour of open wheelers and American muscle cars. It also necessitated re-doing the AI benchmarking work, which was well-underway by then using the old model. The game was built using Codemasters' in-house EGO 3.0 engine.

Graphically, Grid Autosport benefitted heavily from optimisation and fine-tuning of said long-standing engine to achieve better performance on low-end machines, while on the other end, support for DirectX 11 features enabled the programmers to improve renderings, especially grass and light, from Grid 2. Feral Interactive ported the game to macOS and Linux. The online multiplayer system was also among the areas that Codemasters decided to overhaul compared to Grid 2, based on fan feedback. The framework of earning XP and cash to purchase own vehicles and garage slots was a result of community criticism towards the previous framework in which the player had a ladder, laid out in advance by the game, to unlock cars. Feedback deemed the old approach too easy to complete. As for the extremely tight development schedule, involving less than twelve months, lead designer James Nicholls said:

Many developers will tell you that the toughest bit of making any game is that initial phase – getting the technology and the tools to the point where a whole team are really moving through the gears and producing at full speed. (…) GRID Autosport already had the team and the technology ready to go.

— Codemasters Lead Designer James Nicholls

For car audio, the team used up to 16 mics mounted in- and outside real cars. Changes such as camera position and damage affect the sound.

=== Technology ===
Codemasters collaborated with Intel on certain technology within the game including high-end visual optimisations, DirectX 11 support, touch-screen input, tablet gaming support and "WiDi" (Intel's wireless second-screen technology). Details were disclosed during a 2014 interview with Toby Evan-Jones (Producer) and Richard Kettlewell (Senior Graphics Programmer).

== Release ==
Grid Autosport comes in two versions – a standard edition and a special edition, the latter of which is called the Black Edition; it includes an extra vehicle (a Mercedes Benz SLS AMG Coupé Black Series), extra sponsors and extra liveries for both offline and online modes. Pre-orders for Grid Autosport by retailers began as soon as the initial game announcement was made. Steam pre-orders went online a week later than planned in May 2014, but all of those who pre-ordered the title via Steam received the Black Edition at no extra cost compared to the standard edition. Those who owned Grid 2 received a 10% discount and a free copy of Dirt Showdown as well. Grid Autosport was officially released on 24 June 2014 in North America and 27 June in Europe across all three current-gen platforms, PC, PlayStation 3 and Xbox 360. The macOS and Linux port was released on 10 December 2015 by Feral Interactive. Lead designer James Nicholls confirmed that the game would not make it onto next-gen platforms given the tight timeframes the team worked with during the development process. However, the Xbox 360 version became backwards compatible with the Xbox One in June 2018, four years after their game's release.

=== Updates and downloadable content ===
The game received downloadable content packs until November 2014, usually once in every two weeks. The majority of these can be broken down into two main categories: mini expansions and car packs. Codemasters put out three mini expansions for this Grid title. Perhaps the most eagerly anticipated one of these was the Touring Legends Pack as it featured two new real-world circuits – Donington Park and Silverstone, five classic BTCC touring cars from the mid-1990s and new single player championships (outside Career mode). Another mini expansion, called Sprint Pack, introduced the Sprint race type to the game, besides featuring four fictional point-to-point tracks and more extra championships. The third one, the Drag Pack, introduced the Drag race type, three drag cars and nine single player championships.

Car packs, of which there were three as well, included the Best of British Pack, which contained three British-originated vehicles, e. g. the McLaren F1 GTR, the Coupé Style Pack, that offered four new coupés, such as the Hyundai Genesis Coupé, and a Road & Track Pack, which added two road-going cars and two racing cars to the game. There has been a number of additional DLC available to the game. For example, a Season Pass was created with which the player practically subscribed to the above six packs at a discount rate. A High Res Texture Pack boosted game textures up to 4K resolution and was made available to download with the base game at the launch for free. A Premium Garage Pack was also released, adding five additional garage spots for online play, and the Black Edition content was later sold as a standalone DLC pack as well. Additionally, a free Demoman Derby DLC was released exclusively on PC, which includes two skins from Team Fortress 2, and consisting a different environment and billboards which are also based on Team Fortress 2.

The studio released Boost Pack, a small piece of code to boost career and online XP progression, for the same price as the car packs. Controversy followed as Codemasters Community Manager Ben Walke commented the reason behind the already criticised move was simply that "it sells". Continued patch support of the game saw the developer team repeatedly addressing various emerging save game corruption issues, online playlist issues, etc. They enabled the Time Trial race type (which was missing from the base game due to prolonged technical difficulties), added Oculus Rift support and a virtual rear-view mirror (although, in the case of the latter, only for PC). The Nintendo Switch version supports the use of Nintendo Labo Vehicle Kit, where the wheel Toy-Con serves as an alternative control option.

== Reception ==
Reception

Aggregate score
Aggregator	Score
Metacritic	PC: 78/100; PS3: 75/100; X360: 75/100 iOS: 90/100; NS: 79/100

Review scores
Publication	Score
Edge	9/10
Eurogamer	7/10
Game Informer	7.8/10
GamesRadar+	4.5/5
GameTrailers	7.9/10
IGN	8.3/10
PC Gamer (UK)	86/100
PC PowerPlay	8/10
TouchArcade	iOS: 5/5
PC Advisor	4.5/5

Award
Publication	Award
GamesRadar	Best Racing Game (2014)

The game received generally positive reviews. Metacritic gave it an aggregate score of 78/100 for PC and 75/100 for PlayStation 3 and Xbox 360. Critics especially praised its more authentic handling model as well as its stripped-down approach to racing and excellent damage system.

The Career mode gained widespread approval for being "simply about winning races and mastering various driving styles" with the ability to switch between disciplines letting the player "go as focused or as broad as [he or she] likes". GamesRadar+ felt that having a nominated opponent provided "a decent sense of rivalry (…) which gives races more meaning (…) and the experience is richer for having clear rivals to beat". Eurogamer called Online mode "a comprehensive suite", one which "a series of [car] mods and upgrades lends persistence" to. Game Informer said that it "offers slightly more freedom [than the Career mode]" and its feature set is varied. The online playing experience was considered "smooth, with no drop outs or lag experienced".

In terms of handling, the reviewers emphasised that the game "still straddles the line between simulation and arcade", but it "definitely leans a little further on the side of realism [than most Codemasters games]" and "it's a significant improvement on Grid 2's awkward dynamics". Edge noted that it "offers considerable depth" and its "lively feedback makes for an intense, and satisfying, drive". Despite that, it is "still approachable" and Luke Reilly from IGN found the model to be "fairly forgiving".

The game's artificial intelligence (AI) behaviour was said to be a success, at least in part. The computer-controlled opponents' "defensive driving lines, late-braking overshoots into hairpins, and fiendishly clever cut-backs" can make "a normally disappointing 8th place finish (…) just as rewarding as a win". As for their speed, it is heavily dependent on difficulty levels, of which the lowest allows the player to "thread through 16 positions over the course of three laps with little resistance", while on the hardest "you can spend a whole race exchanging 13th and 14th positions with another car".

PC Advisor praised the "immense" variety of cars present in the game as well as the inclusion of "plenty of classics". Kotaku added that the "more experienced players will appreciate the subtle differences between their fleet". The title's damage model was critically acclaimed as the above review highlighted that "each car [is] responding accurately to collisions" with the crashes having "a massive effect on performance". Edge deemed the system a "triumph". The introduction of tyre wear (in Endurance events) was also welcomed – GamesRadar+ wrote that "it becomes so integral to the driving process, you'll find yourself looking for the [tyre life] percentage indicators in other modes every time you hear the wheels slip". Grid Autosport has a "generous selection of tracks", in which "real-world circuits are the focus" at the expense of "unforgiving (…) and tight" street circuits.

The general graphical qualities of the game were lauded as "magnificent" and "lovely" with "incidental details [on the race track that] make for an engaging race-day atmosphere" being particularly impressing. As for the game interface, Edge hailed its "pared-down design (…) with simple, clean (and fast loading) menus". Similarly to graphics, the most positive aspects of sounds were the details; the "nice ambient effects" and the "small touches such as being able to hear the commentators over the track" that make the experience "more immersive". GamesRadar+ found the new system of being able to request information on the pit channel useful, claiming "you can rely on aural feedback (…) for maximum authenticity".

By far the most heavily criticised feature of the game was, ironically, the returning cockpit view. It is, while "incredibly welcome from a gameplay standpoint, (…) visually they're a slapped-on eyesore, blurred-out in an attempt to hide the lack of detail". IGN remarked that they "lack any working dials or mirrors".

Several reviews mention that they found the AI to be, depending on discipline, too aggressive, so much so that "having an AI take you out at least once a race is (…) to be expected". Edge elaborated that "they don't always concede in the same way a human driver might, sticking to their chosen route even though you legitimately out-braked them into a corner". Leaving out pit stops also left some of the critics puzzled. IGN said "it's a bizarre omission (…) that quietly undermines a lot of what Autosport does right", pointing out that suffering a puncture leaves the player with no option to repair the damage.

Eurogamer warned that the content-wise excellent Career mode can feel "long and drawn-out" and that "progress in GRID Autosport is slow". GameTrailers added that "the whole experience feels rather clinical". The reception of the request-based team radio was also mixed with GamesRadar+ arguing that "the pit audio repeats itself far too quickly and doesn't always make perfect sense". Finally, a number of reviewers noted that a lot of cars and tracks are re-used material from earlier Codemasters titles, which feels "stale".

As of 24 July 2018, the iOS version of the game sold more than 100,000 copies.
