= TOCA World Touring Cars =

2000 video game

- European PlayStation cover art
- Developers: Codemasters; Spellbound (GBA)
- Publisher: Codemasters: JP: Spike
- Series: TOCA
- Platforms: PlayStation, Game Boy Advance
- Release: PlayStation: EU: 25 August 2000; NA: 3 October 2000; JP: 9 November 2000; Game Boy Advance: EU: 7 March 2003
- Genre: Racing
- Modes: Single-player, multiplayer

TOCA World Touring Cars is a 2000 racing video game developed and published by Codemasters for PlayStation and Game Boy Advance. It is the third game in the TOCA series.

TOCA World Touring Cars features various Touring Car championships from around the world, but despite carrying the TOCA name, a fully licensed British Touring Car Championship (TOCA) series was not included. This upset a lot of fans of the series, but success continued. The gameplay overall became more "Arcade" and the replacement of qualifying laps with random grid positions together with the omission of penalties for bad driving made the game much more playable for the casual gamer. Unlike the first two titles in the TOCA series, World Touring Cars was not released in a Windows version.

For the North American market, the game was released as Jarrett & Labonte Stock Car Racing, with the cover art featuring NASCAR drivers Jason Jarrett and Justin Labonte.

== Reception ==
Reception

Aggregate score
Aggregator	Score
Metacritic	80/100

Review scores
Publication	Score
CNET Gamecenter	7/10
Edge	8/10
Electronic Gaming Monthly	8.67/10
Famitsu	27/40
Game Informer	7.75/10
GamePro	3.5/5 (Note: GamePro gave the game two 4/5 scores for graphics and sound, and two 3.5/5 scores for control and overall fun factor.)
GameSpot	8.9/10
IGN	8.3/10
PlayStation Official Magazine – UK	10/10
Official U.S. PlayStation Magazine	4/5

Award
Publication	Award
OPM (UK)	Star Player

The game received "favourable" reviews according to the review aggregation website Metacritic. In Japan, where the PlayStation version was ported and published by Spike under the name WTC: World Touring Car Championship (WTC ワールド・ツーリングカー・チャンピオンシップ, WTC Wārudo Tsūringukā Chanpionshippu) on 9 November 2000, Famitsu gave it a score of 27 out of 40.

The PS version was a bestseller in the UK, replacing WWF SmackDown!. In the media, once again the franchise was compared to the Gran Turismo series and TOCA was warmly received by much of the specialist press, most notably scoring 10 out of 10 in Official UK PlayStation Magazine. The detailed and smooth graphics were of particular praise, and it had "an ideal mix of driving, crashing and career progression".

The same console version was a runner-up for GameSpot's annual "Best Driving Game" award among console games, losing to Test Drive Le Mans.
