= TOCA (series) =

Racing video game series by Codemasters

- Genre(s): Racing
- Developer(s): Codemasters
- Publisher(s): Codemasters
- Platform(s): PlayStation, Microsoft Windows, Game Boy Color, PlayStation 2, Game Boy Advance, Nintendo DS, Xbox, Mobile, PlayStation Portable, OS X
- First release: TOCA Touring Car Championship; November 1997
- Latest release: Race Driver: Create & Race; 28 September 2007

TOCA (also known as Race Driver) is a racing video game series developed and published by Codemasters. The series originally focused specifically on touring car racing, but after World Touring Cars, the series expanded to cover a wide variety of motorsport. The TOCA series was eventually succeeded by the Grid series of games, with Race Driver: Grid released in 2008.

== Games ==
Aggregate review scores
Game	Metacritic
TOCA Touring Car Championship	(PC) 75% (Note: GameRankings score) (PS1) 83%
TOCA 2 Touring Cars	(PC) 78% (PS1) 79%
TOCA World Touring Cars	(PS1) 80/100
TOCA Race Driver	(PC) 74/100 (PS2) 81/100 (Xbox) 80/100
TOCA Race Driver 2	(PC) 81/100 (PS2) 83/100 (PSP) 78% (Xbox) 83%
TOCA Race Driver 3	(PC) 84/100 (PS2) 82/100 (PSP) 74% (Xbox) 84/100
Race Driver 2006	81/100
Race Driver: Create & Race	76/100

=== TOCA Touring Car Championship (1997) ===
The first game of the series was released for Windows and PlayStation platforms in late 1997 in Europe, and in summer 1998 in the United States (as TOCA Championship Racing). Featuring all the licensed cars (not including privateers) and tracks from the 1997 British Touring Car Championship, the game was acclaimed by the European games press, especially on console where it was widely considered the best in its genre until the release of Gran Turismo several months later.

=== TOCA 2 Touring Cars (1998) ===
The success of the first TOCA game saw a sequel arrive a year later in 1998. Whilst mainly an annual franchise update of cars and tracks, the game did add more detailed graphics, physics, multiplayer modes and other minor features. Fictional (but realistic) tracks were added, and support races such as Ford Fiestas, Formula Ford and others also arrived. The level of car damage possible during a race was also enhanced, which was a significant selling point compared with the likes of Gran Turismo. It was called Touring Car Challenge in the USA.

=== TOCA World Touring Cars (2000) ===
As the title suggests, the series made a significant advance in featuring various Touring Car championships from around the world, TOCA World Touring Cars, which was released in 2000, but despite carrying the TOCA name, a fully licensed British Touring Car Championship (TOCA) series was not included. The gameplay overall became more "arcadey" and the replacement of qualifying laps with random grid positions together with the omission of penalties for bad driving made the game much more playable for the casual gamer. Unlike the first two titles in the TOCA series, World Touring Cars was not released in a Windows version.

=== TOCA Race Driver (2002) ===
The series moved onto the 6th generation of gaming in August 2002, with the release of TOCA Race Driver (called DTM Race Driver in Germany, Pro Race Driver in North America and V8 Supercars: Race Driver in Australia). The game took the series in a new direction, and introduced a plot centering around fictional race driver Ryan McKane, trying to make a name for himself in a multitude of car championships.

=== TOCA Race Driver 2 (2004) ===
Race Driver 2 was released on Xbox and PC in April 2004, with a PlayStation 2 version following six months later. Two PSP conversions were released in 2005 and 2006, the first being TOCA Race Driver 2 in Europe and Japan and the second being Race Driver 2006 in the US. The game continued to use a scripted career mode as introduced in the previous Race Driver game but dropped the Ryan McKane character.

=== TOCA Race Driver 3 (2006) ===
The third game in the TOCA Race Driver series was released in February 2006, and continued to expand on the types of motorsport available. Open wheel, GT, oval racing, rallying, and offroad racing were all featured, and can be raced in either a detailed Pro Career mode or an open-ended World Tour. Up to 12 players are supported via Xbox Live and the PlayStation 2 version supports up to 8 online. This series is the only racing simulator that allows PlayStation players to race online before Gran Turismo 5 Prologue. It received good reviews, frequently being compared favourably to Gran Turismo 4 and Forza Motorsport, in the aspects of cars on track, damage and AI.

=== Race Driver: Create & Race (2007) ===
Race Driver: Create & Race was developed by Firebrand Games exclusively for Nintendo DS. Create and Race is the second racing game developed by Firebrand Games to run on the Octane game engine (after Cartoon Network Racing). The engine was upgraded to support a track editor and Firebrand Games would go on to reuse it for DS versions of Race Driver: Grid and Dirt 2.
