= Grid (2019 video game) =

2019 video game

- Cover art featuring a Chevrolet Corvette C7.R and a Porsche 911
- Developer: Codemasters
- Publisher: Codemasters
- Composer: Jeff Broadbent
- Series: Grid
- Engine: Ego
- Platforms: Microsoft Windows; PlayStation 4 Xbox One; Stadia
- Release: Windows, PS4, Xbox One; 11 October 2019; Stadia; 19 November 2019; Amazon Luna; 20 October 2020
- Genre: Racing
- Modes: Single-player, multiplayer

Grid is a 2019 racing video game developed and published by Codemasters for Microsoft Windows, PlayStation 4, and Xbox One in October 2019, and for Stadia and Amazon Luna in November 2019 and October 2020 as a launch title for each system, respectively. It is the fourth title in the Grid series. A sequel, Grid Legends, was released on 25 February 2022.

Grid was quietly delisted from digital storefronts in November 2023. The online services for Grid were shut down on 19 December 2025, though the game continues to be playable offline.

== Gameplay ==
Grid emphasises the concept of racing disciplines, making them into the new event categories. There are six main categories: Touring, Stock, Tuner, GT, FA Racing and invitational. During Career mode, the player picks a particular event in one of these categories, with each event (a string of races) making up a championship. Each discipline features markedly different cars and race types. The latter include standard Races, Time Attack events, Time Trials, and point-to-point Sprint races. These features included the in-game commentary from Alex from the United States as a play-by-play, along with former 2-time World Time Attack Champion and a regular top level touring car driver from Australia, named Kristen as an analyst during the race.

=== Grid World Series ===
The Grid World Series is a highly competitive racing event that races on various tracks on various continents around the globe. It features race types including Race and Time Attack. Winning races against drivers in established teams in the entire disciplines gains more money for the series, and the achievement of which earns extra experience points (XP) for the players besides those received for their results. Once completed, the player is welcomed to the Grid World Series, and must either complete the main objective when the players entered an event, or earn a gold, silver or bronze medal to earn money, and unlock player's teammates, banner and panel images, as well as custom liveries and accolades.

=== Nemesis System ===
One of the key mechanics is the Nemesis System where AI drivers will become aggressive towards the player if they hit them too hard or too often, as part of this there are 400 unique AI drivers, each with their own racing style. Fernando Alonso appears in this game as a "Racing Consultant", with the player facing him in the single-player campaign's final event, as well as a spotter. Jamie Chadwick is also featured as Alonso's teammate.

=== Cars ===
The cars in the disciplines of the game are further divided into tiers and classes of various strength. Some of the highlights of the vehicles on offer are the contemporary TCR (TC-2), Supercars (Super Tourers) and Group 5 cars (TC-1 Specials) of the Touring discipline, as well as the American modified muscle cars, fictional Dumont Type 37 and a customized Oval Stock Jupiter San Marino representing the Stock discipline, the GT4, GTE and DPi cars of the GT discipline, JDM modified tuning and World Time Attack cars representing the Tuner discipline, and the classic cars from the 1960s until 2000s representing the Invitational discipline. This is the first in the series not to feature Mercedes-Benz & McLaren cars, except the McLaren M8D.

=== Tracks ===
In the case of the tracks, the main emphasis is on real-world permanent circuits which make up the majority of the courses in the game. These range from classics, such as Brands Hatch, Silverstone, Indianapolis, to more modern facilities, like the Sydney Motorsport Park, Sepang and Zhejiang International Circuit. City locations with fictionally lined, but mostly real-world streets of San Francisco, Shanghai, Barcelona, Havana, and the fictional point-to-point tracks in authentic settings complete the picture (Okutama only), and — as DLCs — including the Red Bull Ring, Paris and Suzuka International Racing Course.

== Development ==
Grid was originally announced on 21 May 2019. It was initially scheduled for release on 13 September 2019, but it was decided by the creators to delay the game's original release date to give it “added exposure” for when it released. The game was later released on 11 October 2019. Versions for cloud-based streaming services Google Stadia and Amazon Luna were released on 19 November 2019 and 20 October 2020, respectively.

The sound design team recorded over 69 cars for the game, capturing intake, exhaust, transmission, and cabin sounds to properly characterize each car.

== Reception ==
Reception

Aggregate score
Aggregator	Score
Metacritic	(PC) 74/100 (PS4) 73/100 (XONE) 79/100

Review scores
Publication	Score
Game Informer	7/10
IGN	8/10
Jeuxvideo.com	15/20
PlayStation Official Magazine – UK	7/10
PC Gamer (US)	68/100

Grid received "mixed or average" and "generally favorable" reviews, according to review aggregator platform Metacritic.

=== Awards ===
Year	Award	Category	Result	Ref.
2019	Game Critics Awards	Best Racing Game	Nominated	
2019	Gamescom	Best Racing Game	Won	
2019	Titanium Awards	Best Sports/Racing Game	Nominated	
