= Project CARS 2 =

Motorsport racing simulator video game

- Promotional artwork featuring the Ferrari 488 GT3, the 2016 Honda Civic Coupe GRC and the McLaren 720S
- Developer: Slightly Mad Studios
- Publisher: Bandai Namco Entertainment
- Director: Stephen Viljoen
- Producer: Andy Cherry
- Designer: Andy Tudor
- Programmers: Steven A. Dunn; Anders Johansson; Iain Wallington
- Artist: Darren White
- Composer: Stephen Baysted
- Series: Project CARS
- Platforms: PlayStation 4; Windows; Xbox One
- Release: 22 September 2017
- Genre: Racing simulation
- Modes: Single-player, multiplayer

Project CARS 2 is a motorsport racing simulator video game developed by Slightly Mad Studios and published and distributed by the Bandai Namco Entertainment group. It was released worldwide on 22 September 2017 for PlayStation 4, Windows, and Xbox One.

== Gameplay ==
Project CARS 2 offers 140 track layouts at 60 different locations and 189 cars to choose from. It advertises that "each track is a living, organic venue" and "changes lap by lap" as the race progresses. This is achieved by a system called LiveTrack 3.0, including e.g. track temperature or dynamic weather.

The game now features off-road driving, including rallycross tracks and cars. There are new manufacturers in the game, including Porsche, Ferrari, Lamborghini, Jaguar, Honda, Acura and Nissan. In addition, Project CARS 2 supports virtual reality (VR), up to 12K resolution, and triple screen support.

== Development ==
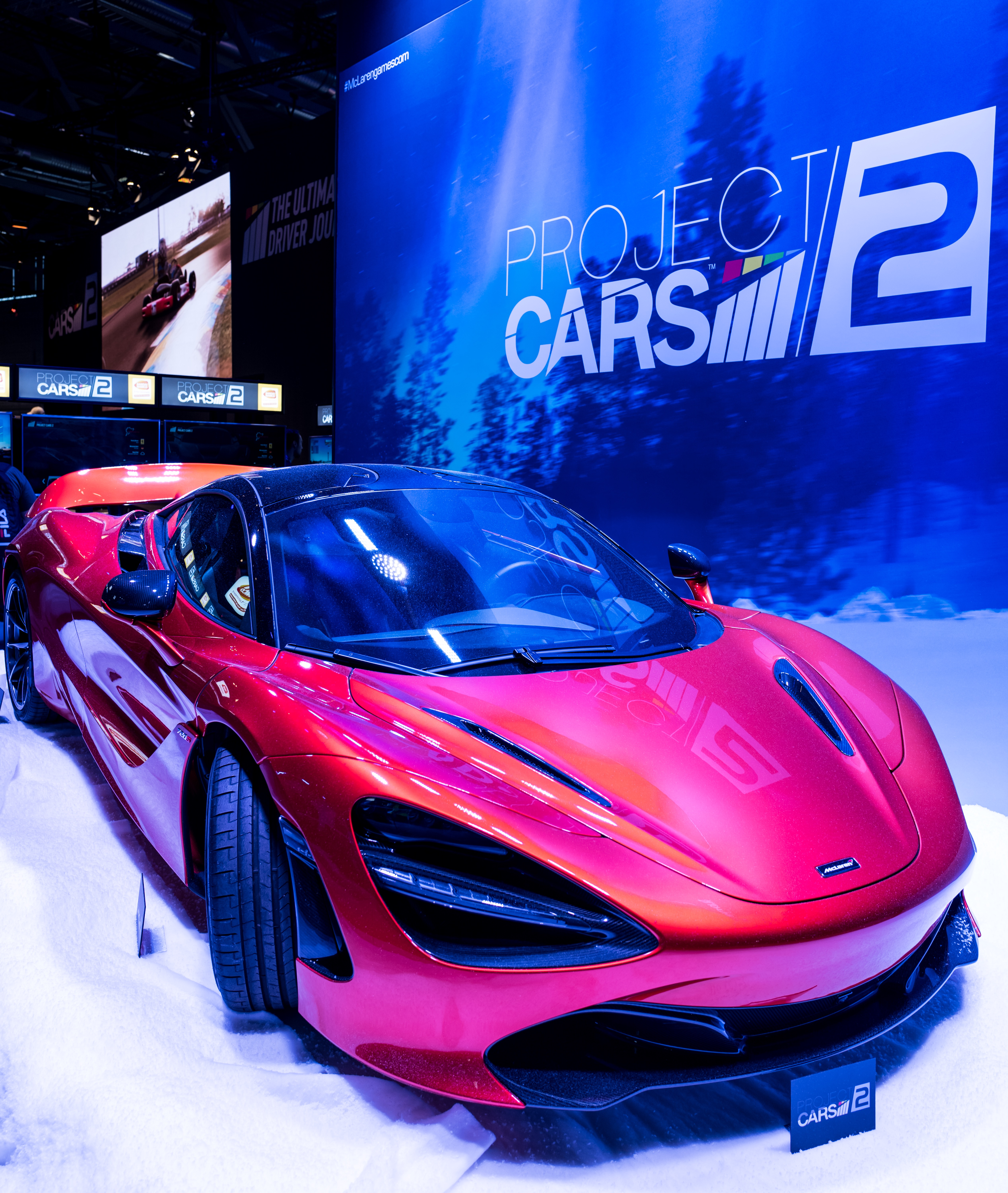
Promotion at Gamescom 2017

Following the success of Project CARS, funding began to open for Project CARS 2 on 23 June 2015. World of Mass Development and Slightly Mad Studios opened donations through the "Project CARS 2 official forum". Forum members and visitors choosing to donate had the option to using membership through the forums. In exchange, donors could gain access to development builds and voicing thoughts, opinions, and suggestions critical to the progress of the game.

On 8 February 2017, Project CARS 2 was officially announced as a game coming late 2017. Slightly Mad Studios soon revealed that the game was going to consist of 182 cars from 38 manufacturers and a variety of car and race car classes, new additions including the Honda Civic, Jaguar XJ220, Toyota GT-86 and Nissan R89C. The game also has a larger track roster, with 46 tracks (containing 121 layouts), the majority being laser scanned circuits, and new additions including Fuji Speedway, Knockhill, Long Beach and the Dirtfish rallycross track. A new time and weather system have also been included in-game which can allow multiple different changing weather conditions and changes within a given season (winter, spring, summer, autumn). The game uses the proprietary Madness Engine which enables highly detailed vehicle simulation using a custom physics engine called LiveTrack 3.0, bringing realistic track conditions throughout a race weekend. Online mode has also been developed with a focus on esports, bringing an online ranking system, online championships, and better functionality in matchmaking. They also developed a partnership with IndyCar, which includes all the lineup of the 2016 season, the official logo and the Indy 500.

Through the months leading up to a release, Slightly Mad Studios have worked closely with auto manufacturers, auto industry companies, and race car drivers to help them in making an accurate simulation. As a result, cars have specific performance characteristics and represents its real-life counterpart accurately. The tire physics have also been built from the ground up to use the proprietary Seta Tire Model (STM), with full dynamic tire movements and actions simulated at up to 200hz.

On 21 September 2022, the game was delisted from digital storefronts due to expiring car and track licenses - the game remains playable to those who purchased it prior to the delisting.

=== Additional content ===
Pack	Date	Tracks	Cars
Japanese Pack	Nov 2017	0	4
Fun Pack	Dec 2017	2	8
Porsche Legends	Mar 2018	1	9
Spirit of Le Mans	Jun 2018	1	9
Ferrari Essentials	Sep 2018	2	8

== Reception ==
Reception

Aggregate score
Aggregator	Score
Metacritic	PC: 84/100; PS4: 82/100; XONE: 84/100

Review scores
Publication	Score
Edge	8/10
Electronic Gaming Monthly	6/10
Eurogamer	PS4: 8/10
Game Informer	7.75/10
GameSpot	7/10
IGN	9.2/10
PC Gamer (US)	89/100
Hobby Consolas	PS4: 9/10

Project CARS 2 received "generally favorable" reviews from critics, according to review aggregator Metacritic.

"Project Cars 2 may do a great many things exceptionally well, but it's hard to look past the mountain of gaffes that quickly pile up on and off the track. Racing, after all, is about results, not potential." was Josh Harmon's conclusion on Electronic Gaming Monthly with a score of 6/10.

Matthew Kato from Game Informer gave the game a score of 7.75/10 saying that "With all its customization options, racing demands, and copious track configurations (140-plus at over 60 locations), Project Cars 2 has a lot to dive into. However, it's more than just a scattershot of content – it's a title that rewards players for exploring all of its nooks and crannies. It could still use a good coat of polish, but it has a charm and daring that is often missing in the sub-genre." Hobby Consolas also praised the breadth of content.

Richard Wakeling of GameSpot awarded it 7/10 stating that "When it all works as intended, Project Cars 2 is a brilliant simulation racer provided you're playing with a wheel. It's ambitious in scope and depth, and the sheer breadth of available motorsports almost guarantees there's something for everyone to sink their teeth into. It's a shame, then, that there's always this nagging feeling in the back of your mind that a bug or moment of AI madness will disrupt the whole thing and more often than not, it will. These issues may be ironed out in the coming weeks and months, but with potentially stiff competition on the very-near horizon, Slightly Mad Studios might not have enough time to capture the hearts and minds of video game racing fans before they move on to pastures new." Eurogamer also mentioned the bugs.

9.2/10 was Luke Reilly's score on IGN and said "With its refined new handling and piles of race options, Project CARS 2 is about as good as real racing gets right now." Edge agreed, saying that "no racer offers such a breadth of choice, or seems so willing to let the player set the rules of the road." The game was nominated for "Best Racing Game" and "Best VR Experience" in IGN's Best of 2017 Awards.

PC Gamer's Phil Iwaniuk scored the game an 89/100 with the consensus "Serious racing for serious racers. Extraordinarily convincing at each of the disciplines on offer." Evo opined it had "excellent graphics and thundering, all-encompassing sounds".

Driving.co.uk said it was "Very tricky to master, which will put off the arcade racer crowd, but impressive attention to detail, realistic handling, speedy, atmospheric menus and a mouth-watering array of cars and tracks continue to make Project Cars one of the best racing games available."

Project CARS 2 was the 17th best Xbox game of the year on Metacritic.

=== Sales ===
Project CARS 2 reached number 2 in the UK sales charts, behind Destiny 2. The game reached number 3 in both Australia and New Zealand. In Japan, it was the 6th best-selling PlayStation 4 game, and 11th overall. The game sold 265,000 copies on PC in the first 9 months following release.

=== Awards ===
Year	Award	Category	Result	Ref.
2017	Best Racing Game	Wired UK	Won	
2017	Best Racing Game	Red Bull	2nd place	
2017	Best Racing Game	Alphr	2nd place	
2017	Best Racing Game	TrustedReviews	2nd place	
2017	Gamescom 2017	Best Booth Award	Nominated	
2017	Gamescom 2017	Best Racing Game	Nominated	
2017	Gamescom 2017	Best Simulation Game	Won	
2017	Golden Joystick Awards	Best Audio	Nominated	
2017	The Game Awards 2017	Best Sports/Racing Game	Nominated	
2017	Titanium Awards	Best Sports/Driving Game	Nominated	
2017	Gameblog Awards 2017	Best Racing Game	Won	
2017	Game Critics Awards	Racing Game of the Year	Nominated	
2018	21st Annual D.I.C.E. Awards	Racing Game of the Year	Nominated	

== Sequel ==
In December 2018, Slightly Mad Studios' CEO Ian Bell confirmed the development of a new installment in the Project CARS series. It was released on August 28, 2020.
