= Grid (series) =

Racing video game series by Electronic Arts

- Logo of the first game
- Genre: Racing
- Developer: Codemasters
- Publishers: Codemasters; Electronic Arts
- Platforms: Microsoft Windows, PlayStation 3, Xbox 360, Nintendo DS, Arcade, OS X, Linux, iOS, Nintendo Switch, PlayStation 4, Xbox One, Stadia, Nintendo Switch 2, PlayStation 5, Xbox Series X/S, Android
- First release: Race Driver: Grid; 30 May 2008
- Latest release: Grid Legends; 25 February 2022

Grid (Stylised as GRID) is the racing video game series developed by Codemasters and published by Electronic Arts. It serves as the successor of TOCA Race Driver series.

== Games ==
Aggregate review scores
Game	Metacritic
Race Driver: Grid	(PS3) 87/100 (X360) 87/100 (PC) 87/100 (DS) 79/100
Grid 2	(PS3) 82/100 (PC) 80/100 (X360) 78/100
Grid Autosport	(iOS) 90/100 (NS) 79/100 (PC) 78/100 (PS3) 75/100 (X360) 75/100
Grid	(XONE) 79/100 (PC) 74/100 (PS4) 73/100
Grid Legends	(PS5) 76/100 (PC) 75/100 (XBSX) 73/100

=== Race Driver: Grid (2008) ===
Developed under the working title Race Driver One, Race Driver: Grid was released for Xbox 360, PlayStation 3, Nintendo DS, and Games for Windows in June 2008. Before its release, over one million people downloaded the demo. It features an improved graphics engine (a common complaint was that even on the lowest setting the graphics couldn't be handled by low-spec PCs) from Colin McRae: Dirt, has over 40 real-life cars and a variety of both fictional and realistic interpretations of tracks.

=== Grid 2 (2013) ===
Codemasters released the sequel to Race Driver: GRID, Grid 2 in May 2013 on Microsoft Windows, PlayStation 3 and Xbox 360.

=== Grid Autosport (2014) ===
Grid Autosport attempts to move the series back towards "more authentic racing games" following the release of Grid 2, which Codemasters felt was not as well-received by the company's core fanbase as they hoped. The developers consequently introduced major modifications to the handling model and built a lean, race-first oriented design for this title. It is available for Microsoft Windows, PlayStation 3, Xbox 360, Linux, iOS, Android, and Nintendo Switch.

=== Grid (2019) ===
A fourth installment in the Grid series, simply known as Grid, was released on 11 October 2019 for Microsoft Windows, PlayStation 4, and Xbox One, and November for Stadia. It features vehicles from the Le Mans GT and Daytona Prototype. The game was developed under Fernando Alonso's consultation and employs a new AI system, called "Nemesis". Opponents can be driven by up to 400 different AI profiles, each simulating different driving styles and behaviours.

=== Grid Legends (2022) ===
A fifth installment in the Grid series, known as Grid Legends, was released on 25 February 2022 for Microsoft Windows, macOS, PlayStation 4, PlayStation 5, Xbox One and Xbox Series X/S.

It was added to Nintendo Switch 2 in January 2026.
