= Index of DOS games (N) =

This is an index of DOS games.

This list has been split into multiple pages. Please use the Table of Contents to browse it.

Title	Released	Developer(s)	Publisher(s)
NAM	1998	Team TNT	GT Interactive
Napoleon in Russia: Borodino 1812	1988	Krentek Software	Datasoft
NASCAR Racing	1994	Papyrus Design Group	Virgin Interactive, Sierra On-Line
NASCAR Racing 2	1996	Papyrus Design Group	Papyrus Design Group, Sierra On-Line
Navy Seals	1990	Ocean Software	Ocean Software
Navy Strike	1995	Rowan Software	Empire Interactive
NBA Jam Tournament Edition	1994	Iguana Entertainment	Acclaim Entertainment
NBA Live 95	1994	Hitmen Productions	Electronic Arts
NBA Live 96	1995	Electronic Arts	Electronic Arts
NBA Live 97	1996	Electronic Arts	Electronic Arts
Need for Speed	1994	EA Canada, Pioneer Productions	Electronic Arts
Need for Speed - Special Edition	1996	EA Seattle, Pioneer Productions	Electronic Arts
Nemesis: The Wizardry Adventure	1996	Sir-Tech	Sir-Tech
Nemesis Go Master	1994	Toyogo, Inc.	Toyogo, Inc.
NeoHunter	1996	Ronin Entertainment	Virgin Interactive
Nerves of Steel	1995	Rainmaker Software	Merit Studios
NetHack	1987	Unknown	Unknown
Netherworld	1988	Jukka Tapanimäki	Hewson Consultants
NetMech	1996	Activision	Activision
Net:ZONE	1996	Compro Games	GameTek
Network Q RAC Rally	1993	Pixelcraft	Accolade, Eurocraft
Network Q RAC Rally Championship	1996	Magnetic Fields	Europress
Neuromancer	1988	Interplay Productions	Interplay Productions
The NeverEnding Story II: The Next Chapter	1991	Linel	Merit Studios
Nevermind	1989	Psygnosis	Psyclapse
Neverwinter Nights	1991	Stormfront Studios	Strategic Simulations
NFL Challenge	1985	XOR Corporation	XOR Corporation
NFL Pro League Football	1989	Micro Sports	Micro Sports
NFL Quarterback Club 96	1995	Iguana Entertainment	Acclaim Entertainment
NHL Hockey	1993	Electronic Arts	EA Sports
NHL 95	1994	EA Canada, Pioneer Productions	EA Sports
NHL 96	1995	EA Canada, Pioneer Productions	EA Sports
NHL 97	1996	EA Canada	EA Sports
Nibbles	1991	Rick Raddatz	Microsoft
Nick Faldo's Championship Golf	1993	Arc Developments	Grandslam Entertainment
Nigel Mansell's World Championship	1993	Gremlin Graphics	GameTek
Night Hawk: F-117A Stealth Fighter 2.0	1991	Microprose	Microprose
Night Mission Pinball	1982	Sublogic	Sublogic
Night Raid	1992	Software Creations	Software Creations
Night Shift	1990	Lucasfilm Games	Lucasfilm Games
Night Stalker	1983	Unknown	Mattel Electronics
Night Trap	1994	Digital Pictures	Digital Pictures
Nightmare on Elm Street, A	1989	Westwood Studios	Monarch Development
Nine Princes in Amber	1987	Trillium Corp.	Trillium Corp.
Ninja Gaiden	1990	Hi-Tech Expressions	Hi-Tech Expressions
Ninja Gaiden II: The Dark Sword of Chaos	1991	Manley & Associates	GameTek
Ninja Rabbits	1991	MicroValue	MicroValue
Nitemare 3D	1994	Gray Design Associates	Gray Design Associates
Nobunaga's Ambition	1988	KOEI	KOEI
Noctis	2001	Home Sweet Pixel	Home Sweet Pixel
Noctropolis	1994	Flashpoint Productions	Electronic Arts
Nomad	1993	Intense! Interactive, Papyrus Design Group	GameTek
Nord and Bert Couldn't Make Head or Tail of It	1987	Infocom	Infocom
Normality	1996	Gremlin Interactive	Interplay Productions
Norse by Norse West: The Return of the Lost Vikings	1992	Silicon & Synapse	Interplay Productions
North & South	1989	Infogrames	Infogrames
Nova 9: The Return of Gir Draxon	1991	Dynamix	Sierra On-Line
Novastorm	1994	Psygnosis	Sony Electronic Publishing
Nuclear War	1989	New World Computing	U.S. Gold
Number Munchers	1990	MECC	MECC
