= NASCAR Racing =

Series of racing video games

- Genre: Racing
- Developer: Papyrus Design Group
- Publishers: Papyrus; Sierra; Aspyr
- Platforms: MS-DOS, Mac, PlayStation, Windows
- First release: NASCAR Racing; 1994
- Latest release: NASCAR Racing 2003 Season; 2003

NASCAR Racing was a series of car racing video games originally developed by Papyrus Design Group in the 1990s. The series started in 1994 and ended with the release of NASCAR Racing 2003 Season in 2003. Later NASCAR games were released by Electronic Arts who, through their EA Sports brand, took over the official NASCAR license. This article deals with the original series release, NASCAR Racing.

== Games ==
Titles in the NASCAR Racing series
Title	Release	Platform	Publisher
NASCAR Racing	1994	MS-DOS, Mac	Papyrus
NASCAR: Track Pack	1995	MS-DOS	Papyrus
NASCAR Racing	1996	PlayStation	Sierra
NASCAR Racing 2	1996	MS-DOS	Sierra
Grand National Series Expansion Pack	1997	MS-DOS	Sierra
NASCAR Racing 1999 Edition	1999	Windows	Sierra
NASCAR Racing 3	1999	Windows	Sierra
NASCAR Legends	1999	Windows	Sierra
NASCAR Craftsman Truck Series Racing	1999	Windows	Sierra
NASCAR Racing 3 Craftsman Truck Series Expansion Pack	2000	Windows	Sierra
NASCAR Racing 4	2001	Windows	Sierra
NASCAR Racing 2002 Season	2002	Windows, Mac	Sierra, Aspyr
NASCAR Racing 2003 Season	2003	Windows, Mac	Sierra, Aspyr

== Gameplay ==
Damage is realistically modeled, but can be turned off to make the player's car indestructible. The effect of crashes varies depending on severity. Very minor impacts have no effect. Heavier impacts can cause sheet metal damage, which hurts aerodynamics and may cause engine overheating. A crumpled hood can also make it difficult for the player to see the track. Heavy impacts will damage a wheel or even blow the engine. Damage can be repaired in the pit stop, except for blown engines which are not repairable. Damaged sheet metal is removed, making for an imperfect repair with impaired aerodynamics.

The vehicle's sensitivity to crash impacts was increased in a patch to the game. In the readme file attached to this patch, Papyrus explained that the primary motivation for this change was multiplayer mode, where violent players had previously been able to achieve faster lap times by deliberately hitting walls.

Repairs require a considerable amount of time (generally 1 minute or longer) to complete. This combined with the impaired performance means that damaged vehicles will not contend for a high finish, but can still race for points which accumulate in the season standings. This game uses a scoring system similar to what NASCAR was using at the time, where all finishing positions earn a varying number of points.

The engine will fail if over-revved, and it can also fail from overheating (but such a scenario is rare).

Yellow flags can also be turned off and players can run any race distances of their choosing. The speed of computer opponents is also adjustable, providing a competitive race for players of varying skill levels.

The game contains many real-life drivers. The game is the first stock car racing simulator to include real sponsors on their respective cars. Alcohol and tobacco sponsors were removed, but alternate car sets from fans restored many of these.

NASCAR Racing also gives players the ability to set up their car in a realistic manner by adjusting the airdam height, rear spoiler angle, gear ratios, shocks, tire pressures, cambers and more.

Driving physics are realistically modeled in the game. The adjustable variables have a significant effect on handling, and the tires themselves will grip differently depending on wear and temperature.

Tires are modeled in much detail. The game keeps track of 3 temperatures for each tire, reflecting temperatures at the center, inner, and outer edges. Numerous variables can influence tire temperatures. For example, an underinflated tire will tend to heat more at the edges rather than the center. An incorrect camber setting can cause one edge to heat more than the other. Temperatures are also influenced by many other factors such as weight distribution, toe-in, driver behavior, and the cornering characteristics of the race track. Tires in the game perform optimally at elevated temperatures, but if they heat excessively this effect is lost. The player can view current tire temperatures using an in-game keyboard command.

Dedicated players can spend a great deal of time optimizing the car's setup to perform at its best on a particular race track. This testing process is normally performed using the game's Practice or Testing modes. The player's setup can be saved to disk for future recall, and the game also provides a few prefabricated setups for each track.

Vehicles cannot lift into the air. The graphics system always renders them with all 4 wheels on the ground, although the physics system may attribute wheels with varying amounts of downforce (potentially resulting in no traction).

The Doppler effect is simulated. Vehicles approaching at high relative speed will emit a higher frequency engine sound, which will shift to a lower frequency as they pass.

A separate program called the Paintkit was included with NASCAR Racing, which allowed users to design their own race cars and import them into the game. As well as this, players could change the car type (Chevrolet Lumina, Ford Thunderbird or Pontiac Grand Prix) and the brand of tires used (Goodyear or Hoosier).

== Soundtrack ==
Former racer-turned-broadcaster, Ned Jarrett loaned his voice to the game's title sequence, saying, "I'm Ned Jarrett. From Papyrus, this is NASCAR Racing". These were the only spoken words heard in the game as there was no in-race commentary or communication from the crew chief. Music for the game was provided by members of Skid Row, including bass player Rachel Bolan who also appeared in the game as a driver of a green-and-purple No. 00 car with the letters "RB" on the hood.

== Modifications ==
Several mods were made available through various websites, including updated NASCAR seasons and car shapes, the 24 Hours of Daytona cars (with three car shapes), classic NASCAR seasons, touring cars and more. Users created versions of Daytona International Speedway, Las Vegas Motor Speedway and Texas Motor Speedway – edited from versions produced by Papyrus for later NASCAR Racing releases such as NASCAR 3 – for use in NASCAR 2. Numerous utilities were developed for NASCAR Racing too, including AI editors, season editors and track editors.

== Reception ==
NASCAR Racing was a major commercial success. Its sales reached 350,000 units by December 1995, following its October 1994 release, and rose to 400,000 copies by February 1996. In the United States, NASCAR Racing (bundled with its Track Pack add-on) was the 24th best-selling computer game of 1998, with another 225,737 units sold. Its revenue for that year was estimated at $2.28 million. NASCAR Racing and its sequel shipped above 2 million copies globally by March 1998.
