= Racing video game =

Video game genre

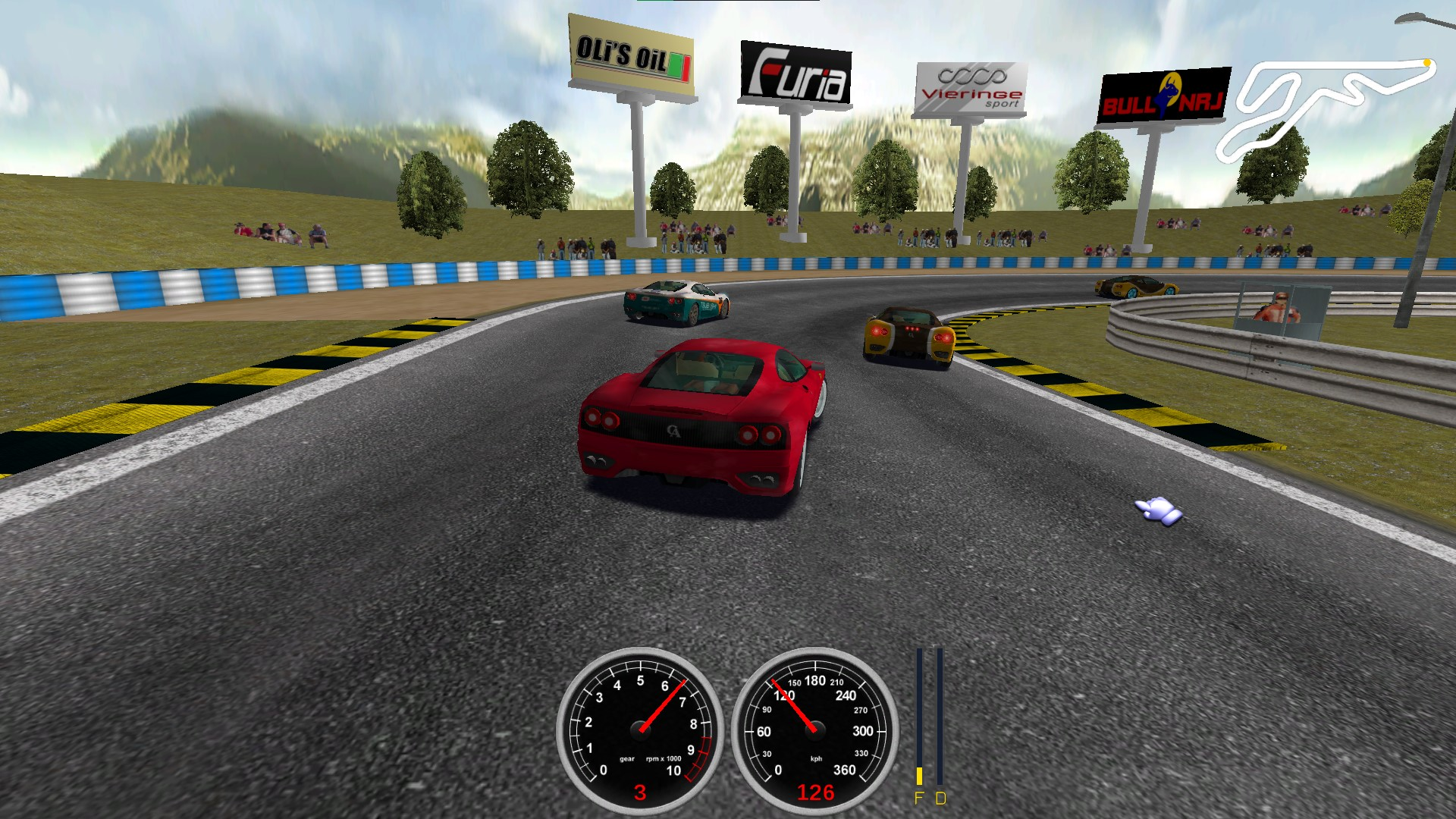
Screenshot of Speed Dreams, a free and open-source racing video game

Racing games are a video game genre in which the player participates in a racing competition. They may be based on anything from real-world racing leagues to fantastical settings. They are distributed along a spectrum between more realistic racing simulations and more fantastical arcade-style racing games. Kart racing games emerged in the 1990s as a popular sub-genre of the latter. Racing games may also fall under the category of sports video games.

== Sub-genres ==
=== Arcade-style racing ===
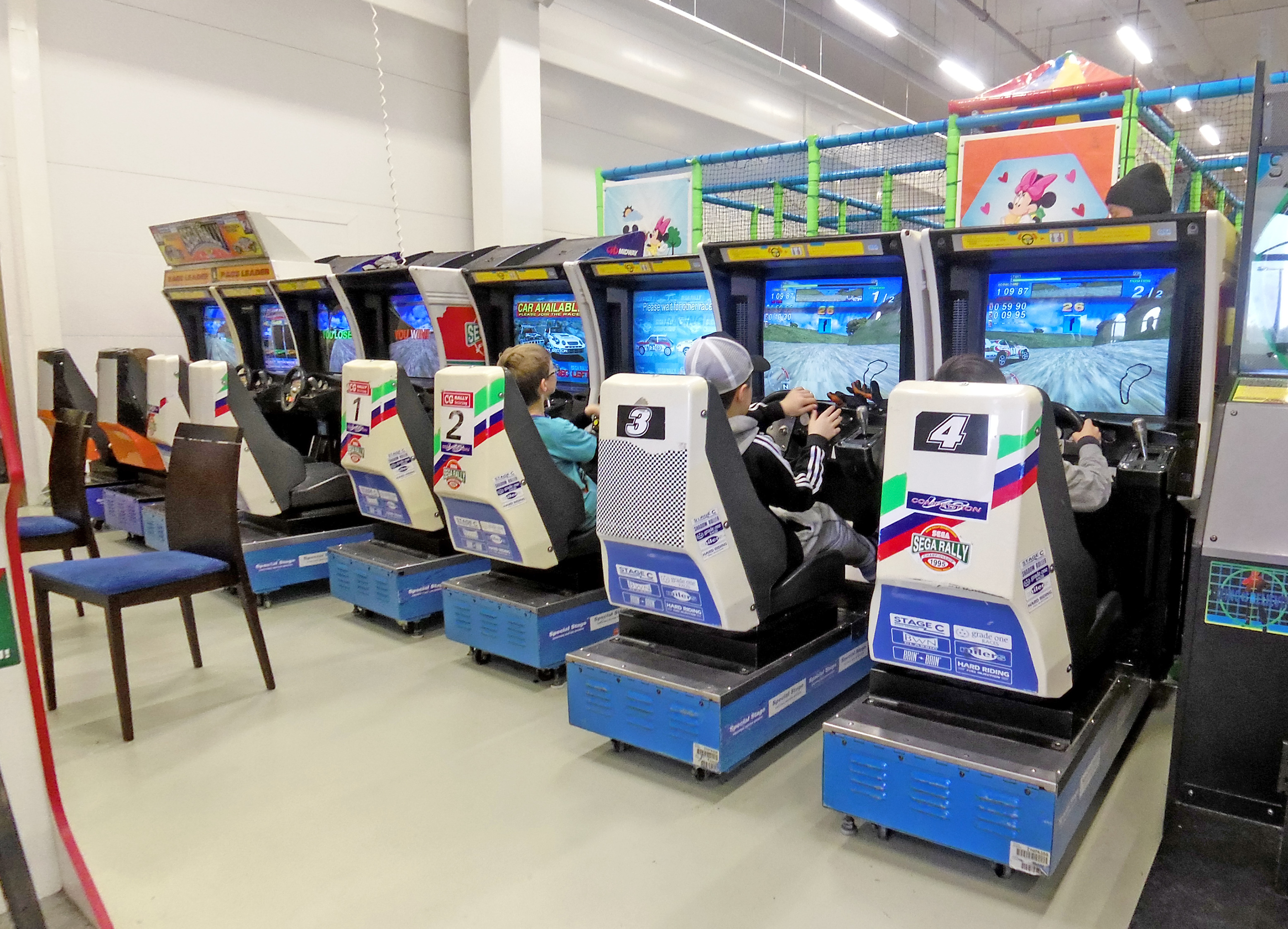
Sega Rally arcade racing games at the Veljekset Keskinen department store in Tuuri, Finland in 2017

Usually, arcade-style racing games put fun and a fast-paced experience above all else, as cars usually compete in unique ways. A key feature of arcade-style racers that specifically distinguishes them from simulation racers is their far more liberal physics. Whereas in real racing (and subsequently, the simulation equivalents) the driver must reduce their speed significantly to take most turns, arcade-style racing games generally encourage the player to "powerslide" the car to allow the player to keep up their speed by drifting through a turn. Collisions with other racers, track obstacles, or traffic vehicles is usually much more exaggerated than simulation racers as well. For the most part, arcade-style racers simply remove the precision and rigor required from the simulation experience and focus strictly on the racing element itself. They often license real cars and leagues, but are equally open to more exotic settings and vehicles. Races take place on highways, winding roads, or in cities; they can be multiple-lap circuits or point-to-point sprints, with one or multiple paths sometimes with checkpoints, or other types of competition, like demolition derby, jumping, or testing driving skills. Popular arcade-style racing franchises include Battle Gear, Out Run, Ridge Racer, Daytona USA, Need for Speed, Sega Rally, Cruis'n, Burnout, Rush, Midnight Club, Project Gotham Racing, TrackMania, MotorStorm and Forza Horizon.

Conversely, many arcade racing games in amusement arcades frequently use hydraulic motion simulator arcade cabinets that simulate the look and feel of driving or riding a vehicle. For example, a motorbike that the player sits on and moves around to control the on-screen action, or a car-like cabinet (with seats, steering wheel, pedals and gear stick) that moves around in sync with the on-screen action. This has been especially common for arcade racing games from Sega since the 1980s. However, this can typically only be found in arcade racing games for amusement arcades, rather than arcade-style racing games for home systems.

During the mid-late 2000s there was a trend of new street racing; imitating the import scene, one can tune sports compacts and sports cars and race them on the streets. The most widely known ones are the Midnight Club 3: DUB Edition and the Midnight Club series, certain entries in the Need for Speed and Test Drive series, Initial D series, the Juiced series and FlatOut 2. Some arcade-style racing games increase the competition between racers by adding weapons that can be used against opponents to slow them down or otherwise impede their progress so they can be passed. This is a staple feature in kart racing games such as the Mario Kart series, but this kind of game mechanic also appears in standard, car-based racing games as well. Weapons can range from projectile attacks to traps as well as non-combative items like speed boosts. Weapon-based racing games include games such as Full Auto, Rumble Racing, Grip: Combat Racing, Re-Volt and Blur. There are also Vehicular combat games that employ racing games elements: for example, racing has been featured as a game mode in popular vehicular combat franchises such as Twisted Metal, Destruction Derby and Carmageddon.

=== Simulation racing ===
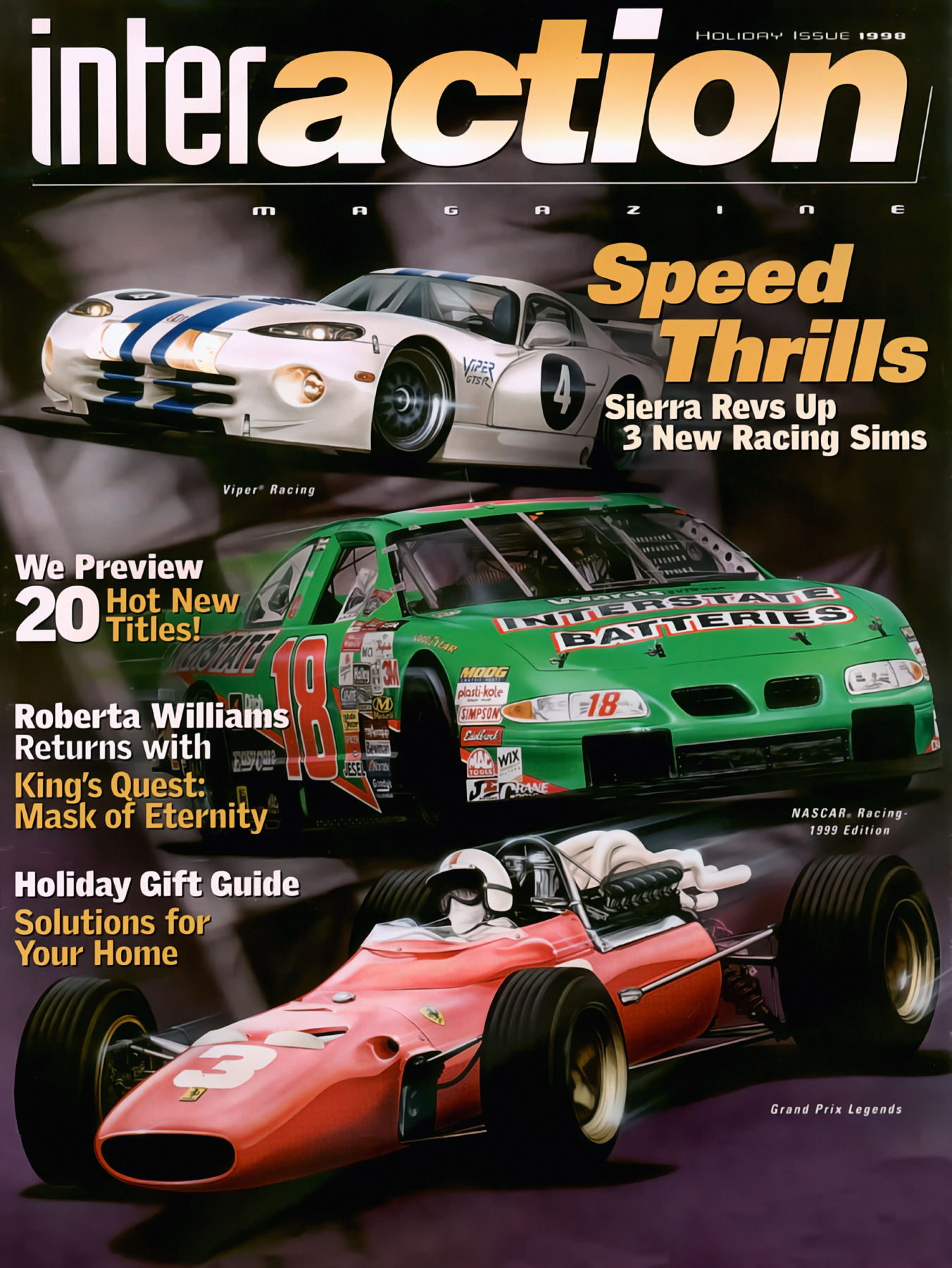
Sierra On-Line was a leading publisher of 1990s simulation racing games, including titles like NASCAR Racing 1999 Edition and Grand Prix Legends.

Simulation style racing games strive to convincingly replicate the handling of a real automobile. They often license real cars or racing leagues, but will sometimes use fantasy cars built to resemble real ones if unable to acquire an official license for them. Vehicular behavior physics are a key factor in the experience. The rigors of being a professional race driver are usually also included (such as having to deal with a car's tire condition and fuel level). Proper cornering technique and precision racing maneuvers (such as trail braking) are given priority in simulation racing games.

Although these racing simulators are specifically built for people with a high grade of driving skill, it is not uncommon to find aids that can be enabled from the game menu. The most common aids are traction control (TC), anti-lock brakes (ABS), steering assistance, damage resistance, clutch assistance, and automatic gear changes.

Sound plays a crucial role in player feedback in racing games, with the engine and tire sounds communicating what is physically happening to the car. The three main elements of car audio are intake, exhaust, and internal engine sounds. Recorded samples of those elements are implemented in-game by methods such as granular synthesis, loop-based modelling, or physical modeling. Tire sounds modulate loop samples or pitch based on slip angle and deformation to let the player know the limit of grip. The best sounding games effectively integrate the sound model with the vehicle and tire simulation models.

Some of these racing simulators are customizable, as game fans have decoded the tracks, cars, and executable files. Internet communities have grown around the simulators regarded as the most realistic and many websites host internet championships. Some of these racing simulators consist of Forza Motorsport, Gran Turismo, GTR2, Assetto Corsa, iRacing, Project CARS, Automobilista 2 and many more.

=== Kart racing ===
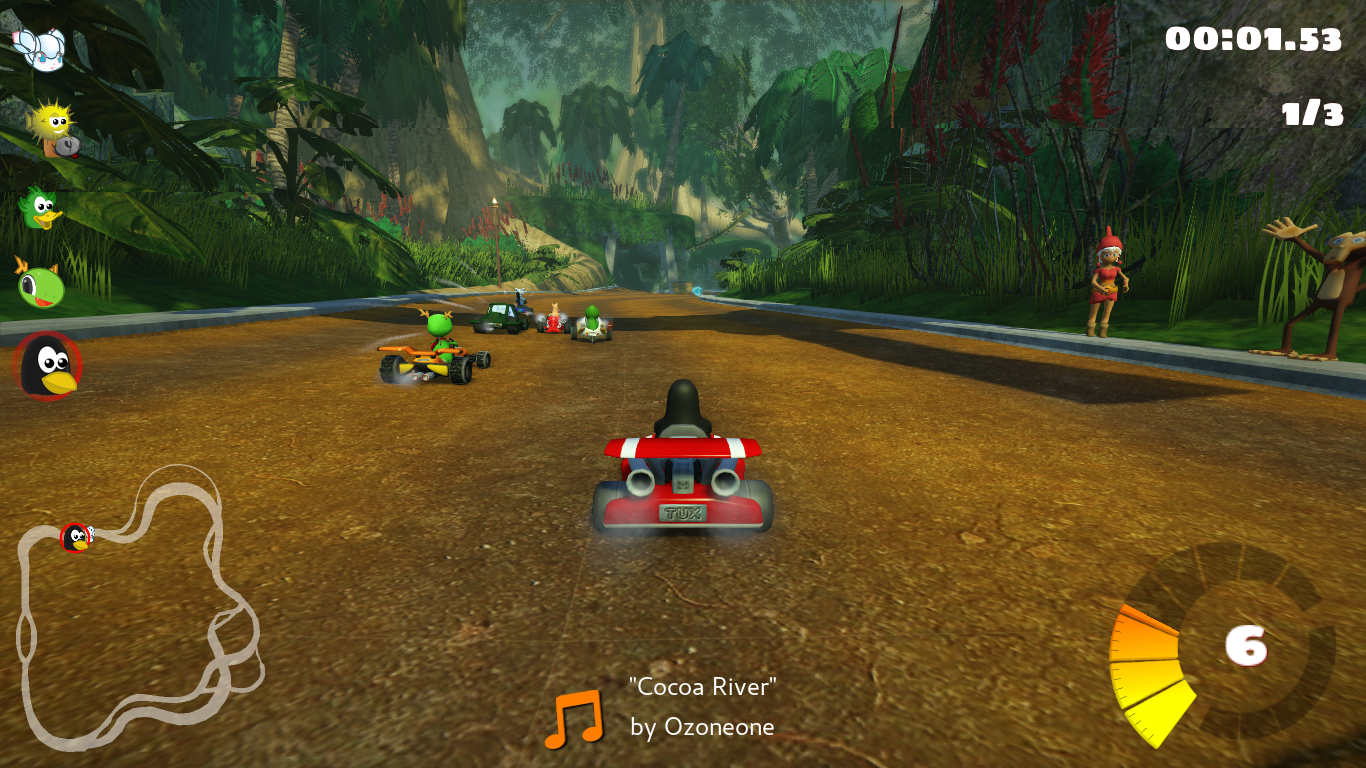
SuperTuxKart, an example of a kart racing video game

Kart racing games have simplified driving mechanics while adding obstacles, unusual track designs and various action elements. Kart racers are also known to cast characters known from various platform games or cartoon television series as the drivers of "wacky" vehicles. Kart racing games are a more arcade-like experience than other racing games and usually offer modes in which player characters can shoot projectiles at one another or collect power-ups. Typically, in such games, vehicles move more alike go-karts, lacking anything along the lines of a gear stick and clutch pedal.

While car combat elements date back to earlier titles such as Taito's Crashing Race in 1976, the kart racing subgenre was popularised by Nintendo's Super Mario Kart in 1992 for the Super Nintendo Entertainment System (SNES), which spawned the Mario Kart series. The game was slower than other racing games of the time due to hardware limitations, prompting the developers to use a go-kart theme for the game. Since then, over 50 kart racing games have been released, featuring characters ranging from Nicktoons to South Park.

=== Anti-gravity racing ===
Anti-gravity racing games are a type of racing game where players use vehicles that hover or glide using anti-gravity technology to race against the clock or other competitors. These games often feature science fiction themes, with high-tech vehicles and futuristic track designs. A number of anti-gravity racing games may also feature vehicular combat elements.

In the arcades, anti-gravity racing games (originally known as futuristic racers) date back to the 1980s. The laserdisc games Star Rider (1983) and Cosmos Circuit (1984) featured animated racing, using animated laserdisc video for the backgrounds. Alpha Denshi's Splendor Blast (1985) combined Pole Position style racing with Zaxxon style sci-fi vehicles, space settings and shoot 'em up elements. STUN Runner (1989) by Atari Games featured 3D polygon graphics and allowed players to blast other vehicles.

On home consoles, anti-gravity racing games were defined by Nintendo's F-Zero (1990) for the SNES, which spawned the F-Zero series. The PlayStation game Wipeout (1995) by Psygnosis featured 3D polygon graphics and spawned the Wipeout series. The F-Zero series subsequently made the transition to 3D polygon graphics with F-Zero X (1998) for the Nintendo 64.

== History ==
=== 1941–1976: Electro-mechanical driving games ===
The basis for racing video games were arcade driving electro-mechanical games (EM games). The earliest mechanical racing arcade game dates back to 1900, when the London-based Automatic Sports Company manufactured a mechanical yacht racing game, Yacht Racer. Mechanical car driving games later originated from British amusement arcades in the 1930s. In the United States, International Mutoscope Reel Company adapted these British arcade driving games into the electro-mechanical game Drive Mobile (1941), which had an upright arcade cabinet similar to what arcade video games would later use. A steering wheel was used to control a model car over a road painted on a metal drum, with the goal being to keep the car centered as the road shifts left and right. Kasco introduced this type of driving game to Japan as Mini Drive in 1958. Capitol Projector's 1954 machine Auto Test was a driving test simulation that used film reel to project pre-recorded driving video footage, awarding the player points for making correct decisions as the footage is played. These early EM driving games consisted of only the player vehicle on the road, with no rival cars to race against.

EM driving games later evolved in Japan, with Kasco's 1968 racing game Indy 500, which was licensed by Chicago Coin for release in North America as Speedway in 1969. It had a circular racetrack with rival cars painted on individual rotating discs illuminated by a lamp, which produced colorful graphics projected using mirrors to give a pseudo-3D first-person perspective on a screen, resembling a windscreen view. The gameplay involved players driving down a circular road while dodging cars to avoid crashing, and it resembled a prototypical arcade racing video game, with an upright cabinet, yellow marquee, three-digit scoring, coin box, steering wheel and accelerator pedal. Indy 500 sold over 2,000 arcade cabinets in Japan, while Speedway sold over 10,000 cabinets in North America, becoming one of the biggest arcade hits of the 1960s. Taito's similar 1970 rear-projection driving game Super Road 7 involved driving a car down an endlessly scrolling road while having to dodge cars, which formed the basis for Taito's 1974 racing video game Speed Race.

One of the last successful electro-mechanical arcade games was F-1, a racing game developed and released by Namco in 1976, and distributed in North America by Atari the same year. The gameplay is viewed from the perspective of the driver's viewpoint, which is displayed on the screen using a projector system. It was Japan's highest-grossing arcade game for two years in a row, in 1976 and 1977. F-1 is believed to have been influenced by Indy 500, and would in turn be influential on Namco's racing video games in the 1980s. Another notable EM game from the 1970s was The Driver, a racing-action game released by Kasco (Kansai Seiki Seisakusho Co.) that used 16 mm film to project full motion video on screen, though its gameplay had limited interaction, requiring the player to match their steering wheel, accelerator and brakes with movements shown on screen, much like the sequences in later LaserDisc games.

=== 1970: Mainframe racing game ===
The BBC television program Tomorrow's World broadcast a mainframe computer racing game played between TV presenter Raymond Baxter and British two-time Formula One world champion Graham Hill on their 1970 Christmas special, broadcast on Christmas Eve, 1970. The game was written by IBM-employee, Ray Bradshaw, using CALL/360 and required two data centre operators to input the instructions.

=== 1972–1988: Top-down 2D racing video games ===
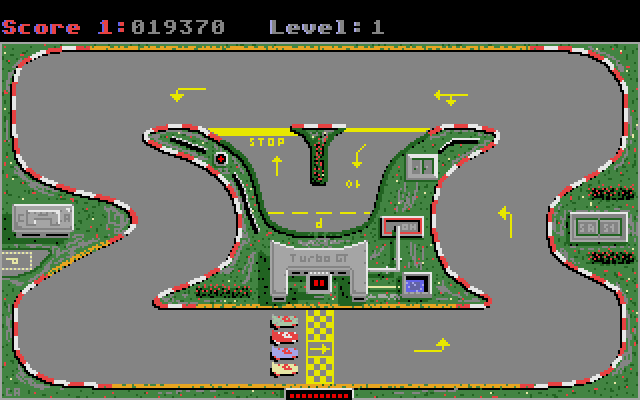
Turbo GT (1986) by ERE Informatique, an example of a top-down racing game

Atari founder Nolan Bushnell had the idea for a driving video game in the early 1970s. When he was a college student, he worked at an arcade where he became familiar with EM driving games, watching customers play and helping to maintain the machinery, while learning how it worked and developing his understanding of how the game business operates. When he founded Atari, Bushnell had originally planned to develop a driving video game, influenced by Speedway, but they ended up developing Pong (1972) instead.

The earliest rudimentary racing video game to be released dates back to 1972, with the release of the first video game console, the Magnavox Odyssey. It included a game called Wipeout, where the player moves a dot around a race track that is outlined by an overlay placed on the television screen. It required the use of physical items to play, including a race game board, screen overlay, car tokens and pit stop cards. In 1973, Atari released Space Race, an arcade video game where players control spaceships that race against opposing ships, while avoiding comets and meteors. It is a competitive two-player game with black and white graphics and controlled with a two-way joystick. The following year, Atari released the first driving video game in the arcades, Gran Trak 10, which presents an overhead single-screen view of the track in low resolution white-on-black graphics. It inspired the Kee Games clone Formula K, which sold 5,000 arcade cabinets.

In late 1974, Taito released Speed Race designed by Tomohiro Nishikado (of Space Invaders fame), in which the player drives down a straight track dodging other cars. The game used vertical scrolling, inspired by two older electro-mechanical games: Kasco's Mini Drive and Taito's Super Road 7. Speed Race was re-branded as Wheels by Midway Games for release in North America and was influential on later racing games. Midway also released another version, Racer, with a sit-down cabinet. Speed Race became a hit in Japan, while Wheels and Wheels II sold 10,000 cabinets in the United States. Its use of vertical scrolling was adopted by Atari's Hi-way (1975), which introduced a sit-down cabinet similar to older electro-mechanical games.

In 1977, Atari released Super Bug, a racing game historically significant as "the first game to feature a scrolling playfield" in multiple directions. Sega's Monaco GP (1979) was one of the most successful traditional 2D racing games, becoming the most popular arcade driving game in the US in 1981, and among the highest-grossing games that year, while making a record number of appearances on the RePlay arcade charts through 1987. In 1980, Namco's overhead-view driving game Rally-X was one of the first games to have background music, and allowed scrolling in multiple directions, both vertical and horizontal. It also uses a radar, to show the rally car's location on the map.

=== 1976–1992: Pseudo-3D racing video games ===
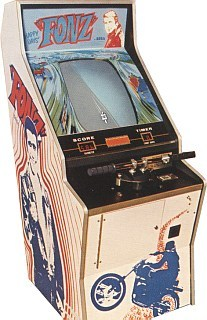
Fonz (1976) upright arcade cabinet

In February 1976, Sega released the arcade game Road Race, which was re-worked into a motorbike variant Moto-Cross, also known as Man T.T. (released August 1976). It was then re-branded as Fonz in the US, as a tie-in for the popular sitcom Happy Days. The game featured a three-dimensional perspective view, as well as haptic feedback, which caused the motorcycle handlebars to vibrate during a collision with another vehicle. In Spring 1976, the arcade game Nürburgring 1 presented a first-person view. Considered the first "scandalous" arcade game, Exidy's Death Race (1976) was widely criticized in the media for its violent content, which only served to substantially increase its popularity. Sega released a two-player version of Man T.T. called Twin Course T.T. in January 1977. 1979 saw the release of Vectorbeam's Speed Freak, a three-dimensional vector racing game, which Killer List of Videogames calls "very impressive and ahead of their time". Turbo, released by Sega in 1981, was the first racing game to use sprite scaling with full-color graphics.

Pole Position, developed by Namco and released by Atari in North America, was released in 1982. It is considered "arguably the most important racing game ever made." It was an evolution of Namco's earlier racing electro-mechanical games, notably F-1 (1976), whose designer Sho Osugi worked on Pole Position. Pole Position was the first video game to be based on a real racing circuit, and the first with a qualifying lap, where the player needs to complete a time trial before they can compete in Grand Prix races. While not the first third-person racing video game (it was predated by Sega's Turbo), Pole Position established the conventions of the genre and its success inspired numerous imitators. According to Electronic Games, for "the first time in the amusement parlors, a first-person racing game gives a higher reward for passing cars and finishing among the leaders rather than just for keeping all four wheels on the road". According to IGN, it also "introduced checkpoints," and its success, as "the highest-grossing arcade game of 1983 in North America, cemented the genre in place for decades to come and inspired a horde of other racing games". It sold over 21,000 arcade cabinets in the US by 1983, and again became the highest-grossing arcade game of 1984 in the US.

Taito's Laser Grand Prix, introduced in July 1983, was the first racing laserdisc game, using pre-recorded live-action footage. In 1984, several other racing laserdisc games followed, including Sega's GP World with live-action footage and Universal's Top Gear featuring 3D animated race car driving. The same year, Irem's The Battle-Road was a vehicle combat racing game with branching paths and up to 32 possible routes. Geoff Crammond, who later developed the Grandprix series (Known collectively as GPX to its fanbase), produced what is considered the first attempt at a racing simulator on a home system, REVS, released for the BBC Microcomputer. The game offered an unofficial (and hence with no official team or driver names associated with the series) recreation of British Formula 3. The hardware capabilities limited the depth of the simulation and restricted it (initially) to one track, but it offered a semi-realistic driving experience with more detail than most other racing games at the time.

Since the mid-1980s, it became a trend for arcade racing games to use hydraulic motion simulator arcade cabinets. The trend was sparked by Sega's "taikan" games, with "taikan" meaning "body sensation" in Japanese. The "taikan" trend began when Yu Suzuki's team at Sega (later known as Sega AM2) developed Hang-On (1985), a racing video game where the player sits on and moves a motorbike replica to control the in-game actions. Hang-On was a Grand Prix style motorbike racer. It used force feedback technology and was also one of the first arcade games to use 16-bit graphics and Sega's "Super Scaler" technology that allowed pseudo-3D sprite-scaling at high frame rates. Hang-On became the highest-grossing arcade game of 1986 in the United States, and one of the year's highest-grossing arcade games in Japan and London.

Suzuki's team at Sega followed it with hydraulic motion simulator cockpit cabinets for later racing games, notably Out Run (1986). It was one of the most graphically impressive games of its time, known for its pseudo-3D sprite-based driving engine, and it became an instant classic that spawned many sequels. It was also notable for giving the player the non-linear choice of which route to take through the game and the choice of soundtrack to listen to while driving, represented as radio stations. The game has up to five endings depending on the route taken, and each one was an ending sequence rather than a simple "Congratulations" as was common in game endings at the time. It became Sega's best-selling arcade cabinet of the 1980s, with over 30,000 arcade cabinets sold worldwide. The same year, Durell released Turbo Esprit, which had an official Lotus license, and working car indicator lights.

In 1987, Square released Rad Racer, one of the first stereoscopic 3D games. In the same year, Atari produced RoadBlasters, a driving game that also involved a bit of shooting.

One of the last successful pseudo-3D arcade racers was Sega's Super Monaco GP (1989), a simulation of the Monaco Grand Prix. It was the third highest-grossing arcade game of 1989 in Japan, and again the third highest-grossing arcade game of 1990 in Japan. In 1992, Nintendo released Super Mario Kart, but it was known that it was pseudo-3D racing. Here it has items to affect players from racing and the referee, Lakitu will help the player out to know the rules and rescue racers from falling down.

=== 1988–1994: Transition to 3D polygon graphics ===
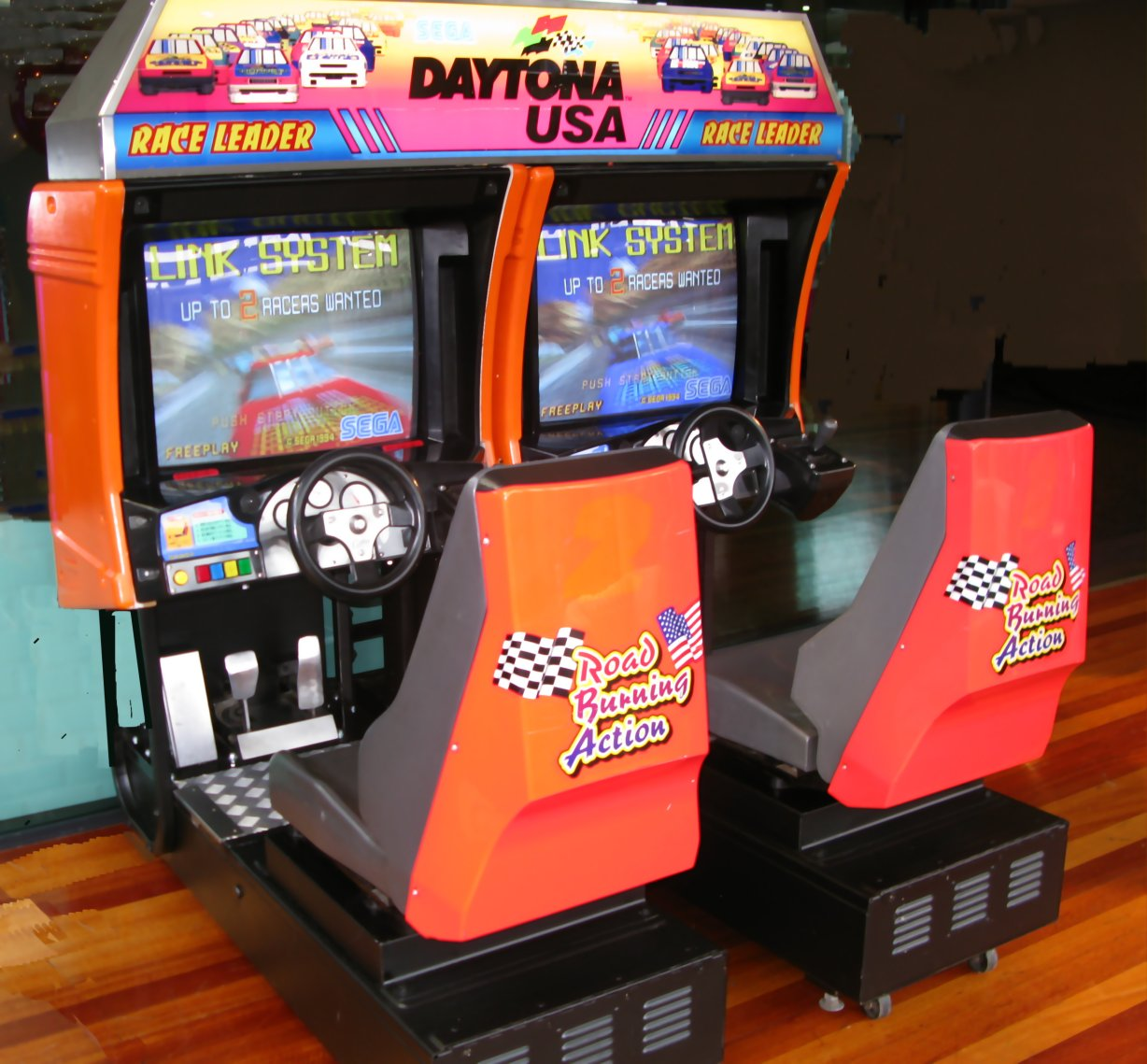
Daytona USA (1994) twin-seat arcade cabinet

In 1988, Namco released Winning Run, which used 3D polygon graphics. It became the second highest-grossing arcade game of 1989 in Japan. In 1989, Atari released Hard Drivin', another arcade driving game that used 3D polygon graphics. It uses force feedback, where the wheel fights the player during aggressive turns, and a crash replay camera view.

Sega produced Virtua Racing in 1992. While not the first arcade racing game with 3D graphics (it was predated by Winning Run, Hard Drivin' and Stunts), it was able to combine the best features of games at the time, along with multiplayer machine linking and clean 3D graphics to produce a game that was above and beyond the arcade market standard of its time, laying the foundations for subsequent 3D racing games. It improved on earlier 3D racing games with more complex 3D models and backdrops, higher frame rate, and switchable camera angles including chase-cam and first-person views. IGN considers it the third most influential racing game of all time.

In 1993, Namco released Ridge Racer. Its 3D polygon graphics stood out for the use of Gouraud shading and texture mapping. And thus began the polygon war of driving games. Sega later released Daytona USA, which featured 3D polygon graphics with texture filtering. The following year, Electronic Arts produced The Need for Speed, which would later spawn one of the world's most successful racing game series and one of the most successful video game series. In the same year, Midway introduced Cruis'n USA.

=== 1989–1995: Emergence of sim racing subgenre ===
The now defunct Papyrus Design Group produced their first attempt at a racing simulator in 1989, the critically acclaimed Indianapolis 500: The Simulation, designed by David Kaemmer and Omar Khudari. The game is generally regarded as the first true auto racing simulation on a personal computer. Accurately replicating the 1989 Indianapolis 500 grid, it offered advanced 3D graphics for its time, setup options, car failures and handling. Unlike most other racing games at the time, Indianapolis 500 attempted to simulate realistic physics and telemetry, such as its portrayal of the relationship between the four contact patches and the pavement, as well as the loss of grip when making a high-speed turn, forcing the player to adopt a proper racing line and believable throttle-to-brake interaction. It includes a garage facility to allow players to enact modifications to their vehicle, including adjustments to the tires, shocks and wings. The damage modelling, while not accurate by today's standards, was capable of producing some spectacular and entertaining pile-ups.

Crammond's Formula One Grand Prix in 1992 became the new champion of sim racing, until the release of Papyrus' IndyCar Racing the following year. Formula One Grand Prix boasted detail that was unparalleled for a computer game at the time as well as a full recreation of the drivers, cars and circuits of the 1991 Formula One World Championship. However, the U.S. version (known as World Circuit) was not granted an official license by the FIA, so teams and drivers were renamed (though all could be changed back to their real names using the Driver/Team selection menu): Ayrton Senna became "Carlos Sanchez", for example.

In 1995, Sega Rally Championship introduced rally racing and featured cooperative gameplay alongside the usual competitive multiplayer. Sega Rally was also the first to feature driving on different surfaces (including asphalt, gravel, and mud) with different friction properties and the car's handling changing accordingly, making it an important milestone in the genre.

=== 1996–present: Modern racing games ===
During the early-to-mid-1990s, SEGA and Namco largely had a monopoly on high-end arcade racing games with realistic 3D visuals. In 1996, a number of competitors attempted to challenge their dominance in the field, including Atari Games with San Francisco Rush: Extreme Racing, Gaelco with Speed Up, Jaleco with Super GT 24h, and Konami with Winding Heat. In 1996, Nintendo created a 3D game called Mario Kart 64, a sequel to Super Mario Kart and has an action so that Lakitu needs to either reverse, rev up your engines to Rocket Start, or rescue players. Mario Kart 64 focused more on the items used. Atari didn't join the 3D craze until 1997, when it introduced San Francisco Rush.

In 1997, Gran Turismo was released for the PlayStation, after being in production for five years since 1992. It was considered the most realistic racing simulation game in its time, combined with playability, enabling players of all skill levels to play. It offered a wealth of meticulous tuning options and introduced an open-ended career mode where players had to undertake driving tests to acquire driving licenses, earn their way into races and choose their own career path. The Gran Turismo series has since become the second-most successful racing game franchise of all time, selling over 100 million units worldwide as of June 2025.

By 1997, the typical PC was capable of matching an arcade machine in terms of graphical quality, mainly due to the introduction of first generation 3D accelerators such as 3DFX Voodoo. The faster CPUs were capable of simulating increasingly realistic physics, car control, and graphics.

Colin McRae Rally was introduced in 1998 to the PC world, and was a successful semi-simulation of the world of rally driving, previously only available in the less serious Sega Rally Championship. Motorhead, a PC game, was later adapted back to arcade. In the same year, Sega releases Daytona USA 2 (Battle On The Edge and Power Edition), which is one of the first racing games to feature realistic crashes and graphics.

The year 1999 introduced Crash Team Racing, a kart racing game featuring the characters from Crash Bandicoot. It was praised for its controls and courses. Crash Bandicoot and its racing series has continued, with the most recent game being Crash Team Racing: Nitro Fueled (June 2019). The year 1999 also marked a change of games into more "free form" worlds. Midtown Madness for the PC allows the player to explore a simplified version of the city of Chicago using a variety of vehicles and any path that they desire. In the arcade world, Sega introduced Crazy Taxi, a sandbox racing game where you are a taxi driver that needed to get the client to the destination in the shortest amount of time. A similar game also from Sega is Emergency Call Ambulance, with almost the same gameplay (pick up patient, drop off at hospital, as fast as possible). Games are becoming more and more realistic visually. Some arcade games are now featuring 3 screens to provide a surround view.

In 2000, Angel Studios (now Rockstar San Diego) introduced the first free-roaming, or the former "free form", racing game on video game consoles and handheld game consoles with Midnight Club: Street Racing which released on the PlayStation 2 and Game Boy Advance. The game allowed the player to drive anywhere around virtual recreations of London and New York. Instead of using enclosed tracks for races, the game uses various checkpoints on the free roam map as the pathway of the race, giving the player the option to take various shortcuts or any other route to the checkpoints of the race. In 2001 Namco released Wangan Midnight to the arcade and later released an upgrade called Wangan Midnight R. Wangan Midnight R was also ported to the PlayStation 2 by Genki as just Wangan Midnight. Also in 2008, Nintendo released Mario Kart Wii on the Wii which featured a Wii steering Wheel. It was the sixth installment of the Mario Kart series. It became one of the best selling video games of the 2000s.

In 2003, Rockstar San Diego's Midnight Club II was the first racing game to feature both playable cars and playable motorcycles. Namco released a sort of sequel to Wangan Midnight R called Wangan Midnight Maximum Tune.

Driving games encompass several styles, including action-oriented racing games such as Mario Kart World for the Nintendo Switch 2 and Sonic Racing: CrossWorlds, as well as simulation-focused titles such as Grand Prix Legends, iRacing, Virtual Grand Prix 3, Live for Speed, NetKar Pro, Assetto Corsa, GT Legends, GTR2, rFactor, X Motor Racing, CarX Street, and the iPad racing game Exhilarace.

== See also ==
- Formula One video games
- List of NASCAR video games
- List of racing video games
- Vehicle simulation game
- List of vehicular combat games
