= Rally Trophy =

2001 video game by Bugbear Entertainment

- European box art
- Developer: Bugbear Entertainment
- Publisher: JoWooD Productions
- Director: Janne Alanenpää
- Designers: Janne Alanenpää; Tatu Blomberg; Sami Räihä
- Programmer: Tatu Blomberg
- Artists: Mikko Kautto; Hannu Leskinen; Sami Räihä
- Platform: Microsoft Windows
- Release: EU: November 16, 2001; NA: November 20, 2001
- Genre: Racing
- Modes: Single-player, multiplayer

Rally Trophy is a 2001 historic PC rally simulation, developed by Bugbear Entertainment and published by JoWooD Productions for the Microsoft Windows operating system in 2001. A version for Xbox was also announced but never released. A demo version of the game was published in October 2001. In the first two days, the demo was downloaded 150.000 times.

== Reception ==
Reception

Aggregate score
| Aggregator | Score |
|---|---|
| Metacritic | 82/100 |

Review scores
| Publication | Score |
|---|---|
| Computer Games Magazine | 4/5 |
| Computer Gaming World | 4/5 |
| Eurogamer | 7/10 |
| GameSpot | 8.7/10 |
| GameSpy | (favorable) |
| GameZone | 9/10 |
| IGN | 7.6/10 |
| Jeuxvideo.com | 15/20 |
| PC Gamer (US) | 89% |
| PC Zone | 80% |

Rally Trophy received "favorable" reviews according to the review aggregation website Metacritic. The Finnish gaming magazine Pelit summarized that "Rally Trophy sets the standard for all future driving games. The graphics are absolutely stunning and the lack of inspiring game modes is compensated by the sheer thrill of driving cars that behave uniquely and realistically. A must-have for all rally fans".

IGN summarized that "Rally Trophy is a superb game that offers an unusual alternative to the more technology packed offerings like McRae and Pro Rally". Several critics compared the game to Grand Prix Legends including Pelit, IGN and GameSpot.

GameSpot presented Rally Trophy with its annual "Best Driving Game on PC" award. The game was a nominee for PC Gamer US's "2002 Best Racing Game" award, which ultimately went to NASCAR Racing 2002 Season.

The game sold over 650.000 copies.
