= XMR =

XMR may refer to:

- Monero, code XMR, a decentralized cryptocurrency
- X Motor Racing, a motor racing game for Windows
- Meroitic language, ISO 639-3 language code XMR
- Cape Canaveral Space Force Station, FAA LID XMR

== See also ==
- Xenotropic murine leukemia virus–related virus (XMRV)
- XM Satellite Radio
