= NASCAR Racing 3 =

1999 video game produced by Papyrus Design Group

- Cover art featuring the cars of Bobby Labonte and Dale Jarrett
- Developer: Papyrus Design Group
- Publisher: Sierra Sports
- Director: David Matson
- Producer: Matt Marsala
- Designer: Richard Yasi
- Programmer: Charlie Heath
- Artist: David D. Flamburis
- Series: NASCAR Racing
- Platform: Microsoft Windows
- Release: NA: September 16, 1999; EU: 1999
- Genre: Sim racing
- Modes: Single-player, Multiplayer

NASCAR Racing 3 is a racing simulator produced by Papyrus Design Group and published by Sierra Sports for Microsoft Windows in 1999.

== Gameplay ==
Players can compete in the 1999 NASCAR Winston Cup Series and the 1999 NASCAR Busch Series. The game had an expansion called Craftsman Truck Series Expansion, featuring content from the 1999 NASCAR Craftsman Truck Series. Patches were available for updates for both the main and expansion games on the Sierra Entertainment website.

A CD-ROM given away as part of 2000 Daytona 500 official program includes a demo of the game (and NASCAR Legends) featuring Daytona International Speedway, which would make its official debut in the sequel, NASCAR Racing 4.

== Development ==
Originally, NASCAR Racing 3 was to feature physics that debuted in Grand Prix Legends and to be released in fourth quarter of 1998, according to the teaser included in the Busch Series expansion pack for NASCAR Racing 2. This version of NASCAR Racing 3 was cancelled in favor of the final version, which was closer to the predecessor, and the Grand Prix Legends-style physics was pushed back to NASCAR Racing 4.

== Reception ==
Reception

Aggregate score
Aggregator	Score
GameRankings	84%

Review scores
Publication	Score
CNET Gamecenter	8/10
Computer Games Strategy Plus	4/5
Computer Gaming World	4/5
GameSpot	9.4/10
GameZone	8.5/10
IGN	9.2/10
PC Accelerator	8/10
PC Gamer (US)	81%
PC PowerPlay	89%
PC Zone	79%

NASCAR Racing 3 received favorable reviews according to the review aggregation website GameRankings.

According to Edge, the game sold at least 100,000 units in the US, but was beaten by NASCAR Racing 4's 260,000 sales in the region. Total US sales of NASCAR Racing computer games released in the 2000s reached 900,000 units by August 2006.

The game won GameSpot's 1999 "Driving Game of the Year" award. The staff called it "as ambitious as driving games get". It was also a nominee for CNET Gamecenter's "Best Racing Game" award, which went to Need for Speed: High Stakes.
