= IndyCar Racing II =

1995 video game

- Developer: Papyrus Design Group
- Publishers: Papyrus Design Group; Sierra On-Line (re-release)
- Producer: Todd Farrington
- Designers: Adam Levesque; Brian C. Mahony; Matt Sentell; Randy Cassidy; David Kaemmer; John Wheeler
- Programmers: Rick Genter; David L. Miller
- Artist: Brian C. Mahony
- Platforms: MS-DOS, Classic Mac OS, Windows
- Release: June 1996
- Genre: Sim racing
- Mode: Single-player

IndyCar Racing II is a sim racing video game developed by Papyrus Design Group and published in 1996 for MS-DOS, Mac, and Windows 95. It is the sequel to IndyCar Racing. The game was re-released by Sierra in 1997, with a few minor upgrades, under the title CART Racing. The name change resulted from the CART series losing licensing rights to the name IndyCar after the Indianapolis Motor Speedway and IRL lockout in 1996.

== Gameplay ==
Cockpit view (SVGA mode)

The game still used many contemporary drivers, chassis (Lola, Reynard, Penske) and engines (Ford-Cosworth, Mercedes-Benz, Honda). 15 circuits were included in this game with Miami (road course) and Indianapolis missing.

== Development ==
This game is based on the 1989 game Indianapolis 500 and on Papyrus' 1993 IndyCar Racing. A demo was released in 1995, and several patches for the MS-DOS and Windows 95 were created after the game's release to improve it. This game can run in SVGA 640 × 480 and includes some other changes in comparison with IndyCar Racing, such as allowing outside cameras by pressing the F10. This is useful on flat courses like the Cleveland airport track.

== Reception ==
Reception

Review score
Publication	Score
PC Games	B

IndyCar Racing II received generally good ratings, such as 7.8 out of 10 by GameSpot, and 4 out of 5 by Computer Games Magazine. Some reviewers commented on the extreme detail and customization of the racecar, and the ability to change any part. GameRevolution remarked: "There are thirteen different customizable characteristics to the car... You could spend an entire week inside the garage just fiddling with the many ways to improve your car's performance". Finally some reviewers commented on the realism of the game, such as GameSpot, who noted: "Even on the easiest of settings, driving an IndyCar is comparable to riding a wild bull".

Computer Games Strategy Plus named IndyCar Racing II the best computer racing simulation of 1995. Likewise, Macworld presented the game with its 1996 "Best Sports Game" award; the magazine's Steven Levy of the magazine wrote that "this champion of race games has just about everything". It was a runner-up for Computer Gaming World's 1995 "Simulation of the Year" award, which ultimately went to EF2000. The editors wrote that IndyCar Racing II "takes the already excellent IndyCar design and adds much-improved driver AI".

IndyCar II, alongside Papyrus's other games under the CART name, achieved combined sales above 800,000 units by January 1998. However, Gord Goble of GameSpot reported that the game itself pulled "less than fantastic sales figures", with 180,000 copies sold by 2004.
