= NFL Pro League Football =

1989 video game

- 1989 cover
- Developer: Micro Sports
- Publishers: Micro Sports; Interplay Entertainment; IBM
- Designer: David Holt
- Platforms: MS-DOS, Classic Mac OS
- Release: 1989–1995
- Genre: Sports
- Modes: Single-player, multiplayer

NFL Pro League Football is a sports video game developed and first published in 1989 by American studio Micro Sports for MS-DOS and Classic Mac OS.

== Gameplay ==
NFL Pro League Football is an American football game that has a statistical model that enables the player to replay entire NFL regular seasons.

== Development and release ==
NFL Pro League Football was developed by David Holt and his company Micro Sports Inc. As a lifelong lover of sports, Holt played football in high school and college and claimed to have once tried out for the Dallas Cowboys and been offered a coaching job for the Chicago Bears. His career in the game industry began with the Macintosh games Mac Pro Football and MSFL Pro League Football, which served as coaching simulations based on sports analytics. This focus was carried over into NFL Pro League Football. Holt found that making a sports game statistically realistic is the most difficult aspect its design. "If the numbers don't match up, then the game play, even though it could be fun, loses that sense of realism," he stated. "If the numbers don't match up, it's not real to me. It's only real if the game plays realistically, and if the play calling is realistic and the numbers match up to the players being simulated."

Micro Sports self-published the game first in 1989 and had updated editions released the next several years. Newer versions were offered at a lower price for customers that already owned a copy. The 1991 and 1992 editions, published by Interplay Entertainment, boasted improved graphics, reworked interfaces, and new features such as modem connectivity for multiplayer and the ability to download weekly NFL stats from the USA Today Sports Center. Micro Sports also sold additional content for the game in the form of stat disks containing teams from the 1960s, 1970s, and 1980s. The final release in 1995 by IBM came on CD-ROM and included every NFL season from 1960 to 1995 covering nearly 1,000 teams and stats for around 40,000 individual players. Micro Sports merged with MicroLeague Multimedia in 1996. Holt later co-founded the website SportSims which used the NFL Pro League Football model for online simulation leagues and began operations in October 2006.

== Reception ==
Reception

Review scores
Publication	Score
Computer Gaming World	3.5/5
Next Generation	3/5
PC Gamer (US)	70%
PC Zone	50/100
PC Entertainment	3.5/5
MacUser	4.5/5
PC Joker	66%

Win Rogers reviewed the game for Computer Gaming World, and stated that "It will keep flawless records for a fantasy league. Those who live and die by statistics in a football simulation could not ask for more."

Next Generation reviewed the PC version of the game, rating it three stars out of five, and stated that "Micro Sports either needs to stay simple or partner up with someone who has more graphic experience."
