= IndyCar Racing =

1993 video game

- Developer: Papyrus Design Group
- Publishers: NA: Papyrus; EU: Virgin Interactive
- Producer: Dan Scherlis
- Designer: David Kaemmer
- Programmer: David Kaemmer
- Artists: Adam Levesque; Doug McCartney; Warren Sze
- Writers: Steve Vandergriff; Jack Zinkan; Bill Tempero
- Composers: Joe McDermott; George Alistair Sanger
- Platform: MS-DOS
- Release: 1993
- Genre: Sim racing
- Modes: Single-player, multiplayer

IndyCar Racing is a sim racing video game by Papyrus Design Group released in 1993 for MS-DOS. Papyrus, consisting of David Kaemmer and Omar Khudari, previously developed Indianapolis 500: The Simulation, released in 1989.

The game was intended as a realistic simulation of IndyCar's 1993 PPG Indy Car World Series. The game featured a selection of the contemporary chassis and engines and eight circuits which could be raced individually or as part of a championship season. Subsequent expansion packs added a further seven tracks and, later, the Indianapolis Motor Speedway.

A sequel was released in 1996: IndyCar Racing II.

== Gameplay ==
Racing scene

The simulation offers the ability to race in single events or a full Championship season (made up of all the tracks installed and available on the player's computer); to take part in associated practice, qualifying and warm-up sessions; to set up and customize the car both on-track and in a dedicated "garage" feature; and to race head-to-head against another player by connecting two computers, either via modems running at least 9600 bit/s or via a null-modem cable attached to the computers' serial ports.

=== Drivers ===
The game featured most drivers and teams of the 1993 season, with the prominent exception of Nigel Mansell. Mario Andretti and Danny Sullivan were included in generic liveries.

The Indianapolis Motor Speedway expansion included a paint shop allowing the user to create liveries.

=== Qualifying ===
There are two main types of qualifying session: For road courses, it featured a ten-minute "open session" where the player can run as many laps as desired; For ovals, only two "flying laps" are run, with the better of the two average speeds counting. The Indianapolis Motor Speedway expansion Four flying laps are run, and the average of the four lap speeds is used to determine grid position.

In all cases, the player starts the qualifying session from the pit lane, and is automatically in last place on the grid for the race. As in the game's predecessor, Indianapolis 500: The Simulation, all of the opposition drivers' qualifying positions are pre-determined, and although some cars may be out on track during the player's qualifying attempt, they will make no further improvements to their respective lap times or speeds. Skipping the qualifying session leaves the player at the back of the grid.

=== Races ===
With the exception of Indianapolis, all races begin with a standing start with cars two abreast on the grid, cars are three abreast at Indianapolis. A "pit board" is shown on screen each time the player crosses the start/finish line.

=== Championship seasons ===
IndyCar Racing allows the player to take part in a full series of race weekends at every track available on the computer, with results from each race counting towards the Championship standings. The game automatically creates a season schedule based on the range of tracks installed.

If there is a tie between two or more cars for the most laps led, the car which finished the race in the highest position is awarded the point. Cars which crash or retire late in a race, and are still in the top 12 at the end, are still classified and awarded the appropriate number of points.

=== Instant replay function ===
IndyCar Racing moved on significantly from the innovative but limited instant replay feature in Indianapolis 500: The Simulation. Whereas the latter offered a re-run of only the last 20 seconds of on-track action, and only from the perspective of either the player's own car or the leader, IndyCar Racing stores around an hour of footage from several different camera angles and for each of the active cars on the track. Retired or crashed cars can no longer be selected for viewing after they are removed from the track. Unlimited numbers of replays could be saved as well.

=== Crashes ===
Any opponent could crash at any point during the race (although subject to various constraints noted below). If the "yellow flags" option is chosen from the "OPTIONS"/"REALISM" menu selection, yellow flags will be waved immediately and a period of driving at reduced speed with no on-track overtaking will commence. Pit-stops can still be made during caution periods, and indeed if a crash occurs close to a standard pit-stop "window", the majority of cars will usually take the opportunity to pit. Likewise, cars can retire due to mechanical failure during a caution period.

Racing under green-flag conditions recommences some laps later (varying from track to track) when the leader enters the home straight. Crashed cars show "Crashed" next to their number and driver name on both the summary and the full standings charts.

== Reception ==
Reception

Review scores
Publication	Score
Hyper	92%
MacUser	3.5 out of 5
Electronic Entertainment	9 out of 10

Shipments of IndyCar Racing to retailers surpassed 400,000 units by 1999. According to Gord Goble of GameSpot, the game's global sales totaled roughly 300,000 units by 2004. He called this performance "a definite step up from 1989's maiden effort and a real feather in the cap".

Computer Gaming World in 1994 called IndyCar Racing "the only current driving sim where 180 mph feels like 180 mph", praising the simulation of drafting, AI drivers' behavior, and accurate depictions of racing tracks, while criticizing the documentation. The magazine concluded that it "is the purest driving game ever let loose on the gaming public".

IndyCar Racing was named Best Sports Program at the 1994 Codie awards. It won Computer Gaming World's Simulation Game of the Year award in June 1994. The editors called the game "the motor sports aficionado's dream come true". IndyCar Racing was a finalist for Electronic Entertainment's 1993 "Best Game" award, which ultimately went to X-Wing. The editors wrote that it "is so realistic, A.J. Foyt could use it to practice".

In 1994 PC Gamer US named IndyCar Racing the 20th best computer game ever. The editors wrote that it "looks great, sounds great, and feels great". That same year, PC Gamer UK named it the 9th best computer game of all time, calling it "clearly the best motorsports game on the PC".
