= NASCAR Racing 2 =

1996 video game developed by Papyrus Design Group

- Cover art featuring the cars of Dale Earnhardt, Terry Labonte, Jeff Gordon, Johnny Benson, and Ricky Rudd
- Developer: Papyrus Design Group
- Publisher: Sierra On-Line
- Producer: Adam Levesque
- Designers: David D. Flamburis; Adam Levesque; Matt Marsala; John Wheeler
- Programmer: John Wheeler
- Artists: Sandro Carella; David D. Flamburis
- Series: NASCAR Racing
- Platforms: Windows, MS-DOS
- Release: December 9, 1996
- Genre: Sim racing

NASCAR Racing 2 is a video game developed by Papyrus Design Group and published by Sierra On-Line for Microsoft Windows and MS-DOS in late 1996. The game had an expansion, called NASCAR Grand National Series, released in late 1997. It is the sequel to NASCAR Racing.

== Gameplay ==
NASCAR Racing 2 improved upon its predecessor by introducing a new game engine. This improved the graphics, physics, sound, and multiplayer.

This game is notable as being the first NASCAR game to have 3D Acceleration: 3Dfx Acceleration through DOS, and Rendition through Windows.

== Reception ==
Like its predecessor, the game was very positively reviewed, scoring an 86% on MobyGames.

In a positive review, GameSpot gave the game a 9.2/10, calling it "a completely professional game, both in its execution and in its dedication to the NASCAR tradition." Likewise, Computer Gaming World gave the game a perfect 100%, saying "be assured that Papyrus/Sierra's NASCAR RACING 2 continues down that near legendary road of glory. Like INDYCAR II, NASCAR 2 is a sequel to what was already an outstanding game. But unlike INDYCAR II, this is a nearly wholly revised exercise – one that'll make it impossible to go back once you've checked it out."

Next Generation was a bit more indifferent towards the game, rating it three stars out of five. Nonetheless, they stated that "as a whole, NASCAR Racing 2 is a solid example of what a racing game should be".

NASCAR Racing 2 won Computer Games Strategy Plus's 1996 "Racing Simulation" of the year award. It was a runner-up for Computer Game Entertainment's 1996 "Best Sports Game" prize, which ultimately went to Links LS 1997. The game was a finalist for Computer Gaming World's 1996 "Sports Game of the Year" award, which ultimately went to NBA Live 97. However, it won the magazine's Readers' Choice award in the category.

NASCAR Racing 2 was named the 42nd best computer game ever by PC Gamer UK in 1997.

NASCAR Racing 2 was a commercial hit. According to PC Data, the game was the United States' 19th-best-selling computer game during the January-November 1998 window. NASCAR Racing 2 and its predecessor shipped above 2 million copies globally by March 1998. According to Gord Goble of GameSpot, the game alone reached global sales of 800,000 units by 2004, making it the second-biggest Papyrus hit as of that year.

== NASCAR Racing Online Series ==
NASCAR Racing 2 and, later, NASCAR Racing: 1999 Edition, were the base games for an online pay-to-play racing service titled NASCAR Racing Online Series (NROS) and hosted by TEN. NROS featured up to 22 drivers per race. The service was announced on December 3, 1996, launched on November 12, 1997, and shut down on October 14, 1999 (due to the release of NASCAR Racing 3 and its support on WON.net).
