= NASCAR Racing 2003 Season =

2003 video game

- Cover art featuring the 2003 cars of 2002 Daytona 500 front row starters Jimmie Johnson and Kevin Harvick
- Developer: Papyrus Design Group (Note: Mac OS X version developed by Westlake Interactive)
- Publisher: Sierra Entertainment (Note: Mac OS X version co-published by Aspyr)
- Platforms: Windows, Mac OS X
- Release: Windows: NA: 11 February 2003; EU: 15 February 2003; AU: 19 February 2003; Mac OS X: NA: 2 April 2003
- Genre: Sim racing
- Modes: Single-player, multiplayer

NASCAR Racing 2003 Season, or NR2003 for short, is a computer racing simulator released in February 2003 by Papyrus Design Group for Windows and Mac OS X. The game was the last to be released by the company before EA Sports bought the NASCAR license exclusively from 2004 to 2009 (parent company Sierra's successor company, Activision Blizzard, reacquired NASCAR rights in 2011, with NASCAR The Game: 2011). The game included all of the 2003 NASCAR season tracks and many of the drivers, including Dave Blaney, who was absent in NASCAR Thunder 2004. In May 2003, Papyrus published a free DLC for the game, containing three fictional tracks.

== Gameplay ==
Cockpit view

NASCAR Racing 2003 Season contains 42 Winston Cup teams that were anticipated to run throughout the season, with the exception of the cars from Chip Ganassi Racing, as well as 23 Winston Cup series tracks, putting the player behind the wheel of a NASCAR stock car. Players are able to choose between testing sessions, offline single racing, championship, and multiplayer options as well as car setup choices. The physics engine was refined and enhanced under consultation with NASCAR team engineers.

== Ownership ==
At the end of March 2004, NR2003 was pulled from shelves when Electronic Arts acquired the exclusive NASCAR rights. In May 2004, Papyrus was shut down, and David Kaemmer bought the source code and assets a couple months later for his company FIRST, LLC where it became the base code for iRacing. In 2007, Sierra, the game's publishers, shut down the online servers.

== Reception ==
Reception

Aggregate score
Aggregator	Score
Metacritic	89/100

Review scores
Publication	Score
Computer Games Magazine	4.5/5
Computer Gaming World	3.5/5
GameSpot	8.8/10
GameSpy	4.5/5
GameZone	9.5/10
IGN	9.3/10
Jeuxvideo.com	16/20
Macworld	(Mac) 4.5/5
PC Gamer (US)	95%
X-Play	4/5

The game received "generally favorable reviews", according to the review aggregation website Metacritic.

According to Edge, the game sold at least 100,000 units in the U.S., but was beaten by NASCAR Racing 4's 260,000 sales in the region. Total US sales of NASCAR Racing computer games released in the 2000s reached 900,000 units by August 2006.

The game won PC Gamer US' 2003 "Best Racing Game" award. The magazine's Andy Mahood wrote that it "established a daunting new standard for PC racing simulations that may take years to eclipse".
