= CART–IRL split =

1996–2008 split in American open-wheel car racing

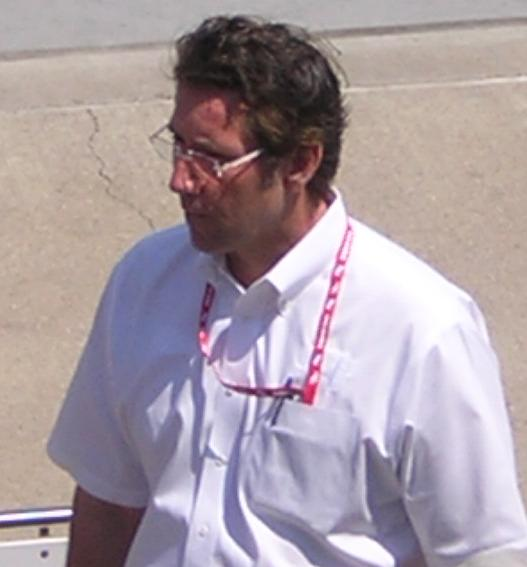
Tony George (pictured in 2007), who founded the Indy Racing League in 1994 and split American open-wheel car racing into two series.

A split between Championship Auto Racing Teams (CART) and the Indy Racing League (IRL), two premier sanctioning bodies in American open-wheel car racing, lasted from 1996 to 2008. Before the split, CART, known as IndyCar from 1992 to 1996, was the sport's premier sanctioning body, although the United States Auto Club (USAC) sanctioned its flagship event, the Indianapolis 500. The split stemmed from ideological differences between CART officials, who prioritized road courses and street circuits, and Indianapolis Motor Speedway (IMS) president Tony George, who preferred oval track racing. The IRL was formed by George in 1994 and debuted in January 1996 as a cheaper, oval-focused alternative to CART in order to allow American drivers who had experience in dirt track racing to race in the Indianapolis 500. For the 1996 edition of the race, George implemented the 25/8 rule which essentially shunned CART teams from competing. CART responded by hosting their own 500 mi (800 km) race on the same day at Michigan International Speedway, named the U.S. 500; however, the race was marred by a major pileup before the start of the race.

Despite the embarrassment of the U.S. 500, CART was still viewed as the more prestigious American open-wheel racing league and initially continued to thrive. In the next few years, however, numerous financial and scheduling missteps led to common infighting and several chief operating officers being ousted. The prestige of the Indianapolis 500 was still too large for teams to overlook, and in 2000, several years after the 25/8 rule had been discontinued, Chip Ganassi Racing became CART's first major team to compete in the race since the split began. The 2001 CART season was particularly disastrous for the series; its first race at Texas Motor Speedway was cancelled because of the dangerously high speeds, and the sudden implementation of a controversial rule regarding turbocharger pop-off valves led two engine manufacturers to leave the series. These incidents also caused a majority of CART's most prominent teams and drivers to defect to the newly renamed IRL IndyCar Series by 2003. In December of that year, CART went bankrupt, and its assets were purchased by a trio of team owners and reorganized into the Champ Car World Series (CCWS) ahead of the 2004 season. The CCWS and IndyCar Series struggled to coexist over the next three years, and members of both series recognized that American open-wheel car racing was at risk of dissipating entirely unless a merger was completed. After years of failed negotiations, Tony George and CCWS co-owner Kevin Kalkhoven announced in February 2008 that the two series had officially merged, with the Toyota Grand Prix of Long Beach in April of that year acting as the finale of the CCWS. The IRL, which rebranded to IndyCar in 2011, was thus left as the sole sanctioning body of the sport.

The split between CART and the IRL disillusioned many fans of American open-wheel car racing and is said to have contributed to the popularity boom of NASCAR in the 1990s and 2000s. Ironically, the modern-day IndyCar Series features a combination of ovals, road courses, and street circuits, but it remains less popular than CART. Tony George, who is no longer involved in the series, has largely been criticized by fans and journalists alike for diminishing the sport's star power, although CART team owners have also been blamed for needlessly prolonging the split.

== Background ==
Disagreements over the sanctioning of American open-wheel car racing originated from the sport's first split. Since 1956, the United States Auto Club (USAC), formed by Indianapolis Motor Speedway (IMS) president Tony Hulman, had sanctioned all top-level American open-wheel races, including the prestigious Indianapolis 500, under their National Championship series. In the 1970s, the series shifted away from dirt track races in favor of road course events, causing several affluent motorsports teams to join the series and drive away independent teams. The series' team owners opposed USAC's management of the sport and felt that they had little-to-no say in improving it. Additionally, the deaths of Hulman in October 1977 and eight USAC officials in April 1978 left the organization in disarray. Famed road racer Dan Gurney wrote a white paper with plans to allow team owners to help govern the sport, but after USAC rejected the idea, Gurney and other team owners formed Championship Auto Racing Teams (CART), which hosted its first race in March 1979.

After a failed attempt to ban CART drivers from the 1979 Indianapolis 500 and a short-lived reunification of the sport in 1980, CART's top division — the Indy Car World Series — became the premier American open-wheel championship circuit, while USAC's National Championship (renamed to the Gold Crown Championship in 1981) only sanctioned the Indianapolis 500. The two leagues reached a truce as the Indianapolis 500 awarded points to drivers in the CART Indy Car World Series championship beginning in 1983, thus providing stability to American open-wheel racing. Through the rest of the 1980s, American open-wheel car racing experienced a rise in popularity, as tickets for the Indianapolis 500 were regularly being sold out months in advance and the average attendance rates for the Indy Car World Series surpassed that of international open-wheel series Formula One (F1) by 1989. The series' popularity grew immensely when then-reigning F1 champion Nigel Mansell joined in 1993, to the point that NASCAR chief executive officer (CEO) Bill France Jr. and Formula One Group CEO Bernie Ecclestone viewed the series as a legitimate threat.

Behind the scenes, however, tensions began brewing with CART and other members of the sport. Andy Kenopensky, the owner of Machinists Union Racing and a member of CART's board of directors, was among the harshest of CART's early critics, believing that wealthy team owners like Penske Racing's Roger Penske were taking advantage of the lack of spending limits and cultivating an economic environment in which poorer teams could not last. After getting kicked out of the board in 1989, Kenopensky wrote a letter which called for a revolt in CART's membership, which ultimately led to John Frasco being ousted from his position as CART's chairman. John Caponigro, the president of CART, had allegedly criticized the Indy Car World Series' title sponsor, PPG Industries, in an annual meeting with CART team owners on October 30, 1989, stating that the company did not support the series' television package or advertise the series in newspapers. Caponigro's contract with CART was resultantly terminated less than two months later, and he was replaced by Johnny Capels. The ten-man board of directors was also dissolved and replaced with a board that included all 24 car owners of the Indy Car World Series.

Tony Hulman's grandson, Tony George, assumed control of the Indianapolis Motor Speedway on January 8, 1990, following the death of Joseph Cloutier the month prior. In October 1990, George conceived a plan to garner further exposure of the Indianapolis 500 by including the race in an international oval-focused series, but it would never be fulfilled as CART feuded with Formula One's sanctioning body Fédération Internationale du Sport Automobile (FISA), which prevented CART from racing in Japan and even threatened to host an oval championship in 1992. George was not told of this championship until the announcement was made and criticized both sanctioning bodies for "not really looking at all the issues."

One of George's top initiatives was to cut costs for American open-wheel racing, as owners struggled to run cars of different specifications for CART races and USAC's Indianapolis 500. Immediately after the 1991 Indianapolis 500, George stated that he and USAC were considering changing the standard specifications to naturally aspirated, 3.5 L (210 in^{3}) engines as soon as 1993, but this rule was never set in motion. It was the same engine size as was common in the Formula One World Championship at the time and proved to costly to run in the World Sportscar Championship, which would have freed up some manufacturer capacity but also have kept costs high for the teams. He then held a meeting with CART officials in Houston, Texas in November 1991 where he laid out his plans to unify CART and USAC under a single American open-wheel racing league, named Indycar Inc. The CART board of directors was to be reduced to 12 members, with George acting as the series CEO and chairman, in order to cut costs. However, William Stokken, CART's new chairman, rejected the idea. George presented an altered version of the plan in a June 1992 board meeting which called for six board members, but it was again turned down by IndyCar, which had rebranded from its original name, CART, four months prior. For the rest of George's time as a non-voting member on the IndyCar board, he was clearly growing displeased with the direction of the sport and even walked out of a meeting in November 1993.

== Formation of Indy Racing League ==
When we had heard in 1994 at Surfers Paradise, for instance, something like [the IRL] would happen, I never thought it was going to come down to that. I always believed that until it happened. And then things just started to deteriorate for the whole sport, really. It was at the time that NASCAR just started to become that 800-pound gorilla.

— 1996 Indy Car World Series champion Jimmy Vasser discussing the split in 2016.

The tension between Tony George and IndyCar finally boiled over when George announced his resignation from the sport's board of directors on January 7, 1994, citing his "continued dissatisfaction with the decision-making process dictated by the organizational structure of CART." George also disliked that sprint and midget car drivers weren't given a chance to race in the Indianapolis 500 because of IndyCar's emphasis on road courses. Andrew Craig was named the new president and CEO of IndyCar that same day. On the weekend of the 1994 Australian FAI Indycar Grand Prix, George confirmed that USAC and the Indianapolis Motor Speedway were in the process of "establishing a schedule and rules for a new series of automobile races which will include the world-famous Indianapolis 500-Mile Race." The series, named the Indy Racing League (IRL), was officially announced on July 8 with a five-member board of directors and sanctioning from USAC. (Note: USAC was later dismissed from sanctioning the series after two consecutive controversies in 1997, during that year's Indianapolis 500 and True Value 500.) It was scheduled to debut in 1996, and the Indianapolis 500 would act as its cornerstone event. Many people involved in the sport initially didn't believe that the series would succeed; Ed Hinton of ESPN believed that the IRL was "mainly a bargaining ploy by George, to bring CART back to its senses from extravagance."

The IRL's engine specifications for 1996 would permit turbocharged engines with 2.2 L (0.58 U.S. gal) of engine displacement, down from the 2.65 L (0.70 U.S. gal) engines used in IndyCar. Beginning in 1997, the series would institute a new 4 L (1.1 U.S. gal) V8 engine formula. In order to limit ever-increasing speeds at IMS, the maximum inches of boost (inHG) for the 1995 Indianapolis 500 was limited to 52 in June, and again to 48 in August before being outright banned in 1996. Roger Penske, whose driver Al Unser Jr. won the 1994 Indianapolis 500 with a Mercedes-Benz-built pushrod engine that used 55 inHG, was outraged by the rule changes and called them "politically motivated." Penske's two entries, driven by former Indianapolis 500 winners Unser Jr. and Emerson Fittipaldi, wound up failing to qualify for the 1995 race. The IRL also allowed IndyCar chassis that were built from 1991 to 1995 for their five races in 1996.

Throughout 1995, George secured race dates for the IRL's inaugural season with Phoenix International Speedway and New Hampshire Motor Speedway, both of which were originally IndyCar tracks, along with two newly built tracks, Walt Disney World Speedway and Las Vegas Motor Speedway. He also reached a one-year contract with ABC Sports to air the 1996 races on live television. Despite Andrew Craig's attempts to negotiate with George in February and March, the animosity between IndyCar and the IRL grew to the point that both traded public insults at each other in interviews. Furthermore, two races on the 1996 PPG Indy Car World Series schedule — the Bosch Spark Plug Grand Prix at Nazareth Speedway and the Texaco/Havoline 200 at Road America — coincided with the IRL's Indianapolis 500 rookie orientations and the True Value 200 at New Hampshire, respectively.

=== Introduction of 25/8 rule ===
On July 3, 1995, the split reached a new climax when IRL director Jack Long announced that 25 of the 33 spots on the starting grids for all future 500 mi (800 km) IRL races would be reserved for the top 25 cars in the owners' standings of the series. Tony George also promised that each race would have a minimum purse of $1,000,000, and all IRL car owners would receive at least $22,000. The rule, commonly referred to as the 25/8 rule, broke a long-standing tradition of allowing the fastest 33 cars to compete in the race so long as they met the legal specifications. Many IndyCar team owners perceived the 25/8 rule as a lock out of the 1996 Indianapolis 500, and Andrew Craig stated that he was discussing the possibility of filing an antitrust litigation lawsuit against Indianapolis Motor Speedway. George, however, denied purposefully locking IndyCar teams out of the Indianapolis 500 and blamed IndyCar for "forcing its members to choose" in an open letter published in October.

On December 18, IndyCar announced that a new 500-mile race, named the U.S. 500, was to be held at Michigan International Speedway (MIS) on May 26, 1996, the same day and the same time as the Indianapolis 500, as a form of boycotting the event. Qualifications for the U.S. 500 would also be held on the same day as Pole Day qualifying for the Indianapolis 500. John Procida, the news manager of IndyCar, proclaimed that it was the "premier event" of the Indy Car World Series. Tony George was displeased with the introduction of the U.S. 500, stating two days after the announcement that it could "diminish the opportunities for some drivers and teams to compete in the greatest motorsport event in the world, the Indianapolis 500." PPG had previously pleaded with IndyCar owners not to host the U.S. 500 because the company, in addition to sponsoring the Indy Car World Series, also issued checks to every qualifier of the Indianapolis 500. Pundits predicted that the boycott could lessen the popularity of American open-wheel racing as a whole.

== Indianapolis 500 vs. U.S. 500 ==
The 1996 IRL season originally featured five races, but George announced in August 1995 that each season of the IRL would conclude with the Indianapolis 500, thus condensing the season to three races. The only IndyCar teams that switched their allegiance to the IRL ahead of the season were Team Menard, A. J. Foyt Racing, Hemelgarn Racing, and Dick Simon Racing. Four-time Indianapolis 500 winner A. J. Foyt, who owned A. J. Foyt Racing, was a major supporter of the IRL and was pleased that American open-wheel racing was returning to traditional oval events. He also initially planned to field cars in the Indy Car World Series, but claimed that other team owners forced him out, so he filed a $15 million antitrust lawsuit against IndyCar on January 17, 1996. The handful of notable drivers who switched to the IRL include 1990 Indianapolis 500 winner Arie Luyendyk and past Indianapolis 500 pole sitters Roberto Guerrero and Scott Brayton.

On January 27, 1996, the IRL officially debuted with the Indy 200 at Walt Disney World Speedway to a sellout crowd of around 51,000 spectators. Most of the cars that competed in the race were unsponsored, and the race was won by the largely unknown Buzz Calkins. Although Tony George expressed pride in the series' first event, public reception was rather poor, with veteran journalist Robin Miller writing that the race had "a big disparity in speed, shallow field and overall uncompetitiveness." The next month, George met with Roger Penske numerous times to try to reach a compromise between IndyCar and the IRL. He sent a memo to IRL teams, stating that the Indianapolis 500 may include up to 42 cars while maintaining the top-25 rule. However, no deal was ever reached, and IndyCar reaffirmed that the U.S. 500 was to be held as planned. Advertisements for the U.S. 500 attempted to build up prominence of IndyCar's drivers, referring to them as the "real stars and cars" of American open-wheel racing. Although broadcast networks CBS and Fox were rumored to air the race, IndyCar ended up striking a deal with cable network ESPN instead. Further tensions followed when in March, IMS informed CART that it had to cease using the "IndyCar" name.

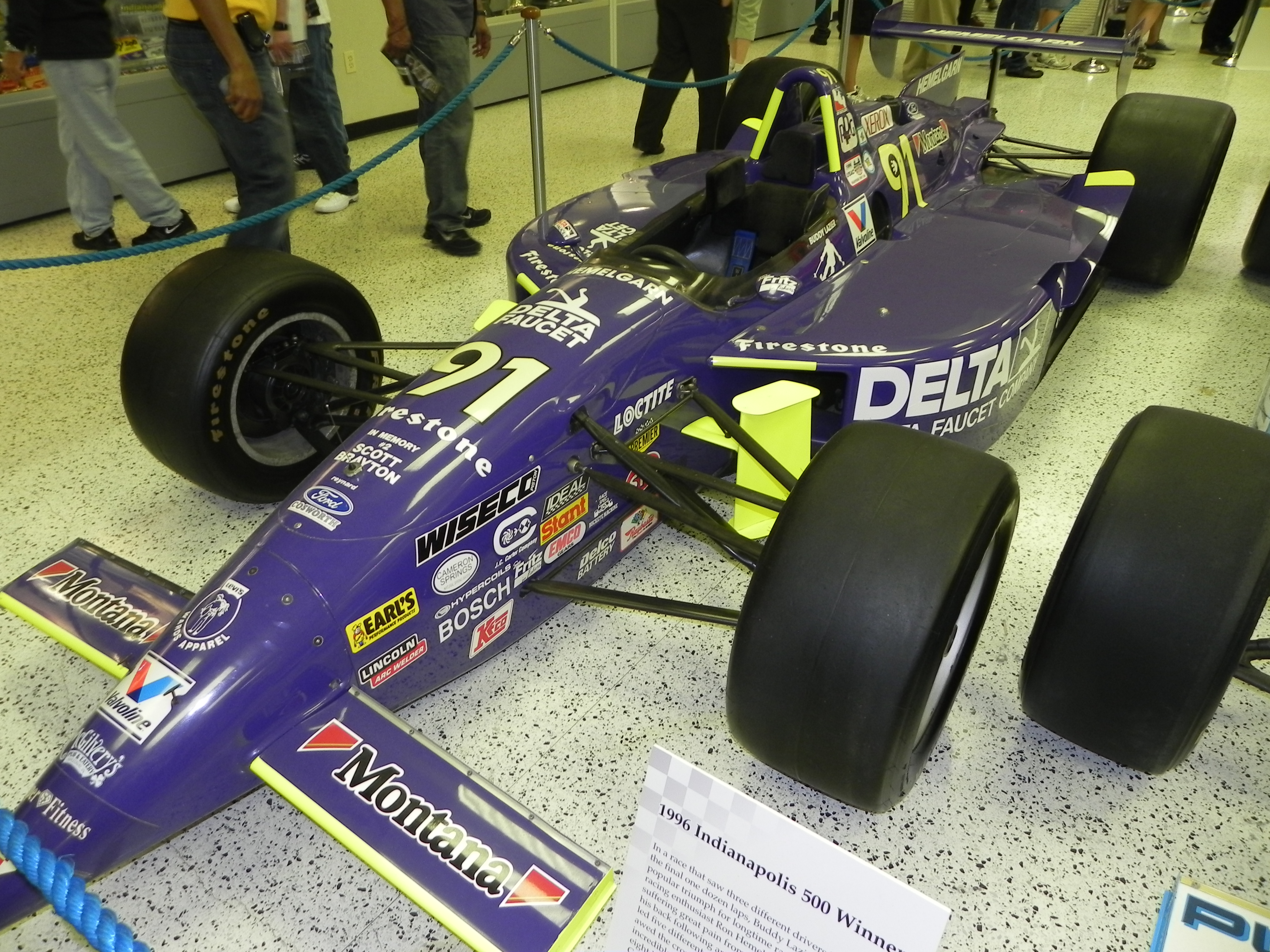
The Reynard 95I (pictured in 2011) which Buddy Lazier drove to win the 1996 Indianapolis 500. Lazier's car was previously owned by Chip Ganassi Racing and driven by Jimmy Vasser in the 1995 Indianapolis 500.

The lead-up to Memorial Day weekend was filled with pessimism and verbal attacks from both series, rather than the usual excitement of the Indianapolis 500. One of the central points of controversy surrounding the Indianapolis 500 was the lack of experience among the majority of its drivers; 17 of the 33 starters were rookies, which was highest amount for the race since 1930. In addition, the turbochargers within the IRL cars produced several track records in the month of May, including the fastest one- and four-lap qualifying speeds and the fastest lap ever recorded at IMS. (Note: All three records were set by Arie Luyendyk and have not been surpassed as of 2026.) It was expected by many, including IndyCar driver Michael Andretti, that these factors would lead to a tragedy in the race. A. J. Foyt responded to these claims fiercely during a press conference after Second Day Qualifying, feeling that IndyCar teams were jealous for being excluded and berating IndyCar for staging the U.S. 500. Tony Stewart, billed as the IRL's "poster boy," said that the "real race car drivers" were participating in the Indianapolis 500.

This boycott continued into 1997, where CART ran a race, the 1997 Motorola 300 at Gateway Motorsports Park in suburban St. Louis, the day before the Indianapolis 500. The IRL withdrew the 25-8 rule after the 1997 Indianapolis 500, but this did not bring back any CART teams for the 1998 Indianapolis 500, with no CART teams entering the Indianapolis 500 until Chip Ganassi Racing entered cars in the 2000 Indianapolis 500. CART teams continued to enter in 2001 (which was co-sanctioned by CART in an failed attempt to get around Team Penske's Tobacco Master Settlement Agreement concerns) and 2002, but 2002 saw a controversy divided into party lines as to whether Hélio Castroneves (driving for Penske, who just fully defected from CART to IRL that year) or Paul Tracy (who drove for the CART side Team Green) was the rightful winner following a late last-lap yellow flag and a pass that preceded it.

== IndyCar trademark dispute ==
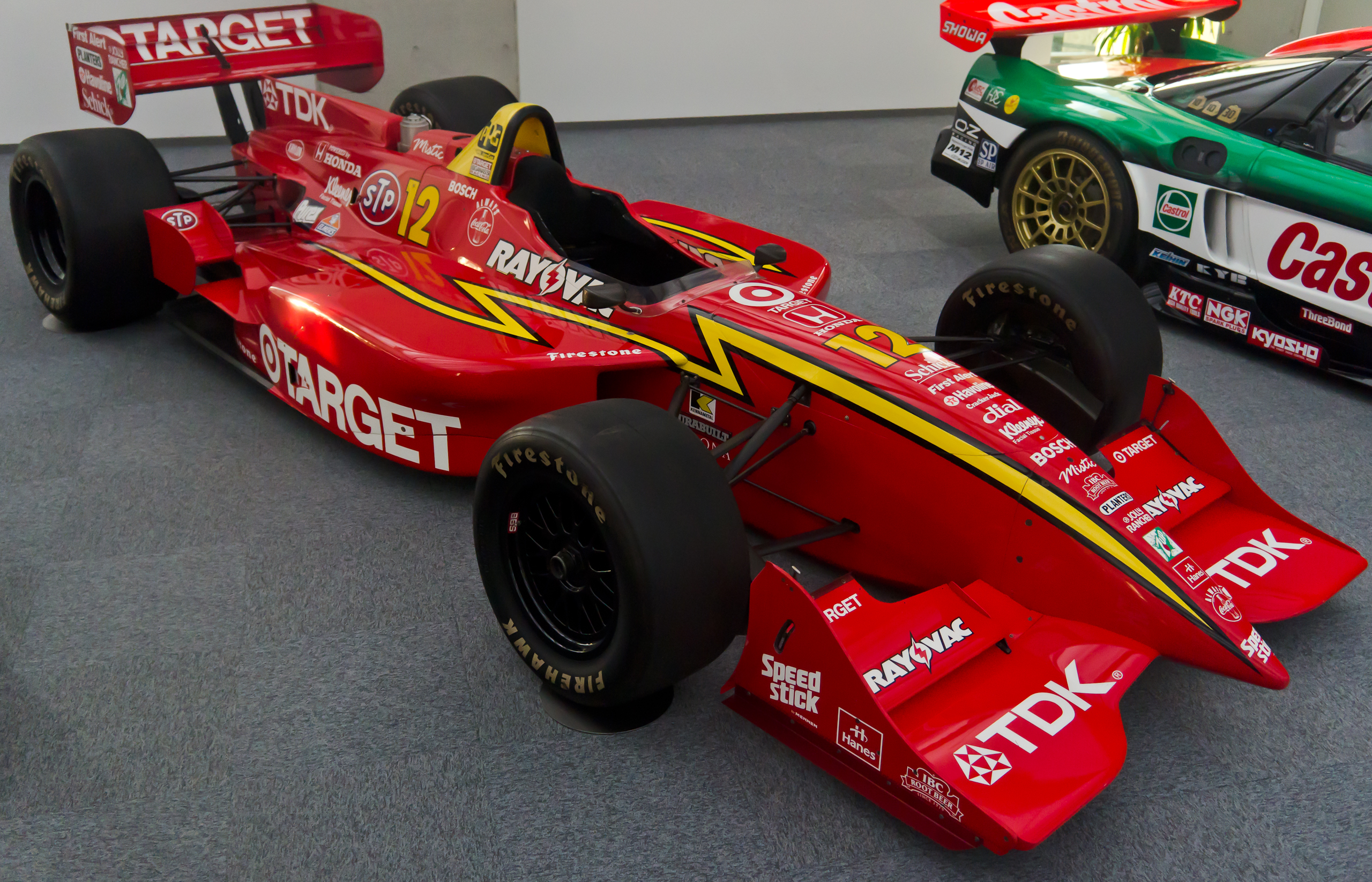
Jimmy Vasser's 1996 CART championship winning car

Although CART never sanctioned the Indianapolis 500, the series they organized had carried the "Indy Car" name since 1979, when it was co-sanctioned by Sports Car Club of America (for ACCUS-FIA recognition purposes). In 1992, during an attempt by CART to broaden their board membership, the Indianapolis Motor Speedway registered the camel case trademark IndyCar with the United States Patent and Trademark Office and licensed it to CART as their new trade name.

After the Indy Racing League kicked off in 1996, early-season tensions between the IRL and CART were heightened even further when IMS sent a letter to Championship Auto Racing Teams, Inc. on March 19, stating that their licensing agreement to the brand name "IndyCar" had been terminated because of their upcoming U.S. 500. In response, CART filed a lawsuit against IMS in the United States District Court for the Eastern District of Michigan on April 1, claiming that the speedway's attempt to rescind the branding was "without merit." On May 6, IMS filed a counter-lawsuit against CART to the United States District Court for the Southern District of Indiana, asserting that the track owns the trademark and would only allow CART to use it on the basis that their IndyCar teams race in the Indianapolis 500.

Eventually a settlement was reached in which CART agreed to give up the use of the "IndyCar" mark following the 1996 season and the IRL agreed not to use the name before the end of the 2002 season. CART returned to branding as simply CART for 1997, with the championship named the "CART World Series" that year and then "CART Championship Series" the following year, and resurrected the term "champ car" to describe their vehicles. Indy Racing League eventually adopted the IndyCar Series name in 2003 when the settlement expired.

Because of the trademark dispute, the video game IndyCar Racing II (released in 1996, when the split was underway) had to be renamed CART Racing when it was re-released in 1997.

== Demise of CART ==
After the Ganassi Racing cars entered in the 2000 Indianapolis 500, Team Penske entered three further cars for the 2001 Indianapolis 500 with 6 total CART drivers – Michael Andretti, Gil de Ferran, Hélio Castroneves, Jimmy Vasser, Bruno Junqueira, and Nicolas Minassian – slated to participate in the race. Following this, for the 2002 Indy Racing League, Team Penske moved to the IRL from CART, citing the Tobacco Master Settlement Agreement. While in 2002, Ganassi Racing had three cars in CART, there was also one entry from the team in the IRL that season, and in September 2002, the team announced they would only run in the 2003 IndyCar Series (renamed from the Indy Racing League) and would not be running any more cars in CART moving forward.

2001 also saw three black marks for CART: the cancellation of Firestone Firehawk 600 at Texas Motor Speedway on the race day due to safety concerns caused by a combination of high banking and high speeds during practice and qualifying, resulting in a black mark for CART, including a lawsuit between CART and track management Speedway Motorsports (it was not the only race cancelled that year; the Rio 200 was pulled off the calendar despite being initially announced as part of it as well); the critical and commercial flop of its tie-in film Driven; and a mishandling of a controversy pertaining to turbocharger pop-off valves that prompted Honda and Toyota to switch to the-renamed IndyCar Series by 2003. CART's woes continued through the 2003 CART season, hitting a nadir with the 2003 Grand Prix of Long Beach having more race-day attendees than television viewers. Furthermore, the aforementioned defection of Honda and Toyota to IndyCar Series left only one engine manufacturer providing engines for CART's 2003 season. Furthermore, two teams made a transition from CART to the IRL for the 2003 season with Andretti Green Racing making a full-time debut with multiple cars. Also, Team Rahal and Fernández Racing both entered one car into CART and one car into IRL for the 2003 season, with both teams having all of their cars in the IRL for the beginning of the 2004 IndyCar season.

== Champ Car World Series and the end of the split ==
The defections of teams and engine manufacturers to the IRL over the prior few years, coupled with financial management issues stemming from an ill-advised initial public offering of stock, caused CART to declare bankruptcy following the 2003 season. While IndyCar (as the IRL renamed itself at that time) bid for CART's assets in bankruptcy court, the court accepted the competing bid of Open Wheel Racing Series LLC, a company organized by CART team owners Gerald Forsythe, Kevin Kalkhoven, and Paul Gentilozzi, which adopted the Champ Car World Series (CCWS) name CART had used for their 2003 series. The CCWS continued to operate separately from IndyCar as a road course-oriented series until after the 2007 season, when an agreement was made to unify the two series. Because the 2008 IndyCar schedule already included a race in Japan the same weekend as the planned Grand Prix of Long Beach, which had emerged as CART/CCWS's premier race, and neither race could be moved, both races were run, with the 2008 Toyota Grand Prix of Long Beach run under CCWS rules and featuring a field consisting of teams that had been part of the CCWS in 2007, serving as a finale to the Champ Car lineage.

== Bibliography ==
- Oreovicz, John (May 2021). Indy Split: The Battle for the Indy 500: The Big Money Battle That Nearly Destroyed Indy Racing. Octane Press. ISBN 9781642340563.
- Whitaker, Sigur E. (October 22, 2015). The Indy Car Wars: The 30-Year Fight for Control of American Open-Wheel Racing. McFarland & Company. ISBN 978-0-7864-9832-1.
- Ferriss, Paul (September 2001). Never Too Fast: The Paul Tracy Story. ECW Press. ISBN 9781550224696.
