= NASCAR Legends =

1999 video game

- Developer: Papyrus Design Group
- Publisher: Sierra Sports
- Series: NASCAR Racing
- Platform: Windows
- Release: NA: November 22, 1999
- Genre: Sim racing
- Modes: Single-player, multiplayer

NASCAR Legends is a NASCAR racing simulator developed by Papyrus Design Group for Windows-based personal computers and released by Sierra On-Line in late 1999. It was based on the 1970 NASCAR Grand National Series (the precursor to the NASCAR Cup Series), and featured drivers, cars, and venues from that year. The game used the same game engine as NASCAR Racing 3. However, the game play reflects the performance of the 1970 race cars.

Players can choose to drive and also customize the four different cars available, with the game choosing the aero version of the car for speedways and road courses, using the base car for the short tracks. The game includes 16 of the 48 real events from the 1970 season, such as Bowman Gray Stadium, North Wilkesboro Speedway and the Riverside Raceway road course.

== Reception ==
The game received very strong reviews when released, with IGN giving it an 8.9, GameSpot a 9/10, amongst other strong reviews.

Reception

Review scores
Publication	Score
GameSpot	9/10
IGN	8.9/10
