= NASCAR Racing 4 =

2001 video game

- Cover art featuring the cars of Jeff Burton, Dale Earnhardt, and John Andretti
- Developer: Papyrus Design Group
- Publisher: Sierra On-Line
- Producer: Scott Stutsman
- Designer: Richard Yasi
- Programmer: David Kaemmer
- Artist: David D. Flamburis
- Series: NASCAR Racing
- Platform: Microsoft Windows
- Release: NA: February 7, 2001; EU: April 6, 2001
- Genre: Sim racing
- Modes: Single-player, multiplayer

NASCAR Racing 4 is a racing simulator produced by Papyrus and released in February 2001.

== Gameplay ==
The game was a huge step forward over its predecessor and addressed many requested features for the game. Namely was the introduction of full 24-bit color, as the previous games had only allowed 256, vastly improved car models and environments and, for the first time, the ability of the car to rotate in three dimensions (i.e. the ability of the car to get airborne and flip). The simulator also continued the increased efforts to reflect the aspects of driving a real car.

This was the first version of the game since NASCAR Racing 2 to have actual car manufacturers represented. Additionally, it was the first version of the game to feature the ability to race a full 43 car field. It was the first installment in the "NASCAR Racing" series to include Daytona International Speedway, and included all 21 tracks that were raced in Winston Cup in 2000. It included 25 of the drivers and teams anticipated to run the 2001 season, including Dale Earnhardt as the game was released 12 days before his fatal crash, as well as 42 fictional drivers and teams, most of which carried fictional sponsors or are sponsored by a Sierra company. The inclusion of Sierra affiliate-sponsored cars was a trend that began as early as NASCAR Racing 1999 Edition, where a fantasy truck driver sponsored by Davidson & Associates is present.

As with previous titles in the series, included are the options of testing, single race weekend, championship, and online multiplayer hosted by Sierra servers or a third-party client. In addition, a more detailed paint shop can be accessed via the opponent manager menu, which allows for custom paint schemes and, for the first time, custom pit crew uniforms, to be imported and exported from the game. A replay viewer is also included so the player can view their saved session replays.

NASCAR Racing 4 was followed by NASCAR Racing 2002 Season.

== Reception ==
Reception

Aggregate score
Aggregator	Score
Metacritic	89/100

Review scores
Publication	Score
Computer Games Strategy Plus	4/5
Computer Gaming World	4.5/5
Game Informer	8/10
Gamekult	5/10
GameSpot	9.1/10
GameZone	9.5/10
IGN	9.2/10
Jeuxvideo.com	14/20
PC Gamer (US)	95%
PC PowerPlay	93%
The Cincinnati Enquirer	4.5/5

The game received "generally favorable reviews", according to the review aggregation website Metacritic.

The game sold 260,000 units in the U.S. and earned $10.4 million by August 2006, after its release in February 2001. It was the country's 76th best-selling computer game between January 2000 and August 2006. Combined sales of all NASCAR Racing computer games released between January 2000 and August 2006 had reached 900,000 in the U.S. by the latter date.

The game was nominated for the "Best Simulation Game" award at Computer Gaming World's 2001 Premier Awards, which went to IL-2 Sturmovik. The staff wrote that the game "continued to make us believe in the complex strategy involved in driving around in circles at 200 mph." The staff of Computer Games Magazine named it the best racing game of 2001 at the 11th Annual Computer Games Awards, and called it "the crown King of racing games." The game won the award for "Best Driving Game" at GameSpot's Best and Worst of 2001 Awards.
