= Ninja Rabbits =

1991 video game

- Amiga cover art
- Developer(s): MicroValue
- Publisher(s): MicroValue
- Platform(s): Commodore 64, Atari ST, Amiga, MS-DOS
- Release: 1991
- Genre(s): Beat 'em up
- Mode(s): Single-player

Ninja Rabbits is video game released in 1991 by MicroValue. The protagonist is an anthropomorphic rabbit with dark brown fur, a stick, and a ninja costume. He has to save a factory from destruction. The game was followed by International Ninja Rabbits.

== Gameplay ==
Level 1: The Countryside (Atari ST)

The protagonist as shown on the title screen

The protagonist has a carrot as a life bar. As he takes damage, his carrot bar gets eaten. When his health bar is empty, he falls to the grounds and loses a life. He starts the game with 3 lives. He can go only to the right but sometimes down into sewers. He can use either his hands, feet, or stick to attack. Enemies include flying dragons, street thugs, other ninja, bears, frogs, and other anthropomorphic animals, one of the enemies resembles Raphael from Teenage Mutant Ninja Turtles, in the second level of the game, one of the enemies resembles Splinter.

== Reception ==
Home of the Underdogs considers Ninja Rabbits to be horrendous due to bad controls, very easy gameplay, drab background palettes, and slow animations.
