= Nomad (video game) =

1993 video game

- Developers: Intense! Interactive; Papyrus Design Group
- Publisher: GameTek
- Producers: Rod Humble (GameTek); Dan Scherlis (Papyrus); Sam Palahnuk (Intense!)
- Designer: Sam Palahnuk
- Programmers: Richard Garcia; Andy Hendrickson; David Kaemmer; Omar H. Khudari
- Artist: Doug McCartney
- Writer: Shannon Donnelly
- Composers: Jim Andron; Jack Levy
- Platform: MS-DOS
- Release: NA: 1993; EU: 1993
- Genre: Space trading and combat
- Mode: Single-player

Nomad is a 1993 space trading and combat game developed by Intense! Interactive and Papyrus Design Group. It was published by GameTek for MS-DOS.

Nomad combines elements of alien diplomacy, trading, exploration, and combat. It has been compared to Starflight and Elite 2.

== Plot ==
The story of Nomad changed between its early design and its ultimate commercial release. Originally, the game was to be titled Space Mountain, and act as a tie-in to the Disneyland roller coaster of the same name. Introductory narration was recorded for the game which described the player's character climbing aboard the model ship at Space Mountain only to discover that it is a real spacecraft. It is then launched unexpectedly into the Earth's orbit with the unwitting protagonist still aboard.

The connection with Disneyland was abandoned for the commercial release of Nomad. The story changed to describe the protagonist as being an agent of a global intelligence organization ("O.E.S.I.") that discovered a crashed alien spacecraft in a snowy region of Earth. They repair and re-launch the craft with the protagonist as its sole crew member.

Once in orbit, the player is met by another ship whose pilot, a llama-like Arden, describes the ongoing galactic war between the Alliance and a race of mechanical beings named the Korok. The player is allowed to choose whether he will actively assist the Alliance, and to what degree. Through conversation with alien beings and exploration of star systems, the player uncovers rumors and legends about an ancient alien race (the "Losten") who were the progenitors of existing sentient species. Some of the facts uncovered by the player can be used to locate a fail-safe device that destroys the Korok's Master Control Robot and restores order to the galaxy.

=== Disney association ===
Although the Disney connection was eliminated, several game elements remain unchanged from the original design. The in-game log is titled "Space Mountain Log", and the design of the player's ship almost exactly mirrors that of the "CMB 2000" model which was part of Disneyland's Space Mountain between its 1977 opening and 2005 remodel.

== Gameplay ==
All gameplay takes place with the player's ship in orbit around one of approximately 270 planets that are available to visit across the galaxy. Activities include general ship functions (engineering upgrades, repairs, navigation, and scanning), conversation with aliens, and combat. Most commands are issued through a menu system with keyboard shortcuts.

When in conversation with an alien, the player may ask questions and receive responses about any planet, item, race, or individual that they have previously encountered. Different alien races will have different information available about certain topics. The player's choice of conversation topics influences the disposition of individual aliens, and other game actions influence the friendliness or animosity between alien races.

Communication screen

Conversation can also lead to trade, with many of the game's items providing some value as ship upgrades, navigational data stores, or historic artifacts that carry important plot information. The player may acquire resources from the surface of planets through the use of labor-bots, which are robotic probes specialized in mining, gas harvesting, agriculture, archaeology, or spycraft. These bots – and various enhancements that increase their efficiency on the surface – are available through trade with aliens.

The ship's main functions (e.g. navigation and scanning) can be improved through the acquisition of upgraded components. For example, upgrading the engine booster will reduce travel time between star systems. Upgraded missile loaders will reduce the time required for weapons lock during a combat sequence.

An in-game posting of missions by the Alliance gives a path the player may follow to advance the plot and earn rewards in the form of tradable items.

== Release ==
Nomad operates only in Mode 13h (320x200 256-color VGA). Some preliminary support was added for a 16-color EGA compatible mode at the same resolution, but the finished game did not provide any option to use this mode. The combat engine itself is simplistic, only allowing the player freedom of movement in a 2D plane despite the game using polygon rendering in 3D space.

The performance characteristics of the game's items and equipment are stored in a series of structured data tables. These – and the game's graphics and sound data – are LZSS compressed and packed into a series of archive files.

Sound was made available through Sound Blaster and Disney Sound Source support. There is no synthesized music; the only audio produced by the game is stored as 4-bit DPCM data.

== Releases ==
Nomad was released in late 1993, with a patched bugfix release (v1.01) appearing in February of the following year. It was originally available only on 3.5" floppy disk. When a CD-ROM release was made available in 1994, it included a short pre-rendered cinematic introduction, but the game's content was unchanged from the 3.5" disk release.

== Reception ==
Reception

Review score
Publication	Score
Power Unlimited	91%

Computer Gaming World stated that Nomad "is well balanced between allowing freedom of choice and imparting a feeling of progression toward the conclusion", and approved of its interface and multiple ways of solving the game. The reviewer stated that the game "came dangerously close to" imitating Starflight instead of being an homage, but "comes up short" compared to Wing Commander: Privateer and Elite 2: "It simply isn't as large, doesn't pay off in as many hours of play, and doesn't have the same detailed atmosphere and scope". He recommended Nomad to casual gamers "who actually work for a living and game 'on the side'". PC Player cited the game's simplicity as a positive attribute, while PC Joker was critical of its outdated graphics and repetitive gameplay. Power Unlimited gave a score of 91% summarizing: "A fantastic mix between adventure, strategy, sim, action and mystery. The story only becomes clear while playing.
