= NASCAR Racing 2002 Season =

2002 video game

- Cover art featuring the cars of Kevin Harvick, Terry Labonte, Dale Jarrett, Ward Burton, and Jeff Burton
- Developer: Papyrus Design Group (Note: Mac OS X version ported by Westlake Interactive.)
- Publisher: Sierra Entertainment (Note: Mac OS X version co-published by Aspyr.)
- Platforms: Windows, Mac OS X
- Release: Windows: NA: February 13, 2002; EU: March 15, 2002; Mac OS X: NA: January 2, 2003
- Genre: Sim racing
- Modes: Single-player, multiplayer

NASCAR Racing 2002 Season is the successor to NASCAR Racing 4, released in 2002. The game utilizes the physics engine used in NASCAR Racing 4.

== Reception ==
Reception

Aggregate score
Aggregator	Score
Metacritic	89/100

Review scores
Publication	Score
Computer Gaming World	4/5
GameSpot	8.8/10
GameSpy	5/5
GameZone	9.3/10
IGN	8.9/10
PC Gamer (US)	93%
PC Zone	70%

The game received "generally favorable reviews", according to the review aggregation website Metacritic.

Macworld editor Peter Cohen gave the Mac OS X port a positive review, describing it as a "great auto-racing game for the Mac".

According to Edge, the game sold at least 100,000 copies in the United States, but was beaten by NASCAR Racing 4's 260,000 sales in the region. Total US sales of NASCAR Racing computer games released in the 2000s reached 900,000 copies by August 2006.

The game won the award for "2002 Best Racing Game" at the 9th Annual PC Gamer Awards. It was placed second for GameSpot's February 2002 "Game of the Month" award. The staff called it "one of the best racing experiences in any computer game to date". It was also a runner-up for GameSpot's annual "Best Driving Game on PC" award, losing to Rally Trophy.
