= NASCAR Racing (video game) =

1994 racing video game

- Cover art with the cars of Jeff Gordon and Sterling Marlin
- Developer: Papyrus Design Group
- Publishers: Virgin Interactive (DOS); Sierra On-Line (Mac & PS1)
- Producer: Adam Levesque
- Designers: David Kaemmer; Adam Levesque; John Wheeler
- Programmer: John Wheeler
- Artist: Sandro Carella
- Series: NASCAR Racing
- Platforms: MS-DOS, Classic Mac OS, PlayStation
- Release: MS-DOS; 1994; Classic Mac OS; November 2, 1996; PlayStation; 1996
- Genre: Sim racing
- Modes: Single-player, multiplayer

NASCAR Racing is a racing simulation video game developed by Papyrus Design Group and published in 1994 by Virgin for MS-DOS followed by a Mac port on November 2, 1996. A PlayStation version was also released in 1996 by Sierra On-Line. A sequel, NASCAR Racing 2, was released in 1996.

== Gameplay & Development ==
NASCAR Racing was released on November 2nd, 1994 for MS-DOS compatible operating systems. It includes more than 25 of the 40 regular drivers in the 1994 NASCAR Winston Cup season. Notable absences include Dale Earnhardt (who would go on to win the Winston Cup that year), Dale Jarrett, Kyle Petty and Darrell Waltrip, although the latter's brother, Michael, is present. The PlayStation version includes 20 of the 39 regular drivers from the 1996 season.

Cockpit view (MS-DOS)

The game allows the player to race with up to 38 other cars (32 on shorter tracks such as Bristol and Martinsville) and it also includes multiplayer with direct links (one computer connected to another via a LAN) as well as through an online system owned by Papyrus called Hawaii.

The CD-ROM version supports a SVGA graphics accessible through the command prompt (by entering "nascar -h"), but it was too demanding for many of the computers of its age. Hardware accelerated versions were later created and bundled with the Matrox Millennium and Diamond Edge 3D.

Papyrus produced a Daytona track for exclusive use at a fan simulation game at the Daytona USA museum. In the PlayStation edition, the player races as a rookie in the number 96 Papyrus car.

In an interview, Papyrus staff remarked that they felt the "Mac was a pretty good platform for games in general", praising the hardware for being "integrated right out of the box" and not having to "worry about sound cards, video cards, compatibility problems". Classic Mac OS was described as a "limiting factor" in the development of the game due to the operating system being "pervasive" compared to MS-DOS.

== Reception ==
=== MS-DOS and Macintosh versions ===
Reception

Review scores
| Publication | Score |
|---|---|
| Computer Gaming World | 5/5(MS-DOS) |
| Next Generation | 4/5(MS-DOS) |
| AllGame | 4/5(Mac) |
| MacUser | 3.5/5(Mac) |
| MacHome Journal | 4/5 |

NASCAR Racing was a major commercial success. Its sales reached 350,000 units by December 1995, following its November 1994 release, and rose to 400,000 copies by February 1996. In the United States, NASCAR Racing (bundled with its Track Pack add-on) was the 24th best-selling computer game of 1998 with another 225,737 units sold. Its revenue in that year was estimated at $2.28 million. NASCAR Racing and its sequel shipped above 2 million copies globally by March 1998, and shipments of the first game alone surpassed 1 million units by 2004.

Next Generation reviewed the PC version and said "it's the game's astounding ability to create a realistic feeling of speed that makes it an incredible hit. Flying around the tracks at 170 mph and up will make you respect those drivers who do this for a living. Definitely a winner."

Declaring it "the best racing game ever created", the editors of PC Gamer US presented NASCAR Racing with their 1994 "Best Sports Game" award, and nominated it in their "Best Simulation" category. It also won Computer Gaming World's 1994 "Simulation Game of the Year" award, tying with Aces of the Deep, and was a nominee for the magazine's overall "Game of the Year" prize. The editors opined that its "incredible graphics, sound and overall experience appeal to simulation enthusiasts and casual sports fans alike".

AllGame editor Lisa Karen Savignano gave the Classic Mac OS port a positive review, noting "though complicated to learn, (the) game brings lots of enjoyment to racing fans".

In 1996, Computer Gaming World declared NASCAR Racing the 31st-best computer game ever released.

=== PlayStation version ===
Reception

Review scores
| Publication | Score |
|---|---|
| Electronic Gaming Monthly | 6.9/10 (PS) |
| GameSpot | 8.1/10 (PS) |
| Next Generation | 2/5 (PS) |

The PlayStation port divided reviewers. Next Generation commented that "NASCAR Racing is for the die-hard stock car racing fan who loves NASCAR so much they don't care what kind of package it comes in." They cited dull visuals, the lack of a multiplayer mode, and inadequate attempts at realism. In contrast, Jeff Kitts of GameSpot hailed it as "stock car racing at its most realistic", praising the authentic recreation of real life tracks, abundant options, precise controls, and the accuracy of the PlayStation conversion. The two sports reviewers of Electronic Gaming Monthly held more of a middle ground position. Dindo Perez said that the PC version was a great title, but had been surpassed in the years it took the game to reach the PlayStation, while Todd Mowatt remarked that "this game won't win the checkered flag this time around, but it won't run out of gas on you either." They both commented that the frame rate and general excitement of the game were lacking. GamePro's Dr. Zombie noted the realistic touches to the game and the merely adequate graphics, controls, and sounds, and concluded that "this game will appeal more to diehard racing aficionados than to the casual gamer cruising for speed and action."
