= NASCAR Racing 1999 Edition =

1998 racing video game

- Developer(s): Papyrus Design Group
- Publisher(s): Sierra Sports
- Series: NASCAR Racing
- Platform(s): Windows
- Release: NA: December 1998; EU: 1999
- Genre(s): Sim racing
- Mode(s): Single-player, multiplayer

NASCAR Racing: 1999 Edition is a racing simulator developed by Papyrus Design Group and published by Sierra On-Line in 1998 for Windows. Players can race in all three premier NASCAR series (NASCAR Winston Cup Series, NASCAR Busch Series, and NASCAR Craftsman Truck Series). There is a maximum of 39 cars to race in each series.

NASCAR Racing: 1999 Edition follows NASCAR Racing 2 and is followed by NASCAR Racing 3.

== Reception ==
Reception

Review scores
Publication	Score
CNET Gamecenter	7/10
GameRevolution	C
GameStar	79%
PC Accelerator	4/10
PC Games (DE)	68%

The game received mixed reviews from critics. Gordon Goble of Gamecenter identified it as "essentially a reworked NASCAR 2." Calvin Hubble of GameRevolution said it suffered from a "seriously outdated 3D engine."
