= MSFL Pro League Football =

1988 video game

- Publisher: Micro Sports, Inc
- Release: 1988
- Genre: Sports

MSFL Pro League Football is a 1988 video game published by Micro Sports, Inc.

== Gameplay ==
MSFL Pro League Football is a game in which players can create and run American football leagues using past, present or fictitious teams.

== Development ==
Micro Sports spent $75,000 developing and marketing the game.

== Reception ==
James D. Hornfischer reviewed the game for Computer Gaming World, and stated that "Once players look past the cosmetic flaws (the opening graphics fly by unreadably) and master the quirky interface, MSFL has a magic of its own."
