= NBA Live 97 =

1996 video game

- North American PlayStation box art, featuring Mitch Richmond
- Developer: EA Canada (Note: Credited as Hitmen Productions; the Super NES and Genesis versions were co-developed by NuFX, while the Saturn version was developed by Realtime Associates.)
- Publisher: EA Sports
- Composers: Brian L. Schmidt; Traz Damji (Saturn, DOS)
- Series: NBA Live
- Engine: Virtual Stadium
- Platforms: Sega Genesis/Mega Drive, PlayStation, Super NES, MS-DOS, Sega Saturn
- Release: November 1996: Genesis/Mega Drive; NA: November 1996; EU: 1996 PlayStation; NA: November 26, 1996; EU: December 1996; JP: February 28, 1997 Super NES; NA: December 1996; EU: 1996 MS-DOS; NA: December 1996 Saturn; NA: March 28, 1997; EU: April 4, 1997
- Genre: Sports (basketball)
- Modes: Single-player, multiplayer

NBA Live 97 is the third installment of the NBA Live video game series by EA Sports, released in 1996. The MS-DOS, Sega Saturn, and PlayStation versions featured polygonal models for the on-court players, thus marking it as the first 3D EA Sports basketball sequel for the series. It was also the first NBA Live title released for the Saturn. The game received mostly positive reviews for its advanced graphics and wide array of available moves and plays, though the Saturn conversion was reviled for numerous technical deficiencies. NBA Live 97 was followed by NBA Live 98 in 1997.

== Development ==
The player animations were all created using motion capture. Sacramento Kings players Mitch Richmond and Tyus Edney were among the motion capture actors. Audio commentary was provided by Al Murdoch and Ernie Johnson Jr.

Producer Tarrnie Williams Jr. (son of Tarrnie Williams Sr.) explained the decision to have the series switch from using sprites to polygonal models for the players:

With sprites, you're limited to prerendered animations, right? You're limited to the number of directions you choose, the number of frames you have for each animation, and, of course, because you're limited to the amount of RAM you have on the system, you're not really able to do all the things you want. Now, when you move on to the rendered-on-the-fly guys, once you put the models in, you then have to apply the motion data to them. Now, again, you're limited to the set of motion data you can have; but, first of all, they run at 30 frames per second. Second, you're not limited to eight directions. You have infinite directions; they can point in any direction. Plus, it's enabled us to make our cameras freer. We've got an overhead camera for some of our replay stuff that looks straight down. With sprites, if you look straight down at them, it's like looking straight down at a piece of paper.

== Reception ==
Reception

Aggregate score
| Aggregator | Score |
|---|---|
| GameRankings | 85% (PS1); 83% (PC) |

Review scores
| Publication | Score |
|---|---|
| AllGame | 3.5/5 (PS1) |
| Electronic Gaming Monthly | 8.75/10 (PS1); 4.5/10 (SAT) |
| GameSpot | 8.2/10 (PS1) |
| Next Generation | 2/5 (PS1) |
| Saturn Power | 60/100 (SAT) |
| Sega Saturn Magazine | 67% (SAT) |

Most reviews for the original release on PlayStation were highly positive. Critics praised the dramatic improvement in graphics and animation over the previous installment, the large number of options, the exhaustive playbook, and the custom jerseys created through the create-a-player feature. A reviewer for Next Generation mentioned most of these merits but was a dissenting voice against the game, commenting that "The super-slow gameplay just accentuates the basic flaws in a dying engine that desperately needs to be revamped. ... If you can get past the poor control and slow play, NBA Live '97 is extremely deep and beautiful to watch. Unfortunately, it's just not fun like it used to be." On the other side, Joe Rybicki of Electronic Gaming Monthly called it "a great game that will excite NBA Live fans", Tom Ham of GameSpot said "Boasting lightning-fast gameplay, tons of moves, great artificial intelligence, textured polygon players, and motion capture animation, NBA Live 97 may very well be the best Playstation-based basketball game to date", and GamePro gave it a perfect 5 out of 5 in all four categories (graphics, sound, control, and funfactor), concluding that "you won't find a more complete, dynamic, and in-your-face basketball game on the 32-bit market than Live '97."

GamePro gave similar praises to the Genesis version, calling it "the quintessential basketball title on the Genesis." A different GamePro critic reviewed the Super NES version in the same issue. While he gave it slightly lower scores than the Genesis version in sound, control, and funfactor, his review was relentlessly positive and similarly called it "the best SNES b-ball action ever."

NBA Live 97 was a finalist for the Computer Game Developers Conference's 1996 "Best Sports Game" Spotlight Award, but it lost the award to NHL 97. It was also nominated as Computer Games Strategy Plus's 1996 sports game of the year, although it lost to Links LS.

The later Saturn version was much less well received. Critics still praised the wide range of options and features, but reported the graphics and frame rate are greatly inferior to the PlayStation version's, to the point where it is sometimes difficult to follow the action. GamePro maintained that "the addictive gameplay makes up for any lack of detail in Live '97's overall look." While acknowledging that the core gameplay is good, Rich Leadbetter of Sega Saturn Magazine felt that the issues with the animation, and additionally the speed decrease resulting from poor PAL conversion and the load times when accessing and closing menus, cut into the enjoyment too much. Dean Mortlock devoted most of his review in Saturn Power to arguing that it is ludicrous to release a basketball video game in the United Kingdom since the sport has very little following in that country. The Sega Saturn version of NBA Live 97 ranked ninth on an American video game sales chart published in the May 1997 issue of Swedish magazine Super Play.

In 1997, Electronic Gaming Monthly ranked the PlayStation version the 33rd best console video game of all time, commenting that "No other basketball game comes close in playability and realism." They noted the omission of the Saturn version from the ranking as deliberate, since it "isn't nearly as good."
