= Indianapolis 500: The Simulation =

1989 video game

- Developer: Papyrus Design Group
- Publisher: Electronic Arts
- Producer: Richard Hilleman
- Designer: David Kaemmer
- Programmers: David Kaemmer; Scott Cronce; Richard Garcia
- Artists: Nancy L. Fong; Wilfredo J. Aguilar
- Composer: Rob Hubbard
- Platforms: MS-DOS, Amiga
- Release: 1989: MS-DOS; 1990: Amiga
- Genre: Sim racing
- Mode: Single-player

Indianapolis 500: The Simulation is a racing video game developed by Papyrus Design Group and published in 1989 for MS-DOS. An Amiga version followed in 1990. It was the first game developed by the organisation that would later become iRacing.

The game attempts to be a full simulation of the Indianapolis 500 race. Races are from a first-person perspective. There is a replay mode which uses different camera angles. Indy 500 allows realistically setting-up the car, which affects how it handles. The field and qualifying order are true to the 1989 Indianapolis 500 starting grid, with one exception: the player's car, numbered 17, replaces Car #29 of Rich Vogler, who qualified in 33rd and last place.

== Gameplay ==
Driving a Penske-Chevrolet car in a 60 lap race

There are four race options:

- 10 laps (no damage, no yellow flags)
- 30 laps (no damage)
- 60 laps
- 200 laps

There are also practice and qualifying settings. Practice enables car setups to be altered and tested in real time. Choosing not to participate in the qualifying session results in one starting at the back of the field. The qualifying session requires four laps to be completed, with the mean value of the four lap times determining the qualifying position. No car damage can occur during a Practice session, although other cars may be present on the track and their wreckage remains on the track if the player's car collides with them at any point. Car damage can occur during qualifying sessions.

The available cars are a yellow Penske-Chevrolet, a red Lola-Buick, or a blue March-Cosworth, with the Penske having the fastest default setup (but if one sets the car up well, any of the above racecars can compete effectively). Various settings can be changed during Practice from menus associated with Function keys F3–F10. One's own car is always numbered 17.

Indy 500's theme music was produced by Rob Hubbard, who at the time was new to Electronic Arts as a music director.

=== Car setup ===
A wide and realistic variety of car settings can be altered during Practice in order to change car performance. In Practice mode, changes take immediate effect, making comparisons between even the slightest changes straightforward, and any number of "testing" laps can be driven (all of which are timed, again helping comparisons to be made). During Qualifying and Race sessions, all settings except Turboboost and the anti-roll bars can only be altered during a pit stop, and some settings are unchangeable even then.

=== Replay mode ===
Six camera angles are available: In-Car, Behind, Track, TV, Sky and Leader/Crash. The replay mode offers the chance to review the previous 20 seconds of racing. If an accident occurs, the Leader/Crash camera shows the crashed car. Leader/Crash camera is not available during practice and qualifying.

=== Crashes and retirements ===
The 32 computer-controlled cars can crash at any point in the race, or retire with mechanical problems during pit stops. In a 10-lap race, a crash causes a yellow flag to flash briefly in the top left of the screen, but all cars continue racing at full speed as if still under "green-flag" conditions. In all other race distances, yellow flags flash, cars slow down and are forbidden from passing until the incident is cleared. A crashed car typically stays on the circuit for 2–3 laps before being cleared, after which green flags flash as the leader exits turn 4, signaling that cars may continue racing. No yellow flags are shown if one's own car crashes, unless other cars hit the wreckage. During a yellow flag period, speeds are restricted to approximately 90 mph (against a typical race pace of up to 230 mph).

The player's car cannot be damaged by crashes in 10-lap or 30-lap races. In the longer races, excessively hard contact with a wall, fence or another car can cause wheel and/or engine damage. It is still possible to recover to the pits after damaging one front wheel, though the car is more difficult to control. Destruction of any two tires makes recovery extremely difficult, and in most cases impossible. A very large impact, especially to the rear of the car, may cause engine damage, from which there is no recovery. After being involved in a crash, computer-controlled cars are shown as "Crashed" in the Standings screen.

Retirements may also occur due to mechanical problems. If a car suffers mechanical problems, it will pull into the pits and remain there for the rest of the race. The problem that caused the car to retire is shown on the standings screen. Possible causes of retirement are: Bearing, Clutch, CV Joint, Engine, Gearbox, Ignition, Stalled, Valve, Vibration, Radiator and Oil Leak. Again, this only applies to computer-controlled cars; the player-controlled car does not suffer from random failures.

There is the ability to blow the engine if it goes too high in revs.

=== Finishing a race ===
One of the three end-sequence images after winning a race. The final standings show the player's Lola-Buick (#17) to have finished first.

After finishing, the top display ribbon will show the player's finishing position. If the player has been lapped during the race, this will also be shown. If the player has won the race, a brief end sequence of three images of the celebration will be displayed before returning to the menu.

== Amiga version ==
An Amiga version of Indy 500 was released in late 1990. It ran from a single floppy disk, and was copy-protected using a simple manual-based question-and-answer method common with many other games of the period.

The game was identical to the MS-DOS version except in minor details. For example, an error in programming resulted in there being two cars numbered 20; in the MS-DOS version, one of these was numbered 12, correctly reflecting the 1989 Indianapolis 500 grid. Certain minor bugs were removed.

One instant replay could be saved to disk, as could up to three car settings. However, partly completed races could not be saved. Car control was via mouse, joystick or keyboard; mouse gave a particularly smooth, natural driving feel, and mouse sensitivity could be customized from the main menu.

Replays were only available to those with the optional 512KB ram upgrade installed (normally, Commodore's own "A501").

== Development ==
The game was developed in 18 months with a budget of $70,000

== Reception ==
The game sold more than 200,000 units by 1994.

Auto racer Barry Werger praised the game's graphics, controls, and realism in Computer Gaming World. He described it as a "hyper-realistic simulation [and] a valuable educational tool", and advised casual racers uninterested in running many laps to test each change to the racecar's design to "stick to Out Run". The Amiga version was voted the 9th best game of all time in Amiga Power.

In 1994, PC Gamer UK named Indianapolis 500 the 38th best computer game of all time. The editors called it "pure racing action at its best". In 1996, Computer Gaming World declared Indianapolis 500 the 122nd-best computer game ever released.
