= X Motor Racing =

X-Motor Racing
- Developer(s): Exotypos
- Publisher(s): Exotypos
- Platform(s): Microsoft Windows
- Release: December 30, 2013
- Genre(s): Sim racing
- Mode(s): Single-player, multiplayer

X-Motor Racing (XMR) is a motor racing game developed by the independent studio Exotypos in Russia and released in 2007.

== Reception ==
The game is only available from the developers' website and is not published or distributed through other channels. It has not been reviewed formally by publications and therefore has no Metacritic rating. A YouTube review from sim racing personality Jimmy Broadbent refers to the game as "The World's Worst Racing Simulator", citing its inconsistent handling model and lack of features compared to its contemporaries.
