= Papyrus Design Group =

Video game developer

- Industry: Video games
- Founded: 1987
- Founder: David Kaemmer; Omar Khudari
- Defunct: 2004
- Fate: Sold to FIRST.net
- Headquarters: Watertown, Massachusetts, United States
- Key people: Omar Khudari (CEO)
- Products: Indianapolis 500; IndyCar Racing series NASCAR Racing series Grand Prix Legends
- Parent: Sierra Entertainment (1995–2004)

Papyrus Design Group, Inc. was a video game developer founded in 1987 by David Kaemmer and CEO Omar Khudari. Based in Watertown, Massachusetts, it is best known for its series of realistic sim racing games based on the NASCAR and IndyCar leagues, as well as the unique Grand Prix Legends. Papyrus was acquired by Sierra On-Line in late 1995 and Omar Khudari left Papyrus soon after that. Dave Kaemmer left Papyrus in late 2002, just before the release of NASCAR Racing 2003 Season (NR2003).

In the 2001 Pop Secret 400 at North Carolina Speedway, Papyrus Design Group sponsored John Andretti’s car.

On June 5, 2003, NR2003 community modders PWF (Project Wildfire) announced that many of their members would be joining a new group called FIRST.

At the end of the first quarter of 2004, NR2003 was pulled from the shelves due to license expiration. This is when FIRST (later to become iRacing) started its acquisition of the NR2003 code from Vivendi Universal.

The Papyrus website was shut down on April 5, 2004.

On May 28, 2004, Vivendi and Papyrus sold copyrights to FIRST.net, LLC who became the registered owner of the copyrights for NASCAR Racing 2003 Season and would go on to develop iRacing using its engine.

== Games developed by Papyrus ==
- Indianapolis 500: The Simulation (1989)
- J. R. R. Tolkien's Riders of Rohan (1991) (co-developed with Beam Software)
- IndyCar Racing (1993)
- Nomad (1993)
- NASCAR Racing (1994)
  - NASCAR Racing for the Sony PlayStation (1996)
- Links: The Challenge of Golf (1994) (Sega CD version)
- IndyCar Racing II (1995)
- NASCAR Racing 2 (1996)
  - NASCAR Racing: Grand National Series Expansion Pack (1997)
- Road Rash (1996) (Windows version)
- SODA Off-Road Racing (1997)
- Grand Prix Legends (1998)
- NASCAR Racing 1999 Edition (1999)
  - NASCAR Craftsman Truck Series Racing (1999)
- NASCAR Racing 3 (1999)
  - NASCAR Racing 3: Craftsman Truck Series Expansion Pack
- NASCAR Legends (1999)
- NASCAR Racing 4 (2001)
- NASCAR Racing 2002 Season (2002)
- NASCAR Racing 2003 Season (2003)
- NASCAR Racing 5 (2003) (scrapped Xbox game)
- The Simpsons (2004) (game pitched for the Xbox)

== See also ==
- iRacing, a racing simulator developed by David Kaemmer
