= Grand Prix Legends =

1998 video game

- North American boxart
- Developer: Papyrus Design Group
- Publisher: Sierra Sports
- Director: Matt Sentell
- Designers: Randy Cassidy; David Kaemmer; Brian C. Mahony; Matt Sentell; Richard Yasi
- Platform: Windows
- Release: NA: October 5, 1998; EU: 1998
- Genre: Racing simulation
- Modes: Single-player, multiplayer

Grand Prix Legends is a computer racing simulator developed by Papyrus Design Group and published in 1998 by Sierra On-Line under the Sierra Sports banner. It is inspired by the 1967 Formula One season and includes the teams Brabham, BRM, Eagle, Ferrari and Lotus. Two fictional teams called "Murasama" and "Coventry" replaced Honda and Cooper within the game.

== Gameplay ==
Replay mode (cockpit view)

The game offers several modes in which the player can race alone or against computer generated opponents. The game also features multiplayer via LAN. Many parameters affecting the skill and aggressiveness of the NPC drivers can be specified.

== Teams and drivers ==
GBR Brabham Racing Organisation

- #1 AUS Jack Brabham
- #2 NZL Denis Hulme

GBR British Racing Motors

- #13 GBR Chris Irwin
- #8 FRA Jean-Pierre Beltoise

GBR Coventry Car Company

- #14 AUT Jochen Rindt
- #15 MEX Pedro Rodríguez
- #12 BEL Jacky Ickx
- #17 SUI Jo Siffert
- #11 SWE Joakim Bonnier

USA Anglo-American Racers

- #9 USA Dan Gurney
- #19 NZL Bruce McLaren
- #10 USA Richie Ginther

ITA Scuderia Ferrari

- #18 ITA Lorenzo Bandini
- #3 NZL Chris Amon
- #20 GBR Mike Parkes
- #16 ITA Ludovico Scarfiotti

GBR Team Lotus

- #5 GBR Jim Clark
- #6 GBR Graham Hill

JPN Murasama Motors

- #7 GBR John Surtees

== Development ==
The game was in development for three years with a team of 25 to 30 people. Inspired by the 1966 film Grand Prix, the developers chose to base the game on the 1967 Formula 1 Grand Prix season because during that period tracks were narrow and lined with trees, houses, and other elements that in a video game can serve as backgrounds to enhance the sensation of speed. In addition, the more primitive suspension of cars of the time meant that the car physics could be more visually dramatic.

However, the amount of time that has passed since the 1967 Grand Prix season meant that some of the tracks the designers wanted to recreate no longer existed in their original form. The team visited town halls to get blueprints for defunct tracks. Papyrus co-founder Dave Kaemmer commented that the licensing for the game was difficult, but they had people who helped them during the development.

== Reception ==
=== Critical reception ===
Reception

Aggregate score
Aggregator	Score
GameRankings	84%

Review scores
Publication	Score
CNET Gamecenter	9/10
Computer Games Strategy Plus	4.5/5
Computer Gaming World	4/5
Edge	9/10
GamePro	4.5/5
GameRevolution	A
GameSpot	8.9/10
Jeuxvideo.com	17/20
Next Generation	5/5
PC Accelerator	7/10
PC Gamer (US)	70%
PC Zone	90%

The game received "favorable" reviews according to the review aggregation website GameRankings. GameSpot said that Grand Prix Legends has the most intense racing experience ever seen on a personal computer. Next Generation highly praised the graphics, gameplay, the recreation of 1967 Grand Prix season (in addition to its cars and tracks of its era), artificial intelligence and realistic driving model physics. The magazine ranked it at #47 in its list of the Fifty Best Games of All Time.

=== Sales ===
The game was a commercial failure; Andy Mahood of PC Gamer US described its sales as "abysmally poor". In 2003, writer Mark H. Walker reported that "the game sold only a few thousand copies" in the United States, which he attributed to the general unpopularity of Formula One racing in the country. He noted that its "steep learning curve kept many fans away" in European markets. GameSpot's Gord Goble attributed its performance to the "combination of treacherous gameplay, sometimes glacial frame rates, and esoteric subject matter". It ultimately totalled 200,000 sales by 2004.

Despite its commercial underperformance, the game developed a cult following among racing simulator fans attracted by its realism and challenge. A number of fan mods were developed and adopted by players.

=== Awards ===
The game was the runner-up for Computer Gaming World's 1998 "Best Driving" award, and for GameSpot's 1998 "Driving Game of the Year" award, both of which ultimately went to Need for Speed III: Hot Pursuit. The staff of the former commented that Grand Prix Legends was the most ambitious and realistic driving simulation game of 1998, and the toughest to play.

The game won Computer Games Strategy Plus' 1998 "Sports Game of the Year" award. The staff wrote that a few racing games could come close to Grand Prix Racing's level of sophistication and uncompromising detail. It also won the Best Racing Game award at the 1998 CNET Gamecenter Awards.
