= Le Mans 24 Hours video games =

Endurance sports car racing games

A number of racing video games have been made of the 24 Hours of Le Mans endurance race, with the earliest example going as far back as 1976 with LeMans. There have only been a handful of game releases exclusive to Le Mans, although numerous games have included content related to the endurance race as base content or downloadable content, including its host circuit, Circuit de la Sarthe.

== History ==
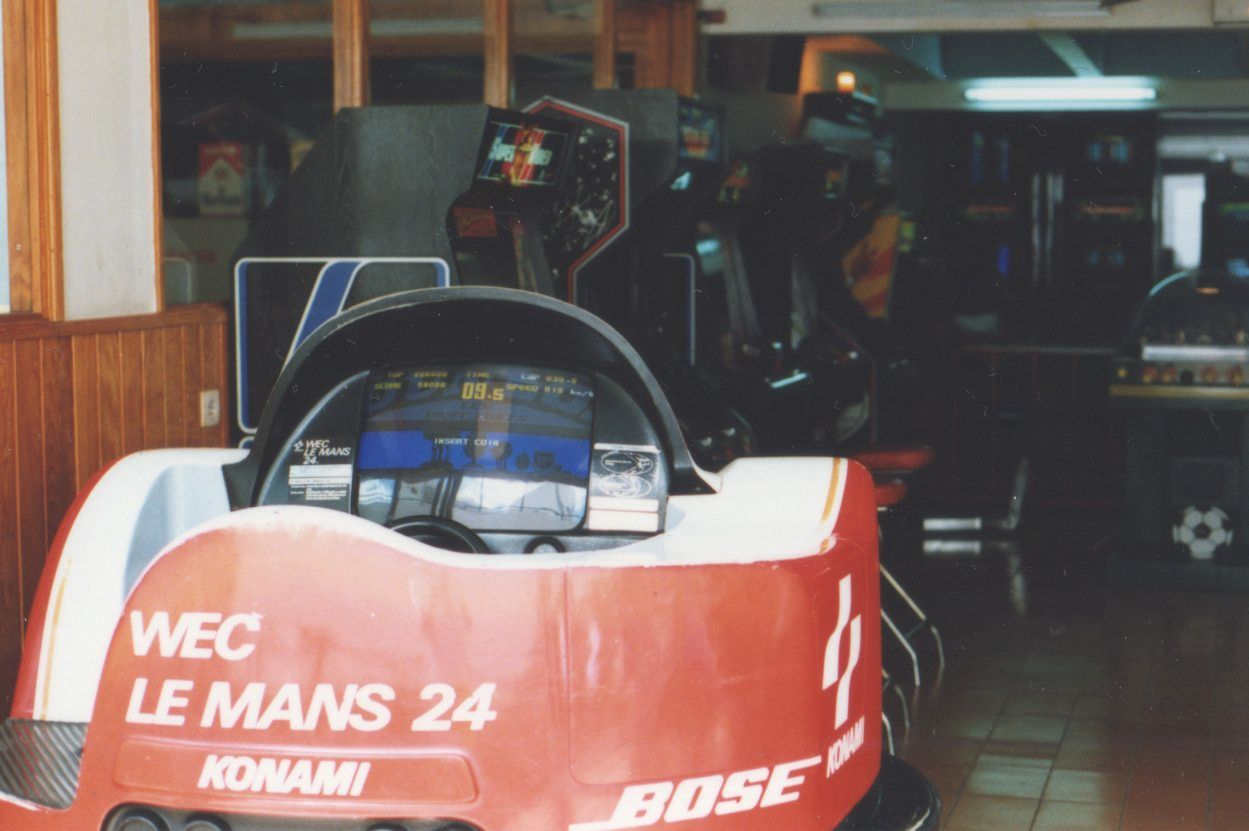
A WEC Le Mans 24 (1986) machine alongside other upright arcade machines.

The first Le Mans video game was in 1976 by Atari called LeMans, an upright standing arcade game with a steering wheel and white raster graphics on a black background.

Six years later, in 1982, Commodore released Le Mans for the Commodore 64, which itself was a clone of a 1979 game by Sega, Monaco GP.

In 1986, Konami released the arcade game WEC Le Mans. The game was subsequently ported to a number of home computers by Ocean Software the following year, particularly the Amstrad CPC, Commodore 64, MSX, and ZX Spectrum. The game broke down the race in four laps, two on daytime and two after sunset, divided into three checkpoints. Due to the limitations of the hardware, all cars had the same 3D model, although they did feature different liveries corresponding to those used by real-world sports cars. The advertising in both sides of the road were also limited to the name of the game and its creators.

Over ten years later, in 1997, Sega released the arcade exclusive Le Mans 24. As a Japanese publisher, the game marked a debut for the 1991 winner, the Mazda 787B, before appearing in subsequent driving games including the later Gran Turismo series, the 1971 JWA Gulf Porsche 917K appears as a bonus car.

Two years later, the French video game publisher Infogrames, who incidentally absorbed Ocean Software, released Le Mans 24 Hours for PlayStation and PC. The game was developed by British company Eutechnyx. In the United States, the game was released under the name Test Drive: Le Mans. In the following year, Eutechnyx released the game on the Dreamcast. This version of the game was originally planned to be a port from the PlayStation, but was eventually developed from scratch by Australian company Melbourne House which had been purchased by Infogrames at the time. As with the previous PlayStation version, the Dreamcast game was released in the US under their Test Drive brand as Test Drive: Le Mans. This was one of the most critically acclaimed racing games on the Dreamcast, often hailed as the single best driving game available for the Dreamcast system. Following the release of the Dreamcast version of Le Mans 24 Hours, Infogrames and Melbourne House developed and released a port of the Dreamcast game on the PlayStation 2 in 2001. In 2002, a PC port of the Le Mans 24 Hours game was created by another Australian video game developer, Torus.

While itself not a Le Mans game, rFactor 2 previously hosted the 24 Hours of Le Mans Virtual, an esports sim racing event simulating the 24 Hours of Le Mans hosted by Motorsport Games, and officially sanctioned by the Automobile Club de l'Ouest and the FIA World Endurance Championship. The first installment in 2020 saw two red flags, with the 2023 edition of the race seeing the servers suffering a security breach and rFactor 2's stability being called into question.

On July 22, 2025, Motorsport Games and Dutch developer Studio 397 released Le Mans Ultimate, an officially licensed simulation of the 24 Hours of Le Mans, as well as the FIA World Endurance Championship and European Le Mans Series. The game became notable for its in-depth simulation of the Le Mans Hypercar and LMDh hybrid systems and tire model behavior.

=== Other games featuring Le Mans ===
Several racing games in the modern era have featured content related to (such as Circuit de la Sarthe), and sometimes loosely depicting, the 24 Hours of Le Mans.

One of the earliest examples of the event's host track Circuit de la Sarthe being featured in a racing game is in Gran Turismo 4, released in 2004 by Polyphony Digital. It used the then-current layout and could be run with or without the two Mulsanne chicanes. The game was the first example of a racing video game featuring the ability to run a full-length 24-hour race, which the player could do against five other opponent cars. The opponent vehicles ranged from Le Mans Prototype cars, such as the BMW V12 LMR and the Audi R8, to Group C sports prototypes, such as the Sauber C9 and the Mazda 787B. Future installments featuring layouts from when the game was released also featured the circuit, those being Gran Turismo 5, Gran Turismo 6, Gran Turismo Sport, and Gran Turismo 7.

Race Driver: Grid, released in 2008 by Codemasters, also featured the ability to race all 24 hours, as well as condensed versions running 12 minutes, 24 minutes, one hour, and so forth. According to the time scale chosen, day and night occur at different times. Cars and drivers from the 2006 24 Hours of Le Mans are featured. The Circuit de la Sarthe depicted in the game, however, is much wider, with corners such as Dunlop and Arnage having a much shorter run in, and with significant elevation changes on the track, such as the Hunaudières curve, almost imperceptible.

The circuit is also featured in the Forza series, beginning in Forza Motorsport 3, later included in Forza Motorsport 4, Forza Motorsport 5, Forza Motorsport 6, Forza Motorsport 7, and Forza Motorsport in 2023.

iRacing, released in 2008, saw the addition of the Le Mans circuit in 2016.

Project CARS and Project CARS 2 from Slightly Mad Studios included Circuit de la Sarthe under the project name Loire.

== List ==
Title	Platform(s)	Release date	Developer / Publisher
LeMans	Arcade	1976	Atari, Inc.
Le Mans	Commodore 64	1982	Commodore
WEC Le Mans	Arcade, Amstrad CPC, Commodore 64, MSX, ZX Spectrum	September 1986	Konami
Le Mans 24	Arcade	August 1997	Sega
Le Mans 24 Hours	Windows, Dreamcast, Game Boy Color, PlayStation, PlayStation 2	November 26, 1999	Eutechnyx / Infogrames
Le Mans	Mobile	2006	Infospace
Le Mans Ultimate	Windows	July 22, 2025	Studio 397 / Motorsport Games
