= 24 Hours of Le Mans (disambiguation) =

The 24 Hours of Le Mans is an annual sports car race in France.

24 Hours of Le Mans may also refer to:

- 24 Hours of Le Mans (motorcycle race), a motorcycle endurance race
- Le Mans 24 Hours video games including:
  - WEC Le Mans, an arcade game
  - Le Mans 24 (video game)
  - Le Mans 24 Hours (video game), also known as Test Drive Le Mans

== See also ==
- 24 Hours of LeMons, an endurance race that is a parody of the one in France
