= 24 Hours of Le Mans Virtual =

The 24 Hours of Le Mans Virtual is an esports 24-hour automobile endurance race. Part of the Le Mans Virtual Series, it simulates the 24 Hours of Le Mans, with drivers competing in Le Mans Prototype (LMP) and Le Mans Grand Touring Endurance (LMGTE) vehicles. The 24 Hours of Le Mans Virtual is held on a simulated version of the Circuit de la Sarthe. The event is hosted by the Automobile Club de l'Ouest and the FIA World Endurance Championship on Motorsport Games' rFactor 2. So far, the event has been held three times; 2020, 2022 and 2023.
