= Sports Car GT =

1999 video game

- Cover art featuring a BMW M3 from the 1998 IMSA GT Championship
- Developers: Point of View (PS); Image Space Incorporated (PC); Westwood Pacific/Burst Studios
- Publisher: Electronic Arts
- Engine: gMotor1 (PC)
- Platforms: PlayStation, Windows
- Release: PlayStation: NA: March 31, 1999; EU: April 23, 1999; Windows: NA: April 30, 1999
- Genre: Sim racing
- Modes: Single-player, multiplayer

Sports Car GT is a 1999 racing sim video game published by Electronic Arts (EA). Based on real-life sports car racing, it is a simulator but with a slight arcade-style gameplay. It was developed by Image Space Incorporated (ISI) for Microsoft Windows, and by Point of View for PlayStation, resulting in two distinct versions.

Sports Car GT was initially a project of Virgin Interactive until Electronic Arts bought its North American division from Westwood Studios. Development began in early 1997 starting as a licensed game based on the IMSA GT Championship, as part of a deal in which Virgin Interactive started sponsoring their Supreme GT Series. The game underwent various titles and a console version was set to be released as Sports Car Supreme GT in October 1998 while a PC version had the title Professional Sports Car Racing, both with licensed Professional SportsCar Racing (PSCR) branding shown on pre-release advertizing. However amid Virgin Interactive's takeover, Electronic Arts decided to publish the game delayed to 1999 under the name Sports Car GT, and it ended up without the official PSCR license.

The game features a range of licensed cars from manufacturers including BMW, McLaren, Porsche, Panoz, Vector, Mosler, Callaway, Lister and Saleen, including their specific paintjobs from the 1998 and 1997 IMSA seasons, as well as the roster of the championship's real tracks. The PlayStation version of Sports Car GT received mixed or negative reviews, whereas the PC version received a favorable reception: it received a following and many mods have been developed for it. It is a spiritual predecessor to rFactor and rFactor 2.

== Gameplay ==
Screenshot of Sports Car GT on Windows

Sports Car GT consists of two main single-player modes (as named in their PlayStation and PC versions respectively): season or career, and arcade or quick race - the PlayStation version also includes a time trial mode. In the season/career mode, the player has to race in four GT classes, starting in the GT qualifying class (GTQ) and progressively get to GT3, GT2 and GT1 classes. The player begins with $50,000 (PlayStation) or 100,000 credits (PC) to purchase their first car in the GTQ class, earning more cash/credits throughout when finishing in the top three in races. The difficulty and length of races in career mode can be adjusted in the PC version.

Progressively this means the player would be able to upgrade their car's components such as brakes, suspension and exhaust, or sell it altogether in favor of purchasing a different car. For optimum performance of the car, components can be tweaked such as the brakes, suspension, ride height, and downforce. In the PlayStation version, after completing the GT1 class (the final race of which is 20 laps at Sebring International Raceway), the player gets invited to a bonus class named Paris GT1, made up of three street tracks set in Paris, France. On the other hand the PC version unlocks the World GT class, consisting of races in all prior tracks.

Three fictional tracks also appear on the PC version: Chatham, Sardian Park and North Point. Single-player races may take place in daylight or nighttime with various weather conditions and there are either fifteen (PC) or five (PS) computer-controlled opponents. Multiplayer modes include 'pink slip', where two players duel each other and the winner wins the loser's car which gets transferred between their PlayStation memory cards. On PC, LAN network play is possible between up to sixteen human players.

== Reception ==
Reception

Aggregate score
Aggregator	Score	
Aggregator	PC	PS
GameRankings	80%	55%

Review scores
Publication	Score	
Publication	PC	PS
AllGame	N/A	1.5/5
CNET Gamecenter	7/10	7/10
Computer Games Strategy Plus	4/5	N/A
Electronic Gaming Monthly	N/A	5.625/10
Game Informer	N/A	6/10
GameFan	N/A	78%
GamePro	4/5	3/5
GameSpot	8.2/10	3.8/10
IGN	7.3/10	4/10
PlayStation Official Magazine – UK	N/A	2/10
Official U.S. PlayStation Magazine	N/A	2.5/5
PC Gamer (US)	83%	N/A

The PC version received "favorable" reviews, while the PlayStation version received "mixed" reviews, according to the review aggregation website GameRankings. CD Mag rated the PC version 4 out of 5, giving praise to the physics, computer AI, and compared it to "Need for Speed meets Gran Turismo". It also commented that both cars and tracks were "flat-out gorgeous representations of their real-life counterparts"

Other reviewers have also praised the graphics. PC Gamer gave it 83 out of 100 saying that it provides the balance of playability and realism. Electric Games with a score of 7 out of 10 praised the graphics, the car and track designs, and car handling, but disliked HUD and lack of visible damage.

On the contrary, the PlayStation version received a more negative reception. Game Informer thought that the graphics were "dull" and instead recommended Gran Turismo or Need For Speed: High Stakes as better alternatives. GameSpot rated it 3.8 out of 10 calling it "unpolished" and criticizing the music, physics and graphics. IGN gave it 4/10 and praised the official licenses of the various cars, but said that the graphics are outdated "in almost every department", though credited the weather and night lighting effects.

== Legacy ==
Engadget called the PC game a "classic" of the sim racing genre. The PC game retained a following and the game's open engine means hundreds of mods were made for it by the community. This includes the addition of hundreds of cars, including the likes of Monster trucks and Minis, with some dating back to the 1920s, and hundreds of real and fictional race tracks too.

In 2005, Image Space Incorporated, the developers of Sports Car GT, released the multi-class sim rFactor and the successor to the GMotor 1 engine first used in Sports Car GT for Windows. It is considered to be the spiritual successor to Sports Car GT.
