= Tony Rust Race Track =

Race track in Namibia

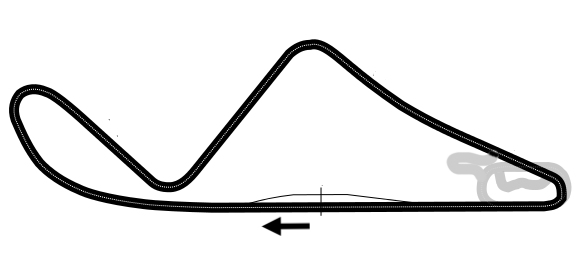
- Main Circuit (1984-present)
- Location: Near Windhoek, Khomas, Namibia
- Coordinates: 22°34′8″S 17°0′0,5″E
- Owner: Windhoek Motor Club
- Opened: 1984; 42 years ago
- Construction cost: 500,000N$ renovation (2013-2015)
- Major events: Windhoek Motor Club National Circuit Championship

Main Circuit (1984–present)
- Surface: Asphalt
- Length: 2.6 km (1.6 mi)
- Turns: 5

Dragster Track
- Length: 0.4 km (0.25 mi)

Kart Track
- Length: 0.44 km (0.27 mi)
- Turns: 11

The Tony Rust Race Track is the only permanent motor racing track in Namibia. It is named after former Namibian motor racing star Tony Rust, who was also president of the Namibian Motor Racing Federation in the mid-2000s.

== Story ==
The track was built in 1984 on hilly terrain. In 2013, renovations and adaptations to FIA standards began. In 2014, the track surface was renewed and new curbs and a new timing system with a transponder system were installed. Plans to enlarge the kart track and extend the run-off areas in the corners of the main track are also underway. The extensive construction work, including the renovation of the main grandstand, was completed in 2015. The construction costs of approximately 500,000 Namibian dollars were borne by the Windhoek Motor Club and the Ministry of Youth, National Services, Sports and Culture .

== Route description ==
The circuit is 2,600 meters long and is located approximately 9 km west of Windhoek . The sports complex also includes a go-kart track . The start-finish straight was also used for drag races over the classic quarter mile (approx. 400 m). With a combination of 36 m elevation changes with long straights and five corners, it is one of the fastest circuits in southern Africa.

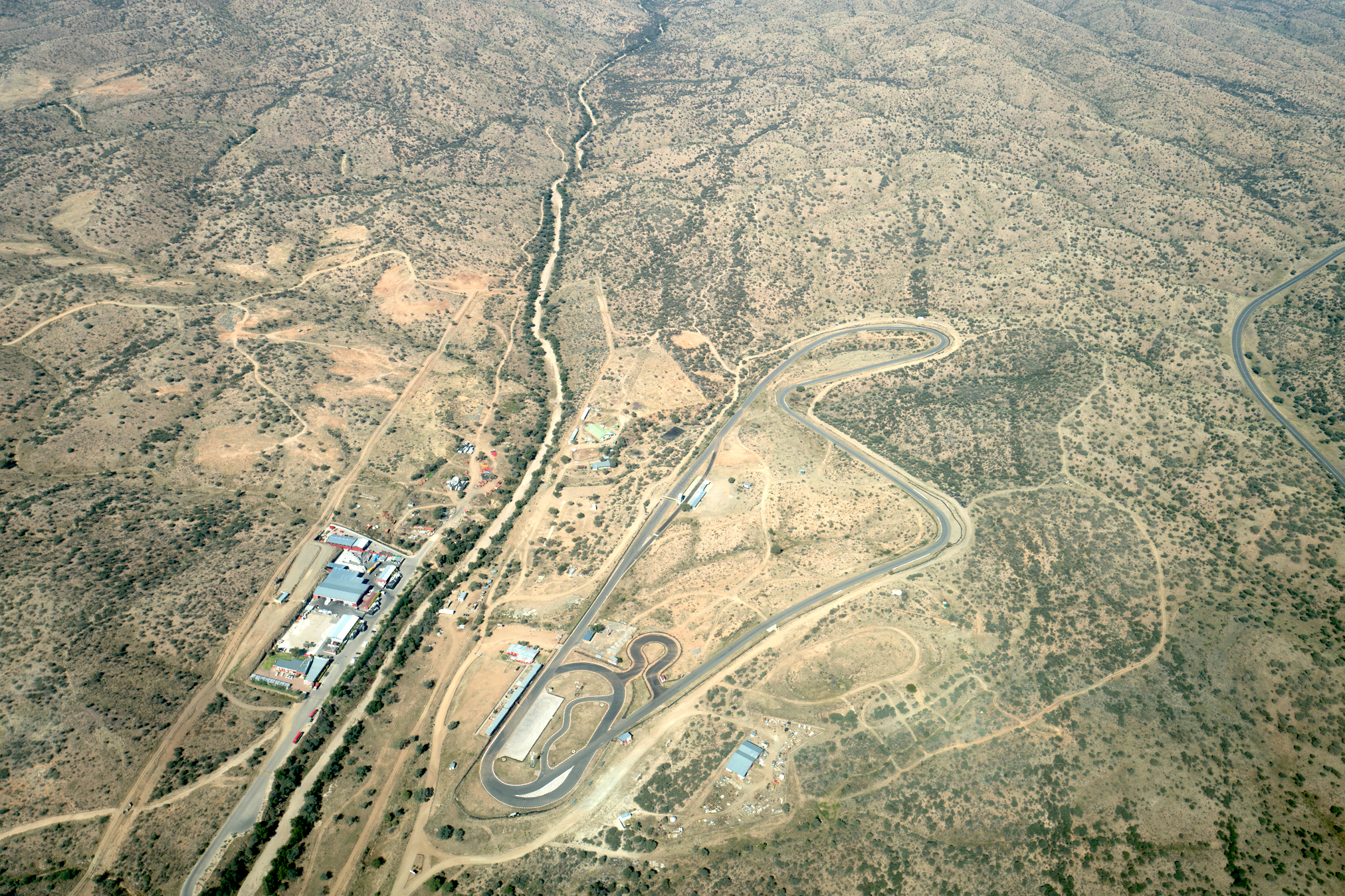
Aerial view of the circuit

== Media ==
The circuit is featured as a mod for Assetto Corsa and rFactor.

== Weblinks ==
- Windhoek Motor Club, Facebook page of the operating club
- Windhoek on the race track database Circuiti nel Mondo
- Tony Rust Race Track on event database Racing-Calendar.net
- Namibia Motorsport Federation
