= RFactor =

2005 video game

rFactor
- rFactor logo
- Developer: Image Space Incorporated
- Publisher: Image Space Incorporated
- Designer: Image Space Incorporated
- Engine: isiMotor2
- Platform: Microsoft Windows
- Release: NA: August 30-31, 2005
- Genre: Racing simulation
- Modes: Single-player, multiplayer

rFactor is a computer racing simulator designed for hardcore simulation racers. rFactor claimed to be the most accurate race simulator of its time. Released in August 2005, it competed with games like NASCAR Racing 2003 Season, Live for Speed, and GTR. The game featured many technical advances in tire modeling, complex aerodynamics and a 15 degrees of freedom physics engine. It also featured multiplayer.

rFactor was developed by Image Space Incorporated (ISI), which has been developing simulators since the early 1990s for both commercial and military purposes. The isiMotor2 on which the game is based is a direct successor to the engine used in previous titles developed by ISI, most notably F1 Challenge '99–'02, released through EA Sports. The isiMotor2 engine was also used in many other simulation games, and in rFpro. The game was made without ISI's longtime publishing partner at the time of EA Sports, and featured exclusively custom tracks rather than licensing real ones.

== Development ==
BMW Sauber vehicle in a promotional image

rFactor is an evolution of F1 Challenge '99–'02, but without the licensing of Formula One circuits and teams. As such, rFactor's initial release only included four fictitious circuits (seven as of v1.087), with about a dozen layouts within these facilities and there were about six vehicle classes, including two open wheel and four sedan classes. Among its most notable features was a rich interface for creating custom game contents, which made it possible for amateurs to create additional vehicles and tracks for the game. In August 2006, ISI released the full update, with many changes and new features, including the new 2006 BMW Sauber F1 and a much requested manual. Another notable and often requested feature was driver-swapping, which allowed to change drivers during the race, enabling up to 24 hour events like Le Mans.

A feature was added to allow the AI to "learn a track", which teaches the AI the ideal way to drive a particular circuit. As of v1.150, the AI was improved, leading to notably faster driving styles. Version 1.250 was released in January 2007. A patch was released on October 12 the same year that brought the version to 1.255 build F. rFactor also advertises an advanced tire model, aiming to be much better than the Pacejka model previously used in most simulators. rFactor's tire model simulates a non-linear tire use cycle according to temperature and wear.

F1 Challenge proved to be popular for online racing over the Internet through GameSpy, which allowed any player to find available games. rFactor has extended this in several ways. The central server is handled by ISI themselves, so finding other games is effectively the same, but the central server will show all races and practice sessions over a web interface known as Racecast. There are also career statistics available for registered drivers. The game server can be run from a dedicated program, free from the need to render graphics. It can run mixtures of human and computer controlled (AI) vehicles.

In an evolution from F1 Challenge, the circuits now include all layouts at a particular facility, which greatly reduces the need to duplicate track geometry. The game can easily accommodate different sorts of vehicles and games between multiple classes of vehicles are possible. rFactor also has a plugin-interface for third-party addons to hook in, which allows for features like screen-overlays or radio chatter.

== Reception ==
Reception

Aggregate score
Aggregator	Score
GameRankings	86%

Review score
Publication	Score
HonestGamers	8/10

In an early review of an rFactor preview, published on AutoSimSport, Jon Denton said: "What the tire model in rFactor does very well is that it models the relationship between slip angle, self aligning torque and cornering force - and it does this better than anything that has come before".

Writing on HonestGamers, Paul Josua concluded: "It's a little unfair to hold rFactor's lack of accessibility against it as it has clearly set out to be a simulation racer. It does a fine job of that, but those who don't demand flawless simulation are better served looking elsewhere".

rFactor was a finalist for PC Gamer US's "Best Racing Game 2005" award, which ultimately went to GTR: FIA GT Racing.

== Sequel ==
ISI developed rFactor 2, which includes weather effects, reflections and accurate shadows on a variety of textures. It was released on March 28, 2013.

== See also ==
- ARCA Sim Racing '08
- GT Legends
- GTR 2 – FIA GT Racing Game
- NASCAR Racing 2003 Season
- rFactor 2
- Simraceway
