= NASCAR 21: Ignition =

2021 racing video game

- Cover art featuring Bubba Wallace, Chase Elliott, and Ryan Blaney
- Developer: Motorsport Games
- Publisher: Motorsport Games
- Engine: Unreal Engine 4, rFactor 2
- Platforms: Microsoft Windows; PlayStation 4 Xbox One; PlayStation 5 Xbox Series X Xbox Series S
- Release: October 28, 2021: PS4, Windows, Xbox One; October 28, 2021; PS5, Series X/S; June 23, 2022
- Genre: Racing
- Modes: Single-player, multiplayer

NASCAR 21: Ignition is a racing video game simulating the 2021 and 2022 NASCAR Cup Series seasons. It was developed and published by Motorsport Games and was released on October 28, 2021, for PlayStation 4, Xbox One and Microsoft Windows via Steam, with a further release on PlayStation 5 and Xbox Series X/S consoles on June 23, 2022. The game received mixed reviews.

The cover athletes are Cup drivers for each manufacturer: Chase Elliott for Chevrolet, Bubba Wallace for Toyota, and Ryan Blaney for Ford. Bill Elliott is on the cover of the Champions Edition version of the game, which released two days prior, and allows players to race as Bill himself (using a 2019-2021 Gen 6 NASCAR Cup Series Ford Mustang with his 1983 Melling paint scheme).

== Development ==
The game was built from the ground up, development on the game started around 2019 when Motorsport Games bought 704Games and received all of their assets. The game is powered by Unreal Engine 4 using rFactor 2's physics engine.

=== Downloadable content ===
On November 11, 2021, a downloadable content (DLC) package was released featuring Darlington Raceway themed throwbacks. Cars from the 2021 Goodyear 400 throwback round were featured, and a second NASCAR Hall of Fame member, Darrell Waltrip.

The game was later updated on November 18, 2021, with patch v.1.25, with fixes and additional hardware support. On December 7, 2021, the game was updated to version 1.3.0 which added more wheel support and options while fixing some minor bugs. Three days later, a "Patriotic Pack" was released which included NASCAR legend Matt Kenseth in his 2003 championship paint scheme. January 25, 2022 saw the release of another patch, which included the addition of stages and other bug fixes. Two days later, the "Playoff Pack" was added with 80+ new schemes and NASCAR legend Bobby Labonte with his Interstate Batteries paint scheme. In February 2022, there was another update which saw the addition of a test mode for the No. 78 Live Fast Motorsports 2022 Ford Mustang at Daytona International Speedway. In April 2022, Motorsport Games announced that there would be no new NASCAR title for the 2022 NASCAR Cup Series, but instead a DLC for the 2022 NCS season, in which came out October 6.

== Reception ==
Reception

Aggregate score
Aggregator	Score
Metacritic	(PS4) 53/100

The PlayStation 4 version of NASCAR 21: Ignition received "mixed or average reviews" according to review aggregator Metacritic.

Screen Rant said that the game was "chock full of bugs at launch".

== Notes ==
1. "Champions Edition" released on October 26, 2021
