= Le Mans Ultimate =

2024 racing video game

- Cover art featuring the BMW M Hybrid V8, Ferrari 499P, and Toyota GR010 Hybrid
- Developer: Studio 397
- Publisher: Motorsport Games
- Designers: Corey Hobson; Greger Huttu; Danny Bray; Rick Oosthof; Denise Pope
- Programmer: Peter Nichols
- Artist: Alex Sawczuk
- Engine: isiMotor 2.5
- Platform: Microsoft Windows
- Release: 22 July 2025
- Genre: Sim racing
- Modes: Single-player, multiplayer

Le Mans Ultimate is a sim racing video game developed by Dutch video game developer Studio 397 and published by Motorsport Games. The game is an officially licensed simulation of the FIA World Endurance Championship, European Le Mans Series, and the 24 Hours of Le Mans, and focuses on Le Mans Hypercar, LMP2, GTE, and LMGT3 cars. The game was first released as an early access title on 20 February 2024, officially releasing a year later on 22 July 2025.

Originally slated for release in December 2023, the date was pushed back to February 2024 before Studio 397 switched to an early access model just weeks prior to the official release of the game. The game is currently featured only on PC, but console versions are being considered with porting agencies the likely method, according to Motorsport Games CEO Stephen Hood.

== Gameplay ==
As the FIA World Endurance Championship's officially licensed simulation, Le Mans Ultimate includes the series' official car classes and manufacturers featured since the 2023 season and onwards, those being Le Mans Hypercar, LMP2, GTE, and LMGT3. Race tracks used both currently and previously by the FIA WEC since 2023 are also present in the game, including Sebring, Portimão, Spa-Francorchamps, Circuit de la Sarthe, Monza, Fuji, and Bahrain.

Le Mans Ultimate later became the officially licensed simulation for the European Le Mans Series, officially releasing downloadable content in September 2025, including a new car class and a racing circuit, those being LMP3 and Silverstone Circuit.

Race Weekend is Le Mans Ultimate's single-player mode where players can set how many classes will be on track, weather forecast, time scaling, fuel usage scaling, and tyre wear scaling. Online multiplayer is present in early access and is powered by RaceControl, Motorsport Games' online racing platform. Players can compete in daily races, limited timed special events, or create a private session for select players to join.

== Development ==
The game is built on the isiMotor 2.5 engine, developed by Image Space Incorporated for use in rFactor 2. Le Mans Ultimate also features Real Road 3.0, which is a system that allows for dynamic simulation of a race track's surface, including changing surface conditions as cars drive over a race track and the simulation of rain and puddles affecting the environment of a circuit.

Before becoming its own release, the basis of Le Mans Ultimate was originally intended to be for the successor of the rFactor 2 video game, in the form of rFactor 3.

=== Free content updates ===
Le Mans Ultimate has since expanded with free content, with new cars, tracks, and liveries being added to the game. The game's June 2024 early access update saw the addition of the BMW M Hybrid V8. Three months later on the game's December 2024 early access update, which introduced LMGT3 cars to the game for the first time, the Ford Mustang GT3 and McLaren 720S GT3 Evo were made available for free.

As part of Le Mans Ultimate's exit from early access officially releasing on 22 July 2025, the Aston Martin Valkyrie AMR-LMH and Mercedes-AMG GT3 Evo were added to the game.

The game's version 1.3 update saw the addition of the Genesis GMR-001 to the game two weeks prior to the car's competitive debut at the 2026 6 Hours of Imola.

Ahead of the 2026 24 Hours of Le Mans, Studio 397 added liveries from the 2026 FIA World Endurance Championship and introduced the ADESS AD25 and Toyota TR010 Hybrid.

=== Content for additional charge ===
The first set of DLC releases for Le Mans Ultimate added content centered around the 2024 FIA World Endurance Championship, which was divided in five separate packs, beginning with the 2024 Pack 1 DLC released on 23 July 2024. It included the Lamborghini SC63, the updated winged Peugeot 9X8 first introduced at the 2024 6 Hours of Imola, and Imola Circuit. Subsequent packs added the Alpine A424, Isotta Fraschini Tipo 6 LMH-C, and Circuit of the Americas in 2024 Pack 2, the BMW M4 GT3, Chevrolet Corvette Z06 GT3.R, Ferrari 296 GT3, and Interlagos Circuit in 2024 Pack 3, the Aston Martin Vantage AMR GT3 Evo and Porsche 911 GT3 R in 2024 Pack 4, and the Lamborghini Huracán GT3 EVO2, Lexus RC F GT3 and Lusail International Circuit in 2024 Pack 5.

Studio 397 released their first of three DLC packs for the 2025 European Le Mans Series with ELMS Pack 1 on 23 September 2025, adding the Ligier JS P325 and Silverstone Circuit. ELMS Pack 2 was released on 9 December 2025, adding the Ginetta G61-LT-P3 Evo and Circuit Paul Ricard. The final pack of the series, ELMS Pack 3, would be released on 31 March 2026, adding the Duqueine D09 and Circuit de Barcelona-Catalunya.

On 4 July 2026, Studio 397 announced the US Track Pass DLC, adding six American racing circuits into the game. The tracks are set to be the first pair of major endurance racing venues not featured in the FIA World Endurance Championship or European Le Mans Series. The pack's initial teaser confirmed the inclusion of Daytona International Speedway and Laguna Seca.

== Reception ==
Reception

Aggregate score
Aggregator	Score
Metacritic	76/100

Review score
Publication	Score
Video Games Chronicle	4/5

Le Mans Ultimate received "generally favorable" reviews from critics according to review aggregator website Metacritic.

In its 2025 review, Video Games Chronicle's Mike Channell highlights the game's handling model, writing that "the degree of communication via the handling model about how the car is behaving on the track surface is second to none", while also criticizing the game's lack of single-player features, such as no career mode feature, concluding that Le Mans Ultimate is "not necessarily a great game, but a genuinely exceptional sim."

=== Awards ===
Year	Award	Category	Result	Ref.
2026	The Steam Awards 2025	VR Game of the Year	Nominated	
