= Live for Speed =

Racing simulator

- Genre: Racing simulation
- Developers: Scawen Roberts, Eric Bailey and Victor van Vlaardingen
- Publishers: Scawen Roberts, Eric Bailey and Victor van Vlaardingen
- Platforms: Microsoft Windows (Single player, Multiplayer)
- Original release: First public version; 18 August 2002; Stage 1; 17 July 2003; Stage 2; 24 June 2005; Stage 3; 19 December 2015
- Latest release: (0.7G) 15 August 2025

Live for Speed (LFS) is a racing simulator developed by a three-person team comprising Scawen Roberts, Eric Bailey, and Victor van Vlaardingen with its latest release in 2025. The main focus is to provide a realistic racing experience for the online multiplayer game and to allow single player races against AI cars. Users can set personal bests which can then be uploaded to LFSWorld in hotlap mode, and take driving lessons in 'training' mode.

LFS is entirely distributed via the Internet. It can be downloaded and installed for free from the official website, but unlocking all of the content (and some features) requires purchasing a license. Without a license it functions as a content-limited demo without time restrictions, with only one track and three cars available.

== Gameplay ==
LFS features input support for steering wheels, mice, keyboards, joysticks, and gamepads. It supports output to 2D and 3D including virtual reality headsets since June 2014.

Races can either be set to end at a certain number of laps, or be set to run for a certain length of time, as seen in endurance racing. There is support for refueling and tire changes in pit stops and mid-race adjustment of pit strategy. Pit lane speed limits of 80 km/h (50 mph) are enforced by penalties similar to those seen in real motorsport, including drive-through, stop and go, or time penalties. Starting grids can be determined at random, from the finishing positions in the previous race, or from the results in a qualifying period before the race.

A training mode is included to help drivers acquaint themselves with driving skills and the handling characteristics of each car. The lessons cover subjects such as cornering, throttle and brake control, and negotiating opponents. To pass each lesson, the lesson must be completed within a certain set of objectives. They are arranged as in sets, one for each car and ordered from slow to fast. Each lesson must be completed before advancing to the next, however, completing them is not necessary to unlock cars, as all are available in any other mode from the beginning.

== Simulation ==
Among other things, the physics engine simulates tires, the suspension, aerodynamics, the drivetrain, several gearbox types, clutch overheating, car body damage, and engine damage. The tire model features dynamic wear, dynamic dirt, flat spots, hot spots and tire wall deformation.

The simulator supports 3D devices, including 3D TVs, headsets, projectors, the HTC Vive, and Oculus Rift (both DK1 and DK2, from version 0.6F and 0.6G).

== Cars ==
LX4, a lightweight two-seater sports car

The S2 release offers a total of 20 different vehicles. They range from beginner-friendly models to cars more suited for players with more experience. There is a broad power spectrum, ranging from under 100 hp to over 700 hp. The cars range from fictional sports cars, GT DTM-like race cars and former JGTC series cars to road legal hatchbacks.

While LFS' car selection mainly includes fictional cars, it also has five real officially licensed cars:

- BMW Sauber F1.06
- Formula BMW FB02
- McGill University's Formula SAE (in conjunction with McGill Racing Team)
- Valmet RaceAbout 2003 concept sports car designed by Helsinki Polytechnic Stadia
- Volkswagen Scirocco (Not yet released)

From December 2021, starting with version 0.7A, LFS added vehicle mods support. LFS Editor has been released as a separate download, with which players can create, alter or import vehicles or models into LFS. An online system has been developed to support automatic download of mods in-game (like with car skins), as well as a web-based and an in-game mod browser.

== Tracks ==
LFS has eight different fictional track areas, including one loosely based on eastern central London, one based on Jamaican surroundings and one near Kyoto, Japan. Each one of them has several different configurations and each of those can be also driven in reversed configuration. The simulator also contains a laser-scanned version of Rockingham Motor Speedway as part of the S3 license. Additionally, users can create their own custom layouts using cones and other objects with the in-game autocross editor; the three car park environments in the game are useful for creating such layouts.

== Releases ==
The game is intended to be released in three parts, S1 (Stage 1), S2, and S3. Each stage will feature improvements in many areas, such as physics model, graphics and sound. Technical improvements introduced in each new stage become available for previous stages as well, with the main difference between stages being additional cars and tracks, as well as the maximum number of players connected to a server.

A fully working, commercial, alpha version of Stage 2 was released on 24 June 2005. Stage 3 was launched on 19 December 2015, and the latest patch (0.7G) was released in August 2025. Some backward compatibility exists; an S3 license holder may also be able to access servers for S2, S1 or demo servers.

== Competition ==
Formula BMW

LFS was used in Intel Racing Tour, a competition arranged in Germany in 2007 with a brand new BMW Z4 (E85) car as the main prize for the winner. Thanks to Intel Racing Tour, the BMW Sauber F1.06 was added to the game in an update.

LFS is also related to V1 Championship which was launched in 2008 and shown on TV in the United Kingdom. V1 Championship is a competition arranged by a company called V1 Championship Limited whose aim is to discover a new British racing driver talent. LFS was used as a part of the driver selection process in addition to physical and psychological tests before testing in real cars. If successful in V1 Championship, the contender would acquire a seat in a racing team and would have required to fully commit to have a career in motorsport.

Thanks to this co-operation with V1 Championship, LFS acquired a license to use the Formula BMW car and to help at modelling it to the game. An opportunity to add Rockingham Motor Speedway to LFS came through a contact from V1 Championship, and the track has been announced to be part of the S3 content. However, the track was not playable until game version 0.6K, released in December 2015.

== Future development ==
LFS was used by Turtle Entertainment and Volkswagen to showcase the new Scirocco in Leipzig Games Convention in 2008. A competition using LFS was held and the prize was a real Volkswagen Scirocco car. The Scirocco release for Live for Speed had been scheduled for 19 December 2008, however it has been delayed indefinitely due to unexpected fatal flaws in the latest patch and with the Scirocco itself, forcing the LFS team to remake the suspension system and tire physics.

== LFSWorld ==
LFS integrates with LFSWorld.net, a real-time comprehensive statistics website and database with an online skin support. Each racer's online race statistics are collected including per-lap personal bests, lap counts, distances traveled, and the amount of fuel burnt. Users can view other racers' stats and download their hotlaps as well. Also included is a database of community formed teams. Additionally, there is an official world record lap time chart, where racers can upload hotlaps, which exists per track and car. Users may also upload custom car skins to the website, from where the skins then are automatically downloaded as needed in-game to other players.

== Reception ==
=== Critical reception ===
The original Live for Speed was a nominee for PC Gamer US's 2003 "Best Racing Game" award, which ultimately went to NASCAR Racing 2003 Season. A writer for the magazine called Live for Speed evidence that "accurate driving physics and fun, accessible racing action can co-exist in the same game".

PC Gameworld's 2003 review of Live for Speed S1 by Walter Hurdle scored 89% and said: "A very strong simulation that offers fun and a high level of realism."

Justin Kranzl of APC magazine called the S1 release "the best PC racing simulator ever".

Pelit magazine's 2004 review of LFS' S1 release by Mika Äärilä scored 92/100 and said: "Saloon cars and meticulous simulation. Absolute cream of the crop."

Bytesector.com's 2005 review of S2 release said: "Nothing short of going to a track actually compares to the experience. Live for Speed is, by far, the most intense and demanding game I've ever played."

=== Awards ===
In 2005, AutoSimSport magazine gave LFS their "Best simulation" award and Blackhole Motorsports website readers voted to give LFS the following awards:

- BHM "Game of the Year" award
- BHM "Best Multiplayer" award
- BHM "Best Physics" award
- BHM "Surprise of the Year" award
