= NASCAR Rivals =

2022 racing video game

- The game's cover, featuring Kyle Busch, Alex Bowman, Ross Chastain, Joey Logano, and Denny Hamlin
- Developer: Motorsport Games
- Publisher: Motorsport Games
- Platform: Nintendo Switch
- Release: October 14, 2022
- Genre: Racing
- Modes: Single-player, multiplayer

NASCAR Rivals is a racing video game simulating the 2022 NASCAR Cup Series season. It was developed by Motorsport Games and was released on October 14, 2022 exclusively for the Nintendo Switch.

== Gameplay ==
=== Features ===
In a press release, Motorsport Games announced numerous features to the game, among preexisting features from old games. In the release, Motorsport Games would promise "a variety of different modes" including a career mode, a challenge mode where the player plays out certain scenarios in NASCAR races, and a "race now" mode that allows the player to race any track in the game with any driver. In addition, Motorsport Games also promised an enhanced paint booth for custom cars and three forms of multiplayer: split screen, online multiplayer with 16 players, and a local multiplayer with eight players.

== Release ==
On July 23, 2022, Motorsport Games-owned video game site Traxion announced that Amazon had a listing for a new video game from Motorsport Games on sale called "NASCAR Rivals".

In a press release on August 17, 2022, Motorsport Games officially announced the game would be released on October 14, 2022 with preorders starting on August 24. Motorsports Games also announced that gameplay of the game would be released on August 24.

== Promotion ==
On August 23, 2022, Motorsport Games would announce that NASCAR Rivals would become a primary sponsor for Live Fast Motorsports' No, 78 NASCAR Cup Series team at the 2022 Coke Zero Sugar 400.
