= 2020 24 Hours of Le Mans Virtual =

2020 sim racing esports event

Layout of the Circuit de la Sarthe

The 2020 24 Hours of Le Mans Virtual was an esports 24-hour automobile endurance race for Le Mans Prototype (LMP) and Le Mans Grand Touring Endurance (LMGTE) vehicles held on a simulated version of the Circuit de la Sarthe from 13 to 14 June 2020. The Automobile Club de l'Ouest, the FIA World Endurance Championship and Motorsport Games organised the race as a placeholder for the 2020 24 Hours of Le Mans that was postponed from June to September as a result of the impact of the COVID-19 pandemic in France. It was hosted on the rFactor 2 gaming platform and operated from Paris' Studio Gabriel. The race featured 50 teams of four drivers each sharing one car. The entry list was divided into two categories of vehicles: LMP and GTE. There were 30 teams in the LMP class and 20 in the GTE category.

An Oreca 07 car shared by Tom Dillmann, Esteban Guerrieri, Jernej Simončič and Jesper Pedersen for the ByKolles – Burst Esports team qualified on pole position after Simončič set the quickest qualifying lap. The team led the first six laps until it served a drive-through penalty in the pit lane because of a jump start by Dillmann. E-Team WRT's Fabrice Cornelis, Arne Schoonvliet, Kelvin van der Linde and Dries Vanthoor held the lead before van der Linde lost his internet connection. The Veloce Esports 2, 2 Seas Motorsport, Team Redline and Rebellion Williams Esports entries shared the lead until hour ten. Rebellion Williams Esports' No. 1 and 13 cars exchanged first position through pit stop rotation until ByKolles returned to battle for the win. Rebellion's No. 1 car of Jakub Brzezinski, Louis Delétraz, Raffaele Marciello and Nikodem Wisniewski conserved enough fuel to win by 17.781 seconds over ByKolles in second. Rebellion's No. 13 crew of Jack Aitken, Agustín Canapino, Marc Gassner and Michael Romanidis were third.

The Porsche Esports Team of Ayhancan Güven, Tommy Østgaard. Joshua Rogers and Nick Tandy qualified on pole position in the GTE category after Rogers set qualifying's fastest class lap. Loek Hartrog took the category lead for the Dempsey-Proton Racing team by passing Tandy at the start and maintained it until the R8G Esports crew of Mathias Beche, Erhan Jajovski. Daniel Juncadella and Risto Kappet moved into the position. R8G exchanged the class lead between Porsche before the latter crew took first position and maintained it for 261 consecutive laps to win in GTE. Aston Martin Racing's Manuel Biancolilla, Lasse Sørensen, Nicki Thiim and Richard Westbrook finished one lap behind in second and R8G was third following two accidents involving the crew during the event. The race was broadcast worldwide online and on television. It was watched by a worldwide audience of 14.2 million television viewers and 8.6 million online views.

== Background ==
The 2020 24 Hours of Le Mans was postponed from its scheduled dates of 13 and 14 June to 19 and 20 September as a result of the impact of the COVID-19 pandemic in France. In place of the postponed race, the automotive group the Automobile Club de l'Ouest (ACO), the FIA World Endurance Championship (WEC) and Motorsport Games elected to organise a simulation event called the 24 Hours of Le Mans Virtual rendering the 13.626 km (8.467 mi) Circuit de la Sarthe on the rFactor 2 gaming platform on the original dates. The event received support from developers Studio 397; its sponsor was the Saudi Arabian Federation for Electronic and Intellectual Sports initiative.

=== Rules ===
Each team had four drivers in their lineup. They were required to sign at least two professional drivers holding an international Fédération Internationale de l'Automobile (FIA) or equivalent racing licence with the last two being either sim racers or professional competitors. Each driver was limited to a minimum of four hours race time and could do no more than seven; they were not allowed to drive for more than three hours in a five-hour period otherwise race officials could impose a penalty on the squad if appropriate. No driver could race more than one car. Pit stops for fuel, tyres and driver switches were mandatory. Drivers had to participate in at least one of three test races for game, rules and procedure acclimatisation and set a minimum of ten laps in either a test session or test race. Drivers competed remotely from various locations around the world.

FIA WEC race director Eduardo Freitas officiated the event. Each driver was required to know the sporting regulations and attend a compulsory video briefing the day before the event. Race organisers nominated one or more drivers of the LMPH2G hydrogen safety car deployable at the race director's digression and participants would be told via voice chat. Racing flags were used to inform drivers with blue flags telling them of a slower car and yellow flags to indicate an incident somewhere on the circuit. Race control could impose a full course yellow flag ordering competitors to slow to 60 km/h (37 mph) to enable circuit repairs or the clearing of an incident. Non-appealable penalties ranged from a drive-through penalty to disqualification. Any team disconnecting from the server would be penalised five minutes or six minutes if they needed to switch drivers.

=== Entry list and reserves ===
The Le Mans Prototype (LMP) and Grand Touring Endurance (GTE) classes were the two types of car used for the race. Every LMP class squad fielded an Oreca 07 car and GTE teams could select between the Aston Martin Vantage, the Chevrolet Corvette C7.R, the Ferrari 488 GTE and the Porsche 911 RSR. Car numbers in LMP ranged from 1 to 50 and between 51 and 99 in the GTE class. GTE cars were subject to a balance of performance by rFactor 2's developers to ensure better parity within the class. Michelin was the race's control tyre supplier.

The 50-car, 200 driver field was decided by a committee of esports and motor racing representatives to join "the best of racing teams and esports squads". Race organisers lowered the entry list limit from 62 to 50 cars because they wanted a stable and unstrained server. The entry list was released on 23 May 2020. Organisers received 85 entry requests between the event's launch and the day of the entry list's publication for 30 LMP and 20 GTE entries. In addition to the entries given for the race, ten teams were placed on a reserve list to replace any withdrawn invitations.

Teams came from series like FIA WEC, IMSA and esports. There were real-life racing drivers from the European Le Mans Series (such as Paul-Loup Chatin and Katherine Legge), Formula One (including Max Verstappen and Lando Norris), FIA Formula 2 Championship (like Jack Aitken and Louis Delétraz), Formula E (such as Jean-Éric Vergne and António Félix da Costa), IMSA (like Nick Tandy and Juan Pablo Montoya), IndyCar Series (such as Tony Kanaan and Simon Pagenaud), and the FIA WEC (including Gustavo Menezes and André Negrão) on the entry list.

=== Broadcasting ===
The race was broadcast live from Paris' Studio Gabriel on social media platforms and on various television channels in 58 different countries. It was broadcast across Europe and the Asia-Pacific on Eurosport and across Africa on SuperSport. In Europe, coverage was carried by RTBF in Belgium; TV 2 in Denmark; RTL GP in the Netherlands and ViaPlay in Scandinavia. ESPN broadcast the race throughout the United States as well as Australia, Brazil, the Caribbean, the Pacific Islands and Spanish-speaking Latin America. Discovery Velocity carried coverage in Canada; Sky Sport in New Zealand; Sony Entertainment Television in India and J Sports in Japan. The commentary crew consisted of Ben Constanduros and Martin Haven, with expert analysis by Tom Kristensen, Allan McNish and two esports commentators of Lewis McGlade and Chris McCarthy. The 25-hour broadcast had a television audience of 14.2 million and an online viewership of 8.6 million.

== Qualifying ==
All LMP and GTE teams partook in two separate 20-minute qualifying sessions on the evening of 12 June. The GTE class session was held first before LMP qualifying. The team with the fastest lap time in their category qualified on pole position with the slowest at the back of the order. Only one participant per car was allowed to qualify, although teams were permitted to switch drivers if required. Most teams had their sim drivers qualify their cars with six professional competitors doing so.

Sim driver Jernej Simončič driving the No. 4 ByKolles Burst Esport car set the initial pace with a 3 minutes, 23.683 seconds' time before improving by three-tenths of a second late on to a 3 minutes, 23.380 seconds and qualify his team on pole position in the LMP category. The team was joined on the LMP category grid's front row by E-Team WRT's No. 30 entry of Arne Schoonvliet, whose best lap recorded late in qualifying was two-tenths of a second slower than Simončič. Schoonvliet demoted Devin Braune's No. 33 2 Seas Motorsport car to third. The fastest of the four Rebellion Williams Esport entries was the fourth-placed No. 3 car of Jack Keithley, who was Simončič's closest challenger at the session's mid-point before losing time in the final third of the lap. The No. 20 Team Redline entry of team director Atze Kerkhof qualified fifth. Stoffel Vandoorne was the highest-qualifying professional driver in sixth for Veloce Esports' No. 16 squad. Sim drivers occupied seventh and eighth with Kevin Siggy's No. 38 Jota Team Redline entry ahead of Nikodem Wisniewski's No. 1 Rebellion Williams Esport car. Jota's sister No. 37 vehicle of Aleksi Uusi-Jaakkola was ninth with James Baldwin's No. 18 Veloce Esports car tenth.

Porsche led in GTE with four cars at the top of the category field. Joshua Rogers, the Porsche Esports Supercup championship winner, set the session's fastest lap of 3 minutes, 46.550 seconds to put the No. 93 Porsche Esports Team entry on pole position. His teammate Mitchell Dejong briefly occupied pole position in the final moments of qualifying for the sister No. 91 Porsche team before falling 0.632 seconds behind Rogers to second despite crossing the start/finish line in time enabling him to set another timed lap. Kevin van Dooren qualified the No. 88 Dempsey-Proton Racing car third in the final seconds of qualifying. Jeremy Boutelop driving the No. 93 entry took fourth to be the third driver representing the Porsche Esport Team in the first four positions. Lasse Sørensen of the No. 95 Aston Martin Racing squad was the highest-placed non-Porsche driver in fifth position. Rounding out the top ten starters were the sixth-placed David Williams for the No. 80 R8G Esports Team, Porsche Esport Team's No. 94 entry of Erhan Jajovski in seventh, Nicky Catsburg's No. 63 Corvette Racing car in eighth, Enzo Bonito's No. 52 Ferrari - AF Corse vehicle in ninth and the tenth-placed No. 57 Team Project 1 entry of Zbigniew Siara.

=== Qualifying results ===
Pole position winners in each of the two classes are indicated in bold.

Final qualifying classification
Pos	Class	No.	Team	Car	Time	Gap
**1**	**LMP**	**04**	**ByKolles – Burst eSport**	**Oreca 07**	**3:23.380**	—
2	LMP	30	E-Team WRT	Oreca 07	3:23.603	+0.223
3	LMP	33	2 Seas Motorsport	Oreca 07	3:23.800	+0.420
4	LMP	03	Rebellion Williams Esports	Oreca 07	3:23.905	+0.525
5	LMP	20	Team Redline	Oreca 07	3:23.971	+0.591
6	LMP	16	Veloce eSports 2	Oreca 07	3:23.973	+0.593
7	LMP	38	Jota Team Redline	Oreca 07	3:24.027	+0.647
8	LMP	01	Rebellion Williams Esports	Oreca 07	3:24.089	+0.709
9	LMP	37	Jota Team Redline	Oreca 07	3:24.154	+0.774
10	LMP	18	Veloce Esports 3	Oreca 07	3:24.186	+0.806
11	LMP	09	Panis Racing Triple A	Oreca 07	3:24.313	+0.933
12	LMP	46	TDS E Racing Motul	Oreca 07	3:24.326	+0.946
13	LMP	14	FA/RB Allinsports	Oreca 07	3:24.357	+0.977
14	LMP	13	Rebellion Williams Esports	Oreca 07	3:24.399	+1.019
15	LMP	15	Multimatic Zansho	Oreca 07	3:24.636	+1.256
16	LMP	17	IDEC Sport Racing	Oreca 07	3:24.696	+1.316
17	LMP	08	Toyota Gazoo Racing	Oreca 07	3:24.755	+1.375
18	LMP	07	Toyota Gazoo Racing	Oreca 07	3:24.802	+1.422
19	LMP	24	Veloce Esports 1	Oreca 07	3:24.911	+1.531
20	LMP	02	Rebellion Williams Esports	Oreca 07	3:24.930	+1.550
21	LMP	23	Team Rocket Zansho	Oreca 07	3:25.024	+1.644
22	LMP	10	Toyota Gazoo Racing Argentina	Oreca 07	3:25.257	+1.877
23	LMP	50	Richard Mille Racing Team	Oreca 07	3:25.588	+2.208
24	LMP	31	Panis Racing Triple A	Oreca 07	3:26.034	+2.654
25	LMP	36	Signatech Alpine Elf	Oreca 07	3:26.363	+2.983
26	LMP	21	Axle Motorsport	Oreca 07	3:26.421	+3.041
27	LMP	06	Team Penske	Oreca 07	3:26.422	+3.042
28	LMP	22	United Autosports	Oreca 07	3:26.600	+3.220
29	LMP	12	MPI-Zansho	Oreca 07	3:26.642	+3.262
30	LMP	42	Cool Racing	Oreca 07	3:27.548	+4.168
**31**	**GTE**	**93**	**Porsche Esports Team**	**Porsche 911 RSR**	**3:46.550**	**+23.170**
32	GTE	91	Porsche Esports Team	Porsche 911 RSR	3:47.182	+23.802
33	GTE	88	Dempsey-Proton Racing	Porsche 911 RSR	3:47.819	+24.439
34	GTE	92	Porsche Esports Team	Porsche 911 RSR	3:47.864	+24.489
35	GTE	95	Aston Martin Racing	Aston Martin Vantage GTE	3:47.992	+24.612
36	GTE	80	R8G Esports Team	Chevrolet Corvette C7.R	3:48.108	+24.728
37	GTE	94	Porsche Esports Team	Porsche 911 RSR	3:48.213	+24.833
38	GTE	63	Corvette Racing	Chevrolet Corvette C7.R	3:48.704	+25.324
39	GTE	52	Ferrari - AF Corse	Ferrari 488 GTE	3:48.717	+25.337
40	GTE	57	Project 1 Motorsport	Porsche 911 RSR	3:48.897	+25.517
41	GTE	86	Gulf Racing	Porsche 911 RSR	3:48.931	+25.551
42	GTE	51	Ferrari - AF Corse	Ferrari 488 GTE	3:49.058	+25.678
43	GTE	97	Aston Martin Racing	Aston Martin Vantage GTE	3:49.096	+25.716
44	GTE	67	Mahle Racing Team	Aston Martin Vantage GTE	3:49.209	+25.829
45	GTE	64	Corvette Racing	Chevrolet Corvette C7.R	3:49.370	+25.990
46	GTE	99	Feed Racing	Chevrolet Corvette C7.R	3:49.733	+26.353
47	GTE	98	Aston Martin Racing	Aston Martin Vantage GTE	3:49.754	+26.374
48	GTE	71	Ferrari - AF Corse	Ferrari 488 GTE	3:49.989	+26.609
49	GTE	54	Strong Together	Ferrari 488 GTE	3:50.307	+26.927
50	GTE	56	Project 1 Motorsport	Porsche 911 RSR	3:55.078	+31.696

== Race ==
=== Start and opening hours ===
The race occurred from 15:00 Central European Time (UTC+02:00) on 13 June until the same time the following day. Former professional basketball player Tony Parker waved the French tricolor to begin the proceedings, led by Tom Dillmann's pole sitting No. 4 ByKolles car. Dillmann led the first six laps before he was required to serve a drive-through penalty for being adjudged to have jumped the start. The ByKolles team was demoted to 17th after serving the penalty and promoted E-Team WRT's Kelvin van der Linde to the race lead, closely followed by Vandoorne's No. 16 Veloce Esports 2 car in second position. He had overtaken Verstappen for Team Redline at about 50 minutes. The No. 14 FA/RB Allinsports car of Fernando Alonso progressed from 13th to 10th position before he and Simona de Silvestro's No. 94 Porsche collided at Tetre Rouge turn after half an hour. This had entailed a one-second stop-and-go penalty for Alonso before he made a subsequent pit stop for repairs lasting 30 minutes, dropping the entry ten laps behind the overall race leader. Porsche held sway in the GTE category, with the No. 88 Dempsey-Proton Racing entry of Loek Hartog overtaking his teammate Tandy driving the No. 93 car in the first stint and leading him by ten seconds at the first hour's conclusion.

Vandoorne in Veloce Esports' 2 No. 16 car took the lead and Norris driving Team Redline's No. 20 entry moved to second because van der Linde lost his internet connection. Van Der Linde was able to reconnect, but WRT's No. 30 crew returned to the race in 26th place. Just before the conclusion of the second hour's halfway point, the No. 14 FA/RB Allinsports entry of Alonso, that had dropped out of contention because of damage and the penalty, stopped on the circuit entering the Mulsanne corner with no fuel. This resulted from no fuel being added to the car because the game's software prevented Alonso from changing his pitstop settings and dictating he serve the penalty inside the pit lane. R8G Esports and Porsche Esports Team became involved in a duel for the lead in the GTE category. Hartog relinquished the No. 88 Dempsey-Proton Racing car's lead of the GTE it had maintained for much of the first two hours to Jajovski's R8G entry. Tommy Østgaard moved the No. 93 Porsche past Hartrog for second in GTE and took the lead by braking later than Jajovski into Mulsanne turn mid-way through hour three. Jajovski executed an identical pass on Østgaard not long after but Østgaard retook the lead into Indianapolis corner.

José María López was one of the fastest LMP drivers and brought the No. 7 Toyota Gazoo Racing team to third overall before co-driver Kamui Kobayashi drove the car and received a drive-through penalty for an incident. Esteban Guerrieri relieved Dillimann at ByKolles and returned the team to fourth position. The race lead became a battle between Norris' No. 20 Team Redline entry and later Atze Kerkhof and Braune's No. 33 2 Seas Motorsport car with the lead changing several times over the following two hours. Towards the end of the fifth hour, the event was stopped with a red flag by race control because of a technical fault with the computer systems. Every team received a radio message telling them to stop their cars behind the leader before the timing line. This gave yet-to-pit teams the opportunity to receive a fresh set of tyres and fuel when the race restarted prior to the six-hour mark. The delay enabled the No. 14 FA/RB car's reinstatement to the race at the rear of the LMP order. This ensured all 50 starting cars were still actively racing.

The 2 Seas team were able to nullify the lead of the No. 20 Team Redline entry from 20 seconds to nothing as Mathias Beche's R8G entry returned to the top of the GTE category with Catsburg's No. 63 Corvette second and Ayhancan Güven's No. 93 Porsche third as a result of the timing of the car's pit stop. At the restart, Güven overtook Catsburg at Mulsanne turn for second and Beche on the inside into the first right-handed corner for the GTE class lead in the No. 93 Porsche. Rory MacDuff's 2 Seas car led the No. 20 Team Redline entry of Greger Huttu in second by one second with the No. 4 ByKolles car of Jesper Pedersen eight seconds behind in third after six hours. Pedersen recorded a series of fast lap times to return to the overall lead, just before a brief safety car intervention following an accident for an LMP car into the Porsche Curves. He battled Vandoorne's No. 16 Veloce Esports 2 entry and Huttu's No. 20 Team Redline car for the lead until a simulation rig failure caused him to turn right and hit the Corvette turn barrier, (Note: Jasper Pedersen's issues had him steer right in order to go left.) dropping the ByKolles team to 11th overall.

=== Evening to morning ===
As virtual night fell, Verstappen took over driving the No. 20 Team Redline entry from Huttu and was gaining on the Veloce Esports 2 car now driven by Eamonn Murphy until the No. 51 AF Corse Ferrari misjudged the entry to its pit box and impeded Verstappen's pit lane exit, causing a collision with the No. 21 Axle Motorsports vehicle. Charles Leclerc had an anxious moment when he lost control of the No. 52 AF Corse car on a kerb into Tetre Rouge corner just after beginning his second driving stint because of a glitch and fell to fourth in GTE. During the ninth hour, Verstappen was able to take the race lead for Team Redline when Murphy collided with a GTE vehicle. Murphy's unscheduled pit stop elevated Aitken's No. 13 Rebellion car to second and Oliver Rowland's 2 Seas entry to third. Raffaele Marciello was lapping faster than the cars ahead of him and moved the No. 1 Rebellion car into second place, past both Rowland and Aitken on about 8 1/2 hours. Mariello was able to draw to within one second of Verstappen within 40 minutes.

On the tenth hour, server glitching problems lowered Verstappen's frame rate, causing him to hit the barrier off-track at Arnage corner. He lost control of his car at high-speed in the Porsche Curves and had a second accident. The damage inflicted to Verstappen's car from both crashes necessitated his entrance to the pit lane for repairs. This elevated Maricello's No. 1 Rebellion entry to first position and Rowland's 2 Seas car to second. Kerkhof relieved Verstappen driving the No. 20 Team Redline entry, but further technical issues caused the car to be driven by artificial intelligence before becoming the event's first official retirement just before half distance. Marciello and later Delétraz's No. 1 Rebellion entry led 2 Seas' Abdulla Al-Khalifa before the latter was slower and fell to fourth behind Atiken's No. 13 Rebellion vehicle and Pedersen's out-of-sync No. 4 ByKolles car. Porsche continued to lead the GTE category by nearly half-a-lap ahead of the second-placed R8G team that was recovering from an earlier collision with Legge's Richard Mille Racing LMP car at the second Mulsanne Straight chicane.

There were two further official retirements reducing the field to 47 cars in the 12th hour. The No. 94 Porsche lost one of its wheels in an accident at Karting corner and was unable to continue since no other driver was available following the completion of repairs. Toyota Gazoo Racing Argentina's No. 10 car went off the circuit in the Porsche Curves and retired from the race. Maricello continued to lead outright, only forfeiting the position of Rebellion's No. 1 vehicle temporarily to Michael Romanidis and Marc Gassner's sister No. 13 entry at pit stops. Keithley's No. 3 Rebellion entry lost fourth position to Braune's 2 Seas car before regaining the position in the next pit stop cycle. In the GTE class, there was a battle for fourth position between Sørensen's No. 95 Aston Martin and Dejong's No. 92 Porsche. Sørensen held off Dejong for several laps before Dejong overtook him at Indianapolis turn.

Rebellion had two anxious moments in the early morning. Menezes lost control of the No. 2 car at the final chicane and rejoined ahead of his teammate Keithley, who was battling Braune. While Braune cut the chicane and received no car damage, Menezes protruded into Keithley's path and he collided side on with Menezes. The No. 3 car sustained heavy damage and Keithley was required to complete a full lap as the incident occurred after the pit lane entry, dropping him to sixth. A drive-through penalty was imposed on Wisniewski for pit lane speeding, lowering the gap to Keithley to 40 seconds. Porsche relinquished its hold on the first three places in GTE when the No. 91 car lost a lap to Tandy's class-leading No. 93 entry in the pit lane because André Lotterer could not connect and required Neel Jani's services for a longer additional stint. On 19 hours, the race was stopped for the second time for half an hour to rectify server problems and every driver stopped on the grid. The stoppage enabled the return of the No. 20 Team Redline entry to the race and it was put 18 laps down at the rear of the LMP field.

The stoppage saw Wisniewski's 1 1/2 minute lead shrink to less than 20 seconds ahead of the second-placed Pedersen. Aitken had brought the No. 13 Rebellion team into the pit lane before the stoppage and was third as a result. In GTE, Tandy's 2 1/2 minute gap over Risto Kappet's R8G car was reduced to 30 seconds as he was the only driver on the same lap as the class leader. Sim racers assumed driving duties entering the event's final stages. Following the resumption of racing, Jakub Brzezinski had relieved Wisniewski driving the No. 1 Rebellion vehicle and increased the car's lead to 33 seconds. Gassner returned the No. 13 Rebellion entry to second place and maintained it until Pedersen lapped faster and reclaimed the position for the ByKolles squad by slipstreaming past Gassner, leaving Tetre Rouge corner at the beginning of the 21st hour. Late in the hour, Simončič took over from Pedersen, but ByKolles lost second when Gassner passed Pedersen on the outside at a high-speed kink before Indianapolis turn.

=== Afternoon to finish ===
The No. 92 Porsche held third position in GTE until just before the 23rd hour's end, when the team experienced a server connection problem causing a disconnection dropping the car down the class order. During the final hour, the Rebellion team decided they had the incorrect strategy and opted to conserve fuel usage by switching off the engines on occasion and relying heavily on slipstream. Both of the Rebellion entries made their pit stops for fuel with 37 minutes left for the race's final stint. This promoted the ByKolles team to the lead for one lap before Rebellion's cars returned to first and second when Simončič made a pit stop. Wisniewski led Simončič by 23 seconds and was conserving fuel to prevent the need for another pit stop. With 22 minutes remaining, Simončič's ByKolles entry used the extra fuel in his car to pressure Romanidis' No. 13 Rebellion vehicle into making an error at the Dunlop chicane and moved to second position. Romanidis was able to retake second position by slipstreaming past Simončič on the same lap. Not long after, Simončič overtook Romandidis through the Porsche Curves to retake second and was left to draw closer to Wisniewski.

Wisniewski was unhindered and finished first for the No. 1 Rebellion team to give him Brzezinski, Delétraz and Marciello overall victory in a time of 24 hours, 30.007 seconds after 371 laps. ByKolles' No. 4 crew of Dillmann, Guerrieri, Simončič and Pedersen finished 17.781 seconds later in second and Rebellion's No. 13 team of Aitken. Agustín Canapino, Gassner and Romanidis finished third a further 5.203 seconds behind. Just after finishing the race, Wisniewski stopped with no fuel and was pushed back to the pit lane by another vehicle. The 2 Seas Motorsport team of Isa Bin Abdulla Al-Khalifa, Braune, MacDuff and Rowland were fourth after Braune's pass on Jarno Opmeer with six minutes to go demoting the Veloce Esports 2 team of Pierre Gasly, Isaac Gillissen, Opmeer and Vergne to fifth. On the 50th anniversary of Porsche's first overall Le Mans win in 1970, the No. 93 car of Güven, Rogers, Østgaard and Tandy was undaunted since the seventh hour and maintained the lead the car had held for 261 consecutive laps to win the GTE category. Tandy became the first driver to win the actual and virtual 24 Hours of Le Mans. Aston Martin finished second with the No. 95 crew of Manuel Biancolilla, Sørensen, Nicki Thiim and Richard Westbrook one lap behind. They were 1 minute, 20 seconds ahead of the third-placed R8G crew of Beche, Jajovski, Daniel Juncadella and Kappet after their car needed repairs in the pit lane as a result of the No. 71 AF Corse Ferrari putting it into the wall on the Mulsanne Straight.

== Post-race ==
Delétraz credited Wisniewski's "extreme" fuel conservation enabling Rebellion's win, adding: "I will not have been able to do that, but Niko did it. He did really well, and we finished with 0.5 litres of fuel on the line, so we couldn't even do the in-lap. I've never been so happy after a sim race or even after a real race because it was an epic event." He described the event as "one of the longest nights of my life and the longest two hours" and added it would help him to prepare for the actual 24 Hours of Le Mans later in 2020. Although he was initially apprehensive about competing with professional drivers, Wisniewski praised Delétraz's and Marciello's work ethic: "With the professional drivers, they did a really nice job. At the beginning, of course, I thought okay we need to share the car with two pro drivers so that's going to be tricky, maybe they will be slow, and we want to achieve the best result." Dillmann said it was good for ByKolles to be duelling and to showcase the team's work. He believed Simončič's pace throughout longer stints gave them the advantage over the No. 13 Rebellion entry. Although he was happy to win the GTE class, Tandy commented that sim racing was not his speciality but the competition aspect and Porsche's racing methodology was the same.

Driver and media reaction to the 24 Hours of Le Mans Virtual was positive. Graham Goodwin of DailySportsCar wrote: "The event had real worth in many areas, will certainly have brought new viewers and fans to both virtual and real-world racing. It will have given some very big names the opportunity to experience just a little of the unique spirit of endurance racing too. That may have some significant pay-offs in the years to come." Autosport's Josh Suttill said the event "managed to encapsulate that once in a year feeling of the real-life event with this virtual race and, although not without problems, it felt like a fitting climax to over three months of intense sim racing action as real-world motorsport begins its gradual return in Europe" and it "was its own thrilling standalone historic motorsport event that has only heightened the excitement for the real-life Le Mans to return in September". Gasly, Güven and Leclerc said they would like to compete in the actual 24 Hours of Le Mans in the future.

In September 2020, the 24 Hours of Le Mans Virtual was named the recipient of the Live Experience Award at the Leaders Sports Awards. The race was voted the winner of the Autosport Pioneering and Engineering Award at the Autosport Awards in December 2020. In the same month, the 24 Hours of Le Mans Virtual won the VCO Simmy Award for Best Event as voted for by a jury and public vote. It was nominated and voted the winner of the Best Use of Esports by a Sports Brand Award at the Sports Technology Awards. The edition was shortlisted in the Esports category for the European Sponsorship Awards.

=== Race classification ===
Class winners are denoted in bold.

Final race results
Pos	Class	No.	Team	Drivers	Car	Engine	Laps	Time/Retired
1	**LMP**	**1**	(Switzerland) **Rebellion Williams eSports**	(Switzerland) **Louis Delétraz** (Italy) **Raffaele Marciello** (Poland) **Nikodem Wisniewski** (Poland) **Jakub Brzezinski**	Oreca 07	Gibson	371	24:00:30.007
2	LMP	4	(Austria) ByKolles – Burst eSport	(France) Tom Dillmann (Argentina) Esteban Guerrieri (Slovenia) Jernej Simončič (Denmark) Jesper Pedersen	Oreca 07	Gibson	371	+17.781
3	LMP	13	(Switzerland) Rebellion Williams eSports	(Argentina) Agustín Canapino (United Kingdom) Jack Aitken (Germany) Marc Gassner (Greece) Michael Romanidis	Oreca 07	Gibson	371	+22.984
4	LMP	33	(Bahrain) 2 Seas Motorsport	(Bahrain) Isa Bin Abdullah Al-Khalifa (United Kingdom) Oliver Rowland (United States) Rory MacDuff (Germany) Devin Braune	Oreca 07	Gibson	370	+1 Lap
5	LMP	24	(France) Veloce eSports 1	(France) Jean-Éric Vergne (France) Pierre Gasly (Netherlands) Jarno Opmeer (Netherlands) Isaac Gillissen	Oreca 07	Gibson	370	+1 Lap
6	LMP	3	(Switzerland) Rebellion Williams eSports	(China) Ye Yifei (France) Arthur Rougier (United Kingdom) Isaac Price (United Kingdom) Jack Keithley	Oreca 07	Gibson	370	+1 Lap
7	LMP	30	(Belgium) E-Team WRT	(Belgium) Dries Vanthoor (South Africa) Kelvin van der Linde (Belgium) Fabrice Cornelis (Belgium) Arne Schoonvliet	Oreca 07	Gibson	369	+2 Laps
8	LMP	46	(France) TDS E Racing Motul	(Netherlands) Larry ten Voorde (Netherlands) Giedo van der Garde (Germany) Alex Siebel (Germany) Dennis Jordan	Oreca 07	Gibson	369	+2 Laps
9	LMP	23	(United Kingdom) Team Rocket Zansho	(United Kingdom) Jenson Button (United Kingdom) Alex Buncombe (Germany) Jan von der Heyde (United Kingdom) Matthew Richards	Oreca 07	Gibson	369	+2 Laps
10	LMP	17	(France) IDEC Sport Racing	(France) Paul-Loup Chatin (United Kingdom) Richard Bradley (Argentina) Franco Colapinto (Germany) Michi Hoyer	Oreca 07	Gibson	369	+2 Laps
11	LMP	8	(Japan) Toyota Gazoo Racing	(Switzerland) Sébastien Buemi (New Zealand) Brendon Hartley (Japan) Kenta Yamashita (Netherlands) Yuri Kasdorp	Oreca 07	Gibson	368	+3 Laps
12	LMP	31	(France) Panis Racing Triple A	(France) Tristan Vautier (France) Nico Jamin (Netherlands) Hany Alsabti (France) Thibault Cazaubon	Oreca 07	Gibson	368	+3 Laps
13	LMP	16	(Belgium) Veloce eSports 2	(France) Norman Nato (Belgium) Stoffel Vandoorne (Republic of Ireland) Eamonn Murphy (Poland) Tomek Poradzisz	Oreca 07	Gibson	368	+3 Laps
14	LMP	7	(Japan) Toyota Gazoo Racing	(United Kingdom) Mike Conway (Japan) Kamui Kobayashi (Argentina) José María López (France) Maxime Brient	Oreca 07	Gibson	367	+4 Laps
15	LMP	38	(United Kingdom) Jota Team Redline	(Portugal) António Félix da Costa (Sweden) Felix Rosenqvist (Netherlands) Rudy van Buren (Slovenia) Kevin Siggy	Oreca 07	Gibson	366	+5 Laps
16	LMP	37	(United Kingdom) Jota Team Redline	(United Kingdom) Will Stevens (France) Gabriel Aubry (Finland) Aleksi Uusi-Jaakkola (Germany) Dominik Farber	Oreca 07	Gibson	366	+5 Laps
17	LMP	14	(Spain) FA/RB Allinsports	(Spain) Fernando Alonso (Brazil) Rubens Barrichello (Finland) Olli Pahkala (Norway) Jarl Teien	Oreca 07	Gibson	363	+8 Laps
18	LMP	2	(Switzerland) Rebellion Williams eSports	(United States) Gustavo Menezes (Brazil) Bruno Senna (Croatia) Petar Brljak (Poland) Dawid Mroczek	Oreca 07	Gibson	363	+8 Laps
19	LMP	50	(Switzerland) Richard Mille Racing Team	(United Kingdom) Katherine Legge (Colombia) Tatiana Calderón (Germany) Sophia Flörsch (Australia) Emily Jones	Oreca 07	Gibson	361	+10 Laps
20	LMP	12	(United States) MPI-Zansho	(Italy) Max Papis (Brazil) Pietro Fittipaldi (Brazil) Tony Kanaan (Netherlands) Sido Weijer	Oreca 07	Gibson	361	+10 Laps
21	LMP	42	(Switzerland) Cool Racing	(France) Nicolas Lapierre (Switzerland) Antonin Borga (France) Erwan Barbier (France) Maxime Scalabrini	Oreca 07	Gibson	359	+12 Laps
22	LMP	9	(France) Panis Racing Triple A	(France) Olivier Panis (France) Aurélien Panis (Hungary) Adam Pinczes (Portugal) Nuno Pinto	Oreca 07	Gibson	358	+13 Laps
23	LMP	15	(Canada) Multimatic Zansho	(United Kingdom) Andy Priaulx (United Kingdom) Sebastian Priaulx (United Kingdom) Mike Epps (Canada) Olivier Fortin	Oreca 07	Gibson	357	+14 Laps
24	LMP	22	(United Kingdom) United Autosports	(Portugal) Filipe Albuquerque (United Kingdom) Alex Brundle (Netherlands) Job van Uitert (United Kingdom) Tom Gamble	Oreca 07	Gibson	355	+16 Laps
25	LMP	20	(United Kingdom) Team Redline	(Netherlands) Max Verstappen (United Kingdom) Lando Norris (Netherlands) Atze Kerkhof (Finland) Greger Huttu	Oreca 07	Gibson	354	+17 Laps
26	LMP	36	(France) Signatech Alpine Elf	(France) Thomas Laurent (Brazil) André Negrão (France) Pierre Ragues (France) Nicolas Longuet	Oreca 07	Gibson	353	+18 Laps
27	LMP	6	(United States) Team Penske	(Colombia) Juan Pablo Montoya (France) Simon Pagenaud (United States) Dane Cameron (United States) Ricky Taylor	Oreca 07	Gibson	352	+19 Laps
28	LMP	21	(Malaysia) Axle Motorsport	(Malaysia) Alex Yoong (Malaysia) Alister Yoong (Malaysia) Muhammad Naquib (Malaysia) Mika Hakimi	Oreca 07	Gibson	350	+21 Laps
29	**GTE**	**93**	(Germany) **Porsche eSports Team**	(United Kingdom) **Nick Tandy** (Turkey) **Ayhancan Güven** (Australia) **Joshua Rogers** (Norway) **Tommy Østgaard**	**Porsche 911 RSR**	Porsche M97/80	**339**	**+32 Laps**
30	GTE	95	(United Kingdom) Aston Martin Racing	(Denmark) Nicki Thiim (United Kingdom) Richard Westbrook (Denmark) Lasse Sørensen (Italy) Manuel Biancolilla	Aston Martin Vantage GTE	Aston Martin 4V8T	338	+33 Laps
31	GTE	80	(France) R8G eSports Team	(Spain) Daniel Juncadella (Switzerland) Mathias Beche (North Macedonia) Erhan Jajovski (Estonia) Risto Kappet	Chevrolet Corvette C7.R	Chevrolet	337	+34 Laps
32	GTE	64	(United States) Corvette Racing	(United States) Tommy Milner (Denmark) Jan Magnussen (Denmark) Dennis Lind (Slovenia) Alen Terzic	Chevrolet Corvette C7.R	Chevrolet	337	+34 Laps
33	GTE	88	(Germany) Dempsey-Proton Racing	(Italy) Riccardo Pera (Netherlands) Loek Hartog (Italy) Michael Francesconi (Netherlands) Kevin van Dooren	Porsche 911 RSR	Porsche M97/80	337	+34 Laps
34	GTE	63	(United States) Corvette Racing	(United States) Jordan Taylor (Netherlands) Nick Catsburg (Germany) Alex Voss (Germany) Laurin Heinrich	Chevrolet Corvette C7.R	Chevrolet	335	+36 Laps
35	GTE	71	(Italy) Ferrari - AF Corse	(Spain) Miguel Molina (Italy) Federico Leo (Italy) Amos Laurito (Netherlands) Jordy Zwiers	Ferrari 488 GTE	Ferrari F154CB	335	+36 Laps
36	GTE	54	(Monaco) Strong Together	(Italy) Francesco Castellacci (Italy) Giancarlo Fisichella (Brazil) Felipe Massa (France) Tony Mella	Ferrari 488 GTE	Ferrari F154CB	335	+36 Laps
37	GTE	57	(Germany) Project 1 Motorsport	(Luxembourg) Dylan Pereira (Norway) Dennis Olsen (Germany) Tim Neuendorf (Poland) Zbigniew Siara	Porsche 911 RSR	Porsche M97/80	335	+36 Laps
38	GTE	98	(United Kingdom) Aston Martin Racing	(United Kingdom) Darren Turner (United Kingdom) Ross Gunn (United Kingdom) Jonathan Adam (Italy) Giuseppe di Fuoco	Aston Martin Vantage GTE	Aston Martin 4V8T	334	+37 Laps
39	GTE	92	(Germany) Porsche eSports Team	(New Zealand) Jaxon Evans (Australia) Matt Campbell (Netherlands) Mack Bakkum (France) Jeremy Bouteloup	Porsche 911 RSR	Porsche M97/80	333	+38 Laps
40	GTE	91	(Germany) Porsche eSports Team	(Germany) André Lotterer (Switzerland) Neel Jani (United States) Mitchell DeJong (Finland) Martti Pietilä	Porsche 911 RSR	Porsche M97/80	333	+38 Laps
41	GTE	99	(France) Feed Racing	(Belgium) Simon Pilate (France) Théo Pourchaire (France) Axel Petit (France) Alexandre Vromant	Chevrolet Corvette C7.R	Chevrolet	332	+39 Laps
42	GTE	97	(United Kingdom) Aston Martin Racing	(United Kingdom) Alex Lynn (Republic of Ireland) Charlie Eastwood (United Kingdom) Harry Tincknell (Italy) Tiziano Brioni	Aston Martin Vantage GTE	Aston Martin 4V8T	330	+41 Laps
43	GTE	51	(Italy) Ferrari - AF Corse	(Denmark) Nicklas Nielsen (South Africa) David Perel (Denmark) Kasper Stoltze (Italy) Matteo Caruso	Ferrari 488 GTE	Ferrari F154CB	328	+43 Laps
44	GTE	56	(Germany) Project 1 Motorsport	(Germany) Laurents Hörr (Germany) David Kolkmann (Germany) Dany Giusa (Germany) Lukas Müller	Porsche 911 RSR	Porsche M97/80	325	+46 Laps
45	GTE	67	(Germany) Mahle Racing Team	(Austria) Ferdinand Habsburg (Canada) Robert Wickens (United Kingdom) Jimmy Broadbent (Netherlands) Kevin Rotting	Aston Martin Vantage GTE	Aston Martin 4V8T	325	+46 Laps (Note: Entry had three laps deleted for exceeding maximum driving time.)
46	GTE	52	(Italy) Ferrari - AF Corse	(Monaco) Charles Leclerc (Italy) Antonio Giovinazzi (Italy) Enzo Bonito (Italy) David Tonizza	Ferrari 488 GTE	Ferrari F154CB	324	+47 Laps
47	GTE	86	(United Kingdom) Gulf Racing	(United Kingdom) Benjamin Barker (United Kingdom) Andrew Watson (Republic of Ireland) Adam Maguire (Italy) Eros Masciulli	Porsche 911 RSR	Porsche M97/80	324	+47 Laps
NC	LMP	18	(United Kingdom) Veloce eSports 3	(France) Sacha Fenestraz (United States) Ryan Tveter (United Kingdom) James Baldwin (France) Tom Lartilleux	Oreca 07	Gibson	297	Not Classified
NC	LMP	10	Toyota Gazoo Racing Argentina	(Brazil) Nelson Piquet Jr. (Argentina) Julián Santero (Italy) Fabrizio Gobbi (Italy) Moreno Sirica	Oreca 07	Gibson	188	Not Classified
NC	GTE	94	(Germany) Porsche eSports Team	(France) Patrick Pilet (Switzerland) Simona de Silvestro (Germany) Martin Krönke (United Kingdom) David Williams	Porsche 911 RSR	Porsche M97/80	166	Not Classified

== Notes ==
Awards
Preceded by W Series	Autosport; Pioneering and Innovation Award; 2020	Succeeded by Incumbent
