= RFpro =

Driving simulation software

rFpro
- rFpro logo
- Developer: rFpro Limited
- Initial release: 2007
- Engine: isiMotor 2
- Type: Simulation software
- License: Commercial software
- Website: rFpro Website

rFpro, originally rFactor Pro, is a driving simulation software used by professional motor racing teams, car manufacturers, and tier 1 suppliers for advanced driver-assistance systems, self-driving cars and vehicle dynamics. The software was a project created within an undisclosed Formula One team, using the code from Image Space Incorporated's racing simulator rFactor as a base, and was later made available for commercial release in 2007. It was originally developed for driver-in-the-loop simulations, but has since been used for autonomous vehicle training as well.

== History ==
Developed using the code Image Space Incorporated's racing simulator rFactor as a base, rFpro started as an internal project in 2007 within an undisclosed Formula One team and was later made available for commercial release. The software is developed by rFpro Limited, based in Wiltshire, England.

In 2017, rFpro Limited joined forces with Image Space Incorporated and acquired assets from their isiMotor physics engine and gMotor graphics engine, which it had been licensing for use in rFpro since its initial release. British solutions company AB Dynamics acquired rFpro Limited in 2019. In 2020, they partnered with German simulation company Cosin Scientific Software to enable FTire (flexible ring tire model) to run with rFpro. rFpro launched AV elevate in 2024, an integrated platform created for advanced driver-assistance systems and autonomous vehicle development.

A number of Formula One teams, past and present, use rFpro, including Alpine, Ferrari, Force India, Mercedes-AMG, and Sauber.

== Features ==
rFpro features a 120 Hz graphics engine, a library of high definition laser scanned tracks and roads, and an infrastructure in which users can plug their in-house vehicle physics through a Simulink or a C/C++ interface. Alternatively, rFpro's rigid multi-body physics engine can be used, which samples suspension and drive-train at 800 Hz. rFpro includes a tool called TerrainServer, which can feed the LiDAR data with a 1 cm resolution to a vehicle model running in real time up to 5 kHz.

The library includes digital reproductions of public roads, proving grounds, and laser-scanned racing circuits, some of which are locations used in major racing series including Formula One and Formula E.

In switching to rFpro for its simulator software in 2014, Scuderia Ferrari cited the high fidelity of the reproduced track surface, with an accuracy better than 1 millimetre in Z (height) and 1 centimetre in X and Y (position), which represented a ten-fold improvement over their previous solution. They also cited the ability to respond to dynamic inputs faster than the driver can detect.

== See also ==
- Modelica
- Powertrain
- rFactor
- rFactor 2
