= KartKraft =

2022 video game

- Developers: Motorsport Games; Black Delta
- Publisher: Motorsport Games
- Engine: Unreal Engine 4
- Platform: Microsoft Windows
- Release: January 26, 2022
- Genre: Racing
- Modes: Single-player, multiplayer

KartKraft is a 2022 karting racing simulator game that emphasizes realistic physics. It was originally created by Australian independent developer Black Delta which in 2021 was acquired by Motorsport Games. After being in early access on the Steam store since November 2018, the game was officially released as 1.0 on January 26, 2022.

== Development history ==
Early development on KartKraft was first teased in 2008, with a post to their Facebook page originally under the name "KartSim". The creator Zach Griffin, later in 2015 officially established the Black Delta studio and renamed the game to KartKraft. In March 2021 KartKraft developer Black Delta was acquired by Motorsport Games for $1 million USD, but in 2023 the studio was closed by Motorsport Games.

On January 28, 2025, a Cloud Authentication Server required by KartKraft to work stopped responding, rendering the game unplayable for all users. On February 4 The Cloud Authentication Server required by KartKraft to work was confirmed by Motorsports Games CEO that access would be restored.

== Features and content ==
At time of the 1.0 release KartKraft featured 7 officially licensed laser-scanned circuits, plus a fictional Hangar Track. Official tracks included: Whilton Mill circuit, Karting Genk, Atlanta Motorsports Park, The Geelong Kart Club, Go Kart Club of Victoria (GKCV, also in reverse configuration), PF International (PFI, also in the Classis layout), and the Brentomonte Circuit. Vehicles included the entry-level KA100, the intermediate X30, the advanced KZ2 gearbox kart, the Praga 600cc 'Monster' Kart, and the KartKross.

Online multiplayer support included a bespoke hopper matchmaking system, and was limited to practice sessions with collisions disabled and up to 25 players. Multiplayer (which never officially exited a 'beta' stage and was never an advertised feature on their Steam Store page) stopped working shortly after the November 2023 closure of the studio.

KartKraft uses the Unreal Engine and supports virtual reality, triple screen play, and full motion platforms.

== Reception ==
Reception

Review score
| Publication | Score |
|---|---|
| Hardcore Gamer | 2.5/5 |

Hardcore Gamer praised the accuracy of the simulation elements, but panned the title as a game.
