= RFactor 2 =

Computer racing simulator

rFactor 2
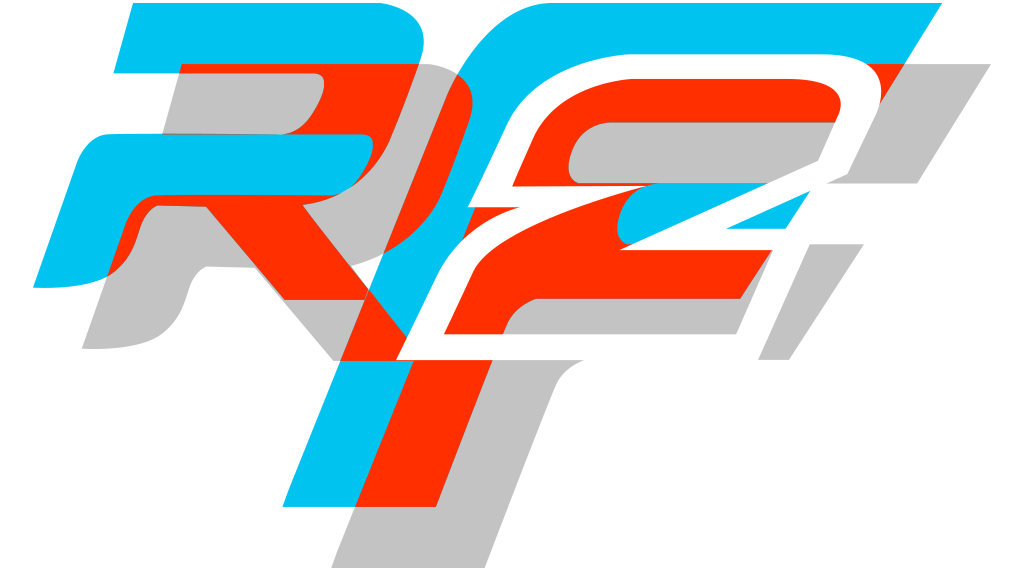
- Developers: Image Space Incorporated; Studio 397 (since 2016)
- Publishers: Image Space Incorporated; Motorsport Games (2021)
- Designer: Image Space Incorporated
- Engine: isiMotor 2.0
- Platform: Microsoft Windows
- Release: WW: 28 March 2013
- Genre: Racing simulation
- Modes: Single-player, multiplayer

rFactor 2 is a 2013 computer racing simulator developed by Image Space Incorporated (taken over by Studio 397 in 2016) and released for Windows in 2013. Like its predecessor rFactor, rFactor2 is designed to be modified and used by professional racing teams for driver training and race car development. Much of its source code is derived from rFactor Pro, which is also used by professional racers and most of the Formula One teams and NASCAR manufacturers.

rFactor 2 is designed to simulate any type of multi-wheeled vehicle of any era, including four-wheeled and six-wheeled vehicles with either two or four steered wheels. It features advanced physics, suspension, and tire model.

== Background ==
After the initial success of Sports Car GT (1999), Image Space Incorporated used its self-developed software engine Motor1 for several racing titles, including the Formula One simulators F1 2002 and F1 Challenge '99-'02. iMotor is an umbrella term that covers every component of the software engine, including the graphics engine gMotor and the physics engine Motor. After the release of F1 Challenge '99-'02, isiMotor was licensed to another company for the first time, SimBin, who went on to produce popular retail sim racing titles GTR and GTR 2.

Image Space Incorporated then made a racing simulator with open architecture and provided tools for the modding community to create third-party content. This title became rFactor, released in 2005, which was the first ISI title using the software engine referred to as isiMotor2.

isiMotor2 was further licensed to companies such as Slightly Mad Studios, Reiza Studios, and 2Pez Games. isiMotor2 also laid the foundation for rFactor Pro, a software simulation engine used by real-life racing teams and car manufacturers, including most of the current Formula One grid and NASCAR manufacturers. Image Space Incorporated took the experience from isiMotor2 and rFactor Pro and began the development of rFactor 2. From this point on, the software engine would be referred to as isiMotor2.5. rFactor 2 also incorporated code that was developed for rFpro. At the same time, rFpro continues to use the developments made by ISI to the rFactor codebase.

== Development ==
=== From announcement to open beta (2009–2012) ===
The public first became aware that the development of rFactor 2 was underway when Gjon Camaj of Image Space Incorporated posted WIP in-game screenshots on Twitter in early March 2009. Later that month, he revealed more details about the upcoming simulator alongside additional in-game screenshots. In October 2010, Camaj revealed in an extensive interview plans for including licensed content, a new reworked UI, inclusion of dynamic weather, new innovative dynamic racing surface technology, improvements to the AI logic, and a new force feedback system with lower input lag and much faster and more direct steering rack forces, similar to the popular third party developed RealFeel plug-in for rFactor.

By December 2011, more features were confirmed to be included in the then-upcoming open beta, including rain, wet/dry track transitions, dynamic track elements (groove/marbles), new tire model, new physics, and a new collision model. The first open beta (Test Build 49) was released on January 10, 2012. After the December 2012 release (Update 10, Build 134) Test Build 49 has been out of beta since early 2013, and the official Steam store page retrospectively listed it as released on March 28, 2013 (which corresponds to build 198).

=== Development by ISI after release (2013–2016) ===
Tire degradation was added with a beta build 146 in February 2013, along with other related tyre physics updates. In November 2014, a new build was released with a new tire contact patch physics, although it wasn't yet applied to any car.

Among the free content released with the game was the Corvette G6.R, Nissan GTR, Chevrolet Camaro GT3 (released in August 2013) and among the race tracks Silverstone and Lime Rock Park. Historical cars were later released for rFactor 2. In May 2014 the Formula Renault 3.5 was released, shortly followed by the Dallara DW12 and the Indianapolis Motor Speedway race track, the first oval content for rFactor 2. Some historical Indycar content was also released.

Between 2014 and 2015, ISI tasked Marcel Offermans from Dutch software company Luminis to bring rFactor to the Steam store, which was completed in March 2015. This was also done as an exploration for also bringing rFactor 2 to Steam, which effectively happened in November 2015. This led to Gjon Camaj, ISI's vice president, and Offermans discussing the possibility of Luminis taking over the development of rFactor 2, which was effectively announced the following year with the creation of Studio 397.

A non-Steam version of rFactor 2 continued to be available until May 2016. That month, an official physics development blog aimed at modders was launched, giving detailed information on the physics engine and how to create cars for rF2, including posts on the tire creation process.

=== Development moved from ISI to Studio 397 (2016) ===
At Simracing Expo held in September 2016, ISI announced a partnership with Dutch software company Luminis with the goal of bringing new features to the software. Luminis already had experience with racing simulators, having supported Reiza Studios in the development of Automobilista, which was based on rFactor siMulator 2 engine. This partnership brings the development of rFactor 2 to a new company called Studio 397, based in Apeldoorn. Studio 397 managing director Marcel Offermans stated that a lot of new features would be implemented in the game, including a more web-based UI, a DirectX 11 compatible graphics engine and the VR support for Oculus Rift and HTC Vive. Moreover, a new "paid-content system" would allow ISI to add more licensed content to the simulator.

The following month, Studio 397 released information about the new content. The developers revealed that they had acquired the license of U.S. F2000 National Championship, Radical Sportscars, and NOLA Motorsports Park. The new rFactor 2 version was available only on Steam. With their first build release in December, Studio 397 made online racing free to all users, removing the previous subscription fee model. In May 2017, the open beta for the new DirectX 11 graphics engine was released and became the default graphics engine later the same year, discontinuing support for DirectX 9. With DX11, support for Virtual Reality was introduced.

From July 2017, Studio 397 started to release a series of updates to the tyre model, starting with the Radical SR3 RSX, and continuing with a contact patch model (CPM) update in October of the same year. Later in December, a new build introduced an update to the tire contact patch model (CPM) physics, which developer Michael Borda deemed "the biggest change in rF2 since the introduction of the contact patch model" (which was with the 880 build back in 2014). The updated CPM was also available to modders, and was used in the 2018 version of the GP3 Series mod. In 2018, Studio 397 conducted tests at the Mechanopôle test track in Alès (France), in collaboration with Duqueine Engineering and Indy Lights and LMP2 driver Nicolas Jamin (which were using Michelin tires), to fine-tune physics and tire data for the LMP and GTE cars.

After the Le Mans 24 Hours Virtual in February 2020, Michelin stated that the tire wear rate in rFactor 2 was higher than in real life, and that they looked forward to working with Studio 397 to improve rF2 tire compounds on this aspect. Further physics updates were released in the same month, also based on feedback from 2017 World's Fastest Gamer winner Rudy van Buren.

In August 2017, Studio 397 released the first paid DLC for rFactor 2, with the McLaren 650S GT3, followed in October by a larger GT3 pack DLC. The following month, the first Formula E content was released. In March 2018, the KartSim DLC package was released, containing two go-karts and three tracks. The same year in February, Studio 297 finished data gathering for the first laser scanned track for rFactor 2 (Sebring), using Lidar technology. Later in 2018, Studio 397 released the Endurance package and several historical F1 cars (the Brabham BT44B, March 761, and McLaren M23, MP4/8 and MP4/13). In June 2019, the first six Tatuus-based cars were released. In 2019, with the addition of the 24 Hours of Le Mans and their version of the Circuit de Monaco, rF2 completed the full triple crown of tracks.

The user interface for rFactor and rFactor 2 had long been criticized for their graphic design. In December 2019, a new user interface, which had been anticipated and previewed for some time, was released as an opt-in public beta. It is entirely based on HTML to make it easier to extend and integrate with future online services. The new UI included a new matchmaker for online multiplayer and established the basis for the upcoming competition system, whose beta was released in December 2020.

=== Acquisition by Motorsport Games (2021) ===
In March 2021, Motorsport Games entered a deal with Luminis International for the acquisition of 100% share of Studio 397 and rFactor 2 for 16 million USD. The acquisition was completed two months later in May. Also that year in February, Motorsport Games acquired Black Delta, developer of KartKraft, for an undisclosed amount. After discontinuing its NASCAR Heat series, Motorsport Games used the rFactor 2 physics engine and the Unreal graphics engine for NASCAR 21: Ignition, launched in 2021. The combination of the rFactor and Unreal engines will be used for all titles produced by Motorsport Games, including the British Touring Car Championship and IndyCar Series games, both which were later canceled in 2023.

In July 2021, the Formula Pro car was released. The development of the tire physics of this car was based on a new collaboration with tire manufacturer Goodyear, who provided tire data. The updates to the tire model have since been brought to also other cars like the BMW M4 Class 1, and there is ongoing development to use such data and feedback from Goodyear to fix long standing rF2 issues, such as the undue performance advantage given by running minimum tire pressures.

=== Release candidate build of rFactor 2 (2022) ===
Studio 397 unveiled details on its forthcoming Q3 release candidate build of rFactor 2. The release candidate is an optional beta. April's Q2 release candidate gave the players better particle and sound effects, leading to enhanced sparks and better-sounding cars. It also introduced a powerful photo mode and made the release one of rFactor 2's most significant in recent times.

== Features ==
=== Physics ===
rFactor 2 and its predecessor have received much praise for their highly advanced and accurate simulation of vehicle dynamics and are the preferred simulator for most real-life professional racing teams, car engineers, and simulation centers. rFactor 2 is also used to train the drivers who win the Gran Turismo Academy competition. rFactor 2 includes a new constraint system that allows for advanced physics simulation such as chassis flex, which removes the normal/usual infinite rigidity of a virtual vehicle and incorporates unique chassis characteristics into the handling and performance of the car, as well as highly accurate suspension geometry and wheel rates.

Race Engineer Andrea Quintarelli stated: "It is also no surprise for me that most of these professional simulators (or centers) are using rFactor. As I had the chance to prove myself (and probably to somebody reading here), when you know how to properly build your models, rFactor is producing very accurate results, at a very low cost".

Petros Mak, the founder of the professional modding company Mak Corp, stated: "All our race team clients and even our series clients, they don't only use rFactor for track familiarization. They also use it to test setup data before they go to an event, they use it to test potential new part data, by developing new brakes or new engine performances and testing it in the game before they actually commit to building it in real life. rF1 and rF2 provide far higher accuracy for those things than any other simulation on the market... rFactor 2's physics engine is by far the most simulation-based physics engine using real-life aero and physical data that no other title has come close to".

==== Tire model ====
The interaction and collaboration between Image Space Incorporated and professional racing teams and their engineers using the ISI developed rFactor Pro platform has changed the new tire model used in rFactor 2. This has resulted in the ISI TGM Tyre Tool, a tool that is also available to third-party modders.

rFactor 2 is the first consumer simulation featuring a thermomechanical physically-based tire model, based on first principles, simulating the entire carcass, thread and contact patch, with proper heat transfer, accurate tire wear, flatspots, and visual deformation. It is also the first to feature truly dynamic track conditions.

Racers new to rFactor 2 are not used to having to manage their tires like in reality, therefore they tend to overdrive the car with too much steering input, resulting in overheating tires and excessive tire wear.

rFactor 2 also features realistic tire wear and damage. If a player locks up the brakes, a flat spot will occur with force feedback vibrations alongside a car imbalance due to the lost weight of the burnt off tire. Until the tires are changed during a pit stop, the car will feel imbalanced and uncomfortable to drive. Using bad driving techniques will punish the player with tires overheating and wearing unevenly. Tire punctures are also featured, though not visually represented in-game.

The tire model has also had longstanding limitations and issues, like the undue advantage given by running minimum pressures, the competitive advantage of excessively sliding all four tires to better rotate a car through a corner, and the racing line grip levels under wet conditions, which do not take into account that the rubbered track surface is more slippery when wet. Regarding minimum tire pressures in real life tires, the advantage given by an increased contact patch and grip is countered by side-effects like an increased risk of overheating the tires and an increased rolling resistance.

==== Real Road ====
Real Road is one of the most prominent features of rFactor 2. Rubber is dynamically laid on the track surface in real time during a race session by the player and the AI. The rubber can carry over to the next sessions. This calls for the player constantly having to adapt to the advancing track conditions during a race weekend. In a dry race weekend, this means more and more available grip throughout. The player can choose from various rubber presets to start with or just choose to start the weekend on a completely green track. Real Road can be accelerated, left at a normal rate, or be completely static. The feature also creates grip-affecting marbles outside of the normal racing line.

Real Road works together with wet weather. When rain hits the track, the previously built-up rubber and marbles are washed away and the track will need to be rubbered in again. The wet track surface dries similarly to the aforementioned rubber build-up due to both of the cars on the track, resulting in a drying line, as well as temperature, sun and wind. The Real Road system of rFactor 2 is unique because it is not scripted, but completely dynamic.

=== AI ===
The AI of rFactor 2 has spatial awareness, adjustable strength and aggression sliders, and the ability to "learn" more efficient racing lines around a track, resulting in faster lap times. The AI can also take control of the player's car. rFactor 2 is unique in that it is capable of races with over 100 AI opponents and players can mix AI opponents with real drivers during online multiplayer races.

=== Modding ===
rFactor 2 is designed specifically to be modified. It is the first race sim with a dedicated mod packaging system and with the Steam release is the first with Steam Workshop integration. Notable mods for rFactor 2 include the Endurance Series mod created by EnduRacers, the MP4/4, MP4/8, MP4/9 and Williams FW26 F1 cars created by the MAK-Corp modding team, the Formula 3 race car, the Pikes Peak Hillclimb, a LIDAR-scanned Laguna Seca, Mid-Ohio, and Highlands Motorsport Park.

=== Competition system ===
The Competition System was released in beta in December 2020. The "Linked Sessions" feature was introduced in July 2021. As of December 2021, the development of the Competition System beta is still ongoing, and it features some esports series including the BMW SIM M2 CS Racing Cup, the Formula Challenge and the GT Challenge. Planned features for the competition system include a protest system, and a form of ranked racing.

The main goals for the competition system are to provide daily races for multiple series, to have some sort of ranking system to match people of similar skills, support league racing, and an optional ladder path to progress through the ranks.

=== Other features ===
Also featured in rFactor 2 is a full day-to-night cycle with lighting transitions that can be set to real-time or accelerated. Fuel usage and visual as well as mechanical damage are also featured in the simulator, along with a "resume from replay" feature where any saved replay can be loaded and the player can then choose to resume driving at any point during that replay.

== Use in official esports events ==
Since 2014, rFactor 2 has also been used for the Formula SimRacing (FSR) World Championship organized by the International SimRacing Club (ISR Club).

From April to June 2020, rFactor 2 was used for the Formula E Race at Home Challenge.

rFactor 2 was used for the 24 Hours of Le Mans Virtual race on 14 June 2020, organized in collaboration with Motorsport Games. The race was red-flagged twice when the server had a problem and had to be restarted, drawing criticism from race leader Max Verstappen. In the 2023 edition of the race, the race was red-flagged again due to the servers suffering a security breach. Multiple drivers also had their game crash, including Max Verstappen, who had been leading the race before his game crashed twice. Extremely frustrated, he said he would uninstall the game and vowed to never race in the event again.

In February 2022, rFactor 2 released the IndyCar IR-18, with an official license of the car liveries of the full IndyCar lineup, and main publisher Motorsport Games had a dedicated IndyCar title in development before it was canceled in 2023. This potentially signals a move of the official IndyCar eSports series to rFactor 2, which in 2020 was held in iRacing with the INDYCAR iRacing Challenge.

== Use of rF2 engine in other games ==
rFactor 2's physics was licensed to Amazon Game Studios' The Grand Tour Game, which was released in January 2019.

Since Motorsport Games acquisition of Studio 397 in 2021, all Motorsport Games titles used the rF2 physics engine, starting with NASCAR 21: Ignition, which was released in October 2021. Motorsport Games planned to use the engine in their now-shelved British Touring Car Championship and IndyCar Series games.

== See also ==
- rFpro
