= Le Mans 24 (video game) =

1997 video game

- Developer: Sega
- Publisher: Sega
- Composer: Taihei Sato
- Platform: Arcade
- Release: August 1997
- Genre: Racing
- Arcade system: Sega Model 3 Step 1.5

Le Mans 24 is an arcade game by Sega produced in 1997 and is based on the Sega Model 3 Step 1.5 arcade system board. The game is based on the race of the same name with some of its cars from the 1996 race, including ones that appeared in Scud Race. It was licensed by its organisers, Automobile Club de l'Ouest. Only GT1 and Group C cars make appearances in the game with the JWA Gulf Porsche 917 (a Group 5 racer, under the pre-1972 rule amendment) appearing as a bonus car which is an opponent fought at the end of the race, and can be played with a cheat code. Sonic the Hedgehog makes a cameo as a secret racer, unlocked by entering a cheat code.

== Car list ==
These are the cars that appeared in the game (listed in order of year, team, car):

- 1971 JWA Gulf Porsche 917 (bonus car)
- 1989 Sauber Mercedes C9
- 1991 Mazdaspeed Mazda 787B
- 1996 McLaren F1 GTR (returning from Scud Race)
- 1996 NISMO Skyline GT-R GT1 (R33)
- 1996 Porsche 911 GT1
- 1996 Ferrari F40 GTE (returning from Scud Race)

== Reception ==
In Japan, Game Machine listed Le Mans 24 on their December 1, 1997 issue as being the third most-successful dedicated arcade game of the month.
