= WEC Le Mans =

1986 video game

- Developers: Konami; Technostar/Coreland; Alpha Denshi
- Publisher: Konami: Arcade Konami Home Computers Ocean Software
- Platforms: Arcade, Amstrad CPC, Commodore 64, MSX, ZX Spectrum
- Release: September 1986: Arcade September 1986 Home Computers; EU: 1989
- Genre: Racing simulation
- Arcade system: Konami Dual 68000

WEC Le Mans, known as WEC Le Mans 24 (Note: Japanese: WECル・マン24, Hepburn: WEC Ru Man 24) in Japan, is a racing simulation video game released in arcades by Konami in 1986. The Lap of Le Mans is split up into three sections, during which the time of day changes from day to dusk, dusk to night, and night to dawn.

== Gameplay ==
The game attempted to realistically simulate car driving, with the car jumping up and down, turning back and forth, and spinning up to 180 degrees, with an emphasis on acceleration, braking, and gear shifting, along with the need for counter-steering to avoid spin-outs. It also featured accurately simulated courses approved by the Automobile Club de l'Ouest, and used force feedback to simulate road vibration in the form of a vibrating steering wheel that reacts to the driver's acceleration and off-road bumps.

The game is known as being very difficult to complete: the track's width remains constant at three lanes of racing, and any slight contact with an opposing race car will result in either a spin, or a spectacular flip in the air. Going off the course and running wide at a corner will also end in a spin.

Play continues until the timer is depleted or four successive laps are completed, which ends the game.

== Arcade cabinet ==
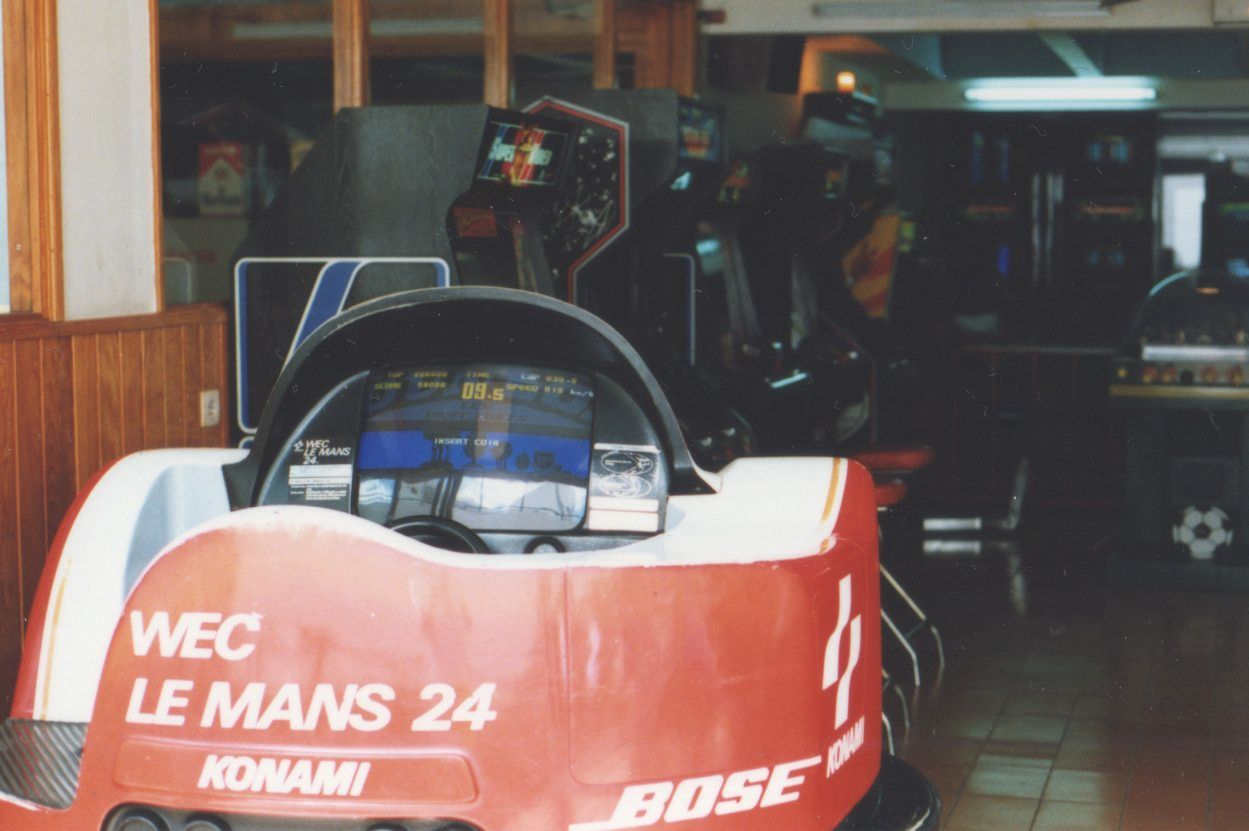
WEC Le Mans deluxe arcade unit

Konami released three different video game arcade cabinet versions of the video arcade game, an upright machine, a 'mini' spin where the driver sat in a sit-down cockpit, and the 'big' spin version, the deluxe arcade version that would actually spin the gamer around a 360° spinning base, turning left or right depending on the corner. The front of the 'big' spin arcade machine looked like a real Prototype C Race car.

The arcade cabinet was expensive for its time, with a high price of £7000 in 1986, equivalent to £21000 in 2025.

== Ports ==
The game was ported by Ocean Software, on their Imagine label, to the Amstrad CPC, Commodore 64, MSX, and ZX Spectrum. Ports to the Amiga and Atari ST were expected, but never came to fruition.

== Reception ==
Reception (ports)
Review scores
Publication	Scores		
Publication	C64	CPC	ZX
ACE		841/1000	832/1000
Computer and Video Games		82%	83%
Crash			66%
The Games; Machine	14%		61%
Sinclair User			91%
Your Sinclair			9/10
Awards
Entity		Award	
Your Sinclair		Megagame	

The game was commercially successful in arcades. In Japan, Game Machine listed WEC Le Mans on their January 15, 1987 issue as being the most-successful upright arcade unit of the month. The spin cabinet went on to be the fourth highest-grossing upright/cockpit arcade game of 1987 in Japan, below Out Run, Super Hang-On and Darius. On the Coinslot dedicated arcade game charts in the United Kingdom, WEC Le Mans was number-three in July 1988, below Street Fighter and Continental Circus.

The arcade version was critically acclaimed upon release. Following its debut at the Preview '87 show in September 1986, Computer and Video Games gave it a positive review in its January 1987 issue, with Clare Edgeley declaring it her favourite game at show, describing it as a "fast and realistic racing simulation" and praising the rotating cockpit cabinet, concluding it to be the most "exhilerating [sic] game" she played in months. She gave it "the edge" over Out Run, mainly for better "movement", but noted "many seem to prefer Out Run". At the ATEI (Amusement Trades Exhibition International) show in January 1987, both Out Run and WEC LE Mans "stole the January show" according to Computer and Video Games. Clare Edgeley reviewed it again in the February 1987 issue of Sinclair User, stating it "is far and way the most sophisticated and certainly the most thrilling game I've ever played", describing it as "like Hang-On" but "with a racing car which you actually sit inside" and a "movement system" that "is entirely different from anything experienced before" where "you really get thrown around" and "which simulates each action, even spinning" and "shakes the whole car" when going off track or skidding on the marked border lines. She stated "there are hazards to avoid, other cars bombing past you", "great graphics and high speed". Top Score newsletter called it a "superb driving simulator that was unfortunately overshadowed" by Out Run.

The Spectrum version of the game also earned critical acclaim. The Spectrum version was also commercially successful, reaching 4th place on the UK Spectrum chart in May 1989.

Konami's Tanaka Fumihaki cited WEC Le Mans as the chief inspiration for Konami's 1995 game Speed King.

== See also ==
- Hot Chase
- Out Run
