= Motorsport Games =

American video game developer and publisher

Motorsport Games Inc.
- Type: Public
- Traded as: Nasdaq: MSGM
- Industry: Video games
- Founded: 2018; 8 years ago, in Miami, Florida, U.S.
- Area served: Worldwide
- Revenue: US$11,297,898 (2025)
- Net income: US$6,844,897 (2025)
- Total assets: US$11,968,066 (2025)
- Number of employees: 44 (As of December 31, 2025)
- Website: motorsportgames.com

Motorsport Games Inc. is an American video game developer, publisher and esports event organizer based in Miramar, Florida.

== History ==
Motorsport Games was founded in 2018 and on August 14 the studio acquired 53.5% equity interest in 704Games, at the time the current rights holder to the NASCAR video game series. As a result, Motorsport Games became the official developer and publisher of the NASCAR video game racing franchise. In the same month, Motorsport Games collaborated with Automobile Club de l'Ouest (ACO) to launch the Le Mans esports series competition.

In September 2019, Motorsport Games released the NASCAR Heat 4 game. In May 2020, 704Games replaced Monster Games as developer for NASCAR Heat 5, which was released two months later on July 10.

In 2021 the company acquired Studio 397 and its rFactor 2 sim racing platform. rFactor2 was appointed as the official sim racing platform of the all-electric FIA Formula E championship in 2022.

In August 2021 former President of EA Sports and former CEO of Liverpool Football Club Peter Moore had joined the board of Motorsport Games.

=== 2020 esports events ===
In 2020, during the COVID-19 pandemic Motorsport Games produced several official esports events for NASCAR, 24 Hours of Le Mans, FIA Formula E World Championship and FIA World Rallycross Championship, eNASCAR Heat Pro League and Virtual Race of Champions.

Motorsport Games collaborated with Codemasters and Monster Energy, the sponsor of the FIA World Rallycross Championship, to create the World RX Esports Invitational which was held in April.

In the same year in June, Motorsport Games, the Automobile Club de l'Ouest and the FIA World Endurance Championship organized the 24 Hours of Le Mans Virtual race on the rFactor 2 gaming platform as a placeholder for the 2020 24 Hours of Le Mans which has been postponed from June to September as a result of the impact of the COVID-19 pandemic in France. It was watched by 14.2 million television viewers and reached 8.6 million views, and was the recipient of several awards such as Autosport Pioneering and Engineering Award at the Autosport Awards.

=== IPO and 2021 acquisitions ===
Motorsport Games completed its Initial public offering (IPO) in January 2021, ended up raising $69 million which was used for acquiring the remaining equity interest of 704Games, and for acquiring KartKraft and Studio 397. In February, Motorsport Games entered into an agreement to acquire game assets and code of PC kart racing simulator, KartKraft from Black Delta for an undisclosed amount with an aim to form a new studio called Motorsport Games Australia where the development of KartKraft will continue, and completed the deal in March. In March, Motorsport Games entered into an agreement with Luminis International to acquire Studio 397, the developer of rFactor 2 which was completed two months later.

Motorsport Games combined the Unreal graphics engine and the rFactor physics technology for NASCAR 21: Ignition, which was released on October 26 the same year. The combination of the rFactor and Unreal engines was used for all the upcoming titles produced by Motorsport Games, such as British Touring Car Championship game which was in development. In the same month, Motorsport Games entered into a license with IndyCar to develop both IndyCar video game series, with a planned launch date in 2023, and events. Also in June, Motorsport Games announced the development of a dedicated video game title for the 24 Hours of Le Mans through a licensing deal with that race's parent organizations, the Automobile Club de l'Ouest and the FIA World Endurance Championship, originally scheduled for release in 2023.

The BTCC game was originally scheduled to have been released in 2022 but was delayed for 2024.

In December 2022, Motorsport Games began an equity purchase agreement with NYC-based Alumni Capital in the amount of up to $2 million in company stock, with options up to a total of $10 million expiring December 31, 2023.

By October 2023, Motorsports Games was no longer working on a future NASCAR title, as the license to produce NASCAR video games was transferred to iRacing, who have a long-standing relationship with NASCAR, with a title planned for 2025. Motorsport laid off 40% of their workforce in the following month. The same week, TOCA, the rights holder for the BTCC, ended its partnership with the company "due to ongoing fundamental breaches of the agreement by Motorsport Games". Over a week later, IndyCar terminated its agreement with the company, citing Motorsport Games' failure to deliver a game within the 2023 season.

On April 15, 2025, Motorsport Games secured a $2.5 million investment from virtual reality technology company Pimax.

On April 27, 2026, Motorsport Games entered a share repurchase agreement with their parent company Driven Lifestyle Group LLC, reacquiring a total of 904,395 shares for $4.11 each, equating to $3,717,063.45.

== Controversies ==
On March 28, 2022, U.S. federal judge Stephanos Bibas accepted a motion by investors Innovate 2 Corp., Continental General Insurance Company, and Leo Capital Holdings LLC to sue Motorsport Games in the United States District Court for the District of Delaware. In the filing, the investors accuse four Motorsport Games executives of securities fraud, claiming that the executives provided misleading statistics to the remaining investors of 704Games about the company's financial situation and the sales performance of its main product, the NASCAR Heat franchise. The investors allege that the information they received allowed Motorsport Games to buy out the remaining shares of 704Games at a significant discount to what Motorsport Games offered at their IPO, at which point the NASCAR Heat series accounted for a majority of Motorsport Games' total net revenue, estimated at 99%. However on February 26, 2025, Motorsport Games won the legal argument against Innovate 2 on all counts, dismissed by Judge Bibas stating that "Innovate has no evidence that any representations at that meeting were false when made.”

The same year in November, Motorsport Games received a notice of non-compliance with Nasdaq listing rules after its board of directors resigned over funding disputes. The company reported losses of $7.5 million against revenue of $1.2 million in the third quarter of 2022.

In January 2023, Motorsport Games organised the fourth annual Le Mans virtual 24-hour endurance race, a parallel to the real-life 24 Hours of Le Mans event. The race took place in Motorsport Games' sim racing video game rFactor 2 and featured notable motorsport drivers, such as Formula One World Champion Max Verstappen and former Formula One driver Romain Grosjean. The event was plagued with server issues and disconnections, which lead a lot of backlash from participants. Verstappen described the event as a "clown show", and online content creator and participant Jimmy Broadbent stated that this would ultimately "damage sim racing" as a medium. Several days after the event, an anonymous employee threatened to publicly leak the source code for NASCAR Heat 5, NASCAR 21: Ignition, KartKraft and the unreleased IndyCar game unless unpaid wage payments were made.

== Games ==
- NASCAR Heat 4 (2019, published)
- NASCAR Heat 5 and Next-Gen DLC (2020, 2023)
- NASCAR 21: Ignition (2021)
- rFactor 2 (2021)
- KartKraft (2022)
- NASCAR Rivals (2022)
- Le Mans Ultimate (2024)

== Cancelled games ==
- IndyCar (2023)
- British Touring Car Championship (2023)
