= List of racing video games =

The following is a list of notable vehicle racing video games. The genre first emerged in the mid-1970s.

== Legend ==
Video game platforms
3DO	3DO	3DS	Nintendo 3DS, 3DS Virtual Console, iQue 3DS	64DD	64DD
A2001	Arcadia 2001	AMI	Amiga	AMI32	Amiga CD32
AmiOS	AmigaOS family, including AmigaOS 4, AROS, and MorphOS	APPII	Apple II	ARC	Acorn Archimedes
Arcade	Arcade video game	ATR	Atari 8-bit computers	ATR26	Atari 2600, Atari 2800
ATR78	Atari 7800	ATRST	Atari ST, Atari Falcon	Bada	Bada
BB10	replace with BBOS	BBC	BBC Micro, Acorn Electron, BBC Master	BEOS	BeOS, including Haiku
BSD	Berkeley Software Distribution, OpenBSD or FreeBSD	C128	Commodore 128	C64	Commodore 64
CDI	CD-i	CLV	ColecoVision, Coleco Adam	CPC	Amstrad CPC
DC	Dreamcast	DOS	PC DOS / MS-DOS, Windows 3.X	DROID	Android
DS	Nintendo DS, DSiWare, iQue DS	FDS	Famicom Disk System	FM7	FM-7
FMT	FM Towns	FOS	Fire OS	GB	Game Boy
GBA	Game Boy Advance, iQue GBA	GBC	Game Boy Color	GCN	GameCube
GCOM	Game.com	GD	Google Daydream	GEN	Genesis / Mega Drive
GG	Game Gear	GX4000	GX4000	GZM	Gizmondo
IBM	IBM PC, IBM PC compatible	INT	Intellivision	iOS	iOS, iPhone, iPod, iPadOS, iPad, visionOS, Apple Vision Pro
JAG	Atari Jaguar	JAGCD	Atari Jaguar CD	LIN	Linux, SteamOS
LYNX	Atari Lynx	MAC	Classic Mac OS, 2001 and before	MEEGO	MeeGo
MOBI	Mobile phone	MSX	MSX	N64	Nintendo 64, iQue Player
NEO	Neo Geo AES	NEOCD	Neo Geo CD	NES	Nintendo Entertainment System / Famicom
NGE	N-Gage	NX	(replace with NS)	NX2	(replace with NS2)
ODY2	Magnavox Odyssey 2	OSX	macOS	PC60	PC-6000 series
PC88	PC-8800 series	PC98	PC-9800 series	PCE	TurboGrafx-16 / PC Engine
PS1	PlayStation 1	PS2	PlayStation 2	PS3	PlayStation 3
PS4	PlayStation 4	PS5	PlayStation 5	PSN	PlayStation Network
PSP	PlayStation Portable	PSV	PlayStation Vita	PSVR	Playstation VR, PlayStation VR2
Quest	Meta Quest / Oculus Quest family, including Oculus Rift	RZ	R-Zone	S32X	32X
SAT	Sega Saturn	SCD	Sega CD / Mega-CD	SCV	Super Cassette Vision
SG1K	SG-1000	SMS	Master System	SNES	Super NES / Super Famicom / Super Comboy
SNG	social network game	Steam	Steam	SYM	Symbian OS, including EPOC32
TH1	First generation Thomson computers	TI99	TI-99/4A	TIZ	Tizen
TRSCC	TRS-80 Color Computer	tvOS	tvOS	VIC20	VIC-20
WEB	Browser game	webOS	webOS	Wii	Wii, WiiWare, Wii Virtual Console
WiiU	Wii U, WiiU Virtual Console	WIN	Windows, all versions Windows 95 and up	WMO	Windows Mobile
WP	Windows Phone	X1	Sharp X1	X360	(replace with XB360)
X68K	X68000	XBOX	(replace with XB)	XOne	(replace with XBO)
XSX/S	(replace with XBX/S)	ZB	Zeebo	Zune	Zune HD
ZX	ZX Spectrum				

== List ==
=== 1970s and 1980s ===
Title	Developer	Publisher	Platforms	Release date	Ref.
3D Deathchase	Micromega	Timex	ZX	1983	
4x4 Off-Road Racing	Odan MicroDesign	Epyx	CPC, ATRST, AMI, DOS, C64, MSX, ZX	1988	
500cc Grand Prix	Microïds		CPC, ATRST, C64, DOS, TH1	1987	
5th Gear	Fantastic Four	Hewson Consultants	AMI, ATRST, C64	1988	
750cc Grand Prix	WASP	Codemasters	ZX, CPC	1989	
A.P.B.	Atari Games		Arcade, AMI, ATRST, C64, LYNX, ZX	1987	
Action Fighter	Sega		Arcade, AMI, C64, CPC, ZX, SMS, ATRST	1986	
Alex Kidd BMX Trial	Sega		SMS	1987-11-15	
Astro Race	Taito		Arcade	1973	
Auto Racing	APh Technological Consulting	Mattel Electronics	INT	1980	
Autoduel	Origin Systems		ATR, ATRST, C64, APPII, DOS, MAC, AMI	1985	
Badlands	Atari Games		Arcade	1989	
Baja Buggies	Arcade Plus, Gamestar	Gamestar	ATR	1982	
Battle Out Run	Sega, Arc System Works	Sega	SMS	1989-09-04	
Battle-Road, The	Irem		Arcade	1984	
Beach Buggy Simulator	Sysoft	Silverbird	ZX, C64, CPC	1988	
Big Run	Jaleco		Arcade, AMI, ATRST, SNES	1989	
BMX Simulator	Codemasters		AMI, ATR, ATRST, CPC, C64, MSX, ZX	1986	
Buggy Boy	Tatsumi	JP: Tatsumi; NA: Data East; WW: Taito	Arcade, C64, ZX, CPC, AMI, ATRST	1985	
Buggy Challenge	Taito	NA: Midway Games; WW: Taito	Arcade	1984	
Bump 'n' Jump	Data East	Data East, Bally Midway, Vic Tokai	Arcade, ATR26, C64, CLV, INT, NES	1982	
Burnin' Rubber	Colo de Wergifosse	Colosoftware	C64	1983	
Car Wars	Texas Instruments		TI99	1981	
Championship Sprint	Atari Games		Arcade	1986	
Change Lanes	Taito		Arcade, ATR26, VIC20, MSX	1983	
Chariot Race	Micro-Antics		VIC20	1983	
Chase H.Q.	Taito		Arcade, AMI, CPC, ATRST, C64, FMT, GB, GBC, GG, MSX, SMS, GEN, SNES, NES, PCE, ZX	1988-10	
Chequered Flag	Psion	Sinclair Research	ZX	1983-11	
Chicago 90	Microïds		CPC, ATRST, AMI, DOS	1989	
City Bomber	Konami		Arcade	1987	
City Connection	Jaleco		Arcade, NES, MSX, ZX	1985	
Cobra Triangle	Rare	Nintendo	NES	1989-07	
Continental Circus	Taito		Arcade, AMI, CPC, ATRST, C64, MSX, ZX	1987	
Crash 'N Score	Atari, Inc.		Arcade	1975	
Crashing Race	Taito		Arcade	1976	
Crazee Rider	Kevin Edwards	Superior Software, Acornsoft	BBC	1987	
Crosscountry	Ingenuity Works		APPII, DOS, MAC, WIN, LIN	1985	
Cycle Race: Road Man	Advance Communication Company	Tokyo Shoseki	NES	1988-12-17	
Cycles: International Grand Prix Racing, The	Distinctive Software	Accolade	AMI, C64, DOS, CPC, ZX	1989	
Datsun 280 ZZZAP	Dave Nutting Associates	Midway Manufacturing	Arcade	1976-11	
Death Race	Howell Ivy	Exidy	Arcade	1976-04-01	
Deathtrack	Dynamix	Activision	DOS	1989	
Destruction Derby (1975 video game)	Howell Ivy	Exidy	Arcade	1975	
Dirt Fox	Namco		Arcade	1989-06	
Dodge 'Em	Atari, Inc.		ATR26	1980	
DONKEY.BAS	Bill Gates, Neil Konzen	Microsoft	DOS	1981	
Drag Race Eliminator	Family Software	Hisense	C64, IBM	1986	
Dragster	Activision		ATR26	1980	
Duel: Test Drive II, The	Distinctive Software	Accolade	APPII, C64, AMI, ATRST, DOS	1989	
The Dukes of Hazzard	Coleco	Elite Systems	CLV, ZX	1984	
E-Type	Gordon J. Key	The Fourth Dimension	BBC, ARC	1989	
Enduro	Activision		ATR26	1983	
Enduro Racer	Sega AM2	Sega	Arcade, SMS, C64, CPC, ZX, ATRST, TH1	1986-09-20	
Excitebike	Nintendo R&D1, Hudson Soft, Arika	Nintendo, Hudson Soft	NES, PC88, X1, Arcade, GBA, GCN, Wii, WiiU, 3DS	1984-11-30	
F-1	Namco	Atari, Inc.	Arcade	1976	
F-1 Dream	Capcom	Romstar	Arcade, PCE	1988	
F-1 Race	HAL Laboratory	Nintendo	NES, GB	1984-11-02	
F1 Spirit	Konami		MSX, GB	1987	
Family Circuit	Namco		NES	1988-01-06	
Fast Lane	Konami		Arcade	1987	
Fast Tracks: The Computer Slot Car Construction Kit	Activision		C64	1986	
Final Lap	Namco	Atari Games	Arcade, NES	1987-12-05	
Final Lap Twin	Namco	Namco, NEC	PCE	1989-07-07	
Fire Truck	Atari, Inc.		Arcade	1978	
Fonz / Moto-Cross	Sega	Gremlin	Arcade	1976	
Formula One	G.B. Munday	CRL Group	ZX, CPC	1985	
Four Trax	Namco		Arcade	1989-11	
Full Throttle	Mervyn J. Estcourt	Micromega	ZX, MSX	1984	
Fury, The	Creative Reality	Martech Games	CPC, ZX	1988	
Gee Bee Air Rally	Activision		C64, AMI, CPC, ZX	1987	
Gran Trak 10	Atari, Inc.		Arcade	1974	
Grand Prix	Activision, Taito	Activision	ATR26, Arcade	1982-03	
Grand Prix Circuit	Distinctive Software	Accolade	APPII, CPC, C64, AMI, ATRST, DOS, ZX, MAC	1988	
Grand Prix Construction Set	Superior Software	Acornsoft	BBC	1987	
Grand Prix Manager	Silicon Joy		ZX	1984	
Grand Prix Simulator	Codemasters		CPC, ATR, C64, ZX	1987	
Great American Cross-Country Road Race, The	Activision		ATR, APPII, C64	1985	
Hang-On	Sega		Arcade	1985-07	
Hard Drivin'	Atari Games		Arcade	1989	
Harley Davidson: The Road to Sturgis	Incredible Technologies, Inc.	Mindscape	AMI, ATRST, DOS	1989	
Hazard Run	Artworx	Dennis R. Zander	ATR	1982	
Head On	Sega	Gremlin	Arcade, C64, MSX, AMI, GB	1979-04	
Hi-way	Atari, Inc.		Arcade	1975	
Highway Race	Taito		Arcade	1983	
Hot Chase	Konami		Arcade	1988-06	
Hot Rod	Sega		Arcade, ATRST, C64, AMI, ZX, CPC	1988	
Hot Wheels	A. Eddy Goldfarb & Associates	Epyx	C64	1984-09-10	
Indianapolis 500: The Simulation	Papyrus Design Group	Electronic Arts	DOS, AMI	1989	
Indy 4	Atari, Inc.		Arcade	1976	
Indy 500	Atari, Inc.		ATR26	1977	
Indy 800	Atari, Inc.		Arcade	1975	
Kikstart 2	Magnetic Fields	Mastertronic	AMI, CPC, C64, C128, ZX	1987	
Knight Rider	Pack-In-Video	Acclaim Entertainment	NES	1988-09-30	
Konami GT	Konami		Arcade	1985	
Laser Grand Prix	Taito		Arcade	1983	
Last V8, The	David Darling	Mastertronic	C64, C128, ATR, CPC	1985	
LeMans	Atari, Inc.		Arcade	1976	
Live and Let Die	Elite Systems International	Domark	AMI, ATRST, CPC, C64, ZX	1988	
Lombard RAC Rally	Red Rat Software	Mandarin Software	ATRST, AMI, DOS	1988	
Mach Rider	Nintendo R&D2	Nintendo	Arcade, NES, 3DS, Wii, WiiU	1985-11-21	
Mancopter	Datasoft		C64	1984	
Mattel Auto Race	Mattel		—N/a	1976	
Milk Race	Icon Design	Mastertronic	ZX, C64, ATR, MSX, CPC	1987	
Monaco GP	Sega	Gremlin	Arcade, SG1K	1979	
Moto Roader	NCS	Konami	PCE, Wii, WiiU	1989-02-23	
Motocross	Mattel Electronics		INT	1983	
Motocross Maniacs	Konami	Ultra Games	GB	1989-09-20	
Motor Mania	UMI		C64	1982	
MotoRace USA	Irem	Williams Interactive	Arcade, SAT, SG1K, NES	1983	
MunchMobile	SNK Corporation	Centuri	Arcade, TI99	1983	
New Rally-X	Namco	Midway Games	Arcade, MOBI, X360	1981-02	
Night Driver	Atari, Inc.		Arcade, ATR26, C64, MSX	1976-10	
Nürburgring 1	Rainer Foerst GmbH		Arcade	1975	
Out Run	Sega AM2	Sega	Arcade, SMS, C64, AMI, ATRST, CPC, MSX, ZX, DOS, PCE	1986-09-20	
Out-Run 3-D	Sega		SMS	1988	
Overdrive	Superior Software		BBC	1984	
Paperboy	Atari Games		Arcade	1985-02	
Pitstop	Epyx		C64, ATR, CLV	1983	
Pitstop II	Epyx		C64, IBM, TRSCC, ATR, APPII, Wii	1984	
Plazma Line	Technosoft		PC88, PC60, FM7, X1	1984-12	
Pole Position	Namco	Namco, Atari	Arcade, BBC, C64, VIC20, DOS, ZX	1982-09-01	
Pole Position II	Namco	Namco, Atari, Inc.	Arcade, BBC, C64, VIC20, ZX, ATR78, SCV, DOS	1983-12	
Power Drift	Sega AM2	Sega, Asmik, Activision	Arcade, AMI, CPC, ATRST, C64, DC, DOS, MSX, PCE, SAT, ZX, 3DS	1988	
Power Drive	Bally Midway		Arcade	1987	
Powerdrome	Michael Powell	Electronic Arts	ATRST, AMI, DOS, WIN, PS2, XBOX	1988	
R.C. Pro-Am	Rare	Nintendo, Rare, Tradewest	NES, Arcade, GEN	1987	
Race - Spin-out - Cryptogram	Philips	Magnavox	ODY2	1978	
Racer Mini Yonku: Japan Cup	Konami		NES	1989-08-25	
Racing Destruction Set	Electronic Arts		C64, ATR	1985	
Racing Hero	Sega		Arcade	1989	
Rad Racer	Square	Nintendo, Mattel, Square	NES, Arcade	1987-08-07	
Rally Bike	Toaplan	Taito	Arcade, NES, X68K	1988	
Rally Speedway	Adventure International		ATR, C64	1983	
Rally-X	Namco	Namco, Midway Games	Arcade, MSX	1980-10-03	
Revs	Geoff Crammond	Acornsoft, Telecomsoft, Superior Software	BBC, C64	1984	
Richard Petty's Talladega	Cosmi	Electronic Arts, Ariolasoft	Arcade, C64, ATR26, AMI, NES	1985	
Road Avenger	Data East	Sega	3DO, Arcade, iOS, DOS, MSX, PS1, SCD, SAT	1985-08	
Road Champion	Taito, Williams Electronics, Inc.	Taito	Arcade, MSX	1978	
Road Fighter	Konami		Arcade, MSX, NES	1984-12	
Road Race	Sega		Arcade	1976	
Road Runner	Atari Games		Arcade, CPC, ATR26, ATRST, C64, DOS, ZX, NES	1985	
RoadBlasters	Atari Games	Atari Games, U.S. Gold	Arcade, GEN, LYNX, CPC, C64, AMI, ZX, ATRST, NES	1987	
Rolling Crash	Nichibutsu	Nichibutsu	Arcade	1979	
Route-16	Sun Electronics	Centuri	Arcade, NES, A2001	1981	
Route-16 Turbo	Sunsoft		NES	1985-10-04	
S.T.U.N. Runner	Atari Games		Arcade	1989	
Seicross	Nichibutsu	Nichibutsu	Arcade, NES	1984	
Slalom	Rare	Nintendo	Arcade, NES	1986	
Space Race	Atari, Inc.		Arcade	1973-07-16	
Special Criminal Investigation	Taito		Arcade, AMI, CPC, ATRST, C64, DOS, SMS, PCE, ZX	1989	
Speed Freak	Vectorbeam		Arcade	1979-03	
Speed Race / Wheels	Taito	NA: Midway Games; WW: Taito	Arcade, N64	1974	
Speed Race DX / Wheels DX	Taito	NA: Midway Games; WW: Taito	Arcade, AMI	1975	
Speed Race Twin / Wheels Twin	Taito	NA: Midway Games; WW: Taito	Arcade	1976	
Sprint 1	Atari, Inc.		Arcade	1978	
Sprint 2	Atari, Inc.		Arcade	1976	
Spy Hunter	Midway Games		Arcade	1983	
Spy Hunter II	Bally Midway		Arcade	1987	
Star Rider	Computer Creations	Williams Electronics	Arcade	1983	
Stock Car	A. W. Halse	Micro Power	BBC, C64	1984	
Street Racer	Atari, Inc.		ATR26	1977	
Street Rod	P.Z.Karen Co. Development Group, Logical Design Works	California Dreams	AMI, C64, DOS	1989	
Stunt Car Racer	MicroStyle, The Creative Assembly	MicroProse, MicroPlay	AMI, CPC, ATRST, C64, DOS, ZX	1989	
Super Bug	Atari, Inc.		Arcade	1977-09	
Super Hang-On	Sega AM2	Sega	Arcade, GEN, GBA, AMI, ATRST, MAC, ZX, CPC, C64, 3DS, PS4	1987	
Super Monaco GP	Sega	U.S. Gold, Sega	Arcade, GEN, AMI, CPC, ATRST, C64, GG, SMS, ZX	1989-05-19	
Super Off Road	Leland Corporation		Arcade	1989	
Super Rider	Venture Line	Taito	Arcade	1983	
Super Speed Race	Taito		Arcade, AMI	1977	
Super Speed Race CL5	Taito		Arcade	1978	
Super Speed Race GP-V	Taito		Arcade, C64	1980	
Super Speed Race Jr.	Taito		Arcade	1985	
Super Speed Race V	Taito		Arcade, AMI	1978	
Super Sprint	Atari Games		Arcade	1986	
Suzuki's RM 250 Motocross	Dynamix	Gamestar	DOS	1989	
Tail to Nose	Video System		Arcade	1989	
Taito Grand Prix: Eikou heno License	Now Production	Taito	FDS	1987-12-18	
Techno Cop	Gray Matter, Imagexcel	U.S. Gold	AMI, CPC, APPII, ATRST, C64, DOS, GEN, ZX	1988	
Test Drive	Distinctive Software	Accolade	APPII, C64, AMI, ATRST, DOS	1987-06-06	
Top Speed	Taito	Romstar	Arcade, X68K	1987-10	
Tranz Am	Tim and Chris Stamper	Ultimate Play the Game	ZX	1983-07	
Turbo	Sega		Arcade, CLV, INT	1981	
Turbo Esprit	Mike Richardson	Durell Software	ZX, CPC, C64	1986-05	
Turbo Outrun	Sega AM2	Sega	Arcade, ATRST, C64, AMI, ZX, CPC, DOS, FMT, GEN	1989-02-11	
Twin Course T.T.	Sega		Arcade	1977	
TX-1	Tatsumi	Namco, Atari, Inc.	Arcade, C64, ATR78, ZX	1983-12	
TX-1 V8	Tatsumi	Namco	Arcade	1984-03	
Up'n Down	Sega		Arcade, ATR26, ATR, CLV, C64	1983	
Vette!	Sphere	Spectrum HoloByte	DOS, MAC, PC98	1989	
Victory Run	Hudson Soft		PCE, PSN	1987-12-28	
WEC Le Mans	Konami, Banpresto	ADK, Imagine Software	Arcade, CPC, C64, MSX, ZX	1986-09	
Winning Run	Namco		Arcade	1988-12	
World Grand Prix	Sega		SMS	1986-09-21	

=== 1990s ===
Title	Developer	Publisher	Platforms	Release date	Ref.
2Xtreme	989 Studios	Sony Computer Entertainment	PS1	1996-11-06	
360: Three Sixty	Smart Dog	Cryo Interactive	PS1	1999-07	
3Xtreme	989 Sports	Sony Computer Entertainment	PS1	1999-04-21	
A.B. Cop	Aicom	Sega	Arcade	1990-12-11	
ABC Sports Indy Racing	Shot Sports Software	ABC Interactive	WIN	1997	
Ace Driver	Namco		Arcade	1994-11	
Ace Driver: Victory Lap	Namco		Arcade	1996-11	
AeroGauge	Locomotive Games	ASCII Entertainment	N64	1998-04-30	
Aguri Suzuki F-1 Super Driving	Genki	Absolute Entertainment	SNES, GB	1992-07-14	
Air Boarder 64	Human Entertainment	ASCII Corporation	N64	1998-03-27	
Al Unser Jr. Arcade Racing	Mindscape Bordeaux	Mindscape	WIN, MAC	1995	
Al Unser Jr.'s Road to the Top	Radical Entertainment	Mindscape	SNES	1994-11	
Al Unser Jr.'s Turbo Racing	Data East		NES	1990-03	
Alpine Surfer	Namco		Arcade	1996-07-22	
AMA Superbike	Motorsims		WIN	1999-10	
Andretti Racing	Stormfront Studios	EA Sports	SAT, WIN, PS1	1994	
Atari Karts	Miracle Designs	Atari Corporation	JAG	1995-12-15	
ATR: All Terrain Racing	Team17		AMI, AMI32	1995	
Automobili Lamborghini	Titus France		N64	1997-11-30	
Ayrton Senna's Super Monaco GP II	Sega		SMS, GEN, GG	1992-07-17	
Battle Cars	Malibu Interactive	Namco	SNES	1993-10	
Battle Cross	A-Max	Imagineer	SNES	1994-12-09	
Battle Gear	Taito		Arcade, PS1, PS2	1996	
Battle Grand Prix	KID	Hudson Soft, Konami	SNES	1992-03-27	
Battle Racers	Banpresto	Genki, Bandai Namco Holdings	SNES	1995-03-17	
BC Racers	Core Design		SCD, S32X, WIN, 3DO	1995	
Beetle Adventure Racing	Paradigm Entertainment	Electronic Arts	N64	1999-02-28	
Beverly Hills Cop	Tynesoft		AMI, CPC, ATRST, BBC, C64, DOS, ZX	1990	
Big Red Racing	Big Red Software	Eidos Interactive	DOS	1996-02-29	
Bigfoot	Beam Software Company	Acclaim Entertainment	NES	1990-07	
Bike Daisuki! Hashiriya Kon - Rider's Spirits	Genki	Masaya	SNES	1994-09-30	
Biker Mice from Mars	Konami		SNES	1994-12	
Bill Elliott's NASCAR Challenge	Distinctive Software	Konami	DOS, AMI, MAC, NES, GB	1990	
Bomberman Fantasy Race	Graphic Research Inc.	Atlus, Hudson Soft	PS1	1998-08-06	
Boss Rally	Boss Game Studios	SouthPeak Interactive	WIN	1999	
Bravo Air Race	Xing Entertainment	THQ	PS1	1997-07-31	
Bug Riders	n-Space	GT Interactive	WIN, PS1, PSN	1997	
Buggy Run	SIMS	Sega	SMS	1993-12	
Burning Road	Toka	Playmates Interactive	PS1	1996-09-30	
Burnout Championship Drag Racing	Bethesda Softworks		DOS	1998	
C3 Racing	Eutechnyx	Infogrames	PS1	1998	
California Speed	Atari Games		Arcade	1998	
Car & Driver Presents: Grand Tour Racing '98	Eutechnyx	Activision	PS1	1997-09-30	
Car and Driver (video game)	Lerner Research	Electronic Arts	DOS	1992	
Carmageddon	Stainless Games	Sales Curve Interactive, Interplay Productions	DOS, WIN, MAC, PS1, N64, GBC, iOS, DROID	1997-06-30	
Carmageddon II: Carpocalypse Now	Stainless Games	Sales Curve Interactive, Interplay Entertainment	WIN, MAC	1998-11-30	
CART Precision Racing	Terminal Reality	Microsoft Studios	WIN	1997-11-20	
CART World Series	Sony Computer Entertainment	SCEA	PS1	1997-09-16	
Castrol Honda Superbike 2000	Interactive Entertainment	Midas Interactive	WIN	1999-07	
Castrol Honda Superbike Racing	Interactive Entertainment	USA: Electronic Arts; EU: THQ; JP: Success	PS1	1999-04-30	
Castrol Honda SuperBike World Champions	Interactive Entertainment	Midas Interactive	WIN	1998-03-24	
Championship Motocross featuring Ricky Carmichael	Funcom Dublin	THQ	PS1	1999	
Championship Rally	Human Entertainment	HAL Laboratory	NES	1992	
Checkered Flag	Atari Corporation		LYNX	1991	
Checkered Flag (1994)	Rebellion Developments	Atari Corporation	JAG	1994-11-28	
Chocobo Racing	Square	Square Electronic Arts	PS1	1999-03-18	
Choro Q 64 2: Hachamecha Grand Prix Race	Locomotive Staff	Takara	N64	1999-12-24	
Circuit Breakers	Supersonic Software	Mindscape	PS1	1998-07	
Cisco Heat	Jaleco		AMI, CPC, Arcade, ATRST, C64, DOS, ZX	1990-10	
Club Drive	Atari Corporation		JAG	1994-11-28	
Colin McRae Rally	Codemasters	Codemasters, SCEA, Spike, THQ	WIN, PS1, GBC	1998-01-01	
Combat Cars	Accolade		GEN	1994	
Combo Racer	Imagetic Design	Gremlin Graphics	ATRST, AMI	1990	
Cool Riders	Sega AM1	Sega	Arcade	1995-04	
Cosmic Race	Neorex		PS1	1995-01-20	
Crash N Burn	Crystal Dynamics		3DO	1993-10	
Crash Team Racing	Naughty Dog	Sony Computer Entertainment	PS1	1999-09-30	
Crazy Taxi	Hitmaker, Acclaim Studios Cheltenham, Strangelite	Sega, Acclaim Entertainment, Activision Value	WIN, Arcade, DC, PS2, GCN, PSN, X360, iOS, DROID	1999	
Cruis'n Exotica	Midway Games		Arcade, N64, GBC	1999	
Cruis'n USA	Midway Games, Williams Interactive	Nintendo	Arcade, N64	1994-11	
Cruis'n World	Midway Games, Eurocom	Midway Games	Arcade, N64	1996-11	
Cyber Cycles	Namco		Arcade	1995	
Cyber Speedway	Nex Entertainment	Sega	SAT	1995	
Cyber Spin	Arc System Works	Takara	SNES	1992-03-19	
CyberRace	Cyberdreams		DOS	1993	
CyberSpeed	Mindscape		WIN, PS1	1995-09-15	
Cyclemania	Compro Games	Accolade	DOS	1994	
Dangerous Curves	Taito		Arcade	1995-07	
Danny Sullivan's Indy Heat	Rare	Leland Corporation	Arcade, NES, AMI, ATRST, C64	1991	
Days of Thunder	Argonaut Software	Mindscape	AMI, ATRST, C64, DOS, GB, NES, iOS, X360, PSN, ZX	1990	
Daytona USA	Sega AM2	Sega	Arcade, SAT, WIN, X360, PSN	1993	
Daytona USA 2	Sega AM2	Sega	Arcade	1998-06	
Daytona USA: Championship Circuit Edition	Sega AM3	Sega	SAT, WIN	1996-11	
Dead Heat Scramble	Copya System	Electro Brain	GB	1990-04-20	
Dead in the Water	Player 1	ASC Games	PS1	1999-03-19	
Death Race 98	Exidy		Arcade	1998	
Death Rally	Remedy Entertainment	Apogee Software	DOS, WIN, iOS, FOS	1996-09-07	
Delta V	Bethesda Softworks		DOS	1994	
Demolition Racer	Pitbull Syndicate	Infogrames, Atari SA	WIN, PS1, DC	1999-08-31	
Destruction Derby	Reflections Interactive	Psygnosis	DOS, PS1, SAT, DOS, N64	1995-10-20	
Destruction Derby 2	Reflections Interactive	Psygnosis	WIN, PS1	1996	
DethKarz	Melbourne House		WIN	1998	
Diddy Kong Racing	Rare	Nintendo	N64	1997-11-07	
Die Hard Trilogy	Probe Entertainment	Fox Interactive	WIN, PS1, SAT	1996-08-31	
Dirt Dash	Namco		Arcade	1995-12	
Dirt Racer	MotiveTime	Elite Systems	SNES	1995-05	
Dirt Trax FX	Sculptured Software	Acclaim Entertainment	SNES	1995-06	
Double Axle	Taito		Arcade	1991	
Double Clutch	BGS Development	Sega	GEN	1992	
Shutokō Battle '94 Keiichi Tsuchiya Drift King	Genki	Bullet Proof Software	SNES	1994-05-27	
Shutokō Battle 2: Drift King Keiichi Tsuchiya & Masaaki Bandoh	Genki	Bullet Proof Software	SNES	1995-02-24	
Driver	Reflections Interactive, Crawfish Interactive, Gameloft	GT Interactive, Infogrames, Gameloft	WIN, PS1, GBC, iOS, MAC, PSN	1999-06-30	
Driver's Eyes	Namco		Arcade	1990	
The Dukes of Hazzard: Racing for Home	Sinister Games	SouthPeak Interactive	WIN, GBC, PS1	1999-11-30	
E-Type 2	Gordon J. Key	The Fourth Dimension	ARC, BBC	1994	
Eat My Dust	Davidson & Associates, Inc.	Sierra On-Line	WIN	1996	
Eliminator Boat Duel	Sculptured Software	Electro Brain	NES	1991-11	
Emergency Call Ambulance	Sega		Arcade	1999	
ESPN Extreme Games	989 Studios	Sony Computer Entertainment	PS1, DOS	1995-09-09	
ESPN SpeedWorld	Park Place Productions	Sony Imagesoft	SNES, GEN	1994	
Explosive Racing	Funsoft	Toka	PS1	1997	
Extreme-G	Probe Entertainment	Acclaim Entertainment	N64	1997-09-30	
Extreme-G 2	Probe Entertainment	Acclaim Entertainment	N64, WIN	1998-11-18	
F-1 Grand Prix	Video System	Paradigm Entertainment	Arcade, WIN, SNES, N64, DC, GBC, PS1	1991	
F-1 Hero MD	System 3	Acclaim Entertainment	GEN, GB, NES	1992-05-12	
F-1 Sensation	Konami		NES	1993-01-29	
F-1 World Grand Prix	Paradigm Entertainment, Lankhor	Eidos Interactive, Sega	N64, DC, PS1, GBC, WIN	1998-07-31	
F-1 World Grand Prix II	Paradigm Entertainment	Video System	N64, GBC, DC	1999-09-30	
F-Zero	Nintendo EAD	Nintendo	SNES	1991-08-23	
F-Zero X	Nintendo EAD	Nintendo	N64	1998-07-14	
F1	Lankhor	Domark, Tengen	ATRST, GEN, SMS, GG, AMI	1993-01-01	
F1 Challenge	Bell Corporation	Sega, Virgin Interactive Entertainment	SAT	1995-11-02	
F1 Circus	Nichibutsu	Nichibutsu	NES, PCE	1990-09-14	
F1 Exhaust Note	Sega		Arcade	1991-11-23	
F1 Grand Prix: Nakajima Satoru	Varie		GEN	1991-12-20	
F1 Pole Position	Human Entertainment	Ubisoft	SNES	1992-10-20	
F1 Pole Position 2	Human Entertainment	Ubi Soft	SNES	1993-12-24	
F1 Pole Position 64	Human Entertainment	Ubi Soft	N64	1997-03-28	
F1 Racing Simulation	Ubisoft		WIN	1997	
F1 ROC II: Race of Champions	SETA Corporation		SNES	1993-03-05	
F1 ROC: Race of Champions	SETA Corporation		SNES	1992-02-21	
F355 Challenge	Sega AM2, CRI, Tose	Sega, Acclaim Entertainment, Sony Computer Entertainment Europe	Arcade, DC, PS2	1999-10-11	
Fastest 1	Human Entertainment		GEN	1991-06-28	
Fatal Racing / Whiplash	Gremlin		DOS	1996-01-31	
Felony 11-79	Climax Entertainment	ASCII Entertainment	PS1	1997-05-23	
Final Lap 2	Namco		Arcade	1990-08	
Final Lap 3	Namco		Arcade	1992-09	
Final Lap R	Namco		Arcade	1993-12	
Final Stretch	Genki	LOZC G. Amusements	SNES	1993-11-12	
Fire & Forget II	Titus France	Sega, Amstrad	SMS, GX4000	1990	
Flag to Flag	Zoom	Sega	DC	1999-03-25	
Formula 1	Bizarre Creations	Psygnosis	WIN, PS1	1996-08-30	
Formula 1 97	Bizarre Creations	Psygnosis	WIN, PS1	1997-09-26	
Formula 1 98	Visual Science	Psygnosis	PS1	1998-10-30	
Formula One 99	Studio 33	Psygnosis, Take-Two Interactive	WIN, PS1	1999-10-20	
Formula One Grand Prix	MicroProse		WIN, DOS, AMI, ATRST	1992-01-09	
Formula One World Championship: Beyond the Limit	Sega		SCD	1994-04-23	
Formula One: Built to Win	Winky Soft	SETA Corporation	NES	1990-11	
Full Throttle: All-American Racing	Gremlin Interactive	Cybersoft	SNES	1994-12-16	
Future Racer	D Cruise	Midas Interactive Entertainment	PS1	1997-05-23	
Galaxy 5000	Activision		NES	1991-02	
GLtron	GLtron.org	Codemasters	LIN, WIN, MAC, OSX, AmiOS, SYM, DROID	1999	
GP 500	Melbourne House	Hasbro Interactive	WIN	1999	
GP Rider	Sega AM2	Sega	Arcade, SMS, GG	1990	
GP-1	Genki	Atlus, Sega	SNES	1993-06-25	
GP-1: Part II	Genki	Atlus, Sega	SNES	1994-11-18	
Gran Turismo	Polyphony Digital	Sony Computer Entertainment	PS1	1997-12-23	
Gran Turismo 2	Polyphony Digital	Sony Computer Entertainment	PS1	1999-12-11	
Grand Prix 2	MicroProse		DOS	1996-08-30	
Grand Prix Legends	Papyrus Design Group	Sierra On-Line	WIN	1998-10-31	
Grand Prix Manager	MicroProse		WIN	1995	
Grand Prix Manager 2	Edward Grabowski Communications	MicroProse	WIN	1996	
Grand Prix World	MicroProse	Hasbro Interactive	WIN	1999	
GT 64: Championship Edition	Imagineer	Ocean of America	N64	1998-04-14	
GTI Club	Konami		Arcade	1996	
Hang-On GP	Genki	Sega	SAT	1995-10-27	
Hanna Barbera's Turbo Toons	Empire Interactive		SNES	1994-10	
Hard Truck	ValuSoft		WIN	1998-04-20	
Hardcore 4X4	Gremlin Interactive	ASC Games	SAT, WIN, PS1	1996-11-30	
Harley-Davidson & L.A. Riders	Sega AM1	Sega	Arcade	1997-12	
Harley-Davidson: Race Across America	Canopy Games	WizardWorks Software	WIN, GBC	1999	
Hashire Hebereke	Sunsoft		SNES, WIN	1994-12-22	
Hi-Octane	Bullfrog Productions	Electronic Arts	DOS, PS1, SAT	1995-08	
High Velocity	Cave	Atlus, Sega	SAT	1995-11-10	
Highway 2000 / Wangan Dead Heat	Genki	Pack-In-Video	SAT	1995-12-15	
Highway Patrol 2	Microids		ATRST, AMI, DOS	1991	
Hot Wheels Stunt Track Driver	Mattel, Lucky Chicken Games	THQ	WIN, GBC	1998-10-15	
Hot Wheels Turbo Racing	Stormfront Studios	Electronic Arts	N64, PS1	1999-05-11	
HoverRace	GrokkSoft		WIN	1996	
Hydro Thunder	Midway Games		Arcade	1999	
Hyperdrive	Atari Games	Midway Manufacturing Co.	Arcade	1998	
Iggy's Reckin' Balls	Iguana Entertainment	Acclaim Entertainment	N64	1998-07-31	
Ignition	Unique Development Studios	Virgin Interactive	DOS, WIN	1997	
Indy 500	Sega AM1	Sega	Arcade, GCOM, RZ	1995-07-15	
IndyCar Racing	Papyrus Design Group	Virgin Interactive	DOS	1993	
IndyCar Racing II	Papyrus Design Group		DOS, MAC, WIN	1995	
International Rally Championship	Europress	Europress, Interplay Entertainment, THQ	WIN, PS1	1997-09-22	
Interstate '76	Activision		WIN	1997-02-28	
Interstate 82	Activision	Activision	WIN	1999-11-22	
Jaguar XJ220	Core Design		AMI, SCD	1992	
Jambo! Safari	Sega AM2, Sega AM3	Sega	Arcade, Wii, DS	1999	
Jeep Jamboree: Off Road Adventure	Gremlin Interactive	Virgin Interactive	GB	1992-07	
Jeff Gordon XS Racing	Natsume Co., Ltd.	ASC Games	WIN, GBC	1999-05-31	
Jeremy McGrath Supercross 98	Atod, Probe Entertainment	Acclaim Sports	PS1	1998-06-22	
Jet Moto	SingleTrac	Sony Computer Entertainment	WIN, PS1, PSN	1996-10-31	
Jet Moto 2	SingleTrac	Sony Computer Entertainment	PS1, PSN	1997-10-31	
Jet Moto 3	Pacific Coast Power & Light	989 Sports	PS1	1999-09-16	
Jikkyō GI Stable	Konami		N64	1999-04-28	
Jissen Kyōtei	Aisystem Tokyo	Imagineer	SNES	1995-06-23	
Kat's Run: Zen-Nippon K Car Senshuken	Atlus	Sega	SNES	1995-07-14	
Kattobi Tune	Genki	Genki	PS1	1998-04-23	
Kawasaki Caribbean Challenge	Park Place Productions	GameTek	SNES	1993-06	
Kawasaki Superbike Challenge	Lankhor	Time Warner Interactive	GEN, SNES, GG	1994	
Killer Loop	VCC Entertainment, Cybermind	Crave Entertainment	WIN, PS1, DC, Arcade	1999-02	
Kingdom Grand Prix	Raizing	Eighting	Arcade, SAT	1994-09	
Knight Rider Special	Pack-In Video Co.		PCE	1994-11-16	
Kyle Petty's No Fear Racing	Leland Interactive Media	Williams Entertainment	SNES	1995-04	
Lamborghini American Challenge	Titus France		SNES, AMI, AMI32, GB, WIN, DOS	1994	
Le Mans 24	Sega		Arcade	1997-09	
Le Mans 24 Hours	Eutechnyx; Infogrames Melbourne House; Torus Games	Infogrames	WIN, PS1, GBC, DC, PS2	1999-11-26	
Legend of Bishin, The	Magifact		SNES	1993-12-25	
Lego Racers	High Voltage Software	Lego Media	WIN, N64, PS1, GBC	1999-07-31	
Locus	Zombie Studios	GT Interactive	WIN	1995	
Lotus Esprit Turbo Challenge	Magnetic Fields	Gremlin Graphics	AMI, AMI32, CPC, ATRST, C64, ZX	1990	
Lotus III: The Ultimate Challenge	Magnetic Fields	Gremlin Graphics	AMI, AMI32, ATRST, DOS, GEN	1992	
Lotus Turbo Challenge 2	Magnetic Fields	Gremlin Graphics	AMI, AMI32, ATRST, ARC, GEN	1991	
Lucky & Wild	Namco		Arcade	1992-12	
Mad Trax	RayLand Interactive	Project Two Interactive BV	WIN	1998	
Manic Karts	Manic Media Productions	Virgin Interactive	DOS	1995	
Manx TT Super Bike	Sega AM3, Sega AM4	Sega	Arcade, SAT, WIN	1995-11-28	
Mario Andretti Racing	Stormfront Studios	EA Sports	GEN	1994	
Mario Andretti's Racing Challenge	Distinctive Software	Electronic Arts	WIN	1991	
Mario Kart 64	Nintendo EAD	Nintendo	N64, Wii, WiiU, NX	1996-12-14	
Matrix Marauders	Psygnosis	Psyclapse	AMI, ATRST	1990	
Mega Man Battle & Chase	Capcom	Capcom; Infogrames	PS1	1997-03-20	
MegaRace	Cryo Interactive	The Software Toolworks	DOS, SCD, 3DO	1993	
MegaRace 2	Cryo Interactive	Mindscape	DOS	1996-08-31	
Michael Andretti's Indy Car Challenge	Genki	Bullet Proof Software	SNES	1994-09	
Michael Andretti's World GP	Human Entertainment	Varie, Sammy Corporation	NES	1990-06	
Mickey's Racing Adventure	Rare	Nintendo	GBC	1999-11-22	
Micro Machines	Codemasters, Infogrames Sheffield House	Codemasters, Infogrames	NES, AMI, GG, SMS, GEN, DOS, CDI, SNES, GB, PS2, XBOX, GBA	1991	
Micro Machines 2: Turbo Tournament	Superior Software, Codemasters	Codemasters	GEN, DOS, GG, SNES, GB	1994-11	
Micro Machines V3	Codemasters	Midway Games	WIN, PS1, N64, GBC	1997-03	
Midtown Madness	Angel Studios	Microsoft	WIN	1999-02-27	
Mobil 1 Rally Championship	Magnetic Fields, Creative Asylum Limited	Actualize, Ubisoft, Europress Software	WIN, PS1	1999-11-19	
Monaco Grand Prix	Ubi Soft Paris	Ubi Soft	WIN, DC, N64, PS1	1999	
Monster Truck Madness	Terminal Reality	Microsoft Game Studios	WIN	1996-08-31	
Monster Truck Madness 2	Terminal Reality	Microsoft Games, Rockstar Games	WIN, N64	1998-04-30	
Monster Truck Rally	Realtime Associates	INTV Corporation	NES	1991	
Moto Racer	SK Software International	Electronic Arts	WIN, PS1	1997-08-31	
Moto Racer 2	Delphine Software International	Electronic Arts	WIN, PS1	1998-07-21	
Motocross Championship	Artech Studios	Sega	S32X	1994	
Motocross Go!	Namco		Arcade	1998	
Motocross Madness (1998)	Rainbow Studios	Microsoft Games	WIN	1998-08-14	
Motor City Patrol	Source Research & Development	Matchbox	NES	1992-01	
Motor Psycho	BlueSky Software	Atari Corporation	ATR78	1990	
Motor Raid	Sega		Arcade	1997-10	
Motor Toon Grand Prix	Poly's	Sony Computer Entertainment	PS1	1994-12-16	
Motor Toon Grand Prix 2	Polys Entertainment	Sony Computer Entertainment	PS1	1996-05-24	
Motorhead	EA Digital Illusions CE	Gremlin Interactive, Fox Interactive	WIN, PS1	1998-04	
Mountain Bike Rally	Radical Entertainment	ASC Games	SNES	1994-11	
MRC: Multi-Racing Championship	Genki	Imagineer, Ocean Software	N64	1997-07-18	
Nakajima Satoru F-1 Hero '94	Varie		SNES	1994-09-22	
Nakajima Satoru Kanshū F1 Super License	Varie		GEN	1992-12-11	
Naniwa Wangan Battle	Mitsui & Co.	MTO	PS1	1998-03-26	
NASCAR 98	EA Sports		SAT, PS1	1997-11-13	
NASCAR 99	EA Sports, Stormfront Studios	EA Sports	N64, PS1	1998-09-11	
NASCAR Legends	Papyrus Design Group	Sierra Sports	WIN	1999	
NASCAR Racing	Papyrus Design Group	Papyrus Design Group, Sierra	DOS, PS1, MAC	1994	
NASCAR Racing 1999 Edition	Papyrus Design Group	Sierra Sports	WIN	1999	
NASCAR Racing 2	Papyrus Design Group		WIN, DOS, MAC	1996	
NASCAR Racing 3	Papyrus Design Group	Sierra Entertainment	WIN	1999-10-12	
NASCAR Revolution	Stormfront Studios	EA Sports, Electronic Arts	WIN	1999-01-31	
Need for Speed II	Electronic Arts		WIN, PS1	1997-03-31	
Need for Speed III: Hot Pursuit	Electronic Arts		WIN, PS1	1998-09-30	
Need for Speed, The	Pioneer Productions	Electronic Arts	3DO, DOS, PS1, SAT	1994-12	
Need for Speed: High Stakes	EA Canada, EA Seattle	Electronic Arts	WIN, PS1	1999-03-18	
Neo Drift Out: New Technology	Visco Corporation	SNK	Arcade, NEOCD	1996-03-28	
Network Q RAC Rally	Pixelcraft	Accolade	DOS, FMT, PC98	1993	
Network Q RAC Rally Championship	Magnetic Fields	Europress	DOS, WIN	1996-07-06	
Newman/Haas IndyCar featuring Nigel Mansell	Gremlin Interactive	Acclaim Entertainment	SNES, GEN	1994-11	
Nigel Mansell's World Championship Racing	Gremlin Graphics	GameTek	AMI, AMI32, CPC, ATRST, GB, DOS, NES, GEN, SNES, ZX	1992	
Nitro	Psygnosis		AMI, ATRST	1990	
No Fear Downhill Mountain Biking	Unique Development Studios	Codemasters	PS1, GBC	1999	
No Second Prize	Thalion Software		AMI, ATRST	1992	
Off Road Challenge	Midway Games		Arcade	1997	
Off-World Interceptor	Crystal Dynamics		3DO, SAT, PS1	1994	
Official Formula One Racing	Lankhor	Eidos Interactive	WIN	1999	
Offroad Thunder	Midway Games		Arcade, PS2, XBOX, GCN	1999-09-21	
Option Tuning Car Battle	MTO	MTO	PS1	1998-01-15	
Option Tuning Car Battle 2	MTO	Jaleco	PS1	1999-02-18	
OutRun Europa	Sega	Probe Software, U.S. Gold	AMI, CPC, ATRST, C64, GG, SMS, ZX	1991	
OutRun 2019	SIMS Co., Ltd.	Sega	GEN	1993-03-26	
OutRunners	Sega AM1	Sega	Arcade, GEN	1992-05-15	
Over Top	ADK	SNK	Arcade, NEO, NEOCD, NX, PS4, XOne	1996-04-26	
Overtake	Zoom		X68K	1992-11-13	
Peak Performance	Cave	Atlus, Sega	PS1	1997-01-22	
Pen Pen TriIcelon	Land Ho!, General Entertainment	Infogrames North America	DC	1998-11-27	
Penny Racers	Locomotive Games	THQ	N64	1998-07-17	
Plane Crazy	Inner Workings	Europress	WIN, PS1	1998-09-30	
Pocket Racer	Namco		Arcade	1996	
POD: Planet of Death	Ubisoft		WIN	1997-02-28	
Porsche Challenge	London Studio	Sony Computer Entertainment	PS1	1997-04	
Power Drive	Rage Software	U.S. Gold	AMI, AMI32, GG, DOS, GEN, SNES	1994	
Power Drive Rally	Rage Software	Time Warner Interactive	JAG	1995-06	
Power Rangers Zeo: Battle Racers	Natsume Co., Ltd.	Bandai	SNES	1996-09-17	
Powerband	Gordon J. Key	The Fourth Dimension	ARC	1990	
Powerslide	Ratbag Games	GT Interactive	WIN	1998-10	
Prop Cycle	Namco		Arcade	1996	
Quad Challenge	Now Production	Namco	GEN	1991-08-06	
Quarantine	Imagexcel	GameTek	DOS	1994	
Quattro Power Machines	Codemasters, Optimus Software	Codemasters	AMI, ATRST	1993	
R.C. Grand Prix	Absolute Entertainment		SMS	1990	
R.C. Pro-Am II	Rare	Tradewest	NES	1992-12	
R4: Ridge Racer Type 4	Namco		PS1	1998-12-01	
Race America	Imagineering	Absolute Entertainment	NES	1990	
Race Days	Gremlin Interactive	GameTek	GB	1994-11	
Race Drivin'	Atari Games		Arcade	1990	
Racing	Tamsoft	Culture Publishers, A1 Games, Midas Interactive Entertainment	PS1	1999-07-22	
Racing Damashii	Irem		GB, PCE	1991-02-28	
Racing Lagoon	Square Enix	Square	PS1	1999-06-10	
Racing Simulation 2	Ubisoft		WIN, DC, N64, PS1	1998	
Rad Mobile	Sega AM2	Sega	Arcade, SAT	1991	
Radikal Bikers	Gaelco, Bit Managers	Atari Games, SNK, Infogrames	Arcade, PS1	1998-05-18	
Rage Racer	Namco		PS1	1996-11-03	
Rally Challenge 2000	Genki, Xicat Interactive	SouthPeak Games	N64	1999-08-06	
Rally Cross	Sony Computer Entertainment		PS1	1997-01-31	
Rally Cross 2	Idol Minds, Cherry Leisure	989 Studios	PS1, Arcade	1998-10-31	
Rapid Racer	Sony Computer Entertainment		PS1	1997-10	
Rave Racer	Namco		Arcade	1995-07-16	
Ray Tracers	Taito	THQ	PS1, PSN	1997-01-17	
Re-Volt	Acclaim Studios London, Big Bit, WeGo Interactive	Acclaim Entertainment, Throwback Entertainment, Big Bit, WeGo Interactive	WIN, PS1, N64, DC, iOS, DROID, Arcade	1999-03-09	
Red Zone	Psygnosis		AMI	1992	
Redline Racer / Suzuki Alstare Extreme Racing	Criterion Games	Ubisoft	WIN, DC, GBC	1998-07-31	
Ridge Racer	Namco		Arcade, PS1, PSP, MOBI, ZB	1993-10-30	
Ridge Racer 2	Namco		Arcade, PS1	1994-06-08	
Road Burners	Atari Games	Midway Games	Arcade	1999	
Road Rage/Speed King	Konami		Arcade, PS1	1995	
Road Rash	Papyrus Design Group	Electronic Arts	GEN	1991-09	
Road Rash 3	Electronic Arts		3DO, DOS, PS1, SAT	1995-05-15	
Road Rash 3D	Electronic Arts		PS1	1998-05-31	
Road Rash 64	Pacific Coast Power and Light	THQ	N64	1999-08-31	
Road Rash II	Electronic Arts		GEN	1993	
Road Riot 4WD	Atari Games		Arcade	1991	
Roadsters	Titus Interactive		N64, PS1, DC, GBC	1999-10-30	
Rock & Roll Racing 2: Red Asphalt	Interplay	Interplay	PS1	1998-1-13	
Rock n' Roll Racing	Silicon & Synapse	Interplay Entertainment	SNES, GEN, GBA	1993-06-04	
Rogue Trip: Vacation 2012	SingleTrac	GT Interactive	PS1	1998-10-6	
Rollcage	Attention to Detail	Psygnosis	WIN, PS1	1999-03-24	
Rough Racer	Sega		Arcade	1990	
RPM Racing	Silicon & Synapse	Interplay Entertainment	SNES	1991-10	
Runabout	Climax Entertainment	Media Rings	PS1, PS2, DC, 3DS	1997	
Running Wild	Blue Shift Inc.	989 Studios	PS1	1998-10-07	
Rush 2: Extreme Racing USA	Atari Games	Midway Games	N64	1998-10-10	
Rush Hour	Clockwork Entertainment	Psygnosis	PS1, WIN	1997	
S.C.A.R.S.	Vivid Image	Ubisoft	WIN, PS1, N64	1998-08-31	
S40 Racing	Digital Illusions CE	Volvo Cars	WIN	1997-10	
San Francisco Rush	Atari Games	Midway Games	Arcade	1996	
San Francisco Rush 2049	Midway Games		Arcade	1999	
San Francisco Rush: Extreme Racing	Atari Games	Midway Games	Arcade, WIN, N64, PS1, PS2, XBOX, GCN	1996-12-24	
Satoru Nakajima F-1 Hero 2	Human Entertainment	Varie	NES	1991-09-27	
Satoru Nakajima F-1 Hero GB World Championship '91	Natsu System	Varie	GB	1991-12-27	
Scorcher	Reto-Moto	Acclaim Entertainment, Scavenger, Inc.	DOS, WIN, SAT	1996-11-30	
Screamer	Graffiti	Virgin Interactive, Interplay	DOS, MAC, WIN	1995-10-31	
Screamer 2	Milestone	Virgin Interactive Entertainment	WIN, DOS	1996-09-30	
Screamer Rally	Milestone	Virgin Interactive	WIN, DOS	1997	
SCUD Race	Sega AM2	Sega	Arcade	1996-01	
SD F-1 Grand Prix	Video System		SNES	1995-10-27	
Sega Game Pack 4 in 1	Sega		GG	1991	
Sega Rally 2	Sega AM5	Sega	Arcade, DC	1998-02-28	
Sega Rally Championship	Sega AM5	Sega	Arcade, SAT, WIN, NGE, GBA	1994-10-11	
Sega Touring Car Championship	Sega AM Annex	Sega	Arcade, SAT, WIN	1996-09-08	
Shutokou Battle Gaiden: Super Technic Challenge	Mitsui & Co.	MediaQuest	PS1	1996-12-20	
Shutokou Battle R	Genki	Genki	PS1	1997-04-25	
Skitchin'	Electronic Arts		GEN	1994	
SkyRoads	Bluemoon	Creative Dimensions	DOS	1993	
Sled Storm	EA Canada	Electronic Arts	PS1	1999-07-31	
Slipstream 5000	The Software Refinery	Gremlin Interactive	DOS	1995	
Snowboard Kids	Racjin	Atlus, Sega	N64, PS1	1997-12-12	
Snowboard Kids 2	Racjin	Atlus, Sega	N64	1999-02-19	
SODA Off-Road Racing	Software Allies	Sierra	DOS, WIN	1997	
Sonic Drift	Sega		GG	1994-03-18	
Sonic Drift 2	Sega		GG	1995-03-17	
Sonic R	Traveller's Tales, Sonic Team	Sega	SAT, WIN, PS2, GCN	1997-11-18	
South Park Rally	Tantalus Media	Acclaim Entertainment	WIN, PS1, N64, DC	1999-12-13	
Speed Busters	Ubi Soft Montreal	Ubi Soft	WIN, DC, MOBI	1998-11-23	
Speed Demons	EMG	Microïds	WIN	1999	
Speed Freaks	Funcom	Sony Computer Entertainment	PS1	1999-09-15	
Speed Haste	NoriaWorks Entertainment	Friendware	DOS	1995	
Speed Power Gunbike	Inti Creates	Sony Music Entertainment Japan	PS1	1998-04-23	
Speed Racer	Namco		Arcade	1995-10-07	
Speed Racer (1996)	Graphic Research	Jaleco, Tomy	PS1	1996-09-27	
Speed Racer in My Most Dangerous Adventures	Radical Entertainment	Accolade	SNES	1994-11	
Speed Racer in The Challenge of Racer X	Accolade		DOS, GEN	1992	
Sports Car GT	Image Space, Westwood Studios	Electronic Arts	WIN	1999-04-30	
Sports Collection	Tose	Tonkin House	GB	1996-09-27	
Star Wars Episode I: Racer	LucasArts		WIN, N64, GBC, MAC, DC, NX	1999-05-18	
Starwinder	Mindscape	Mindscape, J-Wing	PS1	1996-10-31	
Street Racer	Vivid Image	Ubi Soft	SNES, GEN, GB, SAT, PS1, AMI, AMI32, WIN	1994-11	
Street Rod 2	P.Z.Karen Co. Development Group, Logical Design Works	California Dreams	AMI, C64, DOS	1991	
Streets of SimCity	Maxis		WIN	1997	
Stunt Driver	Sphere, Inc.	Spectrum HoloByte	DOS	1990	
Stunt Race FX	Nintendo EAD, Argonaut Games	Nintendo	SNES	1994-06-04	
Stunts	Distinctive Software	Mindscape, Broderbund	DOS, AMI, PC98	1990	
Super Burnout	Shen Technologies SARL	Atari Corporation	JAG	1995-07-05	
Super Cars	Magnetic Fields	Gremlin Graphics	AMI, ATRST, CPC, C64, MSX, NES, ZX	1990	
Super Cars II	Magnetic Fields	Gremlin Graphics	ATRST, AMI, DOS	1991	
Super Chase: Criminal Termination	Taito	Square Enix	Arcade	1992	
Super Drift Out	Dragnet	Visco Corporation	SNES	1995-02-24	
Super Kyotei	Nichibutsu	Nichibutsu	SNES	1995-06-30	
Super Mad Champ	Givro	Tsukuda Original	SNES	1995-03-04	
Super Mario Kart	Nintendo EAD	Nintendo	SNES, 3DS, WiiU, NX	1992-08-27	
Super R.C. Pro-Am	Rare	Nintendo	GB	1991-06	
Super Skidmarks	Acid Software, Codemasters	Acid Software, CDS Software	AMI, AMI32, GEN	1995	
Supercross 2000	MBL Research	Electronic Arts	N64, PS1	1999-10-31	
Supercross 3D	Tiertex Design Studios	Atari Corporation	JAG	1995-12-15	
SuperKarts	Manic Media	Virgin Interactive	DOS	1995	
Supersonic Racers	Supersonic Software	Mindscape	PS1	1996-10-31	
Suzuka 8 Hours	Namco	Arc System Works	Arcade, SNES	1992-10-10	
Suzuka 8 Hours 2	Namco	Arc System Works	Arcade	1993-11-04	
Tank Racer	Square Enix Europe	Grolier, R&P Electronic Media	WIN, PS1	1999-03-30	
Team Losi RC Racer	Gremlin Interactive	Fox Interactive	WIN, PS1	1998	
Team Suzuki	Gremlin Graphics		AMI, ATRST, DOS	1991	
Test Drive 4	Pitbull Syndicate	Accolade	WIN, PS1	1997-09-30	
Test Drive 5	Pitbull Syndicate	Accolade	WIN, PS1	1998-09-30	
Test Drive 6	Pitbull Syndicate	Infogrames North America, Cryo Interactive	WIN, PS1, GBC, DC	1999-10-31	
Test Drive III: The Passion	Accolade		DOS	1990-04	
Test Drive: Off-Road	Elite Systems	Accolade, Eidos Interactive	WIN, PS1	1997-02	
Test Drive: Off-Road 2	Pitbull Syndicate	Accolade, Electronic Arts	WIN, PS1	1998-09-30	
Test Drive: Off-Road 3	Infogrames North America, Xantera	Infogrames North America, Infogrames Multimedia	WIN, PS1, GBC	1999-10-31	
Thrash Rally	ADK		Arcade, NEO, NEOCD, NX, PS4, XOne	1991-11-08	
Thrill Drive	Konami		Arcade	1998	
Thunder Truck Rally	Reflections Interactive	Psygnosis	WIN, PS1	1997-05-31	
TNN Motorsports Hardcore Heat	CRI	ASC Games	DC	1999-08-07	
TOCA 2 Touring Cars	Codemasters		WIN, PS1	1998-12	
TOCA Touring Car Championship	Codemasters	3DO	WIN, PS1, GBC	1997-11	
Tokyo Highway Battle	Genki	Jaleco	PS1, SAT	1996-05-03	
Tokyo Road Race				1996	
Tokyo Xtreme Racer	Genki	Crave Entertainment	DC	1999-06-24	
Top Gear	Gremlin	Kemco	SNES	1992-04-16	
Top Gear 2	Gremlin Interactive	Kemco	SNES, GEN, AMI, AMI32	1993-08-08	
Top Gear 3000	Gremlin	Kemco	SNES	1995-02	
Top Gear Overdrive	Snowblind Studios	Kemco	N64	1998-11-23	
Top Gear Pocket	Vision Works	Kemco	GBC	1999-03-25	
Top Gear Rally	Boss Game Studios	Midway Games	N64, GBC, GBA	1997-10	
Top Gear Rally 2	Saffire	Kemco	N64, GBC	1999-12-03	
TORCS	Bernhard Wymann	Microsoft	LIN, BSD, MAC, AmiOS, WIN	1997	
Total Drivin	Eutechnyx	Activision	PS1	1997-09-30	
Toyota Celica GT	Gremlin Interactive		AMI, CPC, DOS, ZX	1990	
TrickStyle	Criterion Games	Acclaim Entertainment	WIN, DC	1999	
Twisted Metal	989 Studios; SingleTrac	Sony Computer Entertainment	PS1, WIN	1995-11-10	
Twisted Metal 2	989 Studios; SingleTrac	Sony Computer Entertainment	PS1, WIN	1996-11-8	
Twisted Metal 4	989 Studios	Sony Computer Entertainment	PS1	1999-11-16	
Twisted Metal III	989 Studios	989 Studios	PS1	1998-11-10	
Uchuu Race: Astro Go! Go!	KAZe	Meldac	SNES	1994-02-25	
Ultimate Race Pro	Kalisto Entertainment	MicroProse	WIN	1997	
Uniracers	DMA Design	Nintendo	SNES	1994-12	
V-Rally	Infogrames, Inskor	Electronic Arts	WIN, PS1, GBC, N64	1997-07	
V-Rally 2	Eden Studios	Infogrames, Electronic Arts, Spike	WIN, PS1, DC	1999-06-30	
V-Rally: Edition 99	Eden Studios	Infogrames, Electronic Arts	WIN, N64	1998-12-07	
Vangers	K-D Lab	Interactive Magic	WIN, MAC, LIN, BSD	1998-06	
Vigilante 8	LuxoFlux	Activision	PS1, N64, GBC	1998-01-06	
Viper Racing	Monster Games	Sierra Entertainment	WIN	1998	
Virtua Racing	Sega AM2	Sega	Arcade, GEN, S32X, SAT, WIN, PS2	1992-08	
Virtua Racing Deluxe	Sega AM2	Sega, Sega Sports	S32X	1994	
Virtual Karts	MPS Labs	MicroProse	DOS	1995	
VMX Racing	Studio e	Playmates Interactive Ent.	PS1	1997	
VR Sports Powerboat Racing	Promethean Designs	VR Sports	WIN, PS1	1998	
Vroom	Lankhor		AMI	1991	
Wacky Wheels	Beavis Soft	Apogee Software	DOS	1994-10-17	
Wave Race	Nintendo EAD	Nintendo	GB	1992-07	
Wave Race 64	Nintendo EAD	Nintendo	N64	1996-09-27	
Wipeout	Psygnosis		WIN, DOS, PS1, SAT	1995-09-29	
Wipeout 2097	Psygnosis		WIN, PS1, SAT, AmiOS, MAC, AMI	1996-09-30	
Wipeout 3	Psygnosis		PS1	1999-09-08	
Wipeout 64	Psygnosis	Midway Games	N64	1998-11-10	
World Driver Championship	Boss Game Studios	Midway	N64	1999-05-31	
World Rally Fever	Team17	Ocean Software	WIN, DOS	1996	
World Tour Racing	Krisalis Software	Telegames	JAGCD	1997-06	
XCar: Experimental Racing	Bad Dog	Bethesda Softworks	DOS	1997	
Xtreme Racing	Tuna Technologies	Black Magic Software	AMI	1995	
Zero4 Champ DooZy-J Type-R	Media Rings		WIN, PS1, PS3, PSP, PSV, PSN	1997-06-20	
Zero4 Champ RR	Media Rings		SNES	1994-07-22	
Zero4 Champ RR-Z	Media Rings		SNES	1995-11-25	
Zone Raiders	Image Space Incorporated	Virgin Interactive	DOS, MAC	1995-11-30	

=== 2000s ===
Title	Developer	Publisher	Platforms	Release date	Ref.
007 Racing	Eutechnyx	EA Games	PS1	2000-11-20	
18 Wheeler: American Pro Trucker	Sega AM2; Acclaim Studios Cheltenham	Sega; Acclaim Entertainment	Arcade, DC, PS2, GCN	2000-07-26	
18 Wheels of Steel	SCS Software	ValuSoft	WIN	2002-08-31	
18 Wheels of Steel: Haulin'	SCS Software	ValuSoft	WIN	2006-12-08	
187 Ride or Die	Ubisoft Paris	Ubisoft	PS2, XBOX	2005-08-23	
2 Fast 2 Furious	Digital Bridges	dbi Games	MOBI	2004	
2XL ATV Offroad	2XL Games		iOS	2009-10-08	
2XL Supercross	2XL Games		iOS	2009-04-01	
4 Wheel Thunder	Kalisto Entertainment	Midway Games	DC	2000-05-04	
4x4 EVO 2	Terminal Reality	Gathering of Developers; Universal Interactive; BAM! Entertainment	WIN, PS2, XBOX, GCN	2001-10-30	
4x4 Evolution	Terminal Reality	Gathering of Developers	WIN, PS2, DC, MAC	2000-10-29	
Crash Time III	Synetic	RTL	WIN, X360	2009-11-27	
Alfa Romeo Racing Italiano	Milestone	Valcon Games, Black Bean Games	WIN, PS2, XBOX	2005-06-24	
All Star Racing 2	Mud Duck Productions	Midas Interactive, Kung Fu Games	PS1	2003-04-24	
American Chopper 2: Full Throttle	Activision Value	Creat Studios	PS2, XBOX, GCN	2005-11-20	
American Chopper	Activision Value	Creat Studios	WIN, PS2, XBOX	2004-11-25	
Antz Extreme Racing	Supersonic Software	Empire Interactive	WIN, PS2, XBOX, GBA	2002-07-26	
APEX / Racing Evoluzione	Milestone	Infogrames	XBOX	2003-02-18	
Aqua Moto Racing	Resolution Interactive		iOS	2009-03-07	
Arctic Thunder	Midway Games		Arcade, PS2, XBOX	2000-12-01	
Armagetron Advanced	Dave Fancella	Codemasters	WIN, OSX, LIN	2001	
Asphalt 3: Street Rules	Gameloft Shanghai	Gameloft	WMO, SYM, DROID	2006	
Asphalt 4: Elite Racing	Gameloft Paris	Gameloft	BB10, iOS, SYM, DS	2008-08-28	
Asphalt 5	Gameloft Bucharest	Gameloft	iOS, webOS, DROID, SYM, Bada, WP	2009-11-02	
Asphalt Urban GT	Gameloft Paris Gameloft Montreal	Gameloft	MOBI, NGE, DS	2004-11-15	
Asphalt: Urban GT 2	Gameloft Montreal, Virtuos	Gameloft	MOBI, NGE, DS, PSP	2005-11-30	
ATV Offroad Fury	Rainbow Studios	Sony Computer Entertainment	PS2	2001-02-05	
ATV Offroad Fury 2	Rainbow Studios	Sony Computer Entertainment	PS2	2002-11-09	
ATV Offroad Fury 3	Climax Studios	NA: Sony Computer Entertainment; EU: SouthPeak Games	PS2	2004-11-02	
ATV Offroad Fury 4	Climax Racing	Sony Computer Entertainment	PS2	2006-10-31	
ATV Offroad Fury Pro	Climax Racing	Sony Computer Entertainment	PSP	2006-10-26	
ATV Offroad Fury: Blazin' Trails	Climax Studios	Sony Computer Entertainment, SouthPeak Games	PSP	2005-04-19	
ATV: Quad Frenzy	Skyworks Technologies	Majesco	DS	2005-11-14	
ATV: Quad Power Racing	Climax Development; Tantalus	Acclaim Sports	PS1, GBA	2000-08-23	
ATV: Quad Power Racing 2	Climax Brighton	AKA Acclaim	PS2, XBOX, GCN	2003-01-13	
Audiosurf	Dylan Fitterer	Valve	WIN, Zune	2008-02-15	
Auto Modellista	Capcom Production Studio 1	Capcom	PS2, XBOX, GCN	2002-08-22	
Auxiliary Power's Demolition Derby and Figure 8 Race	Auxiliary Power, John C. Ardussi	Auxiliary Power	WIN	2001-10-01	
Baja: Edge of Control	2XL Games	THQ	PS3, X360	2008-09-22	
Ballistics	Grin	Xicat Interactive	Arcade, LIN, WIN	2001-10-19	
Bandits: Phoenix Rising	Grin	Pan Vision, Tri Synergy	WIN	2002-10-04	
Banjo-Pilot	Rare	THQ	GBA	2005-01-12	
Batman: Gotham City Racer	Sinister Games	Ubi Soft	PS1	2001-04-19	
Battle Gear 3	Taito		Arcade, PS2	2002-11	
Battle Gear 3 Tuned	Taito		PS2, Arcade	2003-12-15	
Battle Gear 4	Taito		Arcade	2005-07	
Battle Gear 4 Tuned	Taito		Arcade	2005-07	
Beam Breakers	Similis	JoWooD Productions	WIN	2002-09-27	
Beetle Crazy Cup	Xpiral	Infogrames	WIN	2000-02	
Big Air Freestyle	Paradigm Entertainment	Infogrames	GCN	2002-09-13	
Big Bumpin'	Blitz Games	King Games	XBOX, X360	2006-11-19	
Big Mutha Truckers	Eutechnyx	Empire Interactive; THQ	WIN, PS2, XBOX, GCN, GBA, DS	2002-11-27	
Big Mutha Truckers 2: Truck Me Harder	Eutechnyx	Empire Interactive; THQ	WIN, PS2, XBOX	2005-06-24	
Big Rigs: Over the Road Racing	Stellar Stone	GameMill Publishing	WIN	2003-11-20	
Big Scale Racing	BumbleBeast	Codemasters	WIN	2002	
Bigfoot: Collision Course	Destination Software	Zoo Games	WIN, DS, Wii	2008-10-28	
Biker Mice from Mars	Creat Studios	The Game Factory	PS2, DS	2006-11-17	
Billy the Wizard: Rocket Broomstick Racing	Data Design Interactive	Conspiracy Entertainment	WIN, Wii, PS2	2006-01-27	
BMX XXX	Z-Axis	AKA Acclaim	PS2, XBOX, GCN	2002-11-12	
Bomberman Kart	Racjin	Hudson Soft	PS2	2001-12-20	
Build 'n Race	Icon Games Entertainment	Zoo Games	Wii	2009-08-04	
Burning Tires 3D	Deep Silver	Deep Silver Fishlabs	iOS, DROID, SYM	2009-01-13	
Crash Time II	Synetic GmbH	RTL Interactive	WIN, X360	2008-11-27	
Burnout	Criterion Games	Acclaim Entertainment	PS2, XBOX, GCN	2001-11-01	
Burnout 2: Point of Impact	Criterion Games	Acclaim Entertainment	PS2, XBOX, GCN	2002-09-30	
Burnout 3: Takedown	Criterion Games	Electronic Arts	PS2, XBOX	2004-09-07	
Burnout Dominator	EA UK	Electronic Arts	PS2, PSP	2007-03-06	
Burnout Legends	Criterion Games, Visual Impact	Electronic Arts	PSP, DS	2005-09-13	
Burnout Paradise	Criterion Games	Electronic Arts	WIN, PS3, X360	2008-01-22	
Burnout Revenge	Criterion Games	Electronic Arts	PS2, XBOX, X360	2005-09-13	
Bus Simulator/Bus Simulator 2008	Ice Bytes Game Development	GSP Software	WIN	2007-12-13	
Butt-Ugly Martians: Zoom or Doom	Runecraft	Vivendi Universal Games; Crave Entertainment	PS2, GCN	2002-12-06	
Buzz! Junior: Ace Racers	Cohort Studios	Sony Computer Entertainment	PS2	2008-10-24	
Cabela's 4x4 Off-Road Adventure	Fun Labs	Activision Value	WIN	2001-02	
Carmageddon TDR 2000	Torus Games	Sales Curve Interactive, Xicat Interactive	WIN	2000-09-01	
Cars	Locomotive Games, Rainbow Studios, Helixe, Beenox	THQ	WIN, PS2, XBOX, X360, GCN, Wii, GBA, DS, PSP, OSX	2006-06-06	
Cars Mater-National Championship	Rainbow Studios	THQ	WIN, PS2, PS3, X360, Wii, DS, GBA	2007-10-29	
Cars Race-O-Rama	Incinerator Studios, Tantalus Media	THQ	PS2, PS3, X360, Wii, PSP, DS	2009-10-12	
Cars: Radiator Springs Adventures	AWE Games, Rainbow Studios	THQ	WIN, OSX	2006-06-06	
CART Fury Championship Racing	Midway Games		Arcade, PS2	2000	
Cartoon Network Racing	Eutechnyx	The Game Factory	DS, PS2	2006-12-04	
Cartoon Network Speedway	DC Studios	Majesco	GBA	2003-11-17	
Carve	Argonaut Games	Global Star Software	XBOX	2004-02-24	
Castrol Honda VTR	Interactive Entertainment	Bubble Boy, Midas Games	PS1	2001-02-09	
Cel Damage	Pseudo Interactive	Electronic Arts|Play It	XBOX, GCN, PS2	2001-11-15	
Charinko Hero	Banpresto		GCN	2003-07-17	
Chase H.Q. 2	Taito	Square Enix	Arcade	2007-12	
Chase: Hollywood Stunt Driver	I-Imagine Interactive	BAM! Entertainment	XBOX	2002-09-25	
ChoroQ	Barnhouse Effect	Atlus	PS2	2003-11-27	
Chrysler Classic Racing	Extra Mile Studios	Zoo Entertainment	Wii, DS	2008-11-18	
Circus Maximus: Chariot Wars	Kodiak Interactive	Encore, Inc.	PS2, XBOX	2002-02-24	
Classic British Motor Racing	Data Design Interactive	Bold Games	WIN, PS2, Wii	2008-01-02	
Cocoto Kart Racer	Neko Entertainment	BigBen Interactive, Conspiracy Entertainment	WIN, GBA, GCN, DS, PS2, Wii	2005	
Colin McRae Rally 04	Codemasters		WIN, PS2, XBOX	2003-09-19	
Colin McRae Rally 2.0	Codemasters		WIN, PS1, GBA	2000-07-07	
Colin McRae Rally 2005	Codemasters		WIN, PS2, XBOX, OSX, PSP	2004-09-28	
Colin McRae Rally 3	Codemasters		WIN, PS2, XBOX	2002-10-25	
Colin McRae: Dirt	Codemasters		WIN, PS3, X360	2007-06-15	
Colin McRae: Dirt 2	Codemasters, Sumo Digital, Firebrand Games, Feral Interactive	Codemasters, SCEE, Namco Bandai, Feral Interactive	WIN, DS, PS3, PSP, Wii, X360, OSX	2009-09-08	
Corvette	Steel Monkeys, Visual Impact	TDK Mediactive, Global Star Software	WIN, GBA, PS2, XBOX	2003-11-11	
Corvette Evolution GT	Milestone	Valcon Games, Black Bean Games	WIN, PS2, DS	2006-05-12	
Crash 'N' Burn	Climax Racing	Eidos Interactive	PS2, XBOX	2004-11-15	
Crash Bandicoot Nitro Kart 3D	Polarbit	Activision	MOBI	2008-06-09	
Crash Nitro Kart	Vicarious Visions	Universal Interactive	PS2, XBOX, GCN, GBA, NGE, MOBI	2003-11-11	
Crash Tag Team Racing	Radical Entertainment	Vivendi Universal Games	PS2, XBOX, GCN, PSP	2005-10-19	
Crash Time: Autobahn Pursuit	Synetic GmbH	EU: RTL Interactive; NA: Crave Entertainment	WIN, X360	2007-11-07	
Crashday	Replay Studios, Moonbyte Games	Atari SA	WIN	2006-02-23	
Crazy Frog Racer	Neko Entertainment	Digital Jesters	WIN, PS2, DS, GBA	2005	
Crazy Frog Racer 2	Neko Entertainment	Valcon Games	WIN, PS2	2007-09-04	
Crazy Taxi 2	Hitmaker	Sega	DC, PSP	2001-05-28	
Crazy Taxi 3: High Roller	Hitmaker	Sega	WIN, XBOX, Arcade	2002-07-24	
Crazy Taxi: Fare Wars	Hitmaker, Sniper Studios	Sega	PSP	2007-08-07	
Crazyracing Kartrider	Nexon		WIN	2004-06-01	
Cro-Mag Rally	Pangea Software	Aspyr	MAC, OSX, iOS, WP, X360, DROID	2000-10	
Cross Racing Championship Extreme 2005	Invictus Games		WIN	2005	
Cruis'n	Just Games Interactive	Midway Games	Wii	2007-11-27	
Cruis'n Velocity	Graphic State	Midway Games	GBA	2001-11-30	
Crusty Demons	Climax Studios	Deep Silver	PS2, XBOX	2006-06-27	
Dakar 2: The World's Ultimate Rally	Acclaim Studios Cheltenham	Acclaim Entertainment	PS2, XBOX, GCN	2003-03-07	
Darkwind: War on Wheels	Sam Redfern	Psychic Software	LIN, WIN, OSX	2007-04-05	
Dash of Destruction	NinjaBee	Microsoft Game Studios	X360	2008-12-17	
Dave Mirra Freestyle BMX	Z-Axis	Acclaim Max Sports	WIN, PS1, GBC, DC	2000-09-26	
Dave Mirra Freestyle BMX 2	Z-Axis	Acclaim Max Sports	PS2, GCN, GBA, XBOX	2001-08-27	
Dave Mirra Freestyle BMX 3	Full Fat	AKA Acclaim	GBA	2002-11-26	
Days of Thunder	Piranha Games	Paramount Digital Entertainment	PS3, X360, iOS, PSP	2009-02-05	
Daytona USA 2001	Amusement Vision, Genki	Sega, Hasbro Interactive, Infogrames	DC	2000-12-21	
Death Track: Resurrection	SkyFallen Entertainment	1C Company	WIN, PS3, PSN	2008-02-22	
Deca Sports	Hudson Soft		Wii	2008-03-19	
Derby Tsuku 4: Derby Uma o Tsukurō!	Smilebit	Sega	PS2	2004-12-02	
Destruction Derby Arenas	Studio 33	SCEE	PS2	2004-01-09	
Destruction Derby Raw	Studio 33	SCEE, Midway Games	PS1	2000-06-30	
Dhaka Racing	eSophers		WIN	2002-03-02	
Die Hard Trilogy 2: Viva Las Vegas	N-Space	Fox Interactive	WIN, PS1	2000-02-29	
Digimon Racing	Griptonite Games	Bandai	GBA	2004-04-01	
Dirt Track Racing	Ratbag Games	WizardWorks Software	WIN	2000	
Dirt Track Racing 2	Ratbag Games		WIN	2002-09-01	
Dirt Track Racing: Sprint Cars	Ratbag Games	WizardWorks	WIN	2000	
Disney Magicboard Online	Shanda	The Walt Disney Company	WIN	2007-12-10	
Disney's Herbie: Fully Loaded	Climax Group	Buena Vista Games	GBA	2005-06-21	
Crash-Course Domo	NHK	Nintendo	DS	2009-10-19	
Donkey Kong Barrel Blast	Paon	Nintendo	Wii	2007-06-28	
Dotstream	Skip Ltd.	Nintendo	GBA	2006-07-13	
Downhill Domination	Incognito Entertainment	SCEA, Codemasters	PS2	2003-07-22	
Downtown Run	Ubi Soft Romania	Ubi Soft	WIN, PS2, GCN, MOBI	2003-03-28	
Drag Racer	XMG Studio, Phantom Games		iOS	2003	
DrawRace	RedLynx		iOS	2009	
Drift City	NPluto		WIN, iOS, DROID	2007-08-01	
Driift Mania	Konami		Wii	2009-07-31	
Driven	Crawfish Interactive	BAM! Entertainment	PS2, GCN, GBA	2001-11-06	
Driver 2	Reflections Interactive, Sennari Interactive	Infogrames	PS1, GBA	2000-11-13	
Driver 3	Reflections Interactive	Atari SA	WIN, PS2, XBOX, GBA	2004-06-21	
Driver 76	Sumo Digital, Ubisoft Reflections	Ubisoft	PSP	2007-05-08	
Driver: L.A. Undercover	Gameloft Montreal	Ubisoft	MOBI	2007-05-11	
Driver: Parallel Lines	Reflections Interactive	Atari SA, Ubisoft	WIN, PS2, XBOX, Wii	2006-03-14	
Driver: Vegas	Gameloft	Glu Mobile	MOBI	2006	
Driving Emotion Type-S	Escape	Square Electronic Arts	PS2	2000-03-30	
Drome Racers	Attention to Detail, Möbius Entertainment	Electronic Arts, Lego Interactive, THQ	WIN, GCN, GBA, PS2, XBOX	2002-11-20	
DT Racer	Axis Entertainment	XS Games	PS2, PSP	2005-09-26	
Ducati Moto	4J Studios	Bethesda Softworks	DS	2008-07-01	
The Dukes of Hazzard II: Daisy Dukes It Out	Sinister Games	SouthPeak Interactive	PS1	2000-11-07	
The Dukes of Hazzard: Return of the General Lee	Ratbag Games	Ubisoft	PS2, XBOX	2004-09-28	
E-racer	Rage Software		WIN	2001-04-27	
EA Sports NASCAR Racing	EA Tiburon	Global VR	Arcade	2007	
Earache: Extreme Metal Racing	Data Design Interactive		WIN, PS2, Wii	2006-10-27	
Elasto Mania	Balázs Rózsa	Independent	WIN, BEOS, iOS	2000-01	
Emergency Heroes	Ubisoft Reflections, Ubisoft Barcelona	Ubisoft	Wii	2008-05-27	
Enthusia Professional Racing	Konami		PS2	2005-03-17	
Euro Truck Simulator	SCS Software	Meridian4	WIN, OSX	2008-08-06	
Excite Truck	Monster Games	Nintendo	Wii	2006-11-19	
Excitebike 64	Left Field Productions	Nintendo	N64, WiiU	2000-04-30	
Excitebike: World Rally	Monster Games, Nintendo SPD	Nintendo	Wii	2009-11-09	
Excitebots: Trick Racing	Monster Games	Nintendo	Wii	2009-04-20	
Extreme-G 3	Acclaim Studios Cheltenham	Acclaim Entertainment	PS2, GCN	2001-08-21	
F-Zero AX	Amusement Vision	Sega	Arcade	2003-07	
F-Zero Climax	Suzak	Nintendo	GBA	2004-10-21	
F-Zero GX	Amusement Vision	Nintendo	GCN	2003-07-25	
F-Zero: GP Legend	Suzak	Nintendo	GBA	2003-11-28	
F-Zero: Maximum Velocity	NDcube	Nintendo	GBA	2001-03-21	
F1 2000	Image Space Incorporated, Visual Sciences	EA Sports	WIN, PS1	2000-01-06	
F1 2009	Sumo Digital	Codemasters	Wii, PSP, iOS	2009-11-17	
F1 Challenge '99-'02	Image Space Incorporated, Visual Science	EA Sports	WIN, MAC, PS1, PS2, XBOX, GCN, GBA	2003-06-24	
F1 Championship Season 2000	Image Space Incorporated, Visual Sciences	EA Sports	WIN, MAC, PS1, PS2, GBC	2000-09-30	
F1 Grand Prix	Traveller's Tales	Sony Computer Entertainment	PSP	2005-09-01	
F1 Manager	Intelligent Games	EA Sports	WIN	2000-10-13	
F1 Racing Championship	Video System	Ubi Soft	WIN, PS1, PS2, N64, DC, GBC	2000-04	
F1 World Grand Prix 2000	Eutechnyx	Eidos Interactive	WIN, PS1	2001-03-08	
Family Slot Car Racing	Arc System Works	Aksys Games	Wii	2009-02-10	
Fast & Furious	Firemint Pty	I-play	iOS	2009-03	
The Fast and the Furious	Eutechnyx	Namco Bandai Games	PS2, PSP	2006-09-26	
Fast and the Furious DRIFT, The	Raw Thrills		Arcade	2007	
Fast and the Furious: Super Bikes, The	Raw Thrills		Arcade	2006	
Faster Than Speed	Sega	Sammy Corporation	Arcade	2004	
Fatal Inertia	Koei		PS3, X360	2007-09-30	
Ferrari Challenge: Trofeo Pirelli	Eutechnyx, Firebrand Games	System 3	PS2, PS3, Wii, DS	2008-01-26	
Ferrari GT: Evolution	Gameloft Bucharest	Gameloft	iOS, MOBI, DS, SYM	2008	
Firebugs	Attention to Detail	Sony Computer Entertainment	PS1	2002-10-18	
Fired Up	London Studio	Sony Computer Entertainment	PSP	2005-09-01	
FlatOut	Bugbear Entertainment	Empire Interactive, Konami	WIN, PS2, XBOX	2004-11-05	
FlatOut 2	Bugbear Entertainment	Empire Interactive, Konami	WIN, PS2, XBOX, OSX	2006-06-30	
FlatOut: Ultimate Carnage	Bugbear Entertainment	Empire Interactive	X360, WIN, PSP	2007-07-22	
Ford Mustang: The Legend Lives	Eutechnyx	2K Games	PS2, XBOX	2005-04-19	
Ford Racing	Elite Systems, HME Inc.	Empire Interactive	Arcade, WIN, PS1	2000-11-02	
Ford Racing 2	Razorworks	Empire Interactive, Gotham Games	WIN, PS2, XBOX	2003-10-28	
Ford Racing 3	Razorworks	2K Games, Empire Interactive	WIN, PS2, XBOX, GBA, DS	2004-10-29	
Ford Racing Off Road	Razorworks	Xplosiv	WIN, PS2, PSP, Wii	2008-03-21	
Ford Street Racing	Razorworks	Empire Interactive	WIN, PS2, PSP, XBOX	2006-09-19	
Ford vs. Chevy	Eutechnyx	Global Star Software, 2K Games	PS2, XBOX	2005-11-09	
F1 2004	Studio Liverpool	SCEE	PS2	2004-09-22	
F1 2005	Studio Liverpool	SCEE	PS2	2005-07-01	
F1 2006	Studio Liverpool	SCEE	PS2, PSP	2006-07-28	
Formula One 2000	Studio 33	Midway Games	PS1, GBC	2000-10-04	
F1 2001	Studio 33, Studio Liverpool	Sony Computer Entertainment, 989 Studios	PS1, PS2	2001-04-20	
F1 2002	Studio Liverpool	SCEE	PS2	2002-11-01	
F1 2003	Studio Liverpool	SCEE	PS2	2003-07-11	
Formula One Arcade	Studio 33	Sony Computer Entertainment	PS1	2002-07-19	
Formula One Championship Edition	Studio Liverpool	SCEE	PS3	2006-12-28	
Forza Motorsport	Turn 10 Studios	Microsoft Game Studios	XBOX	2005-05-03	
Forza Motorsport 2	Turn 10 Studios	Microsoft Game Studios	X360	2007-05-24	
Forza Motorsport 3	Turn 10 Studios	Microsoft Game Studios	X360	2009-10-22	
Freaky Flyers	Midway Games		PS2, XBOX, GCN	2003-08-05	
Freekstyle	Page 44 Studios	EA Sports Big	PS2, GCN, GBA	2002-06-17	
Fuel	Asobo Studio	Codemasters	WIN, PS3, X360	2009-06-02	
Full Auto	Pseudo Interactive	Sega	X360	2006-02-10	
Full Auto 2: Battlelines	Pseudo Interactive	Sega	PS3, PSP	2006-12-07	
G-Surfers	Blade Interactive	Majesco	PS2	2002-01-25	
G1 Jockey	Koei		PS1, PS2, PS3, Wii	2001	
Gekitotsu Toma L'Arc: TomaRunner vs L'Arc-en-Ciel	SCEI		PS1	2000-07-19 d1	
Glimmerati	Bugbear Entertainment	Nokia	NGE	2005-07-07	
GP Challenge	Midas Interactive Entertainment		PS1	2002-04-12	
Gran Turismo Portable	Polyphony Digital	Sony Computer Entertainment	PSP	2009-10-01	
Gran Turismo 3: A-Spec	Polyphony Digital	Sony Computer Entertainment	PS2	2001-04-28	
Gran Turismo 4	Polyphony Digital	Sony Computer Entertainment	PS2	2004-12-28	
Gran Turismo 5 Prologue	Polyphony Digital	Sony Computer Entertainment	PS3	2007-12-13	
Gran Turismo Concept	Polyphony Digital	Sony Computer Entertainment	PS2	2002-01-01	
Gran Turismo HD Concept	Polyphony Digital	Sony Computer Entertainment	PS3	2006-12-24	
Grand Prix 3	MicroProse	Hasbro Interactive	WIN	2000-06	
Grand Prix 4	MicroProse	Infogrames	WIN	2002-06-21	
Grand Prix Challenge	Infogrames Melbourne House	Infogrames	PS2	2002-11-22	
Grand Touring	ValuSoft	Elite Systems	WIN	2003-03-04	
GripShift	Sidhe	Ubisoft	PSP, PSN, X360	2005-09-12	
Grooverider: Slot Car Thunder	King of the Jungle	Encore, Inc.	PS2, XBOX, GCN	2003-09-26	
Group S Challenge	DigitalStudio	Capcom	XBOX	2003-08-28	
GT Advance 2: Rally Racing	MTO	THQ	GBA	2001-12-07	
GT Advance 3: Pro Concept Racing	MTO	THQ	GBA	2002-04-26	
GT Advance Championship Racing	MTO	THQ	GBA	2001-03-21	
GT Cube	MTO		GCN	2003-06-20	
GT Legends	SimBin Studios	10tacle Studios	WIN	2005-10-15	
GT Pro Series	MTO	Ubisoft	Wii	2006-11-19	
GT Racers	Aqua Pacific	Oxygen Interactive, Liquid Games	WIN, PS2, GBA	2004-11-05	
GT Racing: Motor Academy	Gameloft		iOS, DROID, SYM	2009	
GT-R 400	Kuju Entertainment	Midas Interactive Entertainment	WIN, PS2	2004-06-25	
GTI Club+: Rally Côte d'Azur	Sumo Digital	Konami	PS3	2008-12-04	
GTR – FIA GT Racing Game	SimBin Studios	10tacle Studios, Atari SA	WIN	2005-03-11	
GTR 2 – FIA GT Racing Game	Blimey! Games Ltd.	Atari SA	WIN	2006-09-29	
GTR Evolution	SimBin Studios	Viva Media	WIN	2008-09-01	
H-Craft Championship	Irrgheist	Manifesto Games	DROID, WIN, LIN	2007-05-24	
H2Overdrive	Specular Interactive	Raw Thrills	Arcade	2009	
Hannspree Ten Kate Honda: SBK-07 Superbike World Championship	Milestone	Valcon Games	PS2, PSP	2007-10-29	
Hard Truck 2: King of the Road	JoWooD Productions	JoWooD Productions, DreamCatcher Interactive	WIN	2002-06-07	
Hard Truck Apocalypse	Targem Games	Buka Entertainment	WIN	2005-12-08	
Hardware: Online Arena	London Studio	Sony Computer Entertainment	PS2	2003-11-7	
Harley-Davidson: Wheels of Freedom	Canopy Games	Infogrames	WIN	2000	
Hello Kitty: Roller Rescue	XPEC Entertainment	Namco	WIN, PS2, XBOX, GCN	2005-04-28	
Heracles Chariot Racing	Neko Entertainment	Midas Interactive	PS2, PSP, PSN, Wii	2007-07-06	
Herbie Rescue Rally	Climax Handheld Games		DS	2007	
High Voltage Hot Rod Show	High Voltage Software		Wii	2009-01-19	
Highway Pursuit	Adam Dawes/Retrospec		WIN	2003-11-12	
Hooters Road Trip	Hoplite Research	Ubi Soft	WIN, PS1	2002-03-25	
Hot Rod: American Street Drag	Canopy Games	ValuSoft	WIN	2003-08-31	
Hot Wheels Battle Force 5	Sidhe Interactive	Activision	Wii, DS	2009-11-10	
Hot Wheels Extreme Racing	Atod	THQ	PS1	2001-09-30	
Hot Wheels Micro Racers	Unique Development Studios	Mattel Interactive, THQ	WIN	2000-04-28	
Hot Wheels Velocity X	Beyond Games	THQ	WIN, PS2, GCN, GBA	2002-10-16	
Hot Wheels World Race	Climax Group, Destination Software	THQ	WIN, PS2, GCN, GBA	2003-10-29	
Hot Wheels: Beat That!	Eutechnyx, Human Soft	Activision	WIN, PS2, X360, Wii, DS	2007-07-02	
Hot Wheels: Burnin' Rubber	Altron	THQ	GBA	2001-11-21	
Hot Wheels: Stunt Track Challenge	Climax Racing, Destination Software	THQ	WIN, XBOX, PS2, GBA	2004-11-09	
Hugo: Bukkazoom!	ITE Media	Namco	PS2, WIN, GBA	2003-10-31	
Hummer (video game)	Sega	Sega, General Motors	Arcade	2009	
Hummer Badlands	Eutechnyx	Global Star Software	PS2, XBOX	2006-04-13	
Hyperball Racing	Gabitasoft Entertainment		WIN	2006-09-18	
IHRA Drag Racing 2004	Super Happy Fun Fun	Bethesda Softworks	XBOX	2003-12-25	
IHRA Drag Racing: Sportsman Edition	Bethesda Softworks		WIN, PS2, XBOX	2006-06-12	
IHRA Professional Drag Racing 2005	Bethesda Softworks		WIN, PS2, XBOX	2004-11-05	
Import Tuner Challenge	Genki	Ubisoft	X360	2006-07-27	
Indianapolis 500 Evolution	Brain in a Jar	Destineer	X360	2009-09-30	
Indianapolis 500 Legends	Torus Games	Destineer	Wii, DS	2007-12-18	
Indy Racing 2000	Paradigm Entertainment	Infogrames	N64	2000-06-09	
IndyCar Series	Codemasters		WIN, PS2, XBOX	2003-05-21	
IndyCar Series 2005	Codemasters		PS2, XBOX	2004-06-22	
Initial D Arcade Stage	Sega		Arcade, PS2, PSP, PS3	2001	
Initial D Arcade Stage 4	Sega		Arcade	2007-02-21	
Initial D Extreme Stage	Sega		PS3	2008-07-03	
1nsane	Invictus Games	Codemasters	WIN	2000-11	
iRacing.com	iRacing.com Motorsport Simulations		WIN, LIN, OSX	2008-08-26	
The Italian Job	Pixelogic	Rockstar Games, Sales Curve Interactive	WIN, PS1	2001-10-05	
The Italian Job	Climax Brighton	Eidos Interactive, Square Enix	PS2, XBOX, GCN	2003-06-24	
Jak X: Combat Racing	Naughty Dog	Sony Computer Entertainment	PS2	2005-10-18	
Jeep Thrills	Game Sauce	DSI Games	PS2, Wii	2008-08-05	
JellyCar	Walaber	Walaber, Microsoft	iOS, X360	2008-02-20	
JellyCar 2	Creature Feep	Disney Interactive Studios	iOS, PSP, Wii, DS	2009-11-07	
Jeremy McGrath Supercross 2000	Acclaim Studios Salt Lake City	Acclaim Sports	N64, PS1, DC, GBC	2000-02-29	
Jeremy McGrath Supercross World	Acclaim Studios Salt Lake City	Acclaim Max Sports	PS1, GCN	2001-11-15	
Jet X2O	Killer Game	Sony Computer Entertainment	PS2	2002-10-29	
Jugular Street Luge Racing	nFusion Interactive	HeadGames Publishing	WIN, PS2	2000	
Juiced	Juice Games	THQ	WIN, PS2, XBOX, MOBI	2005-06-13	
Juiced 2: Hot Import Nights	Juice Games, Paradigm Entertainment	THQ	WIN, PS2, PS3, X360, DS, PSP	2007-09-17	
Juiced: Eliminator	Juice Games	THQ	PSP, MOBI	2006-06-28	
Kaido Racer	Genki	Konami	PS2	2004-02-26	
Karnaaj Rally	Infinite Dreams Inc.	Jaleco	GBA, SYM	2003-01-02	
Kawasaki Jet Ski	Data Design Interactive	Bold Games	Wii	2008-01-22	
Kawasaki Quad Bikes	Data Design Interactive	Bold Games	Wii	2007-10-26	
Keroro Gunsō Taiketsu! Gekisō Keronprix Daisakusen de Arimasu!!	Sunrise Interactive		GBA	2004-12-09	
Kinetica	Santa Monica Studio	Sony Computer Entertainment America	PS2	2001-10-14	
King of Route 66, The	Sega	Sega AM2, Tose	Arcade, PS2	2002-02-03	
Kirby Air Ride	HAL Laboratory	Nintendo	GCN	2003-07-11	
Knight Rider: The Game	Davilex Games	Tri Synergy	WIN, PS2	2002-11-22	
Konami Krazy Racers	KCEK	Konami	GBA, WiiU	2001-03-21	
L.A. Rush	Midway Studios - Newcastle	Midway Games	WIN, PS2, XBOX, GZM, PSP	2005-10-10	
LA Street Racing	Invictus Games	Groove Media Inc.	WIN	2006-12-01	
Leadfoot	Ratbag Games	WizardWorks	WIN	2001-06-01	
Lego Racers 2	Attention to Detail	Lego Software	WIN, PS2, GBA	2001-09-27	
Lego Stunt Rally	Intelligent Games, Graphic State	Lego Media	WIN, GBC	2000-09-13	
LightBike	Pankaku		iOS, DROID	2009-01-29	
Live for Speed	Scawen Roberts, Eric Bailey and Victor van Vlaardingen		WIN	2003-07-13	
London Taxi: Rush Hour	Data Design Interactive	Bold Games	WIN, PS2, Wii	2006-06-23	
Looney Tunes Racing	Circus Freak Studios	Infogrames	PS1, GBC	2000-11-13	
Looney Tunes: Space Race	Infogrames Melbourne House	Infogrames	DC, PS2	2000-11-17	
Lotus Challenge	Kuju Entertainment	UTV Ignition Entertainment	WIN, PS2, XBOX, GCN, MOBI	2001-11-02	
M&M's Kart Racing	Frontline Studios	DSI Games, Zoo Digital Publishing	DS, Wii	2007-10-25	
Mad Dash Racing	Crystal Dynamics	Eidos Interactive	XBOX	2001-11-15	
Mad Rally	TMReality	Play Publishing	WIN	2006-05-04	
Mad Tracks	Load Inc.	Micro Application, D3 Publisher	WIN, X360	2006-02-27	
Madagascar Kartz	Sidhe Interactive, Virtuos	Activision	DS, PS3, Wii, X360	2009-10-23	
Mario Kart Arcade GP	Namco		Arcade	2005	
Mario Kart Arcade GP 2	Bandai Namco Games	Namco Bandai Games	Arcade	2007	
Mario Kart DS	Nintendo EAD	Nintendo	DS, WiiU	2005-11-14	
Mario Kart Wii	Nintendo EAD	Nintendo	Wii	2008-04-10	
Mario Kart: Double Dash	Nintendo EAD	Nintendo	GCN	2003-11-07	
Mario Kart: Super Circuit / Mario Kart Advance	Intelligent Systems	Nintendo	GBA, 3DS, WiiU, NX	2001-07-21	
Mart Racer	Joju Games		Wii	2009-09-14	
Mashed	Supersonic Software	Empire Interactive	WIN, PS2, XBOX	2004-06-18	
Maximum Chase	Genki	Majesco	XBOX	2002-09-36	
MegaRace 3	Cryo Interactive	DreamCatcher Interactive	WIN, PS2	2002-01-09	
Mercedes-Benz Truck Racing	Synetic GmbH	THQ	WIN	2000	
Mercedes-Benz World Racing	Synetic		WIN, PS2, XBOX, GCN	2003-09-30	
Metropolis Street Racer	Bizarre Creations	Sega	DC	2000-11-03	
Michael Schumacher Racing World Kart 2002	Radon Labs	JoWooD Productions	WIN, PS1	2002-09-18	
Michelin Rally Masters: Race of Champions	Digital Illusions CE	Infogrames	WIN, PS1	2000-07-25	
Mickey's Speedway USA	Rare	Nintendo	GBC, N64	2000-11-13	
Micro Machines V4	Supersonic Software	Codemasters	WIN, PS2, PSP, DS	2006-06-27	
Micro Maniacs	Codemasters		PS1, GBC	2000-10-05	
Midnight Club 3: DUB Edition	Rockstar San Diego, Rockstar Leeds	Rockstar Games	PS2, XBOX, PSP	2005-04-12	
Midnight Club II	Rockstar San Diego	Rockstar Games	WIN, PS2, XBOX	2003-04-09	
Midnight Club: Los Angeles	Rockstar San Diego, Rockstar London	Rockstar Games, Take-Two Interactive, Spike	PS3, X360, PSP	2008-10-20	
Midnight Club: Street Racing	Angel Studios, Rebellion Developments	Rockstar Games, Destination Software	PS2, GBA	2000-10-26	
Midtown Madness 2	Angel Studios	Microsoft	WIN	2000-09-22	
Midtown Madness 3	Digital Illusions	Microsoft Game Studios	XBOX	2003-06-17	
Mini Desktop Racing	Data Design Interactive	Conspiracy Entertainment	WIN, PS2, Wii	2005-07-20	
Mini Racing Online	Vicente Mas Morant	Codemasters	WIN	2003	
Monster 4x4: Masters of Metal	Ubisoft Barcelona, Inland Productions	Ubisoft	PS2, GCN	2003-11-25	
Monster 4x4: Stunt Racer	Ubisoft Reflections	Ubisoft	Wii	2009-10-27	
Monster 4x4: World Circuit	Ubisoft Barcelona	Ubisoft	XBOX, Wii	2006-03-23	
Monster Jam	Torus Games	Activision	WIN, PS2, Wii, X360, DS	2007-11-13	
Monster Jam: Maximum Destruction	Inland Productions	Ubisoft	WIN, PS2, GBA, GCN	2002-03-27	
Monster Jam: Urban Assault	Torus Games	Activision	PS2, PSP, Wii, DS	2008-10-28	
Monster Trucks Nitro	RedLynx	Miniclip	WIN, OSX, iOS	2008-12-19	
Monster Trux: Arenas	Data Design Interactive	Conspiracy Entertainment	Wii	2007-09-25	
Moscow Racer	IRS		WIN	2009-03	
Moto Racer 3	Delphine Software International	Infogrames	WIN	2001-12-07	
Moto Racer Advance	Adeline Software International, Delphine Software International	Ubi Soft	GBA	2002-10-04	
Moto Racer DS	Artefacts Studio	SouthPeak Games	DS	2008-10-28	
Moto Racer World Tour	Delphine Software International	Infogrames	PS1	2000-09-29	
Motocross Madness 2	Rainbow Studios	Microsoft Game Studios	WIN	2000-05-25	
Motocross Mania 3	Deibus Studios	2K Games	PS2, XBOX	2005-04-22	
MotoGP '06	Climax Racing	THQ	X360	2006-06-09	
MotoGP '07	Climax Racing	THQ	WIN, X360, MOBI	2007-08-24	
MotoGP '07 (PS2)	Milestone	Capcom	PS2	2007-10-01	
MotoGP '08	Milestone	Capcom	WIN, PS2, PS3, Wii, X360	2008-10-24	
MotoGP	Namco		PS2	2000-10-12	
MotoGP	Namco Bandai Games		PSP	2006-08-24	
MotoGP 3	Namco		PS2	2003-02-27	
MotoGP 3: Ultimate Racing Technology	Climax Racing	THQ	WIN, MOBI, XBOX	2005-05	
MotoGP 4	Namco		PS2	2005-05-27	
MotoGP: Ultimate Racing Technology	Climax Brighton	THQ	WIN, XBOX, GBA	2002-03-08	
Motor City Online	Electronic Arts		WIN	2001-10-29	
Motor Mayhem	Beyond Games	Infogrames	PS3	2001-7-2	
MotorStorm	Evolution Studios	Sony Computer Entertainment	PS3	2006-12-14	
MotorStorm: Arctic Edge	Bigbig Studios, Virtuos	Sony Computer Entertainment	PSP, PS2	2009-09-17	
MotorStorm: Pacific Rift	Evolution Studios	Sony Computer Entertainment	PS3	2008-10-28	
MTX Mototrax	Left Field Productions	Activision	WIN, PS2, XBOX, OSX, PSP	2004-03-02	
Muppet RaceMania	Traveller's Tales	Midway Games	PS1	2000-04-19	
MX Rider	Paradigm Entertainment	Infogrames	PS2	2001-10-26	
MX Superfly	Pacific Coast Power & Light	THQ	PS2, XBOX, GCN	2002-06-17	
MX Unleashed	Rainbow Studios	THQ	PS2, XBOX	2004-02-17	
MX vs. ATV Reflex	THQ Digital Phoenix, Tantalus Studios	THQ	WIN, PS3, PSP, X360, DS	2009-12-01	
MX vs. ATV Unleashed	Rainbow Studios	THQ	WIN, PS2, XBOX	2005-03-16	
MX vs. ATV: Untamed	Rainbow Studios, Incinerator Studios, Tantalus Media	THQ	DS, PS2, PS3, PSP, X360, Wii	2007-12-17	
MySims Racing	Artificial Mind and Movement	Electronic Arts	Wii, DS	2009-06-08	
N.I.C.E.2	Synetic GmbH	SouthPeak Interactive	WIN	2000	
NASCAR 06: Total Team Control	EA Tiburon	EA Sports	PS2, XBOX	2005-08-30	
NASCAR 07	EA Tiburon	EA Sports	PS2, PSP, XBOX	2006-09-06	
NASCAR 08	EA Tiburon	EA Sports	PS2, PS3, X360	2007-07-23	
NASCAR 2000	EA Sports, Stormfront Studios, Software Creations	EA Sports, THQ	WIN, N64, GBC, PS1	2000	
NASCAR 2001	EA Sports		PS1, PS2	2000	
NASCAR 2005: Chase for the Cup	EA Tiburon	EA Sports	PS2, XBOX, GCN	2004-08-31	
NASCAR Arcade	Sega AM-3	Sega	Arcade	2000	
NASCAR Heat	Monster Games	Hasbro Interactive	WIN, PS1, GBC	2000-09-27	
NASCAR Heat 2002	Monster Games	Infogrames	PS2, XBOX, GBA	2001-11-14	
NASCAR Kart Racing	Electronic Arts	EA Sports	Wii	2009-02-10	
NASCAR Racers	Majesco		GBC	2000	
NASCAR Racing 2002 Season	Papyrus Design Group	Sierra Entertainment	WIN, MAC	2002-02-14	
NASCAR Racing 2003 Season	Papyrus Design Group	Sierra Entertainment	WIN, MAC	2003-02-13	
NASCAR Racing 4	Papyrus Design Group	Sierra Entertainment	WIN	2001-02-06	
NASCAR Rumble	EA Redwood Shores	Electronic Arts	PS1	2000-01-31	
NASCAR SimRacing	EA Tiburon	EA Sports	WIN	2005-02-15	
NASCAR Thunder 2002	EA Tiburon	Electronic Arts	PS1, PS2, XBOX	2001-10-02	
NASCAR Thunder 2003	EA Sports, Budcat Creations, ISI	Electronic Arts	WIN, PS1, PS2, XBOX, GCN	2002-09-19	
NASCAR Thunder 2004	ISI, EA Tiburon, Budcat Creations	EA Sports	WIN, PS1, PS2, XBOX	2003-09-16	
NASCAR: Dirt to Daytona	Monster Games	Infogrames	PS2, GCN	2002-11-11	
Need for Speed: Carbon	EA Canada, EA Black Box, Rovio Mobile	Electronic Arts	WIN, PS2, PS3, X360, Wii, XBOX, GCN, GBA, DS, PSP, MOBI, OSX, ZB, Arcade	2006-10-31	
Need for Speed: Hot Pursuit 2	EA Black Box, EA Seattle	Electronic Arts	WIN, PS2, XBOX, GCN	2002-09-30	
Need for Speed: Most Wanted	EA Black Box, EA Redwood Shores	Electronic Arts	WIN, PS2, XBOX, X360, GCN, GBA, DS, PSP	2005-11-11	
Need for Speed: Nitro	Firebrand Games, EA Montreal	Electronic Arts	DS, Wii	2009-11-03	
Need for Speed: Porsche Unleashed	Eden Studios, EA Canada, Pocketeers	Electronic Arts, Destination Software, ZOO Digital Publishing	WIN, PS1, GBA	2000-02-29	
Need for Speed: ProStreet	EA Black Box, Exient Entertainment	Electronic Arts, EA Mobile	WIN, PS2, PS3, Wii, DS, X360, MOBI, PSP	2007-11-14	
Need for Speed: Shift	Slightly Mad Studios, EA Bright Light	Electronic Arts	WIN, PS3, X360, PSP, iOS, DROID, SYM, MEEGO	2009-09-15	
Need for Speed: Undercover	EA Black Box, Exient Entertainment, Firebrand Games	Electronic Arts	WIN, DS, PS2, PS3, PSP, Wii, X360, BB10, iOS, SYM, webOS, WP	2008-11-18	
Need for Speed: Underground	EA Black Box	EA Games	WIN, PS2, XBOX, GCN, GBA	2003-11-17	
Need for Speed: Underground 2	EA Canada, Pocketeers	Electronic Arts	WIN, PS2, XBOX, GCN, GBA, DS, PSP	2004-11-09	
Need for Speed: Underground Rivals	Team Fusion	EA Games	PSP	2005-02-24	
NetKar Pro	Kunos Simulazioni		WIN	2006-04-10	
New York Race	Kalisto Entertainment	Wanadoo Edition	WIN, PS2, GBC	2001-11-17	
NGEN Racing	Curly Monsters	Infogrames	PS1	2000	
Nicktoons Nitro	Raw Thrills		Arcade	2009-11-10	
Nicktoons Racing	Software Creations	Hasbro Interactive, Infogrames	Arcade, WIN, PS1, GBC, GBA	2000	
Nicktoons Winners Cup Racing	Pronto Games	ValuSoft, THQ	WIN	2006-02-15	
Nitro Stunt Racing	GameSeed		WIN	2007-12-28	
Nitrobike	Left Field Productions	Ubisoft	PS2, Wii	2008-01-15	
Novadrome	Stainless Games	Buena Vista Games	X360	2006-12-20	
Open Kart	Microïds		WIN	2001-09-24	
Option Tuning Car Battle Spec R	MTO	MTO	PS1	2000-05-11	
OutRun 2	Sega AM2, Sumo Digital	Sega, Microsoft Game Studios	Arcade, XBOX	2003-12-13	
OutRun 2006: Coast 2 Coast	Sumo Digital	Sega	WIN, PS2, XBOX, PSP	2006-03-17	
OutRun Online Arcade	Sumo Digital	Sega	PS3, X360	2009	
Pac-Man World Rally	Smart Bomb Interactive	Bandai Namco Games	WIN, PS2, PSP, GCN	2006-08-22	
Paris-Dakar Rally	Broadsword Interactive	Acclaim Entertainment	WIN, PS2	2001-10-09	
Pimp My Ride	Eutechnyx	Activision	PS2, X360, PSP, Wii	2006-11-21	
PixelJunk Racers	Q-Games	Sony Computer Entertainment	PS3	2007-09-13	
Planet Hot Wheels	Mattel, Hot Wheels	Mattel	WIN, MAC	2001	
PocketBike Racer	Blitz Games	King Games	XBOX, X360	2006-11-19	
POD 2	Ubisoft		DC	2000	
Pokémon Dash	Ambrella	Nintendo, The Pokémon Company	DS	2004-12-02	
Polaris SnoCross	Vicarious Visions	Vatical Entertainment	N64, PS1, GBC, WIN	2000-02	
Pop Island	ODENIS Studio		DS	2009-12-07	
Pro Cycling Manager Pro 05-06	Cyanide	Focus Home Interactive	WIN	2005-06-22	
Pro Cycling Manager Season 2006	Cyanide	Focus Home Interactive	WIN	2006-06-16	
Pro Cycling Manager Season 2007: Le Tour de France	Cyanide	Focus Home Interactive	WIN	2007-06	
Pro Cycling Manager Season 2008: Le Tour de France	Cyanide	Focus Home Interactive	WIN	2008-06	
Pro Cycling Manager Season 2009: Le Tour de France	Cyanide	Focus Home Interactive	WIN	2009-06-18	
Pro Rally 2001	Ubi Soft Barcelona	Ubi Soft	WIN	2000-12-04	
Pro Rally 2002	Ubi Soft Barcelona	Ubi Soft	PS2, GCN	2002-03-28	
Project Gotham Racing	Bizarre Creations	Microsoft	XBOX	2001-11-15	
Project Gotham Racing 2	Bizarre Creations	Microsoft Game Studios	XBOX	2003-11-17	
Project Gotham Racing 3	Bizarre Creations	Microsoft Game Studios	X360	2005-11-22	
Project Gotham Racing 4	Bizarre Creations	Microsoft Game Studios	X360	2007-10-02	
Project Gotham Racing Mobile	Glu Mobile		MOBI	2007-02-14	
Project Torque	Invictus Games	Aeria Games	WIN	2008-04-30	
Pulse Racer	Jaleco		XBOX	2003-01-02	
Pure	Black Rock Studio	Disney Interactive Studios	WIN, PS3, X360	2008-09-16	
Pursuit Force	Bigbig Studios	Sony Computer Entertainment	PSP	2005-11-18	
Pursuit Force: Extreme Justice	Bigbig Studios	SCEE, SCEA	PSP	2007-12-07	
Pyroblazer	Eipix Entertainment	Candella Software	WIN	2008-11-13	
Quantum Redshift	Curly Monsters	Microsoft Game Studios	XBOX	2002-09-17	
R-Tuned : Ultimate Street Racing	Sega AM2	Sega	Arcade	2008-10-23	
R: Racing Evolution	Namco		PS2, XBOX, GCN	2003-11-27	
Race - The Official WTCC Game	SimBin Studios	Eidos Interactive	WIN	2006-11-24	
Race 07	SimBin Studios		WIN	2007-10-12	
Race Driver 2006	Sumo Digital	Codemasters	PSP	2006-06-06	
Race Driver: Create & Race	Firebrand Games	Codemasters	DS	2007-09-28	
Race Driver: Grid	Codemasters, Feral Interactive	Codemasters, Sega, Feral Interactive	WIN, PS3, X360, Arcade, OSX	2008-05-30	
Race On	SimBin	bitComposer Games	WIN	2009-10-16	
Race or Die	The Godfather	Codemasters, Spike	iOS	2009-10-05	
Race Pro	SimBin	Atari SA	X360	2009-02-17	
Racing Battle: C1 Grand Prix	Genki	Genki	PS2	2005-05-26	
Racing Gears Advance	Orbital Media		GBA	2004-12-17	
RalliSport Challenge	Digital Illusions	Microsoft Game Studios	XBOX, WIN	2002-03-04	
RalliSport Challenge 2	Digital Illusions	Microsoft Game Studios	XBOX	2004-05-04	
Rally Championship	Warthog Games	Conspiracy Entertainment	PS2, GCN	2002-05-31	
Rally Championship Xtreme	Warthog Games	SCi Games	WIN	2001-11-01	
Rally Fusion: Race of Champions	Climax Brighton	Activision	PS2, XBOX, GCN	2002-11-11	
Rally Trophy	Bugbear Entertainment	JoWooD Productions	WIN	2001-11-20	
RARS				2000	
Rayman Rush	Ubi Soft Shanghai	Ubi Soft	PS1	2002-03-08	
RC de Go!	Taito	Acclaim Entertainment	PS1	2000	
RC Revenge	Acclaim Studios Cheltenham	Acclaim Entertainment	PS1	2000-08-16	
RC Revenge Pro	Acclaim Studios Cheltenham	Acclaim Entertainment	PS2	2000-12-01	
Real Racing	Firemint		iOS	2009-06-08	
Rebel Trucker	3 Romans	Global Star Software	WIN	2003-11-25	
Redline	Ambrosia Software		OSX	2006-09-21	
rFactor	Image Space Incorporated		WIN	2005-08-31	
Richard Burns Rally	Warthog Games	SCi	WIN, PS2, XBOX, GZM	2004-07-09	
Ridge Racer (PSP) (2004)	Namco		PSP	2004-12-12	
Ridge Racer 2 (PSP) (2006)	Namco Bandai Games		PSP	2006-09-14	
Ridge Racer 6	Namco		X360	2005-11-22	
Ridge Racer 64	Nintendo Software Technology	Nintendo	N64	2000-02-14	
Ridge Racer DS	Nintendo Software Technology	Namco	DS	2004-12-07	
Ridge Racer 7	Namco Bandai Games		PS3	2006-11-11	
Ridge Racer Accelerated	Namco Networks		iOS	2009-12-15	
Ridge Racer V	Namco		PS2, Arcade	2000-03-04	
Riding Spirits	Spike	BAM! Entertainment	PS2	2002-07-25	
Rig 'n' Roll	SoftLab-NSK	THQ	WIN	2009-11-27	
Rigs of Rods	Rigs of Rods Contributors		LIN, OSX, WIN	2005-08-11	
Road Rash: Jailbreak	EA Redwood Shores	Electronic Arts	PS1, GBA	2000-02-01	
Road Trip Adventure	E-game	Conspiracy Entertainment	PS2, PS3	2002-01-10	
Road Trip: The Arcade Edition	Hudson Soft	Takara, Conspiracy Entertainment, Zoo Digital Publishing	GCN	2002-12-19	
RoadKill	Terminal Reality	Midway Games	PS2, XBOX, GCN	2003-10-13	
Rollcage Stage II	Attention to Detail	Midway Games, Psygnosis, Take-Two Interactive	WIN, PS1	2000-03-08	
RPM Tuning	Babylon Software	Wanadoo Edition	WIN, PS2, XBOX	2004-11-19	
RS3: Racing Simulation 3	Ubi Soft Paris	Ubi Soft	WIN, PS2	2003-10-30	
Rumble Racing	EA Redwood Shores	Electronic Arts	PS2	2001-04-23	
Runabout 2	Climax Entertainment	Media Rings	PS1	2000-05-19	
Rush Rush Rally Racing	Senile Team	RedSpotGames	DC, Wii	2009-10-04	
SBK-07: Superbike World Championship	Milestone	Valcon Games	PS2, PSP	2007-05-18	
SBK-08: Superbike World Championship	Black Bean Games	Milestone	WIN, PS2, PS3, PSP, X360	2008-08-01	
SBK-09: Superbike World Championship	Milestone	Black Bean Games	WIN, PS2, PS3, PSP, X360	2009-05-29	
SCORE International Baja 1000	Left Field Productions	Activision	WIN, PS2, PS3, X360, Wii	2008-10-28	
Screamer 4x4	Clever's Development	Titus Software, Virgin Interactive	WIN	2000-12-22	
Sea-Doo Hydrocross	Vicarious Visions, Engine Software	Vatical Entertainment	PS1	2001-06-06	
Sega Driving Simulator	Sega		Arcade	2002	
Sega GT	Wow Entertainment/Tose	Sega	WIN, DC	2000-02-17	
Sega GT 2002	Wow Entertainment	Sega	XBOX	2002-09-02	
Sega GT Online	Wow Entertainment	Sega	XBOX	2003-12-25	
Sega Race TV	Sega AM Plus	Sega	Arcade	2008-02-19	
Sega Rally 2006	Sega		PS2	2006-01-12	
Sega Rally 3	Sega Racing Studio	Sega	Arcade, X360, PSN	2008-06-30	
Sega Rally Revo	Sega Racing Studio	Sega	WIN, PS3, X360, PSP	2007-09-27	
Shox	Electronic Arts (Chertsey)	Electronic Arts	PS2	2002-09-23	
Shrek Smash n' Crash Racing	Torus Games	Activision	PS2, GCN, GBA, DS, PSP	2006-11-14	
Simpsons: Road Rage, The	Radical Entertainment	Electronic Arts, Fox Interactive	PS2, XBOX, GCN, GBA	2001-11-24	
Ski-Doo: Snowmobile Challenge	ColdWood Interactive	Valcon Games	PS3, Wii, X360	2009-03-10	
Sled Storm (2002)	EA Canada	EA Sports BIG	PS2	2002-03-11	
Smash Cars	Creat Studios	Metro3D, Inc.	WIN, PS2, PSN, Steam	2003-08-13	
Smashing Drive	Gaelco		Arcade, XBOX, GCN, GBA	2000-12-10	
Smuggler's Run	Angel Studios	Rockstar Games	PS2, GBA	2000-10-26	
Smuggler's Run 2	Angel Studios	Rockstar Games	PS2, GCN	2001-10-30	
Smuggler's Run: Warzones	Angel Studios	Rockstar Games	GCN	2002-08-07	
Smurf Racer!	Artificial Mind and Movement	Infogrames	PS1	2001-04-01	
Snail Mail	Sandlot Games		WIN, Wii, OSX, iOS, DROID	2004-12-03	
Sno-Cross Championship Racing	Unique Development Studios	Crave Entertainment	PS1, DC	2000	
Sonic Riders	Sonic Team, Now Production, United Game Artists	Sega	WIN, PS2, XBOX, GCN	2006-02-21	
Sonic Riders: Zero Gravity	Sonic Team, Now Production, United Game Artists	Sega	PS2, Wii	2008-01-08	
Sonic Rivals	Backbone Entertainment	Sega Studio USA, Sega	PSP	2006-11-16	
Sonic Rivals 2	Backbone Entertainment	Sega Studio USA, Sega	PSP	2007-11-13	
Speed Challenge: Jacques Villeneuve's Racing Vision	Ubisoft		WIN, PS2, GCN	2002-10-03	
Speed Kings	Climax London	Acclaim Entertainment	PS2, XBOX, GCN	2003-05-23	
Speed Racer: The Videogame	Sidhe Interactive, Virtuos	Warner Bros. Interactive Entertainment	Wii, DS, PS2	2008-05-06	
Spirit of Speed 1937	Broadsword Interactive	Hasbro Interactive, LJN	WIN, DC	2000-06-09	
Splashdown	Rainbow Studios	Infogrames	PS2, XBOX	2001-11-05	
Splashdown: Rides Gone Wild	Rainbow Studios	THQ	PS2, MOBI	2003-08-05	
SPOGS Racing	Pronto Games	D2CspoG	Wii	2008-07-07	
SpyHunter: Nowhere to Run	Terminal Reality	Midway Games	WIN, PS2, XBOX	2006-09-05	
SSX 3	EA Canada	EA Sports Big	PS2, XBOX, GCN, GBA, GZM	2003-10-20	
Star Wars Racer Revenge	Rainbow Studios	LucasArts	PS2	2002-02-11	
Star Wars: Racer Arcade	Sega AM3	LucasArts, Sega	Arcade	2000	
Star Wars: Super Bombad Racing	Lucas Learning	LucasArts	PS2	2001-04-23	
Starsky & Hutch	Mind's Eye Productions	Empire Interactive, Gotham Games	WIN, PS2, XBOX, GBA, GCN	2003-06-20	
STCC - The Game	SimBin Studios	Atari SA	WIN	2008	
Street Legal	Invictus Games	Activision Value	WIN	2002	
Street Legal Racing: Redline	Invictus Games	Activision Value	WIN	2003-07-18	
Street Racing Syndicate	Eutechnyx	Namco	WIN, PS2, XBOX, GCN, GBA	2004-08-17	
Street Riders	Ubisoft, Virtuos	Ubisoft	PSP	2006-03-31	
Street Supremacy	Genki	Genki, Konami	PSP	2005	
Street Trace NYC	Gaia Industries	Microsoft	X360	2007	
Stunt GP	Team17	Titus Interactive	WIN, DC, PS2	2001-04-06	
Stunt Racer 64	Boss Game Studios	Midway Games	N64	2000-10-01	
Stuntman	Reflections Interactive	Infogrames	PS2, GBA	2002-06-23	
Stuntman: Ignition	Paradigm Entertainment	THQ	PS2, PS3, X360	2007-09-17	
Super PickUps	Milestone	XS Games	PS2, Wii	2007-09-26	
Super Trucks Racing	Jester Interactive	XS Games	PS2	2002-07-28	
Superbike 2001	Milestone	Electronic Arts	WIN	2000-10-06	
SuperCar Challenge	Eutechnyx	System 3	PS3	2009-09-04	
Supercar Street Challenge	Exakt	Activision	PS2, WIN	2001-10-22	
Superleague Formula 2009: The Game	Image Space Incorporated		WIN	2009-10-31	
Supersonic Acrobatic Rocket-Powered Battle-Cars	Psyonix		PS3	2008-10-09	
Superstars V8 Racing	Milestone	Black Bean Games, Codemasters	Arcade, WIN, PS3, X360	2009-06-26	
SuperTuxKart	Joerg Henrichs, Marianne Gagnon		WIN, OSX, LIN, AMI, AmiOS	2006-09-22	
Suzuki TT Superbikes	Jester Interactive	Jester Interactive, Valcon Games	PS2	2005-04-29	
Swamp Buggy Racing	Daylight Productions	WizardWorks	WIN	2000-01	
Swypeout	Spin Master		WIN	2007	
SX Superstar	Climax Solent	AKA Acclaim	PS2, XBOX, GCN	2003-06-26	
System Rush	Ideaworks Game Studio	Nokia	NGE	2005-09	
TalesRunner	RHAON	OGPlanet	WIN	2005	
TD Overdrive: The Brotherhood of Speed	Pitbull Syndicate	Infogrames	WIN, PS2, XBOX	2002-05-27	
Amsterdam Street Racer	Team6 Game Studios	Grabit	WIN	2006	
Amsterdam Taxi Madness	Team6 Game Studios	Davilex Games	WIN	2004-09	
ATV Mudracer	Team6 Game Studios	Media-Service 2000	WIN	2004	
City Racer: Underground Action	Team6 Game Studios	media Verlagsgesellschaft	WIN	2008-05	
Downtown Challenge	Team6 Game Studios	FIP Publishing	WIN	2008	
ESR: European Street Racing	Team6 Game Studios	XIDER	WIN	2007	
F-1 Chequered Flag	Team6 Game Studios	MarkSoft	WIN	2007	
FSR: French Street Racing	Team6 Game Studios	City Interactive	WIN	2008-05-27	
Glacier	Team6 Game Studios	Orca Multimedia	WIN	2006	
Glacier 2	Team6 Game Studios	Zoo Games	Wii	2009-10-27	
GSR: German Street Racing	Team6 Game Studios	Beat Games	WIN	2006	
Paris Chase	Team6 Game Studios		WIN	2007	
Scooter War3z	Team6 Game Studios	IQ Publishing	WIN	2006	
Shangai Street Racer	Team6 Game Studios	magnussoft Deutschland	WIN	2004-05-01	
Taxi 3: Extreme Rush	Team6 Game Studios	Fusion Software	WIN	2005-10-07	
Taxi Racer: London 2	Team6 Game Studios	Media-Service 2000	WIN	2003	
Taxi Racer: New York 2	Team6 Game Studios	magnussoft Deutschland	WIN	2004-06-04	
Taxi Raser	Team6 Game Studios	Davilex Games	WIN	2004-10-01	
Ultimate Motocross	Team6 Game Studios	FIP Publishing	WIN	2007-03-19	
Test Drive Cycles	Xantera	Infogrames	GBC	2000-07-26	
Test Drive Unlimited	Eden Games, Atari Melbourne House	Atari SA	WIN, PS2, X360, PSP	2006-09-05	
Test Drive: Eve of Destruction	Monster Games	Atari SA	PS2, XBOX	2004-08-25	
Test Drive: Off-Road Wide Open	Angel Studios	Infogrames	PS2, XBOX	2001-08-24	
Thrill Drive 2	Konami		Arcade	2003	
Thrill Drive 3	Konami	Polygon Magic	Arcade	2005	
TOCA Race Driver	Codemasters		WIN, PS2, XBOX	2002-09-23	
TOCA Race Driver 2	Codemasters		WIN, PS2, XBOX, MOBI, PSP	2004-04-13	
TOCA Race Driver 3	Codemasters		WIN, PS2, XBOX, PSP, OSX, DS	2006-02-22	
TOCA World Touring Cars	Codemasters		PS1, GBA	2000-09-25	
Tokyo Xtreme Racer 2	Genki	Crave Entertainment	DC	2000-06-22	
Tokyo Xtreme Racer 3	Genki	Crave Entertainment	PS2	2003-07-24	
Tokyo Xtreme Racer: Drift	Genki	Crave Entertainment	PS2	2003-02-27	
Tokyo Xtreme Racer: Drift 2	Genki	Crave Entertainment	PS2	2005-07-28	
Tokyo Xtreme Racer: Zero	Genki	Crave Entertainment	PS2	2001-03-15	
Tony Hawk's Downhill Jam	Toys for Bob	Activision	Wii, PS2, DS, GBA	2006-10-24	
Top Gear GT Championship	Kemco		GBA	2001-03-21	
Top Gear Hyper Bike	Snowblind Studios	Kemco	N64	2000-03-17	
Top Gear Pocket 2	Vision Works	Kemco	GBC	2000-01-30	
Top Gear Rally (2003)	Tantalus Interactive	Nintendo, Kemco	GBA	2003-07-25	
Top Gear: Dare Devil	Papaya Studio	Kemco	PS2	2000-12-19	
Total Immersion Racing	Razorworks	Empire Interactive, Feral Interactive	WIN, MAC, PS2, XBOX	2002-11-01	
Totaled!	Rage Software	Majesco	PS2, XBOX	2002-06-07	
Tour de France (2005)	Living Mobile	In-Fusio	MOBI	2005	
Tourist Trophy	Polyphony Digital	Sony Computer Entertainment	PS2	2006-02-02	
Toy Home	Game Republic	Sony Computer Entertainment	PS3	2007-12-20	
Toy Racer	No cliche	Sega	DC	2000-12-22	
Toy Story Racer	Traveller's Tales	Activision	GBC, PS1	2001-02-28	
TrackMania	Nadeo	Digital Jesters, Focus Home Interactive, Enlight Software, Buka Entertainment	WIN	2003-11-28	
TrackMania DS	Firebrand Games, Altus	Focus Home Interactive, Altus	DS	2008-11-18	
TrackMania Nations Forever	Nadeo	Focus Home Interactive	WIN	2008-04-16	
TrackMania Nations ESWC	Nadeo	Deep Silver	WIN	2006	
TrackMania Original	Nadeo	Focus Home Interactive	WIN	2005-10-21	
TrackMania Sunrise	Nadeo	Focus Home Interactive, Digital Jesters, Enlight Software	WIN	2005-04	
TrackMania United	Nadeo	Deep Silver, Buka Entertainment, Enlight Software, QV Software, Valve Corporation	WIN	2006-11-17	
Transworld Snowboarding	Housemarque	Infogrames	XBOX	2002-10-15	
Trials	RedLynx	Ubisoft	WEB	2000	
Trials 2: Second Edition	RedLynx		WIN	2008-03-01	
Trials HD	RedLynx, Ubisoft Kyiv	Microsoft Game Studios	X360	2009-08-12	
Truck Simulator	SCS Software		WIN, OSX, LIN	2008-08-06	
Tube Slider	NDcube	NEC Interchannel	GCN	2003-04-17	
Turismo Carretera	2Pez Games	777 Studios	WIN	2009-02-08	
Tux Racer	Sunspire Studios		LIN, MAC, WIN	2000-10-02	
Twisted Metal: Black	Incog Inc. Entertainment	Sony Computer Entertainment	PS2	2001-6-18	
Twisted Metal: Head-On	Incognito Entertainment	Sony Computer Entertainment	PSP, PS2	2005-3-24	
Tyco R/C: Assault with a Battery	Lucky Chicken Games	Mattel Interactive	PS1	2000-09	
Urban Jungle	Urban Development	Autoklub Rijeka	WIN	2005-12-06	
V-Rally 3	Velez & Dubail, Eden Games	Atari SA	WIN, GBA, PS2, XBOX, GCN	2002-06-21	
Vanishing Point	Clockwork Games	Acclaim Entertainment	DC, PS1	2001-01-04	
VDrift	Joe Venzon	Texas Instruments	LIN, BSD, OSX, WIN	2005-03-29	
Vigilante 8 Arcade	Isopod Labs	Activision	X360	2008-11-5	
Virtual Skipper 5: 32nd America's Cup: The Game	Nadeo	Focus	WIN	2007	
Wacky Races	Appaloosa Interactive	Infogrames	WIN, PS1, GBC	2000-06-30	
Wacky Races: Crash and Dash	Square Enix Europe	Eidos Interactive	DS, Wii	2008-06-17	
Wacky Races: Mad Motors	Coyote Console, Banpresto	Blast! Entertainment	PS2	2007-06-21	
Wacky Races: Starring Dastardly and Muttley	Infogrames Sheffield House	Infogrames	DC, PS2	2000-06-26	
Walt Disney World Quest: Magical Racing Tour	Crystal Dynamics	Eidos Interactive	WIN, PS1, GBC, DC	2000-03-23	
Wangan Midnight	Genki		PS3	2007-07-05	
Wangan Midnight Maximum Tune	Namco	Polygon Magic	Arcade	2003-07-04	
Wangan Midnight Maximum Tune 2	Namco	Polygon Magic	Arcade	2004-04-05	
Wangan Midnight Maximum Tune 3	Namco		Arcade	2007-07-01	
Wangan Midnight Maximum Tune 3 DX	Namco		Arcade	2008-12-16	
Wangan Midnight Maximum Tune 3 DX Plus	Namco		Arcade	2008-12-16	
Warm Up!	Lankhor	Microids	WIN, PS1	2000-11-16	
Wasteland Racers 2071	Triotech		Arcade	2006-11-20	
WaterRace	French Touch, SàRL		MAC	2000-12-23	
Wave Race: Blue Storm	Nintendo Software Technology	Nintendo	GCN	2001-09-14	
Wave Rally	Opus Studio Inc.	Eidos Interactive	PS2	2001-11-26	
Wheelspin	Awesome Play	Detn8 Games	Wii	2009-08-18	
Wild Wild Racing	Rage Software	Interplay Entertainment	PS2	2000-09-14	
Williams F1 Team Driver	KnowWonder	THQ	WIN	2001	
Wipeout Fusion	Psygnosis	BAM! Entertainment	PS2	2002-02-08	
Wipeout HD	Psygnosis	Sony Computer Entertainment	PS3	2008-09-25	
Wipeout Pulse	Psygnosis	Sony Computer Entertainment	PSP, PS2	2007-12-13	
Wipeout Pure	Psygnosis	Sony Computer Entertainment	PSP	2005-03-24	
Woody Woodpecker Racing	Syrox Developments	Konami	WIN, PS1, GBC	2000-12-15	
World of Outlaws: Sprint Cars 2002	Ratbag Games	Infogrames	WIN, PS2	2002-03-26	
World Racing 2	Synetic GmbH	TDK	WIN, PS2, XBOX	2005	
World Rally Championship	Evolution Studios	Sony Computer Entertainment, BAM! Entertainment	PS2	2001-11-30	
WRC 3	Evolution Studios	Sony Computer Entertainment	PS2	2003-11-21	
WRC 4	Evolution Studios	Sony Computer Entertainment	PS2	2004-10-22	
WRC II Extreme	Evolution Studios	Sony Computer Entertainment	PS2	2002-11-29	
WRC: FIA World Rally Championship Arcade	Unique Development Studios	Sony Computer Entertainment	PS1	2002-08-11	
WRC: Rally Evolved	Evolution Studios	Sony Computer Entertainment	PS2	2005-10-28	
Wreckless: The Yakuza Missions	Bunkasha	Activision	PS2, XBOX, GCN	2002-02-04	
WWE Crush Hour	Pacific Coast Power & Light	THQ	PS2, GCN	2003-03-17	
X-Moto	Nicolas Adenis-Lamarre	Independent	LIN, BSD, OSX, WIN	2005	
X-treme Express	Syscom Entertainment	Midas Interactive Entertainment	PS2	2001-02-21	
XGRA: Extreme-G Racing Association	Acclaim Studios Cheltenham	Acclaim Entertainment	PS2, XBOX, GCN	2003-09-11	
Xpand Rally	Techland	Deep Silver, Techland, TopWare Interactive, Micro Application	WIN	2004-09-24	
XS Airboat Racing	Miracle Designs	XS Games	PS1, PS3, PSP	2003	
Yamaha Supercross	Aurona Games, Coyote Console	NA: Destination Software; EU: Zoo Digital Publishing	WIN, PS2, Wii, DS	2008-11-25	
Yaris	Castaway Entertainment, Backbone Emeryville	Microsoft	X360	2007-10-10	
Zeebo Extreme	Tectoy	Tectoy, Zeebo	ZB	2009-08-15	
Zeebo Extreme Baja	Tectoy	Tectoy, Zeebo	ZB	2009-10-31	
Zeebo Extreme Corrida Aérea	Tectoy	Tectoy, Zeebo	ZB	2009-09-29	
Zeebo Extreme Rolimã (Ruleman)	Tectoy	Tectoy, Zeebo	ZB	2009-08-15	
Zombie Driver	Exor Studios		DROID, WIN, X360, PS3	2009-12-4	
Zusar Vasar	Real Vision, Inc.		DC	2000-07-27	

=== 2010s ===
Title	Developer	Publisher	Platforms	Release date	Ref.
2XL MX Offroad	2XL Games		iOS	2012-01-22	
2XL Racing	2XL Games		iOS	2014-10-15	
2XL TrophyLite Rally	2XL Games		iOS	2010-06-10	
3D Pixel Racing	Vidia	Microforum Games	Wii, iOS	2011-07-14	
Absolute Drift	Funselektor Labs		WIN, PS4, XOne, LIN, OSX, iOS, DROID	2015-07-29	
American Truck Simulator	SCS Software		WIN, OSX, LIN	2016-02-02	
Angry Birds Go!	Rovio Entertainment, Exient Entertainment	Rovio Entertainment	iOS, DROID, WP, BB10	2013-12-11	
Antigraviator	Cybernetic Walrus	Iceberg Interactive	WIN, PS4, XOne	2018-06-06	
Armageddon Riders	Targem Games		PS3	2011-06-02	
Asphalt 3D	Gameloft	Ubisoft	3DS	2011-03-10	
Asphalt 6: Adrenaline	Gameloft Barcelona	Gameloft	iOS, OSX, DROID, SYM, webOS, BB10, Bada	2010-12-21	
Asphalt 7: Heat	Gameloft Montreal	Gameloft	WIN, iOS, DROID, BB10, WP	2012-06-21	
Asphalt 8: Airborne	Gameloft Barcelona	Gameloft	WIN, iOS, DROID, WP, BB10, TIZ	2013-08-22	
Asphalt 9: Legends/Asphalt Legends Unite	Gameloft Barcelona	Gameloft	WIN, PS4, PS5, XOne, XSX/S, iOS, DROID, NX	2018-07-25	
Asphalt Nitro	Gameloft		DROID, TIZ	2015-05-12	
Asphalt Overdrive	Gameloft Madrid	Gameloft	WIN, iOS, DROID, WP	2014-09-24	
Asphalt Xtreme	Gameloft Madrid, Gameloft Barcelona	Gameloft	WIN, iOS, DROID	2016-10-27	
Asphalt: Injection	Gameloft	Ubisoft	PSV	2011-12-17	
Assetto Corsa	Kunos Simulazioni		WIN, PS4, XOne	2013-11-08	
Assetto Corsa Competizione	Kunos Simulazioni		WIN, PS4, PS5, XOne, XSX/S	2018-09-12	
Audiosurf 2	Dylan Fitterer		WIN, OSX, LIN	2015-05-26	
Auto Club Revolution	Eutechnyx		WIN	2013-04	
Bang Bang Racing	Playbox, Digital Reality	Digital Reality	DROID, WIN, PS3, PSN, X360	2011-05-13	
Batman	Specular Interactive	Raw Thrills	Arcade	2013	
Beach Buggy Blitz	Vector Unit		DROID, iOS, BB10	2012	
Beach Buggy Racing	Vector Unit		DROID, iOS, PS4, XOne, WP, NX	2014	
Beach City Drift	Cartoon Network Games		WIN	2016-07-22	
BeamNG.drive	BeamNG GmbH		WIN	2015-05-29	
Ben 10: Galactic Racing	Monkey Bar Games	D3 Publisher	PS3, X360, DS, Wii, 3DS, PSV	2011-10-18	
Blazerush	Targem Games		PS3, PS4, WIN, OSX, LIN	2014-10-29	
Blood Drive	Sidhe	Activision	PS3, X360	2010-11-2	
Blur	Bizarre Creations	Activision Blizzard	WIN, PS3, X360	2010-05-25	
Burnout Crash!	Criterion Games	Electronic Arts	PS3, X360, iOS	2011-09-20	
Bus Simulator 16	Stillalive Studios	Astragon	WIN, OSX	2016-03-03	
Bus Simulator 18	Stillalive Studios	Astragon	WIN, PS4, XOne	2018-06-13	
Calvin Tucker's Farm Animal Racing Tournament	Team6 Game Studios	Funbox Media	WIN, Wii	2010-07-13	
Car Town	Cie Games	Glu Mobile	SNG, iOS	2010-07-27	
Carmageddon: Max Damage	Stainless Games		WIN, OSX, PS4, XOne	2016-08-27	
Carmageddon: Reincarnation	Stainless Games		WIN, OSX	2014-03-27	
Cars 2	Avalanche Software, Firebrand Games, Virtual Toys	Disney Interactive Studios, Sony Computer Entertainment	WIN, OSX, DS, 3DS, PS3, PSP, Wii, iOS, X360	2011-06-21	
Cars 3: Driven to Win	Avalanche Software	Warner Bros. Interactive Entertainment	PS3, PS4, X360, XOne, WiiU, NX	2017-06-13	
Cars: Fast as Lightning	Gameloft	The Walt Disney Company, Pixar	DROID, iOS	2014-10-09	
Champion Jockey: G1 Jockey & Gallop Racer	Koei	Tecmo Koei	PS3, Wii, X360	2011-09-22	
Crash Bandicoot Nitro Kart 2	Polarbit	Activision	iOS	2010-05-27	
Crash Team Racing Nitro-Fueled	Beenox	Activision	WIN, PS4, XOne, NX	2019-06-21	
Crazy Cars: Hit the Road	Little World Entertainment	Anuman	WIN, iOS, DROID	2012	
Crew 2, The	Ivory Tower	Ubisoft	WIN, PS4, XOne	2018-06-29	
Crew, The	Ivory Tower, Ubisoft Reflections	Ubisoft	WIN, PS4, X360, XOne	2014-12-02	
Cruis'n Blast	Raw Thrills	Nintendo	Arcade	2017-01	
CSR Classics	Boss Alien, Mad Atom Games	NaturalMotion	iOS, DROID	2013-10-17	
CSR Racing	Boss Alien	NaturalMotion, Zynga	WIN, iOS, OSX, DROID	2012-06-28	
CSR Racing 2	Boss Alien	NaturalMotion	iOS, DROID	2015-12-07	
Dakar 18	Bigmoon Entertainment	Deep Silver	WIN, PS4, XOne	2018-09-25	
Danger Zone	Three Fields Entertainment		WIN, PS4, XOne	2017-05-30	
Danger Zone 2	Three Fields Entertainment		WIN, PS4, XOne	2018-06-07	
Dangerous Driving	Three Fields Entertainment		WIN, PS4, XOne	2019-04-09	
Descenders	RageSquid	No More Robots	WIN, XOne	2019-05-07	
Dirt 3	Codemasters Southam	Codemasters	WIN, PS3, X360	2011-05-24	
Dirt 4	Codemasters Southam	Codemasters	WIN, PS4, XOne	2017-06-09	
Dirt Rally	Codemasters		WIN, PS4, XOne, LIN	2015-12-07	
Dirt Rally 2.0	Codemasters		WIN, PS4, XOne	2019-02-26	
Dirt: Showdown	Codemasters Southam	Codemasters	WIN, PS3, X360	2012-05-25	
Dirty Drivin'	Specular Interactive	Raw Thrills	Arcade	2011	
Disc Drivin'	Pixelocity Software		iOS	2010-12-13	
DrawRace 2	RedLynx	Chillingo	iOS	2011-09-01	
Driveclub	Evolution Studios	Sony Computer Entertainment	PS4	2014-10-07	
Driver: Renegade 3D	Velez & Dubail	Ubisoft	3DS	2011-09-01	
Driver: San Francisco	Ubisoft Reflections	Ubisoft	WIN, PS3, Wii, X360, OSX	2011-09-01	
Ducati: 90th Anniversary	Milestone		WIN, PS4, XOne	2016-06-09	
Dust Racing 2D	Jussi Lind		WIN, LIN	2012-06-01	
Dyad	Right Square Bracket Left Square Bracket		PS3, WIN, OSX, LIN	2012-07-17	
Eagle Flight	Ubisoft Montreal	Ubisoft	WIN, PS4	2016-10-18	
Earn to Die 2	Toffee Games	Not Doppler	iOS, DROID, WIN	2014-11-20	
El Chavo Kart	Efecto Studios	Televisa	PS3, X360, DROID	2014-02-21	
Euro Truck Simulator 2	SCS Software		LIN, WIN, OSX	2012-10-19	
F1 2010	Codemasters Birmingham	Codemasters	WIN, PS3, X360	2010-09-22	
F1 2011	Codemaster Birmingham, Sumo Digital	Codemasters	WIN, PS3, X360, 3DS, PSV, iOS	2011-09-20	
F1 2012	Codemasters Birmingham, Feral Interactive	Codemasters, Feral Interactive	WIN, PS3, X360, OSX	2012-09-18	
F1 2013	Codemasters Birmingham, Feral Interactive	Codemasters, Feral Interactive, Bandai Namco Holdings	WIN, PS3, X360, OSX	2013-10-04	
F1 2014	Codemasters Birmingham	Codemasters	WIN, PS3, X360	2014-10-02	
F1 2015	Codemasters Birmingham	Codemasters	WIN, PS4, XOne	2015-07-10	
F1 2016	Codemasters Birmingham	Codemasters	WIN, PS4, XOne	2016-08-19	
F1 2017	Codemasters Birmingham	Codemasters	WIN, PS4, XOne	2017-08-25	
F1 2018	Codemasters Birmingham	Codemasters	WIN, PS4, XOne	2018-08-24	
F1 2019	Codemasters Birmingham	Codemasters	WIN, PS4, XOne	2019-06-28	
F1 Race Stars	Codemasters Birmingham	Codemasters	WIN, PS3, X360, WiiU	2012-11-13	
Fast & Furious: Showdown	Firebrand Games	Activision	WIN, PS3, X360, WiiU, 3DS	2013-05-21	
Fast & Furious: SuperCars	Raw Thrills		Arcade	2011	
Fast Beat Loop Racer	Saint-Fun International	UFO Interactive Games	Arcade, WIN	2011	
Fast Racing League	Shin'en Multimedia		Wii	2011-05-27	
Fast Racing Neo	Shin'en Multimedia		WiiU	2015-12-10	
Fast RMX	Shin'en Multimedia	Shin'en Multimedia, Nintendo	NX	2017-03-03	
Ferrari Virtual Academy	Kunos Simulazioni		WIN	2010-09-09	
FlatOut (Wii)	Team6 Game Studios	Funbox Media	Wii	2010-11	
FlatOut 3: Chaos & Destruction	Team6 Game Studios	Strategy First	WIN, DROID	2011-12-13	
FlatOut 4: Total Insanity	Kylotonn	Strategy First	WIN, PS4, XOne	2017-03-17	
Formula Fusion	R8 Games		WIN	2017-06-01	
Forza Horizon	Playground Games, Turn 10 Studios	Microsoft Studios	X360, XOne	2012-10-23	
Forza Horizon 2	Playground Games, Turn 10 Studios	Microsoft Studios, Sumo Digital	X360, XOne	2014-09-30	
Forza Horizon 2 Presents Fast & Furious	Playground Games, Turn 10 Studios	Microsoft Studios, Sumo Digital	X360, XOne	2015-03-27	
Forza Horizon 3	Playground Games	Microsoft Studios	WIN, XOne	2016-09-27	
Forza Horizon 4	Playground Games	Microsoft Studios	WIN, XOne	2018-10-02	
Forza Motorsport 4	Turn 10 Studios	Microsoft Studios	X360	2011-10-11	
Forza Motorsport 5	Turn 10 Studios	Microsoft Studios	XOne	2013-11-22	
Forza Motorsport 6	Turn 10 Studios	Microsoft Studios	WIN, XOne	2015-09-15	
Forza Motorsport 6: Apex	Turn 10 Studios	Microsoft Studios	WIN	2016-09-06	
Forza Motorsport 7	Turn 10 Studios	Microsoft Studios	WIN, XOne	2017-10-03	
Forza Street	Electric Square, Turn 10 Studios	Microsoft Studios	WIN, iOS, DROID	2018-05-08	
Free Rider HD	Kano/Apps	One More Level	WEB, iOS, DROID	2013	
Garfield Kart	Artefacts Studio	Anuman, Microïds	iOS, DROID, 3DS, Steam	2013-11-13	
Garfield Kart: Furious Racing	Artefacts Studio	Microids	WIN, OSX, PS4, XOne, NX	2019-11-06	
Gas Guzzlers Extreme	Gamepires	Iceberg Interactive	WIN	2013-10-08	
Gear.Club Unlimited	Eden Games	Anuman	NX	2017-11-21	
Gear.Club Unlimited 2	Eden Games	Microids	NX	2018-12-03	
GKART	Tencent	Garena	WIN	2010-10-01	
Glacier 3: The Meltdown	Team6 Game Studios	Funbox Media	WIN, Wii	2010-09-21	
Gran Turismo 5	Polyphony Digital	Sony Computer Entertainment	PS3	2010-11-24	
Gran Turismo 6	Polyphony Digital	Sony Computer Entertainment	PS3	2013-12-05	
Gran Turismo Sport	Polyphony Digital	Sony Interactive Entertainment	PS4	2017-10-17	
Grand Prix Story	Kairosoft		DROID, iOS	2012-04	
Grand Tour Game, The	Amazon Game Studios		PS4, XOne	2019-01-15	
Gravel	Milestone	Milestone, Square Enix	WIN, PS4, XOne	2018-02-27	
Grid	Codemasters		WIN, PS4, XOne	2019-10-11	
Grid 2	Codemasters Southam	Codemasters	WIN, PS3, X360	2013-05-27	
GRID Autosport	Codemasters		WIN, PS3, X360	2014-06-24	
Grip: Combat Racing	Caged Element	Wired Productions	WIN, PS4, XOne, NX	2018-11-06	
GT Racing 2: The Real Car Experience	Gameloft Bulgaria	Gameloft	iOS, DROID, BB10, WIN	2013-11-13	
Harms Way	Bongfish GmbH	Microsoft Game Studios	X360	2010-12-08	
Hello Kitty Kruisers	Scarab Entertainment	Bergsala-Lightweight	iOS, WiiU, NX	2014-03-21	
Hill Climb Racing	Fingersoft		iOS, DROID, WP, WIN	2012-09-22	
Hill Climb Racing 2	Fingersoft		DROID, iOS, WIN	2016-11-28	
Horizon Chase - World Tour	Aquiris Game Studio		iOS, DROID, WIN, PS4, XOne, NX	2015-09-20	
Hot Wheels Track Attack	Firebrand Games	THQ	Wii, DS	2010-11-23	
Hot Wheels: World's Best Driver	Firebrand Games	Warner Bros. Interactive Entertainment, Chillingo	WIN, PS3, X360, WiiU, 3DS	2013-09-17	
HTR High Tech Racing	QUByte Interactive		WIN, DROID, iOS, 3DS	2010-06-24	
Hydro Thunder Hurricane	Vector Unit	Microsoft Studios	X360, WIN	2010-07-28	
Insane 2	Targem Games	Game Factory Interactive	WIN	2011-09-30	
JellyCar 3	Creature Feep	Disney Interactive Studios	iOS, DROID, WP	2011-02-10	
Jet Car Stunts	Grip Games	BitComposer Entertainment	PS3, PSV, X360, XOne, WIN, DROID	2014-05-06	
Jimmie Johnson's Anything with an Engine	Isopod Labs	Autumn Games, Konami	PS3, Wii, X360	2011-11-01	
Joe Danger	Hello Games		PS3, X360, WIN, iOS, DROID, PSV	2010-06-08	
Joe Danger 2: The Movie	Hello Games		PS3, X360, OSX, LIN, PSV	2012-09-14	
Joe Danger Infinity	Hello Games		iOS	2014-01-09	
Joy Ride Turbo	BigPark	Microsoft Studios	X360	2012-05-23	
Kinect Joy Ride	BigPark	Microsoft Game Studios	X360	2010-11-04	
Lego Legends of Chima: Speedorz	Lego	TT Games	WIN, iOS	2013-01-03	
Little Racers	Milkstone Studios		X360, WIN, OSX, LIN	2011-07-27	
LittleBigPlanet Karting	United Front Games, Media Molecule	Sony Computer Entertainment	PS3	2012-11-06	
LocoCycle	Twisted Pixel Games	Microsoft Studios	WIN, X360, XOne	2013-11-22	
Mad Riders	Techland	Ubisoft	PS3, X360, WIN, OSX	2012-05-29	
Mario Kart 7	Nintendo EAD, Retro Studios	Nintendo	3DS	2011-12-01	
Mario Kart 8	Nintendo EAD, Bandai Namco Games	Nintendo	WiiU	2014-05-29	
Mario Kart 8 Deluxe	Nintendo EAD, Bandai Namco Games	Nintendo	NX	2017-04-28	
Mario Kart Arcade GP DX	Bandai Namco Games	Namco Bandai Games	Arcade	2013-07-25	
Mario Kart Tour	Nintendo EAD	Nintendo	iOS, DROID	2019-09-25	
Mario Sports Superstars	Bandai Namco Studios, Camelot Software Planning	Nintendo	3DS	2017-03-10	
Mayhem	Left Field Productions	Rombax Games	PS3, X360	2011-03-25	
Micro Machines World Series	Codemasters		WIN, PS4, XOne, LIN, OSX	2017-06-29	
Mini Motor Racing	The Binary Mill	Codemasters	WIN, iOS, DROID	2011-12-08	
ModNation Racers	United Front Games, San Diego Studio	Sony Computer Entertainment	PS3, PSP	2010-05-19	
ModNation Racers: Road Trip	San Diego Studio	Sony Computer Entertainment	PSV	2012-02-22	
Mole Kart	Shanghai Shengran Information Technology		iOS, DROID	2012-01-12	
Monster 4x4 3D	Ubisoft	Ubisoft	3DS	2012-06-08	
Monster Energy Supercross 2: The Official Videogame	Milestone		WIN, PS4, XOne, NX	2019-02-08	
Monster Energy Supercross: The Official Videogame	Milestone		WIN, PS4, XOne, NX	2018-02-13	
Monster Jam: Crush It!	Team6	GameMill Entertainment	PS4, XOne, NX	2016-10-25	
Monster Jam: Path of Destruction	Virtuos	Activision	Wii, PS3, X360, DS, PSP	2010-11-09	
Monster Jam: Steel Titans	Rainbow Studios	THQ Nordic	WIN, PS4, XOne, NX	2019-06-25	
Moto Racer 4	Microïds	Anuman	WIN, OSX, PS4, XOne	2016-11-03	
Motocross Madness (2013)	Bongfish	Microsoft Game Studios	X360	2013-04-10	
MotoGP 09/10	Monumental Games	Capcom	PS3, X360	2010-03-16	
MotoGP 10/11	Monumental Games	Capcom	PS3, X360	2011-03-15	
MotoGP 13	Milestone		WIN, PS3, PSV, X360	2013-06-17	
MotoGP 14	Milestone		WIN, PS3, X360, PSV, PS4	2014-06-20	
MotoGP 15	Milestone	Milestone, Bandai Namco Entertainment	WIN, PS3, PS4, X360, XOne	2015-06-24	
MotoGP 17	Milestone		WIN, PS4, XOne	2017-06-15	
MotoGP 18	Milestone		WIN, PS4, XOne, NX	2018-06-07	
MotoGP 19	Milestone		WIN, PS4, XOne	2019-06-06	
MotoHeroz	RedLynx		Wii, iOS	2011-09-15	
MotorStorm: Apocalypse	Evolution Studios	Sony Computer Entertainment	PS3	2011-03-16	
MotorStorm: RC	Evolution Studios	Sony Computer Entertainment	PS3, PSV	2012-02-22	
MX vs. ATV Alive	Rainbow Studios	THQ	PS3, X360	2011-05-10	
MX vs. ATV All Out	Rainbow Studios	THQ Nordic	WIN, PS4, XOne	2018-03-27	
MX vs. ATV Supercross	Rainbow Studios	Nordic Games	WIN, PS3, X360, PS4, XOne	2014-10-28	
MXGP 2019	Milestone		WIN, PS4, XOne	2019-08-27	
MXGP Pro	Milestone		WIN, PS4, XOne	2018-07-10	
MXGP The Official Motocross Videogame	Milestone		WIN, PS3, PS4, PSV, X360, XOne	2014-11-18	
MXGP2	Milestone		WIN, PS4, XOne	2016-06-21	
MXGP3	Milestone		WIN, PS4, XOne, NX	2017-05-30	
MySims SkyHeroes	Behaviour Interactive	Electronic Arts	DS, PS3, Wii, X360	2010-09-28	
Nail'd	Techland	Deep Silver	WIN, PS3, X360	2010-11-30	
NASCAR '14	Eutechnyx	Deep Silver	WIN, PS3, X360	2014-02-18	
NASCAR '15	Eutechnyx	Dusenberry Martin Racing	WIN, PS3, X360	2015-05-22	
NASCAR Heat 2	Monster Games	704Games	WIN, PS4, XOne	2017-09-12	
NASCAR Heat 3	Monster Games	704Games	WIN, PS4, XOne	2018-09-07	
NASCAR Heat 4	Monster Games	704Games	WIN, PS4, XOne	2019-09-13	
NASCAR Heat Evolution	Monster Games	Dusenberry Martin Racing	WIN, PS4, XOne	2016-09-13	
NASCAR The Game: 2011	Eutechnyx	Activision	PS3, X360, Wii	2011-03-29	
NASCAR The Game: 2013	Eutechnyx	Activision	WIN	2013-07-24	
NASCAR The Game: Inside Line	Eutechnyx	Activision	WIN, PS3, Wii, X360	2012-11-06	
NASCAR Unleashed	Firebrand Games	Activision	Wii, PS3, X360, 3DS	2011-11-01	
Need for Speed (2015)	Ghost Games	Electronic Arts	WIN, PS4, XOne	2015-11-03	
Need for Speed Heat	Ghost Games	Electronic Arts	WIN, PS4, XOne	2019-11-08	
Need for Speed Payback	Ghost Games	Electronic Arts	WIN, PS4, XOne	2017-11-10	
Need for Speed: Hot Pursuit	Criterion Games	Electronic Arts	WIN, PS3, Wii, X360, iOS, DROID, webOS, WP	2010-11-16	
Need for Speed: Most Wanted	Criterion Games, Firemonkeys Studios	Electronic Arts	WIN, PS3, PSV, X360, iOS, DROID, FOS, WiiU	2012-10-30	
Need for Speed: Rivals	Ghost Games	Electronic Arts	WIN, PS3, PS4, X360, XOne	2013-11-15	
Need for Speed: The Run	EA Black Box, Firebrand Games	Electronic Arts	WIN, PS3, X360, Wii, 3DS	2011-11-15	
Need for Speed: World	EA Black Box	Electronic Arts	WIN	2010-07-27	
NeuroRacer	University of California, San Francisco			2013	
Nickelodeon Kart Racers	Bamtang Games	GameMill Entertainment	NX, PS4, XOne	2018-10-23	
Nitro Nation Online	Creative Mobile		DROID, iOS, WP	2014-04-03	
Offroad Legends	DogByte Games		iOS, DROID	2012-06	
Onrush	Codemasters	Deep Silver	WIN, PS4, XOne	2018-06-05	
Pacer	R8 Games		WIN	2017-06-01	
Pako 2	Tree Men Games		WIN, OSX, iOS, DROID	2017-11-26	
Pop Island - Paperfield	ODENIS Studio		DS	2010-07-15	
Pro Cycling Manager 2014: Le Tour de France	Cyanide	Focus Home Interactive	WIN	2014-06-19	
Pro Cycling Manager 2015	Cyanide	Focus Home Interactive	WIN	2015-06-18	
Pro Cycling Manager 2016	Cyanide	Focus Home Interactive	WIN	2016-06-16	
Pro Cycling Manager 2017	Cyanide	Focus Home Interactive	WIN	2017-06-15	
Pro Cycling Manager 2018: Le Tour de France	Cyanide	Focus Home Interactive	WIN	2018-06-28	
Pro Cycling Manager Season 2010: Le Tour de France	Cyanide	Focus Home Interactive	WIN, PSP	2010-06-16	
Pro Cycling Manager Season 2011: Le Tour de France	Cyanide	Focus Home Interactive	WIN	2011-06-24	
Pro Cycling Manager Season 2012: Le Tour de France	Cyanide	Focus Home Interactive	WIN	2012-06-22	
Pro Cycling Manager Season 2013: Le Tour de France	Cyanide	Focus Home Interactive	WIN	2013-06-21	
Pro Cycling Manager Season 2019	Cyanide	Nacon	WIN	2019-06-27	
Project CARS	Slightly Mad Studios	Bandai Namco Games	WIN, PS4, XOne, WiiU	2015-05-08	
Project CARS 2	Slightly Mad Studios	Bandai Namco Games	WIN, PS4, XOne, WiiU	2017-09-22	
Pyongyang Racer	Nosotek	Koryo Tours	WEB	2012-12-19	
Racer	Ruud van Gaal		WIN, LIN, OSX	2012-08-09	
RaceRoom	Sector3 Studios	RaceRoom Entertainment AG	WIN	2013-02-12	
Radial-G: Racing Revolved	Tammeka Games		Quest, Steam, PS4, PSVR, GD	2016-03-28	
Real Racing 2	Firemint		iOS, DROID, OSX, WP	2010-12-16	
Real Racing 3	Firemonkeys Studios	EA Games	iOS, DROID, NX, BB10	2013-02-28	
Redout	34BigThings	34BigThings, Nicalis, 505 Games	WIN, PS4, XOne, NX	2016-09-02	
rFactor 2	Image Space Incorporated		WIN	2013	
Ride	Milestone		WIN, PS3, PS4, X360, XOne	2015-03-27	
Ride 2	Milestone		WIN, PS4, XOne	2016-10-07	
Ride 3	Milestone		WIN, PS4, XOne	2018-11-30	
Ridge Racer (Vita) (2011)	Cellius	Namco	PSV	2011-12-17	
Ridge Racer 3D	Namco Bandai Games	Namco	3DS	2011-02-26	
Ridge Racer Unbounded	Bugbear Entertainment	Bandai Namco Games	WIN, PS3, X360	2012-03-27	
Road Rage	Team6 Game Studios	Maximum Games	WIN, PS4, XOne	2017-11-14	
Road Redemption	Pixel Dash Studios	EQ Games	LIN, WIN, OSX, NX, PS4, XOne	2017-10-04	
Rock of Ages	ACE Team	Atlus, Sega	WIN, PS3, X360	2011-08-31	
Rock of Ages II: Bigger & Boulder	ACE Team	Atlus, Sega	WIN, PS4, XOne	2017-08-28	
Rocket League	Psyonix		WIN, PS4, XOne, OSX, LIN, NX	2015-07-07	
Roundabout	No Goblin		WIN, OSX, LIN, PS4, XOne, PSV	2014-09-18	
Runbow	13AM Games		WIN, PS4, XOne, WiiU, NX, 3DS	2015-08-27	
SBK 2011	Milestone	Black Bean Games	WIN, PS3, X360	2011-05-13	
SBK X: Superbike World Championship	Milestone	Black Bean Games	WIN, PS3, X360	2010-10-19	
Scrap Metal	Slick Entertainment	Microsoft Game Studios	X360	2010-03-10	
Sébastien Loeb Rally Evo	Milestone		WIN, PS4, XOne	2016-01-29	
Shift 2: Unleashed	Slightly Mad Studios, Straight Right	Electronic Arts	WIN, PS3, X360, iOS	2011-03-29	
Sibak Al Fursan	Kuma Reality Games		WIN	2010-12-17	
Simraceway	Ignite Game Technologies		WIN	2011-11	
Sky Punks	Fathom Interactive	Rovio Stars	iOS, DROID	2015-04-09	
SkyDrift	Digital Reality		WIN, PS3, PSN, X360	2011-09-06	
Skylanders: SuperChargers	Vicarious Visions, Beenox	Activision	PS3, PS4, X360, XOne, WiiU, iOS, 3DS, Wii	2015-09-20	
Snuggle Truck	Owlchemy Labs		iOS, OSX, WIN, BB10, MEEGO, LIN, DROID	2011-04-28	
Sonic & All-Stars Racing Transformed	Sumo Digital	Sega	WIN, PS3, X360, WiiU, PSV, 3DS, iOS, DROID	2012-11-16	
Sonic & Sega All-Stars Racing	Sumo Digital, Gameloft, Feral Interactive	Sega, Feral Interactive	WIN, X360, Wii, PS3, DS, OSX, Arcade, iOS, DROID, BB10	2010-02-23	
Sonic Free Riders	Sonic Team	Sega	X360	2010-11-04	
Speed	Team6 Game Studios	Funbox Media	Wii	2010	
Speed 2	Team6 Game Studios	Easy Interactive	Wii	2012-11-28	
Speed Dreams	The Speed Dreams Team	Microsoft	LIN, WIN, AmiOS, BEOS	2010-03-27	
SpeedRunners	DoubleDutch Games	tinyBuild	WIN, OSX, LIN, PS4, XOne	2016-04-19	
Spintires	Pavel Zagrebelnyj	Oovee Game Studios	WIN	2014-06-13	
Spintires: MudRunner	Saber Interactive	Focus Home Interactive	WIN, PS4, XOne, NX	2017-10-31	
Split/Second	Black Rock Studio, Sumo Digital	Disney Interactive Studios	WIN, PS3, X360, iOS, PSP	2010-05-18	
SpongeBob's Boating Bash	ImPulse Games	THQ	Wii, DS	2010-03-02	
Spy Hunter (2012)	TT Fusion	Warner Bros. Interactive Entertainment	3DS, PSV	2012-10-09	
Street Outlaws: The List	Team6 Game Studios	GameMill Entertainment	WIN, PS4, XOne, NX	2019-10-22	
Super Sonic Racer	Team6 Game Studios	Funbox Media	WIN	2018-03-09	
Super Street: Racer	Lion Castle Entertainment	Funbox Media	NX	2019-11-07	
Super Street: The Game	Team6	Lion Castle Entertainment	WIN, PS4, XOne	2018-09-10	
Superstars V8 Next Challenge	Milestone	Deep Silver, Black Bean Games	WIN, PS3, X360, PSN	2010-02-26	
Swing Racers	Morepork Games Limited		iOS	2015-06-17	
Table Top Racing	Playrise Digital		WIN, iOS, DROID, PS4, PSV, XOne	2013-01-31	
Team Sonic Racing	Sumo Digital	Sega	WIN, PS4, XOne, NX	2019-05-21	
Test Drive Unlimited 2	Eden Games	Atari SA	WIN, PS3, X360	2011-02-08	
Test Drive: Ferrari Racing Legends	Slightly Mad Studios	Rombax Games	WIN, PS3, X360	2012-07-03	
Things on Wheels	Load Inc.	Focus Home Interactive	WIN, X360	2010-05-12	
Thumb Drift	SMG Studios		iOS, DROID	2016	
TNT Racers	DTP Entertainment		Wii, PSP, PS3, X360, WiiU	2010-12-01	
Touch Racing Nitro	Bravo Game Studios		iOS, PSP, PS3, DROID	2010-03-29	
Tour de France 2013: 100th Edition, Le	Cyanide	Focus Home Interactive	PS3, X360	2013-07-02	
Tour de France, Le	Cyanide	Focus Home Interactive	PS3, X360	2011-07-01	
Toybox Turbos	Codemasters	Codemasters Racing	WIN, PS3, X360	2014-11-12	
TrackMania 2: Canyon	Nadeo	Ubisoft	WIN	2011-09-14	
TrackMania 2: Lagoon	Nadeo	Ubisoft	WIN	2017-05-23	
TrackMania 2: Stadium	Nadeo	Ubisoft	WIN	2013-06-20	
TrackMania Turbo	Firebrand Games	DreamCatcher Interactive, Focus Home Interactive	DS	2010-09-23	
TrackMania Turbo	Nadeo	Ubisoft	WIN, PS4, XOne	2016-03-22	
TrackMania: Build to Race	Firebrand Games	Focus Home Interactive, DreamCatcher Interactive	Wii	2010-09-23	
Trailblazers	Supergonk	Rising Star Games	WIN, PS4, XOne, NX	2018-05-08	
Trials Evolution	RedLynx	Ubisoft, Microsoft Studios	WIN, X360	2012-04-18	
Trials Fusion	RedLynx	Ubisoft	WIN, PS4, X360, XOne	2014-04-15	
Trials of the Blood Dragon	RedLynx	Ubisoft	WIN, PS4, XOne	2016-06-13	
Trials Rising	RedLynx	Ubisoft	WIN, PS4, XOne, NX	2019-02-26	
Turbo Racing League	PikPok		iOS, DROID, WP	2013-05-16	
Turbo: Super Stunt Squad	Monkey Bar Games, Torus Games	D3 Publisher	PS3, X360, WiiU, Wii, 3DS, DS	2013-07-16	
Twisted Metal (2012)	Eat Sleep Play	Sony Computer Entertainment	PS3	2012-2-14	
Urban Trial Freestyle	Tate Interactive		WIN, PS3, 3DS, iOS, PSV	2013-02-19	
V-Rally 4	Kylotonn	Bigben Interactive	WIN, PS4, XOne	2018-09-06	
Valentino Rossi: The Game	Milestone		WIN, PS4, XOne	2016-06-16	
VS. Racing 2	Maciek Drejak Labs		iOS	2012-09-06	
Wangan Midnight Maximum Tune 4	Bandai Namco Entertainment		Arcade	2011-12-15	
Wangan Midnight Maximum Tune 5	Bandai Namco Entertainment		Arcade	2014-03-12	
Wangan Midnight Maximum Tune 6	Bandai Namco Entertainment		Arcade	2018-07-12	
Wipeout 2048	Psygnosis	Sony Computer Entertainment	PSV	2012-01-19	
Wipeout Omega Collection	EPOS Game Studios	Sony Interactive Entertainment	PS4	2017-06-06	
World of Cars Online, The	Disney Interactive Media Group	The Walt Disney Company	WIN, OSX	2010-03-01	
World of Outlaws: Sprint Cars	Big Ant Studios	THQ	PS3, X360	2010-02-09	
World of Speed	Saber Interactive	Mad Dog Games	WIN, Steam	2017-09-22	
WRC 2: FIA World Rally Championship	Milestone	Black Bean Games, CyberFront	WIN, PS3, X360	2011-10-14	
WRC 3: FIA World Rally Championship	Milestone	Black Bean Games	WIN, PS3, PSV, X360	2012-10-12	
WRC 4: FIA World Rally Championship	Milestone	Black Bean Games	WIN, PS3, X360, PSV	2013-10-25	
WRC 5	Kylotonn	Bigben Interactive	WIN, PS3, PS4, X360, XOne, PSV	2015-10-13	
WRC 6	Kylotonn	Bigben Interactive	WIN, PS4, XOne	2016-10-07	
WRC 7	Kylotonn	Bigben Interactive	WIN, PS4, XOne	2017-09-15	
WRC 8	Kylotonn	Bigben Interactive	WIN, PS4, XOne, NX	2019-09-05	
WRC Powerslide	Milestone		WIN, PS3, X360	2013-03-12	
WRC: FIA World Rally Championship	Milestone	Black Bean Games	WIN, PS3, X360	2010-10-07	
Wrecked: Revenge Revisited	Supersonic Software	505 Games	PS3, X360	2012-03-28	
Wreckfest	Bugbear Entertainment	THQ Nordic	WIN, PS4, XOne, NX	2018-06-14	
X Games SnoCross	2XL Games	ESPN	iOS	2010-01-18	
X Motor Racing	Exotypos		WIN	2013-12-30	
Xenon Racer	3DClouds	Soedesco	WIN, PS4, XOne, NX	2019-03-26	

=== 2020s ===
Title	Developer	Publisher	Platforms	Release date	Ref.
Art of Rally	Funselektor Labs		WIN, OSX, LIN, PS4, PS5, XOne, XSX/S, NX	2020-09-23	
Assetto Corsa EVO	Kunos Simulazioni	Kunos Simulazioni and 505 Games	WIN	2025-01-16 (Early access)	
Assetto Corsa Rally	Supernova Games Studios and Kunos Simulazioni	505 Games	WIN	2025-11-13 (Early access)	
Automobilista 2	Reiza Studios		WIN	2020-03-31	
Bus Simulator 21	Stillalive Studios	Astragon	WIN, PS4, XOne	2021-09-07	
Bus Simulator City Ride	Stillalive Studios	Astragon	iOS, DROID, NX	2022-10-13	
Chocobo GP	Square Enix		NX	2022-03-10	
Circuit Superstars	Original Fire Games	Square Enix	WIN, PS4, XOne, NX	2021-10-12	
Clutch	Maverick Games		WIN, PS5, XSX/S	2027	
Crazy Taxi: World Tour	Sega		WIN, PS5, XSX/S, NX2	2027	
Crew Motorfest, The	Ivory Tower	Ubisoft	WIN, PS4, PS5, XOne, XSX/S	2023-09-14	
Dakar Desert Rally	Saber Interactive		WIN, PS4, PS5, XOne, XSX/S	2022-10-04	
Destruction AllStars	Lucid Games	Sony Interactive Entertainment	PS5	2021-02-02	
Dirt 5	Codemasters Cheshire	Codemasters	WIN, PS4, PS5, XOne, XSX/S	2020-11-06	
Disney Speedstorm	Gameloft Barcelona	Gameloft	WIN, PS4, PS5, XOne, XSX/S, NX, iOS, DROID	2023-09-28	
EA Sports WRC	Codemasters	EA Sports	WIN, PS5, XSX/S	2023-11-03	
Expeditions: A MudRunner Game	Saber Interactive	Focus Home Interactive	WIN, PS4, PS5, XOne, XSX/S, NX	2024-03-05	
F1 2020	Codemasters Birmingham	Codemasters	WIN, PS4, XOne	2020-07-10	
F1 2021	Codemasters	EA Sports	WIN, PS4, PS5, XOne, XSX/S	2021-07-16	
F1 22	Codemasters	EA Sports	WIN, PS4, PS5, XOne, XSX/S	2022-07-01	
F1 23	Codemasters	EA Sports	WIN, PS4, PS5, XOne, XSX/S	2023-06-16	
F1 24	Codemasters	EA Sports	WIN, PS4, PS5, XOne, XSX/S	2024-05-31	
F1 25	Codemasters	EA Sports	WIN, PS5, XSX/S	2025-05-30	
F1 Manager 2022	Frontier Developments		WIN, PS4, PS5, XOne, XSX/S	2022-08-30	
F1 Manager 2023	Frontier Developments		WIN, PS4, PS5, XOne, XSX/S	2023-07-31	
Fast & Furious Crossroads	Slightly Mad Studios	Namco Bandai Games	WIN, PS4, XOne	2020-08-07	
Fast & Furious: Spy Racers Rise of SH1FT3R	3DClouds	Outright Games	WIN, PS4, PS5, XOne, XSX/S, NX	2021-11-05	
Fast Fusion	Shin'en Multimedia		NX2	2025-09-18	
Formula Legends	3DClouds		WIN, NX, PS4, PS5, XOne, XSX/S	2025-09-18	
Forza Customs	Hutch	Microsoft Studios, Hutch	iOS, DROID	2023-11-14	
Forza Horizon 5	Playground Games	Xbox Game Studios	WIN, PS5, XOne, XSX/S	2021-11-09	
Forza Horizon 6	Playground Games	Xbox Game Studios	WIN, PS5, XSX/S	2026-05-19	
Forza Motorsport	Turn 10 Studios	Xbox Game Studios	WIN, XSX/S	2023-10-10	
Gear.Club Unlimited 2 - Ultimate Edition	Eden Games	Microids	WIN, PS4, PS5, XOne, XSX/S	2021-12-07	
Gear.Club Unlimited 3	Eden Games	Nacon	NS2	2026-02-19	
Gran Turismo 7	Polyphony Digital	Sony Interactive Entertainment	PS4, PS5	2022-03-04	
Grid Legends	Codemasters	Electronic Arts	WIN, PS4, PS5, XOne, XSX/S	2022-02-25	
Horizon Chase 2	Aquiris Game Studio		iOS, OSX, WIN, PS4, PS5, XOne, XSX/S, NX	2022-09-07	
Hot Wheels Infinite Rush	Milestone		WIN, PS5, XSX/S, NX2	2026-09-10	
Hot Wheels Unleashed	Milestone		WIN, PS4, PS5, XOne, XSX/S, NX	2021-09-30	
Hot Wheels Unleashed 2: Turbocharged	Milestone		WIN, PS4, PS5, XOne, XSX/S, NX	2023-10-19	
Hotshot Racing	Sumo Digital	Curve Digital	WIN, PS4, XOne, NX	2020-09-10	
IndyCar Racing The Game	iRacing Studios		WIN, PS5, XSX/S	2027	
iRacing Arcade	Original Fire Games	iRacing Studios	WIN, PS5, XSX/S	2026-03-03	
Kandagawa Jet Girls	Honey∞Parade Games	Marvelous, Xseed Games	WIN, PS4	2020-02-14	
KartKraft	Motorsport Games, Black Delta	Motorsport Games	WIN	2022-01-26	
KartRider: Drift	Nexon		WIN, PS4, PS5, XOne, XSX/S, iOS	2023-01-10	
Kirby Air Riders	Bandai Namco Studios	Nintendo	NX2	2025-11-20	
Le Mans Ultimate	Studio 397	Motorsport Games	WIN	2025-07-22	
Lego 2K Drive	Visual Concepts	2K	WIN, PS4, PS5, XOne, XSX/S, NX	2023-05-19	
Live for Speed S3	Scawen Roberts, Eric Bailey and Victor van Vlaardingen		WIN	2023-12-17	
Mario Kart Live: Home Circuit	Velan Studios	Nintendo	NX	2020-10-16	
Mario Kart World	Nintendo EPD, Monolith Soft, 1-Up Studio, Bandai Namco Studios	Nintendo	NX2	2025-06-05	
Monster Energy Supercross 25	Milestone		WIN, PS4, PS5, XOne, XSX/S, NX	2025-04-10	
Monster Energy Supercross 3: The Official Videogame	Milestone		WIN, PS4, XOne, NX	2020-02-03	
Monster Energy Supercross 4: The Official Videogame	Milestone		WIN, PS4, PS5, XOne, XSX/S	2021-03-11	
Monster Energy Supercross 5: The Official Videogame	Milestone		WIN, PS4, PS5, XOne, XSX/S	2022-03-17	
Monster Energy Supercross 6: The Official Videogame	Milestone		WIN, PS4, PS5, XOne, XSX/S	2023-03-09	
Monster Jam Showdown	Milestone	THQ Nordic	WIN, PS4, PS5, XOne, XSX/S, NX	2024-08-29	
Monster Jam: Steel Titans 2	Rainbow Studios	THQ Nordic	WIN, PS4, PS5, XOne, XSX/S, NX	2021-03-02	
MotoGP 20	Milestone		WIN, PS4, XOne, NX	2020-04-23	
MotoGP 21	Milestone		WIN, PS4, PS5, XOne, XSX/S, NX	2021-04-22	
MotoGP 22	Milestone		WIN, PS4, PS5, XOne, XSX/S, NX	2022-04-21	
MotoGP 23	Milestone		WIN, PS4, PS5, XOne, XSX/S, NX	2023-06-08	
MotoGP 24	Milestone		WIN, PS4, PS5, XOne, XSX/S, NX	2024-05-02	
MotoGP 25	Milestone		WIN, PS4, PS5, XOne, XSX/S, NX	2025-04-30	
MotoGP 26	Milestone		WIN, PS5, XSX/S, NX	2026-04-29	
MX vs. ATV Legends	Rainbow Studios	THQ Nordic	WIN, PS4, PS5, XOne	2022-06-28	
MXGP 2020	Milestone		WIN, PS4, PS5, XOne, XSX/S	2020-12-16	
MXGP 2021	Milestone		WIN, PS4, PS5, XOne, XSX/S	2021-11-30	
NASCAR 21: Ignition	Monster Games	Motorsport Games	WIN, PS4, PS5, XOne, XSX/S, NX	2021-10-26	
NASCAR 25	Monster Games	iRacing Studios	WIN, PS5, XSX/S	2025-10-14	
NASCAR 26	iRacing Studios	iRacing Studios	WIN, PS5, XSX/S	2026-09-15	
NASCAR Arcade Rush	Team6 Game Studios	GameMill Entertainment	WIN, PS4, PS5, XOne, XSX/S, NX	2023-09-15	
NASCAR Heat 5	704Games	Motorsport Games	WIN, PS4, XOne	2020-07-07	
NASCAR Rivals	Monster Games	Motorsport Games	NX	2022-10-14	
Need for Speed Unbound	Criterion Games	Electronic Arts	WIN, PS5, XSX/S	2022-12-02	
NHRA Championship Drag Racing: Speed for All	Team6 Game Studios	GameMill Entertainment	WIN, PS4, PS5, XOne, XSX/S, NX	2022-08-26	
Nickelodeon Kart Racers 2: Grand Prix	Bamtang Games	GameMill Entertainment	WIN, PS4, PS5, XOne, XSX/S, NX	2022-10-14	
Nickelodeon Kart Racers 3: Slime Speedway	Bamtang Games	GameMill Entertainment, Maximum Games	NX, PS4, XOne	2020-10-06	
Nintendo Switch Sports Resort	Nintendo EPD	Nintendo	NX2	2026-10-22	
Overpass	Zordix	Nacon	WIN, PS4, XOne, NX	2020-02-12	
Pro Cycling Manager 2020	Cyanide	Nacon	WIN	2020-06-04	
Pro Cycling Manager 2021	Cyanide	Nacon	WIN	2021-06-03	
Pro Cycling Manager 2022	Cyanide	Nacon	WIN	2022-06-09	
Pro Cycling Manager 2023	Cyanide	Nacon	WIN	2023-06-08	
Project CARS 3	Slightly Mad Studios	Bandai Namco Games	WIN, PS4, XOne	2020-08-20	
Project Motor Racing	Straight4 Studios	Giants Software	WIN, PS5, XSX/S	2025-11-25	
Rennsport	Competition Company and Teyon	Competition Company	WIN, PS5, XSX/S	2025-11-13	
Ride 4	Milestone		WIN, PS4, PS5, XOne, XSX/S	2020-10-08	
Ride 5	Milestone		WIN, PS5, XSX/S	2023-08-24	
Ride 6	Milestone		WIN, PS5, XSX/S	2026-02-12	
Riders Republic	Ubisoft Annecy	Ubisoft	WIN, PS4, PS5, XOne, XSX/S	2021-10-28	
Rocket Racing	Psyonix	Epic Games	WIN, PS4, PS5, XOne, XSX/S, NX, DROID	2023-12-08	
SBK 22	Milestone		WIN, PS4, PS5, XOne, XSX/S	2022-09-15	
Screamer	Milestone	Plaion	WIN, PS5, XSX/S	2026-03-26	
SnowRunner	Saber Interactive	Focus Home Interactive	WIN, PS4, XOne	2020-04-28	
Sonic Racing: CrossWorlds	Sonic Team	Sega	WIN, PS4, PS5, XOne, XSX/S, NX	2025-09-25	
SRX: The Game	Monster Games		WIN, PS4, PS5, XOne, XSX/S	2021-05-28	
Star Wars: Galactic Racer	Fuse Games	Secret Mode	WIN, PS5, XSX/S	2026-10-06	
Street Outlaws 2: Winner Takes All	Team6 Game Studios	GameMill Entertainment	WIN, PS4, PS5, XOne, XSX/S, NX	2021-09-20	
Taxi Chaos	Team6 Game Studios	Lion Castle Entertainment	WIN, PS4, XOne, NX	2021-02-23	
Test Drive Unlimited Solar Crown	JT Racing	Nacon	WIN, PS5, XSX/S	2024-09-12	
Tokyo Xtreme Racer	Genki		WIN, PS5	2025-09-25	
Tony Stewart's Sprint Car Racing	Monster Games		WIN, PS4, XOne	2020-02-14	
Tour de France 2021	Cyanide	Nacon	WIN, PS4, XOne, XSX/S	2021-06-03	
Tour de France 2022	Cyanide	Nacon	WIN, PS4, PS5, XOne, XSX/S	2022-06-09	
Tour de France 2023	Cyanide	Nacon	WIN, PS4, PS5, XOne, XSX/S	2023-06-08	
Tour de France 2024	Cyanide	Nacon	WIN, PS4, PS5, XSX/S	2024-06-06	
Trackmania	Nadeo	Ubisoft	WIN, PS4, PS5, XOne, XSX/S	2020-07-01	
Truck-kun is Supporting Me from Another World?!	Strange Scaffold	Frosty Pop Games	WIN, XSX/S	2026-07-29	
Turbo Golf Racing	Hugecalf Studios		WIN, PS5, XOne, XSX/S	2024-04-04	
What the Car?	Triband		WIN, iOS, OSX, tvOS	2023-05-04	
Wheel World	Messhof	Annapurna Interactive	WIN, PS5, XSX/S	2025-07-23	
WRC 10	Kylotonn	Nacon	WIN, PS4, PS5, XOne, XSX/S, NX	2021-09-02	
WRC 9	Kylotonn	Nacon	WIN, PS4, PS5, XOne, XSX/S, NX	2020-09-03	
WRC Generations	Kylotonn	Nacon	WIN, PS4, PS5, XOne, XSX/S	2022-11-03	
Wreckfest 2	Bugbear Entertainment	THQ Nordic	WIN	2025-03-20 (Early access)	
Wreckreation	Three Fields Entertainment	THQ Nordic	WIN, PS5, XSX/S	2025-10-28	
Zero Racers	Nintendo R&D1	Nintendo	VB	2026-08-04	

=== Unreleased ===
Title	Developer	Publisher	Platforms	Release date	Ref.
Gun Beat	Treasure		Arcade	Unreleased	
IMSA World Championship Racing	Studio 3DO		M2	Unreleased	
Lamborghini	Rage Software	Majesco	WIN, PS2, XBOX, GCN	Unreleased	
Nitro Racers	Torc Interactive	The 3DO Company	DOS	Unreleased	
Rev Limit	SETA Corporation		Arcade, 64DD, N64	Unreleased	
Vic Viper	Konami		Arcade	Unreleased	

== See also ==
- Formula One video games
- V8 Supercars in video games
- Racing video game
- Sim racing
