= TrackMania Nations =

2006 video game

- Box art
- Developer: Nadeo
- Publishers: Focus Home Interactive; Deep Silver
- Director: Florent Castelnérac
- Series: TrackMania
- Platform: Windows
- Release: WW: January 27, 2006; (TMN): WW: April 16, 2008; (TMNF)
- Genre: Racing
- Modes: Single-player, multiplayer

TrackMania Nations (TMN, subtitled Electronic Sports World Cup, often abbreviated to ESWC) is a racing game developed by Nadeo and published on PC by Focus Home Interactive in France on January 27, 2006. A sequel to Sunrise, from which it borrows its concept, it was developed specifically for the ESWC international competition. To compensate for the lack of financial income, Nadeo integrates advertisements into the game. When it was released, the game offered an atypical approach compared to other games of the same genre, with its simple arcade-style gameplay, level editor, ease of sharing creations, and interesting multiplayer mode. Offered free of charge so that all players could train for the world competition, it featured a single environment called Stadium, representing a large stadium. Only one car with a single driving style was available: a kind of Formula 1 single-seater resembling an Ariel Atom, which required speed and skill.

Despite limited media coverage, Nations was very well received by the specialist press. The game quickly racked up several million downloads. In mid-April 2008, Nadeo released TrackMania Nations Forever and TrackMania United Forever, two expansions for Nations and TrackMania United, which mainly allow these two games to be played together in multiplayer mode. This standalone expansion also received positive reviews from observers. Nations and TrackMania Nations Forever are played at various LAN parties as well as in numerous competitions. The ESWC included both versions of the game from 2006 to 2012. This allowed Nadeo to enter the exclusive circle of high-level esports. Nations is part of a very prolific series with numerous sequels.

== Gameplay ==
=== General ===
TrackMania Nations is a race game displayed in a third-person view. It follows the arcade-focused concept established by the two previous games in the series, contrasting with the gameplay of competing racing games that focus on simulation and precision. Specifically, there are still no collisions between cars. Cars pass through each other like ghost vehicles if their trajectories cross or overlap. Players race alone on the track in both multiplayer and single-player modes, so it is impossible to touch or push an opponent. The game offers only one car with unique handling and no adjustments, apart from the distinctive body color representing each nation. Nations uses a simple control system with four buttons for braking, accelerating, and steering, as well as two additional buttons for restarting the game. There is also a horn. During jumps, the player can brake or accelerate to influence the car's trajectory.

Players participate in timed races that take place on circuits or tracks where they must reach the finish line by passing through checkpoints. Checkpoints are represented by arches above the track, some of which are sometimes placed in unexpected locations. The player must therefore achieve the best possible time and can win three medals for each track: bronze, silver, and gold. These are obtained by completing the circuit within a set time. Players can also earn the “Nadeo record” which is even more difficult to obtain than in previous games.

Nations introduces many new features. The revamped game engine offers improved graphics compared to its predecessors. The game includes around 100 pre-built tracks with gradually increasing difficulty. An internet connection is required to play the game in order to create an account. The cars can also drive on the walls. Nations includes a scoring system with global, national and regional rankings for each race. At the end of each race, the rankings are automatically updated and displayed. To establish these rankings, each player earns points based on the races and their results. The number of points earned in multiplayer mode is calculated by an algorithm based on the player's results and the number of opponents in a game.

The Nations Forever expansion offers graphics upgraded to the level of those in TrackMania United, as well as sixty-five new races. This version also features a new interface, which is largely based on the one used in TrackMania United. The game includes the ManiaLink, ManiaZone, and United ranking systems. To climb the solo rankings, players must earn skill points by achieving good lap times. Points earned vary depending on the ranking and the number of potential opponents. In multiplayer mode, a completely independent system manages the rankings: ladder points. This system, which takes into account the player's progress, awards points to a player based on their results and the level of their opponents.

=== Environment ===
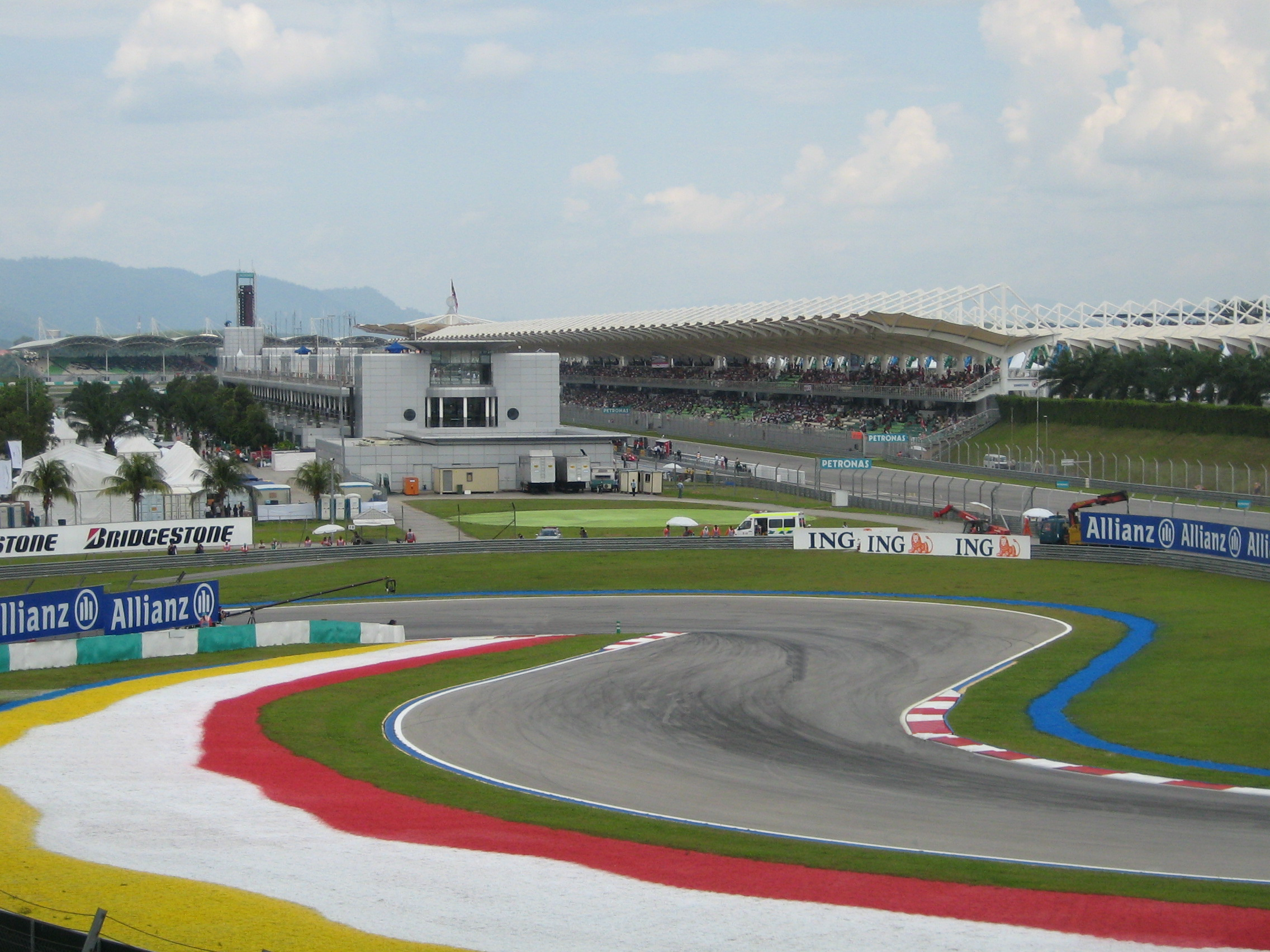
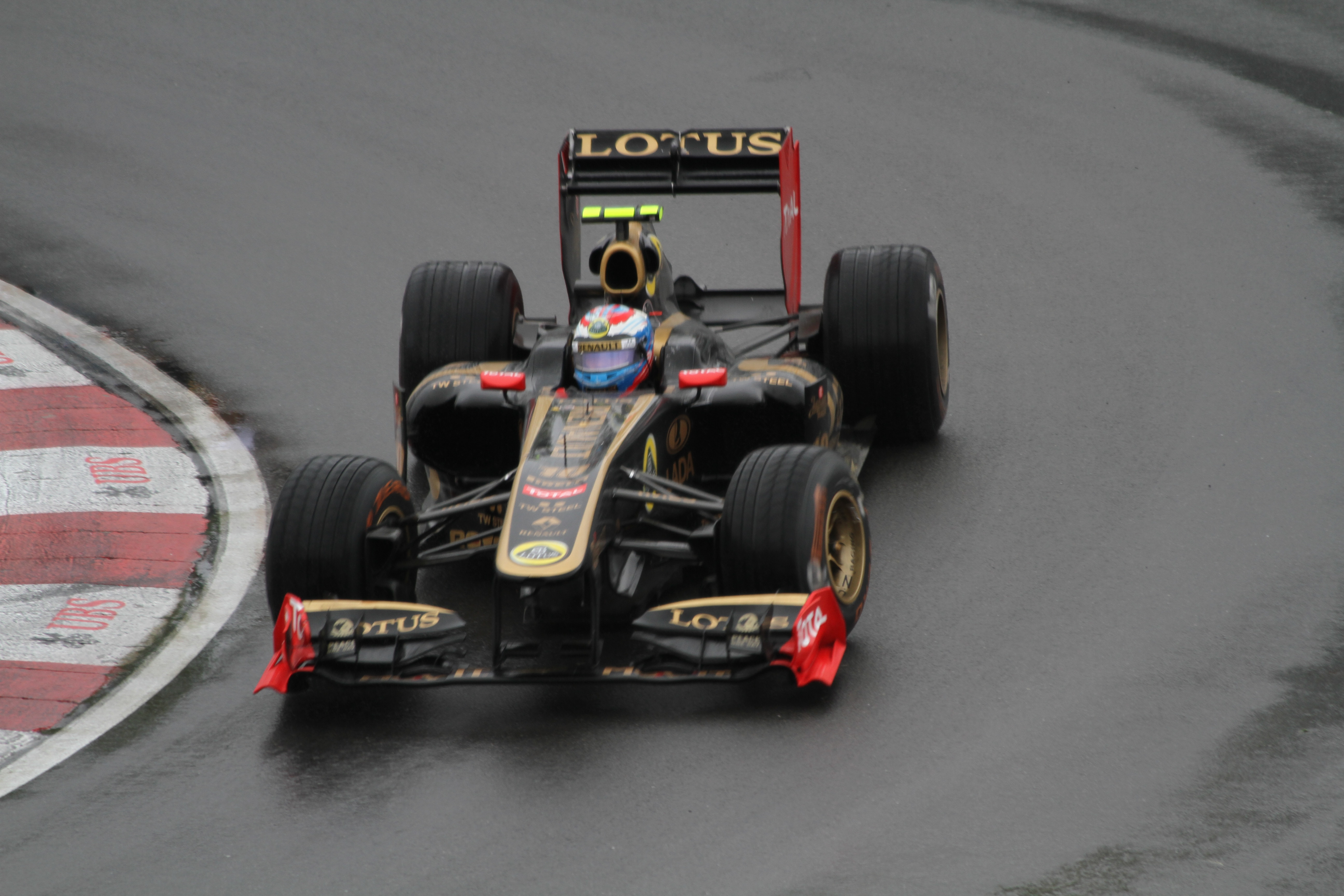
(Sepang International Circuit in Malaysia on the left, and a Formula One open-wheel car on the right).
TrackMania Nations features only one environment called Stadium, a very large competition stadium, and a single car resembling a Formula One open-wheel car.

TrackMania Nations offers only one environment, called Stadium, which is competition-oriented with technical gameplay and a single driving style that requires precision in trajectories and speed management depending on the track configuration. This environment offers a more classic graphic style for a racing game, abandoning the previous sunny worlds, landscapes, and underground settings. The action takes place in a very large competition stadium, in the style of Formula 1 circuits, featuring numerous logos and advertising panels for brands such as Nvidia and ESWC. As well as the classic asphalt, the tracks have a new surface: grass. However, the game only offers one setting in daytime, whereas the previous installments offered several. The Nations Forever expansion adds a new surface: some races take place partly or entirely on dirt. Some Nations Forever tracks sometimes feature scenery that resembles aerial tunnels or passages between partitions in buildings, similar to motocross or indoor karting races. Furthermore, the expansion allows deciding the time of day at which the race takes place, which affects the lighting and atmosphere.

The tracks range from the simplest to the fastest and most complex, with multiple levels, ramps, and numerous jumps. They feature steep slopes, banked curves, winding and unusual roads, platforms, loops, half-pipes, and blocks that suddenly accelerate the cars. Players must sometimes avoid obstacles such as holes or columns in the middle of the road. Going off the track often results in elimination, as it is rarely possible to return to the circuit.

Only one car is available. It is a type of Formula 1 single-seater resembling an Ariel Atom, with low suspension and a tendency to roll over. The car's handling differs significantly from the models offered in previous games and provides a more realistic driving experience. In the same way as in the previous game, it can reach very high speeds, up to nearly 500 mph. Each country has its own vehicle colors: fifty-three skins match the flags of different nations and are automatically applied to the cars based on the player's country of origin. Players can still customize their cars.

=== Single player and multiplayer ===
The core of TrackMania Nations is its multiplayer aspect, in which players from around the world are ranked according to their scores. It includes new online modes. Each player receives information about the ESWC qualifiers in their country directly in the game interface.

For solo play, the game offers the same Race mode as in the first installments, which is called “Training” here. However, the Puzzle, Platform, Stunt, and Survival modes from its predecessors are absent. The game includes around a hundred pre-built tracks sorted into three difficulty levels (beginner, advanced, and expert). The player can access all the single races in any order they wish. They can also complete campaigns, which are groups of races. In Nations Forever, the circuits are unlocked gradually based on the medals won in previous races. The tracks are sorted by color (white, green, blue, red, black).

Online multiplayer offers three game modes that can be played solo or in teams, with nearly seventy tracks. There is no limit to the number of players on a network or the Internet. In “Time Trial” mode, up to eight players must achieve the best time on a track within a set time limit (players can use the feature that allows them to restart the game from the last checkpoint). In “Lap” mode, players are only allowed one start, and the goal is to achieve the best time. The “Team” mode allows two teams to compete against each other.

In hotseat mode, each player must create a profile in order to play. In “Turn-based” mode, players (up to eight) compete on the same track, each taking turns on the same PC with the aim of setting the fastest time. Players have a limited number of attempts (represented on screen by a colored bar that gradually empties). In Time Trial mode, players have a certain number of attempts rather than a time limit.

The Nations Forever expansion allows multiplayer gaming in the Stadium universe with players who own United Forever, the expansion for TrackMania United. The interface and sorting of single-player tracks has been modified. Regardless of the game mode, tracks are classified by difficulty level: “beginner,” “easy,” “normal,” “difficult,” and “extreme.” Tracks are presented in a table with thumbnails showing the type of environment. They are also marked according to four criteria representing their nature: Race, Acrobatic, Endurance, and Speed.

=== Features ===
The game includes all the essential features from previous episodes. The level editor, similar to the one in the previous games, allows creating custom tracks and choosing the game modes and music. In the level editor, all blocks are immediately accessible, without the need to be unlocked. The replay editor and Mediatracker allow you to manage camera placement and create intro and outro sequences. The game does not include peer-to-peer functionality, as Nations is focused on competition. The game includes a system that allows the players to create and manage a friends list, or challenge them by email.

TrackMania Nations Forever is able to display anaglyphic stereoscopic graphics that can be viewed with 3D glasses.

== Development ==
=== Genesis ===
TrackMania Nations was developed by Nadeo, "in close collaboration with the World Cup organizers, who brought all their expertise from the competition to the video game." Development began in 2005 and lasted six months. Even though Nadeo had just released the expansion pack for the second game, Sunrise eXtreme, it announced the release of TrackMania Nations at the end of January the following year.

Florent Castelnérac first encountered the world of esports through his friend Matthieu Dallon, founder of the Electronic Sports World Cup (since renamed the Esports World Convention). He attended this event at the Futuroscope Convention Center in Poitiers, where nearly 400 players competed in games such as Counter-Strike and Quake 4. It was in 2005, during a trip to China for the Chinajoy video game trade show, that he understood the craze for this aspect of video games. Watching the Need for Speed competitions, he thought that TrackMania would be much more suited to esports than Need for Speed. The ESWC, through Matthieu Dallon, signed an agreement with Nadeo for the French company to develop and distribute a free video game for competition. As Nadeo was working on TrackMania Sunrise, around September 2004, the ESWC asked the studio to create a specific game for its competition. Nadeo was not ready to meet the demand, and Caltelnérac felt that this was also the case for the ESWC. A year later, the company returned with the concept of a customized version of the game for ESWC 2006, focused on competitive play.

In addition to the meeting with Dallon at the ESWC and his trip to China, Castelnérac points out that the move towards competition is also a logical step for a game that is designed to be multiplayer and incorporates a scoring and ranking system. He also reveals that he competed in sports during his youth. It is therefore natural for him to be drawn to competition. He sees the game less as entertainment and more as a tool for bringing nations and players together.

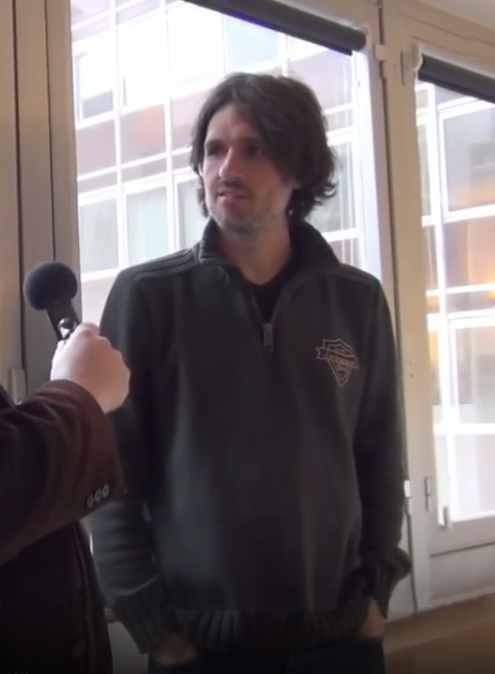
Florent Castelnérac, director of Nadeo (photo from 2013)

Nations' interest lies in promoting the game internationally, since despite its clear success in Europe, the license was relatively unknown around the world at the time, particularly in the United States.

=== Design ===
TrackMania Nations, like its predecessors, was developed by a team of only a dozen people. According to Castelnérac, although the two previous installments are more complete, Nations still has the advantage of being a game in its own right. It was primarily developed to promote online multiplayer gaming, but Nadeo decided to retain a single-player mode in order to satisfy players of all levels, as well as those who do not play online. While Nations is technologically similar to TrackMania Sunrise, the track design is completely different. The game was designed to allow players using the keyboard to go as far as possible. The choice of the multi-purpose stadium as the setting makes sense for Nadeo, which considers it a neutral cultural venue for competition. As well as the graphical improvements made since TrackMania Sunrise, the game includes numerous enhancements. According to Nadeo, the Stadium universe is the culmination of all the team's knowledge in terms of level design (in 2008). The team considers it to be a little less “crazy” than the previous installments. One of the game's main attractions is that it can be played entirely with a keyboard, so that players using gamepads don't have an advantage, which is essential for a game designed for online competition. The ladder and scoring system have been simplified to make it more accessible than in previous installments. A dedicated server can now be launched on Linux.

The focus was on revamping the visuals. Gameplay has been made more accessible, as have the graphics. The aim is to enable viewers to better understand the information on screen, the rules, and the action.

The game was released very early in 2006 and is free to play, so that all players can practice for the competition. Nadeo decided to include advertising in the game by introducing logos and other brands in various forms, such as billboards along the tracks, in order to monetize its work on the game and compensate for its free availability. Despite being free, the StarForce copy protection is integrated into the game to prevent cheating in terms of scores, particularly in competition during the ESWC. Even if there are no financial gains, for Nadeo, developing “the benchmark online racing game is priceless”. Furthermore, the team believes that the content of Nations differs from previous installments and therefore prefers to offer it for free. The aim of offering it for free is also to avoid dividing the community between those who can pay and those who cannot.

=== Development of the expansion ===
While Nations was developed in just six months, Nations Forever took over a year to complete because the team fell significantly behind schedule. Nadeo collaborated with ESWC to make a few tweaks and adjustments to Nations Forever. The expansion went through twelve intermediate versions, evolving thanks to the community and some 600 beta testers.

In order to distribute the pair of 3D glasses to players who obtained the expansion via download, Focus Home Interactive initially planned to do the same as for the stickers in the series, sending them by mail in exchange for a pre-stamped envelope sent by those wishing to obtain them. The process proved too time-consuming, however, so Focus opted to publish a magazine (at the end of May 2008) entitled TrackMania, the official magazine. This magazine is dedicated to the series, featuring articles, interviews, and reports, and also offers a pair of glasses, a physical version of the game, and various content on a DVD.

== Music ==
The music for Nations and Nations Forever was composed by French artist DOO.

== Marketing and expansion ==
Florent Castelnérac announced on several official forums that Nadeo would be revealing important news about the TrackMania franchise at the end of November 2005. Gradually, Nadeo and Focus began to leak details about the title TrackMania Nations. The concept of the free standalone game intended for the ESWC is unveiled on December 1, 2005. The release is announced for January 2006. TrackMania Nations is released on PC as a free download on January 27, 2006. CyberLeagues license holders had access to the game the week before its release. Afterwards, Nadeo released a few patches for Nations, mainly to ensure compatibility with Windows XP and Vista (version 1.8.0).

Nations is also widely distributed by the specialist press, which offers the game and all kinds of content on CDs or DVDs included with their publications. A CD bundle containing a version of the game called TrackMania Nations: Special Edition and the game Spell Force 2 is sold in particular in certain Leadtek graphics card boxes.

At ESWC 2006, a new game in the series entitled TrackMania United was unveiled sine die. It was to bring together all the environments created up to that point. The release of a new version of TrackMania Nations was also announced. Several new features were already known, such as new blocks and a new rating system for tracks created by players. The expansion was unveiled in detail on April 4, 2008. TrackMania Nations Forever, the standalone expansion for TrackMania Nations, was released on April 16, 2008, for PC (Windows) as a free download. This publication follows the release the day before, on April 15, 2008, of the TrackMania United Forever expansion pack for the game United. Both expansion packs allow users of both games to connect to the same online game servers in the Stadium universe. As well as the new features already announced, the expansion pack offers a single-player mode with sixty-five new tracks in a new and improved version of the Stadium universe. It also includes the option, as in Sunrise, to choose the time of day when the race takes place. This choice affects the lighting and atmosphere. All players must create a new account to access the game. Starting in June 2008, Nadeo released a patch for TrackMania Nations Forever, which was followed by numerous other patches.

Nations Forever was also released on Steam on April 16, 2008. This version does not include StarForce protection.

The boxed version of Nations Forever includes a pair of 3D glasses. In order to meet the expectations of players who obtained the expansion via download, Focus Home Interactive, in association with publisher Future, published a magazine titled TrackMania, the official magazine, in France on May 28, 2008. It is dedicated to the series with features, interviews, reports, and also offers a pair of glasses and a boxed version of the game on DVD.

Castelnérac stated in the summer of 2008 that despite offering the game for free, Nadeo's business remained profitable, particularly thanks to the small size of the company. Furthermore, Nadeo has implemented an in-game advertising system. Brands could purchase advertising space, which allowed Nadeo to generate revenue through the game. Upon its initial release, the game featured numerous logos and billboards for brands such as Nvidia and ESWC. In 2006, IGA Worldwide signed an agreement with Nadeo to introduce advertising into the game. Cossette Montreal signed an agreement allowing Bell Sympatico to display advertisements. On October 31, 2007, IGA Worldwide signed a new agreement allowing the introduction of advertising in TrackMania Nations Forever for three years.

TrackMania T-shirts were marketed in 2008 by the company Himmersion.

== Reception ==
=== Reviews ===
Score summary
Print media
Media	Nations
Hardcore Gamer (US)	5/5
Giochi per il mio computer (IT)	5/5
Digital media
Media	Nations
digit (IN)	8/10
Factornews (FR)	8/10
JeuxVideoPC.com (FR)	17/20

TrackMania Nations was generally well-received by the specialized press upon its release.

According to PC Open, the gameplay is “easy” to learn. Eurogamer notes that while the gameplay may not be as fast-paced as its predecessor, it is more technical. PC Open believes that Nations fulfills its intended purpose very well, namely competitive gaming. For Giochi per il mio computer, it might seem frustrating at first, but its addictive nature takes over and pushes players to constantly improve their performance. Digit magazine says it's pretty hard, even on medium difficulty. JeuxVideoPC.com calls it “super fun”. and says the level editor is easy to use. The magazine regrets the absence of certain modes present in previous games, such as Puzzle mode. According to Hardcore Gamer, the absence of collisions ultimately pushes players to fight against the track rather than their competitors in multiplayer mode. This is a feeling that is also echoed by digit magazine. JeuxVideoPC.com considers the absence of collisions to be regrettable. According to Giochi per il mio computer, players unfamiliar with the series may encounter some difficulties with the features offered by the developers.

digit considers the graphics to be “magnificent”. JeuxVideoPC.com finds them to be high quality and not requiring a powerful configuration. PC Open believes that the game has the advantage of running on most configurations, with varying levels of detail. Giochi per il mio computer considers the “textures clean and convincing”. Hardcore Gamer notes that the graphics are not outdated like many free games and are on par with competing productions at the time (2006).

Hardcore Gamer considers the single-player mode to be just a “warm-up,” while the online mode offers the full gaming experience. digit expects the multiplayer mode to be disappointing due to the small size of the game (an executable file of only 265 MB). Nevertheless, the magazine was won over by an “incredible” experience and a game with fast servers and no lag. However, it regrets that the names of the tracks are not more evocative of what they are. JeuxVideoPC.com notes that it is sometimes impossible to differentiate between official and unofficial servers. Giochi per il mio computer describes the hotseat mode as “spectacular”.

digit reveals that players have dubbed the game “The Crashday Killer” (because none of them have time to play it when there is money to be made on Nations). Eurogamer considers that Nadeo can be forgiven for introducing advertisements, given that the company offers free content to players.

According to PC Open, the background music in the menus helps to create a pause effect between the fast-paced phases of gameplay. According to the magazine, the sound effects are well done, especially the roaring engines and the sound of vehicles passing over acceleration blocks. However, JeuxVideoPC.com considers the car sound effects to be “average” and regrets that the music cannot be turned off in the game and that players are forced to go through the launcher to do so.

According to Hardcore Gamer and digit, Nations is one of the best racing games released in the years leading up to its release (2006). According to JeuxVideoPC.com, Nadeo continues to excel. Edge describes it as a “free game with superb finishing touches”. For Giochi per il mio computer, Nations is a gaming experience that every player should try at least once.

Score summary
Print media
Media	Nations Forever
Canard PC (FR)	9/10
Hardcore Gamer (US)	4/5
Digital media
Media	Nations Forever
Eurogamer (UK)	9/10
GamesPlanet (AU)	9/10

TrackMania Nations Forever was generally well received by the specialized press upon its release.

For the Italian edition of The Games Machine magazine, the ability to compete online with players who have TrackMania United is a welcome development. According to Hardcore Gamer, the car's uncontrollable bouncing after poor landings can be frustrating, but the excessive jumps are still enjoyable. Giochi per il mio computer considers the update “excellent” and recommends the game to its readers. According to GamesPlanet, the game is a “fantastic step forward” compared to its predecessor released two years earlier. It describes it as “incredibly addictive, brimming with competition and adrenaline,“ and believes that the spirit of Nations has been preserved and even improved. The site notes smoother graphics and more detailed vehicles, and notes with interest the improvement of the checkpoint system. For the site, the addition of the 3D graphics display feature is ”useful". Canard PC congratulates Nadeo on this new version of its game and its free availability. The magazine considers that the driving is on a par with the finesse of games such as F-Zero and WipeOut, and considers it to be the best game of the moment (2006) in the arcade racing game genre.

The number of downloads and accounts continued to grow, reaching several million a few years later. Based on data from Focus and Nadeo, during the first weekend after release, 200,000 French-speaking users downloaded the game, and the online game servers recorded peak connections of 8,000 people simultaneously on Saturday, March 29, 2006, which caused some slowdowns. On January 30, 2006, Nadeo announced the creation of new servers to allow all players to play online and train “in the best conditions”. By February 25, 2006, there were 400,000 registered players. By the end of March 2006, 600,000 players were listed in the game's international online rankings. Focus and Nadeo recorded a total of 6 million downloads of the game and observed nearly 10,000 people connected to the servers at any given time. Both French companies also noted the arrival of 100,000 new players each week. In April 2007, Hardcore Gamer magazine reported that 500,000 tracks had been created by fans. On October 22, 2007, there were 3,398,745 registered players. In early April 2008, Nadeo and Focus announced 30 million game installations and 4 million account creations. In early July 2008, the number of new players starting to play TrackMania each day reached 15,000. TrackMania Nations had a total of approximately 12 million registered users at the end of 2012.

In February 2006, Florent Castelnérac revealed that the release of Nations and its discovery by the general public had boosted sales of the previous TrackMania games available in stores at that time.

== Legacy ==
=== Esports ===
==== Various amateur and professional competitions ====
In competition, TrackMania is unique in that it requires players to be constantly adaptable and responsive, since although the concept of a collision-free arcade racing game remains largely the same, the maps and races differ in each competition. In contrast, a game like Counter-Strike has offered only the same maps for years.

Like previous games in the series, TrackMania Nations is played in various LAN parties as well as in numerous competitions. For example, a LAN party is taking place in Mont-de-Marsan in mid-February 2006. The Fnac Trophy is taking place in all of the brand's stores in partnership with the ESWC in mid-April 2006. Winners qualify for this competition, which takes place at the end of June 2006. The Spring Cup online competition, running from March 1 to May 11, 2006, also includes Nations games. The Argenteuil Digitale competition, which takes place at the end of February 2007, is a qualifier for the 2007 ESWC. In late January 2009, a LAN Game in Chelles hosting Nations Forever took place in Chelles. In late May 2009, Nations Forever was played in competition during the final of the French Video Game Cup. Nations Forever was also one of the games in competition during the 5th French University Video Game Championship, which took place in 2013. A LAN party was held in mid-December 2016 in Saint-Étienne-du-Rouvray, with Nations Forever among the list of games.

Nations and Nations Forever are also played in various tournaments such as the World Cyber Games and ESL.

=== Electronic Sports World Cup ===
To participate in the Electronic Sports World Cup, players must compete in one or more qualifying competitions approved by the ESWC organization and held in their respective countries among the fifty participating nations. These competitions determine the player(s) representing each nation at the ESWC.

TrackMania Nations is one of the official games of the 2006 Electronic Sports World Cup, alongside Counter-Strike 1.6, Quake 4, WarCraft III: The Frozen Throne, Gran Turismo 4, and Pro Evolution Soccer 5. The competition took place from June 28 to July 2 in France, at the Palais Omnisports de Paris-Bercy. The cash prize of $40,000 was awarded to the winner of the TrackMania Nations competition. The competition was won by the French player competing under the pseudonym Carl. The following year, Nations was among the games competing in the 2007 ESWC, held at the Paris Expo Porte de Versailles in France from July 5 to 8, 2007, alongside Counter-Strike 1.6, WarCraft III: The Frozen Throne, Quake 4, and Pro Evolution Soccer 6. The total prize money for all games was $20,000. The competition was won by the Dutch player competing under the pseudonym Xenogear. He won the $10,000 prize, while the runners-up, French players Carl and Lign, won $6,000 and $3,000 respectively.

At the 2008 ESWC, held from August 25 to 27, 2008, at the San Jose Convention Center in the United States, Nations Forever was included in the list of games in competition. The competition also featured Counter-Strike 1.6, Defense of the Ancients, WarCraft III: The Frozen Throne, and Quake III Arena. The Swedish player nicknamed FrostBeule won the competition and took home $12,000.

Nations Forever was included in the list of games for the 2009 ESWC alongside Counter-Strike 1.6, Quake III Arena, and WarCraft III: The Frozen Throne. Qualifications began in each country in October 2009. Unfortunately, Games-Services, the French company organizing the event, faced significant financial difficulties, leading to its liquidation at the end of March 2009. Although a few qualifying tournaments were played, the 2009 edition of the ESWC was canceled. The brand was then bought out in early August 2009 and the event was relaunched in 2010.

Nations Forever is one of the games competing in the 2010 ESWC, which takes place from June 30 to July 4, 2010, at Disneyland Paris in Marne-la-Vallée, France. The total prize money awarded was $213,500 across all games, including Counter Strike, WarCraft III: The Frozen Throne,Guitar Hero 5, and FIFA 10. The Norwegian player known as Bergie won the competition and took home $8,000. The 2011 edition of the ESWC, which took place from October 21 to 25, 2011, at Paris Expo during Paris Games Week, included Nations Forever as well as games such as StarCraft II: Wings of Liberty, Counter-Strike 1.6, Dota 2, and FIFA 11. A total of $200,000 in prize money is distributed throughout the competition. The Croatian player known by the pseudonym hakkiJunior wins the tournament and takes home $8,000. In 2012, Nations Forever was one of the games competing in the ESWC. That year, the international qualifying phase ran from July to October 2012, and the final took place from October 31 to November 4, organized for the second consecutive year during Paris Games Week. The “very impressive” Dutch player known by the pseudonym Spam, whose consistency meant he did not lose a single round throughout the competition, won the gold medal. The 2012 ESWC was the last appearance for Nations and Nations Forever. That year saw the arrival of TrackMania²: Canyon, which also competed and took up the torch from TrackMania at the ESWC for the next few years with TrackMania²: Stadium. On the last day of the competition, November 4, 2012, the ESWC Kids (the world cup of video games for children) also took place on Nations Forever.

TrackMania Nations / Nations Forever – ESWC podiums
Edition / Ranking	1st	2nd	3rd	4th place
2006 – Nations	Carl	Baiy000r	gaLLo	Dridione
2007 – Nations	XeNoGeaR	Carl	Lign	Selrahc
2008 – Nations Forever	Frostbeule	XeNoGeaR	Lign	Carl
2009 – Tournament cancelled	—	—	—	—
2010 – Nations Forever	Bergie	Moriah	YoYo	Carl
2011 – Nations Forever	hakkiJunior	tween	YoYo	Spam
2012 – Nations Forever	Spam	Tween	Carl Jr	Ned

=== Impact ===
Since the release of Nations, TrackMania has become a “benchmark in the genre” of eSports according to JeuxVideoPC and the favorite game of fans of the genre according to GamesPlanet. Joystick magazine cites January 2006 as a key date in the series, when Nations “exploded [into the eyes] of the general public,” and estimates that it has carved out a place for itself in the “very closed circle” of esports in just two years. Although the franchise never really took off in the United States, TrackMania Nations was played in numerous competitions, both amateur and professional. Nadeo's public relations team promoted this aspect, offering direct in-game promotion to high-level tournaments and teams. Nadeo is also present among players at gatherings and LAN parties such as the Gamers Assembly.

The TrackMania franchise is listed in the Guinness Book of World Records: Gamer's Edition 2008. Nations holds the record for the largest number of players connected online during the same game, with 132 people. It also holds the record for the first free game to be specially developed for online competition, the record for the most popular online racing game with 3,398,745 registered players as of October 22, 2007, and the record for the largest number of nationalities participating in an offline racing competition, namely 34. TrackMania has set other records, such as the most popular video created by a player, thanks to 1K Project II, viewed more than two million times on the GameTrailers website, and the largest database for a racing game (largest amount of content for a racing game), thanks to the TrackMania-Exchange (176,506 tracks) and TrackMania Car-Park (228 cars) websites. Nations holds the record for the largest online race, until it was broken in early July 2008 by Nations Forever. and TrackMania Car-Park (228 cars). Nations held the record for the largest online race until it was broken in early July 2008 by Nations Forever (record validated by the Guinness Book of World Records). This version of the game allowed 250 players to connect online on the same track.

In July 2015, PC Magazine included TrackMania Nations Forever in its list of the best free PC games. Maximum PC and Windows: Help & Advice ranked it in their list of the twenty best free PC games in December 2015.

In 2016, members of the TrackMania community created a video featuring 20,000 cars at the same time. The replays of these players were recorded on TrackMania Nations Forever and TrackMania United Forever, then converted and compiled in TrackMania² Stadium.

== Remake ==
On February 28, 2020, Ubisoft announced the release of a remake of Nations called TrackMania. It was released on July 1, 2020 for Microsoft Windows. The game features a variety of tracks, official seasonal campaigns, daily selections of community-created tracks, and new surfaces and special blocks. The game also includes esports modes for daily competitions and international leagues.
