= TrackMania United =

2006 video game

- Developer: Nadeo
- Publishers: FRA: Focus Home Interactive; UK: Deep Silver; NA: Enlight
- Director: Florent Castelnérac
- Series: TrackMania
- Platform: Windows
- Release: FR: November 17, 2006; RU: December 22, 2006; GER: February 23, 2007; EU: March 9, 2007; WW: March 23, 2007; NA: June 11, 2007
- Genre: Racing
- Modes: Single-player, multiplayer

TrackMania United is a racing video game developed by Nadeo and published by Focus Home Interactive for Windows. The sequel to TrackMania Nations, it amalgamates all previous TrackMania games into a single game that includes all the environments from the earlier games, and subsequently future installments of the series. At the time of its release, the game offered a different approach compared to previous games, with its arcade-style gameplay, level editor, level sharing system, and multiplayer mode.

United generally received a warm welcome from the specialist press upon its release, even though most observers considered the game to be a compilation of previous universes with too few new features. Two expansions, TrackMania United Forever and TrackMania Nations Forever, were released in 2008 which allowed players to play both games together in multiplayer mode.

== Gameplay ==
=== General ===
TrackMania United is a third-person racing video game. At times, the camera angle shifts briefly to a first-person view or a much wider panoramic view. This game uses the same gameplay system as previous titles, with non-adjustable cars and the same vehicle control system, operated using just four buttons (accelerator, brake, steering). When jumping, players can use the brake or accelerator to influence the depth of the trajectory, as well as the steering just before a jump to achieve slight rotations. Players must achieve the best time and reach the finish line by passing through a certain number of checkpoints. Depending on the race times achieved, the player can win gold, silver, and bronze medals. Artificial intelligence controls some of the opponents, specifically the three fastest racers, who serve as benchmarks for the medals. Two buttons also allow the race to be restarted at any time, either from the start or from the last checkpoint. TrackMania's concept requires a great deal of trial and error in order to discover and master the particularities of each track. United can be played using the keyboard or a gamepad.

TrackMania United brings together the environments featured in the previous games in the series: TrackMania, TrackMania Sunrise, and TrackMania Nations. The studio's aim is to bring together all the online and solo players scattered across the other games in a single game. This is where the title United comes from. The optimized game engine displays improved graphics compared to Nations. In particular, the Stadium universe has been redesigned and now features more realistic visuals. The game includes a new shadow calculation system that launches before the start of each race to improve rendering. The game offers a few new building blocks for tracks, as well as for scenery (water, sand dunes, etc.). For example, a "Freewheel" ground block cuts the car's engine and lets it coast until it eventually passes over another block that reactivates the engine.

United requires the creation of an account in order to manage all multiplayer aspects and rankings. It uses the same friends list system that appeared in the previous game in the series.

=== Contributions to the basic concept ===
There are no new features in terms of gameplay, but there are three new features designed to strengthen community involvement and interconnection: ManiaZone, copper management, and ManiaLink.

Official mode allows players to choose which race to count, usually their best time. They can practice on a track, but their best time is not automatically recorded. The first attempt is free, but subsequent attempts must be paid for with coppers (except for the first attempt on each track, which remains free). Players should use this official mode when they feel ready to achieve their best race, as in competition. The game is inspired by sports competitions in which participants must achieve results within a given time frame. This new feature adds a certain amount of pressure to players, who can no longer afford to make mistakes during their "official" laps. It is possible to download the races of the best players (or any other ranked player) to compete against the corresponding ghost car. Players can now download replays players to study their races and driving.

The ManiaZone is a zone system combining regionalization and online ranking. It places each player in a geographical zone based on their results. Beginner players therefore start at a level corresponding to their city. As they progress, they can compete against players in their county, then their region, their country, and finally players from around the world. This means the game level adapts to the player's skill. There's a separate ranking for each category. The system also takes into account other groups, like coworkers, friends, etc., who have their own specific ranking. Therefore, servers are no longer sorted by country alone, but by city, county, region, or country. Furthermore, each circuit still has its own specific ranking. The game allows players to organize tournaments or competitions within the game. It is also possible to create a team or club. ManiaZone's system applies to multiplayer mode. To progress in the solo rankings, players must earn skill points by achieving good times in official mode. The points earned vary depending on the ranking and the number of potential opponents. Every environment and game mode has its own ranking. In multiplayer mode, a completely independent system manages the rankings: ladder points. This system, which takes into account the player's progress, awards points to a player based on their results and the level of their opponents.

Coppers, the virtual currency in the game, are undergoing a major evolution. They were previously used only to unlock building blocks in the game editor. Since then, they have been used to purchase ghosts, tracks, new vehicle models created by players, and the right to improve times in the rankings. Coppers cannot be converted into real money. and cannot be purchased with real money. They can be obtained by completing challenges in single-player mode and earning medals, by logging into the game regularly, and by sharing and selling your creations. Players who own other versions of the games in the series have an advantage and earn a few extra coppers.

ManiaLink is a peer-to-peer online platform within the game that provides links to tracks, replays, music, cars, and videos for download, hosted by Nadeo on a personal page that each player can create. A user interface, similar to a web page in a web browser such as Internet Explorer or Firefox, provides access to officially published ManiaLinks. Each player's information is stored in an XML file that centralizes the player's personal information. Items can be sold or purchased in coppers. ManiaLink also allows players to stay informed and connected with the community through a messaging system, for example about competitions or game information.

=== Environment ===
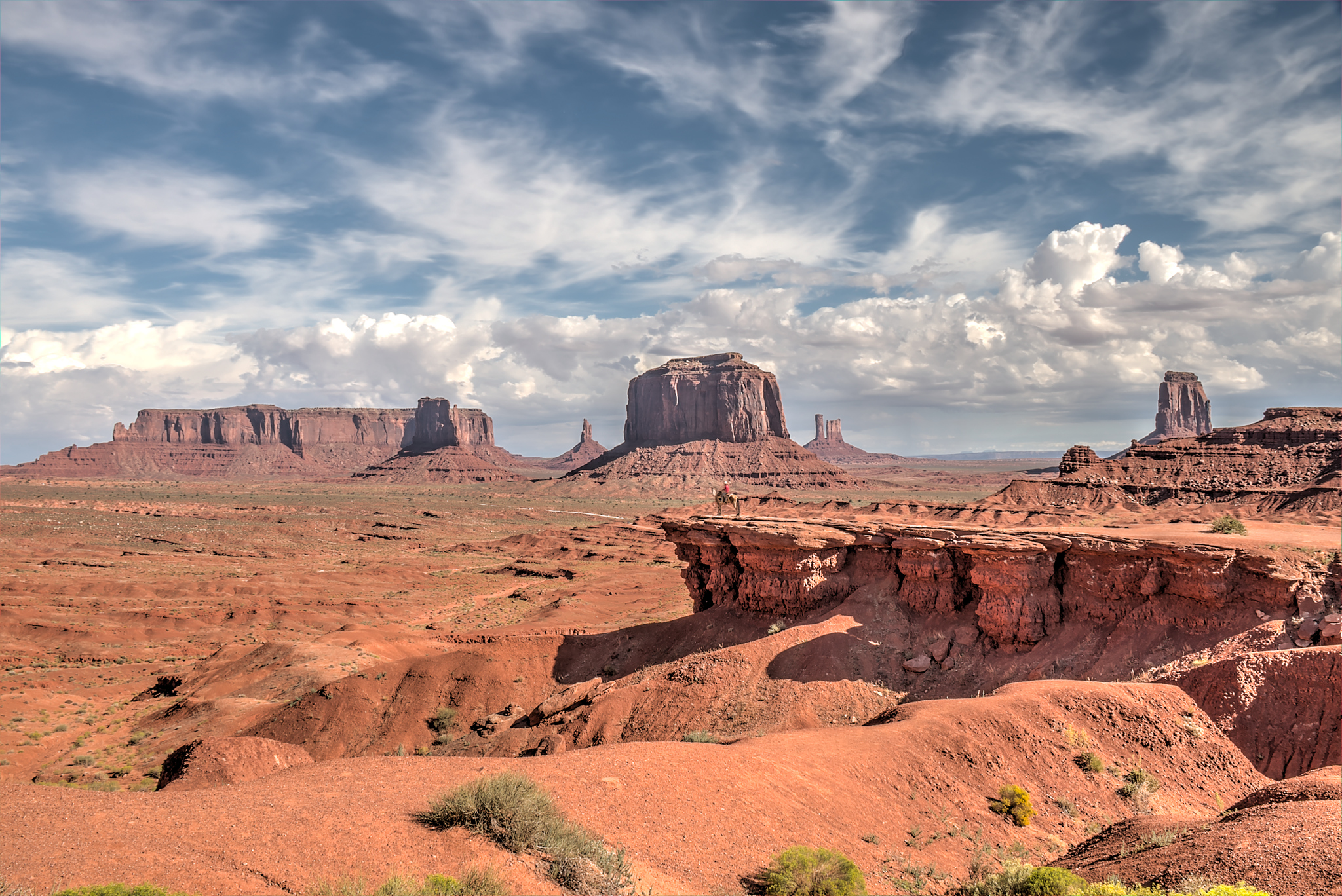
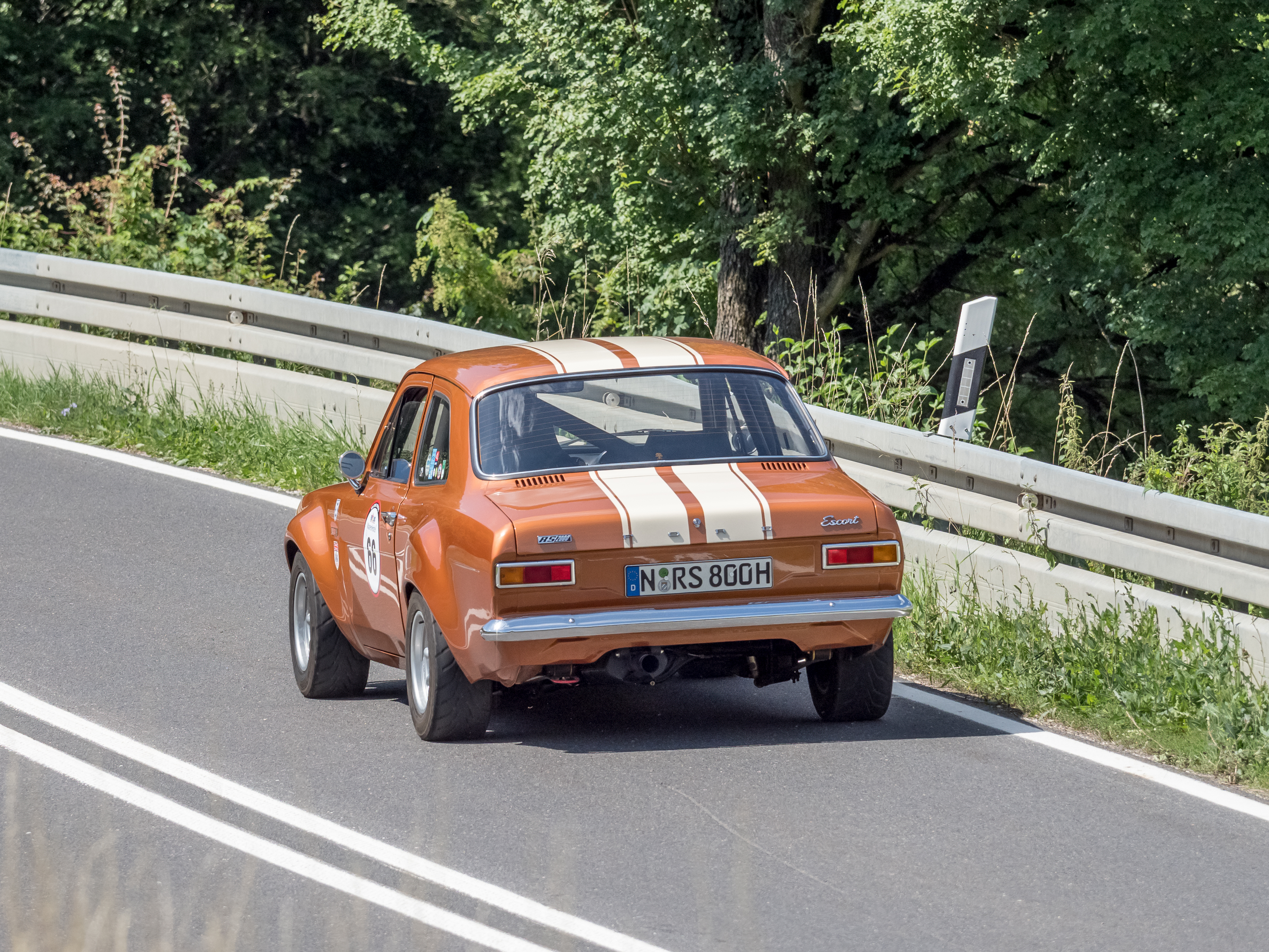
(Panorama of Monument Valley on the left, and Ford Escort RS 2000 on the right).
The environment called Desert features an American muscle car-style vehicle resembling a Ford Escort, very fast but difficult to handle.

TrackMania United includes the seven environments created to date by Nadeo and featured in previous games in the series: TrackMania, TrackMania Sunrise, and TrackMania Nations.

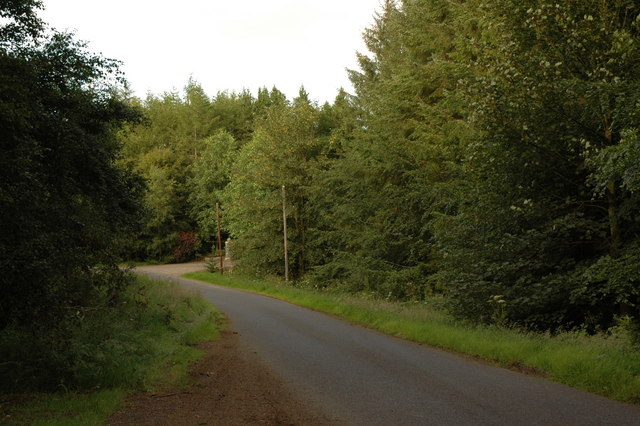
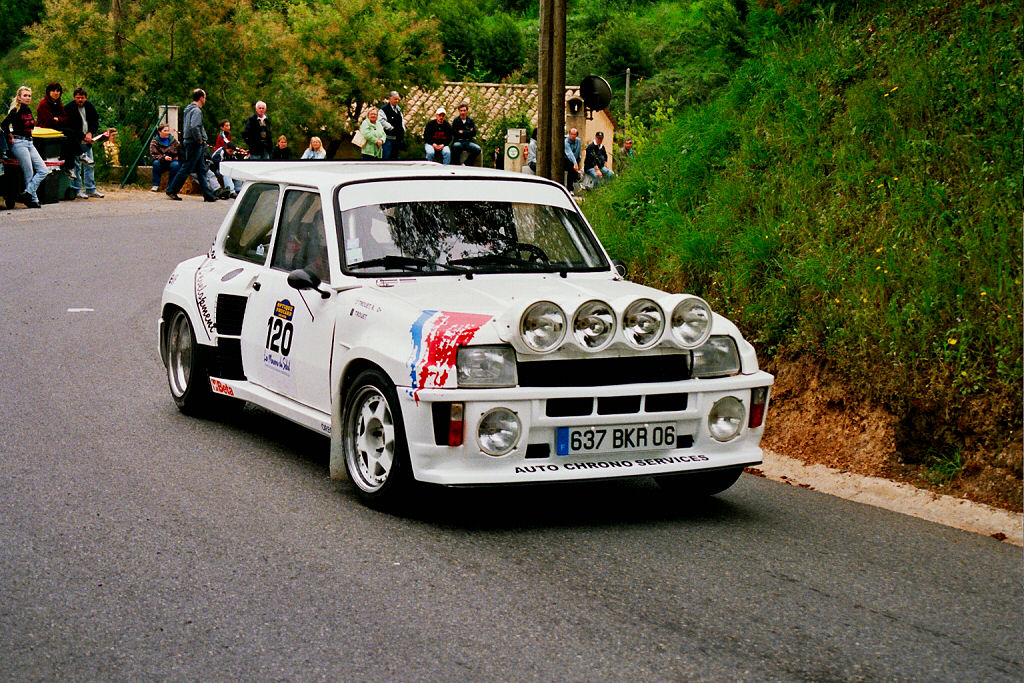
(Forest road on the left, and Renault 5 Turbo on the right).
The Rally environment offers a nimble small car resembling a Renault 5 Turbo.

Each environment, with its unique visuals and atmosphere, offers only one car with specific handling characteristics. Races can take place at different times of the day, resulting in differences in atmosphere and lighting.

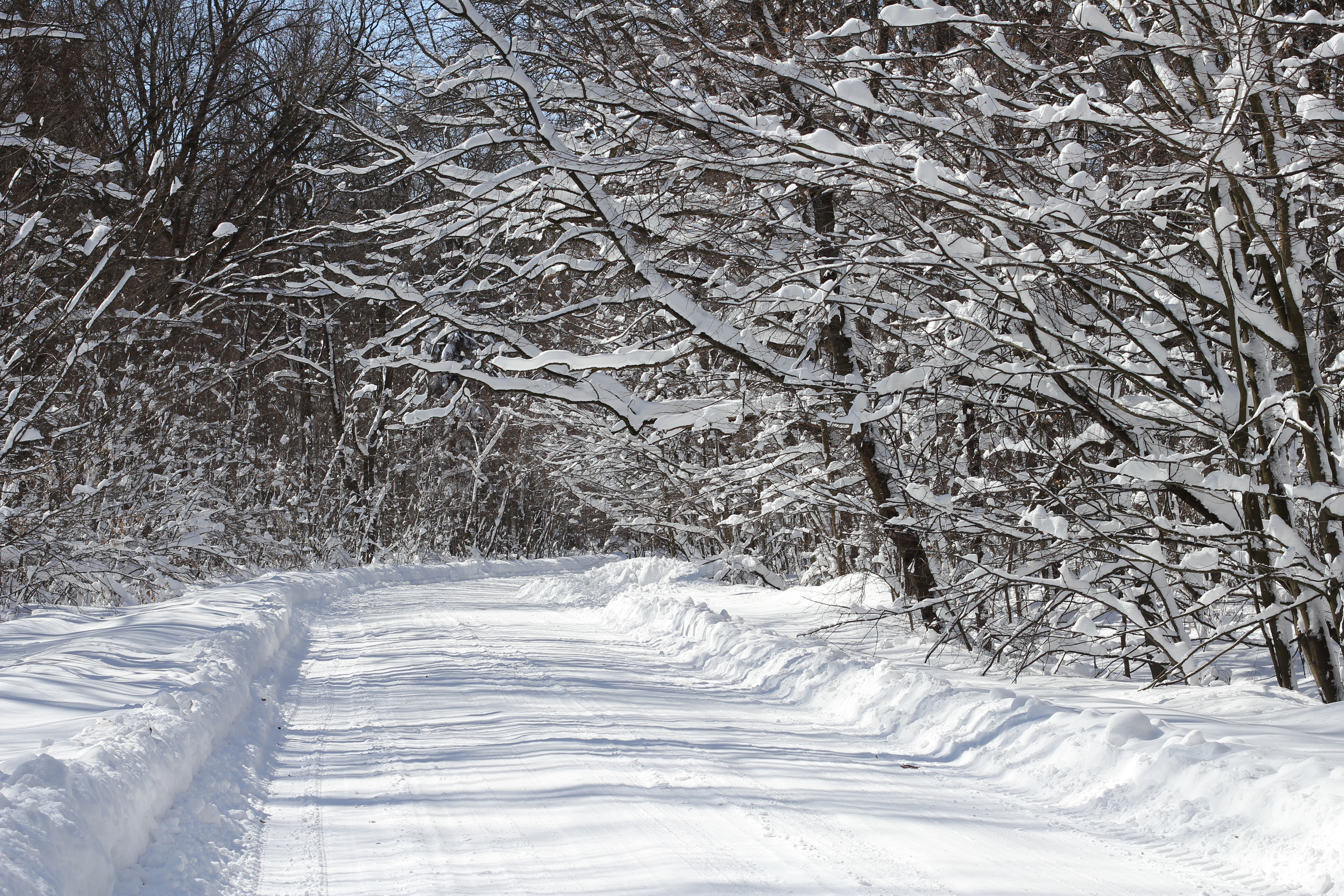
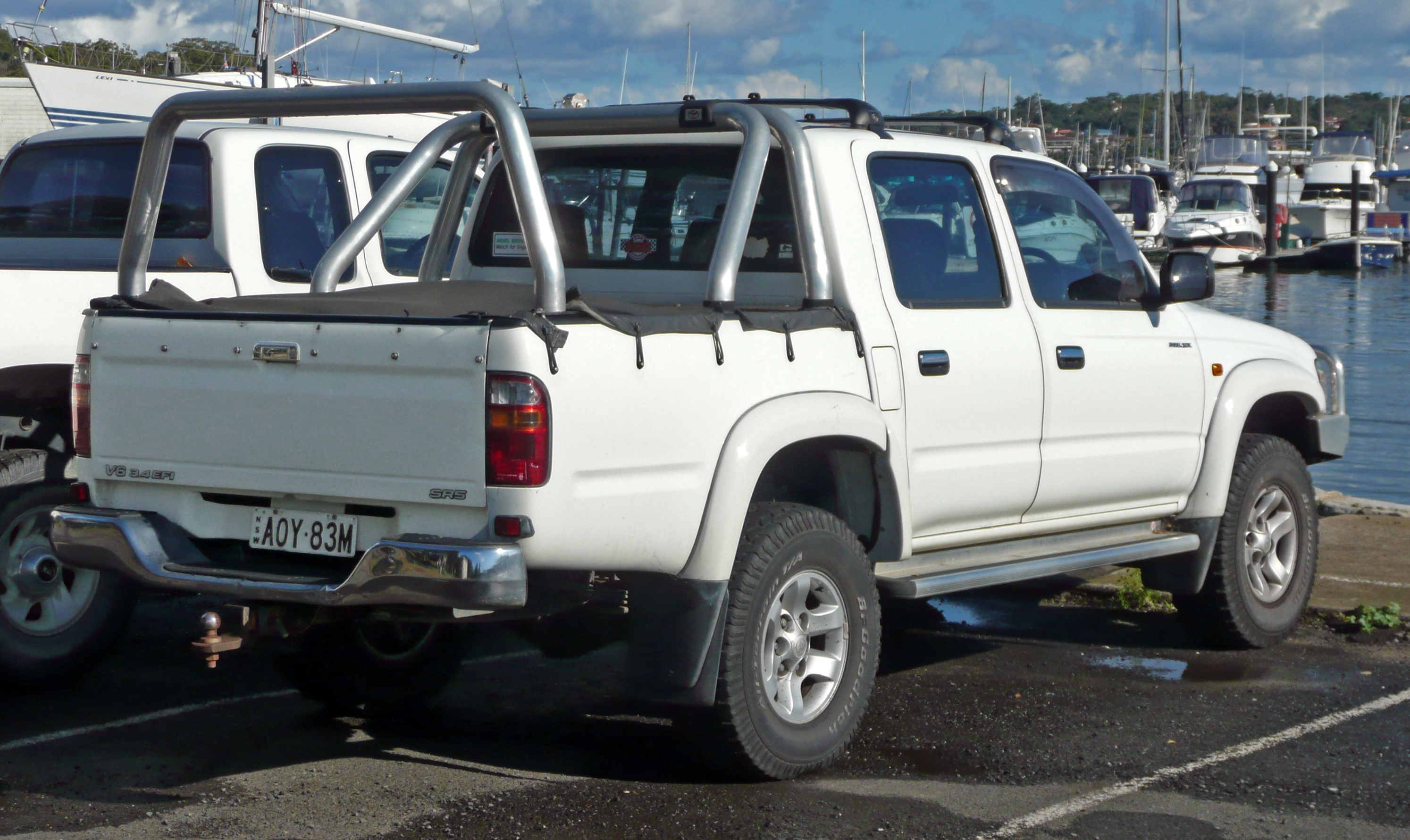
(Snowy road on the left, and Toyota pickup truck on the right).
The environment called Snow features snowy roads and elevated wooden tracks, with a very slow but highly maneuverable pickup truck.

The tracks are unusual and feature, for example, banked curves, turns, loops, obstacles, acceleration boosters, and ramps for performing huge jumps.

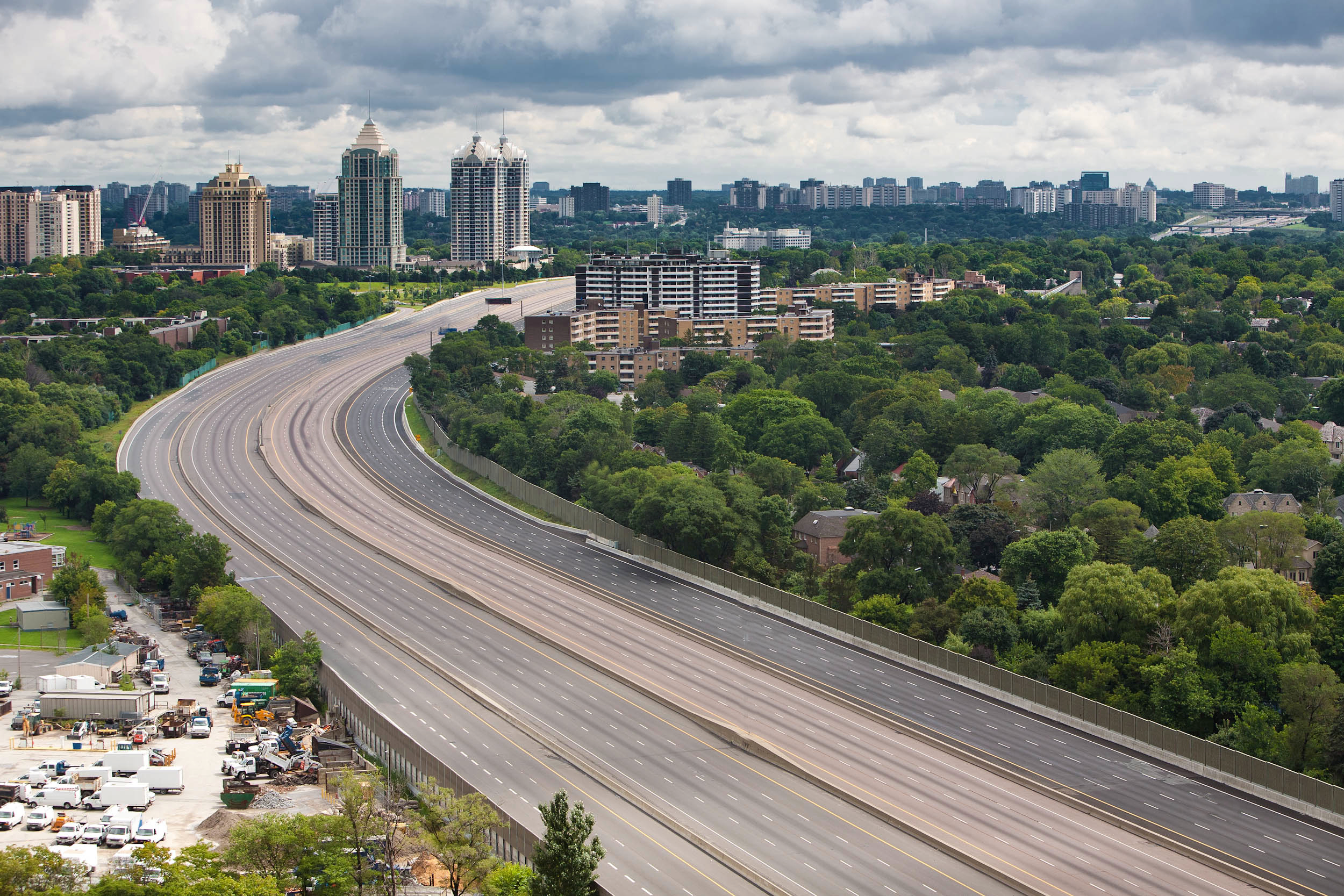
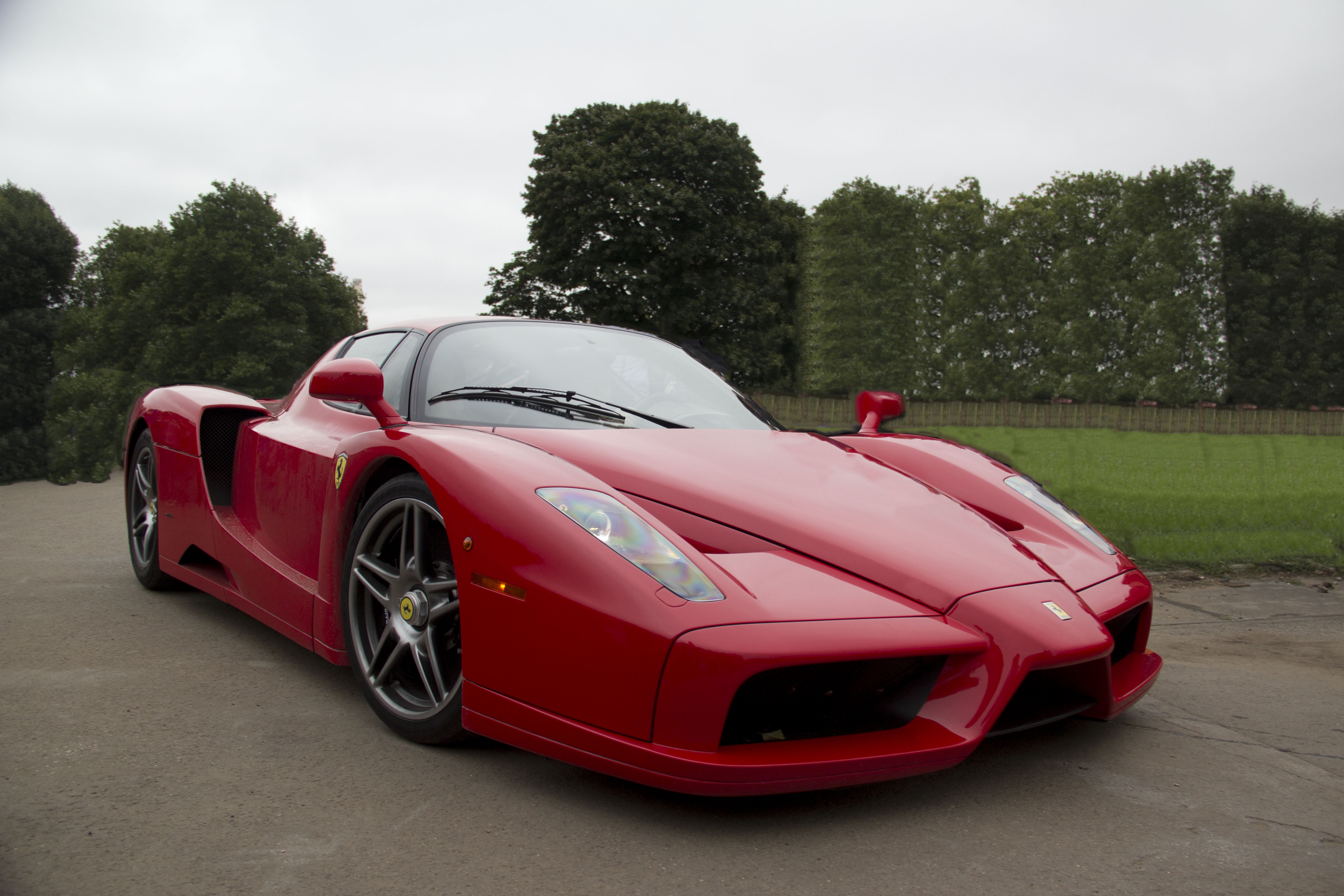
(Highway 401 (Ontario) in Ontario on the left, and Ferrari Enzo on the right).
The Island environment places the player on very wide and very fast coastal highways, driving a powerful supercar.

The "Desert," "Rally," and "Snow" environments are from the first game in the series: TrackMania. "Desert" is the first environment ever created by Nadeo.

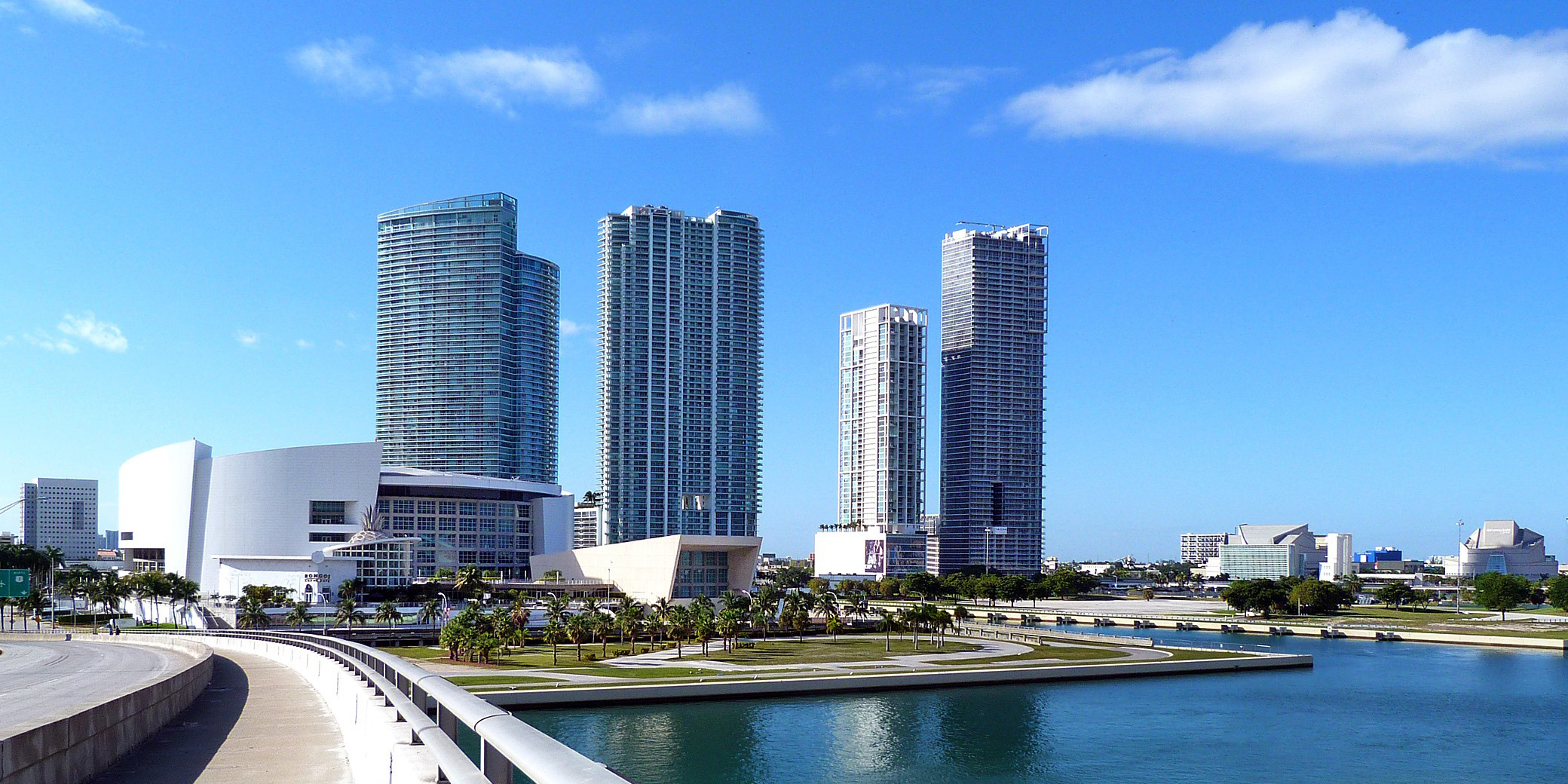
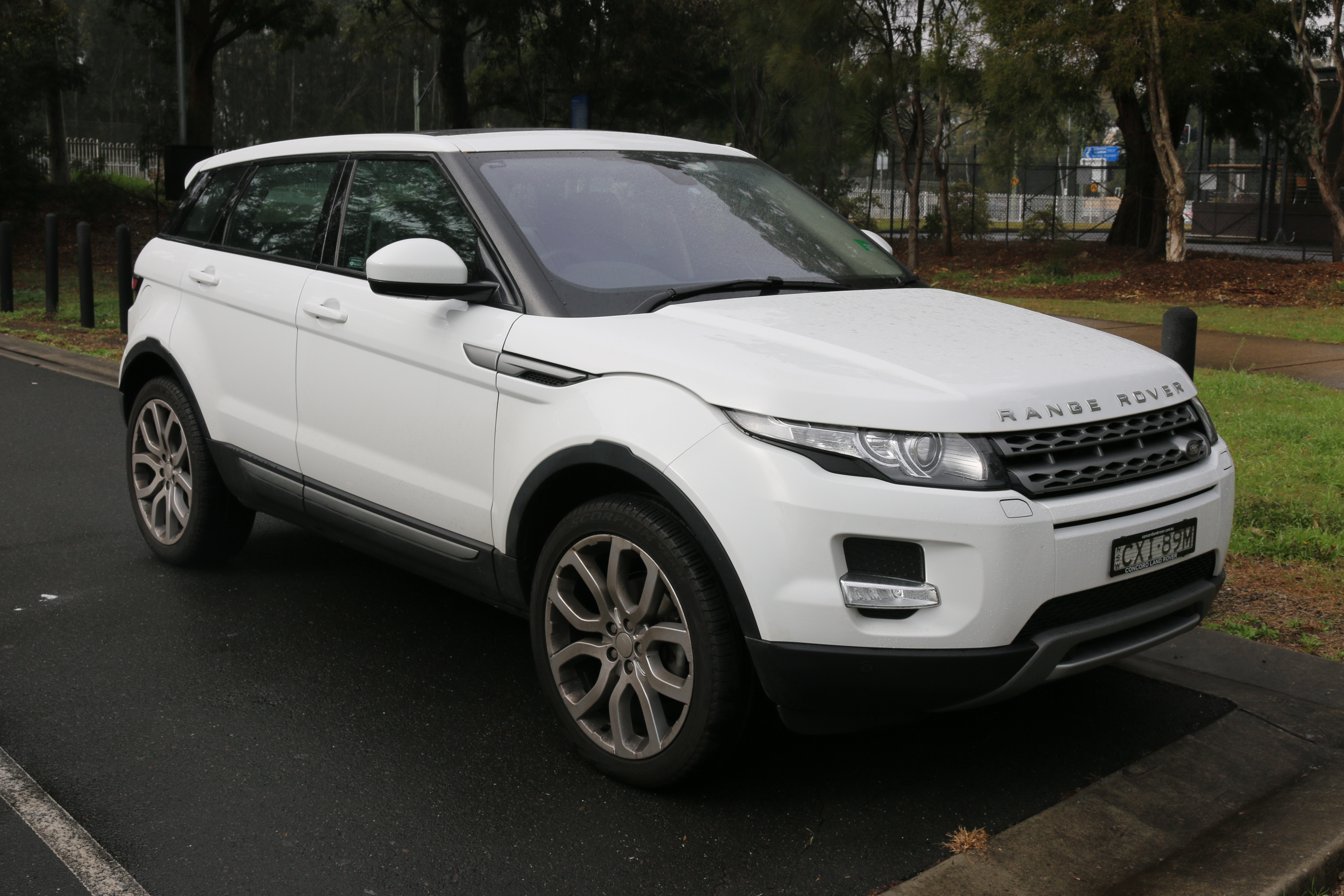
(Miami on the left, and Land Rover Range Rover Evoque 4x4 on the right).
The Bay environment offers very urban visuals, with the player driving a 4x4 vehicle.

Characterized as colorful and sunny, it puts the player behind the wheel of an American car with good brakes but limited handling, and a very soft suspension that regularly lifts it onto two wheels when cornering. It allows for high-speed cornering, huge jumps, and changes of pace.

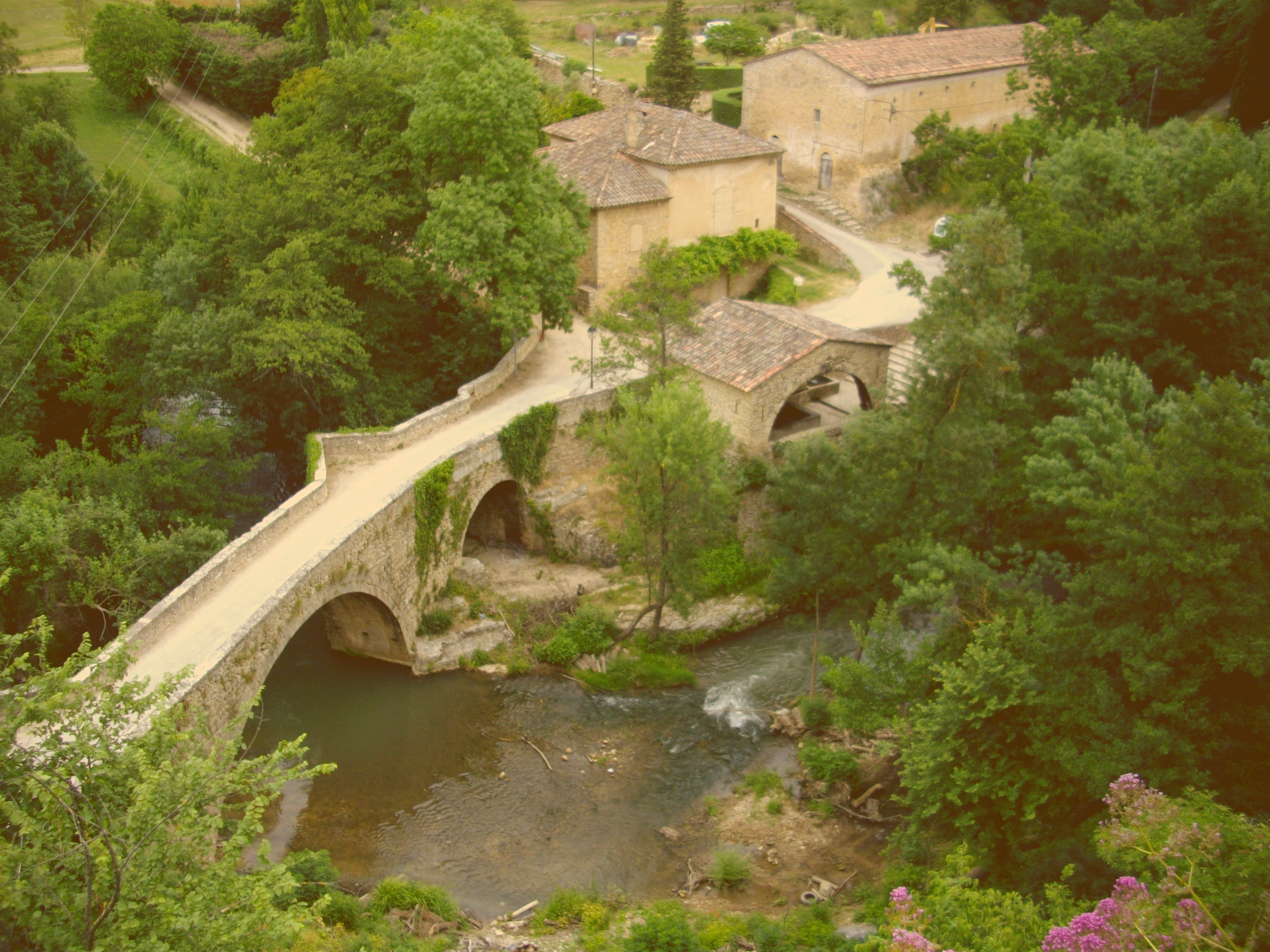
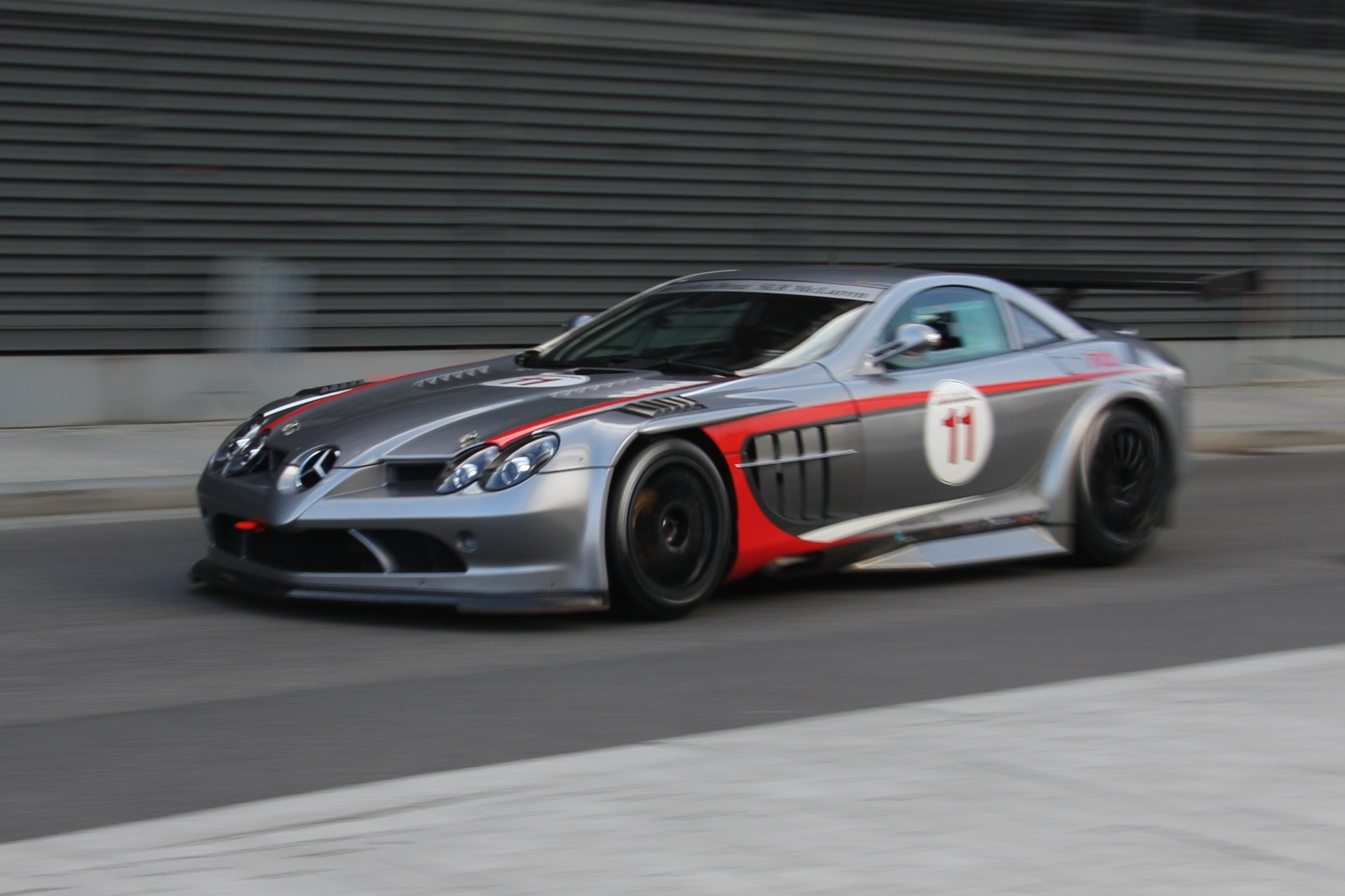
(Road and bridge on the French Riviera on the left, and Mercedes SLR on the right).
The environment called Coast, resembling landscapes of the French Riviera, features driving a roadster.
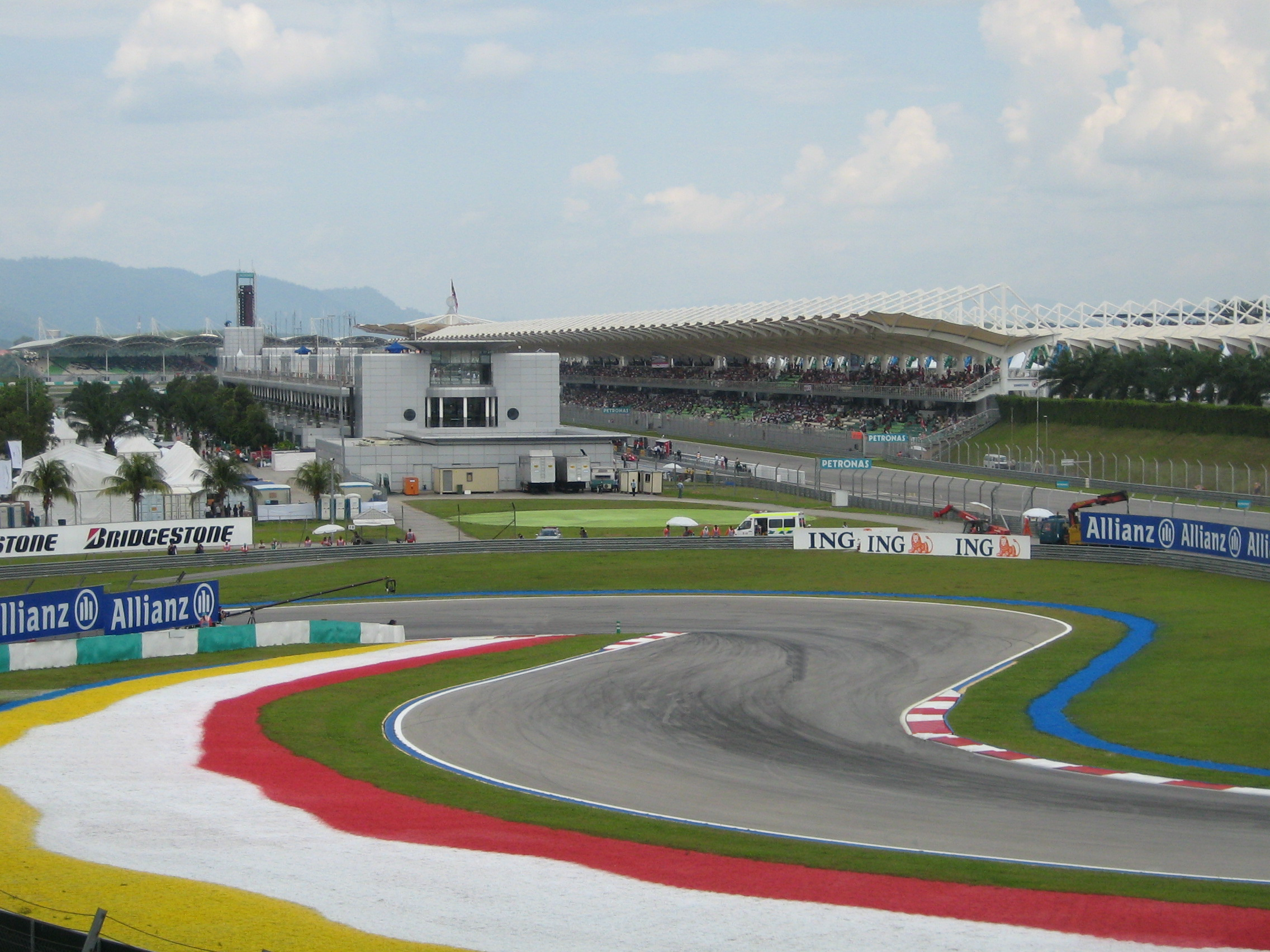
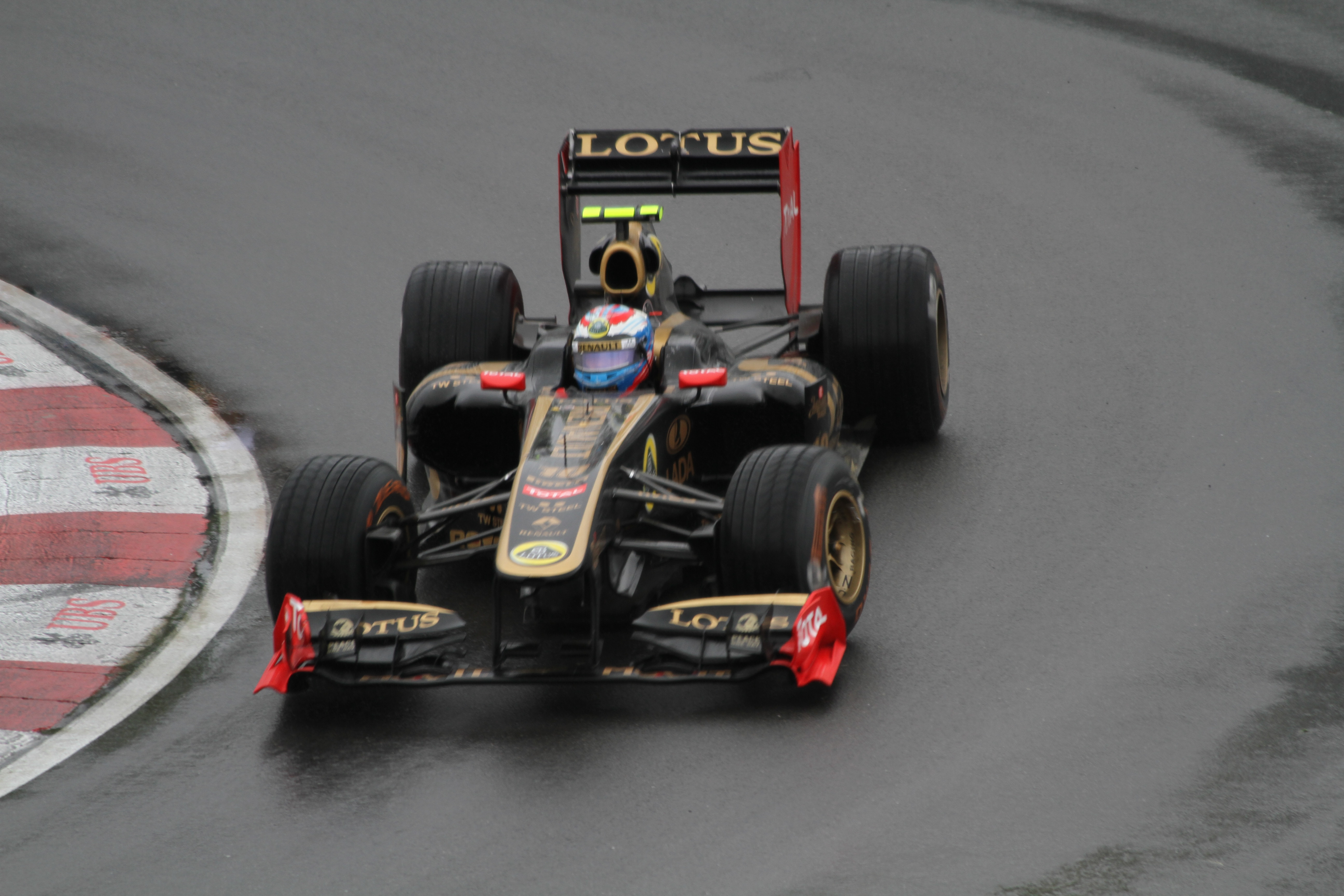
(Sepang International Circuit in Malaysia on the left, and Formula One open-wheel car on the right).
The Stadium environment is a very large competition stadium, featuring a car resembling a Formula One open-wheel car.

Visually, it features flat sandy expanses dotted with large canyons and rocky mounds. Paved roads alternate between fast stretches of straights, tricky sections, and exaggerated curves. Potholes regularly litter the road.

The "Rally" environment takes place in lush, bucolic, and melancholic settings. Tracks alternate between wide curves and tight hairpin turns, consisting entirely or partially of paved or dirt roads, dotted with medieval buildings such as castles and ramparts, which can sometimes be driven over. The tracks, which feature numerous elevation changes, sometimes cross rivers, but remain very low to the ground. They include narrow passages and are lined with trees or meadows. The only vehicle available is similar to a Renault 5 Turbo 2. Fast and responsive, it offers simple handling focused on skid control and requires adaptation to surfaces that alternate between asphalt, dirt, and grass.

The "Snow" environment is set in a snow-covered landscape inspired by Asia. Its roads alternate between high-grip and partially or fully icy sections, with tracks featuring jumps, sharp turns and slippery surfaces. The player drives a pickup truck with relatively low speed but strong handling and maneuverability, allowing it to take corners at comparatively high speeds.

The "Island," "Bay," and 'Coast' environments are from the second installment of the series: TrackMania Sunrise. "Island" is an exotic universe, Sunrise's iconic environment and the fastest setting with a sunny atmosphere. The tracks, lined with palm trees, run alongside the sea. Resembling wide highways with numerous jumps, they are the most tortuous and zany in the series (at that time in 2007) thanks to loops, jump ramps, and quarter-pipes. Players drive a Ferrari-like sports car and must negotiate large curves at high speed while mastering long drifts. In terms of driving, it is the most accessible environment, leaving room for improvisation and offering a large margin for error. The "Bay" environment is entirely urban and takes place in a sort of sunny seaside resort. The highly detailed visuals create an urban atmosphere. The tracks are exclusively paved and often lead, thanks to the omnipresent elevation changes, to the quays or the roofs of buildings. They sometimes feature obstacles. The player is at the wheel of a very responsive 4x4 that can reach its top speed very quickly and has highly reactive steering. The driving is fast, flexible, and very energetic, with a marked stunt aspect. Suspensions are extremely dynamic. Changes in pace and direction are commonplace. "Coast" takes place in a sunny Mediterranean setting with a relaxing atmosphere. Visuals are reminiscent of small villages in the south of France or Italy, where the edges of the tracks are dotted with typical cottages. The tracks, bordered by the sea, consist of straight and winding roads, marked sections of circuits, escarpments, and jumps. The player drives a roadster that skids easily and requires careful braking. Driving this vehicle requires a combination of brake-acceleration control and outside-inside-outside trajectories. It requires managing difficulties at low speeds, despite the need for higher speeds in certain turns. This precise and technical driving style is intended to be more simulation-oriented (but still far from the sophisticated simulations of the genre).

"Stadium" is the latest environment created by Nadeo for the release of United. Originally from TrackMania Nations, it features a kind of Formula 1 single-seater that requires fast, technical driving and is easy to handle. Speed management is key on these narrow tracks. There are numerous jumps on the tracks, making mastery of trajectories during jumps an important part of gameplay. The tracks are confined to a large multi-purpose stadium. The weather is always fine, with clear blue skies. The whole thing resembles a motocross or supermoto competition stadium. The ground surfaces are partly or entirely concrete, dirt, or closely cut grass, the latter favoring off-road racing.

=== Game modes ===
TrackMania United includes a total of nearly 200 pre-built solo tracks, increasing in difficulty and unlockable progressively based on the silver and gold medals obtained. In all game modes, tracks are classified by difficulty level: "beginner," "easy," "normal," "difficult," and "extreme". They are presented in a table composed of thumbnails displaying the type of environment. They are also marked according to four criteria representing their nature: Race, Acrobatic, Endurance, and Speed. Through the interface, players can download tracks created by other players. Tracks created for previous games can also be played in United.

The game offers three single-player modes: "Race," "Platform," and "Puzzle". The first mode follows the classic principle of a timed race in which the player must achieve the best time. In the second mode, a hybrid of racing and platform games, players must jump from platform to platform, usually located high above the ground, without falling (into water, for example), turning around, or leaving the track. Players must complete the race in as few attempts as possible, but without any time constraints. In the last game mode, the player must complete incomplete tracks using elements from the level editor. Players can build the tracks however they want using the available blocks and try to achieve the best time. The single-player mode displays the rankings of other players around the world, by level, based on the player's results. When the player accesses a track in single-player mode, they are shown the results and rankings of other players on the Internet for comparison at the end of the game. They can download tracks and rate them based on difficulty and design criteria.

In multiplayer mode, United uses the same game modes as previous versions: "Time Trial," "Tour," "Team," "Cup," and "Loop". The game can be played online or on a local network. It offers some new features such as rankings by city, county, region, country, or internationally. Time Trial follows the principle of solo racing. In the Stage mode, players earn points based on their results, and the winner is the player who reaches the score limit set by the server. The Team mode works on the same principle, but players compete for a team whose points are accumulated. The Cup mode also uses this points system, but the points limit allows players to advance to a final in which the player with the best time is declared the winner. As for Loop mode, it allows players to race for a set time on a circuit with several laps, and the winner is the player who passes the most checkpoints marked along the tracks.

In Hotseat mode, players can take turns playing on the same machine with two game modes: time trial or a set number of attempts.

The TrackMania United Forever expansion adds the "Stunt" mode from previous games. This uses the same gameplay system as in solo mode. In an urban setting, players perform somersaults with their cars to perform tricks similar to those seen in skateboarding. The player earns more or fewer points depending on the tricks performed. If they cross the finish line after the time limit, a portion of their points, proportional to their delay, is deducted.

=== Features ===
TrackMania United includes all the features of the series. The level editor, which includes new road and scenery building blocks bringing the total number to nearly a thousand It is now available in two versions: a simplified version and a more complex version. Entirely mouse-controlled, the editor uses a simple system of thumbnails representing blocks. Then, a simple click or drag-and-drop installs them. Tracks created for previous games can also be improved and then played in United. The replay editor, which allows video creation, has a redesigned, simplified interface with new tools. This includes the ability to add text, sounds, camera movements, smoke or light trails, fades, and other effects to these videos. In the paint shop, the bodywork of vehicles can be customized. It is also possible to customize vehicles or download them, as with tracks.

== Development ==
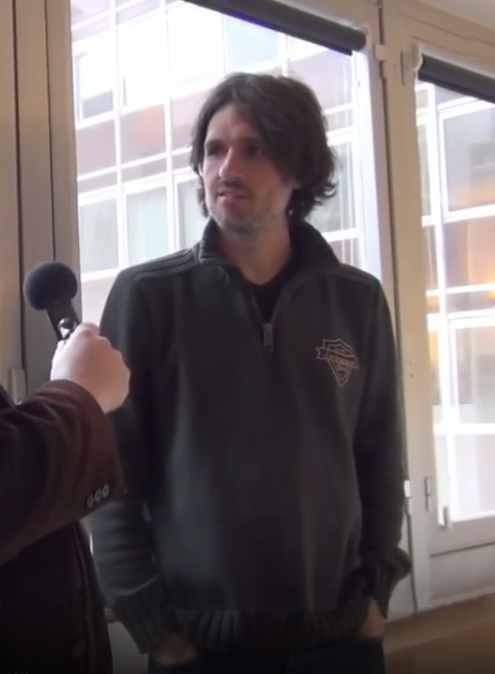
Florent Castelnérac, director of Nadeo (2013 photo)

=== Team and origins ===
TrackMania United was developed by Nadeo. It was the French company's biggest project until the creation of United Forever. Nadeo presented United as the culmination of the TrackMania project. It was born out of a desire to bring together all the players spread across the different games: TrackMania, TrackMania Sunrise, and TrackMania Nations.

Nadeo points out that the project required a lot of effort and forced the team to work very hard. The company focuses its development on programming and the features it can offer players. It has many more programmers than artists and says it could have hired more, with the aim of "marketing its games more easily" by making them "more mainstream." However, it deliberately focuses most of its resources on programming. In this case, Nadeo considers this aspect to be very costly. At the end of 2007, the game consisted of nearly 1.4 million lines of code. The game's development represented 200,000 hours of work, carried out solely by the team of twelve people who had been with TrackMania since the beginning. Florent Castelnérac managed the project. Programming was supervised by Olivier Toreilles, alongside Xavier Bouchoux. Amélie Castelnérac designed the levels.

"When starting the development of Trackmania United, we decided not to do anything that would sell" (Florent Castelnérac).

As it has done since the launch of the TrackMania franchise, the team takes the community's opinion into account. In order to increase the game's long-term appeal, Nadeo separates two lists of tasks to be accomplished: those intended for novice players and those designed to satisfy the desires of experienced players.

According to Castelnérac, while consoles are ideal for entertainment, the benchmark for online gaming is still the PC (in 2007). It is one of the reasons why the franchise is not available on consoles. As an example, he cites World of Warcraft and Counter-Strike, which were only released on PC, and adds the 20 million downloads of Nations (in 2007) . While developing the game, Castelnérac confirmed that shifting the game towards more simulation-based gameplay, with damage and collisions, would probably never happen because it's not the essence of the TrackMania concept and other games already do that.

=== Environment design ===
The desert is the first environment ever created by Nadeo. For technical reasons, but also as an editorial choice, the team decided to adopt a highly realistic visual style. It believes that this choice makes the environment more mature and appealing, in contrast to the fantasy of the tracks. The car, equipped with spring suspension that makes it lean on two wheels when cornering, was designed specifically to reinforce the fantasy aspect of driving and contrast with the realism of the graphics.

"Rally" was created to add variety to the initial game, after the creation of Desert. In order to avoid player fatigue, Nadeo gave this vehicle different handling characteristics. To be consistent with the world and driving style of rally racing, the company created a vehicle that could handle skidding and cornering on tracks with varied surfaces and scattered obstacles. The team deliberately chose to create richer visuals. For "Snow," the team created a very arcade-like driving experience thanks to a highly maneuverable vehicle that skids very little. This feature was also inspired by the very airy feel of the tracks. Nadeo revealed that it took a more "glamorous, American" approach to designing the "Island" universe. Gameplay is deliberately as arcade-like as possible and, in the team's own words, "mainstream" and tinged with "a big Out Run influence".

The 'Bay' environment is actually a remake of the "Desert" universe, which has evolved independently of the choices made in it. The idea was to strike a compromise while retaining the gameplay of this environment, which the company considers successful. Driving in these two worlds is almost identical, with a few adjustments, notably the weight of the 4x4. Nadeo considers the driving in "Coast" to be completely opposite to that of 'Island' and the environment to be "perhaps the most serious". According to the company, the "Stadium" universe is the culmination of all the team's knowledge of level design (in 2006). The team considers it a little less "crazy" than the others, but its main appeal is that it can be played entirely with a keyboard, so as not to give an advantage to players using gamepads, an essential component for a game intended for online competition.

There is no survival mode because the tracks for this mode are too specific, and there is no Crazy mode because Nadeo considers it too "crazy". Two new environments, "Toy" and "Moon," were started but then scrapped because they would have been smaller and, more importantly, less consistent with the rest of the game's designs.

=== Track design ===
The tracks are designed almost entirely by Amélie Castelnérac. They are created from scratch, starting with the simplest maps and ending with the most complicated ones. The circuits are all created using the game's level editor. This allows any bugs in the editor or in the game to be detected. When she considers that the track she has just created is "correct," she has it tested by a player who has never played TrackMania before. The aim is to assess the accessibility of the circuit, as the team finds it very difficult to take a step back from their creations because they play them so often. This feedback allows us to make some adjustments to the difficulty level. The starting tracks are deliberately simple and very wide, but fun, so as not to frustrate beginner players with tracks that are too difficult and complex, which would send them crashing into the walls at the first turn.

Amélie Castelnérac makes sure to keep the file size reasonable so that the game can run on all configurations. She always tries to add a jump or a loop to give each track its own identity by combining jumps and driving. She believes that these constraints make the task more complex. In contrast, the most difficult tracks must be sufficiently technical and fast-paced so as not to bore experienced players. Florent Castelnérac regularly intervenes and generally changes a few building blocks in order to "give the track its own style". All track creations by players come with a certain amount of pressure. Amélie Castelnérac says that every time she creates a track, she wonders how appealing it will be to the community, which is very active and productive in this area. She also feels that she "draws a little inspiration from what others have done," especially. Prior to creating an official campaign, she logs on to play TrackMania online and downloads the most popular tracks. This allows her to identify what players like and what she "wants to find in terms of fun". According to Florent Castelnérac, the team has learned from its past mistakes and has succeeded in creating better tracks. In order to avoid repetitive races and the impression of always doing the same thing, new categories have been created (Race, Acrobatic, Endurance, and Speed). The team wanted to make all the tracks more accessible, resulting in a lack of highly technical tracks.

The reference times are set internally in about 30 minutes per track. The team plays a track several times, and when they can't improve on the result, that becomes the "Author" time. The gold, silver, and bronze medal times are automatically calculated proportionally to this reference time.

Finally, Amélie Castelnérac must check that there are no shortcuts, that the checkpoints are correctly placed, and that the scenery is harmonious.

=== Graphics and features ===
The United game engine is broadly identical to that of Nations, although it has undergone numerous improvements. Nadeo has added an additional graphics engine, increasing the total number to five, in order to enable the game to run on the latest generation of graphics cards (2007) as well as on lower-end configurations. It is the team's goal to achieve a consistent frame rate regardless of the machine's hardware capabilities.

Graphics improvements to the Stadium universe were made due to the new lighting system, which required the team to recreate all of the building blocks.

Just before the release of United, Castelnérac believed the game to be immune to cheating, both in-game and in terms of coppers, which play a more important role in this installment. Nevertheless, since United uses a lite version of StarForce, cheating was still possible. That said, the company subsequently developed its own anti-cheat technology. The Nations Forever version no longer uses StarForce, which has been replaced by a proprietary system. The game is also No-CD. Nadeo has improved the voting system to prevent certain people from artificially inflating the statistics.

As more and more features were added, the level editor became too complex. A simplified version of the editor was therefore created.

=== Creation of new features ===
Nadeo explains that the goal is to create a persistent world, without avatars, in which players can play, evolve, collect, or create content. Beyond this, the goal of United, and ManiaLinks in particular, is to facilitate the sharing of user-generated content related to the TrackMania franchise.

ManiaZones is directly inspired by sports associations, which offer the same structure of matches and competitions by level and region. The advantage of offering such rankings and opponents by region and level is to avoid discouraging players with a single, large ranking, giving them the impression that it is easier to climb the ladder because it is smaller.

The establishment of a virtual micro-economy based on coppers stems from Nadeo's desire to limit the content posted online by the community on the company's official servers. Nadeo did not want to allow coppers to be converted into real money in order to limit their use to a recreational context.

=== Extension design ===
TrackMania United Forever was the French company's biggest project at the time of the game's release in April 2008. According to Nadeo, United Forever marks the end of a cycle, a kind of completion: the ultimate TrackMania game that incorporates all aspects of the series, i.e., gameplay, online play, competition, editor, and sharing. Nadeo considers TrackMania 1.0 to be complete with United and TrackMania 2.0 to be complete with United Forever. Rather than making sporadic corrections, the aim of the expansion is to consolidate the game to ensure its longevity. However, the company considers the additions to be sufficient to offer players a paid version.

=== Soundtrack ===
The music for TrackMania United was composed by French artist DOO. It consists of technical, rhythmic instrumentals created on a synthesizer, as well as melancholic sounds and melodies played on a metal guitar. The game allows players to listen to their own music.

== Marketing and expansion ==
In previous releases, Nadeo and Focus Home Interactive have been known to cause confusion regarding upcoming releases, providing vague or contradictory information about possible sequels, standalone games, free episodes, or add-ons. In this regard, Jeuxvideo.com reported on March 22, 2006, the creation of a game called TrackMania Planet, scheduled for release in September 2006. On June 27, 2006, the site revealed that Nadeo had created three domain names: trackmaniaplanet.com, trackmaniaunited.com, and trackmaniaarena.com. However, the name TrackMania United was leaked on the series' official forums, and Focus more or less revealed the likely release of this game in October 2006 in its release schedule.

On June 30, 2006, Nadeo and Focus took advantage of their presence at the ESWC, where TrackMania Nations was included as a discipline in this international competition, to announce the development of this new game in the TrackMania series. This standalone game, called TrackMania United, was presented on the official website on July 1 as a compilation of all the environments created up to that point, with new features such as twice as many building blocks for the Stadium environment and a new track scoring system. The situation was clarified when the game was widely presented to the press on September 29, 2006, where its release was announced for the following November 17. The new features were not in terms of gameplay but in three new functionalities: the ManiaZone, copper management, and ManiaLink.

On October 11, Nadeo announced that there would be no demo for United, but a beta for which 1,000 players would be selected at random. Registration opened on October 19 and the participants were announced the following day. Beta testing took place the following week. The game was presented at the Video Game Festival on October 7 and 8, 2006, in Paris, and previewed on November 16, the day before its release, at a Fnac store in Paris. TrackMania United was released in France on November 17, 2006, by Focus. The game was released by Deep Silver in Germany on February 23, 2007, and in the United Kingdom on March 9. It was initially planned for release in the US on March 23, along with the international release. However, problems with the original publisher, Ascaron Entertainment, and distribution rights delayed the release date. Focus finally released the game on June 11, 2007.

TrackMania United was available for pre-order on Steam on June 7, 2007, and released on June 14. The game received a lot of criticism from players regarding the use of StarForce protection and the problems it caused. Following numerous complaints, Nadeo released a version of the game without the controversial protection on June 29, 2007. The update was automatically installed for all owners of the game.

On December 11, 2007, Nadeo released a version of the game called TrackMania United: Friends Edition, which included the original game as well as a code allowing a third party to download another copy of the game, set of stickers, and the Forever expansion, which was coming out at that time.

On October 7, 2007, Nadeo announced on the official discussion forums that a standalone expansion for United called TrackMania United Forever would soon be available free of charge to owners of the game. TrackMania United Forever was released by Focus on April 15, 2008, as a free version for owners of United. The following day, a similar expansion pack called TrackMania Nations Forever for Nations was released for free. Both expansion packs mainly allow players to play both games together in multiplayer mode in the Stadium environment. The Rally, Desert, and Snow environments from the first game received a graphical update. The game combines all previous patches released for United. The game features a redesigned interface, network code, enhanced security, and a redesigned scoring system. In addition to slight graphical improvements, this expansion offers 65 new tracks and new building blocks for the level editor. Players can also create and manage groups of friends in the game, similar to Facebook or Myspace. The game adds the "Stunt" mode from previous installments. Taxes on coppers have been standardized. ManiaLinks have become more flexible.

There is also a new feature that allows you to view the game in anaglyphic 3D using 3D glasses. United Forever's boxed version includes a pair of 3D glasses. In order to meet the expectations of players who obtained the expansion via download, Focus Home Interactive, in association with publisher Future, released a magazine titled TrackMania, the official magazine, in France on May 28, 2008. It is dedicated to the series with features, interviews, and reports, and also includes a pair of glasses and a boxed version of the game on DVD.

Like United, TrackMania United Forever was improved after its release thanks to a large number of patches. United Forever was also released on Steam on April 17, 2008.

TrackMania United Forever: Star Edition (TMUFSE) is a new edition of TrackMania United Forever released by Focus on November 26, 2009. The game is available in boxed form but can also be downloaded free of charge by owners of United Forever, and features 140 new tracks. The number of tracks has been increased to nearly 420 thanks to a track campaign called StarTrack. The campaign is the result of a contest held on the TM-Exchange community site in collaboration with Nadeo, which brought together the best track creations from players to include them in an official campaign. This winner, nicknamed PapyChampy, who saw his tracks compiled into an official game, was hired by Nadeo following the contest, at Nadeo Live.

== Reception ==
=== Commercial ===
During its marketing campaign, TrackMania United was mistakenly perceived abroad as a kind of compilation and did not perform as well as it did in France.

The game does, however, enjoy a very active community. At launch, the TrackMania series had nearly 100,000 tracks created by players across all episodes. Upon release, United already had numerous tracks created by players due to the activity of beta testers.

=== Critical reception ===
Video game reviews
Print media
Media	United
Canard PC (FR)	7/10
Edge (UK)	8/10
Joystick (FR)	6/10
PC Gamer (UK)	8,6/10
PC Zone (US)	8,6/10
PC PowerPlay (AU)	8/10
PC Gamer (US)	75%
Digital media
Media	United
Gamekult (FR)	6/10
GameSpot (US)	8/10
GameSpy (US)	3/5
GameZone (US)	7,9/10
IGN (US)	8/10
Jeuxvideo.com (FR)	16/20
JeuxvideoPC.com (FR)	19/20
PC Gamerworld (US)	85%
GameDaily (US)	8/10
4Players.de (DE)	88%
Review aggregator
Media	United
Metacritic	80% (based on 27 reviews)

TrackMania United was generally well received upon its release by critics, who noted its varied visuals, ability to run on modest configurations, and fun gameplay. A few criticisms were regularly raised, notably that the game resembled a kind of compilation, that there was nothing new in the gameplay system, that the only additions were ManiaLink, the ManiaZone system, and the evolution of coppers, and, as usual, that there were no collisions between vehicles. At the end of May 2018, the game had an average rating of 80% based on 27 reviews on Metacritic, and 79.79% based on 29 reviews on GameRankings.

The New York Times describes the game as a "strange hybrid" between a racing game and a puzzle-solving game. According to Gamekult, the official mode, which requires players to perform at a specific moment, places the game at the heart of the competitive aspect. Jeuxvideo.com notes the lack of innovation in terms of gameplay and consequently lowers its rating slightly, even though the site appreciates the overall quality of the game. According to Canard PC|Canard PC, the game "recycles the proven gameplay of the series in attractive Web 2.0 packaging". Edge considers the new copper system to be balanced. GameSpot finds the single-player mode rather repetitive and the puzzle mode disappointing due to puzzles and clues that are rarely logical. IGN considers the variety of environments, gameplay, and surfaces to be very important.

For the site, the inability to cheat and the identical vehicles have the merit of making the game more fair. PC Zone believes that the difficulty has been rebalanced appropriately, much lower than that of Sunrise. GameSpy describes the menus as clunky, boring, and requiring a lot of mouse clicks. The site notes with regret the lack of control sensitivity settings. According to Edge, ManiaLink is the most important feature created for the community in a game. However, the magazine is surprised that Nadeo wants to divide players into a multitude of zones, when the company claims to want to bring them together. PC Zone is pleasantly surprised by the speed and efficiency of ManiaLink, which surpasses all other games the journalist has tried so far (in 2007). The game is sometimes compared to a massively multiplayer online game thanks to these features.

Jeuxvideo.com describes the graphics as "beautiful, but above all effective [because the game runs] smoothly on modest configurations". JeuxVideoPC.com regrets the desert-like appearance of the surroundings around the tracks and therefore considers the scenery to be "a little empty". GameSpot is enthusiastic about the graphics and wonders how Nadeo was able to combine such visual quality with very high execution speed, even on an entry-level computer. IGN notes an "exceptionally" fast and consistent frame rate, with no slowdown except momentarily online when there are too many cars. The site found the visuals to be colorful, detailed, and varied, with superb lighting. The cars may not be as detailed or animated as those in a game like Colin McRae: Dirt, but the models are effective. GameSpy noted the variety of graphics and found them to be clean and undemanding in terms of system resources.

Jeuxvideo.com considers the new music to be successful but repetitive over time. According to GameSpot, it is well suited to its environment and has the merit of drowning out the noise of the car crashes and the screeching of tires, which are not very prominent. IGN also notes that the sound effects are almost inaudible and considers the number of music tracks to be too limited.

The game has been criticised for the lack of collisions between vehicles, a recurring complaint. GameSpy notes the high level of frustration caused by the need to discover tracks in order to complete them and regrets the heavy reliance on trial and error. The site also dislikes the online tracks created by players, which are too fast-paced or reserved for the best drivers due to their level of difficulty. GameSpot regrets the presence of advertising, even if it remains discreet and confined to online multiplayer.

Jeuxvideo.com considers United to be more than just a compilation. According to JeuxVideoPC.com, it is much more than a collection of the other titles in the series; it is their synthesis and the culmination of the TrackMania project. IGN believes that Trackmania United is poised for a solid future thanks to the tools it offers, its community, connectivity, and sharing. British magazine PC Gamer describes the game as "crazy and superb". GameSpy considers the game fun despite its flaws. PC Zone awards it the title of best semi-underground game available (in February 2007). Nevertheless, Joystick magazine notes that, despite a few additions to satisfy the community, the game offers nothing really new and is more like a compilation. Canard PC also notes the lack of content, as does the American edition of PC Gamer.

=== Reviews of United Forever ===
Video game reviews
Print media
Media	United Forever
Canard PC (FR)	7/10
PC Gamer (UK)	8,2/10
The Games Machine (IT)	82%
Micromania (ES)	93%
PC PowerPlay (AU)	9/10
Digital media
Media	United Forever
Eurogamer (UK)	9/10
PC Gameworld (US)	88%
Gamestar (DE)	88%

At the end of May 2018, TrackMania United Forever had an average rating of 81.11% on GameRankings, based on 9 reviews.

PC PowerPlay found the arcade gameplay to be rather shallow, while PC Gameworld felt that there were still many subtleties despite the simplicity of the controls, including the need to adjust speed, perform jumps and landings at the right angle, and position the car correctly on the track depending on the track layout. It also highlights the wide variety of different environments. PC PowerPlay appreciates the vehicle physics and the differences between the various cars and their balance. The magazine describes the community features as "wonderful," especially since the series' success relies heavily on them. The Games Machine only mentions improvements to the interface and community management. PC Gameworld considers the game to be at the forefront in this area.

The Games Machine finds that the graphics engine, which is almost the same as Sunrise's, has aged well and offers smooth, clean visuals that work on entry-level configurations. PC Gameworld also notes this last point and finds the graphics to be sometimes limited and bland. According to Canard PC, the visual contributions lie mainly in the stereoscopic vision, which creates a "strong 3D effect." The magazine advises against playing with this option for more than 15 minutes to avoid headaches and regrets that it is ultimately just a gimmick.

PC Gameworld generally appreciates the title and concept of the TrackMania series, despite the weakness of some less entertaining environments. The Games Machine considers the game to be a small but classic step forward in the series, unpretentious and structurally reinforcing the concept. Canard PC expresses its exasperation at the overexploitation of the franchise, even though Nadeo has implemented a policy of free or low prices, desperately awaiting a true sequel.

== Legacy ==
=== Awards and distinctions ===
TrackMania United was named best racing game of 2007 by the website Shacknews and by Play magazine. On February 1, 2007, the website GamesRadar+ included it in its list of the most anticipated PC games by gamers in the United States. In May 2007, PC Zone ranked it 68th in its list of the 101 best video games of all time. In July 2007, PC PowerPlay ranked it 46th in its top 100 best PC games. In August 2007, PC Gamer ranked it 91st in its top 100 best video games.

At the 2008 edition of the Video Game Festival in Paris, TrackMania United Forever won the Milthon award for best PC game. In August 2008, PC Gamer ranked it 48th in its top 100 best video games.

In 2010, the TrackMania franchise inspired advertisers, who used the game's concept and ghost cars to promote the features of a car in a television commercial.

In 2016, members of the TrackMania community created a video featuring 20,000 cars at the same time. The replays of these players were recorded on TrackMania Nations Forever and TrackMania United Forever, then converted and compiled in TrackMania² Stadium.

=== Series ===
At the end of 2007, Nadeo indicated that it wanted to stick to the model of two games in operation: a free online multiplayer game plus a full paid game. However, the company changed its strategy. Nadeo subsequently outsourced the porting of the TrackMania franchise to Nintendo platforms to Firebrand Games. In 2008, TrackMania DS was released on Nintendo DS, and in 2010, TrackMania was released on Wii and TrackMania Turbo on DS.

Since 2011, Nadeo has been developing a series of PC games called TrackMania², each offering a unique environment. TrackMania²: Canyon was released in 2011, TrackMania²: Stadium in 2013, TrackMania²: Valley in 2013, and TrackMania²: Lagoon in 2017. All of the environments were new, except for Stadium, which was based on the sports world of Nations, but the main attraction was the ability to create custom game modes.

TrackMania remained on the PC platform for a very long time and took a long time to find its way onto consoles. In 2016, however, Nadeo opted for the first time for a multi-platform release with a new game called TrackMania Turbo, bringing all the fundamentals of the series to consoles, notably PlayStation 4 and Xbox One. This game introduces new features such as procedural track generation, two-player vehicle driving, and compatibility with Oculus Rift HTC Vive, and PlayStation VR.

=== Esports ===
In January 2008, just before the release of the TrackMania United Forever expansion, Joystick magazine noted the game's difficulties in establishing itself in the world of esports. TrackMania was nevertheless played at the ESWC until 2012 in Nations and Nations Forever, which that same year saw the arrival of TrackMania²: Canyon, also in competition. It took over the TrackMania mantle at the ESWC for the next few years with TrackMania²: Stadium. Despite Nadeo's desire to unite all its players with United, a fragmentation of the online player community has persisted since its release, mainly caused by new versions of the game split into separate environments sold at inflated prices, as well as a lack of communication from Nadeo.
