= TrackMania (2003 video game) =

2003 racing video game

- Developer: Nadeo
- Publishers: FRA: Focus Home Interactive; UK: Digital Jesters; US: Enlight
- Director: Florent Castelnérac
- Composer: Henri-Pierre Pellegrin
- Series: TrackMania
- Platform: Windows
- Release: FRA: November 21, 2003; UK: November 28, 2003; NA: June 24, 2004
- Genres: Racing, puzzle
- Modes: Single-player, multiplayer

TrackMania is a racing video game developed by Nadeo and published by Focus Home Interactive. It is the first game in the TrackMania series.

== Gameplay ==
TrackMania includes some pre-constructed tracks that players can race on to unlock "coppers", the in-game currency. These can be used to buy different building blocks, usually called "blocks", for their track, including regular roads, checkpoints, long bends, loop-the-loops, and jumps, which all snap to a grid automatically. Regular roads can be dragged to create straight sections as well as 90 degree corners. Most other blocks are automatically connected by placing them next to each other. There are three environments to choose from: Rally (Countryside), Snow (Alpine), and Desert (Speed), each of which offers a unique car and handling characteristics. There are also three modes: Race, Puzzle, and Survival, each of which features an equal number of tracks for each environment. The "Survival" mode does not appear in the later games, though Platform bears some slight similarities in map styles.

TrackMania has three styles of cars, rally super minis (similar to a Renault 5 Turbo), alpine 4x4s (similar to a Suzuki Jimny), and speed muscle cars (similar to a Ford Escort). Each has numerous skins making a total of 87 different looking cars available. Using the built-in car painter or an external graphics editor, players can create their own skins, or modify the originals.

The game features a multiplayer option, which allows players to compete via hotseat or a LAN, and over the Internet while players may upload their created tracks or skins to the game's website for use by other players.

== Reception ==
Reception

Aggregate score
Aggregator	Score
Metacritic	74/100

Review scores
Publication	Score
Computer Games Magazine	4/5
Computer Gaming World	2.5/5
Edge	7/10
Eurogamer	8/10
GameSpot	8/10
GameSpy	3/5
GameZone	7.9/10
IGN	5.9/10
PC Format	81%
PC Gamer (US)	72%

The game received "average" reviews according to the review aggregation website Metacritic. Alex Navarro of GameSpot called the game "completely worth it if you have any interest in PC driving games or ever liked miniature cars as a kid." Saying that "the driving mechanics aren't perfect, and it isn't much to look at," he nevertheless called it "a great game with plenty of depth and lasting appeal." Scott Osborne of GameSpy called the races "fast-paced and reasonably fun," but also said that "they're often too easy and always much too short," criticizing the brevity of the game's single-player and puzzle mode. Tom McNamara of IGN said that "the game looks pretty good," but that it was "not fun to play so much as being fun to play around with," ultimately calling it "a temporary diversion" that "just can't compete with the big boys."

GameSpot described the game as the best computer game of July 2004. The game was also a runner-up for the site's "Most Surprisingly Good Game" award, which went to The Chronicles of Riddick: Escape from Butcher Bay.

== TrackMania Original ==
TrackMania Original is an October 12, 2005 re-release of TrackMania that runs on the TrackMania Sunrise graphics engine. It features over 10 new block types, from PowerUp! and SpeedUp! (unreleased) patches, as well as some functionality from Sunrise such as ad-panels and MediaTracker effects. This version also allows the player to import 3D models for the cars, which can also be skinned. It was released free of charge for owners of TrackMania, in the form of a patch/expansion pack, and made available in store as a cheap collector's edition containing bonus features.
