= GamersOrigin =

- Game: League of Legends; Fortnite; Hearthstone, StarCraft; TrackMania; Street Fighter; Soulcalibur; Apex Legends
- Founded: March 2011

GamersOrigin is a French professional esports club founded in March 2011 by Guillaume Merlini, based in Paris.

GamersOrigin has professional teams on League of Legends, Fortnite, Hearthstone, StarCraft, TrackMania, Street Fighter, Soulcalibur and Apex Legends.

== History ==
GamersOrigin was established in 2011 as a fansite of Diablo, but eventually became a gaming news and media website, and finally an esports club.

In 2017, GamersOrigin opened section of League of Legends with five players. This section quickly proved to be a success with good results on the French scene. Since 2017, GamersOrigin refocuses on esports by putting an end to its news site and web TV O'rigin in 2019.

== Championships ==
League of Legends teams

Date	Place	Tournament
2018-12-01	1	Red Bull Itemania 2018
2019-06-23	1	Occitanie Esports 2019
