= ShootMania Storm =

2013 video game

- Developer: Ubisoft Nadeo
- Publisher: Ubisoft
- Composer: Mick Gordon
- Series: TrackMania
- Engine: ManiaPlanet
- Platform: Microsoft Windows
- Release: 10 April 2013
- Genre: First-person shooter
- Mode: Multiplayer

ShootMania Storm is a first-person shooter video game by Ubisoft and Ubisoft Nadeo as a spin-off title of the TrackMania series.

Just like its sister games TrackMania 2 and the yet-unreleased QuestMania, it features 3 different environments, of which two have so far been revealed; a snow-based environment called Cryo, and another called Storm. Storm was released first, with Cryo to be released later.

Nadeo have stated they intend to make ShootMania stand out from other FPS games through design features such as using a rocket launcher-style weapon as the game's primary weapon. Florent Castelnérac (the game's project leader) has stated there will be relatively few different weapons, the idea being to minimize game time spent not in gameplay.

The game still uses the map editor introduced in TrackMania. Character editing is restricted, with only a shield on the player's back customizable.

The game was set to be released on 23 January 2013, but was delayed to 10 April 2013 with an open beta started on 12 February.

== Reception ==
Reception

Aggregate score
Aggregator	Score
Metacritic	76/100

Review scores
Publication	Score
Destructoid	8/10
Electronic Gaming Monthly	7.5/10
Eurogamer	9/10
GameSpot	7.5/10
GamesRadar+	3.5/5
GameZone	8.5/10
Hyper	7/10
IGN	7.8/10
PC Gamer (UK)	73%
VentureBeat	82/100
Digital Spy	3/5
Metro	7/10

ShootMania Storm received "generally favourable reviews" according to the review aggregation website Metacritic.
