= TrackMania Turbo =

TrackMania Turbo may refer to:

- TrackMania Turbo (2010 video game), a Nintendo DS video game
- TrackMania Turbo (2016 video game), a Windows and console video game
