= Virtual Skipper 5: 32nd America's Cup: The Game =

2007 video game

- Developer: Ubisoft Nadeo
- Publisher: Focus
- Platform: Windows
- Genres: Racing game, Simulation
- Modes: Single-player, multiplayer

Virtual Skipper 5 is the 5th installment of Ubisoft Nadeo's Virtual Skipper series for Windows. It is a series of sailing simulator games targeted at semi-experienced sailors rather than casual gamers. This installment concentrates particularly on the 32nd America's cup held in Valencia Spain in 2007. The game allows the user to take the helm of many different classes of boats including International America’s Cup Class, Melges 24, Offshore Racer, Trimaran, Open 60 and even more are available as add-ons from unofficial sources. Single-player allows competitions in both match racing and fleet racing, while multi-player allows the above two and team racing. The races take place around some different types of courses in many different settings ranging from Valencia to Sydney, to Rio and many more. The typical race course is a windward leeward course with a gate at the leeward end.

Other features of the game are full weather with waves and built-in wind shifts to affect tactics and a nearly full set of International Sailing Federation rules. There is a tutorial mode that will teach any user how to sail the boats and how to play the game by the rules to use them to gain a tactical advantage, which is a large part of sailing.
