= TrackMania Turbo (2010 video game) =

2010 Nintendo DS racing game

- Developer: Firebrand Games
- Publishers: EU: Focus Home Interactive; NA: City Interactive
- Composer: Allister Brimble
- Series: TrackMania
- Platform: Nintendo DS
- Release: EU: September 24, 2010; NA: April 19, 2011
- Genre: Racing
- Modes: Single-player, multiplayer

TrackMania Turbo is a racing video game developed by Firebrand Games. The successor to TrackMania DS, it was released on September 24, 2010 in Europe by Focus Home Interactive, and on April 19, 2011 in the US by City Interactive. It was released at the same time as TrackMania: Build to Race (known as TrackMania in Europe) for the Wii. It received generally favorable reviews from critics.

== Gameplay ==
Trackmania Turbo features gameplay similar to that of other games in the Trackmania series and includes a comprehensive track editor. There are 150 available tracks across 4 total environments, including Stadium, Island, Coast and Snow. Three game modes are also included; "Race", "Puzzle" and "Platform". Players are able to play together locally up to 4 players, and can play on official or custom tracks through Nintendo Wi-Fi Connection.

== Reception ==
The game received an aggregate score of 77/100 on Metacritic.

Jon Blyth of Official Nintendo Magazine UK rated the game 83/100, praising the game's loading times and framerates, as well as its Track Editor. However, he criticized the game's smaller number of tracks compared to TrackMania: Build to Race.
