= Nadeo =

French video game developer

Ubisoft Nadeo
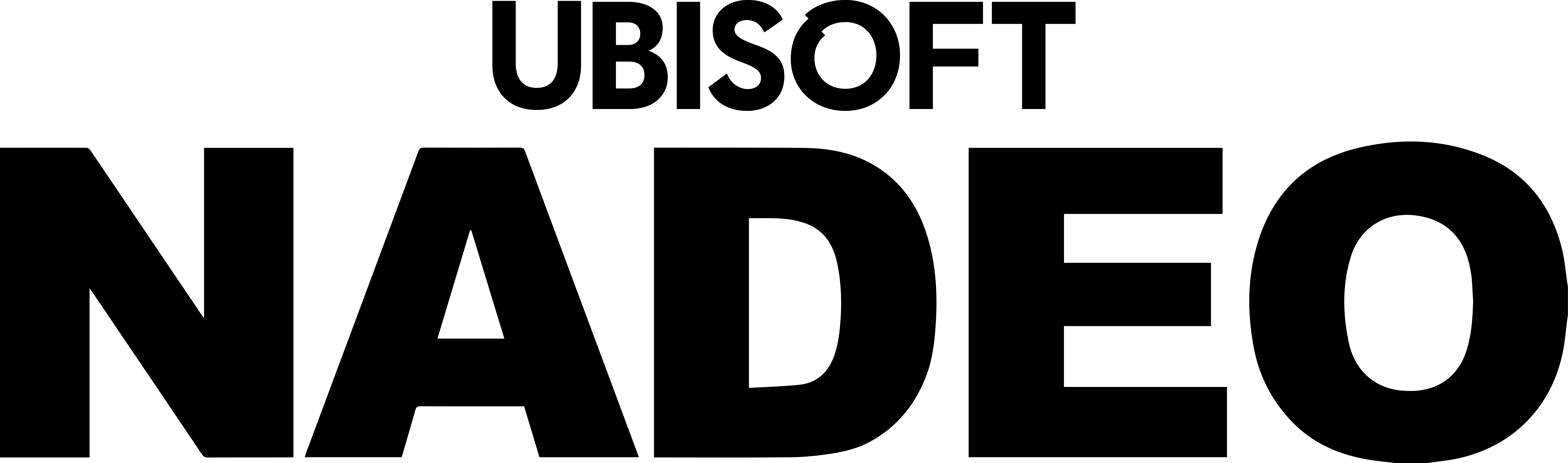
- Type: Subsidiary
- Industry: Video games
- Founded: 2000; 26 years ago
- Founders: Florent Castelnérac; Pascal Hérold
- Headquarters: Paris, France
- Products: TrackMania; ShootMania; Virtual Skipper
- Parent: Ubisoft (2009–present)
- Website: www.ubisoft.com/en-us/studio/nadeo

Ubisoft Nadeo (English: /ˈnɑːdioʊ/ NAH-dee-oh, French: [nadeo]) is a French video game developer founded in 2000. The studio is best known for creating the racing game series TrackMania. Other games developed by Nadeo include the Virtual Skipper series and ShootMania. Its latest release is Trackmania (2020). Since 2009, Nadeo has been a subsidiary of Ubisoft.

== History ==
Nadeo was founded in 2000 in Paris, France, by Florent Castelnérac and Pascal Hérold. Their first game was Virtual Skipper 2, released in 2002. In 2003, Nadeo released the first entry in the TrackMania series, which received "mixed or average reviews" from critics. TrackMania reached over 700,000 unique players each month, and had 10 million registered players by 2009. In 2009, Nadeo was acquired by Ubisoft for an undisclosed sum.

In September 2020, Creative Director Florent Castelnérac was accused of abusive behavior and bullying towards his staff.

== Games developed ==
Year	Title	Publisher(s)	Platform(s)
2002	Virtual Skipper 2	Focus Home Interactive	Microsoft Windows
2003	TrackMania	Digital Jesters, Focus Home Interactive, Enlight Software, Buka Entertainment	Microsoft Windows
2003	Virtual Skipper 3	Focus Home Interactive, Enlight Software	Microsoft Windows
2005	TrackMania Sunrise	Digital Jesters, Enlight Software	Microsoft Windows
2005	Virtual Skipper 4	Focus Home Interactive	Microsoft Windows
2006	TrackMania Nations ESWC	Focus Home Interactive, Deep Silver	Microsoft Windows
2006	TrackMania United	Deep Silver, Enlight Software, Buka Entertainment	Microsoft Windows
2007	Virtual Skipper 5	Focus Home Interactive	Microsoft Windows
2008	TrackMania Nations Forever	Focus Home Interactive	Microsoft Windows
2008	TrackMania United Forever	Focus Home Interactive	Microsoft Windows
2011	TrackMania 2: Canyon	Ubisoft	Microsoft Windows
2013	TrackMania 2: Valley	Ubisoft	Microsoft Windows
2013	TrackMania 2: Stadium	Ubisoft	Microsoft Windows
2013	ShootMania Storm	Ubisoft	Microsoft Windows
2016	TrackMania Turbo	Ubisoft	Microsoft Windows, PlayStation 4, Xbox One
2017	TrackMania 2: Lagoon	Ubisoft	Microsoft Windows
2020	TrackMania	Ubisoft	Microsoft Windows, PlayStation 4, PlayStation 5, Xbox One, Xbox Series X/S
