= Digital Jesters =

British video game publisher

Digital Jesters was a British video game publisher, based in Welwyn Garden City, Hertfordshire. The company was founded in 2003 by veterans from CDV UK (after the UK office was shut by CDV), and their first UK-releases were TrackMania and Virtual Skipper 3, both by Nadeo.

In the beginning, they concentrated on the UK market only, but began publishing games in other regions as well. Notable releases included TrackMania Sunrise (UK & Scandinavia), Freedom Force vs. the Third Reich (UK & Scandinavia), the Pro Rugby Manager series (UK) and Chaos League (UK).

Despite a well publicised investment, on 22 December 2005 a winding-up order was made against the company in the Birmingham District Registry of the UK High Court on the petition of Kaoscontrol Limited. This followed a period where the company was accused of withholding payments to various developers they had worked with, resulting in some developers terminating contracts with the publisher. Their website disappeared soon after.

The last game the company released was a racing game based on the Crazy Frog licence in November 2005.
