= TrackMania DS =

2008 Nintendo DS racing game

- Developer: Firebrand Games
- Publishers: EU: Focus Home Interactive; NA: Atlus USA
- Composers: Allister Brimble, Anthony N. Putson
- Series: TrackMania
- Engine: Octane
- Platform: Nintendo DS
- Release: EU: November 14, 2008; NA: March 17, 2009
- Genres: Racing, puzzle
- Modes: Single-player, multiplayer

TrackMania DS is a racing video game developed by Firebrand Games. It was published by Focus Home Interactive in Europe and released for the Nintendo DS on November 14, 2008, and in the United States by Atlus USA on March 17, 2009. The game received generally favorable reviews from critics.

== Gameplay ==
TrackMania DS features gameplay similar to that of the other titles in the TrackMania series and also features a comprehensive track editor. It supports single-player and multiplayer play and contains more than 100 tracks and three game modes ("Race", "Platform" and "Puzzle"). Of the seven environments available in the PC version only three are featured in the DS version: "Rally", "Desert" and "Stadium". With TrackMania DS, players can share tracks with other game owners, but there is no online connectivity.

== Development ==
Firebrand Games was contracted to develop the Nintendo DS version of the Trackmania series. Nadeo, the main developer of the games, was not involved in its day-to-day production with the developer. Most of the tracks in the game were developed by Firebrand Games' designer Clive Lawrence, but TrackMania fans in Europe were also worked with to help develop some of them.

The game was published by Focus Home Interactive in Europe and Australia. After a year delay, the game was released in North America by Atlus USA.

== Reception ==
The game received an aggregate score of 75/100 on Metacritic. Eurogamer's Tom Bramwell praised Trackmania DS for its graphics, while noting the lack of online multiplayer or track sharing was a "missed opportunity." Both Bramwell and IGN Australia noted that track visibility was inherently a challenge because of the small screen on the Nintendo DS, making racing less intuitive than it would otherwise be.
