= TrackMania 2 =

2011 racing video game

- Cover art for Trackmania 2 Canyon, the first Trackmania 2 game
- Developer: Ubisoft Nadeo
- Publisher: Ubisoft
- Series: TrackMania
- Engine: ManiaPlanet
- Platform: Microsoft Windows
- Release: Canyon; 14 September 2011; Stadium; 27 February 2013; Valley; 4 July 2013; Lagoon; 23 May 2017
- Genre: Racing
- Modes: Single-player, Multiplayer

TrackMania 2 (stylized as TrackMania²) is a racing video game developed by Ubisoft Nadeo and published by Ubisoft as part of the TrackMania series.

== Gameplay ==
TrackMania 2 features gameplay similar to that of previous games in the series. The player can race on various tracks, with the ability to do stunts in various modes, including a championship and a cooperative mode. The track editor from previous games also returned. A new "ManiaScript" is being created to help players add new features in the game. As the game's popularity grew, players began uploading complicated custom built courses onto YouTube showcasing their creativity.

== Episodes ==
The release of TrackMania 2 Canyon was through a combination open-beta/preorder available on 17 August 2011. This allowed those who pre-ordered access into the multiplayer beta, to get the remainder of the features automatically activated upon the game's official release on 14 September 2011. On 27 February 2013, the game was also released on Steam along with the new installment of the series, TrackMania 2 Stadium. TrackMania 2 Canyon includes a single new environment for the series: Canyon. As of January 2024, TrackMania 2 Canyon features 2 official gameplay modes: Race and Platform.

TrackMania 2 Canyon was followed by TrackMania 2 Stadium and TrackMania 2 Valley in 2013 and then TrackMania 2 Lagoon in 2017.

== Reception ==
Reception

Aggregate scores
Aggregator	Score
GameRankings	79.80%
Metacritic	81/100
