= TrackMania Sunrise =

2005 racing video game

- North American cover art
- Developer: Nadeo
- Publishers: FRA: Focus Home Interactive; UK: Digital Jesters; US: Enlight
- Director: Florent Castelnérac
- Platform: Microsoft Windows
- Release: UK: April 2005; WW: May 2005
- Genre: Racing
- Modes: Single-player, multiplayer

TrackMania Sunrise is a racing video game developed by Nadeo and published by Focus Home Interactive. The second game in the TrackMania series, it was released in April 2005 in Europe and May 2005 in Russia and the United States. It received positive reviews from critics, who called it an improvement on its predecessor.

== Gameplay ==
The game features more realistic graphics and contains three environments: Island, Bay, and Coast. As in the original game, each has a unique car to fit the environment's characteristics. "Island" features fast sports cars which can turn sharply on mostly wide roads while "Bay" has bouncy cars with less traction, making accidental oversteering more likely. "Coast" features slower cars with little traction and small roads where cars are able to drift through corners. The game was built on an overhauled engine for better visuals and Internet connectivity with tracks that include skinnable advertisement panels. This version also features two new gameplay modes: Platform, where the player attempts to complete a course from start to finish, passing mandatory checkpoints and restarting as few times as possible, and Crazy, which pits the player against ghosts, each of which has a faster time than the last. Many of the races in Platform mode have jumps and obstacles that make it difficult to stay on the track, and players in Crazy mode must score a faster time than each ghost without exceeding an overall time limit.

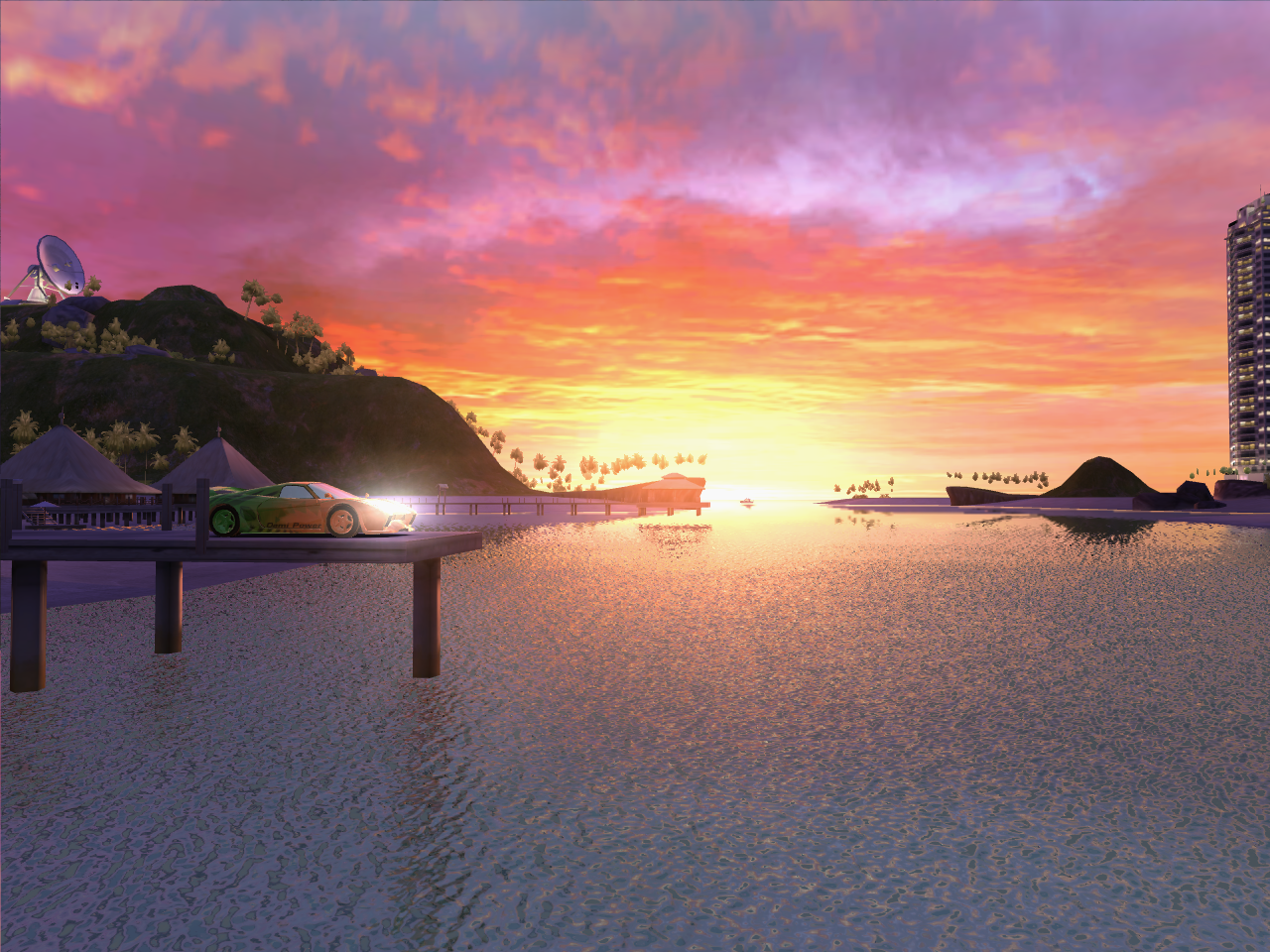
An image of the Island environment showing the island car during sunset

Some of TrackMania Sunrise other enhancements were later added to the Original edition of the game. These include the ability to import new car models and customize many more aspects of the game. "Sunrise" features improved Internet connectivity and implements a peer-to-peer system allowing players to share car models, skins, and more. The new track editor primarily uses the mouse as opposed to the keyboard-driven original, and makes possible special effects like displaying text and changing the camera angle using Media Tracker.

== Reception ==
Reception

Aggregate score
Aggregator	Score
Metacritic	82/100

Review scores
Publication	Score
Computer Gaming World	4/5
Edge	7/10
Eurogamer	9/10
Game Informer	7.25/10
GameSpot	8.2/10
GameSpy	4/5
Hyper	86/100
IGN	8/10
PC Gamer (US)	78/100
PC Zone	83/100

The game has an aggregate score of 82/100 on Metacritic.

== TrackMania Sunrise eXtreme ==
A free expansion pack called eXtreme was released later while the game was also repackaged as TrackMania Sunrise eXtreme, which added multiple elements to enhance the speed and number of stunts in the game. The new "stunt mode" lets players obtain points by performing stunts, such as spinning the car around in mid air and doing flips. After the expiry of a set amount of time, points earned are quickly drained, so players must try to finish with the best score before the time expires.

== Mini TrackMania ==
Mini TrackMania is a simple, online, Macromedia Flash game developed by Inbox Digital to promote TrackMania Sunrise. The game is played with a side on, 2D perspective, and has only one track featuring jumps and a nitrous boost on both sides of the road against a backdrop featuring some islands. Only the keyboard's left and right arrow keys are used to play the game, which are assigned to "brake" and "accelerate" respectively.

The objective of the game is to score as many points as possible by jumping off a series of ramps without crashing the car on landing or failing to clear the gap. The key to successfully clearing the ramps is to keep the car's speed within the two indicated points on the car's speedometer, which move closer and closer to each other after every jump.
