= Test Drive: Ferrari Racing Legends =

2012 racing video game

- Cover art featuring a Ferrari FXX
- Developer: Slightly Mad Studios
- Publisher: Rombax Games
- Series: Test Drive
- Platforms: PlayStation 3, Xbox 360, Microsoft Windows
- Release: PlayStation 3 & Xbox 360: NA: 3 July 2012; EU: 6 July 2012; UK: 15 August 2012 (PS3); AU: 22 August 2012; Microsoft Windows: WW: 10 December 2012
- Genre: Racing
- Modes: Single-player, multiplayer

Test Drive: Ferrari Racing Legends is a racing video game developed by Slightly Mad Studios and published by Rombax Games under license from Atari for PlayStation 3, Xbox 360 and Microsoft Windows. The game is a departure from the semi-simulation open world sandbox-gaming style seen in Test Drive Unlimited and its sequel, returning to the closed circuit racing that was last seen in Test Drive 6, and also resembling the game Le Mans 24 Hours which was branded as a Test Drive title in the United States on some platforms.

Development for the game began shortly after the release of Shift 2: Unleashed and uses the same engine to showcase "convincing physics models" and a "one of a kind experience for all driving enthusiasts". The main gameplay in the video game is driving simulation, although the developer claims it to be a balance between simulation and arcade racing. The game does not feature car customization of any kind, as Ferrari forbade the inclusion of such a feature on their officially licensed car models.

Ferrari Racing Legends focuses on Ferrari's history across almost all of the racing disciplines, especially Formula One and sports car racing. There are over 50 different Ferrari cars to drive, and each shows off full realistic interior and exterior models, as well as damage effects. The game was released in celebration of the 65th anniversary of the first Ferrari car ever built, the Ferrari 125 S of 1947.

== Gameplay ==
The gameplay of Ferrari Racing Legends is simulation-oriented, similar to Shift 2: Unleashed.

The gameplay in Ferrari Racing Legends is intended to be much closer to past Test Drive games like Test Drive II through Test Drive 6, but with racing taking place in closed circuits and inspired by other games developed by Slightly Mad Studios such as the Need for Speed: Shift titles, on which the game bases its dynamic models and damage effects. In addition, the game features only Ferrari cars as indicated by the game title, with over fifty car models available. Besides road cars, the game includes race cars covering multiple motorsport disciplines, ranging from Formula One to sports car racing, and even rallying. There are 36 circuits in total, including Spa and Monza along with other Grand Prix tracks and test circuits.

Also, the single-player mode, also known as the campaign mode, guides the player through the history of Ferrari cars, just as Electronic Arts did with the Porsche brand in their dedicated Need for Speed installment from 1999, Porsche Unleashed. This career mode spans three eras in Ferrari's history: Gold (from 1947 to 1973), Silver (from 1974 to 1990) and Modern (from 1990 to 2011). The player is not restricted to playing straight through history. Instead, the career can be started in any era. On the multi-player side, the game features up to 8-player online interactions, as well as the mentioned single-player mode.

== Vehicles ==
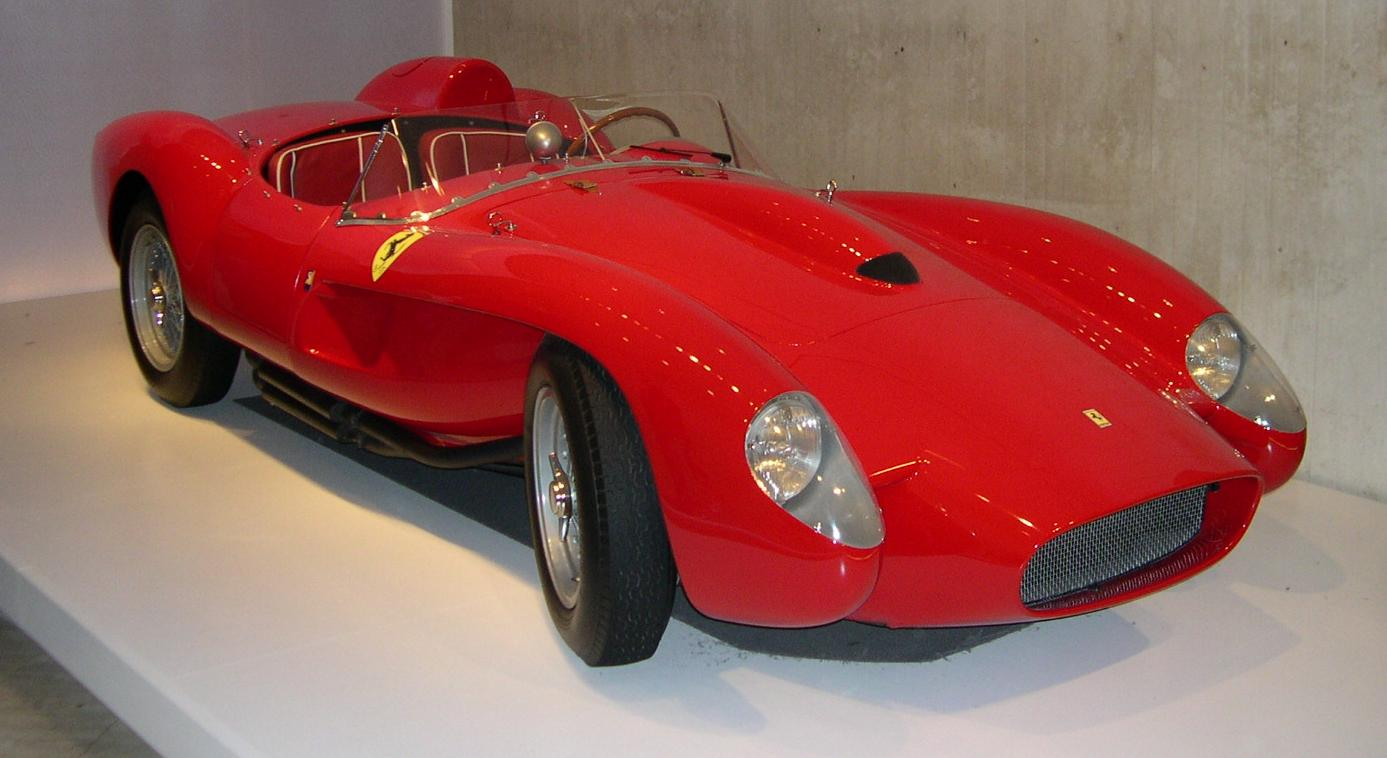
The 250 Testa Rossa from 1957 is one of the historic vehicles featured in the game.

A total of fifty-one Ferrari cars are available to drive. Eleven of those cars are single-seater cars, including the Ferrari F2008 and the 150° Italia; twelve are sport cars, including the 458 Italia and the FXX; and twenty-seven are GT cars, including the famous 348 Spider and the 575M Maranello.

Suzy Wallace, producer at Slightly Mad Studios, in an interview with Jeff Gedgaud from Yahoo!, said that "we worked closely with Ferrari in making sure that the models of the car[s] were accurate. That involved getting CAD data and blueprints for the cars, as well as technical information and specs for the cars". She (Wallace) also mentioned that car customization would not be available on the game, as "Ferrari doesn't allow us", further explaining that "they [Ferrari] feel that each car comes out of the factory perfectly balanced".

The game features vehicles from every decade, starting with the 125 S and 166 Inter from the 1940s, through to the 150° Italia from 2011.

== Circuits ==
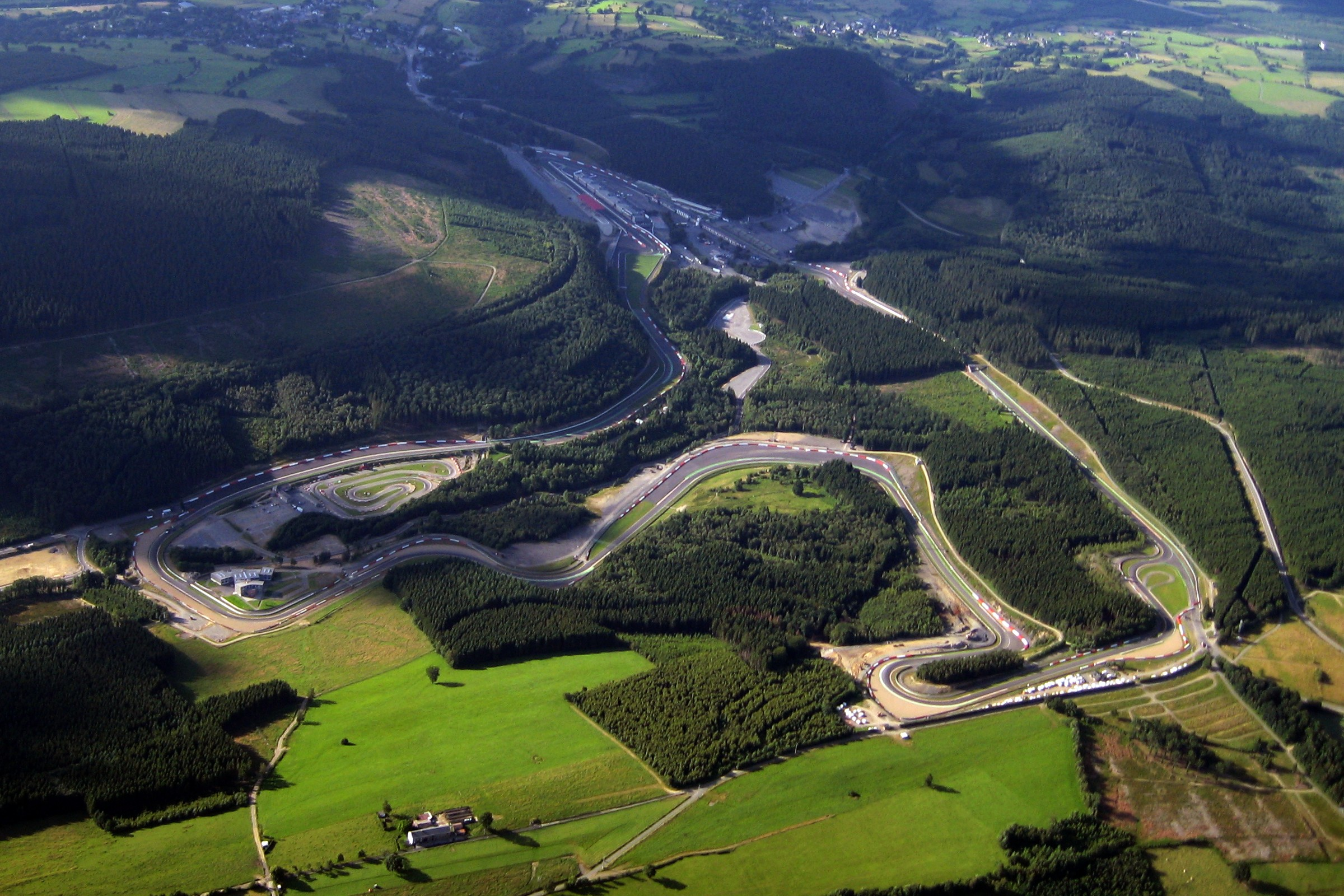
Spa-Francorchamps is one of the 36 circuits included on the game.

36 circuits are featured in the game, with some tracks appearing more than once in a number of historical configurations; e.g., the Silverstone Circuit can be experienced three different ways: in its 1959, 1975, and 2009 layouts. The game also features closed tracks like Rouen, along with fictitious tracks like Misty Loch.

== Development ==
Slightly Mad Studios begun development of the game just after finishing Shift 2: Unleashed. Ferrari Racing Legends uses the same engine used in Slightly Mad's other titles, and cycles through around 50 of the Italian manufacturer's racecars and production models, and includes rally, Formula One and GT racing modes. The game was announced by franchise owners Atari in February 2012 as a collaboration between Atari, Rombax Games, Slightly Mad Studios, Bigben Interactive, and Avalanche, where each company handled one portion of the title. Rombax handled publication of the title, Avalanche secured the Ferrari license and co-produced the game, and Bigben secured physical distribution in France, Belgium, Netherlands, Germany, Portugal, and Scandinavian territories.

Atari managing director Peter Banks described the collaboration positively, stating that the "producers and the folks at Ferrari just sat down with the vehicle list and pulled out their favorite cars, as well as some that we felt hadn't been fully explored in the genre to date". About the game, Jim Wilson, CEO of Atari, said that “Test Drive: Ferrari Racing Legends is a landmark chapter of the iconic Test Drive saga,[...], Ferrari has been an essential partner throughout the history of the Test Drive franchise, and the opportunity to celebrate the unrivaled Ferrari Racing Team and the legendary Ferrari brand promises a one of a kind experience for all driving enthusiasts". Alain Falc, CEO of BigBen Interactive, commented that "we're really excited in distributing this 20th Test Drive title with such a great brand featured in the game as Ferrari. The history of the brand is well represented in this simulation with more than 50 mythic vehicles, 36 tracks and with more than 100 different events to achieve. Slightly Mad Studios has done a really good job on the development and all gamers will be quite surprised with this beautiful title. A praise to Ferrari and the Test Drive license".

Unlike the previous game, Test Drive Unlimited 2, the Ferrari-only edition is track-based and not an open world game. Suzy Wallace, producer at Slightly Mad Studios, when asked if the game will be released on other platforms rather than PC, PlayStation 3 and Xbox 360, commented that "not at this time".

== Reception ==
=== Pre-release ===
Adam Dolge from PlayStation Universe commented that "on the surface it feels like a generic driving sim, but digging a little deeper it's easy to see there is something here for every racing fan, especially Ferrari junkies". On his preview of the game, he praised the studio's work on "convincing physics models", agreeing that "cars handle as expected—lightening-fast(sic) acceleration coupled with tight corner control across the fleet". Website D-Xbox Games commented that Ferrari Racing Legends wasn't "visually stunning", stating that the environments felt "empty and soulless", the sense of speed was "not very impressive" and that "unfortunately, there is no night race, or dynamic weather". The website also commented that cars doesn't receive much damage due to restrictions made by Ferrari, concluding that "without any projection, these cars, as beautiful as they are, do lose a lot of their charm".

Jonas Allen from Daily Game, on his preview of the game, stated that "if you're a Ferrari fan and have ever wanted to sit behind the wheel of one, Test Drive: Ferrari Racing Legends is the closest thing you'll find to stepping foot in these legendary cars without spending your life savings". Andrew Hayward from Official Xbox Magazine commented that the game "isn't as flashy or fresh feeling as your average modern racer" and "beyond the vehicles themselves, the tracks look a little sparse and generic". He concluded that "for car enthusiasts, the latest Test Drive seems to hit the most essential notes, being an appreciative historical document with stellar mechanics and a wide array of vehicles".

=== Post-release ===
Reception

Aggregate score
Aggregator	Score
Metacritic	PS3: 62/100; X360: 61/100

Review scores
Publication	Score
Game Informer	6.5/10
GameSpot	5.5/10
IGN	6.5/10
Official Xbox Magazine (UK)	7/10
Official Xbox Magazine (US)	5/10

Test Drive: Ferrari Racing Legends received "mixed or average" reviews, according to review aggregator platform Metacritic.

The most positive review came from German website VideoGamesZone, on which an editor gave 78% and commented that "it looks fair and sounds great but on the other hand the career mode especially in the first hours lacks variety and the game's difficulty isn't balanced very well". Mike Channell from Official Xbox Magazine UK awarded the game a score of 7 out of 10 and stated that "Even with EA's Need For Speed-branded gloss stripped away and replaced by rudimentary menus, there's still a satisfying, if bare-bones, driving game beneath".

Nathan Meunier from IGN gave the game a score of 6.5 out of 10 and stated that its "high-speed thrills hit the wall too soon in the punishing campaign, and despite a solid range of multiplayer, quick race, and time-trial options, progressing through the three distinct eras to unlock all the tracks and sweet rides is a big part of the fun that gets trampled by the clumsy execution". Matthew Kato from Game Informer also awarded the game 6.5 out of 10 but gave a somewhat more negative review of it, stating that "this is a zero-sum game that appeases nobody" and that it "does not exhibit the best of what the sports car brand nor the developer have to offer".
