= Test Drive (disambiguation) =

A test drive is a trial use of a motor vehicle.

Test Drive may also refer to:

- Test Drive, a series of racing video games
  - Test Drive (1987 video game), the first game in the series
  - Test Drive (2002 video game)
- Test Drive (EP), 2011 EP by Jin Akanishi
- "Test Drive", a 2018 song by Joji from Ballads 1
- "Test Drive", a 2021 song by Ariana Grande from the deluxe edition of Positions
- Pepsi Max & Jeff Gordon Present: Test Drive, a 2013 American short film

== See also ==
- Drive testing – Evaluation of a mobile radio network
- Driving test – Evaluation of a person's driving skills
