= Test Drive 4 =

1997 video game

- North American cover art featuring the 1966 Shelby Cobra 427 (left) and the 1997 Dodge Viper GTS (right)
- Developer: Pitbull Syndicate
- Publisher: Accolade
- Producers: Slade Anderson; Chris Downend
- Series: Test Drive
- Platforms: PlayStation, Windows
- Release: PlayStation: WW: 3 November 1997; JP: 2 April 1998; Microsoft Windows: WW: 24 November 1997
- Genre: Racing
- Modes: Single-player, multiplayer

Test Drive 4 is a 1997 racing video game developed by Pitbull Syndicate and published by Accolade for PlayStation and Windows. It offers 14 supercars and muscle cars, and tasks the player with beating computer opponents in tracks set in real life locales. The game's tracks are long courses with rural roads and urban streets, and commonly feature traffic and sharp corners. The player has to arrive at each checkpoint (a banner with text such as "Stage 1" or "Stage 2") before the Checkpoint Timer expires, resulting in additional time, and crossing the finish line is required to complete the race. Test Drive 4's commercial success briefly made Test Drive the best selling racing franchise, but the game received mixed reviews. In 1999 the game was republished under the Greatest Hits label after selling 850,000 copies within one year of its release.

== Gameplay ==
The player (shown driving a 1966 Shelby Cobra) in third place during a race in Keswick, Cumbria, England, United Kingdom

Test Drive 4 offers 14 supercars and muscle cars, and tasks the player with beating computer opponents in tracks set in five real life locales: Keswick, Cumbria, San Francisco, Bern, Kyoto, and Washington, D.C.; the Windows version adds a sixth location: Munich. The game's tracks are long courses with rural roads and urban streets, and commonly feature traffic and short corners. The player has to arrive at each checkpoint (a banner with text such as "Stage 1" or "Stage 2") before the Checkpoint Timer expires, resulting in additional time, and crossing the finish line is required to complete the race. The police car can chase and stop a player who exceeds the speed limit; to counter this, the player either stops in front of the police car or outruns it. Only a few vehicles are available to the player from the outset, with the rest needing to be won or purchased as the game progresses.

In singleplayer, the player can participate in a Single Race, a Cup, or a Drag Race. The game also offers multiplayer; the Windows version of the game has three Network Options: serial, modem, and LAN, while the PlayStation version supports the PlayStation Link Cable.

== Development and release ==
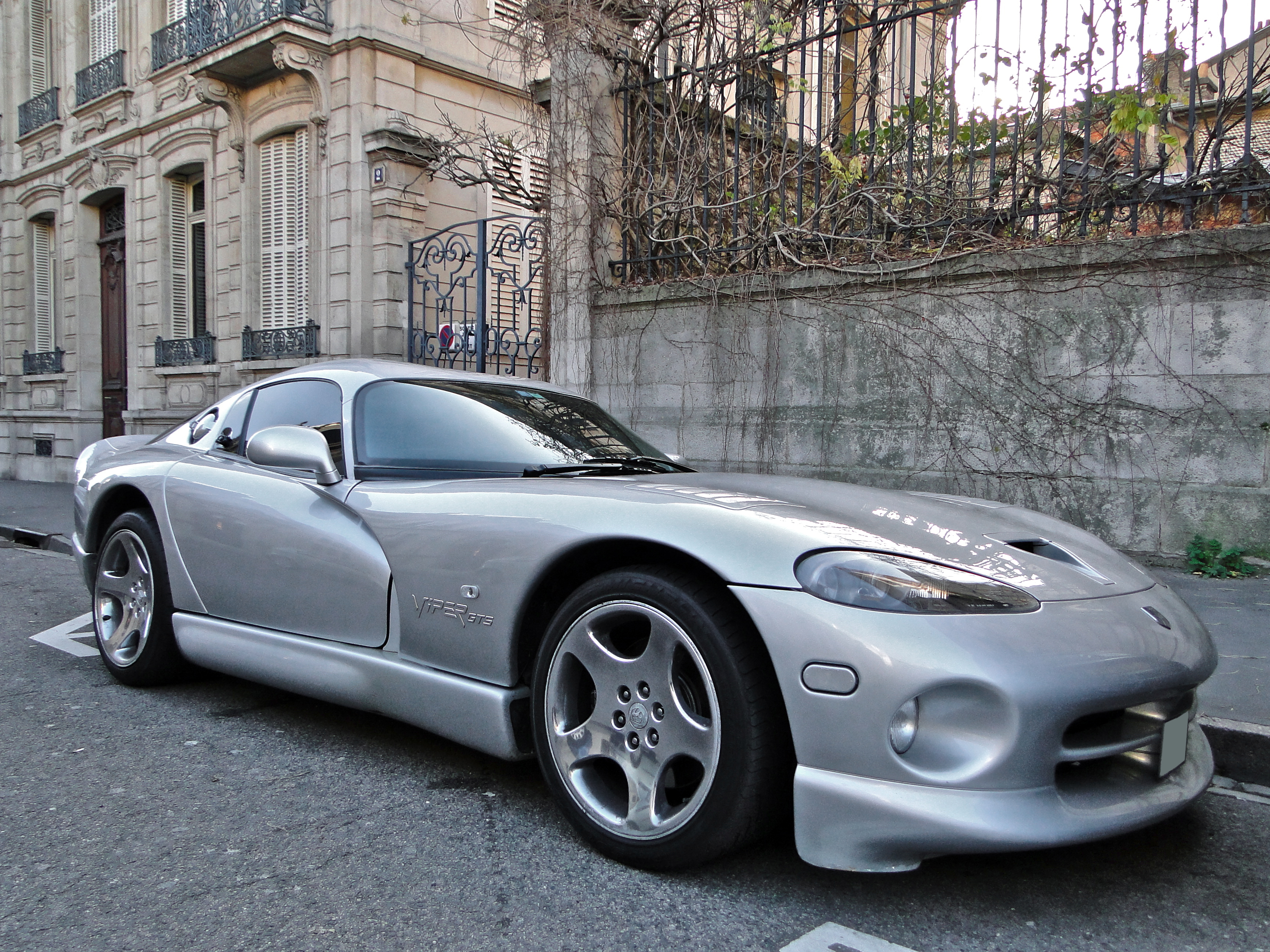
The Dodge Viper is one of the fourteen vehicles licensed for Test Drive 4.

English video game developer Pitbull Syndicate was established in December 1996 by eight experienced programmers and artists. In 1997, the studio designed Test Drive 4 in collaboration with publisher Accolade. According to Accolade president and CEO Jim Barnett, the game exploits 3D graphics to offer a satisfactory driving experience. Its fourteen vehicles were used under license from car designers such as Chrysler, the owner of the Dodge and Plymouth automobile brands. In contrast to multi-lap circuits found in most other racing games, Test Drive 4 only had linear point-to-point courses. The game's race tracks are realistically modeled after real places such as Kyoto, Japan and Washington, DC. Test Drive 4's techno-oriented soundtrack includes licensed songs from the bands Orbital and The Younger, Younger 28's; Accolade executive producer Chris Downend considered the two bands suitable for the game's energetic gameplay style.

Test Drive 4 was displayed at the 1997 Electronic Entertainment Expo (E3), and Accolade announced its November release date. Prior to its completion, the publisher spent $2 million on a promotional campaign for the game; television commercials ran on ESPN, Speedvision, and MTV during the final two weeks of November, and radio advertisements appeared on The Howard Stern Show in December. Accolade vice president Stan Roach said that the company anticipated the game to be the highest-selling racing title of the winter season (and also its most successful product "in years"), and that the advertisements are the first time they signed promotional deals with broadcasting media since the beginning of the "16-bit market". Accolade published the game on 3 November for PlayStation, and 24 November for Microsoft Windows. The Windows release came in two versions, one with support for 3dfx video cards, and another with a software renderer. Electronic Arts imported its PlayStation version to Japan on 2 April 1998.

== Reception ==
=== Sales ===
As of March 1998 the game sold over 850,000 copies. Because of its commercial success, the PlayStation version was republished under the Greatest Hits label. Accolade stated in a press release that the commercial successes of the game and the off-road-themed Test Drive: Off-Road caused Test Drive to become the top-selling racing series at the time.

=== Critical reviews ===
Reception

Aggregate score
Aggregator	Score
GameRankings	71% (PS)

Review scores
Publication	Score
AllGame	3/5 (PS)
Computer Games Strategy Plus	1/5 (PC)
Computer Gaming World	2/5 (PC)
Edge	6/10 (PS)
Electronic Gaming Monthly	6.125/10 (PS)
Famitsu	27/40 (PS)
GameRevolution	B (PS)
GameSpot	5.5/10 (PS)
IGN	7/10 (PS)
Next Generation	2/5 (PS)
Official U.S. PlayStation Magazine	3.5/5 (PS)
PC Gamer (US)	63% (PC)

Reviews for Test Drive 4 were divergent, disagreeing on many aspects of the game, and ranged from mediocre to moderately positive. For example, reviewers for Electronic Gaming Monthly (EGM) and GameSpot both felt the inclusion of oncoming cars and police cars help liven up the action and were a distinctive feature of the Test Drive series, but Next Generation found them irritating and unfairly difficult to avoid due to the sensitive steering, and concluded that "had developer Pitbull done away with the hazards and just stuck to the driving, Test Drive 4 might have been a decent racer. As it stands, it's just another Need for Speed. And nobody needs that, not even EA." The sensitivity of the controls was cited as a problem by most critics, particularly when driving at high speed. IGN's Jaz Rignall added: "Also, the car's weight-shift response is not fluid, so there's no feeling of feedback -- once you lose control, it's very difficult to avoid spinning out." He said the controls are the one issue which made Test Drive 4 a good, rather than great game: "Had Test Drive 4 been more polished and better refined in the handling department, it would have been close to getting a 9. As it stands, it misses out on an 8 by a whisker."

Kelly Rickards and Kraig Kujawa of EGM and Glenn Rubenstein of GameSpot instead felt what held the game back was that its gameplay is simply too basic and generic to stand out, though Rickards still compared it positively to the Need for Speed series, calling it "the game Need for Speed II should have been." Rickards was among a number of critics who commented positively on the game's clash of modern cars with 1960s muscle cars, its diverse locales, and its drag strip. Rubenstein acknowledged that the drag strip is a unique feature in what he nonetheless maintained is an overall generic game.

The music was another subject of diverse opinions; GamePro called it "engaging and catchy", but Rignall and Rubenstein both deemed it unexciting and remarked that the use of techno music in racing games seemed to be played out. Where Rickards found the deranged, aggressive driving of the A.I. opponents to be annoying, Rignall argued that it presents an interesting and enjoyable challenge. The graphics, too, saw disagreement among critics; EGM and IGN both praised how the car models are highly detailed to the point where they are readily recognizable, while Next Generation contrarily stated that the detailing is poor and the in-race models are conspicuously less impressive than the ones on the car select screen. GamePro was the most impressed with Test Drive 4's graphics, summing up, "Easily one of the most highly detailed, graphically superior PlayStation racers to date, Test Drive 4 verges on perfection at every turn, but never quite takes the trophy." Test Drive 4 received "average" reviews on the PlayStation according to the review aggregation website GameRankings.

== Sequel and legacy ==
Pitbull Syndicate developed a 1998 sequel, Test Drive 5; it features more vehicles and tracks and competed with Need for Speed III: Hot Pursuit. Accolade published Test Drive Off-Road 2 in 1998, which uses a modified version of the Test Drive 4 engine and includes licensed off-road vehicles.
