= Test Drive Cycles =

- Developer: Xantera
- Publisher: Infogrames North America
- Composer: Thor Call
- Series: Test Drive
- Platform: Game Boy Color
- Release: NA: July 25, 2000
- Genre: Racing
- Modes: Single-player, multiplayer

Test Drive Cycles is a racing video game developed by American studio Xantera and published by Infogrames North America exclusively for the Game Boy Color. It is the first game in the Test Drive series to feature motorcycles.

Test Drive Cycles was originally intended to release on PlayStation, Dreamcast and Microsoft Windows, but was eventually cancelled.

== Gameplay ==
Unlike other Test Drive games by Xantara, which were isometric, Test Drive Cycles is instead an "into-the-screen" style racer, in the vein of Hang-On or Out Run.

The game has 24 tracks in 12 real world locations. There are eleven motorcycles in the game, licensed from BMW, Harley-Davidson, Moto Guzzi and Bimota. Two of these are only available in the police chase mode.

== Reception ==
Reception

Aggregate score
Aggregator	Score
GameRankings	60%

Review scores
Publication	Score
AllGame	4/5
Electronic Gaming Monthly	3.5/10
GameSpot	7.3/10
IGN	4/10
Nintendo Power	6.1/10

Test Drive Cycles received "mixed" reviews according to the review aggregation website GameRankings.

Michael Wolf of Daily Radar criticized the audio and draw distance, and stated that the controls felt "sluggish". Wolf did remark that the upgrade system and police chase mode were welcome features, but did not consider them enough to off-set its issues.

== Cancelled console/PC version ==
Versions were also developed for PlayStation, Dreamcast and PC by the same development team who worked on Test Drive Off-Road 3, but these versions were cancelled in June 2000.

The PlayStation version was to include 30 licensed bikes, 12 tracks and DualShock controller support with the same applying to the Dreamcast version which would support a Jump Pak. The Microsoft Windows version would also include hidden shortcuts.
