= TDOR =

TDOR may refer to:

- Test Drive Off-Road, a video racing game
- Transgender Day of Remembrance, a day designated for the memory of transgender hate crime victims
- Tennessee Department of Revenue
