= Test Drive Unlimited Solar Crown =

2024 open world racing game

- Standard Edition cover art featuring the Mercedes-AMG G 65 and the Porsche Taycan Turbo S Cross Turismo
- Developer: KT Racing
- Publisher: Nacon
- Directors: Guillaume Guinet; Alain Jarniou
- Series: Test Drive
- Platforms: PlayStation 5; Windows; Xbox Series X/S
- Release: WW: 12 September 2024
- Genre: Racing
- Modes: Single-player, multiplayer

Test Drive Unlimited Solar Crown is a 2024 online racing video game developed by KT Racing and published by Nacon. It is the twenty-first installment in the Test Drive series, the first title in the series since 2012's Ferrari Racing Legends, and the third game in the franchise's Unlimited reboot, following 2011's Test Drive Unlimited 2. The game was initially teased on 3 July 2020 via Twitter and was officially unveiled during the Nacon Connect event on 7 July.

Test Drive Unlimited Solar Crown was released for PlayStation 5, Windows, and Xbox Series X/S on 12 September 2024. A Nintendo Switch version was previously announced but never released, and versions for PlayStation 4 and Xbox One were initially announced but were canceled during development in favor of their more powerful successors. The game received mixed reviews, citing lackluster gameplay, poor driving physics, poor optimization for the PC version and the required use of a constant internet connection to play, which wasn't a requirement for its two predecessors.

== Development ==
In December 2016, it was reported that French publisher Bigben Interactive (now called Nacon) had acquired the Test Drive intellectual property from Atari, with plans to reboot the franchise. In 2018, Bigben announced the acquisition of French game developer Kylotonn, with Roman Vincent, president of Kylotonn, suggesting they were working on the next installment of Test Drive.

In April 2020, Nacon filed a trademark with the UK Intellectual Property Office for Test Drive Solar Crown, with the last two words referring to the Solar Crown in-universe racing competition series featured in 2011's Test Drive Unlimited 2.

The game features a 1:1 recreation of Hong Kong Island, as revealed in a trailer released on 6 July 2021 during Nacon Connect 2021. Unlike its two predecessors, set on Oʻahu and Ibiza, the roads include left-hand traffic, a first for the series since The Brotherhood of Speed's depictions of Tokyo and London. The game offers 550 kilometres (340 miles) of drivable roads, as stated on the Steam news hub for the game. Creative director Alain Jarniou, who worked on the first two Test Drive Unlimited games, stated in the Nacon Connect 2020 showcase that Test Drive Unlimited Solar Crown had only been in development for "several months" by that time. Game director Guillaume Guinet stated that the project began in 2016, with production starting in 2018.

According to game director Guillaume Guinet, Test Drive Unlimited Solar Crown is intended to compete with Forza series, The Crew series, and the upcoming Grand Theft Auto VI.

== Release ==
On 3 July 2020, the official Test Drive Twitter account tweeted a twelve-second video clip featuring a crown-shaped logo with the letters "SC," announcing a full reveal during the Nacon Connect video event on 7 July. The game was officially announced on that date during the event with a 25-second teaser trailer, with Kylotonn (under their KT Racing brand) serving as the developer.

On 18 May 2022, Nacon and Kylotonn announced on the game's Steam news hub that the release would be delayed to 2023, and the PlayStation 4 and Xbox One versions were canceled to focus on the more powerful hardware of their respective ninth-generation successors—the PlayStation 5 and Xbox Series X and Series S—aiming to improve the overall game quality. In July 2023, it was announced that the game would be postponed again to 2024.

On 30 May 2024, the official Nacon YouTube account announced the game's release date as 12 September 2024. On 29 August 2024, Nacon and KT Racing announced that the second season of the game will include the Spanish town of Ibiza, which previously appeared along with the rest of the island of Ibiza in Test Drive Unlimited 2, is available on 24 December 2024.

== Reception ==
Reception

Aggregate scores
Aggregator	Score
Metacritic	(PC) 52/100 (PS5) 55/100 (XSXS) 55/100
OpenCritic	6% recommend

Review scores
Publication	Score
Eurogamer	DE: 3/5; GB: 2/5; PT: 3/5
Hardcore Gamer	3/5
HobbyConsolas	60/100
IGN	Adria: 3/10; US: 5/10
PCGamesN	4/10
Push Square	6/10
Video Games Chronicle	3/5
Gamereactor	7/10
Pure Xbox	5/10

Test Drive Unlimited Solar Crown received "mixed or average" reviews from critics, according to review aggregator website Metacritic, and only 6% of critics recommended the game according to OpenCritic.
