= Test Drive: Off-Road Wide Open =

2001 video game

- North American PlayStation 2 box art featuring the 2001 Hummer H1 (foreground) and the 2001 Ford F-150 (background)
- Developer: Angel Studios
- Publisher: Infogrames
- Series: Test Drive
- Platforms: PlayStation 2, Xbox
- Release: PlayStation 2: NA: August 21, 2001; PAL: November 30, 2001; Xbox: NA: November 15, 2001; EU: May 24, 2002; AU: May 31, 2002
- Genre: Racing
- Modes: Single-player, multiplayer

Test Drive: Off-Road: Wide Open (known simply as Off-Road: Wide Open in Europe) is a racing video game developed by Angel Studios and published by Infogrames for PlayStation 2 and Xbox. It is the first game in the Test Drive series to be developed for the sixth generation of gaming systems, and the fourth and final installment of the Off-Road series. Trucks from General Motors make a full return as playable vehicles after being sort of absent in Test Drive: Off-Road 3.

== Gameplay ==
Test Drive: Off-Road: Wide Open, like the previous installments, focuses on off-road racing and utilizes three-dimensional graphics.

The player has a choice of off-road vehicles from manufacturers such as Hummer, Jeep, Ford, and others. Each vehicle has several variants that differ from each other in appearance and characteristics (climbing ability, top speed, acceleration, and handling): Stock, Modified, Pro, and Unlimited (the last two are unlocked during the game). Each car can be repainted. There is an option to shift weight, which enables to adjust the position of the car while in mid-air. The PlayStation 2 version includes a multiplayer mode with a split-screen for two players and the Xbox version for up to four players. In addition, the Xbox version includes more off-road vehicles.

The game features four modes. In "Single Race," the player chooses a difficulty level (easy, medium, or hard), a track, and an off-road vehicle, and must place first among the eight opponents to win. "Career Race" is a single-player mode that includes tournaments, in which the player earns the money needed to buy new vehicles. In "Free Ride", the player can explore one of three locations; Moab, Utah, Yosemite Park, and Hawaii. "Stadium Race" is a mode available only in the Xbox version, in which competition takes place on special enclosed tracks.

== Development and release ==
Test Drive: Off-Road: Wide Open was announced on October 19, 2000. Angel Studios, known for another off-road racing game, Smuggler's Run, was responsible for development. The new game was the first in the Test Drive series to be released on PlayStation 2 and Xbox and was the last installment of the Off-Road sub-series. The game was shown at E3 2001. In the making, the graphics, controls, and game modes were greatly improved. Test Drive: Off-Road: Wide Open was based on the Angel Game Engine (AGE) used in previous games from Angel Studios. The soundtrack includes songs from Metallica, Fear Factory, and others.

It was released on August 21, 2001, on PlayStation 2 and November 15 on Xbox in North America. The game was released in Europe and Australia under the shortened title Off-Road: Wide Open for PlayStation 2 on November 23, 2001, and for Xbox in 2002 on May 24 and May 31, respectively.

== Reception ==
Reception

Aggregate score
Aggregator	Score	
Aggregator	PS2	Xbox
Metacritic	70/100	64/100

Review scores
Publication	Score	
Publication	PS2	Xbox
AllGame	N/A	2/5
Electronic Gaming Monthly	5.67/10	N/A
Game Informer	(Nov.) 6.25/10 (Sept.) 3.5/10	6.5/10
GamePro	4.5/5	4/5
GameRevolution	B−	C+
GameSpot	7.6/10	6.8/10
GameSpy	68%	71%
GameZone	7.3/10	8/10
IGN	6.5/10	7/10
Next Generation	3/5	2/5
Official U.S. PlayStation Magazine	3/5	N/A
Official Xbox Magazine (US)	N/A	5.6/10
Maxim	8/10	N/A

Test Drive: Off-Road: Wide Open received "mixed or average reviews" on both platforms according to the review aggregation website Metacritic.

Kristian Brogger of Game Informer initially gave the PlayStation 2 version a bad review in the September 2001 issue, stating that the graphics were poor and the sounds were so bad because of bugs in the game. However, he raised the grade up to an average review in the November 2001 issue, saying that the game was "certainly leagues better without the infamous bug, but the game itself still seems to suffer from an attack of mediocre gameplay syndrome."

Jim Preston of NextGen's November 2001 issue called the same console version "An all-too-familiar entry in the Test Drive series, but there's fun to be had." However, in its final issue, the magazine called the Xbox version "a flat and uninspired game, and it certainly can't compare to the large collection of stellar Xbox launch titles."
