= Test Drive 2001 =

2000 video game

- Developer(s): Xantera
- Publisher(s): Infogrames
- Programmer(s): Mike Crandall
- Composer(s): H. Kingsley Thurber; Carson Dalton
- Series: Test Drive
- Platform(s): Game Boy Color
- Release: NA: November 28, 2000
- Genre(s): Racing
- Mode(s): Single-player, multiplayer

Test Drive 2001 is a racing video game developed by American studio Xantera and published by Infogrames exclusively for Game Boy Color. It is the last game in the series to be available on Game Boy Color, and the last on a Nintendo platform in general.

== Reception ==
Reception

Review scores
Publication	Score
AllGame	13.5/25 (Note: AllGame awarded the game 2/5 for graphics, 3/5 for sound, 2.5/5 for enjoyment, 3/5 for replay value, and 3/5 for documentation.)
IGN	6/10
Nintendo World	5.8/10

Writing for IGN, Craig Harris gave the game a 6/10, praising the multiplayer and handling improvements over Test Drive 6, but criticizing track design and the decision to add traffic. Club Nintendo lauded the visual details, like the Hollywood sign in the Los Angeles track, and Mardi Gras signs in New Orleans.

Daily Radar's Michael Wolf was indifferent on the game, praising its content and Cop Chase mode, but expressing frustration with the low speed and unimpressive graphics.
