= Pitbull Studio =

British video game development company

Pitbull Studio Limited
- Type: Private
- Industry: Video games
- Founded: 2010; 16 years ago
- Founder: Robert Troughton
- Defunct: 5 August 2014
- Fate: Merged into Epic Games UK
- Headquarters: Houghton-le-Spring, England

Pitbull Studio Limited was a British video game developer based in Houghton-le-Spring, England, with additional offices in Guildford and Leamington Spa.

== History ==
Pitbull Studio was formed in 2010, a year after the collapse of Midway Studios – Newcastle. Initially working on motion tracking games for the health sector, the studio later won a contract to help develop Unreal Engine 4 with Epic Games.

On 5 August 2014, Epic Games announced that Pitbull Studio would effectively be merged into a new development entity, Epic Games UK.

== Games developed ==
Year	Game	Platform(s)
2010	Circus Challenge	Microsoft Windows
2011	BigTopTHD	Android
2012	Silent Hill: Downpour	Xbox 360
2013	Gears of War: Judgment	Xbox 360
