= Test Drive 5 =

1998 video game

- PAL PlayStation cover art featuring the 1998 Aston Martin V8 Vantage V600 (foreground) and the 1997 TVR Cerbera Speed 6 (background)
- Developer: Pitbull Syndicate
- Publisher: Accolade
- Composer: Steven M. Allison
- Series: Test Drive
- Platforms: PlayStation, Windows
- Release: PlayStation: NA: 7 October 1998; UK: 6 November 1998; Windows: NA: 18 November 1998
- Genre: Racing
- Modes: Single-player, multiplayer

Test Drive 5 is a racing game developed by Pitbull Syndicate and published by Accolade for PlayStation and Windows in 1998, and by Capcom in Japan in 1999.

== Development ==
Accolade spent $3 million on a television advertising campaign for Test Drive 5 and Test Drive Off-Road 2.

== Reception ==
Reception

Aggregate score
Aggregator	Score	
Aggregator	PC	PS
GameRankings	61%	71%

Review scores
Publication	Score	
Publication	PC	PS
AllGame	N/A	2.5/5
CNET Gamecenter	4/10	4/10
Computer Games Strategy Plus	1.5/5	N/A
Computer Gaming World	1.5/5	N/A
Electronic Gaming Monthly	N/A	7/10
Famitsu	N/A	26/40
Game Informer	N/A	8.25/10
GamePro	4/5 (Note: GamePro gave the PC version 3.5/5 for graphics, 4.5/5 for sound, and two 4/5 scores for control and overall fun factor.)	4.5/5 (Note: GamePro gave the PlayStation version two 4.5/5 scores for graphics and overall fun factor, 3.5/5 for sound, and 4/5 for control.)
GameRevolution	N/A	D+
GameSpot	6.2/10	6.3/10
IGN	7.8/10	7.5/10
Official U.S. PlayStation Magazine	N/A	3.5/5
PC Accelerator	4/10	N/A
PC Gamer (US)	81%	N/A

Test Drive 5 received "mixed" reviews on both platforms according to the review aggregation website GameRankings. In Japan, where the PlayStation version was ported and published by Capcom on 25 March 1999, Famitsu gave it a score of 26 out of 40.

James Mielke of GameSpot said of the PS version: "In the end, when you think of all the other games that Test Drive 5 tries to emulate, you're thinking of at least three other racing games that you should purchase before you go for this one. While not a dismal failure by any means, the cheap AI and unbalanced gameplay ensure that Test Drive 5 remains rental material at best." Michael E. Ryan, also of GameSpot, criticized various aspects of the PC version, writing, "while the game is a decent arcade racer with great graphics, plenty of cars, and a ton of tracks, it simply falls short of its number one competitor - EA's Need for Speed III - in almost every conceivable way."

Trent C. Ward of IGN said the PC version was "blessed with solid graphics, great sound, and some of the finest cars ever included in a racing game." However, Ward felt that the game's computer-controlled racers were capable of maneuvers not possible for the player to perform: "When you're racing, if another car pulls up behind you and taps you on the rear bumper, your car immediately goes flying out of control. While this seems reasonable (if a tad excessive), the same trick just doesn't work if you try to do it back. Shove an opponent's car from behind, and you're a lot more likely to end up in the ditch than he is. [...] The way it is, the most you'll get is about three or four races before the computer pulls a dirty trick so foul that you'll turn your computer off in disgust." Ward concluded that Test Drive 5 "comes really close to greatness, and then veers off sharply at the last minute. The game's solid handling, great car selection, and passable graphics are all ruined by the fact that computer-controlled cars can pitch you off the road at any given moment and by the fact that even with the fastest cars at your disposal, you'll probably find yourself struggling to keep up with the slowest computer opponents." Craig Harris, also of IGN, praised the PS version's sound effects and music, as well as its multiplayer mode, and called its graphics "a step up from Test Drive 4." Harris wrote: "The graphics engine is very smooth, very crisp, and very fast. My major complaint is, though the physics of the cars on the road are pretty accurate (as far as I can tell, anyway), when these cars take to the air, either by a jump or crash, it's like the tires are filled with pure helium."

The PC version was nominated for the "Best Racing Game of the Year" award at IGN's Best of 1998 Awards, which went to Powerslide.
