= Test Drive 4X4 =

1998 video game

Test Drive 4X4 Test Drive Off-Road 2
- North American PlayStation cover art featuring a 1998 Hummer H1
- Developers: Accolade; Pitbull Syndicate
- Publisher: Accolade
- Producers: Monte Singman(Executive Producer); Allen Edwards
- Programmers: Derrick Yim; Owen Flatley; Darrell Dennies; Gary Strawn
- Series: Test Drive
- Platforms: PlayStation, Microsoft Windows
- Release: PlayStation: NA: 23 October 1998; EU: 1999; JP: 8 April 1999; Windows: NA: 11 November 1998
- Genre: Racing
- Modes: Single-player, multiplayer

Test Drive 4X4 (known as Test Drive Off-Road 2 in North America) is a racing video game co-developed by Accolade's internal development team and Pitbull Syndicate, and published by Accolade for PlayStation and Microsoft Windows.

== Development ==
The game was announced in late 1997. Test Drive 4x4 uses the Test Drive 4 engine and includes licensed off-road vehicles. Accolade spent $3 million on a television advertising campaign for Test Drive 5 and Test Drive Off-Road 2.

== Reception ==
Reception

Aggregate score
Aggregator	Score	
Aggregator	PC	PS
GameRankings	50%	66%

Review scores
Publication	Score	
Publication	PC	PS
AllGame	2/5	2.5/5
Computer Games Strategy Plus	2/5	N/A
Computer Gaming World	1/5	N/A
Electronic Gaming Monthly	N/A	6.125/10
Famitsu	N/A	25/40
Game Informer	N/A	6.5/10
GamePro	N/A	3.5/5
GameRevolution	N/A	F
GameSpot	4.8/10	6.1/10
IGN	4.5/10	5.8/10
PC Accelerator	4/10	N/A
PC Gamer (US)	27%	N/A
PlayStation: The Official Magazine	N/A	4/5

The game received "mixed" reviews on both platforms according to the review aggregation website GameRankings. In Japan, where the PlayStation version was ported and published by Capcom on 8 April 1999, Famitsu gave it a score of 25 out of 40.
