= Test Drive Unlimited =

2006 video game

- PAL region cover art featuring the Lamborghini Gallardo (left) and the Ford GT (right)
- Developers: Eden Games (Xbox 360 & Windows); Atari Melbourne House (PS2 & PSP)
- Publisher: Atari
- Directors: Stéphane Beley; Frédéric Jay; Pierre-Arnaud Lambert
- Producers: Ahmed Boukhelifa; Christophe Laboureau
- Composers: Gan Juan; Richard Aitken
- Series: Test Drive
- Platforms: Xbox 360; PlayStation 2; Windows; PlayStation Portable
- Release: 5 September 2006: Xbox 360; NA: 5 September 2006; EU: 8 September 2006; AU: 21 September 2006 PlayStation 2, Windows; EU: 16 March 2007; NA: 20 March 2007; AU: 13 April 2007 (PS2) PlayStation Portable; NA: 21 March 2007; EU: 30 March 2007; AU: 27 April 2007
- Genre: Racing
- Modes: Single-player, multiplayer

Test Drive Unlimited is a 2006 racing video game developed by Eden Games for Xbox 360 and Windows, with Atari Melbourne House developed the PlayStation 2 and PlayStation Portable versions, and published by Atari. Being the eighteenth entry in the Test Drive series, Unlimited serves as a reboot of the franchise, discarding the continuity of the previous games. The game features over 125 licensed sports cars and motorcycles and the terrain is modeled after the Hawaiian island of Oʻahu that features over 1,000 miles (1,600 km) of roads and highways.

It was followed by a sequel, Test Drive Unlimited 2, in 2011. A third game and soft reboot, Test Drive Unlimited Solar Crown, was released in 2024.

== Gameplay ==
In the online world of Test Drive Unlimited, players are able to drive both on-road and off-road in free-roam mode, challenging other players in real-time anywhere on the drivable map. It is also possible to drive on small islands outside of the main island. The Xbox 360 version has supported steering wheel controllers since launch. Following the third free update, Test Drive Unlimited supports force feedback wheel controllers such as Microsoft's Xbox 360 Wireless Racing Wheel.

The roads are modeled after satellite images of the island of Oʻahu. There is a spectrum of different terrains including rain forests, mountains, sandy beaches and urbanized areas (featuring the city of Honolulu).

=== Single-player game ===
The game begins by purchasing a car and a house. The player is then free to explore the island; as this happens, key locations on the map are revealed.

=== Multiplayer game ===
Spyker C8 Spyder in Test Drive Unlimited (PC)

The multiplayer component (branded as M.O.O.R. or Massively Open Online Racing) works as an extra layer on top of the single-player game: all activities available in single-player are also available in multiplayer. On Xbox 360, Eden Games was allowed to add unique features to the Xboxlive in order to bring a new seamless Online experience.

The following challenges are also available in multiplayer only:

- Race against other players
- Challenge players to complete tasks
- Attempt other player challenge

Custom services, added to the XboxLive by Eden Games:

- Unique Free Roaming system.
- ETrade system : Players can buy and sell their cars.
- Drive-In : Player can Edit its own track, do its best time and publish it to a Drive-In spot and challenge other players to beat him in a lapse of time with participation fee. The best player wins the lot.
- Live Island map : Allow players to set filters, see other players updates and join their game sessions
- In Game news system, using live notifications
- Clan system + Intra and Inter Clan matchmaking

Online services for Test Drive Unlimited were shut down on September 29, 2012

== Special NPCs in PlayStation 2 version ==
There were 1500 total beta testers in Atari's closed beta for Test Drive Unlimited for PlayStation 2. At the end of the testing period, Atari awarded 30 of the most active testers with "immortality" in the PlayStation 2 version of Test Drive Unlimited. These 30 beta testers were allowed to name one of the non-playable characters (NPC) in the game. Some chose to use their first and last name; others chose to use their screen names. These 30 special NPCs can be found spread throughout the virtual island of only the PlayStation 2 version. Atari and Melbourne House ensured the Beta Testers were given prominent positions as NPCs. Among the play testers were also friends and family of staff at Melbourne House, including staff members themselves, who are included within the different motoring clubs featured within the game. Most were granted President or Vice President status in the car clubs and were put in highly desirable performance cars.

== Development ==
Beginning development circa 2003, the game's budget was between $15 million and $25 million.

== Reception ==
Reception

Aggregate score
Aggregator	Score			
Aggregator	PC	PS2	PSP	Xbox 360
Metacritic	79/100	75/100	80/100	82/100

Review scores
Publication	Score			
Publication	PC	PS2	PSP	Xbox 360
Edge	N/A	N/A	N/A	8/10
Electronic Gaming Monthly	N/A	N/A	N/A	8.5/10
Eurogamer	N/A	9/10	N/A	8.5/10
Famitsu	N/A	N/A	N/A	34/40
Game Informer	N/A	N/A	N/A	8.35/10
GameRevolution	N/A	N/A	N/A	B+
GameSpot	8.5/10	7.5/10	8.7/10	8.5/10
GameSpy	3.5/5	5/5	N/A	4/5
GameTrailers	N/A	N/A	N/A	8.5/10
GameZone	8.5/10	8.5/10	8/10	8.8/10
IGN	8/10	7.3/10	7.8/10	8/10
Official Xbox Magazine (US)	N/A	N/A	N/A	8.5/10
PC Gamer (US)	80%	N/A	N/A	N/A
PlayStation: The Official Magazine	N/A	8/10	8.5/10	N/A
The Sydney Morning Herald	N/A	N/A	N/A	4/5
The Times	N/A	N/A	N/A	4/5

Test Drive Unlimited received "generally favorable" reviews, according to review aggregator website Metacritic.

411Mania gave the Xbox 360 version a score of 8.6 out of 10 and stated: "Even if you own a next-gen racing game, this is a title that you MUST try out. This is such an open ended game that never actually ends ala [sic] World of Warcraft and feeling like you're a part of the Island with your homes, vehicles and club is too much of a cool thing to pass up." The Sydney Morning Herald gave the same version a score of four stars out of five and called it "a car aficionado's paradise and a novel concept in driving games. Unlimited's online world is certain to be mimicked." The Times also gave it four stars out of five and claimed that it "comes closer than most games to re-creating the freedom of real life." In Japan, where the Xbox 360 version was ported and published by Microsoft on 26 April 2007, Famitsu gave the game a score of 34 out of 40.

The Academy of Interactive Arts & Sciences nominated Test Drive Unlimited for "Racing Game of the Year" at the 10th Annual Interactive Achievement Awards.
