= Test Drive: Off-Road =

1997 video game

Test Drive Off-Road
- PAL cover art featuring a 1997 Hummer H1
- Developer: Elite Systems
- Publishers: NA: Accolade; EU: Eidos Interactive
- Series: Test Drive
- Platforms: Microsoft Windows, PlayStation
- Release: NA: 27 March 1997; EU: July 1997 (PS)
- Genre: Racing
- Modes: Single-player, multiplayer

Test Drive Off-Road is a racing video game developed by Elite Systems and published by Accolade for Microsoft Windows and PlayStation.

== Gameplay ==
There are two different play modes: Class Racing, in which only vehicles of one type race, and Unlimited, in which all types of vehicles compete.

== Reception ==
Reception

Review scores
Publication	Score	
Publication	PC	PS
AllGame	N/A	2/5
Computer Games Strategy Plus	2/5	N/A
Computer Gaming World	2/5	N/A
Electronic Gaming Monthly	N/A	7.5/10
Famitsu	N/A	23/40
Game Informer	N/A	5.25/10
GameSpot	6.3/10	6/10
Next Generation	2/5	N/A
PC Gamer (US)	64%	N/A

Test Drive: Off-Road received mixed reviews on both platforms. Next Generation reviewed the PC version of the game, stating that "all in all, TDOR doesn't muster up to the competition. Not by a long shot".

Reviewing the PlayStation version, Kraig Kujawa of Electronic Gaming Monthly praised the use of real vehicles and complexity of the tracks, while criticizing the small selection of vehicles. His co-reviewer Dean Hager said the game has a sufficient mixture of intensity and realism, but many of the tracks become repetitive and the competitors are not challenging enough. Both concluded it to be the most acceptable of the "hordes of mediocre off-road racing titles [that] have been coming out recently". While GamePro complimented the realistic engine sounds and soundtrack, it had a more negative overall assessment, summarizing that "Test Drive: Off-Road's loose controls, aggravating pop-up problems, and uninspired gameplay stall its overall appeal". Greg Kasavin of GameSpot said of the PC version, "Test Drive: Off Road is pure arcade action". Jeff Kitts, also from GameSpot, said of the PlayStation version, "Test Drive: Off Road is an acceptable entry in the suddenly crowded field of off-road racing games". In Japan, where the PS version was ported for release under the title Gekitotsu! Yonku Battle (激突！四駆バトル, Gekitotsu! Yonku Batoru) and published by Coconuts Japan on 31 July 1997, Famitsu gave it a score of 23 out of 40.

As of March 1998 the game sold over 500,000 copies.

== Sequel ==
Accolade stated in a press release that the commercial successes of the game and Test Drive 4 caused Test Drive to become the top-selling racing series at the time. Accolade published Test Drive Off-Road 2 in 1998, which uses the Test Drive 4 engine and includes licensed off-road vehicles.
