= Test Drive: Eve of Destruction =

2004 video game

- North American cover art
- Developer: Monster Games
- Publisher: Atari, Inc.
- Series: Test Drive
- Platforms: PlayStation 2, Xbox
- Release: PlayStation 2: NA: August 24, 2004; AU: September 24, 2004; EU: November 26, 2004; Xbox: NA: August 24, 2004; KR: 2004
- Genres: Racing, vehicular combat
- Modes: Single-player, multiplayer

Test Drive: Eve of Destruction (released as Driven to Destruction in Europe) is a 2004 racing video game developed by Monster Games and published by Atari, Inc. for Xbox and PlayStation 2. The game has many North American races that include a figure 8 race, last man standing race, school bus races, demolition derby, and many more.

== Development ==
The game was announced in April 2004, and PlayStation 2 and Xbox versions were announced in April and June 2004, respectively, eventually releasing simultaneously on August 24, 2004. The PlayStation 2 version was then released in Australia on September 24, 2004, and in the United Kingdom on November 26, 2004.

== Reception ==
Reception

Aggregate score
| Aggregator | Score | |
| Aggregator | PS2 | Xbox |
|---|---|---|
| Metacritic | 73/100 | 72/100 |

Review scores
| Publication | Score | |
| Publication | PS2 | Xbox |
|---|---|---|
| Electronic Gaming Monthly | 6.67/10 | 6.67/10 |
| Game Informer | 7.75/10 | 7.75/10 |
| GamePro | 4.5/5 | N/A |
| GameSpot | 6.8/10 | 6.8/10 |
| GameSpy | 3/5 | 3/5 |
| GameZone | 8.3/10 | 7.2/10 |
| IGN | 6.5/10 | 6.5/10 |
| Official U.S. PlayStation Magazine | 4/5 | N/A |
| Official Xbox Magazine (US) | N/A | 8.3/10 |
| X-Play | 3/5 | N/A |
| Maxim | 8/10 | 8/10 |

Test Drive: Eve of Destruction received "average" reviews on both platforms according to the review aggregation website Metacritic.
