= Test Drive =

Racing video game series

- Genre: Racing
- Developers: Distinctive Software (1987-89); Accolade/Infogrames North America (1990, 99); Elite Systems (1997); Pitbull Syndicate (1997-99, 2002); Xantera (1999–2000); Eutechnyx (2000); Velez & Dubail (2000); Infogrames/Atari Melbourne House (2000-02, 07); Eden Games (2000, 06-11); Digital Illusions CE (2000); Angel Studios (2001); Monster Games (2004); Slightly Mad Studios (2012); KT Racing (2022-)
- Publishers: Accolade/Infogrames North America (1987–2000); Electronic Arts (1987–88); Pony Canyon (1989); Cryo Interactive (1999); Infogrames (2000–2002); Atari (2004-11); Rombax Games (2012); Nacon (2022-)
- Platforms: Amiga, Amstrad CPC, Atari ST, Commodore 64, MS-DOS, Apple II, PC-98, Apple IIGS, MSX, ZX Spectrum, Sega Genesis, SNES, Microsoft Windows, PlayStation, Game Boy Color, Dreamcast, PlayStation 2, Xbox, Xbox 360, PlayStation Portable, PlayStation 3, PlayStation 5, Xbox Series X/S, Nintendo Switch
- First release: Test Drive; 1987
- Latest release: Test Drive Unlimited Solar Crown; September 12, 2024

Test Drive is a series of racing games that were originally published by Accolade until they were bought by Infogrames, which later turned into Atari. The first game was released in 1987 and has since been followed by several sequels and spin-offs, the latest of which was released in 2024 and is the first by Nacon after purchasing the franchise from Atari.

== Gameplay ==
Gameplay of Test Drive 4

In Test Drive, the player typically uses one of several exotic performance cars to race to a finish line against opponents or in a time limit, while avoiding traffic and police.

=== Unlimited series ===
Test Drive Unlimited includes an open world environment and allows for the purchase of houses, cars and character customisation.

== History ==
=== Early titles (1987–1991) ===
In 1987, Accolade published Test Drive as a computer game worldwide, while Electronic Arts released the game in the United Kingdom. The quality of the Amiga, Atari ST, Commodore 64, and DOS ports differ from each other. The Amiga version's detailed visuals and audio realistically depicted the game's racing theme, while its Atari ST counterpart used simplified graphics and sound effects. The Commodore 64 and DOS ports were of similar quality to the Amiga version. The gameplay was kept intact for all platforms.

Test Drive was a commercial success, with sales having surpassed 250,000 copies by November 1989. It received generally positive reviews from video game critics. Computer Gaming World stated in 1987 that Test Drive "offers outstanding graphics and the potential to 'hook' every Pole Position fan". Compute! praised the excellent graphics and sound, but noted that the game only had one course. The game was reviewed in 1988 in Dragon #132 by Hartley, Patricia, and Kirk Lesser in "The Role of Computers" column. The reviewers gave the game 4 1/2 out of 5 stars.

Test Drive spawned several sequels and spin-offs. Distinctive Software developed its 1989 sequel, The Duel: Test Drive II, using several software libraries. Distinctive (as Unlimited Software, Inc.) used the aforementioned software libraries for an MS-DOS port of Outrun, resulting in the Accolade v. Distinctive lawsuit. Distinctive Software won, so the rights to make the Test Drive games without the source code transferred to Accolade. The court also found that Accolade had failed to demonstrate that the balance of hardships was in its favor. Another sequel, Test Drive III: The Passion, was developed and published by Accolade in 1990.

=== Revival series (1997–2004) ===
After a few years of the franchise being in dormancy, in 1997 Accolade revived the franchise with brand new titles. The first of these was Test Drive: Off-Road, an off-road truck racing spinoff, and Test Drive 4, the first video game developed by Pitbull Syndicate.

In 1998, Pitbull Syndicate developed two further Test Drive titles, Test Drive 4X4 (also known as Test Drive Off-Road 2), a sequel to the Test Drive: Off-Road spinoff, and Test Drive 5; both games were the two last entries in the series to be published by Accolade.

In April 1999, Accolade was acquired by French video game company Infogrames for a combined sum of US$60 million, US$50 million of which in cash and US$10 million in growth capital, and was renamed Infogrames North America, Inc. The company chief executive officer, Jim Barnett, was named head of Infogrames Entertainment's American distribution subsidiary. As a result, Test Drive 6 was the first game in the series to be published by the newly named Infogrames North America in 1999. An in-house team at Infogrames North America would go onto develop Test Drive Off-Road 3 in 1999, and would also go to develop Test Drive Cycles, which was cancelled in June 2000 with the exception of the Game Boy Color version.

In 2000, due to copyright problems between Infogrames North America and Infogrames Multimedia over the Test Drive trademark, Cryo Interactive picked up publishing rights to Test Drive 6 in Europe for a May 2000 release, while Infogrames Multimedia released Test Drive Off-Road 3 under the name of 4x4 World Trophy in April 2000. Around this time, Infogrames North America released Le Mans 24 Hours and the Dreamcast version of V-Rally 2 under the localised names of Test Drive Le Mans and Test Drive V-Rally respectively. A Nintendo 64 localisation of Michelin Rally Masters: Race of Champions known as Test Drive Rally was also planned, but this was cancelled in February 2000. Fellow Game Boy Color titles included Test Drive Cycles and Test Drive 2001, an update to the GBC version of Test Drive 6.

In November 2001, the last entry in the Off-Road subseries - Test Drive Off-Road Wide Open, known in Europe simply as Off-Road Wide Open, was released on the PlayStation 2, being developed by Angel Studios. An Xbox port was released a year later with additional content and graphic improvements.

In May 2002, Infogrames released TD Overdrive: The Brotherhood of Speed (released as Test Drive in North America), the last entry in the series to be developed by Pitbull Syndicate and the first one to feature a storyline.

The next game in the series, Test Drive: Eve of Destruction, was developed by Monster Games in 2003, and was released in 2004. The game was released in Europe under the name of Driven to Destruction.

=== Unlimited series (2006–present) ===
Test Drive Unlimited, released in 2006 for Xbox 360, and in 2007 for Windows, PlayStation 2, and PlayStation Portable, features an open world modeled after the Hawaiian island of Oʻahu. Its sequel Test Drive Unlimited 2 was released in 2011 and includes both Oʻahu and the Spanish island of Ibiza.

A spin-off title called Test Drive: Ferrari Racing Legends was developed by Slightly Mad Studios and published by Rombax Games under license from Atari, in celebration of the 65th anniversary of Italian sports car manufacturer Ferrari, featuring Formula One, sports cars, and rally cars. The game was heavily based upon technology developed for Shift 2: Unleashed, and shares little with the Unlimited series.

In 2016, French publisher Bigben Interactive (later renamed Nacon) acquired the Test Drive intellectual property from Atari, with plans to revive the franchise. In 2018, Bigben acquired French racing game developer Kylotonn, with Roman Vincent, president of Kylotonn suggesting they were working on the next installment of Test Drive.

In April 2020, Nacon filed a trade mark to the Intellectual Property Office for Test Drive Solar Crown, the last two words referring to the Solar Crown in-universe racing competition series featured in Test Drive Unlimited 2. The full title of the next game in the series is Test Drive Unlimited Solar Crown. The Kylotonn-developed game would feature a 1:1 recreation of Hong Kong Island and later expanded to Ibiza.

== Games ==
Year	Title	Developer	Publisher	Platforms	Notes
1987	Test Drive	Distinctive Software	Accolade	Amiga, Atari ST, Commodore 64, MS-DOS, Apple II, PC-98	Apple II and PC-98 ports were released in 1988 and 1989, respectively.
1989	The Duel: Test Drive II	Distinctive Software	Accolade	Amiga, Amstrad CPC, Apple IIGS, Commodore 64, MS-DOS, MSX, ZX Spectrum, Atari ST, Sega Genesis, SNES	Sega Genesis and SNES ports were released in 1992
1990	Test Drive III: The Passion	Accolade	Accolade	MS-DOS	
1997	Test Drive: Off-Road	Elite Systems	Accolade, Eidos Interactive	MS-DOS, PlayStation	
1997	Test Drive 4	Pitbull Syndicate	Accolade	PlayStation, Microsoft Windows	
1998	Test Drive 5	Pitbull Syndicate	Accolade	PlayStation, Microsoft Windows	
1998	Test Drive 4X4	Accolade, Pitbull Syndicate	Accolade, Electronic Arts	PlayStation, Microsoft Windows	Titled Test Drive Off-Road 2 in North America.
1999	Test Drive 6	Pitbull Syndicate	Infogrames North America; Cryo Interactive	PlayStation, Microsoft Windows, Dreamcast	Published by Cryo Interactive in PAL regions. Dreamcast version was not released in Europe
1999	Test Drive 6	Xantera	Infogrames North America; Cryo Interactive	Game Boy Color	Published by Cryo Interactive in PAL regions. Dreamcast version was not released in Europe
1999	Test Drive: Off-Road 3	Infogrames North America	Infogrames North America, Infogrames Multimedia	Microsoft Windows, PlayStation	Titled 4X4 World Trophy in PAL regions.
1999	Test Drive: Off-Road 3	Xantera	Infogrames North America, Infogrames Multimedia	Game Boy Color	Titled 4X4 World Trophy in PAL regions.
2000	Test Drive Le Mans	Eutechnyx	Infogrames	PlayStation, Microsoft Windows	North American localisation of Le Mans 24 Hours. The later-released PlayStation 2 and Microsoft Windows versions were released under the original game name
2000	Test Drive Le Mans	Velez & Dubail	Infogrames	Game Boy Color	North American localisation of Le Mans 24 Hours. The later-released PlayStation 2 and Microsoft Windows versions were released under the original game name
2000	Test Drive Le Mans	Infogrames Melbourne House	Infogrames	Dreamcast	North American localisation of Le Mans 24 Hours. The later-released PlayStation 2 and Microsoft Windows versions were released under the original game name
2000	Test Drive V-Rally	Eden Studios	Infogrames	Dreamcast	North American localisation of V-Rally 2: Expert Edition.
2000	Michelin Rally Masters: Race of Champions	Digital Illusions CE	Infogrames	Microsoft Windows, PlayStation	A Nintendo 64 port was in development under the title Test Drive Rally but was canceled.
2000	Test Drive Cycles	Xantera	Infogrames	Game Boy Color	A Windows, PlayStation and Dreamcast version was developed but was cancelled in June 2000.
2000	Test Drive 2001	Xantera	Infogrames	Game Boy Color	Updated version of the Game Boy Color version of Test Drive 6.
2001	Test Drive: Off-Road Wide Open	Angel Studios	Infogrames	PlayStation 2, Xbox	Titled Off-Road Wide Open in PAL regions.
2002	TD Overdrive: The Brotherhood of Speed	Pitbull Syndicate	Infogrames	PlayStation 2, Xbox, Microsoft Windows	Titled simply Test Drive in North America.
2004	Test Drive: Eve of Destruction	Monster Games	Atari	Xbox, PlayStation 2	Titled Driven to Destruction in PAL regions.
2006	Test Drive Unlimited	Eden Games	Atari	Xbox 360, Microsoft Windows	
2006	Test Drive Unlimited	Atari Melbourne House	Atari	PlayStation 2, PlayStation Portable	
2011	Test Drive Unlimited 2	Eden Games	Atari	Microsoft Windows, PlayStation 3, Xbox 360	
2012	Test Drive: Ferrari Racing Legends	Slightly Mad Studios	Rombax Games	PlayStation 3, Xbox 360, Microsoft Windows	
2024	Test Drive Unlimited Solar Crown	KT Racing	Nacon	Microsoft Windows, Nintendo Switch, PlayStation 5, Xbox Series X/S	
