= Le Mans 24 Hours (video game) =

1999 video game

- North American Dreamcast cover art featuring the 1999 #10 Audi Sport Team Joest R8C
- Developers: Eutechnyx (PS, PC); Velez & Dubail (GBC); Infogrames Melbourne House (DC, PS2 & PC remake)
- Publisher: Infogrames (Note: The 2002 PC version was released under the Atari brand name)
- Series: Test Drive
- Platforms: PlayStation, Microsoft Windows, Game Boy Color, Dreamcast, PlayStation 2
- Release: 26 November 1999: PlayStation; EU: 26 November 1999; NA: 4 May 2000 Windows; NA: 29 March 2000; EU: 1 August 2000 Game Boy Color; NA: 27 June 2000; EU: 14 December 2000 Dreamcast; NA: 8 November 2000; EU: 25 October 2000 PlayStation 2; EU: 15 June 2001; NA: 21 August 2001 Windows (remake); EU: 24 May 2002; NA: 1 June 2002
- Genre: Racing
- Modes: Single-player, multiplayer

Le Mans 24 Hours (Note: Test Drive Le Mans in North America (except for PS2 and second PC version)) is a video game released for the PlayStation, Game Boy Color, Dreamcast, PlayStation 2, and Microsoft Windows (in two versions of the latter, one developed by Eutechnyx, like with the PlayStation version and the second version being a port of the Melbourne House version ported by Torus Games). The Dreamcast version was ported and published by Sega in Japan on 15 March 2001, while the PlayStation 2 version was ported and published by the same company on 13 June. Based on the famous 24 hours of Le Mans race in France, the player is invited to race the entire 24-hour endurance course or take part in a simpler arcade mode. The game also featured tracks such as Bugatti Circuit, Brno Circuit, Road Atlanta (PlayStation 2 version only), Suzuka Circuit, Donington Park and Circuit de Catalunya, as well as a weather and night system.

== Reception ==
Reception

Aggregate scores
Aggregator	Score				
Aggregator	Dreamcast	GBC	PC	PS	PS2
GameRankings	90%	75%	(1) 68% (2) 67%	70%	76%
Metacritic	93/100	N/A	(2) 60/100	N/A	75/100

Review scores
Publication	Score				
Publication	Dreamcast	GBC	PC	PS	PS2
CNET Gamecenter	9/10	7/10	(1) 3/10	6/10	N/A
Computer Gaming World	N/A	N/A	(2) 2.5/5 (1) 1.5/5	N/A	N/A
Electronic Gaming Monthly	9.17/10 (Note: In Electronic Gaming Monthly's review of the Dreamcast version, two critics gave it each a score of 9.5/10, and the other gave it 8.5/10.)	N/A	N/A	7/10 (Note: In Electronic Gaming Monthly's review of the PlayStation version, two critics gave it each a score of 7.5/10, and the other gave it 6/10.)	8/10 (Note: Three critics of Electronic Gaming Monthly gave the PlayStation 2 version each a score of 8/10.)
EP Daily	N/A	N/A	(1) 7/10	6.5/10	9/10
Eurogamer	N/A	N/A	(1) 8/10	N/A	N/A
Game Informer	4.75/10	N/A	N/A	3.75/10	8.5/10
GameRevolution	B+	N/A	N/A	N/A	B−
GameSpot	9.6/10	8.1/10	(1) 6.7/10 (2) 6.1/10	6.2/10	8.2/10
GameSpy	9/10	N/A	N/A	N/A	65%
IGN	9.4/10	7/10	(1) 7.5/10 (2) 6/10	6.5/10	8/10
Next Generation	5/5	N/A	N/A	N/A	3/5
Nintendo Power	N/A	6.6/10	N/A	N/A	N/A
Official U.S. PlayStation Magazine	N/A	N/A	N/A	2.5/5	2.5/5
PC Gamer (US)	N/A	N/A	(2) 55% (1) 53%	N/A	N/A

The Dreamcast version received "universal acclaim", and the PlayStation 2 version received "generally favourable reviews", while the PC version of Le Mans 24 Hours received "mixed" reviews, according to the review aggregation website Metacritic. Chris Charla of NextGen said of the Dreamcast version in its January 2001 issue, "It's no hardcore sim, but it may be the best reproduction of the actual feel of marathon racing ever." Ten issues later, however, Gary Whitta said of the PlayStation 2 version, "While Le Mans 24 Hours has the chops to keep circuit-based racing fans satisfied for more than a few laps, it's nothing new."

Cheat Monkey of GamePro said of the PlayStation version, "You've seen better from the Test Drive series, but hardcore racing fans might want to give Le Mans a try--that is when they've totally played out their copies of Gran Turismo or Need for Speed." (Note: GamePro gave the PlayStation version 3/5 for graphics, 3.5/5 for sound, and two 2.5/5 scores for control and fun factor.) Four-Eyed Dragon later said of the PlayStation 2 version, "The visuals and sound are the major sore spots of Le Mans. The graphics are grainy and not very sharp, especially when you're driving at night or in the rain. The soundtrack consists of poor crowd noises and out-of-tune music. Sadly, even the solid controls can't save Le Mans from straying off course." (Note: GamePro gave the PlayStation 2 version two 3/5 scores for graphics and fun factor, 2/5 for sound, and 4.5/5 for control.)

Robert Howarth of GameFan gave the PC version of Test Drive Le Mans 85%, saying that it "offers above-average graphics, great controls and good artificial intelligence, as well as realistic tracks and cars all based on the 24 hours of Le Mans endurance race. Though its visuals are marred with some minor texture rendering problems on some systems, overall, its fast speed and sharp controls make Test Drive: Le Mans a game worth picking up for any hard-core racing enthusiast." Lupos of GameZone gave the same PC version six out of ten, saying, "I think if you are an avid fan of Le Mans, you will enjoy this game. It's not terrible. It's stable. You could probably get the steering wheel to work after a couple emails to Infogrames. You will enjoy doing the 24 hour challenges, racing against authentic teams and drivers, driving the authentic cars, and figuring out the handling on them. But if you just want to play a racing game that has the best physics engine, best graphics, and supports multiplayer, this isn't it." Later, Rita Courtney gave the Dreamcast version seven out of ten, saying, "This isn't a game that you will get tired of in a hurry! I think the instruction booklet could have had a few more details, but other than that it's a great game and a lot of fun!" Kevin Krause gave the PlayStation 2 version 7.8 out of 10, saying, "Overall, Le Mans 24 Hours is entertaining and possibly worth purchasing if you're looking for something a little different than most racing titles. Don't think that it comes without flaw though because it doesn't - it could definitely use some refinement in a few areas." Later, Ovaldog gave the PC version of Le Mans 24 Hours 7.5 out of 10, calling it "a very solid performer that should provide the race fan [with] many hours of racing action."

Nick Woods of AllGame gave the PC version of Test Drive Le Mans four stars out of five, saying, "When all is said and done, Test Drive Le Mans is still a very fun, detailed game that will live up to the standards of racing game fans and critics alike." He later gave the Game Boy Color version three-and-a-half stars out of five, saying, "Taking the good and the bad into account, Test Drive Le Mans ends up being a worthwhile purchase. Game Boy Color owners probably won't find a more gripping racing game for their format." Bryan Melville, however, gave the PlayStation version two-and-a-half stars out of five, calling it "another sub par game in the series."

X-Play gave the Dreamcast version all five stars, saying, "In all, Test Drive Le Mans is the best racing game on the platform, and one of the best of the genre. The low price only helps to make it a must-buy, and there's more than enough game to satisfy any racing fan's hunger. So put on a fresh pot of coffee, get comfortable, and prepare to spend the most time you ever have in a single race." Edge gave the same console version a score of seven out of ten, saying, "an exceptional multiplayer option [...] combined with a massively satisfying singular experience go [sic] a long way to remedy the curtailing price of the official license."

The Dreamcast version won the award for "Best Driving Game" at GameSpot's Best and Worst of 2000 Awards, and was nominated in the "Best Game No One Played" category. The staff argued that the game was "a victim of the Test Drive name, as the Test Drive series is well known for producing large quantities of mediocre driving games—gamers just assumed Le Mans was more of the same."

The PlayStation 2 version was nominated at The Electric Playground's 2001 Blister Awards for "Best Console Driving Game", but lost to Grand Theft Auto III.
