= Midway Studios – Newcastle =

British video game developer

Midway Studios – Newcastle Limited
- Formerly: Pitbull Syndicate (1996–2005)
- Type: Subsidiary
- Industry: Video games
- Founded: 10 December 1996; 29 years ago
- Defunct: 14 July 2009; 17 years ago
- Headquarters: Gateshead, England
- Products: Test Drive series (1997–2002)
- Parent: Midway Games (2005–2009)

Midway Studios – Newcastle Limited (originally The Pitbull Syndicate Limited) was a British video game developer based in Gateshead, England.

== History ==
Pitbull Syndicate was formed in December 1996 by an ensemble of programmers and artists with extensive experience in the video game industry. The company started with a small office in Sunderland, England, and initially employed eight people, working on PC and PlayStation games. Slowly expanding, the company moved to larger offices in Chester-le-Street and later to larger offices in Gateshead. By 2005, its staff had swelled to over 60 people working on PC, PlayStation 2 and Xbox.

In October 2005, the company was sold to Midway Games and were renamed Midway Studios – Newcastle. Prior to that, Pitbull had created the titles L.A. Rush and Rush for Midway. It was Midway's only studio located outside the U.S. and was closed in July 2009 after the sale of most of Midway's assets to Warner Bros. A game called Necessary Force was being developed at the time of the closure. The rights to the game have diverted back to Midway Games as they are shopping the intellectual property. Some members of the team were able to band together and form a new company, Atomhawk Design.

In July 2010, Robert Troughton, founder of Pitbull Syndicate, announced the formation of Pitbull Studio, one year after Midway folded the renamed company. Troughton also said that an unannounced project was in development.

== Games developed ==
=== As Pitbull Syndicate ===
Year	Game	Platform(s)	Publisher
1997	Test Drive 4	Microsoft Windows, PlayStation	Accolade
1998	Test Drive 5	Microsoft Windows, PlayStation	Accolade
1999	Big Air	PlayStation	Accolade
1999	Demolition Racer	Microsoft Windows, PlayStation	Infogrames North America
1999	Test Drive 6	Dreamcast, Game Boy Color, Microsoft Windows, PlayStation	Infogrames North America
2000	Demolition Racer: No Exit	Dreamcast	Infogrames
2002	TD Overdrive: The Brotherhood of Speed	Microsoft Windows, PlayStation 2, Xbox	Infogrames

=== As Midway Studios – Newcastle ===
Year	Game	Platform(s)
2005	L.A. Rush	Microsoft Windows, PlayStation 2, PlayStation Portable, Xbox
2009	Wheelman	Microsoft Windows, PlayStation 3, Xbox 360

== Unauthorized logo used by hate groups ==
In the early 2000s, Pitbull Syndicate's logo was used by several Neo-Nazi groups, most prominently by the Keystone United skinhead group. The Anti-Defamation League has listed this exact pitbull image as a White Supremacist extremist symbol.
