= TD Overdrive: The Brotherhood of Speed =

2002 racing video game

- European Xbox cover art
- Developer: Pitbull Syndicate
- Publisher: Infogrames (Note: Released under the Atari brand name)
- Series: Test Drive
- Platforms: PlayStation 2, Xbox, Windows
- Release: PlayStation 2; NA: 28 May 2002; AU: 28 June 2002; EU: 5 July 2002; Xbox; NA: 11 June 2002; EU: 5 July 2002; AU: 12 July 2002; Windows; NA: 10 December 2002
- Genre: Racing
- Modes: Single-player, multiplayer

TD Overdrive: The Brotherhood of Speed (released in North America as Test Drive) is a racing video game developed by Pitbull Syndicate and published by Infogrames for PlayStation 2, Xbox, and Windows.

== Gameplay ==
Like its previous incarnations, TD Overdrive focuses on illegal street racing, dodging traffic, and evading the police. It also features real-life locations for its tracks: San Francisco, Tokyo, London, and Monte Carlo. A fully playable version of Pong is included in the loading screens. Cars from General Motors make a return after being absent from Test Drive 6. The returning cars may be the same models, though they belong to the same generation and could represent different model years.

This was the first entry in the franchise to feature a story mode in addition to the arcade mode. Players assume the role of Dennis Black, a San Franciscan street racer. Black races in an exclusive street racing club on behalf of another driver named Donald Clark, who was injured during a race against Vasily Raskolnikov, one of the club's most feared drivers. As Black's victories accumulate, he hears rumors from other drivers that Clark is using him to defeat Raskolnikov and win his prized Dodge Viper. After Black wins against Raskolnikov, the rumors are proven true when Clark admits to having used him solely to obtain the Viper. Black then challenges Clark for everything he has gained over his career, including the Viper. After a series of races across all four cities, Black wins, and Clark surrenders the Viper.

== Development ==
The game was initially announced on 16 March 2001, with a planned release in the fall for the PlayStation 2. On 24 April, Infogrames announced that the title would also be released on the Xbox, featuring graphical enhancements over the PS2 version.

Both versions were showcased publicly at E3 2001 and during Infogrames' "Gamer's Day" event on August 8. In August, the game's release date was postponed to the first quarter of 2002.

On September 11, 2001, Infogrames announced that the game would be titled Test Drive Underground, with a planned release in March 2002 for the PlayStation 2. However, the title soon reverted to its original name, and the planned release was missed again. The game was later announced for release under the company's revived Atari brand and went gold in May 2002. The game was released for PlayStation 2 in North America on May 28, 2002, in Australia on June 28, and in the United Kingdom on July 5. It was also released for the Xbox in North America on June 11, 2002, in the United Kingdom on July 5, and in Australia on July 12. A port for Windows was released exclusively in North America on December 10, 2002.

== Reception ==
Reception

Aggregate score
Aggregator	Score		
Aggregator	PC	PS2	Xbox
Metacritic	61/100	73/100	71/100

Review scores
Publication	Score		
Publication	PC	PS2	Xbox
AllGame	N/A	2/5	2/5
Electronic Gaming Monthly	N/A	6.5/10	8/10
Game Informer	N/A	8.5/10	8.5/10
GamePro	N/A	3.5/5	4/5
GameRevolution	N/A	C	C
GameSpot	6.7/10	6.9/10	6.9/10
GameSpy	N/A	83%	72%
GameZone	N/A	7/10	8.3/10
IGN	N/A	7.7/10	7.3/10
Official U.S. PlayStation Magazine	N/A	3.5/5	N/A
Official Xbox Magazine (US)	N/A	N/A	7.2/10
PC Gamer (US)	55%	N/A	N/A
Maxim	N/A	8/10	N/A

Test Drive received "mixed or average reviews" on all platforms according to the review aggregation website Metacritic.
