= Test Drive 6 =

1999 video game

- European PlayStation box art, featuring the 1999 Dodge Viper ACR
- Developers: Pitbull Syndicate; Xantera (Game Boy Color)
- Publishers: NA: Infogrames North America; EU: Cryo Interactive
- Series: Test Drive
- Platforms: PlayStation, Game Boy Color, Microsoft Windows, Dreamcast
- Release: 10 November 1999: PlayStation; NA: 10 November 1999; EU: 30 June 2000 Game Boy Color; NA: 16 November 1999; UK: 13 October 2000 Windows; NA: 17 November 1999; EU: 15 March 2000 Dreamcast; NA: 21 December 1999
- Genre: Racing
- Modes: Single-player, multiplayer

Test Drive 6 is a 1999 racing video game developed by Pitbull Syndicate for PlayStation, Microsoft Windows and Dreamcast. In the United States, the game was published by Infogrames North America, while it was published in Europe by Cryo Interactive. The game features 37 licensed cars, plus four police car variants. As a first for the series, cars from General Motors are not playable in this game due to licensing issues, instead appearing as traffic cars. The soundtrack featured industrial rock and techno music from artists such as Fear Factory, Lunatic Calm and Cirrus.

A Game Boy Color version was developed by Xantera, a small developer that also developed other Test Drive titles for the handheld.

== Gameplay ==
Test Drive 6 is an arcade racing game similar to previous titles in the series. The game features Single Race, "Race Menu" (career) mode and a splitscreen multiplayer mode.

Single race allows players to choose a car and track and play it without any of the requirements or repercussions of career mode. Likewise, this mode has a small selection of cars from all classes available even if the player has not unlocked or purchased them in Race Menu.

The Race Menu career mode allows the player to purchase a vehicle from the Tier 1 dealership and provides them with tournaments to race in, limited by tier. The player wagers in-game currency on each race in the tournament and can receive an extra bonus payout for overall finishing position. Tournaments increase in length, difficulty and payout amounts by tier. The mode also features Stop The Racers and Stop The Bomber modes wherein the player drives a police car in pursuits.

== Game Boy Color version ==
Test Drive 6 was released on a black cartridge for the Game Boy and Game Boy Color. It was developed by Xantara. The handheld version of the game is a RC Pro Am clone. It features a limited selection of licensed vehicles from the main game and tracks named after real-world cities. A sequel was released exclusively for the Game Boy Color in 2000, called Test Drive 2001.

== Reception ==
Reception

Aggregate score
Aggregator	Score			
Aggregator	Dreamcast	GBC	PC	PS
GameRankings	51%	59%	49%	69%

Review scores
Publication	Score			
Publication	Dreamcast	GBC	PC	PS
AllGame	2/5	2.5/5	3.5/5	3/5
CNET Gamecenter	5/10	N/A	5/10	5/10
Computer Gaming World	N/A	N/A	2/5	N/A
Electronic Gaming Monthly	4.125/10 (Note: In Electronic Gaming Monthly's review of the Dreamcast version, one critic gave it 3/10, two others gave it each a score of 4/10, and the other gave it 5.5/10.)	6.5/10	N/A	5.75/10 (Note: Three critics of Electronic Gaming Monthly gave the PlayStation version each a score of 5.5/10, and another gave it 6.5/10.)
Game Informer	8/10	N/A	N/A	7.5/10
GameFan	63%	N/A	N/A	N/A
GameSpot	4.6/10	N/A	4.7/10	5.2/10
GameSpy	4/10	N/A	N/A	N/A
IGN	3.4/10	5/10	6.5/10	6.5/10
Next Generation	2/5	N/A	N/A	N/A
Nintendo Power	N/A	5.9/10	N/A	N/A
Official U.S. PlayStation Magazine	N/A	N/A	N/A	3.5/5
PC Accelerator	N/A	N/A	3/10	N/A
PC Gamer (US)	N/A	N/A	11%	N/A
The Cincinnati Enquirer	N/A	N/A	1/4	N/A

Test Drive 6 received "mixed" reviews on all platforms except the PC version, which received "unfavourable" reviews, according to the review aggregation website GameRankings.

The writers of IGN gave many different opinions to each of the game's system releases. First, David Zdyrko said of the PlayStation version: "After six tries, they still haven't gotten it right." Arun Devidas said of the PC version: "It's not the best racer in town, but Test Drive 6 still has a few redeeming qualities." Craig Harris said of the Game Boy Color version: "Cruising along city streets in real cars should be more fun than this Game Boy racing title." Matt White said of the Dreamcast version: "Infogrames struts their stuff, showing us that they have what it takes to slaughter an innocent game." Jeff Nash of The Electric Playground gave the same Dreamcast version six out of ten, saying that it "offers some cheap thrills with its arcade racing style that may satisfy racers for a short time, but its lack of challenge, technical shortcomings, and unnecessary racing sim qualities make this game only worthy of renting." Nick McElveen of Computer Games Strategy Plus gave the PC version two-and-a-half stars out of five, saying, "While it is not as good as the last two Need for Speeds, Test Drive 6 nevertheless succeeds to some extent at being an enjoyable arcade-style driving game that gets the heart racing, so to speak."

Matt Sammons of NextGen said of the same Dreamcast version: "This strange mix of bumper cars and sports cars is stunningly mediocre. Test before driving."

In one review, Lamchop of GamePro said that the PlayStation version "offers a sweet sampling of exotic cars that you'll probably never own, but it has some stiff competition. Unless you're a hardcore driving nut, this game will eventually take a back seat to Gran Turismo and Need for Speed: High Stakes." (Note: GamePro gave the PlayStation version 3/5 for graphics, two 4/5 scores for sound and control, and 3.5/5 for fun factor in one review.) In another review, iBot said of the same console version: "With all the race games out, picking a game has become very tough. Test Drive 6 packs all of the features you'll want, but it doesn't hold up graphically. If you are a hi-res graphics snob, you might just want to hold out for the Dreamcast version of TD6." (Note: GamePro gave the PlayStation version 3/5 for graphics, 3.5/5 for sound, and two 4/5 scores for control and fun factor in another review.) Dr. Zombie said in one review that the Dreamcast version "will satisfy your need for speed—and for entertainment. The excellent graphics and gameplay, plus the wide assortment of vehicles, tracks, and game modes ensure there's something for racers of all calibers. Don't just Test Drive this hot ride—this game merits a down payment." (Note: GamePro gave the Dreamcast version two 5/5 scores for graphics and fun factor, and two 4.5/5 scores for sound and control in one review.) However, Uncle Dust said of the same console version in another review: "Without breathtaking visuals, but with control problems, Test Drive 6 is not poised to be the leader of the Dreamcast racing pack, and the system desperately needs a good racer. Dreamcast owners should keep holding out for the next big racing title." (Note: GamePro gave the Dreamcast version 4/5 for graphics, and three 3.5/5 scores for sound, control, and fun factor in another review.)
