= Test Drive (1987 video game) =

- Cover art from top to bottom featuring the 1987 Lamborghini Countach, the 1987 Lotus Esprit Turbo, the 1987 Chevrolet Corvette C4, the 1987 Porsche 911 Turbo, and the 1987 Ferrari Testarossa
- Developer: Distinctive Software
- Publishers: Accolade: WW: Accolade; UK: Electronic Arts; JP: Pony Canyon
- Designers: Mike Benna; Don Mattrick; Kevin Pickell; Brad Gour; Bruce Dawson; Amory Wong; Rick Friessen
- Programmers: Mike Benna; Don Mattrick; Kevin Pickell; Brad Gour; Bruce Dawson; Amory Wong; Rick Friessen
- Artists: Tony Lee; John Boechler
- Composer: Patrick Payne
- Series: Test Drive
- Platform: Amiga: Apple II; Atari ST; Commodore 64; MS-DOS; PC-98
- Release: 1987: Amiga, Atari ST, C64, MS-DOS; WW: 1987 Apple II; NA: 1988 PC-98; JP: 1989
- Genre: Racing
- Mode: Single-player

Test Drive is a racing video game developed by Distinctive Software and published by Accolade, released in 1987 for the Amiga, Atari ST, Commodore 64, and MS-DOS, and in 1988 for the Apple II. It was ported to the PC-98 in 1989. It is the first game in the Test Drive series.

== Gameplay ==
The player driving the Lotus Esprit Turbo in Test Drive

The player chooses one of five supercars (Lamborghini Countach, Lotus Esprit Turbo, Chevrolet Corvette C4, Porsche 911 Turbo (930), or Ferrari Testarossa) to drive on a winding cliffside two-lane road while avoiding traffic and outrunning police speed traps. The course's five stages are separated by gas station pit stops.

== Release ==
In 1987, Accolade published Test Drive worldwide, and Electronic Arts imported it to the United Kingdom. The quality of the Amiga, Atari ST, Commodore 64, and MS-DOS ports differs from each other. The Amiga version's detailed visuals and audio realistically depicted the game's racing theme, while its Atari ST counterpart used simplified graphics and sound effects. The Commodore 64 and MS-DOS ports were of similar quality to the Amiga version.

== Reception ==
In late 1989, Video Games & Computer Entertainment reported that over 400,000 copies were sold.

The game received generally positive reviews from video game critics. Computer Gaming World stated in 1987 that Test Drive "offers outstanding graphics and the potential to 'hook' every Pole Position fan". David M. Wilson reviewed the game for the magazine in 1988, stating that "there may be more competitive racing games on the market, but this game combines the enjoyment of driving five of the most exotic sports cars in the world with outrunning 'Smokies' on mountain highways. What more could a race car junkie (or arcade fan) ask for?!" Compute! praised the excellent graphics and sound but noted that the game only had one course. The game was reviewed in 1988 in Dragon #132 by Hartley, Patricia, and Kirk Lesser in "The Role of Computers" column. The reviewers gave the game 4 1/2 out of 5 stars.

== Legacy ==
Test Drive spawned several sequels and spin-offs. Distinctive Software developed its 1989 sequel, The Duel: Test Drive II.
