= Dodge Viper (SR II) =

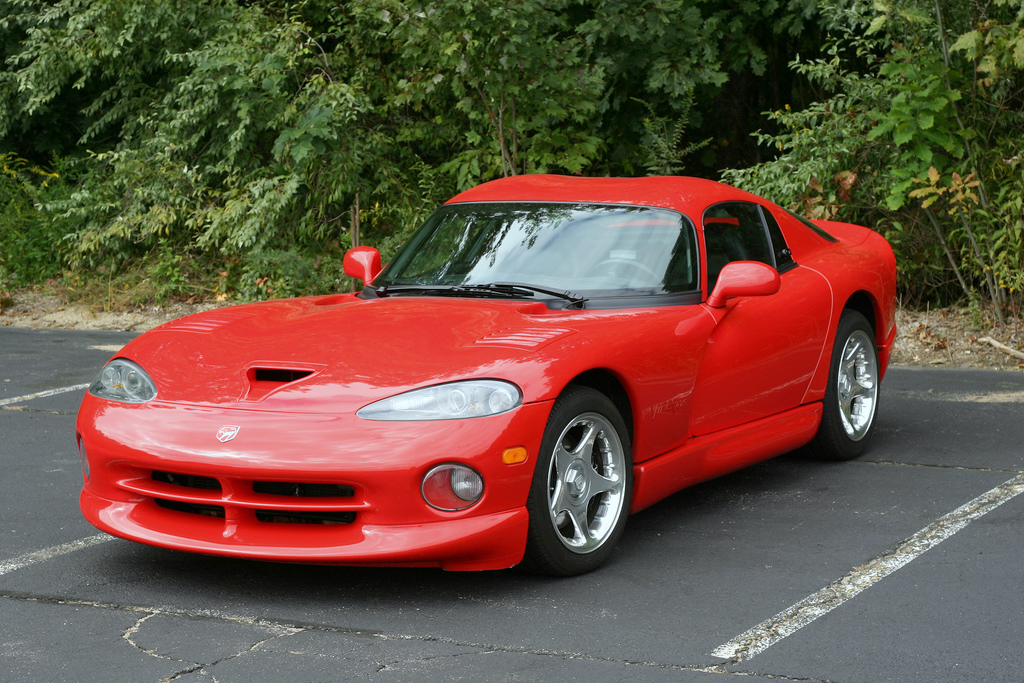
- 1996 Dodge Viper GTS

Overview
- Also called: Chrysler Viper (Europe)
- Production: 1995–2002; 10,422 units
- Model years: 1996–2002
- Assembly: Conner Avenue Assembly, Detroit, Michigan, United States
- Designer: Tom Gale (1990)

Body and chassis
- Class: Sports car (S)
- Body style: 2-door liftback coupé (GTS); 2-door roadster (RT/10)

Powertrain
- Engine: 8.0-liter (488.1 cu in) odd-firing Viper EWB V10
- Power output: RT/10 (1996–1997): 415 hp (309 kW; 421 PS); RT/10 (1998–2002) and GTS: 450 hp (340 kW; 460 PS); GTS-R GT2 Championship Edition (1998) and ACR (1999–2002): 460 hp (343 kW; 466 PS)
- Transmission: 6-speed BorgWarner T56 manual

Dimensions
- Wheelbase: 2,446 mm (96.3 in)
- Length: RT/10: 4,450 mm (175.2 in); GTS: 4,490 mm (176.8 in)
- Width: 1,920 mm (75.6 in)
- Height: RT/10: 1,120 mm (44.1 in); GTS: 1,190 mm (46.9 in)
- Curb weight: RT/10: 1,505 kg (3,318 lb); GTS: 1,531 kg (3,375 lb)

Chronology
- Predecessor: Dodge Viper (SR I)
- Successor: Dodge Viper (ZB I)

The Dodge Viper (SR II) is the second-generation Dodge Viper sports car, manufactured by American automobile manufacturer Dodge. Two versions of the Viper were produced during the second generation. The RT/10, which had many parts carried over from the previous generation during the initial year of production and a new coupe named the GTS which was introduced in mid-1996.

== Production and specification history ==
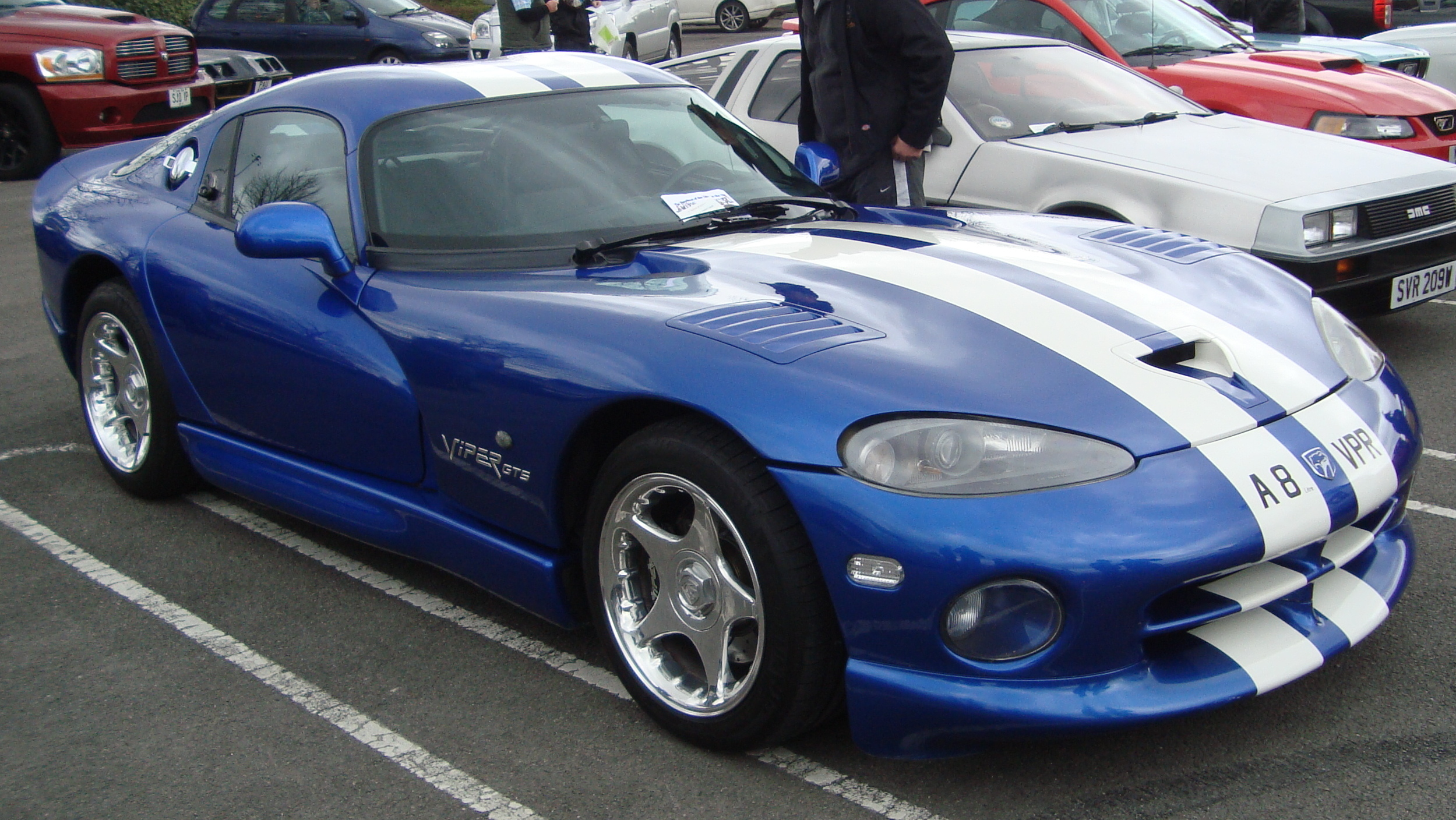
1998 Dodge Viper GTS

The 1996 model year marked as the start of production for the second-generation Viper, codenamed the SR II. The car was essentially an updated version of the first-generation Viper, since most of its parts were carried over to this generation.

The second-generation RT/10 received minor changes, the biggest change being the exhaust position. The side-exiting exhaust pipes were now enclosed and relocated to exit the rear of the vehicle via a single muffler, exiting through two large centrally-positioned tail pipes. This reduced back pressure which increased the power to 415 hp (309 kW; 421 PS) and the torque to 488 lb⋅ft (662 N⋅m). A removable hardtop was now available along with a sliding glass window. A few steel suspension components were replaced by aluminum, which resulted in 27 kg (60 lb) of weight reduction.

In late 1996, a new model of the Viper was introduced. Known as the GTS, the car was a coupé version of the RT/10 and offered more power than the RT/10 upon release. Dubbed the “double bubble”, the roof of the car featured slightly raised sections over the driver and passenger seats that looked like bubbles to accommodate additional head room for helmets during track days. This look was retained for all of the subsequent generations of Viper coupes following the SR II. Over 90% of the GTS contained new parts compared to the RT/10 despite similar looks, and the 8.0-liter V10 engine received a power increase, with the engine now producing a maximum power output of 450 hp (336 kW; 456 PS). The GTS was also the first Viper to receive airbags.

In 1997 and 1998 model years the Viper would continue to receive minor updates. The GTS would get second-generation airbags, revised exhaust manifolds, and a revised camshaft for 1997, and the RT/10 would gain a power increase up to 450 hp (336 kW; 456 PS) for 1998.

Lighter hypereutectic pistons and factory frame improvements were made for the Viper in 2000, as well as another camshaft revision. The lighter pistons, being of cast construction, are not able to safely withstand high levels of forced induction compared to the earlier forged pistons. This difference has led to enthusiasts sometimes referring to the 2000-02 model years as "creampuff cars".

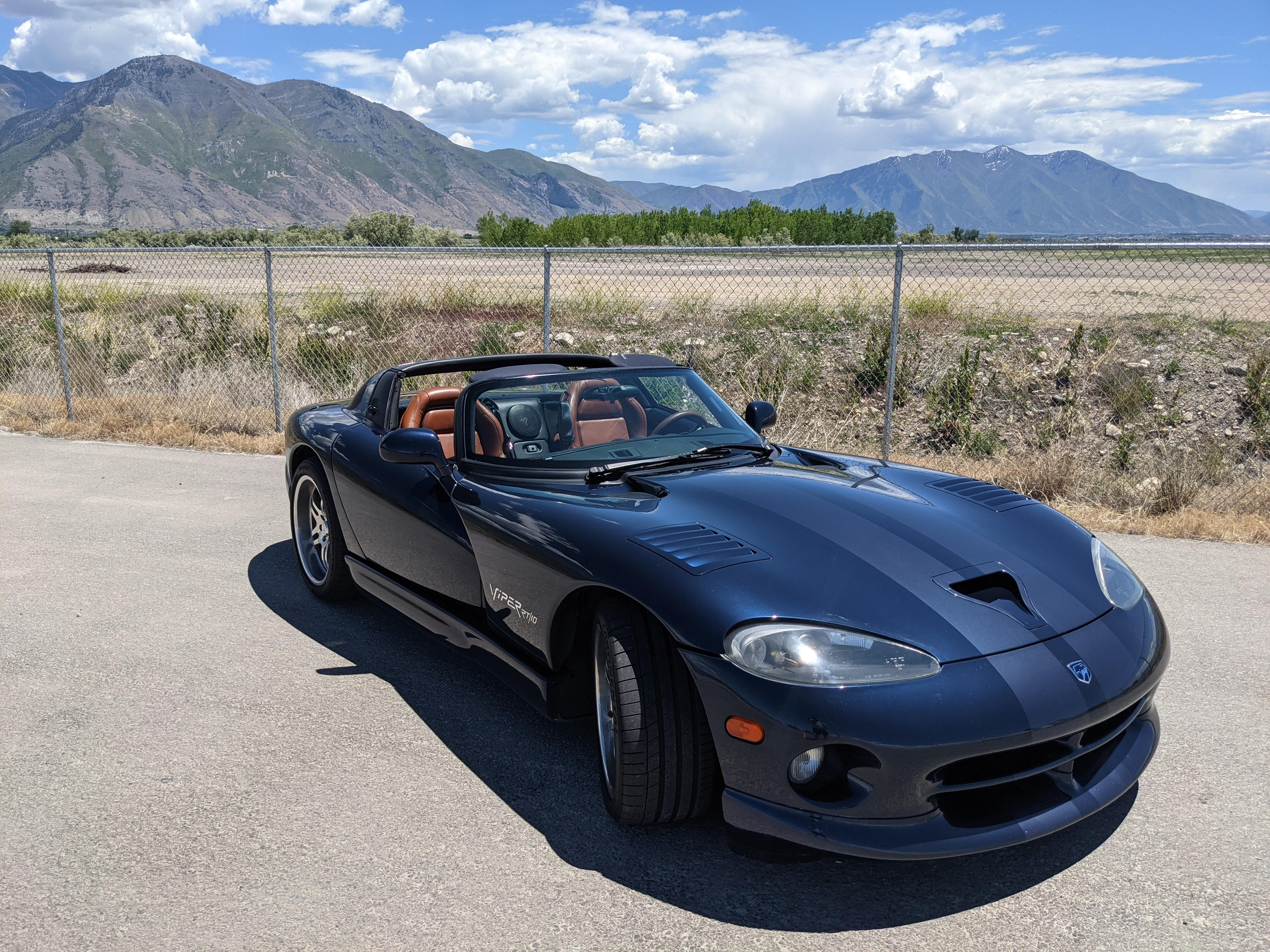
2001 Viper R/T 10 with Cognac interior option

In 2001, the Viper was equipped with an anti-lock braking system as well as revised front brakes.

Colors would vary throughout the second generation. Dodge would offer three or four colors per model year. Some colors such as steel gray were only offered for one model year (MY2000) while other colors such as red were offered during the entire second generation. Interior colors and wheel options would also vary throughout the second generation. The 1999 model year introduced the Connolly "Cognac" interior option. The cobalt blue color of the Dodge Viper GTS seen in the Viper (TV series) was exclusively available to the series.

Stripes would be an option beginning in 1996. The GTS stripes were larger, fuller stripes than the stripes offered on the 1996 RT/10. The GTS had twin stripes (8 inches wide with a 4-inch gap in between) that ran from the front bumper all the way through the rear bumper. 1996 was the only model year in which the stripes would run through the rear license plate area. Stripes on later models would run from front to rear but did not run through the rear license plate area.

=== Performance testing ===
Hot Rod Magazine test results in December 1997:

- 0-30 mph (48 km/h): 1.6 seconds
- 0-60 mph (97 km/h): 4.3 seconds
- 0-80 mph (129 km/h): 6.6 seconds
- 0-100 mph (161 km/h): 9.1 seconds
- 0-120 mph (193 km/h): 13.5 seconds
- 0-1/4 mi (400 m): 12.4 sec at 115.0 mph
- 30–120 mph (48–193 km/h): 11.9 seconds

== Special editions ==
=== ACR ===
The Viper ACR was introduced in 1999, as an optional performance package. The package included a revised air intake, deletion of the air conditioning and Alpine audio system, adjustable suspension, and a supplemental five-point restraint system. The car also included unique one-piece forged-aluminum 18-inch BBS wheels along with interior updates and power windows. Air conditioning and an audio system could be added as part of the optional Comfort Group package. With the revised intake, the ACR had a power output of 460 hp (343 kW; 466 PS) and 500 lb⋅ft (678 N⋅m) of torque. Car and Driver measured a 0-60 mph (97 km/h) time of 4.3 seconds, a quarter mile time of 12.6 seconds at 114 mph (183 km/h), and roadholding of 0.96 g on a 300 ft skidpad.

=== GT2 Champion Edition ===
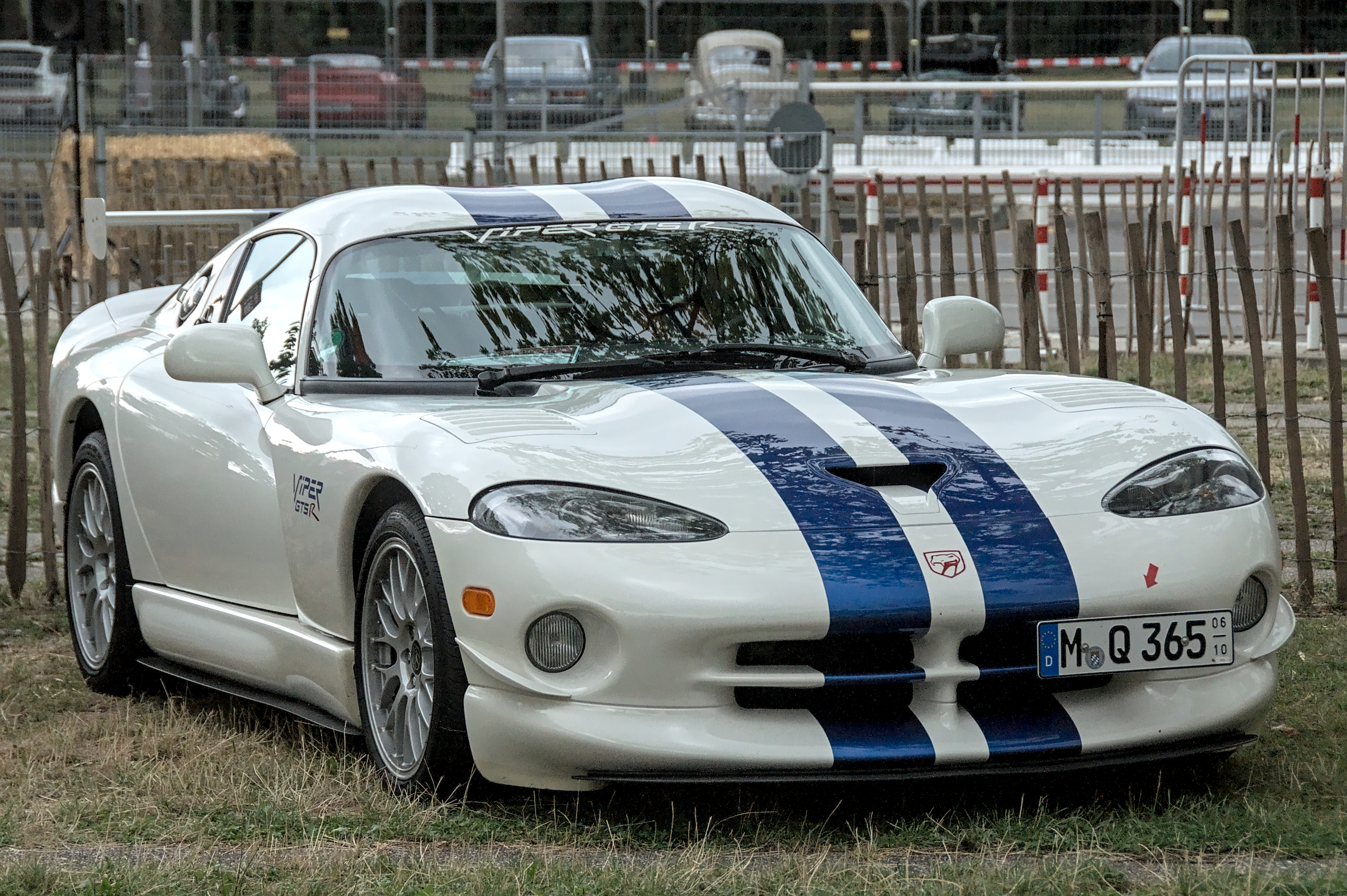

In order to commemorate the car's 1997 FIA GT Championship GT2 class win, Dodge built the Viper GT2 Champion Edition, a special edition taking the name of its racing counterpart's class. The V10 engine in the GT2 model was rated at a power output of 460 hp (343 kW; 466 PS) and 500 lb⋅ft (678 N⋅m). The bodywork was made similar to that of the Chrysler Viper GTS-R, including the colors, aerodynamics package, and visual design in order to publicize the Viper's motorsport achievement. 100 cars were produced. Contrary to popular belief, the car was not built to meet any homologation requirements, as the race car came first.

== Motorsport ==
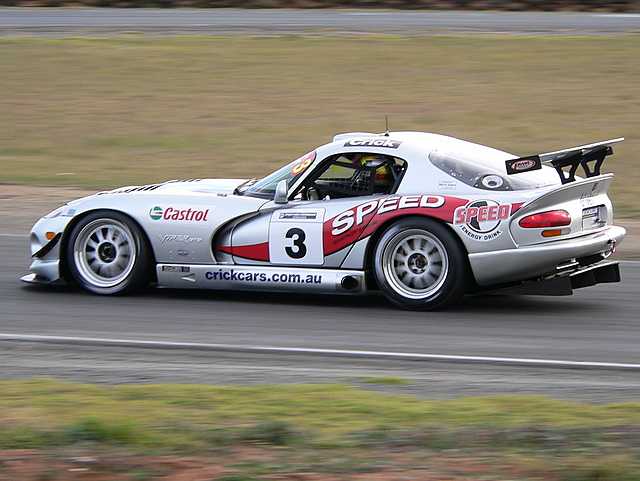
The Dodge Viper GTS-ACR race car, built by Greg Crick to compete in the 2006 Australian GT Championship.

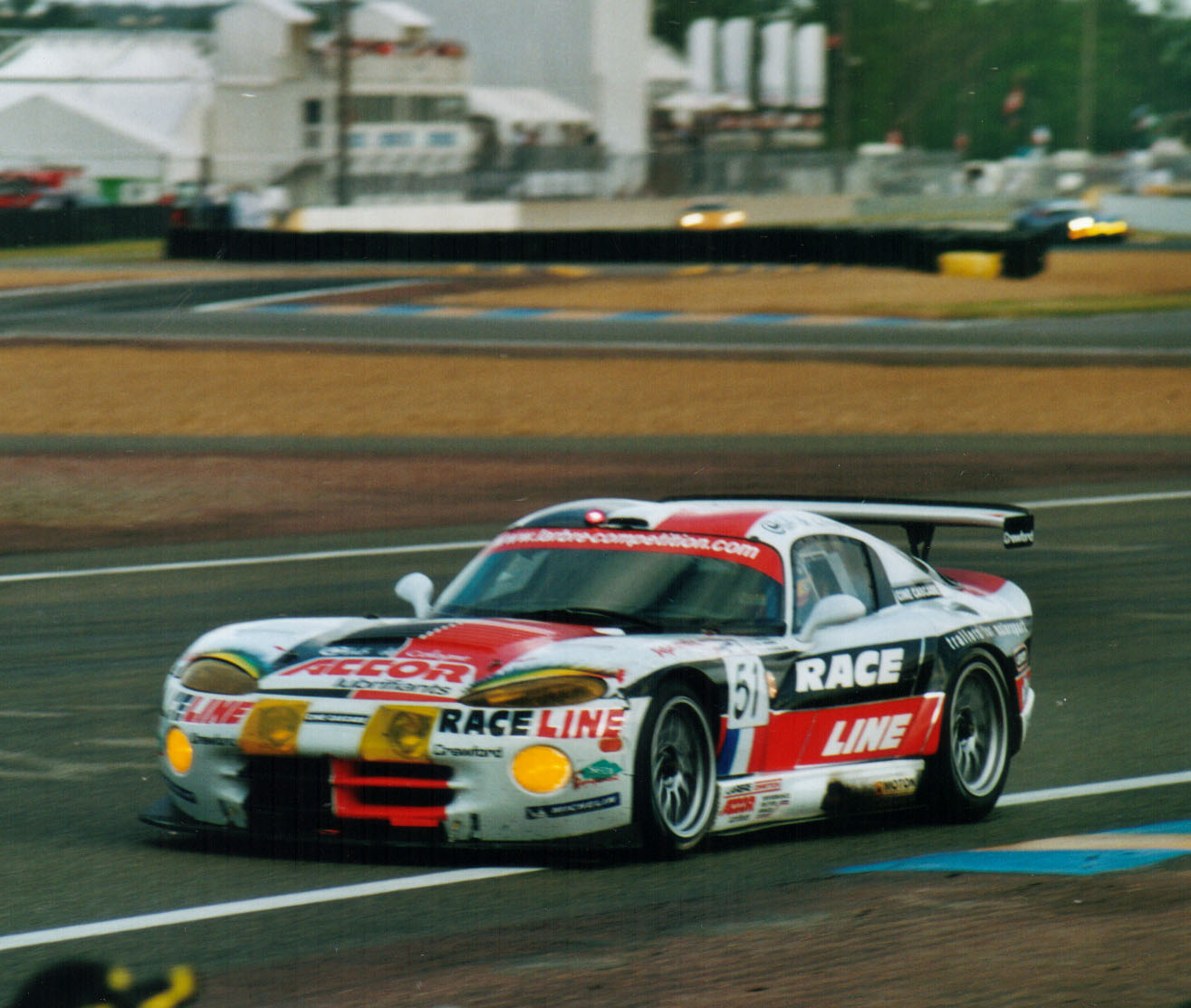
Chrysler Viper GTS-R, also called Dodge Viper GTS-R in North America.

In 1996, Dodge constructed a race car along with English racing team Reynard Motorsport and French racing team Oreca for GT class in LeMans called the Viper GTS-R. The result would end up in a race car that would race 12 years in motorsport with 163 wins in 262 races completed.

The car was unveiled in the same year at the IMSA GT Championship, with racing team Canaska Southwind. Competing in the GTS-1 class (the highest of classes at the time), its first race was at the 24 Hours of Daytona, with a finish at the 29th position. It would fare much better in the following races, finishing at 12th position at the 12 Hours of Sebring. The team would switch to GTS-2 afterwards however, after achieving no further improvements.

Oreca and Canaska Southwind entered the 24 Hours of Le Mans, with three of the four entrants finishing the race, the Canaska Southwind car performing the best at the 10th place. Both teams would return to their respective series, Oreca concluding the year with an eighth place at Brands Hatch, ninth at Spa, and sixth at Nogaro in the BPR Global GT Series, and Canaska Southwind concluding their season second in class at Mosport and sixth overall.

For 1999 and 2000, Oreca expanded greatly, racing in both the ALMS and FIA GT Championship series respectively, earning them nine wins, one of them won by a racing team ran by Paul Belmondo. Oreca would win the championships. Meanwhile, at the FIA GT Championship, a team named Chamberlain had improved to finish second overall.

Oreca would go on to win their second consecutive win later at the 24 Hours of Le Mans, with the top six positions in every class being taken by various GTS-Rs driven by Oreca and other teams. Oreca would leave the series in 1999, in favour of the ALMS, leaving the privateers to race there. The remaining Viper racing teams were still competitive with four race wins, but they would lose to the Lister racing teams, and their Lister Storm race cars, with them winning five races.

The GTS-R would make its first appearance in the FFSA GT Championship, and would see the first overall win for Zakspeed in the 24 Hours of Nürburgring. The three other teams DDO, ART, and MMI teams would win a total of eight victories.

In 2003, the winning ways of the GTS-R would fade away, as the dominance of the Prodrive-built Ferrari 550 GTS race cars would rise. 2004 oversaw the Viper GTS-R begin to phase out, and the car would eventually diminish entirely from competition by 2007 and 2008.

A modified Dodge Viper GTS-ACR driven by Greg Crick under the team Crickcars.com entered the 2006 Australian GT Championship and won the series, with 713 points in total.

== Gallery ==
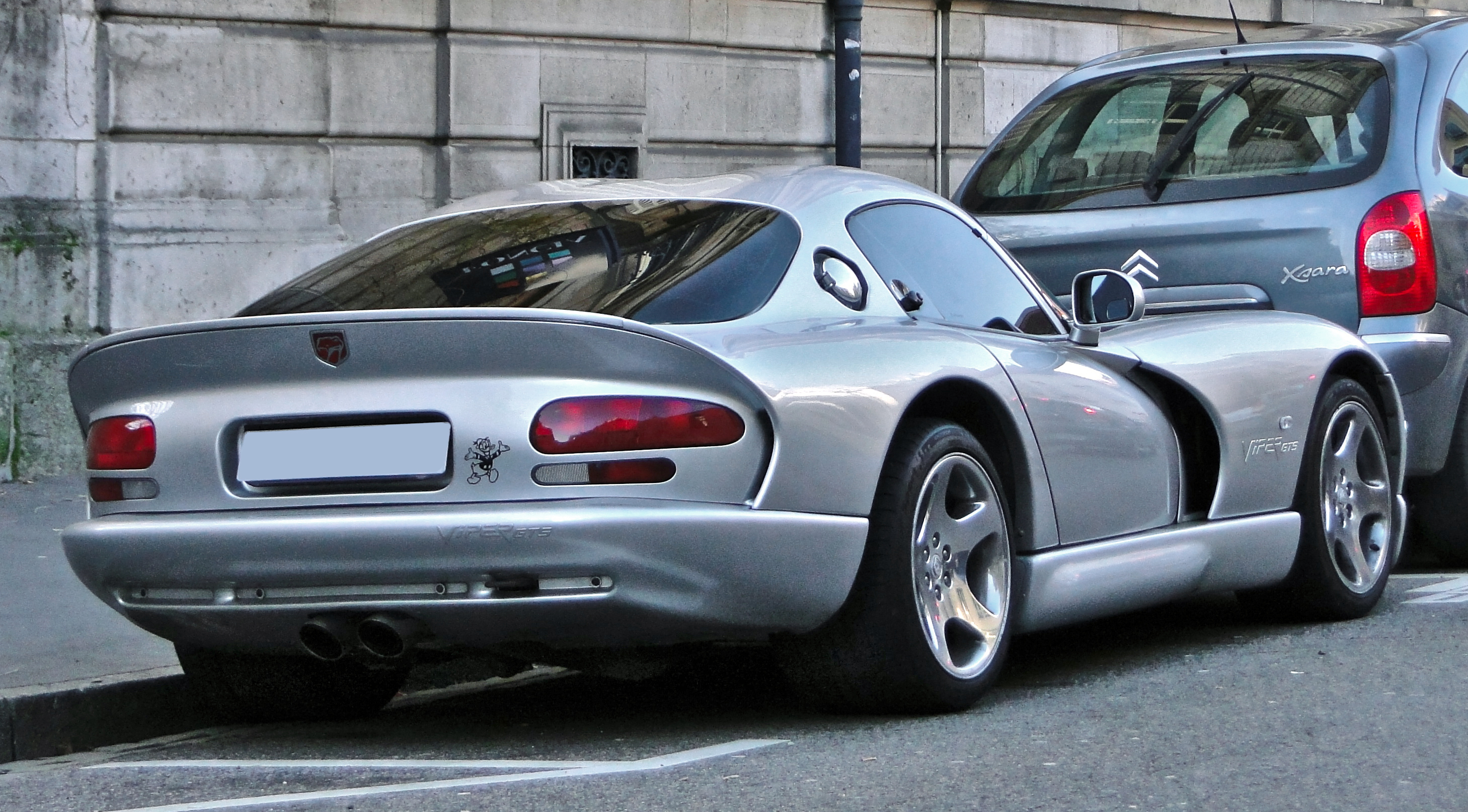
Rear view (GTS)

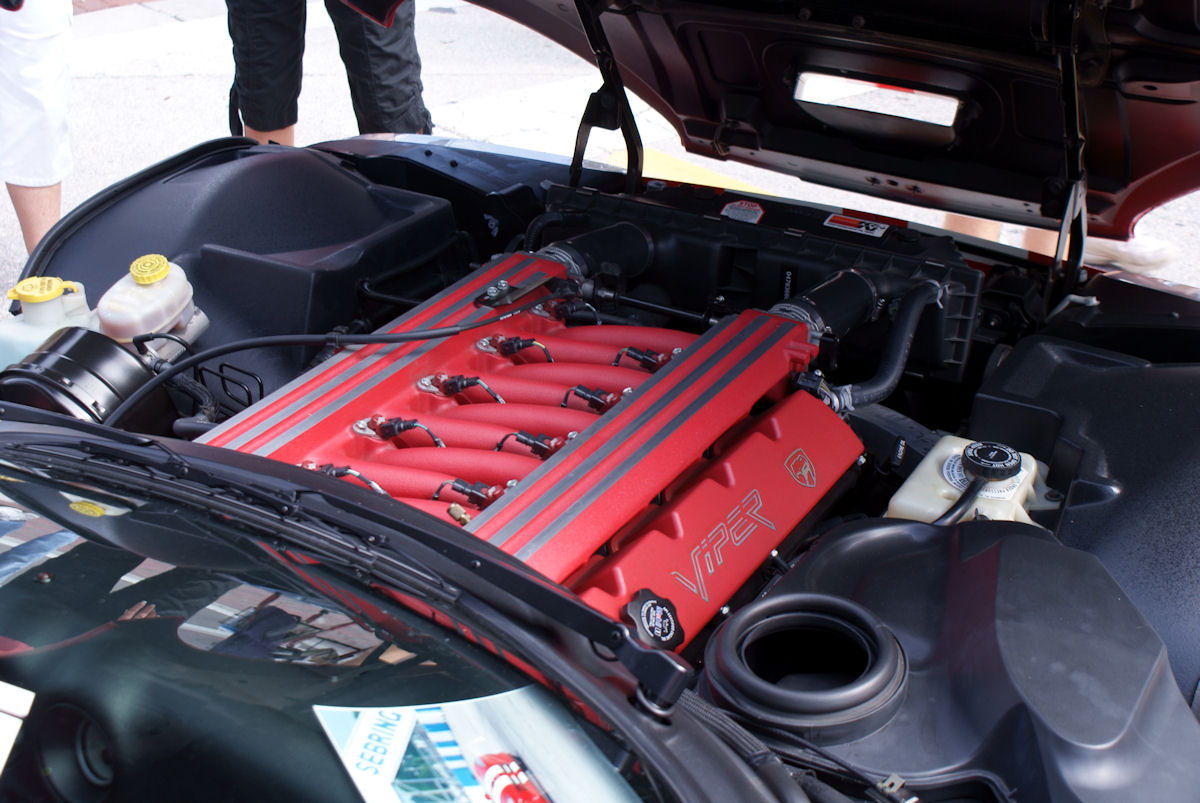
8.0-liter V10 engine

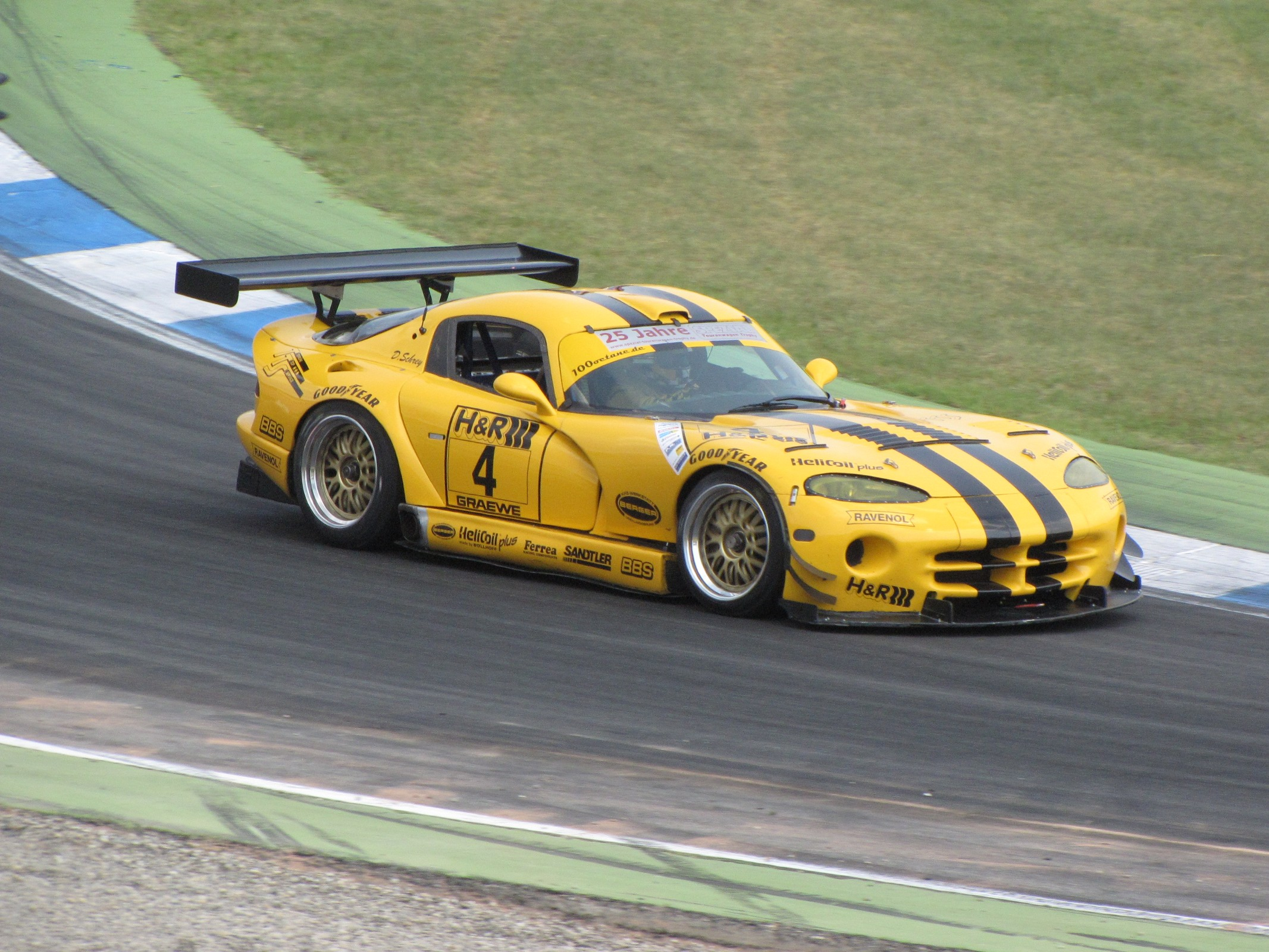
Chrysler Viper GTS-R
