= Test Drive: Off-Road 3 =

1999 video game

Test Drive Off-Road 3
- North American cover art featuring the 1999 Hummer H1
- Developers: Infogrames North America (PlayStation, Windows); Xantera (Game Boy Color)
- Publishers: Infogrames North America; Infogrames Multimedia (Europe)
- Producers: Monte Singman(Executive Producer); Allen Edwards
- Series: Test Drive
- Platforms: Microsoft Windows, PlayStation, Game Boy Color
- Release: NA: 18 October 1999 (PS); NA: 25 October 1999 (PC); NA: 21 December 1999 (GBC); EU: 19 April 2000 (GBC, PS)
- Genre: Racing
- Modes: Single-player, multiplayer

Test Drive Off-Road 3 (4X4 World Trophy in Europe) is a racing video game developed and published by Infogrames North America for Microsoft Windows, PlayStation and Game Boy Color. A Dreamcast version was planned, but was cancelled due to release issues.

== Reception ==
Reception

Aggregate score
Aggregator	Score		
Aggregator	GBC	PC	PS
GameRankings	50%	56%	61%

Review scores
Publication	Score		
Publication	GBC	PC	PS
AllGame	N/A	1.5/5	2.5/5
CNET Gamecenter	N/A	N/A	6/10
Computer Games Strategy Plus	N/A	2/5	N/A
Electronic Gaming Monthly	N/A	N/A	6.25/10 (Note: In Electronic Gaming Monthly's review of the PlayStation version, three critics gave it each a score of 6/10, and the other gave it 7/10.)
Game Informer	N/A	N/A	6/10
GameFan	N/A	40%	N/A
GameRevolution	N/A	N/A	D+
GameSpot	N/A	6.3/10	4.3/10
GameZone	N/A	8.1/10	N/A
IGN	4/10	7.3/10	5/10
Next Generation	N/A	N/A	2/5
Official U.S. PlayStation Magazine	N/A	N/A	2/5

Test Drive: Off-Road 3 received "mixed" reviews on all platforms according to the review aggregation website GameRankings. Doug Trueman of NextGen said that the PlayStation version was "fairly well done, but there are just not enough new features here to raise the game's rating above 'fair.'"

iBot of GamePro said of the PlayStation version in one review, "With Test Drive Off Road 3, Infogrames has delivered a very solid racing game (with a few noticeable flaws) that will really appeal to those who like to drive virtual versions of real cars, but are tired of the paved highways and byways of the other racing titles." (Note: GamePro gave the PlayStation version two 4/5 scores for graphics and fun factor, 4.5/5 for sound, and 3.5/5 for control in one review.) However, Air Hendrix said in another review that the same console version's "slick stylings won't give gamers enough meaty gameplay to go the distance. If you're hardcore about off-road action, Test Drive Off-Road 3's worth renting to check out the cool rides, but everyone else should steer clear." (Note: GamePro gave the PlayStation version two 4.5/5 scores for graphics and sound, and two 3/5 scores for control and fun factor in another review.)
