= Road rash (disambiguation) =

Road rash may refer to:

- Road rash, a colloquial term for skin injury caused by abrasion with road surfaces

== Video games ==
- Road Rash, a motorcycle-racing video game series:

- Road Rash (1991 video game), a racing and vehicular combat video game
- Road Rash II, a racing and vehicular combat game
- Road Rash (1994 video game), a racing and vehicular combat game
- Road Rash 3, a racing and vehicular combat game
- Road Rash 3D, a racing and vehicular combat game
- Road Rash 64, a racing and vehicular combat game
- Road Rash: Jailbreak, a racing and vehicular combat game
