= Road Rash (1991 video game) =

1991 racing video game

- North American Genesis box art
- Developers: Electronic Arts: Amiga; Peakstar Software; Game Gear, Master System; Probe Software; Game Boy; The Code Monkeys
- Publishers: Electronic Arts: Game Gear, Master System; U.S. Gold; Game Boy; Ocean Software
- Director: Carl Mey
- Producer: Randy Breen
- Designers: Randy Breen; Dan Geisler; Walter Stein
- Programmers: Dan Geisler; Walter Stein; Carl Mey
- Artists: Arthur Koch; Peggy Brennan; Connie Braat
- Composers: Rob Hubbard: Amiga; Jason A.S. Whitely; Game Gear, Master System; Greg Michael
- Series: Road Rash
- Platforms: Sega Genesis, Amiga, Master System, Game Gear, Game Boy
- Release: September 1991: Genesis; NA/EU: September 1991 Amiga; EU: December 1992 Game Gear; NA: March 1994; EU: March 10, 1994 Master System; EU: March 10, 1994 Game Boy; NA: June 1994
- Genres: Racing, vehicular combat
- Modes: Single-player, multiplayer

Road Rash is a 1991 racing and vehicular combat video game developed and published by Electronic Arts (EA) for the Sega Genesis. It was subsequently ported to a variety of contemporary systems by differing companies. The game is centered around a series of motorcycle races throughout California that the player must win to advance to higher-difficulty races, while engaging in unarmed and armed combat to hinder the other racers.

Road Rash was one of the first games conceived by EA following the company's decision to begin developing games internally. The game's programmers Dan Geisler and Carl Mey were hired by EA to create a banked road effect for Mario Andretti Racing, then being developed as an NES title. When the NES hardware proved incapable of rendering the desired effect, focus shifted to a motorcycle racing game for the more powerful Sega Genesis. The game includes combat elements that were inspired by the violent behavior of Grand Prix motorcyclists during races, and the resulting uncertainty surrounding the game's genre created conflict between EA's development team and management.

Road Rash was released to critical and commercial success, and was EA's most profitable title to date. The original version for the Sega Genesis was particularly acclaimed for its violent and aggressive gameplay and the convincing sense of speed in its graphics. The game is the debut installment of the Road Rash series, and was followed by a number of sequels made for various consoles.

== Gameplay ==
An example of gameplay in the Genesis version of Road Rash

Road Rash puts the player in control of a motorcycle racer who must finish in fourth place or higher among fourteen other racers; the player advances throughout the game's five levels by winning five races on each level. The game is primarily single-player, but allows for two players to play intermittently against each other. The game's races take place in a number of Californian settings, including Grass Valley, the Sierra Nevada, Napa Valley, and the Pacific Coast Highway. During a race, the racer can brake, accelerate, and attack neighboring opponents. The racer will punch at the nearest opponent with a default input, while holding a directional button during the input will result in either a backhand or a kick. Some opponents wield clubs, which can be taken and used by the racer if the opponent is attacked as they are holding the club out to strike. The racer can be ejected from their bike if they crash into an obstacle (such as cows, deer, cars, and trees) or if they run out of stamina (shown in the bottom-left corner of the screen) due to fights with opponents. In this event, the racer will automatically run back toward their bike, though the player can alter their course and avoid incoming traffic with the directional buttons, or stand still by holding the brake input button. Opponents will likewise be ejected from their bike if their own stamina is depleted; the stamina of the nearest opponent is visible within the bottom-right corner of the screen.

The racer begins the game with $1,000 and earns cash prizes for each successful race. Between races, the player can access a shop and view several bikes of differing weights, speeds, and steering capabilities, and the player may purchase a new bike with the money they have accumulated. The player will receive a password at the end of a successful race, which can be entered at a password entry screen in a subsequent session to maintain the player's progress; The player will advance to the next level after winning a race on all five of the game's tracks. The player wins the game by winning a race on each track in all five levels.

The bike has its own "damage meter" between the racer's and opponents' stamina meters, which decreases every time the racer suffers a crash. The bike will be wrecked if the meter fully depletes, which ends the player's participation in the current race and deducts the cost of a repair bill from the racer's balance. Motor officers make sporadic appearances throughout the game's tracks, and can also end the player's participation if they apprehend the racer following a crash, which deducts the cost of a fine from their balance. If the racer lacks the funds to cover either a repair bill or a fine, the game will end prematurely.

== Development and release ==
=== Conception and early development ===
Road Rash was one of the first titles conceived by EA after they made the decision to begin developing video games in-house; until that point, EA had previously outsourced video game development to external studios, and were primarily focused on PC games due to the effects of the video game crash of 1983. In its tentative steps back into the console market, EA focused on genres that were determined to be strategic, namely sports and racing titles. Preliminary development began on an NES title named Mario Andretti Racing, and programmer Dan Geisler was hired by the company at this time. Technical director Carl Mey, who had just been laid off from Epyx following its bankruptcy, was also hired by EA and was given his first major project of creating a "banked road" effect for the game. Mey soon realized that while the NES was capable of road-scaling effects, banking would be beyond the console's ability. Producer and designer Randy Breen, who was previously involved with Indianapolis 500: The Simulation, was influenced by the difficulty and tedium of that title to create a racing game with more accessibility and entertainment value. Because Andretti was set to follow a similar formula to Indianapolis 500, Geisler, Breen, May and co-designer Walter Stein began a brainstorming session for a different type of racing game that would not necessarily adhere to realism. After Mey and Geisler rejected QuadRunners as potential racing vehicles due to Andretti's dirt track setting, Breen suggested motorcycles. Breen recounted: "I'd been into motorcycles for a long time, and we quickly realized bikes gave us lots of technical advantages. For instance, we could put more bikes than cars onscreen at once, and the bikers were more visible than car drivers, so they could be more expressive". The game's title originated from Breen reminiscing to the group about riding his own bike on Mulholland Drive to meet with friends and thinking to himself: "Man, if you wiped out here, you'd get some serious road rash". Geisler suggested the title Road Rash on Mulholland Drive, and Breen used the name to pitch the concept to EA. The title was eventually shortened to Road Rash, and development moved from the NES to the recently introduced Sega Genesis, which was powerful enough to generate the desired road effects.

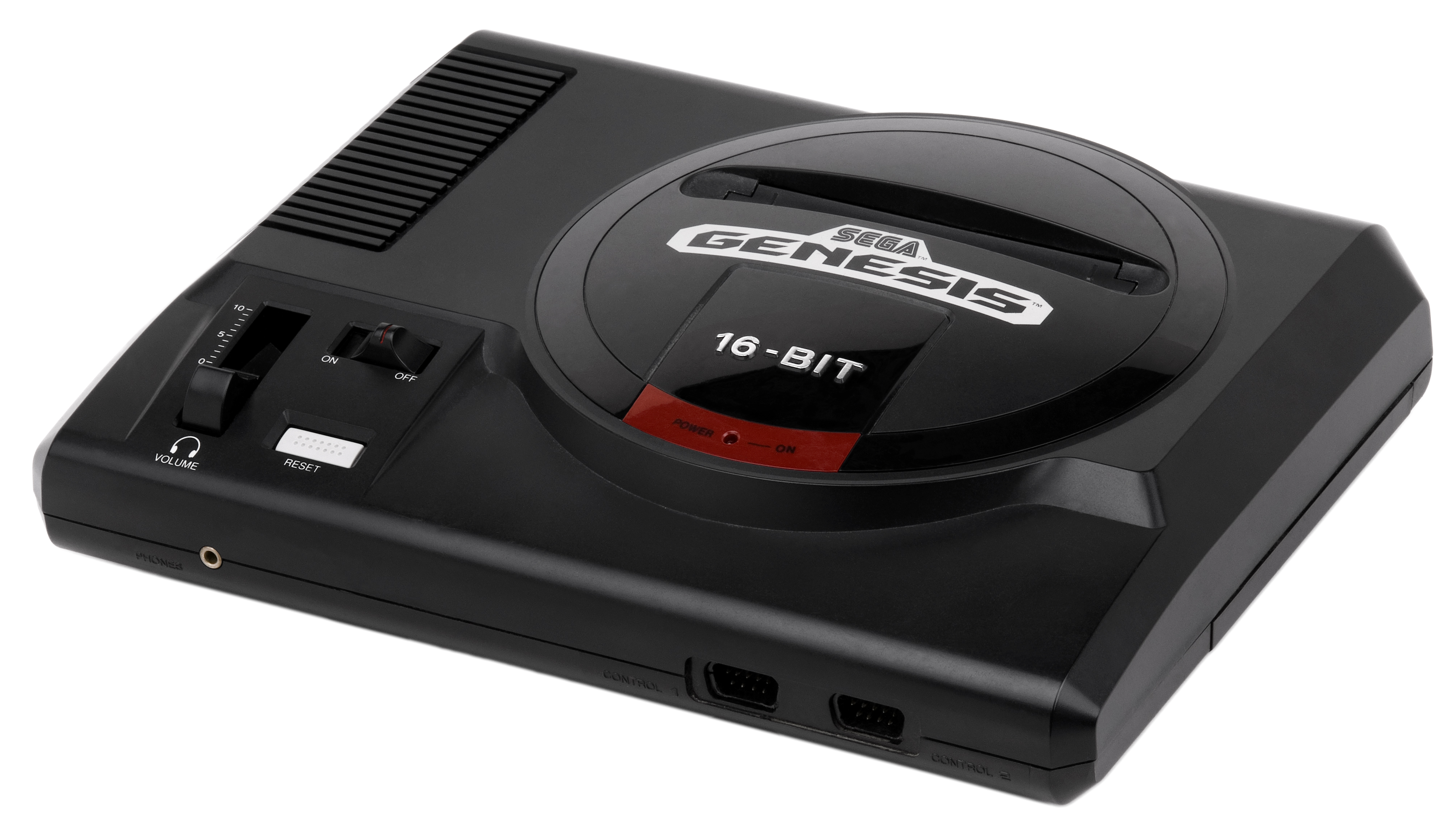
Development for Road Rash was moved to the Sega Genesis (pictured) after preliminary development for Mario Andretti Racing on the NES proved impractical.

Before joining EA, Geisler had worked on Spectrum HoloByte's racing game Vette!; Geisler's coding for this title provided the framework for Road Rash, particularly its algorithm for estimating road curvature. Geisler claimed that the Genesis's memory capacity could have allowed him to create 802 miles of unique roads, and that he could have accurately mapped out the entire coast of California. The road effect for Road Rash took Geisler about six months to create, comprising a large portion of the game's early development. 3D-rendering technology for the game was adapted from the Genesis version of Blockout, which was in development at the same time. Lead artist Arthur Koch was brought onto the development team after the project was well underway, and he was tasked with training the other artists on using EA's in-house tools and conforming to the Genesis's 64-color palette, which Koch stated "was hard for a lot of artists to grasp". Several months into development, EA made the decision to promote Road Rash at the 1990 Consumer Electronics Show as a show of support for the Sega Genesis. This initial demonstration proved unsatisfactory; Breen recalled that they struggled to maintain a reasonable frame rate and the animations were ineffective. Mey also had concerns with "the very tame, almost Disney-like view of the AMA, and Randy's desire to make it a 'go anywhere'-style game". He remarked that the development team would refer to the game as "Randy's Sunday Ride" behind his back, and that "Road Rash needed more balls to sell than a simulation of someone following the speed limit". Following the show, the game needed to be re-pitched twice to avoid cancellation, and the team was given an additional six months to improve the game.

=== Revamp and release ===
Mey requested to EA producer Richard Hilleman that he be given creative control over the gameplay on the grounds that he "wanted to make the game kick ass", to which Hilleman agreed. Over the following months, Geisler and Stein improved the game's performance, and Connie Braat refined the animation. To increase the player's sense of immersion, the rival racers were given individual names and characters, and would deliver banter in between races. The motor officers who pursue the player and arrest them if they crash were added to the game to create tension. To obtain reference material, Koch went to a local police department and convinced a motor officer to pose for photographs. The wipe-out animations were brought about by Koch's previous work on John Madden Football and Lakers versus Celtics and the NBA Playoffs; on the subject, Koch said: "I was disappointed with the tackles and the falls and the fouls. I thought they could be a lot more dynamic. So I suggested that we devote more frames of animation to the crashes". Breen cited additional influence from Wile E. Coyote and the Road Runner and "other cartoons where the villain gets beat up", adding that "even though it set you back, it was still fun to watch". The combat element of the game was inspired by the behavior of Grand Prix motorcyclists, who Breen noticed would sometimes shove and kick each other during races. Other influences on this aspect include the biker gang action scenes in Akira (1988) and the tire pump scene in Breaking Away (1979).

While working on the game's combat system, Mey and Geisler set a "no projectiles" rule, as such elements were a major issue in game engines that ran based on the frame rate. The introduction of fighting elements served to muddy the game's genre classification among EA's management, as they primarily specialized in simulation games and were uncertain how to market a title that was simultaneously a fighting and a racing game. Geisler named Hang-On as an influence in the game's direction, saying that "Hang-On before us was a game I liked, but I thought it was limited – no hills, no punching, no kicking. I respect Yu Suzuki, but I had it in my mind that this was going to make Hang-On obsolete. And I think we kind of accomplished that". Due to the game's violent content, EA was unable to secure official licenses from existing manufacturers, and so created soundalike brands in their place; "Panda", "Shuriken", "Kamikaze", and "Diablo" are respectively derived from Honda, Suzuki, Kawasaki, and Ducati. The game's roads were modeled by a crew led by Domonique Philipine and made use of Bézier curves. Breen claimed that the final road effect made some players vomit from motion sickness, to which he yelled out "Great. I've finally made a game that makes people puke!" Simultaneous multiplayer, which would become a common feature of subsequent Road Rash titles, was not yet possible due to the CPU power consumed by the game's road effect. The game's music was composed by Rob Hubbard. Road Rash was Hubbard's second motorcycle-based game following the 1985 Mastertronic title Action Biker.

The development of Road Rash spanned a total of approximately 21 months. Breen took advantage of EA's policy of not crediting producers on box art by removing Mey's name and inserting his own. This incident led to EA abolishing the practice of box-printed credits altogether. Mey would be presented with EA's in-house "Fireman of the Year" award, an accolade given to employees with the most impact on troubled projects. The Genesis version was released in North America and Europe in September 1991. The Amiga version was developed by Peakstar Software, featured music composed by Jason A.S. Whitely, and was released in December 1992. Road Rash was converted for the Game Gear and Master System by Gary Priest of Probe Software, with music adapted by Greg Michael. These versions were released in March 1994. The Game Boy version was published by Ocean Software and released in June 1994.

In April 1996, THQ announced a Super NES version of Road Rash for a Christmas 1996 release that ultimately did not materialize. The Genesis version of Road Rash, along with its immediate sequels II and 3, was included in the PlayStation Portable compilation title EA Replay in 2006. In November 2026, a restored version of Road Rash was released onto Steam, GOG.com, and the EA App.

== Reception ==
Reception

Review scores
Publication	Score
Computer and Video Games	GEN: 91%
GamePro	GEN: 20/20; GG: 18.5/20
Amiga Format	AMI: 84%
CU Amiga	AMI: 81%
Mean Machines	GEN: 91% MS: 88%
MegaTech	GEN: 92%
MegaZone	GEN: 92%

The Genesis version of Road Rash was met with critical acclaim. KITS disc jockey Big Rick Stuart, writing for GamePro, gave the game a perfect score and called it "an instantly addictive motorcycle 16-bit game with a somewhat sick twist thrown in". MegaTech magazine said: "Lots of races, lots of bikes, and plenty of thrills 'n' spills make this the best racer on the Megadrive!" Paul Glancey and Tim Boone of Computer and Video Games respectively described the game as a "beat 'em up on motorbikes" and "Super Hang-On with fists and clubs thrown in"; both reviewers noted that the graphics were convincing in their creation of the illusion of speed in spite of the fairly simple visuals, and Glancey added that the aggressive nature of the gameplay "broadens the enjoyment you get from Road Rash a great deal and makes you wonder why no-one thought of it before". Mark Bruton of MegaZone said that the game's "vividly realistic" settings were complemented by the "excellently detailed" graphics and multi-level parallax scrolling, and was amused by the biker vocalizations, which were "very funny in a sick way". Richard Leadbetter and Julian Rignall of Mean Machines both praised the convincing three-dimensional effect of the graphics, with Leadbetter additionally commending the "brilliant" sound effects and Hubbard's "great" music. Road Rash was the 9th best-selling Genesis title in the United Kingdom in February 1992. In the United States, Road Rash was the third highest-renting Genesis title at Blockbuster Video in April 1992, and the ninth highest-renting in the following month. At the time of its release, Road Rash became EA's most profitable title. Mega placed the game at No. 8 on their Top Mega Drive Games of All Time. Game Informer ranked it as the 88th best game ever made in their 100th issue in 2001. The staff praised its more violent take on motorcycle video games. In 1996, GamesMaster rated the Mega Drive version 90th on their "Top 100 Games of All Time".

The Amiga release of Road Rash was received positively. Neil Jackson of Amiga Format found the violent gameplay to be "just all-out thrash fun" that would "annoy everyone from the road safety crew to the Mary Whitehouse brigade", but added that the game "sounds like a kazoo [and] looks like a moped on an 8-bit". CU Amiga described the game as an "immensely playable" and "nicely violent" alternative to normal racing games, but noted that the Amiga version runs slower than the Genesis version and "doesn't deliver the feeling of charging down a road at 120mph". Road Rash was the fourth-highest selling Amiga title in the United Kingdom in its debut month, and remained among the top-30 best-sellers for five more months.

The Game Gear/Master System version also received positive reviews. Manny LaMancha of GamePro commended the simple controls, clean and clear graphics, ample audio, and high challenge. Radion Automatic and Lucy Hickman of Mean Machines Sega praised the fast and easy-to-control gameplay, large sprites, and detailed and smooth graphics, though Hickman noted the absence of a simultaneous two-player mode as a drawback. Road Rash was the sixth highest-selling Game Gear title at Babbage's in its first month, and stayed within the top ten highest-selling Game Gear titles for the next five months.

== Legacy ==
Road Rash was followed by two sequels on the Genesis, Road Rash II and Road Rash 3, as well as further spin-offs developed for later platforms such as the PlayStation, Nintendo 64, and Game Boy Advance. The Genesis titles achieved similar critical and commercial success to their predecessor, while the installments made for later consoles were met with mixed receptions and failed to recreate the success of the Genesis versions. EA attempted to capitalize on Road Rash's success by repurposing its game engine and mix of combat and racing for the 1994 inline skating title Skitchin'. Road Rash: Jailbreak, the last official installment of the series, was released in 2000. A spiritual successor to the Road Rash series, Road Redemption, was developed by Ian Fisch and released in 2017.
