= Road Rash 64 =

1999 video game

- European box art
- Developer: Pacific Coast Power and Light
- Publisher: THQ (Note: Under license from Electronic Arts)
- Director: Cory Ondrejka
- Producer: Gabriel Jones
- Designer: Richard McGovern
- Programmers: John Grigsby; Leif Terry
- Artists: Chris Adams; Ben Ridgway; Dane Shears; Brian Walker
- Composer: Steve Kirk
- Series: Road Rash
- Platform: Nintendo 64
- Release: NA: September 22, 1999; EU: December 17, 1999
- Genre: Racing
- Modes: Single-player, multiplayer

Road Rash 64 is a 1999 racing game developed by Pacific Coast Power and Light and published by THQ for the Nintendo 64. The game is the fifth of seven entries in the Road Rash series of video games, the only entry to be published by THQ and the only entry to be released for the Nintendo 64 platform.

== Gameplay ==
The game plays similarly to previous games developed in the Road Rash series, which involves the player racing their motorcycle against other motorcyclists. While racing, the player has the option of punching, or using weapons to attack other racers, to slow down their progress. The ultimate goal is to place first in the race, and do damage to others, in order to gain more money to upgrade the player's motorcycle. Conversely, the worst scenario is to be "busted" by police officers, who intervene when situations get too hectic or racers damage them, which costs the player money. If the player was unable to afford the fine, that game is over. In a similar situation, it was also possible to lose without getting busted; should a player's damages become sufficiently acute the motorcycle would be sent to a mechanic who would charge for parts and labor in order to get back into the game. Being unable to afford the mechanic's bill had the same consequences as being busted and unable to pay.

Unlike past games in the series, which used a single long road in independent locales, the game took place on routes laid out through an interconnected road system. The race routes were pieced together from branching road segments. Another new feature is the Cop Mode, which lets players switch roles as a police officer trying to "bust" the other racers.

== Music ==
The game featured licensed music from bands such as Sugar Ray, CIV, The Mermen, and Full on the Mouth. Sugar Ray contributed two songs, one of which was "Mean Machine", from their debut album Lemonade and Brownies.

== Development ==
Unlike most games in the series, it was not developed or published by Electronic Arts, but rather by Pacific Coast Power and Light and published by THQ respectively. The game was originally thought to be a straight port of the game Road Rash 3D for the PlayStation. However, that game ended up emphasizing the racing aspect much more so, where as this game was considered a "complete rethinking" of the game, with much greater emphasis on combat, similar to past games, such as Road Rash II.

The game was designed to use very low polygon models, low resolution textures, and few special effects in order to support the abundance of action onscreen, while being able to keep a high frame rate. With the addition of the Expansion Pak in the Nintendo 64 system, alternate graphics options, wide screen, letterboxed, and high resolution settings, were available to choose from in addition to the default graphics setting.

== Reception ==
Reception

Aggregate score
Aggregator	Score
GameRankings	68%

Review scores
Publication	Score
AllGame	3.5/5
Consoles +	84%
Electronic Gaming Monthly	4.25/10
Game Informer	8/10
GamePro	(B.F.) 4/5 (U.D.) 3.5/5
GameSpot	7.9/10
Hyper	73%
IGN	7.8/10
Nintendo Power	7.2/10

The game received "average" reviews according to the review aggregation website GameRankings. GameSpot praised the game for ultimately being fun, especially with multiplayer, but criticized the blurry graphics and repetitive sound and music. IGN was more positive about the sound and music, and praised the game for its fun combat, and the way in which the game tallies the player's combat accomplishments at the end of the race. They too complained about the game's graphics, and that the game was far less entertaining when being played single-player. Similarly, AllGame criticized the graphics, namely the courses and character models, as dull and repetitive, but ultimately found that the game was fun in the same ways that the trilogy of Road Rash games were on the Sega Genesis.
