= Mermen =

Mermen may refer to:

- The Mermen, a music group
- Merman, male equivalent of a mermaid (mermen is the plural form)
- "1983... (A Merman I Should Turn To Be)", a Jimi Hendrix song
