= Road Rash 3D =

1998 video game

- North American cover art
- Developer: Electronic Arts
- Publisher: Electronic Arts
- Producer: Hunter Smith
- Programmers: Philippe Tarbouriech; Tim Wilson
- Artists: Jeff Smith; Al Tofanelli
- Series: Road Rash
- Platform: PlayStation
- Release: NA: June 10, 1998; EU: June 1998
- Genre: Racing
- Mode: Single-player

Road Rash 3D is a racing video game developed and published by Electronic Arts exclusively for the PlayStation.

== Gameplay ==
The game plays similarly to previous games developed in the Road Rash series, which involves the player racing their motorcycle against other motorcyclists. Gameplay favors an arcade-like style, with little emphasis on realism. While racing, the player has the option of punching, or using weapons to attack other opponents, to slow down their progress. The ultimate goal is to place first in the race in order to earn money to upgrade the player's motorcycle. Conversely, the worst scenarios are to finish last, which does not earn money, or be stopped by police officers, which actually loses money. Despite sharing many characteristics with past games in the series, Road Rash 3D puts a stronger emphasis on the racing aspect of the game, and less on combat.

The individual courses for the game are pieced together from a larger system of interconnected grids of roads. Courses may overlap common segments of other tracks, but often have different start or end points, or have the player turning down alternate routes. While the player can opt to take the wrong route, taking them very far typically results in hitting "invisible walls" that restrict further movement in the given direction.

== Music ==
Thanks to a licensing agreement with Atlantic Records, the game features music from bands such as Sugar Ray, Kid Rock, CIV, The Mermen, Full on the Mouth, and The Tea Party. Sugar Ray contributed three songs, "Speed Home California", "Tap, Twist, Snap" and "Mean Machine", as well as short track "The Club".

== Development ==
The biker animations were created using motion capture, with the motion capture actors perched on motorcycle mock-ups.

A PC version with LAN enabled multiplayer and support for force feedback joysticks was planned, but never released.

== Reception ==
Reception

Aggregate score
Aggregator	Score
GameRankings	67%

Review scores
Publication	Score
AllGame	2/5
CNET Gamecenter	8/10
Edge	6/10
Electronic Gaming Monthly	7.75/10
Game Informer	7.75/10
GameFan	75% (Note: Three critics of GameFan gave the game each a score of 83, 75, and 68.) (A.C.) (mixed)
GameRevolution	D
GameSpot	7.6/10
IGN	5/10
Next Generation	2/5
Official U.S. PlayStation Magazine	3/5

Road Rash 3D received "average" reviews according to the review aggregation website GameRankings. The most common complaint was that the game failed to live up to the prior games in the series on the Sega Genesis and 3DO, especially that it lacked a two-player multiplayer mode. Edge highlighted the game's network of interconnecting roads, "impressive" 3D engine, and track design, but criticized the execution of combat moves for being unresponsive and impractical, saying that they require precise timing and a significant degree of luck. GamePro noted that despite having some flaws in the gameplay, they considered it a worthy installment in the series. (Note: GamePro gave the game three 4.5/5 scores for graphics, sound, and control, and a perfect 5/5 for fun factor.)

In a mixed review, GameSpot criticized the game for its graphical glitches, and for the fact that the game reduced the actual combat aspect of the gameplay that the series had been known for in prior iterations. IGN complained that despite two to three years of development time, that the game managed to control worse, and play slower, than the series' last release on the 3DO. AllGame echoed these sentiments, questioning the game's slow pace, graphical glitches, and overall lower quality than the prior game for the 3DO. GameRevolution referred to it as "one of the worst motorcycle games...ever" and summarized that the game did not come close to its predecessors regarding its gameplay. Next Generation was generally critical to gameplay and graphics and gave it a score 2 stars out of 5.

Road Rash 3D won the "Outstanding Achievement in Sound and Music" award at AIAS' 2nd Annual Interactive Achievement Awards and was a finalist for "8th Annual GamePro Readers' Choice Awards" for "Best Racing Game of The Year", but lost to Gran Turismo.

== Response and legacy ==
The game's lack of multiplayer and lack of emphasis on combat was frequently cited as a shortcoming of the game by critics. Electronic Arts representatives defended the lack of multiplayer, stating that the feature was impossible due to the way game data was streamed from the game disc. Such concerns were addressed in subsequent future releases. A year later, on September 27, 1999, Road Rash 64 was released. While it was initially thought to be a simple port of the game for the Nintendo 64, the end product turned out to be a major reworking of the game, putting a greater emphasis on combat, and including several multiplayer modes with support to up to four players. Additionally, the next game in the series, Road Rash: Jailbreak, especially focused gameplay on a two player cooperative mode where a second player can join in on a motorcycle's side car.
