= EA Replay =

2006 video game

- Developer: EA Canada
- Publisher: Electronic Arts
- Platform: PlayStation Portable
- Release: NA: November 14, 2006; AU: March 15, 2007; EU: March 16, 2007
- Genre: Various
- Mode: Single-player

EA Replay is a retro-themed compilation for the PlayStation Portable comprising a number of classic games. It was released in the United States on November 14, 2006, with Australian and European releases shortly afterwards.

A sequel, EA Replay 2, was planned, but it was cancelled.

== Compiled games ==
The compilation includes the following titles:

Titles included in EA Replay
Title	Release	System	Notes
B.O.B.	1993	Super Nintendo	
Budokan: The Martial Spirit	1990	Mega Drive/Genesis	
Desert Strike: Return to the Gulf	1992	Mega Drive/Genesis	
Haunting Starring Polterguy	1993	Mega Drive/Genesis	
Jungle Strike	1993	Mega Drive/Genesis	
Mutant League Football	1993	Mega Drive/Genesis	
Road Rash	1991	Mega Drive/Genesis	
Road Rash II	1992	Mega Drive/Genesis	
Road Rash 3	1995	Mega Drive/Genesis	
Syndicate	1995	Super Nintendo	
Ultima VII: The Black Gate	1994	Super Nintendo	
Virtual Pinball	1993	Mega Drive/Genesis	
Wing Commander	1992	Super Nintendo	
Wing Commander: Secret Missions	1993	Super Nintendo	

AD HOC Multiplayer is available for Budokan, Mutant League Football, and Road Rash II.

There are unlockable pieces of game art for each title.

The music in the Road Rash games has been replaced with a single new looping music track.

The collection was released as a digital download for the PlayStation Network in Europe in January 2009.

== Reception ==
Reception

Aggregate score
Aggregator	Score
Metacritic	56/100

Review scores
Publication	Score
EP Daily	6/10
Eurogamer	5/10
Game Informer	6.75/10
GameDaily	6/10
GameSpot	5.7/10
GameSpy	1.5/5
GameZone	7/10
Pocket Gamer	1/5
PlayStation: The Official Magazine	5/10
Retro Gamer	49%
VideoGamer.com	5/10

The game received "mixed" reviews according to the review aggregation website Metacritic.
