= A Glorious Lethal Euphoria =

Studio album by the Mermen
- Released: 1995
- Studio: Mr. Toad's
- Genre: Surf rock
- Labels: Toadophile; Mesa/Bluemoon
- Producers: Jim Thomas, Mermen

The Mermen chronology
| Live at the Haunted House (1994) | A Glorious Lethal Euphoria (1995) | Songs of the Cows EP (1996) |

A Glorious Lethal Euphoria is an album by the American band the Mermen, released in 1995. The album was bought by Atlantic Records, which distributed it via their Mesa label. It won a Bay Area Music Award for "Outstanding Independent Album or EP". The band supported the album with a North American tour.

== Production ==
Produced by Jim Thomas and the Mermen, the album was recorded at Mr. Toad's Recording Studio, in San Francisco, California. It ends with Thomas's version of "Brahms 3rd Movement 3rd Symphony". The other songs were written and titled by Thomas, who took "With No Definite Future and No Purpose Other Than to Prevail Somehow..." from a line in Lauren Bacall's autobiography.

== Critical reception ==
Professional ratings
Review scores
| Source | Rating |
|---|---|
| AllMusic | 4.5/5 stars |
| MusicHound Rock: The Essential Album Guide | 4/5 stars |
| The Province | 3.5/4 stars |
| The Tampa Tribune | 2.5/4 stars |

Rolling Stone opined that "hints of Dick Dale filter through the cracked-sidewalk wave forms of Sonic Youth." Trouser Press wrote: "Equally capable of settling down to precise figures of reverbed/tremoloed modesty, [Thomas] whips the luridly titled originals ('Scalp Salad', 'Pulpin’ Line', 'The Drowning Man Knows His God') into stormy seas of aggressive rock virulence and sends soft breezes to caress placid lily pads, never settling for generic methodology." Miami New Times thought that the Mermen "combine Dale's hard-picking percussive attack with the feedback grandeur of Neil Young's late-baroque work with Crazy Horse and end up with something else entirely, at once menacing and eerily pretty."

Guitar Player determined that "Thomas' ambient, whammy-articulated Fender tones are luscious, and his melodic lines can be snaky and sinister or as open-spirited as a desert skyline." The Chicago Tribune concluded that "the trio explores hovering, ambient textures that evoke British pioneers such as My Bloody Valentine and See Feel; rambles into the dissonant terrain of New York's post-No Wave guitar bands; and brings dark-tinged introspection to its long-form pieces that suggests more than passing familiarity with jazz giant John Coltrane."

AllMusic wrote that "the Mermen are worshippers at the feet of the mighty Dick Dale, surf-guitar god, and they aren't afraid to demonstrate that with all the passion at their command."

== Track listing ==
| No. | Title | Length |
|---|---|---|
| 1. | "Pulpin' Line" | 3:58 |
| 2. | "With No Definite Future and No Purpose Other Than to Prevail Somehow..." | 4:27 |
| 3. | "The Drowning Man Knows His God" | 3:33 |
| 4. | "Scalp Salad" | 3:53 |
| 5. | "Obsession for Men" | 9:23 |
| 6. | "Blue Xoam" | 4:10 |
| 7. | "Under the Kou Tree" | 5:42 |
| 8. | "Lizards" | 3:57 |
| 9. | "Quo Me Cunque Rapit Tempestas, Deforor Hospes" | 5:15 |
| 10. | "The Drub" | 3:22 |
| 11. | "The Intractable Boy" | 4:28 |
| 12. | "Between I and Thou" | 9:17 |
| 13. | "And the Flowers They'll Bloom" | 9:49 |
| 14. | "Brahms 3rd Movement 3rd Symphony" | 2:40 |
| Total length: | | 1:13:54 |

== Personnel ==
- Martyn Jones – drums
- Jim Thomas – guitar
- Allen Whitman – bass
