= Road Rash (1994 video game) =

1994 racing video game

- North American 3DO box art
- Developers: Monkey Do Productions (3DO, SCD); Buzz Puppet Productions (PS, SAT, PC) (Note: In association with Advanced Technology Group for the 3DO, PlayStation, and Sega Saturn versions; in association with New Level Software for the Sega CD version; in association with Papyrus Design Group for the Microsoft Windows version.)
- Publisher: Electronic Arts
- Director: Keith McCurdy
- Producer: Randy Breen
- Designers: Randy Breen; Lori Washbon
- Programmers: Randy Dillon; Dan Hewitt; David Stokes; Emmanuel Berriet
- Artist: Jeff Smith
- Writers: David Luoto; Jamie Poolos
- Composer: Don Veca
- Series: Road Rash
- Platforms: 3DO, Sega CD, PlayStation, Sega Saturn, Windows
- Release: July 1994: 3DO; NA: July 1994; EU: 1994 Sega CD; NA: March 1995 PlayStation; NA: February 1996; EU: 1996 Saturn; NA: June 26, 1996; EU: July 26, 1996 Windows; NA: September 27, 1996; EU: September 1996
- Genres: Racing, vehicular combat
- Modes: Single-player, multiplayer

Road Rash is a 1994 racing/vehicular combat video game originally published by Electronic Arts (EA) for the 3DO Interactive Multiplayer. A version for the Sega CD was developed simultaneously and released in 1995 to act as a "bridge" between the 3DO version and the Sega Genesis title Road Rash 3, and the game was subsequently ported to the PlayStation, Sega Saturn, and Microsoft Windows in 1996. The game is the third installment in the Road Rash series, and is centered around a series of motorcycle races throughout California that the player must win to advance to higher-difficulty races, while engaging in unarmed and armed combat to hinder the other racers.

The arrival of fifth-generation game consoles influenced EA to incorporate character sprites digitized from real-life actors, 25 minutes of live-action full-motion video footage and a soundtrack primarily consisting of licensed grunge music courtesy of A&M Records, including Soundgarden, Monster Magnet, and Swervedriver. Road Rash was released to critical acclaim and commercial success, with reviewers commending the 3DO version's advanced visuals and grunge-based soundtrack. Reception to the ports was more middling, as they were considered dated by the time of their release.

== Gameplay ==
An example of gameplay from the 3DO version. The game's crew members physically portrayed the characters and were digitized into sprites.

Road Rash puts the player in control of a motorcycle racer who must finish in third place or higher among fourteen other racers; the player advances throughout the game's five levels by winning five races on each level. The game's races take place in a number of Californian settings, including San Francisco, the Sierra Nevada, Napa Valley, and the Pacific Coast Highway. During a race, the racer can brake, accelerate, and attack neighboring opponents. The racer will punch at the nearest opponent with a default input, while holding a directional button during the input will result in either a backhand or a kick. Some opponents wield weapons such as clubs and chains, which can be taken and used by the racer if the opponent is attacked as they are holding the weapon out to strike. The racer can be ejected from their bike if they crash into an obstacle (such as cows, deer, cars and trees) or if they run out of stamina (shown in the bottom-left corner of the screen) due to fights with opponents. In this event, the racer will automatically run back toward their bike, though the player can alter their course and avoid incoming traffic with the directional buttons, or stand still by holding the brake input button. Opponents will likewise be ejected from their bike if their own stamina is depleted; the stamina of the nearest opponent is visible within the bottom-right corner of the screen. In the Sega CD version, the color of the opponent's stamina meter indicates their level of aggressiveness toward the racer.

The racer begins the game with a set amount of money and earns cash prizes for each successful race. From the main menu, the player can access a shop and view several bikes of differing weights, speeds and steering capabilities, and the player may purchase a new bike with the money they have accumulated. As the bikes become faster as each level progresses, purchasing a faster bike eventually becomes essential for keeping up with the other racers. Some bikes are equipped with a series of nitrous oxide charges, which can provide a burst of speed if the player quickly taps the acceleration input button twice. The player will advance to the next level after winning a race on all five of the game's tracks. With each subsequent level, the bikes become faster, the other riders fight more aggressively and the tracks become longer and more dangerous. The player wins the game by winning a race on each track in all five levels.

The bike has its own "damage meter" between the racer's and opponents' stamina meters, which decreases every time the racer suffers a crash. The bike will be wrecked if the meter fully depletes, which ends the player's participation in the current race and deducts the cost of a repair bill from the racer's balance. Motor officers make sporadic appearances throughout the game's tracks, and can also end the player's participation if they apprehend the racer following a crash, which deducts the cost of a fine from their balance. Repair bills and fines become more expensive with each subsequent level. If the racer lacks the funds to cover either a repair bill or a fine, the game will end prematurely.

Road Rash is primarily single-player, but allows for two players to play intermittently against each other. The game features two distinct modes of single-player gameplay: the central campaign "Big Game Mode" and a stripped-down "Thrash Mode", in which the player can race on any given track at any difficulty. In the Big Game Mode, the player takes on the identity of one of a selection of characters with differing statistics. Smaller characters accelerate more quickly, while larger characters have stronger attacks. Each of the characters start with a differing amount of money, and some characters come equipped with a weapon. Between races, the player can converse with other bikers and receive gameplay tips. The Windows version features an online multiplayer mode for up to eight human players connected via a modem or local network.

== Development and release ==
Following the successful release of Road Rash II, EA began simultaneous development on a Road Rash installment for the 3DO Interactive Multiplayer and Sega CD and Road Rash 3 for the Sega Genesis. The Sega CD version was regarded as a "bridge product" between Road Rash 3 and the 3DO Road Rash. EA was a partner of The 3DO Company, which was formed by EA co-founder Trip Hawkins, and would support the 3DO console with exclusive software based on its most popular franchises, including Road Rash. EA was influenced by the arrival and technology of the PlayStation and the CD-i to push for a more cinematic and realistic look, which led to the concept of digitized motorcycle racers. Road Rash features character sprites that have been digitized from a live-action cast largely consisting of the game's crew members; Road Rash co-creator Randy Breen portrayed the game's motor officers. The game features 25 minutes of live-action full-motion video. The footage was directed by Rod Gross, and the motorcycle riders were portrayed by a combination of the game's staff and local AFM racers in the area. The yellow Yamaha FZR1000 seen in the videos was Breen's own bike and was previously featured on the cover of Road Rash II. A red Ducati SuperSport 900, rented from a local company, was scratched in a botched stunt during the last day of filming. Since the motorbike could not be returned, EA's marketing division used it for trade shows before setting it up for display in EA's corporate lobby.

Breen sought to make full use the CD format with the full-motion videos as well as a licensed soundtrack. Breen was particularly interested in incorporating the music of Soundgarden, of whom he was a fan. EA's marketing director had a relationship with A&M Records, and contacted them for a bid to license Soundgarden's music for the 3DO version of Road Rash. A&M initially declined the offer due to a lack of familiarity with the 3DO platform and unwillingness to formulate a new deal structure for licensed music in video games, but changed its position after Soundgarden's members expressed enthusiasm for the series and saw potential in licensing music to video games. Seeking to "control the audio landscape", A&M obtained the band's permission to use them as leverage to incorporate other alt-rock bands within the A&M label into the game, including Monster Magnet, Paw, Swervedriver, Therapy? and Hammerbox. Each band was allowed to keep their share of the royalties on a non-recoupment basis, which would amount to half the revenue received by A&M from EA. The deal would prove lucrative for the bands involved, and A&M received an assortment of "promotional goodies" from EA. The Sega CD version is the only one in which the licensed tracks play during races, while the other versions feature an original score by Don Veca. The incidental music in the full-motion video cutscenes was composed by Marc Farley.

The 3DO version was showcased at the 1994 Summer Consumer Electronics Show and released in July 1994, while the Sega CD version was released exclusively in North America in March 1995. In June 1995, Atari Corporation struck a deal with EA in order to bring select titles from their catalog to the Atari Jaguar CD, with Road Rash being among the selected titles to be ported. These titles, along with Road Rash, went unreleased. A version of Road Rash for the Panasonic M2 was announced but never released due to the system's cancellation. The PlayStation version's development was announced in July 1995, and the PlayStation, Sega Saturn and Microsoft Windows versions were respectively released in North America in February, on June 26, and on September 27 in 1996. The Saturn version was released in Europe on July 26.

On November 5, 2026, Electronic Arts re-released the 1996 Windows version of Road Rash as Road Rash: 30th Anniversary Edition on Steam, GOG.com, and the EA app, marking the version's first digital release. The anniversary edition features restored and upscaled full-motion video sequences, a relicensed soundtrack, native controller support, and gameplay at up to 60 frames per second.

== Reception ==
=== 3DO version ===
Reception (3DO version)

Review scores
Publication	Score
AllGame	4/5
Computer and Video Games	91%
Electronic Gaming Monthly	84%
Famitsu	27/40
GamePro	20/20
Next Generation	4/5
VideoGames	8.25/10
3DO Magazine	5/5

The 3DO version of Road Rash was met with critical acclaim, and is widely regarded as the pinnacle of the series. The most common points of praise among critics were the advanced texture-mapped graphics (which Rik Skews of Computer and Video Games described as a more polished Crash 'n Burn) and the grunge soundtrack (which a reviewer for Next Generation said lent an "in-your-face" attitude to the game). Additionally, Bacon of GamePro commended the branching routes and humorous full motion video sequences, although he criticized the lack of a multiplayer option. Iceman of Electronic Gaming Monthly and the Next Generation reviewer both felt that the gameplay eventually became repetitive. While Skews and co-reviewer Deniz Ahmet acknowledged the responsiveness of the controls, Chris Gore of VideoGames pointed out the inability to configure them as a major flaw.

In the United States, Road Rash was the highest-selling 3DO title at Babbage's in its debut month, and would stay within the top ten highest-selling 3DO titles for the next three months. In the United Kingdom, it topped HMV's 3DO sales charts for three consecutive months. The game won several awards from Electronic Gaming Monthly in their 1994 video game awards, including Best Driving Game, Best Music in a CD-Based Game, and Best 3DO Game of 1994. GameFan awarded Road Rash the title of "Driving/Racing Game of the Year" in their 1994 Golden Megawards. Flux placed the 3DO version of Road Rash at #22 in its "Top 100 Video Games" list. In her review of the Saturn version, Sam Hickman of Sega Saturn Magazine said the 3DO version was "one of the best games of its time on any system ... Still the best version, even one year or so on". Gary Mollohan of Official U.S. PlayStation Magazine and Brett Elston of GamesRadar+ credited the 3DO version of Road Rash with revolutionizing the use of licensed music in video games. In Electronic Gaming Monthly's "Greatest 200 Video Games of Their Time" list, the 3DO version of Road Rash was ranked at #145. In 1996, GamesMaster ranked the 3DO version 7th on their "The GamesMaster 3DO Top 10".

=== Other versions ===
Reception (Other versions)

Review scores
Publication	Score
AllGame	SAT: 3/5
Computer Gaming World	PC: 3/5
Electronic Gaming Monthly	PS: 7/10
GameFan	SCD: 220/300
GamePro	SCD: 17.5/20; PS: 16.5/20; SAT: 14.5/20
GameSpot	PC: 6.3/10
IGN	PS: 5/10
Next Generation	SCD, PS: 3/5
Flux	SCD: B
Game Players	PS: 73% SCD: 62%
Maximum	PS: 2/5
Mean Machines Sega	SAT: 77% SCD: 74%
Sega Saturn Magazine	SAT: 78%

The Sega CD version was met with a mixed reception. Critics were largely disappointed by the downgraded visuals compared to the 3DO version, and some felt that the series was becoming rehashed and dated compared to competitors such as Virtua Racing. Angus Swan and Steve Merrett of Mean Machines Sega appreciated the emulation of the 3DO version's presentation visuals, and Jeff Kitts of Flux pointed out that the licensed music functioned during races, which he felt gave the Sega CD version its sole advantage over the 3DO version. Road Rash was awarded second place in the "Best Sega CD Game" category of GamePro's 1995 Editors' Choice Awards (behind Earthworm Jim: Special Edition).

The PlayStation, Saturn and Windows ports were less well-received than the 3DO version. Reviewers for Electronic Gaming Monthly, IGN, Next Generation and Maximum all criticized the PlayStation port for only having minor enhancements to the graphics and sound, with no changes to gameplay that had become outdated and outclassed by more recent racing games in the years since Road Rash was first released. Roger Burchill of Game Players, while naming the PlayStation version "the best looking and best sounding incarnation of the game to date", also pointed out the lack of innovation in the gameplay, and derided the full-motion videos as "lame". GamePro's Air Hendrix, however, felt that the gameplay remained exciting, and though he remarked that the controls are stiffer than on previous versions, he gave the PlayStation version a wholehearted recommendation.

Air Hendrix and Sam Hickman both commented that the Saturn version, while good fun on its own terms, offers nothing not already seen in the 3DO and PlayStation versions, and falls short of those versions in some technical aspects, making it rather outdated for the time of its release. Marcus Hearn and Angus Swan of Mean Machines Sega said that while the premise of Road Rash was "novel", the Saturn version was rendered unremarkable by "samey and uneventful" scenarios, small sprites, unsophisticated animation, "inappropriate" music, and "extremely annoying" full-motion videos.

Mark East of GameSpot considered the Windows version to be identical to the 3DO version apart from its online multiplayer mode, which he said "does add a lot to the game". He also felt that its grunge soundtrack was somewhat outdated, and lambasted the in-game score as "the world's cheesiest General MIDI music". Gordon Goble of Computer Gaming World approved of the grunge soundtrack, graphics, and the entertainment value of the combat, but was annoyed by a conflict between the game, his sound cards and the OS's DirectDraw that would consistently return him to the desktop without warning, and deemed the title to be "too much periphery, too little game".
