= Road Rash II =

1992 video game

- Developer: Electronic Arts (Note: Ported to Game Boy Color by 3d6 Games)
- Publisher: Electronic Arts
- Director: Kevin McGrath
- Producer: Randy Breen
- Designers: Randy Breen; Dan Geisler
- Programmers: Dan Geisler; Matthew Hubbard; Walt Stein
- Artists: Peggy Brennan; Keith Bullen; Arthur Koch; Matthew Sarconi
- Writer: Jamie Poolos
- Composers: Rob Hubbard; Don Veca
- Series: Road Rash
- Platforms: Sega Genesis/Mega Drive, Game Boy Color
- Release: Genesis/Mega Drive: NA/EU: December 1992; Game Boy Color: NA: November 8, 2000; UK: December 15, 2000
- Genres: Racing, vehicular combat
- Modes: Single-player, multiplayer

Road Rash II is a 1992 racing and vehicular combat video game developed and published by Electronic Arts (EA) for the Sega Genesis. The game is centered around a series of motorcycle races throughout the United States that the player must win to advance to higher-difficulty races, while engaging in unarmed and armed combat to hinder the other racers. It is the second installment in the Road Rash series and introduces a split-screen two-player mode for competing human players, nitrous oxide charges on certain bikes, and chains as offensive weapons.

EA began development of Road Rash II before the end of the 1991 Christmas season, and the game was released before the end of the 1992 Christmas season. Road Rash II met with critical acclaim and commercial success, with reviewers appreciating the visuals and addition of the multiplayer mode while pointing out the lack of innovation in the fundamental gameplay. A conversion for the Game Boy Color was developed by 3d6 Games and released under the title Road Rash in 2000. The game saw additional releases on the PlayStation Portable compilation title EA Replay in 2006 and on the Sega Genesis Mini in 2019.

== Gameplay ==
An example of two-player gameplay in the Genesis version of Road Rash II. The game's larger cartridge size compared to its predecessor allowed the feature to be introduced in this installment of the series.

Road Rash II puts the player in control of a motorcycle racer who must finish in third place or higher among fourteen other racers; the player advances throughout the game's five levels by winning five races on each level. The game's races take place in a number of settings across the United States, consisting of Hawaii, Arizona, Tennessee, Alaska, and Vermont. During a race, the racer can brake, accelerate, and attack neighboring opponents. The racer will punch at the nearest opponent with a default input, while holding a directional button during the input will result in either a backhand or a kick. Some opponents wield weapons such as clubs and chains, which can be taken and used by the racer if the opponent is attacked as they are holding the weapon out to strike. The racer can be ejected from their bike if they crash into an obstacle (such as boulders, cars, deer, and cows) or if they run out of stamina (shown in the bottom-left corner of the screen) due to fights with opponents. In this event, the racer will automatically run back toward their bike, though the player can alter their course and avoid incoming traffic with the directional buttons, or stand still by holding the brake input button. Opponents will likewise be ejected from their bike if their own stamina is depleted. The stamina of the nearest opponent is visible within the bottom-right corner of the screen, and the color of both stamina meters change from green to red as they deplete.

The racer begins the game with $1,000 and earns cash prizes for each successful race. The player can access a shop from the game's main menu to view bikes of differing weights, speeds, and steering capabilities, and the player may purchase a new bike with the money they have accumulated. Certain bikes are equipped with a series of nitrous oxide charges, which can provide a burst of speed if the player quickly taps the acceleration input button twice. The player will receive a password at the end of a successful race, which can be entered at a password entry screen in a subsequent session to maintain the player's progress. The player will advance to the next level after winning a race on all five of the game's tracks. With each subsequent level, the cash prizes become higher, the courses become longer, and the opponents become more aggressive. The player wins the game by winning a race on each track in all five levels.

The bike has its own "condition meter" between the racer's and opponents' stamina meters, which decreases every time the racer suffers a crash. The bike will be wrecked if the meter fully depletes, which ends the player's participation in the current race and deducts the cost of a repair bill from the racer's balance. Police officers make sporadic appearances throughout the game's tracks, and can also end the player's participation if they apprehend the racer following a crash, which deducts the cost of a fine from their balance. With each subsequent level, repair bills and fines become more expensive, and officers appear more frequently. If the racer lacks the funds to cover either a repair bill or a fine, the game will end prematurely.

Road Rash II features a two-player mode that can either be played intermittently between players or simultaneously with the use of a split-screen display. Two players can either race against each other along with other computer-controlled racers or engage in the "Mano a Mano" mode, in which the two human players are the only competing racers on the track. In this mode, the players can select a weapon to wield prior to the start of the race, and no money is won or lost, though officers still appear as an obstacle and can end the race if they apprehend one of the players. The Game Boy Color version also features a two-player mode via use of the Game Link Cable.

== Development and release ==
Before the conclusion of the 1991 Christmas season, EA decided to create a sequel to Road Rash, and set a deadline for the following Christmas. Although the development team considered the deadline tight given the length of the previous game's development, the established framework given by the preceding title allowed the team to focus on enhancing the gameplay and visuals for the sequel. The development team of Road Rash II consisted of three programmers, five graphic artists, and four track builders. Returning crew members from the previous game include producer and designer Randy Breen, designer and programmer Dan Geisler, programmer Walt Stein, and artists Arthur Koch and Peggy Brennan. Carl Mey, the technical director of the original Road Rash, was promoted to Director of Technology at EA following the first game's development, and thus had limited involvement with the sequel. Mey's game director position was inherited by Kevin McGrath, and Mey would leave EA to work for Sega before the conclusion of Road Rash II's development.

Breen expanded the sequel's setting to explore the United States outside of the Californian settings of the previous game. Breen explained that he "was trying to maintain a certain progression through the fantasy of the product, which was that the first Road Rash was a roots-oriented thing. It happened locally, and people would run these races surreptitiously and do them in back roads where nobody knew about them – kind of a fight club thing. And they gradually expanded outward". For the game's locations, some of the artists incorporated photos by reducing their colors, while others used the photos as reference and drew the locations from scratch. Road Rash II introduced the chain as an offensive weapon. To create reference material for the body mechanics of swinging a chain, Koch filmed himself performing the action. The expansion to an 8-megabit format from the original game's 5 megabits allowed the team to implement a split-screen two-player mode that they were unable to incorporate into the preceding title. The two-player split screen took Geisler approximately three months to create. Road Rash II includes cutscenes that play at the end of a race, which were conceptualized as a reward based on the player's performance. The cutscenes were roughly storyboarded and created by Koch in low resolution to fit within the console's memory. The characters in the cutscenes were ten pixels tall and informally referred to by the development team as "little dudes".

The artificial intelligence of the opponent racers was improved to be less predictable and more individualistic; certain racers would be more focused on the road than on the human racer, while others would be more aggressive. The motor officers were also enhanced with the ability to take damage and fight back against the player, after previously being immune to player attacks and restricted to bumping against racers in the first game; Koch claimed that "Road Rash II was the first game in which you could beat, and get beaten, by a cop". Controversy surrounded this feature due to the recent beating of Rodney King, which made the development team uncertain on its incorporation. Some potential new features that were omitted due to hardware limitations include weather conditions and a Harley-Davidson-style bike. The game's audio was created by Rob Hubbard, Don Veca, and Tony Berkeley. The game's character banter and instruction booklet were written by Jamie Poolos. The yellow Yamaha FZR1000 featured on the cover was Breen's own bike, and would later be featured in the full-motion videos of the 32-bit versions of Road Rash in 1994.

Road Rash II was released in North America and Europe in December 1992. Versions for the Master System and Game Gear were announced in December 1994, but were not released. The Game Boy Color version was developed by 3d6 Games, with graphics created by Stoo Cambridge. This version is simply titled Road Rash despite being a conversion of the second title. The game was released in North America on November 8, 2000, and in the United Kingdom on December 15, 2000, and features Game Link support. The Genesis version of Road Rash II, along with the original Road Rash and Road Rash 3, was included in the PlayStation Portable compilation title EA Replay in 2006. Road Rash II was one of the titles for inclusion on the Sega Genesis Mini console, which was released on September 19, 2019.

== Reception ==
Reception

Review scores
Publication	Score
Electronic Gaming Monthly	31/40 (GEN); 8/10 (GBC)
GameFan	93%
GamePro	18.5/20
Mean Machines Sega	93%
MegaTech	89%
Mega Zone	92%
Sega Force	85%

Road Rash II met with critical acclaim upon release. Skid and Brody of Diehard GameFan praised the general improvements to the gameplay, particularly the addition of the two-player mode. Richard Leadbetter and Radion Automatic of Mean Machines Sega commended the two-player mode, additional bikes, fast visuals and varied backgrounds, but felt that the fundamental gameplay was barely changed from the previous title, and they considered the music to be inferior to that of the original game. Gideon of GamePro was grateful for the inclusion of the split-screen two-player mode, the lack of which he felt "kept the first Road Rash from achieving 'instant classic' status", and deemed the sequel to be "a noteworthy improvement on an already excellent game". He additionally described the graphics as "sharp", "smooth and believable", and the musical themes as "hip". Anthony Mansour of Mega Zone approved of the addition of nitro charges and the ability to beat officers. Brian Costelloe of the same publication attributed the game's addictive quality to the increased challenge, and welcomed the additions of the chain and two-player mode, but found difficulty in recommending the title to those who already own the first game. Paul Wooding and Adrian Pitt of Sega Force warned readers of the game's similarity to its predecessor, but praised the multiplayer modes as "magic" and the sense of speed and graphic effects as "amazing". The four reviewers of Electronic Gaming Monthly considered the gameplay to still be solid and fun, but saw little difference in that factor from its predecessor, and were disappointed in the lack of detail in the two-player mode's graphics compared to the single-player campaign, though the audio was said to "really pop".

Sales of Road Rash II exceeded those of its predecessor. In its debut month, Road Rash II was the sixth highest-selling Genesis title at Babbage's, and stayed within the top-ten chart for the next six months. Road Rash II first charted on Blockbuster Video's highest-renting Genesis titles at #7, and charted within the top ten on five subsequent months. Mega placed the game at #19 in their Top Mega Drive Games of All Time, and the game has been included in "greatest games of all time" lists by Stuff and FHM.

Shawn Smith of Electronic Gaming Monthly wrote positively of the Game Boy Color version; he praised the "awesome" scaling effect on the tracks as the game's most impressive feature, and commended its "surprisingly solid" controls and level of challenge, but pointed out that the tracks were largely similar to each other, which led to eventual boredom.

Sales of Road Rash II exceeded those of its predecessor. In Europe, it was ranked as the second best-selling home video game release of 1992, behind Sonic the Hedgehog 2.
