= Full on the Mouth =

American rock band (1992–2000)

- Origin: Flint, Michigan
- Genres: industrial rock; industrial metal; hard rock
- Years active: 1992–2000
- Labels: Pioneer Electronics; Atlantic
- Past members: Dwight Mohrman; Grant Mohrman; Andrew Barancik; Kerry Hilligus; Jon Knox; Ken Capton

Full on the Mouth was an American industrial rock band initially formed during 1992 under the name of Lost Tribe in Flint, Michigan. The band mainly consisted of vocalist Dwight Mohrman, guitarist Grant Mohrman, and bassist Andrew Barancik. They released one album with Pioneer Electronics, Collide, in 1998. After extensive touring, they then disbanded in 2000.

== History ==
=== Formation, brief career as Lost Tribe, and involvement with Leaderdogs for the Blind (1992–1995) ===
Brothers Dwight and Grant Mohrman formed a grunge band, Lost Tribe, in 1992. They recruited drummer Ken Capton and bassist Andrew Barancik into the lineup soon after. Lost Tribe self-released the Geared to Groove EP in 1992, which notably featured a guest verse by actor and football player Terry Crews. Capton departed from the band soon after, and the remaining three members decided to stay together.

In 1993, they joined the christian rock band, Leaderdogs for the Blind, which was a solo project by guitarist Lyndon Perry. They were also joined by vocalist Derek Cilibraise. Leaderdogs for the Blind released one album, Lemonade, in 1995 on R.E.X. Music. Shortly afterwards, the band split up, although the trio of Barancik and the Mohrman brothers decided to stick together again. They continued their previous Lost Tribe project, but due to the band's interest in the electronica and industrial genres, they changed the name to Full on the Mouth in 1996.

=== Renaming to Full on the Mouth, major label signing, and recording of Collide (1996–1997) ===
During the 1990s, Grant Mohrman was the studio manager of the long-running recording facility Pearl Sound Studios in Canton, Michigan. He worked in the studio alongside numerous artists, such as Stevie Wonder, Eminem, Patti Smith, Republica, Filter, Warrior Soul, among others. One of the studio's employees, Michael "Blumpy" Tuller, had introduced Grant Mohrman to various electronic acts, which he then brought to the other band members in Full on the Mouth. In 1996, Full on the Mouth released a cassette single of the song "Rainbow". It sold over 4,000 copies and was eventually picked up by a radio station in Michigan. Pioneer Electronics, who were looking to expand as a music label in conjunction with Atlantic Records, heard the single and decided to sign Full on the Mouth. The band played one of their first major shows in July 1997, Chicago's New Music Festival, which featured approximately 100 bands performing over two days.

Full on the Mouth entered the studio later on in 1997 to record their full-length debut album, entitled Collide. Various individuals were involved in the process. Grant Mohrman and Blumpy had co-produced the album together, and Blumpy also provided various keyboards and percussion. Bernie Leadon, founding member of the Eagles, contributed guitar to one track on the album, and also assisted with production on four other tracks as well. Leadon was also the band's representative for a brief period of time. Ben Grosse (who was known for his mixing duties with Filter, Lush, Republica, Econoline Crush, and numerous other bands) also mixed one song on Collide. Since the band started as a trio while relying on a drum machine, they brought in drummer Jon Knox for the album's sessions. Overall, the album was conceived in six different studios.

=== Extensive touring and eventual disbandment (1998–2000) ===
Although Knox was initially the band's drummer during the sessions of Collide, he ultimately did not join the group for a tour. Kerry Hilligus was instead brought in to be the band's live drummer. Full on the Mouth embarked on a headlining tour of the U.S. in early 1998 to support the release of Collide, which was released in February 1998. The album gained minor coverage in the U.S., such as peaking at #16 on The Gavin Report's Hard Rock chart and receiving two-and-a-half stars out of five from AllMusic. Both "Rainbow" and "People Mover" were released as the album's singles. "People Mover" in particular was released on the DVD format. The single prominently contained a 5.1 surround sound mix of the song in addition to the song's music video. Since Pioneer specialized in home entertainment, they had attempted to innovate with the then-new format; thus, "People Mover" became the first ever DVD single released to the public.

In May of 1998, the band served as the openers for Dream Theater as they toured behind their album Falling Into Infinity. The following month, two Full on the Mouth tracks appeared in the PlayStation racing game Road Rash 3D, "Another" and "People Mover (Omar Santana Remix)". "Another" and the original version of "People Mover" had previously appeared on Collide. A soundtrack was eventually released by Atlantic which featured the two songs, Road Rash 3D: The Album. In July, Full on the Mouth joined the 1998 iteration of the Warped Tour, although they departed from the tour later that same month. They then went on a brief tour with Drain S.T.H. afterwards.

Towards the end of 1998 and beginning of 1999, the band drastically reduced their touring schedule and thus they had only played minor sporadic shows. In the fall of 1999, the band's song "Another" off of Collide was featured in the Nintendo 64 racing game Road Rash 64 (which was initially developed as a straightforward port of the previous Road Rash 3D game but ended up being more unique overall). The song was prominently used as the backing music to the game's introduction. The band was mostly inactive for the second half of 1999, and by 2000, Grant Mohrman decided to open his own studio in Waterford Township, Michigan, named Method House. Due to his business ventures, Full on the Mouth officially disbanded that same year.

=== Subsequent activities (2001–present) ===
Grant Mohrman went on to work alongside numerous artists at Method House, with Celldweller as one of his most frequent collaborators. Method House also ventured into creating music for various entities, such as NCIS, Ford, Cadillac, Rob Dyrdek's Fantasy Factory, and many others. Dwight Mohrman departed from the music industry after 2000. He continued his career with production scheduling for large companies such as Jabil and Trelleborg AB. Barancik also eventually left the music industry, and he became a pastor for a christian church in Fenton, Michigan. He also became an independent filmmaker as well.

== Members ==
- Dwight Mohrman – lead vocals (1992–2000)
- Grant Mohrman – guitars, keyboards, background vocals (1992–2000)
- Andrew Barancik – bass, background vocals (1992–2000)
- Kerry Hilligus – drums (1997–2000)
- Jon Knox – drums (1997)
- Ken Capton – drums (1992–1993)

== Discography ==
=== Albums ===
- Collide (1998, Pioneer/Atlantic)

=== Singles and EPs ===
- Geared to Groove (1992, independent) (Note: Released under the Lost Tribe name.)
- "Rainbow" (1996, independent)
- "Rainbow" (1998, Pioneer)
- "People Mover" (1998, Pioneer/Atlantic)
