= Road Rash 3 =

1995 video game

- Developer: Monkey Do Productions
- Publisher: Electronic Arts
- Director: Nana Chambers
- Producer: Randy Breen
- Designers: Steve Murray; Mike Lopez; David Costa; Aaron McClay; Mike Hensley
- Programmers: Dan Geisler; Warren Holfeld
- Artists: Michael Shirley; Michael Hulme; Lara Bowen; Peggy Brennan; Sung Moon Kwon; Barbara Meyers; Irene Pena; Jeffery Stokol
- Writers: Jamie Poolos; Bill Scheppler; Marti McKenna; David Lee; Valerie Hanscom; Paul Armatta
- Composer: Don Veca
- Series: Road Rash
- Platform: Sega Genesis
- Release: EU: March 11, 1995; NA: March 1995
- Genres: Racing, vehicular combat
- Modes: Single-player, multiplayer

Road Rash 3 is a 1995 racing and vehicular combat video game originally published by Electronic Arts (EA) for the Sega Genesis. It is the fourth installment in the Road Rash series and the last to be released for the Genesis. The game is centered around a worldwide series of motorcycle races that the player must win to advance to higher-difficulty races, while engaging in unarmed and armed combat to hinder the other racers.

Development of Road Rash 3 began after series programmer Dan Geisler experienced frustration working on Michael Jordan: Chaos in the Windy City and offered to make a new Road Rash title instead. The game's worldwide settings were influenced by the need for a significant new feature despite the Genesis's technology having been pushed to its limit. The game was positively received by critics and commercially successful; critics appreciated the refined gameplay and visuals, but pointed out a lack of innovation, and had mixed reactions to the audio.

== Gameplay ==
Gameplay screenshot

Road Rash 3 puts the player in control of a motorcycle racer who must finish in third place or higher among fourteen other racers; the player advances throughout the game's five levels by winning five races on each level. The game's races take place in a number of settings around the world, consisting of Australia, Kenya, Japan, Italy, Brazil, Germany, and the United Kingdom. During a race, the racer can brake, accelerate, and attack neighboring opponents. The racer will punch at the nearest opponent with a default input, while holding a directional button during the input will result in either a backhand or a kick. Some opponents wield weapons such as clubs, chains, nunchaku, crowbars, mace, cattle prods, and oil cans, which can be taken and used by the racer if the opponent is attacked as they are holding the weapon out to strike. The racer can carry multiple weapons at once and cycle through them to select a weapon for use. The mace, cattle prod, and oil can are limited to ten charges each, and will be discarded when all charges have been used. The racer can be ejected from their bike if they crash into an obstacle or if they run out of stamina (shown in the bottom-left corner of the screen) due to fights with opponents. In this event, the racer will automatically run back toward their bike, though the player can alter their course with the directional buttons, or stand still by holding the brake input button. Opponents will likewise be ejected from their bike if their own stamina is depleted; the stamina of the nearest opponent is visible within the bottom-right corner of the screen.

The racer begins the game with $1,000 and earns cash prizes for each successful race. The player can access a shop from the game's main menu to view bikes of differing weights, speeds, and steering capabilities, and the player may purchase a new bike with the money they have accumulated. Certain bikes are equipped with a series of nitrous oxide charges, which can provide a burst of speed if the player quickly taps the acceleration input button twice. The player can also upgrade their current bike in four areas: engine performance, chassis endurance, tires, and suspension. A bike can only be upgraded once in each area. The player will receive a password at the end of a successful race, which can be entered at a password entry screen in a subsequent session to maintain the player's progress. The player will advance to the next level after winning a race on five of the game's seven tracks.

The bike has its own "damage gauge" between the racer's and opponents' stamina meters, which decreases every time the racer suffers a crash. The bike will be wrecked if the meter fully depletes, which ends the player's participation in the current race and deducts the cost of a repair bill from the racer's balance. Motor officers make sporadic appearances throughout the game's tracks, and can also end the player's participation if they apprehend the racer following a crash, which deducts the cost of a fine from their balance. The appearance of a police helicopter signifies the nearby presence of a motor officer, and the helicopter will attempt to strike the racer with its landing rails and make them vulnerable to the upcoming officer. If the racer lacks the funds to cover either a repair bill or a fine, they will respectively be asked to continue as a repo man for the shop or a snitch for the police. In either case, the racer will be given the task of apprehending a wanted opponent by making them crash and pulling over next to them. To aid in this mission, the shop owner will provide the racer with a crowbar, while the police will provide a club. The wanted opponent stands out from the others by wearing differently colored leathers. Successful apprehension of the wanted opponent will result in the racer's repair bill or fine being waived, while failure will prematurely end the game.

Road Rash 3 features a two-player mode that can either be played intermittently between players or simultaneously with the use of a split-screen display. Two players can either race against each other along with other computer-controlled racers or engage in the "Mano a Mano" mode, in which the two human players are the only competing racers on the track. In this mode, the players can select a weapon to wield prior to the start of the race.

== Development and release ==
Upon the completion of Road Rash II, series co-creator and programmer Dan Geisler planned to leave EA and accepted an employment offer from Crystal Dynamics; he was primarily motivated by inadequate compensation for his work on the first two titles, and he felt that the technology for the Genesis had been pushed as far as it could. Geisler only remained with EA after negotiating for a significant payment up front. During a frustrating experience working on Michael Jordan: Chaos in the Windy City, Geisler encountered EA Vice President of Marketing Bing Gordon and offered to create Road Rash 3, reasoning that it could be created faster and be more commercially successful, and Gordon accepted.

Road Rash 3 began development in March 1994, with Nana Chambers serving as director and series co-creator Randy Breen as producer. The game was developed in parallel with the 3DO version of Road Rash, and the two titles shared production assets as a result, particularly the gameplay sprites. Artist Michael Hulme was recruited from Cinemaware for the game's development team, and was told that Road Rash 3 would be EA's final title for the Sega Genesis. As EA's marketing division desired a "big new feature" for the game despite the Genesis's technology having been pushed to its limit, Hulme suggested worldwide settings as something that would "take [the series] someplace that people haven't been before", and he painted ten rough conceptual settings in four days, which were eventually whittled down to seven settings for the final game. The game's audio was created by Don Veca.

Road Rash 3 was showcased at the 1995 Winter Consumer Electronics Show and was released in Europe on March 11 that same year, followed by North America sometime around the same month. It was the final Road Rash game to be released for the Sega Genesis. A promotional sweepstake was run by GamePro and Best Buy the following month, in which contestants who filled and mailed an entry form were eligible to win a grand prize consisting of an all-expenses-paid trip for the winner and a guest to San Francisco in June to see a concert performance by Monster Magnet, one of the featured bands in the 3DO and Sega CD versions of Road Rash. The winner would meet the band backstage and receive an autographed copy of their latest album Dopes to Infinity, and would also receive a Sega Genesis console and a copy of Road Rash 3.

== Reception ==
Reception

Review scores
Publication	Score
Consoles +	89%
Computer and Video Games	83%
Game Players	77%
GamePro	18.5/20
Hyper	85%
Mean Machines Sega	82%
Mega Fun	79%
Next Generation	3/5
Super Game Power	4.3/5
Video Games (DE)	70%
VideoGames & Computer Entertainment	7/10
Play Time	79%
Sega Magazine	87/100
Sega Power	78%

Although Road Rash 3 lacked the critical acclaim of previous entries in the series, it was met with generally positive reviews. Bacon of GamePro voiced approval for the game's variety of weapons and tracks, and said that the tight controls complemented the bike-upgrading feature, though he criticized the unwieldy weapon-cycling mechanic, and felt that the two-player mode, while faster and more fluid than that of Road Rash II, was still twitchier and less responsive than the single-player campaign. He noted the enhanced realism of the visual details and scenery and the slickness of the sprites, but criticized the music as "annoyingly peppy" and described the sound effects as "often silly". Gary Lord of Computer and Video Games and Neil West of Game Players deemed Road Rash 3 to be essentially the same game as the previous entries in spite of its visual and gameplay enhancements. West considered the visuals to be dated despite the extra animations and scenery, and while he described the soundtrack as "nifty" and the sound effects as convincing, but questioned the absence of the grunge soundtrack from the 3DO entry. Gus Swan and Steve Merrett of Mean Machines Sega considered Road Rash 3 to be the fastest and most refined installment of the series, but also dated in comparison to Ridge Racer and Daytona USA, and they cited EA's previous title Skitchin' as a more effective and original take on the formula. Although they acknowledged the increased crispness and size of the graphics and the variety of the audio, Merrett saw the colors as "dreadfully washed out", and they derided the music as "sad Megadrive metal for people with acne and Bon Jovi T-shirts". Chris Gore of VideoGames declared Road Rash 3 to be "the best one yet" and praised the violent gameplay and realistic backgrounds, but felt the music was "okay". A reviewer for Next Generation applauded the game's inclusion of the animations and track layouts of the acclaimed 3DO version of Road Rash, as well as the new weapons and bike enhancer mode.

According to Randy Breen, Road Rash 3 outsold the previous Genesis titles. The game was the fourth-highest renting Genesis title at Blockbuster Video in its opening month, and charted within the top ten on five subsequent months; it re-entered the chart for three months in 1996, and for eleven months in 1997. In GamePro's "1995 Readers' Choice Awards", Road Rash 3 was voted "Best Racing Sim (16-Bit Games)", taking 55% of the vote.
