= Skitchin' =

1994 video game

- North American cover art
- Developer: EA Canada
- Publisher: Electronic Arts
- Director: Tim Brengle
- Producers: Stanley Chow; Sam Nelson
- Designer: David Warfield
- Programmers: Lance Wall; Daniel Wesley; Lee Ingraham
- Artists: Tony Lee; Jack Snowden; Cindy Green
- Composer: Jeff van Dyck
- Platform: Sega Genesis
- Release: EU: March 26, 1994; NA: April 1994
- Genre: Racing
- Modes: Single-player, multiplayer

Skitchin' is a 1994 racing video game developed and published by Electronic Arts (EA) for the Sega Genesis. The game puts the player in control of an inline skater who must win races in a tournament while engaging in unarmed and armed combat with other skaters and partaking in skitching, the act of clutching onto a moving vehicle's bumper to gain momentum.

Skitchin' was developed by EA's Canadian division, who repurposed the engine of the Road Rash series to capitalize on its success. The creation of the game's visuals involved rotoscoping an experienced skater and recruiting the services of teen-aged graffiti artists. The prominence of skitching in the game prompted EA to include a disclaimer warning of the activity's dangerous nature.

Skitchin' received positive reviews upon release, with reviewers recognizing the game's similarity to Road Rash. The game's conceptual novelty, visuals, and multiplayer mode were praised, while the lack of level variety was criticized, and the soundtrack divided critics.

== Gameplay ==
An example of gameplay in Skitchin'

Skitchin' puts the player in control of an inline skater competing in a tournament spanning twelve different cities, including Vancouver, New York City, and San Diego; the skater advances to the next race by finishing in fifth place or higher against a varying amount of opponents. During a race, the skater can accelerate, jump, crouch, attack neighboring racers, and engage in skitching, the act of clutching onto a moving vehicle's bumper to gain momentum. At any point while skitching, the skater can propel themself off the bumper, which can be used to "slingshot" to another vehicle or escape from an opponent skitching on the same vehicle, who will try to shove the skater off. Weapons such as nunchaku, chains, pipes, crowbars, whips, and baseball bats can be picked up off the road and used to attack opponent racers. Traffic cones on the side of the road may indicate a nearby weapon. Some opponents wield the aforementioned weapons, which can be taken and used by the skater if the enemy racer is attacked as they are holding the weapon out to strike. The skater can carry multiple weapons at once and cycle through them to select a weapon for use. The skater can also perform tricks after skating off a ramp if the player presses one of any button while the skater is midair. When a trick is successfully performed, a trio of judges momentarily appear in the lower-left corner of the screen to rank the trick's complexity.

The skater begins the game with $100, and earns more money by winning races, skitching on various cars, performing complex tricks, and knocking down opponents in combat. Each new race requires a fee to enter. Between races, the player can check the status of the skates, wheels and protective gear, which wear out over time, and can access a shop to purchase new equipment; the shop's merchant will decline any purchase that leaves the skater short of the next race's entry fee. Neglecting to replace worn out skates carries the risk of the skater suffering a "blowout" during a race, while crashing with worn out protective gear results in a hospital visit that requires the skater to pay a bill. The player will receive a password at the end of a successful race, which can be entered at a password entry screen in a subsequent session to maintain the player's progress. With each successful race, cars become faster and more difficult to skitch on, and opponents become more aggressive. Skitching on police cars rewards more money than ordinary cars, but puts the skater at risk of being apprehended and fined by the police.

Skitchin' features a two-player mode that can either be played intermittently between players or simultaneously with the use of a split-screen display. Two players can either race against each other along with other computer-controlled racers or engage in the "Head to Head" mode, in which the two human players are the only competing racers on the track. The "Tournament" mode allows three to eight human players to compete in a series of two-player head-to-head matches.

== Development and release ==
Skitchin' was developed by EA's Canadian division. It was conceptualized by Dave Ralston, designed by Dave Warfield, and directed by Tim Brengle. The game was programmed by Lance Wall, Daniel Wesley, and Lee Ingraham, while Tony Lee, Jack Snowden, and Cindy Green created the graphics. The game's engine was repurposed from the Road Rash series to capitalize on its success.

To collect reference material for the stunts seen in the game, the development team went to the Skate Ranch, a skating area in Toronto, where they were directed to Troy Manering, the community's reputed best skater. After the team rented a warehouse and set up a series of ramps, Snowden spent several days videotaping Manering performing a collection of moves, which were rotoscoped for the game's characters. For the game's graffiti art, the development team conducted an exhaustive tour of Toronto and photographed graffiti styles that they liked. After finding a phone number on one of the walls, the team came into contact with Carlos Zelaya, Zack Benwell, and Nelson Garcia. Because the trio were teenagers and unable to drive, the interview with them was conducted at a train station. The artists were impressed by the game's concept and suggested a grunge soundtrack during a visit to the EA Canada offices. The game's audio artist, Jeff van Dyck, was not initially knowledgeable of the genre, but developed a taste for it after being locked in a room and listening to a collection of CDs of bands from Seattle's grunge scene. The game's score consists of 16 tracks in total.

Due to the questionable legality of the activities depicted in the game and in response to the ongoing debate concerning violence in video games, the development team accessed the cartridge several times to temper or remove imagery that could be considered gratuitously violent. The game includes a disclaimer upon booting that warns players of the dangerous nature of the stunts and activities portrayed in the game and the risk of serious injury involved in attempting them.

Skitchin' was released in Europe on March 26 1994, and was released the following month in North America. A magazine advertisement for the game, which used the headline "Skatin', Hitchin', Bitchin', Skitchin'", was criticized for its use of profanity. EA associate publicist Fiona Murphy recounted, "The American Slang Dictionary defines the word bitchin' as 'good, excellent, superior.' Our use of the word was with this meaning in mind and was not intended as profanity. Skitchin' is an action-packed, hard-core street game, and we felt the word bitchin' in the headline ... reflected the attitude of the game and also conveniently rhymed with Skitchin'."

== Reception ==
Reception

Review scores
Publication	Score
Computer and Video Games	82/100
Electronic Gaming Monthly	7/10, 5/10, 6/10, 5/10, 6/10
GamePro	19.5/20
Hyper	89%
Mean Machines Sega	78%
VideoGames & Computer Entertainment	6/10
Mega	80%

Reviews for Skitchin' were generally positive. Critics widely recognized the game's similarity to the Road Rash series, and some considered the use of the series formula for the sport of inline skating a novel concept, though the reviewers for Mean Machines Sega and Electronic Gaming Monthly felt that the novelty was short-lived. The two-player mode was appreciated, though Paul Mellerick of Mega noted that it ran slower than the single-player mode, and Nikos Constant of VideoGames wished that a four-player option was available. Mister Blister of GamePro and Gary Lord of Computer and Video Games found the skitching mechanic difficult to master, which Mister Blister attributed to a slightly sluggish controller input. Lord and Mean Machines Sega's Rob Bright criticized the low level variety, which Bright determined to result in a lack of lasting appeal.

The visuals were praised for their fluid scrolling, large and well-animated sprites, and detailed settings. Lord and the Mean Machines Sega reviewers, however, felt that the backgrounds were lackluster and lifeless. While Mister Blister and Hyper's Stretch Armstrong commended the graffiti art for adding to the game's feel, Constant was critical of the game's presentation, saying that "the game's use of slang is off and the graffiti looks lame". Critics were divided on the game's soundtrack; Mister Blister and Armstrong praised its variety and exhilarating nature, while the Mean Machines Sega reviewers dismissed its "lukewarm thrashy style" as being suitable for "those with defective tastes", and Constant derided the music as weak, remarking that "if you're going out skating, you're more likely to listen to Schoolly D or Rocket from the Crypt, not the lame boops, beeps and beats of a bad video-game soundtrack".

Skitchin' was Blockbuster Video's fifth-highest renting Sega Genesis title during the month of August 1997. In 2017, GamesRadar+ ranked the game 49th on its "Best Sega Genesis/Mega Drive games of all time" list.
