= Mario Andretti Racing =

1994 racing video game by EA Sports

- Cover art
- Developers: Stormfront Studios; High Score Productions
- Publisher: EA Sports
- Composer: Michael Bartlow
- Platform: Genesis
- Release: NA: 1994; EU: 1994
- Genre: Racing
- Mode: Single-player

Mario Andretti Racing is a video game that was released in 1994 on the Sega Genesis/Mega Drive. It was an early title in the newly created EA Sports line, and was developed by Stormfront Studios and High Score Productions. The game was produced by famed sports game developer Scott Orr as part of his collaboration with Richard Hilleman in the creation of EA Sports. Race driver Mario Andretti personally guided the development of the AI used by the non-player drivers in stock cars, Indy style open wheel racing, and dirt track racing.

The game uses different physics and AI for three kinds of racing.

The success of Mario Andretti Racing led Orr and Hilleman to work with Stormfront to launch the highly successful NASCAR Racing series.

In 1996, EA Sports released another game starring Andretti, called Andretti Racing, for the Sega Saturn and PlayStation. A PC version for Microsoft Windows followed in 1997.

== Reception ==
A review in Boys' Life said, "The surprise here isn't the ton of cool options like five camera views, customized racers and hard-nosed competitors. It's how well you can handle Mario's super autos with just a control pad."
