= The Mermen =

American rock band

- Origin: San Francisco, Santa Cruz, California, U.S.
- Genres: Psychedelic rock, surf rock
- Years active: 1989–present
- Labels: Mesa Blue Moon (Atlantic), Kelptone
- Members: Jim Thomas (guitar); Jennifer Burnes (bass); Martyn Jones (drums)
- Past members: Vince Littleton, 2000-2002 Prairie Prince, 1998–present (alt); Randy Clark, 1999-2000; Mike Silverman, 1999-2000 Allen Whitman, 1989-1998, 2004-2014
- Website: mermen.net

The Mermen are an American instrumental rock band from San Francisco, California formed in 1989. They have since moved to Santa Cruz, California.

The group's sound was originally rooted in surf and psychedelic rock music of the 1960s, although they have made "sincere attempts to get away from the surf music label" and currently delve into many genres, mainly driven by the melodic visions of the band's founder, songwriter, and guitarist Jim Thomas. The band's music is entirely instrumental and "does a good job of defying description". The Mermen perform as a power trio: electric guitar, electric bass, and drums, with occasional guests for live concerts. They were featured in the soundtrack of the PlayStation video game Road Rash 3D and have contributed music for films as well.

The 2010 album, In God We Trust, was their first release in a decade. It was followed in December 2012 by their first full-length Christmas release, "Do You Hear What I Hear - A Very MERMEN Christmas".

Thomas also fronts The Shitones, an associated band that features some of the same personnel (Jennifer Burnes on bass, and Shigemi Komiyama on drums prior to his 2014 death.) While Mermen feature Thomas's original compositions almost exclusively, the Shitones are a cover band that emphasizes instrumental rock hits of the 1950s and '60s by the likes of Link Wray and The Ventures, along with instrumental versions of songs by Neil Young, The Grateful Dead, Jimi Hendrix and others.

== Albums ==
- Krill Slippin' (1989)
- Food for Other Fish (1994)
- Live at the Haunted House (1995)
- A Glorious Lethal Euphoria (1995)
- Songs of the Cows (1996)
- Only You (1997)
- Sunken Treasure (1999)
- The Amazing California Health and Happiness Road Show (2000)
- In God We Trust (2010)
- Blues of Elsewhere (Jim Thomas solo) (2011)
- Do You Hear What I Hear - A Very MERMEN Christmas (2012)
- We Could See it in the Distance (2017)
- The Magic Swirling Ship (2017)
- A Murmurous Sirenic Delirium (2019)
- Splendeurs Et Miseres (2021)
