= MegaZone =

Australian video game magazine

- MegaZone #23, August 1992
- Categories: Video games
- Frequency: Bi-monthly (1988-1990); Monthly (1990-1995)
- First issue: July 1988
- Final issue: October 1995
- Company: MegaComp Publications (1988-1990); Sega Ozisoft (1990-1993); Mason Stewart Publishing (1993-1995)
- Country: Australia
- Language: English
- ISSN: 1321-8131

MegaZone was an Australian video game magazine which ran from July 1988 to October 1995, ultimately publishing 56 issues.

MegaZone started out as a bi-monthly, multi-platform magazine named MegaComp which was originally published by Elwood, Victoria–based MegaComp Publications. It later switched to a monthly format under the ownership of local software distributor Ozisoft (later Sega Ozisoft) and changed its name to MegaZone. In June 1993 the magazine switched its focus exclusively to Sega console software after being taken over by Mason Stewart Publishing. Later issues would be published under the name Sega MegaZone to denote its new focus.

Although ostensibly multi-platform in coverage prior to its acquisition by Mason Stewart, Sega Ozisoft used the magazine to promote titles they distributed in Australia, which included Commodore 64, Amiga and PC titles alongside games on Sega platforms, but none on Nintendo platforms as they were distributed by rival Mattel in the country. During this period subscribers to the magazine were also given a 20-page insert called SegaZone dedicated to Sega games, which was published on a quarterly basis until its content was merged with the main magazine.
