= Road Rash: Jailbreak =

2000 video game

- North American PlayStation box art
- Developers: EA Redwood Shores; Magic Pockets (GBA)
- Publisher: Electronic Arts
- Producer: Hunter Smith
- Artist: Daniel D. Wood
- Series: Road Rash
- Platforms: PlayStation, Game Boy Advance
- Release: PlayStation: NA: February 4, 2000; EU: August 6, 2000; Game Boy Advance: NA: September 15, 2003; EU: October 24, 2003
- Genre: Racing
- Modes: Single-player, multiplayer

Road Rash: Jailbreak is a racing video game developed by EA Redwood Shores for the PlayStation and Magic Pockets for the Game Boy Advance, and published by Electronic Arts for PlayStation in 2000 and for Game Boy Advance in 2003. It is the sixth and final game in the Road Rash series.

== Gameplay ==
The game plays similarly to previous games developed in the Road Rash series, which involves the player racing their motorcycle against other motorcyclists. Gameplay favors an arcade-like style, with little emphasis on realism. While racing, the player has the option of punching, or using weapons to attack other opponents, to slow down their progress. The ultimate goal is to place first in the race in order to earn points to upgrade the player's weapon and nitro. Conversely, the worst outcome is to finish last, which earns no points, or be stopped by police officers, which loses points.

Despite sharing many characteristics with past games in the series, Road Rash Jailbreak puts a stronger emphasis on the racing aspect of the game, and less on combat.

The individual courses for the game are pieced together from a larger system of interconnected grids of roads. Courses may overlap common segments of other tracks, but often have different start or end points, or have the player turning down alternate routes. The modes on Road Rash Jailbreak are: Jailbreak, Five-O, Time Trial, Cops and Robbers, Skull-to-skull, and Sidecar mode.

== Reception ==
Reception

Aggregate scores
Aggregator	Score	
Aggregator	GBA	PS
GameRankings	56%	70%
Metacritic	67/100	N/A

Review scores
Publication	Score	
Publication	GBA	PS
AllGame	N/A	3/5
CNET Gamecenter	N/A	7/10
Electronic Gaming Monthly	N/A	7/10 (Note: Four critics of Electronic Gaming Monthly gave the PlayStation version each a score of 7.5/10, 8/10, 6.5/10, and 6/10.)
EP Daily	N/A	7/10
Game Informer	4.5/10	7/10
GameFan	N/A	71%
GameRevolution	N/A	B−
GameSpot	7.3/10	7.7/10
IGN	7.9/10	7/10
Next Generation	N/A	2/5
Nintendo Power	2.9/5	N/A
Official U.S. PlayStation Magazine	N/A	2/5
The Cincinnati Enquirer	N/A	3/4

The Game Boy Advance version of Road Rash: Jailbreak received "average" reviews according to the review aggregation website Metacritic. Game Informer gave it an unfavorable review, over a month before it was released. Doug Trueman of NextGen said in his bottom line that the first Road Rash was still better than the PlayStation version. Air Hendrix of GamePro reviewed the PlayStation version, praising its "well-tuned" gameplay and an "engaging" variety of modes, and called the best Road Rash for that platform, but noted that the game will attract only the fans of franchise, while others will rent it. (Note: GamePro gave the PlayStation version three 4.5/5 scores for graphics, sound, and fun factor, and 4/5 for control in one review.) In another review, however, The D-Pad Destroyer called it "a fast, brutal and gritty game", but noted its "dirty" graphics and the "harsh" difficulty. (Note: GamePro gave the PlayStation version 3/5 for graphics, two 3.5/5 scores for sound and fun factor, and 4/5 for control in another review.)
