= Road rash =

Injury due to falling or sliding on asphalt

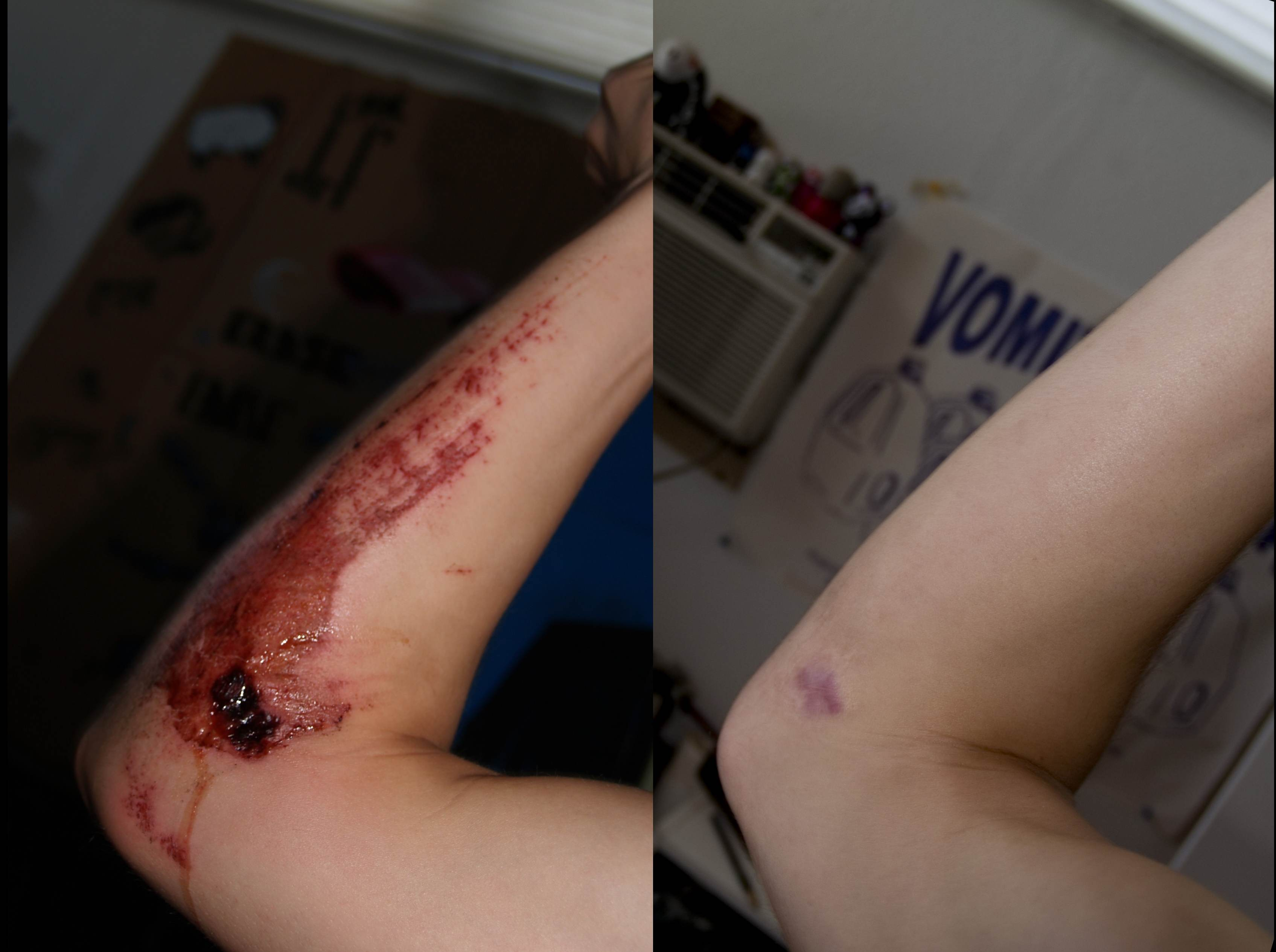
- Fresh road rash and its resultant scarring one year later
- Specialty: Dermatology

Road rash is a colloquial term for skin injury caused by abrasion with road surfaces, often as a consequence of cycling and motorcycling accidents. It may also result from running, inline skating, roller skating, skateboarding, and longboarding accidents.

The term may be applied to both a fresh injury and also to the scar tissue left by an old injury. Symptoms may include pain and heavy bleeding.

Motorcyclists can reduce the risks of road rash by wearing appropriate motorcycle personal protective equipment such as a full face helmet, protective clothing, gloves, dusters and boots. Similarly, inline skaters can reduce their chance of such abrasion injuries by wearing protective knee and elbow pads.

Road rash is often termed "gravel rash" in the United Kingdom. That term is old, appearing (with hyphen) as "gravel-rash" in Rudyard Kipling's Kim (1901). According to the OED it first appeared in print in Hotten's A Dictionary of Modern Slang, Cant, and Vulgar Words (2nd Ed, 1860).
