= Road Rash =

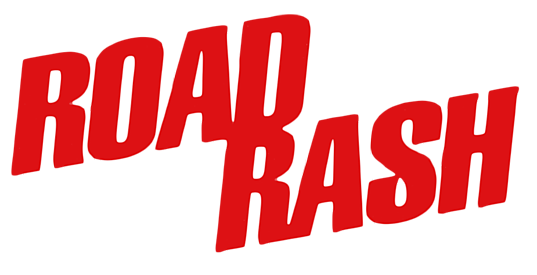
- Genres: Racing, vehicular combat
- Developers: Electronic Arts; Electronic Arts Mobile
- Publishers: Electronic Arts; Electronic Arts Mobile
- First release: Road Rash; September 1991
- Latest release: Road Rash (Java); 2009

Road Rash is a motorcycle racing video game series by Electronic Arts in which the player participates in violent, illegal street races. The series started on the Sega Genesis/Mega Drive and was released on various other systems over the years. The game's title is based on the slang term for the severe abrasive injuries that can occur in a motorcycle fall where skin comes into contact with the ground at high speed.

Six different games were released from 1991 to 2000, and an alternate version of one game was developed for the Game Boy Advance. The Sega Genesis trilogy was re-released in EA Replay for the PlayStation Portable. The series sold 3 million units by 1998.

== Games ==
=== Road Rash (1991) ===
Road Rash debuted on the Sega Genesis in 1991. The game takes place in California on progressively longer two-lane roads and two-player mode allows two people to play alternating. There are 14 other opponents in a race. A port of the game was released for the Amiga, and various scaled-down versions were made for Master System, Game Gear, and Game Boy. The Game Boy version is one of two licensed games that is incompatible with the Game Boy Color and newer consoles in the Game Boy line. A SNES version was planned and then canceled.

=== Road Rash II (1992) ===
Road Rash II was released in 1992 for the Sega Genesis. The sequel took the engine and sprites from the first game and added more content. The largest addition was proper two-player modes: "Split Screen" versus the other computer opponents, and the duel mode "Mano A Mano". The races take place all across the United States: Alaska, Hawaii, Tennessee, Arizona, and Vermont. The list of bikes has been increased to fifteen (separated into three classes, with the later ones featuring nitro boosts), and a chain was added to supplement the club. Other details include the navigation of the menu screens being considerably easier; and more manageable passwords, being less than half the size of the first game.

=== Road Rash (1994) ===
Road Rash was released in 1994 for CD-based platforms such as 3DO, Sega CD, PlayStation, Sega Saturn, and Microsoft Windows. It features a number of changes such as the ability to choose characters (with various starting cashpiles and bikes, some with starting weapons) before playing, fleshed-out reputation and gossip systems and full-motion video sequences to advance a plot. The game features all-California locales: The City, The Peninsula, Pacific Coast Highway, Sierra Nevada, and Napa Valley. The roads themselves feature brief divided road sections.

=== Road Rash 3 (1995) ===
Road Rash 3 was released in 1995 for the Sega Genesis. Races take place across the world, each level featuring five of seven total locales: Brazil, the United Kingdom, Germany, Italy, Kenya, Australia, and Japan. In addition to the standard fifteen bikes, four part upgrades are available for each. Eight weapons are available, and Road Rash 3 introduces the player's ability to hold on to weapons between races and the ability to accumulate multiple weapons.

=== Road Rash 3D (1998) ===
Road Rash 3D was released in 1998 for the PlayStation. Mostly, the game is not based on sprites. The race courses were pieced together from an interconnected series of roads. The game has less emphasis on combat and more on racing.

=== Road Rash 64 (1999) ===
Road Rash 64 was released in 1999 for the Nintendo 64. Electronic Arts did not design or publish it; the intellectual property rights were licensed to THQ, which in turn had its own Pacific Coast Power & Light (founded by former EA employee Don Traeger) develop the game.

=== Road Rash: Jailbreak (2000) ===
Road Rash: Jailbreak was released in 2000 for the PlayStation, with a handheld port released in 2003 for the Game Boy Advance with the same title. New features include an interconnected road system and two-player cooperative play with a sidecar.

=== Road Rash (2009) ===
Road Rash was released in 2009 for J2ME. It was sold on EA Mobile site only.

== Spiritual successors ==
A spiritual successor, Road Redemption, was released in 2017 for Microsoft Windows, MacOS, Nintendo Switch, PlayStation 4, and Xbox One, and later as Road Redemption Mobile for Android and iOS in 2022. Another spiritual successor, Road Rage, was released in 2017 for Microsoft Windows, PlayStation 4, and Xbox One.

== Music ==
The Sega Genesis trilogy features music by EA composers Rob Hubbard (1 and II), Michael Bartlow (1), Tony Berkeley (II), and Don Veca (II and 3). Later entries were among the first video games to include licensed music tracks from major recording artists in gameplay. The rock radio station in EA's 2004 game The Urbz is called "Road Rash FM".

== Future ==
Criterion Games considered developing a new Road Rash game multiple times, potentially a Burnout Versus Road Rash, but nothing came of it; they expressed a desire to move away from racing games in particular. Dan Geisler, main programmer and co-designer of the Sega Genesis trilogy, was working on a new title along with a number of the original Road Rash staff members (the game was then named Hard Rider: Back in the Saddle). He first announced it via a Reddit thread in 2012 and frequently mentioned progress on his Twitter account, but was unable to find funding for it and dropped the idea.
