= Earn to Die 2 =

2014 video game

- Developer: Toffee Games
- Publisher: Not Doppler
- Platforms: iOS, Android, Microsoft Windows
- Release: November 20, 2014; May 5, 2016 (PC)
- Genre: Racing
- Mode: Single-player

Earn to Die 2 is a game developed by Russian indie studio Toffee Games, which is the sequel to flash and mobile game Earn to Die. Earn to Die 2 sees a departure from the familiar desert setting of the original game, and delves into the depths of cities populated by zombies. Players have to get through the city in order to reach checkpoints and the finish to win the game level.

== Reception ==
Reception

Aggregate score
Aggregator	Score
Metacritic	iOS: 63/100

Review scores
Publication	Score
Pocket Gamer	2/5
TouchArcade	4/5

Critical reception for Earn to Die 2 has been mixed and the game holds a rating of 63/100 on Metacritic, signifying "mixed or average reviews". TouchArcade rated the game favorably and wrote "With the advance we've seen from E2D 1 to E2D 2, I think the future looks pretty bright for this game franchise, and there are some areas they could pretty smoothly transition into." Pocket Gamer was more critical of the game, describing the gameplay as being a "grind-fest."
