= Disc Drivin' =

2010 video game

- App icon
- Developer: Pixelocity Software
- Platform: iOS
- Release: December 13, 2010

Disc Drivin' is an iOS game developed by American studio Pixelocity Software LLC and released on December 13, 2010.

== Reception ==
Reception

Aggregate score
Aggregator	Score
Metacritic	85/100

Review score
Publication	Score
TouchArcade	4.5/5

The game has a Metacritic score of 85/100 based on five critic reviews.

Slide to Play wrote "Disc Drivin' is an addictive, turn-based multiplayer racer that will keep you flicking day in and day out." 148Apps said "Beyond these flaws, though, Disc Drivin' is easily one of the most addictive games I have ever played on iOS." AppSmile said "Replay value is terrific, with a variety of modes to enjoy and strategies to employ. " TouchArcade wrote "If Pixelocity can find a way to streamline matchmaking and add a friends list, and possibly even a single-player component for offline play, then Disc Drivin' could be really huge." Pocket Gamer said "Slow turn-based racing makes Disc Drivin' a mediocre game that lacks fun and excitement."
