= Touch Racing Nitro =

2010 video game

- Developer: Bravo Game Studios
- Publisher: Bravo Game Studios
- Platforms: iOS, PlayStation 3, PlayStation Portable, Android
- Release: iOS; March 29, 2010; Android; 2010; PSP: EU: March 23, 2011
- Genre: Racing
- Mode: Single-player

Touch Racing Nitro is a racing game developed and published by Bravo Game Studios for iOS and Android in 2010, and for PlayStation 3 and PlayStation Portable in 2011.

== Reception ==
Reception

Aggregate scores
Aggregator	Score
GameRankings	(iOS) 65% (PSP) 55%
Metacritic	(iOS) 64/100

Review scores
Publication	Score
Eurogamer	(PSP) 5/10
Jeuxvideo.com	(iOS) 14/20
PlayStation Official Magazine – UK	(PSP) 5/10
Pocket Gamer	3/5
TouchArcade	(iOS) 3.5/5

The iOS version received "mixed" reviews according to the review aggregation website Metacritic.
