= Tony Stewart =

American racing driver and team owner (born 1971)

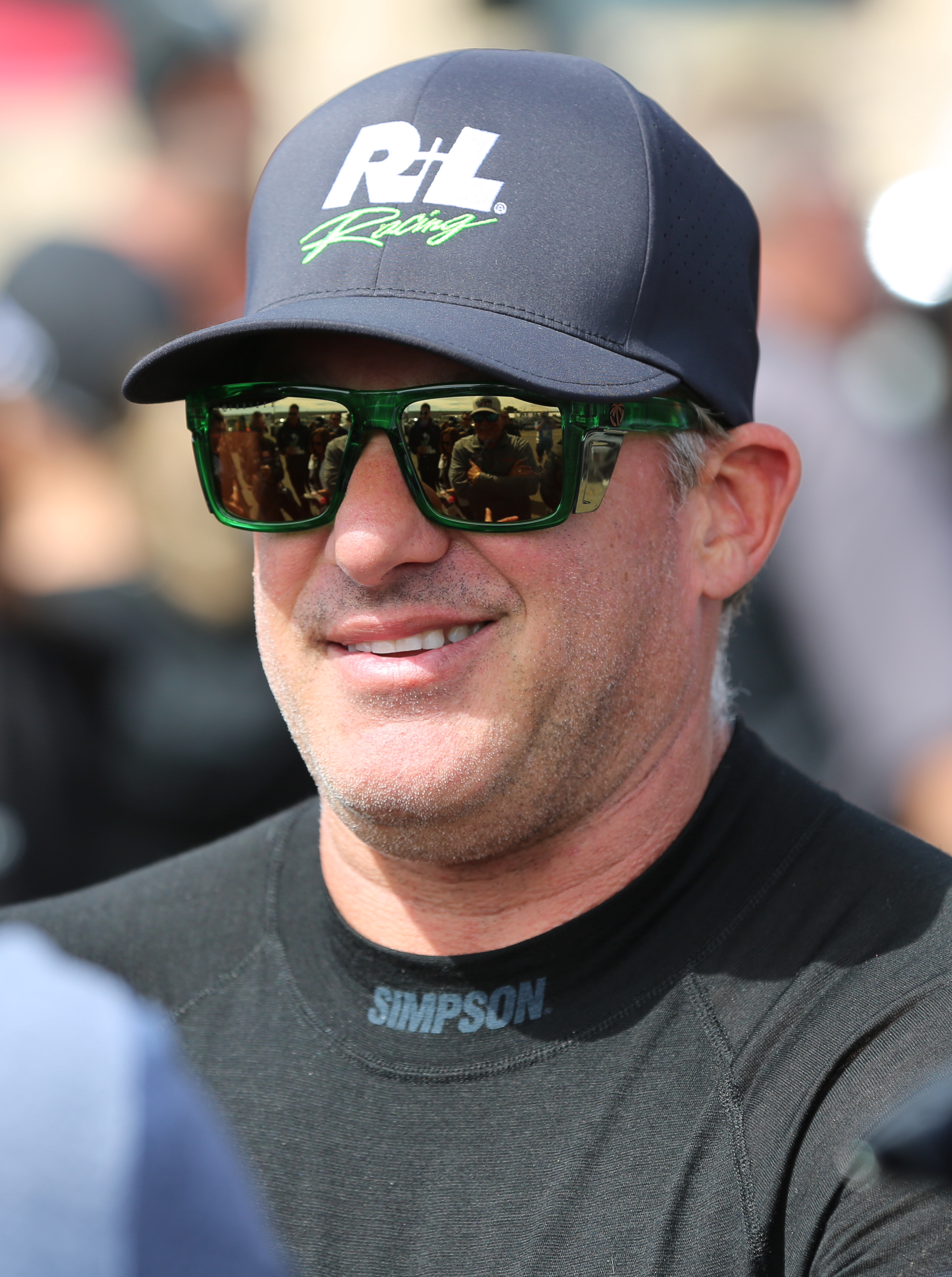
- Stewart at Sonoma Raceway in 2026
- Born: Anthony Wayne Stewart; May 20, 1971 (age 55); Columbus, Indiana, U.S.
- Height: 5 ft 9 in (1.75 m)
- Weight: 225 lb (102 kg)
- Achievements: 2002, 2005, 2011 NASCAR Cup Series Champion; 1997 IndyCar Series Champion; 1995 USAC Triple Crown Champion; 1994 USAC National Midget Series Champion; 2006 IROC champion 2021 SRX Series Champion; 2005, 2007 Brickyard 400 Winner; 2009 Sprint All-Star Race winner 2001, 2002, 2007 Budweiser Shootout Winner; 2006, 2008, 2009 Prelude to the Dream Winner; 2005, 2007, 2012 Gatorade Duel Winner; 2000 Turkey Night Grand Prix Winner; 2002, 2007 Chili Bowl Winner; 2014 NASCAR Cup Series Champion as co-owner 2017 Daytona 500 winner as co-owner 2025 NHRA Top Fuel Regular Season Champion; Has won with three separate manufacturers in NASCAR (Pontiac, Toyota, Chevrolet)
- Awards: 1999 Winston Cup Series Rookie of the Year; 1996 Indianapolis 500 Rookie of the Year; National Midget Auto Racing Hall of Fame (2001); USAC Hall of Fame (2016); Indianapolis Motor Speedway Hall of Fame (2018); Motorsports Hall of Fame of America (2019); NASCAR Hall of Fame (2020); National Sprint Car Hall of Fame (2022); Named one of NASCAR's 75 Greatest Drivers (2023); 2024 NHRA Mission Foods Drag Racing Series Rookie of the Year

NASCAR Cup Series career
- 618 races run over 18 years
- 2016 position: 15th
- Best finish: 1st (2002, 2005, 2011)
- First race: 1999 Daytona 500 (Daytona)
- Last race: 2016 Ford EcoBoost 400 (Homestead)
- First win: 1999 Exide NASCAR Select Batteries 400 (Richmond)
- Last win: 2016 Toyota/Save Mart 350 (Sonoma)
Wins	Top tens	Poles
49	308	15

NASCAR O'Reilly Auto Parts Series career
- 94 races run over 15 years
- 2013 position: 96th
- Best finish: 21st (1998)
- First race: 1996 Goody's Headache Powder 300 (Daytona)
- Last race: 2013 DRIVE4COPD 300 (Daytona)
- First win: 2005 Hershey's Take 5 300 (Daytona)
- Last win: 2013 DRIVE4COPD 300 (Daytona)
Wins	Top tens	Poles
11	41	6

NASCAR FedEx Freight Truck Series career
- 8 races run over 6 years
- 2026 position: 87th
- Best finish: 61st (2005)
- First race: 1996 Cummins 200 (IRP)
- Last race: 2026 Love's RV Stop 225 (Talladega)
- First win: 2002 Virginia Is For Lovers 200 (Richmond)
- Last win: 2003 Virginia Is For Lovers 200 (Richmond)
Wins	Top tens	Poles
2	5	0

NASCAR Canada Series career
- 1 race run over 1 year
- 2002 position: 11th
- Best finish: 11th (2002)
- First race: 2002 Canada Day Shootout (Cayuga)
Wins	Top tens	Poles
0	0	0

ARCA Menards Series career
- 3 races run over 3 years
- Best finish: 103rd (2002)
- First race: 2001 Federated Auto Parts 100 (DuQuoin)
- Last race: 2003 Southern Illinois 100 (DuQuoin)
- First win: 2003 Southern Illinois 100 (DuQuoin)
Wins	Top tens	Poles
1	3	3

IndyCar Series career
- 26 races run over 5 years
- Best finish: 1st (1997)
- First race: 1996 Indy 200 (Disney)
- Last race: 2001 Indianapolis 500 (Indianapolis)
- First win: 1997 Samsonite 200 (Pikes Peak)
- Last win: 1998 New England 200 (New Hampshire)
Wins	Podiums	Poles
3	7	8
- Statistics up to date as of November 6, 2026.

Anthony Wayne Stewart (born May 20, 1971), nicknamed "Smoke", is an American professional auto racing driver, and former NASCAR team co-owner of Stewart–Haas Racing. He competes in the NHRA Top Fuel class for Elite Motorsports. He is a four-time NASCAR Cup Series champion, winning two as a driver (2002, 2005), one as owner/driver (2011), and one as an owner (2014).

Throughout his racing career, Stewart has won racing titles in Indy, midget, sprint, and USAC Silver Crown cars. He is the only driver in history to win a championship in both IndyCar and NASCAR. Stewart became known for his hot temper and for his sarcasm with the media.

Stewart last competed full-time in the NASCAR Sprint Cup Series (now known as the NASCAR Cup Series) during the 2016 season, driving the No. 14 Chevrolet SS for his team, Stewart–Haas Racing, under crew chief Mike Bugarewicz. From 1999 to 2008, he drove the No. 20 Joe Gibbs Racing car, under crew chief Greg Zipadelli with The Home Depot as the primary sponsor. While driving for car owner Joe Gibbs, Stewart won two Cup Series championships in 2002 and 2005. In 2011, Stewart became the first owner-driver since Alan Kulwicki to win the Cup Series championship. Stewart is the only driver to win the Cup Series championship under the old points system and the chase playoff format, and is the only driver to win the title under three different sponsorships (Winston in 2002, Nextel in 2005, and Sprint in 2011). He is also the first driver in the Cup Series to win the championship by a tiebreaker. On May 22, 2019, Stewart was voted into the NASCAR Hall of Fame, and on January 31, 2020, was inducted alongside the 11th Hall of Fame class. On November 21, 2021, he married NHRA Top Fuel Drag Racer Leah Pruett. He replaced Pruett in Top Fuel for the 2024 season as Pruett stepped aside to start a family with Stewart.

== Racing career ==
=== Beginnings ===
Stewart got his first competitive go kart in Westport, Indiana in 1979. In 1980, he won his first championship. He grew up racing go karts and was successful very early, winning a World Karting Association championship in 1987. He moved up to the United Midget Racing Association (UMRA), where he raced TQ (three-quarter) midgets until 1991, when he again moved up, this time to the United States Auto Club (USAC) series with the help of one of his karting sponsors and friend Mark Dismore. Stewart was the USAC Rookie of the Year in 1991, USAC National Midget Series Champion in 1994 and 1995, and USAC Silver Crown Series champion in 1995.

=== IndyCar and NASCAR O'Reilly Auto Parts Series ===
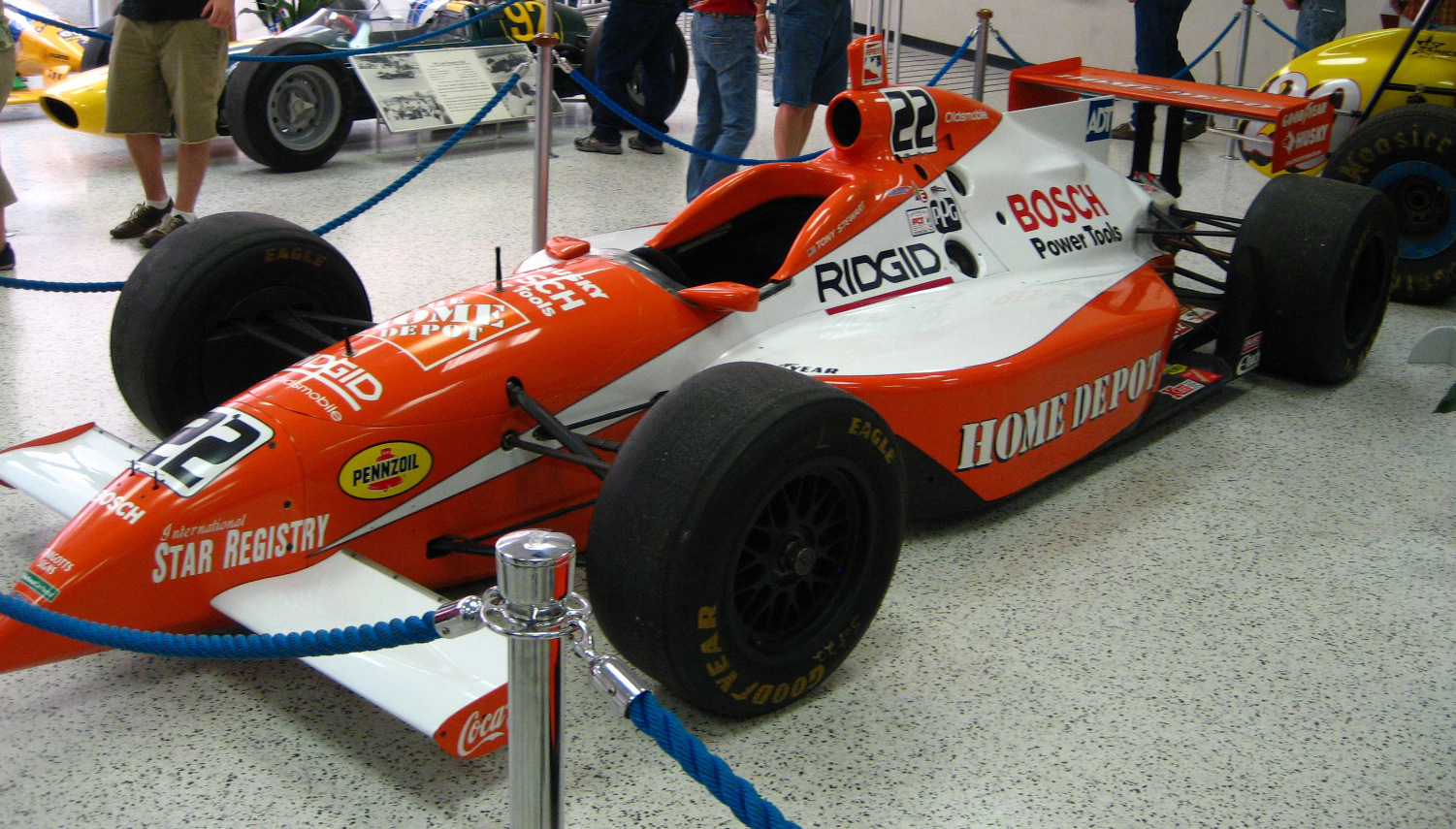
Stewart's 1999 Indianapolis 500 car

In 1995, Stewart became the first driver to win USAC's version of the Triple Crown, earning championships in all three of USAC's major divisions, National Midget, Sprint, and Silver Crown. His winning the Hut Hundred and 4 Crown Nationals were the highlights of the year. With the advent of the Indy Racing League (IRL), which intended to provide opportunities for grassroots racers, Stewart found his way into Indy car racing; after unsuccessful negotiations with A. J. Foyt Racing, he signed early in 1996 for Team Menard as a last-minute addition for the abridged three-race initial season. In his Indy car debut at Walt Disney World Speedway, Stewart led 37 laps and finished a close second to fellow rookie Buzz Calkins. He also led laps at Phoenix in the early stages before a myriad of pit stop woes and mechanical issues led to his early exit from the race.

For his Indianapolis 500 debut, Stewart initially qualified on the outside of the front row, but the disqualification of Arie Luyendyk's time and the death of his teammate Scott Brayton a week later propelled Stewart to the pole position. After leading 44 laps, his race ended before the halfway point due to a malfunctioning pop-off valve, which dropped him to 8th in the final point standings. When Stewart was not racing IndyCars, he raced stock cars, which he had signed to do beforehand. In 1996, he made his NASCAR Busch Series debut, driving for car owner Harry Rainer. In nine races, he had a best finish of 16th place. Stewart had more success in a one-time ride in the Truck Series with Mueller Brothers Racing, where he finished 10th.

Stewart was poised to improve his IRL standing in the 1996-97 season, but at times he struggled to finish. He failed to finish the first three races of a ten-race schedule, but recovered to come in second at Phoenix. At that year's Indy 500, Stewart's car was good enough to enable him to win his first IRL race, leading 64 laps. However, he trailed off near the end of the race and settled for 5th place. He finally got his first career win at Pikes Peak, where he led all but seven laps of a 200-lap race. He became the leading contender for the series championship after a bad slump knocked points leader Davey Hamilton out of first place. Despite an average end to his season, finishing seventh, fourteenth, and eleventh, and five DNFs, Stewart did just enough to beat Hamilton for the IRL title. He also raced in several midget events, finishing thirteenth and eleventh in the 1997 and 1998 USAC national points, and winning the Copper Classic both years. Between his time in USAC and the IRL, Stewart earned the nickname of "Smoke", first for slipping the right rear tire during dirt races and then for blowing his engine often during his 1997 championship run.

As he had done the previous year, Stewart raced a handful of Busch Series races in 1998. This time, he was racing for Joe Gibbs, NFL Hall of Fame head coach of the Washington Redskins, who was having major success with Bobby Labonte in the Winston Cup Series. When Stewart was able to finish races, he finished in the top-ten and had a third-place finish at Charlotte. Stewart so impressed Gibbs that he was signed to drive the majority of the Busch schedule in 1998 to go along with a full-time IRL schedule. The double duty did not affect his performance in either series. In the IRL, he won twice and finished third in the championship. His season was a disappointment as he finished last in the Indy 500 because of an engine failure.

On the Busch side, Stewart finished in the top five five times in 22 starts. He came close to winning his first Busch Series race at Rockingham, but was beaten on a last-lap pass by Matt Kenseth. Stewart finished a solid second place in second (of 31) starts, ahead of six drivers with more starts, and had an average finish that was comparable to some of the series' top-ten finishers. Gibbs had enough confidence in Stewart that he was moved up to a Cup ride for the 1999 season. With that move, Stewart ended his three-year career as a full-time IRL driver.

After transitioning to the Cup level, Stewart continued racing in the Busch Series on a part-time basis. On August 16, 2005, Stewart was fined $5,000 and placed on probation until December 31 for hitting Brian Vickers after the completion of the Busch Series Zippo 200 at Watkins Glen. He was driving a Busch car owned by Kevin Harvick Incorporated at the time.

In 2013, Stewart renewed his RCR deal to drive the No. 33 Oreo/Ritz Chevrolet. He won the opening Nationwide Series event at Daytona, overtaking Regan Smith on the last lap, but his win was overshadowed by worry because Smith had been turned and in the resulting crash, Kyle Larson had flown into the catch fence, completely slicing off the front part of his car and injuring 28 spectators in the grandstands (two critically). The next day in the Daytona 500, Stewart's day ended on lap 35 when he was caught up in an early crash with Kevin Harvick and Kasey Kahne; this would allow him to finish 41st. He rebounded slightly with an eighth-place finish at Phoenix and an eleventh-place finish in Las Vegas. At Bristol, Stewart blew his tire on lap 3 and cut a brake line; he came back out over 20 laps down, unable to contend for the victory.

In 2020, Stewart planned to make his return to the then-Xfinity Series for the Pennzoil 150 on the Indianapolis Motor Speedway's road course, but plans were called off due to the COVID-19 pandemic.

=== NASCAR Cup Series ===
After competing part-time during the 1996 NASCAR Busch Series season with the team, Stewart had planned to move up to the Winston Cup Series in 1997 driving for Ranier-Walsh Racing; however the deal fell through when Stewart decided he was not yet ready for the move.

==== Joe Gibbs Racing (1999–2008) ====
===== 1999 season =====
Stewart started his NASCAR Cup career in 1999 with a bang, as he qualified his No. 20 The Home Depot-sponsored Pontiac on the outside pole for the Daytona 500. He showed courage in one of the Gatorade Twin 125s when he was involved in a battle with Dale Earnhardt for the lead in the last laps. Though Earnhardt came out on top, Stewart had nonetheless impressed quite a few people with his performance. In the 500, Stewart ran near the front until problems with the car relegated him to a 28th-place finish.

Stewart spent most of his rookie season wowing people, as his car was often in the top five. He won a pair of pole positions at short tracks, and set a series record for wins by a rookie with three—Richmond, Phoenix, and Homestead—surpassing Davey Allison's record set in 1987 (Stewart's record would hold until 2025, when Shane van Gisbergen won five times). He finished his first Cup season with three wins, twelve top-fives, 21 top-tens, two poles, only one DNF, 1,226 laps led, a 10.26 average finish, and a fourth-place finish in the point standings, making it the highest points finish by a rookie in the modern era (which held until 2006 when his future teammate Denny Hamlin finished third) and only bested by James Hylton, who finished second as a first-timer in 1966. Not surprisingly, he ran away with the Winston Cup Rookie of the Year award.

Stewart also attempted to race 1,100 miles (1,800 km) on Memorial Day weekend, as he competed in both the Indy 500 during the day and the Coca-Cola 600 in Charlotte, N.C., at night. He finished in the top-ten at both races: ninth in the 1999 Indianapolis 500 and fourth at Charlotte. However, he only completed 1,090 miles (1,750 km) of the scheduled 1,100, as he finished four laps down at Indianapolis.

===== 2000 season =====
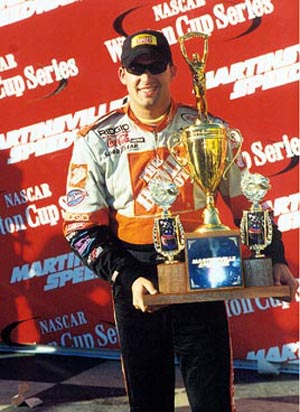
Stewart celebrates his 2000 NAPA Autocare 500 win

Stewart showed no signs of a sophomore slump in the 2000 NASCAR Winston Cup Series, winning a series-high six races (Martinsville, New Hampshire, Michigan, Homestead, and both Dover races). However, he fell to sixth place in the standings because of a handful of DNFs and an increase in the number of competitive drivers, among them his teammate Labonte, who won the Cup championship. Stewart also began to get some bad press for his on-track incidents. The best known of these came at Watkins Glen when he and Jeff Gordon tangled and crashed. Stewart made his displeasure toward Gordon known in an obscenity-laden tirade. Stewart won the Turkey Night Grand Prix midget car event at Irwindale, California, which he called, "one of his greatest wins ever."

===== 2001 season =====
Stewart got off to a scary start for the 2001 season: during the Daytona 500, he was involved in an 18-car crash on lap 173. The crash began on the back straightaway and also collected Bobby Labonte and his brother Terry, Rusty Wallace, Steve Park, Jason Leffler, Jerry Nadeau, Buckshot Jones, Andy Houston, Ward Burton, Mark Martin, Kenny Wallace, Jeff Gordon, Elliott Sadler, Dale Jarrett, Jeff Burton, John Andretti, and Robby Gordon. Stewart took the worst of it, as his car turned backward after being hit by Ward Burton, pushed over Robby Gordon, then flipped twice in midair, hooked Bobby Labonte's hood, and came to a stop in the infield. Stewart was transported to Halifax Medical Center after complaints of discomfort in his shoulder. Stewart's crash was greatly overshadowed by Dale Earnhardt's fatal crash on the last lap. Stewart recovered to win three more races at Richmond, Infineon, and Bristol and, as he had done before, he ran near the front most of the season. Statistically, he had a worse season than 2000, but he finished second to Gordon in the final points standings.

For the second time, Stewart ran the "Memorial Day Double", in spite of a seventeen-minute rain delay at Indianapolis. He finished sixth in the Indianapolis 500 and third in the Coca-Cola 600, running all 1,100 miles (1,800 km) of the two races.

The 2001 season was not without controversy. Jeff Gordon pulled a "bump and run" on Stewart to gain a better finishing position at Bristol and Stewart retaliated in a post-race incident by spinning Gordon out on pit road. Stewart was fined and placed on NASCAR probation. He got into much bigger trouble in the Pepsi 400 at Daytona, where he confronted a Winston Cup official after ignoring a black flag, which he had received for an illegal pass on Dave Blaney. In the same race, he had an incident with a Winston-Salem Journal reporter in which he kicked away a tape recorder. He confronted that same official during the Talladega race after he refused to wear a mandated head-and-neck restraint. Stewart was not allowed to practice until he wore one, and only managed to do so after his crew chief Greg Zipadelli intervened. Stewart's fines and periods of probation resulting from these incidents have earned him a reputation of having a hot temper, and he became known as NASCAR's "bad boy".

===== 2002 season: First Cup championship =====
Stewart started the 2002 season even more inauspiciously than last year's, as the Daytona 500 lasted just two laps for him due to a blown engine. He went on to win twice early in the season at Atlanta and Richmond, but he was only seventh in the points standings at the season's halfway point. At Darlington, Stewart was involved in a multi-car wreck in which Jimmy Spencer's car t-boned Stewart's car. While Stewart was sent to the hospital following the crash, he was able to start the next race at Bristol. Due to the injuries sustained at Darlington, he was relieved during the race by Todd Bodine. The second half of his season was plagued by an altercation with a photographer after the Brickyard 400. He was fined $50,000 by NASCAR and penalized with a 25-point deduction. However, despite the controversy, he went on to win the very next week at Watkins Glen. Strangely enough, this race also ended in controversy, when it was revealed that he had jumped the restart and, despite the infraction, officials upheld Stewart's win. This win proved to be a turning point in Stewart's season; he went on a hot streak following Watkins Glen, and despite not winning any more races that season his consistent top 10 finishes, combined with his rivals running into trouble, allowed him to claim the points lead at Talladega. At the end of the season, Stewart held off Mark Martin to win his first Winston Cup championship. This was Stewart's last season driving a Pontiac.

===== 2003 season =====
As the defending champion, Stewart managed to have a relatively incident-free 2003 season. Joe Gibbs Racing changed manufacturers, so he and Labonte were now driving Chevrolets instead of Pontiacs. Stewart had his worst Cup season at this point up until 2006, but it was still good enough for seventh in the points standings. He only won two races that season at Pocono and Charlotte but he led more laps than he did last year and was highly competitive in the final races of the season.

===== 2004 season =====
In January 2004, Stewart teamed with Andy Wallace and Dale Earnhardt Jr. in a Boss Motorsports Chevrolet to take fourth in the 24 Hours of Daytona sports car endurance race. The result does not show the trio's performance, however. They had dominated the race until the last two hours when the suspension cracked. With 15 minutes left in the race and Stewart driving, one of the rear wheels came off, finally ending their run. In addition to placing fourth overall, the trio placed third in the Daytona Prototype class.

Stewart started on a higher note in the 2004 season as he finished second in the Gatorade 125. In the Daytona 500, he and Dale Earnhardt Jr. both dominated the race, leading 156 laps overall (98 for Stewart). Stewart was in contention to win it, only to lose the lead to Earnhardt Jr. with twenty laps to go. That would be Stewart's best finish in the Daytona 500.

At Infineon, Stewart was involved in an altercation with rookie driver Brian Vickers. On lap 88 of 110, Stewart got spun out by Vickers as retaliation for an earlier collision in the race. Stewart replied by confronting Vickers after the race and throwing a punch through Vickers' window. Stewart was fined $50,000, stripped of 25 driver & owner points, and put on probation for the rest of 2004.

The season was highlighted with Stewart's first win coming at Chicagoland. This win was not without controversy as on a mid-race restart, he turned Kasey Kahne into the wall, which eventually led to an altercation between his and Kahne's pit crews. Stewart felt very sick during the race at Watkins Glen International and nearly withdrew from it due to food poisoning, stomach cramps, a headache, and a sinus infection. He ultimately relented and ran the race, dominating and holding off Canadian road ringer Ron Fellows for the win. He qualified fourth for the first-ever Chase for the NASCAR NEXTEL Cup. However, an incident at the first race of The Chase at Loudon ended his hopes of a second Cup championship. Stewart got collected in a multi-car crash, which started when Robby Gordon repaid Greg Biffle some retaliation, and Stewart t-boned Biffle. Stewart had to make repairs and lost three laps. He finished two laps down, causing him to lose his shot at his second championship. Gordon did not get off the hook however and was penalized with a $15,000 fine and a 50-point deduction for his actions.

After losing his bid for the championship title, Stewart finished sixth in the Nextel Cup point standings.

In November 2004, Stewart became the owner of one of the most legendary short tracks in America, Eldora Speedway. Located in New Weston, Ohio, Eldora is a half-mile dirt track known to many as "Auto Racing's Showcase Since 1954." Stewart began racing there in 1991 and continues racing in special events alongside other Sprint Cup drivers and dirt track legends.

===== 2005 season: Second championship =====
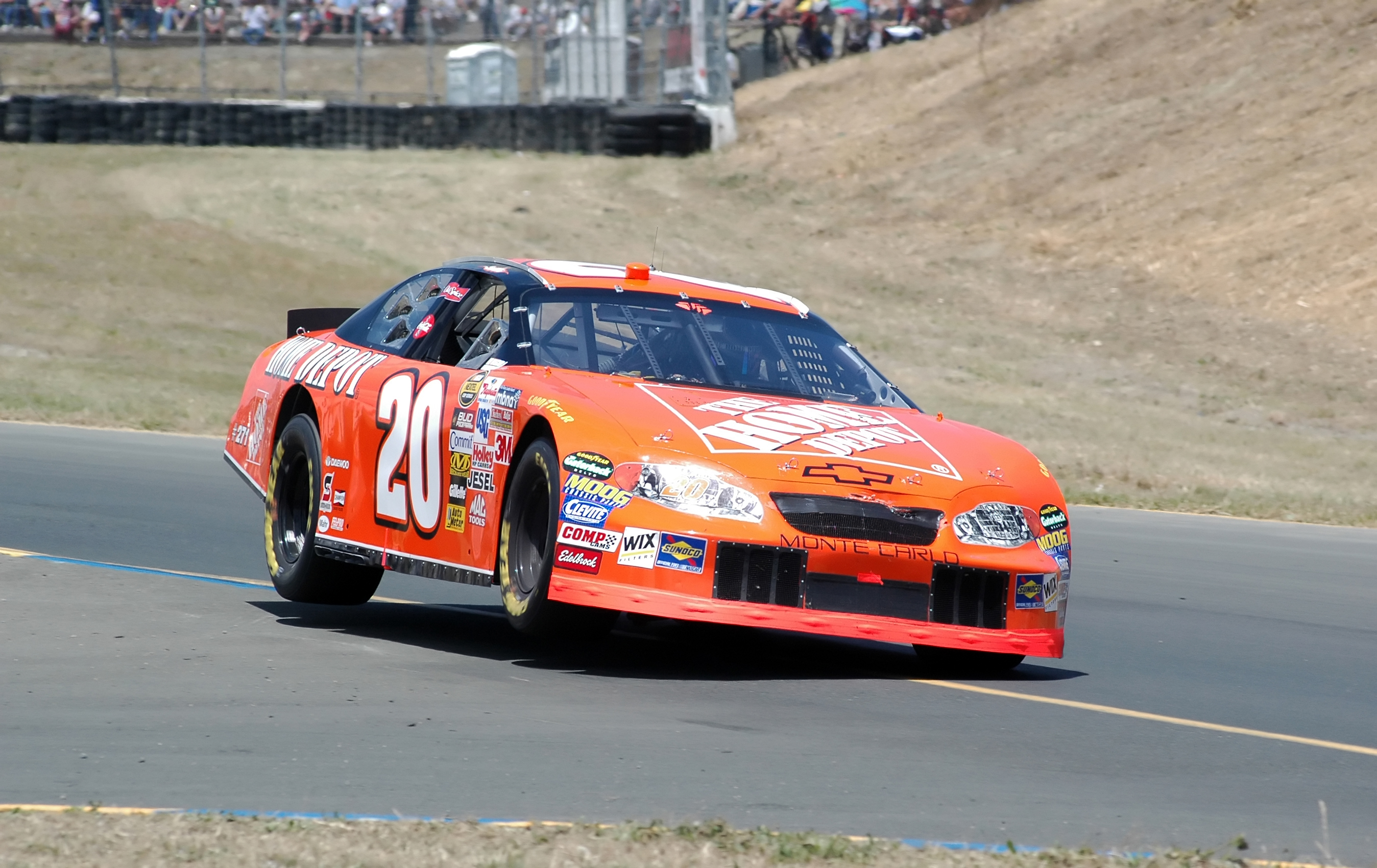
Stewart on two wheels before going on to win the 2005 Dodge/Save Mart 350, at Infineon Raceway

2005 was one of Stewart's most successful years in the Nextel Cup Series as he won his second Cup title. He won five races at Infineon, Daytona, New Hampshire, Watkins Glen (which gave him a sweep of the road course races for the year and a record three straight road course wins) and Indianapolis, his hometown track (in a race that Stewart said he would give up his championship to win, and took with it the No. 1 seed heading into NASCAR's Chase for the Nextel Cup ten-race playoff).

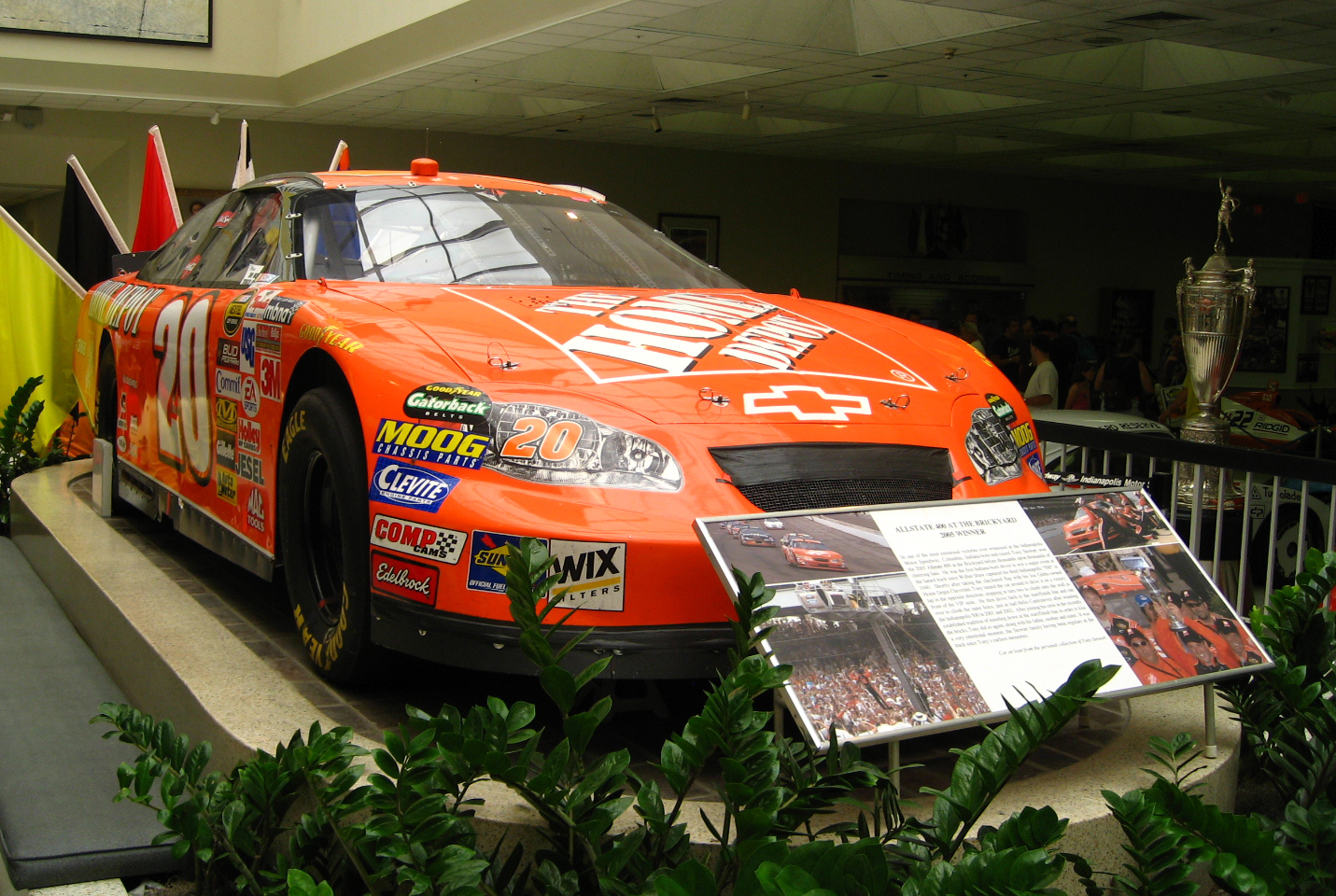
Stewart's 2005 Allstate 400 at the Brickyard winning car on display at the Indianapolis Motor Speedway museum

Following his win in the Pepsi 400, Stewart began climbing the fence separating the fans from the race track after each victory, borrowing IndyCar Series driver Hélio Castroneves' trademark move. After winning the 2009 All-Star race, Stewart was quoted as saying "I'm too damn fat to be climbing fences," and recently purchased $17,000 worth of exercise equipment to remedy the problem. It also led to sponsor The Home Depot cashing in on Stewart's success with some promotions reminiscent of Stewart's Eldora Speedway drivers. After his second full climb of the fence in Loudon, N.H., they ran a discount on ladders and fencing at the stores with a campaign named, "Hey Tony, we've got ladders", where anyone who presented the advertisement in national newspapers in their stores earned the discount. After his victory in Indianapolis, The Home Depot presented fans who presented the advertisement of his Allstate 400 win with a discount on purchasing bricks. He mentioned in a press release from his sponsor, "I plan to keep winning races and helping to drive down the cost of home improvement for The Home Depot customers."

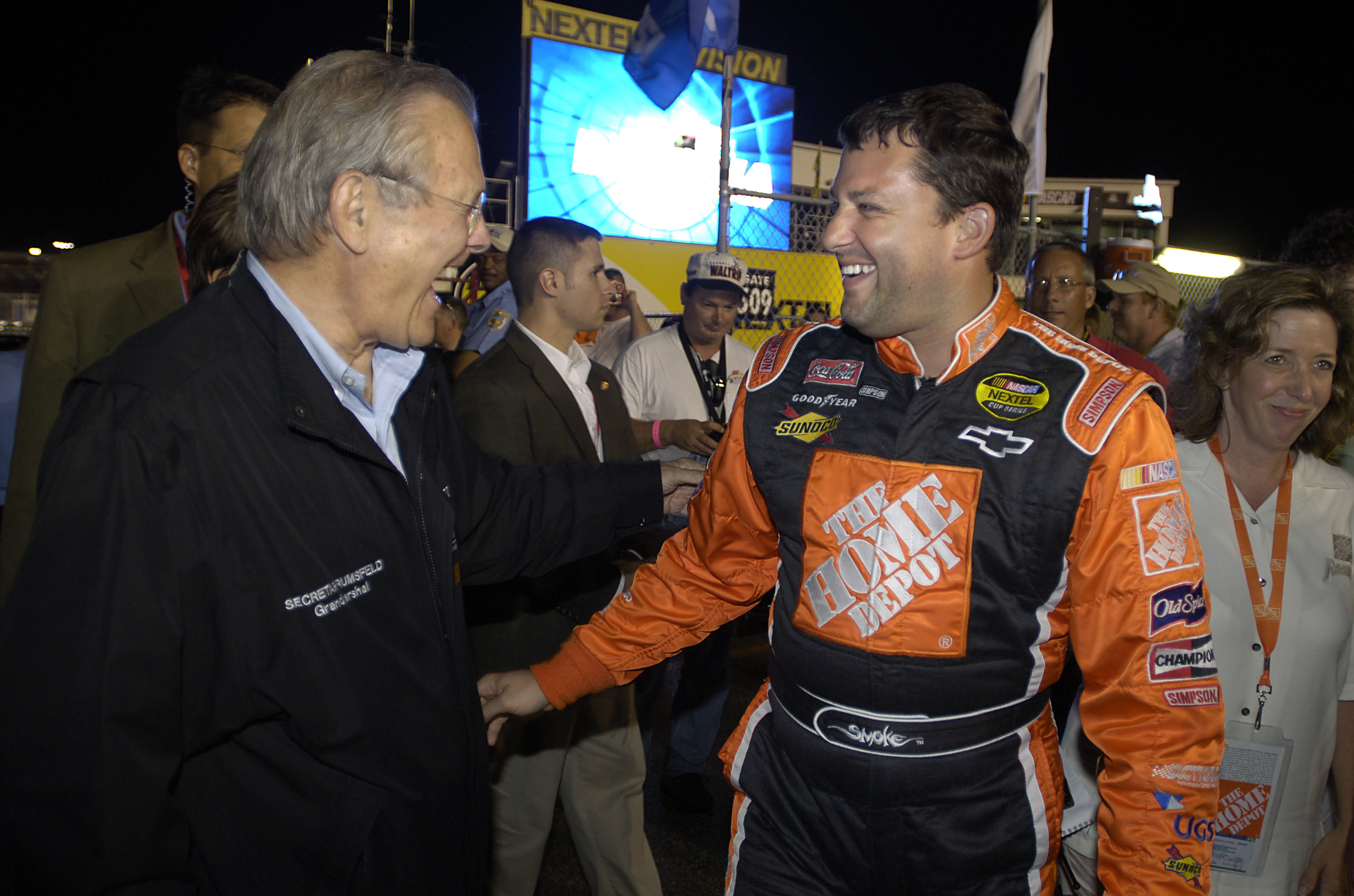
United States Secretary of Defense and grand marshal Donald Rumsfeld (left) and Stewart share a laugh before the 2005 Pepsi 400

On November 20, 2005, Stewart won his second Cup Championship, joining Jeff Gordon as the only active, full-time drivers at the time to have won multiple championships. Jimmie Johnson afterward did so from 2006 to 2010. In victory circle, Stewart had said that he loved winning his 2005 championship better than his 2002 one because his 2005 season was more well-behaved than 2002. At an age of 34, this made Stewart one of the youngest drivers to win multiple championships (with Johnson joining this category as he won his five straight titles while in his early 30s) and to date, he is still the only driver to have won championships under both the Chase and non-Chase formats. During the 2005 season, Stewart won a total of $13,578,168, including $6,173,633 for winning the championship, the largest season total in NASCAR history.

===== 2006 season =====
Stewart's 2006 season had up and down notes. He had competitive cars and scored early wins at Daytona and Martinsville. However, he also had strings of bad luck. He also suffered a shoulder injury due to two heavy crashes in both the Busch and Cup races at Charlotte during the Memorial Day Weekend races (Stewart's Busch car hit the Turn 4 wall so hard it even knocked the rear end off the car). During the Dover race, he was substituted by Ricky Rudd and, in later weeks, had to drive in pain.

Additionally, Stewart once again was involved in several on-track controversies.

Following a rough Bud Shootout on February 12, Stewart expressed concern to the media about the possibility of aggressive driving resulting in the serious injury or death of a driver. It came during a week in which the racing world remembered the fifth anniversary of Dale Earnhardt's death. Just a few days later, during the Daytona 500, Stewart was involved in several incidents with Jeff Gordon, Kyle Busch, and Matt Kenseth, whom he chased halfway across the track to run into the grass. "He has no room to complain," Stewart said of his brush with Kenseth. "He started it, and I finished it".

On May 20, during NASCAR's All Star Race, Stewart and Kenseth wrecked again. Each driver claimed it was the other one's fault with Stewart saying, "if (Kenseth) thinks it's my fault and I (caused the wreck) he's screwed up in his head." Following the wreck, several media outlets proclaimed the new Stewart-Kenseth rivalry as must-see TV. The so-called rivalry was short-lived as Kenseth and Stewart participated as friends in a joint promotional tour for DeWalt and The Home Depot; Kenseth also appeared in September at Stewart's Eldora Speedway in the NEXTEL PRELUDE with NASCAR drivers, as well as the ARCA Truck Series event there.

On July 1, Stewart dominated the Pepsi 400 but after a pit stop seemed like an unlikely contender for the win. However, Stewart amazed the audience when in the final 10 laps he drove from 14th up to second place, and passed Boris Said to take the lead and win. After the race, Stewart said he no longer wanted to climb the catch-fencing at Daytona because of the fans crowding him but he later changed his mind on that thought.

On July 23, Stewart once again was at the center of a media storm. On lap 31 of the Pennsylvania 500, Stewart was accidentally squeezed against the wall by Clint Bowyer. Stewart responded by waving his hand in anger, then purposely hitting Bowyer's car. This contact sent Bowyer spinning down the front stretch where he collided with Carl Edwards. Stewart was promptly held one lap by NASCAR for rough driving. He did however pass leader Ryan Newman to get back on the lead lap and eventually rallied to finish 7th and get back in the top 10 in the point standings. After initially refusing to take responsibility for the incident he apologized the next day.

Stewart missed the cut to qualify for the 2006 Chase for the Nextel Cup by sixteen points, becoming the first defending champion to miss the Chase the following year. He finished poorly at Richmond after wrecking his primary car in practice, and was displaced in the top ten by Kasey Kahne. As a result, he finished the 2006 season 11th in points, his worst thus far in his career, as he had completed each of his seven previous seasons in the top ten in points. Commenting on not being in the 2006 Chase, he says: "It lets us have the ability to take chances and try things ... that we've been wanting to try but just haven't had the luxury to do it. If we were in the Chase we wouldn't have that ability". Stewart won three races in the 2006 Chase (Kansas, Atlanta, and Texas).

The season was not unkind to Stewart, however. He was a participant in the thirtieth season of IROC and won two of the four races (Texas, and the Daytona road course) on his way to capturing the series championship. He won a million dollars for the effort but made an offer to return his prize money if IROC would hold one of its events at his Eldora Speedway. This offer was not entertained as IROC folded in 2007. In addition, Stewart's three wins in the Chase races gave him five total for the season, tying him with Jimmie Johnson and Kevin Harvick for second-most in Nextel Cup behind Kasey Kahne's six.

===== 2007 season =====
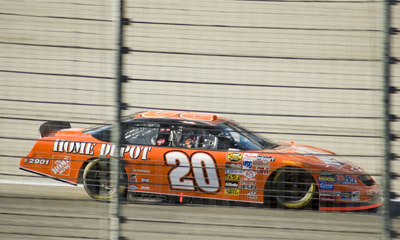
Stewart races by at Texas Motor Speedway in 2007

Stewart started the 2007 season by winning his second Chili Bowl Nationals midget car feature. Stewart started off the Daytona Speedweeks with a win in the 2007 Budweiser Shootout. It was his third win in the race. He also won his qualifying race for the Daytona 500.

On lap 152 of the Daytona 500, the rear of Stewart's car slid up the track and, when he tried to cut down the track, he smacked the front of Kurt Busch's car knocking both of them out of the race. Stewart and the Busch brothers (Kurt and Kyle) were the three leaders for the majority of the race.

On March 22, 2007, it was announced that Stewart would be on the cover of the official NASCAR video game NASCAR 08, published by Electronic Arts. This would be the third time this honor was given to Stewart (2001 & 2003).

In his first Car of Tomorrow race with the Impala SS, Stewart was dominant at Bristol, leading 257 of 504 laps (green-white-checker finish), before he experienced a fuel pump problem. In his third Car of Tomorrow race at Phoenix, Stewart lead a race high 132 laps, but a late race caution moved Stewart to second, where he finished behind Jeff Gordon. In the following week, Stewart implied the cautions were "bogus" and that NASCAR is "rigged like professional wrestling".

On June 4, 2007, Stewart and Kurt Busch had another altercation on pit road in the Autism Speaks 400 at Dover. Kurt Busch passed Stewart on the inside and then slid up, which caused contact, sending him into the wall, knocking out Busch, but with Stewart staying in the race. Initially, it was thought that Stewart intentionally crashed Busch due to hard feelings over their accident at Daytona that year. Under the caution, Stewart was on pit road and his crew was surveying the massive damage he received from the crash; when an enraged Busch pulled alongside and gave Stewart a profane gesture to express his feelings over the incident. One of Stewart's pit-crew members jumped out of the way of Busch's car to avoid being hit, while Busch was parked for the contact made on pit road. Busch would later be fined $100k for his actions by NASCAR, while Stewart got off with a pre-race warning from NASCAR before the following race at Pocono.

At the All-Star Race at Charlotte, Stewart finished fifth behind Kevin Harvick, Jimmie Johnson, Mark Martin, and Jeff Burton. At the Coca-Cola 600, Stewart finished sixth, after having to come into the pit for fuel. On July 15, 2007, Stewart led a race-high 108 laps and recorded his thirtieth career NEXTEL Cup win at the USG Sheetrock 400 at Joliet.

On July 29, 2007, after leading a race-high 65 of 160 laps, Stewart won the Brickyard 400 again, just 45 minutes from where he grew up. This was his second win in the race at his favorite track. It was not without controversy though; Stewart made the winning pass by accidentally bending the rear of Kevin Harvick's car, causing Harvick to fall back quickly to seventh place by the time the checkers waved. Stewart apologized for the contact in victory lane and during the victory lane interview, Stewart was penalized 25 points and fined $25,000 for violating NASCAR's policy on the use of obscene language during interviews during the race. This was similar to 2004 when Dale Earnhardt Jr. used an obscenity in a post-race interview at Talladega and was knocked out of the points lead as a result of the penalty.

On August 12, 2007, Stewart won the Centurion Boats at the Glen at Watkins Glen after Jeff Gordon spun his car around after wheel hopping in turn 1 with two laps to go. Carl Edwards briefly challenged Stewart on the final lap, but spun out into a pullover site sealing Stewart's win.

===== 2008 season: Final season at JGR =====
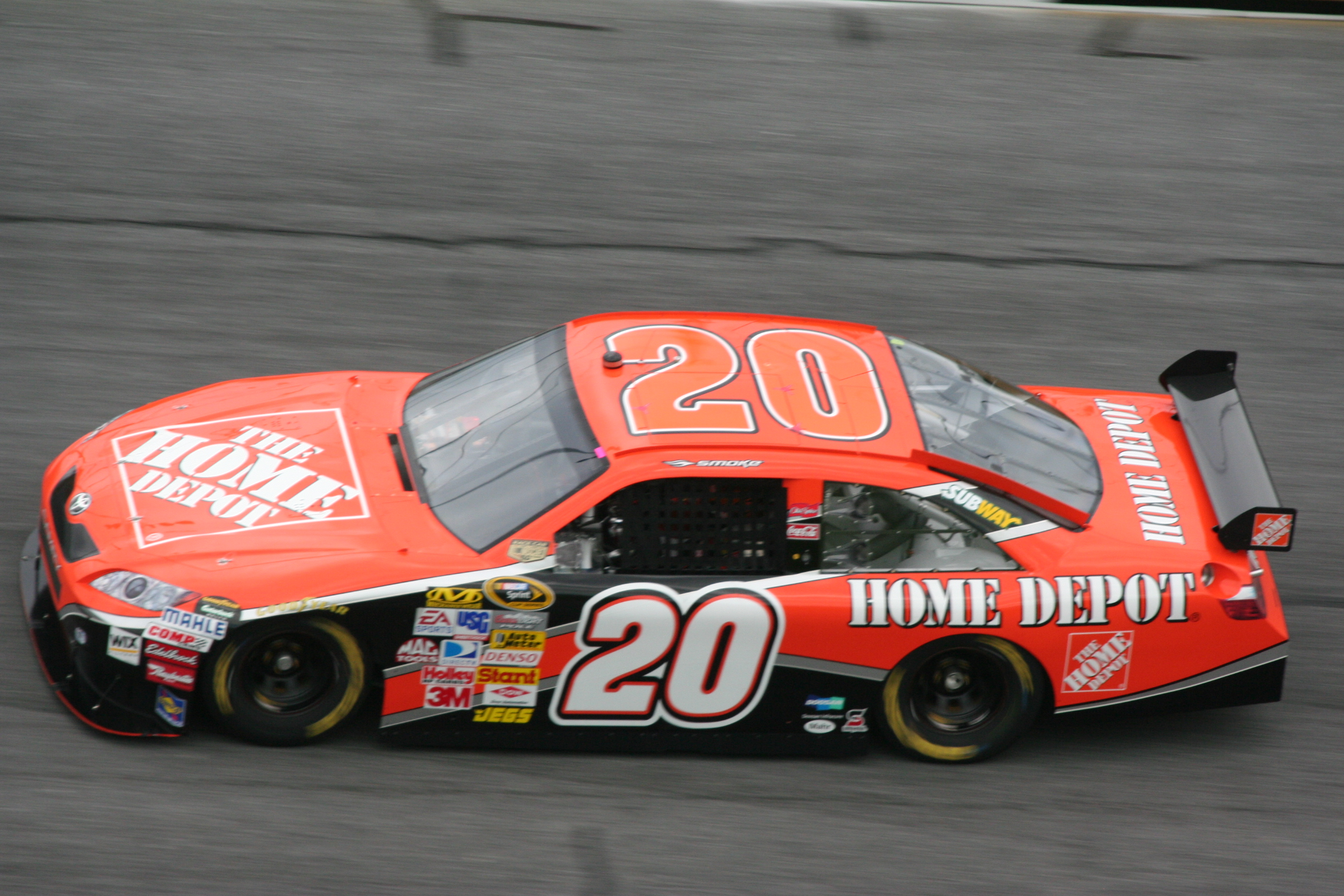
Stewart's Toyota Camry

As Joe Gibbs Racing officially switched its manufacturer partnership from Chevrolet to Toyota, Stewart began the 2008 season with a sixth place start in the Daytona 500. During this race, he was only able to come up with a third-place finish after being passed by Ryan Newman and Kurt Busch on the last lap. The finish of this race was somewhat like a repeat of the previous year's Daytona 500, in which Stewart's close friend Kevin Harvick passed Mark Martin to win it.

On lap 109 of the UAW-Dodge 400, Stewart's car cut a tire and slammed hard into the turn 3 retaining wall. Although he climbed out under his own power, Stewart was transported by ambulance to the infield care center. Stewart had complained about a sore foot from a wreck that occurred the day before the Nationwide Series race at Las Vegas. Stewart was later announced that he was okay and ripped on Goodyear for not bringing any quality tires.

With three laps to go in the 2008 Coca-Cola 600, Stewart cut a tire and saved it from contact with the wall. However, Stewart had to give up the lead to future race winner Kasey Kahne to make pit stops.

In the Best Buy 400, Stewart was involved in another crash with Elliott Sadler, in which Sadler got turned by David Gilliland and car collected Stewart and 11 other cars; those included Dale Earnhardt Jr. and Denny Hamlin. Stewart, who was frustrated over his misfortune, sarcastically said, "I take 100 percent responsibility – it's my fault for being anywhere close to Elliott. If I'm within half a lap of him, I expect that to happen. It's my fault – I'm the one that hit him. When I hit him, it caused all the guys behind us to wreck, so it's my fault."

In July 2008, Stewart made a deal with car owner Gene Haas into a co-owning partnership in a racing organization called Stewart–Haas Racing for 2009 when he left Joe Gibbs Racing. Ryan Newman came to the meeting to make his deal with SHR officially signed earlier in the year.

On July 5, 2008, during the Coke Zero 400 at Daytona, Stewart started feeling ill and turned his car over to former Joe Gibbs Racing teammate J. J. Yeley, who took the car to a twentieth-place finish after getting involved in two wrecks in the last five laps. Stewart earned his first and only win of the season in the AMP Energy 500 at Talladega on October 5, 2008, making it his last win with Joe Gibbs Racing. With Subway / Home Depot being the sponsor, this meant that Home Depot was at least the co-primary sponsor for every victory Stewart recorded at JGR. On the final lap, Stewart was passed by Regan Smith (the rookie of Dale Earnhardt, Inc.) who beat Stewart to the line. NASCAR declared that Smith had made an illegal pass under the yellow line, and awarded the victory to Stewart. It was his only win with Toyota in the Cup series.

After the Ford 400, Stewart attended a tearful farewell meeting with Joe Gibbs Racing and gave his car and team to rookie Joey Logano, who replaced him for JGR.

==== Stewart Haas Racing (2009–2016) ====
===== 2009 season =====
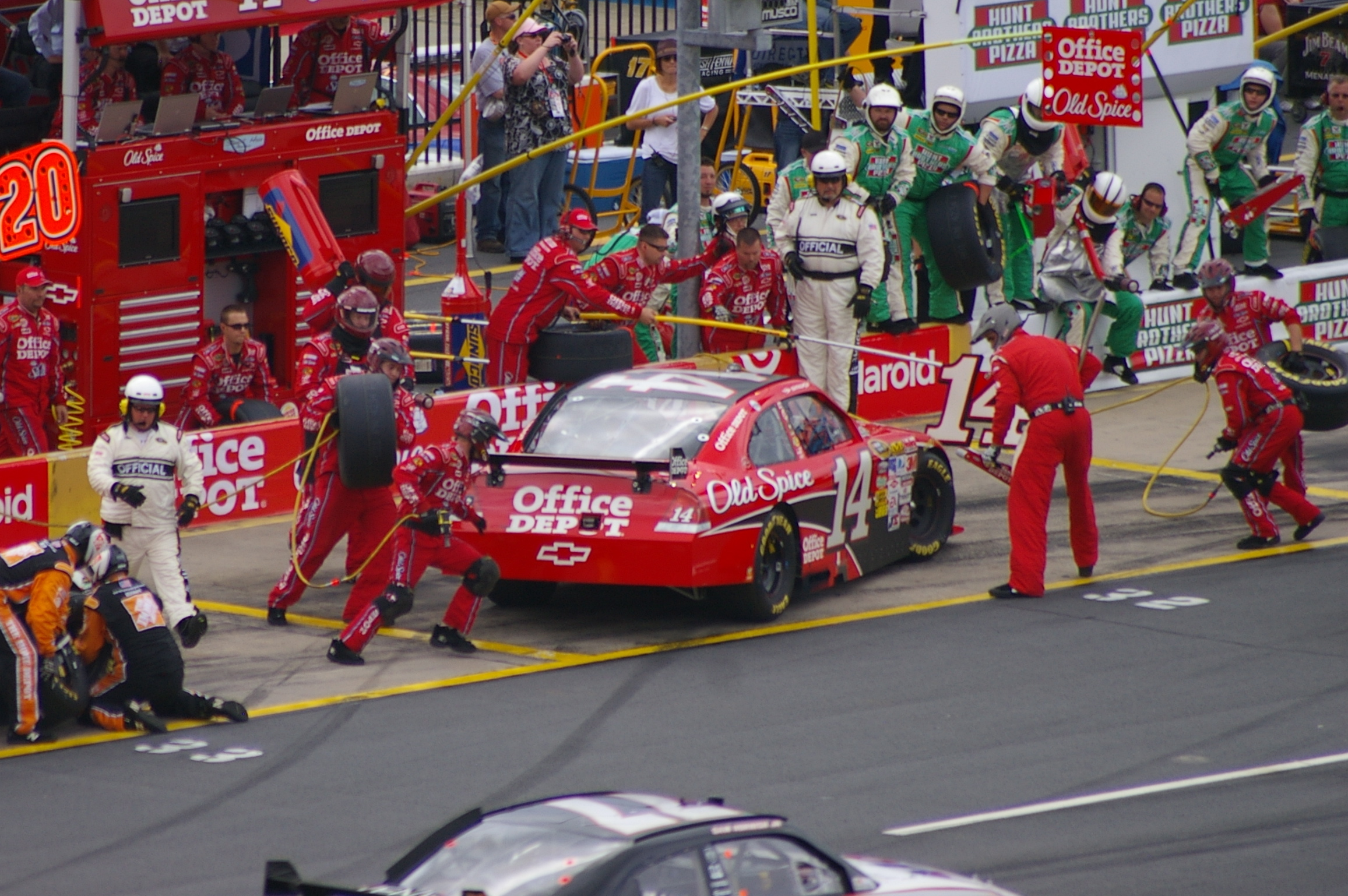
Stewart pits his No.14 Impala in the 2009 Coca-Cola 600 at Charlotte Motor Speedway.

On July 8, 2008, it was reported that Stewart was released from the last year of his contract with Joe Gibbs Racing, primarily because JGR had switched from Chevrolet to Toyota, and Stewart was vocal about his loyalty to Chevrolet (which sponsors his USAC Midget, Sprint Car, and Silver Crown teams). Stewart announced he would move to Haas CNC Racing to drive a Haas Chevrolet, with sponsorships from Office Depot (relocating from the No. 99 Roush Fenway team) and Old Spice. Stewart took half ownership of the team which was renamed Stewart–Haas Racing, and Stewart became the highest-paid NASCAR driver. Stewart's car at Haas has the number 14 as an homage to his hero A. J. Foyt. To date, he is the third-most successful driver for Joe Gibbs Racing with 33 wins and two championships (2002 and 2005), behind Denny Hamlin with 64 wins, and Kyle Busch, who has 57 wins and two championships (2015 and 2019).

On August 15, 2008, fellow Indiana native Ryan Newman signed a multi-year contract to drive the second car for Stewart–Haas Racing, originally to be designated No. 4 but changed to his USAC No. 39, with sponsorship from the U.S. Army (relocating from Earnhardt Ganassi Racing).

As the most recent series champion not among the top-35 in owners' points, Stewart was first in line for past champions' provisionals for the first five races of 2009. He completed those races without needing to use the provisional, ending up well inside the top-ten in points. Stewart won his first race as a driver/owner in the non-championship NASCAR Sprint All-Star Race XXV, winning more than $1,000,000, his first win in the event in ten attempts. He followed that victory with his first points race win as a driver/owner at Pocono in the Pocono 500 on June 7, 2009, the first owner-driver in the Cup series to win a race since Ricky Rudd in 1998. Stewart also won the Coke Zero 400 at Daytona after a controversial finish when he wrecked Kyle Busch to do so. In a similar fashion to the spring race at Talladega that year, Busch passed Stewart on the final lap but in the final turn Stewart went underneath Busch who tried to block but with 100 feet left from the checkers the two made contact resulting in Stewart sending Busch into the wall, and Busch wrecked across the line in the final lead position while Kasey Kahne submarined under his car.

Stewart's season overall was his best showing since his rookie year, with another win coming at Watkins Glen International. Stewart qualified for the 2009 Chase for the Sprint Cup as he finished the first 26 races as the points leader. He fell to second in points following reseeding when Mark Martin, who won more races than Stewart, moved ahead of him. On October 5, 2009, Stewart won the Price Chopper 400 and moved to fourth in the standings, ending the season in sixth place.

===== 2010 season =====
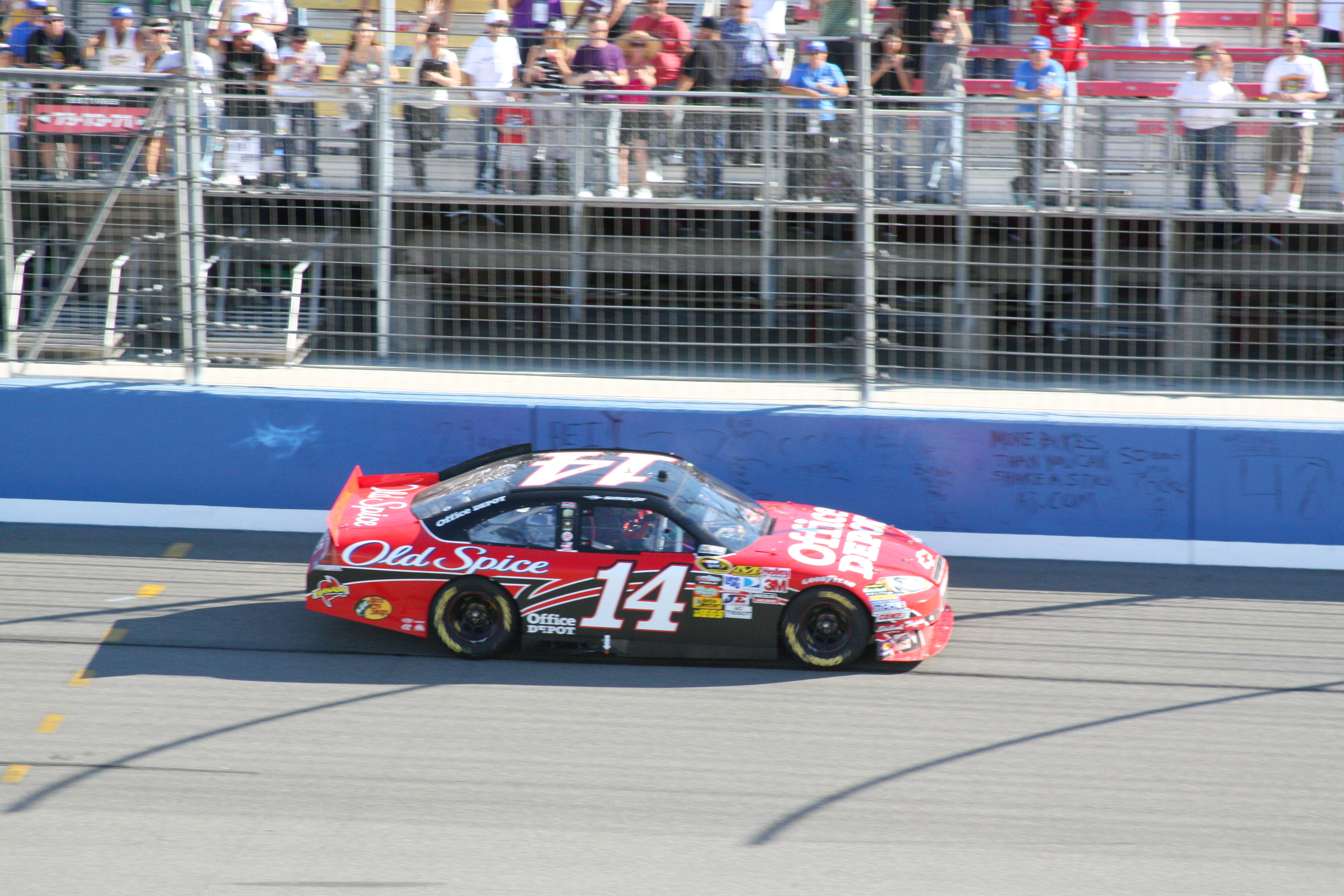
Stewart after winning the 2010 Pepsi Max 400

On April 16, 2010, Stewart won his first Sprint Cup pole position in five years at Texas Motor Speedway, with a lap speed of 191.327 mph. The race was the 400th in the Sprint Cup for Stewart, and was his first starting from the pole since October 2005 at Martinsville Speedway.

On May 9, 2010, it was reported that Stewart would lose Old Spice as a sponsor after eleven years with them.

Stewart won two races in 2010: the Emory Healthcare 500 at Atlanta Motor Speedway on September 5, 2010, and the Pepsi Max 400 at Auto Club Speedway on October 10, 2010.

In September at Loudon, Stewart led part of the final stages trying to hold off Clint Bowyer for RCR who dominated the race; when the white flag waved the fans saw that Stewart was out of gas; Bowyer passed him and won both the white flag and the checkers. Stewart finished 24th and waved to Bowyer to congratulate him as he slowly crossed the line to finish. After the race Stewart said when interviewed "My feelings are not happy that's for sure but we had a strong race; I thank Office Depot, Coca-Cola, and my sponsors... congratulations to Clint Bowyer and the helping hands, they deserved that one. I think I ran myself out of fuel; my team apologized and said "sorry for running you out of fuel", I think I ran myself out of fuel."

On October 12, 2010, Mobil 1 announced a sponsorship deal with Stewart–Haas Racing to sponsor Stewart's car, starting in 2011. It would be the primary sponsor for eleven races, while Office Depot would be the primary sponsor for the rest of the season. Mobil 1 would also sponsor Stewart in the Budweiser Shootout and the All-Star Race.

===== 2011 season: Third championship =====
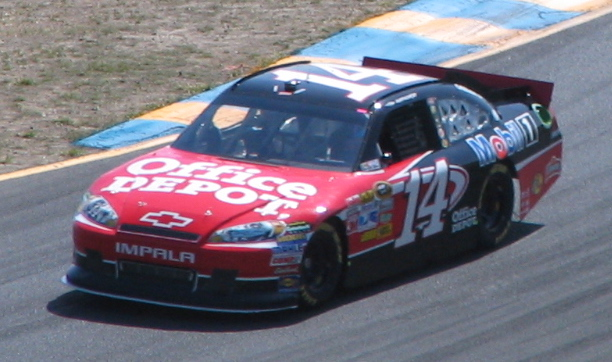
Stewart during the 2011 Toyota/Save Mart 350

In 2011, Stewart returned in the No. 14 Office Depot-sponsored Chevrolet. Following a crash intentionally caused by Stewart on Brian Vickers at Infineon Raceway in June 2011, Vickers intentionally wrecked Stewart as payback. In an interview when asked about the crashes, Stewart said, "It was payback, but, you know, I dumped him first, and I dumped him because he was blocking..." Stewart and his teammate, Newman, started the Lenox Industrial Tools 301 first and second, and they finished it where they started as Newman won that race. By the Heluva Good! Sour Cream Dips 400, Stewart said in a post-race interview that his team was running so poorly that he was "wasting one of those top twelve spots." Entering the Chase for the NASCAR Sprint Cup portion of the schedule winless, Stewart won the opening race of the Chase at the Chicagoland Speedway and jumped up seven spots in the points, securing second place and extending his streak of consecutive years with a win to thirteen. Stewart made it two for two in the Chase after Clint Bowyer ran out of fuel in the closing laps of the Sylvania 300 at the New Hampshire Motor Speedway. Stewart took the win and the points lead after New Hampshire. At Talladega, Stewart struggled to lead a lap, and eventually did so; with assistance from Ryan Newman, Paul Menard, and Joey Logano, he led an additional 29 laps and captured the two-point bonus for leading the most laps. On October 30, 2011, at Martinsville Speedway, Stewart won the Tums Fast Relief 500, leading three times for 14 laps and moving into championship contention in second place in the points standings.

The next week, Stewart led 173 laps en route to winning the AAA Texas 500 at Texas Motor Speedway, bringing him to within three points of championship points leader Carl Edwards with two races to go in the 2011 season. On November 20, 2011, Stewart won the NASCAR Sprint Cup Series championship by winning the final race at Homestead–Miami Speedway while Edwards finished second. Stewart and Edwards were tied on total points, but Stewart claimed the tiebreaker by having five race wins, all during the Chase, to Edwards's one win. In the process, Stewart became the first driver/owner to win the championship since Alan Kulwicki in 1992.

===== 2012 season =====
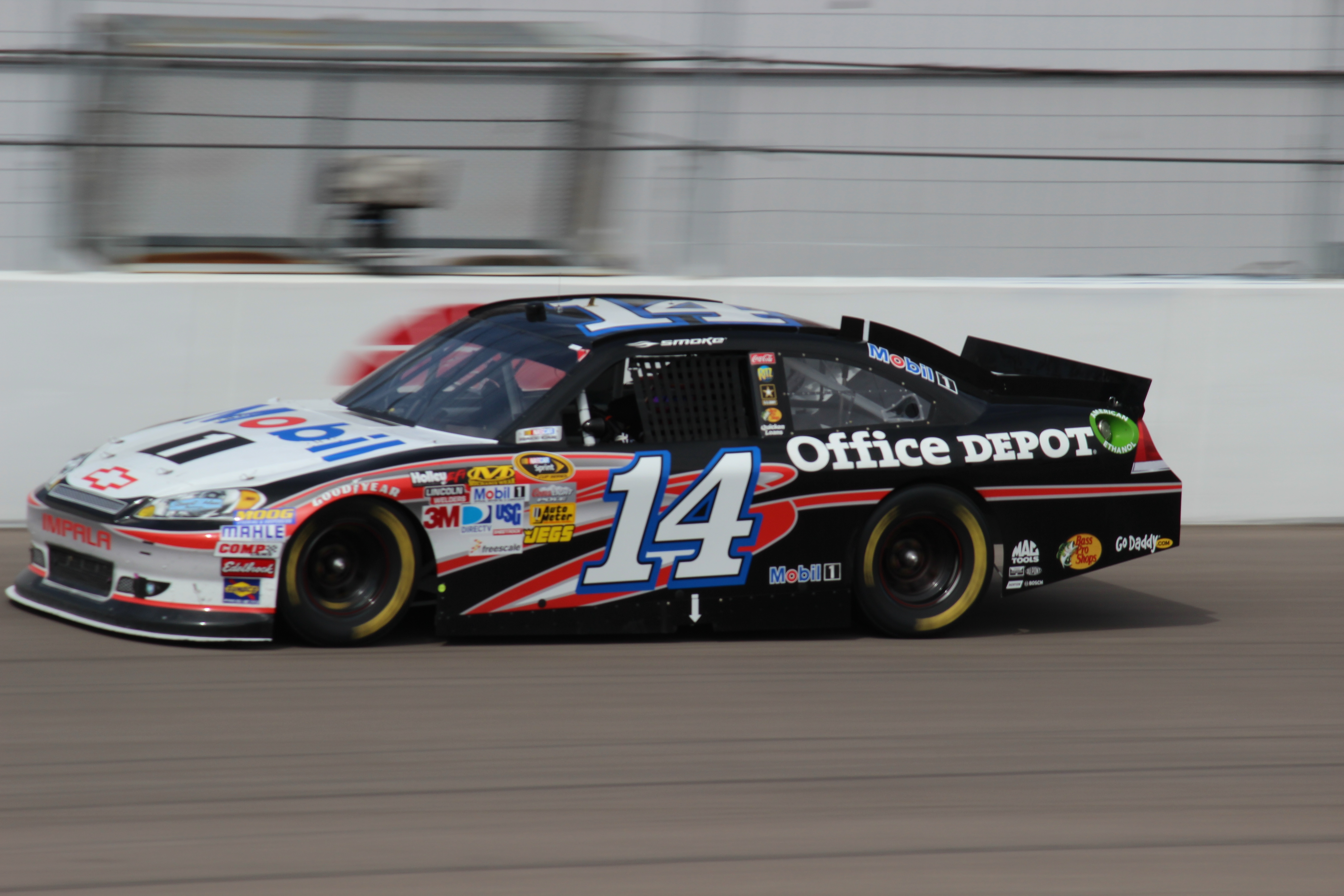
Stewart during the 2012 Kobalt Tools 400

Before the season, Stewart welcomed new drivers, retired IndyCar driver Danica Patrick and driver David Reutimann to drive partly for Stewart–Haas Racing as part of a partnership with Tommy Baldwin Racing who provided parts of the cars.

On February 11, 2012, Stewart led the final stages of the Budweiser Shootout by passing Marcos Ambrose on the final lap but was passed in a desperate charge to the finish line by Kyle Busch who beat him to the line in what was said the closest finish in Budweiser Shootout history (It would have been 2011 with Kurt Busch and Denny Hamlin but Hamlin was black-flagged for being below the yellow line). Stewart won the first duel of the Gatorade Duels at Daytona when his new driver Danica Patrick hit the wall hard on the backstretch on the final lap, which brought out the caution. Stewart started third in the Daytona 500 and ran well throughout the race, but was caught up in a late-race crash on lap 196 after getting turned by Ricky Stenhouse Jr. On March 11, Stewart won the Kobalt Tools 400 at Las Vegas Motor Speedway, beating Jimmie Johnson. It was his 45th career win and brought his streak of consecutive Cup seasons with a win to 14.

On March 25, 2012, Stewart won the rain-shortened Auto Club 400 at Auto Club Speedway. On June 3, 2012, Stewart was caught in a thirteen-car crash on the back leg at Dover and finished the race in 25th place.

Stewart led eighteen laps at the 2012 Quicken Loans 400 and finished second behind Dale Earnhardt Jr.. Stewart, however, caused controversy and got ripped by the fans and media for saying in a media conference that Earnhardt winning "Is not a national holiday," and taunting the Earnhardt nation for celebrating the fourth anniversary of Earnhardt's last win in 2008.

At Sonoma, Stewart moved quickly from the top 20 to third in the final laps of the Toyota Save Mart 350 and ended up second to Clint Bowyer by passing Kurt Busch on the final turn on the final lap. On July 7, Stewart was able to hold off Matt Kenseth to win his fourth Coke Zero 400 as a wreck ensued behind him. The win was a surprise one, as Stewart had been forced to start 42nd due to his car failing pre-qualifying inspection.

In August at Bristol in the 2012 Irwin Tools Night Race, when battling for the lead on lap 333, Stewart and Matt Kenseth tangled and brought out a caution. This was soon after Ryan Newman was wrecked by Juan Pablo Montoya in an accident which collected Jeff Burton. A furious Stewart climbed out of his wrecked car and angrily tossed his helmet at Kenseth's car, who exited out of the pit road, and then gestured applause at the fans. This was followed shortly thereafter by his student driver Danica Patrick wagging a finger at Regan Smith after he turned her into the inside wall many laps later.

In September, at Atlanta, team spokesman Mike Arning announced that Office Depot would not be Stewart's sponsor in 2013.

On October 2, 2012, Bass Pro Shops announced they would be a co-primary sponsor for Stewart in a selected number of races for the 2013 season.

At the Talladega race in the fall, Stewart was leading on the final lap but underestimated the speed of a closing Michael Waltrip. On turn 4, Waltrip got a run, and tapped Stewart from behind, causing Stewart to spin and Waltrip to spin into the pack, causing a Big One that involved 23 cars, the largest crash of the season to date. Stewart flipped over, hitting the roofs of several other cars, including Kasey Kahne, Paul Menard, and Clint Bowyer, before landing upright. On November 9, it was announced that Kevin Harvick would be joining Stewart's team starting in 2014.

Stewart would finish ninth in points, with two top-fives and four top tens in the Chase, for a final season total of three wins, twelve top-fives, and sixteen top-ten finishes overall.

===== 2013 season =====
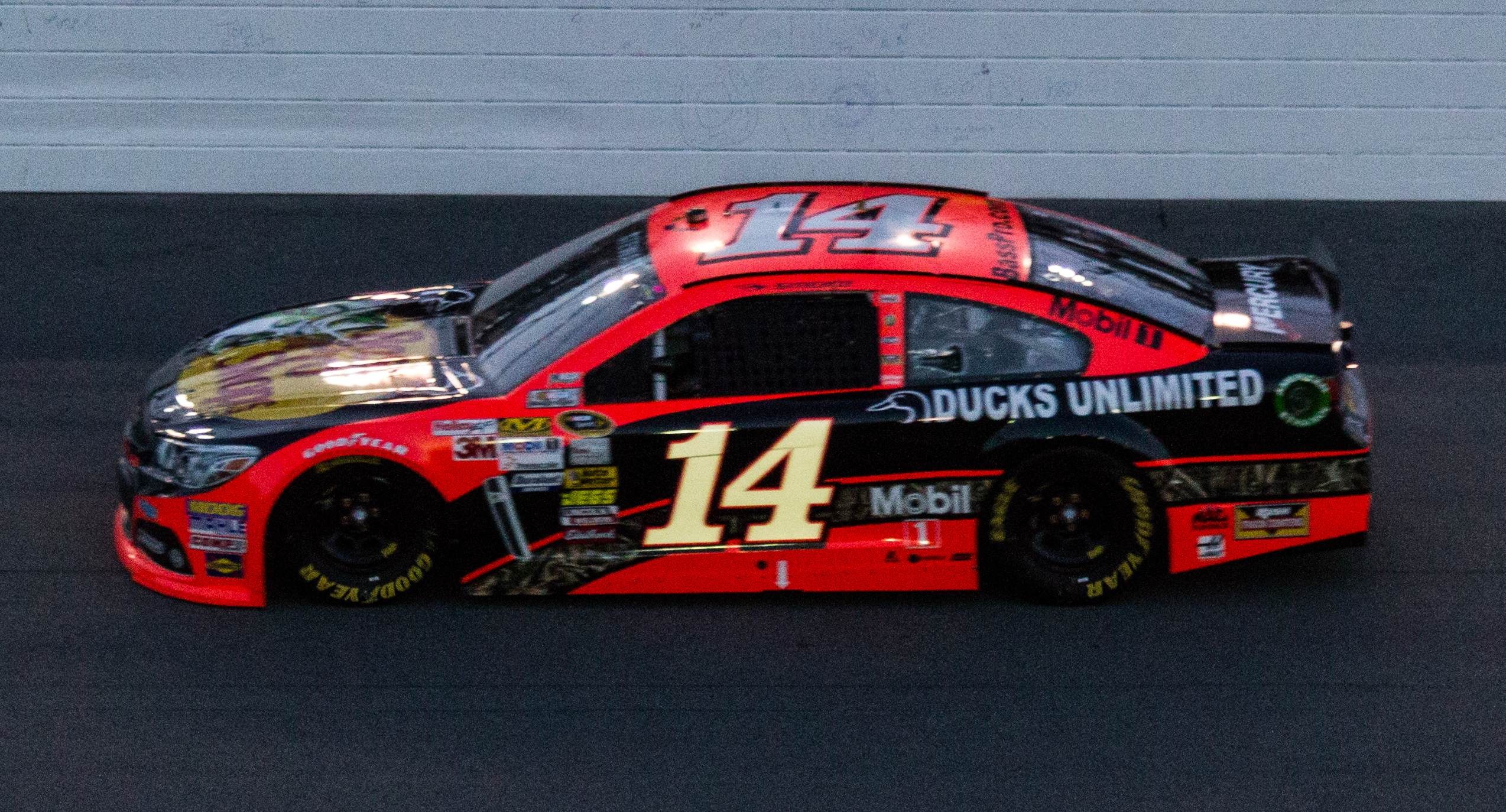
Stewart during the 2013 Coke Zero 400

In early 2013, reports said that Stewart was offered a chance by Roger Penske to race in the 2013 Indianapolis 500 in a Penske car. Stewart declined and said he was not ready to try the big race yet, due to his focus on stock cars.

In the Daytona 500, Stewart's day ended on lap 35, when he was caught up in an early crash with Kevin Harvick and Kasey Kahne; this would allow him to finish 41st. He rebounded slightly with an eighth-place finish at Phoenix and an eleventh-place finish in Las Vegas. At Bristol, Stewart blew his tire on lap three and cut a brake line; he came back out over twenty laps down, unable to contend for the victory.

At Fontana, Stewart ran well for most of the day, leading laps and running on an alternate pit cycle, and nearly contended for the win. However, due to a late-race incident when Joey Logano blocked him on the last restart, Stewart ended up in 22nd place at the bottom of the lead lap. After the race, Stewart, angered, confronted Logano, who had just wrecked his car after battling with Denny Hamlin hard into the last turn, on pit road in a scuffle involving both teams' crews.

At Richmond, Stewart looked to be in contention for the win as he was fifth on a green-white-checkered finish, but in a fashion similar to his confrontation with Logano at California, after a poor restart, he lost a few positions. On the last lap, Kurt Busch tapped his bumper, moving Stewart out of the second groove up to the top of the race track, subsequently losing about five positions coming home eighteenth while Busch took a ninth-place finish. Stewart showed his displeasure with Busch after the race had finished, rubbing with him on the race track, leading to a shoving match between the two when slowing down after the race ended. Down near the haulers, the two turned their attention to race winner Harvick; they had a verbal confrontation, again, Stewart showing Busch his displeasure with his aggressive move. It was the first time since 2008 that the two got together in a feud.

At Talladega, Stewart was caught up in a fifteen-car wreck on lap 43 and ended up finishing 27th, five laps down. His teammates, Danica Patrick and Ryan Newman, were caught up in a later wreck on lap 182, in which Newman's car got crushed when Kurt Busch flipped over and landed on top of it.

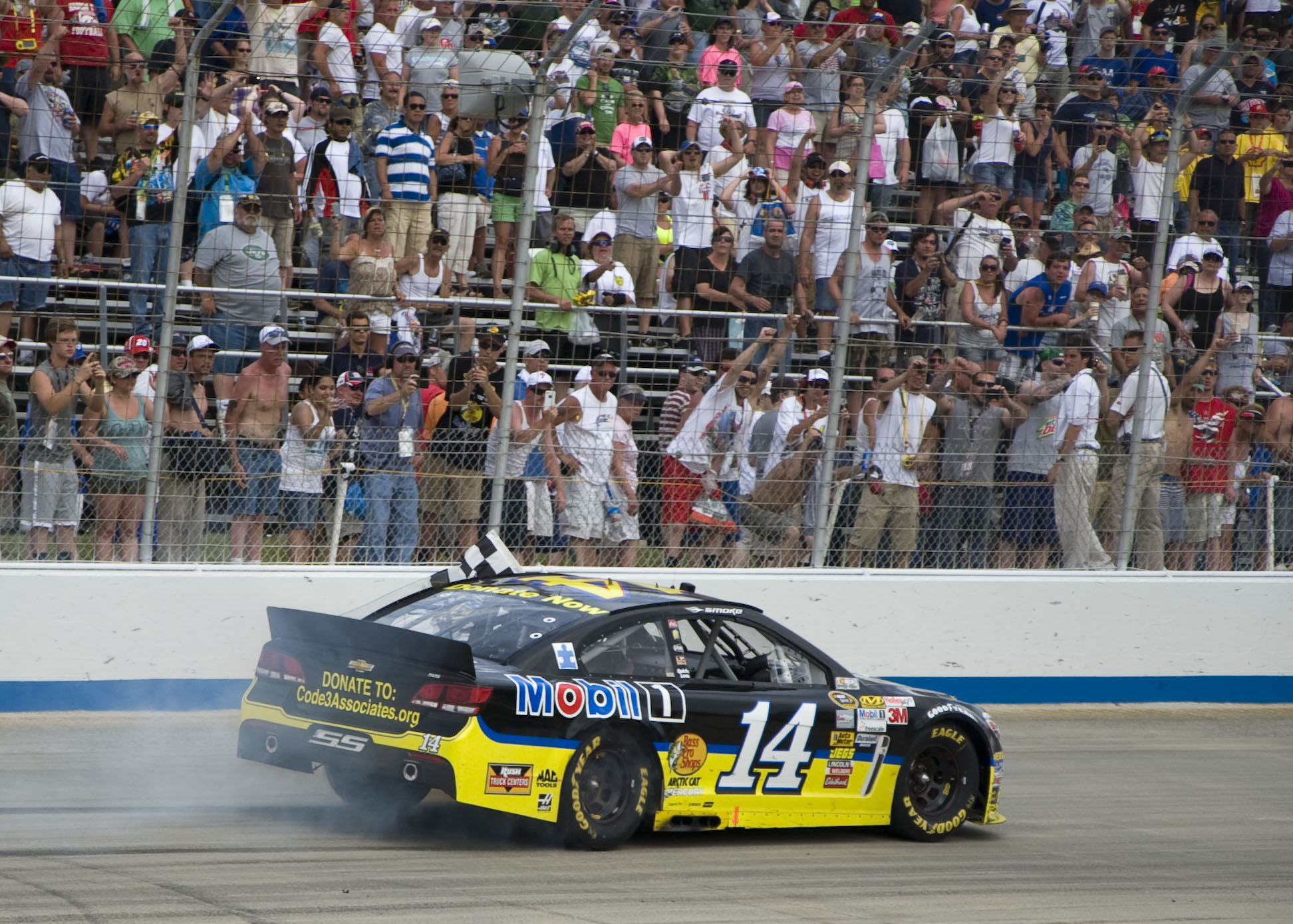
Stewart after winning the 2013 FedEx 400

Stewart's 2013 season start was considered his worst start to a Sprint Cup season yet. As of Richmond, he had only one top-ten finish, which was at Phoenix. The rest of his finishing positions had been in the upper tens or lower twenties. After Richmond, Stewart was 22nd in the points standings with 207 points, 136 behind Jimmie Johnson. However, he showed signs of a rebound in the following weeks, scoring a solid seventh-place finish at the Coca-Cola 600 while avoiding several wrecks.

The following week at Dover, Stewart went a lap down early but got back on the lead lap with a beneficiary. In the last twenty laps, after Johnson was penalized for jumping the last restart, Stewart overtook Juan Pablo Montoya and held him off over the last three laps to score his sole Sprint Cup win of 2013. The win propelled him up four positions to 16th, into a Wildcard spot. This also gave Stewart a streak of fifteen straight seasons with at least one race win. He followed this up with a fourth-place finish at Pocono and a fifth place at Michigan. His momentum was killed briefly by a 28th-place run at Sonoma and a twentieth-place finish at Kentucky, but Stewart then rebounded to a second-place finish at the Coke Zero 400.

At New Hampshire, Stewart led 84 laps and was overtaken by Brian Vickers with fourteen laps to go. A caution that led to a green-white-checkered finish ultimately ruined Stewart's chances of winning, as he ran out of fuel after the restart while Vickers took the win. Stewart then rebounded with a 4th-place run at Indianapolis and a ninth-place run at Pocono.

====== Leg injury ======
The day after the Pocono race, on August 5, 2013, while leading a sprint car race at Southern Iowa Speedway in Oskaloosa, Iowa, Stewart was involved in a multi-car crash when a lapped car spun in front of him and Stewart drove straight into him while it was sideways causing him to flip multiple times. The hit was hard enough that Stewart broke both the tibia and fibula bones in his lower right leg. He was taken by ambulance to a local hospital where surgery was performed on his broken leg. A second surgery was performed on August 8, 2013, in which a metal rod was inserted into the tibia. The injuries were bad enough that Stewart's streak of 521 consecutive Sprint Cup starts, dating back to the 1999 Daytona 500, ended. A replacement driver for the August 11 race at Watkins Glen International was not immediately named, though it was eventually announced that road veteran Max Papis would fill in for Watkins Glen. Stewart was eventually released from the hospital on August 11.

Prior to August 11, 2013, speculation arose regarding who would replace Stewart on the oval courses, with speculation that the replacement would either be Regan Smith, who drove two races in Dale Earnhardt Jr.'s car after Earnhardt was sidelined with a concussion in 2012, or Austin Dillon. It was announced after Watkins Glen that Dillon would drive Stewart's car for Michigan. On August 19, 2013, Stewart was ruled out for the remainder of the season. Mark Martin was released from his contract with Michael Waltrip Racing and signed on to drive Stewart's car for the remaining thirteen races of the year, with the exception of Talladega, where Dillon drove the car. Brian Vickers and Elliott Sadler would drive the No. 55 for races Martin was originally intended to drive for MWR in.

===== 2014 season =====
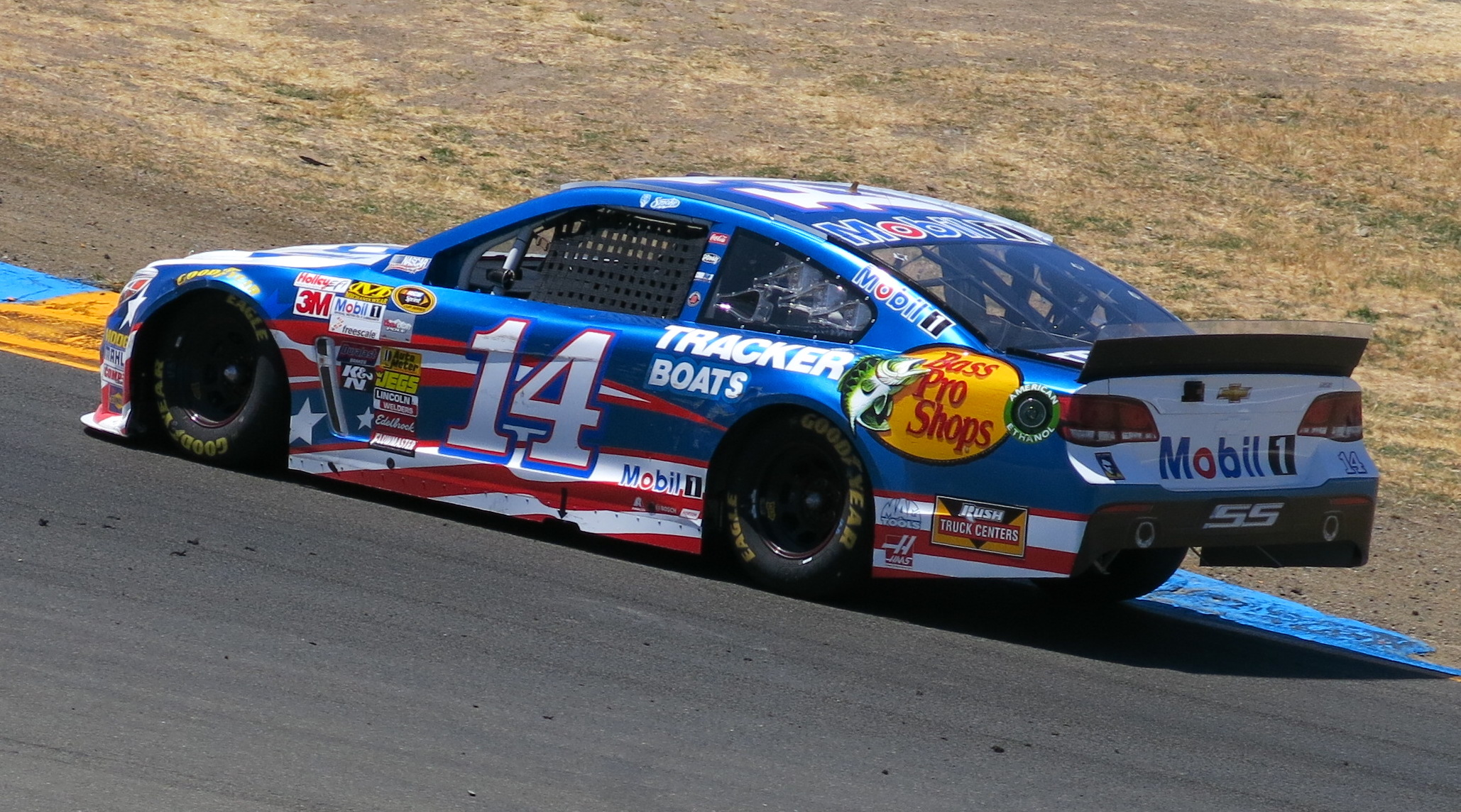
Stewart during the 2014 Toyota/Save Mart 350

Before the season, it was announced that Stewart had been medically cleared to race. Stewart mentioned during Pre-Season Thunder that his leg would be about 65% healed going into Daytona. Stewart ran the Sprint Unlimited and was collected in a nine-car crash, though he was able to exit his car under his own power and without any pain. Stewart entered the Daytona 500 in his backup car, starting from the rear of the field. After the six-hour and 22-minute rain delay, the race resumed, but just shy of halfway, Stewart's fuel pickup began to fail. His crew repaired the problem in the garage and allowed Stewart to return to the track, finishing the race 27 laps down.

The next week at Phoenix, Stewart ran in the top ten most of the day. A late string of cautions set up multiple restarts, and Stewart opted to come down to pit road to be serviced each time the caution was thrown, subsequently losing track position. On the last and final restart, Stewart had four fresh tires and was starting nineteenth. He gained three positions, from nineteenth to sixteenth, where he finished. Stewart gained 12 spots in the standings, from 32nd to twentieth.

At Las Vegas, Stewart struggled with the handling of his car and finished 33rd, four laps down.

At Bristol, Stewart missed the second round of knockout qualifying and started 37th. However, with a fast racecar, he was able to make his way up the field and finish fourth, his first top-five finish since the previous year's Brickyard 400. Stewart was the highest-finishing Chevrolet in the race.

Stewart qualified tenth at Auto Club. After a spin early in the race, Stewart was running 12th at the last caution, coming off of pit road second and lining up fourth for the green-white-checkered finish behind Paul Menard, his driver Kurt Busch, and Landon Cassill. On the final restart, Stewart and Busch battled for the win, only to be passed up by Kyle Busch and Kyle Larson. Stewart finished third, not being passed by Matt Kenseth, his fifth top-five in a row.

Stewart had a strong run at Pocono. He qualified in the top five and ran in there nearly the whole race, before a speeding penalty on pit road left him with a thirteenth-place finish. When Stewart was asked about what happened, he said, "It was a 100% driver error. Last week, I cried over a sixth-place finish, and I just threw this one away. 100% driver error. My fault."

At Michigan, Stewart ran in the top five. Late in the race, Stewart tangled with rookie Kyle Larson when Larson threw a block, leaving Stewart with an 11th-place finish. Stewart replied by bumping Larson under yellow and side-swiping him. The next week, Stewart said, "He'll learn not to block me. One way or another, he'll learn as I did at his age."

After the Kevin Ward Jr. tragedy in mid-August, Stewart skipped Watkins Glen, Michigan, and Bristol. He was subbed by Regan Smith and Jeff Burton for those races. Despite having missed three races and thus losing too many points to recover lost points in the final two races, NASCAR granted him a waiver allowing him to still be eligible for the Chase if he won in the final two 'regular season' events, which he failed to do, causing him to miss the Chase for the third time in his career.

At the end of the October Charlotte race, Stewart was hit on pit road by Brad Keselowski, who was trying to run into Matt Kenseth, but missed. Stewart retaliated by reversing into him, smashing Keselowski's front in. Stewart was fined $25,000 and placed on probation until November 12, 2014, along with Keselowski who was fined $50,000.

At Martinsville, Stewart almost won. On the final restart, he pulled out in front of Dale Earnhardt Jr. but, having older tires, got overtaken by Earnhardt with four laps to go. Stewart finished 4th but stated that after what he went through from August to then, finishing 4th felt like a win to him.

Stewart finished the year with a last-place finish at Homestead-Miami, ending his fifteen-year winning streak. As a driver, 2014 was Stewart's worst year statistically. The season ended on a positive note for Stewart, as he won the Owner's Championship with Kevin Harvick. In an interview the day before the race, Stewart blamed his subpar year on the new rules package, saying it did not complement his driving style. He also dismissed countless claims that his poor showing had anything to do with his 2013 leg injury.

====== Return to sprint cars ======
On February 15, 2014, Stewart returned to sprint car racing in his No. 14 sprint car, the very car that broke his leg in 2013. When asked why he returned, Stewart said he loved racing sprint cars too much to leave. Stewart silenced his critics by dominating and winning a sprint car race at Tri-City Motor Speedway in a huge comeback story. After the race, Stewart said:

It was a confidence boost for me. When you haven't won and haven't been necessarily a contender, you start questioning what's in the equation that you're missing. Is it something that you're doing or not doing as a driver? To be able to win and have two good runs like that in a car that I haven't been in for almost a full year now, that was a huge confidence boost.

===== 2015 season =====
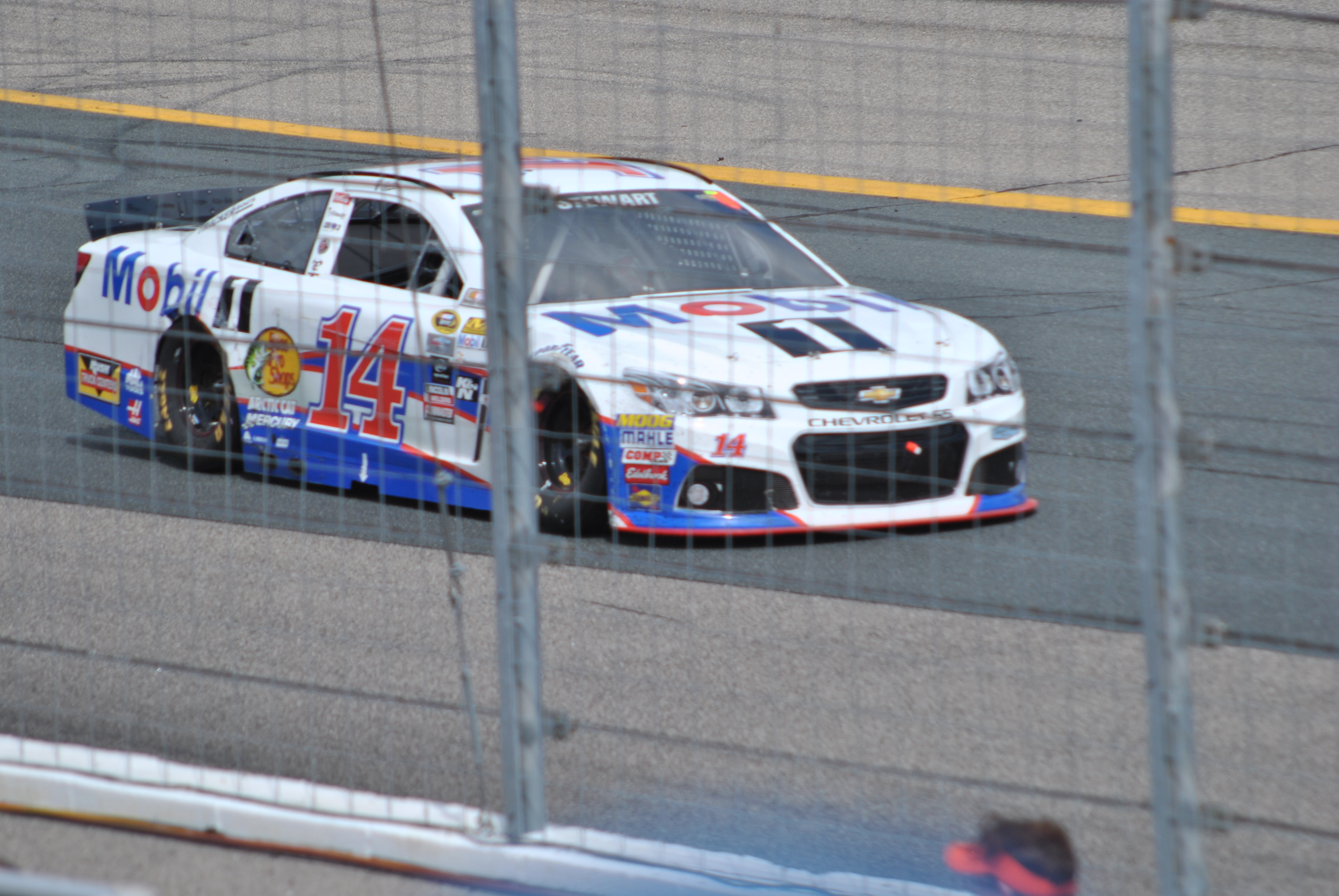
Stewart racing at New Hampshire Motor Speedway in 2015

Stewart did not do as well in the 2015 season as hoped, as he failed to score a win for the second year in a row and missed the Chase. He even failed to finish higher than 6th-place for the first time in his career, only scoring three top-ten finishes the entire season. Despite these results, Stewart refused to put the blame on his crew chief, in spite of criticism from fans, saying that "I still really like working with Chad Johnston, I don't feel like he's what's holding us back... I'm holding him and the team back versus vice versa". He showed signs of a comeback after qualifying runs of 4th at Indianapolis, fifth at Pocono, third at Watkins Glen, and fifth at Michigan.

In his last start of the season-opener Daytona 500, Stewart was involved in an accident on lap 41 with Matt Kenseth that collected Ryan Blaney and Michael Waltrip. Stewart pitted with significant front-right damage, and later took responsibility for the accident, saying that "when it got three-wide that particular lap, it got away from me". He ended up retiring on lap 72.

At the next race, the QuikTrip 500, Stewart did not set a time in qualifying due to a technical irregularity surrounding the amount of camber the car was running. Stewart had a relatively clean first part of the race, however in the second half of the race with 21 laps to go, was involved in a large accident alongside Clint Bowyer, Greg Biffle, Ricky Stenhouse Jr., Regan Smith and Joe Nemechek, resulting in a red flag. Tony would finish 30th.

After qualifying twelfth for the Kobalt 400, Stewart's fortunes did not improve as he finished 33rd, due to a pass-through penalty issued for a tire rolling out from his pit.

At the 2015 CampingWorld.com 500, Stewart qualified seventeenth. On lap 288, he crashed, grinding alongside the front-stretch barrier, resulting in a caution. Stewart's teammate Harvick would eventually win.

At the next race, the Auto Club 400, Stewart had a clean race until 36 laps till the end. He was racing Aric Almirola hard, and Martin Truex Jr. cut in front of Tony, creating a hole in Stewart's bodywork which required him to pit for repairs. Following the incident, Stewart confronted Truex post-race, however Stewart still felt he had reason to be happy bar the incident, saying "We are getting to where we were sniffing the edge of the top ten anyway all day," and that "this [race] is a big gain for us".

In August, Stewart lent his private plane to the family of IndyCar driver Justin Wilson so they could fly out to Long Pond, Pennsylvania after Wilson was severely injured during a late-race crash; Wilson died several hours later.

On September 27, 2015, Bob Pockrass reported that Stewart announced plans to retire from racing after the 2016 season. Stewart formally announced on September 30, 2015, confirming this and announcing that Clint Bowyer would replace him in the No. 14 in 2017.

===== 2016: Final season =====
On January 31, 2016, Stewart injured his back while riding a dune buggy outside of San Diego with fellow driver Greg Biffle. Four days later, Stewart–Haas Racing announced he had suffered a burst fracture in his lumbar vertebra, which would prevent him from competing in the Daytona 500. Stewart was replaced by Brian Vickers and Ty Dillon. Stewart missed the first eight races of the season. On April 24, 2016, Stewart returned to racing in the Toyota Owners 400 at Richmond, where he finished nineteenth. Before the Richmond race, NASCAR granted Stewart a waiver from the rule saying that a driver must attempt every race to be eligible for the Chase. If Stewart won a race and finished in the top 30 in the standings by the autumn Richmond race, he would qualify for the 2016 Chase for the Sprint Cup.

For the running of the GEICO 500 at Talladega, Stewart would struggle at the beginning of the race but he would switch with Ty Dillon after the first caution, and Dillon would drive the rest of the race; the doctor advised Stewart not to drive the whole race to avoid further injury. The No. 14 car would get the free pass after the first caution. Dillon would finish sixth, but Stewart would get the credit since he started the race and would get his first top 10 of the year. He finished twelfth at Kansas the following week. At Michigan for the running of the FireKeepers Casino 400, Stewart would have his best race of the year so far. He would qualify a strong third and run great all race long and would finish seventh.

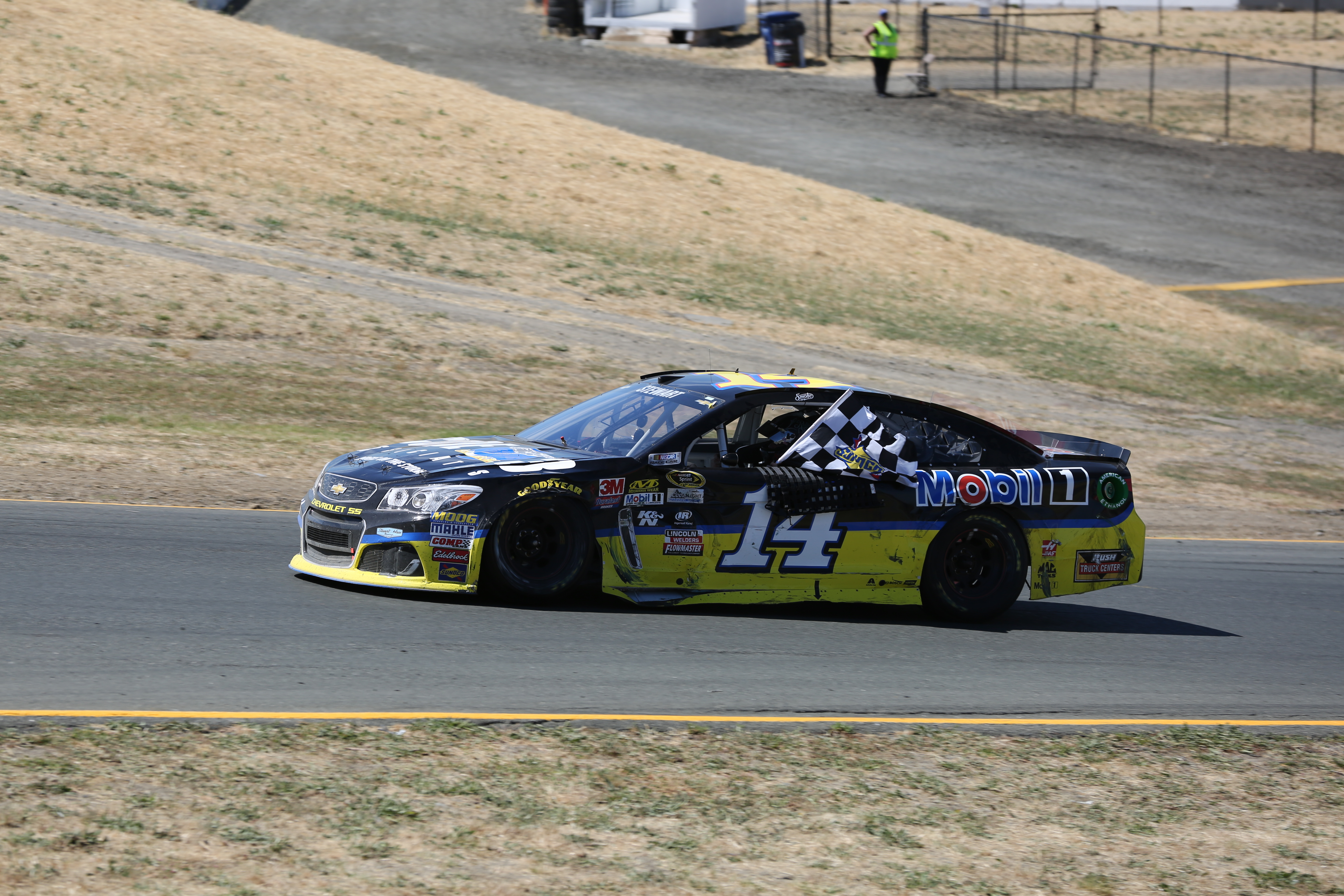
Stewart after winning the 2016 Toyota/Save Mart 350

The very next week at Sonoma, Stewart took advantage of a late caution and was able to lead the last twenty laps, winning for the first time in three years after making a last-lap pass on Denny Hamlin, who wheel-hopped in the final turn and hit the wall after Stewart slipped into the inside. The win was very popular amongst the garages, and the win vaulted Stewart from 34th to 31st in the standings, just nine points out of the top 30. Then the next race at Daytona, Stewart finished 26th due to a late wreck, but moved up to thirtieth in the points and became part of the Chase for the first time since 2012. He did much better at Kentucky, finishing a solid fifth and further propelling him to twentieth in owner's points. The next week at New Hampshire he would continue his streak of strong races and get a second-place finish, followed by two fifth-place finishes at Pocono and Watkins Glen.

At Richmond, Stewart was involved in a controversy with 28 laps to go in the race. Stewart, while racing former teammate Ryan Newman for tenth place, wrecked Newman in turn 3, causing a five-car pileup and ending Newman's chase chances. In an interview minutes after the crash, Newman was outspoken about his displeasure against Stewart and said "I guess he thought he was in a sprint car again and didn't know how to control his anger. It's disappointing that you have somebody who should be retired the way he drives. It's just ridiculous." Stewart's bid for a fourth title ended after poor finishes caused him to be eliminated from the first round of the Chase. After having his final top-ten at the 2016 Bank of America 500, Tony Stewart wrapped up his eighteen-year career in Cup competition with a 22nd-place finish at the 2016 Ford EcoBoost 400 where he was two laps down.

Before the 23rd running of the Brickyard 400, Stewart was inducted into the USAC Hall of Fame in recognition of his sterling United States Auto Club (USAC) career. He was the 1994 USAC National Midget champion; in 1995, Stewart became the first driver ever to claim all three of United States Auto Club National championships in a single season and is one of only six USAC "Triple Crown Champions." To date, Stewart Racing has also won seven USAC Silver Crown Series titles.

==== 2026: Return to NASCAR ====
In 2026, Kaulig Racing announced that Stewart would be driving the No. 25 Ram 1500 in the Truck Series at Daytona and at Talladega.

=== Rolex 24 at Daytona ===
Stewart has raced in a few sports car races, including the Rolex 24 at Daytona.

- 2002: Competed in the Rolex 24 on 2/2-2/3 for the Crawford factory team with co-drivers Jan Lammers and Johnny Mowlem.
- 2004: Competed for the second time in the Rolex 24 on 1/31-2/1 for Howard-Boss Motorsports with co-drivers Dale Earnhardt Jr., and Andy Wallace. The team led 355 of 526 laps and had a commanding five-lap advantage before mechanical problems less than 20 minutes short of the finish ended their shot at victory and placed them a disappointing fourth.
- 2005: Competed for the third time in the Rolex 24 on 2/5-2/6 for Howard-Boss Motorsports with co-drivers Jan Lammars and Andy Wallace. The team was leading with less than two hours remaining when a broken gearbox dropped them off the lead lap. The crew was able to make repairs, allowing the trio to rejoin the race, where they finished third. It was Stewart's first podium finish in the Rolex 24 Hours at Daytona.
- 2006: Competed for the fourth time in the Rolex 24 on 1/28-1/29 for Howard-Boss Motorsports with co-drivers Butch Leitzinger and Andy Wallace. The team finished 30th after suffering mechanical problems throughout the event.
- 2007: Competed for the fifth time in the Rolex 24 on 1/27-1/28 for Howard-Boss Motorsports with co-drivers Butch Leitzinger and Andy Wallace. The team finished 48th after mechanical trouble hampered the trio throughout the event.

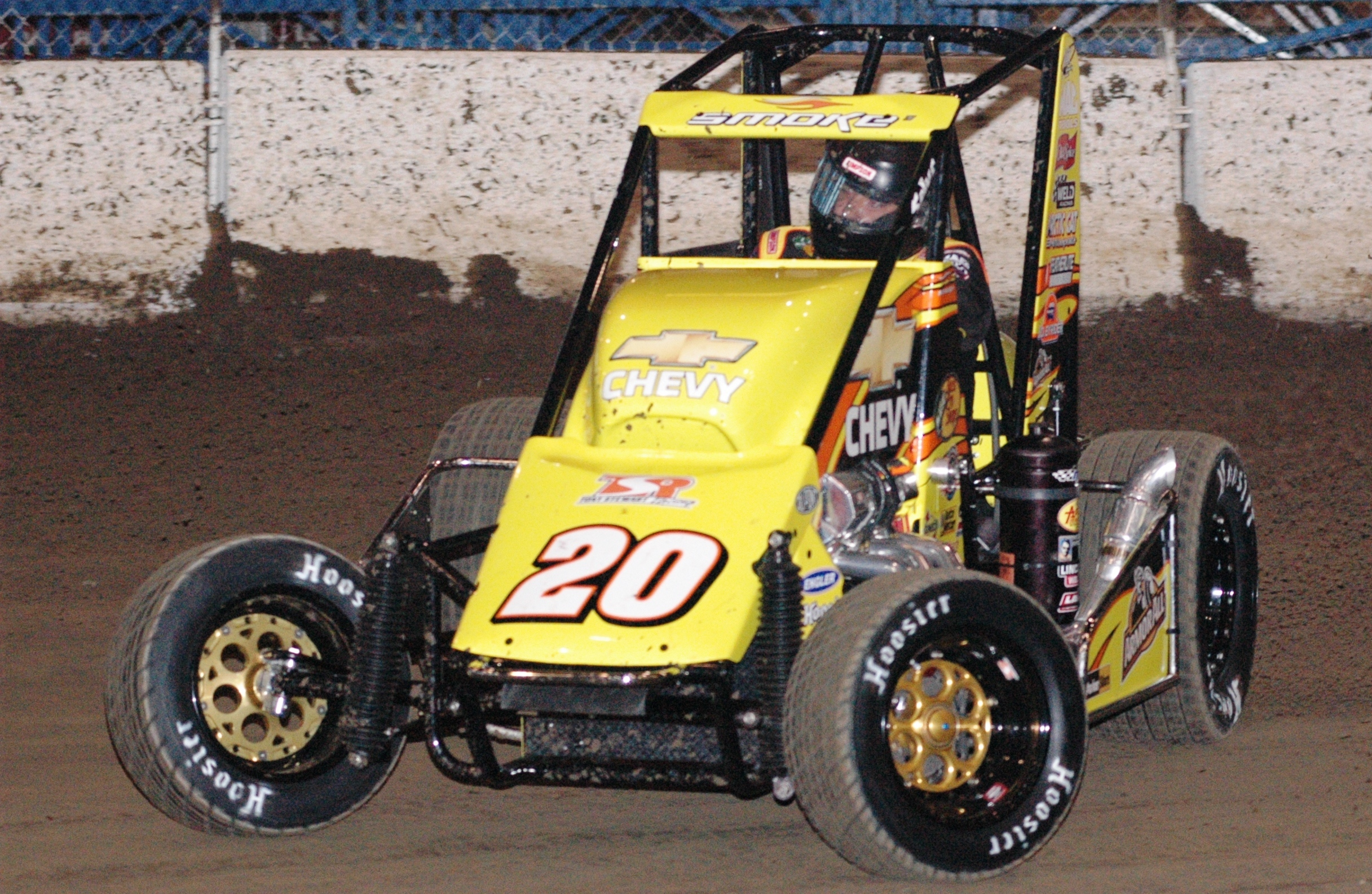
Stewart at the 2008 Chili Bowl Nationals

=== Other racing ===
Stewart has enjoyed a highly successful career in USAC; he has 27 USAC National Midget wins to his credit, as well as ten wins in the Sprint cars and three in the Silver Crown series. He is also a member of the National Midget Auto Racing Hall of Fame (2001) and the National Sprint Car Hall of Fame (2022). In addition to his USAC driving titles, he also has seven Sprint Car Owner championships as well as seven in the Silver Crown Series as an owner.

Stewart frequently makes appearances on dirt tracks, appearing regularly at an ARCA race on dirt and many prominent midget car events, USAC's Turkey Night Grand Prix, and the indoor Chili Bowl Midget Nationals.

Stewart races 410 and 360 Dirt Sprint Cars about fifty times a year throughout the United States and Canada. On July 27, 2011, Stewart won his first-ever World of Outlaws race at Ohsweken Speedway. As of October 7, 2014, Stewart has three career World of Outlaws main event victories. Stewart competes with the World of Outlaws, All-Stars, and IRA Sprint Car series when traveling between NASCAR races and on off weekends.

=== Superstar Racing Experience ===
Along with Stewart co-founding the Superstar Racing Experience, he would also drive full-time in the No. 14 machine. Stewart got a podium finish in the inaugural 2021 SRX Series race at Stafford Motor Speedway, finishing third. He followed by sweeping the series' two dirt track races at Knoxville Raceway and Eldora. A second-place finish in the final race at Nashville Fairgrounds Speedway enabled Stewart to win the championship by 45 points over Ernie Francis Jr.

== Death of Kevin Ward Jr. ==
On August 9, 2014, Stewart competed in an evening sprint car race at Canandaigua Motorsports Park in Canandaigua, New York. About halfway through the race, Stewart bumped Kevin Ward Jr., causing Ward to lose control and spin out, into the wall. A full course yellow caution flag was displayed, signaling for the cars to reduce speed. During the caution period, Ward exited his vehicle and walked onto the banked circuit to confront Stewart. Several cars tacked down to the inside lane to avoid him. As Stewart approached Ward, Stewart's car fishtailed which resulted in Ward being struck by Stewart's right rear tire. Mortally injured when the right rear tire of Stewart's car struck him, Ward was flung 25 feet (7.6 m) across the track to his death. Ward was transported by paramedics to Thompson Hospital and was pronounced dead on arrival, due to "massive blunt trauma".

The incident took place the night before Stewart was scheduled to race in the Cup Series' Cheez-It 355 at Watkins Glen International; however, Stewart decided not to compete in the event, and Regan Smith started in his place. Stewart later released a statement "There aren't words to describe the sadness I feel about the accident that took the life of Kevin Ward Jr. It's a very emotional time for all involved, and it is the reason I've decided not to participate in today's race at Watkins Glen. My thoughts and prayers are with his family, friends, and everyone affected by this tragedy."

The day after the incident, Philip Povero, sheriff of Ontario County, New York, told reporters, "At this very moment, there are no facts in hand that would substantiate or support a criminal charge, or indicate criminal intent on the part of any individual."

On August 15, 2014, NASCAR announced a rule change requiring that drivers who are involved in an accident and are unable to drive their cars back to pit road or the garage must remain in their vehicles until emergency crews arrive, except in an emergency (such as a fire or smoke caused by a blown engine).

For the August 17, 2014 race at Michigan and the following one at Bristol, Stewart was replaced by Jeff Burton. He returned at Atlanta, and was granted a waiver to maintain Chase eligibility despite missing three races (current Chase rules state that a driver must attempt to qualify for every race in order to be eligible). However, he failed to win at Atlanta or Richmond and thus was unable to qualify for the Chase.

Stewart gave a tearful interview when he returned to race in Atlanta, stating:

This has been one of the toughest tragedies I've ever had to deal with, both professionally and personally. This is something that will definitely affect my life forever. This is a sadness and a pain I hope no one ever has to experience in their life. That being said, I know that the pain and the mourning that Kevin Ward's family and friends are experiencing is something that I can't possibly imagine. I want Kevin's father, Kevin Sr., his mother Pam, and his sisters Christi, Kayla, and Katelyn to know that every day I'm thinking about and praying for them.

The racing community is a large family, as you guys know. Everyone's saddened by this tragedy. I want to thank all my friends and family for their support through this tough, emotional time. And the support from the NASCAR community, my partners, and all of our employees has been overwhelming. I've taken the last couple of weeks off out of respect for Kevin and his family and also to cope with the accident in my own way. It's given me the time to think about life and how easy it is to take it for granted. I miss my team, my teammates, and the other drivers very much, and I miss being back in the race car. I think that being back in the car this week with my racing family will help me get through this difficult time.

On September 24, 2014, a grand jury declined to indict Stewart on charges of manslaughter in the second-degree and criminally negligent homicide. Following the decision, District Attorney Michael Tantillo stated that videos of Stewart's driving did not demonstrate any aberrational driving and that Ward was under the influence of cannabis with levels high enough to impair judgment.

Ward's father, Kevin Ward Sr., wrote a letter vowing to "pursue to make all remedies for Kevin," implying the civil lawsuit they later filed. When Ward's family was informed that he had been high on cannabis, Ward Sr. wrote a letter that went viral on the internet, saying:

Tell me how a man the size of Kevin can make a sprint car turn to the right on impact. Tell me how a lap before (the incident) everything was fine, but the following lap was poor lighting. Tell me how a NASCAR star totally forgot what caution means. Maybe he should get a different headset so he is able to hear on the radio that the car in caution is up high, so go low. Or was he low until he rounded the corner and saw Kevin, Jr. standing up for himself?

A couple of days after the announcement of his exoneration by Ontario County (N.Y.) District Attorney Michael Tantillo, Stewart told The Associated Press, that "I know 100 percent in my heart and in my mind that I did not do anything wrong. This was 100 percent an accident."

After a few years of going through the process of the wrongful death lawsuit filed by the Ward family, it was announced in April 2018 that the suit had been settled out-of-court, just a few weeks before the trial was scheduled to begin. The terms of the settlement were confidential.

== Business ventures ==
=== Motorsports team ownership ===
Stewart is the owner of various open-wheel short-track racing cars, most of them being sponsored by Chevrolet since 2007. He also owns and drives dirt super late models.

==== Tri Star Motorsports ====
Tri Star Motorsports (no relation to the TriStar Motorsports NASCAR team) was an IRL team that Stewart owned with Larry Curry, Andy Card, and Rick Ehrgott from 1999 to 2001.

==== Stewart–Haas Racing ====
Following the 2008 season, Stewart was given a 50% stake in Haas CNC Racing, which was owned outright by Gene Haas and fielded Chevrolet vehicles. This allowed Stewart to become an owner-driver, as he left his long-term team at Joe Gibbs Racing to start the venture. Initially fielding two cars, the #14 for himself and the #39 for Ryan Newman, Stewart has since expanded the operation to four cars and began running with Ford engines in 2017. The team has won two NASCAR Cup Series championships, the first with Stewart driving in 2011 and the second with Kevin Harvick driving in 2014.

On May 28, 2024, it was announced that the team would shut down at the end of the 2024 season. On June 20, Gene Haas announced he will keep one of the team's four charters and restructure the team as Haas Factory Team in 2025.

==== Tony Stewart Racing ====
Stewart's Top Fuel dragster at the 2026 Sonoma Nationals

Stewart has won USAC car owner titles in the Silver Crown division in 2002 and 2003 with J. J. Yeley, in 2004 & 2005 with Dave Steele and 2010 and 2011 with Levi Jones of Olney, IL. He also collected owner titles in USAC's National Sprint Car Series with Yeley in 2003 and Jay Drake in 2004. He also won an owner title in the USAC National Sprint Car Series in 2006 with Josh Wise and 2007, 2009, 2010, and 2011 with Levi Jones of Olney, IL

Stewart's USAC midget and sprint cars carry No. 20 and No. 21, while his Silver Crown car carries No. 22.

Stewart has also won World of Outlaws Sprint Car Series championships as an owner with Donny Schatz in 2008–2009, 2012, and 2014–2018. The team was a two car operation with Schatz and Steve Kinser until Kinser's retirement in 2016. The team will compete full time in the High Limit Racing series with Rico Abreu in 2026.

In October 2021, it was reported that Tony Stewart Racing would begin fielding entries in the NHRA Camping World Drag Racing Series which will first be made up of a Top Fuel entry for Leah Pruett and a Funny Car entry for Matt Hagan. On December 7, 2023, Leah Pruett announced that Tony will be driving an NHRA Top Fuel Dragster in 2024. In 2025, he claimed his first Top Fuel win at the 2025 Four-Wide Nationals at Las Vegas Motor Speedway.

=== Motorsports venues ===
Stewart purchased Eldora Speedway, located near Rossburg, Ohio, in late 2004 from Earl Baltes. Stewart is currently a co-owner of Paducah International Raceway near Paducah, Kentucky. He also co-owns Macon Speedway in Macon, Illinois along with Kenny Schrader, Kenny Wallace, and Bob Sargent.

=== All Star Circuit of Champions ===
In January 2015, Stewart purchased the All Star Circuit of Champions from Guy Webb. The purchase was Stewart's first foray into owning an entire racing series. In a separate agreement, Stewart announced that he had reached an agreement with the owners of the Renegade Sprint Series to merge with the All Star Circuit of Champions for the 2015 season under the All Star name.

The ASCoC is an American motorsports sanctioning body of Sprint Cars founded in 1970. The series sanctions 410ci winged sprint car races in Ohio, Indiana, Pennsylvania, Michigan, Illinois, Wisconsin, New York, and Florida.

=== Superstar Racing Experience ===
In July 2020, Stewart and former NASCAR crew chief Ray Evernham formed the Superstar Racing Experience (SRX), a stock car series that began in summer 2021.

=== Other entities ===
Stewart owns a dirt late model Chevrolet Impala that carries No. 14, which he races frequently. He is also the owner of Custom Works, a company that manufactures radio-controlled oval track cars, and has had a degree of success as an r/c racer himself.

Stewart was also the driving force behind the Prelude to the Dream, a dirt late model race held at Eldora Speedway from 2005 to 2012. It featured top drivers from NASCAR, IndyCar, NHRA, and World of Outlaws, including race winners Kenny Wallace, Carl Edwards, Jimmie Johnson, Clint Bowyer, Kyle Busch, and Stewart himself. The event raised over $4 million for various NASCAR and driver charities, including The Victory Junction Gang Camp.

== Tony Stewart Foundation ==
Founded in 2003 by Stewart, the principal purposes of the Tony Stewart Foundation are to raise and donate funds to help care for chronically ill children, drivers injured in motorsports activities, and to support other charitable organizations in the protection of various animal species. The Tony Stewart Foundation will raise and donate funds to charitable interests, specifically those that support the aforementioned groups. In October 2024, it was announced that The Tony Stewart Foundation is closing.

== Career achievements ==
=== Awards and honors ===
- 1995, 2002 Hoosier Auto Racing Fans Driver of the Year
- 2001 National Midget Auto Racing Hall of Fame inductee
- 2002 Hoosier Auto Racing Fans Hall of Fame inductee
- 2002, 2005, 2011 Richard Petty Driver of the Year
- 2003, 2006, 2012 Best Driver ESPY Award recipient
- 2008 Legends of The Glen inductee
- 2008 NASCAR Illustrated Person of the Year Award recipient
- 2013 Myers Brothers Award recipient
- 2016 Sonoma Raceway Wall of Fame inductee
- 2018 Indianapolis Motor Speedway Hall of Fame inductee
- 2019 Motorsports Hall of Fame of America inductee
- 2020 NASCAR Hall of Fame inductee
- 2022 National Sprint Car Hall of Fame inductee

=== Records and milestones ===
With 49 career points-paying victories, Stewart is ranked thirteenth among the all-time NASCAR Cup Series winners; he is ranked ninth among those who have competed during the sport's modern era (1972–present).

Stewart is the only driver to complete the Indianapolis 500–Coca-Cola 600 Double Duty, finishing sixth and third, respectively, in 2001. He is also the second owner-driver to win a NASCAR championship.

Stewart is the all-time winningest Cup Series driver at the following tracks:

- Chicagoland Speedway (3)
- Homestead–Miami Speedway (3; tied with Greg Biffle and Denny Hamlin)
- Watkins Glen International (5)

== In popular media ==
=== Radio ===
Stewart hosted a two-hour weekly radio show, titled Tony Stewart Live, broadcast on Sirius Satellite Radio. Stewart co-hosted the show with Matt Yocum, and took listener calls. The show ran from 2007 to 2008.

=== Television ===
- From 1999 to 2003, Stewart worked for Turner Sports as a guest analyst on one NASCAR Busch Series race per year, one of the earliest examples of a current Cup driver doing commentary for a lower series race. Stewart called the fall Charlotte race in 1999 and 2000 alongside Allen Bestwick, and the Watkins Glen race in 2001 alongside Mike Hogewood.
- In 2007, Stewart appeared in commercials for Subway with their spokesman Jared Fogle.
- He was in a 2008 Toyota commercial where the cars of Toyota Sprint Cup drivers, including Stewart's, are driven by kids with remote controls. When his kid driver spins his car out of control, he crawls out, yelling to his crew chief, "Zippy, run for your life!" Stewart then throws his helmet at his car.
- Stewart appears in commercials as a member of the Coca-Cola Racing Family of drivers.
- In 2010, Stewart appeared in a commercial for the Burger King Steak House XT, which he endorsed. This video entered the Top 10 of the Ad Age/Visible Measures Top Viral Ad Chart on August 12, 2010.
- On February 14, 2012, Stewart guest-starred on the ABC series Last Man Standing.
- On March 17, 2013, he voiced himself in The Cleveland Show in the episode, "The Hangover Part Tubbs".
- In 2013 and 2014, Stewart appeared as himself in a special series of McLaren's cartoon Tooned in partnership with Mobil 1.
- On January 22, 2022, during the San Francisco 49ers/Green Bay Packers NFL playoff game, FOX Sports announced the addition of Stewart to the broadcast booth next month. He will join Mike Joy and Clint Bowyer in the booth for the inaugural running of the Clash at the Los Angeles Memorial Coliseum, as well as the 64th running of the Daytona 500.
- In 2023, Stewart was a part of the FOX Sports broadcast booth for both the Clash at the Los Angeles Memorial Coliseum as well as the 65th running of the Daytona 500.

=== Video games ===
- EA Sports announced that Stewart would appear in person for the first time on the cover of NASCAR Thunder 2004 in late 2003, his Home Depot Winston Cup car appeared on NASCAR 2001's cover. He also appears on the North American cover of NASCAR 08.
- Stewart is included in NASCAR 2011: The Game and NASCAR The Game: Inside Line. On December 3, 2013, it was announced that he would appear on the cover of NASCAR '14.
- In 2019, Stewart and his Stewart–Haas Racing drivers were featured on the NASCAR Heat 4 cover; he also appears as a playable driver and dirt team owner in the game's Career Mode. The following year, he was included on the cover of NASCAR Heat 5's Gold Edition.
- In 2020, Stewart partnered with Monster Games for Tony Stewart's Sprint Car Racing. The game, which features Stewart's All Stars Circuit of Champions, was released on February 14, 2020. A second game, Tony Stewart's All American Racing, came out on September 4.
- In 2021, a third game, "SRX: The Game" came out on May 28, 2021. It featured 305 Sprints, Stadium Trucks, Late Models, and the Camping World SRX series. A free DLC including Super Late Models and 6 additional asphalt tracks was released later, along with a physical copy of the game. It is available on Xbox One, Xbox Series X|S, PS4, PS5, and Steam.

=== Other media ===
- He appeared with Dale Earnhardt Jr. in the music video for 3 Doors Down's song "The Road I'm On".
- Stewart is mentioned in the song "Glory" by Lil Wayne off his Free Weezy Album.
- Stewart is mentioned in the song "Slow Down" by Clyde Carson featuring The Team.
- Stewart is mentioned in the song "Set It Off" by Boosie Badazz.
- He appeared in the 2005 film Herbie: Fully Loaded, along with other NASCAR drivers, having his car driven over by Herbie and being one of four cars that boxed Herbie in.
- Stewart is mentioned in Eminem's verse on the Shady Records "SHADY CXVPHER" video promoting the compilation album Shady XV, specifically referencing the Kevin Ward Jr. incident.
- In K-pop group Blackpink's music video for "Ddu-Du Ddu-Du", group member Lisa is seen wearing a vintage Stewart jacket from when he raced for Joe Gibbs Racing.
- Stewart is mentioned in the song "Really Got It" by Jerreau.
- While the song did not use his name, Stewart's number 14 was referenced in the Brad Paisley song "Country Nation". At the time of the song's 2015 release, Stewart was still driving the No. 14 car in NASCAR. Every driver referenced in the song (Stewart, Jeff Gordon, Dale Earnhardt Jr., and Jimmie Johnson) has since retired or semi-retired from the sport.
- Stewart has appeared in YouTube videos with rallycross driver Ken Block and drag racer Leah Pruett, both affiliated with the car channel Hoonigan. In March 2021, Stewart announced his engagement to Pruett. They married on November 21, 2021, in Los Cabos, Mexico.

== Motorsports career results ==
=== Indy Racing League ===
(key) (Races in bold indicate pole position; races in italics indicate fastest lap)

Indy Racing League results
Year	Team	No.	Chassis	Engine	1	2	3	4	5	6	7	8	9	10	11	12	13	Rank	Points	Ref
1996	Team Menard	20	Lola	Menard-Buick	WDW; 2	PHX; 11	INDY; 24											8th	204	
1996–97	Team Menard	2	Lola	Menard-Buick	NHA; 12	LVS; 21												1st	278	
1996–97	Team Menard	2	G-Force	Oldsmobile			**WDW**; 10	**PHX**; 2	INDY; 5	**TXS**; 5	PPIR; 1	**CLT**; 7	NHA; 14	LVS; 11				1st	278	
1998	Team Menard	1	G-Force	Oldsmobile	**WDW**; 1	PHX; 2				**DOV**; 8								3rd	289	
1998	Team Menard	1	Dallara	Oldsmobile			INDY; 33	**TXS**; 14	NHA; 1		**CLT**; 21	PPIR; 3	ATL; 5	TX2; 20	LVS; 14			3rd	289	
1999	Tri-Star Racing	22	Dallara	Oldsmobile	WDW	PHX	CLT^{1} C	INDY; 9	TXS	PPIR	ATL	DOV	PPIR	LVS	TXS			33rd	22	
2001	Chip Ganassi Racing	33	G-Force	Oldsmobile	PHX	HOM	ATL	INDY; 6	TXS	PPIR	RCH	KAN	NSH	KEN	GAT	CHI	TXS	39th	28	

^{1} The VisionAire 500K was abandoned after three spectators were killed when debris from a crash on the track went into the grandstands.

==== Indianapolis 500 ====
Year	Chassis	Engine	Start	Finish	Team
1996	Lola	Menard-Buick	**1**	24	Menard
1997	G-Force	Oldsmobile	2	5	Menard
1998	Dallara	Oldsmobile	4	33	Menard
1999	Dallara	Oldsmobile	24	9	Tri-Star
2001	G-Force	Oldsmobile	7	6	Ganassi

=== NASCAR ===
(key) (Bold – Pole position awarded by qualifying time. Italics – Pole position earned by points standings or practice time. * – Most laps led.)

==== Sprint Cup Series ====
NASCAR Sprint Cup Series results
Year	Team	No.	Make	1	2	3	4	5	6	7	8	9	10	11	12	13	14	15	16	17	18	19	20	21	22	23	24	25	26	27	28	29	30	31	32	33	34	35	36	NSCC	Pts	Ref
1999	Joe Gibbs Racing	20	Pontiac	DAY; 28	CAR; 12	LVS; 36	ATL; 11	DAR; 6	TEX; 6	BRI; 15	**MAR**; 20	TAL; 5	CAL; 4	RCH; 15	CLT; 4	DOV; 4*	MCH; 9	POC; 6	SON; 15	DAY; 6	NHA; 10*	POC; 4	IND; 7	GLN; 6	MCH; 3	**BRI**; 5*	DAR; 12	RCH; 1*	NHA; 2	DOV; 2	MAR; 41	CLT; 19	TAL; 6	CAR; 12	PHO; 1*	HOM; 1	ATL; 15			4th	4774	
2000	Joe Gibbs Racing	20	Pontiac	DAY; 17	CAR; 4	LVS; 2	ATL; 34	DAR; 4	BRI; 42	TEX; 9	MAR; 6	TAL; 34	CAL; 10	RCH; 8	CLT; 14	DOV; 1*	MCH; 1	POC; 6	SON; 10	DAY; 6	NHA; 1*	**POC**; 26	IND; 5	GLN; 6	MCH; 41	BRI; 2	DAR; 9	RCH; 6	NHA; 23	DOV; 1*	**MAR**; 1	CLT; 4	TAL; 27	CAR; 7	PHO; 14	HOM; 1*	ATL; 38			6th	4570	
2001	Joe Gibbs Racing	20	Pontiac	DAY; 36	CAR; 4	LVS; 12	ATL; 27	DAR; 16	BRI; 25	TEX; 23	MAR; 7	TAL; 2	CAL; 4	RCH; 1	CLT; 3	DOV; 7	MCH; 25	POC; 7	SON; 1	DAY; 26	CHI; 33	NHA; 5	POC; 3	IND; 17	GLN; 26	MCH; 27	BRI; 1	DAR; 4	RCH; 7	DOV; 5	KAN; 8	CLT; 2	MAR; 41	TAL; 2	PHO; 5	CAR; 7	HOM; 19*	ATL; 9	NHA; 5	2nd	4763	
2002	Joe Gibbs Racing	20	Pontiac	DAY; 43	CAR; 4	LVS; 5*	ATL; 1*	DAR; 36	BRI; 15	TEX; 5	MAR; 3*	TAL; 29	CAL; 29	RCH; 1	CLT; 6	DOV; 11	POC; 7	MCH; 16	**SON**; 2	DAY; 39	CHI; 3	NHA; 39	POC; 7	**IND**; 12	GLN; 1*	MCH; 2	BRI; 24	DAR; 8	RCH; 30	NHA; 3	DOV; 5	KAN; 8	TAL; 2	CLT; 3	MAR; 11	ATL; 4	CAR; 14	PHO; 8	HOM; 18	1st	4800	
2003	Joe Gibbs Racing	20	Chevy	DAY; 7	CAR; 20	LVS; 5	ATL; 5	DAR; 10	BRI; 26	TEX; 34	TAL; 25	MAR; 6	CAL; 41*	RCH; 41	CLT; 40	DOV; 4	POC; 1	MCH; 8	SON; 12	DAY; 21	**CHI**; 2*	NHA; 22	POC; 37	IND; 12*	GLN; 11	MCH; 3	BRI; 23	DAR; 12	RCH; 27	NHA; 20	DOV; 3	TAL; 3	KAN; 4	CLT; 1*	MAR; 3	ATL; 2*	PHO; 18	CAR; 9	HOM; 7	7th	4549	
2004	Joe Gibbs Racing	20	Chevy	DAY; 2*	CAR; 26	LVS; 3	ATL; 7*	DAR; 17	BRI; 24	TEX; 8	MAR; 14	TAL; 22	CAL; 16	RCH; 4	CLT; 9	DOV; 2*	POC; 27	MCH; 24	SON; 15	DAY; 5	CHI; 1*	NHA; 5	POC; 35	IND; 5	GLN; 1*	MCH; 9	BRI; 19	CAL; 18	RCH; 19	NHA; 39	DOV; 6	TAL; 6	KAN; 14	CLT; 10	MAR; 15	ATL; 9	PHO; 8	DAR; 17	HOM; 4	6th	6326	
2005	Joe Gibbs Racing	20	Chevy	DAY; 7*	CAL; 17	LVS; 10	ATL; 17	BRI; 3	MAR; 26*	TEX; 31	PHO; 33	TAL; 2	DAR; 10	RCH; 2	CLT; 24	DOV; 15	POC; 29	MCH; 2*	SON; 1*	**DAY**; 1*	CHI; 5	NHA; 1*	POC; 7	IND; 1*	GLN; 1*	MCH; 5	BRI; 8	CAL; 5	RCH; 7	**NHA**; 2*	DOV; 18	TAL; 2*	KAN; 4	CLT; 25	**MAR**; 2*	ATL; 9	TEX; 6	PHO; 4	HOM; 15	1st	6533	
2006	Joe Gibbs Racing	20	Chevy	DAY; 5	CAL; 43	LVS; 21	ATL; 5	BRI; 12*	MAR; 1*	TEX; 3*	PHO; 2	TAL; 2	RCH; 6	DAR; 12	CLT; 42	DOV; 25	POC; 3	MCH; 41	SON; 28	DAY; 1*	CHI; 32	NHA; 37	POC; 7	IND; 8	GLN; 2	MCH; 3	BRI; 22	CAL; 9	RCH; 18	NHA; 2	DOV; 33	KAN; 1	TAL; 22	CLT; 13	MAR; 4	ATL; 1*	TEX; 1*	PHO; 14	HOM; 15	11th	4727	
2007	Joe Gibbs Racing	20	Chevy	DAY; 43	CAL; 8	LVS; 7	ATL; 2	BRI; 35*	MAR; 7	TEX; 25	PHO; 2*	TAL; 28	RCH; 8	DAR; 6	CLT; 6	DOV; 40	POC; 5	MCH; 3	SON; 6	NHA; 12	DAY; 38	CHI; 1*	IND; 1*	POC; 6	GLN; 1	MCH; 10	BRI; 4	CAL; 13	RCH; 2	NHA; 3	DOV; 9	KAN; 39	TAL; 8	CLT; 7	MAR; 13	ATL; 30	TEX; 11	PHO; 4	HOM; 30	6th	6242	
2008	Joe Gibbs Racing	20	Toyota	DAY; 3	CAL; 7	LVS; 43	ATL; 2	BRI; 14*	MAR; 5	TEX; 7	PHO; 14	TAL; 38*	RCH; 4	DAR; 21	CLT; 18	DOV; 41	POC; 35	MCH; 5	SON; 10	NHA; 13*	DAY; 20	CHI; 5	IND; 23	POC; 2	GLN; 2	MCH; 12	BRI; 8	CAL; 22	RCH; 2	NHA; 8	DOV; 11	KAN; 40	TAL; 1*	CLT; 11	MAR; 26	ATL; 17	TEX; 16	PHO; 22	HOM; 9	9th	6202	
2009	Stewart–Haas Racing	14	Chevy	DAY; 8	CAL; 8	LVS; 26	ATL; 8	BRI; 17	MAR; 3	TEX; 4	PHO; 2	TAL; 23	RCH; 2	DAR; 3	CLT; 19	DOV; 2	POC; 1	MCH; 7	SON; 2	NHA; 5	DAY; 1*	CHI; 4	IND; 3	POC; 10	GLN; 1*	MCH; 17	BRI; 33	ATL; 11	RCH; 17	NHA; 14	DOV; 9	KAN; 1	CAL; 5	CLT; 13	MAR; 9	TAL; 35	TEX; 6	PHO; 25	HOM; 22	6th	6309	
2010	Stewart–Haas Racing	14	Chevy	DAY; 22	CAL; 9	LVS; 7	ATL; 13	BRI; 2	MAR; 26	PHO; 23	**TEX**; 32	TAL; 16	RCH; 23	DAR; 23	DOV; 9	CLT; 15	POC; 3	MCH; 5	SON; 9	NHA; 2	DAY; 25	CHI; 9	IND; 5	**POC**; 2	GLN; 7	MCH; 6	BRI; 27	ATL; 1*	RCH; 16	NHA; 24	DOV; 21	KAN; 4	CAL; 1	CLT; 21	MAR; 24	TAL; 31	TEX; 11	PHO; 17	HOM; 8	7th	6221	
2011	Stewart–Haas Racing	14	Chevy	DAY; 13	PHO; 7	LVS; 2*	BRI; 19	CAL; 13	MAR; 34	TEX; 12	TAL; 17	RCH; 9	DAR; 7	DOV; 29	CLT; 17	KAN; 8	POC; 21	MCH; 7	SON; 39	DAY; 11	KEN; 12	NHA; 2	IND; 6	POC; 11	GLN; 27	MCH; 9	BRI; 28	ATL; 3	RCH; 7	CHI; 1	NHA; 1	DOV; 25	KAN; 15	**CLT**; 8	TAL; 7*	MAR; 1	TEX; 1*	PHO; 3*	HOM; 1	1st	2403	
2012	Stewart–Haas Racing	14	Chevy	DAY; 16	PHO; 22	LVS; 1*	BRI; 14	CAL; 1	MAR; 7	TEX; 24	KAN; 13	RCH; 3	TAL; 24	DAR; 3	CLT; 25	DOV; 25	POC; 3	MCH; 2	SON; 2	KEN; 32	DAY; 1	NHA; 12	IND; 10	POC; 5	GLN; 19	MCH; 32	BRI; 27	**ATL**; 22	RCH; 4	CHI; 6	NHA; 7	DOV; 20	TAL; 22	CLT; 13	KAN; 5	MAR; 27	TEX; 5	PHO; 19	HOM; 17	9th	2311	
2013	Stewart–Haas Racing	14	Chevy	DAY; 41	PHO; 8	LVS; 11	BRI; 31	CAL; 22	MAR; 17	TEX; 21	KAN; 21	RCH; 18	TAL; 27	DAR; 15	CLT; 7	DOV; 1	POC; 4	MCH; 5	SON; 28	KEN; 20	DAY; 2	NHA; 26	IND; 4	POC; 9	GLN	MCH	BRI	ATL	RCH	CHI	NHA	DOV	KAN	CLT	TAL	MAR	TEX	PHO	HOM	29th	594	
2014	Stewart–Haas Racing	14	Chevy	DAY; 35	PHO; 16	LVS; 33	BRI; 4	CAL; 5	MAR; 17	**TEX**; 10	DAR; 9	RCH; 26	TAL; 43	KAN; 20	CLT; 13	DOV; 7	POC; 13	MCH; 11	SON; 19	KEN; 11	DAY; 40	NHA; 7	IND; 17	POC; 36	GLN; QL^{†}	MCH	BRI	ATL; 41	RCH; 15	CHI; 18	NHA; 30	DOV; 14	KAN; 17	CLT; 21	TAL; 34	MAR; 4	TEX; 11	PHO; 20	HOM; 43	25th	799	
2015	Stewart–Haas Racing	14	Chevy	DAY; 42	ATL; 30	LVS; 33	PHO; 39	CAL; 14	MAR; 20	TEX; 24	BRI; 6	RCH; 41	TAL; 19	KAN; 39	CLT; 21	DOV; 16	POC; 21	MCH; 28	SON; 12	DAY; 14	KEN; 33	NHA; 20	IND; 28	POC; 9	GLN; 43	MCH; 21	BRI; 19	DAR; 15	RCH; 29	CHI; 25	NHA; 11	DOV; 26	CLT; 26	KAN; 35	TAL; 25	MAR; 10	TEX; 42	PHO; 27	HOM; 29	28th	695	
2016	Stewart–Haas Racing	14	Chevy	DAY	ATL	LVS	PHO	CAL	MAR	TEX	BRI	RCH; 19	TAL; 6	KAN; 12	DOV; 34	CLT; 24	POC; 34	MCH; 7	SON; 1	DAY; 26	KEN; 5	NHA; 2	IND; 11	POC; 5	GLN; 5	BRI; 30	MCH; 21	DAR; 35	RCH; 33	CHI; 16	NHA; 23	DOV; 13	CLT; 9	KAN; 16	TAL; 32	MAR; 26	TEX; 31	PHO; 15	HOM; 22	15th	2211	
^{†} - Qualified but replaced by Regan Smith

===== Daytona 500 =====
Year	Team	Manufacturer	Start	Finish
1999	Joe Gibbs Racing	Pontiac	2	28
2000	Joe Gibbs Racing	Pontiac	7	17
2001	Joe Gibbs Racing	Pontiac	24	36
2002	Joe Gibbs Racing	Pontiac	6	43
2003	Joe Gibbs Racing	Chevrolet	8	7
2004	Joe Gibbs Racing	Chevrolet	5	2
2005	Joe Gibbs Racing	Chevrolet	4	7
2006	Joe Gibbs Racing	Chevrolet	15	5
2007	Joe Gibbs Racing	Chevrolet	3	43
2008	Joe Gibbs Racing	Toyota	6	3
2009	Stewart–Haas Racing	Chevrolet	5	8
2010	Stewart–Haas Racing	Chevrolet	6	22
2011	Stewart–Haas Racing	Chevrolet	25	13
2012	Stewart–Haas Racing	Chevrolet	3	16
2013	Stewart–Haas Racing	Chevrolet	13	41
2014	Stewart–Haas Racing	Chevrolet	21	35
2015	Stewart–Haas Racing	Chevrolet	7	42

==== Nationwide Series ====
NASCAR Nationwide Series results
Year	Team	No.	Make	1	2	3	4	5	6	7	8	9	10	11	12	13	14	15	16	17	18	19	20	21	22	23	24	25	26	27	28	29	30	31	32	33	34	35	NNSC	Pts	Ref
1995		31	Chevy	DAY	CAR	RCH	ATL	NSV	DAR	BRI	HCY	NHA	NZH	CLT	DOV	MYB	GLN	MLW	TAL	SBO	IRP	MCH	BRI	DAR	RCH	DOV	CLT	CAR	HOM; DNQ										N/A	0	
1996	Ranier-Walsh Racing	15	Pontiac	DAY; 21	CAR; DNQ	RCH	ATL; 39	NSV	DAR	BRI; 16	HCY	NZH	CLT	DOV; 17	SBO	MYB; DNQ	GLN	MLW; 22	NHA	TAL; 26	IRP; DNQ	MCH	BRI; 37	DAR; 20	RCH; 40	DOV	CLT	CAR	HOM										49th	753	
1997	Labonte Motorsports	44	Pontiac	DAY	CAR	RCH	ATL	LVS	DAR	HCY	TEX	BRI	NSV	TAL	NHA	NZH	CLT	DOV	SBO	GLN	MLW	MYB	GTW	IRP; 34	MCH	BRI	DAR	RCH; 40	DOV	CLT; 3	CAL	CAR; 9	HOM; 37						57th	459	
1998	Joe Gibbs Racing	44	Pontiac	DAY; 31	**CAR**; 2	LVS; 34	NSV; 17	DAR	BRI; 26	TEX; 15	HCY; 13	TAL; 28	NHA; 2	NZH	CLT	DOV; 3	RCH	PPR; 14	GLN	MLW; 12	MYB; 35	CAL	SBO	IRP; 12	MCH	BRI; 21	DAR; 16	RCH; 29	DOV	CLT; 32	GTW; 5	**CAR**; 18	ATL; 3	HOM; 39					21st	2455	
2003	Chance 2 Motorsports	8	Chevy	DAY	CAR	LVS	DAR	BRI	TEX	TAL	NSH	CAL	RCH	GTW	NZH	CLT	DOV	NSH	KEN	MLW	DAY	CHI	NHA	PPR	IRP	MCH; 11*	BRI	DAR	RCH	DOV	KAN	CLT	MEM	ATL	PHO	CAR	HOM		109th	140	
2004	Richard Childress Racing	29	Chevy	DAY	CAR	LVS	DAR	BRI	TEX	NSH	TAL	CAL; 2	GTW	RCH	NZH																								58th	563	
2004	Kevin Harvick Incorporated	29	Chevy													CLT; 5	DOV	NSH	KEN	MLW	DAY	CHI	NHA	PPR	IRP														58th	563	
2004	Chance 2 Motorsports	81	Chevy																							MCH; DNQ	BRI	CAL	RCH	DOV	KAN; 25*	CLT	MEM						58th	563	
2004	Kevin Harvick Incorporated	92	Chevy																															ATL; 11	PHO	DAR	HOM		58th	563	
2005	Kevin Harvick Incorporated	33	Chevy	DAY; 1*	**CAL**; 29	MXC	LVS	ATL; 2	NSH	BRI	TEX; 42	PHO; 5	TAL; 20	DAR	RCH; 15	CLT; 39	DOV	NSH	KEN	MLW	DAY	CHI	NHA	PPR	GTW	IRP; 23	**GLN**; 4	MCH	BRI	CAL									39th	1317	
2005	Kevin Harvick Incorporated	83	Chevy																												RCH; 40	DOV	KAN						39th	1317	
2005	Joe Gibbs Racing	19	Chevy																															CLT; 21	MEM	TEX	PHO	HOM	39th	1317	
2006	Kevin Harvick Incorporated	33	Chevy	DAY; 1	CAL	MXC	LVS; 12	ATL	BRI	TEX	NSH	PHO	TAL; 39	RCH	DAR; 29	CLT; 42	DOV	NSH	KEN	MLW	DAY; 12	CHI; 9	NHA	MAR	GTW	IRP	GLN	MCH; 11	BRI	CAL; 6	RCH	DOV	KAN; 4						37th	1461	
2006	Dale Earnhardt, Inc.	8	Chevy																															CLT; 16	MEM				37th	1461	
2006	Joe Gibbs Racing	19	Chevy																																	TEX; 2	PHO	HOM	37th	1461	
2007	Kevin Harvick Incorporated	33	Chevy	DAY; 8			LVS; 3						TAL; 2	RCH	DAR; 7	CLT	DOV	NSH	KEN	MLW	NHA; 4		CHI; 8	GTW	IRP	CGV	GLN	MCH; 30	BRI	CAL	RCH	DOV	KAN; 11	CLT	MEM				35th	1723	
2007	Joe Gibbs Racing	18	Chevy		CAL; 11	MXC																DAY; 4														TEX; 7*	PHO	HOM	35th	1723	
2007	Joe Gibbs Racing	20	Chevy					ATL; 10	BRI	NSH	TEX	PHO																											35th	1723	
2008	Joe Gibbs Racing	20	Toyota	**DAY**; 1	CAL; 1*	LVS; 27	ATL	BRI	NSH	TEX; 10	PHO	MXC	**TAL**; 1*	RCH	DAR; 1*	CLT	DOV	NSH	KEN	MLW	NHA; 1*	DAY	CHI; 9	GTW	IRP	CGV	GLN	MCH; 3	BRI	CAL	RCH	DOV	KAN	CLT	MEM	TEX	PHO	HOM	39th	1354	
2009	Hendrick Motorsports	80	Chevy	DAY; 1	CAL	LVS	BRI																																72nd	500	
2009	Kevin Harvick Incorporated	33	Chevy					TEX; 2	NSH	PHO	TAL	RCH	DAR	CLT	DOV	NSH	KEN	MLW	NHA	DAY	CHI	GTW	IRP	IOW	GLN	MCH	BRI	CGV	ATL	RCH	DOV	KAN	CAL						72nd	500	
2009	JR Motorsports	5	Chevy																															CLT; 11	MEM	TEX	PHO	HOM	72nd	500	
2010	Kevin Harvick Incorporated	4	Chevy	DAY; 1*	CAL	LVS	BRI	NSH	PHO	TEX	TAL	RCH	DAR	DOV	CLT	NSH	KEN	ROA	NHA	DAY	CHI	GTW	IRP	IOW	GLN	MCH	BRI	CGV	ATL	RCH	DOV	KAN	CAL	CLT	GTW	TEX	PHO	HOM	93rd	195	
2011	Kevin Harvick Incorporated	4	Chevy	DAY; 1	PHO	LVS	BRI	CAL	TEX	TAL	NSH	RCH	DAR	DOV	IOW	CLT	CHI	MCH	ROA																				95th	0^{1}	
2011	Kevin Harvick Incorporated	9	Chevy																	DAY; 13	KEN	NHA	NSH	IRP	IOW	GLN	CGV	BRI	ATL	RCH	CHI	DOV	KAN	CLT	TEX	PHO	HOM		95th	0^{1}	
2012	Richard Childress Racing	33	Chevy	DAY; 8	PHO	LVS	BRI	CAL	TEX	RCH	TAL	DAR	IOW	CLT	DOV	MCH	ROA	KEN	DAY	NHA	CHI	IND	IOW	GLN	CGV	BRI	ATL	RCH	CHI	KEN	DOV	CLT	KAN	TEX	PHO	HOM			121st	0^{1}	
2013	Richard Childress Racing	33	Chevy	DAY; 1	PHO	LVS	BRI	CAL	TEX	RCH	TAL	DAR	CLT	DOV	IOW	MCH	ROA	KEN	DAY	NHA	CHI	IND	IOW	GLN	MOH	BRI	ATL	RCH	CHI	KEN	DOV	KAN	CLT	TEX	PHO	HOM			96th	0^{1}	

==== Craftsman Truck Series ====
NASCAR Craftsman Truck Series results
Year	Team	No.	Make	1	2	3	4	5	6	7	8	9	10	11	12	13	14	15	16	17	18	19	20	21	22	23	24	25	NCTC	Pts	Ref
1996	Mueller Brothers Racing	4	Chevy	HOM	PHO	POR	EVG	TUS	CNS	HPT	BRI	NZH	MLW	LVL	I70	IRP; 10	FLM	GLN	NSV	RCH	NHA	MAR	NWS	SON	MMR	PHO	LVS		94th	134	
2002	Andy Petree Racing	33	Chevy	DAY	DAR	MAR	GTW	PPR	DOV	TEX	MEM	MLW	KAN	KEN	NHA	MCH	IRP	NSH	RCH; 1	TEX	SBO	LVS	CAL	PHO	HOM				69th	180	
2003	Andy Petree Racing	33	Chevy	DAY	DAR	MMR	MAR	CLT	DOV	TEX	MEM	MLW	KAN	KEN	GTW	MCH	IRP	NSH	BRI	RCH; 1	NHA	CAL	LVS	SBO	TEX	MAR	PHO	HOM	85th	180	
2004	Morgan-Dollar Motorsports	47	Chevy	DAY	ATL	MAR	MFD	CLT	DOV	TEX	MEM	MLW	KAN	KEN	GTW	MCH	IRP	NSH	BRI	RCH; 3	NHA	LVS	CAL	TEX	MAR	PHO	DAR	HOM	69th	165	
2005	Morgan-Dollar Motorsports	47	Chevy	DAY	CAL	ATL	MAR	GTW	MFD	CLT; 33	DOV; 2	TEX	MCH	MLW	KAN	KEN	MEM	IRP	NSH	BRI									61st	234	
2005	Kevin Harvick Inc.	92	Chevy																		RCH; DNQ	NHA	LVS	MAR	ATL	TEX	PHO	HOM	61st	234	
2026	Kaulig Racing	25	Ram	DAY; 36	ATL	STP	DAR	CAR	BRI	TEX	GLN	DOV	CLT	NSH	MCH	COR	LRP	NWS	IRP	RCH	NHA	BRI	KAN	CLT	PHO	TAL; 34	MAR	HOM	87th	4	

==== Whelen Modified Tour ====
NASCAR Whelen Modified Tour results
Year	Car owner	No.	Make	1	2	3	4	5	6	7	8	9	10	11	12	13	14	15	16	NWMTC	Pts	Ref
2006		94	Chevy	TMP	STA	JEN	TMP	STA	NHA; 9	HOL	RIV	STA	TMP	MAR	TMP	NHA	WFD	TMP	STA	56th	138	

^{1} Ineligible for series points

=== ARCA Re/Max Series ===
(key) (Bold – Pole position awarded by qualifying time. Italics – Pole position earned by points standings or practice time. * – Most laps led.)

ARCA Re/Max Series results
Year	Team	No.	Make	1	2	3	4	5	6	7	8	9	10	11	12	13	14	15	16	17	18	19	20	21	22	23	24	25	ARSC	Pts	Ref
2001	Larry Clement	40	Ford	DAY	NSH	WIN	SLM	GTW	KEN	CLT	KAN	MCH	POC	MEM	GLN	KEN	MCH	POC	NSH	ISF	CHI	**DSF**; 2	SLM	TOL	BLN	CLT	TAL	ATL	104th	250	
2002	Andy Petree Racing	55	Chevy	DAY	ATL	NSH	SLM	KEN	CLT	KAN	POC	MCH	TOL	SBO	KEN	BLN	POC	NSH	ISF	WIN	**DSF**; 2	CHI	SLM	TAL	CLT				103rd	250	
2003	Tony Stewart	18	Chevy	DAY	ATL	NSH	SLM	TOL	KEN	CLT	BLN	KAN	MCH	LER	POC	POC	NSH	ISF	WIN	**DSF**; 1*	CHI	SLM	TAL	CLT	SBO				113th	225	

=== International Race of Champions ===
(key) (Bold – Pole position. * – Most laps led.)

International Race of Champions results
Year	Make	1	2	3	4	Pos.	Points	Ref
1998	Pontiac	**DAY**; 9	CAL; 7	MCH; 3	IND; 6	6th	37	
2000	Pontiac	DAY; 2	TAL; 6	MCH; 2	IND; 3	3rd	57	
2001	Pontiac	DAY; 9	**TAL**; 10	MCH; 1*	IND; 2	2nd	58	
2002	Pontiac	DAY; 1	CAL; 6	CHI; 12	IND; 11	6th	42	
2006	Pontiac	DAY; 8	TEX; 1	DAY; 1*	ATL; 3	1st	72	

=== Rolex Sports Car Series ===
(key) (Races in bold indicate pole position, Results are overall/class)

Rolex Sports Car Series results
Year	Team	Make	Engine	Class	1	2	3	4	5	6	7	8	9	10	11	12	13	14	15	Rank	Points
2002	Crawford Racing	Crawford	Judd	SR	DAY (46/11)	HOM	FTR	PHO	WGL	DAY (5/5)	WGL	VIR	CMT	DAY						28th	46
2004	Howard Boss Motorsports	Crawford	Chevrolet	DP	DAY (5/3)	HOM	PHO	MON	WGL											37th	83
2004	Howard Boss Motorsports	Crawford	Pontiac	DP						DAY (3/3)	MOH	WGL (8/8)	HOM	VIR	BAR	CAL				37th	83
2005	Howard Boss Motorsports	Crawford	Pontiac	DP	DAY (3/3)	HOM	CAL	LAG	CMT	WAT1	BAR	WAT2	DAY2 (22/18)	MOH	PHX	WAT3 (37/21)	VIR	MEX		56th	53
2006	Howard Boss Motorsports	Crawford	Pontiac	DP	DAY (30/15)	MEX	HOM	LBH	VIR	LAG	PHX	LRP	WAT1	DAY2	BAR	WAT2	INF	MIL		117th	16
2007	Howard Motorsports	Crawford	Porsche	DP	DAY (48/24)	MEX	HOM	VIR	LAG	LRP	WAT1	MOH	DAY2	IOW	CGV	BAR	WAT2	INF	MIL	122nd	7

=== Superstar Racing Experience ===
(key) * – Most laps led. ^{1} – Heat 1 winner. ^{2} – Heat 2 winner.

Superstar Racing Experience results
Year	No.	1	2	3	4	5	6	SRXC	Pts
2021	14	STA; 3	KNX; 1*^{1}	ELD; 1^{1}	IRP; 7	SLG; 3	NSV; 2	1st	237
2022	14	FIF; 10	SBO; 1*	STA; 4	NSV; 11	I-55; 1*	SHA; 2	4th	188
2023	14	STA I 11	STA II; 7^{1}	MMS; 3	BER; 7	ELD; 1*^{1}^{2}	LOS; 7	4th	166

== See also ==
- List of NASCAR race wins by Tony Stewart

Sporting positions
Preceded by Buzz Calkins; Scott Sharp	Indy Racing League Champion; 1997	Succeeded by Kenny Bräck
Preceded by Jeff Gordon	NASCAR Winston Cup Series Champion; 2002	Succeeded by Matt Kenseth
Preceded by Kurt Busch	NASCAR Nextel Cup Series Champion; 2005	Succeeded by Jimmie Johnson
Preceded by Jimmie Johnson	NASCAR Sprint Cup Series Champion; 2011	Succeeded by Brad Keselowski
Preceded by Mark Martin	IROC Champion; IROC XXX (2006)	Succeeded by Final
Achievements
Preceded by Kenny Wallace; Carl Edwards	Prelude to the Dream Winner; 2006; 2008, 2009	Succeeded by Carl Edwards; Jimmie Johnson
Preceded by Jeff Gordon; Jimmie Johnson	Brickyard 400 winner 2005; 2007	Succeeded by Jimmie Johnson
Awards
Preceded by Christian Fittipaldi	Indianapolis 500 Rookie of the Year; 1996	Succeeded by Jeff Ward
Preceded by Kenny Irwin Jr.	NASCAR Winston Cup Series Rookie of the Year; 1999	Succeeded by Matt Kenseth
Preceded by (Germany) Michael Schumacher (Germany) Michael Schumacher (United States) Jimmie Johnson	Best Driver ESPY Award; 2003; 2006; 2012	Succeeded by (United States) Dale Earnhardt Jr. (United States) Jeff Gordon (United States) Ryan Hunter-Reay
