= List of NASCAR video games =

NASCAR, the most popular stock car racing organization in the United States, has worked with video game developers to design several video games. In 2003, EA Sports received an exclusive console license to produce NASCAR games, eliminating Papyrus and Sans as competitors. In May 2009, iRacing.com received a license to run NASCAR-sanctioned online racing starting in 2010. In June 2009 at the E3 Gaming Expo, NASCAR was revealed to be a part of the Gran Turismo series for the first time in Gran Turismo 5 for the PlayStation 3.

== Developers ==
=== Papyrus Design Group ===
In 1994, Papyrus Design Group, an up-and-coming simulation racing developer (at the time) that was best known for the IndyCar Racing series, released the first installation to the NASCAR Racing series into the video game market.

Over the next decade Papyrus teamed with Sierra Entertainment and continued producing games for their NASCAR Racing series. The NASCAR Racing games were universally praised for their accuracy in terms of physics and track feel, with NASCAR Cup and Xfinity (formerly Nationwide) Series drivers regularly practicing for upcoming tracks using the games. Prior to sweeping both races at Pocono in 2006, Denny Hamlin had only seen the track in NASCAR Racing 2003 Season.

=== Electronic Arts ===
Electronic Arts, through their EA Sports banner, developed NASCAR games for the Sony PlayStation, Sega Saturn, and Nintendo 64 under names such as NASCAR 98, NASCAR 99, NASCAR 2000 and NASCAR Road Racing. Also, a big hit for the company was NASCAR Rumble, a spin-off of the normal NASCAR racing games. The company expanded into NASCAR games for PC, Game Boy Color for their 2000 game, and the PlayStation 2 for their 2001 game, the last under the old name. For 2002, the series was renamed NASCAR Thunder, and by 2003, has simultaneously been released on GameCube, Xbox, PlayStation 2, Microsoft Windows, and PlayStation.

EA Sports decided to split their old "Thunder" titles into two separate racing lines; one for consoles focused on gameplay, and one for PC, which attempted to focus on technical accuracy in the spirit of the old Papyrus/Sierra lines – indeed the PC game used many former members of the Papyrus development teams (although David Kaemmer was not involved). The games were given differing names, as to not confuse the two, with the console series renamed NASCAR 2005: Chase for the Cup (released in 2004, a reference to the new NASCAR playoff format) and the PC series renamed NASCAR SimRacing (released in 2005). Sweeping gameplay changes meant that the "Chase for the Cup" name was dropped from the 2006 edition of the console game. Instead, the game was titled NASCAR 06: Total Team Control. The new name is derived from the new feature by which a player who has teammates in the field can actually switch to their teammates' cars and control them during a race. It was released on August 30, 2005. Released on September 6, 2006, NASCAR 07 was EA Sports' tenth game in the series. NASCAR 09 was the final game in the EA Sports NASCAR series. It is available on Xbox 360 and PlayStation 3, as well as PlayStation 2. The NASCAR series took a different approach in 2009, as EA introduced NASCAR Kart Racing on the Wii console. It was later announced that EA would not make a NASCAR 10, and the series is currently on hiatus because of a drop in sales and now has lost the license they had with NASCAR since 2003.

=== 2010–present ===
Starting in 2010, EA's license to make NASCAR games expired. Gran Turismo 5 features NASCAR in the game with cars from 2010 season and some tracks on the NASCAR schedule; 2011 season cars were added later in an update. Also, iRacing.com and NASCAR started an Online Racing Series which started in 2010 and the NASCAR Peak Antifreeze Series later that year. iRacing and NASCAR had a close partnership and by the start of the 2014 season, the simulation had every car make/model that has run in Sprint Cup from 2013 and 2014 seasons and every track that the NASCAR Sprint Cup Series on the simulation. Other games that came out with NASCAR licensing after 2010 included Days of Thunder: Arcade (based on Days of Thunder), which is a game sold as an Xbox Live Arcade or PlayStation Network game for the Xbox 360 and PS3.

==== Eutechnyx ====
In 2010, Eutechnyx began creating games based on NASCAR starting in 2011 with NASCAR The Game: 2011. NASCAR The Game: Inside Line was released on November 6, 2012. Afterwards, Eutechnyx made two new games: the first NASCAR licensed video game for iOS, and NASCAR The Game: 2013 for Steam. Eutechnyx switched publishers for NASCAR '14 to Deep Silver after having Activision publishing previous games of the NASCAR The Game series. DMi Games replaced Eutechnyx for NASCAR '15 on January 1, 2015.

==== Dusenberry Martin Racing / 704Games/ Motorsport Games ====
Dusenberry Martin Racing took over the NASCAR license and began developing new games in 2016, as well as releasing a Eutechnyx-developed update game for the 2015 season. DMR is an American-based company located in the NASCAR Plaza building in Uptown, Charlotte, North Carolina. The company is headed by former Hasbro Interactive CEO Tom Dusenberry (developers of the NASCAR Heat series) and Ed Martin, former executive at Papyrus, Hasbro, Atari, EA Sports, and most recent licensee Eutechnyx. DMR partnered with NASCAR Heat developer Monster Games to create NASCAR Heat Evolution which was released in 2016 to mixed reviews, .

In 2017, DMR rebranded to 704Games and hired former NASCAR Media Group President, NASCAR Senior Vice President and DMR chairman Paul Brooks as CEO. From 2017 to 2019 704 released NASCAR Heat 2 to 4 to mixed reviews. In August 2018 Motorsport Games acquired a majority interest in 704 Games and thus the NASCAR game license with it. In 2020 Motorsport games would be listed as the publisher for NASCAR Heat 5 that was developed by 704 games which received mixed reviews. and would develop and publish NASCAR 21: Ignition which released to mixed reception and 2022's NASCAR Rivals.

==== iRacing ====
On October 5, 2023, it was announced that Motorsport Games sold the console game license for the exclusive NASCAR video game to iRacing. iRacing would later develop and publish NASCAR 25 which released on consoles in October 2025 and Windows in November 2025. NASCAR 26 was announced on June 18th, 2026 during the NASCAR San Diego race weekend and released on September 18th with the Gold Edition releasing three days early on the 15th.

=== Other ===
Other NASCAR games include Hasbro Interactive's NASCAR Heat; Papyrus' NASCAR Legends, which took players back to the 1970 season, featuring a different point system, and many different tracks. There is also a pinball game: 3-D Ultra NASCAR Pinball. This game was based on the NASCAR Racing 3 engine; EA Sports' NASCAR Revolution (released between NASCAR 99, which came out in 1998, and NASCAR 2000, which came out in 1999); and NASCAR Rumble, an EA game incorporating some of the features of Nintendo's Mario Kart series, but with NASCAR car designs. Gran Turismo 5 featured NASCAR as one of several new licenses that was included in the game. NASCAR has also partnered with Roblox experience "Jailbreak" twice in both 2021 and 2023 and has created their own experience titled, "NASCAR SPEED HUB."

=== List ===
==== Simulation/realism ====
Title	Release date	Platform(s)	Developer	Publisher	NASCAR Season
Richard Petty's Talladega	1984	C64, Atari 8-bit	Cosmi	Cosmi	No license
Days of Thunder	1990	Amiga, Atari ST, C64, MS-DOS, Game Boy, NES, ZX Spectrum	Argonaut Software	Mindscape Group	No license
Bill Elliott's NASCAR Challenge	April 1991	Amiga, MS-DOS, Mac, NES	Konami	Konami	1991
NASCAR Racing	October 1994	PC, Mac, PlayStation	Papyrus	Sierra	1994, 1996 (PS)
Kyle Petty's No Fear Racing	April 1995	Super NES	Williams Entertainment	Williams Entertainment	1995
NASCAR Racing 2	December 9, 1996	PC	Papyrus	Sierra	1996
NASCAR 98	August 31, 1997	Sega Saturn, PlayStation	Stormfront Studios	EA Sports	1997
NASCAR 99	September 11, 1998	Nintendo 64, PlayStation	Stormfront Studios	EA Sports	1998
NASCAR Racing 1999 Edition	November 1998	PC	Papyrus	Sierra	1998
NASCAR Revolution	January 31, 1999; October, 1999 (SE)	PC	Stormfront Studios	EA Sports	1998, 1999 (SE)
NASCAR Craftsman Truck Racing	April 1, 1999	PC	Papyrus	Sierra	1998
NASCAR Racing 3	August 31, 1999	PC	Papyrus	Sierra	1999
NASCAR 2000	September 30, 1999	PC, Nintendo 64, Game Boy Color, PlayStation	Stormfront Studios	EA Sports	1999
NASCAR Legends	November 22, 1999	PC	Papyrus	Sierra	1970
NASCAR Arcade	September 2000	Arcade	Sega AM3/Electronic Arts	Sega	1999
NASCAR 2001	September 19, 2000	PlayStation, PlayStation 2	Black Box	EA Sports	2000
NASCAR Heat	September 27, 2000	PlayStation, Game Boy Color, PC	Monster Games	Hasbro Interactive	2000
NASCAR Racing 4	February 6, 2001	PC	Papyrus	Sierra	2001
NASCAR Thunder 2002	October 2, 2001	PlayStation, Xbox, PlayStation 2	EA Tiburon	EA Sports	2001
NASCAR Heat 2002	November 14, 2001	PlayStation 2, Game Boy Advance, Xbox	Monster Games	Atari/Infogrames	2001
NASCAR Racing 2002 Season	February 14, 2002	PC, Mac	Papyrus	Sierra	2002
NASCAR Thunder 2003	September 19, 2002	PC, PlayStation, PlayStation 2, Xbox, GameCube	EA Tiburon	EA Sports	2002
NASCAR: Dirt to Daytona	November 11, 2002	PlayStation 2, GameCube	Monster Games	Infogrames	2002
NASCAR Racing 2003 Season	February 14, 2003	PC, Mac	Papyrus	Sierra	2003
NASCAR Thunder 2004	September 16, 2003	PC, PlayStation, PlayStation 2, Xbox	EA Tiburon	EA Sports	2003
NASCAR 2005: Chase for the Cup	August 31, 2004	PlayStation 2, Xbox, GameCube	EA Tiburon	EA Sports	2004
NASCAR SimRacing	February 15, 2005	PC	EA Tiburon	EA Sports	2005
NASCAR 06: Total Team Control	August 30, 2005	PlayStation 2, Xbox	EA Tiburon	EA Sports	2005
NASCAR 07	September 6, 2006	PlayStation 2, Xbox, PSP	EA Tiburon	EA Sports	2006
NASCAR 08	July 23, 2007	PlayStation 2, PlayStation 3, Xbox 360	EA Tiburon	EA Sports	2007
NASCAR 09	June 10, 2008	PlayStation 2, PlayStation 3, Xbox 360	EA Tiburon	EA Sports	2008
NASCAR The Game: 2011	March 29, 2011	PlayStation 3, Xbox 360, Wii	Eutechnyx	Eutechnyx, Activision	2010, 2011
NASCAR The Game: Inside Line	November 6, 2012	PlayStation 3, Xbox 360, Wii	Eutechnyx	Eutechnyx, Activision	2012, 2013
NASCAR The Game: 2013	July 24, 2013	PC	Eutechnyx	Eutechnyx, Activision	2013
NASCAR '14	February 18, 2014	PlayStation 3, Xbox 360, PC	Eutechnyx	Eutechnyx, Deep Silver	2014
NASCAR '15	May 22, 2015; October 14, 2015 (Victory Edition)	PlayStation 3, Xbox 360, PC	Eutechnyx	Eutechnyx, Deep Silver, Dusenberry Martin Racing	2015, 2016
NASCAR Heat Evolution	September 13, 2016	PlayStation 4, Xbox One, PC	Monster Games	704Games	2016
NASCAR Heat 2	September 12, 2017	PlayStation 4, Xbox One, PC	Monster Games, 704Games	704Games	2017
NASCAR Heat 3	September 7, 2018	PlayStation 4, Xbox One, PC	Monster Games, 704Games	704Games	2018
NASCAR Heat 4	September 13, 2019	PlayStation 4, Xbox One, PC	Monster Games, 704Games	704Games	2019
NASCAR Heat 5	July 10, 2020	PlayStation 4, Xbox One, PC	704Games	Motorsport Games	2020, 2022
NASCAR 21: Ignition	October 28, 2021	PlayStation 4, Xbox One, PlayStation 5, Xbox Series X/S, PC	Motorsport Games		2021, 2022
NASCAR Heat Ultimate Edition+	November 19, 2021	Nintendo Switch	704Games	Motorsport Games	2020, 2021
NASCAR Rivals	October 14, 2022	Nintendo Switch	Motorsport Games		2022
NASCAR 25	October 14, 2025	PlayStation 5, Xbox Series X/S, PC	iRacing Studios	iRacing Studios	2025
NASCAR 26	September 18, 2026	PlayStation 5, Xbox Series X/S, PC	iRacing Studios	iRacing Studios	2026

==== Arcade/Casual/Management/Mobile/Other ====
Title	Release date	Platform(s)	Developer	Publisher
Bill Elliott's NASCAR Fast Tracks	December 1, 1991	Game Boy	Distinctive Software	Konami
3-D Ultra NASCAR Pinball	1998	PC, Mac	Dynamix	Sierra
NASCAR Road Racing	May 26, 1999	PC	Dice Multimedia	EA Sports
NASCAR Challenge	November 15, 1999	Game Boy Color	Morning Star Multimedia	Hasbro Interactive
Trivial Pursuit: NASCAR	1999	PC	Hasbro Interactive	Hasbro Interactive
NASCAR Rumble	January 31, 2000	PlayStation	EA Redwood Shores	Electronic Arts
NASCAR Racers	2000	PlayStation, Game Boy Color, PC	Majesco	Majesco
NASCAR	2005	Leapster L-MAX	Torus Games	LeapFrog Enterprises
EA Sports NASCAR Racing	August 3, 2007	Arcade	EA Tiburon	EA Sports, Global VR
Days of Thunder	February 5, 2009	iPhone	Piranha Games	Freeverse
NASCAR Kart Racing	February 10, 2009	Wii	EA Tiburon	EA Sports Freestyle
Days of Thunder: Arcade	February 22, 2011	PlayStation Network, Xbox Live Arcade	Piranha Games	Paramount Digital Entertainment
NASCAR Unleashed	November 1, 2011	PlayStation 3, Xbox 360, Wii, 3DS	Firebrand Games	Activision
NASCAR Red Line	October 3, 2013	iPhone, iPad, Android	Eutechnyx Limited	Eutechnyx Limited, Activision
NASCAR Heat Mobile	March 8, 2017; April 25, 2017	iPhone, iPad, Android	704Games	704Games
NASCAR Rush	December 17, 2017	iPhone, iPad, Android	704Games	704Games
NASCAR Manager	November 21, 2023	Android, iOS	Hutch Games	Hutch Games
Nascar Arcade Rush	September 15, 2023	PlayStation 4, PlayStation 5, Xbox One, Xbox Series X/S, Nintendo Switch, PC	Team6 Game Studios	GameMill Entertainment

== Games with NASCAR as a non-core element ==
This list includes games that have a NASCAR license but are not based specifically around it (such as racing simulators with other series/disciplines of racing worked into them, or which have mods which add NASCAR cars and/or tracks).

Title	Release date	Platform(s)	Developer	Publisher
TrackMania	November 2003	Microsoft Windows, Nintendo DS, Wii	Nadeo	Enlight
Rigs of Rods	August 5, 2005	Microsoft Windows, Linux, Mac OS	Pierre-Michel Ricordel	OGRE
FlatOut 2	August 1, 2006	Microsoft Windows, Mac OS X, PlayStation 2, Xbox, PlayStation Portable	Bugbear Entertainment	Empire Interactive
RFactor	August 31, 2006	Microsoft Windows	Image Space Incorporated	Image Space Incorporated
Roblox	September 1, 2006	Android, iOS, Microsoft Windows, Xbox One, Xbox Series X and Series S, Fire OS, Mac operating systems, PlayStation 4, PlayStation 5	Roblox Corporation	Roblox Corporation
ARCA Sim Racing '08	March 5, 2008	Microsoft Windows	The Sim Factory	The Sim Factory
iRacing	August 26, 2008	PC	iRacing Studios	iRacing Studios
Gran Turismo 5	November 24, 2010	PlayStation 3	Polyphony Digital	Sony Computer Entertainment
Test Drive Unlimited 2	February 8, 2011	PlayStation 3, Xbox 360, PC	Eden Games	Atari
TrackMania 2	August 17, 2011	PC	Nadeo	Ubisoft
Forza Motorsport 4	October 11, 2011	Xbox 360	Turn 10 Studios	Microsoft Studios
Real Racing 3	February 28, 2013 (first NASCAR update released in September 2015)	iOS, Android	Firemonkeys	Electronic Arts
Gran Turismo 6	December 5, 2013	PlayStation 3	Polyphony Digital	Sony Computer Entertainment
Project CARS	May 8, 2015	PC, PlayStation 4, Xbox One	Slightly Mad Studios	Slightly Mad Studios
Forza Motorsport 6	September 15, 2015 (NASCAR expansion released on May 17, 2016)	Xbox One	Turn 10 Studios	Microsoft Studios
Fortnite	July 21, 2017 (NASCAR content added to Rocket Racing on July 3, 2024)	macOS, Windows, PlayStation 4, Xbox One, iOS, Nintendo Switch, Android, Xbox Series X/S, PlayStation 5	Epic Games	Epic Games
Forza Motorsport 7	October 3, 2017	Microsoft Windows (Windows 10 only), Xbox One	Turn 10 Studios	Microsoft Studios
Wreckfest	June 14, 2018	Steam, Xbox One, PlayStation 4	Bugbear Entertainment	THQ Nordic
Shell Racing	May 17, 2019	iOS, Android	BrandBase B.V	Shell Racing
Rocket League	July 7, 2015	Steam, Xbox One, PlayStation 4	Panic Button	Psyonix
The Crew Motorfest	September 14, 2023 (NASCAR content released on March 4, 2026)	Microsoft Windows, Xbox One, Xbox Series X/S, PlayStation 4, PlayStation 5, Nintendo Switch 2	Ubisoft Ivory Tower	Ubisoft
Forza Motorsport (2023)	October 10, 2023 (NASCAR update released on November 7, 2024)	Microsoft Windows, Xbox Series X/S	Turn 10 Studios	Xbox Game Studios
Automobilista 2	June 30, 2020 (NASCAR content released on December 23, 2025)	Microsoft Windows	Reiza Studios	Reiza Studios

== See also ==
- Daytona USA – stock car racing series created by Sega
