= Nazareth Speedway =

Motorsport track in the United States

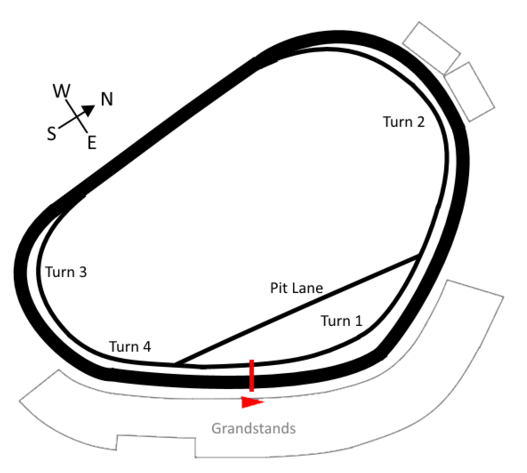
- Oval (1987–2004)
- Location: Lower Nazareth Township, Pennsylvania, U.S.
- Coordinates: 40°43′41″N 75°19′08″W
- Capacity: 45,000
- Owner: Raceway Properties, LLC (November 2015–present); International Speedway Corporation (1999–2004); Roger Penske (1986–1999)
- Opened: 1910
- Closed: 2004
- Former names: Nazareth Speedway (1994–2004); Pennsylvania International Raceway (1985–1993); Nazareth National Speedway (1910–1984)
- Major events: IndyCar Firestone Indy 225 (2002–2004); CART Bosch Spark Plug Grand Prix (1987–2001); NASCAR Busch Series Goulds Pumps/ITT Industries 200 (1988–2004); NASCAR Craftsman Truck Series Chevy Silverado 200 (1996–2001); Marlboro Challenge (1990, 1992)

Oval (1987–2004)
- Surface: Asphalt
- Length: 0.946 mi (1.522 km)
- Turns: 5
- Banking: Turn 1 and Straightaways: 2.7° Turns 2 & 3: 3° Turns 4 & 5 4°
- Race lap record: 0:19.514 ( (Canada) Greg Moore, Reynard 98I, 1998, CART)

Original Oval (1966–1984)
- Surface: Dirt
- Length: 1.125 mi (1.810 km)
- Turns: 4
- Race lap record: 0:38.310 ( (United States) Mario Andretti, Kuzma 60 D, 1969, U.S.A.C. IndyCar)

Nazareth Speedway is an American auto racing facility in Lower Nazareth Township in the Lehigh Valley region of eastern Pennsylvania, which operated from 1910 to 2004. The racing facility operated in two distinct course configurations. In its early years, it was a dirt twin oval layout. In 1987, it was reopened as a paved 0.946 mi (1.522 km) tri-oval that measured just slightly under 1 mile.

The facility is often linked to local drivers Mario and Michael Andretti's early racing careers. It was also associated fan favorite George "bud" Gilliland and Frankie Schneider due to his large number of wins on the two dirt tracks.

In November 2015, the site was purchased by Raceway Properties LLC under David Jaindl; There were plans to return racing to the facility. As of 2026, the track is abandoned and in a state of disrepair with much of the track's infrastructure (such as grandstands) having been removed. The track's racing surface still exists though it is in disrepair.

== Track history ==
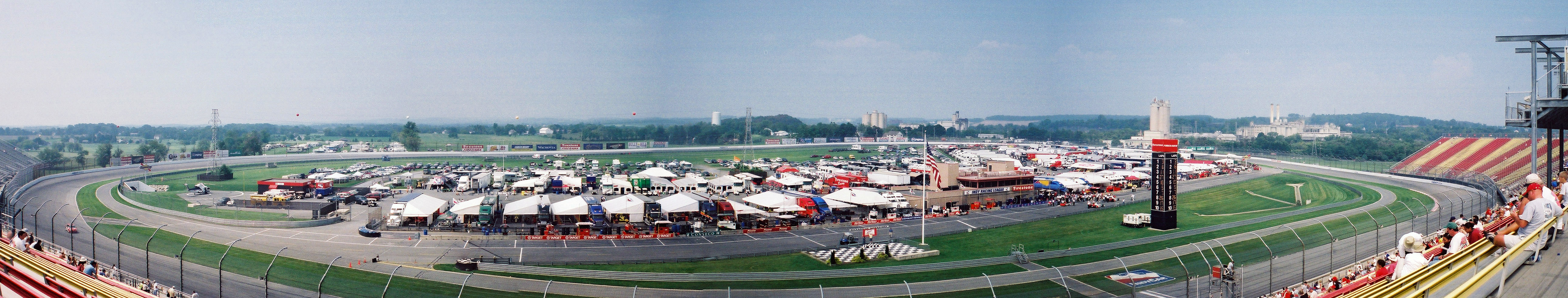
Nazareth Speedway in 2004

Nazareth Speedway started as a horse racing track farther up in the center of the town in the 1850s known as the Northampton County Agricultural Fairgrounds. As the crowds grew, the location grew too crowded to remain in the center of the town. Around 1900, a new 0.500 mi (0.805 km) mile dirt track was constructed at the current location between Route 191 and 248. The site began hosting motor racing events in the 1910s.

In 1966, an additional 1.125 mi (1.811 km) dirt track was added. In 1986, Roger Penske bought the property, and subsequently paved the big track. The small track was demolished and the site was replaced by the expanding of a nearby grocery store in 1988.

=== Dirt track (small) ===
The 0.500 mi (0.805 km) mile dirt track was constructed in the 1900s as a horse racing track. The first automotive events held at the location were not racing, instead it was a sport called auto polo. Following the Great Depression the first large race that happened at the small track would be held in 1947 by the American Automobile Association. The race included 35 cars, and attracted a crowd of 11,000 spectators.

In 1952, Jerry Fried purchased the fairgrounds. He continued the racing, and added in additional events, such as demolition derbies. The track was also the location of one of the first enduro races on the east coast. The 1/2 mile small dirt track continued to operate weekly during the closing of the large track from 1971 to 1982.

In the time period the small track was open, Buzzie Reutimann won 33 races, leading to the 1972 and 1973 track titles.

During Roger Penske's ownership in 1988, the small track was sold to nearby Laneco supermarket and demolished.

=== Dirt track (large) ===
The big track opened in April 1966, as a five-turn 1.125 mi (1.811 km) dirt track named Nazareth National Speedway. The track featured modified races. Frankie Schneider had a clean sweep at the event - he had the fastest qualifying time, won his heat race, and won the feature event. The event turned out to be the only event at the track in that season.

The track held nine events in 1967, which was the most events the track hosted in one season. Schneider won five of the races.

In 1968, the track hosted five modified events. Schneider won three of them. Al Tasnady started near last in the August 24, 1968 modified event, and won the race by lapping all drivers except Schneider. USAC Dirt Champ cars raced at the track on July 13, 1968. The race was won by Al Unser, who beat local driver Mario Andretti.

Mario Andretti won the USAC dirt champ car race in 1969. In addition, Rags Carter won four consecutive events. Buzzie Reutimann won a 150 lap race in 1971. Frankie Schneider won eleven races total at the track, the most of any driver.

In 1971, the large track was closed, and would remain closed until facility was purchased by Lindy Vicari in 1982. Vicari cleared eleven years of plant overgrowth, refurbished the facilities, and shortened the large track to a one-mile (1.6 km) dirt oval. His idea was to host a series of high-paying special events for USAC's Championship Dirt Cars and Modifieds. The races that he staged there drew big crowds, large competition, and much acclaim.

Maintaining the two dirt tracks turned out to be a larger financial burden than expected, and Vicari closed the two tracks. Brightbill's $50,000 victory in a 125-mile Modified contest on October 9, 1983, was the last race that was run there under Vicari's direction. The facility remained closed for three years.

=== Paved track ===
The facility and a large amount of property behind it was purchased by Roger Penske in 1986. Penske built a new paved oval track on the footprint of the old 1.125 mi (1.811 km) mile dirt oval. At the same time, he sold the section of the property that held the old 0.500 mi (0.805 km) mile small dirt track to the owners of Laneco, a former grocery store chain. Laneco built a new store on the site of the original track, which is now home to a Giant grocery store.

Penske's new track opened as Pennsylvania International Raceway in the fall of 1987. It was paved in asphalt, and had very modest banking. The elevation change during the lap was significant, as the backstretch ran steeply downhill for a drop of approximately 30 feet. The remainder of the track trekked mostly uphill. It was the first racing oval to feature a warm-up lane to enter and exit the pits, designed in part by driver Rick Mears. In 1993, the track was renamed Nazareth Speedway. In 1997, the facility underwent improvements, including a new retaining wall, catch fence, and new grandstands.

In 1999, Penske Motorsports (which at the time owned Nazareth, Michigan, Fontana, and Rockingham) merged with International Speedway Corporation. ISC subsequently took majority control of all four of those tracks.

=== Track length of paved oval ===
The paved track opened in 1987 and closely resembled the 1.125 mi (1.811 km) dirt track layout. However, the length was shortened to 0.946 mi (1.522 km), and the turns were reconfigured to widen the radii. Though advertised as a 1-mile tri-oval, it actually measured less than one mile in length. The banking varied between 2.7° and 6.0°. The back straight was 1200 feet and main straight was 800 feet. Participants were known to exploit the inaccurate measurement for fuel strategy, knowing that they were running a shorter distance than officially advertised.

In 1997, for fairness and accuracy, the track was remeasured by the CART sanctioning body, and was advertised as 0.946 mi (1.522 km) in length. The race, which had been 200 laps, was increased to 225 laps for time value purposes. This length was used between 1997 and the last CART race in 2001. The IRL used in 2002, 2003 and 2004 a length of 0.935 mi (1.505 km) for timing and scoring. However, NASCAR stayed to a length of exactly 1 mile until its closing in 2004.

=== Closing ===
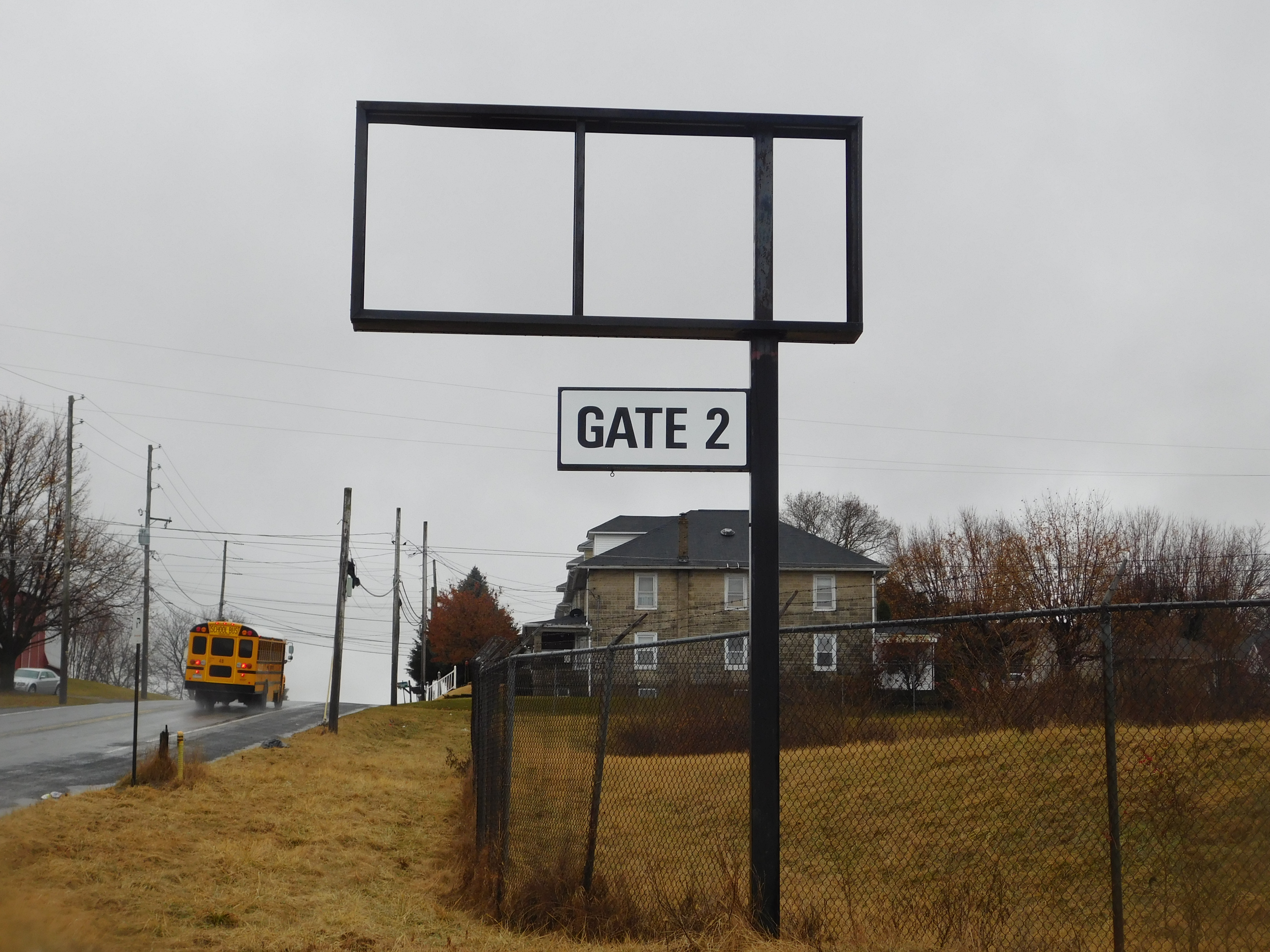
Nazareth Speedway signage at Gate 2 along PA 191

Although the Nazareth Speedway hosted rather successful Busch Series and CART events, new owner ISC closed the facility in late 2004. The races were replaced with events at Watkins Glen, another ISC-owned track. Access to the speedway was severely limited, and reopening as a professional motorsports facility was highly unlikely. As of May 2007, the grandstands, signage and all visible structures at the racetrack have been removed. The disassembled grandstands were transported and erected at Watkins Glen and Michigan International Speedway. The track remains fenced off and access to any part of the track or land surrounding it is restricted. Historical Google Earth imagery shows that by May 2008, large piles of earth were erected at various points around the track to prevent use of the racing surface. Images as of September 2020 show those piles remain in place, though show signs of weathering.

Although the track closed in 2004, it is still featured in the EA Sports video games NASCAR SimRacing, NASCAR 2005: Chase for the Cup, NASCAR 06: Total Team Control, NASCAR 07, NASCAR 08 (PS2), and NASCAR 09 (PS2), which are based on the 2004, 2005, 2006, 2007, and 2008 NASCAR seasons, respectively. For the 2006-2009 games, the track was considered a fantasy track.

=== Redevelopment ===
In November 2015, Raceway Properties LLC purchased the property. As part of the offer, there is a clause that states that racing remains banned from returning to the property. The property is currently zoned as general commercial property, with the most recent plans being to convert sections to residential zoning and build a warehouse for local business, C. F. Martin & Company.

== Lap records ==
The unofficial fastest all-time track record on the reconfigured 0.946-mile Oval is 0:18.419 seconds, set by Patrick Carpentier in a Reynard 98I, during qualifying for the 1998 Bosch Spark Plug Grand Prix. The fastest official race lap records at Nazareth Speedway are listed as:

Category	Time	Driver	Vehicle	Event
Reconfigured Oval (1987–2004): 0.946 mi (1.522 km)
CART	0:19.514	Greg Moore	Reynard 98I	1998 Bosch Spark Plug Grand Prix
Indy Lights	0:22.635	Greg Moore	Lola T93/20	1995 Nazareth Indy Lights round
Formula Atlantic	0:23.058	Rodolfo Lavín	Swift 008.a	2001 Nazareth Formula Atlantic round

== Race winners ==
=== USAC Championship Car Series ===
==== Nazareth 100 (Dirt) ====
- 1968 Al Unser
- 1969 Mario Andretti
- 1982 Keith Kauffman

=== NASCAR Craftsman Truck Series ===
==== DeVilbiss Superfinish 200 ====
- 1996 Jack Sprague (Race shortened to 152 laps/152 miles due to rain)

==== NAPA AutoCare 200 ====
- 1997 Jack Sprague
- 1998 Ron Hornaday
- 1999 Greg Biffle

==== Chevy Silverado 200 ====
- 2000 Dennis Setzer
- 2001 Greg Biffle

=== NASCAR Whelen Modified Tour ===
- 1991 Jan Leaty
- 1992 Jeff Fuller
- 1993 Tim Connolly
- 1994 Jeff Fuller
- 1995 Tony Hirschman
- 1996 Jan Leaty
- 1997 Mike Stefanik
- 1998 Mike Stefanik
- 1999 Eddie Flemke Jr.
- 2000 Mike Stefanik
- 2001 Mike Ewanitsko
- 2002 Nevin George
- 2003 Ted Christopher
- 2004 Todd Szegedy

=== IROC ===
- 1989 Danny Sullivan

== In popular culture ==
Mark Knopfler wrote a song about a season of racing concluding at Nazareth Speedway titled "Speedway at Nazareth". The song appears on Knopfler's second solo album, Sailing to Philadelphia.

== See also ==
- Lake Erie Speedway, Erie County, south of North East, Pennsylvania
- Pocono Raceway
