= Benny Parsons =

American racing driver and journalist (1941–2007)

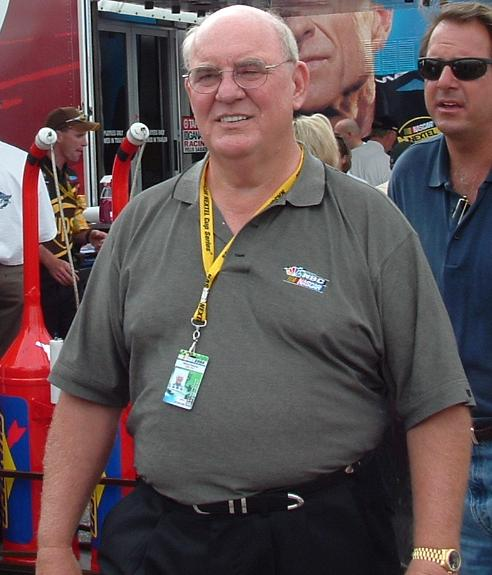
- Born: Benjamin Stewart Parsons; July 12, 1941; Wilkesboro, North Carolina, U.S.
- Died: January 16, 2007 (aged 65); Charlotte, North Carolina, U.S.
- Cause of death: Complications resulting from lung cancer
- Achievements: 1973 Winston Cup Series Champion; 1968 ARCA Racing Series Champion; 1969 ARCA Racing Series Champion; 1975 Daytona 500 Winner; 1980 World 600 Winner; 1969 Daytona ARCA 300 Winner; 1982 Daytona 500 Pole Sitter
- Awards: 1965 ARCA Racing Series Rookie of the Year; Named one of NASCAR's 50 Greatest Drivers (1998); International Motorsports Hall of Fame (1994); Court of Legends at Charlotte Motor Speedway (1994); Motorsports Hall of Fame of America (2005); ESPN Emmy (1996); ACE Award (1989); NASCAR Hall of Fame (2017); Named one of NASCAR's 75 Greatest Drivers (2023)1988, Inducted into the Michigan Motorsports Hall of Fame

NASCAR Cup Series career
- 526 races run over 21 years
- Best finish: 1st (1973)
- First race: 1964 (Weaverville)
- Last race: 1988 Atlanta Journal 500 (Atlanta)
- First win: 1971 Halifax County 100 (South Boston)
- Last win: 1984 Coca-Cola 500 (Atlanta)
Wins	Top tens	Poles
21	283	20

NASCAR Grand National East Series career
- 2 races run over 2 years
- Best finish: 33rd (1973)
- First race: 1972 Buddy Shuman 300 (Hickory)
- Last race: 1973 Sunoco 260 (Hickory)
Wins	Top tens	Poles
0	2	0
- Statistics up to date as of October 31, 2013.

Benjamin Stewart Parsons (July 12, 1941 – January 16, 2007) was an American NASCAR driver, and later an announcer/analyst/pit reporter on SETN, TBS, ABC, ESPN, NBC, and TNT. He became famous as the 1973 NASCAR Winston Cup Series champion, and was a 2017 NASCAR Hall of Fame inductee. He was the older brother of former NASCAR driver, car owner, and broadcaster Phil Parsons of Phil Parsons Racing.

Parsons was nicknamed "BP" and "the Professor", the latter in part because of his popular remarks and relaxed demeanor.

== Early life ==
Parsons was born in Wilkes County, North Carolina. He spent his childhood years in the Blue Ridge Mountains of North Carolina and played football at Millers Creek High School (now known as West Wilkes High School). Following high school, he moved to Detroit, Michigan where his father operated a taxicab company. Parsons worked at a gas station and drove cabs in Detroit before beginning his racing career. While working at the gas station one day, a couple of customers towing a race car invited him to a local race track. The driver of the car never showed up for that evening's race, and Parsons drove the car in a race for the first time later that night. Benny later moved to Ellerbe, North Carolina and always called it home.

== Driving career ==
=== 1960s ===
Parsons began his NASCAR career by running a single race in 1964 for Holman-Moody with a young Cale Yarborough.

Parsons won the 1968 and 1969 ARCA championships, and then moved to Ellerbe, North Carolina.

Parsons had three top-ten finishes in four NASCAR races in 1969.

=== 1970s ===
Benny joined the NASCAR circuit full-time in 1970 with crew chief John Hill. He had 23 top-ten finishes in 45 races, a pole at Langley Field Speedway, and finished eighth in the final point standings. He raced the No. 72 car for L.G. DeWitt/DeWitt Racing.

Parsons had eighteen top-ten finishes in 35 starts in 1971, including his first win at South Boston Speedway. He finished eleventh in the points.

In 1972, Parsons had nineteen top-ten finishes in 31 races. He finished fifth in the final points standings.

In 1973, Parsons won the NASCAR Winston Cup Series Championship with only one win, even though David Pearson won eleven races, although Pearson had only entered eighteen events. Parsons' consistency likely won him the championship: he had 21 top-ten and fifteen top-five finishes in the 28 events.

Parsons' improbable return to the track after an early crash cemented his 1973 championship at Rockingham, North Carolina. He saw his championship hopes start to fade as he was involved in a lap thirteen crash and his car was heavily damaged. He took to the pits to muster whatever he could out of the car and hope for a top five finish in the final standings. The rest of the garage was hoping to see the underdog unseat the mighty Richard Petty and joined in to help Parsons' crew put the car back together. Parsons miraculously got back on the track 136 laps later and completed enough laps to finish 25th and take the 1973 championship. Richard Petty, with the championship in his sights after winning the pole and seeing Parsons' accident, had engine trouble and was relegated to a 35th-place finish. The poor performance dropped Petty all the way to fifth in the final standings, as Cale Yarborough took the runner up spot on the season with his third-place effort. Yarborough finished 67 points behind the champion.

Parsons became the only person to win both ARCA and NASCAR championships.

Parsons finished between third and fifth in the final points standings from 1974 to 1980, and won the 1975 Daytona 500. He switched to the No. 27 entry for M.C. Anderson starting in 1979.

In 1979 at North Wilkesboro Speedway, Bobby Allison led most of the race, but in the final 150 laps, Darrell Waltrip caught Allison. The two hit together hard and Waltrip hit the front stretch wall. Waltrip began crowding Allison under the caution and got black flagged for the crowding. Parsons would win the race, but it would be his only win at the North Wilkesboro Speedway. Parsons' wife Terri, with whom he was married from 1992 until his death in 2007, became an investor in North Wilkesboro Speedway two years after his death.

=== 1980s ===
Parsons won the 1980 World 600 at Charlotte and the Los Angeles Times 500 (the final major motor race held at Ontario Motor Speedway) and finished third in points.

In 1981, Parsons started racing in the No. 15 Bud Moore Ford Thunderbird. He had wins at Nashville Speedway USA, the final race at Texas World Speedway, and Richmond. In addition, he received his final top-ten points finish, finishing tenth that year.

Parsons qualified for the 1982 Winston 500 at Talladega Superspeedway at 200.175 miles per hour (mph), which was the first NASCAR qualification run over 200 mph (322 km/h).

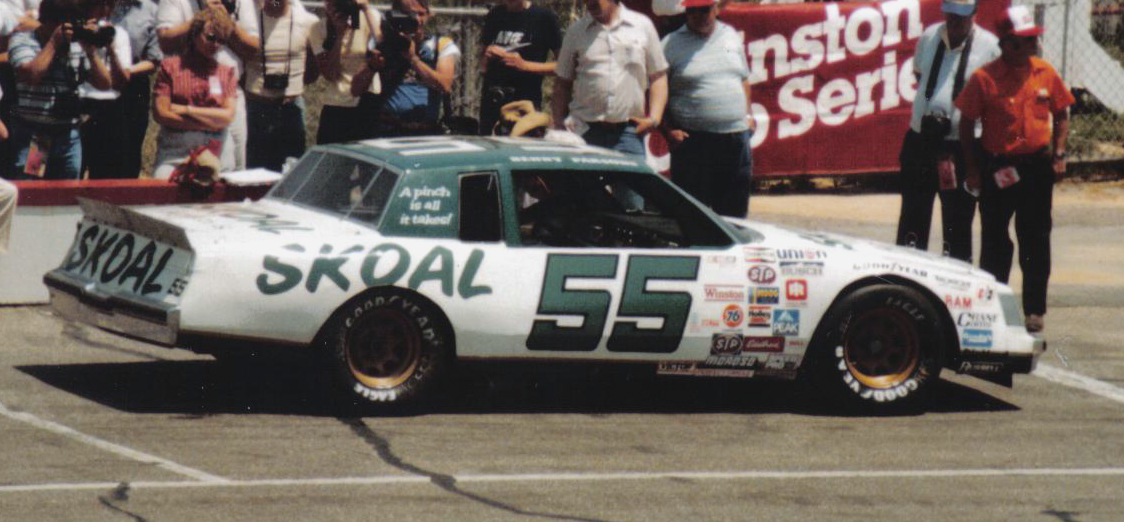
1983 racecar

Parsons raced in about half of the races between 1983 and 1986 for owner Johnny Hayes. Parsons' final career victory came in 1984 at the Coca-Cola 500 at Atlanta.

Parson appeared in the 1983 Burt Reynolds movie Stroker Ace.

Parsons joined Hendrick Motorsports in 1987 as a substitute driver for Tim Richmond, who was stricken with AIDS. During the first lap of a race at Darlington Raceway, Parsons hit the wall and badly damaged his race car. He was able to continue, but had to make several pit stops for repairs. At one point, his crew chief, Harry Hyde, refused to allow Parsons to pit because he and the crew were on an ice cream break. This incident was alluded to in the film, Days of Thunder. Another scene in the film was inspired by a real-life incident at Martinsville Speedway involving Parsons and the notoriously cantankerous Hyde. Hyde sarcastically told Parsons to hit the pace car on a restart because it was the only thing on the track that Parsons had not hit.

Parsons drove the No. 90 Bulls Eye BBQ Ford for Junie Donlavey in his final NASCAR season in 1988 and then moved to the broadcast booth, a position that he would hold until his death.

Parsons did decide to race a few other times. The first was during the 2003 Old Dominion 500 as part of an advertising segment for "Wally's World." He then drove a ceremonial victory lap at the last fall race at Rockingham in 2003 in a 1973 Chevrolet similar to the one in which he had won a championship.

Parsons is also credited with discovering former NASCAR driver Greg Biffle at a "Gong Show" held in Tucson, Arizona.

== Broadcasting career ==
Parsons began announcing as a pit reporter in the 1980s on ESPN and TBS while he was still racing part-time. After permanently retiring from racing in 1988, Parsons became a broadcaster – first on ESPN, and then with NBC and TNT in 2001. He received an ESPN Emmy in 1996, and the ACE Award in 1989. He appears in the videogames NASCAR '99, NASCAR 2000, and NASCAR 2001 as a commentator as well as an unlockable legend (he was only featured in NASCAR 2001 as an announcer). He later appeared in NASCAR Rumble as a legend in the game as well as NASCAR Thunder 2002, NASCAR Thunder 2003, and NASCAR Thunder 2004 as an unlockable driver and featured the game in NBC and TNT telecasts where Parsons did EA Sports Thunder Motion where he took viewers on a virtual ride of each track.

Parsons co-hosted coverage of Winston Cup Qualifying on North Carolina radio station WFMX with Mark Garrow in the early '90s. He continued to co-host a radio program called "Fast Talk" on Performance Racing Network (PRN) with Doug Rice until his death (he was replaced by an alternating host). He also had a podcast available on iTunes, in conjunction with CNN called The CNN Radio Racing Report with Benny Parsons.

Parsons appeared as himself in the 1995 children's video "NASCAR For Kids - A Day At The Races,” acting as the host.

In 2005, Parsons made a cameo appearance as himself in the movie Herbie: Fully Loaded. In 2006, he again appeared as himself in Talladega Nights: The Ballad of Ricky Bobby.

Parsons hosted the Golf Channel program The Big Break: NASCAR Edition, with Brian Hammons in 2005, a celebrity version of the golf program where an entire season's worth of challenges were done in one day. Dale Jarrett, Jamie McMurray, Elliott Sadler, Rusty Wallace and Michael Waltrip competed in the celebrity special.

== Personal life ==
Parsons married twice, with his first wife Connie they had two sons Kevin and Keith and married until Connie's death in June 1991. Parsons married Terri but they would not have kids together.

Kevin Parsons played golf with the Gardner-Webb Runnin' Bulldogs NCAA program, and now serves as the Vice President of Instruction at Richmond Community College, where he and his wife Kim are both instructors. Keith Parsons covered basketball for the Associated Press in the 1990's, and later had a career in finance. He currently teaches in Anson County Schools, and also serves as the head golf coach.

== Illness and death ==
Parsons began having trouble breathing in the summer of 2006. He was diagnosed with lung cancer. He announced in October 2006 that the treatment had been successful, and that he had a clean bill of health. Parsons had stopped smoking in 1978, the treatment cost Parsons the use of his left lung.

Parsons' health prevented him from attending a ceremony in November 2006 where he was to be presented with the Myers Brothers Award, honoring his contributions to racing.

On December 26, 2006, Parsons was readmitted to the hospital and placed in intensive care because of complications relating to lung cancer. Doctors would find a blood clot in his right lung.

On January 16, 2007, Parsons died of complications from lung cancer treatment in the intensive care unit of the Carolinas Medical Center in Charlotte, North Carolina. He is buried near his childhood home in Purlear, North Carolina, which is now the site of Benny Parsons' Rendezvous Ridge. Rendezvous Ridge is also his wife Terri's residence as well as being a racing museum and a winery.

== Awards and statistics ==
- Inducted into the NASCAR Hall of Fame in 2016 as part of the Class of 2017.
- Inducted into the International Motorsports Hall of Fame in 1994.
- Named as one of the NASCAR's 75 Greatest Drivers in 1998.
- Inducted into the Court of Legends at Charlotte Motor Speedway in 1994.
- Inducted into the Motorsports Hall of Fame of America in 2005.
- Had 283 top-ten finishes, led at least one lap in 192 races, and finished no lower than fifth in points between 1972 and 1980.

== Motorsports career results ==
=== NASCAR ===
(key) (Bold – Pole position awarded by qualifying time. Italics – Pole position earned by points standings or practice time. * – Most laps led.)

==== Grand National Series ====
NASCAR Grand National Series results
Year	Team	No.	Make	1	2	3	4	5	6	7	8	9	10	11	12	13	14	15	16	17	18	19	20	21	22	23	24	25	26	27	28	29	30	31	32	33	34	35	36	37	38	39	40	41	42	43	44	45	46	47	48	49	50	51	52	53	54	55	56	57	58	59	60	61	62	NGNC	Pts	Ref
1964	Holman-Moody	06	Ford	CON	AUG	JSP	SVH	RSD	DAY	DAY	DAY	RCH	BRI	GPS	BGS	ATL	AWS	HBO	PIF	CLB	NWS	MAR	SVH	DAR	LGY	HCY	SBO	CLT	GPS	ASH	ATL	CON	NSV	CHT	BIR	VAL	PIF	DAY	ODS	OBS	BRR	ISP	GLN	LIN	BRI	NSV	MBS	AWS; 21	DTS	ONA	CLB	BGS	STR	DAR	HCY	RCH	ODS	HBO	MAR	SVH	NWS	CLT	HAR	AUG	JAC	120th	130	
1969	Russ Dawson	88	Ford	MGR	MGY	RSD	DAY; 5	DAY	DAY; 7	CAR	AUG	BRI	ATL	CLB	HCY	GPS	RCH	NWS	MAR	AWS	DAR	BLV	LGY	CLT	MGR	SMR	MCH	KPT	GPS	NCF	DAY	DOV	TPN	TRN	BLV	BRI	NSV	SMR	ATL																											56th	183	
1969	Russ Dawson	18	Ford																																					MCH; 38	SBO	BGS	AWS	DAR	HCY	RCH	TAL	CLB	MAR	NWS	CLT	SVH	AUG	CAR	JFC	MGR	TWS; 3									56th	183	
1970	Benny Parsons	88	Ford	RSD	DAY	DAY; 7	DAY; 14																																																											8th	2993	
1970	DeWitt Racing	72	Ford					RCH; 15	CAR; 21	SVH; 4	ATL; 8	BRI; 27	TAL; 4	NWS; 28	CLB; 16	DAR; 5	BLV; 12	LGY; 5	CLT; 3	SMR	MAR; 38	MCH; 10	RSD; 18	HCY; 6	KPT; 13	GPS; 5	DAY; 31	AST; 25	TPN; 3	TRN; 7	BRI; 19	SMR; 13	NSV; 22	ATL; 8	CLB; 16	ONA; 23	MCH; 8	TAL; 35	BGS; 5	SBO; 4	DAR; 39	HCY; 15	RCH; 6	DOV; 5	NCF; 14	NWS; 6	CLT; 4	MAR; 9	MGR; 7	CAR; 33	**LGY**; 2															8th	2993	
1971	DeWitt Racing	72	Ford	RSD; 3	DAY	DAY; 5	DAY; 35		RCH; 3		HCY; 3	BRI; 5	ATL; 36	CLB; 2*	GPS; 5	SMR; 2	NWS; 4	MAR; 16		SBO; 1		ASH; 12	KPT; 23																										RCH; 25	NWS; 5																11th	2611	
1971	DeWitt Racing	72	Mercury					ONT; 9		CAR; 25									DAR; 23		TAL; 48			CLT; 7	DOV; 23	MCH; 28	RSD; 22	HOU	GPS	DAY	BRI	AST	ISP	TRN	NSV; 3	ATL; 3	BGS	ONA	MCH; 38	TAL; 47	CLB	HCY	DAR; 16	MAR; 6	CLT; 10	DOV; 29	CAR; 6	MGR																		11th	2611	
1971	DeWitt Racing	72	Chevy																																																TWS; 38															11th	2611	

==== Winston Cup Series ====
NASCAR Winston Cup Series results
Year	Team	No.	Make	1	2	3	4	5	6	7	8	9	10	11	12	13	14	15	16	17	18	19	20	21	22	23	24	25	26	27	28	29	30	31	NWCC	Pts	Ref
1972	DeWitt Racing	72	Ford	RSD; 40		RCH; 8		CAR; 7																											5th	6844.15	
1972	DeWitt Racing	72	Mercury		DAY; 4		ONT; 14		ATL; 7	BRI; 21	DAR; 4	NWS; 5	MAR; 20	TAL; 10	CLT; 4	DOV; 6	MCH; 25	RSD; 2	TWS; 4	DAY; 36	BRI; 4	TRN; 8	ATL; 4	TAL; 25	MCH; 7	NSV; 4	DAR; 35	RCH; 23	DOV; 34	MAR; 6	NWS; 4	CLT; 38	CAR; 35	TWS; 6	5th	6844.15	
1973	DeWitt Racing	72	Chevy	RSD; 14	DAY; 30	RCH; 10	CAR; 31		ATL; 3	NWS; 2	DAR; 2	MAR; 6	TAL; 3	NSV; 2	CLT; 5	DOV; 6	TWS; 7	RSD; 3	MCH; 9	DAY; 5	BRI; 1*	ATL; 25	TAL; 38	NSV; 19	DAR; 5	RCH; 4	DOV; 4	NWS; 5	MAR; 6	CLT; 4	CAR; 28				1st	7173.8	
1973	DeWitt Racing	72	Mercury					BRI; 5																											1st	7173.8	
1974	DeWitt Racing	72	Chevy	RSD; 4	DAY; 22	RCH; 13	CAR; 23	BRI; 3	ATL; 29	DAR; 32	NWS; 4	MAR; 4	TAL; 2	NSV; 16	DOV; 4	CLT; 31	RSD; 3	MCH; 25	DAY; 27	BRI; 17	NSV; 7	ATL; 8	POC; 5	TAL; 5	MCH; 22	DAR; 26	RCH; 2	DOV; 4	NWS; 13	MAR; 15	CLT; 27	CAR; 9			5th	1591.5	
1974	DeWitt Racing	72	Ford																														ONT; 35		5th	1591.5	
1975	DeWitt Racing	72	Chevy	RSD; 24	DAY; 1	RCH; 3	CAR; 22	BRI; 2	ATL; 28	NWS; 6	DAR; 6	**MAR**; 6	TAL; 43	NSV; 2	DOV; 23	CLT; 39	RSD; 3	MCH; 34	DAY; 8	**NSV**; 4	POC; 4	TAL; 6	MCH; 34	DAR; 20	DOV; 3	NWS; 6	MAR; 2	CLT; 4	**RCH**; 18	CAR; 24	BRI; 5	ATL; 19	ONT; 34		4th	3820	
1976	DeWitt Racing	72	Chevy	RSD; 5	DAY; 3	CAR; 5	RCH; 9	BRI; 3	ATL; 2	NWS; 4	DAR; 3	MAR; 20	TAL; 26	**NSV**; 3	DOV; 1	CLT; 5	RSD; 3	MCH; 19	DAY; 7	NSV; 1	POC; 3	TAL; 39	MCH; 9	BRI; 4	DAR; 7	**RCH**; 29	DOV; 26	MAR; 5	NWS; 2	CLT; 5	CAR; 31	ATL; 6	ONT; 3		3rd	4304	
1977	DeWitt Racing	72	Chevy	RSD; 21	DAY; 2	RCH; 3	CAR; 12	ATL; 26	NWS; 3	DAR; 5	BRI; 5	MAR; 2	TAL; 3	NSV; 1	DOV; 6	CLT; 3	RSD; 27	MCH; 3	DAY; 3	**NSV**; 18	POC; 1*	**TAL**; 24	MCH; 3	BRI; 3	DAR; 25	**RCH**; 3	DOV; 1*	MAR; 2	NWS; 5	CLT; 1*	CAR; 7	ATL; 3	ONT; 12		3rd	4570	
1978	DeWitt Racing	72	Chevy	RSD; 2		RCH; 1	CAR; 3	ATL; 13	BRI; 2*	DAR; 1	**NWS**; 3	MAR; 15		DOV; 4		NSV; 20	RSD; 1			NSV; 6	**POC**; 29				DAR; 10	RCH; 6	DOV; 26	MAR; 3	NWS; 6		CAR; 4		ONT; 8		4th	4350	
1978	DeWitt Racing	72	Olds		DAY; 3								TAL; 31		CLT; 6			MCH; 3	DAY; 26			TAL; 3	MCH; 13	BRI; 2						CLT; 28		ATL; 5			4th	4350	
1979	M.C. Anderson Racing	27	Chevy	RSD; 26		CAR; 10	RCH; 4	ATL; 5	**NWS**; 3		DAR; 4	MAR; 19		NSV; 7	DOV; 7	CLT; 5	TWS; 25	RSD; 5	MCH; 31		NSV; 4	POC; 4		MCH; 3	BRI; 4*	DAR; 5	RCH; 8	DOV; 22	MAR; 27	CLT; 6	NWS; 1	CAR; 2*	ATL; 31	ONT; 1*	5th	4256	
1979	M.C. Anderson Racing	27	Olds		DAY; 18					BRI; 5			TAL; 35							DAY; 2			TAL; 21												5th	4256	
1980	M.C. Anderson Racing	27	Chevy	RSD; 33		RCH; 28	CAR; 21	ATL; 30	BRI; 4	**DAR**; 2	NWS; 5	MAR; 2		NSV; 2	DOV; 22	CLT; 1	TWS; 23	RSD; 3	**MCH**; 1*		NSV; 3*	POC; 20		MCH; 8	BRI; 5	DAR; 4	RCH; 10	DOV; 5	NWS; 6	MAR; 4	CLT; 33	CAR; 23	ATL; 32	ONT; 1	3rd	4278	
1980	M.C. Anderson Racing	27	Olds		DAY; 5								TAL; 8							DAY; 6			TAL; 4												3rd	4278	
1981	Bud Moore Engineering	15	Ford	RSD; 16	DAY; 31	RCH; 5	CAR; 24	ATL; 5	BRI; 5	NWS; 21	DAR; 5	MAR; 23	TAL; 36	NSV; 1	DOV; 32	CLT; 37	TWS; 1	RSD; 20	MCH; 3	DAY; 39	NSV; 3	POC; 3	TAL; 13	MCH; 26	BRI; 6	DAR; 39	RCH; 1	DOV; 34	MAR; 24	NWS; 29	CLT; 38	CAR; 6	ATL; 36	RSD; 27	10th	3449	
1982	Ranier-Lundy Racing	28	Pontiac	**DAY**; 26	RCH; 3*	BRI; 9	ATL; 4	**CAR**; 3	DAR; 4	NWS; 4	MAR; 29	**TAL**; 3*	NSV; 22	DOV; 20	CLT; 39	POC; 3	RSD; 23																		18th	2892	
1982	Ellington Racing	1	Buick															MCH; 32													CAR; 34				18th	2892	
1982	Gray Racing	19	Buick																DAY; 28	NSV	POC	TAL													18th	2892	
1982	Johnny Hayes Racing	55	Buick																				MCH; 5	BRI	DAR; 8	RCH	DOV; 5	NWS	CLT; 5	MAR		ATL; 20	RSD; 7		18th	2892	
1983	Johnny Hayes Racing	55	Buick	DAY; 42	RCH	CAR	ATL; 14	DAR; 34	NWS	MAR	TAL; 2	NSV	DOV; 29	BRI	CLT; 34	RSD	POC; 5	MCH; 13																	29th	1657	
1983	Johnny Hayes Racing	55	Chevy																DAY; 26	NSV	POC; 31	TAL; 22	MCH; 13	BRI	DAR; 8	RCH	DOV	MAR	NWS	CLT; 3	CAR	ATL; 25	RSD; 2		29th	1657	
1984	Johnny Hayes Racing	55	Chevy	DAY; 29	RCH	CAR	ATL; 1*	BRI	NWS	**DAR**; 27	MAR	TAL; 5*	NSV	DOV	CLT; 42	RSD	POC; 9	MCH; 28	DAY; 5	NSV	POC; 5	TAL; Wth	MCH; 6	BRI	DAR; 9	RCH	DOV	MAR	**CLT**; 2*	NWS	CAR	ATL; 4	RSD; 5		27th	1865	
1985	Jackson Bros. Motorsports	55	Chevy	DAY; 31	RCH	CAR	ATL; 8	BRI	DAR; 32	NWS	MAR	TAL; 29	DOV	CLT; 42	RSD	POC; 6	MCH; 10	DAY; 11	POC; 6	TAL; 36	MCH; 5	BRI	DAR; 8	RCH	DOV	MAR	NWS	CLT; 41	CAR	ATL; 33	RSD				29th	1427	
1986	Jackson Bros. Motorsports	55	Olds	DAY; 5	RCH	CAR	ATL; 6	BRI	DAR; 28	NWS	MAR	TAL; 20	DOV	CLT; 34	RSD	POC; 33	MCH; 41	DAY; 36	POC; 29	TAL; 5	GLN; 8	**MCH**; 26	BRI	DAR; 31	RCH	DOV	MAR	NWS	CLT; 30	CAR	ATL; 11	RSD; 27			30th	1555	
1987	Hendrick Motorsports	35	Chevy	DAY; 2	CAR; 34	RCH; 10	ATL; 2	DAR; 21	NWS; 15	BRI; 28	MAR; 26	TAL; 12	CLT; 26	DOV; 5	POC; 33	RSD; 34	MCH; 9	DAY; 35	POC; 4	TAL; 30	GLN; 5	MCH; 18	BRI; 26	DAR; 31	RCH; 16	DOV; 16	MAR; 23	NWS; 19	CLT; 38	CAR; 15	RSD; 2	ATL; 7			16th	3215	
1988	Donlavey Racing	90	Ford	DAY; 31	RCH; 14	CAR; 33	ATL; 13	DAR; 34	BRI; 13	NWS; 17	MAR; 14	TAL; 24	CLT; 25	DOV; 22	RSD; 13	POC; 31	MCH; 38	DAY; 35	POC; 35	TAL; 27	GLN; 39	MCH; 15	BRI	DAR; 13	RCH; 20	DOV; 27	MAR; 20	CLT; 12	NWS; QL^{†}	CAR; 13	PHO; 8	ATL; 34			24th	2559	
^{†} - Qualified but replaced by Jimmy Means

===== Daytona 500 =====
Year	Team	Manufacturer	Start	Finish
1969	Russ Dawson	Ford	11	7
1970	Benny Parsons	Ford	14	14
1971	DeWitt Racing	Ford	12	35
1972	DeWitt Racing	Mercury	33	4
1973	DeWitt Racing	Chevrolet	13	30
1974	DeWitt Racing	Chevrolet	10	22
1975	DeWitt Racing	Chevrolet	32	**1**
1976	DeWitt Racing	Chevrolet	32	3
1977	DeWitt Racing	Chevrolet	6	2
1978	DeWitt Racing	Oldsmobile	8	3
1979	M.C. Anderson Racing	Oldsmobile	5	18
1980	M.C. Anderson Racing	Oldsmobile	14	5
1981	Bud Moore Engineering	Ford	4	31
1982	Ranier-Lundy Racing	Pontiac	**1**	26
1983	Johnny Hayes Racing	Buick	14	42
1984	Johnny Hayes Racing	Chevrolet	8	29
1985	Jackson Bros. Motorsports	Chevrolet	5	31
1986	Jackson Bros. Motorsports	Oldsmobile	31	5
1987	Hendrick Motorsports	Chevrolet	4	2
1988	Donlavey Racing	Ford	42	31

=== International Race of Champions ===
(key) (Bold – Pole position. * – Most laps led.)

International Race of Champions results
Year	Make	Q1	Q2	Q3	1	2	3	4	Pos.	Pts	Ref
1975–76	Chevy				MCH; 4	RSD; 5	RSD; 9	DAY; 1	3rd	NA	
1977–78	Chevy				MCH; 9	RSD; 9	RSD; 8	DAY; 5	7th	NA	
1978–79	Chevy	MCH; 6	MCH	RSD	RSD	ATL			NA	0	
1979–80	Chevy	**MCH**; 6	MCH	RSD	RSD	ATL			NA	0	
1984	Chevy				MCH; 2	CLE; 4	TAL; 5	MCH; 7	4th	47	

Sporting positions
Preceded by Richard Petty	NASCAR Winston Cup Champion; 1973	Succeeded by Richard Petty
Preceded by Iggy Katona	ARCA Champion; 1968–1969	Succeeded by Ramo Stott
Achievements
Preceded by Richard Petty	Daytona 500 Winner; 1975	Succeeded by David Pearson
