= NASCAR Road Racing =

1999 video game

- Cover art featuring the car of Mark Martin
- Developer: FarSight Studios
- Publisher: EA Sports
- Series: EA Sports NASCAR
- Platform: Microsoft Windows
- Release: NA: May 26, 1999
- Genre: Racing
- Modes: Single player, Multiplayer

NASCAR Road Racing is a computer racing simulator developed by FarSight Studios and published by EA Sports. It was released on May 26, 1999, for Microsoft Windows.

It is essentially a reskin of EA's older title Andretti Racing with the same tracks and engine. The game received generally mixed reviews from critics, facing criticism for the controls and functionality, with the graphics being considered inferior and others praising its easy-to-play and simple nature.

== Gameplay ==
Unlike the typical NASCAR video game, NASCAR Road Racing focuses on road racing rather than oval track racing as what the sport is known for. In lieu of real tracks, 12 fictional circuits are available to race on. The game has a licensed roster of 26 drivers, all of which are identical in performance.

Before races, the player can make adjustments to the car's setup such as tire type, gear ratio, fuel capacity, and modifying the spoiler. Races span between three and 24 laps with between 10 and 26 cars. Pit stops and car damage can also be toggled.

The game is compatible with a keyboard, controller, and steering wheel.

== Development ==
NASCAR Road Racing was one of three NASCAR games published by EA in late 1998 and 1999 alongside NASCAR 99 and NASCAR Revolution. Promotion of the game had what PC PowerPlay called a "discernable lack of enthusiasm" from EA as more focus was placed on its companion titles.

Visa Inc. offered cardholders a free demo if they purchased tickets to the 1999 UAW-GM Quality 500 at Lowe's Motor Speedway. The card company also gave a discount for those who bought the full game.

The soundtrack was composed by Steve Goldstein.

== Reception ==
The game was poorly received by some reviewers, with criticism aimed at the graphics and gameplay. Michael Galuschka from GameStar pointed out that NASCAR Road Racing is just a "light version" of Andretti Racing, giving it an 18% score.

In a 28 out of 100 review, PC PowerPlay derided the game as an obvious attempt to promote NASCAR 99 and NASCAR Revolution, criticizing the poor graphics, lack of 3D support, and underdeveloped soundtrack. Secret Service expressed disappointment that it was supposed to be EA's decisive title to establish itself as the top NASCAR developer, calling it a "game with great intentions and rather average execution" with more inferior graphics and a less-functional handling model than Revolution. Christian Sauerteig of PC Action likewise proclaimed, "Anyone who previously thought that the name EA Sports automatically stands for high-quality computer games is now disabused of this notion", and described NASCAR Road Racing as a "questionable attempt by the industry leader to capitalize on an outdated game concept".

Xtreme PC commended the large roster of tracks and their design; otherwise, the magazine was critical of the poor artificial intelligence and how the closest thing to a difficulty setting was changing the player car's damage level. While a negative review, Xtreme PC felt that the game could have succeeded with an updated game engine.

A more positive review came from SuperGamePower, writing that it appealed to non-NASCAR fans because it lacked the technical jargon and nuances of a simulation game.

StarTech.com's Nathan DeBacker praised the game's controls, commenting on how "the ability to pick up and easily play is by far one of [its] best attributes". However, he disliked the lack of a season mode and felt dedicated NASCAR fans might not enjoy its arcade nature. Bryan Crowson of The Birmingham News called it "fun to drive" but found a myriad of issues when playing with a Microsoft SideWinder controller.

== See also ==
- NASCAR SimRacing, a later Windows-only NASCAR game by EA
