= NASCAR 08 =

2007 video game

- North American PS2 cover art featuring Tony Stewart
- Developers: EA Tiburon; Exient Entertainment (PS2)
- Publisher: EA Sports
- Series: EA Sports NASCAR
- Engine: EAGL 4
- Platforms: PlayStation 2 PlayStation 3 Xbox 360
- Release: July 23, 2007: PlayStation 2; NA: July 23, 2007; AU: August 23, 2007; EU: August 24, 2007; PlayStation 3; NA: July 23, 2007; AU: September 20, 2007; EU: September 21, 2007; Xbox 360; NA: July 23, 2007; EU: November 9, 2007; AU: November 15, 2007
- Genre: Racing
- Modes: Single-player, multiplayer

NASCAR 08 is the eleventh installment of the EA Sports NASCAR series. It was developed by EA Tiburon for PlayStation 3 and Xbox 360 and by Exient Entertainment for PlayStation 2. This was the earliest that EA has released a NASCAR game at the time, until NASCAR 09, which featured a June release. It also marks the first time the original Xbox has been excluded from the NASCAR lineup since NASCAR 2001.

Tony Stewart is on the cover marking his third appearance on the cover of an EA Sports NASCAR game since NASCAR Thunder 2004. The cover in the PAL region features Juan Pablo Montoya (as Montoya returns to EA Sports cover athlete since F1 Career Challenge). NASCAR's new Car of Tomorrow as well as the current car are present in the game, although the Car of Tomorrow is generic (no separate manufacturers). ESPN's NASCAR coverage is also integrated into the game.

Reception

Aggregate score
Aggregator	Score
Metacritic	(PS2) 56/100 (PS3) 57/100 (X360) 59/100

Review scores
Publication	Score
GameRevolution	2.5/10
GameSpot	6/10 (PS2) 6/10
GameSpy	2.5/5
GamesRadar+	3/5
GameZone	7/10
IGN	5/10 (PS2) 5.5/10

== Reception ==
Critical reception of the PlayStation 3 and Xbox 360 version of the game has been mixed. Play Magazine gave the game 38%. GameSpot gave the Xbox 360 version a 6.0 rating and a 6.0 for the PlayStation 3 version. IGN called NASCAR 08 "bare-bones, unpolished and uninspired", saying that the package felt insubstantial with the lack of basic inclusions such as ending wrap-up screens for the Season mode.

Critical reception of the PlayStation 2 version was better when compared to the previous year's NASCAR 07, but was still mixed. Strategy Informer reviewed the title, stating that the game improved in insubstantial ways over the previous entry through appealing to a broader audience in favor of the core fans invested in its mechanics.
