= NASCAR 07 =

2006 video game

- North American PlayStation 2 cover art featuring Elliott Sadler
- Developers: EA Tiburon; Exient Entertainment (PSP)
- Publisher: EA Sports
- Series: EA Sports NASCAR
- Engine: EAGL 3
- Platforms: PlayStation 2, PlayStation Portable, Xbox, mobile phone
- Release: NA: September 8, 2006; EU: October 6, 2006 (exc. Xbox); Mobile phone: NA: February 5, 2007
- Genre: Racing
- Modes: Single-player, multiplayer

NASCAR 07 is the tenth installment of the EA Sports' NASCAR video game series. It was developed by EA Tiburon for PlayStation 2 and Xbox, and by Exient Entertainment for PlayStation Portable. This was the last NASCAR edition to be released exclusively on sixth generation consoles.

The NTSC game cover features Elliott Sadler, driver of the #38 M&M's Ford Fusion. The PAL region game cover features Matt Kenseth's #17 DeWalt Power Tools Ford Fusion. This game is the first since NASCAR 2001 not to include a subtitle in the name. The game retains the teammate features introduced in NASCAR 06: Total Team Control, but does not add any major gameplay changes. However, the graphics include a blurring effect to attempt to give a better sense of high speed, and the pace of the gameplay has been sped up considerably. This is also the second EA Sports NASCAR video game to appear on a handheld system (first NASCAR 2000 for Game Boy Color). On the PlayStation Portable, the game is simply called NASCAR. This was also the only NASCAR game on the PlayStation Portable, and the last NASCAR game on the Xbox.

== Gameplay ==
NASCAR 07 career mode features the game modes Race Now, Fight to the Top, Season, Dodge Challenges, and Chase for the Cup. The game also supported online play for up to 4 players in one race.

== New features ==
The game introduces Dynamic Driver Attributes and a Variable Driver Attribute System. By making certain moves while racing the player gains skill points and fills an adrenaline meter which can increase driver attributes, but other moves can decrease skill points and adrenaline. The game also introduced a RaceBreaker feature which allows players to see the holes in the track to help make their way through the pack.

== Reception ==
Reception

Aggregate scores
Aggregator	Score
GameRankings	(PS2) 70% (XBOX) 71% (PSP) 69%
Metacritic	(PS2) 68/100 (XBOX) 72/100 (PSP) 66/100

Review scores
Publication	Score
GameSpot	7/10 (PSP) 7.5/10
GameSpy	3.5/5
GamesRadar+	3.5/5
GameZone	7.3/10 (PSP) 7.5/10
IGN	7.5/10 (PSP) 6.8/10

NASCAR 07 received a mixed response from critics upon release. Metacritic, which assigns a normalized ratings in the 0–100 range, calculated an average score of 72 out of 100, indicating "mixed or average reviews", based on 26 reviews for the Xbox version, 68 out of 100 based on 26 reviews for the PlayStation 2 version, and 66 out of 100 based on 13 reviews for the PSP version. GameRankings assigned it an average score of 71% based on 23 reviews for the Xbox version, 70% based on 23 reviews for the PlayStation 2 version, and 69% based on 13 reviews for the PSP version.
