= NASCAR 09 =

2008 racing video game

- North American Xbox 360 cover art featuring Jeff Gordon
- Developer: EA Tiburon (Note: PlayStation 2 port developed by EA North Carolina.)
- Publisher: EA Sports (Note: Mobile version developed and published by EA Mobile.)
- Series: EA Sports NASCAR
- Engine: EAGL 4
- Platforms: PlayStation 2, PlayStation 3, Xbox 360, mobile phone
- Release: June 10, 2008: NA: June 10, 2008; EU: June 13, 2008; AU: June 26, 2008; EU: June 27, 2008 (PS3); Mobile phone; NA: September 25, 2008
- Genre: Racing
- Modes: Single-player, multiplayer

NASCAR 09 is a 2008 sim racing video game, the twelfth simulation installment in the EA Sports NASCAR series, and the sequel to 2007 game NASCAR 08. It is developed by EA Tiburon and released on the PlayStation 2, PlayStation 3, and Xbox 360 in June 2008, and for mobile phones in September of the same year. Jeff Gordon is the cover athlete for NASCAR 09 for the first time since NASCAR 06: Total Team Control. Through the career mode, "Chase for the NASCAR Sprint Cup", Gordon leads a mentoring program, a new feature offered in NASCAR 09.

This is the last official NASCAR game released by EA Sports for the original platforms before their exclusive license with NASCAR expired. In 2009, NASCAR Kart Racing was released, replacing any 2009 installment for the annual series. It was EA's last game before their exclusive license with NASCAR expired.

== Features ==
Jeff Gordon mentors the player in the new "Chase for the NASCAR Sprint Cup" career mode that has a completely revamped 3D menu interface. With Jeff's help, the player signs contracts, builds their reputation, and earns performance points by winning in the NASCAR Whelen Modified Tour (PS2 only), the NASCAR Craftsman Truck Series, the NASCAR Nationwide Series, and the NASCAR Sprint Cup Series. One new feature in NASCAR 09 is "Own The Track". This allows the player to compete against friends or other gamers and own all 22 tracks in the Sprint Cup Series. Also new is the new "Sprint Driver Challenge", in which the player complete challenges in all sorts of situations to earn rep and performance points. In the game there are two driving styles available for the player to choose from: Normal and Pro. The Pro driving style is more suited for experienced players, while the Normal mode is better suited for beginners. The game also allows the driver to build his own car from the ground up. Over one million setup combinations are available to make the car handle better and run faster.

Also new to NASCAR 09 was the Paint Booth Customization Feature, similar to Papyrus' NASCAR games. For only the second time in the franchise's history (first appearing in EA's NASCAR Sim Racing for PC), a car customization template was available online which created endless possibilities for personalization. Players were only able to see their friends' custom-designed car skins when racing against them online, not non-friends. The online connectivity of Paint Booth allowed players to download a car template from the EA Sports website and import it into editing programs, such as Adobe Photoshop, giving users a multitude of design options. They could then upload those images into the game and show off their dream machine on the track. After EA lost the NASCAR license, the Paint Booth application was removed from the EA Sports website.

== Development and release ==
Electronic Arts moved the PlayStation 3 and Xbox 360 game development to a new studio in North Carolina to be able to get better information with the NASCAR teams in an attempt to improve the game. The PlayStation 2 version of the game were still made at the old studio. Due to the development team using certain resources to work on key features in the game, no car manufacturers were present in this year's title. The game was released in North America on June 10, 2008. In the United Kingdom, it was released for PlayStation 2 and Xbox 360 on June 13, and for PlayStation 3 on June 27. The game shipped in Australia on June 26. A version for mobile phones by EA Mobile was made available on September 25, 2008.

Best Buy released the game with a special edition cover featuring Elliott Sadler, who received sponsorship from Best Buy. Sadler previously appeared on the cover of NASCAR 07.

Downloadable content was added in July 2008; among the content was the Circuit Gilles Villeneuve road course for the Nationwide Series and new car paint schemes for the Sprint Cup and Nationwide. Also, there were three downloadable paint scheme packs that featured special paint schemes for cars already in the game. They are just like the other cars in the game with no manufacturers.

== Reception ==
Reception

Aggregate score
Aggregator	Score
Metacritic	(PS3) 65/100 (X360) 69/100

Review scores
Publication	Score
Eurogamer	6/10
GameSpot	7/10
GameSpy	3/5
GamesRadar+	4/5
GameZone	7.9/10
IGN	5.9/10 (PS2) 5/10
VideoGamer.com	6/10

NASCAR 09 received "mixed or average" reviews, according to review aggregator Metacritic.

IGN gave the PlayStation 3 version a score of 5.9/10 and the PlayStation 2 version a score of 5/10. The reviewer noted that the overall presentation was lacking excluding Jeff Gordon's green screen mentoring in the game. He was also generally disappointed with the gameplay, saying, "The controls are decent, and the Sprint Driver Challenges are quite fun. But the racing itself is a tepid, repetitive experience with no flair." They also noted that the PlayStation 3 version suffered from texture rips, clipping and slowdown while the Xbox 360 version had a smoother framerate.

X-Play gave the game a positive review, giving it a 4/5, praising the graphics, racing, and career mode, but noted that it has a clumsy interface and that EA's online policies needed a lot of work. In their video review they said the A.I. is "fairly fair, nothing crazy, just alright".

== Legacy and series future ==
This was the final simulation installment of the EA Sports NASCAR series. Electronic Arts has stated they would not make another title due to slumping sales, lack of popularity, and the difficulty of installing any new features. NASCAR Kart Racing was the only NASCAR-themed game produced by EA for the 2009 season. EA's exclusive license as NASCAR's official video game producer expired in 2010. In September 2010, Activision was announced as the distributor for a NASCAR game, to be developed by Eutechnyx, with direct involvement from NASCAR. The first game, NASCAR The Game: 2011, was released on March 29, 2011 for PlayStation 3 and Xbox 360. The EA servers for NASCAR 09 and numerous other EA games were permanently shut down on August 11, 2011.

The license to NASCAR games would later be acquired by 704Games as a NASCAR Heat series revival. Monster Games, in collaboration with Dusenberry Martin Racing, released the first game titled NASCAR Heat Evolution in 2016.

== Soundtrack ==
Artist	Song
AFI	"Ether"
Airbourne	"Runnin' Wild"
Airbourne	"Too Much, Too Young, Too Fast"
Christian Kane	"The House Rules"
The Parks	"Born Into It"
From First to Last	"Two As One"
Jet Black Stare	"It's Over"
Jet Black Stare	"Ready to Roll"
Keith Anderson	"C'MON!"
The Parlor Mob	"Hard Times"
P.O.D	"Condescending"
Rev Theory	"Light It Up"
The Black Keys	"Strange Times"
Theory of a Deadman	"Got It Made"
Third Day	"This Is Who I Am"
