= EA Sports NASCAR =

Series of NASCAR games

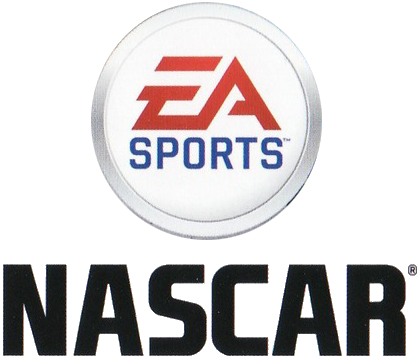
- Logo used from 2005 to 2009
- Genres: NASCAR, Auto racing, Sim racing
- Developers: EA Sports, EA Tiburon, EA Mobile
- Publishers: Electronic Arts, EA Sports
- Platforms: PlayStation, Saturn, Nintendo 64, Game Boy Color, PlayStation 2, Xbox, GameCube, PlayStation 3, Xbox 360, Wii, Windows, J2ME
- First release: NASCAR 98; September 24, 1997
- Latest release: NASCAR Kart Racing; February 10, 2009

EA Sports NASCAR, alternately known as NASCAR Thunder, was a series of NASCAR video games published by EA Sports. The series began with NASCAR 98 and NASCAR 99 in 1997 and 1998. EA Sports released NASCAR Thunder 2002 in 2001, and ever since then, Jeff Gordon (2002), Dale Earnhardt Jr. (2003), and Tony Stewart (2004) were on the cover. In 2004, they changed the name of the game to NASCAR 2005: Chase for the Cup and added the new features to make the game more up-to-date with the recent changes to NASCAR. Kevin Harvick was on the cover.

The next year, they changed the name yet again to NASCAR 06: Total Team Control. Jeff Gordon and Hendrick Motorsports teammate Jimmie Johnson were on the cover. The new features were swapping cars with teammates and voice-recognition support for use with the crew chief. The following year, the game was titled NASCAR 07 and features Elliott Sadler on the cover. The new features include a new speed blur effect and an all-new momentum system, used to describe drivers' strong and weak racetrack types. In 2004, the feature was a "Grudges and Alliances" feature in which if the player hits a car, they could retaliate. The feature received a mixed reaction.

After NASCAR Kart Racing was released in 2009, EA discontinued the series due to budget cuts and the expiration of EA Sports' contract with NASCAR. Polyphony Digital has since bought the rights to develop official NASCAR cars and tracks in their simulation video game Gran Turismo 5, marking the end of the series under the EA Sports label.

Eutechnyx later acquired the license, starting the NASCAR The Game series with NASCAR The Game: 2011.

== Games ==
| Game | Season | Platform(s) |
|---|---|---|
| NASCAR 98 | 1997 | PlayStation, Sega Saturn |
| NASCAR 99 | 1998 | PlayStation, Nintendo 64 |
| NASCAR Revolution | 1999 | Windows |
| NASCAR Road Racing | 1999 | Windows |
| NASCAR 2000 | 1999 | PlayStation, Nintendo 64, Game Boy Color, Windows |
| NASCAR Rumble | 2000 | PlayStation |
| NASCAR 2001 | 2000 | PlayStation, PlayStation 2 |
| NASCAR Thunder 2002 | 2001 | PlayStation, PlayStation 2, Xbox |
| NASCAR Thunder 2003 | 2002 | PlayStation, PlayStation 2, Xbox, GameCube, Windows |
| NASCAR Thunder 2004 | 2003 | PlayStation, PlayStation 2, Xbox, Windows |
| NASCAR 2005: Chase for the Cup | 2004 | PlayStation 2, Xbox, GameCube |
| NASCAR SimRacing | 2005 | Windows |
| NASCAR 06: Total Team Control | 2005 | PlayStation 2, Xbox |
| NASCAR 07 | 2006 | PlayStation 2, PlayStation Portable, Xbox, J2ME |
| EA Sports NASCAR Racing | 2007 | Arcade |
| NASCAR 08 | 2007 | PlayStation 2, PlayStation 3, Xbox 360 |
| NASCAR 09 | 2008 | PlayStation 2, PlayStation 3, Xbox 360, J2ME |
| NASCAR Kart Racing | 2009 | Wii |

== See also ==
- F1
- List of NASCAR video games
- NASCAR 09 Page on EA Mobile site
