= NASCAR: Dirt to Daytona =

2002 video game

- PlayStation 2 cover art
- Developer: Monster Games
- Publisher: Infogrames
- Platforms: PlayStation 2, GameCube
- Release: NA: November 12, 2002
- Genre: Sim racing
- Modes: Single-player, multiplayer

NASCAR: Dirt to Daytona is a racing simulator developed by Monster Games and published by Infogrames in November 2002 for the PlayStation 2 and GameCube. It features NASCAR's Dodge Weekly Racing Series (the only game to feature this series), Featherlite Modified Tour, Craftsman Truck Series, and the NASCAR Winston Cup Series (originally, Winston was the title sponsor but due to ESRB rating of E for Everyone, all tobacco and alcohol related brands were censored, and in the case of Mark Martin, his No. 6 Viagra car was changed to the maker of the drug Pfizer based on the men's health variation of the scheme but without the men's health). The Dodge Weekly Racing Series (dirt street stock division) and Featherlite Modified Tour rosters consist of generic fantasy drivers. The Craftsman Truck Series also features fantasy drivers alongside real ones. The unique feature of having to work your way up through the ranks from the low tier Weekly Racing Series to the Cup Series would later return in EA Sports' NASCAR 2005: Chase for the Cup.

Strangely, pit stops and yellow flags are absent in the Featherlite Modified Tour, despite both being included in real life.

== Reception ==
Reception

Aggregate score
Aggregator	Score	
Aggregator	GameCube	PS2
Metacritic	85/100	84/100

Review scores
Publication	Score	
Publication	GameCube	PS2
Electronic Gaming Monthly	N/A	7.5/10
Game Informer	N/A	8.75/10
GameSpot	8.1/10	8.1/10
GameSpy	4/5	N/A
IGN	8.3/10	8.3/10
Nintendo Power	3.2/5	N/A
Nintendo World Report	8/10	N/A
Official U.S. PlayStation Magazine	N/A	3.5/5
X-Play	N/A	4/5

The game received "favorable" reviews on both platforms according to the review aggregation website Metacritic. Air Hendrix of GamePro said, "With its glittering graphics and glamorous licenses, NASCAR Thunder delivers the best NASCAR experience, rich in cameos by famous drivers and the like. But compared to D2D [sic], Thunder's cars don't handle as smoothly and its Career mode is heavy on complexity and short on fun. For the best in NASCAR racing, Dirt to Daytona will take you all the way to victory lane." (Note: GamePro gave the game as a whole two 3.5/5 scores for graphics and sound, and two 5/5 scores for control and fun factor.)

The GameCube version won the award for "Best Driving Game on GameCube" at GameSpot's Best and Worst of 2002 Awards. In the same way, the PlayStation 2 version was nominated for the "Best Driving Game on PlayStation 2" award, which went to Burnout 2: Point of Impact.
