= EA Sports NASCAR Racing =

2007 video game

EA Sports Nascar Team Racing
- Promotional flyer used in 2007
- Developer: EA Tiburon
- Publisher: Global VR
- Series: EA Sports NASCAR
- Platform: Arcade
- Release: NA: 2007
- Genre: Racing game
- Modes: Single-player, multiplayer

EA Sports NASCAR Team Racing is an arcade racing game developed by EA Tiburon and released by Global VR. It is part of the EA Sports NASCAR series. The game was released on Friday August 3, 2007 at the AAMA Gala. Up to four racers (10 with the version 1.1 update) race against each other and the CPU in one of the major NASCAR tracks (i.e. Daytona International Speedway, Indianapolis Motor Speedway, etc.). Damage is visible but does not affect performance (until one crashes), and AI will frequently wreck. At the end of each race the racer receives a halo if they did not try to ram other racers and a pair of red horns if they did. The cabinet for the game supports motion feedback (but makes turning harder). The game features a selection of songs from the soundtrack of NASCAR 2005: Chase for the Cup.

This game is available in 3 cabinet versions a standard-32" LCD, deluxe-42" LCD, and motion platform-57" LCD cabinets.

== Software updates ==
Global VR has made version 1.1 of the NASCAR Racing Software available in October 2007. This update allows up to 10 cabinets to be linked together as opposed to four with the 1.0 version of the software. This feature makes the game more like the Daytona USA arcade game.

In early 2009 the version 1.5 track and team update was launched. Changes include the addition of Atlanta Motor Speedway and Watkins Glen International, updated teams and drivers and car sponsors as well as NASCAR's "Car of Tomorrow", and removes the songs from NASCAR 2005 in favor of a generic, non-licensed soundtrack.

== NASCAR Team Racing ==
In 2010, Global VR released a sequel to EA Sports NASCAR Racing called NASCAR Team Racing. In Team Racing, the driver rosters have been updated, but drivers like Jeff Gordon and Jimmie Johnson were excluded from the game. Team Racing also featured the introduction of Texas Motor Speedway and Michigan International Speedway, as well as the fantasy track Crag Canyon.
