= NASCAR 99 =

1998 video game by EA Sports

NASCAR '99
- North American PlayStation cover art featuring the cars of Dale Earnhardt, Mark Martin, Terry Labonte, and Kyle Petty
- Developer: Stormfront Studios
- Publisher: EA Sports
- Series: EA Sports NASCAR
- Platforms: Nintendo 64, PlayStation
- Release: Nintendo 64: NA: September 10, 1998; EU: November 1998; PlayStation: NA: September 22, 1998; EU: October 23, 1998
- Genre: Racing
- Modes: Single Player, Multiplayer

NASCAR '99 is a racing simulator video game developed by Stormfront Studios and published by EA Sports. It was released for Nintendo 64 on September 10, 1998, and for the PlayStation on September 22. NASCAR '99 was the second game in the EA Sports NASCAR series of video games.

== Features ==
NASCAR '99 is the second game relating in EA Sports NASCAR series of video games. The game features thirty-one of the drivers from the 1998 Winston Cup Series season and six legendary drivers. The game also includes seventeen different NASCAR race tracks, including Atlanta Motor Speedway, Sears Point, and Michigan International Speedway. Furthermore, the game includes instructions from a crew chief, such as when to make a pit stop or when cars are around the player.

== Development ==
EA confirmed the game's existence in April 1998.

== Reception ==
Reception

Aggregate score
Aggregator	Score	
Aggregator	N64	PS
GameRankings	66%	70%

Review scores
Publication	Score	
Publication	N64	PS
CNET Gamecenter	7/10	8/10
Electronic Gaming Monthly	6.875/10 (Note: In Electronic Gaming Monthly's review of the Nintendo 64 version, one critic gave it 8.5/10, another gave it 5/10, and the rest gave it each a score of 7/10.)	5.875/10 (Note: In Electronic Gaming Monthly's review of the PlayStation version, one critic gave it 7/10, two others gave it each a score of 5/10, and another gave it 6.5/10.)
EP Daily	4/10	5.5/10
Game Informer	7.25/10	8.25/10
GameRevolution	C	C
GameSpot	6.9/10	6.3/10
IGN	7/10	7.1/10
N64 Magazine	59%	N/A
Next Generation	N/A	4/5
Nintendo Power	7.4/10	N/A
Official U.S. PlayStation Magazine	N/A	4/5

The game received average reviews on both platforms according to the review aggregation website GameRankings. The game was praised for its authenticity, although critics felt that the graphics and sound effects were not improved from the previous game, NASCAR '98. Also, critics stated that the player would become "tired" of the game if they were a "racing-game fan". Next Generation said of the PlayStation version, "While not a huge improvement over NASCAR 98, it is a better game, and makes it a worthy upgrade if only for the Dual Shock [sic] support." Air Hendrix of GamePro said in the October 1998 issue that the Nintendo 64 version "redlines the thrills with quality stock-car action. Rookies will delight in the wild, bumper-grinding arcade side, while pros who dig sim racing will face off against tough CPU cars that block passing lanes and take you into the wall." (Note: GamePro gave the Nintendo 64 version all 4/5 scores for graphics, sound, control and fun factor.) An issue later, Hendrix stated, "If you're choosing between the PlayStation and N64 versions, the PlayStation game easily takes the pole – though not by a huge margin. All told, race fans in general and NASCAR fans in particular won't go wrong peeling out of pit row with this title." (Note: GamePro gave the PlayStation version three 4.5/5 scores for graphics, control, and fun factor, and 4/5 for sound.)

In their first month of release, the Nintendo 64 and PlayStation versions were respectively the sixteenth and nineteenth best-selling home console video games in the United States.
