= NASCAR Kart Racing =

2009 kart racing video game

- Developer: EA Tiburon North Carolina
- Publisher: EA Sports Freestyle
- Series: EA Sports NASCAR
- Platform: Wii
- Release: NA: February 10, 2009
- Genre: Racing
- Modes: Single-player, multiplayer

NASCAR Kart Racing is a kart racing video game that was released for the Wii console on February 10, 2009. The game features fourteen real NASCAR drivers and ten fictional drivers. The cover drivers are, from left to right, Carl Edwards, Kyle Busch, Dale Earnhardt Jr., Jeff Gordon, Tony Stewart, and Jimmie Johnson. Other drivers featured in the game are Jeff Burton, Denny Hamlin, Kasey Kahne, Kevin Harvick, Elliott Sadler, and Matt Kenseth. Joey Logano and Richard Petty are unlockable drivers in the game, either by winning an amount of trophies or discovering their cheat code. The fictional drivers in the game are Maurice L'eclair, Monica Torres, Kelly Kates, Linda Leadbetter, Shakes McDaniel, Thriller Tadwell, Billy Backfire, Bobby Backfire, Luke Trigger, and Terri Winsome.

This would be EA's only NASCAR title produced for 2009 and last game in the EA Sports NASCAR series. Due to low sales numbers for NASCAR 09 and other factors such as a difficulty making new features, the production of the annual simulation-style NASCAR games stopped until Eutechnyx's release of NASCAR The Game: 2011. EA's license as NASCAR's official video game producer expired upon the release of Gran Turismo 5.

This game marks the first NASCAR video game released on a Nintendo console since NASCAR 2005: Chase for the Cup. The game was also the last of only three games to use the EA Sports Freestyle label alongside FaceBreaker and 3 on 3 NHL Arcade.

== Racetracks ==
There are twelve different racetracks, four of which are real venues. All real venues except Talladega Superspeedway include not only a part of the real track, but a fictional, off-road section. At Daytona International Speedway and Bristol Motor Speedway, the finish line is located on the off-road section. At Dover International Speedway, the finish line is located on the real track, but is located just after the crossover from the off-road section. The fantasy tracks are Beltway Battle, Cactus Pass, Junkyard, Race Oil Harbor, Dinosaur Canyon, Red Clay Run, Riverside, and Patriot Park.

== Reception ==
Reception

Aggregate score
Aggregator	Score
Metacritic	70/100

Review scores
Publication	Score
Game Informer	6.75/10
GameZone	7.3/10
IGN	7.4/10
Nintendo Life	7/10
Nintendo Power	60%

NASCAR Kart Racing received "mixed or average" reviews, according to review aggregator Metacritic.

IGN and Nintendo Life found the game fun and praised its controls, aesthetics, creativity, handling, and multiplayer, but took minor issue with the lack of online support, ghost racers in time trials, and mildly lackluster graphics for the hardware.
