= NASCAR 2000 =

1999 video game by EA Sports

- North American PlayStation cover art featuring the cars of Dale Earnhardt, Terry Labonte, and Mark Martin
- Developers: Stormfront Studios; Software Creations (GBC)
- Publisher: EA Sports
- Series: EA Sports NASCAR
- Platforms: Nintendo 64, PlayStation, Microsoft Windows, Game Boy Color
- Release: Nintendo 64: NA: September 13, 1999; PlayStation: EU: September 24, 1999; NA: September 27, 1999; Windows: NA: March 23, 2000; Game Boy Color: NA: July 24, 2000; EU: August 18, 2000
- Genre: Racing
- Modes: Single-player, multiplayer

NASCAR 2000 is a racing simulator video game developed by Stormfront Studios and published by EA Sports.

== Publication history ==
The game was released in 1999 for Nintendo 64 and PlayStation and in 2000 for Microsoft Windows and Game Boy Color. The game is based on the 1999 NASCAR Winston Cup Series, with Adam Petty's 1999 Busch Series car and several legends such as Richard Petty and Alan Kulwicki also included. The game, along with NASCAR 98, is regarded as one of the best of EA Sports NASCAR series of video games. It was the last game for PC until NASCAR Thunder 2003. This game was the fourth title of the series.

The Windows version of the game includes manufacturer branding on the cars.

The soundtrack to the game features instrumental versions of songs from the Blues Traveler album Save His Soul.

== Reception ==
Reception

Aggregate score
Aggregator	Score			
Aggregator	GBC	N64	PC	PS
GameRankings	59%	58%	70%	72%

Review scores
Publication	Score			
Publication	GBC	N64	PC	PS
AllGame	3/5	3.5/5	3/5	3.5/5
CNET Gamecenter	8/10	N/A	7/10	7/10
Computer Games Strategy Plus	N/A	N/A	3/5	N/A
Computer Gaming World	N/A	N/A	3.5/5	N/A
Electronic Gaming Monthly	N/A	N/A	N/A	8/10
Game Informer	N/A	N/A	N/A	7/10
GameFan	N/A	42%	N/A	78% (Note: In GameFan's viewpoint of the PlayStation version, one critic gave it a score of 68, and the other 87.)
GameSpot	7.6/10	7.4/10	7/10	7.5/10
GameSpy	N/A	N/A	85%	N/A
IGN	7/10	6.5/10	7.2/10	7/10
Next Generation	N/A	N/A	N/A	2/5
Nintendo Power	5.5/10	6.8/10	N/A	N/A
Official U.S. PlayStation Magazine	N/A	N/A	N/A	4/5
PC Gamer (US)	N/A	N/A	70%	N/A

Doug Trueman of NextGen said that the PlayStation version "would have been a terrific title several years ago, but now it looks and sounds incredibly dated."

Michael Lafferty of GameZone gave the PC version nine out of ten, calling it "an adrenaline rush." However, Ash of GamePro said that the Nintendo 64 version "has a lot going for it, but it just couldn't close out the race." (Note: GamePro gave the Nintendo 64 version three 3/5 scores for graphics, sound, and overall fun factor, and 3.5/5 for control.)
