= NASCAR Revolution =

1999 video game

- Cover art featuring the cars of Dale Earnhardt, Mark Martin, and Kyle Petty
- Developer: Stormfront Studios
- Publisher: EA Sports/Electronic Arts
- Series: EA Sports NASCAR
- Platform: Microsoft Windows
- Release: NA: February 16, 1999; NASCAR Revolution SE: NA: October 1999
- Genre: Racing
- Modes: Single player, Multiplayer

NASCAR Revolution, stylized as NASCAR revolution, is a racing video game developed by Stormfront Studios and published by EA Sports (a division of Electronic Arts). It is part of the EA Sports NASCAR Racing Game series, being the third title in the game series. The game was released in 1999 for Microsoft Windows 95 and Windows 98, unlike previous games in the franchise that were console exclusives. It features race car drivers from the 1998 NASCAR Cup Series season (in the original release) or the 1999 season (in NASCAR Revolution SE), such as Kyle Petty and Dale Earnhardt.

== Reception ==
Reception

Aggregate score
Aggregator	Score
GameRankings	56%

Review scores
Publication	Score
CNET Gamecenter	4/10
Computer Games Strategy Plus	2/5
Computer Gaming World	1.5/5
GamePro	4/5
GameRevolution	C
GameSpot	4.1/10
GameSpy	(SE) 71%
IGN	4.5/10
PC Accelerator	2/10
PC Gamer (US)	34%

The game received mixed to negative reviews according to the review aggregation website GameRankings.

It was a finalist for the "PC Sports Game of the Year" award at the AIAS' 2nd Annual Interactive Achievement Awards, which was ultimately given to FIFA 99.
