= NASCAR 06: Total Team Control =

2005 video game

- North American game cover art featuring Jimmie Johnson and Jeff Gordon
- Developer: EA Tiburon
- Publisher: EA Sports
- Series: EA Sports NASCAR Series
- Engine: EAGL 3
- Platforms: PlayStation 2 Xbox
- Release: NA: August 30, 2005; PAL: October 21, 2005
- Genre: Racing
- Modes: Single-player, multiplayer

NASCAR 06: Total Team Control is the ninth installment of the EA Sports' NASCAR video game series. It was developed by EA Tiburon and released on August 30, 2005, for the PlayStation 2 and Xbox. The NTSC game cover features Hendrick Motorsports teammates Jeff Gordon, driver of the No. 24 DuPont Automotive Finishes Chevy Monte Carlo and Jimmie Johnson, driver of the No. 48 Lowe's Home Improvement Chevy Monte Carlo. The PAL region game cover features 2004 NASCAR Nextel Cup Series champion Kurt Busch in the No. 97 Irwin Industrial Tools Ford Taurus.

== Gameplay ==
NASCAR 06 follows the series' recent tradition of being subtitled with the major new feature of that edition. Total Team Control derives from the new teammate features: one can switch control from their driver to another car on their team during a race, and can command the teammate to follow, block for or work with the player. It also implements Logitech USB audio technology, allowing the player to order their crew chief with a headset or microphone. The rest of the game retains the modes and features brought into the series by NASCAR 2005: Chase for the Cup, making NASCAR 06 very similar to its predecessor. The game begins with the Pepsi 400, where Jimmie Johnson gets wrecked after bumping Hendrick Motorsports teammate Jeff Gordon ahead of Dale Earnhardt Jr. and the player must take control of Gordon and win the race.

NASCAR 06 includes online multiplayer. The online servers for NASCAR 06 shut down on September 1, 2007

== Dodge Challenges ==
The Dodge Challenges, formerly the Lightning Challenge of the previous three games, return with a new set of challenges. This mode allows users to relive NASCAR moments of 2004 and first part of 2005. Kenny Wallace, driver of the No. 22 Stacker 2 Ford in the Busch Series and the No. 00 Aaron's Dream Machine Chevrolet in the Cup Series, is the commentator for all the challenges, replacing Michael Waltrip who had done it the last two games. Once a challenge is completed, the player will receive skill points that they can use to unlock Chase Plates, formerly Thunder Plates of the previous games as well, ranging from simple tasks such as holding off other drivers for the win, to hard tasks such as helping teammates reach the top ten.

== Reception ==
Reception

Aggregate score
Aggregator	Score
Metacritic	(PS2) 78/100 (XBOX) 79/100

Review scores
Publication	Score
1Up.com	6.5/10
GameSpot	8.4/10
GameSpy	4/5
GameZone	8.7/10
IGN	8.5/10

The game received positive ratings from many reviewers who praised the new teamplay features, adding to an already abundant amount of content. It is likewise criticized by fans and reviewers for subpar graphics, unrealistic damage, and not making the strides to the series NASCAR 2005: Chase for the Cup did; John Davidson, a reviewer on 1UP, called the features "gratuitous" and believes that they "provide a constant feeling of detachment" from the racing experience. GameSpot praised the innovative racing team concept, voice support, AI, physics, options, and modes, and criticized the voice recognition system, graphics, lack of iteration upon NASCAR 2005, and lack of more player support for online multiplayer. IGN ultimately concluded that "In all, the additions to Total Team Control make this year's NASCAR a very impressive game worthy of purchase by avid fans of the series or sport, even if they've invested in previous versions. The additions do not, however, represent as solid and as consistent a step forward for the series as last year's did."
