= NASCAR Heat =

2000 video game

- Developers: Monster Games; Digital Illusions CE (PS); Game Titan, Pipe Dream Interactive (GBC)
- Publishers: Hasbro Interactive; Majesco (GBC)
- Platforms: PlayStation, Windows, Game Boy Color
- Release: Windows: NA: August 22, 2000; PlayStation: NA: November 16, 2000; Game Boy Color: NA: December 16, 2000
- Genre: Racing
- Modes: Single-player, multiplayer

NASCAR Heat is a 2000 racing video game for the PlayStation, Windows and Game Boy Color. It was developed by Monster Games and published by Hasbro Interactive. The PlayStation version was co-developed with Digital Illusions CE.

== Gameplay ==
The gameplay in NASCAR Heat centers on competing as licensed NASCAR drivers in stock‑car races across more than a dozen tracks. Players select from the roster of real 2000–2001 Winston Cup drivers and enter events where each race unfolds at high speed against AI‑controlled opponents whose cars generally outpace the player's vehicle. During races, players manage their car's handling and speed while navigating track layouts. Engine sounds and minimal commentary accompany the action, and static screens present drivers and track previews before each event. Multiplayer is available through LAN connections or manually located online servers, allowing human‑versus‑human races. A 60‑page manual provides details on controls, drivers, and tracks.

== Development ==
A PlayStation 2 version of NASCAR Heat was in development.

== Reception ==
Reception

Aggregate scores
Aggregator	Score		
Aggregator	GBC	PC	PS
GameRankings	68%	83%	66%
Metacritic	N/A	81/100	62/100

Review scores
Publication	Score		
Publication	GBC	PC	PS
AllGame	N/A	2.5/5	N/A
CNET Gamecenter	N/A	7/10	4/10
Computer Games Strategy Plus	N/A	3.5/5	N/A
Computer Gaming World	N/A	4/5	N/A
Electronic Gaming Monthly	N/A	N/A	7/10
Game Informer	N/A	N/A	6.5/10
GameSpot	6.8/10	7.5/10	5.2/10
GameSpy	N/A	88%	N/A
IGN	N/A	9/10	8/10
Official U.S. PlayStation Magazine	N/A	N/A	3.5/5
PC Gamer (US)	N/A	80%	N/A

The PC version received "favorable" reviews, while the PlayStation version received "mixed" reviews, according to the review aggregation website Metacritic.

The PC version was nominated for the Racing award at Computer Gaming World's 2001 Premier Awards, which went to Motocross Madness 2.
