= NASCAR Thunder 2002 =

2001 video game developed by EA Tiburon and published by EA Sports

- Xbox cover art featuring the car of Jeff Gordon
- Developers: EA Tiburon; Black Box Games (PSOne version)
- Publisher: Electronic Arts
- Series: EA Sports NASCAR
- Engine: enhanced NASCAR Thunder engine
- Platforms: Xbox, PlayStation, PlayStation 2
- Release: PlayStation: NA: October 2, 2001; PlayStation 2: NA: October 16, 2001; Xbox: NA: November 15, 2001
- Genre: Racing
- Modes: Single-player, Multiplayer

NASCAR Thunder 2002 is a 2001 racing simulator video game developed by EA Tiburon and published by EA Sports that came out for the PlayStation, PlayStation 2, and Xbox. It is the fifth game in the EA Sports NASCAR series of video games following NASCAR 2001, and is the first of the series to have a new title (the other games simply read "NASCAR", followed by the year).

NASCAR Thunder 2002 was the first NASCAR game released for the Xbox and the second released for the PlayStation 2. The theme song for the game on the six-generation systems is "Sweet Home Alabama" by Lynyrd Skynyrd. Notably, it is the first NASCAR game to feature alternate paint schemes on the cars. It featured the 2001 NASCAR Winston Cup Series Champion Jeff Gordon on its cover and 2000 NASCAR Winston Cup Series Champion Bobby Labonte on the disc.

== Gameplay ==
Game modes consist of Create-a-car, Quick race, Season mode, Career mode, and practice. Before every race, the player has the option to qualify for a position at the start of the race, get to know the track in practice, or 'race' other cars in Happy Hour. The game has 35 drivers from the 2001 Winston Cup season (minus Dale Earnhardt due to his death, but the game has many tributes to him including a black No. 3 screen on start-up) and several then-Busch Series and fantasy drivers that can be unlocked.

The PlayStation version was separate from the PS2 and Xbox versions, included only 36 drivers, and included an instant-replay feature, fantasy tracks, only 18 drivers per race, and all of the alternate paint schemes were removed. It also has a different intro without the #3 shown before the EA Sports logo. A system of power-up/cheat cards and challenges, similar to Chase/Thunder plates and Lightning/Dodge Challenges in later editions, was a major game mode in this version. It also included the Daytona Beach track.

== Reception ==
Reception

Aggregate score
Aggregator	Score		
Aggregator	PS	PS2	Xbox
Metacritic	69/100	85/100	82/100

Review scores
Publication	Score		
Publication	PS	PS2	Xbox
Electronic Gaming Monthly	N/A	8.17/10	N/A
Game Informer	N/A	8.5/10	9/10
GamePro	4/5	4.5/5	4.5/5
GameRevolution	N/A	B	B
GameSpot	5.8/10	8.2/10	8/10
GameSpy	N/A	(average)	87%
GameZone	9/10	9/10	N/A
IGN	N/A	8.3/10	8.5/10
Next Generation	N/A	N/A	4/5
Official U.S. PlayStation Magazine	2/5	4.5/5	N/A
Official Xbox Magazine (US)	N/A	N/A	6.9/10
The Cincinnati Enquirer	N/A	N/A	4/5

The PlayStation 2 and Xbox versions received "favorable" reviews, while the PlayStation version received "average" reviews, according to the review aggregation website Metacritic. NextGen said that the Xbox version was "Graphically, a solid game, with great reflections, sun wash, damage modeling, persistent skid marks, and more."

The game was a nominee for the "Console Racing" award at the AIAS' 5th Annual Interactive Achievement Awards, which was ultimately given to Gran Turismo 3: A-Spec.
