= NASCAR Thunder 2004 =

2003 video game

- Cover art with Tony Stewart (PS2)
- Developers: Image Space (Windows); EA Tiburon (PS2, Xbox); Budcat Creations (PS)
- Publisher: EA Sports
- Series: EA Sports NASCAR
- Engine: EAGL
- Platforms: Windows, PlayStation, PlayStation 2, Xbox
- Release: NA: September 16, 2003
- Genre: Racing
- Modes: Single-player, multiplayer

NASCAR Thunder 2004 is a racing simulator by EA Sports, released on September 16, 2003 and available in separate versions for PlayStation, PlayStation 2, Xbox, and Windows. This was the last NASCAR game for the PlayStation. It was succeeded by NASCAR 2005: Chase for the Cup.

It features the 2002 champion Tony Stewart on the cover with a scowling look to represent the new Grudges and Alliances feature. It was the only game as of 2002 to feature the previous Winston Cup Champion on the cover. The game had the most extensive soundtrack of the series up from four songs from the previous game. The game also has a career mode, season mode, Lightning Challenge mode, SpeedZone, as well as a tutorial mode featuring Richard Petty. The game is an EA Sports Bio game, and is compatible with other EA Sports Bio games like Madden NFL 2004 and NCAA Football 2004.

The game was also a sponsored for the 17th edition of World Wrestling Entertainment's Raw and SmackDown pay-per-view Survivor Series, which was taking place on November 16, 2003 from American Airlines Center in Dallas, Texas.

== Gameplay ==
Gameplay screenshot (Windows version)

=== Game modes ===
- Career mode returns from previous games in the series. The player takes control of a custom driver and races to get sponsors, equipment for his or her garage, and respect from other drivers.
- Season mode allows players to take control of either a custom driver, or an existing driver for a season or more, with custom rules and schedules.
- SpeedZone is a mode in which players can hone their skills in passing, blocking, drafting, as well as time trials.
- Lightning Challenge is a mode in which the player takes control of a driver and race in a situation that occurred in the 2002 Winston Cup and 2003 Winston Cup seasons to that particular driver. It also includes a video with Michael Waltrip as the reporter, and beating these challenges unlocks new Thunder Plates, which unlock new tracks, fantasy drivers, Busch Series drivers from the 2003 season, as well as legendary drivers.
- Another new game mode is Online mode, where players can race online if they have an Internet connection and adapter. Microphone support also was available on PC and PlayStation 2. This feature is not available on Xbox and PS1.
- Thunder License, a tutorial mode featuring NASCAR legend Richard Petty, in which the player chooses a driver and follows him along a racing line around the track, with voice commentary by Petty. The racing line can also be toggled in Race Now mode.

=== Grudges and Alliances feature ===
The main feature of the game is the "Grudges and Alliances" feature, which is based on the player's driving style and attitude. If the player drives dirty and bumps into other drivers, even if it was an unintentional bump, that driver becomes a "Rival", and will bump into the player if they happen to encounter each other later in the race. However, if the player drafts the opponent (a new feature for the game), that rival's level in grudge severity drops. If the player drafts a neutral driver long enough, that driver will become an "Ally", and at times will let the player pass. Conversely, if the player bumps into an ally, their alliance will slowly drop. The maximum severity value for both grudges and alliances is -100 and +100, respectively. Players can see their four highest grudges and alliances at the end of the race. In Season and Career modes, the grudges and alliances the player makes carry over to future races.

== Reception ==
Reception

Aggregate score
Aggregator	Score
Metacritic	(PC) 78/100 (PS2) 88/100

Review scores
Publication	Score
GameSpot	(PC) 7.5/10 (PS2/XBOX) 8.8/10
GameSpy	4/5
GameZone	8.4/10
IGN	(PC) 8.5/10 (PS2/XBOX) 8.8/10

The game received positive reviews from critics, with IGN giving the PS2 version an 8.8/10, praising the sounds, "QuickSave", and microphone support. The main issue that IGN cited was that the driving model is somewhat unrealistic. IGN gave the PC version an 8.5, with the issue being the spotter's incompetence. The Xbox review was also an 8.5, and praised the framerate. GameSpot called the game the Tony Hawk or Madden of NASCAR, and gave the game an 8.8, with Metacritic giving it an 88. The more critical review came from GameZone, which gave the game an 8.4.

=== Awards ===
The game received many top awards, the most notable was received at the 2003 Spike Video Game Awards, where NASCAR Thunder 2004 won the award for 2003's best racing game. It is currently the only NASCAR game to win an award at the VGAs. NASCAR Thunder 2004 also nominated for The Electric Playground's 2003 "Best Driving Game for PC" and "Best Console Driving Game" award, but lost to Need for Speed: Underground and Project Gotham Racing 2 respectively.
