= NASCAR Thunder 2003 =

2002 video game

- PlayStation 2 cover art with Dale Earnhardt Jr.
- Developers: EA Tiburon; Budcat Creations (PS); Image Space (Windows)
- Publisher: EA Sports
- Series: EA Sports NASCAR
- Engine: EAGL
- Platforms: PlayStation 2, GameCube, Windows, Xbox, PlayStation
- Release: GameCube, PlayStation, PlayStation 2, Xbox: NA: September 18, 2002; Windows: NA: October 21, 2002
- Genre: Sim racing
- Modes: Single-player, multiplayer

NASCAR Thunder 2003 is the sixth edition of the EA Sports' NASCAR racing simulator series. Developed by EA Tiburon and Budcat Creations and published by EA Sports. It was released for PlayStation, PlayStation 2, GameCube, and Xbox on September 18, 2002, and for Microsoft Windows on October 21. The product features Dale Earnhardt Jr. on the cover. It was the first time the NASCAR's Most Popular Driver Award recipient was featured on the cover, although he did not win the award for the first time until the following year. Dale Earnhardt appeared in the game as a driver as a result of entering his name as a Create-A-Car driver's name; he did not appear in the previous game due to his death. He appeared as a legend in subsequent games.

== Gameplay ==
Being a racing simulation, NASCAR Thunder 2003 places the player in control of a stock car in a NASCAR race. Players battle AI drivers for race position for a preset number of laps. As the race progresses, players are forced to make a pit stop to refuel, replace tires and repair damage.

For multiplayer support, NASCAR Thunder 2003 becomes split-screen and eliminates much of the field. Normally featuring the NASCAR number of 43 drivers in a race, it is limited to 18 or fewer with more than one human driver. As an option, the AI drivers can be disabled, allowing the players to just race each other.

There are two modes available for players. Quick Race simply allows up to four players to participate on any track and race with a specified number of settings. After the race ends, the game returns to the main menu. Career Mode is the most involving mode of the game. Returning from NASCAR Thunder 2002, it places the player in control of a custom NASCAR Winston Cup Series driver, who must manage pit crew, sponsorship and research and development for 20 seasons.

Although Season Mode, like Career Mode, allows the player to play through 20 seasons, it is essentially the Quick Race mode with season standings. Unlike career mode, which starts the player with inferior equipment and pit crew, they are equal to the AI's from the start. Players have a choice to play as either existing or custom drivers, and the settings are completely customizable, unlike the limited options in Career Mode. To achieve multiplayer compatibility, it not only decreases the number of AI drivers in a race while also randomizing them, meaning only a handful of drivers end up participating in the entire season. However, like in Quick Race, they can be disabled for a 2–4 player competition.

Thunder License is the time attack mode of the game; basically a tutorial and time trial of how to race across the included tracks. Lightning Challenges are playable re-enactments of Winston Cup races from 1999, 2000, 2001, and the 1st part of 2002. These challenges are played on all three difficulty levels. The drivers tell the players about what happened to them in the race. The player then has the chance to re-enact or alter history according to the particular scenario's requirement.

== Release ==
A month after the console versions' release, a PC version of NASCAR Thunder 2003 was made available, becoming the second PC game in the series. Despite its later release, it removes all special modes (and the entire Thunder Plate system) except for Season mode. A new testing mode is added, and 16-player multiplayer over the Internet or LAN is supported. It generally received lower scores from reviewers than the console version did.

== Reception ==
Reception

Aggregate score
Aggregator	Score			
Aggregator	GameCube	PC	PS2	Xbox
Metacritic	85/100	68/100	84/100	84/100

Review scores
Publication	Score			
Publication	GameCube	PC	PS2	Xbox
Computer Gaming World	N/A	3.5/5	N/A	N/A
Electronic Gaming Monthly	9/10	N/A	9/10	9/10
Game Informer	9/10	N/A	9/10	9/10
GamePro	4.5/5	N/A	4.5/5	4.5/5
GameSpot	8.1/10	5.1/10	7.9/10	8.1/10
GameSpy	4/5	2/5	4/5	4.5/5
GameZone	9.3/10	9/10	9.1/10	8.5/10
IGN	8.5/10	7.7/10	8.5/10	8.5/10
Nintendo Power	4.2/5	N/A	N/A	N/A
Official U.S. PlayStation Magazine	N/A	N/A	4.5/5	N/A
Official Xbox Magazine (US)	N/A	N/A	N/A	8/10
PC Gamer (US)	N/A	77%	N/A	N/A
The Cincinnati Enquirer	4/5	4/5	4/5	4/5

The game received "favorable" reviews on all platforms except the PC version, which received "average" reviews, according to the review aggregation website Metacritic.

The GameCube version was a runner-up for the "Best Driving Game for GameCube" award at GameSpot's Best and Worst of 2002 Awards, which went to NASCAR: Dirt to Daytona. The game was also a nominee for "Console Racing Game of the Year" at the AIAS' 6th Annual Interactive Achievement Awards, which ultimately went to Need for Speed: Hot Pursuit 2.
