= NASCAR 98 =

1997 video game by Stormfront Studios

NASCAR '98
- North American PlayStation cover art featuring the cars of Jeff Gordon, Dale Earnhardt, Bobby Labonte, and John Andretti
- Developers: Stormfront Studios; High Score Entertainment (Saturn)
- Publisher: EA Sports
- Series: EA Sports NASCAR
- Platforms: PlayStation, Sega Saturn
- Release: PlayStation: NA: September 24, 1997; EU: November 1997; Saturn: EU: 1997; NA: December 5, 1997
- Genre: Sim racing
- Modes: Single-player, multiplayer

NASCAR '98 is a racing simulator video game developed by Stormfront Studios, published by EA Sports, and released in 1997 for Sony PlayStation and Sega Saturn. This was the first game in the EA Sports NASCAR series.

== Gameplay ==
The original (non-collector's edition) version includes 24 NASCAR cars and drivers, including Jeff Gordon, Dale Earnhardt, Mark Martin, Dale Jarrett, Rusty Wallace, John Andretti, and Terry Labonte; 10 official NASCAR tracks, including Charlotte Motor Speedway, Bristol Motor Speedway, and the then Sears Point International Speedway, the short track at Suzuka Japan, and six fantasy circuits, and in-depth car setups. One player can race with all 24 cars or two players can race with 8 cars on the track. There are single-race and Championship Season game modes, and gameplay settings allow the player to race with varying levels of race length, AI difficulty, and realism, among other settings. The AI doesn't pit during long races.

Atlanta Motor Speedway still uses its design from 1996, despite it being modified for 1997.

=== Features ===
==== Instant replay ====
NASCAR '98 includes an instant replay feature, allowing the user to view the race back until about 30 seconds before the action was paused. It can be watched from any of several angles. Non-user cars cannot be focused on in instant replays.

==== Damage, wrecks, and cautions ====
NASCAR '98 has a limited damage system. Portions of the car appear to dent inward after contact, but otherwise nothing changes graphically. A hard enough impact might result in a mechanical failure, or a tire in the region hit hardest might come loose from the car. AI cars stop immediately after contact, while user cars stop accelerating until they slow to a near stop or make contact with a wall or other car. Non-contact random damage consists of an engine failure, in which white smoke pours out from behind the AI car, which slows down and pull to the inside of the track, heading for the pit lane. User cars cannot blow an engine.

Cars can flip, but only after contact with another car and then only rear over front. A car is taken out of the race shortly after a flip in the same way it would after a lost tire.

A caution flag appears after an AI car is taken out of the race. A blue tow truck appears in front of the broken car, and the field gathers into a line just long enough for all the cars to line up. Pitting under caution is not an option, and most cautions do not last a whole lap except at Bristol.

==== Driver profiles ====
In the main menu, there is an option to view a small profile about each driver, featuring a small picture of the driver, a small rotating version of their car, a short biography, and that user's stats for racing with that driver.

== Collectors edition ==
To commemorate the 50th anniversary of NASCAR, a collector's edition for PlayStation with a new cover featuring a black and white picture of one of Richard Petty's 3rd generation (1971–1974) Dodge Chargers racing modern 1998 cars of the day was released. Additions to the game included 'King of NASCAR' Richard Petty in his trademark No. 43 car and Darlington Raceway, the original super speedway. The game came with a NASCAR 50th anniversary key chain as well.

== Reception ==
Reception

Review scores
Publication	Score	
Publication	PS	Saturn
Consoles +	85%	55%
Electronic Gaming Monthly	7.75/10	7/10
Famitsu	24/40	N/A
Game Informer	8.5/10	9/10
GameFan	82%	74%
GameRevolution	B+	N/A
GameSpot	7.9/10	6.5/10
IGN	8/10	N/A
Official U.S. PlayStation Magazine	4/5	N/A
Sega Saturn Magazine	N/A	69%

NASCAR 98 received mostly positive reviews, with critics praising the authentic handling, multiplayer mode, smooth and detailed graphics, and the comprehensive usage of NASCAR licensing, with real world cars, drivers, tracks, and sponsorships. Glenn Rubenstein of GameSpot was particularly pleased at the greater number of cars and relatively small tracks, which together ensure that the player is constantly vying for a place. IGN stated that "With a smooth frame rate and very little draw-in, NASCAR 98 looks and moves almost flawlessly. Even with a crowded track the game moves butter smooth." Some warned that the game would appeal only to hardcore simulation fans, and the average gamer would have more fun with an arcade-style racer. However, Kelly Rickards said in Electronic Gaming Monthly, "You don't have to be a fan of NASCAR to enjoy this game. I don't follow the sport, but I can appreciate all the good things EA did with this game." GamePro gave the PlayStation version a 4.5 out of 5 for graphics and sound and a perfect 5.0 for control and fun factor, commenting, "The popularity of NASCAR racing has mushroomed - it's now only rivaled by the NFL - and this game's powerful combination of sleek graphics, detailed features, and fender-crumpling action will satisfy any serious race fan."

Reviews for the Saturn port were somewhat less favorable than those for the PlayStation original due to the prominent pop-up and other graphical differences. Most felt the game was still good enough to be recommended for Saturn owners. Sega Saturn Magazine was an exception; additionally citing grainy textures, and the PAL conversion's conspicuous borders and slower speed, they gave it a tentative recommendation to simulation-lovers only. GamePro instead argued, "If you have both systems, the PlayStation NASCAR '98 easily laps the Saturn version. But in a season where Saturn titles are few and far between, NASCAR's a solid buy for Sega racers looking for new tracks to conquer." They gave it 3.5 for sound and a 4.0 for graphics, control, and fun factor.

In Japan, where the game was ported and published by Electronic Arts Victor on March 19, 1998, Famitsu gave it a score of 24 out of 40.

NASCAR 98 was a runner-up for "Racing Game of the Year" (behind Diddy Kong Racing) at Electronic Gaming Monthly's 1997 Editors' Choice Awards. It was also nominated for both "Console Racing Game of the Year" and "Console Sports Game of the Year" at the inaugural Interactive Achievement Awards, presented by the Academy of Interactive Arts & Sciences.
