= NASCAR 2005: Chase for the Cup =

2004 video game

- PlayStation 2 Box cover with Kevin Harvick
- Developer: EA Tiburon
- Publisher: EA Sports
- Composer: David Robidoux
- Series: EA Sports NASCAR
- Engine: EAGL 2
- Platforms: GameCube, PlayStation 2, Xbox
- Release: NA: August 31, 2004
- Genre: Racing simulation
- Modes: Single-player, multiplayer

NASCAR 2005: Chase for the Cup is the eighth installment of the EA Sports' NASCAR video game series. It was developed by EA Tiburon and released on August 31, 2004, for PlayStation 2, GameCube, and Xbox. NASCAR 2005 is the first game in the series to drop the word Thunder from the title since NASCAR 2001. Kevin Harvick, driver of the No. 29 GM Goodwrench Chevy Monte Carlo, appeared on the cover replacing Jeremy Mayfield who was originally to have been on the cover and removed completely from the game. It also marks the first time the original PlayStation has been excluded from the NASCAR lineup. This was the first NASCAR edition to be released exclusively on sixth generation home consoles.

Unlike previous entries, which would normally add a few extra features but leave most of the game identical to its predecessor, the game brought massive change to the series. One example is the inclusion of NASCAR series other than the NASCAR Cup Series; the Busch Series (renamed the National Series due to alcohol advertising regulations, though the series is still referred to in-game as the Busch Series by the player's agent and Bill Weber), the Craftsman Truck Series, and the Featherlite Modified Series, plus production cars and the Daytona Prototypes of the Rolex Sports Car Series. More examples include the implementation of NASCAR's new Chase for the Cup points system, and Fight to the Top mode, where the player controls a custom driver throughout his career starting in the lower series and working up the ladder (similar to NASCAR: Dirt to Daytona). Another change is the absence of the cockpit view and the absence of makes and models in the Truck series, all of which appear to be Ford F-150s. Also, due to failed negotiations with licensing, Pocono Raceway is not included. This was the last NASCAR game released for the GameCube. The score is composed by David Robidoux.

== Gameplay ==
=== Lightning Challenges ===
Lightning Challenge mode includes challenges of moments that happened in NASCAR from 2003 and the 1st part of 2004. Michael Waltrip, driver of the No. 15 NAPA Chevrolet, returns as the commentator for all the challenges except for two, Kevin Harvick does the challenges that involve Waltrip being the driver in the challenge. These challenges are played on all difficulty levels. The player must beat a number of challenges at that difficulty level before going to the next difficulty level.

=== Career Mode ===
The player starts out with a street race in Dodge Vipers with Ryan Newman, who afterwards gives the player an offer for a one-year contract in a Modified car. Every car offer is rated between one and five stars, which is showing the quality of the car upgrades and pit crew. As the player gains prestige, they will receive better offers and in the other series, but when enough money has been saved up, the player can create their own team, hire drivers, buy upgrades and train their crew.

=== Multiplayer ===
NASCAR 2005 supported online multiplayer. On 1 October, 2006, the online servers for both the PS2 and Xbox versions were shut down due to "inactivity" online. Despite this, NASCAR 2005 is now playable online on the original Xbox with Insignia, a revival server restoring online functionality to Xbox games.

== Reception ==
Reception

Aggregate score
Aggregator	Score
Metacritic	(PS2) 87/100 (XBOX) 86/100

Review scores
Publication	Score
GameSpot	8.8/10
GameSpy	4/5
IGN	9.2/10

NASCAR 2005 received a runner-up position in GameSpot's 2004 "Best Driving Game" award category across all platforms, losing to Burnout 3: Takedown. IGN wrote, "Chase for the Cup will still appeal to casual and hardcore fans with its impressive production values, clean graphics, incredible audio, and finite conclusion."

== Legacy ==
NASCAR driver Ross Chastain credited the GameCube version of NASCAR 2005 for a maneuver during the 2022 Xfinity 500 in which he drove his car into the outside wall of the track to pick up the unprecedented speed of up to 130 miles per hour (210 km/h) to overtake multiple racers. The maneuver, later dubbed the "Hail Melon", resulted in Chastain being credited with the fastest lap during a NASCAR Cup Series race for Martinsville Speedway and making it into the Championship 4 of the NASCAR playoffs.

== See also ==
- NASCAR SimRacing
