= NASCAR 2001 =

2000 video game

- North American PlayStation 2 cover art featuring the cars of Tony Stewart and Jeff Burton
- Developers: EA Sports (PS2); Black Box Games (PS)
- Publisher: EA Sports
- Series: EA Sports NASCAR
- Platforms: PlayStation, PlayStation 2
- Release: PlayStation: NA: September 19, 2000; PlayStation 2: NA: November 7, 2000
- Genre: Racing
- Modes: Single-player, multiplayer

NASCAR 2001 is a racing simulator video game for PlayStation and PlayStation 2, and the fourth game in the EA Sports's NASCAR series, following NASCAR 2000.

It is the first in the series to include manufacturer representation (although the Windows version of NASCAR 2000 and NASCAR Arcade, released by Sega under EA Sports' license, also featured manufacturer branding) and Daytona International Speedway. The game features tributes to Adam Petty and Kenny Irwin Jr. (who otherwise are also playable drivers), who died during the season the game was based. The game was succeeded by NASCAR Thunder 2002.

== Reception ==
Reception

Aggregate score
Aggregator	Score	
Aggregator	PS	PS2
Metacritic	73/100	66/100

Review scores
Publication	Score	
Publication	PS	PS2
AllGame	N/A	3.5/5
CNET Gamecenter	8/10	7/10
Electronic Gaming Monthly	6/10	5.33/10 (Note: Three critics of Electronic Gaming Monthly gave the PlayStation 2 version each a score of 6/10, 4.5/10, and 5.5/10.)
EP Daily	7.5/10	N/A
Game Informer	6.75/10	8.5/10
GameFan	N/A	69%
GameRevolution	N/A	C−
GameSpot	7.9/10	7.6/10
GameSpy	N/A	55%
GameZone	8.5/10	8/10
IGN	8.1/10	7.8/10
Next Generation	N/A	2/5
Official U.S. PlayStation Magazine	2.5/5	2.5/5

The game received "average" reviews on both platforms according to the review aggregation website Metacritic. However, David Chen of NextGen said of the PlayStation 2 version, "Ultimately as enjoyable as driving in circles, NASCAR 2001 is neither pretty nor fun."

Lamchop of GamePro said in its November 2000 issue, "Ultimately, NASCAR 2001 for the PlayStation is a fast-paced racing game that should keep you glued to the track—if you can overlook the sound issues. At the very least, a rental will get your adrenaline pumping for a weekend of true NASCAR competition fun." (Note: GamePro gave the PlayStation version 4/5 for graphics, 3.5/5 for sound, and two 4.5/5 scores for control and fun factor.) About an issue later, Air Hendrix wrote, "For its rookie season on the PS2, NASCAR 2001 handles like a winner. It's not perfect, but it's close enough to thrill stock-car fans looking for the next cool ride." (Note: GamePro gave the PlayStation 2 version three 4.5/5 scores for graphics, control, and fun factor, and 3.5/5 for sound.)
