= NASCAR SimRacing =

2005 video game developed by EA Tiburon

- Cover art featuring the vehicles of Ryan Newman, Ron Hornaday, and Chad Chaffin
- Developer: EA Tiburon
- Publisher: EA Sports
- Series: EA Sports NASCAR
- Platform: Microsoft Windows
- Release: NA: February 15, 2005
- Genres: Simulation, Sports, Racing
- Modes: Single-player, multiplayer

NASCAR SimRacing, abbreviated NSR, is a computer racing simulator developed by EA Tiburon and released on February 15, 2005, by EA Sports for Microsoft Windows. The game includes all of the 2004 NEXTEL Cup Series drivers (including Jeremy Mayfield, who was absent from NASCAR 2005: Chase for the Cup) and tracks. Content from the 2004 NASCAR Busch Series (branded as "NASCAR National Series" in-game due to alcohol advertising regulations) and Craftsman Truck Series (excluding manufacturer branding in the latter) are also included.

The game features NASCAR's top 3 series, the NASCAR Cup Series, Busch Series, and Craftsman Truck Series. The game features a single-player career mode as well as multiplayer online gameplay. The game also features many paint schemes used during the 2004 and 2005 Cup Series; however the original release featured the 2005 cars replaced with their 2004 counterparts. This game was the last NASCAR game to be released for the PC by EA; the next NASCAR game for PC would be NASCAR The Game: 2013 by Eutechnyx.

== Drivers ==
While a large number of real drivers are present in the Cup, Busch and Truck Series in NASCAR SimRacing, fantasy drivers are still present, sponsored by fictional or unused sponsors. A patch is available at installation to download the 2005 NEXTEL Cup cars as a separate mod. In October 2006 EA Sports shut down the GameSpy multiplayer servers.

== Reception ==
Reception

Aggregate score
Aggregator	Score
Metacritic	85/100

Review scores
Publication	Score
GameSpy	4/5
GameZone	9/10
GameSpot	8.5/10

NASCAR SimRacing received overwhelming positive reviews upon its release. GameSpot rated the game an 8.5 of 10 stating "NASCAR SimRacing looks to be in good hands and should only improve beyond its already praiseworthy state as time goes on."

== See also ==
- NASCAR Road Racing, an earlier PC-only game by EA
