= EA Sports =

Sports gaming brand of Electronic Arts

- Formerly: Electronic Arts Sports Network (1991–1993)
- Type: Division
- Industry: Video games
- Founded: 1991; 35 years ago
- Headquarters: Redwood City, California, U.S.
- Key people: Daryl Holt (COO and VP); Cam Weber (president)
- Products: Video games
- Brands: List: EA Sports Rally; F1; EA Sports FC; Madden NFL; NBA Live; NHL; PGA Tour; Super Mega Baseball; UFC; College Football; WRC
- Parent: Electronic Arts
- Subsidiaries: EA Cologne; EA Madrid; EA Romania; EA Orlando; EA Vancouver; Metalhead Software; Codemasters
- Website: ea.com/sports

EA Sports is a division of Electronic Arts that develops and publishes sports video games. Formerly a marketing gimmick of Electronic Arts, in which they imitated real-life sports networks by calling themselves the "EA Sports Network" (EASN) with pictures or endorsements, it soon grew up to become a sub-label on its own, releasing game series such as EA Sports FC, PGA Tour, NHL, NBA Live, and Madden NFL.

Most games under this brand are developed by EA Vancouver, the Electronic Arts studio in Burnaby, British Columbia, as well as EA Orlando (formerly Tiburon Studios) in Orlando, Florida. The main rival to EA Sports is 2K Sports. Notably, until 2018, both companies competed over the realm of NBA games, with 2K releasing the NBA 2K series. Konami is its rival in association football games with their own series, eFootball.

For several years after the brand was created, all EA Sports games began with a stylized five-second video introducing the brand with Andrew Anthony voicing its motto, "It's in the game", meaning that its games aimed at simulating the actual sports as authentically and completely as possible; Anthony was never compensated for his appearance and did it merely as a favor to a friend.

Unlike some other sports game companies, EA Sports has no special ties to a single platform, which means that all games are released for the best-selling active platforms, sometimes long after most of the other companies abandon them. For example, FIFA 98, Madden NFL 98, NBA Live 98, and NHL 98 were released for the Sega Genesis and the Super NES throughout 1997; Madden NFL 2005 and FIFA 2005 had PlayStation releases in 2004 (FIFA 2005 and Madden NFL 2005 were also the last two PlayStation titles to be released); and NCAA Football 08 had an Xbox release in 2007. Madden NFL 08 also had Xbox and GameCube releases in 2007, and was the final title released for the GameCube, with Madden NFL 09 following as the final Xbox title. Additionally, NASCAR Thunder 2003 and NASCAR Thunder 2004 were released not only for the PlayStation 2, but for the original PlayStation as well. EA Sports brand name is used to sponsor English Football League Two team Swindon Town F.C. from the 2009–10 season onward and the EA Sports Cup in the Republic of Ireland. In July 2021, hackers who breached Electronic Arts in June 2021, had released the entire cache of stolen data after failing to extort the company and later sold the stolen files to a third-party buyer. Prior to the start of the 2023–24 season, EA Sports signed with the Spanish football league association, Liga Nacional de Fútbol Profesional to sponsor both first and second tier competitions which were under the title name, "LaLiga EA Sports" and "LaLiga Hypermotion" for five seasons with the €30 million a year deal.

In June 2023, EA announced a restructuring of the company, having EA Entertainment and EA Sports as two separate divisions inside the business, with Cam Weber becoming the president of the division.

In late September 2025, it was announced parent company Electronic Arts would be acquired for $55 billion by the Public Investment Fund of Saudi Arabia and other investors in a leveraged buyout, which went through later that month, and was completed on August 4, 2026.

== History ==
=== Exclusivity deals ===
In 2003, EA purchased the license to NASCAR for six years, ending competition from Papyrus and Infogrames. The NASCAR license expired in 2009 and the NASCAR license would be owned by Polyphony Digital for the Gran Turismo series starting with Gran Turismo 5, and also Eutechnyx for NASCAR The Game series from 2011 to 2015.

On December 13, 2004, EA Sports signed an exclusive deal with the National Football League (NFL) and its Players' Union for five years. On February 12, 2008, EA Sports announced the extension of its exclusive deal until the 2012 NFL season.

Less than a month after the NFL Exclusive deal on January 11, 2005, EA Sports signed a four-year exclusive deal with the Arena Football League (AFL).

On April 11, 2005, the National Collegiate Athletic Association (NCAA) and EA Sports signed a deal to grant EA Sports the sole rights to produce college football games for six years.

EA lost the rights for Major League Baseball (MLB) games to 2K Sports in 2005, ending EA's MVP series; however, EA made NCAA Baseball games in 2006 and 2007 after losing the MLB license.

In January 2008, EA Sports decided not to renew their NCAA College Baseball license while they evaluated the status of their MVP game engine.

In 2005, EA Sports and ESPN signed a massive 15-year deal for ESPN to be integrated into EA Sports video games from Sega and 2K. EA's use of the ESPN license has steadily increased over the early life of the deal. EA's early usage of the ESPN license began with ESPN Radio and a sports ticker in titles like Madden NFL, NBA Live, Tiger Woods PGA Tour, and NCAA Baseball and Football. The ESPN integration now includes streaming podcasts, text articles (including content only available previously to ESPN Insider subscribers), and ESPN Motion video (including such programs as Pardon the Interruption).

The federal district case O'Bannon v. NCAA, decided in 2014, involved the rights of college athletes to be able to control their likenesses in downstream products from NCAA properties. The case specifically concerned EA's NCAA Basketball 09 when it was first filed in 2009, leading EA to abandon the NCAA Basketball line that year. The case was ruled in favor of the college athletes, which made licensing of these for EA's games more difficult. While EA had continued the NCAA Football series, the NCAA terminated its license agreement with EA in 2013 due to several factors, including the O'Bannon case as well as issues over comparable licensing fees to the professional sports games.

On June 4, 2012, EA signed a "multi-year, multi-product" partnership with the Ultimate Fighting Championship, taking over from THQ.

Following the release of Rory McIlroy PGA Tour in 2015, EA Sports announced that they would end its PGA Tour series after 25 years, with the said game was pulled from digital storefronts in May 2018. 2K Sports announced that they would assume their licensing agreement with the PGA Tour beginning with the release of The Golf Club 2019 featuring PGA Tour in 2018.

The NFL, the NFL's Players' Association, and EA confirmed its exclusivity contract for NFL sports simulation games in May 2020, lasting through at the 2025–2026 NFL season with an optional one-year extension. The new contract allows EA to develop NFL games outside of the typical EA Madden titles, including for mobile games.

In February 2021, EA announced it was returning to college sports with a EA College Football game to be released within the next couple of years. As planned, the game will not use any player likenesses, but instead bypasses the issues with the NCAA by licensing all other branding related to college football such as team names, uniforms, and stadiums through the Collegiate Licensing Company, as at the time of the announcement, the NCAA had not yet reached definitive rules on appropriate payment to players for their likeliness. If such rules are established by the time of the game's release, EA said they would then include player likenesses. However, Notre Dame stated that until such rules are in place, they declined to be part of EA's game. At the time of this announcement, EA stated they had no other agreements with other NCAA sports. Later that month, EA purchased Codemasters, developers of the F1 series, therefore reclaiming the rights to publish F1 games.

EA acquired Metalhead Software in May 2021, the developers of the Super Mega Baseball series. EA stated that they are looking to taking the core aspects of that series to integrate with licensing from MLB to publish a licensed baseball game again in the future.

EA has had deals with FIFA to use the FIFA name and branding for its EA FIFA series, in addition to over 300 separate deals with the leagues and teams for their names, logos, and player likeness rights. According to The New York Times in October 2021, FIFA had started discussions with EA in the prior two years on renewing these rights towards an exclusivity deal but with several caveats that has made negotiations difficult. Among FIFA's requests was increasing the exclusive license fee to $1 billion over each four-year period between FIFA World Cups, and limiting the scope of this exclusivity to association football simulation games, while EA wanted to expand the branding into new video game ventures such as esports using the game, an area that FIFA wanted to either keep to themselves or license to other developers to expand their own revenues. FIFA issued a statement following this report that stated they had reached an impasse with EA on the negotiations. FIFA's position was that it has "a duty to support its 211 member associations to fully capitalise on the inherent opportunities that have been emerging over the recent years. As part of this strategy, FIFA also commits to continuing to organise skill-based eSports tournaments under the umbrella of the recently launched FIFAe competition structure and consumer brand." To that end, FIFA believed it was necessary that any license agreement "must involve more than one party controlling and exploiting all rights". EA has considered that abandoning the FIFA name would have little impact on the player experience since the league and team licenses would be unaffected. EA had trademarked EA Sports FC as a potential replacement name for the series. The last game released under the FIFA banner was 2022's FIFA 23.

On March 2, 2022, EA, along with FIFA, NHL and the NHL Players' Association, the IIHF and F1 announced that they removed any of their names and logo licensing rights involving the Russian and Belarusian teams in both FIFA 22 and NHL 22, citing the recent events related to Russia's invasion of Ukraine. The removals from both games also affected the development of F1 22; with Nikita Mazepin of the Haas F1 Team being replaced by Kevin Magnussen, the Russian Grand Prix being removed from the lineup, and the logos of Mazepin's sponsor Uralkali being removed.

=== PC games ===
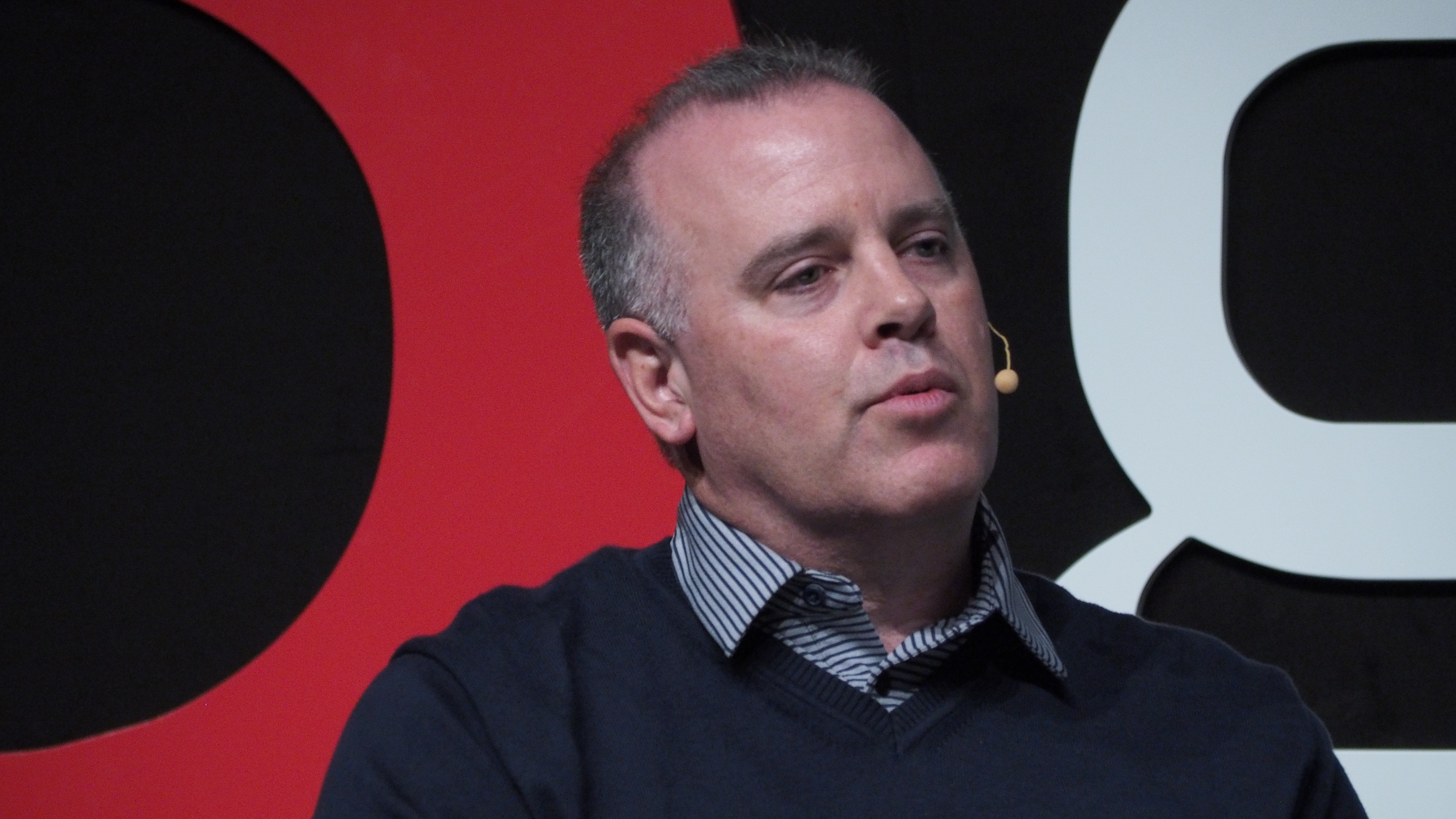
COO and VP Daryl Holt in 2018

For the 2003 game year, and from years 2006 to 2008, EA published compilations of EA Sports titles for Windows called the EA Sports Collection; for example, the 2006 lineup was called the EA Sports 06 Collection.

In June 2009, EA Sports announced that for 2010, the games Madden NFL, NCAA Football, NASCAR, NHL, NBA Live, and Tiger Woods PGA Tour would not be shipped for PC platforms. The NCAA Football series had not been released on the PC since 1998, the Tiger Woods series' last PC game was Tiger Woods PGA Tour 08, the NASCAR series had not had a PC version since NASCAR SimRacing in 2005, and the last Madden series to be released on PC was Madden NFL 08. The NHL series' last PC game was NHL 09. Likewise, NBA Live 08 was the final PC version for NBA Live.

The head of EA Sports at that time, Peter Moore, cited piracy and the fact that the "PC as a platform for authentic, licensed, simulation sports games has declined radically in the past three years as the next generation consoles [...] have attracted millions of consumers."

However, the FIFA series continues to be released on PC, and for the first time since 2008, Madden NFL 19 was released for PC. Following EA's purchase of Codemasters, the F1 series would be published by EA on PC. In 2026, EA release College Football 27 in PC, marking the first game to be release on that platform.

=== PlayStation Home ===
On April 23, 2009, EA Sports released the long-awaited "EA Sports Complex" space for the PlayStation 3's online community-based service, PlayStation Home in the European and North American versions. In the Complex, users can play a series of mini-games, including poker, kart racing, golf, and it also features a Virtual EA Shop. There are also a number of advertisements for upcoming EA Sports games. Each mini-game that the Complex features has a reward or rewards. Heavy Water, a company dedicated to developing for Home, developed the EA Sports Complex for EA Sports.

Originally, the Complex just featured two rooms: the EA Sports Complex and the EA Sports Complex Upstairs. The EA Sports Complex featured racing and had a golfing range that was unavailable to play. With the June 18, 2009 update, the Complex's name changed to the EA Sports Racing Complex and the Upstairs changed to the EA Sports Complex Green Poker Room. Other than the name change, the update took away the golfing range and added four more karts for users to play Racing at and it also added one red poker table to the poker room.

On October 9, 2009, EA Sports released the EA Sports Complex to the Japanese version of Home. They also released NFL jerseys for every team in the league for purchase inside of the EA Sports Complex and in Home's shopping complex. EA Sports have also teamed up with the Home team to produce and distribute exclusive virtual items that serve to support National Breast Cancer Awareness Month.

On August 2, 2011, EA Sports launched the EA Sports Season Ticket subscription service. It was discontinued in 2015 and it was replaced with the similar EA Access service.

== Franchises ==
Most EA Sports games are distinguished by year, as most games are released on a yearly basis. Nevertheless, as EA Sports is the leading purchaser of official licenses, it is not uncommon that in a short span several games of the same sport but with different licenses are released: FIFA: Road to World Cup 98 was shortly followed by World Cup 98, all in the wake of FIFA Soccer Manager in 1997 (as EA has owned the license for the FIFA World Cup, which happens regularly in four-year intervals, since 1998), and college football and basketball games are released that are based on Madden NFL and NBA Live, respectively.

Series	Sport	First release	Latest release	Upcoming release
Super Mega Baseball	Baseball	Super Mega Baseball 4 (2023)		
Madden NFL	American football	John Madden Football (1988)	Madden NFL 27 (2026)	
NHL	Ice hockey	NHL Hockey (1991)	NHL 27 (2026)	
EA Sports FC	Association football	EA Sports FC 24 (2023)	EA Sports FC 27 (2026)	
EA Sports UFC	Mixed martial arts	EA Sports UFC (2014)	EA Sports UFC 6 (2026)	
F1	Formula One	F1 2000 (2000)	F1 25 (2025)	
NCAA/College Football	American football (College)	Bill Walsh College Football (1993)	EA Sports College Football 27 (2026)	

=== Former ===
Series	Sport	First release	Last release
PGA Tour	Golf	PGA Tour Golf (1990)	EA Sports PGA Tour (2023)
FIFA	Association football	FIFA International Soccer (1993)	FIFA 23 (2022)
NBA Live	Basketball	NBA Live 95 (1994)	NBA Live 19 (2018)
Mutant League Football	American football	Mutant League Football (1993)	
Mutant League Hockey	Ice hockey	Mutant League Hockey (1994)	
Mario Andretti Racing	Auto racing	Mario Andretti Racing (1994)	Andretti Racing (1996)
Australian Rugby League	Rugby league	Australian Rugby League (1995)	
Cricket	Cricket	Cricket 96 (1996)	Cricket 07 (2006)
Triple Play / MVP Baseball	MLB Baseball	Triple Play Baseball '96 (1995)	MVP Baseball 2005 (2005)
NASCAR	Stock car racing	NASCAR 98 (1997)	NASCAR 09 (2008) / NASCAR Kart Racing (2009)
AFL	Australian rules football	AFL 98 (1997)	AFL 99 (1998)
FIFA Manager	Association football management	FIFA Soccer Manager (1997)	FIFA Manager 14 (2013)
NCAA Basketball	NCAA Basketball	NCAA March Madness 98 (1998)	NCAA Basketball 10 (2009)
Knockout Kings / Fight Night	Boxing	Knockout Kings (1998)	Fight Night Champion (2011)
Superbike	Superbike	Superbike World Championship (1999)	Superbike 2001 (2000)
Supercars	Supercars	V8 Challenge (2002)	
SSX	Snowboarding	SSX (2000)	SSX (2012)
Rugby	Rugby union	Rugby (2000)	Rugby 08 (2007)
NBA Street	Streetball	NBA Street (2001)	NBA Street Homecourt (2007)
NFL Street	Street football	NFL Street (2004)	NFL Street 3 (2006)
FIFA Street	Street soccer	FIFA Street (2005)	FIFA Street (2012)
MVP: NCAA Baseball	NCAA Baseball	MVP 06: NCAA Baseball (2006)	MVP 07: NCAA Baseball (2007)
Arena Football	Arena football	Arena Football (2006)	Arena Football: Road to Glory (2007)
EA Sports Active	Training	EA Sports Active (2009)	EA Sports Active 2 (2010)
Grand Slam Tennis	Tennis	Grand Slam Tennis (2009)	Grand Slam Tennis 2 (2012)
MMA	Mixed martial arts	EA Sports MMA (2010)	
WRC	World Rally Championship	EA Sports WRC (2023)	
