= NASCAR The Game =

Video game series

- Genres: NASCAR, auto racing, sim racing
- Developer: Eutechnyx
- Publishers: Activision, Deep Silver, Dusenberry Martin Racing
- Platforms: PlayStation 3, Xbox 360, Wii, Microsoft Windows
- First release: NASCAR The Game: 2011; May 24, 2011
- Latest release: NASCAR '15; May 22, 2015

NASCAR The Game, occasionally abbreviated as NTG, is a discontinued series of NASCAR video games developed by Eutechnyx, which held the NASCAR license from 2011 to the end of 2015. The first installment, NASCAR The Game: 2011, is the first NASCAR game to have been released since EA Sports relinquished the license after NASCAR 09 in 2008.

== Games ==
=== Core games ===
Game	Season	Publisher	PC	Consoles
NASCAR The Game: 2011	2010, 2011	Activision	—N/a	PS3, 360, Wii
NASCAR The Game: Inside Line	2012, 2013	Activision	—N/a	PS3, 360, Wii
NASCAR The Game: 2013	2013	Activision	Windows	—N/a
NASCAR '14	2014	Deep Silver	Windows	PS3, 360
NASCAR '15	2015	Dusenberry Martin Racing	Windows	PS3, 360

=== Arcade and manager ===
Game	Season	Developer	Publisher	Platform(s)
NASCAR Unleashed	2011	Firebrand Games	Activision	PS3, 360, Wii, Nintendo 3DS
NASCAR Redline	2013	Eutechnyx Limited	Activision	iPhone, iPad, Android

== History ==
In September 2010, Activision and Eutechnyx announced the development of NASCAR The Game: 2011 for the Xbox 360, PlayStation 3, and Nintendo Wii. Developer Eutechnyx had signed a multi-year to be the new licensee for NASCAR games, with Activision acting as the publisher. The second title in the series, NASCAR The Game: Inside Line, was released on November 6, 2012. In July 2013, Eutechnyx released NASCAR The Game: 2013 (an optimized version of NTG: Inside Line) for Microsoft Windows, the first licensed NASCAR game for PC since 2005. After Eutechnyx had announced plans to self-publish future NASCAR games, in October 2013, Deep Silver announced it had picked up the publishing rights for the series. Under Deep Silver, NASCAR '14 was released on February 18, 2014. In January 2015, Dusenberry Martin Racing (formally known as DMi Games), acquired the NASCAR licence from Eutechnyx, publishing NASCAR '15 as an update to NASCAR '14.

As opposed to annual releases, like in the EA Sports series, Eutechnyx chose to release semi-annual games and add new seasons as downloadable content. NASCAR The Game: 2011 features the 2010 and 2011 seasons, and NASCAR The Game: Inside Line features the 2012 and 2013 seasons. Likewise, NASCAR 15 was released as an update to NASCAR 14, and priced significantly lower than most video games. Eutechnyx lost the NASCAR license to 704Games in 2015.

== Gameplay ==
NASCAR The Game was designed to appeal to the casual video game player, as opposed to full simulators such as NASCAR Racing 2003 Season and iRacing. Eutechnyx describes the series as the most realistic experience available on the consoles.

=== Presentation ===
In all iterations of the game, the Main Menu is presented as the interior of a team's home garage, with crew members working on cars, and fans observing from an upper balcony. Beginning with NTG: Inside Line, the race day menu was presented as the infield garage of each racetrack. The Loading Screen is presented as a bulletin board, featuring decals of NASCAR contingency sponsors, advertisements for Sprint wireless products, and photos of in-race action from the current game and prior games, and photos the player captures during gameplay. It features a V.I.P or press pass-style lanyard showing the track specifications and the player's stats at the track. This lanyard was shared with NASCAR on Fox's race coverage graphics.

The series features Cautions (and occasional Red Flags due to excessive wrecks), free pass and wave-arounds, double-file restarts, and Green–white–checker finishes. Beginning with NASCAR '14, group qualifying was integrated. Also in NASCAR '14, starts and restarts were upgraded, allowing the player to take control of the car within the "restart zone", as opposed to when the car crosses the start-finish line. This is improved over prior console games, though not as in-depth as simulators in-which the player controls the car during pace laps and pit-stops.

The series' first installment, NASCAR The Game: 2011, features pre-race commentary from Performance Racing Network radio announcers Doug Rice and Mark Garrow. Later editions of the game feature commentary from NASCAR on Fox lead announcers Mike Joy and Darrell Waltrip (with Larry McReynolds absent). The pre-race presentation features military aircraft flyovers, fireworks, and the 43-car grid on pit road. In-car audio features former Dale Earnhardt, Inc. and current Michael Waltrip Racing executive Ty Norris as spotter. Ray Evernham is featured as crew chief in NTG: Inside Line, replaced by Jeff Hammond in later games. NASCAR race director David Hoots is also featured.

=== Physics and damage model ===
Contrary to the initial promotional trailer for NTG: 2011, which features a dramatic crash scene with highly realistic damage, Nascar The Game uses a "scaled back" damage model. This model is less realistic than pure simulators, but more rigid and less forgiving than prior console games. Some damage is visually realistic, with debris falling off cars having the ability to puncture tires. Colliding with outside walls does have the effect of damaging the chassis, altering the handling of the car. The overall effects on performance, however are gradual, with heavy impacts only creating minor or moderate visual damage and performance effects. Additionally, any effects on performance can be fixed with a pit stop. For NASCAR '14, Eutechnyx partnered with Nvidia to enhance smoke and debris effects.

=== A.I. and animations ===
For the game-controlled cars in single-player mode, the developers sought to replicate the real-life racing styles of the drivers, including differences in aggression and performance. Beginning with NASCAR The Game: Inside Line, the developers used positional and telemetry data recorded by NASCAR during races and driver performance statistics to construct each computer-controlled driver. This includes bump drafting initiated by the A.I. cars. Like in other NASCAR games, pit stops were replicated using motion capture of real-life pit crew members.

=== Paint Booth ===
NASCAR The Game features an in-depth 3-D Paint Booth, allowing players to create custom paint schemes. Individual car parts can be painted, and several decals from geometric shapes to patterns can be enlarged, skewed, and pasted to create custom designs. Sponsor logos, including contingency sponsors and primary team sponsors such as Bass Pro Shops, and custom text can be added. The Paint Booth is expanded from most other NASCAR games, except for NASCAR Racing 2003 Season, NASCAR 09, and IRacing which allow for outside creation in computer paint programs such as Adobe Photoshop and Paint.NET.

=== Game modes ===
NASCAR The Game includes several races modes, including Quick Race (or Single Race or Race Now), Single Season, Track Testing, and offline Split-Screen.

==== Career Mode ====
In its initial release, NTG's career mode is simply a more in-depth version of season mode, in which the player controls one of the featured NASCAR drivers through the course of a season. It includes minimal management roles, such as unlocking sponsorship over the course of the mode.

Beginning in NASCAR The Game: Inside Line, a new more in-depth career mode was introduced, similar to that of NASCAR Thunder 2004. The player assumes the role of a rookie Sprint Cup Series driver, managing the day-to-day operations of a startup single-car-team (though it is implied that there is a principal team owner). The player is placed in a two-lap test session (typically at Indianapolis Motor Speedway or Auto Club Speedway) to evaluate driving skill, with the game suggesting assist levels for the mode moving forward. The player is then placed in a minimally or unsponsored ride with bottom-end equipment, but can earn primary and associate sponsorship and in-game-credits towards equipment upgrades. In NTG: Inside Line and its PC counterpart NTG: 2013, the player is placed in a Sprint-sponsored car, with paint schemes dictated by the primary sponsor, and associate sponsor placement determined by the game. For NASCAR '14, the career mode was further expanded, including the utilization of the Paint Booth to create custom career paint schemes and allow the user to choose the placement of sponsor logos. The equipment management aspect was also expanded, including the necessity to purchase individual car components such as engines and car bodies, and the ability to invest in research and development.

==== NASCAR Highlights ====
NASCAR Highlights is a game mode which takes the player through real-life situations from the preceding Sprint Cup Series season. The mode is a successor to the Lightning Challenges (later the Dodge Challenges) from the EA Sports NASCAR series. Like the A.I., the scenarios are constructed using in-race telemetry.

==== Head-to-Head ====
This mode allows the player to run test laps against a "ghost car" of a Sprint Cup Series driver, with the objective of beating their real-life best lap from the previous season. It resembles the "Thunder Licence" mode from NASCAR Thunder 2004, although unlike in NASCAR Thunder, no rewards are given for beating the best lap.

==== Online ====
NTG allows up to 16 players to compete in online races. Online leagues were added in NASCAR '14. The online mode does not, however, feature A.I. cars to fill out a full field.

=== Car liveries and drivers ===
Like its predecessors, the NASCAR The Game installments feature part-time drivers, Xfinity Series (formerly Nationwide Series) and Gander RV & Outdoors Truck Series (formerly Camping World) drivers as field fillers. The exclusion of certain teams is due to licensing deadlines or lack of interest from certain teams. NASCAR The Game: Inside Line is the only game in the series to feature 43 licensed Sprint Cup Series entries upon release.

The series features several "special" or associate sponsor paint schemes in addition to primary schemes. Beginning with NASCAR The Game: Inside Line, each scheme was designed to replicate its real-life counterpart in a specific race, as opposed to schemes designed in conjunction with team and sponsor input. For example, David Ragan's 2012 Al's Liners/Scorpion Window Film scheme, which had minor changes over the course of the season, was designed in the game to replicate the version run in the Daytona 500. While NTG: Inside Line included over 120 schemes, additional schemes in later games required the purchase of DLC.

== See also ==
- List of NASCAR video games
