= NASCAR The Game: 2011 =

2011 racing video game

- Game box art featuring the cars of Jimmie Johnson and Mark Martin
- Developer: Eutechnyx
- Publisher: Activision
- Designer: Gareth Wright
- Series: NASCAR, NASCAR The Game
- Platforms: PlayStation 3, Xbox 360, Wii
- Release: PlayStation 3, Xbox 360: NA: April 28, 2011 / June 11, 2011; AU: April 30, 2011 / June 13, 2011; EU: May 15, 2011 / July 5, 2011; JP: May 26, 2011 / July 15, 2011; RU: June 1, 2011 / July 22, 2011; Wii: NA: May 24, 2011
- Genres: Auto racing, Sim racing
- Modes: Single-player, multiplayer

NASCAR The Game: 2011, also known as NASCAR 2011: The Game, is a 2011 racing video game, developed by Eutechnyx and published by Activision. It is the first edition of the NASCAR The Game racing simulator series. Developed by Eutechnyx and published by Activision, it was released for PlayStation 3 and Xbox 360 on March 29, 2011, then for Wii on May 24. It is the first NASCAR game since the contract between EA Sports and NASCAR expired (not including Gran Turismo 5), and the first by Activision Blizzard since NASCAR Racing 2003 Season (from Sierra, a subsidiary of Vivendi Universal Games, and now Activision Blizzard).

== Gameplay ==
=== Features ===
NASCAR The Game: 2011 is the first game relating to NASCAR from Eutechnyx. One of the features is a career mode, which lets players compete at all the tracks on the 2010 or 2011 schedule and compete for a NASCAR Sprint Cup Series championship. The game also features ferocious damage caused by accidents on the track. It also features cars from the 2010 and 2011 seasons. Some types of accidents include catapulting cars into the air and barrel-rolling over others leaving fragments of the car, commonly called debris, scattered across the track. This feature allows all areas of the car to display damage build up realistically, in relation to the impacts during the race. It also has enhanced AI to compare with the characteristics of actual drivers. The player is able to tune and adjust their car's handling, and change the paint color, decals, number and sponsor logos. The controls and HUD are completely customizable as well. There is also a scrolling ticker across the top of the screen during a race with updates that include the amount of time behind leader, the time behind the car in front of player, and the time in front of the car behind player.

Other features on the game include pit stops and spotters. The pit stop feature displays the pit crew changing the tires and fueling the car. Pit stops average 14 seconds. Each animation was actually photographed from real Sprint Cup Series teams. The spotter feature informs the player of the drivers in the race that assists them, such as bump drafting, blocking, and slingshot. The spotter also alerts the player of any hazards happening ahead, as well as behind. Furthermore, the spotter has calculated suggestions on pit strategy, such as fuel level, tire wear, the number of laps remaining, and the player's position in the race and in the point standings. The game has an interactive celebration mode where players can do burnouts and victory lap, as well. The player then goes to an animation involving an out-of-car celebration, Carl Edwards and can result in a backflip off of the car. If he or she is in career mode, they will go to victory lane and pop the ceremonious bottle and pour it all on their team. In the game, players can earn NASCAR experience points to unlock rewards. Some rewards include career sponsorships and special races throughout career mode. These special races are called "invitational events". These allow to unlock special custom paint schemes after completing each challenge in each event.

== Commentary ==
The game features commentary from the announcers of the Performance Racing Network including play-by-play man Doug Rice and color Commentator Mark Garrow. The in-race spotter is voiced by Michael Waltrip Racing’s Ty Norris.

== Development ==
The game was officially announced on September 29, 2010 by Activision and Eutechnyx, even though there were rumors of a new NASCAR game since the expiration of NASCAR's contract with EA Sports. The game's platforms are PlayStation 3, Xbox 360, and Wii.

NASCAR 2011 was delayed few times in 2011 until March 29. Developers cited the need to include additional features, test for bugs, and tweak the gameplay as their reasoning for the problems that affected the original release date. The Wii version of the game was released in May 24. Like in the EA Sports NASCAR games, there are no available alcoholic sponsors until NASCAR '15 Victory Edition.

== Reception ==
Reception

Aggregate scores
Aggregator	Score
GameRankings	63.07% (PS3); 62.11% (Xbox 360); 40.20% (Wii)
Metacritic	62/100 (PS3); 62/100 (Xbox 360); 42/100 (Wii)

Review scores
Publication	Score
Eurogamer	6/10
Game Informer	7/10
GameSpot	6/10 (WII) 4/10
GamesRadar+	3/5
IGN	6/10 (WII) 4.5/10
Nintendo World Report	(WII) 4.5/10

The game overall has received mixed reviews. GameSpot gave the game a 6.0/10, citing that "when the game finds its groove, it delivers a good sense of enjoyable tension that rewards smart, controlled driving. Unfortunately, the more deeply you dig, the deeper the hole NASCAR 2011 digs itself into". The reviewer, Kevin VanOrd, criticized the faulty online play and the erratic caution flags. Game Industry News reviewer Todd Hargosh gave the game 3 out of 5 "gems", stating that the game overall was a "freshman effort" for Eutechnyx. IGN gave a similar review, rating it 6.0/10. The Wii version reviews, however, were mostly negative. IGN gave the game a 4.5/10, stating that "even if you bleed NASCAR, NASCAR The Game 2011 simply doesn't deliver. While it offers up some fun, the lack of control finesse, poor graphics, and missing customization make it one to pass up".
