= NASCAR The Game: Inside Line =

2012 racing videogame by Eutechnyx

- Cover art for Xbox 360 version showing Dale Earnhardt Jr.
- Developer: Eutechnyx (Note: Ported to Wii by Brain in a Jar)
- Publisher: Activision
- Series: NASCAR, NASCAR The Game
- Platforms: Microsoft Windows, PlayStation 3, Wii, Xbox 360
- Release: PlayStation 3, Wii, Xbox 360: NA: 6 November 2012; Microsoft Windows: NA: 24 July 2013
- Genres: Auto racing, Sim racing, Racing

NASCAR The Game: Inside Line is the second edition of the NASCAR The Game racing simulator series, and the sequel to NASCAR The Game: 2011. The game simulates the 2012 and 2013 Cup Series seasons. Developed by Eutechnyx and published in the United States by Activision, it was released for PlayStation 3, Wii and Xbox 360 on 6 November 2012. A PC version for Windows was released in July 2013 entitled NASCAR The Game: 2013. All the 23 Sprint Cup Series race tracks are featured in the game, with the addition of various Cup Series drivers, teams and cars. The game's cover features NASCAR driver Dale Earnhardt Jr. his first cover since NASCAR Thunder 2003.

This is also the fourth and final NASCAR game for the Wii, after NASCAR Kart Racing, NASCAR The Game: 2011 and NASCAR Unleashed.

== Gameplay ==
=== Features ===
NASCAR The Game: Inside Line is the second game relating to NASCAR from Eutechnyx. One of the features is a more in-depth career mode which allows players to race in the Cup series, attract new sponsorships and upgrade their car's components. The career mode, as well as the online mode, also includes more realistic race weekends. All of the 23 tracks as well as many Sprint Cup Series drivers, teams and cars is included in the game. The voices of Mike Joy and Darrell Waltrip from NASCAR on Fox are featured during pre-race cutscenes. Former crew chief and NASCAR on ESPN analyst Ray Evernham is also featured during the garage setup scenes.

As with the first two Wii NASCAR games, Kart Racing and The Game: 2011, the Wii version of Inside Line leverages the Wii Remote's versatility and motion controls and legacy support of GameCube controllers to offer multiple control schemes.

=== A.I. and animations ===
For the game-controlled cars in single-player mode, the developers used positional and telemetry data recorded by NASCAR during races as well as driver performance statistics to replicate the real-life racing styles of the drivers. This includes bump drafting initiated by the A.I. cars. Like in other NASCAR games, pit stops were replicated using motion capture of real-life pit crew members.

=== Gen 6 cars ===
The Generation 6 Cars were included in downloadable content for the PlayStation 3 and Xbox 360, updating the game for the 2013 season. The cars were expected to be released for play sometime around the time of the Daytona 500 in February, but due to an issue while trying to release an update, they were not fully revealed until 31 March and released on 2 April. The DLC was not free, requiring the purchase of individual schemes or the Season Pass. Certain schemes were released for free late in the season for a week's time after the driver scored a victory. There were no more Generation 6 paint schemes due to technical issues.

=== Windows version ===
Eutechnyx made NASCAR The Game: 2013, an optimized version of NASCAR The Game: Inside Line developed for Microsoft Windows. The game was the first officially licensed PC NASCAR game since NASCAR SimRacing in 2005. The Windows version was released in July 2013.

Like the console DLC, the PC version features the Gen-6 cars from the 2013 Sprint Cup Series season and updated 2013 season roster of drivers. Eutechnyx released for-purchase DLC packs that added over 80 additional paint schemes in September.

== Reception ==
Reception

Aggregate score
Aggregator	Score
Metacritic	(X360) 72/100 (PS3) 76/100 (PC) 64/100

Review score
Publication	Score
Game Informer	7.25/10

Game Informer praised the game for the improvements it made over the last entry, stating, Inside Line is a step up from its predecessor in every way, but it falls short of being a winner.
