= 2013 GEICO 400 =

Race details
- Race 27 of 36 in the 2013 NASCAR Sprint Cup Series
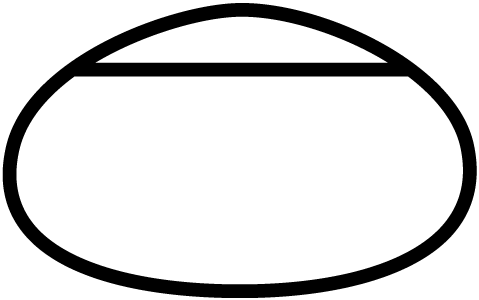
- Chicagoland Speedway track layout
- Date: September 15, 2013
- Location: Chicagoland Speedway; Joliet, Illinois, United States
- Course: Permanent racing facility
- Course length: 1.500 miles (2.414 km)
- Distance: 267 laps, 400.5 mi (644.5 km)
- Weather: Temperatures up to 70.5 °F (21.4 °C); wind speeds up to 6 miles per hour (9.7 km/h)

Pole position
Driver	Joey Logano	Penske Racing
- Time: 28.509 seconds

Most laps led
Driver	Matt Kenseth	Joe Gibbs Racing
- Laps: 89

Winner
No. 20	Matt Kenseth	Joe Gibbs Racing

Television in the United States
- Network: ESPN
- Announcers: Allen Bestwick, Andy Petree and Dale Jarrett

The 2013 GEICO 400 was a NASCAR Sprint Cup Series stock car race held on September 15, 2013, at Chicagoland Speedway in Joliet, Illinois, United States. Contested over 267 laps on the 1.500-mile (2.414 km) tri-oval, it was the twenty-seventh in the 2013 NASCAR Sprint Cup Series season, as well as the first race in the ten-race Chase for the Sprint Cup, which ends the season.

Matt Kenseth of Joe Gibbs Racing won the race, his career best sixth of the season, teammate Kyle Busch finished second, Kevin Harvick, Kurt Busch, and Jimmie Johnson rounded out the top five.

== Report ==
=== Background ===
Chicagoland Speedway is a four-turn tri-oval track that is 1.500 miles (2.414 km) long. The track's turns are each banked at 18 degrees and have a turn width of 55 feet (17 m). The racetrack has a grandstand capacity of 75,000 spectators, and has a 11,050-square-foot (1,027 m^{2}) garage area. Brad Keselowski was the race's defending champion.

Before the race, Matt Kenseth led the Drivers' Championship with 2,015 points, with Jimmie Johnson and Kyle Busch tied for second place with 2,012. Kevin Harvick and Carl Edwards had a total of 2,006 points, while Joey Logano and Greg Biffle were sixth and seventh with 2,003. Clint Bowyer, and Dale Earnhardt Jr., Kurt Busch, Kasey Kahne, Ryan Newman, and Jeff Gordon rounded out the Chase field with 2,000 points each. In the Manufacturers' Championship, Chevrolet was leading with 178 points, ten points ahead of Toyota. Ford, with 141 points, was in the third position.

=== Entry list ===
(R) - Denotes rookie driver.

(i) - Denotes driver who is ineligible for series driver points.

No.	Driver	Team	Manufacturer
1	Jamie McMurray	Earnhardt Ganassi Racing	Chevrolet
2	Brad Keselowski	Penske Racing	Ford
5	Kasey Kahne	Hendrick Motorsports	Chevrolet
7	Dave Blaney	Tommy Baldwin Racing	Chevrolet
9	Marcos Ambrose	Richard Petty Motorsports	Ford
10	Danica Patrick (R)	Stewart–Haas Racing	Chevrolet
11	Denny Hamlin	Joe Gibbs Racing	Toyota
13	Casey Mears	Germain Racing	Ford
14	Mark Martin	Stewart–Haas Racing	Chevrolet
15	Clint Bowyer	Michael Waltrip Racing	Toyota
16	Greg Biffle	Roush Fenway Racing	Ford
17	Ricky Stenhouse Jr. (R)	Roush Fenway Racing	Ford
18	Kyle Busch	Joe Gibbs Racing	Toyota
20	Matt Kenseth	Joe Gibbs Racing	Toyota
22	Joey Logano	Penske Racing	Ford
24	Jeff Gordon	Hendrick Motorsports	Chevrolet
27	Paul Menard	Richard Childress Racing	Chevrolet
29	Kevin Harvick	Richard Childress Racing	Chevrolet
30	Cole Whitt (i)	Swan Racing	Toyota
31	Jeff Burton	Richard Childress Racing	Chevrolet
32	Timmy Hill (R)	FAS Lane Racing	Ford
33	Tony Raines (i)	Circle Sport	Chevrolet
34	David Ragan	Front Row Motorsports	Ford
35	Josh Wise (i)	Front Row Motorsports	Ford
36	J. J. Yeley	Tommy Baldwin Racing	Chevrolet
38	David Gilliland	Front Row Motorsports	Ford
39	Ryan Newman	Stewart–Haas Racing	Chevrolet
40	Landon Cassill (i)	Circle Sport	Chevrolet
42	Juan Pablo Montoya	Earnhardt Ganassi Racing	Chevrolet
43	Aric Almirola	Richard Petty Motorsports	Ford
47	A. J. Allmendinger	JTG Daugherty Racing	Toyota
48	Jimmie Johnson	Hendrick Motorsports	Chevrolet
51	Justin Allgaier (i)	HScott Motorsports	Chevrolet
55	Brian Vickers (i)	Michael Waltrip Racing	Toyota
56	Martin Truex Jr.	Michael Waltrip Racing	Toyota
78	Kurt Busch	Furniture Row Racing	Chevrolet
83	David Reutimann	BK Racing	Toyota
87	Joe Nemechek (i)	NEMCO-Jay Robinson Racing	Toyota
88	Dale Earnhardt Jr.	Hendrick Motorsports	Chevrolet
93	Travis Kvapil	BK Racing	Toyota
95	Reed Sorenson (i)	Leavine Family Racing	Ford
98	Michael McDowell	Phil Parsons Racing	Ford
99	Carl Edwards	Roush Fenway Racing	Ford
Official entry list

=== Practice and qualifying ===
Three practice sessions were held before the race. The first session, scheduled on September 13, 2013, was 90 minutes long. The second and third, held a day later on September 14, 2013, were 55 and 50 minutes long. In the first practice session, Ricky Stenhouse Jr. was the quickest with a best lap time of 28.774 seconds. Kurt Busch followed in second, ahead of Edwards and Johnson in third and fourth. Juan Pablo Montoya was scored fifth quickest with a best lap time of 28.853, seven-tenths slower than Stenhouse. Logano, Biffle, Aric Almirola, Brad Keselowski, and Bowyer completed the top-ten.

After the first practice session, NASCAR discussed the second half of what became known as Spingate, the race fixing scandal that took place during the last ten laps of the previous week's race in Richmond, which was still under investigation. NASCAR had uncovered radio chatter between two Roush Fenway Racing affiliated teams (Penske and Front Row). At 2:55 PM CT, NASCAR held a press conference to discuss the results and placed both Ford teams in question on probation for the rest of 2013. Furthermore, after discussions that took place because of the first part of the rule where which Michael Waltrip Racing ordered Brian Vickers to pit in order to help Martin Truex Jr. get into the Chase, and later disqualifying the #56 of Truex from the Chase while reinstating the #39 of Ryan Newman, NASCAR had no choice but to add Jeff Gordon, who was the victim of both manipulations, to the Chase as the 13th team. Chairman Brian France has always had the power to expand the Chase field in exceptional circumstances, and decided to invoke this power in order to add Gordon to the Chase. According to France, "There were too many things that went on Saturday night that provided a clear disadvantage (to the #24 team)" for him not to take this action. Ironically, Joey Logano, one of the drivers involved in the controversy, set a new track qualifying record, qualifying on pole with a time of 28.509 seconds, and speed of 189.414 mph.

== Results ==
=== Qualifying ===
Grid	No.	Driver	Team	Manufacturer	Time	Speed
1	22	Joey Logano	Penske Racing	Ford	28.509	189.414
2	2	Brad Keselowski	Penske Racing	Ford	28.534	189.248
3	42	Juan Pablo Montoya	Earnhardt Ganassi Racing	Chevrolet	28.562	189.062
4	5	Kasey Kahne	Hendrick Motorsports	Chevrolet	28.604	188.785
5	17	Ricky Stenhouse Jr.	Roush Fenway Racing	Ford	28.606	188.772
6	24	Jeff Gordon	Hendrick Motorsports	Chevrolet	28.641	188.541
7	16	Greg Biffle	Roush Fenway Racing	Ford	28.645	188.515
8	99	Carl Edwards	Roush Fenway Racing	Ford	28.669	188.357
9	48	Jimmie Johnson	Hendrick Motorsports	Chevrolet	28.677	188.304
10	20	Matt Kenseth	Joe Gibbs Racing	Toyota	28.678	188.298
11	27	Paul Menard	Richard Childress Racing	Chevrolet	28.678	188.298
12	18	Kyle Busch	Joe Gibbs Racing	Toyota	28.679	188.291
13	47	A. J. Allmendinger	JTG Daugherty Racing	Toyota	28.681	188.278
14	56	Martin Truex Jr.	Michael Waltrip Racing	Toyota	28.684	188.258
15	43	Aric Almirola	Richard Petty Motorsports	Ford	28.704	188.127
16	78	Kurt Busch	Furniture Row Racing	Chevrolet	28.712	188.075
17	29	Kevin Harvick	Richard Childress Racing	Chevrolet	28.730	187.957
18	88	Dale Earnhardt Jr.	Hendrick Motorsports	Chevrolet	28.742	187.878
19	34	David Ragan	Front Row Motorsports	Ford	28.798	187.513
20	39	Ryan Newman	Stewart–Haas Racing	Chevrolet	28.845	187.207
21	31	Jeff Burton	Richard Childress Racing	Chevrolet	28.892	186.903
22	11	Denny Hamlin	Joe Gibbs Racing	Toyota	28.906	186.812
23	10	Danica Patrick	Stewart–Haas Racing	Chevrolet	28.912	186.774
24	15	Clint Bowyer	Michael Waltrip Racing	Toyota	28.915	186.754
25	55	Brian Vickers	Michael Waltrip Racing	Toyota	28.963	186.445
26	9	Marcos Ambrose	Richard Petty Motorsports	Ford	29.019	186.085
27	1	Jamie McMurray	Earnhardt Ganassi Racing	Chevrolet	29.051	185.880
28	30	Cole Whitt	Swan Racing	Toyota	29.067	185.778
29	14	Mark Martin	Stewart–Haas Racing	Chevrolet	29.069	185.765
30	36	J. J. Yeley	Tommy Baldwin Racing	Chevrolet	29.124	185.414
31	13	Casey Mears	Germain Racing	Ford	29.277	184.445
32	40	Landon Cassill	Circle Sport	Chevrolet	29.283	184.407
33	83	David Reutimann	BK Racing	Toyota	29.288	184.376
34	35	Josh Wise	Front Row Motorsports	Ford	29.293	184.344
35	38	David Gilliland	Front Row Motorsports	Ford	29.331	184.106
36	51	Justin Allgaier	Phoenix Racing	Chevrolet	29.335	184.080
37	93	Travis Kvapil	BK Racing	Toyota	29.380	183.799
38	98	Michael McDowell	Phil Parsons Racing	Ford	29.455	183.331
39	32	Timmy Hill	FAS Lane Racing	Ford	29.458	183.312
40	95	Reed Sorenson	Leavine Family Racing	Ford	29.657	182.082
41	7	Dave Blaney	Tommy Baldwin Racing	Chevrolet	29.682	181.928
42	87	Joe Nemechek	NEMCO-Jay Robinson Racing	Toyota	29.875	180.753
43	33	Tony Raines	Circle Sport	Chevrolet	30.213	178.731
Qualifying Results

=== Race results ===
Pos	Car	Driver	Team	Manufacturer	Laps	Led	Points^{1}
1	20	Matt Kenseth	Joe Gibbs Racing	Toyota	267	89	48
2	18	Kyle Busch	Joe Gibbs Racing	Toyota	267	67	43
3	29	Kevin Harvick	Richard Childress Racing	Chevrolet	267	2	42
4	78	Kurt Busch	Furniture Row Racing	Chevrolet	267	0	40
5	48	Jimmie Johnson	Hendrick Motorsports	Chevrolet	267	40	40
6	24	Jeff Gordon	Hendrick Motorsports	Chevrolet	267	22	39
7	2	Brad Keselowski	Penske Racing	Ford	267	2	38
8	17	Ricky Stenhouse Jr.	Roush-Fenway Racing	Ford	267	0	36
9	15	Clint Bowyer	Michael Waltrip Racing	Toyota	267	0	35
10	39	Ryan Newman	Stewart–Haas Racing	Chevrolet	267	1	35
11	99	Carl Edwards	Roush Fenway Racing	Ford	267	1	34
12	5	Kasey Kahne	Hendrick Motorsports	Chevrolet	267	0	32
13	43	Aric Almirola	Richard Petty Motorsports	Ford	267	1	32
14	31	Jeff Burton	Richard Childress Racing	Chevrolet	267	0	30
15	9	Marcos Ambrose	Richard Petty Motorsports	Ford	267	0	29
16	16	Greg Biffle	Roush-Fenway Racing	Ford	267	2	29
17	14	Mark Martin	Stewart–Haas Racing	Chevrolet	267	0	27
18	56	Martin Truex Jr.	Michael Waltrip Racing	Toyota	267	0	26
19	1	Jamie McMurray	Earnhardt Ganassi Racing	Chevrolet	267	2	26
20	10	Danica Patrick	Stewart–Haas Racing	Chevrolet	267	0	24
21	47	A. J. Allmendinger	JTG Daugherty Racing	Toyota	267	0	23
22	27	Paul Menard	Richard Childress Racing	Chevrolet	267	0	22
23	7	Dave Blaney	Tommy Baldwin Racing	Chevrolet	267	0	21
24	93	Travis Kvapil	BK Racing	Toyota	266	0	20
25	36	J. J. Yeley	Tommy Baldwin Racing	Chevrolet	266	2	20
26	34	David Ragan	Front Row Motorsports	Ford	266	1	19
27	51	Justin Allgaier	Phoenix Racing	Chevrolet	266	0	0
28	38	David Gilliland	Front Row Motorsports	Ford	266	0	16
29	40	Landon Cassill	Circle Sport	Chevrolet	266	1	0
30	13	Casey Mears	Germain Racing	Ford	266	0	14
31	87	Joe Nemechek	NEMCO-Jay Robinson Racing	Toyota	266	0	0
32	42	Juan Pablo Montoya	Earnhardt Ganassi Racing	Chevrolet	261	0	12
33	11	Denny Hamlin	Joe Gibbs Racing	Toyota	247	0	11
34	32	Timmy Hill	FAS Lane Racing	Ford	225	0	10
35	88	Dale Earnhardt Jr.	Hendrick Motorsports	Chevrolet	224	2	10
36	83	David Reutimann	BK Racing	Toyota	195	0	8
37	22	Joey Logano	Penske Racing	Ford	175	32	8
38	55	Brian Vickers	Michael Waltrip Racing	Toyota	161	0	0
39	30	Cole Whitt	Swan Racing	Toyota	151	0	0
40	33	Tony Raines	Circle Sport	Chevrolet	87	0	0
41	35	Josh Wise	Front Row Motorsports	Ford	84	0	0
42	95	Reed Sorenson	Leavine Family Racing	Ford	68	0	0
43	98	Michael McDowell	Phil Parsons Racing	Ford	29	0	1
Race Results

Notes

^1 Points include 3 Chase for the Sprint Cup points for winning, 1 point for leading a lap, and 1 point for most laps led.

== Standings after the race ==
Drivers' Championship standings

	Pos	Driver	Points
	1	Matt Kenseth	2063
1	2	Kyle Busch	2055 (-8)
1	3	Jimmie Johnson	2052 (-11)
	4	Kevin Harvick	2048 (-15)
	5	Carl Edwards	2040 (-23)

Manufacturers' Championship standings

Pos	Manufacturer	Points
1	Chevrolet	184
2	Toyota	179 (-5)
3	Ford	143 (-41)

- Note: Only the first thirteen positions are included for the driver standings.

Previous race: 2013 Federated Auto Parts 400	Sprint Cup Series; 2013 season	Next race: 2013 Sylvania 300
