= NASCAR '14 =

2014 video game

NASCAR 14
- Cover art featuring Tony Stewart
- Developer: Eutechnyx
- Publisher: Deep Silver
- Series: NASCAR, NASCAR The Game
- Platforms: PlayStation 3, Xbox 360, Microsoft Windows
- Release: February 18, 2014
- Genres: Sports, Racing
- Modes: Single player, multiplayer

NASCAR '14 is a NASCAR video game. It is the third edition of the NASCAR The Game racing simulator series, and is the sequel to NASCAR The Game: Inside Line. Developed by Eutechnyx and published by Deep Silver, the game was released on February 18, 2014, for the PlayStation 3, Xbox 360, and PC.

== Cover vote ==
For the second straight game, Eutechnyx held a "drive for the cover" campaign, allowing fans to vote for the NASCAR driver they would like to see on the cover of NASCAR '14. Tony Stewart was chosen as the game's cover driver, succeeding Dale Earnhardt Jr.

== New features ==
New features for the game include online leagues, a server browser, DNFs, enhanced AI difficulty, the option to hire staff in career mode, and new car physics.

Driver rosters and paint schemes for the 2014 season were updated, with DLC being released every month. The game also features all 23 NASCAR Sprint Cup Series tracks.

== Reception ==
Reception

Aggregate score
Aggregator	Score
Metacritic	(X360) 65/100 (PS3) 67/100

Review scores
Publication	Score
Game Informer	7/10
GamesRadar+	3.5/5
Hardcore Gamer	3.5/5
Official Xbox Magazine (US)	55%
Push Square	7/10

The game has received mixed reviews. Jeremy Peeples of Hardcore Gamer gave the game a 3.5/5, saying that "there's a lot of fun to be had in the career mode tinkering with settings and getting things just right for a race, while the core racing action is quite exciting in any mode". Game Informer thought the game felt like a stopgap and that the franchise felt stagnant without the addition of any new major improvements to this new iteration. GamesRadar+ praised the deep career mode, polish, controls, and online leagues while criticizing vague career mode, easily wreckable cars, and the lack of a minor league career circuit.
