= NASCAR '15 =

2015 video game

- Cover art featuring Jeff Gordon
- Developer: Eutechnyx
- Publisher: Dusenberry Martin Racing
- Series: NASCAR The Game
- Platforms: PlayStation 3, Xbox 360, Windows
- Release: May 22, 2015
- Genre: Sim racing
- Modes: Single player, multiplayer

NASCAR '15 is a NASCAR video game, the fourth installment in the NASCAR The Game series and an update to the preceding NASCAR '14. Developed by Eutechnyx, and published by new NASCAR video game licensee Dusenberry Martin Racing, it is available on the seventh generation PlayStation 3, and Xbox 360 consoles as well as Windows. Physical copies of the console version were available at GameStop stores (EB Games in Canada), with digital downloads then-available on the PlayStation Network and Xbox Live. The PC version was available digitally on Steam.

This was the last NASCAR game for both the PlayStation 3 and Xbox 360.

== History ==
On January 1, 2015, HC2 Holdings, Inc. subsidiary Dusenberry Martin Racing (DMR) acquired the NASCAR video game licence as well as "certain NASCAR-related assets" from Eutechnyx. Dusenberry Martin Racing said that a 2015 update to NASCAR '14 would be released in May for the Xbox 360, PlayStation 3, and Windows PC, which had already been in development by Eutechnyx. Because it is an update, many features from previous NASCAR The Game installments are present. A 2016 version, NASCAR Heat Evolution, was developed by Dusenberry Martin Racing for the eighth generation consoles.

To promote the game, DMR signed several NASCAR drivers as "Game Ambassadors", including Erik Jones (as part of a promotion with GameStop), Joey Logano, Ryan Blaney, Bubba Wallace, and Matt Tifft. An updated version of the game called NASCAR '15: Victory Edition, which included all paint schemes and DLC and all patches, was released in October 2015, at no additional cost for those who purchased the original version of the game.

== Cover ==
The 2015 cover features four-time Sprint Cup Series champion Jeff Gordon, who was in his 23rd and final year running a full-time Sprint Cup schedule. He replaced Tony Stewart from the 2014 cover. The "Victory Edition" features 2015 Daytona 500 winner Joey Logano on the cover.

== Downloadable content ==
In addition to several patches to fix issues within the game, three DLC packs came to add more paint schemes to the game. The DLCs were released worldwide in mid to late-August 2015.

== NASCAR '15 Victory Edition ==
NASCAR '15 Victory Edition
- Cover art featuring Joey Logano
- Developer: Dusenberry Martin Racing
- Publisher: Dusenberry Martin Racing
- Series: NASCAR
- Platforms: PlayStation 3, Xbox 360, Microsoft Windows
- Release: October, 2015
- Genre: Sim racing
- Modes: Single player, multiplayer

NASCAR '15 Victory Edition is a NASCAR video game and a free update to the preceding NASCAR '15. Developed and published by new NASCAR video game licensee Dusenberry Martin Racing, it is available on the seventh generation PlayStation 3, and Xbox 360 consoles as well as Microsoft Windows. Physical copies of the console version were available at multiple retailers, with digital downloads then-available on the PlayStation Network and Xbox Live. Steam sold the game for the Windows PC.

=== Cover ===
The Victory Edition cover features 2015 Daytona 500 winner Joey Logano on the cover.

=== Features ===
Victory Edition is the first NASCAR game to feature alcohol sponsorship, with Brad Keselowski's Miller Lite branding appearing in the game for users verified to be over 21 years of age.

The game also featured an update for the 2016 season.
