= 2013 Federated Auto Parts 400 =

Auto race at Richmond in 2013

Race details
- Race 26 of 36 in the 2013 NASCAR Sprint Cup Series
- 2013 Federated Auto Parts 400 program cover
- Date: September 7, 2013
- Location: Richmond International Raceway; Richmond, Virginia, United States
- Course: Permanent racing facility
- Course length: 0.75 miles (1.2 km)
- Distance: 400 laps, 300 mi (482.803 km)
- Weather: Temperatures up to 81 °F (27 °C); wind speeds up to 8 miles per hour (13 km/h)

Pole position
Driver	Jeff Gordon	Hendrick Motorsports
- Time: 20.674 seconds

Most laps led
Driver	Brad Keselowski	Penske Racing
- Laps: 142

Winner
No. 99	Carl Edwards	Roush Fenway Racing

Television in the United States
- Network: ABC
- Announcers: Allen Bestwick, Dale Jarrett and Andy Petree

The 2013 Federated Auto Parts 400 was a NASCAR Sprint Cup Series race held on September 7, 2013, at Richmond International Raceway in Richmond, Virginia, United States. Contested over 400 laps, it was the twenty-sixth and final race leading into the Chase for the Sprint Cup in the 2013 Sprint Cup Series season. Carl Edwards of Roush Fenway Racing won the race, his second win of the season, while Kurt Busch finished second. Ryan Newman, Jamie McMurray, and Paul Menard rounded out the top five.

The race was the first for Harry Scott Jr. as a Sprint Cup Series team owner; Ryan Truex drove the #51 car in the team's debut.

The layout of Richmond International Raceway, the venue where the race was held.

The race was marred by a controversial finish, after evidence surfaced that two teams were found to have manipulated the outcome of the race and Chase positions in the final ten laps. NASCAR ultimately determined that Michael Waltrip Racing, Penske Racing, and Front Row Motorsports were involved in two separate, but intertwined, incidents, first by Clint Bowyer intentionally causing a caution with less than ten laps remaining in the race, and on the ensuing restart, having Brian Vickers pit after a restart from caution so that Martin Truex Jr. would clinch a Wildcard berth over Ryan Newman, and the second was collusion where Penske's Joey Logano earned the final guaranteed berth over Jeff Gordon after passing Front Row's David Gilliland. Both situations were intertwined together because of the tenth place and wild card situation. This scandal became widely known amongst fans and journalists as Spingate.

== Entry list ==
Car	Driver	Make	Team
1	Jamie McMurray	Chevrolet	Earnhardt Ganassi Racing
2	Brad Keselowski	Ford	Penske Racing
5	Kasey Kahne	Chevrolet	Hendrick Motorsports
7	Dave Blaney	Chevrolet	Tommy Baldwin Racing
9	Marcos Ambrose	Ford	Richard Petty Motorsports
10	Danica Patrick	Chevrolet	Stewart–Haas Racing
11	Denny Hamlin	Toyota	Joe Gibbs Racing
13	Casey Mears	Ford	Germain Racing
14	Mark Martin	Chevrolet	Stewart–Haas Racing
15	Clint Bowyer	Toyota	Michael Waltrip Racing
16	Greg Biffle	Ford	Roush Fenway Racing
17	Ricky Stenhouse Jr.	Ford	Roush Fenway Racing
18	Kyle Busch	Toyota	Joe Gibbs Racing
19	Mike Bliss	Toyota	Humphrey Smith Racing
20	Matt Kenseth	Toyota	Joe Gibbs Racing
22	Joey Logano	Ford	Penske Racing
24	Jeff Gordon	Chevrolet	Hendrick Motorsports
27	Paul Menard	Chevrolet	Richard Childress Racing
29	Kevin Harvick	Chevrolet	Richard Childress Racing
30	David Stremme	Toyota	Swan Racing
31	Jeff Burton	Chevrolet	Richard Childress Racing
32	Ken Schrader	Ford	FAS Lane Racing
33	Tony Raines	Chevrolet	Circle Sport
34	David Ragan	Ford	Front Row Motorsports
35	Josh Wise	Ford	Front Row Motorsports
36	J.J. Yeley	Chevrolet	Tommy Baldwin Racing
38	David Gilliland	Ford	Front Row Motorsports
39	Ryan Newman	Chevrolet	Stewart–Haas Racing
40	Landon Cassill	Chevrolet	Circle Sport
42	Juan Pablo Montoya	Chevrolet	Earnhardt Ganassi Racing
43	Aric Almirola	Ford	Richard Petty Motorsports
47	A.J. Allmendinger	Toyota	JTG Daugherty Racing
48	Jimmie Johnson	Chevrolet	Hendrick Motorsports
51	Ryan Truex	Chevrolet	HScott Motorsports
55	Brian Vickers	Toyota	Michael Waltrip Racing
56	Martin Truex Jr.	Toyota	Michael Waltrip Racing
78	Kurt Busch	Chevrolet	Furniture Row Racing
83	David Reutimann	Toyota	BK Racing
87	Joe Nemechek	Toyota	NEMCO-Jay Robinson Racing
88	Dale Earnhardt Jr.	Chevrolet	Hendrick Motorsports
93	Travis Kvapil	Toyota	BK Racing
95	Reed Sorenson	Ford	Leavine Family Racing
98	Michael McDowell	Ford	Phil Parsons Racing
99	Carl Edwards	Ford	Roush Fenway Racing

== Results ==
=== Qualifying ===
Pos	No.	Driver	Team	Make	Speed	Time
1	24	Jeff Gordon	Hendrick Motorsports	Chevrolet	130.599	20.674
2	78	Kurt Busch	Furniture Row Racing	Chevrolet	130.334	20.716
3	2	Brad Keselowski	Penske Racing	Ford	130.158	20.744
4	15	Clint Bowyer	Michael Waltrip Racing	Toyota	130.020	20.766
5	20	Matt Kenseth	Joe Gibbs Racing	Toyota	129.864	20.791
6	11	Denny Hamlin	Joe Gibbs Racing	Toyota	129.851	20.793
7	1	Jamie McMurray	Earnhardt Ganassi Racing	Chevrolet	129.689	20.819
8	22	Joey Logano	Penske Racing	Ford	129.633	20.828
9	16	Greg Biffle	Roush Fenway Racing	Ford	129.366	20.871
10	48	Regan Smith	Hendrick Motorsports	Chevrolet	129.286	20.884
11	56	Martin Truex Jr.	Michael Waltrip Racing	Toyota	129.224	20.894
12	42	Juan Pablo Montoya	Earnhardt Ganassi Racing	Chevrolet	129.125	20.910
13	18	Kyle Busch	Joe Gibbs Racing	Toyota	129.119	20.911
14	88	Dale Earnhardt Jr.	Hendrick Motorsports	Chevrolet	129.069	20.919
15	43	Aric Almirola	Richard Petty Motorsports	Ford	129.057	20.921
16	14	Mark Martin	Stewart–Haas Racing	Chevrolet	129.026	20.926
17	29	Kevin Harvick	Richard Childress Racing	Chevrolet	128.995	20.931
18	5	Kasey Kahne	Hendrick Motorsports	Chevrolet	128.946	20.939
19	31	Jeff Burton	Richard Childress Racing	Chevrolet	128.817	20.960
20	55	Brian Vickers	Michael Waltrip Racing	Toyota	128.743	20.972
21	17	Ricky Stenhouse Jr.	Roush Fenway Racing	Ford	128.584	20.998
22	27	Paul Menard	Richard Childress Racing	Chevrolet	128.559	21.002
23	34	David Ragan	Front Row Motorsports	Ford	128.486	21.014
24	39	Ryan Newman	Stewart–Haas Racing	Chevrolet	128.382	21.031
25	13	Casey Mears	Germain Racing	Ford	128.351	21.036
26	99	Carl Edwards	Roush Fenway Racing	Ford	128.290	21.046
27	35	Josh Wise	Front Row Motorsports	Ford	128.272	21.049
28	40	Landon Cassill	Circle Sport	Chevrolet	128.254	21.052
29	30	David Stremme	Swan Racing	Toyota	128.077	21.081
30	98	Michael McDowell	Phil Parsons Racing	Ford	128.047	21.086
31	87	Joe Nemechek	NEMCO-Jay Robinson Racing	Toyota	127.847	21.119
32	9	Marcos Ambrose	Richard Petty Motorsports	Ford	127.799	21.127
33	93	Travis Kvapil	BK Racing	Toyota	127.690	21.145
34	47	A. J. Allmendinger	JTG Daugherty Racing	Toyota	127.527	21.172
35	83	David Reutimann	BK Racing	Toyota	127.401	21.193
36	10	Danica Patrick	Stewart–Haas Racing	Chevrolet	127.286	21.212
37	38	David Gilliland	Front Row Motorsports	Ford	127.250	21.218
38	51	Ryan Truex	HScott Motorsports	Chevrolet	127.095	21.244
39	95	Reed Sorenson	Leavine Family Racing	Ford	126.630	21.322
40	7	Dave Blaney	Tommy Baldwin Racing	Chevrolet	126.399	21.361
41	33	Tony Raines	Circle Sport	Chevrolet	126.139	21.405
42	32	Ken Schrader	FAS Lane Racing	Ford	125.874	21.450
43	36	J. J. Yeley	Tommy Baldwin Racing	Chevrolet	125.774	21.467
Failed to Qualify
44	19	Mike Bliss	Humphrey Smith Racing	Toyota	127.208	21.225
Qualifying Results
^{1} Regan Smith drove the No. 48 car for practice and qualifying; Jimmie Johnson was on paternity leave.

=== Race ===
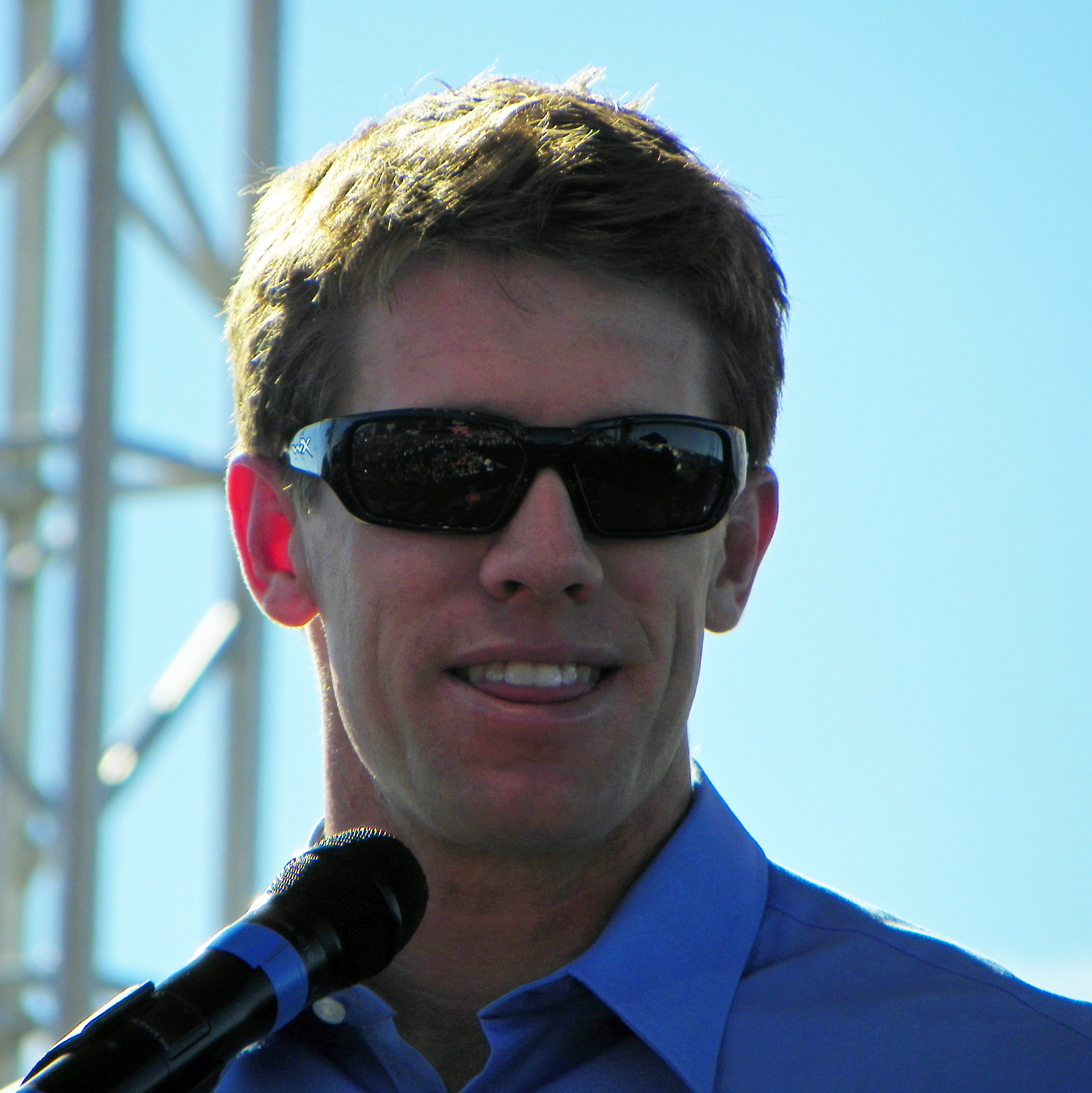
Carl Edwards won the race.

Pos	No.	Driver	Team	Make	Laps	Race Status	Led	Points
1	99	Carl Edwards	Roush Fenway Racing	Ford	400	Running	46	47
2	78	Kurt Busch	Furniture Row Racing	Chevrolet	400	Running	73	43
3	39	Ryan Newman	Stewart–Haas Racing	Chevrolet	400	Running	4	42
4	1	Jamie McMurray	Earnhardt Ganassi Racing	Chevrolet	400	Running	6	41
5	27	Paul Menard	Richard Childress Racing	Chevrolet	400	Running	3	40
6	20	Matt Kenseth	Joe Gibbs Racing	Toyota	400	Running	5	39
7	56	Martin Truex Jr.	Michael Waltrip Racing	Toyota	400	Running	0	37
8	24	Jeff Gordon	Hendrick Motorsports	Chevrolet	400	Running	49	37
9	14	Mark Martin	Stewart–Haas Racing	Chevrolet	400	Running	0	35
10	17	Ricky Stenhouse Jr.	Roush Fenway Racing	Ford	400	Running	0	34
11	29	Kevin Harvick	Richard Childress Racing	Chevrolet	400	Running	0	33
12	16	Greg Biffle	Roush Fenway Racing	Ford	400	Running	0	32
13	88	Dale Earnhardt Jr.	Hendrick Motorsports	Chevrolet	400	Running	0	31
14	5	Kasey Kahne	Hendrick Motorsports	Chevrolet	400	Running	0	30
15	47	A. J. Allmendinger	JTG Daugherty Racing	Toyota	400	Running	0	29
16	42	Juan Pablo Montoya	Earnhardt Ganassi Racing	Chevrolet	400	Running	0	28
17	2	Brad Keselowski	Penske Racing	Ford	400	Running	142	29
18	31	Jeff Burton	Richard Childress Racing	Chevrolet	400	Running	0	26
19	18	Kyle Busch	Joe Gibbs Racing	Toyota	400	Running	0	25
20	43	Aric Almirola	Richard Petty Motorsports	Ford	400	Running	0	24
21	11	Denny Hamlin	Joe Gibbs Racing	Toyota	399	Running	0	23
22	22	Joey Logano	Penske Racing	Ford	399	Running	0	22
23	38	David Gilliland	Front Row Motorsports	Ford	399	Running	0	21
24	55	Brian Vickers	Michael Waltrip Racing	Toyota	399	Running	0	0
25	15	Clint Bowyer	Michael Waltrip Racing	Toyota	398	Running	72	20
26	13	Casey Mears	Germain Racing	Ford	397	Running	0	18
27	9	Marcos Ambrose	Richard Petty Motorsports	Ford	397	Running	0	17
28	93	Travis Kvapil	BK Racing	Toyota	397	Running	0	16
29	34	David Ragan	Front Row Motorsports	Ford	397	Running	0	15
30	10	Danica Patrick	Stewart–Haas Racing	Chevrolet	396	Running	0	14
31	7	Dave Blaney	Tommy Baldwin Racing	Chevrolet	396	Running	0	13
32	83	David Reutimann	BK Racing	Toyota	395	Running	0	12
33	33	Tony Raines	Circle Sport	Chevrolet	395	Running	0	0
34	40	Landon Cassill	Circle Sport	Chevrolet	395	Running	0	0
35	51	Ryan Truex	HScott Motorsports	Chevrolet	395	Running	0	0
36	36	J. J. Yeley	Tommy Baldwin Racing	Chevrolet	393	Running	0	8
37	32	Ken Schrader	FAS Lane Racing	Ford	393	Running	0	7
38	30	David Stremme	Swan Racing	Toyota	391	Running	0	6
39	87	Joe Nemechek	NEMCO-Jay Robinson Racing	Toyota	388	Running	0	0
40	48	Jimmie Johnson	Hendrick Motorsports	Chevrolet	372	Running	0	4
41	35	Josh Wise	Front Row Motorsports	Ford	142	Vibration	0	0
42	95	Reed Sorenson	Leavine Family Racing	Ford	126	Brakes	0	0
43	98	Michael McDowell	Phil Parsons Racing	Ford	76	Brakes	0	1
Race Results

=== Final Chase for the Cup statistics ===
Driver's points
(post-race) - Sunday, September 8						(post-penalties) - Friday, September 13					
Pos	Driver	Points	Wins	Top 5	Top 10	Pos	Driver	Points	Wins	Top 5	Top 10
1	Matt Kenseth	2015	5	6	13	1	Matt Kenseth	2015	5	6	13
2	Jimmie Johnson	2012	4	9	15	2	Jimmie Johnson	2012	4	9	15
3	Kyle Busch	2012	4	11	15	3	Kyle Busch	2012	4	11	15
4	Kevin Harvick	2006	2	6	13	4	Kevin Harvick	2006	2	6	13
5	Carl Edwards	2006	2	8	13	5	Carl Edwards	2006	2	8	13
6	Joey Logano	2003	1	8	14	6	Joey Logano	2003	1	8	14
7	Greg Biffle	2003	1	3	10	7	Greg Biffle	2003	1	3	10
8	Clint Bowyer	2000	0	8	13	8	Clint Bowyer	2000	0	8	13
9	Dale Earnhardt Jr.	2000	0	5	14	9	Dale Earnhardt Jr.	2000	0	5	14
10	Kurt Busch	2000	0	8	13	10	Kurt Busch	2000	0	8	13
11	Kasey Kahne	2000	2	8	11	11	Kasey Kahne	2000	2	8	11
12	Martin Truex Jr.	2000	1	6	11	12	Ryan Newman	2000	1	6	12
13						13	Jeff Gordon	2000	0	5	12

(see below)

== Race manipulation controversy ==
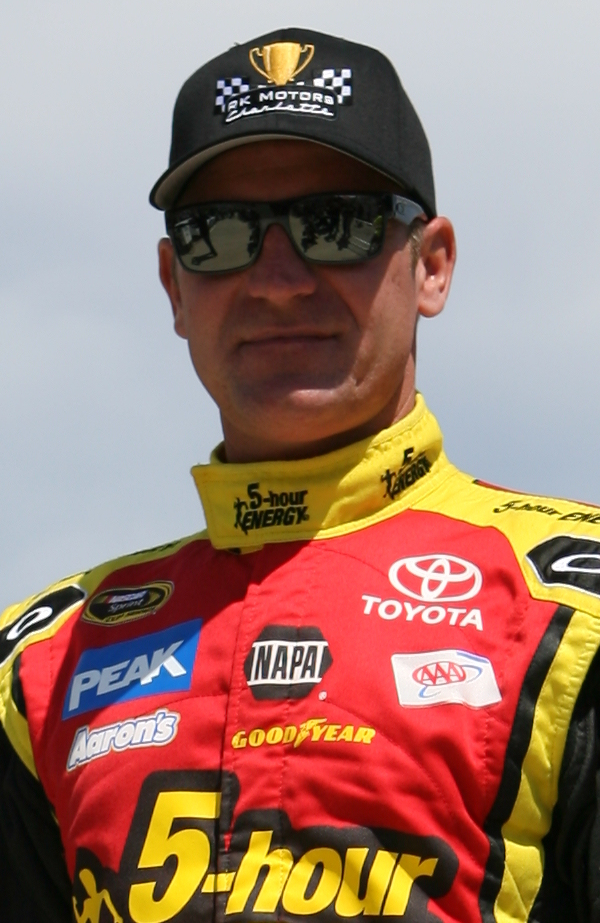
Clint Bowyer was accused of intentionally spinning his car to help Martin Truex Jr. make the Chase.

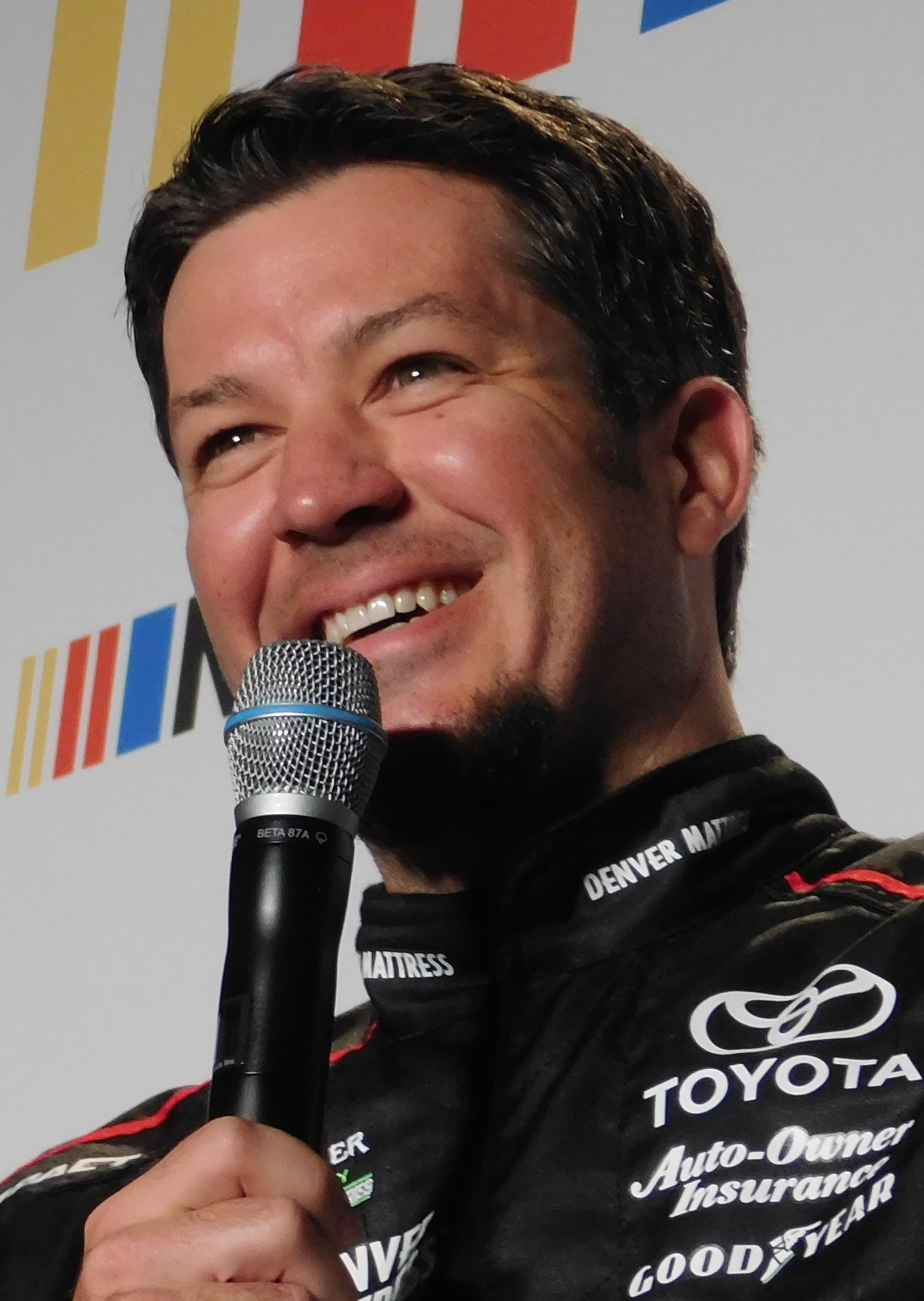
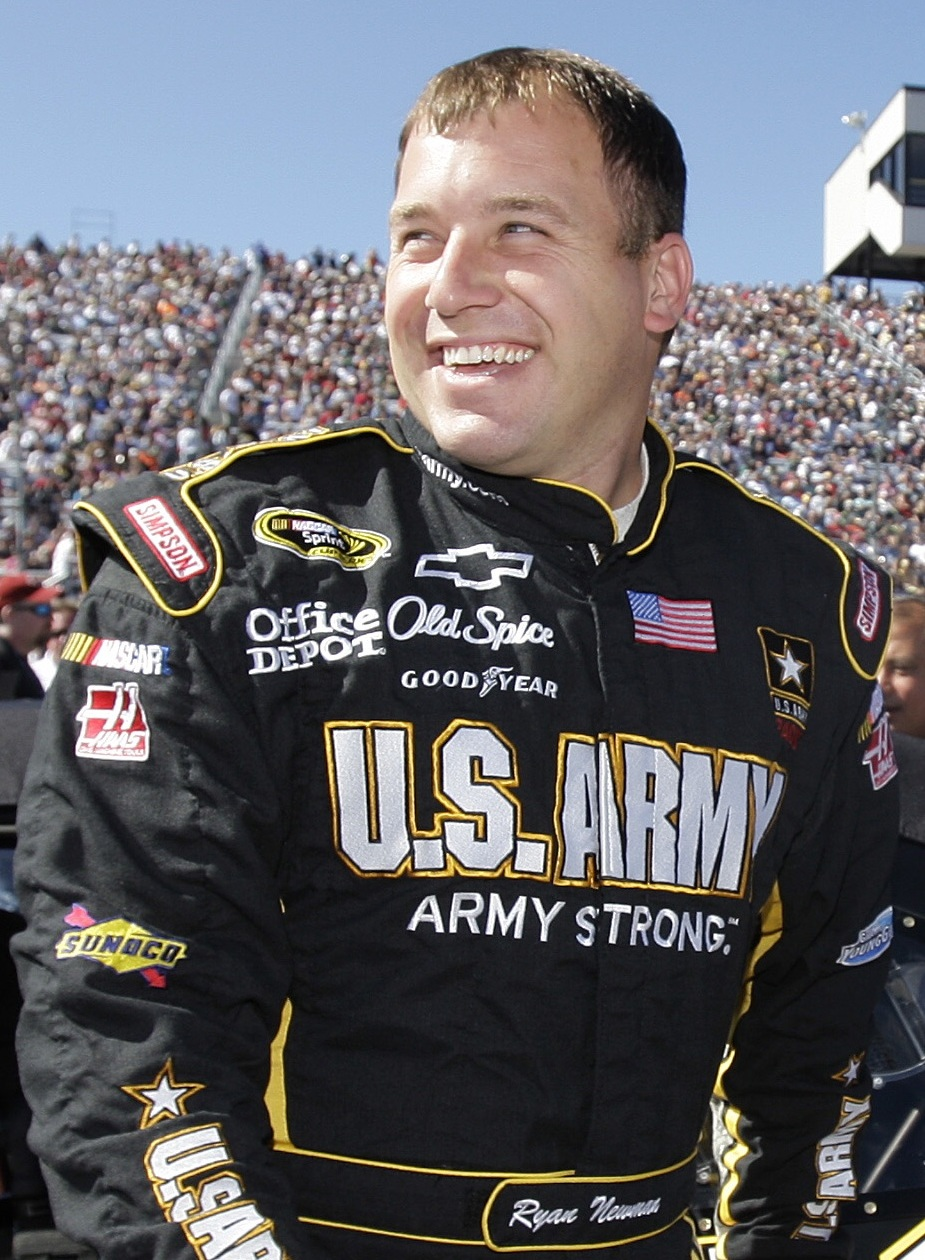
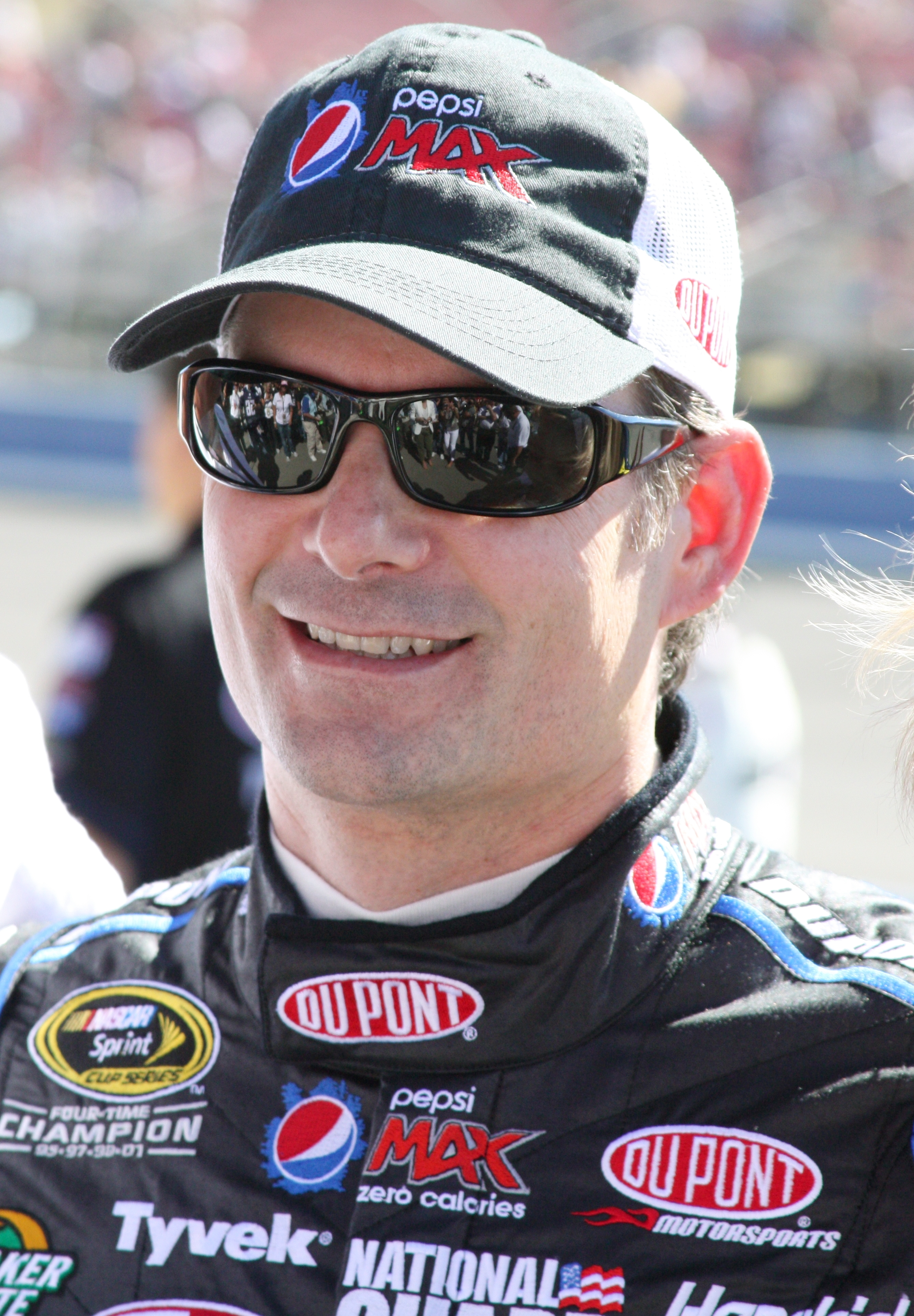
Martin Truex Jr. was docked 50 driver points after the race, losing his Chase spot to Ryan Newman as a result. Jeff Gordon was later given a thirteenth spot in the Chase.

Team orders became an issue during the last ten laps of the race, and it was ultimately determined that three teams had tried to manipulate the finish of the race and Chase positions.

Under the Chase system at the time, 12 drivers were eligible to make the Chase: the top 10 in points, with two additional Wild Card spots for drivers positioned 11th-20th in the points with race wins. Entering the race, Kasey Kahne had already locked up the first Wild Card spot as he was the only repeat winner in the field outside of the top 10 in points, with his two race wins from earlier in the year at Bristol and Pocono. Ryan Newman entered the race trailing Martin Truex Jr. for the final wild card. In order to guarantee a Chase position, Newman needed to either win the race, or be five points ahead of Truex and not have Joey Logano or Greg Biffle fall out of the top ten (as if either Logano or Biffle dropped out of the top ten at the end of the race, the other Wild Card spot would go to one of them). Jeff Gordon trailed Logano by 16 points for 10th place, the final Chase spot based on points position.

On Lap 393, Gordon was ahead of Logano by a large enough margin that Gordon led Logano by two points for the final guaranteed Chase position. Newman was the leader, and would have bumped out both Logano and Truex (one win each) had the race ended at that point. It was on that lap that Truex's teammate Clint Bowyer spun out in Turn 4. From the various angles captured of the spin, it initially appeared that Bowyer had either been tapped from behind by Dale Earnhardt Jr. or he had cut a right front tire. The field pitted under the resulting caution flag, including Bowyer, Truex's other teammate Brian Vickers, Newman and the rest of the field. A slow pit stop for Newman dropped him to third, behind Carl Edwards, Paul Menard, with Kurt Busch starting next to him in 4th.

As a result of pit stops, Truex gained multiple positions. Logano, who was two laps behind the leader (while Gordon was on the lead lap), used a wavearound to move up to one lap behind the leaders, where he could race other cars one lap behind in an attempt to gain more positions and score enough points to retake Gordon. Edwards went on to win, albeit with controversy as it appeared he jumped Menard on the restart, with Kurt Busch and Newman finishing behind Edwards. However, Edwards was not penalized (as had happened to Jimmie Johnson at Dover in June) as NASCAR ruled that Menard had spun his tires and was slow getting up to speed.

Newman and Truex finished tied for the final wildcard spot on both wins, and the first tie-breaker, points. However, since Truex had an extra second-place finish at Texas, he entered the Chase. Logano, who overtook Gordon on the final restart, clinched the final non-wild card spot by one point over Gordon.

Immediately after the race, many in the garage suspected that Bowyer had spun out deliberately in an attempt to manipulate the finish of the race so that Truex would gain a Chase spot. The incident drew comparisons to the 2008 SingTel Singapore Grand Prix Formula One race, where Nelson Piquet Jr. intentionally caused a caution to give an advantage to teammate Fernando Alonso, who would win the race. Coincidentally, Piquet was entered in the second-tier Nationwide Series race that weekend. Dale Earnhardt Jr. was directly behind Bowyer at the moment of the spin, and said afterwards that the way Bowyer's car spun was "one of the craziest things [he's] ever seen", and noticed the car being "jerked around" to make it lose control out of turn 4. While Bowyer claimed it was a flat tire that caused him to spin out, and indeed the right front was down after the spin, it was noted that the behavior of Bowyer's car was inconsistent with the normal behavior of a car that had cut a tire: the normal behavior for a car cutting a tire in the corners being for the car to wash up the track with no steering and slam the outside wall with its right side, then come back down onto the track, rather than spinning onto the apron. In addition, the popping noise normally associated with a flat tire only happened after the spin.

Further suspicion arose during the video replays, as the radio communications between Bowyer and crew chief Brian Pattie showed they were openly worried about the possibility of Newman winning and eliminating Truex from the Chase on lap 391, two laps before Bowyer spun. Another suspicious conversation was revealed between Vickers and his spotter, team general manager and vice president Ty Norris, where Norris ordered a completely oblivious Vickers to make a green-flag pit stop after the restart on lap 398 in order to give Truex another position to tie Newman in points. These conversations seemed to provide evidence of some kind of manipulation going on via team orders. In order for the scheme to work, Gordon, who was in 10th place, had to be overtaken by Logano in order to guarantee Truex a wild card. This scandal became known as Spingate from Bowyer's late-race spin, but also the Singapore Sling because the incident was similar to the 2008 Singapore Formula One incident to manipulate the outcome of the race.

On Monday, September 9, NASCAR penalized Michael Waltrip Racing by fining the team $300,000—the highest fine imposed on a team in NASCAR's 67-year history. It also indefinitely suspended Norris, placed all three of MWR crew chiefs on probation until December 31, and docked Bowyer and Truex 50 driver points (While Vickers, a Nationwide Series regular, was not eligible for Sprint Cup driver points under the series declaration rule, he was also docked 50 points, which was reflected in a negative points total at year's end). Each car was also docked 50 owner's points (Waltrip for the #55 and #56, Rob Kauffman for the #15; even if a driver is not a Cup-declared driver, the owner earns points). As this penalty was applied before the reset for the Chase, it effectively knocked Truex out of the Wildcard spot in favor of Newman. The 50-point penalty dropped Truex to 17th in points, removing him from eligibility for a wild-card position, and giving his spot to Newman. While NASCAR could not find any conclusive evidence that Bowyer had deliberately spun out, it did determine that Vickers' pit on Norris' orders was illegal. The point deduction did not affect Bowyer's post-seeding, as all penalties affected his pre-Chase points total and he had clinched a Chase berth two races earlier. Gordon, meanwhile, remained eliminated from the Chase because he did not have the necessary points to leapfrog Logano for a spot, which drew even more controversy, since Logano was able to overtake Gordon in the ensuing restart after the caution. Logano had to stay in the top ten in order to give Truex a wild card if Newman did not win. Had the caution not occurred, Gordon would likely have clinched a Chase position, since Logano would have remained two laps down.

Shortly after the penalties against Michael Waltrip Racing for trying to manipulate the race, rumors surfaced that Logano had received assistance from Front Row Motorsports driver David Gilliland. Penske and Front Row were considered technical partners, as they both used Ford cars and Roush Fenway Racing powertrains. Radio communications seemed to suggest to NASCAR that Front Row officials asked Gilliland to slow down and give up a position to Logano in order to help Logano race his way into the Chase, in exchange for an undisclosed form of compensation. Logano passed Gilliland on the final restart.

After a second inquiry, NASCAR placed both Penske and Front Row on probation until December 31, and forced all teams to attend a Saturday afternoon meeting at the 2013 GEICO 400 in Chicagoland, regarding ethics in light of the two related match fixing incidents. Additionally, NASCAR CEO Brian France announced that Gordon would be added to the Chase field, expanding the field to 13 drivers. France explained in a press conference that his decision to add Gordon to the Chase was "based on the totality of events that were outside" Gordon's control, and how MWR's and Penske's manipulation attempts gave Gordon an "unfair disadvantage", and the fact that if Bowyer had not spun and the caution had not come out at any point between lap 393 and the white flag, Gordon would have qualified for the Chase on points based on his running position.

=== Aftermath ===
NAPA Auto Parts, Truex's primary sponsor on the #56 car, announced on September 19, 2013, that they would revoke sponsorship of MWR at the end of the season as a direct result of the incident, choosing instead to align with Hendrick Motorsports and Dale Earnhardt Jr. for the 2014 season. In 2014, NAPA would partner with Earnhardt's Nationwide Series team JR Motorsports and became the primary sponsor for up-and-coming driver Chase Elliott's 2014 championship and rookie of the year run in the Nationwide Series. They also sponsored Elliott for his part-time Sprint Cup debut in 2015, with a partial run set for his championship debut in 2016 after Elliott was moved to the No. 24 full-time following Jeff Gordon's retirement from racing, with Axalta moving over to sponsor Earnhardt from 2016 to 2017 and then Alex Bowman and William Byron, starting in 2018; Elliott would eventually win his first Cup Series title (with NAPA sponsorship) in 2020 (by which point Elliott's car had been renumbered to 9). With the loss of NAPA sponsorship, MWR had to scale the #56 team down to a part-time team for 2014, while Truex and everyone on his pit crew ended up being signed by Furniture Row Racing to replace a departing Kurt Busch. Truex would win the 2017 Monster Energy NASCAR Cup Series Championship for Furniture Row.

Michael Waltrip Racing continued to run as a two-car operation for 2014 and 2015 but never again saw victory lane. Team principal Rob Kauffman announced he was purchasing a stake in Chip Ganassi Racing in 2015 and MWR folded at the end of the season; the team's charters (as a founding member of Race Team Alliance) were given to Stewart–Haas Racing and fellow Toyota team Joe Gibbs Racing, allowing both to receive one extra car under the then-new charter system. Bowyer would take 5-Hour Energy to HScott Motorsports for 2016. In 2017, Bowyer moved to drive the 14 for Stewart–Haas Racing in 2017, replacing retired team owner, Tony Stewart. 5-Hour Energy would move to Furniture Row to sponsor Erik Jones and Truex, before also withdrawing from the sport in 2018.

NASCAR would be rocked by another race manipulation scandal six years later, involving backmarker teams during that year's season finale, the 2019 Ford EcoBoost 400, involving bonuses for the best team without a Race Team Alliance charter (a system introduced in 2016) in that year's owner point standings.

The record fine, $300,000, was broken in 2023, when all four Hendrick Motorsports cars were discovered to have irregularities on the louvers during the pre-race inspection for the 2023 United Rentals Work United 500 (along with Justin Haley's, belonging to Kaulig Racing); Hendrick Motorsports were fined $400,000 for the irregularities ($100,000 per car).

Previous race: 2013 AdvoCare 500	Sprint Cup Series; 2013 season	Next race: 2013 GEICO 400
