= The Chase (NASCAR) =

Series of races to determine the yearly champion

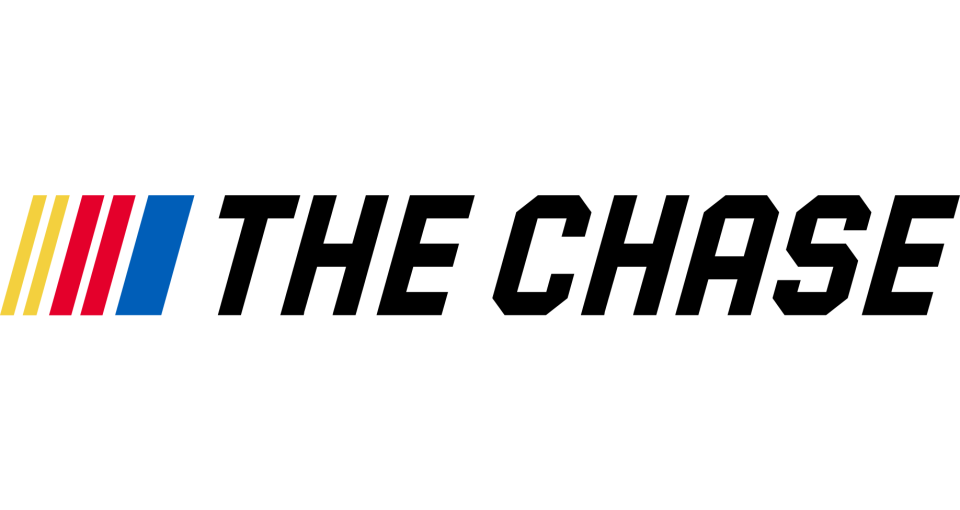

Tournament information
- Sport: Auto racing
- Established: 2004 (NASCAR Cup Series); 2016 (NASCAR O'Reilly Auto Parts Series); 2016 (NASCAR Craftsman Truck Series)
- Administrator: Steve O'Donnell
- Tournament format: Championship playoff system
- Host: NASCAR
- Teams: NASCAR Cup Series; NASCAR O'Reilly Auto Parts Series; NASCAR Craftsman Truck Series

The Chase, formerly known as the Chase for the Nextel Cup (from 2004 to 2007), the Chase for the Sprint Cup (from 2008 to 2016) and the NASCAR Playoffs (from 2017 to 2025), is NASCAR's championship playoff system used in its three national series. The system was founded as The Chase for the Championship on January 21, 2004, and was used exclusively in the NASCAR Cup Series from 2004 to 2015. Since 2016, NASCAR has also used the playoff system in the O'Reilly Auto Parts Series and Craftsman Truck Series.

The NASCAR Cup Series version of the playoff system is often called the Chase for the Cup based on its former official name, and includes sixteen drivers that compete for the championship in the final ten races of the Cup Series. The O'Reilly Auto Parts Series Chase format is competed over nine races with twelve drivers and the Truck Series Chase is seven races long, with ten drivers.

In 2017, the Chase was rebranded as the "playoffs.” In 2017, NASCAR began awarding a regular season championship for the driver with the most points heading into the playoffs in all three series. In 2026, the Playoffs would go back to being called "The Chase" as part of a format revamp.

== Origins of the Chase ==
The publicly stated purpose for the NASCAR playoff system was to make the NASCAR mid-season more competitive, and increase fan interest and television ratings. The timing of the start of the playoff coincides with the commencement of the college and National Football League seasons and the final month of Major League Baseball's regular season and playoffs. Prior to this format, the Cup champion was sometimes determined mathematically prior to the season finale, a situation that continued to exist in the lower national series, the O'Reilly Auto Parts Series and Craftsman Truck Series, until they received their own playoff formats in 2016.

By resetting and compressing the scoring of the top 10 (later 12, then 16) drivers, the chances of each of those drivers winning the championship was increased, while not precluding anyone with a legitimate chance of winning. The original choice of top 10 drivers was based on the historical analysis that no driver outside the top 10, with 10 races remaining in the season, had ever gone on to win the Championship. The expansion to top 16 in 2014 made the elimination rounds possible.

Short track racing, the grassroots of NASCAR, began experimenting with ideas to help the entry-level racer. In 2001, the United Speed Alliance Racing organization, sanctioning body of the USAR Hooters Pro Cup Series, a short-track stock car touring series, devised a five-race system where the top teams in their Hooters ProCup North and Hooters ProCup South divisions would participate in a five-race playoff, the Four Champions, named for the four Hooters Racing staff members (including 1992 NASCAR Winston Cup Series champion and pilot Alan Kulwicki) killed in an April 1, 1993 plane crash in Blountville, Tennessee. The system organized the teams with starting points based on the team's performance in their division (division champions earn a bonus), and the teams would participate in a five-race playoff. The five races, added to the team's seeding points, would determine the winner. The 2001 version was four races, as one was canceled because of the September 11 terrorist attacks, however, NASCAR watched as the ProCup's Four Champions became a success and drivers from the series began looking at NASCAR rides. The idea was to give NASCAR, which was becoming in many areas the fourth-largest sport (after Major League Baseball, the NFL, the NBA and surpassing in some regions the NHL) attention during baseball's road to the World Series and the outset of the pro and college football, NHL, and NBA seasons.

=== "The Matt Kenseth rule" ===
The playoff system has been referred to as "the Matt Kenseth Rule" as a result of Kenseth's championship in 2003, the year prior to NASCAR adopting the playoff system. In 2003, Kenseth won the championship with just one race win (the third race of the year, at Las Vegas Motor Speedway) along with 25 top-ten finishes with him leading the championship for 33 races throughout the season, . Ryan Newman won eight races that year (22% of the 36 races run in 2003), but failed to finish several races due to crashes and ended the season sixth in the drivers' championship. NASCAR indicated that the 2003 championship outcome was not the driving factor in establishing the playoffs, as they had been considering adjustments to the points system to put more emphasis on winning races since 2000. "The Matt Kenseth Rule" more properly refers to the NASCAR numerical scoring system that was also implemented for the 2004 season, which increased the points awarded to race winners, thus emphasizing winning more and consistency less than in previous years. However, the coincidence of new playoff system in 2004 and Kenseth's 2003 championship led to the issues being linked, including by NASCAR officials in interviews and press releases.

== Cup Series ==
The playoffs system was announced on January 21, 2004, as the "Chase for the Championship,” and first used during the 2004 Nextel Cup season. The format used from 2004 to 2006 was modified slightly starting with the 2007 season. A major change to the qualifying criteria was instituted in 2011, along with a major change to the points system. Even more radical changes to the qualifying criteria, and to the format of the playoffs itself, were announced for the 2014 Sprint Cup Series. As of 2014, the 10-race playoff format involved 16 drivers chosen primarily on wins during the "regular season,” if fewer than 16 drivers won races during the regular season, the remaining field was filled on the basis of regular season points. These drivers competed against each other while racing in the standard field of 40 cars. The driver with the most points after the final 10 races was declared the champion.

Beginning with the 2008 Sprint Cup Series, the playoffs became known by its new name as a result of the merger of Nextel Communications with Sprint Corporation. From 2004 to 2006, some races aired on TNT, with the rest airing on NBC. From 2007 to 2009, all 10 races aired on ABC, but in 2010, NASCAR and ESPN quietly moved 9 of the 10 races to ESPN. In 2015, coverage returned to NBC with some races airing on NBCSN.

=== Seeding and scoring history ===
The current version of the playoff system was announced by NASCAR chairman and CEO Brian France on January 23, 2017. The current format is the fifth since it was introduced for the 2004 season, with significant changes made in both 2007 and 2011. The 2017 change is the 15th time since 1949 that the point system had been changed, these latest changes affect both the race format and the playoff seeding.

==== 2004–2006 ====
Starting in the 2004 season, after the first 26 races of the season, all drivers in the Top 10 and any others within 400 points of the leader earned a berth in the chase. All drivers in the chase had their point total adjusted. The first-place driver in the standings began the chase with 5,050 points, the second-place driver started with 5,045, etc. Incremental five-point drops continued through the list of title contenders.

==== 2007–2010 ====
In 2007, NASCAR expanded the field of contenders to the top 12 drivers in the points standings after the first 26 races. Each drivers' point total reset to 5,000 points, with a ten-point bonus for each race won. The provision admitting all drivers within 400 points of the leader into the chase was dropped. Brian France explained why NASCAR made the changes to the chase:

"The adjustments taken [Monday] put a greater emphasis on winning races. Winning is what this sport is all about. Nobody likes to see drivers content to finish in the top 10. We want our sport – especially during the Chase – to be more about winning."

==== 2011–2013 ====
The chase format was again modified for the 2011 season, as was the point system for winnings. After 26 "regular season" races, the top 10 drivers, as determined by points accumulated during the season, automatically advance to contend for the Cup championship. These drivers were joined by two "wild card" qualifiers, specifically the two drivers ranked from 11th through 20th in drivers' points who have the most regular-season race wins. The 12 drivers' championship points were reset to a base of 2,000 per driver. Each of the 10 automatic qualifiers received a bonus of 3 points for each win during the regular season, while the two wild card qualifiers received no bonus. Normal scoring applied during the chase, with race winners earning 43 base points plus 3 bonus points, all drivers who lead a lap earning 1 bonus point, and the driver who led the most laps earning 1 bonus point in addition to any other points earned.

As in all previous chases, the driver with the highest point total at the conclusion of the 10-race chase was the NASCAR Cup Series champion.

The chase field consisted of 12 drivers from 2007 through 2012. An exception to this rule was in 2013, where the chase field was expanded to 13 drivers for that season only as the result of a match fixing scandal. With seven laps remaining in the Federated Auto Parts 400 at Richmond International Raceway, Clint Bowyer went into a spin, forcing a caution. After the race, rumors abounded that Bowyer had deliberately forced a caution in an attempt to manipulate the finish of the race so as to help his Michael Waltrip Racing (MWR) teammate Martin Truex Jr. clinch the second of the two wild card spots (Kasey Kahne had already clinched the first spot) over Ryan Newman, who had been leading at the moment of caution. That Bowyer's spin had been deliberate had been further suggested by several things: the first was radio communications on Brian Vickers' team with his spotter, MWR general manager Ty Norris, telling him to pit under green on the restart, and that the audio on Bowyer's radio showed crew chief Brian Pattie pointing out Newman taking the lead and then asking a suspicious string of questions mere seconds before Bowyer spun. Furthermore, when interviewed by Dr. Jerry Punch post-race, Dale Earnhardt Jr., who was directly behind Bowyer, said that Bowyer "just spun out. It was the craziest thing I saw," and that the behavior of Bowyer's car was inconsistent with Bowyer's claim that a right front tire blew out (the popping noise associated with a flat tire was not heard until after the spin). Vickers' pitting on the restart forced Newman to the back of the pitting cycle, costing him several positions. He ended up finishing third to Carl Edwards and Kurt Busch. By finishing third, Newman was tied with Truex in both wins (one) and final points for the second Wildcard spot. Truex won the tiebreaker on top-five finishes.

The following Monday, September 9, NASCAR issued some of the most severe penalties imposed on a team in NASCAR Cup Series history. MWR was placed on probation for the rest of the season, and Norris was suspended indefinitely. All three MWR teams were docked 50 owner/driver points for "actions detrimental to stock car racing." As this penalty was applied to pre-chase point totals, it knocked Truex out of the Wildcard spot and put Newman in his place. NASCAR was unable to find solid evidence that Bowyer's spin was deliberate, but did determine that Norris's order to have Vickers pit was a deliberate attempt to manipulate the chase standings in Truex's favor. Had the ruse not happened, Newman was on point to win the race, automatically becoming the second wild card and bumping Truex.

The ruse also resulted in a second controversy when radio transmissions were discovered suggesting that Front Row Motorsports and Penske Racing had struck a deal for David Gilliland to give up a spot on the track for Joey Logano, allowing Logano to race his way into the final lock-in position by one point over Jeff Gordon. A second NASCAR inquiry resulted in both teams being placed on probation for the remainder of the year. This ruse was found to have been directly caused by the pace car. Had the pace car situation for Bowyer's intentional spin not occurred, Gordon would have finished ahead of Logano by one point and Logano would have been bumped by Newman winning the race since Newman would have taken the first Wild Card. Although Logano was allowed to keep his chase berth, the field was expanded to 13 with the addition of Gordon on September 13. NASCAR chairman Brian France has always had the power to expand the chase field in exceptional circumstances, and decided to invoke it in this case. In France's view, Gordon had been put at an "unfair disadvantage" due to Penske and Front Row's collusion, as well as MWR's improper instructions to have Vickers pit. Had this not happened, France said, Gordon would have been in the chase by taking the last lock-in position, while Logano would have received one Wild Card position due to him being ahead of Truex and Newman in points, and Kasey Kahne would have taken the other Wild Card regardless of the race outcome as he had two wins entering Richmond.

==== 2014–2016 ====
On January 30, 2014, a new chase system resembling the playoff systems used in other major league sports was announced at Media Day.

Under the new system, the chase field was expanded to 16 drivers for the 10-race chase. The 16 drivers were chosen primarily on wins during the "regular season,” if fewer than 16 drivers won races, the remaining field was filled on the basis of regular season points. These drivers competed against each other while racing in the standard field (then 43 cars). The driver with the most points after the final 10 races was declared the champion.

This new playoff system instituted three "cuts" where drivers are eliminated from title contention as the chase progresses. In each cut the bottom four drivers are eliminated from title contention after the third race after a cut. After the first cut (Dover) in what was called the "Challenger Round,” the field was reduced to 12. The bottom four winless drivers kept their points after the first cut, while the remaining 12 chase drivers' points are reset to 3,000 points. After three more races, the cut line eliminated the bottom four winless drivers after the sixth chase race (Talladega) in the "Contender Round,” reducing the size of the field another 33%. Drivers who missed the second cut had their points reset to their score at the end of the first cut, plus the combined points accumulated in the three races in the "Contender Round." Those who continued have their points all reset to 4,000. Then the "Eliminator Round" involved axing 50% of the chase grid with the final cut, cutting the new bottom four drivers after the penultimate race at Phoenix, leaving the top four drivers to have their point totals reset to 5,000 so that they are tied for the final race at Homestead-Miami for the title run. The drivers who missed the cut after this round have their score reset to the score at the end of the first cut, plus total points accumulated in the six previous races. Of these four drivers who made this cut, the driver with the best absolute finish (no bonus points are involved) at Homestead was then crowned the season champion.

Under this system, any chase driver who won a race during a playoff round is automatically guaranteed a spot in the next round. Up to three drivers thus could advance to the next round of the chase through race wins, regardless of their actual points position after the final (third) race in that round. The remaining drivers to advance was determined by points.

The round names were removed starting in 2016, being changed to "Round of 16,” "Round of 12,” "Round of 8,” and "Championship 4."

To identify the drivers within the 43-car field that were still involved in each round of the chase, NASCAR designated various cosmetic changes in 2014: for these drivers, their cars' roof numbers, windshield header, front splitters, and fascia are colored yellow, and the chase logo appears on the front quarter panel.

==== 2017 ====
The previous championship format, renamed NASCAR Playoffs, was maintained for the 2017 season, but with changes. A revised regular-season points system was adopted, splitting races into three stages. Stages 1 and 2 are roughly 1/4 of the laps each, and stage 3 is about the last 1/2 of the race. (Note: Except for the Coca-Cola 600 which is split into 4 equal lengths) The top 10 drivers at the end of the first two stages each race earn additional bonus points towards the championship, 10 points for the first place car down to 1 point for the 10th place car. At the end of the race, the normal championship point scheme is used to award points to the entire field. Additionally, "playoff points" are awarded during the regular season for winning stages, winning races, and finishing the regular season in the top 16 on the championship points standings. 1 playoff point for the winner of a stage, 5 playoff points plus an automatic berth into the round of 16 for the race winner. (In case there are more than 16 race winners in the season, then the top 16 in race wins move on). Also, more bonus points for Top-10 in points standings at the end of the regular season: 1st place in regular season points earns 15 playoff bonus points in addition to the points earned with race or stage wins; 2nd place earns 10 playoff points, 3rd place: 8, 4th place: 7, 5th place: 6, 6th place: 5, 7th place: 4, 8th place: 3, 9th place: 2, and 10th place: 1. Playoff points are also awarded in each playoff race, except the final race, for those drivers still competing for the championship, for winning stages and winning races. If a driver qualifies for the championship, these playoff points will be added into their point totals after the resets for the first 3 rounds (round of 16, round of 12, round of 8). For the Championship 4 (final race), there are no bonus points involved, and the highest finishing driver of the 4 is declared the champion. This means a driver can have less regular season points than another driver, but be seeded higher due to more wins.

==== Kevin Harvick rule – fifth place ====
Adopted from 2014 onwards, on the suggestion of driver Kevin Harvick, fifth place in the season-ending standings will be determined amongst the chase drivers eliminated in each of the chase rounds during the final races.

===== First round elimination =====
Drivers eliminated in the first round will retain their chase score (for example, a driver with one win during the season eliminated after scoring 75 points during the first round will score 2,080 points) and start the fourth race the same score after the first three races, and will accumulate points for the remainder of the season.

===== Missed the second or third cut =====
Drivers eliminated in the second or third round will have their score reverted to the score at the end of the first round, then their individual race scores for the three (eliminated in the second round) or six races (eliminated in the third round), respectively, before their elimination from the championship contention will be combined with the score after the third race of the first round for the driver's total score.

===== For the final race =====
After ten races, the drivers positions 5–16 will be determined by the total number of points accumulated in the ten races (bonus points will apply), without the points resets of the second or third rounds, added to the driver's base Chase score with bonuses added. In the final race, unlike the four championship contenders who cannot score bonus points (the winner is determined by the driver who finished the best of those four), both non-playoff and playoff drivers eliminated from the championship are eligible to score all bonus points, so drivers who are contending for positions 5-16 will compete solely against each other.

==== 2018–2025 ====
The previous championship format is maintained, but a few changes were added to the design touches on the cars involved in the playoffs. For the 2018 season, NASCAR collaborated with the Race Team Alliance and Twitter to unveil customized hashtags and emojis for the top 16 drivers entering the playoffs. Each driver will have their hashtag and emoji displayed on the sides of their cars until they are eliminated from contention. Non-playoff drivers can have their hashtags and the Twitter logo displayed on their cars. This was in effect until the fall Kansas race. From the fall Martinsville race to the fall Phoenix race, all hashtag and emoji labels were replaced with the NBC logo. At the season-ending Homestead race, all cars featured Snapcodes as part of a partnership with Snapchat.

The visual, social-media oriented gimmicks above were discontinued for 2019. For 2020, the banners of drivers in the playoffs read "Playoffs" instead of "Cup Series,” while in 2021 playoff drivers have yellow windshield banners and rear spoilers. In 2022, with the introduction of the Next Gen car, NASCAR added a clause that reserved their right to ban drivers/teams from competing in the playoffs if NASCAR found an L3 violation on their car during any pre-race or post-race inspection. For 2023, NASCAR removed the requirement that drivers had to be at least 30th (20th for Xfinity and Truck) in the standings to be eligible for the playoffs by the way of a race victory, thus all full-time drivers and all drivers who receive a playoff wavier are eligible to qualify for the playoffs with a win. In 2025, after Kyle Larson was granted a playoff waiver for missing the 2024 Coca-Cola 600 due to weather, another rule change was made where drivers that were granted a playoff waiver for reasons other than medical or family-related (or in the Truck Series, age-related) reasons would lose all their playoff points, thus beginning the playoffs with 2,000 points.

==== 2026 ====
The points system was reformatted and was once again rebranded to The Chase. This format utilizes the same underpinnings of the original iteration of "The Chase for the Cup" in place from 2004 to 2013, with some alterations. 16 drivers will still qualify for the Chase, but no cutoffs are applied and the "win-and-you're-in" rule has been removed; a race win will no longer automatically qualify a driver for the Chase. All drivers have their points reset to a minimum of 2,000 points, with the regular season champion given an additional 100 points; 2nd to 15th also gain additional points depending on their position.

| Position | Points |
|---|---|
| 1 | 2100 |
| 2 | 2075 |
| 3 | 2065 |
| 4 | 2060 |
| 5 | 2055 |
| 6 | 2050 |
| 7 | 2045 |
| 8 | 2040 |
| 9 | 2035 |
| 10 | 2030 |
| 11 | 2025 |
| 12 | 2020 |
| 13 | 2015 |
| 14 | 2010 |
| 15 | 2005 |
| 16 | 2000 |

=== Cup Series tracks ===
The following are the ten race tracks at which the final ten NASCAR Cup Series races for the Championship. Texas Motor Speedway (Fort Worth, Texas) was added in 2005 as a result of the outcome of the Ferko lawsuit which eliminated Darlington Raceway (Darlington, South Carolina) by NASCAR. Also, by way of a 3-way track change, Talladega Superspeedway moved to a later date, Atlanta Motor Speedway moved to the Labor Day weekend date, and Auto Club Speedway moved to a later date inside the chase (starting 2009).

In 2011, as part of a substantial schedule realignment, a number of further changes occurred in the chase:

- Auto Club Speedway lost its playoff date.
- Chicagoland Speedway became host of the playoff opener. To accommodate this move, the races at Loudon, Dover, and Kansas all moved forward one week.
- Talladega and Martinsville swapped dates.

In 2012:

- Talladega and Kansas swapped dates.

In 2013:

- Talladega and Kansas swapped the dates back.

In 2015:

- Charlotte and Kansas swapped dates.

In 2017:

- Talladega and Kansas swapped dates again.

In 2018, as part of a substantial schedule realignment, a number of further changes occurred in the playoffs:

- New Hampshire lost its playoff date. Las Vegas replaces New Hampshire as the playoff opener.
- Chicagoland race removed from the playoffs; moved back to July.
- Richmond was the second race in the playoffs.
- Charlotte race moved one week earlier and held for the first time in the infield road-course (the first playoff race on a road course).
- Dover race moved one week later, replacing the Charlotte race and becoming the first race in the second round.

In 2020, as part of a substantial schedule realignment:

- Homestead-Miami no longer hosts the final race of the season as the race date was moved to late March, ending a tradition dating back to 2002; the final race of the season is now held in Phoenix.
- Dover race removed from the playoffs; moved to late August.
- Darlington became the host of the playoff opener, the Las Vegas race became the first race of the second round.
- Bristol Motor Speedway hosted a race in the playoffs for the first time, as the Bass Pro Shops NRA Night Race (which serves as the last race of the first round) moved from late August to mid-September.
- Charlotte race was moved two weeks back, becoming the last race of the second round.
- Martinsville race was moved two weeks back, becoming the last race of the third round.

In 2021:

- Kansas and Texas swapped dates.

In 2022:

- Richmond race removed from the playoffs; moved to mid-August.
- Kansas race moved up to the second week, replacing Richmond as the second race of the first round.
- Las Vegas and Texas swapped dates.
- Homestead-Miami returns to the playoffs for the first time since 2019, becoming the second race of the third round.

In 2024, as part of a substantial schedule realignment:

- Texas loses a race date; moved to April.
- Atlanta's second race moved from early July to early September; opening the playoffs.
- Watkins Glen moved from late August to early September, becoming the second race in the first round.
- Darlington moved one week earlier to regular-season finale.
- Kansas moved two weeks later, becoming the first race in the second round.

In 2025:

- Atlanta race removed from the playoffs; moved to late June as the opening race in the new NASCAR In-Season Challenge.
- Watkins Glen race removed from the playoffs, moved to mid-August.
- Homestead–Miami race removed from the playoffs, moved back to mid-March.
- Gateway and Loudon join the playoffs
- Talladega is moved to the second date of the Round of 8.
- Darlington returned host of the playoff opener.

In 2026:

- Homestead-Miami Speedway will return as the season finale in a new rotational system implemented by NASCAR that will see different tracks host the championship race each season.
- Kansas becomes the fourth.
- New Hampshire race removed from the playoffs; moves to mid-August.
- Las Vegas becomes the fifth race.

In 2027:

- Richmond returned after a 6-year hiatus, replacing Darlington as the opening race, with Darlington becoming the regular season finale.
- Watkins Glen returned after a 3-year hiatus, replacing St. Louis as the second race, with St. Louis moving to mid-August.
- New Hampshire returned after a year hiatus, replacing Bristol as the third race, with Bristol moving to it's traditional mid-August race from 1976 to 2019.

| Track | City | 04 | 05 | 06 | 07 | 08 | 09 | 10 | 11 | 12 | 13 | 14 | 15 | 16 | 17 | 18 | 19 | 20 | 21 | 22 | 23 | 24 | 25 | 26 | 27 |
|---|---|---|---|---|---|---|---|---|---|---|---|---|---|---|---|---|---|---|---|---|---|---|---|---|---|
| Richmond Raceway | Richmond, VA | —N/a | —N/a | —N/a | —N/a | —N/a | —N/a | —N/a | —N/a | —N/a | —N/a | —N/a | —N/a | —N/a | —N/a | 2 | 2 | 2 | 2 | —N/a | —N/a | —N/a | —N/a | —N/a | 1 |
| Watkins Glen International | Watkins Glen, NY | —N/a | —N/a | —N/a | —N/a | —N/a | —N/a | —N/a | —N/a | —N/a | —N/a | —N/a | —N/a | —N/a | —N/a | —N/a | —N/a | —N/a | —N/a | —N/a | —N/a | 2 | —N/a | —N/a | 2 |
| New Hampshire Motor Speedway | Loudon, NH | 1 | 1 | 1 | 1 | 1 | 1 | 1 | 2 | 2 | 2 | 2 | 2 | 2 | 2 | —N/a | —N/a | —N/a | —N/a | —N/a | —N/a | —N/a | 4 | —N/a | 3 |
| Kansas Speedway | Kansas City, KS | 4 | 4 | 3 | 3 | 3 | 3 | 3 | 4 | 6 | 4 | 4 | 5 | 5 | 6 | 6 | 6 | 7 | 8 | 2 | 2 | 4 | 5 | 4 | 4 |
| Las Vegas Motor Speedway | Las Vegas, NV | —N/a | —N/a | —N/a | —N/a | —N/a | —N/a | —N/a | —N/a | —N/a | —N/a | —N/a | —N/a | —N/a | —N/a | 1 | 1 | 4 | 4 | 7 | 7 | 7 | 7 | 5 | 5 |
| Charlotte Motor Speedway | Concord, NC | 5 | 5 | 5 | 5 | 5 | 5 | 5 | 5 | 5 | 5 | 5 | 4 | 4 | 4 | 3 | 3 | 6 | 6 | 6 | 6 | 6 | 6 | 6 | 6 |
| Phoenix Raceway | Avondale, AZ | 8 | 9 | 9 | 9 | 9 | 9 | 9 | 9 | 9 | 9 | 9 | 9 | 9 | 9 | 9 | 9 | 10 | 10 | 10 | 10 | 10 | 10 | 7 | 7 |
| Talladega Superspeedway | Talladega, AL | 3 | 3 | 4 | 4 | 4 | 7 | 7 | 6 | 4 | 6 | 6 | 6 | 6 | 5 | 5 | 5 | 5 | 5 | 5 | 5 | 5 | 8 | 8 | 8 |
| Martinsville Speedway | Ridgeway, VA | 6 | 6 | 6 | 6 | 6 | 6 | 6 | 7 | 7 | 7 | 7 | 7 | 7 | 7 | 7 | 7 | 9 | 9 | 9 | 9 | 9 | 9 | 9 | 9 |
| Homestead-Miami Speedway | Homestead, FL | 10 | 10 | 10 | 10 | 10 | 10 | 10 | 10 | 10 | 10 | 10 | 10 | 10 | 10 | 10 | 10 | —N/a | —N/a | 8 | 8 | 8 | —N/a | 10 | 10 |
| Atlanta Motor Speedway | Hampton, GA | 7 | 7 | 7 | 7 | 7 | —N/a | —N/a | —N/a | —N/a | —N/a | —N/a | —N/a | —N/a | —N/a | —N/a | —N/a | —N/a | —N/a | —N/a | —N/a | 1 | —N/a | —N/a | —N/a |
| Texas Motor Speedway | Fort Worth, TX | —N/a | 8 | 8 | 8 | 8 | 8 | 8 | 8 | 8 | 8 | 8 | 8 | 8 | 8 | 8 | 8 | 8 | 7 | 4 | 4 | —N/a | —N/a | —N/a | —N/a |
| Auto Club Speedway | Fontana, CA | —N/a | —N/a | —N/a | —N/a | —N/a | 4 | 4 | —N/a | —N/a | —N/a | —N/a | —N/a | —N/a | —N/a | —N/a | —N/a | —N/a | —N/a | —N/a | —N/a | —N/a | —N/a | —N/a | —N/a |
| Chicagoland Speedway | Joliet, IL | —N/a | —N/a | —N/a | —N/a | —N/a | —N/a | —N/a | 1 | 1 | 1 | 1 | 1 | 1 | 1 | —N/a | —N/a | —N/a | —N/a | —N/a | —N/a | —N/a | —N/a | —N/a | —N/a |
| Dover Motor Speedway | Dover, DE | 2 | 2 | 2 | 2 | 2 | 2 | 2 | 3 | 3 | 3 | 3 | 3 | 3 | 3 | 4 | 4 | —N/a | —N/a | —N/a | —N/a | —N/a | —N/a | —N/a | —N/a |
| Darlington Raceway | Darlington, SC | 9 | —N/a | —N/a | —N/a | —N/a | —N/a | —N/a | —N/a | —N/a | —N/a | —N/a | —N/a | —N/a | —N/a | —N/a | —N/a | 1 | 1 | 1 | 1 | —N/a | 1 | 1 | —N/a |
| Gateway Motorsports Park | Madison, IL | —N/a | —N/a | —N/a | —N/a | —N/a | —N/a | —N/a | —N/a | —N/a | —N/a | —N/a | —N/a | —N/a | —N/a | —N/a | —N/a | —N/a | —N/a | —N/a | —N/a | —N/a | 2 | 2 | —N/a |
| Bristol Motor Speedway | Bristol, TN | —N/a | —N/a | —N/a | —N/a | —N/a | —N/a | —N/a | —N/a | —N/a | —N/a | —N/a | —N/a | —N/a | —N/a | —N/a | —N/a | 3 | 3 | 3 | 3 | 3 | 3 | 3 | —N/a |

Notes

- The North Carolina track was known as Lowe's Motor Speedway from 1999 to 2009. After the 2009 season, Lowe's chose not to renew its sponsorship contract, causing the track to revert to its original name of Charlotte Motor Speedway.
- The Kevin Harvick rule applies in both eliminations. Eliminated drivers' scores in the first round will continue to accumulate, while drivers eliminated in the second round will have their scores reverted to the end of the first round, in addition to all accumulated points from races in the second round, and drivers race for fifth.

== O'Reilly Auto Parts and Truck Series ==
On January 19, 2016, NASCAR announced the introduction of a playoff format for the Xfinity Series and the Camping World Truck Series. Both series used the same elimination formula as the NASCAR Cup Series playoffs, however, with some modifications (most notably, smaller fields, and only two rounds of elimination instead of three, due to both having seven races in their playoff formats compared to the ten in the NASCAR Cup Series playoffs). In the Truck playoffs, there were only eight drivers eligible for the title. At both elimination races, the bottom two drivers in the playoffs standings were eliminated from contention; However, on January 21, 2020, NASCAR announced that the playoff field for the truck series would expand from eight drivers to ten drivers with the bottom two being eliminated after the Round of 10 and the bottom four eliminated after the Round of 8. The Xfinity playoffs had twelve drivers, and the bottom four in points were eliminated at the end of each round. The rules for fifth place continued to be the same.

The visual identification introduced in 2021 in the Cup Series also apply in the lower two series, with red (in 2021)/purple (from 2022 onwards) banners, spoilers, and splitters for Xfinity Series playoff contenders, and blue (until 2022)/red (from 2023 onwards, as well with driver's last name on the windshield) for Truck Series counterparts.

As the playoff format for the Cup Series was reformatted back into The Chase in 2026, it was announced that the now-O'Reilly Auto Parts Series and Craftsman Truck Series would also receive Chases of their own, albeit with modifications like with the old Playoff system (nine races and twelve drivers for the O'Reilly Auto Parts Series, seven races and ten drivers for the Craftsman Truck Series). The points allocation would remain the same as with the Cup Series but would stop with the last driver in each Chase. As such, all O'Reilly Chase drivers would reset with a minimum of 2,020 points, with the Truck Series minimum being 2,030 points.

As an anti-Buschwhacking measure, Cup Series drivers are prohibited from racing in lower series' Chase races.

== Comparison of Playoff Champion vs Non-Playoff Points standings ==
Ten different drivers have won the NASCAR Cup Series championship since the playoff system was implemented in 2004. Jimmie Johnson has the most championships under the playoff format with seven, while Tony Stewart, Kyle Busch, Joey Logano, and Kyle Larson are the only other drivers to win multiple championships since the system was introduced. Tyler Reddick is also the only multi-time championship in the Xfinity Series since the introduction of the system in the two lower national series.

Below are the hypothetical champions based on only regular points standings after last season race if no playoff format had been implemented. This section is only to demonstrate the impact of the playoffs on the outcome of the championship in comparison to regular points standings. Given the ways that different formats change race strategy and therefore results, there is no way to know if these exact outcomes would have occurred. Number of times listed for non-playoff champions includes championships won before the playoffs began in 2004 while regular season champions only count winners after the playoffs began in 2004.

=== Cup Series ===
Within the Cup Series:

- Eight times, in 2005, 2006, 2009, 2012, 2013, 2017, 2019, 2021, and 2025, the Cup Playoff Champion would also be the champion based on regular points standings.
- Three times, in 2005, 2017, and 2019, the Cup Playoff champion leads the points standings before the start of the playoffs.
- In four cases, in 2015, 2016, 2023 and 2024, the Cup Playoff champion wouldn't be in the Top 5 of the regular points standings.

| Year and Championship | Playoff-Champion Team | Final Non-Playoff points leader | Final Non-Playoff points standings | Regular season champion | Points standings at regular season conclusion | Comment |
|---|---|---|---|---|---|---|
| 2004 Nextel Cup | Kurt Busch; Roush Racing | Jeff Gordon (5th title) | Jeff Gordon 5042; Jimmie Johnson 4995; Dale Earnhardt Jr. 4869; Kurt Busch 4795; Tony Stewart 4701 | Jeff Gordon | Jeff Gordon 3602; Jimmie Johnson 3542; Dale Earnhardt Jr. 3541; Tony Stewart 3410; Matt Kenseth 3337 | Without the chase, Jeff Gordon would have won his 5th championship at Homestead-Miami. Jimmie Johnson would finish 2nd, but it would not be enough because Jeff Gordon would finish 3rd. |
| 2005 Nextel Cup | Tony Stewart; Joe Gibbs Racing | Tony Stewart (2nd title) | Tony Stewart 5199; Greg Biffle 4984; Jimmie Johnson 4771; Mark Martin 4676; Carl Edwards 4597 | Tony Stewart | Tony Stewart 3716; Greg Biffle 3531; Rusty Wallace 3412; Jimmie Johnson 3400; Kurt Busch 3304 | Without the Chase, Tony Stewart would have won the championship either way at the second-to-last race at Phoenix. |
| 2006 Nextel Cup | Jimmie Johnson; Hendrick Motorsports | Jimmie Johnson | Jimmie Johnson 5158; Matt Kenseth 5154; Kevin Harvick 4838; Tony Stewart 4727; Denny Hamlin 4725 | Matt Kenseth | Matt Kenseth 3785; Jimmie Johnson 3728; Kevin Harvick 3481; Kyle Busch 3424; Denny Hamlin 3348 | Without the Chase, Jimmie Johnson would have won the championship by just 4 points. At green flag pitstops, Johnson led a lap, which gave him 5 bonus points. Had he not led a lap during green flag pitstops, he would not have the 5 extra bonus points, and he would hand the title to Matt Kenseth by 1 point. |
| 2007 Nextel Cup | Jimmie Johnson; Hendrick Motorsports | Jeff Gordon (6th title) | Jeff Gordon 5455; Jimmie Johnson 5102; Tony Stewart 4749; Matt Kenseth 4718; Denny Hamlin 4623 | Jeff Gordon (2nd title) | Jeff Gordon 3849; Tony Stewart 3537; Denny Hamlin 3490; Jimmie Johnson 3439; Matt Kenseth 3430 | Without the Chase, Jeff Gordon would have won the championship at the third-to-last race at Texas. |
| 2008 Sprint Cup | Jimmie Johnson; Hendrick Motorsports | Carl Edwards | Carl Edwards 5236; Jimmie Johnson 5220; Kyle Busch 4984; Greg Biffle 4747; Jeff Burton 4709 | Kyle Busch | Kyle Busch 3878; Carl Edwards 3671; Jimmie Johnson 3576; Dale Earnhardt Jr. 3488; Jeff Burton 3384 | Without the Chase, Carl Edwards would win his first championship with a fuel strategy call with 39 laps to go in the race. Jimmie Johnson would go to pit road with 14 laps to go for a two tire pitstop and race leader Matt Kenseth ran out of fuel with 3 laps to go right in front of Edwards. Carl Edwards would save fuel and win the race running out of fuel to win the championship. |
| 2009 Sprint Cup | Jimmie Johnson; Hendrick Motorsports | Jimmie Johnson (2nd title) | Jimmie Johnson 5156; Jeff Gordon 5090; Tony Stewart 5085; Denny Hamlin 4806; Mark Martin 4762 | Tony Stewart (2nd title) | Tony Stewart 3806; Jeff Gordon 3627; Jimmie Johnson 3534; Denny Hamlin 3491; Kurt Busch 3322 | The final Non-Playoff points standings with a 66 points gap is closer than the Chase standings with a 141 points gap; Johnson would still have won the championship at the second-to-last race at Phoenix with the non-Playoff points gap. |
| 2010 Sprint Cup | Jimmie Johnson; Hendrick Motorsports | Kevin Harvick | Kevin Harvick 5274; Jimmie Johnson 4989; Denny Hamlin 4865; Carl Edwards 4820; Jeff Gordon 4669 | Kevin Harvick | Kevin Harvick 3723; Kyle Busch 3495; Jeff Gordon 3493; Carl Edwards 3427; Tony Stewart/Jimmie Johnson 3417 (tie) | Without the Chase, Kevin Harvick would have won the championship at the third-to-last race at Texas. |
| 2011 Sprint Cup | Tony Stewart; Stewart–Haas Racing | Carl Edwards (2nd title) | Carl Edwards 1278; Kevin Harvick 1200; Tony Stewart 1191; Jimmie Johnson 1188; Matt Kenseth 1180 | Kyle Busch (2nd title) | Kyle Busch 890; Jimmie Johnson 887; Carl Edwards 878; Jeff Gordon 872; Kevin Harvick 867 | New points scoring system was introduced. Without the Chase, Carl Edwards would have won the championship at the second-to-last race at Phoenix. |
| 2012 Sprint Cup | Brad Keselowski; Penske Racing | Brad Keselowski | Brad Keselowski 1259; Greg Biffle 1240; Jimmie Johnson 1231; Matt Kenseth 1218; Clint Bowyer 1213 | Greg Biffle | Greg Biffle 914; Dale Earnhardt Jr. 902; Matt Kenseth 897; Jimmie Johnson 880; Brad Keselowski 868 | Jimmie Johnson's rear axle failure and 36th-place finish at Miami gave Brad Keselowski the championship. |
| 2013 Sprint Cup | Jimmie Johnson; Hendrick Motorsports | Jimmie Johnson(3rd title) | Jimmie Johnson 1248; Kevin Harvick 1207; Matt Kenseth 1192; Kyle Busch 1163; Dale Earnhardt Jr. 1144 | Carl Edwards | Carl Edwards 842; Jimmie Johnson 841; Kevin Harvick 828; Kyle Busch 811; Matt Kenseth 807 | Without the Chase, Jimmie Johnson would have won his last championship, becoming a 3x champion. |
| 2014 Sprint Cup | Kevin Harvick; Stewart–Haas Racing | Jeff Gordon (7th title) | Jeff Gordon 1253; Joey Logano 1216; Brad Keselowski 1179; Dale Earnhardt Jr. 1175; Kevin Harvick 1171 | Jeff Gordon (3rd title) | Jeff Gordon 914; Dale Earnhardt Jr. 883; Brad Keselowski 830; Joey Logano 829; Jimmie Johnson 802 | Without the Chase, Jeff Gordon would win his 7th title and become a 7x champion instead of Jimmie Johnson. |
| 2015 Sprint Cup | Kyle Busch; Joe Gibbs Racing | Kevin Harvick (2nd title) | Kevin Harvick 1321; Joey Logano 1299; Brad Keselowski 1217; Dale Earnhardt Jr. 1198; Martin Truex Jr. 1165 | Kevin Harvick (2nd title) | Kevin Harvick 978; Joey Logano 948; Dale Earnhardt Jr. 894; Brad Keselowski 873; Jimmie Johnson 852 | Kyle Busch, the playoff champion, would be 20th in the final Non-Playoff points standings after missing 11 points-paying races due to injury. |
| 2016 Sprint Cup | Jimmie Johnson; Hendrick Motorsports | Kevin Harvick (3rd title) | Kevin Harvick 1159; Joey Logano 1133; Kyle Busch 1105; Brad Keselowski 1089; Denny Hamlin 1084 | Kevin Harvick (3rd title) | Kevin Harvick 876; Brad Keselowski 834; Joey Logano 783; Denny Hamlin 773; Kurt Busch 762 | Jimmie Johnson, the playoff champion, would be 7th in the final Non-Playoff points standings. |
| 2017 Monster Energy Cup | Martin Truex Jr. Furniture Row Racing | Martin Truex Jr. | Martin Truex Jr. 1481; Kyle Busch 1314; Kevin Harvick 1276; Kyle Larson 1224; Brad Keselowski 1184 | Martin Truex Jr. (First time title officially recognized) | Martin Truex Jr. 1033; Kyle Larson 938; Kyle Busch 932; Kevin Harvick 892; Denny Hamlin 817 | Introduction of stage points. Without the playoffs, Martin Truex Jr. would have won the championship at the second-to-last race at Phoenix. |
| 2018 Monster Energy Cup | Joey Logano; Team Penske | Kyle Busch | Kyle Busch 1434; Kevin Harvick 1386; Martin Truex Jr. 1264; Joey Logano 1247; Kurt Busch 1216 | Kyle Busch (3rd title) | Kyle Busch 1073; Kevin Harvick 1032; Martin Truex Jr. 884; Kurt Busch 881; Joey Logano 878 | Without the playoffs, Kyle Busch would have won his first championship in 2018 instead of 2015. |
| 2019 Monster Energy Cup | Kyle Busch; Joe Gibbs Racing | Kyle Busch (2nd title) | Kyle Busch 1330; Kevin Harvick 1328; Joey Logano 1321; Martin Truex Jr. 1308; Denny Hamlin 1293 | Kyle Busch (4th title) | Kyle Busch 988; Joey Logano 971; Kevin Harvick 922; Denny Hamlin 911; Martin Truex Jr. 872 | Without the playoffs, Kyle Busch would have won the championship by just 2 points. |
| 2020 NASCAR Cup Series | Chase Elliott; Hendrick Motorsports | Kevin Harvick (4th title) | Kevin Harvick 1401; Denny Hamlin 1310; Chase Elliott 1265; Brad Keselowski 1264; Joey Logano 1251 | Kevin Harvick (4th title) | Kevin Harvick 1058; Denny Hamlin 943; Brad Keselowski 913; Martin Truex Jr. 887; Joey Logano 866 | Without the playoffs, Kevin Harvick would have won the championship at the third-to-last race at Texas. |
| 2021 NASCAR Cup Series | Kyle Larson; Hendrick Motorsports | Kyle Larson | Kyle Larson 1456; Denny Hamlin 1420; Chase Elliott 1211; Ryan Blaney 1158; Kyle Busch 1147 | Kyle Larson | Kyle Larson 1027; Denny Hamlin 1009; Chase Elliott 859; Kyle Busch 852; William Byron 842 | |
| 2022 NASCAR Cup Series | Joey Logano; Team Penske | Chase Elliott | Chase Elliott 1201; Ryan Blaney 1140; Joey Logano 1134; Kyle Larson 1124; Ross Chastain 1102 | Chase Elliott | Chase Elliott 939; Joey Logano 809; Ryan Blaney 801; Martin Truex Jr. 798; Kyle Larson 789 | Without the playoffs, Chase Elliott would have won the championship at the second-to-last race at Martinsville. Martin Truex Jr. missed the playoffs despite finishing 4th in points at the end of the regular season. |
| 2023 NASCAR Cup Series | Ryan Blaney; Team Penske | William Byron | William Byron 1198; Denny Hamlin 1190; Christopher Bell 1126; Martin Truex Jr. 1119; Kyle Larson 1106 | Martin Truex Jr. (2nd title) | Martin Truex Jr. 884; Denny Hamlin 837; William Byron 819; Christopher Bell 782; Brad Keselowski 742 | Without the playoffs, William Byron would have won the championship by just 8 points. |
| 2024 NASCAR Cup Series | Joey Logano; Team Penske | Kyle Larson (2nd title) | Kyle Larson 1189; Christopher Bell 1167; Chase Elliott 1163; William Byron 1138; Tyler Reddick 1107 | Tyler Reddick | Tyler Reddick 861; Kyle Larson 860; Chase Elliott 832; Christopher Bell 784; William Byron 761 | Worst average finish (17.1) for a NASCAR championship win to date. Without the playoffs, Logano would've finished 12th in the standings. |
| 2025 NASCAR Cup Series | Kyle Larson; Hendrick Motorsports | Kyle Larson (3rd title) | Kyle Larson 1182; Christopher Bell 1166; William Byron 1163; Ryan Blaney 1155; Chase Elliott 1098 | William Byron | William Byron 864; Ryan Blaney 809; Kyle Larson 801; Chase Elliott 799; Christopher Bell 784 | William Byron lead the points for all but 7 races. His flat tire and 33rd-place finish at Phoenix gave Kyle Larson the championship. |
| 2026 NASCAR Cup Series | Kyle Larson Hendrick Motorsports | Denny Hamlin | | Denny Hamlin | Denny Hamlin 1027; Ryan Blaney 938; Tyler Reddick 894; Ty Gibbs 892; Chase Briscoe 761 | Without the Chase, Denny Hamlin would have won his first championship at the second-to-last race at Martinsville. Regardless of the postseason, Larson would remain a 3-time champion, with his third title arriving in 2025 rather than 2026. |

=== O'Reilly Auto Parts Series ===
| O'Reilly Auto Parts Series Year and Championship | Playoff-Champion Team | Final Non-Playoff points leader | Final Non-Playoff points standings | Regular season champion | Points standings at regular season conclusion | Comment |
|---|---|---|---|---|---|---|
| 2016 Xfinity Series | Daniel Suárez; Joe Gibbs Racing | Elliott Sadler | Elliott Sadler 1150; Daniel Suárez 1110; Justin Allgaier 1062; Ty Dillon 1021; Erik Jones 1005 | Erik Jones | Erik Jones 891; Daniel Suárez 832; Justin Allgaier 823; Ty Dillon 807; Elliot Sadler 797 | Without the chase, Elliott Sadler would have won the championship at the second-to-last race at Phoenix. |
| 2017 Xfinity Series | William Byron; JR Motorsports | Elliott Sadler (2nd title) | Elliott Sadler 1181; William Byron 1074; Justin Allgaier 1044; Daniel Hemric 964; Cole Custer 945 | Elliott Sadler (First title officially recognized) | Elliott Sadler 939; Justin Allgaier 821; William Byron 803; Daniel Hemric 736; Brennan Poole 727 | Without the playoffs, Elliott Sadler would have won the championship at the third-to-last race at Texas. |
| 2018 Xfinity Series | Tyler Reddick; JR Motorsports | Daniel Hemric | Daniel Hemric 1230; Cole Custer 1206; Christopher Bell 1205; Justin Allgaier 1200; Elliott Sadler 1163 | Justin Allgaier | Justin Allgaier 988; Cole Custer 944; Christopher Bell 940; Elliott Sadler 919; Daniel Hemric 910 | Tyler Reddick, the playoff champion, would be 6th in the final Non-Playoff points standings. |
| 2019 Xfinity Series | Tyler Reddick; Richard Childress Racing | Tyler Reddick | Tyler Reddick 1404; Christopher Bell 1369; Cole Custer 1336; Justin Allgaier 1311; Austin Cindric 1200 | Tyler Reddick | Tyler Reddick 1132; Christopher Bell 1083; Cole Custer 1012; Justin Allgaier 990; Austin Cindric 923 | |
| 2020 Xfinity Series | Austin Cindric; Team Penske | Austin Cindric | Austin Cindric 1390; Chase Briscoe 1347; Ross Chastain 1319; Noah Gragson 1275; Justin Haley 1154 | Austin Cindric | Austin Cindric 1135; Chase Briscoe 1070; Ross Chastain 1059; Noah Gragson 994; Justin Allgaier 918 | |
| 2021 Xfinity Series | Daniel Hemric; Joe Gibbs Racing | Austin Cindric (2nd title) | Austin Cindric 1336; A.J. Allmendinger 1288; Justin Allgaier 1203; Daniel Hemric 1201; Noah Gragson 1101 | A.J. Allmendinger | A.J. Allmendinger 1043; Austin Cindric 1033; Justin Allgaier 924; Daniel Hemric 895; Harrison Burton 871 | |
| 2022 Xfinity Series | Ty Gibbs; Joe Gibbs Racing | A.J. Allmendinger | A.J. Allmendinger 1337; Ty Gibbs 1295; Noah Gragson 1293; Justin Allgaier 1253; Josh Berry 1131 | A.J. Allmendinger (2nd title) | A.J. Allmendinger 1048; Justin Allgaier 995; Noah Gragson 988; Ty Gibbs 976; Josh Berry 901 | Without the playoffs, A.J. Allmendinger would have won the championship at the second-to-last race at Martinsville. |
| 2023 Xfinity Series | Cole Custer; Stewart–Haas Racing | John Hunter Nemechek | John Hunter Nemechek 1281; Justin Allgaier 1254; Austin Hill 1246; Cole Custer 1174; Sam Mayer/Sheldon Creed 976 (tie) | Austin Hill | Austin Hill 1011; John Hunter Nemechek 1006; Justin Allgaier 971; Cole Custer 872; Josh Berry 804 | |
| 2024 Xfinity Series | Justin Allgaier JR Motorsports | Chandler Smith | Chandler Smith 1180; Cole Custer 1173; Justin Allgaier 1157; Austin Hill 1078; Sheldon Creed 1072 | Cole Custer | Cole Custer 912; Justin Allgaier 909; Chandler Smith 890; Austin Hill 826; Sheldon Creed 815 | Without the playoffs, Chandler Smith would have won the championship by just 7 points. |
| 2025 Xfinity Series | Jesse Love Richard Childress Racing | Connor Zilisch | Connor Zilisch 1283; Justin Allgaier 1224; Jesse Love 1089; Sam Mayer 1076; Austin Hill 1033 | Connor Zilisch | Connor Zilisch 984; Justin Allgaier 930; Sam Mayer 883; Jesse Love 846; Austin Hill 801 | Without the playoffs, and despite missing a race, Connor Zilisch would have won the championship at the second-to-last race at Martinsville. |

=== Truck Series ===
| Truck Series Year and Championship | Playoff-Champion Team | Final Non-Playoff points leader | Final Non-Playoff points standings | Regular season champion | Points standings at regular season conclusion | Comment |
|---|---|---|---|---|---|---|
| 2016 Truck Series | Johnny Sauter; GMS Racing | Johnny Sauter | Johnny Sauter 592; William Byron 589; Daniel Hemric 568; Timothy Peters 558; Christopher Bell 550 | William Byron | William Byron 470; Daniel Hemric 442; Johnny Sauter 433; Timothy Peters 428; Christopher Bell 421 | Without the Chase, Johnny Sauter would have won the championship by just 3 points. |
| 2017 Truck Series | Christopher Bell; Kyle Busch Motorsports | Christopher Bell | Christopher Bell 1027; Johnny Sauter 975; Matt Crafton 893; Chase Briscoe 862; Ben Rhodes 794 | Christopher Bell (First title officially recognized) | Christopher Bell 681; Johnny Sauter 660; Chase Briscoe 623; Matt Crafton 607; Ben Rhodes/Ryan Truex 544 (tie) | Without the playoffs, Christopher Bell would win the championship at the second-to-last race at Phoenix. |
| 2018 Truck Series | Brett Moffitt; Hattori Racing Enterprises | Johnny Sauter (2nd title) | Johnny Sauter 942; Noah Gragson 893; Grant Enfinger 853; Brett Moffitt 849; Stewart Friesen 835 | Johnny Sauter | Johnny Sauter 683; Noah Gragson 599; Grant Enfinger 587; Stewart Friesen 582; Brett Moffitt 560 | Without the playoffs, Johnny Sauter would have won the championship at the second-to-last race at Phoenix. |
| 2019 Truck Series | Matt Crafton; ThorSport Racing | Brett Moffitt | Brett Moffitt 921; Grant Enfinger 882; Stewart Friesen 863; Matt Crafton 841; Ben Rhodes 773 | Grant Enfinger | Grant Enfinger 699; Brett Moffitt 673; Matt Crafton 640; Stewart Friesen 639; Ben Rhodes 576 | |
| 2020 Truck Series | Sheldon Creed; GMS Racing | Brett Moffitt (2nd title) | Brett Moffitt 883; Sheldon Creed 873; Austin Hill 859; Zane Smith 852; Ben Rhodes 813 | Austin Hill | Austin Hill 645; Brett Moffitt 603; Ben Rhodes 587; Zane Smith 586; Sheldon Creed 539 | Austin Hill lead the points for all but 3 races. His engine failure and 35th-place finish at Martinsville gave Brett Moffitt the championship. |
| 2021 Truck Series | Ben Rhodes; ThorSport Racing | John Hunter Nemechek | John Hunter Nemechek 868; Ben Rhodes 790; Sheldon Creed 761; Todd Gilliland 751; Austin Hill 749 | John Hunter Nemechek | John Hunter Nemechek 649; Austin Hill 560; Ben Rhodes 546; Todd Gilliland 504; Zane Smith 489 | Without the playoffs, John Hunter Nemechek would have won the championship at the second-to-last race at Martinsville. |
| 2022 Truck Series | Zane Smith; Front Row Motorsports | Zane Smith | Zane Smith 897; Chandler Smith 853; John Hunter Nemechek 832; Ty Majeski/Stewart Friesen 808 (tie); Ben Rhodes 777 | Zane Smith | Zane Smith 616; Chandler Smith 576; John Hunter Nemechek 571; Stewart Friesen 545; Christian Eckes/Ty Majeski 539 (tie) | |
| 2023 Truck Series | Ben Rhodes; ThorSport Racing | Corey Heim | Corey Heim 903; Christian Eckes 817; Grant Enfinger 803; Carson Hocevar 776; Ben Rhodes 766 | Corey Heim | Corey Heim 616; Ty Majeski 565; Zane Smith 561; Ben Rhodes 553; Grant Enfinger 538 | Without the playoffs, and despite missing a race, Heim would have won the championship at the second-to-last race at Homestead. His 25-point penalty for driving conduct during the final race wouldn't change this outcome. |
| 2024 Truck Series | Ty Majeski ThorSport Racing | Christian Eckes | Christian Eckes 1058; Corey Heim 958; Ty Majeski 864; Nick Sanchez 810; Grant Enfinger 757 | Christian Eckes | Christian Eckes 728; Corey Heim 654; Ty Majeski 579; Nick Sanchez 547; Grant Enfinger 506 | Without the playoffs, Christian Eckes would have won the championship at the second-to-last race at Martinsville. |
| 2025 Truck Series | Corey Heim Tricon Garage | Corey Heim (2nd title) | Corey Heim 1217; Layne Riggs 930; Ty Majeski 879; Kaden Honeycutt 823; Chandler Smith 808 | Corey Heim | Corey Heim 851; Layne Riggs 660; Chandler Smith 646; Ty Majeski 599; Daniel Hemric 590 | Without the playoffs, Corey Heim would have won the championship at the fourth-to-last race at the Charlotte ROVAL. |

== Criticism ==
The NASCAR playoffs has been criticized as a "gimmick" to the sport and has been questioned over whether it is fair compared to not having the playoff at all.

=== 2020 ===
In 2020, Kevin Harvick dominated for most of the season. He won nine races and had an average finish of 7.1. Despite this, Harvick was eliminated during the final "Round of 8" race at Martinsville Speedway. Entering the race being 42 points above the cutline, Matt Kenseth made contact with Harvick which knocked the valve stem off his left-rear tire. Needing one position to make the "Championship Four", Harvick spun Kyle Busch in the final corner of the final lap, but spun himself out as well. This ended his opportunity to race for his second Cup championship.

After the race, Kevin Harvick remarked that winning the NASCAR championship "aren’t like winning like Petty and Earnhardt used to win them." During the post race press conference, a reporter asked Harvick how he could justify to people that he was clearly the dominant car all year but not running for a championship, Harvick responded: “That’s the system that we work in and it’s obviously skewed more towards entertainment than the whole year, so it’s exciting to watch and has that format that goes with it and you take them as they come and we race within the system that they give us and do our best. It just didn’t work out for us. The last three weeks didn’t go exactly how we needed them to and you’ve got to be right when you get to this Round of 8.”

=== 2025 ===
Criticism by fans and media members grew late in the 2025 season as drivers Corey Heim and Connor Zilisch dominated the Craftsman Truck Series and NASCAR Xfinity Series, respectively. Heim ultimately won the championship at the season-ending race at Phoenix Raceway despite a late-race caution costing him the lead. Zilisch lost the final race and the championship to Jesse Love. Fans at the track were notably quiet and subdued after the victory, with commentators criticizing one-race-take-all nature of the format. The following day, Denny Hamlin dominated the final NASCAR Cup Series race of the season at Phoenix but a late caution cost him the lead and he was unable to pass Kyle Larson on a restart to win his first championship. Following the race Hamlin said "In this moment, I never want to race again." William Byron, who was also competing for the championship and brought out the late caution after crashing, apologized to Hamlin following the race. Larson himself said that winning the championship was a "weird feeling."

Prior to the final weekend, the championship format had been criticized by former and current drivers such as Kevin Harvick, Mark Martin, Christopher Bell, and Brad Keselowski. Notably, three-time series champion Joey Logano is a proponent of the playoff format. NASCAR president Steve O'Donnell said the format would be changing for the 2026 season, and would ultimately result in the 2026 Chase format, eliminating bracket-style eliminations, playoff points and the "win and you're in" qualification system.

=== Other controversies ===
Matt Crafton's Truck Series title in 2019 has also been used to argue that the format can produce a winless champion despite its supposed focus on wins after 2014; on the debut year of elimination format, Ryan Newman secured his spot on that year's Championship 4 despite winning zero races, which could theoretically allow him to win that year's Cup Series title without winning a single race or just the championship race (the latter would happen in 2021 in the Xfinity Series when Daniel Hemric did so, having been winless for his entire NASCAR career with ten second-place finishes).

Kyle Busch's 2015 Cup Series title, and NASCAR's decision to grant him waiver preventing him from missing the playoffs, was criticized due to the fact he missed 11 races during the season due to an injury, something which would have prevented him from winning the championship in non-playoff and earlier Chase playoff points formats. Similar waivers were granted to Ryan Newman, who was out following his 2020 Daytona 500 crash and Matt Kenseth, who replaced Kyle Larson after he was released from Chip Ganassi Racing following a live streaming controversy in 2020, although both failed to qualify for that year's playoffs. Kurt Busch was also granted a similar waiver in 2022 after he was injured at the qualifying for the 2022 M&M's Fan Appreciation 400 but opted not to use the waiver when his injury turned out to be a career-ending accident. Following the 2024 Coca-Cola 600, controversy persisted regarding Larson's eligibility for the waiver after he missed the race entirely when weather issues at both the Indianapolis 500 (resulting in the race being delayed by several hours) and Coca-Cola 600 (which was called off after it rained out in the second stage) resulted in Larson not driving a single lap of the NASCAR portion of the Double Duty; NASCAR ultimately approved the waiver.

Another source of criticism in regards of the playoffs is that media/broadcast attention would shift towards playoff contenders during that portion. During the ESPN broadcast of 2009 Dickies 500, the vast majority of the race's commentary was spent talking about Jimmie Johnson despite the fact he had crashed out on lap 3 and finished 38th. In addition, following the addition of eliminations and automatic playoff berth from winning a race in 2014, critics have noted that the format encouraged more aggressive driving in order to claim a race win necessary to qualify for (or advance to the next round of) the playoffs, as well as encouraging teams to manipulate penultimate races to increase the odds of championship victory, as demonstrated at 2013 Federated Auto Parts 400 (which occurred in the pre-elimination format) and 2024 Xfinity 500. Poor driving conduct involving championship contenders at the 2023 Craftsman 150 (that year's Truck Series finale) have also been attributed to the playoff format as well.
