= Ty Norris =

American businessman

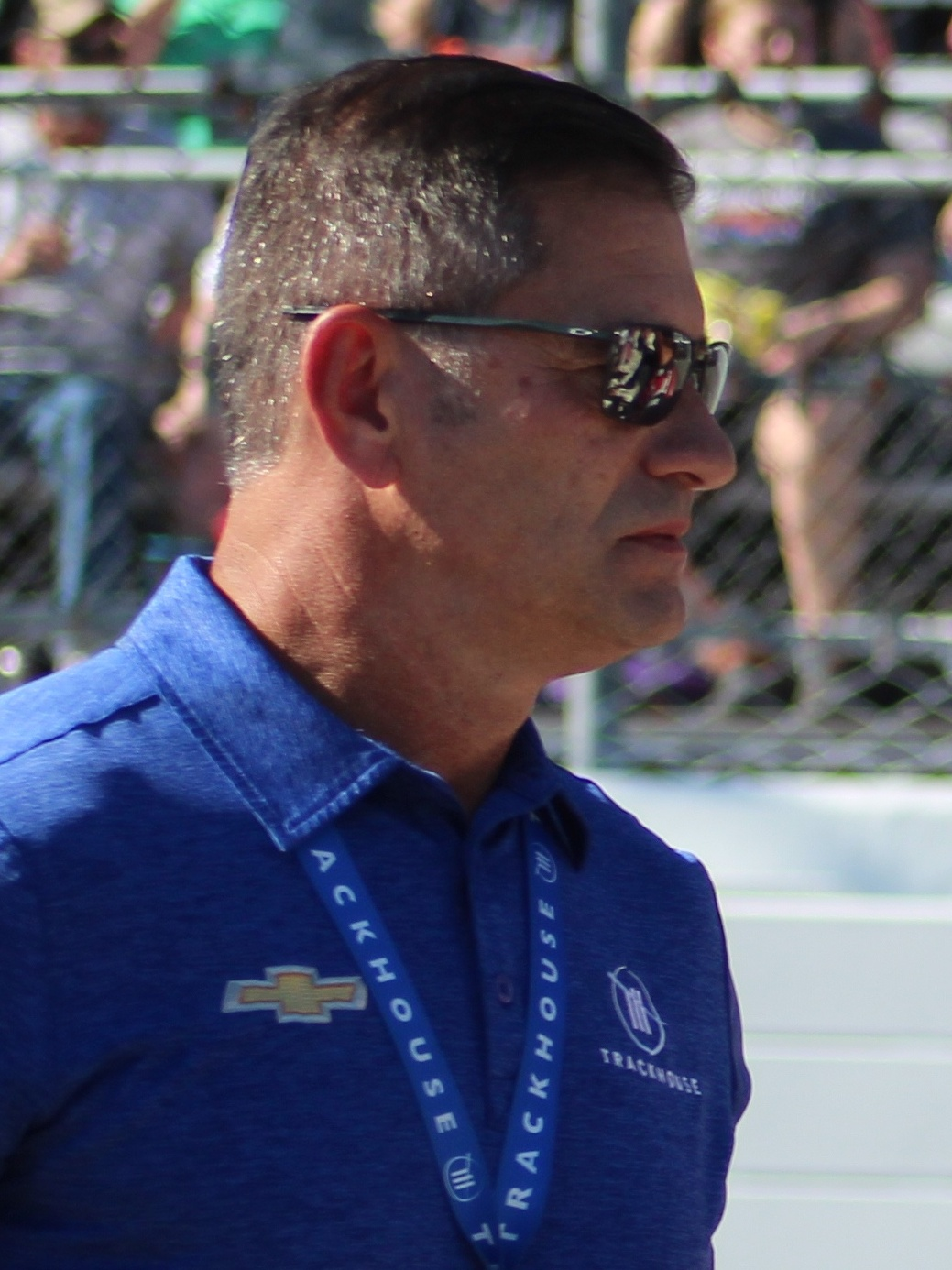
- Norris at Martinsville Speedway in 2023
- Born: Tyrone Young Norris Jr. July 19, 1965 (age 61); Sumter, South Carolina, U.S.
- Education: Delaware State University
- Occupation: Motorsports executive
- Organization(s): Dale Earnhardt, Inc. (1996–2004); Speedway Motorsports, Inc. (2004–2005); Michael Waltrip Racing (2005–2015); Spire Sports + Entertainment (2015–2021); Trackhouse Racing (2021–2024); Kaulig Racing (2024–present)

Tyrone Young Norris Jr. (born July 19, 1965) is an American motorsports executive who works for Kaulig Racing as their Chief Business Officer. He previously was a team executive for Dale Earnhardt, Inc., Michael Waltrip Racing, Spire Motorsports and Trackhouse Racing.

== Career ==
=== Early career ===
Norris started in NASCAR as a sports writer after studying journalism at Delaware State University. After covering several races for the Delaware State News, Norris left journalism for a job as the manager of media relations and event operations with RJ Reynolds Tobacco Company in 1990.

=== Dale Earnhardt, Inc. (1996–2004) ===
Norris caught the attention of Dale Earnhardt as the 7-time champion began building his own organization Dale Earnhardt, Inc. In 1996, Earnhardt hired him to serve as executive vice president of motorsports for DEI. He played an integral role in helping the organization prepare for its entry into NASCAR's top level of competition in 1998. During the next 8 years, he, Earnhardt, and others helped build DEI into a motorsports juggernaut with the team winning 65 NASCAR races and 4 championships from 1996 to 2004. Norris left DEI prior to the 2004 Daytona 500 after a disagreement with owner Teresa Earnhardt, that resulted in Teresa giving Norris a choice of signing a termination letter or taking a 67% reduction in pay to remain with the organization.

=== Speedway Motorsports, Inc. (2004–2005) ===
In 2004, successful businessman Bruton Smith hired Norris to serve as the vice president of special projects for Speedway Motorsports, Inc. (SMI). Norris oversaw the special projects associated with Smith's motorsports conglomerate, which features ownership of tracks in Atlanta, Georgia; Bristol, Tennessee, Charlotte, North Carolina; Las Vegas, Nevada; Fort Worth, Texas; and Sonoma, California; as well as of several industry-supporting companies, such as the Performance Racing Network (PRN), The Source International (QVC's motorsports merchandise partner), and SMI Properties.

=== Michael Waltrip Racing (2005–2015) ===
In 2013, Norris was involved in controversy after the Federated Auto Parts 400, where he was serving as spotter for Brian Vickers. After MWR driver Clint Bowyer spun out to force a caution, Norris directed Vickers to pit on the restart in order to help another MWR driver Martin Truex Jr. win the tiebreaker for a spot in the Chase for the Sprint Cup with Ryan Newman. As it developed, Newman was pushed so far back in the pitting cycle that he lost several positions and ultimately finished third, not high enough to break the tie with Truex. On September 9, NASCAR decided to suspend Norris indefinitely, determining that his order to have Vickers pit was a deliberate attempt to manipulate the Chase standings. It also docked all three MWR teams 50 driver/owner points before all point totals were reset for the Chase—a move which knocked Truex Jr. out of the Chase in favor of Newman. MWR was also fined a NASCAR-record $300,000.

Following the incident at Richmond and the hefty fine that followed, NASCAR suspended Norris indefinitely from all competition. Norris was reinstated after ten races and soon returned to MWR. He would act as a spotter for Vickers for a few races before transitioning to a public/sponsor relations position. However, MWR was never able to fully recover after the penalties and was eventually forced to close its doors in 2015.

=== Spire Sports + Entertainment (2015–2020) ===
In late 2015, he joined marketing agency Spire Sports + Entertainment, eventually becoming president of the firm. When Spire expanded to form a Cup team in 2018, they picked up Norris as the president of the new Spire Motorsports. As of 2020, Norris was no longer listed on Spire's website in any capacity.

=== Trackhouse Racing and Kaulig Racing (2021–2024) ===
In 2020 it was reported that Norris was a partner in Justin Marks' Trackhouse Racing, who competes in the NASCAR Cup Series. In September 2024, he left Trackhouse.

=== Kaulig Racing (2024–present) ===
In September of 2024 after he left Trackhouse Racing, he would be hired by Kaulig Racing to become their Chief Business Officer.
