= NASCAR Unleashed =

2011 video game

- Cover art featuring the cars of Kyle Busch and Dale Earnhardt Jr.
- Developer: Firebrand Games
- Publisher: Activision
- Platforms: Nintendo 3DS, PlayStation 3, Wii, Xbox 360
- Release: NA: November 1, 2011
- Genre: Auto racing
- Modes: Single-player, multiplayer

NASCAR Unleashed is a racing video game developed by Firebrand Games and published by Activision. It was released on November 1, 2011 for PlayStation 3, Xbox 360, Wii, and Nintendo 3DS.

== Features ==
NASCAR Unleashed is an arcade racing game, allowing players to play as 15 different drivers in NASCAR Sprint Cup racing series, and race around six locations, including Chicagoland Speedway, Daytona International Speedway, Homestead-Miami Speedway, Martinsville Speedway, Talladega Superspeedway, and a fictional track named Unleashed Speedway. Each location has multiple layouts, which accounts for 12 different track layouts.

As with the previous two Wii NASCAR games, Kart Racing and The Game: 2011, the Wii version of Unleashed leverages the Wii Remote's versatility and motion controls to offer multiple control schemes, but unlike them, it does not support the GameCube controller.

== Drivers ==
15 real life NASCAR drivers are featured in the game, followed by 3 fictional drivers. Each driver has one paint scheme available when one starts the game, and the more one progresses through the championships, the more bonus paint schemes one will unlock. There are 20 cars in a race for the PS3 and Xbox 360 versions, while the Wii and 3DS versions only had 12 cars in a race.

== Reception ==
Reception

Review scores
Publication	Score
Game Informer	7/10
Nintendo Life	(3DS) 3/10

The game has received mixed reviews. Operation Sports rated it 4.5/10, praising the spin on the tracks, but criticizing the repetitiveness and lack of online multiplayer. PlayStation: The Official Magazine gave the game a 60/100 score: "It may not be a game for racing purists, but if you're looking to introduce stock car racing to a child, look no further". Game Informer gave the game a rating of 7/10, saying that "NASCAR Unleashed may be just another kart racer, but it's also not as foreign of a concept to the sport as you may think. Its drafting, rivalries, and car contact are certainly key aspects of the sport represented here – just not enough".
