= Ferrari: The Race Experience =

2010 racing video game

- Wii version's European cover art
- Developer: Eutechnyx
- Publisher: System 3 (Note: Distributed in North America by Activision and in Europe by Koch Media)
- Platforms: PlayStation 3 Wii
- Release: PlayStation 3: EU/AU: October 6, 2010; NA: September 13, 2011; Wii: EU: November 26, 2010
- Genre: Racing
- Mode: Single-player

Ferrari: The Race Experience is a racing video game developed by System 3 and Eutechnyx and published by System 3. The game released on October 6, 2010 in Europe and Australia, on September 13, 2011 in North America for the PlayStation 3 and on November 26, 2010 for the Wii. The game is the sequel to Ferrari Challenge: Trofeo Pirelli.

== Gameplay ==
Like other racing video games, Ferrari: The Race Experience is less of a driving game and more of a simulation. A total of 17 tracks are included, such as the Fiorano Circuit and includes 34 cars such as the Ferrari 458 Italia and Ferrari 599XX.

The cars in the game range from road cars to GT production vehicles. More specifically, the GT Race, Road GT and Classics. The main car of the game is the F355 Challenge, which does not have to be unlocked and appears at the beginning. The other cars are unlocked by winning trophies with different cars or progressing through the Challenge mode of the game. Career mode joins other classic racing modes such as Time Trial, Quick Race, Arcade and Tournament.

A still from the game, featuring a 2002 Ferrari 360 GT on the PlayStation 3 version

== Development and release ==
This experience with Ferrari began as part of an exclusive Wii (Ferrari Challenge Trofeo Pirelli - accompanied by Bruno Senna) game which was transferred to the PlayStation 3 before release in 2010 as a downloadable title and strengthened in options. Originally due out in Europe and Australia on September 29, 2010 via the PlayStation Store, the game was delayed by a week, releasing on October 6, 2010. A Wii release followed shortly in Europe on November 26, 2010. The PlayStation 3 version of the game released in North America almost a year later on September 13, 2011. A physical version of the game was released exclusively in Europe for PlayStation 3 on November 25, 2011.

== Reception ==
Reception

Aggregate score
Aggregator	Score
Metacritic	PS3: 59/100; Wii: 54/100

Review scores
Publication	Score
Eurogamer	PS3: 6/10 (Note: This review was done by a reviewer for Eurogamer.pt.); Wii: 4.5/10 (Note: Eurogamer rated the game 6/10, and Eurogamer.es rated the game 3/10.)
Jeuxvideo.com	10/20
PlayStation Official Magazine – UK	6/10
Multiplayer.it	7.9/10
Vandal	7/10

=== Critical reception ===
Ferrari: The Race Experience received "mixed or average" reviews according to review aggregator website Metacritic. The game received a wide range of reviews from different versions of Eurogamer.

Vítor Alexandre for the Portuguese version of Eurogamer rated the game 6/10. He stated that the game's driving sensation is "disconsolate, lacking emotion and sharpness," and that the game is "to consider for a second line in the driving game genre." Whereas Joao Diniz Sanches for the English version of Eurogamer also rated the game 6/10. He stated that the game's opening screen was "a bit like opening the glove box to find that you'd suddenly switched off the traction control," and that the game's visuals were "crude" but that is said to be outperformed by the "horrendous soundtrack." But José L. Ortega for the Spanish version of Eurogamer on the other hand, rated the game 3/10, stating that the game gives players a "crazy desire" to "go down to the garage and put our hands on our beat-up SEAT Pandas from twenty years ago".

Multiplayer.it rated the game 7.9/10. The reviewer stated that the game "moves away quite clearly from the concept of hybrid-simulation," and that the game has "poorly defined textures, which might not even be noticed at speed, there are annoying framerate problems, frankly inexplicable, present even in conditions of perfect solitude." The PlayStation Official Magazine – UK rated the game 6/10. They stated in their issue that the cars are "visually slick" but "slow," and that the game is "worth a gander".

Jeuxvideo.com rated the game 10/20. He stated that the gameplay of the game is "undoubtedly the most successful element of the game even if it renews neither the genre nor the series." A few reviewers praised the game's AI of the opponents in the game. Whereas José Manuel for Vandal rated the game 7/10. He stated that he "cannot fail to comment on the wide range of game cameras available," and that "the number and quality of the models is impressive".

=== Sales ===
The game, along with its predecessor, sold more than 3 million units. According to two editors, the game was most popular in Japan.
