= Big Mutha Truckers =

2002 video game

- European cover art
- Developers: Eutechnyx; Raylight Studios (handhelds)
- Publishers: EU: Empire Interactive; NA: THQ; NA: Destination Software (GBA/DS); EU: Zoo Digital Publishing (GBA/DS)
- Platforms: GameCube, PlayStation 2, Xbox, Microsoft Windows, Game Boy Advance, Nintendo DS
- Release: 6 December 2002: PlayStation 2; EU: 6 December 2002; NA: 17 June 2003 Xbox; EU: 6 December 2002; NA: 23 June 2003 Microsoft Windows; NA: 16 March 2003; EU: 2 May 2003 GameCube; EU: 27 June 2003; NA: 14 August 2003 DS; NA: 19 October 2005; EU: 2 December 2005 Game Boy Advance; NA: 9 November 2005; EU: 9 December 2005
- Genre: Racing
- Mode: Single-player

Big Mutha Truckers is a 2002 open world racing video game developed by British studio Eutechnyx. Set in fictional Hick County, the game revolves around completing trips between cities, delivering goods, and competing in races at the helm of a semi-truck.

The game was released on December 6, 2002, for the Xbox and PlayStation 2 in Europe. Ports for the GameCube and Microsoft Windows, along with releases in North America, were released throughout 2003. It underperformed commercially and received negative reviews due to repetitive gameplay, outdated graphics, and lackluster audio. A version of the game for the Game Boy Advance and Nintendo DS was released by Raylight Studios in 2005.

A sequel, Big Mutha Truckers 2, was released in 2005.

== Plot ==
With plans to retire from the family business, Ma' Jackson challenges her four children, Cletus, Earl, Rawkus, and Bobbie-Sue, to a "Trial by Truckin". She gives each sibling 60 days in which to make deliveries to various cities in Hick State County, with the company going to the sibling with the most money in the end.

== Gameplay ==
Big Mutha Truckers is primarily a racing game, in the same vein as 18 Wheeler: American Pro Trucker. Players spend the majority of their time on the road, navigating the highways between the game's six cities: Salt Sea City, Capital City, Greenback, Skeeter's Creek, Smokestack Heights, and Big Mutha Truckin' Incorporated. The player will earn most of their money through trade, shipping goods from cell phones to beer, with additional opportunities from mini-games and challenge races.

Every city features three locations: a garage, a bar, and a store. The garage allowed players to repair damage, refuel, switch trailers to carry different kinds of cargo, buy upgrades to improve their rig, or design custom logos for their truck. In the bar the player can find tips on where to buy and sell certain cargo, and a loan shark. The store allows the player to buy and sell goods, with prices varying by town. When visiting Big Mutha Truckin' Incorporated, the bar and store are replaced by visits to Ma Jackson.

On the road, the player can earn extra money by smashing other vehicles. This money can be multiplied through combos, or by hitting a vehicle with the trailer. If the player earns a high enough combo, he can make reward icons appear on the road. When collected, these icons can refuel the truck, repair damage, or offer a cash bonus. Law enforcement and biker gangs are both present in the game, and cause trouble for the player if they attack them by mistake. Any cop will pursue and capture a player, while bikers will attempt to shoot up the trailer, or even detach it from the truck. In either case, it is a significant blow to the player's cash. Every cop can be avoided with skillful driving, and bikers can be shaken away from the truck.

Occasionally, the player will be asked to accomplish a side-mission when they visit a bar. These point-to-point races are good for cash if the player can complete them.

== Reception ==
Reception

Aggregate scores
Aggregator	Score
GameRankings	(PS2) 66.41% (GC) 65.36% (Xbox) 65.35% (DS) 56% (PC) 55.80% (GBA) 50%
Metacritic	(GC) 63 out of 100 (PS2) 62 out of 100 (PC) 61 out of 100 (Xbox) 59 out of 100 (DS) 48 out of 100

Review scores
Publication	Score
Edge	6 out of 10
Electronic Gaming Monthly	5.83 out of 10
Eurogamer	6 out of 10
Game Informer	(PS2) 7.5 out of 10 (Xbox) 7.25 out of 10
GameSpot	6.2 out of 10
GameSpy	2 out of 5
GameZone	(Xbox) 6.5 out of 10 (PS2) 6 out of 10
IGN	6.3 out of 10 (DS) 6 out of 10 (PC) 5.3 out of 10 (GBA) 5 out of 10
Nintendo Power	2.5 out of 5
Official U.S. PlayStation Magazine	3 out of 5
PC Gamer (US)	71%
Playboy	53%
The Village Voice	7 out of 10

Big Mutha Truckers received a mixed reception. GameRankings and Metacritic gave it a score of 66.41% and 62 out of 100 for the PlayStation 2 version; 65.36% and 63 out of 100 for the GameCube version; 65.35% and 59 out of 100 for the Xbox version; 56% and 48 out of 100 for the DS version; 55.80% and 61 out of 100 for the PC version; and 50% for the Game Boy Advance version.

GameSpot critic Alex Navarro gave the game a 6.2 out of 10 rating, noting that while it "earnestly tries to be a fun game", flaws in the presentation and a lack of varied gameplay lead to a game that "as a full-on purchase ... just doesn't measure up". Similar complaints about the game's commerce model came from Andy Mahood of GameSpy, who wrote that "no matter how much you dress it up ... this lather-rinse-repeat cycle can turn stale after only a few hours of play".
