= Tennis Master =

2007 video game

- Developer: System 3
- Publisher: System 3
- Platforms: Wii, Nintendo DS
- Release: 2007
- Genre: Sports

Tennis Master is a tennis video game released in 2007 by System 3 for use on various systems, including the Wii. It has been released in Europe and North America.
