= Mob Rule (disambiguation) =

Mob Rule is a PC game released in 1999 by Simon & Schuster and Studio 3.

Mob Rule may also refer to:

- Mob rule or ochlocracy, a government by mob or a mass of people
- Mob Rule, a Flash enemy in DC Comics

== See also ==
- Mafia
- Mob Rules (disambiguation)
