= Turbo Charge =

1991 racing game by System 3

- Cover art
- Publisher: System 3
- Platforms: Commodore 64; Amiga, Atari ST (incomplete)
- Release: 1991
- Genre: Racing game
- Mode: Single-player

Turbo Charge is a 1991 racing game video game released by System 3 for the Commodore 64.

== Plot ==
A terrorist group, identifying themselves only as "Dominator", have broken into a UN ammo stockpile and stolen missiles. The player takes control of Agents Agaippa and Drusus, who must chase after the terrorists in their Lamborghini Countach to reclaim the missiles.

== Gameplay ==
Commodore 64 screenshot

Turbo Charge consists of five levels. In each level, the player takes control of a Lamborghini Countach in pursuit of criminals. The player can shoot at cars on the road using a standard handgun with unlimited ammunition, or using a limited supply of rockets (5 shots per level).

Each level has a strict time limit, and the Lamborghini has a limited supply of fuel, which can be replenished by running over fuel canisters that occasionally appear on the road. The player can also engage the Countach's turbocharger for a temporary burst of speed, at the cost of additional fuel being used. Running out of time or fuel, or sustaining too much damage, results in game over.

The various roads in the game have a roller coaster feel to them, with many steep climbs and falls. The player will frequently encounter road splits, and taking the incorrect turn will result in the player smashing their car against a wall, incurring additional damage.

== Development ==
Turbo Charge was inspired by the driving section of System 3's earlier release, Vendetta. The programming of the road routine used an advanced version of the same system utilised in Power Drift.

Conversions for the Amiga and Atari ST were also developed, but never completed.

== Reception ==
Turbo Charge received a Gold Medal award (96%) from Zzap!64.
