= The Fast and the Furious (2006 video game) =

- Developer: Eutechnyx
- Publishers: Namco Bandai Games (Note: Released under the Namco label in Europe.): EU: Electronic Arts (PlayStation 2); EU: Deep Silver (PlayStation Portable)
- Director: Brian Jobling
- Producers: Mark South; Martin Hall
- Designers: Kevin Shaw; Lee Barber
- Composer: Peter Connelly
- Series: Fast & Furious
- Platforms: PlayStation 2 PlayStation Portable
- Release: PlayStation 2: NA: September 26, 2006; EU: March 9, 2007; AU: March 22, 2007; PlayStation Portable: NA: April 24, 2007; EU: October 26, 2007 (as Tokyo Drift)
- Genre: Racing
- Modes: Single-player, multiplayer

The Fast and the Furious is a 2006 racing game developed by Eutechnyx and published by Namco Bandai Games for the PlayStation 2 and PlayStation Portable (PSP). The game is based on the film The Fast and the Furious: Tokyo Drift.

== Gameplay ==
Players race on the Shuto Expressway (Wangan) or mountain roads (Touge). On the expressway, players can compete in point-to-point races or contests to achieve the highest speed between the start and finish. The mountain roads also have point-to-point races but also have competitions for the most drift. Hotspots are positioned along the roads to access race starts and car dealerships. There are eight different dealerships where vehicles can be purchased: Nissan dealership, Mitsubishi dealership, Mazda dealership, Honda dealership, Toyota dealership, Subaru dealership, Lexus dealership, and a U.S. Naval Base – where according to the instruction booklet included with the game, cars are brought over by stationed soldiers who end up selling them or are just imported. The tune shops are spread over the map and offer performance upgrades, visual upgrades, and paint jobs which are free and fully customizable by the player. The game includes many Japanese cars such as the Mazda RX-7, Mitsubishi Lancer Evolution, Subaru Impreza WRX STI, Toyota Supra, Honda NSX and the Nissan Skyline. However, Honda and Acura vehicles were not featured in the PAL version, due to licensing issues. There are also some American cars such as the Chevrolet Corvette Z06 and the Shelby GT500 as well as the American assembled variants of Japanese vehicles.

== Development ==
In June 2002, Universal Interactive announced a Fast and the Furious game was in development by Genki, and showed off a demo of the game at E3 2003. The promotional trailer is included as one of the bonus features in the 2 Fast 2 Furious DVD. However, that game was cancelled when Universal Interactive was shut down as a separate publisher the following year after ties between parent company Vivendi Universal Games and Universal Studios were severed.

The published game was a wholly separate development, begun under license from the film studio. It is considered a spiritual successor to 2004's Street Racing Syndicate, which was also developed by Eutechnyx and published by Namco, and with which it shares many themes and gameplay elements.

According to Spin magazine, the game was also set to release for Windows & Xbox but never released.

In 2023, an unreleased prototype build of the game for the Xbox was found on an old Eutechnyx Xbox Development Kit by Dimitris Giannakis, better known as Modern Vintage Gamer, and released online.

== Reception ==
Reception

Aggregate scores
Aggregator	Score	
Aggregator	PS2	PSP
GameRankings	58%	55%
Metacritic	59/100	58/100

Review scores
Publication	Score	
Publication	PS2	PSP
Electronic Gaming Monthly	4.5/10	N/A
Eurogamer	5/10	N/A
Game Informer	6/10	N/A
GameSpot	6.6/10	6/10
GameSpy	2/5	N/A
GameZone	7.4/10	N/A
IGN	6.6/10	6.2/10
Official U.S. PlayStation Magazine	5/10	N/A
PlayStation: The Official Magazine	6/10	N/A
Detroit Free Press	3/4	N/A
Digital Spy	3/5	N/A

The game was met with mixed reception. GameRankings and Metacritic gave it a score of 58% and 59 out of 100 for the PlayStation 2 version and 55% and 58 out of 100 for the PSP version.
