= Supercar Challenge (video game) =

2009 video game

- Supercar Challenge box art
- Developer: Eutechnyx
- Publisher: System 3
- Platform: PlayStation 3
- Release: AU: September 3, 2009; EU: September 4, 2009; EU: December 14, 2012 (PSN)
- Genre: Racing
- Modes: Single-player, multiplayer

Supercar Challenge is a simulation racing video game released for the PlayStation 3 in September 2009, developed by Eutechnyx and published by System 3, the same company that produced 2008's Ferrari Challenge Trofeo Pirelli. The game includes more than 40 cars including Ferraris and the Bugatti Veyron and Aston Martin DBR9 and 22 tracks including the Nürburgring (Grand Prix section) and the Silverstone Circuit. The game was re-released with an improved game engine under the title Absolute Supercars in 2012.

== Gameplay ==
System 3 intended Supercar Challenge to be accessible to less experienced players, with a gradual learning curve. The AI also has been tweaked, due to criticisms of the AI in Ferrari Challenge.
