= Jocky Wilson's Darts Challenge =

1989 video game

Jocky Wilsons Darts Challenge
- Developers: Spike, Tink
- Publisher: Zeppelin Games
- Composer: Adam Gilmore
- Platforms: ZX Spectrum, Commodore 64, Amstrad CPC, Atari 8-bit
- Release: 1989
- Genre: Sports
- Modes: Single-player, multiplayer

Jocky Wilson's Darts Challenge is a video game of darts, created after darts champion Jocky Wilson. The game was published by Zeppelin Games and was released in 1989 for the Atari 8-bit computers, Commodore 64, ZX Spectrum, Amstrad CPC, and Amiga. Music for the game was composed by Adam Gilmore. Music for the Amiga version was composed by Stuart Taylor.

ZX Spectrum screenshot
