= Putty Squad =

1993 video game

- Developers: System 3 Dynamic Interactive Computer Entertainment (MD)
- Publisher: Ocean Software
- Designer: Phil Thornton
- Platforms: SNES, Amiga
- Release: SNES: EU: 1994; Amiga: EU: 24 December 2013
- Genre: Platform
- Mode: Single-player

Putty Squad is a 1994 video game developed by System 3 and published by Maximum Games and Ocean Software. It was originally developed for the Amiga 1200, but that version was not released until the end of 2013; prior to that date the SNES version was the only one to be released. Sega Mega Drive and MS-DOS ports also existed, but were cancelled. It is the sequel to Putty (1992). In December 2013, the Amiga version was released as a Christmas gift on System 3's website. In October 2015, the Mega Drive version was also released by a Sega-16 user who got a hold of a working prototype.

A remake was released in November 2013 for PlayStation 3, PlayStation 4, PlayStation Vita, Nintendo 3DS, Xbox Live Arcade, and Microsoft Windows. In November 2017, Super Putty Squad was released for Nintendo Switch.

Overall, while the original versions received positive reviews, the 2013 remake received negative reception from critics (though the 3DS port received more mixed reviews).

== Gameplay ==
Putty Squad is a platform game in which the player controls an amorphous blue blob, tasked with rescuing imprisoned putties. The player's putty can stretch in a variety of ways: sideways to cover ground faster, squash flat to absorb pick-up items, stretch upwards to climb, morph a fist to attack, or inflate to float upwards.

Putty can collect stars that increase his attack power: at first increasing the potency of his punch, but later allowing him to blow darts, electrocute enemies or throw bombs. This star power is reduced every time Putty is hit by an enemy.

== Original versions ==
Screenshot from the Amiga version, originally announced and developed in 1994, but ultimately published two decades later in 2013

The Amiga version of Putty Squad, although left unpublished until December 2013, was completely developed in 1994 to the point of demo versions being issued to magazines for release on cover disks, and Amiga magazines were also sent full review copies of Putty Squad, for which it received critical success. Amiga Format awarded a "Format Gold". Amiga Power awarded 91%, highlighting the varied level shapes, masterful animation, influence from the Mario video games (using a stunned enemy as a projectile weapon, secret doors, items hidden in blocks) and consistent game logic. Several instant-death situations were criticised: the bottom of the level is often difficult to distinguish, and falling through it kills Putty. Several enemies can also instantly kill Putty. CU Amiga awarded 94%, highlighting the fluid control and movement of Putty, balanced learning curve, presentation, and good use of the Amiga's AGA palette. This critical success, but lack of a published version, has made Putty Squad one of the most sought-after Amiga titles before its release in December 2013.

The Sega Mega Drive version was reportedly completed in 1995 and reviewed in several European magazines which were sent full review copies, like Spanish Hobby Consolas (#45, June 1995) and German GAMERS (August 1995 issue), but the game remained unpublished due to Ocean's diminishing support of the console and lack of interest from retailers. Prototypes of the game are known to exist, although none of them have been leaked into the public domain, making it a sought-after title in the scene of Mega Drive unreleased games. It was finally released by a Sega-16 user who got a hold of a working prototype and dumped the ROM in October 2015.

The PC MS-DOS version was projected by System 3 in late 1995 and demo versions were issued to magazines for release on cover disks, much like the Amiga version. The PC version was improved in several ways, including CG introductory cutscenes prior to the levels, but due to lack of interest from publishers, even though the game was finished, it was never released by the developers.

The Super Nintendo version is the only version of the original game to have been released prior to the long-awaited Amiga version in December 2013.

== Remake ==
Putty Squad (remake) Super Putty Squad
- Developers: System 3 East Point Software
- Publisher: System 3
- Platforms: Microsoft Windows, Nintendo 3DS, Nintendo Switch, PlayStation 3, PlayStation 4, PlayStation Vita, Xbox Live Arcade
- Release: PlayStation 4, PlayStation Vita, PlayStation 3: EU: 29 November 2013; AU: 5 December 2013 (PS4); NA: 11 March 2014 (PS4); AU: 16 April 2014 (Vita: PSN); NA: 22 April 2014 (Vita); AU: 25 June 2014 (PS3: PSN); JP: 10 December 2015 (PS4: PSN); Nintendo 3DS: EU: 17 April 2014; NA: 20 May 2014; Xbox Live Arcade: WW: 25 June 2014; Nintendo Switch: NA: 9 November 2017; PAL: 16 November 2017
- Genre: Platform
- Mode: Single-player

System 3 developed a new version of the game released in 2013 and 2014 for the PlayStation 3, PlayStation Vita and Nintendo 3DS.

An HD port of the game was released for the Nintendo Switch under the new title Super Putty Squad. The game was released worldwide via Nintendo eShop in November 2017, whilst physical retail copies launched only in Europe on 1 December.

Maximum Games published the game in North America for PlayStation 4, PlayStation Vita, and Nintendo 3DS as retail releases, whilst System 3 themselves published all other releases.

The remake received mixed reviews, scoring a 38/100 on Metacritic, with reviews stating that the game has not been improved for the more modern consoles, but the 3DS version had a more favourable response, with a 54 out of 100.
