= 007 Racing =

2000 video game

- Cover art featuring the Aston Martin DB5
- Developer: Eutechnyx
- Publisher: Electronic Arts (Note: Released under the EA Games brand name and co-published by MGM Interactive.)
- Composer: Allister Brimble
- Series: James Bond
- Platform: PlayStation
- Release: NA: 17 November 2000; EU: 15 December 2000
- Genre: Racing
- Modes: Single-player, multiplayer

007 Racing is a 2000 racing video game based on the James Bond license. It was developed by Eutechnyx, published by Electronic Arts, and released for the PlayStation console system. This game marks the seventh appearance of Pierce Brosnan's James Bond; the game included his likeness but not his voice, which is provided by Tim Bentinck. Including many revived characters from previous entries, the game is considered to be a spin-off of the original chronicles.

== Gameplay ==
In 007 Racing the player takes on the role of British secret agent James Bond, behind the wheel of several of his vehicles from the then-19 official films. Cars include the Aston Martin DB5 made famous in its initial appearance in Goldfinger, the Lotus Esprit from The Spy Who Loved Me and For Your Eyes Only, and the BMW Z8 that briefly appeared in The World Is Not Enough as well as seven other automobiles. Each car is equipped with all the usual gadgetry and weapons issued by R (voiced by John Cleese), the Quartermaster of a special branch of MI6 referred to as Q-Branch.

== Plot ==
In 007 Racing, a high-ranking European diplomat and businessman plans to hijack a shipment of NATO weapons and smuggle them to international terrorists inside cars that roll off the assembly line of his automotive plants. As Bond, it is up to the player to stop him. The gamer is supplied with several gadget-filled cars from the Bond universe to thwart the villain.

The story opens with Bond rescuing Cherise Litte from an Eastern European country (presumably Estonia) and getting her over the border in his Aston Martin DB5. Upon his return to London, he is informed by M that a freighter carrying top secret NATO weapons including laser-guided surface-to-air missiles, long-range missiles, missile shields, latest GPS technology and Q equipped BMW 750iL bound for Halifax was intercepted in the Labrador Sea, south of Greenland. Bond is tasked with finding the cargo. His mission takes him to New York City, where he is met by his friend from the CIA Jack Wade. Upon arriving in New York he is informed by a villain that a bomb has been planted on his car and that any attempt to defuse it or slow down the vehicle will cause it to explode. Bond jettisons the car in the Hudson River.

Bond continues with finding the electromagnetic pulse device that was stolen and destroying ten computers in the distribution center from which a car transporter carrying the smuggling cars. He intercepts the transporter with his Aston Martin. Bond then goes to Mexico with his BMW Z3, where he is pointed by questioning the transporter driver, the henchman Whisper. He is trying to track Zukovsky and once he manages, he finds out that behind everything is Dr Hammond Litte, Cherise's father, and that her rescue was just a decoy mission aiming to distract him from the freighter. Bond then engages in a race with Xenia Onatopp and her Ferrari F355 after which he gets captured and taken to Louisiana. He manages to escape and finds the stolen BMW, after which he pursues and destroys the boat driven by Jaws.

Back in New York, Bond downloads the files from four limousines with his BMW Z8 and discovers that Litte's real plan is to release a deadly virus that will kill millions. Bond then goes to the Baltic Sea with his Lotus Esprit and after infiltrating the opponent's underwater base he destroys the plane transporting the virus.

== Development and release ==
007 Racing was developed by Eutechnyx, which worked with MGM to create the game's storyline. It includes objectives and vehicles based on those featured in the James Bond films. 007 Racing uses a modified version of the game engine that was developed for Eutechnyx's earlier Le Mans 24 Hours. Lead programmer Peter Davies recalled in 2021: "given the huge differences in the game style it was a massive overhaul, but some core components like the physics engine, renderer, and build tools were retained."

In North America, 007 Racing was released in November 2000. A sequel for the PlayStation 2 was announced shortly thereafter, but was never released.

== Reception ==
Reception

Aggregate score
Aggregator	Score
Metacritic	51/100

Review scores
Publication	Score
AllGame	2/5
Edge	2/10
Electronic Gaming Monthly	2.83/10 (Note: Three critics of Electronic Gaming Monthly gave the game each a score of 1/10, 6/10, and 1.5/10.)
EP Daily	5.5/10
Game Informer	7/10
GameFan	42%
GameRevolution	C−
GameSpot	5.3/10
GameZone	8/10
IGN	5/10
Next Generation	2/5
Official U.S. PlayStation Magazine	3/5
Maxim	4/10

007 Racing received "mixed or average" reviews, according to review aggregator Metacritic.

Game Informer's Paul Anderson called the graphics "ugly" and "nasty", but said there are some "well-designed" missions. He called the voice acting "excellent", particularly praising the performance given by Cleese, but thought the game had an inconsistent mix of content.

Douglass C. Perry of IGN stated that 007 Racing is "a decent little game, as long as you don't expect too much from it". He added: "It's not original, nor is it good looking. It's filled with awkward spots and questionable areas (like when I reached the broken bridge in Escape and the vocals chimed in after it was too late to launch my parachute), and it becomes a chore rather than fun. Occasionally, there are little flashes of goodness (Escape and Gimme a Break are examples), but the game never really reaches any new planes of play that we've did already experience in Spy Hunter, back in the early 1980s. I mean if you're simply dying to drive Bond cars, rent this game, but don't buy it full price. Now, if you don't mind, I've got an old-school arcade to find."

Jeff Gerstmann of GameSpot gave a mixed review, stating: "The game's varied mission objectives occasionally give it a Driver-like feel, but the clunky control issues really manage to take you out of the game. The heavily modified Need for Speed engine [sic] is great for the fast action, fast driving missions, but the slower-paced, more combat-heavy levels suffer from the game's rough control. Overall, 007 Racing isn't polished enough to fill the needs of objective-based driving game fans. Fans of these types of games would be better served by Driver 2." Retro Gamer criticized the slow pace of the missions. David Chen of NextGen said that the game was "Fine as a rental car, but not worth the sticker price." Jake The Snake of GamePro said that the game "offers mild fun that will appeal for sure only to gamers who love both Bond and action-driving games. (Note: GamePro gave the game two 3.5/5 scores for graphics and fun factor, and two 4/5 scores for sound and control.)
