= Ride to Hell: Retribution =

2013 video game

- Developer: Eutechnyx
- Publisher: Deep Silver
- Producer: Graham James
- Writer: Tom Smetham
- Composer: Rival Sons
- Engine: Unreal Engine 3
- Platforms: PlayStation 3; Windows; Xbox 360
- Release: NA: 25 June 2013; EU: 28 June 2013; AU: 4 July 2013
- Genre: Action-adventure
- Mode: Single-player

Ride to Hell: Retribution is a 2013 action-adventure game developed by Eutechnyx and published by Deep Silver. It was released for Microsoft Windows, PlayStation 3 and Xbox 360.

Ride to Hell was originally announced in 2008 and was conceived as an open world game. The game was set to be released around the second quarter of 2009. Budget cuts and the closure of Deep Silver Vienna left the project stuck in development hell, and the lack of updates and the missed release date caused many gaming resources to label the game as cancelled. However, Eutechnyx continued to develop Ride to Hell until its re-announcement five years later in 2013. The developers cut the originally planned open-world concept in favour of a linear layout.

Ride to Hell was met with overwhelmingly negative reception from critics, many of whom considered it one of the worst video games of all time. Its gameplay, presentation, writing, voice acting, and technical glitches were all sources of condemnation.

== Gameplay ==
The player controls biker Jake Conway from a third-person perspective. The game's levels generally begin with a motorcycle driving segment in which only forward movement is allowed and obstacles must be avoided by using ramps and powerslides. Impacts and collisions lead to either a checkpoint reset (the screen fades and the player is sent backward to the last clear stretch of road) or death. Combat can also occur in these segments, consisting of quick-time event melee attacks, shooting from a sidecar while an AI companion drives, or getting close enough to allow an AI companion to shoot.

The main levels generally consist of a mixture of third-person, cover-based shooter, and beat 'em up gameplay. These levels are linear, usually guarded by several lower-level enemies with a high-ranking Devil's Hand member serving as the boss enemy at the end. The player can use a variety of guns and melee weapons, as well as throwing knives and dynamite. Unarmed combat actions include guard breaking, countering enemy attacks, context kills with environmental objects, and quick-time events based on instant takedowns. Weapons and ammunition can be scavenged from defeated enemies.

Between levels, the player can roam a small section of Dead End to sell drugs and buy weapons, moves, and motorcycle customization. Notably, despite a large amount of the city being modeled and detailed, any attempt to exit the small playable section results in a fade-reset similar to that of the driving segments. Also notable is that civilian NPCs are animated, but cannot be spoken to or killed, despite the game's warning against harming such NPCs.

== Plot ==
In 1969, Vietnam veteran Jake Conway returns to his home town of Dead End and his family of bikers, comprising his uncle Mack and brother Mikey. The latter is infatuated with his college friend and tutor, Ellie, and leaves angered when Mack refuses to allow him to go to a concert with her. Jake goes after Mikey, and after consoling him, they go to a diner. Outside, Mikey is confronted by the Devil's Hand biker gang, which includes members Colt, Meathook, and Anvil. Colt recognizes the emblem on Mikey's jacket as of that of a rival gang's, Retribution. After chasing them, the Devil's Hand hold the brothers at gunpoint and Meathook threatens Mikey's life, forcing Jake to reveal the jacket was their father's, William Conway. Meathook kills Mikey, and Jake is shot and left for dead by Colt.

Jake survives and swears vengeance on the Devil's Hand. Mack helps Jake find Anvil in San Alfonso, who flees to an abandoned brewery. Jake goes to Army Officer Tyrell for weapons, before returning to the brewery with Mack and killing Anvil after a chase. Ellie contacts Jake and tells him about Dr. Blotter, a drug dealer who deals with Colt. Blotter sends him to Fogwood to meet with Colt's lover, Naomi. There, Jake saves Naomi from some loggers, the two have sex, and she discloses Colt is at Seven Wells Ranch.

Jake enters the ranch, but Colt escapes to Airplane Cemetery. There, Jake wounds Colt, and tells him to remember Mikey's name before killing him. Jake locates Meathook at an illegal boxing ring, and enters the ring to interrogate him on why the Devil's Hand wanted him and Mikey dead; however, fellow Devil's Hand member Greasy Steve kills Meathook. Jake tracks down Greasy Steve, leading to a deadly race between the two. Jake wins and interrogates Greasy Steve, gaining information on his superior, Pretty Boy, before killing him. Pretty Boy's right-hand man Triple 6 attacks Jake at Dead End to kill him, but Mack helps Jake repel Triple 6, who escapes.

Mack tells Jake that Triple 6 is based at Fogwood Silverfalls sawmill. After interrogating a logger, Jake finds and follows Triple 6 to the sawmill and kills him. He later helps prostitutes in his search for Pretty Boy, leading him to King Dick at an abandoned church. Jake subdues King Dick and interrogates him for Pretty Boy's location. King Dick tells Jake to find Brandy, Pretty Boy's Girlfriend and Lieutnant before Jake kills him. Jake meets with Brandy and earns her trust by winning races and stealing a bike for her to give to Pretty Boy; Jake has Tyrell attach hidden explosives to the bike to draw out Pretty Boy. Brandy takes the bike as Jake and Mack intercept the two and capture Pretty Boy. During his interrogation, Pretty Boy tells Jake that William is dead and that there was a kill order on him and his family by the Gang's leader, Caesar; Jake then kills Pretty Boy.

At Mikey's grave, Mack tells Jake that William and Caesar, whose real name is John McKenzie, were members of the same gang. William won Jake and Mikey's mother in a race, but later incurred heavy debts, leading him to gamble her in a race against Caesar. William lost but refused to honor their agreement and fled with his partner from an enraged Caesar and gave his young sons to Mack, swearing him to secrecy. A concealed bomb in Mikey's grave explodes, injuring Mack. Jake returns him to Dead End and Ellie, before helping return a stolen shipment of Tyrell's. Meanwhile, the Devil's Hand assault Dead End; Jake returns to find Mack killed and Ellie captured. Travelling to Caesar's compound, Jake frees Ellie as Caesar reveals that she is his daughter, who ran away to escape his physical abuse. Caesar also confirms that he had hunted down and killed Jake's parents. Jake confronts Caesar, who flees on his bike. During the chase, Jake sends Caeser over a cliff and causes his bike to explode, killing him. Jake walks away from the scene with Ellie.

== Development ==
Deep Silver Vienna planned to use a film-style production model to develop this game together with Eutechnyx, a Gateshead-based independent games studio, as well as several other contributors.

It was originally conceived as an open-world game, allowing the driving of a large range of motorbikes and cars and various forms of combat (hand-to-hand and with guns, both on foot and on a bike) through the deserts and towns of late-1960s California. Concept art was provided for the lead characters by Massive Black. A story was written, dialogue recorded, and cut scenes completely motion-captured for this first incarnation of the game, and much of the vehicles, world, and locations were created (at least to an early stage) over the several years it was in development.

Ride to Hell: Retribution was originally announced in 2008, as Ride to Hell and due for release in 2009 according to an early trailer. The game was removed from Deep Silver's website. Development continued at Eutechnyx without the involvement of Deep Silver Vienna (which was closed down in early 2010) and the design was heavily revised, losing the open-world elements of the game and splitting it into several titles.

In February 2013, the game was classified R18+ by the Australian Classification Board signalling that the game may be headed for release. In March, another ACB classification was filed with the name "Cook's Mad Recipe", also sharing the same file number and numerous other details as the previous classification but this name was to be applied to downloadable content planned to be available for the game on or after launch.

In April, Ride to Hell resurfaced as three games sharing the same theme and branding: Ride to Hell: Retribution on PlayStation 3, Xbox 360, and Windows, a beat-em-up with a biker theme, handled by Eutechnyx and released on 25 June in North America, 28 June in Europe, and 4 July in Australia; Ride to Hell: Route 666 on PSN (PlayStation 3) and XBLA (Xbox 360), focusing on road combat, and handled by Black Forest Games; and Ride to Hell: Beatdown, aimed at mobile platforms.

== Reception ==
Reception

Aggregate score
Aggregator	Score
Metacritic	(X360) 19/100 (PC) 16/100 (PS3) 13/100

Review scores
Publication	Score
Electronic Gaming Monthly	0.5/10
Eurogamer	1/10
Game Informer	2/10
GameSpot	1/10
PlayStation Official Magazine – UK	1/10
Hardcore Gamer	1/5

Ride to Hell: Retribution has received "overwhelming dislike", according to the review aggregator website Metacritic. The site calculated weighted average ratings ranging between 13/100 and 19/100, depending on the platform. It has been panned by critics for its gameplay, graphics, voice acting, writing, artificial intelligence (AI), numerous bugs and glitches, and use of a linear structure instead of the originally announced open world element. (Note: Attributed to multiple sources:)

EGM said: "Other games may have offered less content for more money or come up shorter in specific, individual areas, but I don't think there's ever been a game that does so many things so universally poorly". The site rated it 0.5, with no positive remarks about the gameplay. Dan Ryckert of Game Informer said that "with the exception of some Kinect and Wii games that flat-out don't work, this is the worst video game I've played within this console generation". Daniel Starkey of GameSpot gave the game 1/10, calling it a "hideous, slapped-together action game saturated with poor, nonsensical design choices". It became the second game after Big Rigs: Over the Road Racing (2003) to get GameSpot's lowest possible score.

Steve Hannley of Hardcore Gamer gave the game 1/5, calling it "an offensive abomination of a game". Eurogamer rated the game 1/10. Reviewer Cara Ellison criticized the game's portrayal of women: "...women are completely, totally, transparently, a resource in this game". The treatment of women was also raised in Phil Iwaniuk's review for PlayStation Official Magazine – UK. Iwaniuk called the game "obnoxiously misogynistic".

Ben "Yahtzee" Croshaw of The Escapist called it "explosively, apocalyptically bad" in his Zero Punctuation review of the game, but drew a comparison to Plan 9 from Outer Space (1957), explaining that the game's issues were entertaining enough to warrant a purchase. He later refused to place it in his listing of 2013's worst games because he considered it a "congealed failure" rather than a game, instead awarding it his "Lifetime Achievement Award for Total Abhorrence", explaining that "releasing every box with no disc inside would have been less of a mistake". He later refused to rank it among his worst games of the decade in a similar fashion.

Giant Bomb awarded it the Worst Game of 2013.
