= Warhammer 40,000: Storm of Vengeance =

2014 video game

- Developer: Eutechnyx
- Publisher: Eutechnyx
- Series: Warhammer 40,000
- Platforms: Microsoft Windows, iOS, Android
- Release: April 3, 2014; Android; April 22, 2014
- Genre: Real-time strategy
- Modes: Single-player, multiplayer

Warhammer 40,000: Storm of Vengeance is a real-time strategy video game developed and published by Eutechnyx. It was released for Microsoft Windows, iOS and Android. It was set in the Warhammer 40,000 universe, it follows the Dark Angels, commanded by Grand Master Belial, and the Bad Moons, commanded by Ork Warlord Ghazghkull Thraka on the planet Piscina IV. It was released on April 3, 2014 for Windows and iOS, and on April 22, 2014 for Android.

== Gameplay ==
In-game screenshot of a skirmish match

Warhammer 40,000: Storm of Vengeance is a lane based strategy game, where the players must place 5 buildings on their side of the map, in order to produce resources and to produce units (called 'cards'). The player must then capture 3 enemy lanes, by killing enemy units and destroying the enemy buildings at the end of each lane. Between levels, the player has the option to upgrade units, giving units access to new weapons and abilities - however, by upgrading units, their costs also increase. Both the Dark Angels and the Bad Moons have their own campaigns and are playable in skirmish and multiplayer matches.

Each faction has 2 resources. The Dark Angels have their redemption resource and resolve resource. The redemption resource is used to produce basic units, such as; Tactical Space Marines, Assault Marines and Devastators. Whilst resolve is used to produce; Dreadnaughts and Ravenwings, it is also used to use unique in-battle abilities. Whilst the Orks produce teef, the standard resource for all ork units and the Ork faction also makes use of the 'warp' resource, which is used to grant special abilities from the Weirdboy Tower.

== Setting ==
The game is set in the Warhammer 40,000 universe, a dystopian vision of the future. Humanity has forged a galaxy-spanning empire, The Imperium, with the Immortal Emperor as humanity's leader and a living god. The Imperium is in a state of constant war with the Orks along with other alien races (often referred to as xenos) and their arch enemy, the forces of Chaos. Warhammer 40,000: Storm of Vengeance takes place on Piscina IV as Grand Master Belial and Ork Warlord Ghazghkull Thraka fight for control of the planet.

== Reception ==
Reception

Aggregate score
Aggregator	Score	
Aggregator	iOS	PC
Metacritic	58/100	33/100

Review scores
Publication	Score	
Publication	iOS	PC
4Players	30%	25%
Eurogamer	N/A	3/10
Gamezebo	2.5/5	2.5/5
PC Gamer (UK)	N/A	32%
Pocket Gamer	2.5/5	N/A
Digital Spy	3/5	N/A
The Escapist	N/A	2/5

The iOS version received "mixed" reviews, while the PC version received "unfavorable" reviews, according to the review aggregation website Metacritic.

Eurogamer described the PC version as having a "complete lack of AI" as units are "compelled to keep moving forwards, even if that means walking right past an enemy in a shuffling conga line" and that the game is really "about watching construction bars fill up and health bars go down, over and over again". Eurogamer summarized by calling it a "small and fussy" game that "takes its gameplay pretty much wholesale from Eutechnyx's own 2013 iOS game Ninja Cats vs Samurai Dogs".

AppSpy stated that the iOS version was "repetitive, but engaging enough tower defence game, that makes fair use of its 40K licence", praising the game for its "huge range of technology trees", but stating that "some long winded tutorials in place to ensure you are never unaware of a unit's abilities". The review summarised saying that the game has "intuitive controls may be undermined on small screens, but complexity and flexibility they allow make it a fair compromise", but went on to say, "there's no ignoring the fact that this is a reskin of the developer's previous game".

Pocket Gamer started by stating if the reader is "expecting an accurate digital conversion or even a loving tribute" to the Warhammer 40,000 franchise then "you're out of luck" and if "you're not bothered about the franchise and are just after a satisfyingly meaty strategy game" then "you're out of luck as well". The reviewer picked up on the variation in gameplay with abilities such as "the commander abilities that help inspire surrounding troops, or the melee class's ability to rocket over to another lane", but stated that gameplay is still "somewhat constrained by the compact nature of the battles". Ultimately, Pocket Gamer summarised saying that the iOS version is a game "that's a bit of a grind to play for more than an hour or so".
