= Mob Rules =

Mob Rules may refer to:

- Mob Rules (band), a German power metal band
- Mob Rules (album), an album by Black Sabbath
  - "The Mob Rules", the title track on the album
- "Mob Rules" (House episode)

== See also ==
- Mob Rule (disambiguation)
