= Auto Club Revolution =

2013 video game

- Logo for Auto Club Revolution
- Publisher: Eutechnyx
- Platform: Windows
- Release: April 2013
- Genre: Racing

Auto Club Revolution was a free PC online simulation racing game. The game was published by Eutechnyx and was developed in collaboration with motor brands such as BMW and Renault. It was announced in early 2011 and officially launched at the end of April in 2013, followed by a Chinese release in November 2013.

In April 2012, Eutechnyx partnered with Stryking Entertainment GmbH to produce a localized version of the Auto Club Revolution website in Germany. The launch was followed up with a further territory push in 2013 in a partnership deal with MegaFon and Vimpelcom bringing another localized version of the game's website to Russian markets.

== Beta Testing ==
=== Closed Beta Testing ===
Eutechnyx launched a Closed Beta Test on July 25, 2011, the first phase of Beta testing. Only selected applicants were able to try the game. Included was the Workshop and a car modification program where the player could customize their cars in a web-based interface.

=== Open Beta Testing ===
A few months later, Eutechnyx officially announced the Open Beta and rewarded Closed Beta testers with free items in their Open Beta accounts.

Open Beta, unlike Closed Beta, required no beta key to register an account. This opened testing up for global players. Launched in this program were the in-game currency, E-Bucks, which can only be obtained through paying real-world money and are used along with credits to purchase items on the website such as unique cars, cosmetic upgrades and Credit Multipliers. Also new in Open Beta were a number of new racing elements including wet weather, AI racing and the team based racing tool Auto Clubs.

=== ACR 2.0 ===
On June 16, 2014, Auto Club Revolution went into a closed alpha state, requiring users to sign up for the "ACR 2.0".

== Game play ==
=== Features ===
Auto Club Revolution consists of a variety of racetracks. Tracks include Daytona International Speedway, the Indianapolis Motor Speedway road course, Circuit de Spa-Francorchamps and fantasy racetracks.

The game includes a variety of cars, ranging from vehicles like the Ford Focus ST and Opel Corsa OPC to supercars such as the Ford GT.

== Online Community ==
The game features a community set up like a social network, where players can interact with other players, moderators and game masters, and personalize their profiles in unique ways, including sharing information from their favorite cars to their favorite driving music. Players can join Auto Clubs which act as clans, or guilds, whereby players can join like minded, or equally skilled drivers to complete challenges together and receive team rewards. Also featured in the community atmosphere is a “Beat the Devs” contest, where players can race those who are developing the game.
