= Crisis Beat =

1998 video game

- Developer: Soft Machine
- Publishers: EU: Studio 3; JP: Bandai
- Platform: PlayStation
- Release: 1998
- Genre: Beat-em-up
- Modes: Single-player, multiplayer

Crisis Beat is a 1998 video game for the Sony PlayStation, developed by Japanese studio Soft Machine. It is a beat-em-up style game. The story is set on a cruise liner where terrorists hijack the ship and the player must pick a pair of characters to fight back.

== Gameplay ==
It is a beat-em-up style game in full 3D. The player can choose between two pairs of characters to play as. Stages consist of the player fighting various waves of enemies primarily in hand to hand combat and moving to the next stage once every enemy has been defeated.

== Release ==
The game was released for July 18, 1998 for the Sony PlayStation.

== Reception ==
Reception

Review scores
Publication	Score
Famitsu	23/40
Play	45%
Super GamePower	8.0/10
Mega Fun	78/100
Video Games	66/100
Playmania	5/10
Gamers	3.5/5
PSX Extreme	6/10
Fun Generation	6/10

It was released on June 18, 1998 for the Sony PlayStation in Japan, and in 2000 in Europe. It was re-released in 2013 on PlayStation Network.
