= C3 Racing =

1998 racing video game

- European cover art
- Developer: Eutechnyx
- Publisher: Infogrames Multimedia
- Platform: PlayStation
- Release: EU: 10 December 1998; EU: 15 January 1999
- Genre: Racing game
- Modes: Single-player, multiplayer

C3 Racing: Car Constructors Championship, released in Britain as Max Power Racing as a tie-in to the Max Power magazine, is a racing video game first released in December 1998, developed by Eutechnyx and published by Infogrames Multimedia for the PlayStation. The game allows the player to race in 11 locations around the world in a variety of licensed sports cars. It is the follow-up to 1997's Total Drivin.

== Gameplay ==
Gameplay screenshot

The game can be played by either one or two players in split-screen. In Arcade mode the player races on all 31 tracks in the game, unlocking new and more powerful cars with every two victories. In the beginning of the game the player races in either Africa or Peru in either a Nissan Micra or a Renault Clio. These are separate tangents that unlock separate countries to each other.

If the player finishes first on all three tracks in Africa then they will unlock the Chinese tracks, and they finish first on those tracks then they will unlock the Indonesia tracks. From here, the US tracks are unlocked followed by the Brazilian tracks. After unlocking the Brazilian tracks no more tracks can be unlocked in this tangent.

As for the Peru tangent, finishing 1st unlocks the Rome tracks, followed by Norway, Monaco and the United Kingdom. After unlocking all available GTI cars during the course of the Arcade Mode the choice of cars will change to High Performance Class, starting as with the GTI Class with two cars to choose from. If the players have finished all the 31 tracks, they will be able to race on all the tracks reversed.

In championship mode, the player races in four championship classes, with pre-determined circuits for racing on.

== American localization ==
In North America, the game was rethemed and renamed as TNN Motorsports Hardcore TR by publisher ASC Games, which featured different cars, but had similar tracks (relocated to locations within the United States) and menus to C3 Racing.

== Reception ==
British magazine Play rated the game 75%. The reviewer praised the cars, handling and track scenery, but was critical of graphics and plain looking licensed cars, concluding that Max Power Racing is "good fun, but no front runner". Pete Wilton of the Official UK PlayStation Magazine rated it 7 out of 10, saying that the game "feels unfinished" and being critical of the cars appearing "blocky and badly drawn". German magazine MANiAC rated it 76%. French magazine Joypad rated C3 Racing 5 out of 10, commenting that it is enjoyable but ultimately brings nothing new to the racing genre. Its editors, Rahan and Trazom, wrote that with TOCA 2: Touring Cars coming out at the same time, and with the existing hits Gran Turismo and Colin McRae Rally, it makes it difficult to choose C3 Racing. JeuxVideo.com rated it 15 out of 20, writing that it is a "good racing game that has the advantage of being very fast".
