= Big Mutha Truckers 2: Truck Me Harder =

2005 video game

- Developer: Eutechnyx
- Publishers: EU: Empire Interactive; NA: THQ
- Series: Big Mutha Truckers
- Platforms: PlayStation 2, Xbox, Microsoft Windows
- Release: PlayStation 2 & Xbox: EU: 24 June 2005; NA: 23 August 2005; Microsoft Windows: NA: 23 August 2005; EU: 26 August 2005
- Genre: Racing
- Mode: Single-player

Big Mutha Truckers 2: Truck Me Harder is a 2005 racing video game developed by Eutechnyx for PlayStation 2, Xbox and Microsoft Windows. It is the sequel to the 2002 game Big Mutha Truckers.

== Gameplay ==
Like the previous game, Big Mutha Truckers 2 follows Ma Jackson and her children in their exploits running a haulage company and trading goods to raise enough money to hire a lawyer to get 'Ma' off the hook for tax evasion. The game has the player driving between towns, purchasing goods for cheap and delivering them to a different town, where the price is higher, to make a profit. The game also includes side missions, where the player drives other vehicles such as an SUV or pickup truck.

== Reception ==
Reception

Aggregate score
Aggregator	Score		
Aggregator	PC	PS2	Xbox
Metacritic	44/100	51/100	50/100

Review scores
Publication	Score		
Publication	PC	PS2	Xbox
Edge	4/10	4/10	4/10
Eurogamer	N/A	6/10	N/A
Game Informer	N/A	6.75/10	6.75/10
GameSpot	N/A	4.8/10	4.8/10
GameSpy	2/5	N/A	N/A
GameZone	N/A	5.2/10	5.6/10
IGN	5.5/10	5.5/10	5.5/10
Official U.S. PlayStation Magazine	N/A	3/5	N/A
Official Xbox Magazine (US)	N/A	N/A	4.1/10
PC Gamer (US)	46%	N/A	N/A
Detroit Free Press	N/A	N/A	2/4
The Times	2/5	2/5	2/5

The PlayStation 2 and Xbox versions of Big Mutha Truckers 2: Truck Me Harder received "mixed" reviews, while the PC version received "unfavorable" reviews according to video game review aggregator Metacritic.

Detroit Free Press gave the Xbox version a score of two stars out of four and stated: "The action is respectable when you're on the road with your 18-wheeler, dodging UFO invaders, smacking sinister bikers with your trailer and outrunning the cops, but the bare-bones production value is clear when you visit towns. You go to stores and bars to buy upgrades, meet people and find your next load to haul." The Sydney Morning Herald gave the PS2 version a score of two-and-a-half stars out of five and said, "Causing havoc behind the wheel of a big rig is fun but the novelty quickly wanes and the unsubtle gags often fail to amuse, especially when they are endlessly repeated." The Times gave the game two stars out of five and said that "The fact that the graphics are so impressive, and the road maps so brilliantly extensive, only adds to the disappointment of the overall experience." Maxim gave it a score of two out of ten and stated that "it ain't nuthin' we ain't seen before. When not running from the cops a la "Driver," you're making deliveries like in "Crazy Taxi"—both of which would be a lot more fun if your rig wasn't slow and sluggish like Eminem with his medicine."
