= Constructor (video game) =

1997 video game

- PC box art
- Developer: System 3
- Publishers: Acclaim Entertainment; System 3 (re-released & HD)
- Designer: Phil Thornton (English version)
- Platforms: MS-DOS; Microsoft Windows; Mac OS; PlayStation; PlayStation 4; Xbox One; Nintendo Switch
- Release: 1997: MS-DOS; NA: October 3, 1997; EU: 1997 PlayStation, Mac OS; EU: 1998 Microsoft Windows; NA: 1998; EU: 1998; WW: May 26, 2017 (HD) PlayStation 4, Xbox One; WW: May 26, 2017 (HD) Nintendo Switch; WW: February 28, 2019 (Plus)
- Genres: Real-time strategy, Construction and management simulation
- Modes: Single-player, multiplayer

Constructor is a 1997 video game released originally for MS-DOS computers and later ported to the PlayStation and macOS It was developed by System 3 and published by Acclaim Entertainment.

In the game, packed with humorous undertones, the player controls a construction company in a map split between several estates, and must deal with other teams to win the game.

On July 31, 2015, System 3 announced that Constructor was getting an HD re-release on consoles and PC in 2016, but it was delayed to May 26, 2017.

== Gameplay ==
The player controls a construction company, and aim to drive the other players out of business. Using teams of workers and foremen, the player must build facilities to manufacture building materials (a sawmill, concrete works, etc.), in order to build houses (ranging from simple wooden cabins to large mansions) in which to house tenants who pay rent and thus fund the company, as well as producing new workers, tenants and other characters. Along the way, the player can build homes for undesirables such as gangsters and hippies, who work to undermine the enemy.

== Development ==
Constructor's development was first revealed in a January 1991 issue of The One, where the player's role was described as "You play an architect on a planet subject to freak weather conditions. Like Jupiter it has a huge red spot which revolves every hundred years flattening everything in its path. While not being good news for most of the inhabitants of the planet it is very good news for you and your fellow architects ... From your sophisticated office console you control the planning and building of building of new properties and then attract the right sort of tenants to them." More information regarding Constructor was to be announced in the first quarter of 1992, but its development was delayed.

Fergus McGovern of Probe Entertainment said in 1997, "[Constructor] was a project that we'd been after for a long time, but it was originally with Warner. When they were going through some problems, we jumped in and snapped it up. We've been working on it ever since."

== Releases ==
The game was originally released for MS-DOS computers in 1997.

=== Ports ===
The game was later ported to the PlayStation, Mac OS and Windows-native DirectX 3.

On January 14, 2010, System 3 Software re-released Constructor for Sony PSP and PS3 systems in Europe via the PlayStation Network.

A remake of the original was heading to tablets and other platforms in 2013. On March 29, 2013, it was announced that Constructor would make a return and also debut on tablets.

A HD version of Constructor was announced by System 3 on July 31, 2015. It was originally planned to be released on January 29, 2016, but was delayed six times. It was first delayed until April 29, 2016, then postponed to late summer 2016, January 31, 2017, February 28, 2017, April 28, 2017 with a new projected date of May 26, 2017, on PC, PS4 and Xbox One, with a Nintendo Switch version to be released later in the year. The delays with the release were attributed to new features being added to enrich the gameplay, as the game's development progressed.

The Nintendo Switch version, Constructor Plus, was eventually released in 2019.

== Reception ==
Reception

Review score
Publication	Score
PC PowerPlay	84%

== Sequel ==
Constructor II was announced in April 1998; it would have players visiting the wasteland of an alien planet. The sequel maintained the style of humor present in the original, bringing back a cast of characters from the first game. New characters based on the alien theme were also added, including the Alien Egg which impregnates victims, later causing their guts to explode. Constructor Space was previewed years after the game was announced but was never completed. It was mentioned on June 29, 2016, as a possible sequel to Constructor if the HD re-release was successful.

The sequel Constructor Plus was released on May 27, 2019, and features planets as playable maps alongside missions.

Mob Rule (known as Constructor: Street Wars or Street Wars: Constructor Underworld in some regions) was released in 1999, but failed to achieve the same success of the first game.
