= Putty (video game) =

1992 video game

- Amiga cover art
- Developer: System 3
- Publishers: System 3 U.S. Gold; Varie (JP)
- Designers: Phil Thornton; Richard Joseph
- Programmers: Dan Phillips; Dave Collins; Rob Stevens
- Platforms: Amiga, CD32, Super NES
- Release: 1992: Amiga; 1993: SNES; 1994: CD32
- Genre: Platform
- Mode: Single-player

Putty (also known as Silly Putty or Look Out It's...Putty) is a game developed by System 3 and released in 1992 for the Amiga. It was also released on the Super Nintendo Entertainment System in 1993 as Super Putty (Putty Moon (パティームーン, Patī Mūn) in Japan) and Amiga CD32 version was published in 1994 under the same name.

== Plot ==
Putty Moon, the place where Putty lives, has been taken over by an evil wizard named Dazzledaze. Dazzledaze planned to capture the Putties and ship them to Earth as gum. To save his friends and oust the evil wizard, Billy Putty enlists the help of some robots ("bots") to build a skyscraper that will reach up to Putty Moon.

== Gameplay ==
In Putty, the player controls a blue blob with eyes. Putty has many moves that he could use to attack enemies or to navigate around the level. These abilities include being able to stretch out upwards, downwards, left and right to access far-off ledges. He also has the ability to inflate. This allows him to provide a cushioned landing for any falling bots. Over-inflation also acts as a "smart bomb", with Putty bursting, killing all of the enemies on the screen, whilst reducing his health in the process.

Putty is able to form part of himself into a fist, allowing him to punch left or right to dispatch enemies.

Putty is also able to melt into the floor, making him invulnerable and also allowing him to absorb enemies, recovering a small amount of health in the process. With certain enemies in the game, such as the clockwork orange, once Putty has absorbed one he is then able to morph into the enemy's shape to use its abilities.

A final ability of Putty's is being able to create a mug of coffee from part of himself, which will distract bots and make them stand still.

The levels in Putty are laid out vertically, with the screen scrolling up and down. The levels contain regular platforms, as well as "solid" ledges that Putty can not move through, and other special tiles including electric platforms and bounce pads.

The aim of each level is to rescue a set number of bots within the time limit. In the early sections of the game, the bots simply stand around the level. Putty has to absorb them, and carry them to the level's goal (either a flying saucer or an elevator). Later on in the game, the bots will jump around platforms, often falling to their death.

Invariably each level also contains various enemies. These enemies include Terminator carrots, Scouse sausages and sword-wielding spacemen. The enemies will attempt to hurt Putty in various ways. The attacks from some of the enemies will also hurt any bots that Putty is carrying at the time. If a bot is hurt four times it is killed, causing the player to have to find another bot to absorb.

Putty is also able to use powerups that are scattered around each level. These range from simple points bonuses to temporary invulnerability, to Uncle Ted. Once this latter powerup is collected, a man with a Hammond Organ named Uncle Ted appears, and proceeds to play a tune, causing all of the enemies in the level to freeze.

A voice clip of Wally Maher as Screwy Squirrel in the character's debut short Screwball Squirrel can be heard as one of the voice lines of Putty's nemesis Dweezil the cat.

== Legacy ==
The sequel Putty Squad was initially only released for Super NES and only in PAL territories. It features Putty fighting alongside nemesis Dweezil the cat against other mischievous enemies to rescue other red putties. It also features a two-player mode, with the second player taking control of a red putty. Versions of the game were completed and reviewed, but not published, for the Amiga and the Sega Mega Drive, with only a demo version for the Amiga being released on two magazine covermounts. The complete Amiga version was finally released in December 2013 as a free Christmas gift from System 3, available on their website. The Mega Drive version was also released in October 2015 by a Sega-16 user who get hold of a working prototype. An MS-DOS version was also projected by System 3 and a demo version was released on magazine disks, but in the end this version was not even finished by the developer. A new version of Putty Squad was released for PSVita, PS4, PS3, 3DS, Windows 8 and Xbox Live Arcade in 2013 and 2014. The HD port of this version was released for Nintendo Switch in November 2017. The remake received mixed to negative reviews from critics.

In Retro Gamer issue 39 published in 2008 Mark Cale stated that he would be bringing the Putty series to the Nintendo DS and PlayStation Portable. He said that System 3 were looking to bring a new game to the systems rather than a port of the two existing games, but the games were never released or revealed.

On September 16, 2026, a reimagining titled Putty World was announced for the Nintendo Switch 2, planned for release in 2027.
