= Grooverider: Slot Car Thunder =

2003 video game

- Xbox cover art
- Developer: King of the Jungle
- Publishers: NA: Encore; EU: Play It
- Director: Jolyon Myers
- Designer: Robert Churchill
- Platforms: GameCube, Xbox, PlayStation 2
- Release: GameCube, Xbox: NA: 25 September 2003; PlayStation 2: EU: 28 January 2005
- Genre: Racing
- Modes: Single-player, multiplayer

Grooverider: Slot Car Thunder (known in Europe as Grooverider: Slot Car Racing) is a racing video game released in 2003, developed by British studio King of the Jungle. It features a selection of over 40 fictional slot cars and 5 locations set in a virtual house. The gameplay features changing lanes to avoid obstacles or overtake, 3 performance levels of cars and power-ups.

== Reception ==
Reception

Aggregate score
Aggregator	Score	
Aggregator	GameCube	Xbox
Metacritic	49/100	45/100

Review scores
Publication	Score	
Publication	GameCube	Xbox
Game Informer	N/A	2/10
GameSpot	N/A	4/10
GameZone	N/A	5.8/10
IGN	4.5/10	4.5/10
Nintendo Power	2.6/5	N/A
TeamXbox	N/A	5.7/10
X-Play	N/A	2/5

The GameCube and Xbox versions received "generally unfavorable reviews" according to the review aggregation website Metacritic.
