= Zybex =

1988 video game

- Publisher: Zeppelin Games
- Programmers: Atari 8-bit Brian Jobling; Commodore 64; Kevin Franklin
- Composer: Adam Gilmore
- Platforms: Atari 8-bit, Commodore 64, ZX Spectrum
- Release: 1988
- Genre: Scrolling shooter
- Modes: Single-player, multiplayer

Zybex is a 1988 horizontally scrolling shooter for the Commodore 64, Atari 8-bit computers, and ZX Spectrum. Zybex was one of the first games released by Zeppelin Games, a UK-based budget game developer.

== Plot ==
The player takes the role of two convicts, Rinser and Cassalana, escaping from an execution in intergalactic prison. To buy their freedom, the convicts must collect tokens to open later levels by destroying the big end of level bosses. There are 16 levels, with a choice of "open" levels when one is completed. First level, Arcturus, is always the first level to be played. The last level is called Zybex. Two players can play simultaneously in all versions.

== Gameplay ==
Firing is automatic - the fire button changes the current weapon. Collecting a weapon icon increases that weapon's power level, up to the maximum of 4. Dying reduces the current weapon by 1 power level, or removes a weapon if it has only one power level. The players start with level 1 Orbiter (and never lose it), the other four weapons are 8-way (starts as 2-way, upgrades to 4-way, 6-way and then 8-way), Rail-gun (solid beam which gets stronger), Pulse (upgrades to include diagonal fire) and Wall (starts with a narrow field and gets larger).

Gameplay screenshot
