= American Tag-Team Wrestling =

1992 video game

- European cover art (Amiga version)
- Developer: Zeppelin Games
- Publisher: Zeppelin Games
- Composer: Adam McCrory
- Platforms: Amiga; Commodore 64; ZX Spectrum; Amstrad CPC
- Release: Amiga: NA: 1992; EU: 1992
- Genre: Sports
- Modes: Single-player, multiplayer

American Tag-Team Wrestling is a 1992 professional wrestling video game that was released for multiple platforms. The storyline surrounds a tag team tournament. Each tag team is trying to win the tag team championship belt by taking down all possible opponents.

== Gameplay ==
The style of wrestling used in the game is the tag team wrestling practiced during the 1980s professional wrestling boom. Players can tag in their partner if they are weakened; wrestlers slowly recover outside of the ring for future play. Single matches and King of the Ring-style tournaments can be played. Some of the wrestlers are based on real World Wrestling Federation (WWF) wrestlers such as Macho Man Randy Savage, Hulk Hogan and The Missing Link. Each tag team consists of two team members who contradict each other; forcing players to analyze each other's strengths and weaknesses. While they look different on the character select screen, both tag team partners have an identical appearance on the ZX Spectrum version of the game.

A vast selection of kicks, punches and grapples can be used in order to outwit the competition. However, only seven are officially indicated in the ZX Spectrum manual. Each round is timed, similar to boxing and unlike the actual WWF matches of that era. There are also grudge matches that randomly appear after every tournament bout in addition to referee decisions that can go either way.

Both players share the same screen while playing the game; allow both players to see each other without any distractions from a split screen. While the game was released two years after WrestleMania VI which ended the 1980s wrestling boom; it is acknowledged that a lot of the characteristics are based on the family-friendly style of wrestling performed during the 1980s.
