= The Psychotron =

1994 video game

- Developer: The Multimedia Store
- Publisher: Merit Software
- Platform: Windows
- Release: 1994

The Psychotron is a 1994 video game from Merit Software.

== Gameplay ==
The Psychotron is a Cold War-era techno-thriller, where Soviet desperation meets psychic warfare and CIA black-budget intrigue. After the mysterious crash of a plane smuggling a mind-control device—known as the Psychotronic Generator—into the U.S., the player assumes the role of a government agent tasked with recovering the device and uncovering the conspiracy behind its disappearance. The game unfolds across seven scenes, blending rendered video pans of new locations with two styles of gameplay: point-and-click exploration and dialogue-driven interviews. During exploration, players examine hot spots—such as answering machines and filing cabinets—to gather fragmented evidence. In the interrogation sequences, players question characters using menu-based prompts. Success depends on selecting the right questions to keep conversations productive. Multiplayer mode allows players to alternate scenes, competing for points to control the final act.

== Reception ==
Reception

Review scores
Publication	Score
Aktueller Software Markt	10/12
Computer Gaming World	2/5
Entertainment Weekly	C
PC Player	36/100
Power Play	34%
PC Joker	46%

Entertainment Weekly gave the game a C rating, saying "Save your dimes and play computer solitaire instead".
