= Strike Force Bowling =

2004 video game

- PAL region cover art
- Developer: LAB Rats Games
- Publishers: Enlight Software: NA: Crave Entertainment (PS2, Xbox, GCN); EU: Play-It
- Engine: RenderWare
- Platforms: Windows, GameCube, PlayStation 2, Xbox
- Release: Windows: NA: January 7, 2004 (Fast Lanes); PlayStation 2, Xbox: NA: May 10, 2004; PAL: March 25, 2005 (PS2); GameCube: NA: May 6, 2005
- Genre: Sports
- Modes: Single-player, multiplayer

Strike Force Bowling is a video game of the sports genre released in 2004 by LAB Rats. A previous game, Fast Lanes Bowling, was published by Enlight Software for Microsoft Windows. The two games are similar as they share the same physics engine and graphics, although Strike Force featured more locations as well as left-handed, and reverse-hook bowlers. LAB Rats assisted in the development of Brunswick Pro Bowling so the game has the same physics engine, but has a more fantasy-oriented theme. Strike Force features 14 places to Bowl (12 in Fast Lanes) and 8 Playable characters. There are only 7 locations, but each has its own "nighttime" variant which is unlocked as a secret stage. It also features Golf Mode, Challenge Mode, Skins, and Tournaments. There are also 14 different bowling balls to use, such as the Lightning, and level specific ones like the Bone Crasher and Pharaoh's Magic.

The Xbox version of the game supported the "Xbox Live aware" feature on Xbox Live. Strike Force Bowling is supported online on Insignia, a revival online server for original Xbox games.

== Reception ==
The Xbox version and Fast Lanes Bowling received "mixed" reviews, while the PlayStation 2 and GameCube versions received "generally unfavorable reviews", according to the review aggregation website Metacritic. TeamXbox gave the game a mixed review about two months before its U.S. release date.

Reception

Aggregate score
Aggregator	Score			
Aggregator	GameCube	PC	PS2	Xbox
Metacritic	47/100	51/100	48/100	54/100

Review scores
Publication	Score			
Publication	GameCube	PC	PS2	Xbox
Computer Games Magazine	N/A	2.5/5	N/A	N/A
Game Informer	N/A	N/A	5/10	5/10
GameSpot	5.2/10	5.2/10	5.2/10	5.2/10
GameZone	4/10	N/A	6.5/10	6.5/10
IGN	4/10	N/A	4/10	4/10
Nintendo Power	2.6/5	N/A	N/A	N/A
Official U.S. PlayStation Magazine	N/A	N/A	1.5/5	N/A
PC Gamer (US)	N/A	45%	N/A	N/A
TeamXbox	N/A	N/A	N/A	5.6/10
X-Play	N/A	N/A	2/5	N/A
