= Total Drivin =

1997 video game

- PAL cover art
- Developer: Eutechnyx
- Publishers: NA: Activision; EU: Ocean Software; JP: Atlus
- Platform: PlayStation
- Release: NA: October 6, 1997; EU: October 15, 1997; JP: April 23, 1998
- Genre: Racing
- Modes: Single-player, multiplayer

Total Drivin, known as Car & Driver Presents: Grand Tour Racing '98 in North America, Gekisou!!! Grand Racing (Note: (激走!! グランドレシング)) in Japan and as M6 Turbo Racing in France (as a tie-in to the M6 motoring show), is a 1997 racing video game developed by British company Eutechnyx exclusively for PlayStation, their first release under this name having previously been named Merit Studios. The game saw highly mixed reactions from critics due to its broad stylistic approach and unusual steering controls. It was followed up by C3 Racing released in Europe in 1998 and 1999.

== Gameplay ==
Gameplay screenshot

Total Drivin is a racing game that features six courses set in different locations across the world, each with different weather variations. The game supports the Dual Analog Controller. Multiplayer is available via both split screen and the PlayStation Link Cable.

== Development ==
Total Drivin was developed by the UK-based company Eutechnyx. The developers created a zoom-capable, 360 degree camera for use as a programming tool, but later decided to leave it in so that players could look over the track landscapes while the game is paused.

The game's North American publisher, Activision, acquired a Car and Driver sponsorship for the game, leading to "Car and Driver Presents" being added to the game's title in that region.

== Reception ==
Reception

Aggregate score
Aggregator	Score
GameRankings	71%

Review scores
Publication	Score
AllGame	3.5/5
CNET Gamecenter	4/10
Edge	8/10
Electronic Gaming Monthly	7/10
Famitsu	23/40
Game Informer	7.75/10
GameFan	86% (Note: In GameFan's viewpoint of the game, one critic gave it a score of 90, and the other two gave it each a score of 84.)
GameSpot	7/10
IGN	6/10
Next Generation	3/5
Official U.S. PlayStation Magazine	3/5
Playstation Plus	86%

The game received above-average reviews. In Japan, where the game was ported and published by Atlus under the name Gekisō!! Grand Racing: Total Drivin' (激走!! グランドレーシング Total Drivin', Gekisō!! Gurando Rēshingu Totaru Doraibin) on 23 April 1998, Famitsu gave it a score of 23 out of 40.

While Edge praised the game for successfully combining the realism of a racing simulator with the style of an arcade racing game, most reviews assessed that by taking on every single racing style in one game, Total Drivin failed to excel at any one style and came out highly inconsistent. Next Generation, for example, stated that "It's a nice idea, but for the most part, it's neither well-executed nor well-integrated into gameplay, and comes across like more of a gimmick than anything else." Both Next Generation and IGN remarked that most of the tracks are too easy, while the buggy tracks feature extremely difficult handling, making the challenge too uneven.

Some critics complimented the sound effects as realistic, while others found the engine sounds grating, likening them to motorcycles or blenders. The graphics also met with mixed reactions, with critics noting grainy bitmaps but a pleasing lack of pop-up. A few reviewers praised how the aggressive A.I. leads other cars to cut opponents off or push them into walls when going around curves. Kraig Kujawa of Electronic Gaming Monthly summarized that "With so much depth, GTR has something for all, despite its rough edges", and his co-reviewer Dean Hager similarly concluded, "In the end, the good elements outweigh the bad."

Gary Mollohan of Official U.S. PlayStation Magazine highlighted the game's selection of vehicles and large environments, noting that a single lap can take up to four minutes to complete. However, he criticized the game's questionable car physics and unconventional controls. IGN likewise found that the controls make the steering oversensitive. GameSpot reviewer Jeff Gerstmann felt the controls were decent, but admitted that they can take a lot of getting used to due to the game's unique steering system. GamePro summed up that "You'll either love using the D-pad in conjunction with the L and R triggers, or you'll hate it." (Note: GamePro gave the game two 4/5 scores for graphics and overall fun factor, and two 3.5/5 scores for sound and control in an early review.)
