= Sink or Swim (video game) =

1993 video game

- Developer: Odysseus Software (Note: Mega Drive and Game Gear versions developed by Zeppelin Games and Big Red Software respectively.)
- Publisher: Zeppelin Games (Note: Mega Drive and Game Gear versions published by Codemasters.)
- Designers: Andrew Drake; Anthony Gallop; Steven Wannell; Robert Tucker
- Platforms: MS-DOS, Amiga, Atari ST, Super NES, Mega Drive, Game Gear
- Release: 1993
- Genre: Puzzle
- Mode: Single-player

Sink or Swim is a puzzle video game that was released in 1993 for MS-DOS Developed by Odysseus Software and published by Zeppelin Games. It is similar in style to Lemmings. The game was ported to the Amiga and the Super Nintendo Entertainment System. Mega Drive and Game Gear versions were renamed to Man Overboard!.

== Plot ==
Players control Kevin Codner, the aquatic hero. After hearing that the SS Lucifer has suffered some sort of mishap (the exact nature of the incident is not made clear in the game; somehow the captain is shown pulling the plug from his bath, and a fountain of water shoots up and starts flooding the ship). Kevin gets into a yellow submarine and begins saving the passengers.

== Reception ==
Electronic Gaming Monthly gave the SNES version a 6.4 out of 10. They commented that the graphics could be better but that the gameplay is both strategic and addictive. GamePro took the reverse position, praising the graphics but criticizing the lack of multiplayer and concluding that the gameplay is not entertaining enough to captivate puzzle veterans.
