= System 3 (company) =

British video game developer and publisher

System 3 Software Limited
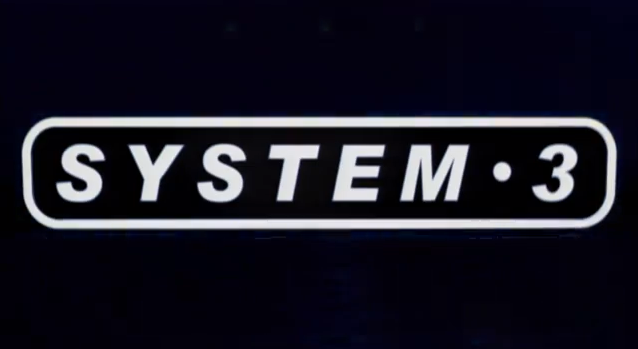
- Formerly: Studio 3 Interactive Entertainment Limited; (1999-2003)
- Type: Public
- Industry: Video games
- Founded: 1982; 44 years ago
- Founders: Mark Cale; Emerson Best; Michael Koo
- Headquarters: London, United Kingdom
- Key people: Mark Cale (CEO)
- Products: Last Ninja series International Karate series Constructor; Putty
- Website: system3.com

System 3 Software Limited (known as System 3 Software Ltd. until 1991 and Studio 3 Interactive Entertainment Ltd. from 1999 to 2003) is a British independent video game developer and publisher founded in 1982 by Mark Cale.

They created games such as The Last Ninja, Myth: History in the Making, International Karate, Putty, Constructor and its 1999 sequel Street Wars: Constructor Underworld (also known as Mob Rule) as well as dozens of other games.

Studio 3 was the internal development arm of System 3.

== Games ==
=== Games developed ===
Year	Title	Platform(s)
1982	Colony 7	Atari 8-bit
1983	Lazer Cycle	BBC Micro
1984	Death Star Interceptor	Commodore 64, ZX Spectrum
1985	International Karate	Commodore 64, ZX Spectrum, Atari 8-bit
1987	Bangkok Knights	Amiga, Atari ST, Commodore 64
1987	International Karate +	Amiga, Amstrad CPC, Atari ST, Commodore 64, ZX Spectrum
1987	The Last Ninja	Apple IIGS, Atari ST, Commodore 64, MS-DOS
1988	Last Ninja 2	Amstrad CPC, Commodore 64, ZX Spectrum
1989	Dominator	Amiga, Amstrad CPC, Atari ST, Commodore 64, ZX Spectrum
1989	Myth: History in the Making	Amiga, Amstrad CPC, Commodore 64, ZX Spectrum
1989	Tusker	Amiga, Amstrad CPC, Atari ST, Commodore 64, ZX Spectrum
1989	Vendetta	Amstrad CPC, Commodore 64, ZX Spectrum
1990	Flimbo's Quest	Amiga, Amstrad CPC, Atari ST, Commodore 64
1991	Fuzzball	Amiga
1991	Last Ninja 3	Amiga, Atari ST, Commodore 64
1991	Turbo Charge	Commodore 64
1992	Ferrari Grand Prix Challenge	Game Boy, NES
1992	Putty	Amiga, Super NES
1994	Putty Squad	Super NES
1997	Constructor	MacOS, Microsoft Windows, MS-DOS, PlayStation
1999	Mob Rule	Microsoft Windows
2000	International Karate 2000	Game Boy Color
2001	International Karate Advanced	Game Boy Advance
2006	Super Fruit Fall	Wii
2013	Putty Squad	Nintendo 3DS, PlayStation 3, PlayStation 4, PlayStation Vita
2017	Constructor HD	Microsoft Windows, PlayStation 4, Xbox One
2017	FruitFall Crush	Nintendo Switch
2019	Constructor Plus	Microsoft Windows, Nintendo Switch, PlayStation 4, Xbox One
2026	The James Pond Legacy: The Pond is Not Enough	Nintendo Switch 2

=== Games published ===
Year	Title	Platform(s)	Developer(s)	Notes
1985	Juice!	Commodore 64	Tronix	European publisher
1985	Suicide Strike	Commodore 64	Tronix	European publisher
1986	Twister	ZX Spectrum	Sensible Software	
1994	Desert Fighter	Super NES	Opus	European publisher
2000	Crisis Beat	PlayStation	Soft Machine	European publisher
2000	Guilty Gear	PlayStation	Arc System Works	European publisher
2000	Silent Bomber	PlayStation	CyberConnect	European publisher
2000	Toshinden 4	PlayStation	Tamsoft	European publisher
2002	Cel Damage Overdrive	PlayStation 2	Pseudo Interactive	European publisher
2003	Grooverider: Slot Car Racing	PlayStation 2	King of the Jungle	European publisher
2003	James Pond II: Codename Robocod	Game Boy Advance, Nintendo DS, PlayStation, PlayStation 2	Vectordean	European publisher
2003	Motorsiege: Warriors of Primetime	PlayStation 2	Lightspeed Games	
2003	Road Trip Adventure	PlayStation 2	E-game	European publisher
2003	Seek and Destroy	PlayStation 2	Barnhouse Effect	European publisher
2004	1945 I & II: The Arcade Games	PlayStation 2	Psikyo	European publisher
2004	America's 10 Most Wanted	Microsoft Windows, PlayStation 2	Black Ops Entertainment	European publisher
2004	Guncom 2	PlayStation 2	Ecole	European publisher
2004	Intellivision Lives!	PlayStation 2	Realtime Associates	European publisher
2004	Trigger Man	PlayStation 2	Point of View	European publisher
2004	Underworld: The Eternal War	PlayStation 2	Lucky Chicken Games	
2005	Gottlieb Pinball Classics	PlayStation 2	FarSight Studios	
2005	Gungrave: Overdose	PlayStation 2	Ikusabune	
2005	MX World Tour	PlayStation 2	Impulse Games	
2005	Strike Force Bowling	PlayStation 2	LAB Rats Games	
2005	World Championship Poker	PlayStation 2	Game Boy Advance, PlayStation 2	Coresoft
2006	Crazy Chicken X	PlayStation 2	Phenomedia Publishing	
2007	Impossible Mission	Nintendo DS, PlayStation 2, PlayStation Portable, Wii	Ziggurat Interactive	European publisher
2007	Tennis Masters	Nintendo DS	Mermaid Studios	
2008	Ferrari Challenge: Trofeo Pirelli	Nintendo DS, PlayStation 2, PlayStation 3, Wii	Eutechnyx	
2009	Supercar Challenge	PlayStation 3	Eutechnyx	
2010	Pinball Hall of Fame: The Williams Collection	Nintendo 3DS, PlayStation 2, PlayStation 3, PlayStation Portable, Wii, Xbox 360	FarSight Studios	European publisher
2010	Ferrari: The Race Experience	PlayStation 3, Wii	Eutechnyx	
2013	The Pinball Arcade	PlayStation 4	FarSight Studios	European publisher
2014	Pure Chess	PlayStation 4	VooFoo Studios	
2014	Pure Pool	PlayStation 4	VooFoo Studios	
2017	Stern Pinball Arcade	Nintendo Switch	FarSight Studios	European publisher
