= Super Fruit Fall =

2006 video game

- Wii version cover art
- Developer(s): Nissimo; SLAM Productions; Aqua Pacific (Wii)
- Publisher(s): NA: Codemasters (Wii); System 3
- Platform(s): Wii; PlayStation 2 PlayStation Portable; Nintendo DS
- Release: EU: 8 December 2006; AU: 11 January 2007; NA: 17 November 2009 (Wii)
- Genre(s): Puzzle
- Mode(s): Single-player

Super Fruit Fall is a video game designed by Cheshire-based game developer Nissimo and published by Cheshire-based System 3. Wii, PlayStation 2, and PSP versions of the game were developed by Leamington Spa-based game developer Aqua Pacific. A Nintendo DS version was also released.

== Gameplay ==
The object of the game is to get rid of all the fruit by spinning the puzzle frame in order to combine matching fruit into formations or 3 or more before the time runs out.

== Release ==
It was released for Wii in the UK on 8 December 2006, and in the US it was released on the Nintendo DS on 15 November 2007. It was released for PSP in Europe as Super Fruit Fall Deluxe Edition on 7 July 2007.

Super Fruit Fall was one of two Nintendo Wii launch titles developed by a UK developer.

== Reception ==
Reception

Review score
Publication	Score
IGN	5/10

The Official Nintendo Magazine, praised the game for the addictiveness throughout the game, but criticized the fact that flicking the Remote and Nunchuk to move the grid feels very pointless, and even stated that while it was addictive, it also didn't have enough value for money, as the game could be downloaded on PC for half the price.
