= Lather, rinse, repeat =

Idiom

Lather, rinse, repeat (sometimes wash, rinse, repeat) is an idiom roughly quoting the instructions found on many brands of shampoo. It is also used as a humorous way of pointing out that such instructions, if taken literally, would result in an endless loop of repeating the same steps, at least until one runs out of shampoo. It is also a sarcastic metaphor for following instructions or procedures slavishly without critical thought.

With modern shampoo, the first use is normally sufficient to clean hair. However, if the hair was very dirty then the first use will not result in a lot of lather. The second use then creates a lot more lather, which feels and looks good and gives the impression that the shampoo is somehow doing more useful activity, when in fact the first use was all that was really needed. The result is use, and purchase over time, of twice as much shampoo as is really needed.

It is known as the shampoo algorithm, and is a classic example of an algorithm in introductory computer science classes.

In Benjamin Cheever's novel The Plagiarist, a fictional advertising executive increases the sales of his client's shampoo by adding the word "repeat" to its instructions.

== See also ==
- Hair washing
