= Street Racing Syndicate =

2004 video game

- PAL region PS2 cover art featuring Sasha Singleton (right), the Nissan Skyline GT-R (left), and the Mazda RX-7 (middle)
- Developers: Eutechnyx; Mere Mortals (PC); Raylight Studios (GBA)
- Publishers: NA: Namco Hometek; EU: Codemasters (PS2, Xbox); EU: Nintendo (GCN); EU: HIP Interactive Europe (Windows)
- Platforms: GameCube; PlayStation 2; Xbox; Windows; Game Boy Advance
- Release: August 31, 2004: GameCube; NA: August 31, 2004; EU: March 4, 2005; AU: March 24, 2005 PlayStation 2 & Xbox; NA: August 31, 2004; EU: May 6, 2005; AU: May 20, 2005 Windows; NA: January 18, 2005; EU: March 24, 2005; AU: July 1, 2005 Game Boy Advance; NA: October 4, 2005; EU: December 16, 2005
- Genre: Racing
- Modes: Single-player, multiplayer

Street Racing Syndicate is an open world racing video game developed by Eutechnyx and published by Namco Hometek on August 31, 2004, for the PlayStation 2, GameCube, Xbox, and Windows. A separate version of the game was also released for the Game Boy Advance on October 4, 2005. During its release, it was meant to compete against Need for Speed: Underground 2, the sequel to the critically acclaimed first game released in 2003.

== Gameplay ==
The game features an underground import racing scene, on which the player's main objective is to live the life of a street racer, gaining respect and affection of various women in the city. This is featured in a way that the player must win a variety of respect challenges to attract girls and maintain a good victory streak in order to ensure that they remain with the player. Once in their car, the girls will present the next open race that the player enters. As the player continues to win races, dance videos will be unlocked for viewing. Also, another plot in the game's story mode is to earn a customized Nissan Skyline GT-R R34 after winning races.

The game has 50 licensed cars from a variety of manufacturers, including models from Nissan, Toyota, Mitsubishi, Lexus, Subaru, Mazda, and Volkswagen. SRS also features a car damage model that forces the player to drive carefully, heavy damages may impact car performance and heavy repairs may drain the player of money earned from their last race. The Game Boy Advance version does not have licensed car names, lacks police chases and career free roam, and customization is different from other platforms.

Street Racing Syndicate supports split-screen multiplayer and online multiplayer for up to 4 players.

== Development ==
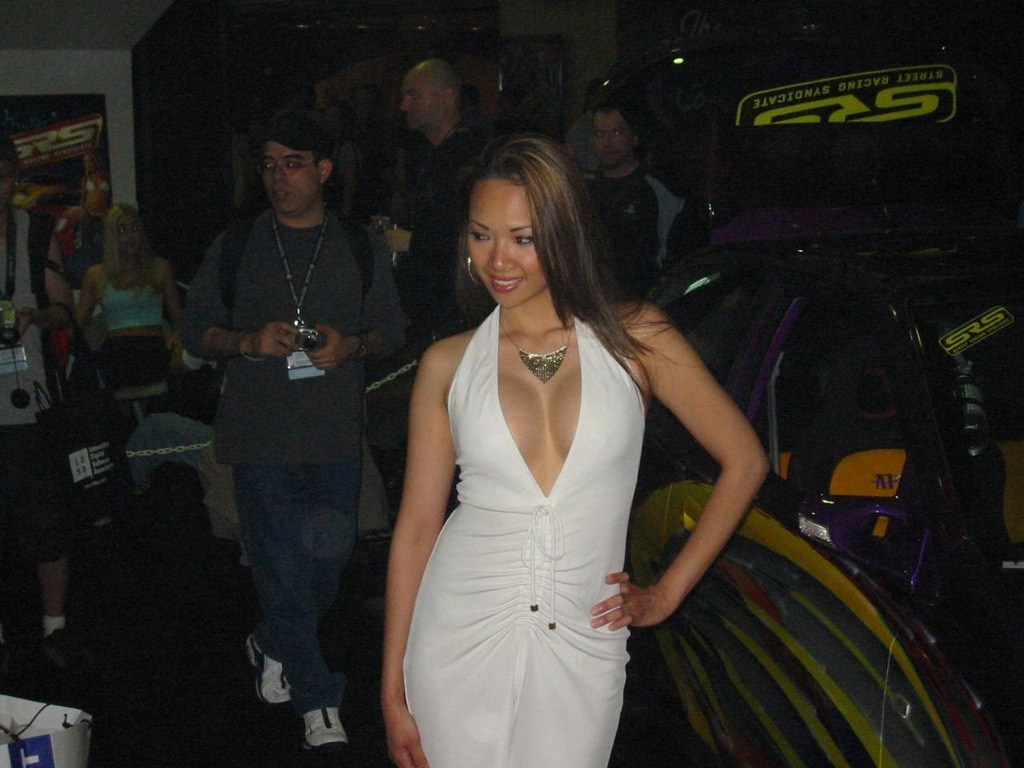
Rowena Galam-Crowe, one of the in-game girls promoting the game at E3 2003

The game was first announced as a joint-partnership between Eutechnyx and The 3DO Company at the end of May 2002 for a release the following summer. Following 3DO's bankruptcy in 2003, they auctioned off their titles with Namco Hometek picking up the publishing rights to the title for $1.5 million, compared to the $1.3 million that Ubisoft paid for the Heroes of Might and Magic franchise.

In March 2005, Codemasters announced that they would co-publish and distribute the PlayStation 2 and Xbox versions of the game in Europe with Namco, while Nintendo of Europe would handle the GameCube version's distribution.

== Reception ==
=== Game Boy Advance ===
Reception

Aggregate score
Aggregator	Score
GameRankings	49%

Review scores
Publication	Score
IGN	5.5/10
Nintendo Power	5.5/10
Nintendo X2	5.4/10

=== GameCube ===
Reception

Aggregate scores
Aggregator	Score
GameRankings	68%
Metacritic	64/100

Review scores
Publication	Score
Electronic Gaming Monthly	6.33/10
Game Informer	6.75/10
GameSpot	6.2/10
IGN	7.1/10
Nintendo Power	3.8/5

=== PC ===
Reception

Aggregate score
Aggregator	Score
GameRankings	61%

Review score
Publication	Score
PC Gamer (US)	59%

=== PlayStation 2 ===
Reception

Aggregate scores
Aggregator	Score
GameRankings	66%
Metacritic	62/100

Review scores
Publication	Score
Electronic Gaming Monthly	6.33/10
Eurogamer	5/10
Game Informer	6.75/10
GamePro	3.5/5
GameRevolution	C−
GameSpot	6.2/10
GameSpy	2/5
GameZone	6.9/10
IGN	7.1/10
Official U.S. PlayStation Magazine	3/5

=== Xbox ===
Reception

Aggregate scores
Aggregator	Score
GameRankings	68%
Metacritic	66/100

Review scores
Publication	Score
Electronic Gaming Monthly	6.33/10
Game Informer	6.75/10
GamePro	3.5/5
GameRevolution	C−
GameSpot	6.2/10
GameSpy	2/5
IGN	7.1/10
Official Xbox Magazine (US)	7.7/10

The GameCube, PlayStation 2 and Xbox versions received "mixed or average reviews" according to video game review aggregator Metacritic.
