= Mob Rule =

1999 video game

- Developer: Studio 3
- Publishers: EU: Studio 3; NA: Simon & Schuster Interactive
- Platforms: Windows; Mac OS X
- Release: EU: 1999; NA: 7 September 1999; Windows, Mac OS X: WW: 2010 and 2013
- Genre: Real-time strategy
- Modes: Single-player, Multiplayer

Mob Rule (also known as Constructor: Street Wars and Street Wars: Constructor Underworld in Europe) is a real-time strategy video game developed and published by Studio 3 in 1999 for Microsoft Windows. It is the successor to the 1997 video game Constructor. The goal of the game is to construct buildings and fight enemy teams in a Mafia-themed background. It was re-released on GOG.com in 2010 for Windows and in 2013 for MacOS.

== Critical reception ==
Reception

Aggregate score
Aggregator	Score
GameRankings	60%

Review scores
Publication	Score
Computer Games Strategy Plus	2.5/5
Computer Gaming World	2/5
GamePro	2/5
GameRevolution	C+
GameSpot	6/10
GameStar	80%
IGN	5.2/10
Jeuxvideo.com	16/20
PC Accelerator	5/10
PC Gamer (US)	82%
PC Games (DE)	77%

The game received mixed reviews according to the review aggregation website GameRankings.
