= Vendetta (1989 video game) =

1989 beat 'em up computer game by System 3

- Cover art
- Publisher: System 3
- Platforms: Amstrad CPC; Commodore 64; ZX Spectrum
- Release: 1989
- Genre: Beat 'em up
- Mode: Single-player

Vendetta is a 1989 beat 'em up video game released by System 3 for the Amstrad CPC, Commodore 64, and ZX Spectrum.

== Plot ==
The protagonist is an ex-military veteran and soldier of the higher calibre. His brother is a military scientist involved in the development of top-secret nuclear weapons technology. A terrorist group kidnap the protagonist's brother and his daughter, and are intent on obtaining the formula to generate deadly weapons.

The protagonist sets out the rescue his brother and niece, and eliminate the terrorist group.

== Gameplay ==
Isometric level (Commodore 64)

The game is presented in an isometric view. The player, controlling the ex-military veteran, must fight his way through various levels populated by terrorists, collecting necessary items in the process.

There are four isometric levels (Docklands, Army Base, Airport and Central Park). The environments are divided into individual screens, which the player navigates while fighting enemy soldiers and searching for useful objects. Exploration is an important part of the gameplay, as weapons, ammunition, protective equipment, keys and other items can be concealed in the environment. Certain doors must be forced open, while other obstacles require the player to find and use appropriate objects. The player must also collect evidence and information needed to progress through the game.

Driving level (Commodore 64)

The player is initially armed with a knife, but can collect grenades, an AK-47 and an Uzi (as well as ammunition) to assist with defeating the terrorists.

The exploration stages are interspersed with a driving sequence minigame in which the player drives a Ferrari F40 sports car along a highway. These sections introduce a different style of gameplay, requiring the player to steer around traffic while progressing towards the next destination. Helicopters attack the vehicle, which can be equipped with machine guns and surface-to-air missiles. A turbo boost is also available. Police roadblocks provide an additional obstacle: officers may demand evidence collected during the preceding exploration stage before allowing the player to continue.

== Development ==
Vendetta was based on the same rendering method and display used by The Last Ninja, but used a rewritten engine. This game engine was then used for the game Last Ninja 3.

== Reception ==
Vendetta received a Sizzler award (93%) from Zzap!64, a Crash Smash award from Crash magazine, and a Hit award from C+VG magazine.
