= Ferrari Challenge: Trofeo Pirelli =

2008 racing video game

Ferrari Challenge Trofeo Pirelli
- PlayStation 3 version's cover art featuring a Ferrari F430 Challenge
- Developers: Eutechnyx; Firebrand Games (DS)
- Publisher: System 3 (Note: Distributed in North America by Activision and in Europe by Koch Media)
- Designers: Mark Cale, Dave Thompson, Gareth Wright
- Platforms: PlayStation 3, PlayStation 2, Wii, Nintendo DS
- Release: EU: July 4, 2008 (PS3, DS); NA: August 26, 2008; AU: August 28, 2008; EU: September 12, 2008 (PS2, Wii)
- Genre: Racing
- Modes: Single-player, multiplayer (exc. Wii)

Ferrari Challenge Trofeo Pirelli is a racing game developed by Eutechnyx and published by System 3, based on the Ferrari Challenge, a single-marque motorsport championship. The game features 14 playable tracks and Ferrari's own Fiorano test track (for training using a solitary F430 Challenge), a vinyl editor and online play for all versions except the PS2. The Nintendo DS version, developed by Firebrand Games, features wireless multiplayer and the Wii version utilizes Wii Remote steering and support for the Wii Wheel. The game primarily features the driving and racing of the Ferrari F430 Challenge, along with a series of Ferrari road and racing cars that can be unlocked.

== Gameplay ==
Driving is less arcade style and more of a simulation. It has a driving experience that is somewhere between Gran Turismo and the Need for Speed games or Race Driver: Grid. All console versions support multiple control schemes, allowing the use of wireless Logitech racing wheels, while the Wii version can be played with the Wii Remote held sideways or the Wii Remote and Nunchuk, with steering handled by either the Wii Wheel or the D-pad for the former.

The driving tutorial helps the player to get used to the driving experience. The player drives two laps around the Fiorano Circuit (Ferrari's real test track) with the Ferrari F430 Challenge car with professional race driver Tiff Needell talking and walking through the steps of how to get the most speed out of the F430. There are four main areas the tutorial focuses on: throttle control, use of brakes, apex accuracy, and race line accuracy. There is also a card-playing minigame that is accessible between races.

The cars in the game range from road cars to GT production vehicles. The main car of the game is the F430 Challenge, which does not have to be unlocked and appears at the beginning. The other cars are unlocked by winning trophies with different cars or progressing through the Challenge mode of the game. Despite System 3's claims of over 50 Ferraris on disc, no one has ever found more than 22. The in-game tips actually mention the presence of only 22 cars. There are more included in the DLCs, but the idea of 50 cars is supported by the ability to have up to 64 cars in the Showroom feature of the game.

== Development and release ==
Trofeo Pirelli was released in Europe by distributor Koch Media on for PlayStation 3 and Nintendo DS on July 4, 2008, and for PlayStation 2 and Wii on September 12, 2008. Distributed by Activision, the game shipped in North America simultaneously for PlayStation 2, PlayStation 3, Nintendo DS, and Wii on August 26, 2008, and in Australia on August 28, 2008. A version for PlayStation Portable was initially developed alongside the other versions before being canceled one month prior to release. In 2013, the PlayStation 3 version was made available to download in Korea.

=== Downloadable content ===
The PlayStation 3 version of the game features two additional downloadable content packs that can be acquired once the game is updated to its latest version. The packs feature unlockable cars and tracks that can also be obtained individually.

- "Pack 1 - Ferrari Pack" contains one new track (Nürburgring GP track) and five new Ferrari cars: Enzo Ferrari, 430 Scuderia, F330 P4, 599 GTB Fiorano and 612 Scaglietti Sessanta. This pack was released in 2009.
- "Pack 2" contains one new track (Riviera street circuit) and five new Ferrari cars: 288 GTO, 365 GTS, F430 Spider, F512M 1994 and F40 GT. This pack was released in 2010.

=== Deluxe edition ===
System 3 also released a cheaper version of Trofeo Pirelli the following year in Europe and Australia, titling it Ferrari Challenge: Deluxe and adding new cover art to market it as a budget edition. It is available on the same platforms as the original release.

== Reception ==
Reception

Aggregate score
Aggregator	Score			
Aggregator	DS	PS2	PS3	Wii
Metacritic	65/100	62/100	71/100	65/100

Review scores
Publication	Score			
Publication	DS	PS2	PS3	Wii
Edge	N/A	N/A	7/10	N/A
Eurogamer	N/A	N/A	7/10	5/10
Game Informer	N/A	N/A	7.75/10	N/A
GameRevolution	N/A	N/A	C−	N/A
GameSpot	N/A	N/A	6.5/10	N/A
GameZone	N/A	N/A	5.5/10	N/A
IGN	6.2/10	6.6/10	(UK) 8.3/10 (US) 6.8/10	6.8/10
Nintendo Power	6/10	N/A	N/A	7.5/10
PlayStation: The Official Magazine	N/A	N/A	2.5/5	N/A
VideoGamer.com	N/A	N/A	7/10	N/A

The game received "mixed or average" reviews on all platforms according to video game review aggregator website Metacritic.

The Brazilian site Baixaki Jogos rated the PlayStation 3 version of Ferrari Challenge Trofeo Pirelli 7.4 out of 10, while the Nintendo Wii version received 6.5 out of 10.

=== Sales ===
Within the first three weeks of its release in the United Kingdom, sales of the title suffered from limited distribution, which caused it to fail in entering the weekly Top 40 best-selling games in the UK chart.

== Expanded sequel ==
Ferrari: The Race Experience is a racing simulator and an expanded sequel to Ferrari Challenge Trofeo Pirelli. It was also developed by Eutechnyx and published by System 3. Ferrari The Race Experience was released for the PlayStation Network in 2010, and on PlayStation 3 disc in 2011. The retail release for the Nintendo Wii was released in 2011, exclusively in Europe.

The majority of the 17 circuits and 32 cars have been recycled from Ferrari Challenge Trofeo Pirelli (including both DLC packs). Vehicle roster is now extended to include Ferrari models 599XX and 458 Italia. There is a new career mode, with three racing classes (covering Classic cars, GT Road cars and GT Race cars). The PS3 version has also 1-16 player LAN and online multiplayer.
