= Eutechnyx =

Former British video game developer

Eutechnyx Limited
- Type: Private
- Industry: Video games
- Founded: 30 September 1987; 39 years ago
- Defunct: 20 May 2025; 17 months ago
- Fate: Dissolved
- Headquarters: Newcastle upon Tyne, England
- Key people: Darren Jobling (CEO)

Eutechnyx Limited (formerly Zeppelin Games Limited, until 1994, and Merit Studios (Europe) Limited, until 1997) was a British video game developer based in Newcastle upon Tyne, England. Since 1997, the company focused on racing games. They were known for its universally panned video game Ride to Hell: Retribution (2013), for work with the NASCAR The Game franchise, and as a developer on various other racing titles and games.

After not releasing any games in 10 years (NASCAR '15 being its last title), the company was finally shut down on May 20, 2025, with Eutechnyx Limited being dissolved and Eutechnyx Holdings Limited also undergoing insolvency.

== History ==
=== Zeppelin Games (1987–1994) ===
The company founder, Brian Jobling, started creating games for the Atari 8-bit computers, ZX Spectrum, Amstrad CPC and Commodore 64 at home in the early 1980s as a 14-year-old. With the money that he made, he started the company, Zeppelin Games, in November 1987 when he was 17. Zeppelin Games produced a large number of games for various home computer systems including Atari 8-bit, Commodore 64, ZX Spectrum, Atari ST and Amiga and by the early 90s were also making games for IBM PC compatibles and consoles such as the Mega Drive/Genesis and SNES. Popular games included Jocky Wilson's Darts Challenge, International Tennis, Universal Warrior and Sink or Swim. They also worked with publisher Codemasters to produce the first two Micro Machines games and Pete Sampras Tennis.

The company, being primarily a budget publisher, operated several labels for different price ranges; among them were Cognito and Impulze for full-price releases, Zeppelin Premier and Zeppelin Platinum.

=== Merit Studios Europe (1994–1996) ===
The company was acquired by American company Merit Studios, Inc. in 1994 and became known as Merit Studios Europe. As well as developing its own games, the company was also responsible for the marketing and distribution of Merit's US games in Europe.

=== Eutechnyx (1996–2025) ===
The company became Eutechnyx in 1996. After gaining registered developer and publisher status for the Sony PlayStation, the directors bought back the company from Merit with help from French publishers Infogrames. This started a 3-year agreement with Eutechnyx developing exclusively for Infogrames on the PlayStation and PC platforms. The end of this agreement meant that as of 2000, the company became a fully independent developer and began to release games across many formats for publishing companies such as Electronic Arts and Namco. Since 1996, the company has specialised in driving and racing games of many types, including licensed titles such as James Bond 007, Max Power, Cartoon Network and The Fast and the Furious.

As of 2009, Eutechnyx had studios in Gateshead, England; Hong Kong; Chengdu; and the United States. It employed almost 200 people.

After the failure of Ride to Hell: Retribution, the London studio was closed in June 2013. In June 2013, several employees were loaned to Ubisoft Reflections and in February 2014, a restructuring was announced, with the loss of 12 jobs, taking the headcount to 130.

In 2012, sister company ZeroLight was formed at the Gateshead offices, to apply the realtime rendering technology developed for racing games to showroom and online configurators for car manufacturers.

In October 2013, Darren Jobling replaced his brother Brian as CEO, to take on a more active role in development, with Brian becoming Executive Chairman.

In July 2014, again after the failure of Warhammer 40k: Storm of Vengeance, following another re-structuring an additional 19 members of staff were lost.

In January 2015, its NASCAR license were given to Dusenberry Martin Racing, while Eutechnyx continued to develop its final NASCAR title, NASCAR '15, for DMR; subsequent NASCAR titles by it (since renamed 704Games and purchased by Motorsport Network) were developed by Monster Games (until the 2019 title NASCAR Heat 4) instead. In July 2015, following commercially disappointing results from ambitious multiplayer online racing game ACR, a further 8 redundancies were made, with some of the 22 people announced as being added to sister firm ZeroLight, being relocated from Eutechnyx.

In September 2016, Zerolight moved across the river from Eutechnyx' Gateshead office to LiveWorks, on the Quayside at Newcastle upon Tyne.

== Games developed ==
=== as Zeppelin Games ===
- 1988 Zybex (C64, ZX, Atari 8-bit)
- 1988 Draconus (C64, ZX, Atari 8-bit)
- 1988 Las Vegas Casino (C64, ZX, CPC, Atari 8-bit)
- 1988 Speed Ace (Atari 8-bit)
- 1989 Jocky Wilson's Darts Challenge (C64, ZX, CPC, Atari 8-bit, Amiga)
- 1989 Kenny Dalglish Soccer Manager (C64, ZX, CPC, Atari 8-bit, Amiga, Atari ST)
- 1989 The Living Daylights (Atari 8-bit - re-release from Domark)
- 1989 Mirax Force (Atari 8-bit - re-release from Tynesoft)
- 1989 Mountain Bike Racer (C64, ZX, Atari 8-bit, MSX)
- 1989 Ninja Commando (C64, ZX, CPC, Atari 8-bit)
- 1989 Phantom (Atari 8-bit - re-release from Tynesoft/Micro Value)
- 1989 Sidewinder (Atari 8-bit - re-release from Futureware)
- 1989 Spaghetti Western Simulator (C64, MSX, ZX, CPC)
- 1990 Fantastic Soccer (C64, Atari 8-bit)
- 1990 Fantastic American Football (ZX)
- 1990 Edd The Duck! (C64, ZX, CPC, Amig], Atari ST)
- 1990 World Soccer (C64, ZX, CPC, Atari 8-bit, Amiga)
- 1990 Arcade Fruit Machine (C64, ZX, CPC, Atari 8-bit, Amiga, Atari ST, PC)
- 1990 Blinky's Scary School (C64, ZX, Atari 8-bit, Amiga, Atari ST)
- 1990 Cavernia (Atari 8-bit)
- 1990 Santa's Xmas Caper (C64, ZX, CPC, Amiga)
- 1991 Jocky Wilson's Compendium of Darts (C64, ZX, Atari 8-bit, Amiga, Atari ST)
- 1991 Stack Up (ZX, Atari 8-bit, Amiga, Atari ST, PC)
- 1991 Tai-Chi Tortoise (C64, ZX)
- 1991 Titanic Blinky (C64, ZX, CPC, Amiga, Atari ST)
- 1991 Sharkey's Moll (ZX, CPC, Amiga, Atari ST)
- 1991 Mission Shark (Atari 8-bit - import from Polish developer LK Avalon Misja)
- 1991 Fred (Atari 8-bit - import from LK Avalon)
- 1991 F1 Tornado (C64, ZX, CPC, Amiga, Atari ST)
- 1992 Arnie (C64, Amiga)
- 1992 Edd The Duck 2: Back with a Quack (Amiga)
- 1992 American Tag-Team Wrestling (ZX, CPC, Amiga)
- 1992 International 5-A-Side (C64, ZX)
- 1992 International Truck Racing (C64, Amiga, Atari ST)
- 1992 International Tennis (C64, ZX, Amiga, MS-DOS)
- 1992 International Athletics (MS-DOS)
- 1992 Match Of The Day (C64, ZX, Amiga, Atari ST)
- 1992 Graeme Souness Soccer Manager (C64, ZX, Amiga, Atari ST, MS-DOS)
- 1992 Carnage (C64, Amiga, Atari ST, MS-DOS)
- 1993 Fist Fighter (C64, Amiga)
- 1993 Arnie 2 (C64, Amiga, MS-DOS)
- 1993 World Rugby (C64, ZX)
- 1993 Universal Warrior (Amiga)
- 1993 Sink or Swim a.k.a. S.S. Lucifer: Man Overboard (Amiga, MS-DOS, SNES, Mega Drive)
- 1994 International Soccer (Amiga, MS-DOS)
- 1994 Pete Sampras Tennis (Mega Drive)

=== as Merit Studios Europe ===
- 1994 The Psychotron
- 1994 The Machines (PC) A revised port of Universal Warrior
- 1994 Micro Machines (SNES, GB)
- 1995 Frankenstein: Life or Death (PC) Developed by Junkyard
- 1995 Micro Machines 2: Turbo Tournament (SNES)
- 1996 CyberJudas (DOS) Published by Merit Studios, developed by D.C. True. Successor to Shadow President.
- 1996 Bud Tucker in Double Trouble (PC)

=== as Eutechnyx ===
- 1997 Total Drivin (PS1)
- 1998 Motor Mash (PS1, PC)
- 1998 Max Power Racing a.k.a. C3 Racing - Car Constructors Championship (PS1)
- 1999 Le Mans 24 Hours (PS1, PC)
- 2000 007 Racing (PS1)
- 2000 TNN Hardcore TR (PS1) US only release.
- 2001 F1 World Grand Prix 2000 (PS1, PC)
- 2002 Big Mutha Truckers (PS2, Xbox, GameCube, PC)
- 2004 Street Racing Syndicate (PS2, Xbox, GameCube, PC)
- 2005 Ford Mustang: The Legend Lives (PS2, Xbox)
- 2005 Ford vs. Chevy (PS2, Xbox)
- 2005 Big Mutha Truckers 2: Truck Me Harder (PS2, Xbox, PC)
- 2006 Cartoon Network Racing (PS2)
- 2006 Hummer Badlands (PS2, Xbox)
- 2006 The Fast and the Furious (PS2, PSP)
- 2006 Pimp My Ride (PS2, Xbox 360)
- 2007 Hot Wheels: Beat That! (PS2, PC, Xbox 360, Wii)
- 2008 Ferrari Challenge: Trofeo Pirelli (PS2, PS3, Wii, DS, PSP)
- 2009 Supercar Challenge (PS3, PSN)
- 2010 Ferrari: The Race Experience (PSN, Wii)
- 2011 NASCAR The Game: 2011 (PS3, Xbox 360, Wii)
- 2012 Auto Club Revolution (PC)
- 2012 NASCAR The Game: Inside Line (PS3, Xbox 360, Wii)
- 2013 Ride to Hell: Retribution (PS3, Xbox 360, PC)
- 2013 NASCAR: The Game 2013 (PC)
- 2014 NASCAR '14 (PS3, Xbox 360, PC)
- 2014 Warhammer 40,000: Storm of Vengeance (PC, iOS, Android)
- 2015 NASCAR '15 (PS3, Xbox 360, PC)
