= List of Game Boy Color games =

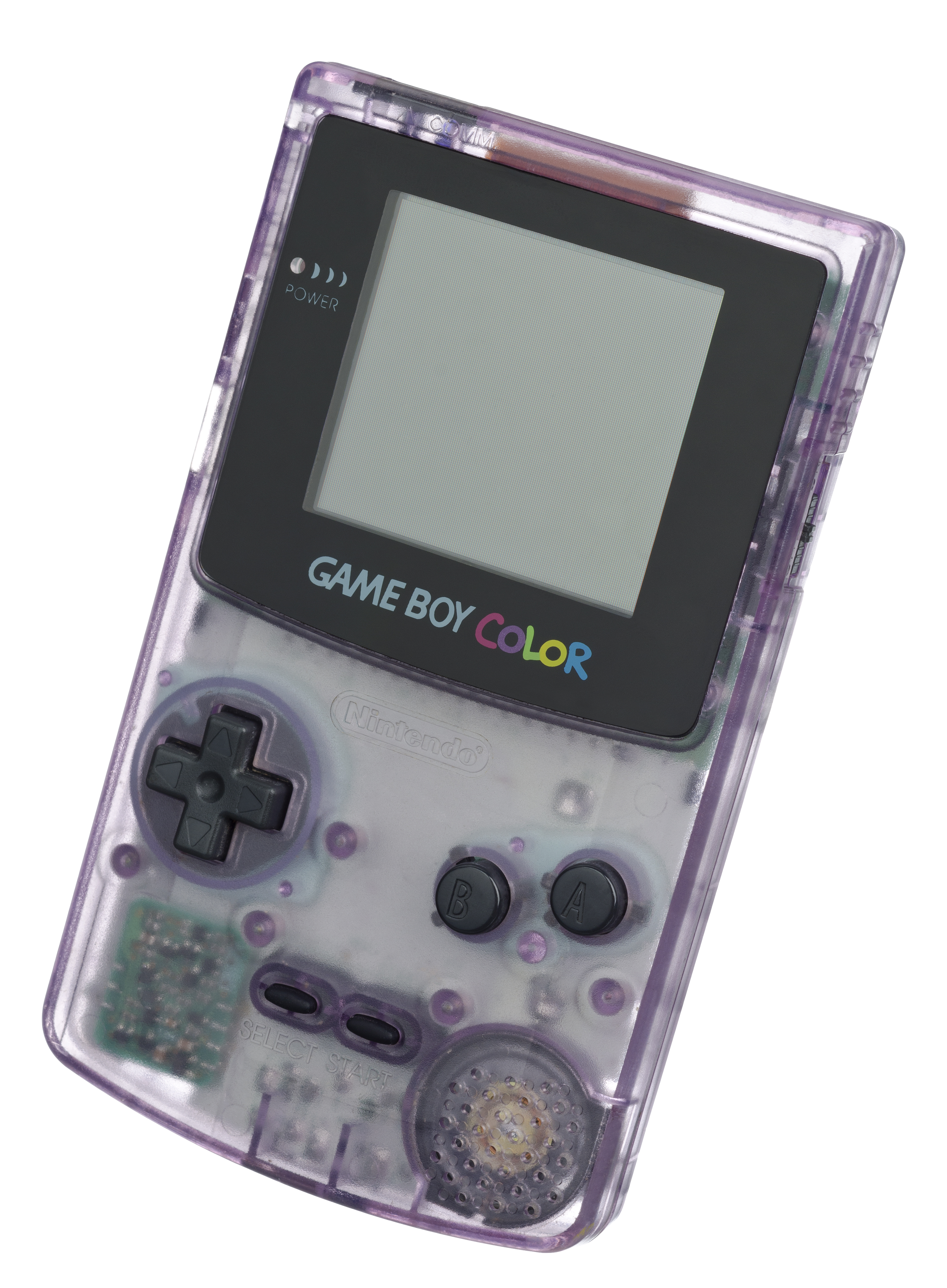
Atomic Purple variant of the Game Boy Color

This list of Game Boy Color games includes 915 (Note: This number is always up to date by this script.) licensed releases from the Game Boy Color's launch in 1998 to the final release in 2003. The last official release for the system was Doraemon no Study Boy: Kanji Yomikaki Master, which was released in Japan on July 18, 2003. However, multiple unlicensed games (many of which are developed and distributed by fans) have been released since then. Additionally, there were several games which were developed and officially licensed, but were cancelled before release.

Games were released under two classes of cartridges. "Dual Mode" cartridges are compatible with Game Boy systems that predate the Game Boy Color, and feature both Game Boy and Game Boy Color versions of the game on the cartridges. Their boxes are labeled "Compatible with Game Boy" and the cartridges are typically molded in black to distinguish them from original Game Boy cartridges. Many of them also support features of the Super Game Boy peripheral for the Super Nintendo Entertainment System. Cartridges compatible only with the Game Boy Color, Game Boy Advance, Game Boy Advance SP, and the Game Boy Player peripheral for the GameCube typically feature the disclaimers "Only for Game Boy Color" and "Not compatible with other Game Boy systems!" on their box art and sometimes on the cartridge, with the cartridge typically made of clear plastic.

This list is organized alphabetically by the games' localized English titles, or by rōmaji transliterations when exclusive to Japan. The releases are sorted into 3 main regions (Japan, North America, and European Union/PAL region), specifying if certain European games had country-specific distribution. There is also one game exclusive to the country of South Korea.

== Licensed games (released) ==
=== Regions ===
Regions released	NA+EU+JP	NA+EU	NA+JP	EU+JP	Unique	Total	Region description
NA=North America	77	269	26		72	444	North America and other NTSC territories.
EU=Europe and other PAL territories	77	269		12	103	461	PAL/SECAM territories: much of Europe and Australia.
J=Japan	77		26	12	357	472	Japan, Hong Kong and other NTSC-J territories.
Combined	77	271	26	12	530	915 (Note: The total includes Bomberman Selection, a Korea-only release published in 2003.)	

=== List of games ===
Title	Dual Mode	Cartridge feature	Developer	Publisher	First released	JP	NA	EU/PAL
102 Dalmatians: Puppies to the Rescue	No	—N/a	Digital Eclipse	Activision	December 6, 2000 (NA); December 8, 2000 (EU)	No	Yes	Yes
3D Pocket Pool	No	—N/a	Aardvark Software	Virgin Interactive	March 30, 2001 (EU)	No	No	Yes
3-D Ultra Pinball: Thrillride	No	Rumble Pak	Left Field Productions	Sierra On-Line	December 1, 2000 (NA)	No	Yes	No
10 Pin Bowling	No	Rumble Pak	Morning Star Multimedia	Majesco	August 1, 1999 (NA, EU)	No	Yes	Yes
1942	No	—N/a	Digital Eclipse	Capcom	May 1, 2000 (NA); January 1, 2001 (EU)	No	Yes	Yes
720°	Yes	—N/a	Digital Eclipse	Midway	March 1, 2000 (NA, EU)	No	Yes	Yes
Action Man: Search for Base X	No	—N/a	Natsume Co., Ltd.	THQ	February 6, 2001 (NA); March 9, 2001 (EU)	No	Yes	Yes
The Adventures of the Smurfs	No	—N/a	Infogrames	Infogrames	October 11, 2001 (EU)	No	No	Yes
AirForce Delta •Deadly Skies^{EU}	No	—N/a	Climax	Konami	November 22, 2000 (JP); November 21, 2000 (NA); December 2000 (EU)	Yes	Yes	Yes
Aladdin	No	—N/a	Crawfish Interactive	Ubi Soft	November 7, 2000 (NA); November 20, 2000 (EU)	No	Yes	Yes
Alfred's Adventure	No	—N/a	Möbius Entertainment	Sales Curve Interactive	September 1, 2000 (EU)	No	No	Yes
Alice in Wonderland	No	—N/a	Digital Eclipse	Nintendo	October 4, 2000 (NA); April 20, 2001 (EU)	No	Yes	Yes
Aliens: Thanatos Encounter	No	—N/a	Crawfish Interactive	THQ	March 30, 2001 (NA, EU)	No	Yes	Yes
All-Star Baseball 2000	No	—N/a	Realtime Associates	Acclaim Sports	May 1, 2000 (NA, EU)	No	Yes	Yes
All-Star Baseball 2001	No	—N/a	KnowWonder	Acclaim Sports	June 1, 2000 (NA)	No	Yes	No
All Star Tennis 2000	Yes	—N/a	Smart Dog	Ubi Soft	June 25, 1999 (EU)	No	No	Yes
Alone in the Dark: The New Nightmare	No	—N/a	Pocket Studios	Infogrames	June 27, 2001 (NA); May 18, 2001 (EU)	No	Yes	Yes
Animal Breeder 3	Yes	—N/a	J-Wing	J-Wing	June 24, 1999 (JP)	Yes	No	No
Animal Breeder 4	No	—N/a	J-Wing	J-Wing	January 1, 2001 (JP)	Yes	No	No
Animastar GB	No	—N/a	Aki Corp.	Media Factory	March 30, 2001 (JP)	Yes	No	No
Animorphs	No	—N/a	Runny-Fun	Ubi Soft	November 7, 2000 (NA); December 15, 2000 (EU)	No	Yes	Yes
Antz	Yes	—N/a	CLCE & Planet	Infogrames	September 24, 1999 (NA, EU)	No	Yes	Yes
Antz Racing	No	—N/a	RFX Interactive	Acclaim Entertainment^{NA} Electronic Arts^{EU}	June 1, 2001 (NA); March 30, 2001 (EU)	No	Yes	Yes
Antz World Sportz	No	—N/a	M4 Limited	Light and Shadow Production	November 30, 2001 (EU)	No	No	Yes
AquaLife	Yes	—N/a	Tamsoft	Tamsoft	October 22, 1999 (JP)	Yes	No	No
Arle no Bouken: Mahou no Jewel	Yes	—N/a	Compile	Compile	March 31, 2000 (JP)	Yes	No	No
Armada F/X Racers	No	—N/a	Metro3D	Metro3D	August 25, 2000 (NA)	No	Yes	No
Armorines: Project S.W.A.R.M.	No	—N/a	Neon Software	Acclaim Entertainment	December 1, 1999 (NA); December 3, 2000 (EU)	No	Yes	Yes
Army Men	No	—N/a	Digital Eclipse	The 3DO Company	February 22, 2000 (NA, EU)	No	Yes	Yes
Army Men 2	No	—N/a	Digital Eclipse	The 3DO Company	October 31, 2000 (NA); November 24, 2000 (EU)	No	Yes	Yes
Army Men: Air Combat	No	—N/a	Fluid Studios	The 3DO Company	November 20, 2000 (NA); November 24, 2000 (EU)	No	Yes	Yes
Army Men: Sarge's Heroes 2	No	—N/a	Game Brains	The 3DO Company	November 21, 2000 (NA); November 24, 2000 (EU)	No	Yes	Yes
Arthur's Absolutely Fun Day!	No	—N/a	Magnin & Associates	The Learning Company; Mattel Interactive	September 7, 2000 (NA, EU)	No	Yes	Yes
Astérix: Search for Dogmatix •Astérix: Auf Der Suche Nach Idefix^{DE}	No	—N/a	Rebellion	Infogrames	May 31, 2000 (EU)	No	No	Yes
Astérix & Obelix	No	—N/a	Bit Managers	Infogrames	January 1, 1999 (EU)	No	No	Yes
Astérix & Obélix vs. Caesar	Yes	—N/a	Cryo Interactive	Cryo Interactive	August 1, 2000 (EU)	No	No	Yes
Asteroids	Yes	—N/a	Syrox Developments	Activision	September 1, 1999 (NA, EU)	No	Yes	Yes
Atlantis: The Lost Empire	No	—N/a	Eurocom	THQ	June 14, 2001 (NA, EU)	No	Yes	Yes
Austin Powers: Oh, Behave!	No	—N/a	Tarantula Studios	Rockstar Games	September 18, 2000 (NA); November 3, 2000 (EU)	No	Yes	Yes
Austin Powers: Welcome to My Underground Lair!	No	—N/a	Tarantula Studios	Rockstar Games	September 18, 2000 (NA); November 3, 2000 (EU)	No	Yes	Yes
Azarashi Sentai Inazuma: Doki Doki Daisakusen!?	No	—N/a	Omega Products	Omega Products	March 29, 2002 (JP)	Yes	No	No
Azure Dreams •Other Life: Azure Dreams^{JP}	Yes	—N/a	Konami	Konami	August 5, 1999 (JP); February 2000 (NA); 2000 (EU)	Yes	Yes	Yes
B-Daman Bakugaiden: Victory e no Michi	Yes	—N/a	C.P. Brain	Media Factory	January 29, 1999 (JP)	Yes	No	No
B-Daman Bakugaiden V: Final Mega Tune	No	—N/a	Media Factory	Media Factory	February 4, 2000 (JP)	Yes	No	No
Babe and Friends	Yes	—N/a	Aqua Pacific	Crave Entertainment	November 1, 1999 (NA, EU)	No	Yes	Yes
Baby Felix: Halloween	No	—N/a	Bit Managers	Light and Shadow Production	December 19, 2001 (EU)	No	No	Yes
Backgammon	Yes	—N/a	Altron	JVC Music Europe^{EU} Altron^{JP}	August 27, 1999 (JP); December 1, 2000 (EU)	Yes	No	Yes
Bad Batsumaru: Robo Battle	No	—N/a	TOSE	Imagineer	August 10, 2001 (JP)	Yes	No	No
Bakukyuu Renpatsu!! Super B-Daman: Gekitan! Rising Valkyrie!	Yes	—N/a	Alpha Unit	Takara	March 24, 2000 (JP)	Yes	No	No
Bakusou Dekotora Densetsu GB Special: Otoko Dokyou no Tenka Touitsu	No	—N/a	KID	KID	July 21, 2000 (JP)	Yes	No	No
Bakuten Shoot Beyblade	No	—N/a	Broccoli	Hudson Soft	July 27, 2001 (JP)	Yes	No	No
Ballistic •Puzz Loop^{JP}	Yes	—N/a	Mitchell Corporation	Infogrames ^{NA} Capcom^{JP}	March 17, 2000 (JP); November 2000 (NA)	Yes	Yes	No
Balloon Fight GB	Yes	—N/a	Pax Softonica	Nintendo	July 31, 2000 (JP)	Yes	No	No
Barbie: Fashion Pack Games	Yes	—N/a	Hyperspace Cowgirls	Mattel Interactive	September 1, 2000 (NA, EU)	No	Yes	Yes
Barbie: Magic Genie Adventure	No	—N/a	Vicarious Visions	Mattel Interactive	November 11, 2000 (NA)	No	Yes	No
Barbie: Ocean Discovery	Yes	—N/a	Realtime Associates	Mattel Interactive	May 1, 1999 (NA, EU)	No	Yes	Yes
Barbie: Pet Rescue •Barbie: Pet Patrol^{EU}	No	—N/a	HotGen	Vivendi Universal Interactive Publishing	August 15, 2001 (NA); December 14, 2001 (EU)	No	Yes	Yes
Barcode Taisen Bardigun	Yes	—N/a	Graphic Research	Tamsoft	December 11, 1999 (JP)	Yes	No	No
Bass Masters Classic	Yes	—N/a	Natsume Co., Ltd.	THQ	November 4, 1999 (NA); December 31, 1999 (EU)	No	Yes	Yes
Batman: Chaos in Gotham	No	—N/a	Digital Eclipse	Ubi Soft	April 16, 2001 (NA); 2001 (EU)	No	Yes	Yes
Batman Beyond: Return of the Joker •Batman of the Future: Return of the Joker^{EU}	No	—N/a	Kemco	Ubi Soft	November 20, 2000 (NA); December 8, 2000 (EU)	No	Yes	Yes
Battleship	Yes	—N/a	Pack-In-Video	Majesco	January 1, 1999 (NA, EU)	No	Yes	Yes
BattleTanx	No	—N/a	Lucky Chicken Games	3DO	March 1, 2000 (NA, EU)	No	Yes	Yes
Beatmania GB	Yes	—N/a	Konami	Konami	March 11, 1999 (JP)	Yes	No	No
Beatmania GB2: GotchaMix	Yes	—N/a	Konami	Konami	November 25, 1999 (JP)	Yes	No	No
Beatmania GB: GotchaMix 2	No	—N/a	Konami	Konami	September 28, 2000 (JP)	Yes	No	No
Beauty and the Beast: A Board Game Adventure	Yes	—N/a	Left Field Productions	Nintendo	October 25, 1999 (NA); December 1999 (EU)	No	Yes	Yes
Benjamin Blümchen: Ein Verrückter Tag im Zoo	No	—N/a	BVM Produktion	Kiddinx	November 6, 2001 (EU)	No	No	Yes
Beyblade: Fighting Tournament	No	—N/a	Hudson Soft	Hudson Soft	August 11, 2000 (JP)	Yes	No	No
Bibi Blocksberg: Im Bann Der Hexenkugel	No	—N/a	BVM Produktion	Kiddinx	November 6, 2001 (EU)	No	No	Yes
Bibi und Tina: Fohlen "Felix" in Gefahr	No	—N/a	BVM Produktion	Kiddinx	August 28, 2002 (EU)	No	No	Yes
Bikkuriman 2000: Charging Card GB	Yes	—N/a	Imagineer	Imagineer	June 10, 2000 (JP)	Yes	No	No
Billy Bob's Huntin'-n-Fishin'	No	—N/a	Saffire	Midway	November 17, 1999 (NA, EU)	No	Yes	Yes
Bionic Commando: Elite Forces	No	—N/a	Nintendo Software Technology	Nintendo	January 1, 2000 (NA, AUS)	No	Yes	Yes
Black Bass: Lure Fishing	Yes	—N/a	Hot-B	Majesco	September 1, 1999 (NA, EU)	No	Yes	Yes
The Black Onyx	No	—N/a	Atelier Double	Taito	March 2, 1999 (JP)	Yes	No	No
Blade	No	—N/a	HAL Laboratory	Activision	November 20, 2000 (NA); December 8, 2000 (EU)	No	Yes	Yes
Blaster Master: Enemy Below •Meta Fight EX^{JP}	Yes (Western releases only)	—N/a	Sunsoft	Sunsoft	February 24, 2000 (JP); September 24, 2000 (NA); October 27, 2000 (EU)	Yes	Yes	Yes
Blue's Clues: Blue's Alphabet Book	No	—N/a	Vicarious Visions	Mattel Interactive	January 30, 2001 (NA)	No	Yes	No
Boarder Zone •Supreme Snowboarding^{EU}	No	—N/a	Software Creations	Infogrames	December 1, 1999 (NA, EU)	No	Yes	Yes
Bob et Bobette: Les Dompteurs du Temps	No	—N/a	Engine Software	Witan Entertainment	January 1, 2001 (EU)	No	No	Yes
Bob the Builder: Fix It Fun!	No	—N/a	Tiertex	BBC Multimedia ^{EU} THQ^{NA}	September 1, 2001 (NA); November 10, 2000 (EU)	No	Yes	Yes
Boku no Camp Jou	No	—N/a	D-1000 Project	Naxat Soft	September 22, 2000 (JP)	Yes	No	No
Bomberman Max: Blue Champion •Bomberman Max: Hikari no Yuusha^{JP}	No	—N/a	Hudson Soft	Vatical Entertainment; Hudson Soft^{JP}	December 17, 1999 (JP); May 14, 2000 (NA)	Yes	Yes	No
Bomberman Max: Red Challenger •Bomberman Max: Yami no Senshi^{JP}	No	—N/a	Hudson Soft	Vatical Entertainment; Hudson Soft^{JP}	December 17, 1999 (JP); May 14, 2000 (NA)	Yes	Yes	No
Bomberman Quest	Yes	—N/a	Hudson Soft	Electro Brain; Hudson Soft^{JP} Virgin Interactive^{EU}	December 24, 1998 (JP); November 1999 (NA); May 1999 (EU)	Yes	Yes	Yes
Bomberman Selection	No	—N/a	Hudson Soft	Jupiter Corp.	April 30, 2003 (KOR)	Yes	No	No
Bouken! Dondoko Shima	No	—N/a	D-1000 Project	Global A Entertainment	April 18, 2002 (JP)	Yes	No	No
Brave Saga Shinshou Astaria	No	—N/a	Takara	Takara	January 26, 2001 (JP)	Yes	No	No
Buffy the Vampire Slayer	No	—N/a	Game Brains	THQ	September 25, 2000 (NA); November 10, 2000 (EU)	No	Yes	Yes
Bugs Bunny: Crazy Castle 3	Yes	—N/a	Kemco	Nintendo; Kemco^{JP}	January 29, 1999 (JP, NA, EU)	Yes	Yes	Yes
Bugs Bunny in Crazy Castle 4	No	—N/a	Kemco	Kemco	April 21, 2000 (JP); July 3, 2000 (NA, EU)	Yes	Yes	Yes
A Bug's Life	Yes	—N/a	Tiertex	THQ^{NA} Activision^{EU}	December 1, 1998 (NA); December 1, 1999 (EU)	No	Yes	Yes
Buzz Lightyear of Star Command	No	—N/a	Traveller's Tales	Activision	November 7, 2000 (NA); February 16, 2001 (EU)	No	Yes	Yes
Burger Burger Pocket: Hamburger Simulation	Yes	—N/a	Biox	Gaps Inc.	March 26, 1999 (JP)	Yes	No	No
Burger Paradise International	No	—N/a	Biox	Gaps Inc.	April 21, 2000 (JP)	Yes	No	No
Bust-A-Move 4 •Puzzle Bobble 4^{JP}	Yes	—N/a	Crawfish Interactive	Club Acclaim; Altron^{JP}	April 28, 2000 (JP); June 1999 (NA, EU)	Yes	Yes	Yes
Bust-A-Move Millennium •Puzzle Bobble Millennium^{JP}	No	—N/a	Dreams Co., Ltd.	Club Acclaim; Altron^{JP}	December 22, 2000 (JP); October 27, 2000 (NA); November 17, 2000 (EU)	Yes	Yes	Yes
Caesars Palace II	No	—N/a	RuneCraft Ltd.	Interplay Entertainment	July 1, 1999 (NA, EU)	No	Yes	Yes
Cannon Fodder	No	—N/a	Codemasters	Codemasters	December 5, 2000 (NA); November 24, 2000 (EU)	No	Yes	Yes
Cardcaptor Sakura: Itsumo Sakura-chan to Issho!	Yes	—N/a	M²TO	M²TO	May 15, 1999 (JP)	Yes	No	No
Cardcaptor Sakura: Tomoeda Shougakkou Daiundoukai	No	—N/a	M²TO	M²TO	October 6, 2000 (JP)	Yes	No	No
Carl Lewis Athletics 2000	No	—N/a	Planet Interactive	Ubi Soft	September 15, 2000 (EU)	No	No	Yes
Carmageddon	No	—N/a	Aqua Pacific	Titus Software^{NA} Sales Curve Interactive^{EU}	April 1, 2000 (NA/EU)	No	Yes	Yes
Casper	No	—N/a	G3 Interactive	Interplay Entertainment	May 1, 2000 (NA, EU)	No	Yes	No
Catwoman	No	—N/a	Kemco	Kemco	December 1, 1999 (NA); January 1, 2000 (EU)	No	Yes	Yes
Catz	No	—N/a	Saffire	Mindscape	December 1, 1999 (NA, EU)	No	Yes	Yes
Centipede	Yes	—N/a	Accolade	Majesco	November 30, 1998 (NA); 1998 (EU)	No	Yes	Yes
Championship Motocross 2001 Featuring Ricky Carmichael	No	—N/a	Tiertex	THQ	October 5, 2000 (NA)	No	Yes	No
Chase H.Q.: Secret Police •Taito Memorial: Chase H.Q.^{JP}	Yes	—N/a	Dreams Co., Ltd.	Metro3D^{NA} Gaga Communications Inc.^{EU} Jorudan^{JP}	May 26, 2000 (JP); May 30, 2000 (NA); August 2000 (EU)	Yes	Yes	Yes
Checkmate	Yes	—N/a	Altron	Altron	April 16, 1999 (JP)	Yes	No	No
Chee-Chai Alien	No	Rumble Pak	Creatures, Inc.	Creatures, Inc.	February 27, 2001 (JP)	Yes	No	No
Chessmaster	Yes	—N/a	Park Place Productions	Mindscape	November 15, 1999 (NA, EU)	No	Yes	Yes
Chi to Ase to Namida no Koukou Yakyuu	No	—N/a	J-Wing	J-Wing	November 3, 1999 (JP)	Yes	No	No
Chibi Maruko-chan: Go Chounai Minna de Game Da Yo!	No	—N/a	Epoch	Epoch	August 10, 2001 (JP)	Yes	No	No
Chicken Run	No	—N/a	Blitz Games	THQ	November 3, 2000 (NA); November 24, 2000 (EU)	No	Yes	Yes
Choro Q Hyper GB	No	—N/a	Electronics Application	Takara	July 30, 1999 (JP)	Yes	No	No
Chou Gals! Kotobuki Ran	No	—N/a	Konami	Konami	July 26, 2001 (JP)	Yes	No	No
Chou Gals! Kotobuki Ran 2: Miracle Getting	No	—N/a	Konami	Konami	February 7, 2002 (JP)	Yes	No	No
Classic Bubble Bobble •Taito Memorial: Bubble Bobble^{JP}	Yes	—N/a	Dreams Co., Ltd.	Metro3D^{NA} Gaga Communications Inc.^{EU} Jorudan^{JP}	October 1, 1999 (NA, EU); May 26, 2000 (JP)	Yes	Yes	Yes
Colin McRae Rally	No	—N/a	Spellbound Entertainment	THQ	January 1, 2001 (EU)	No	No	Yes
Columns GB: Tezuka Ozamu Characters	Yes	—N/a	Game Studio	Media Factory	November 5, 1999 (JP)	Yes	No	No
Command Master	No	Tilt sensor	Brain Dock	Enix	November 22, 2000 (JP)	Yes	No	No
Commander Keen	No	—N/a	David A. Palmer Productions	Activision	May 30, 2001 (NA); June 15, 2001 (EU)	No	Yes	Yes
Conker's Pocket Tales	Yes	—N/a	Rare	Rare	June 8, 1999 (NA); 1999 (EU)	No	Yes	Yes
Cool Bricks	No	—N/a	Freestylez	Sales Curve Interactive	December 1, 1999 (EU)	No	No	Yes
Croc	No	—N/a	Virtucraft	THQ	June 6, 2000 (NA); December 1, 2000 (EU)	No	Yes	Yes
Croc 2	No	—N/a	Natsume Co., Ltd.	THQ	January 25, 2001 (NA); February 2, 2001 (EU)	No	Yes	Yes
Cross Hunter: Monster Hunter Version	No	—N/a	Game Village	Game Village	April 12, 2001 (JP)	Yes	No	No
Cross Hunter: Treasure Hunter Version	No	—N/a	Game Village	Game Village	April 12, 2001 (JP)	Yes	No	No
Cross Hunter: X Hunter Version	No	—N/a	Game Village	Game Village	April 12, 2001 (JP)	Yes	No	No
Cruis'n Exotica	No	—N/a	Crawfish Interactive	Midway	November 6, 2000 (NA)	No	Yes	No
Crystalis	No	—N/a	Nintendo Software Technology	Nintendo	June 26, 2000 (NA)	No	Yes	No
Cubix: Robots for Everyone - Race 'N Robots	No	—N/a	Blitz Games	The 3DO Company	November 13, 2001 (US)	No	Yes	No
CyberTiger	No	—N/a	Xantera	Electronic Arts	January 1, 2000 (NA); November 10, 2000 (EU)	No	Yes	Yes
Cyborg Kuro-chan: Devil Fukkatsu!!	No	—N/a	Konami	Konami	March 23, 2000 (JP)	Yes	No	No
Cyborg Kuro-chan 2: White Woods no Gyakushuu	No	—N/a	Konami	Konami	October 19, 2000 (JP)	Yes	No	No
Daa! Daa! Daa! Totsuzen ★ Card de Battle de Uranai!?	No	—N/a	Video System	Video System	December 8, 2000 (JP)	Yes	No	No
Daffy Duck: Fowl Play •Daffy Duck: Auf Schatzsuche^{DE} •Daffy Duck: Subette Koronde Ookanemochi^{JP}	Yes	—N/a	Sunsoft	Sunsoft	January 1, 2000 (JP); December 1999 (NA); 2000 (EU)	Yes	Yes	Yes
Daikaijuu Monogatari: The Miracle of the Zone II	Yes	—N/a	Birthday	Hudson Soft	March 19, 1999 (JP)	Yes	No	No
Daiku no Gen-san: Kachikachi no Tonkachi ga Kachi	Yes	—N/a	Biox	Gaps Inc.	April 28, 2000 (JP)	Yes	No	No
Dance Dance Revolution GB	No	—N/a	KCET	Konami	August 3, 2000 (JP)	Yes	No	No
Dance Dance Revolution GB: Disney Mix	No	—N/a	KCET	Konami	March 29, 2001 (JP)	Yes	No	No
Dance Dance Revolution GB2	No	—N/a	KCET	Konami	November 16, 2000 (JP)	Yes	No	No
Dance Dance Revolution GB3	No	—N/a	KCET	Konami	March 15, 2001 (JP)	Yes	No	No
Dancing Furby	Yes	—N/a	TOSE	Tomy Corporation	December 24, 1999 (JP)	Yes	No	No
Das Geheimnis der Happy Hippo-Insel	No	—N/a	Kritzelkratz 3000	JoWooD Productions	May 17, 2001 (DE)	No	No	Yes
Data-Navi Pro Yakyuu	No	—N/a	Now Production	Nowpro	July 21, 2000 (JP)	Yes	No	No
Data-Navi Pro Yakyuu 2	No	—N/a	Now Production	Nowpro	July 13, 2001 (JP)	Yes	No	No
Dave Mirra Freestyle BMX	No	—N/a	Neon Studios	Acclaim Max Sports	November 9, 2000 (NA); December 8, 2000 (EU)	No	Yes	Yes
David Beckham Soccer	No	—N/a	Yoyo Entertainment	Rage Software	February 8, 2002 (EU)	No	No	Yes
David O'Leary's Total Soccer 2000	No	—N/a	Exient Entertainment	Ubi Soft	January 1, 2000 (EU)	No	No	Yes
Dear Daniel no Sweet Adventure: Kitty-chan o Sagashite	Yes	—N/a	TOSE	Imagineer	July 19, 2000 (JP)	Yes	No	No
Deer Hunter	No	—N/a	Morning Star Multimedia	Vatical Entertainment	December 22, 1999 (NA)	No	Yes	No
Déjà Vu I&II: The Casebooks of Ace Harding •Deja Vu I&II^{JP}	No	—N/a	Infinite Ventures	Vatical Entertainment^{NA} Kemco^{JP}	October 15, 1999 (JP); December 1999 (NA)	Yes	Yes	No
Dejiko no Mahjong Party	No	—N/a	Broccoli	King Records	December 8, 2000 (JP)	Yes	No	No
Denki Blocks	No	—N/a	Denki	Rage Software	September 1, 2001 (EU)	No	No	Yes
Densha de Go!	No	—N/a	Taito	CyberFront	December 10, 1999 (JP)	Yes	No	No
Densha de Go! 2	No	—N/a	Taito	CyberFront	December 8, 2000 (JP)	Yes	No	No
Die Maus	No	—N/a	Bit Managers	Infogrames	January 1, 1999 (EU)	No	No	Yes
Die Maus: Verrueckte Olympiade	No	—N/a	Neon Studios	Infogrames	September 26, 2001 (EU)	No	No	Yes
Die Original Moorhuhn Jagd	No	—N/a	Nival Interactive	Ravensburger Interactive Media	January 1, 2000 (EU)	No	No	Yes
Dino Breeder 3: Gaia Fukkatsu	Yes	—N/a	J-Wing	J-Wing	April 28, 1999 (JP)	Yes	No	No
Dino Breeder 4	Yes	—N/a	J-Wing	J-Wing	April 28, 2000 (JP)	Yes	No	No
Dinosaur	No	—N/a	Digital Eclipse	Ubi Soft	May 19, 2000 (NA); October 6, 2000 (EU)	No	Yes	Yes
Dinosaur'us	No	—N/a	RFX Interactive	Electronic Arts	February 2, 2001 (EU)	No	No	Yes
Diva Starz: Mall Mania	No	—N/a	Digital Eclipse	Vivendi Universal Interactive Publishing	December 3, 2001 (NA)	No	Yes	Yes
Dogz	No	—N/a	Saffire	Mindscape	December 1, 1999 (NA); January 1, 2000 (EU)	No	Yes	Yes
Dokapon?! Millennium Quest	Yes	—N/a	Asmik Ace	Asmik Ace	July 14, 2000 (JP)	Yes	No	No
Doki Doki Densetsu: Mahoujin Guruguru	No	—N/a	Tamtam	Enix	November 17, 2000 (JP)	Yes	No	No
Doki Doki Sasete!!	No	—N/a	Victor Interactive Software	Victor Interactive Software	October 26, 2001 (JP)	Yes	No	No
Donald Duck: Goin' Quackers •Donald Duck: Quack Attack^{EU} •Donald Duck: Daisy o Tsukue!^{JP}	No	—N/a	Ubi Soft Milan	Ubi Soft	December 1, 2000 (JP); October 19, 2000 (NA); October 20, 2000 (EU)	Yes	Yes	Yes
Donkey Kong Country	No	—N/a	Rare	Nintendo	November 17, 2000 (PAL); November 20, 2000 (NA); January 21, 2001 (JP)	Yes	Yes	Yes
Donkey Kong GB: Dinky Kong & Dixie Kong	No	—N/a	Rare	Nintendo	January 28, 2000 (JP)	Yes	No	No
Doraemon: Aruke Aruke Labyrinth	Yes	—N/a	Epoch	Epoch	July 23, 1999 (JP)	Yes	No	No
Doraemon: Kimi to Pet no Monogatari	Yes	—N/a	Epoch	Epoch	March 16, 2001 (JP)	Yes	No	No
Doraemon Kart 2	Yes	—N/a	Epoch	Epoch	March 12, 1999 (JP)	Yes	No	No
Doraemon Memories: Nobita no Omoide Daibouken	Yes	—N/a	Epoch	Epoch	March 10, 2000 (JP)	Yes	No	No
Doraemon no Quiz Boy	No	—N/a	Shogakukan	Shogakukan	April 28, 2000 (JP)	Yes	No	No
Doraemon no Quiz Boy 2	No	—N/a	Shogakukan	Shogakukan	October 4, 2002 (JP)	Yes	No	No
Doraemon no Study Boy: Gakushuu Kanji Game	No	—N/a	Shogakukan	Shogakukan	January 12, 2001 (JP)	Yes	No	No
Doraemon no Study Boy: Kanji Yomikaki Master	No	—N/a	Shogakukan	Shogakukan	July 18, 2003 (JP)	Yes	No	No
Doraemon no Study Boy: Kuku Game	No	—N/a	Shogakukan	Shogakukan	December 20, 2000 (JP)	Yes	No	No
Doug's Big Game	No	—N/a	Magellan Interactive	NewKidCo^{NA} Ubi Soft^{EU}	December 15, 2000 (NA); April 6, 2001 (EU)	No	Yes	Yes
Dr. Rin ni Kiitemite!: Koi no Rin Fuusui	No	—N/a	Will	Hudson Soft	February 21, 2002 (JP)	Yes	No	No
Dracula: Crazy Vampire	No	—N/a	Planet Interactive	DreamCatcher Interactive^{NA} Cryo Interactive^{EU}	October 9, 2001 (NA, EU)	No	Yes	Yes
Dragon Ball Z: Legendary Super Warriors •Dragon Ball Z: Densetsu no Chou Senshi-tachi^{JP}	No	—N/a	Banpresto	Infogrames^{NA/EU} Banpresto ^{JP}	August 9, 2002 (JP); November 8, 2002 (NA); June 30, 2002 (EU)	Yes	Yes	Yes
Dragon Dance •Pocket Color Block^{JP}	Yes	—N/a	Natsume Co., Ltd.	Crave Entertainment^{NA/EU} Bottom Up^{JP}	December 18, 1998 (JP); August 2000 (NA); September 30, 2000 (EU)	Yes	Yes	Yes
Dragon Tales: Dragon Adventures	No	—N/a	Handheld Games	NewKidCo	November 15, 2001 (NA)	No	Yes	No
Dragon Tales: Dragon Wings	No	—N/a	Zed Two Limited	NewKidCo^{NA} Ubi Soft^{EU}	December 16, 2000 (NA, EU)	No	Yes	Yes
Dragon Warrior I & II •Dragon Quest I & II^{JP}	Yes	—N/a	TOSE	Enix	September 23, 1999 (JP); September 27, 2000 (NA)	Yes	Yes	No
Dragon Warrior III •Dragon Quest III^{JP}	No	—N/a	TOSE	Enix	December 8, 2000 (JP); July 7, 2001 (NA)	Yes	Yes	No
Dragon Warrior Monsters •Dragon Quest Monsters: Terry no Wonderland^{JP}	Yes	—N/a	TOSE	Eidos Interactive^{NA/EU} Enix^{JP}	September 25, 1998 (JP); January 25, 2000 (NA); January 2000 (EU)	Yes	Yes	Yes
Dragon Warrior Monsters 2: Cobi's Journey •Dragon Quest Monsters 2: Malta no Fushigina Kagi - Ruka no Tabidachi^{JP}	Yes	—N/a	TOSE	Enix	March 9, 2001 (JP); September 15, 2001 (NA)	Yes	Yes	No
Dragon Warrior Monsters 2: Tara's Adventure •Dragon Quest Monsters 2: Malta no Fushigina Kagi - Iru no Bouken^{JP}	Yes	—N/a	TOSE	Enix	March 9, 2001 (JP); September 15, 2001 (NA)	Yes	Yes	No
Dragon's Lair	No	—N/a	Digital Eclipse	Capcom	January 15, 2001 (NA); August 24, 2001 (EU)	No	Yes	Yes
Driver: You Are the Wheelman •Driver^{EU}	No	—N/a	Crawfish Interactive	Infogrames	April 1, 2000 (NA); January 1, 2001 (EU)	No	Yes	Yes
Dropzone	Yes	—N/a	Awesome Developments	Acclaim Entertainment	January 1, 1999 (EU)	No	No	Yes
DT: Lords of Genomes	Yes	—N/a	Game Studio	Media Factory	May 25, 2001 (JP)	Yes	No	No
Duke Nukem	No	—N/a	Torus Games	GT Interactive	September 10, 1999 (NA, EU)	No	Yes	Yes
The Dukes of Hazzard: Racing for Home •The Dukes of Hazzard^{EU}	No	—N/a	Spellbound Entertainment	SouthPeak Interactive^{NA} Ubi Soft^{EU}	November 7, 2000 (NA, EU)	No	Yes	Yes
Dungeon Savior	Yes	—N/a	J-Wing	J-Wing	August 4, 2000 (JP)	Yes	No	No
DX Jinsei Game	No	—N/a	Takara	Takara	April 27, 2001 (JP)	Yes	No	No
DX Monopoly GB	Yes	—N/a	Takara	Takara	April 21, 2000 (JP)	Yes	No	No
E.T. The Extra-Terrestrial and the Cosmic Garden	No	—N/a	Zed Two Limited	NewKidCo	March 15, 2002 (NA, EU)	No	Yes	Yes
E.T. The Extra-Terrestrial: Digital Companion	No	—N/a	Powerhead Games	NewKidCo	October 18, 2001 (NA)	No	Yes	No
E.T. The Extra-Terrestrial: Escape from Planet Earth •E.T. The Extra-Terrestrial: The 20th Anniversary^{EU}	No	—N/a	Saffire	NewKidCo^{NA} Ubi Soft^{EU}	November 4, 2001 (NA); 2002 (EU)	No	Yes	Yes
Earthworm Jim: Menace 2 the Galaxy	Yes	—N/a	David A. Palmer Productions	Crave Entertainment	November 16, 1999 (NA, EU)	No	Yes	Yes
ECW Hardcore Revolution	No	—N/a	Crawfish Interactive	Acclaim Entertainment	February 1, 2000 (NA, EU)	No	Yes	Yes
Elevator Action EX ^{JP} •Elevator Action^{EU} •Dexter's Laboratory: Robot Rampage^{NA}	No	—N/a	Altron	Taito^{JP} TDK Mediactive^{EU} BAM! Entertainment^{NA}	September 29, 2000 (JP); 2000 (EU); November 23, 2000 (NA)	Yes	Yes	Yes
Elie no Atelier GB	Yes	—N/a	TOSE	Imagineer	January 8, 2000 (JP)	Yes	No	No
The Emperor's New Groove	No	—N/a	Sandbox Studios	Ubi Soft	December 1, 2000 (NA); March 16, 2001 (EU)	No	Yes	Yes
ESPN International Track & Field •International Track & Field: Summer Games^{EU} •Ganbare Nippon! Olympic 2000^{JP}	No	—N/a	Konami	Konami	July 13, 2000 (JP); October 3, 2000 (NA); September 8, 2000 (EU)	Yes	Yes	Yes
ESPN National Hockey Night	No	—N/a	Konami	Konami	March 15, 2001 (NA)	No	Yes	No
Evel Knievel	Yes	—N/a	Tarantula Studios	Rockstar Games^{NA} Take 2 Interactive^{EU}	October 1, 1999 (EU); December 1, 1999 (NA)	No	Yes	Yes
Extreme Ghostbusters	No	—N/a	Magic Pockets	Light and Shadow Production	May 30, 2001 (EU)	No	No	Yes
Extreme Sports with the Berenstain Bears	No	—N/a	Magnin & Associates	Sound Source Interactive	November 1, 2000 (NA, EU)	No	Yes	Yes
The F.A. Premier League Stars 2001	No	—N/a	Krisalis Software	THQ	June 29, 2001 (EU)	No	No	Yes
F1 Championship Season 2000	No	—N/a	Tiertex	EA Sports	December 19, 2000 (EU)	No	No	Yes
F1 Racing Championship	No	—N/a	Ubi Soft	Video System	November 10, 2000 (EU)	No	No	Yes
F-1 World Grand Prix	No	—N/a	Video System	Video System	October 1, 2000 (JP); 2000 (EU)	Yes	No	Yes
F1 World Grand Prix II	No	—N/a	ITL	Konami^{NA/EU>} Video System^{JP}	February 24, 2000 (JP); January 1, 2000 (NA, EU)	Yes	Yes	Yes
F-18 Thunder Strike	No	—N/a	Morning Star Multimedia	Majesco^{NA} Take 2 Interactive^{EU}	May 1, 2000 (NA, EU)	No	Yes	Yes
Fairy Kitty no Kaiun Jiten: Yousei no Kuni no Uranai Shugyou	Yes	—N/a	TOSE	Imagineer	December 11, 1998 (JP)	Yes	No	No
Ferret Monogatari: Watashi no Okini Iri	No	—N/a	Culture Brain	Culture Brain	April 28, 2000 (JP)	Yes	No	No
FIFA 2000	Yes	—N/a	Tiertex	THQ^{NA} EA Sports^{EU}	November 30, 1999 (NA, EU)	No	Yes	Yes
The Fish Files	No	—N/a	7th Sense	Microids	November 30, 2001 (EU); Cancelled (NA)	No	No	Yes
Fisher Price Rescue Heroes Fire Frenzy	No	—N/a	Engine Software	Mattel Interactive	November 7, 2000 (NA)	No	Yes	No
Fix & Foxi - Episode 1: Lupo	No	—N/a	Similis	Ravensburger Interactive Media	November 1, 2000 (EU)	No	No	Yes
The Flintstones: Burgertime in Bedrock	No	—N/a	Conspiracy Entertainment	Classified Games^{NA} Swing! Entertainment Media AG^{DE}	May 30, 2001 (NA)	No	Yes	No
Flipper & Lopaka	No	—N/a	Planet Interactive	Ubi Soft	March 16, 2001 (EU)	No	No	Yes
Force 21	No	—N/a	The Code Monkeys	Red Storm Entertainment	December 1, 2000 (NA)	No	Yes	No
Formula One 2000	No	—N/a	Tarantula Studios	Take 2 Interactive	December 18, 2000 (NA)	No	Yes	No
Fort Boyard	No	—N/a	Microids	Microids	November 9, 2001 (EU)	No	No	Yes
Frogger	Yes	—N/a	Morning Star Multimedia	Majesco	December 31, 1998 (NA); 1997 (EU)	No	Yes	Yes
Frogger 2	No	—N/a	Game Titan	Hasbro Interactive	September 23, 2000 (NA)	No	Yes	No
From TV Animation One Piece: Yume no Luffy Kaizokudan Tanjou!	Yes	—N/a	Alpha Unit	Banpresto	April 27, 2001 (JP)	Yes	No	No
From TV Animation One Piece: Maboroshi no Grand Line Boukenki!	Yes	—N/a	Alpha Unit	Banpresto	June 28, 2002 (JP)	Yes	No	No
Front Row	No	—N/a	KID	KID	October 1, 1999 (JP)	Yes	No	No
Fushigi no Dungeon: Fuurai no Shiren GB2: Sabaku no Majou	No	—N/a	ChunSoft	ChunSoft	July 27, 2001 (JP)	Yes	No	No
Gaia Master Duel: Card Attackers	No	—N/a		Capcom	June 29, 2001 (JP)	Yes	No	No
Gakkyuu Ou Yamazaki	Yes	—N/a		Koei	May 29, 1999 (JP)	Yes	No	No
Gakuen Battle Fishers: Yoky Shiimono wa Tsure	No	—N/a	Konami	Konami	March 30, 2000 (JP)	Yes	No	No
Galaga: Destination Earth	No	—N/a	Pipe Dream Interactive	Hasbro Interactive	September 25, 2000 (NA)	No	Yes	No
Game Boy Wars 2	Yes	—N/a	Hudson Soft	Hudson Soft	November 20, 1998 (JP)	Yes	No	No
Game Boy Wars 3	No	—N/a	Hudson Soft	Hudson Soft	August 30, 2001 (JP)	Yes	No	No
Game Conveni 21	Yes	—N/a		Starfish	May 19, 2000 (JP)	Yes	No	No
Game & Watch Gallery 2 •Game Boy Gallery 3^{AU}	Yes	—N/a	TOSE	Nintendo	November 20, 1998 (NA, EU)	No	Yes	Yes
Game & Watch Gallery 3 •Game Boy Gallery 3^{JP} •Game Boy Gallery 4^{AU}	Yes	—N/a	TOSE	Nintendo	April 8, 1999 (JP); December 6, 1999 (NA); February 1, 2000 (EU)	Yes	Yes	Yes
Ganbare Goemon: Mononoke Dōchū Tobidase Nabe-Bugyō!	Yes	—N/a	Konami	Konami	December 16, 1999 (JP)	Yes	No	No
Ganbare Goemon: Seikūshi Dynamites Arawaru!!	No	—N/a	Konami	Konami	December 21, 2000 (JP)	Yes	No	No
Ganbare Goemon: Tengu-tou no Gyakushuu!	Yes	—N/a	TOSE	Konami	January 14, 1999 (JP)	Yes	No	No
GB Harobots	No	—N/a	Sunrise Interactive	Sunrise Interactive	December 1, 2000 (JP)	Yes	No	No
Gensoumaden Saiyuuki: Sabaku no Shikami	No	—N/a		J-Wing	March 23, 2001 (JP)	Yes	No	No
Gessou! Dangun Racer Onsoku Buster: Dangun Tama	No	—N/a		Imagineer	October 12, 2001 (JP)	Yes	No	No
Get Mushi Club: Minna no Konchuu Daizukan	Yes	Rumble Pak	Jaleco Entertainment	Jaleco Entertainment	August 13, 1999 (JP)	Yes	No	No
Gex: Enter the Gecko	Yes	—N/a	David A. Palmer Productions	Crave Entertainment^{NA} Interplay Entertainment^{EU}	December 1, 1998 (NA, EU)	No	Yes	Yes
Gex 3: Deep Pocket Gecko •Gex 3: Deep Cover Gecko^{EU}	No	—N/a	David A. Palmer Productions	Eidos Interactive	November 15, 1999 (NA); 2000 (EU)	No	Yes	Yes
Ghosts 'n Goblins	Yes	—N/a	Digital Eclipse	Capcom	January 1, 2000 (NA); August 24, 2001 (EU)	No	Yes	Yes
Gift •Gifty^{DE}	No	—N/a	Cryo Interactive	Cryo Interactive	August 31, 2001 (EU)	No	No	Yes
Gobs of Games •Games Frenzy^{EU}	No	—N/a	2N Productions	The 3DO Company	September 1, 2000 (NA, EU)	No	Yes	Yes
Godzilla: The Series	Yes	—N/a	Crawfish Interactive	Crave Entertainment	December 1, 1999 (NA); March 1, 2000 (EU)	No	Yes	Yes
Godzilla: The Series - Monster Wars	No	—N/a	Crawfish Interactive	Crave Entertainment	November 20, 2000 (NA, EU)	No	Yes	Yes
Gold and Glory: The Road to El Dorado	No	—N/a	Planet Interactive	Ubi Soft	April 30, 2000 (NA); August 4, 2000 (EU)	No	Yes	Yes
Golf Daisuki	Yes	—N/a	KID	KID	October 29, 1999 (JP)	Yes	No	No
Golf Ou: The King of Golf	Yes	—N/a	Digital Kids	Digital Kids	July 16, 1999 (JP)	Yes	No	No
Gonta no Okiraku Daibouken	No	—N/a		Lay-Up	September 29, 2000 (JP)	Yes	No	No
Goraku Ou Tango!	Yes	—N/a		J-Wing	February 11, 2000 (JP)	Yes	No	No
Grandia: Parallel Trippers	No	—N/a	Game Arts	Hudson Soft	December 22, 2000 (JP)	Yes	No	No
Grand Theft Auto	Yes	—N/a	Tarantula Studios	Rockstar Games	November 22, 1999 (NA); October 1, 1999 (EU)	No	Yes	Yes
Grand Theft Auto 2	No	—N/a	Tarantula Studios	Rockstar Games	December 1, 2000 (NA); November 10, 2000 (EU)	No	Yes	Yes
Gran Duel: Shinki Dungeon no Hihou	No	—N/a	Studio VeX	Bottom Up	December 10, 1999 (JP)	Yes	No	No
The Great Battle Pocket	Yes	—N/a	Alpha Unit	Banpresto	December 3, 1999 (JP)	Yes	No	No
Gremlins: Unleashed!	No	—N/a	Planet Interactive	Light and Shadow Production	September 23, 2001 (EU)	No	No	Yes
The Grinch	No	—N/a	Konami	Konami	November 22, 2000 (JP); November 24, 2000 (NA, EU)	Yes	Yes	Yes
Guruguru Garakutas	Yes	—N/a	Multimedia Intelligence Transfer	Atlus	September 10, 1999 (JP)	Yes	No	No
Guruguru Town Hanamaru-kun	No	—N/a		J-Wing	April 27, 2001 (JP)	Yes	No	No
Gute Zeiten Schlechte Zeiten Quiz	No	—N/a	Software 2000	Software 2000	May 1, 2000 (DE)	No	No	Yes
Gyouten Ningen Batseelor: Doctor Guy no Yabou	No	—N/a		Konami	November 1, 2001 (JP)	Yes	No	No
Halloween Racer	No	—N/a	Visual Impact	Microids	January 1, 1999 (EU)	No	No	Yes
Hamster Club	Yes	—N/a	Nekogumi	Jorudan	October 29, 1999 (JP)	Yes	No	No
Hamster Club 2	Yes	—N/a	Nekogumi	Jorudan	December 15, 2000 (JP)	Yes	No	No
Hamster Club: Awasete Chuu	No	—N/a	Nekogumi	Jorudan	September 22, 2000 (JP)	Yes	No	No
Hamster Club: Oshiema Chuu	No	—N/a	Nekogumi	Jorudan	September 21, 2001 (JP)	Yes	No	No
Hamster Monogatari GB + Magi Ham Mahou no Shoujo	No	—N/a		Culture Brain	August 9, 2002 (JP)	Yes	No	No
Hamster Paradise	Yes	—N/a	Shimada Kikaku	Atlus	February 26, 1999 (JP)	Yes	No	No
Hamster Paradise 2	No	—N/a	Digital Kids	Atlus	March 17, 2000 (JP)	Yes	No	No
Hamster Paradise 3	No	—N/a	Digital Kids	Atlus	December 15, 2000 (JP)	Yes	No	No
Hamster Paradise 4	No	—N/a	Digital Kids	Atlus	September 28, 2001 (JP)	Yes	No	No
Hamtaro: Tomodachi Daisakusen Dechu	No	—N/a	Pax Softonica	Nintendo	September 8, 2000 (JP)	Yes	No	No
Hamtaro: Ham-Hams Unite! •Tottoko Hamtaro 2: Hamchans Daishuugou Dechu^{JP}	No	—N/a	Pax Softonica	Nintendo	April 21, 2001 (JP); October 28, 2002 (NA); January 10, 2003 (EU)	Yes	Yes	Yes
Hanasaka Tenshi Tenten-kun no Beat Breaker	Yes	—N/a	ITL	Konami	April 28, 1999 (JP)	Yes	No	No
Hana Yori Dango: Another Love Story	No	—N/a		TDK Core	July 27, 2001 (JP)	Yes	No	No
Hands of Time	No	—N/a	Mirage	Titus Software	October 2, 2001 (NA); June 29, 2001 (EU)	No	Yes	Yes
Harley-Davidson: Race Across America	No	—N/a	Running Dog Software	WizardWorks	December 22, 2000 (NA)	No	Yes	No
Harry Potter and the Chamber of Secrets	No	—N/a	Griptonite Games	Electronic Arts	November 5, 2002 (NA); November 15, 2002 (EU)	No	Yes	Yes
Harry Potter and the Philosopher's Stone •Harry Potter and the Sorcerer's Stone^{NA} •Harry Potter to Kenja no Ishi^{JP}	No	—N/a	Griptonite Games	Electronic Arts^{NA/EU} EA Victor^{JP}	December 1, 2001 (JP); November 15, 2001 (NA); November 16, 2001 (EU)	Yes	Yes	Yes
Harvest Moon GBC •Harvest Moon GB^{EU}	Yes	—N/a	TOSE	Natsume Inc.^{NA} Nintendo^{EU}	November 1, 1999 (NA); 1999 (EU)	No	Yes	Yes
Harvest Moon 2 GBC •Bokujo Monogatari 2 GB^{JP}	Yes	—N/a	Victor Interactive Software	Victor Interactive Software^{JP} Natsume Inc.^{NA} Ubi Soft^{EU}	August 6, 1999 (JP); November 7, 2000 (NA); March 30, 2001 (EU)	Yes	Yes	Yes
Harvest Moon 3 GBC •Bokujo Monogatari GB3: Boy Meets Girl^{JP}	No	—N/a	Victor Interactive Software	Victor Interactive Software^{JP} Natsume Inc.^{NA}	September 29, 2000 (JP); November 14, 2001 (NA)	Yes	Yes	No
Hello Kitty's Cube Frenzy	Yes	—N/a	Torus Games	NewKidCo	December 28, 1999 (NA); March 30, 2001 (EU)	No	Yes	Yes
Hello Kitty no Beads Koubou	Yes	—N/a		Imagineer	July 17, 1999 (JP)	Yes	No	No
Hello Kitty no Happy House	No	—N/a		MTO	March 2, 2002 (JP)	Yes	No	No
Hello Kitty no Magical Museum	Yes	—N/a	Atelier Double	Imagineer	April 28, 1999 (JP)	Yes	No	No
Hello Kitty no Sweet Adventure: Daniel-kun ni Aitai	Yes	—N/a	TOSE	Imagineer	July 19, 2000 (JP)	Yes	No	No
Hello Kitty to Dear Daniel no Dream Adventure	No	—N/a	TOSE	Imagineer	April 14, 2001 (JP)	Yes	No	No
Hercules: The Legendary Journeys	No	—N/a	Titus Software	Titus Software	September 14, 2001 (EU)	No	No	Yes
Heroes of Might and Magic	No	—N/a	KnowWonder	The 3DO Company	April 29, 2000 (NA); October 20, 2000 (EU)	No	Yes	Yes
Heroes of Might and Magic II	No	—N/a	KnowWonder	The 3DO Company	December 1, 2000 (NA); March 16, 2001 (EU)	No	Yes	Yes
Hero Hero-kun	No	—N/a	TOSE	Imagineer	February 9, 2001 (JP)	Yes	No	No
Hexcite: The Shapes of Victory •Glocal HexCite^{JP}	Yes	—N/a	Landwarf	Ubi Soft^{NA/EU} NEC Interchannel^{JP}	October 21, 1998 (JP); January 10, 1999 (NA, EU)	Yes	Yes	Yes
Hiryuu no Ken Retsuden GB	No	—N/a		Culture Brain	December 22, 2000 (JP)	Yes	No	No
Hissatsu Pachinko Boy: CR Monster House	No	—N/a		Sunsoft	March 31, 2000 (JP)	Yes	No	No
Hole in One Golf •Golf de Oha Suta^{JP}	Yes	Rumble Pak	Natsume Co., Ltd.	Epoch ^{JP} Natsume Inc.^{NA}	April 23, 1999 (JP); August 30, 1999 (NA)	Yes	Yes	No
Hollywood Pinball	Yes	—N/a	Tarantula Studios	Take-Two Interactive^{EU} Starfish^{JP}	December 23, 1999 (JP); 1999 (EU)	Yes	No	Yes
Honkaku 4 Ninda Mahjong: Mahjong Ou	Yes	—N/a	Warashi	Warashi	February 19, 1999 (JP)	Yes	No	No
Honkaku Hanafuda GB	No	—N/a		Altron	February 24, 2000 (JP)	Yes	No	No
Honkaku Shougi: Shougi Ou	Yes	—N/a	Warashi	Warashi	November 13, 1998 (JP)	Yes	No	No
Honkaku Taisen Shougi Ayumu	Yes	—N/a		Culture Brain	February 18, 2000 (JP)	Yes	No	No
Hot Wheels: Stunt Track Driver	Yes	—N/a	Lucky Chicken Games	Mattel Interactive	January 1, 2000 (NA); June 1, 2000 (EU)	No	Yes	Yes
Hoyle Card Games	No	—N/a	Sandbox Interactive	Sierra On-Line	December 1, 2000 (NA)	No	Yes	No
Hoyle Casino	No	—N/a	Pulsar Interactive	Sierra On-Line	October 24, 2000 (NA)	No	Yes	No
Hugo 2½	Yes	—N/a	Bit Managers	Infogrames	January 1, 1999 (EU)	No	No	Yes
Hugo: Black Diamond Fever	No	—N/a	ITE Media	ITE Media	December 7, 2001 (EU)	No	No	Yes
Hugo: The Evil Mirror	No	—N/a	ITE Media	ITE Media	May 2, 2002 (EU)	No	No	Yes
Hunter X Hunter: Hunter no Keifu	No	—N/a	Konami	Konami	June 15, 2000 (JP)	Yes	No	No
Hunter X Hunter: Kindan no Hihou	No	—N/a	ITL	Konami	April 12, 2001 (JP)	Yes	No	No
Hype: The Time Quest	No	—N/a	Planet Interactive	Ubi Soft	September 15, 2000 (EU)	No	No	Yes
Ide Yosuke no Mahjong Kyoushitsu GB	No	—N/a		Athena	June 30, 2000 (JP)	Yes	No	No
Indiana Jones and the Infernal Machine	No	—N/a	HotGen	THQ	March 22, 2001 (NA); May 4, 2001 (EU)	No	Yes	Yes
Inspector Gadget: Operation Madkactus	No	—N/a	RFX Interactive	Ubi Soft	December 1, 2000 (EU); March 1, 2001 (NA)	No	Yes	Yes
International Karate 2000	No	—N/a	Studio 3	Studio 3	November 24, 2000 (EU)	No	No	Yes
International Rally •Cross Country Racing^{EU} •It's a World Rally^{JP}	Yes	—N/a	Konami	Konami	May 13, 1999 (JP); September 1, 2000 (NA, EU)	Yes	Yes	Yes
International Superstar Soccer '99 •World Soccer GB2^{JP}	Yes	—N/a	Konami	Konami	June 24, 1999 (JP); January 1, 2000 (NA); May 15, 1999 (EU)	Yes	Yes	Yes
International Superstar Soccer 2000 •World Soccer GB 2000^{JP}	No	—N/a	Konami	Konami	July 6, 2000 (JP); December 1, 2000 (NA); September 15, 2000 (EU)	Yes	Yes	Yes
International Track & Field •Hyper Olympic Track & Field GB^{JP}	Yes	—N/a	Konami	Konami	July 1, 1999 (JP); January 19, 2000 (NA); November 1, 1999 (EU)	Yes	Yes	Yes
Itsudemo Pachinko GB: CR Monster House	No	—N/a	Graphic Research	Tamsoft	July 4, 2000 (JP)	Yes	No	No
Jagainu-kun	No	—N/a	Pack-In-Video	Victor Interactive Software	March 24, 2000 (JP)	Yes	No	No
Jankyuusei: Cosplay ★ Paradise	No	—N/a		élf	April 27, 2001 (JP)	Yes	No	No
Janosch: Das grosse Panama-Spiel	No	—N/a	NEON Software GmbH	Infogrames	January 1, 1999 (EU)	No	No	Yes
Jaguar Mishin Sashi Senyou Soft: Mario Family	No	Jaguar's JN-100/JN-2000 sewing machines	Natsume Co., Ltd.	Jaguar	August 27, 2001 (JP)	Yes	No	No
Jeff Gordon XS Racing	Yes	—N/a	Natsume Co., Ltd.	ASC Games	November 11, 1999 (NA)	No	Yes	No
Jeremy McGrath Supercross 2000	No	—N/a	M4 Entertainment	Acclaim Sports	April 6, 2000 (NA); November 24, 2000 (EU)	No	Yes	Yes
Jet de Go!: Let's go by Airliner	No	—N/a		Altron	October 27, 2000 (JP)	Yes	No	No
Jim Henson's Bear in the Big Blue House	No	—N/a	Ubi Soft	Ubi Soft	March 21, 2002 (NA); 2001 (EU)	No	Yes	Yes
Jim Henson's Muppets	Yes (some European cartridges only)	—N/a	Tarantula Studios	Take 2 Interactive	April 1, 2000 (NA); March 1, 2000 (EU)	No	Yes	Yes
Jimmy White's Cue Ball	No	—N/a	Vicarious Visions	Vatical Entertainment	December 22, 2000 (EU)	No	No	Yes
Jinsei Game: Tomedachi Takusan Tsukurouyo!	Yes	—N/a	Alpha Unit	Takara	April 23, 1999 (JP)	Yes	No	No
Jissen ni Yakudatsu Tsumego	No	—N/a	Pony Canyon	Pony Canyon	August 11, 2000 (JP)	Yes	No	No
J.League Excite Stage GB	No	—N/a	Art	Epoch	August 13, 1999 (JP)	Yes	No	No
J.League Excite Stage Tactics	No	—N/a		Epoch	July 20, 2001 (JP)	Yes	No	No
Jisedai Begoma Battle Beyblade	No	—N/a	Rokumendo	Hudson Soft	July 23, 1999 (JP)	Yes	No	No
John Romero's Daikatana	No	—N/a	Will Co., Ltd.	Kemco	May 1, 2001 (JP); Cancelled (NA); September 29, 2000 (EU)	Yes	No	Yes
Joryuu Janshi ni Chousen GB: Watashitachi ni Chousen Shitene	Yes	—N/a		Culture Brain	December 17, 1999 (JP)	Yes	No	No
JumpStart: Dino Adventure Field Trip	No	—N/a	Digital Illusions	Knowledge Adventure	October 18, 2001 (NA)	No	Yes	No
The Jungle Book: Mowgli's Wild Adventure	No	—N/a	Ubi Soft	Ubi Soft	November 20, 2000 (NA); December 1, 2000 (EU)	No	Yes	Yes
Juukou Senki Bullet Battlers	Yes	—N/a	KCEK	Konami	October 21, 1999 (JP)	Yes	No	No
Kaijin Zona	Yes	—N/a	Vistec	Nintendo	October 21, 2000 (JP)	Yes	No	No
Kaitei Densetsu!! Treasure World	Yes	—N/a	Nexus Interact	Dazz	August 11, 2000 (JP)	Yes	No	No
Kakurenbo Battle Monster Tactics	No	—N/a		Nintendo	November 21, 2000 (JP)	Yes	No	No
Kakutou Ryouri Densetsu Bistro Recipe: Gekitou ★ Foodon Battle Hen	Yes	—N/a	Red 5 Software	Banpresto	October 8, 1999 (JP)	Yes	No	No
Kakutou Ryouri Densetsu Bistro Recipe: Kettou ★ Bistgarm Hen	Yes	—N/a	Red 5 Software	Banpresto	December 10, 1999 (JP)	Yes	No	No
Kandume Monsters Parfait	Yes	—N/a	Airsystem Tokyo	Starfish	June 4, 1999 (JP)	Yes	No	No
Kanji Boy	Yes	—N/a		J-Wing	June 3, 1999 (JP)	Yes	No	No
Kanji Boy 2	Yes	—N/a		J-Wing	June 30, 2000 (JP)	Yes	No	No
Kanji Boy 3	No	—N/a	J-Wing	J-Wing	June 5, 2003 (JP)	Yes	No	No
Kanji de Puzzle	Yes	—N/a		MTO	April 28, 2000 (JP)	Yes	No	No
Käpt'n Blaubär: Die Verrückte Schatzsuche	No	—N/a	Shin'en	Ravensburger Interactive Media	January 10, 2001 (DE)	No	No	Yes
Karamuchou wa Oosawagi!: Okawari!	Yes	—N/a	Starfish	Starfish	August 1, 2000 (JP)	Yes	No	No
Karamuchou wa Oosawagi!: Porinkiis to Okashina Nakamatachi	Yes	—N/a	Starfish	Starfish	December 11, 1998 (JP)	Yes	No	No
Karan Koron Gakuen: Hanafuda Mahjong	No	—N/a		J-Wing	July 28, 2000 (JP)	Yes	No	No
Kaseki Sousei Reborn II: Monster Digger	Yes	—N/a	Starfish	Starfish	February 12, 1999 (JP)	Yes	No	No
Katou Ichi-Ni-San Kudan: Shougi Kyoushitsu	Yes	—N/a		Culture Brain	April 9, 2000 (JP)	Yes	No	No
Kawaii Pet Shop Monogatari	Yes	—N/a		Taito	September 23, 1999 (JP)	Yes	No	No
Kawaii Pet Shop Monogatari 2	Yes	—N/a	Taito	Taito	December 22, 2000 (JP)	Yes	No	No
Keep the Balance	No	—N/a	Karma Studios	JoWooD Productions	November 2, 2001 (EU)	No	No	Yes
Keibajou he Gyoukou! Wide	Yes	—N/a		Hect	April 28, 2000 (JP)	Yes	No	No
Keitai Denju Telefang: Power Version	Yes	Real-time clock	Natsume Co., Ltd.	Smilesoft	November 3, 2000 (JP)	Yes	No	No
Keitai Denju Telefang: Speed Version	Yes	Real-time clock	Natsume Co., Ltd.	Smilesoft	November 3, 2000 (JP)	Yes	No	No
Kelly Club: Clubhouse Fun •Shelly Club^{EU}	No	—N/a	Vicarious Visions	Vivendi Universal Games	October 31, 2001 (NA, EU)	No	Yes	Yes
Ken Griffey Jr.'s Slugfest	No	—N/a	Software Creations	Nintendo	June 1, 1999 (NA)	No	Yes	No
Kettou Transformers Beast Wars: Beast Senshi Saikyo Ketteisen	Yes	—N/a	Gaibrain	Takara	March 19, 1999 (JP)	Yes	No	No
Kidou Senkan Nadesico: Ruri Ruri Mahjong	No	—N/a	Studio Saizensen	King Records	December 24, 1999 (JP)	Yes	No	No
Kindaichi Shounen no Jikenbo: 10nenme no Shoutaijou	Yes	—N/a	Aspect	Banpresto	December 16, 2000 (JP)	Yes	No	No
Kinniku Banzuke GB: Chousensha wa Kimida!	Yes	—N/a	KCE Sapporo	Konami	November 25, 1999 (JP)	Yes	No	No
Kinniku Banzuke GB2: Mezase! Muscle Champion	Yes	—N/a		Konami	August 10, 2000 (JP)	Yes	No	No
Kinniku Banzuke GB3: Shinseiki Survival Retsuden!	No	—N/a		Konami	February 22, 2001 (JP)	Yes	No	No
Kirby Tilt 'n' Tumble	No	Tilt sensor	Nintendo R&D2	Nintendo	August 23, 2000 (JP); April 11, 2001 (NA)	Yes	Yes	No
Kirikou	No	—N/a	Planet Interactive	Wanadoo Edition	November 16, 2001 (EU)	No	No	Yes
Kisekae Series 2: Oshare Nikki	No	—N/a		Victor Interactive Software	March 23, 2001 (JP)	Yes	No	No
Kisekae Series 3: Kisekae Hamster	No	—N/a	Kouyousha	Victor Interactive Software	December 21, 2001 (JP)	Yes	No	No
Klax	No	—N/a	Digital Eclipse	Midway	April 1, 1999 (NA)	No	Yes	No
Klustar	Yes	—N/a	Rebellion	Infogrames	July 1, 1999 (NA, EU)	No	Yes	Yes
Knockout Kings	No	—N/a	Digital Eclipse	EA Sports	December 7, 1999 (NA)	No	Yes	No
K.O.: The Pro Boxing	No	—N/a		Altron	August 11, 2000 (JP)	Yes	No	No
Konami GB Collection Vol.1	Yes	—N/a	Konami	Konami	January 1, 2000 (EU)	No	No	Yes
Konami GB Collection Vol.2	Yes	—N/a	Konami	Konami	January 1, 2000 (EU)	No	No	Yes
Konami GB Collection Vol.3	Yes	—N/a	Konami	Konami	May 1, 2000 (EU)	No	No	Yes
Konami GB Collection Vol.4	Yes	—N/a	Konami	Konami	May 1, 2000 (EU)	No	No	Yes
Konchuu Fighters	No	—N/a	Digital Kids	Digital Kids	July 26, 2002 (JP)	Yes	No	No
Konchuu Hakase 2	Yes	—N/a	J-Wing	J-Wing	July 23, 1999 (JP)	Yes	No	No
Konchuu Hakase 3	No	—N/a		J-Wing	July 27, 2001 (JP)	Yes	No	No
Koushien Pocket	Yes	—N/a	Magical Company (Mahou)	Magical Company (Mahou)	March 12, 1999 (JP)	Yes	No	No
Koto Battle: Tengai no Moribito	No	—N/a	AlphaDream	Alphastar	March 9, 2001 (JP)	Yes	No	No
KRTL: Jay und Die Spielzeugdiebe	No	—N/a	Eclipse Entertainment	THQ	June 30, 2000 (DE)	No	No	Yes
The Land Before Time	No	—N/a	Eclipse Entertainment	Conspiracy Entertainment	July 14, 2001 (NA); June 29, 2001 (EU)	No	Yes	Yes
Las Vegas Cool Hand •Cool Hand^{EU}	Yes	—N/a	Tarantula Studios	Take 2 Interactive	December 1, 1998 (NA, EU)	No	Yes	Yes
Laura	No	—N/a	Planet Interactive	Ubi Soft	December 6, 2000 (NA); December 8, 2000 (EU)	No	Yes	Yes
Legend of the River King •Legend of the River King GB^{EU}	Yes	—N/a	TOSE	Natsume Inc.	November 23, 1999 (NA); December 14, 2000 (EU)	No	Yes	Yes
Legend of the River King 2 •Kawa no Nushi Tsuri 4^{JP}	Yes	Rumble Pak (JP only)	Victor Interactive Software	Victor Interactive Software ^{JP} Natsume Inc.^{NA} Ubi Soft ^{EU}	July 16, 1999 (JP); April 17, 2001 (NA); March 30, 2001 (EU)	Yes	Yes	Yes
The Legend of Zelda: Link's Awakening DX	Yes	—N/a	Nintendo EAD	Nintendo	December 12, 1998 (JP); December 15, 1998 (NA); January 1, 1999 (EU)	Yes	Yes	Yes
The Legend of Zelda: Oracle of Ages	No	GBA Special Features	Flagship	Nintendo	February 27, 2001 (JP); May 14, 2001 (NA); October 5, 2001 (EU)	Yes	Yes	Yes
The Legend of Zelda: Oracle of Seasons	No	GBA Special Features	Flagship	Nintendo	February 27, 2001 (JP); May 14, 2001 (NA); October 5, 2001 (EU)	Yes	Yes	Yes
Lego Alpha Team	No	—N/a	Climax Studios	Lego Media	November 1, 2000 (NA, EU)	No	Yes	Yes
Lego Island 2: The Brickster's Revenge	No	—N/a	Crawfish Interactive	Lego Media	March 30, 2001 (NA, EU)	No	Yes	Yes
Lego Racers	No	—N/a	Climax Studios	Lego Media	December 29, 2000 (NA, EU)	No	Yes	Yes
Lego Stunt Rally	No	—N/a	Graphic State Games	Lego Media	December 29, 2000 (NA, EU)	No	Yes	Yes
Lemmings & Oh No! More Lemmings •Lemmings VS^{JP}	No	—N/a	J-Wing	Take 2 Interactive^{NA} J-Wing^{JP}	April 7, 2000 (JP); December 1, 2000 (NA)	Yes	Yes	No
Les Visiteurs	Yes	—N/a	Gaumont Multimedia	Ubi Soft	November 26, 1999 (EU)	No	No	Yes
Lil' Monster •Gem Gem Monster^{JP}	Yes	—N/a	KID	Agetec^{NA} KID^{JP}	July 30, 1999 (JP); August 1, 2000 (NA)	Yes	Yes	No
The Lion King: Simba's Mighty Adventure	No	—N/a	Torus Games	Activision	December 1, 2000 (NA); March 9, 2001 (EU)	No	Yes	Yes
Little Magic	No	—N/a	Altron	Altron	November 26, 1999 (JP)	Yes	No	No
The Little Mermaid II: Pinball Frenzy	No	Rumble Pak	Left Field Productions	Nintendo	September 24, 2000 (NA); March 16, 2001 (EU)	No	Yes	Yes
Little Nicky	No	—N/a	Digital Eclipse	Ubi Soft	December 1, 2000 (NA)	No	Yes	No
Lode Runner: Domudomu Dan no Yabou	Yes	—N/a		XING Entertainment	April 28, 2000 (JP)	Yes	No	No
Lodoss Tou Senki: Eiyuu Kishiden GB	Yes	—N/a	Tomy	Tomy	December 11, 1998 (JP)	Yes	No	No
Logical	No	—N/a	Conspiracy Entertainment	Sunsoft^{NA} THQ^{EU}	April 1, 1999 (NA, EU)	No	Yes	Yes
Looney Tunes	Yes	—N/a	Sunsoft	Sunsoft	September 1, 1999 (NA, EU)	No	Yes	Yes
Looney Tunes: Carrot Crazy •Bugs Bunny & Lola Bunny: Operation Carrot Patch^{EU}	Yes	—N/a	Bit Managers	Infogrames	January 1, 1999 (NA); 1998 (EU)	No	Yes	Yes
Looney Tunes: Marvin Strikes Back! •Looney Tunes Collector: Martian Revenge!^{EU}	No	—N/a	Infogrames	Infogrames	November 23, 2000 (NA, EU)	No	Yes	Yes
Looney Tunes: Twouble! •Sylvester & Tweety: Breakfast on the Run^{EU}	Yes	—N/a	Bit Managers	Infogrames	December 1, 1998 (NA, EU)	No	Yes	Yes
Looney Tunes Collector: Alert! •Looney Tunes Collector: Martian Alert!^{EU} •Looney Tunes Collector: Martian Quest!^{JP}	No	—N/a	Infogrames	Infogrames^{NA/EU} Syscom^{JP}	December 14, 2001 (JP); June 24, 2000 (NA, EU)	Yes	Yes	Yes
Looney Tunes Racing	No	—N/a	Xantera	Infogrames	December 1, 2000 (NA)	No	Yes	No
Love Hina Party	No	—N/a		Marvelous Entertainment	January 26, 2001 (JP)	Yes	No	No
Love Hina Pocket	No	—N/a		Marvelous Entertainment	August 4, 2000 (JP)	Yes	No	No
Luca no Puzzle de Daibouken!	Yes	—N/a		Human Entertainment	June 11, 1999 (JP)	Yes	No	No
Lucky Luke	No	—N/a	Infogrames	Infogrames	July 9, 1999 (NA); May 1, 1999 (EU)	No	Yes	Yes
Lucky Luke: Desperado Train	No	—N/a	Infogrames	Infogrames	January 1, 2000 (EU)	No	No	Yes
Lufia: The Legend Returns •Estpolis Denki: Yomigaeru Densetsu^{JP}	No	—N/a	Neverland	Natsume Inc.^{NA} Taito^{JP} Ubi Soft^{EU}	September 7, 2001 (JP); September 20, 2001 (NA); October 23, 2001 (EU)	Yes	Yes	Yes
M&M's Minis Madness	No	—N/a	Pipe Dream Interactive	Majesco^{NA} JoWooD Productions^{EU}	December 8, 2000 (NA); September 7, 2001 (EU)	No	Yes	Yes
Macross 7: Ginga no Heart o Furuwasero!!	No	—N/a	Aisystem Tokyo	Epoch	March 17, 2000 (JP)	Yes	No	No
Madden NFL 2000	Yes	—N/a	Tiertex	THQ^{NA} EA Sports^{EU}	November 1, 1999 (NA, EU)	No	Yes	Yes
Madden NFL 2001	No	—N/a	3d6 Games	EA Sports	November 13, 2000 (NA)	No	Yes	No
Madden NFL 2002	No	—N/a	3d6 Games	EA Sports	September 1, 2001 (NA)	No	Yes	No
Magi Nation	No	—N/a	Interactive Imagination	Interactive Imagination	March 15, 2001 (NA)	No	Yes	No
Magical Chase GB: Minarai Mahoutsukai Kenja no Tani e	No	—N/a		Micro Cabin	August 4, 2000 (JP)	Yes	No	No
Magical Drop	No	—N/a	Conspiracy Entertainment	Classified Games^{NA} Swing! Entertainment AG^{DE}	October 18, 2000 (NA)	No	Yes	No
Magical Tetris Challenge •Tetris Adventure: Susume Mickey to Nakamatachi^{JP}	No	—N/a	Capcom	Capcom^{NA} Activision^{EU}	November 12, 1999 (JP); February 17, 2000 (NA); March 24, 2000 (EU)	Yes	Yes	Yes
Mahjong Joou	Yes	—N/a		Warashi	April 28, 2000 (JP)	Yes	No	No
Mahjong Quest	Yes	—N/a	J-Wing	J-Wing	December 23, 1998 (JP)	Yes	No	No
Majokko Mari-chan no Kisekae Monogatari	Yes	—N/a		Pack-In-Video	September 10, 1999 (JP)	Yes	No	No
Marble Madness	No	—N/a	Digital Eclipse	Midway	December 1, 1999 (NA); March 13, 2000 (EU)	No	Yes	Yes
Marie no Atelier GB	Yes	—N/a	TOSE	Imagineer	January 8, 2000 (JP)	Yes	No	No
Mario Golf	No	—N/a	Camelot Software Planning	Nintendo	August 10, 1999 (JP); October 5, 1999 (NA); October 26, 1999 (EU)	Yes	Yes	Yes
Mario Tennis	No	—N/a	Camelot Software Planning	Nintendo	November 1, 2000 (JP); January 16, 2001 (NA); February 2, 2001 (EU)	Yes	Yes	Yes
Mary-Kate & Ashley: Crush Course	No	—N/a	Crawfish Interactive	Club Acclaim	November 1, 2001 (NA, EU)	No	Yes	Yes
Mary-Kate and Ashley: Get A Clue	Yes	—N/a	Crawfish Interactive	Club Acclaim	June 1, 2000 (NA, EU)	No	Yes	Yes
Mary-Kate & Ashley: Pocket Planner	Yes	—N/a	Powerhead Games	Club Acclaim	November 29, 2000 (NA); March 2, 2001 (EU)	No	Yes	Yes
Mary-Kate & Ashley: Winners Circle	No	—N/a	M4 Limited	Club Acclaim	March 2, 2001 (NA); May 25, 2001 (EU)	No	Yes	Yes
The Mask of Zorro	No	—N/a	Saffire	Sunsoft^{NA} Ubi Soft^{EU}	January 14, 2000 (NA, EU)	No	Yes	Yes
Mat Hoffman's Pro BMX	No	—N/a	HotGen	Activision	May 14, 2001 (NA); June 15, 2001 (EU)	No	Yes	Yes
Matchbox Caterpillar Construction Zone	Yes	—N/a	Realtime Associates	Mattel Interactive	January 1, 2000 (NA/EU)	No	Yes	Yes
Matchbox Emergency Patrol	No	—N/a	Lucky Chicken Games	THQ	June 1, 2001 (NA, DE)	No	Yes	Yes
Maya the Bee & Her Friends	Yes	—N/a	Crawfish Interactive	Acclaim Entertainment	January 1, 1999 (EU)	No	No	Yes
Maya the Bee: Garden Adventures •Die Biene Maja: Auf Der Klatschmohnwiese^{DE}	No	—N/a	Neon Software	Acclaim Entertainment	November 17, 2000 (EU)	No	No	Yes
McDonald's Monogatari: Honobono Tenchou Ikusei Game	No	—N/a		TDK Core	July 20, 2001 (JP)	Yes	No	No
Medarot 2: Kabuto Version	Yes	—N/a	Natsume Co., Ltd.	Imagineer	July 23, 1999 (JP)	Yes	No	No
Medarot 2: Kuwagata Version	Yes	—N/a	Natsume Co., Ltd.	Imagineer	July 23, 1999 (JP)	Yes	No	No
Medarot 2: Parts Collection	Yes	—N/a		Imagineer	October 29, 1999 (JP)	Yes	No	No
Medarot 3: Kabuto Version	No	—N/a	Natsume Co., Ltd.	Imagineer	July 23, 2000 (JP)	Yes	No	No
Medarot 3: Kuwagata Version	No	—N/a	Natsume Co., Ltd.	Imagineer	July 23, 2000 (JP)	Yes	No	No
Medarot 3: Parts Collection	No	—N/a	Natsume Co., Ltd.	Imagineer	November 24, 2000 (JP)	Yes	No	No
Medarot 4: Kabuto Version	No	—N/a	Natsume Co., Ltd.	Imagineer	March 23, 2001 (JP)	Yes	No	No
Medarot 4: Kuwagata Version	No	—N/a	Natsume Co., Ltd.	Imagineer	March 23, 2001 (JP)	Yes	No	No
Medarot 5 - Susutake Mura no Tenkousei: Kabuto Version	No	—N/a		Imagineer	December 14, 2001 (JP)	Yes	No	No
Medarot 5 - Susutake Mura no Tenkousei: Kuwagata Version	No	—N/a		Imagineer	December 14, 2001 (JP)	Yes	No	No
Medarot Card Robottle: Kabuto Version	Yes	—N/a	TOSE	Imagineer	March 10, 2000 (JP)	Yes	No	No
Medarot Card Robottle: Kuwagata Version	Yes	—N/a	TOSE	Imagineer	March 10, 2000 (JP)	Yes	No	No
Mega Man Xtreme •Rockman X: Cyber Mission^{JP}	Yes	—N/a	Capcom	Capcom	October 20, 2000 (JP); January 11, 2001 (NA); August 24, 2001 (EU)	Yes	Yes	Yes
Mega Man Xtreme 2 •Rockman X: Soul Eraser^{JP}	No	—N/a	Capcom	Capcom	June 19, 2001 (JP); October 30, 2001 (NA); February 8, 2002 (EU)	Yes	Yes	Yes
Megami Tensei Gaiden: Last Bible II	Yes	—N/a	Multimedia Intelligence Transfer	Atlus	April 16, 1999 (JP)	Yes	No	No
Meitantei Conan: Karakuri Jiin Satsujin Jiken	Yes	—N/a	Alpha Unit	Banpresto	February 24, 2000 (JP)	Yes	No	No
Meitantei Conan: Kigantou Hihou Densetsu	Yes	—N/a	Alpha Unit	Banpresto	March 31, 2000 (JP)	Yes	No	No
Meitantei Conan: Norowareta Kouro	Yes	—N/a	Alpha Unit	Banpresto	June 1, 2001 (JP)	Yes	No	No
Men in Black: The Series	Yes	—N/a	Tiertex	Crave Entertainment	December 1, 1998 (NA)	No	Yes	No
Men in Black 2: The Series	No	—N/a	David A. Palmer Productions	Crave Entertainment	July 9, 2000 (NA, EU)	No	Yes	Yes
Merlin	No	—N/a	RFX Interactive	Electronic Arts	February 2, 2001 (EU)	No	No	Yes
Metal Gear Solid^{NA} •Metal Gear: Ghost Babel^{JP}	No	—N/a	TOSE	Konami	April 27, 2000 (JP); April 24, 2000 (NA); May 1, 2000 (EU)	Yes	Yes	Yes
Metal Walker^{NA} •Bakusou Senki Metal Walker GB: Kotetsu no Yuujou^{JP}	Yes	—N/a	TOSE	Capcom	December 24, 1999 (JP); February 6, 2001 (NA)	Yes	Yes	No
Metamode	No	—N/a		Koei	February 24, 2000 (JP)	Yes	No	No
Mia Hamm Soccer Shootout^{NA} •Telefoot Soccer 2000^{EU} •European Super League^{EU}	No	—N/a	Aqua Pacific	SouthPeak Interactive^{NA} Ubi Soft^{EU}	October 27, 2000 (NA); March 1, 2001 (EU)	No	Yes	Yes
Mickey's Racing Adventure	No	—N/a	Rare	Nintendo	November 22, 1999 (NA); November 25, 1999 (EU)	No	Yes	Yes
Mickey's Speedway USA	No	—N/a	Rare	Nintendo	March 25, 2001 (NA); March 23, 2001 (EU)	No	Yes	Yes
Micro Machines 1 and 2: Twin Turbo	No	—N/a	Virtucraft	THQ	January 1, 2000 (NA, EU)	No	Yes	Yes
Micro Machines V3	No	—N/a	Novalicious	THQ	November 13, 2000 (NA); November 24, 2000 (EU)	No	Yes	Yes
Micro Maniacs	No	—N/a	Hyperion Studios	THQ	November 2, 2001 (EU)	No	No	Yes
Microsoft: The 6-in-1 Puzzle Collection Entertainment Pack	No	—N/a	Conspiracy Entertainment	Classified Games^{NA} Conspiracy Entertainment^{EU}	October 24, 2000 (NA, EU)	No	Yes	Yes
Microsoft: The Best of Entertainment Pack	No	—N/a	Saffire	Classified Games^{NA} Cryo Interactive^{EU}	June 1, 2001 (NA); August 31, 2001 (EU)	No	Yes	Yes
Microsoft Pinball Arcade	No	—N/a	Saffire	Classified Games^{NA} Cryo Interactive^{EU}	May 1, 2001 (NA, EU)	No	Yes	Yes
Midway Presents Arcade Hits: Joust / Defender	Yes	—N/a	Digital Eclipse	Midway	March 1, 1999 (NA); April 1, 1999 (EU)	No	Yes	Yes
Midway Presents Arcade Hits: Moon Patrol / Spy Hunter	Yes	—N/a	Digital Eclipse	Midway	May 1, 1999 (NA, EU)	No	Yes	Yes
Millennium Winter Sports •Hyper Olympic Winter 2000^{JP} •Konami Winter Games^{EU}	No	—N/a	Konami	Konami	January 27, 2000 (JP); April 1, 2000 (NA); 2000 (EU)	Yes	Yes	Yes
Minna no Shougi: Shokyuu Hen	Yes	—N/a		MTO	December 10, 1999 (JP)	Yes	No	No
Minnie & Friends: Yume no Kuni wo Sagashite	No	—N/a	Hudson Soft	Hudson Soft	December 13, 2001 (JP)	Yes	No	No
Missile Command	No	Rumble Pak	The Code Monkeys	Hasbro Interactive	September 1, 1999 (NA, EU)	No	Yes	Yes
Mission: Impossible	No	—N/a	Rebellion	Infogrames	February 22, 2000 (NA); August 1, 2000 (EU)	No	Yes	Yes
Mizuki Shigeru no Shin Youkaiden	No	—N/a		Prime System	July 27, 2001 (JP)	Yes	No	No
Mobile Golf	No	—N/a	Camelot Software Planning	Nintendo	May 11, 2001 (JP)	Yes	No	No
Momotarou Densetsu 1-2	No	—N/a	TamTam	Hudson Soft	January 1, 2001 (JP)	Yes	No	No
Monkey Puncher •Saru Puncher^{JP}	Yes	—N/a	Atelier Double	Event Evolution Entertainment^{EU} Taito^{JP}	March 24, 2000 (JP); December 1, 2000 (EU)	Yes	No	Yes
Monopoly	Yes	—N/a	Sculptured Software	Majesco^{NA} Hasbro Interactive^{JP}	December 11, 1998 (JP); May 1, 1999 (NA)	Yes	Yes	No
Monster Rancher Battle Card GB •Monster Farm Battle Card GB^{JP}	Yes	—N/a	Graphic Research	Tecmo	December 24, 1999 (JP); April 1, 2000 (NA)	Yes	Yes	No
Monster ★ Race 2	Yes	—N/a	Koei	Koei	March 12, 1999 (JP)	Yes	No	No
Monster Rancher Explorer •Solomon^{JP}	No	—N/a	Graphic Research	Tecmo	September 29, 2000 (JP); October 30, 2000 (NA)	Yes	Yes	No
Monsters, Inc.	No	—N/a	Vicarious Visions	THQ	October 19, 2001 (NA); February 1, 2002 (EU)	No	Yes	Yes
Monster Traveler	No	—N/a		Taito	March 8, 2002 (JP)	Yes	No	No
Montezuma's Return	Yes	—N/a	Tarantula Studios	Take 2 Interactive	December 1, 1998 (NA, EU)	No	Yes	Yes
Moomin's Tale •Mumin no Daibouken^{JP}	No	—N/a	Pixel (company)	Sunsoft	June 30, 2000 (JP); December 1, 2000 (EU)	Yes	No	Yes
Moorhuhn 2: Die Jagd Geht Weiter	No	—N/a	Similis (game developer)	Ravensburger Interactive Media	April 6, 2001 (DE)	No	No	Yes
Moorhuhn 3: ...Es Gibt Huhn!	No	—N/a	Similis (game developer)	Ubi Soft	July 11, 2002 (EU)	No	No	Yes
Mortal Kombat 4	Yes	—N/a	Digital Eclipse	Midway Games	December 1, 1998 (NA); April 1, 1999 (EU)	No	Yes	Yes
Motocross Maniacs 2 •Crazy Bikers^{EU}	No	—N/a	Konami	Konami	September 14, 1999 (NA); September 10, 1999 (EU)	No	Yes	Yes
Mr. Driller	No	—N/a	Namco	Namco^{NA/JP} Virgin Interactive^{EU}	June 29, 2000 (JP); August 2, 2000 (NA, EU)	Yes	Yes	Yes
Mr. Nutz	No	—N/a	Planet Interactive	Infogrames	December 1, 1999 (NA, EU)	No	Yes	Yes
Ms. Pac-Man: Special Color Edition •Ms. Pac-Man: Special Colour Edition^{EU}	Yes	—N/a	Namco	Namco^{NA} Acclaim Entertainment^{EU}	November 1, 1999 (NA); 1999 (EU)	No	Yes	Yes
MTV Sports: Pure Ride	No	—N/a	Visual Impact	THQ	December 6, 2000 (NA, EU)	No	Yes	Yes
MTV Sports: Skateboarding featuring Andy Macdonald	No	—N/a	Yellowbelly Corporation	THQ	August 28, 2000 (NA); December 17, 2000 (EU)	No	Yes	Yes
MTV Sports: T.J. Lavin's Ultimate BMX	No	—N/a	Handheld Games	THQ	December 15, 2000 (NA); December 8, 2000 (EU)	No	Yes	Yes
The Mummy •Hamunaptra: Ushinawareta Sabaku no Miyako^{JP}	No	—N/a	Konami	Konami	November 30, 2000 (JP); December 15, 2000 (NA, EU)	Yes	Yes	Yes
The Mummy Returns	No	—N/a	Game Brains	Universal Interactive	April 26, 2001 (NA); May 18, 2001 (EU)	No	Yes	Yes
Muteki Ou Tri-Zenon	No	—N/a		Marvelous Entertainment	March 9, 2001 (JP)	Yes	No	No
Nakayoshi Cooking Series 1: Oishii Cake Okusan	No	—N/a		MTO	December 15, 2000 (JP)	Yes	No	No
Nakayoshi Cooking Series 2: Oishii Panya-San	No	—N/a		MTO	April 20, 2001 (JP)	Yes	No	No
Nakayoshi Cooking Series 3: Tanoshii Obentou	No	—N/a		MTO	June 29, 2001 (JP)	Yes	No	No
Nakayoshi Cooking Series 4: Tanoshii Dessert	No	—N/a		MTO	November 16, 2001 (JP)	Yes	No	No
Nakayoshi Cooking Series 5: Komugi-Chan no Cake o Tsukurou!	No	—N/a		MTO	April 5, 2002 (JP)	Yes	No	No
Nakayoshi Pet Series 1: Kawaii Hamster	Yes	—N/a		MTO	January 28, 2000 (JP)	Yes	No	No
Nakayoshi Pet Series 2: Kawaii Usagi	Yes	—N/a		MTO	March 24, 2000 (JP)	Yes	No	No
Nakayoshi Pet Series 3: Kawaii Koinu	No	—N/a		MTO	August 11, 2000 (JP)	Yes	No	No
Nakayoshi Pet Series 4: Kawaii Koneko	No	—N/a		MTO	February 16, 2001 (JP)	Yes	No	No
Nakayoshi Pet Series 5: Kawaii Hamster 2	No	—N/a		MTO	April 27, 2001 (JP)	Yes	No	No
NASCAR 2000	No	—N/a	Software Creations	EA Sports	July 1, 2000 (NA)	No	Yes	No
NASCAR Challenge	No	Rumble Pak	Morning Star Multimedia	Hasbro Interactive	November 15, 1999 (NA)	No	Yes	No
NASCAR Heat	No	—N/a	Game Titan	Hasbro Interactive	December 1, 2000 (NA)	No	Yes	No
NASCAR Racers	No	—N/a	Digital Eclipse	Hasbro Interactive	December 1, 2000 (NA)	No	Yes	No
The Nations: Land of Legends	No	—N/a	Neon Software	JoWooD Productions	February 8, 2002 (EU)	No	No	Yes
NBA 3 on 3 featuring Kobe Bryant	Yes	—N/a	Left Field Productions	Nintendo	December 7, 1999 (NA)	No	Yes	No
NBA Hoopz	No	—N/a	Torus Games	Midway	February 25, 2001 (NA)	No	Yes	No
NBA in the Zone •NBA Pro '99^{EU}	Yes	—N/a	Konami	Konami	May 1, 1999 (NA); June 1, 1999 (EU)	No	Yes	Yes
NBA in the Zone 2000	No	—N/a	Konami	Konami	April 27, 2000 (NA); September 29, 2000 (EU)	No	Yes	Yes
NBA Jam '99	Yes	—N/a	Torus Games	Acclaim Sports	April 1, 1999 (NA); 1998 (EU)	No	Yes	Yes
NBA Jam 2001	No	—N/a	dc Studios	Acclaim Sports	December 1, 2000 (NA, EU)	No	Yes	Yes
NBA Showtime: NBA on NBC	No	—N/a	Torus Games	Midway Games	January 1, 2000 (NA)	No	Yes	No
Net de Get: Mini-Game @ 100	No	—N/a	Konami	Konami	July 12, 2001 (JP)	Yes	No	No
Network Boukenki Bug Site: Alpha Version	No	—N/a	KAZe	Smile Soft	November 2, 2001 (JP)	Yes	No	No
Network Boukenki Bug Site: Beta Version	No	—N/a	KAZe	Smile Soft	November 2, 2001 (JP)	Yes	No	No
The New Addams Family Series	No	—N/a	7th Sense	Microids	February 8, 2002 (EU)	No	No	Yes
The New Adventures of Mary-Kate & Ashley	Yes	—N/a	Crawfish Interactive	Club Acclaim	December 1, 1999 (NA); November 16, 2001 (EU)	No	Yes	Yes
NFL Blitz	Yes	—N/a	Digital Eclipse	Midway Games	December 1, 1998 (NA, EU)	No	Yes	Yes
NFL Blitz 2000	No	—N/a	Digital Eclipse	Midway Games	December 8, 1999 (NA)	No	Yes	No
NFL Blitz 2001	No	—N/a	Morning Star Multimedia	Midway Games	September 12, 2000 (NA)	No	Yes	No
NHL 2000	Yes	—N/a	Tiertex	THQ^{NA} EA Sports^{EU}	August 1, 1999 (NA, EU)	No	Yes	Yes
NHL Blades of Steel	No	—N/a	Climax Studios	Konami	July 6, 1999 (NA)	No	Yes	No
NHL Blades of Steel 2000	No	—N/a	Climax Studios	Konami	April 21, 2000 (NA)	No	Yes	No
Nicktoons Racing	No	—N/a	Pipe Dream Interactive	Hasbro Interactive	December 7, 2000 (NA)	No	Yes	No
Nintama Rantarou: Ninjutsu Gakuen ni Nyuugakushou no Dan	No	—N/a	Polygon Magic	ASK	March 23, 2001 (JP)	Yes	No	No
Nisemon: Puzzle da Mon! - Feromon Kyuushutsu Daisakusen!	No	—N/a	Prime System	Prime System	August 10, 2001 (JP)	Yes	No	No
Nobunaga's Ambition II	Yes	—N/a	Koei	Koei	April 9, 1999 (JP)	Yes	No	No
No Fear Downhill Mountain Biking	No	—N/a	Spellbound Entertainment	THQ	November 2, 2001 (EU)	No	No	Yes
Noddy and the Birthday Party	No	—N/a	Tiertex Design Studios	BBC Multimedia	December 31, 2000 (EU)	No	No	Yes
NSYNC: Get to the Show	No	—N/a	Stunt Puppy Entertainment	Infogrames	December 12, 2001 (NA)	No	Yes	No
Nushi Tsuri Adventure: Kite no Bouken	No	—N/a	TOSE	Victor Interactive Software	August 4, 2000 (JP)	Yes	No	No
NYR: New York Race	No	—N/a	Kalisto	Wanadoo Edition	November 16, 2001 (EU)	No	No	Yes
Oddworld Adventures 2	Yes	—N/a	Saffire	GT Interactive^{NA} Infogrames^{EU}	January 1, 2000 (NA); June 1, 2000 (EU)	No	Yes	Yes
Ohasuta Dance Dance Revolution GB	No	—N/a	Now Production	Konami	February 8, 2001 (JP)	Yes	No	No
Ohasuta Yama-chan & Raymond	Yes	—N/a	Epoch	Epoch	March 12, 1999 (JP)	Yes	No	No
Oide Rascal	No	—N/a	Agatsuma Entertainment	Tamsoft	April 25, 2001 (JP)	Yes	No	No
Ojarumaru: Mitsunegai Jinja no Ennichi de Ojaru!	Yes	—N/a		MTO	June 30, 2000 (JP)	Yes	No	No
Ojarumaru: Tsukiyo ga Ike no Takaramono	Yes	—N/a		Success	July 14, 2000 (JP)	Yes	No	No
O'Leary Manager 2000	No	—N/a	Live Media	Ubi Soft	September 15, 2000 (EU)	No	No	Yes
Othello Millennium	Yes	—N/a	Tomcat System	Tsukuda Original	October 8, 1999 (JP)	Yes	No	No
Ottifanten: Kommando Stoertebeker	No	—N/a	Kritzelkratz	JoWooD Entertainment AG	January 1, 2001 (EU)	No	No	Yes
Ou Dorobou Jing: Angel Version	Yes	—N/a	C.P. Brain	Nippon Computer Systems Corp.	March 12, 1999 (JP)	Yes	No	No
Ou Dorobou Jing: Devil Version	Yes	—N/a	C.P. Brain	Nippon Computer Systems Corp.	March 12, 1999 (JP)	Yes	No	No
Owarai Yowiko no Game-dou: Oyaji Sagashite Sanchoume	Yes	—N/a	KCEK	Konami	December 25, 1999 (JP)	Yes	No	No
Pac-Man: Special Color Edition •Pac-Man: Special Colour Edition^{EU}	Yes	—N/a	Namco	Namco^{NA} Acclaim Entertainment^{EU}	August 1, 1999 (NA, EU)	No	Yes	Yes
Pachinko CR Mouretsu Genjin T	Yes	—N/a		Hect	June 4, 1999 (JP)	Yes	No	No
Pachinko Hisshou Guide: Data no Ou-sama	Yes	—N/a		BOSS Communication	December 22, 1999 (JP)	Yes	No	No
Pachi Pachi Pachi-Slot: New Pulsar Hen	Yes	—N/a		Starfish	April 28, 1999 (JP)	Yes	No	No
Paperboy	No	—N/a	Digital Eclipse	Midway Games	March 1, 1999 (NA, EU)	No	Yes	Yes
Papyrus	No	—N/a	Planet Interactive	Ubi Soft	February 1, 2000 (EU)	No	No	Yes
Perfect Choro Q	No	—N/a	Electronics Application	Takara	August 11, 2000 (JP)	Yes	No	No
Perfect Dark	No	Rumble Pak	Rare	Rare	August 28, 2000 (NA); August 1, 2000 (EU)	No	Yes	Yes
Pia Carrot e Youkoso!! 2.2	No	—N/a	TOSE	NEC Interchannel	December 2, 2000 (JP)	Yes	No	No
Pitfall: Beyond the Jungle^{NA/EU} •Pitfall GB^{JP}	Yes	—N/a	David A. Palmer Productions	Crave Entertainment^{NA} Interplay Entertainment^{EU} Pony Canyon^{JP}	December 1, 1998 (NA); May 28, 1999 (JP, EU)	Yes	Yes	Yes
Planet of the Apes	No	—N/a	Torus Games	Ubi Soft	December 6, 2001 (NA); November 23, 2001 (EU)	No	Yes	Yes
Player Manager 2001 •Anpfiff: Der RTL Fussball-Manager^{DE}	No	—N/a	G3 Interactive	THQ	September 21, 2001 (EU)	No	No	Yes
Pocket Billiard: Funk The 9 Ball	No	—N/a	Sun-Tec	Tamsoft	February 19, 2000 (JP)	Yes	No	No
Pocket Bomberman	Yes	—N/a	Hudson Soft	Nintendo	November 18, 1998 (NA); January 1, 1999 (EU)	No	Yes	Yes
Pocket Bowling	Yes	—N/a	Athena	Jaleco^{NA} Athena^{JP}	October 23, 1998 (JP); August 15, 1999 (NA)	Yes	Yes	No
Pocket Cooking	No	—N/a		J-Wing	August 24, 2001 (JP)	Yes	No	No
Pocket Color Billiard	No	—N/a		Bottom Up	December 24, 1999 (JP)	Yes	No	No
Pocket Color Mahjong	Yes	—N/a		Bottom Up	December 22, 1999 (JP)	Yes	No	No
Pocket Color Trump	Yes	—N/a		Bottom Up	December 22, 1999 (JP)	Yes	No	No
Pocket Densha 2	Yes	—N/a	Coconuts Japan	Coconuts Japan	April 2, 1999 (JP)	Yes	No	No
Pocket Family GB2	No	—N/a	Hudson Soft	Hudson Soft	August 6, 1999 (JP)	Yes	No	No
Pocket GI Stable	Yes	—N/a	KCEN	Konami	April 28, 1999 (JP)	Yes	No	No
Pocket Hanafuda	No	—N/a		Bottom Up	June 11, 1999 (JP)	Yes	No	No
Pocket King	Yes	—N/a		Namco	February 23, 2001 (JP)	Yes	No	No
Pocket Lure Boy	No	—N/a	Kaga Tech	King Records	July 23, 1999 (JP)	Yes	No	No
Pocket Music	No	—N/a	Jester Interactive	Rage Software	February 22, 2002 (EU)	No	No	Yes
Pocket Pro Wrestling: Perfect Wrestler	No	—N/a	Dream Japan	J-Wing	March 17, 2000 (JP)	Yes	No	No
Pocket Pro Yakyuu	No	—N/a	Pixel	Epoch	March 10, 2000 (JP)	Yes	No	No
Pocket Puyo Puyo SUN	Yes	—N/a	Compile	Compile	November 27, 1998 (JP)	Yes	No	No
Pocket Puyo Puyo~n	No	—N/a	Compile	Compile	September 22, 2000 (JP)	Yes	No	No
Pocket Racing •Pocket GT^{JP}	No	—N/a	MTO	Virgin Interactive	October 15, 1999 (JP); 2000 (EU)	Yes	No	Yes
Pocket Soccer	No	—N/a	Game-Play Studios	Nintendo	March 16, 2001 (EU)	No	No	Yes
Pokémon Card GB2: Great Rocket-Dan Sanjō!	No	—N/a	Hudson Soft; Creatures Inc.	The Pokémon Company	March 28, 2001 (JP)	Yes	No	No
Pokémon Crystal Version	No	Real-time clock	Game Freak	Nintendo	December 14, 2000 (JP); July 29, 2001 (NA); November 2, 2001 (EU)	Yes	Yes	Yes
Pokémon Gold Version	Yes	Real-time clock	Game Freak	Nintendo	November 21, 1999 (JP); October 14, 2000 (NA); April 6, 2001 (EU)	Yes	Yes	Yes
Pokémon Pinball	Yes	Rumble Pak	HAL Laboratory; Jupiter Corporation	Nintendo	April 14, 1999 (JP); June 28, 1999 (NA); October 6, 2000 (EU)	Yes	Yes	Yes
Pokémon Puzzle Challenge •Pokémon de Panepon^{JP}	No	—N/a	Intelligent Systems	Nintendo	September 21, 2000 (JP); September 1, 2000 (NA); June 8, 2001 (EU)	Yes	Yes	Yes
Pokémon Silver Version	Yes	Real-time clock	Game Freak	Nintendo	November 21, 1999 (JP); October 14, 2000 (NA); April 6, 2001 (EU)	Yes	Yes	Yes
Pokémon Trading Card Game •Pokémon Card GB^{JP}	Yes	—N/a	Hudson Soft; Creatures Inc.	Nintendo	December 18, 1998 (JP); April 10, 2000 (NA); December 8, 2000 (EU)	Yes	Yes	Yes
Polaris SnoCross •SnowCross^{EU}	No	Rumble Pak	Vicarious Visions	Vatical Entertainment^{NA} Wanadoo^{EU}	February 1, 2000 (NA); November 16, 2001 (EU)	No	Yes	Yes
Pong: The Next Level	No	—N/a	Morning Star Multimedia	Hasbro Interactive	December 1, 1999 (NA); 2000 (EU)	No	Yes	Yes
Pooh and Tigger's Hunny Safari	No	—N/a	Digital Eclipse	Electronic Arts^{NA} Ubi Soft^{EU}	December 1, 2001 (NA); February 1, 2002 (EU)	No	Yes	Yes
Pop'n Music GB	No	—N/a	Konami	Konami	March 30, 2000 (JP)	Yes	No	No
Pop'n Music GB: Animation Melody	No	—N/a	Konami	Konami	September 7, 2000 (JP)	Yes	No	No
Pop'n Music GB: Disney Tunes	No	—N/a	Konami	Konami	November 22, 2000 (JP)	Yes	No	No
Portal Runner	No	—N/a	Handheld Games	The 3DO Company	September 1, 2001 (NA)	No	Yes	No
Power Pro Kun Pocket	Yes	—N/a	Diamond Head	Konami	April 1, 1999 (JP)	Yes	No	No
Power Pro Kun Pocket 2	Yes	—N/a	Diamond Head	Konami	March 30, 2000 (JP)	Yes	No	No
The Powerpuff Girls: Bad Mojo Jojo	No	—N/a	Sennari Interactive	Bam! Entertainment	November 14, 2000 (NA, EU)	No	Yes	Yes
The Powerpuff Girls: Battle Him	No	—N/a	Sennari Interactive	Bam! Entertainment	February 27, 2001 (NA); July 20, 2001 (EU)	No	Yes	Yes
The Powerpuff Girls: Paint the Townsville Green	No	—N/a	Sennari Interactive	Bam! Entertainment	November 14, 2000 (NA, EU)	No	Yes	Yes
Power Quest	Yes	—N/a	Japan System Supply	Sunsoft	December 1, 1998 (NA); July 20, 1999 (EU)	No	Yes	Yes
Power Rangers: Lightspeed Rescue	No	—N/a	Natsume Co., Ltd.	THQ	June 1, 2000 (NA); November 24, 2000 (EU)	No	Yes	Yes
Power Rangers: Time Force	No	—N/a	Natsume Co., Ltd.	THQ	April 15, 2001 (NA); November 23, 2001 (EU)	No	Yes	Yes
Power Spike Pro Beach Volleyball^{NA} •Beach 'n Ball^{EU}	No	—N/a	Spark Creative	Infogrames	December 22, 2000 (NA); May 15, 2001 (EU)	No	Yes	Yes
Poyon no Dungeon Room: Daikaiju Monogatari	Yes	—N/a	Birthday	Hudson Soft	February 26, 1999 (JP)	Yes	No	No
Poyon no Dungeon Room 2	No	—N/a	Birthday	Hudson Soft	June 2, 2000 (JP)	Yes	No	No
Prince Naseem Boxing	No	—N/a	Virtucraft	THQ	August 3, 2001 (EU)	No	No	Yes
Prince of Persia	Yes	—N/a	Ed Magnin and Associates	Red Orb Entertainment	July 20, 1999 (NA, EU)	No	Yes	Yes
Pro Darts	No	—N/a	Vicarious Visions	Vatical Entertainment	February 7, 2002 (NA)	No	Yes	No
Professional Mahjong Goku GB II	Yes	—N/a		Athena	March 19, 1999 (JP)	Yes	No	No
Pro Mahjong Tsuwamono GB	Yes	—N/a		Culture Brain	July 9, 1999 (JP)	Yes	No	No
Pro Mahjong Tsuwamono GB2	No	—N/a		Culture Brain	February 24, 2000 (JP)	Yes	No	No
Pro Pool	No	—N/a	Blade Interactive	Codemasters	September 12, 2000 (NA, EU)	No	Yes	Yes
Project S-11	No	—N/a	Paragon 5	Sunsoft	December 11, 2000 (NA)	No	Yes	No
Puchi Carat	Yes	—N/a	ITL	Event Evolution Entertainment^{EU} Taito^{JP}	April 23, 1999 (JP); December 8, 2000 (EU)	Yes	No	Yes
Pumuckl's Abenteuer bei den Piraten	No	—N/a	NEON Software GmbH	Acclaim Entertainment	May 12, 1999 (DE)	No	No	Yes
Pumuckl's Abenteuer im Geisterschloss	No	—N/a	NEON Studios	Acclaim Entertainment	November 15, 2000 (DE)	No	No	Yes
Puyo Puyo Gaiden: Puyo Wars	Yes	—N/a	Compile	Compile	August 27, 1999 (JP)	Yes	No	No
Puzzle de Shoubuyo! Wootama-chan	Yes	—N/a	Kouyousha	Naxat Soft	September 28, 2000 (JP)	Yes	No	No
Puzzle Master	Yes	—N/a	Metro3D	Metro3D	December 1, 1999 (NA)	No	Yes	No
Puzzled	No	—N/a	Elo Interactive	Conspiracy Entertainment^{NA} Swing! Entertainment AG^{EU}	March 9, 2001 (NA, EU)	No	Yes	Yes
Q*bert	No	—N/a	Pipe Dream Interactive	Hasbro Interactive	September 25, 2000 (NA)	No	Yes	No
Qix Adventure	No	—N/a	Taito	Event Evolution Entertainment^{EU} Taito^{JP}	October 22, 1999 (JP); December 15, 2000 (EU)	Yes	No	Yes
Quest: Brian's Journey^{NA} •Elemental Tale - Jack no Daibouken: Daimaou no Gyakushuu^{JP}	Yes	—N/a	Atelier Double	Sunsoft^{NA} Imagineer^{JP}	January 15, 2000 (JP); January 23, 2000 (NA)	Yes	Yes	No
Quest: Fantasy Challenge^{NA} •Holy Magic Century^{EU}	Yes	—N/a	Imagineer	Sunsoft^{NA} Virgin Games^{EU}	April 1, 1999 (NA, EU)	No	Yes	Yes
Quest for Camelot	Yes	—N/a	Titus Intertactive	Titus Interactive; Nintendo	December 1, 1998 (NA); 1999 (EU)	No	Yes	Yes
Qui Qui	Yes	—N/a	Magical Company (Mahou)	Magical Company (Mahou)	March 26, 1999 (JP)	Yes	No	No
R-Type DX	Yes	—N/a	Bits Studios	Nintendo^{NA/EU} Epoch^{JP}	June 1, 1999 (NA); July 20, 1999 (EU); November 22, 1999 (JP)	Yes	Yes	Yes
Rainbow Six	No	—N/a	Crawfish Interactive	Red Storm Entertainment	April 3, 2000 (NA, EU)	No	Yes	Yes
Rainbow Islands	No	—N/a	Taito	TDK Mediactive	January 1, 2001 (EU)	No	No	Yes
Rampage: World Tour	Yes	—N/a	Digital Eclipse	Midway	December 1, 1998 (NA, EU)	No	Yes	Yes
Rampage 2: Universal Tour	No	—N/a	Digital Eclipse	Midway	November 1, 1999 (NA, EU)	No	Yes	Yes
Rampart	No	—N/a	Digital Eclipse	Midway	November 17, 1999 (NA)	No	Yes	No
Rats!^{NA} •Reservoir Rat^{EU}	Yes	—N/a	Tarantula Studios	Take 2 Interactive	December 1, 1998 (NA); 1999 (EU)	No	Yes	Yes
Rayman •Rayman: Mister Dark no Wana^{JP}	No	—N/a	Digital Eclipse	Ubi Soft	March 24, 2000 (JP); March 29, 2000 (NA); July 24, 2000 (EU)	Yes	Yes	Yes
Rayman 2: The Great Escape •Rayman 2 Forever^{EU}	No	—N/a	Ubi Soft Milan	Ubi Soft	January 1, 2002 (NA); December 14, 2001 (EU)	No	Yes	Yes
Razor Freestyle Scooter •Freestyle Scooter^{EU}	No	—N/a	Crawfish Interactive	Crave Entertainment	June 12, 2001 (NA); June 15, 2001 (EU)	No	Yes	Yes
Ready 2 Rumble Boxing	No	Rumble Pak	Crawfish Interactive	Midway	December 1, 1999 (NA, EU)	No	Yes	Yes
Real Pro Yakyuu!: Central League Hen	Yes	—N/a	Natsume Co., Ltd.	Natsume Co., Ltd.	April 23, 1999 (JP)	Yes	No	No
Real Pro Yakyuu!: Pacific League Hen	Yes	—N/a	Natsume Co., Ltd.	Natsume Co., Ltd.	April 23, 1999 (JP)	Yes	No	No
Resident Evil Gaiden •BioHazard Gaiden^{JP}	No	—N/a	Capcom; M4 Ltd.	Capcom^{NA/JP} Virgin Interactive^{EU}	March 29, 2002 (JP); June 3, 2002 (NA); December 14, 2001 (EU)	Yes	Yes	Yes
Return of the Ninja	No	—N/a	Act Japan	Natsume Inc.^{NA} Ubi Soft^{EU}	March 30, 2001 (EU); June 1, 2001 (NA)	No	Yes	Yes
Revelations: The Demon Slayer •Megami Tensei Gaiden: Last Bible^{JP}	Yes	—N/a	Multimedia Intelligence Transfer	Atlus	March 19, 1999 (JP); August 1, 1999 (NA)	Yes	Yes	No
Rhino Rumble	No	—N/a	Formula	Telegames	March 29, 2002 (NA); 2000 (EU)	No	Yes	Yes
Rip-Tide Racer	Yes	—N/a	Cryo Interactive	Cryo Interactive	July 1, 2000 (EU)	No	No	Yes
Road Champs: BXS Stunt Biking	No	—N/a	HotGen	Activision	December 5, 2000 (NA); February 23, 2001 (EU)	No	Yes	Yes
Road Rash	No	—N/a	3d6 Games	Electronic Arts	November 29, 2000 (NA); December 15, 2000 (EU)	No	Yes	Yes
Roadsters Trophy •Roadsters '99^{EU}	Yes	—N/a	Titus Software	Titus Software	January 1, 2000 (NA)	No	Yes	No
Robin Hood	No	—N/a	Planet Interactive	Electronic Arts	March 30, 2001 (EU)	No	No	Yes
RoboCop	No	—N/a	Mirage Interactive	Titus Software	January 1, 2001 (EU)	No	No	Yes
Robot Ponkottsu: Comic BomBom Special Version	Yes	Infrared Receiver	Hudson Soft; Red Entertainment	Hudson Soft	December 24, 1999 (JP)	Yes	No	No
Robot Ponkottsu: Moon Version	Yes	Infrared Receiver	Hudson Soft; Red Entertainment	Hudson Soft	December 24, 1999 (JP)	Yes	No	No
Robot Ponkottsu: Star Version	Yes	Infrared Receiver	Hudson Soft; Red Entertainment	Hudson Soft	December 4, 1998 (JP)	Yes	No	No
Robopon: Sun Version •Robot Ponkottsu: Sun Version^{JP}	Yes	Infrared Receiver	Hudson Soft; Red Entertainment	Atlus^{NA} Hudson Soft^{JP}	December 4, 1998 (JP); December 14, 2000 (NA)	Yes	Yes	No
Robot Wars: Metal Mayhem	No	—N/a	Tiertex Design Studios	BBC Multimedia	December 7, 2000 (EU)	No	No	Yes
Rocket Power: Gettin' Air	No	—N/a	Tiertex	THQ	March 27, 2001 (NA); May 4, 2001 (EU)	No	Yes	Yes
Rocky Mountain Trophy Hunter	No	—N/a	Xantera	WizardWorks	September 6, 2000 (NA)	No	Yes	No
Rokumon Tengai Mon-Colle-Knight GB	No	—N/a		Kadokawa Shoten	December 1, 2000 (JP)	Yes	No	No
Roland Garros French Open	No	—N/a	Visual Impact	Cryo Interactive	June 9, 2000 (EU)	No	No	Yes
Ronaldo V-Soccer •Ronaldo V-Football^{EU} •UEFA 2000^{EU}	Yes	—N/a	Bit Managers	Infogrames	June 1, 2001 (NA, EU)	No	Yes	Yes
Roswell Conspiracies: Aliens, Myths & Legends	No	—N/a	Crawfish Interactive	Red Storm Entertainment	May 28, 2001 (NA, EU)	No	Yes	Yes
Rox	Yes	—N/a	Altron	Titus Software	March 5, 1999 (JP); 2000 (NA); March 9, 2001 (EU)	Yes	Yes	Yes
RPG Tsukuru GB	No	—N/a	Kuusou Kagaku	ASCII Entertainment	March 17, 2000 (JP)	Yes	No	No
Rugrats: Time Travelers	Yes	—N/a	Software Creations	THQ	November 1, 1999 (NA); April 1, 2000 (EU)	No	Yes	Yes
Rugrats: Totally Angelica	No	—N/a	Tiertex	THQ	May 5, 2000 (NA); September 8, 2000 (EU)	No	Yes	Yes
Rugrats in Paris: The Movie	No	—N/a	Software Creations	THQ	November 15, 2000 (NA); March 30, 2001 (EU)	No	Yes	Yes
The Rugrats Movie	Yes	—N/a	Software Creations	THQ	February 28, 1999 (NA); 1999 (EU)	No	Yes	Yes
Sabrina the Animated Series: Spooked!	No	—N/a	WayForward	Simon & Schuster Interactive	November 6, 2001 (NA); November 16, 2001 (EU)	No	Yes	Yes
Sabrina the Animated Series: Zapped!	No	—N/a	WayForward	Simon & Schuster Interactive	November 1, 2000 (NA); November 17, 2000 (EU)	No	Yes	Yes
Sakata Gorou Kudan no Renju Kyoushitsu	Yes	—N/a		Culture Brain	June 25, 1999 (JP)	Yes	No	No
Sakura Taisen GB: Geki Hana Kumi Nyuutai!	No	—N/a		Media Factory	July 28, 2000 (JP)	Yes	No	No
Sakura Taisen GB2: Thunder Volt Sakusen	No	—N/a		Sega	December 6, 2001 (JP)	Yes	No	No
Samurai Kid	No	—N/a	Biox	Koei	February 2, 2001 (JP)	Yes	No	No
San Francisco Rush 2049	No	—N/a	Handheld Games	Midway	September 7, 2000 (NA); December 1, 2000 (EU)	No	Yes	Yes
San Goku Shi: Game Boy Ban 2	Yes	—N/a		Koei	July 30, 1999 (JP)	Yes	No	No
Sanrio Timenet: Kako Hen	Yes	—N/a	TOSE	Imagineer	November 27, 1998 (JP)	Yes	No	No
Sanrio Timenet: Mirai Hen	Yes	—N/a	TOSE	Imagineer	November 27, 1998 (JP)	Yes	No	No
Santa Claus Junior	No	—N/a	Neon Studios	JoWooD Productions	November 30, 2001 (EU)	No	No	Yes
Scrabble	No	—N/a	Runecraft	Ubi Soft	November 30, 2001 (EU)	No	No	Yes
Scooby-Doo! Classic Creep Capers	No	—N/a	Software Creations	THQ	February 20, 2001 (NA); March 30, 2001 (EU)	No	Yes	Yes
SD Hiryuu no Ken EX	Yes	—N/a		Culture Brain	April 30, 1999 (JP)	Yes	No	No
Seipoi Densetsu	Yes	—N/a		Gaps	April 14, 2000 (JP)	Yes	No	No
Seme COM Dungeon: Drururuaga	Yes	—N/a	Kuusou Kagaku	Namco	December 15, 2000 (JP)	Yes	No	No
Senkai Ibonroku Juntei Taisen: TV Animation Senkaiden Houshin Engi Yori	Yes	—N/a		Banpresto	November 24, 2000 (JP)	Yes	No	No
Sesame Street: Elmo's 123s	Yes	—N/a	Bonsai Entertainment Corporation	NewKidCo^{NA} Ubi Soft^{EU}	March 1, 1999 (NA); April 6, 2001 (EU)	No	Yes	Yes
Sesame Street: Elmo's ABCs	Yes	—N/a	Bonsai Entertainment Corporation	NewKidCo^{NA} Ubi Soft^{EU}	March 1, 1999 (NA); April 6, 2001 (EU)	No	Yes	Yes
Sesame Street: The Adventures of Elmo in Grouchland	Yes	—N/a	Bonsai Entertainment Corporation	NewKidCo^{NA} Ubi Soft^{EU}	October 1, 1999 (NA); November 1, 2000 (EU)	No	Yes	Yes
Sesame Street Sports	No	—N/a	Bonsai Entertainment Corporation	NewKidCo^{NA} Ubi Soft^{EU}	November 15, 2001 (NA); December 13, 2001 (EU)	No	Yes	Yes
Sgt. Rock: On the Frontline •Front Line: The Next Mission^{JP}	No	—N/a	Altron	Bam! Entertainment	December 17, 2000 (NA); February 23, 2001 (JP)	Yes	Yes	No
Shadowgate Classic •Shadowgate Returns^{JP}	Yes	—N/a	Infinite Ventures	Nintendo^{NA/EU} Kemco^{JP}	August 13, 1999 (JP); January 1, 1999 (NA); 1999 (EU)	Yes	Yes	Yes
Shaman King Chou Senjiryakketsu: Funbari Hen	No	—N/a	Studio Saizensen	King Records	December 21, 2001 (JP)	Yes	No	No
Shaman King Chou Senjiryakketsu: Meramera Hen	No	—N/a	Studio Saizensen	King Records	December 21, 2001 (JP)	Yes	No	No
Shamus	Yes	—N/a	Junglevision Software	Vatical Entertainment^{NA} Telegames^{EU}	March 1, 2000 (NA); October 1, 2000 (EU)	No	Yes	Yes
Shanghai Pocket	Yes	—N/a	Sunsoft	Sunsoft	December 1, 1998 (NA, EU)	No	Yes	Yes
Shantae	No	GBA Special Features	WayForward	Capcom	June 2, 2002 (NA)	No	Yes	No
Shaun Palmer's Pro Snowboarder	No	—N/a	ITL	Activision	November 1, 2001 (NA)	No	Yes	No
Shin Megami Tensei Devil Children: Aka no Shou	Yes	—N/a	Multimedia Intelligence Transfer	Atlus	November 17, 2000 (JP)	Yes	No	No
Shin Megami Tensei Devil Children: Kuro no Shou	Yes	—N/a	Multimedia Intelligence Transfer	Atlus	November 17, 2000 (JP)	Yes	No	No
Shin Megami Tensei Devil Children: Shiro no Shou	No	—N/a	Multimedia Intelligence Transfer	Atlus	July 27, 2001 (JP)	Yes	No	No
Shin Megami Tensei Trading Card: Card Summoner	No	—N/a		Enterbrain	July 27, 2001 (JP)	Yes	No	No
Shin Seiki Evangelion: Mahjong Hokan Keikaku	No	—N/a	Studio Saizensen	King Records	September 29, 2000 (JP)	Yes	No	No
Shogi 2	Yes	—N/a		Pony Canyon	March 19, 1999 (JP)	Yes	No	No
Shogi 3	Yes	—N/a		Pony Canyon	December 24, 2001 (JP)	Yes	No	No
Shoubushi Densetsu Tetsuya: Shinjuku Tenun-hen	No	—N/a		Athena	February 9, 2001 (JP)	Yes	No	No
Shrek: Fairy Tale Freakdown	No	—N/a	Prolific	TDK Mediactive	May 29, 2001 (NA, EU)	No	Yes	Yes
The Shutokou Racing	Yes	—N/a	Opera House	Pony Canyon	December 18, 1998 (JP)	Yes	No	No
The Simpsons: Night of the Living Treehouse of Horror	No	—N/a	Software Creations	THQ	March 26, 2001 (NA); April 20, 2001 (EU)	No	Yes	Yes
The Smurfs' Nightmare^{NA} •Die Schlumpfe: Im Alptraumland^{EU}	No	—N/a	Bit Managers	Infogrames	February 28, 1999 (NA); January 1, 2000 (EU)	No	Yes	Yes
Snoopy Tennis	No	—N/a	Mermaid Studios	Infogrames	June 20, 2001 (JP); April 6, 2001 (NA); October 26, 2001 (EU)	Yes	Yes	Yes
Snowboard Champion	No	—N/a	Dream Japan	Bottom Up	March 31, 2000 (JP)	Yes	No	No
Snow White and the Seven Dwarfs	No	—N/a	Planet Interactive	Ubi Soft	June 15, 2001 (NA); June 16, 2001 (EU)	No	Yes	Yes
Soccer Manager	No	—N/a	Broadsword Interactive	Acclaim Entertainment	July 7, 2000 (EU)	No	No	Yes
Soukoban Densetsu: Hikari to Yami no Kuni	Yes	—N/a		J-Wing	December 25, 1999 (JP)	Yes	No	No
Soreike! Anpanman: 5tsu no Tou no Ousama	No	—N/a	Graphic Research	Tamsoft	November 23, 2000 (JP)	Yes	No	No
Soreike! Anpanman: Fushigi na Nikoniko Album	Yes	—N/a	Graphic Research	Tamsoft	December 3, 1999 (JP)	Yes	No	No
Soul Getter: Houkago Bouken RPG	Yes	—N/a		Micro Cabin	August 4, 2000 (JP)	Yes	No	No
Space Invaders •Space Invaders X^{JP}	Yes	—N/a	Crawfish Interactive	Activision^{NA/EU} Taito^{JP}	September 29, 2000 (JP); October 27, 1999 (NA, EU)	Yes	Yes	Yes
Space Marauder •Burai Fighter Color^{JP}	No	—N/a	KID	Agetec^{NA} KID^{JP}	July 23, 1999 (JP); August 28, 2000 (NA)	Yes	Yes	No
Space-Net: Cosmo Blue	No	—N/a		Imagineer	March 16, 2001 (JP)	Yes	No	No
Space-Net: Cosmo Red	No	—N/a		Imagineer	March 16, 2001 (JP)	Yes	No	No
Space Station Silicon Valley	Yes	—N/a	Tarantula Studios	Take-Two Interactive	July 1, 1999 (EU)	No	No	Yes
Spawn	No	—N/a	Konami	Konami	September 15, 1999 (NA)	No	Yes	No
Speedy Gonzales: Aztec Adventure	Yes	—N/a	Sunsoft	Sunsoft	December 26, 1999 (NA); February 1, 2000 (EU)	No	Yes	Yes
Spider-Man	No	—N/a	Vicarious Visions	Activision^{NA/EU} Success^{JP}	April 27, 2001 (JP); August 1, 2000 (NA); September 15, 2000 (EU)	Yes	Yes	Yes
Spider-Man 2: The Sinister Six •Spider-Man 2: Enter the Sinister Six^{EU}	No	—N/a	Torus Games	Activision	May 30, 2001 (NA); June 15, 2001 (EU)	No	Yes	Yes
Spirou: The Robot Invasion	No	—N/a	Planet Interactive	Ubi Soft	January 1, 2000 (EU)	No	No	Yes
SpongeBob SquarePants: Legend of the Lost Spatula	No	—N/a	Vicarious Visions	THQ	March 14, 2001 (NA); May 4, 2001 (EU)	No	Yes	Yes
Spy vs. Spy	No	—N/a	Kemco	Vatical Entertainment^{NA} Kemco^{EU/JP}	July 23, 1999 (JP); June 1, 1999 (NA, EU)	Yes	Yes	Yes
Star Ocean: Blue Sphere	Yes	—N/a	tri-Ace	Enix	June 28, 2001 (JP)	Yes	No	No
Star Wars: Yoda Stories	Yes	—N/a	Torus Games	THQ	December 1, 1999 (NA, EU)	No	Yes	Yes
Star Wars Episode I: Obi-Wan's Adventures	No	—N/a	HotGen	THQ	November 27, 2000 (NA); December 8, 2000 (EU)	No	Yes	Yes
Star Wars Episode I: Racer	No	Rumble Pak	Pax Softonica	Nintendo	December 6, 1999 (NA, EU)	No	Yes	Yes
Street Fighter Alpha: Warriors' Dreams	No	—N/a	Crawfish Interactive	Capcom^{NA/JP} Virgin Interactive^{EU}	December 17, 1999 (EU); March 24, 2000 (NA); March 30, 2001 (JP)	Yes	Yes	Yes
Stuart Little: The Journey Home	No	—N/a	Tiertex	Activision	August 24, 2001 (NA); September 7, 2001 (EU)	No	Yes	Yes
Super Black Bass: Real Fight	No	Rumble Pak	HOT B	Starfish	December 10, 1999 (JP)	Yes	No	No
Super Bombliss DX	Yes	—N/a	TOSE	Bullet Proof Software	December 10, 1999 (JP)	Yes	No	No
Super Breakout	Yes	—N/a	Morning Star Multimedia	Majesco	December 1, 1998 (NA); 1999 (EU)	No	Yes	Yes
Super Chinese Fighter EX	No	—N/a		Culture Brain	December 24, 1999 (JP)	Yes	No	No
Super Doll Licca-chan: Kisekae Daisakusen	No	—N/a		Vial One	October 6, 2000 (JP)	Yes	No	No
Super Me-Mail GB: Me-Mail Bear no Happy Mail Town	No	—N/a		Konami	December 1, 2000 (JP)	Yes	No	No
Super Mario Bros. Deluxe	No	—N/a	Nintendo R&D2	Nintendo	May 10, 1999 (NA); July 1, 1999 (EU); March 1, 2000 (JP)	Yes	Yes	Yes
Super Real Fishing	No	Rumble Pak	Bottom Up	Bottom Up	October 8, 1999 (JP)	Yes	No	No
Super Robot Pinball	No	—N/a		Media Factory	February 23, 2001 (JP)	Yes	No	No
Super Robot Wars: Link Battler	Yes	—N/a	Amble	Banpresto	October 1, 1999 (JP)	Yes	No	No
Supercross Freestyle	No	—N/a	Velez & Dubail	Infogrames	January 1, 2000 (EU)	No	No	Yes
Survival Kids •Stranded Kids^{EU} •Survival Kids: Kotou no Boukensha^{JP}	Yes	—N/a	Konami	Konami	June 17, 1999 (JP); October 1, 1999 (NA); December 10, 1999 (EU)	Yes	Yes	Yes
Survival Kids 2: Dasshutsu!! Futago-jima	Yes	—N/a	Konami	Konami	July 19, 2000 (JP)	Yes	No	No
Suzuki Alstare Extreme Racing	No	—N/a	Visual Impact	Ubi Soft	January 1, 1999 (EU)	No	No	Yes
Sweet Ange	Yes	—N/a	Koei	Koei	December 17, 1999 (JP)	Yes	No	No
Swing	No	—N/a	Software 2000	Software 2000	October 20, 2000 (DE)	No	No	Yes
SWIV	No	—N/a	The Conversion Company	Sales Curve Interactive	March 16, 2001 (EU)	No	No	Yes
Sylvanian Families: Otogi no Kuni no Pendant	Yes	—N/a		Epoch	October 15, 1999 (JP)	Yes	No	No
Sylvanian Families 2: Irozuku Mori no Fantasy	No	—N/a		Epoch	December 22, 2000 (JP)	Yes	No	No
Sylvanian Families 3: Hoshi Furu Yoru no Sunadokei	No	—N/a		Epoch	December 21, 2001 (JP)	Yes	No	No
Sylvanian Melody: Mori no Nakama to Odori Mashi!	Yes	—N/a	Natsume Co., Ltd.	Epoch	March 17, 2000 (JP)	Yes	No	No
Tabaluga	Yes	—N/a	NEON Software GmbH	Infogrames	May 3, 1999 (DE)	No	No	Yes
Taisen Tsume Shougi	No	—N/a	Athena	Athena	July 1, 2000 (JP)	Yes	No	No
Tales of Phantasia: Narikiri Dungeon	Yes	—N/a	Alfa System	Namco	November 10, 2000 (JP)	Yes	No	No
Tanimura Hitoshi Ryuu Pachinko Kouryaku Daisakusen: Don Quijote ga Iku	Yes	—N/a		Atlus	August 11, 2000 (JP)	Yes	No	No
Tarzan	No	—N/a	Digital Eclipse	Activision^{NA/EU} Syscom^{JP}	June 24, 1999 (NA, EU); March 24, 2000 (JP)	Yes	Yes	Yes
Tasmanian Devil: Munching Madness	Yes	—N/a	M4 Limited	Sunsoft	November 1, 1999 (NA, EU)	No	Yes	Yes
Taxi 2	No	—N/a	Visual Impact	Ubi Soft	June 1, 2000 (FR)	No	No	Yes
Taxi 3	No	—N/a	Visual Impact	Ubi Soft	January 1, 2002 (EU)	No	No	Yes
Tech Deck Skateboarding	No	—N/a	Handheld Games	Activision	March 25, 2001 (NA); April 6, 2001 (EU)	No	Yes	Yes
Test Drive 6	Yes	—N/a	Xantera	Infogrames^{NA} Cryo Interactive^{EU}	November 16, 1999 (NA); July 1, 2000 (EU)	No	Yes	Yes
Test Drive 2001	No	—N/a	Xantera	Infogrames	December 5, 2000 (NA)	No	Yes	No
Test Drive Cycles	No	—N/a	Xantera	Infogrames	August 1, 2000 (NA)	No	Yes	No
Test Drive Le Mans •Le Mans 24 Hours^{EU}	No	—N/a	Velez & Dubail	Infogrames	June 2, 2000 (NA, EU)	No	Yes	Yes
Test Drive Off-Road 3 •4x4 World Trophy^{EU}	Yes	Rumble Pak	Xantera	Infogrames	November 1, 1999 (NA); April 19, 2000 (EU)	No	Yes	Yes
Tetris DX	Yes	—N/a	Nintendo	Nintendo	October 21, 1998 (JP); November 18, 1998 (NA); July 1, 1999 (EU)	Yes	Yes	Yes
Thomas the Tank Engine & Friends: The Friends of Sodor	No	—N/a	Tamsoft	Tamsoft	September 28, 2001 (JP)	Yes	No	No
Three Lions ^{EU}•Alexi Lala's International Soccer ^{NA} •Golden Goal^{DE} •Pro Foot^{FR}	Yes	—N/a	Tarantula Studios	Take 2 Interactive	April 17, 1999 (NA); January 1, 1999 (EU)	No	No	Yes
Thunderbirds	No	—N/a	Pukka Games	Sales Curve Interactive	December 1, 2000 (EU)	No	No	Yes
Tiger Woods PGA Tour 2000	Yes	—N/a	Xantera	THQ^{NA} EA Sports^{EU}	January 1, 2000 (NA); 1999 (EU)	No	Yes	Yes
Tintin: Le Temple Du Soleil	No	—N/a	Bit Managers	Infogrames	September 8, 2000 (EU)	No	No	Yes
Tintin in Tibet	No	—N/a	Bit Managers	Infogrames	December 3, 2001 (EU)	No	No	Yes
Tiny Toon Adventures: Buster Saves the Day	No	—N/a	Warthog	Conspiracy Entertainment	July 29, 2001 (NA); June 29, 2001 (EU)	No	Yes	Yes
Tiny Toon Adventures: Dizzy's Candy Quest	No	—N/a	Formula	Conspiracy Entertainment	November 2, 2001 (EU)	No	No	Yes
Titus the Fox	Yes	—N/a	Aqua Pacific	Titus Software	November 1, 2000 (NA); September 22, 2000 (EU)	No	Yes	Yes
TNN Outdoors Fishing Champ •Super Black Bass Pocket 3^{JP}	Yes	—N/a	Starfish	ASC Games^{NA} Starfish^{JP}	November 27, 1998 (JP); December 1, 1999 (NA)	Yes	Yes	No
TOCA Touring Car Championship	No	—N/a	Spellbound Entertainment	THQ	November 14, 2001 (NA); November 24, 2001 (EU)	No	Yes	Yes
Toki Tori	No	—N/a	Two Tribes Interactive	Capcom	September 12, 2001 (NA); March 1, 2002 (EU)	No	Yes	Yes
Tokimeki Memorial Pocket: Culture Hen: Komorebi no Melody	Yes	—N/a	KCEK	Konami	February 11, 1999 (JP)	Yes	No	No
Tokimeki Memorial Pocket: Sport Hen: Koutei no Photograph	Yes	—N/a	KCEK	Konami	February 11, 1999 (JP)	Yes	No	No
Tokoro-san no Setagaya Country Club	Yes	—N/a	Natsume Co., Ltd.	Natsume Co., Ltd.	August 11, 2000 (JP)	Yes	No	No
Tom and Jerry	No	—N/a	Morning Star Multimedia	Majesco	September 27, 1999 (NA); July 6, 2000 (EU)	No	Yes	Yes
Tom and Jerry: Mouse Hunt	No	—N/a	Conspiracy Entertainment	Conspiracy Entertainment; Swing! Entertainment Media AG^{EU}	March 14, 2001 (NA); December 15, 2000 (EU)	No	Yes	Yes
Tom and Jerry in Mouse Attacks!	No	—N/a	Warthog	NewKidCo^{NA} Ubi Soft^{EU}	December 8, 2000 (NA, EU)	No	Yes	Yes
Tomb Raider	No	—N/a	Core Design	THQ	June 8, 2000 (NA); July 8, 2000 (EU)	No	Yes	Yes
Tomb Raider: Curse of the Sword	No	—N/a	Core Design	Activision	June 1, 2001 (NA); August 17, 2001 (EU)	No	Yes	Yes
Tonic Trouble	No	—N/a	RFX Interactive	Ubi Soft	January 1, 2000 (EU)	No	No	Yes
Tonka Construction Site	No	—N/a	Sunset Entertainment	TDK Mediactive	May 30, 2002 (NA)	No	Yes	No
Tonka Raceway	No	Rumble Pak	Morning Star Multimedia	Hasbro Interactive	December 1, 1999 (NA, EU)	No	Yes	Yes
Tony Hawk's Pro Skater^{NA} •Tony Hawk's Skateboarding^{EU}	No	—N/a	Natsume Co., Ltd.	Activision	March 1, 2000 (NA, EU)	No	Yes	Yes
Tony Hawk's Pro Skater 2	No	—N/a	Natsume Co., Ltd.	Activision	November 7, 2000 (NA); November 17, 2000 (EU)	No	Yes	Yes
Tony Hawk's Pro Skater 3	No	—N/a	HotGen	Activision	November 15, 2001 (NA); November 23, 2001 (EU)	No	Yes	Yes
Toobin'	No	—N/a	Digital Eclipse	Midway	May 18, 2000 (NA)	No	Yes	No
Toonsylvania	No	—N/a	RFX Interactive	Ubi Soft	June 1, 2000 (NA, EU)	No	Yes	Yes
Tootuff•Titeuf^{FR}	No	—N/a	Planet Interactive	Infogrames	June 15, 2001 (EU)	No	No	Yes
Top Gear Pocket^{NA/JP} •Top Gear Rally^{EU}	No	Rumble Pak	Vision Works	Kemco	April 23, 1999 (JP, NA); 1999 (EU)	Yes	Yes	Yes
Top Gear Pocket 2^{NA/JP} •Top Gear Rally 2^{EU}	No	Rumble Pak (Japan only)	Vision Works	Vatical Entertainment^{NA} Kemco^{EU/JP}	December 17, 1999 (JP); January 1, 2000 (NA); 2000 (EU)	Yes	Yes	Yes
Top Gun: Firestorm	No	—N/a	Fluid Studios	Titus Software	December 4, 2001 (NA); July 20, 2001 (EU)	No	Yes	Yes
Toreedo & Batoru Kaado Hiiroo	Yes	—N/a	Nintendo R&D1; Intelligent Systems	Nintendo	February 21, 2000 (JP)	Yes	No	No
Totsugeki! Pappara Tai	Yes	—N/a		J-Wing	March 10, 2000 (JP)	Yes	No	No
Towers: Lord Baniff's Deceit	No	—N/a	JV Games	Vatical Entertainment^{NA} Telegames^{EU}	June 20, 2000 (NA, EU)	No	Yes	Yes
Toy Story 2	Yes	—N/a	Tiertex	THQ^{NA} Activision^{EU}	January 1, 1999 (NA); March 1, 2000 (EU)	No	Yes	Yes
Toy Story Racer	No	—N/a	Tiertex	Activision	February 28, 2001 (NA); March 9, 2001 (EU)	No	Yes	Yes
Trick Boarder •Trickboarder GP^{JP}	No	—N/a	Act Japan	Athena ^{JP} Natsume Inc.^{NA}	March 31, 2000 (JP); June 14, 2000 (NA); 2000 (EU)	Yes	Yes	Yes
Triple Play 2001	No	—N/a	Handheld Games	THQ	May 8, 2000 (NA, EU)	No	Yes	Yes
Trouballs	No	—N/a	Paragon 5	Capcom	October 2, 2001 (NA)	No	Yes	No
Tsuriiko!!	No	—N/a		ASCII Entertainment	July 19, 2001 (JP)	Yes	No	No
Tsuri Sensei 2	Yes	—N/a		J-Wing	July 23, 1999 (JP)	Yes	No	No
Turok: Rage Wars	No	—N/a	Bit Managers	Acclaim Entertainment	June 1, 2000 (NA, EU)	No	Yes	Yes
Turok 2: Seeds of Evil •Turok 2: Jikku Senshi^{JP}	Yes	—N/a	Bit Managers	Acclaim Entertainment	December 1, 1998 (NA, EU); September 10, 1999 (JP)	Yes	Yes	Yes
Turok 3: Shadow of Oblivion	No	—N/a	Bit Managers	Acclaim Entertainment	July 27, 2000 (NA); September 8, 2000 (EU)	No	Yes	Yes
Tweenies: Doodles' Bones	No	—N/a	Tiertex Design Studios	BBC Multimedia	October 19, 2001 (EU)	No	No	Yes
Tweety's High-Flying Adventure	No	—N/a	Kemco	Kemco	August 11, 2000 (JP); November 1, 2000 (NA, EU)	Yes	Yes	Yes
Tyco R/C Racin' Ratz	No	—N/a	KnowWonder	Mattel Interactive	November 28, 2000 (NA)	No	Yes	No
Uchuu Nin Tanaka Tarou de RPG Tsukuru GB2	No	—N/a		Enterbrain	July 20, 2001 (JP)	Yes	No	No
Ultimate Fighting Championship	No	—N/a	Fluid Studios	Crave Entertainment	November 27, 2000 (NA); 2001 (EU)	No	Yes	Yes
Ultimate Paintball	No	—N/a	Morning Star Multimedia	Majesco	September 1, 2000 (NA, EU)	No	Yes	Yes
Ultimate Surfing •Naminori Yarou!!^{JP}	No	—N/a	Act Japan	Natsume Inc.	July 1, 2001 (JP); June 5, 2001 (NA); June 18, 2001 (EU)	Yes	Yes	Yes
Uno	Yes	—N/a	HotGen	Mattel Interactive	December 16, 1999 (NA); December 15, 2000 (EU)	No	Yes	Yes
Vegas Games	No	—N/a	Digital Eclipse	3DO	February 1, 2000 (NA); 2000 (EU)	No	Yes	Yes
Vigilante 8	No	Rumble Pak	Vicarious Visions	Vatical Entertainment	December 15, 1999 (NA)	No	Yes	No
VIP	No	—N/a	Planet Interactive	Ubi Soft	August 24, 2001 (NA, EU)	No	Yes	Yes
V-Rally: Edition '99 •V-Rally: Championship Edition^{EU/JP}	No	—N/a	Bit Managers	Infogrames^{NA/EU} Spike^{JP}	June 1, 1999 (NA, EU); October 14, 1999 (JP)	Yes	Yes	Yes
Wacky Races •Chiki Chiki Machine Mou Race^{JP}	No	—N/a	Velez & Dubail	Infogrames^{NA/EU} Syscom^{JP}	November 22, 2001 (JP); June 9, 2000 (NA); June 30, 2000 (EU)	Yes	Yes	Yes
Walt Disney World Quest: Magical Racing Tour	No	—N/a	Prolific	Activision^{NA} Eidos Interactive^{EU}	December 7, 2000 (NA); December 15, 2000 (EU)	No	Yes	Yes
Warau Inu no Bouken GB: Silly Go Lucky!	No	—N/a	Capcom	Capcom	February 23, 2001 (JP)	Yes	No	No
Wario Land II	Yes	—N/a	Nintendo R&D1	Nintendo	October 21, 1998 (JP); March 31, 1999 (NA); 1999 (EU)	Yes	Yes	Yes
Wario Land 3	No	—N/a	Nintendo R&D1	Nintendo	March 21, 2000 (JP); May 30, 2000 (NA); April 14, 2000 (EU)	Yes	Yes	Yes
Warlocked	No	—N/a	Bits Studios	Nintendo	July 24, 2000 (NA)	No	Yes	No
Warriors of Might and Magic	No	—N/a	Climax Studios	The 3DO Company	December 22, 2000 (NA); April 6, 2001 (EU)	No	Yes	Yes
Watashi no Kitchen	No	—N/a		Kirat	December 21, 2001 (JP)	Yes	No	No
Watashi no Restaurant	No	—N/a		Kirat	April 26, 2002 (JP)	Yes	No	No
WCW Mayhem	No	—N/a	2n Productions	Electronic Arts	May 10, 2000 (NA); August 3, 2000 (EU)	No	Yes	Yes
Wendy: Every Witch Way	No	GBA Special Features	WayForward Technologies	TDK Mediactive	April 28, 2001 (NA, EU)	No	Yes	Yes
Wendy: Der Traum von Arizona	No	—N/a	Kiddinx	Kiddinx	November 20, 2002 (DE)	No	No	Yes
Wetrix GB	Yes (JP only)	—N/a	Zed Two Ltd.	Infogrames^{EU} Imagineer^{JP}	October 29, 1999 (JP); September 29, 2000 (EU)	Yes	No	Yes
Who Wants to Be a Millionaire: 2nd Edition	No	—N/a	Valleycrest Productions	THQ	September 25, 2000 (NA)	No	Yes	No
The Wild Thornberrys: Rambler	No	—N/a	Vicarious Visions	Mattel Interactive	October 31, 2000 (NA)	No	Yes	No
Wings of Fury	Yes	—N/a	Magnin & Associates	Red Orb Entertainment	December 1, 1999 (NA, EU)	No	Yes	Yes
Winnie the Pooh: Adventures in the 100 Acre Wood •Kuma no Pooh-san: Mori no Takaramono^{JP}	No	—N/a	TOSE	NewKidCo^{NA} Ubisoft^{EU} Tomy^{JP}	July 7, 2000 (JP); March 1, 2000 (NA); April 1, 2000 (EU)	Yes	Yes	Yes
Wizardry: Proving Grounds of the Mad Overlord	No	—N/a	Game Studio	ASCII Entertainment	February 23, 2001 (JP)	Yes	No	No
Wizardry II: Llygamyn no Isan	No	—N/a	Game Studio	ASCII Entertainment	February 23, 2001 (JP)	Yes	No	No
Wizardry III: Diamond no Kishi	No	—N/a	Game Studio	ASCII Entertainment	February 23, 2001 (JP)	Yes	No	No
Wizardry Empire	No	—N/a		Starfish	October 29, 1999 (JP)	Yes	No	No
Wizardry Empire: Fukkatsu no Tsue	No	—N/a		Starfish	December 22, 2000 (JP)	Yes	No	No
Woody Woodpecker: Escape from Buzz Buzzard Park	No	—N/a	Planet Interactive	DreamCatcher Interactive^{NA} Cryo Interactive^{EU}	September 1, 2001 (NA, EU)	No	Yes	Yes
Woody Woodpecker Racing •Woody Woodpecker no Go! Go! Racing^{JP}	No	—N/a	Konami	Konami	March 15, 2001 (JP); December 15, 2000 (NA, EU)	Yes	Yes	Yes
World Destruction League: Thunder Tanks	No	—N/a	Sunset Entertainment	The 3DO Company	December 12, 2000 (NA); April 6, 2001 (EU)	No	Yes	Yes
The World Is Not Enough	No	—N/a	2n Productions	Electronic Arts	September 11, 2001 (NA); September 28, 2001 (EU)	No	Yes	Yes
Worms: Armageddon	No	—N/a	Infogrames	Infogrames	January 1, 2000 (NA); 2000 (EU)	No	Yes	Yes
WWF Attitude	No	—N/a	Crawfish Interactive	Acclaim Sports	June 1, 1999 (NA); 1999 (EU)	No	Yes	Yes
WWF Betrayal	No	—N/a	WayForward	THQ	August 7, 2001 (NA); August 24, 2001 (EU)	No	Yes	Yes
WWF WrestleMania 2000	Yes	—N/a	Natsume Co., Ltd.	THQ	November 1, 1999 (NA, EU)	No	Yes	Yes
X-Men: Mutant Academy	No	—N/a	Crawfish Interactive	Activision^{NA} Success^{JP}	July 1, 2000 (NA); April 27, 2001 (JP)	Yes	Yes	No
X-Men: Mutant Wars	No	—N/a	Avit, Inc.	Activision	November 17, 2000 (NA, EU)	No	Yes	Yes
X-Men: Wolverine's Rage	No	—N/a	Digital Eclipse	Activision	May 15, 2001 (NA); June 15, 2001 (EU)	No	Yes	Yes
Xena: Warrior Princess	No	—N/a	Titus Software	Titus Software	August 1, 2001 (NA); September 14, 2001 (EU)	No	Yes	Yes
Xtreme Sports	No	—N/a	WayForward	Infogrames	June 28, 2000 (NA)	No	Yes	No
Xtreme Wheels	No	—N/a	Spike	Bam! Entertainment^{NA} Bergsala^{EU}	November 23, 2000 (EU); April 26, 2001 (NA)	No	Yes	Yes
Yakouchuu GB	No	—N/a	Athena	Athena	October 22, 1999 (JP)	Yes	No	No
Yars' Revenge	Yes	—N/a	Telegames	Telegames	September 1, 1999 (NA); 2000 (EU)	No	Yes	Yes
Yogi Bear: Great Balloon Blast •Pop'n Pop^{EU, JP}	No	—N/a	ITL	Bam! Entertainment^{NA} JVC Music Europe^{EU} Jorudan^{JP}	December 17, 2000 (NA); February 16, 2001 (JP); 2001 (EU)	Yes	Yes	Yes
Yu-Gi-Oh! Duel Monsters II: Dark Duel Stories	Yes	—N/a	Konami	Konami	July 8, 1999 (JP)	Yes	No	No
Yu-Gi-Oh! Dark Duel Stories •Yu-Gi-Oh! Duel Monsters III: Tri-Holy God Advent^{JP}	No	—N/a	Konami	Konami	July 13, 2000 (JP); March 18, 2002 (NA); March 1, 2003 (EU)	Yes	Yes	Yes
Yu-Gi-Oh! Duel Monsters 4: Battle of Great Duelists - Jounouchi Deck	No	—N/a	Konami	Konami	December 7, 2000 (JP)	Yes	No	No
Yu-Gi-Oh! Duel Monsters 4: Battle of Great Duelists - Kaiba Deck	No	—N/a	Konami	Konami	December 7, 2000 (JP)	Yes	No	No
Yu-Gi-Oh! Duel Monsters 4: Battle of Great Duelists - Yugi Deck	No	—N/a	Konami	Konami	December 7, 2000 (JP)	Yes	No	No
Yu-Gi-Oh! Monster Capsule GB	Yes	—N/a	Konami	Konami	April 13, 2000 (JP)	Yes	No	No
Zebco Fishing	No	Rumble Pak	Vicarious Visions	Vatical Entertainment	September 1, 1999 (NA); October 20, 2000 (EU)	No	Yes	Yes
Zen-Nippon Shounen Soccer Taikai: Mezase Nippon Ichi!	No	—N/a	Boom	Success	September 7, 2001 (JP)	Yes	No	No
Zidane: Football Generation	No	—N/a	Aqua Pacific	Cryo Interactive	June 14, 2002 (EU)	No	No	Yes
Zoboomafoo: Playtime in Zobooland	No	—N/a	Vicarious Visions	Encore Software	October 1, 2001 (NA)	No	Yes	No
Zoids: Jashin Fukkatsu! Genobreaker Hen	Yes	—N/a	Tomy Corporation	Tomy Corporation	August 4, 2000 (JP)	Yes	No	No
Zoids: Shirogane no Jukishin Liger Zero	No	—N/a	Will	Tomy Corporation	June 15, 2001 (JP)	Yes	No	No
Zok Zok Heroes	No	—N/a	KAZe	Media Factory	August 4, 2000 (JP)	Yes	No	No

== Games exclusive to Nintendo Power cartridge peripheral ==
Several games were released only digitally through the Japanese exclusive Nintendo Power Game Boy peripheral.

Title	Dual Mode	Cartridge feature	Developer	Publisher	First released	JP	NA	EU/PAL
Koguru Guruguru: Guruguru to Nakayoshi	No	—N/a		Sting	July 1, 2001 (JP)	Yes	No	No
Loppi Puzzle Magazine: Hirameku Puzzle Dai-2-Gou	No	—N/a		Success	October 1, 2001 (JP)	Yes	No	No
Loppi Puzzle Magazine: Hirameku Puzzle Dai-3-Gou	No	—N/a		Success	December 1, 2001 (JP)	Yes	No	No
Loppi Puzzle Magazine: Hirameku Puzzle Soukangou	No	—N/a	Game Studio	Success	September 1, 2001 (JP)	Yes	No	No
Loppi Puzzle Magazine: Kangaeru Puzzle Dai-2-Gou	No	—N/a		Success	October 1, 2001 (JP)	Yes	No	No
Loppi Puzzle Magazine: Kangaeru Puzzle Dai-3-Gou	No	—N/a		Success	December 1, 2001 (JP)	Yes	No	No
Loppi Puzzle Magazine: Kangaeru Puzzle Soukangou	No	—N/a	Game Studio	Success	August 1, 2001 (JP)	Yes	No	No

== Aftermarket releases ==
Title	Backward compatible	Cartridge feature	Developer	Publisher	First released
Buck and the Cursed Cartridge	No	—N/a	ModRetro	GameStop	October 31, 2025
Grimace's Birthday	No	—N/a	Krool Toys	McDonald's	June 12, 2023
Infinity	No	—N/a	Incube8 Games	Incube8 Games	December 22, 2025
Patchy Matchy	Yes	—N/a	ModRetro	ModRetro	December 17, 2024
Rugrats Portable Collection	No	—N/a	Software Creations	Limited Run Games	2027
Tobu Tobu Girl Deluxe	Yes	—N/a	Tangram Games	First Press Games	October 28, 2019
Tyrannosaurus Tex	No	—N/a	Slitherine Software	Piko Interactive	May 2018

== See also ==
- Lists of video games
- Lists of Game Boy games
- List of Game Boy games
- List of Game Boy Advance games
- List of Super Game Boy games
- List of cancelled Game Boy Color games
