= List of video games based on cartoons =

This is a list of video games based on cartoon television series and movies. The list does not include games based on Japanese anime, which are separately listed at List of video games based on anime or manga.

== Games ==
Television series or movie	Game title	Platform(s)
Aaahh!!! Real Monsters	Aaahh!!! Real Monsters	Mega Drive/Genesis, SNES
Aladdin	Disney's Aladdin	Genesis, SNES, Game Boy, MS-DOS, Amiga, NES, Game Gear, Master System
Aladdin	Disney's Aladdin: Nasira's Revenge	PlayStation, PC, Game Boy Color
Aladdin	Disney's Aladdin Chess Adventures	Windows
Aladdin	Aladdin: Lamp Guardian	iOS, Android
Aladdin	Disney Classic Games: Aladdin and The Lion King	Nintendo Switch, PlayStation 4, Xbox One, PC
Action Man	Action Man	PC
Action Man	Action Man: Robot Atak	Game Boy Advance
Action Man	Action Man: Search for Base X	GBC
Action Man	Action Man 2	PC
Action Man	Action Man: Arctic Adventure	PC
Action Man	Action Man: Destruction X	PlayStation
Action Man	Action Man: Operation Extreme	PlayStation
Adventure Time	Adventure Time: Hey Ice King! Why'd You Steal Our Garbage?!!	Nintendo DS, Nintendo 3DS
Adventure Time	Adventure Time: Explore the Dungeon Because I Don't Know!	Nintendo 3DS, PS3, Xbox 360, Wii U
Adventure Time	Adventure Time: The Secret of the Nameless Kingdom	Windows, Nintendo 3DS, PS3, PS Vita, Xbox 360
Adventure Time	Adventure Time: Finn & Jake Investigations	Windows, Nintendo 3DS, PS3, PS4, Xbox 360, Xbox One, Wii U
Adventure Time	Adventure Time: Pirates of the Enchiridion	Windows, Switch, PS4, Xbox One
Alvin and the Chipmunks	Alvin and the Chipmunks	Nintendo DS, PS2, Wii, Windows
Alvin and the Chipmunks	Alvin and the Chipmunks: The Squeakquel	Wii, Nintendo DS
Alvin and the Chipmunks	Alvin and the Chipmunks: Chipwrecked	Xbox 360, Wii, Nintendo DS
American Dragon: Jake Long	Disney's American Dragon: Jake Long, Attack of the Dark Dragon	Nintendo DS
American Dragon: Jake Long	Rise of the Huntsclan	Game Boy Advance
Animaniacs	Animaniacs	Game Boy, Mega Drive/Genesis, SNES
Animaniacs	Animaniacs: Ten Pin Alley	PlayStation
Animaniacs	Animaniacs Ten Pin Alley 2	PlayStation
Animaniacs	Animaniacs: A Gigantic Adventure	PC
Animaniacs	Animaniacs Splat Ball	PC
Animaniacs	Animaniacs: Pinky & the Brain	Game Boy Advance
Animaniacs	Animaniacs: The Great Edgar Hunt	GameCube, PS2 (Europe only), Xbox
Animaniacs	Animaniacs: Lights, Camera, Action!	Game Boy Advance, Nintendo DS
Aqua Teen Hunger Force	Aqua Teen Hunger Force Zombie Ninja Pro-Am	PS2
A.T.O.M.	Action Man ATOM: Alpha Teens on Machines	PS2
Atomic Betty	Atomic Betty	Game Boy Advance
Attack of the Killer Tomatoes: The Animated Series	Attack of the Killer Tomatoes	Game Boy, NES
Avatar: The Last Airbender	Avatar: The Last Airbender	Wii, Nintendo DS, GameCube, Game Boy Advance, PS2, PSP, Xbox, Windows
Avatar: The Last Airbender	Avatar: The Last Airbender – The Burning Earth	Wii, Nintendo DS, Game Boy Advance, PS2, Xbox 360
Avatar: The Last Airbender	Avatar: The Last Airbender – Into the Inferno	Wii, Nintendo DS, PS2
Avatar: The Last Airbender	The Last Airbender	Wii, Nintendo DS
Back at the Barnyard	Barnyard	PC, Game Boy Advance, PS2, GameCube, Wii
Back at the Barnyard	Back at the Barnyard: Slop Bucket Games	Nintendo DS
Beavis and Butt-Head	Beavis and Butt-Head	Game Boy, Game Gear, Mega Drive/Genesis, SNES
Beavis and Butt-Head	Beavis and Butt-Head: Bunghole in One	PC
Beavis and Butt-Head	Beavis and Butt-Head in Calling All Dorks	PC
Beavis and Butt-Head	Beavis and Butt-Head Do U.	PC
Beavis and Butt-Head	Beavis and Butt-Head in Little Thingies	PC
Beavis and Butt-Head	Beavis and Butt-Head in Virtual Stupidity	PC, PlayStation (Japan only)
Beavis and Butt-Head	Beavis and Butt-Head in Wiener Takes All	PC
Ben 10	Ben 10: Protector of Earth	Nintendo DS, PS2, PSP, Wii
Ben 10	Ben 10: Alien Force	PC, PS2, PSP, Wii
Ben 10	Ben 10 Alien Force: Vilgax Attacks	Nintendo DS, PS2, PSP, Wii, Xbox 360
Ben 10	Ben 10 Alien Force: The Rise of Hex	Wii, Xbox 360
Ben 10	Ben 10 Ultimate Alien: Cosmic Destruction	Nintendo DS, Wii, Xbox 360, PS2, PS3, PSP
Ben 10	Ben 10: Galactic Racing	Nintendo DS, Nintendo 3DS, Wii, PS3, PS Vita, Xbox 360
Ben 10	Ben 10: Omniverse	Nintendo DS, Nintendo 3DS, Wii, Wii U, Xbox 360, PS3
Ben 10	Ben 10: Omniverse 2	Nintendo 3DS, Wii, Wii U, Xbox 360, PS3
Ben 10	Ben 10 (2016 reboot) video game	PS4, Xbox One, Windows, Switch
Ben 10	Ben 10: Power Trip	PS4, Xbox One, Windows, Switch
Betty Boop	Betty Boop's Double Shift	Nintendo DS
Biker Mice from Mars	Biker Mice from Mars 1994	SNES
Biker Mice from Mars	Biker Mice from Mars 2006	PS2, Nintendo DS
Bobby's World	Bobby's World	SNES
Bonkers	Bonkers	Mega Drive/Genesis, SNES
Bonkers	Bonkers: Wax Up!	Game Gear, Master System (Brazil only)
Bucky O'Hare	Bucky O'Hare	Arcade, NES
Bugs Bunny	The Bugs Bunny Crazy Castle	NES
Bugs Bunny	Bugs Bunny Crazy Castle series	Game Boy (Up to Crazy Castle 4)
Bugs Bunny	The Bugs Bunny Birthday Blowout	NES
Bugs Bunny	Bugs Bunny Rabbit Rampage	SNES
Bugs Bunny	Bugs Bunny in Double Trouble	Game Gear, Genesis
Bugs Bunny	Bugs Bunny & Lola Bunny: Carrot Crazy	Game Boy Color
Bugs Bunny	Bugs Bunny: Lost in Time	PlayStation, Windows
Bugs Bunny	Bugs Bunny & Taz: Time Busters	PlayStation, Windows
Buzz Lightyear of Star Command	Buzz Lightyear of Star Command	GBC, Dreamcast, PlayStation, Windows
Camp Lazlo	Camp Lazlo: Leaky Lake Games	Game Boy Advance
Captain Planet and the Planeteers	Captain Planet and the Planeteers	NES, Amiga, Amstrad CPC, ZX Spectrum
Selected Cartoon Network shows	Cartoon Network Speedway	Game Boy Advance
Selected Cartoon Network shows	Cartoon Network: Block Party	Game Boy Advance
Selected Cartoon Network shows	Cartoon Network Racing	Nintendo DS, PS2
Selected Cartoon Network shows	Cartoon Network Universe: FusionFall	Windows, MacOS
Selected Cartoon Network shows	Cartoon Network: Punch Time Explosion	Nintendo 3DS, PS2, PS3, Wii, Xbox
Selected Cartoon Network shows	Cartoon Network Universe: Project Exonaut	Windows, MacOS
Selected Cartoon Network shows	Cartoon Network Universe: FusionFall Heroes	Windows, MacOS
Selected Cartoon Network shows	Cartoon Network: Battle Crashers	PS4, Xbox One, Nintendo 3DS, Switch
Casper the Friendly Ghost	Casper	PlayStation, Saturn, 3DO, Game Boy, SNES, GBC, Game Boy Advance, Windows
Casper the Friendly Ghost	Casper: The Interactive Adventure	CD-ROM
Casper the Friendly Ghost	Casper: A Spirited Beginning Activity Center	PC
Casper the Friendly Ghost	Casper: Friends Around the World	PlayStation
Casper the Friendly Ghost	Casper: Spirit Dimensions	GameCube, PS2
Casper the Friendly Ghost	Casper and the Ghostly Trio	PS2
Casper the Friendly Ghost	Casper's Scare School	PS2
Casper the Friendly Ghost	Casper's Scare School: Classroom Capers	Nintendo DS
Casper the Friendly Ghost	Casper's Scare School: Scary Sports Day	Nintendo DS, Wii
CatDog	CatDog: Quest for the Golden Hydrant	PC
Chaotic	Chaotic: Shadow Warriors	Xbox 360, Wii, PS3, Nintendo DS
Chip 'n Dale Rescue Rangers	Chip 'n Dale Rescue Rangers	NES
Chip 'n Dale Rescue Rangers	Chip 'n Dale Rescue Rangers 2	NES
Code Lyoko	Code Lyoko	Nintendo DS
Code Lyoko	Code Lyoko: Quest for Infinity	PS2, PSP, Wii
Code Lyoko	Code Lyoko: Fall of X.A.N.A.	Nintendo DS
Codename: Kids Next Door	Operation: S.O.D.A.	Game Boy Advance
Codename: Kids Next Door	Operation: V.I.D.E.O.G.A.M.E.	GameCube, PS2, Xbox
Cubix	Cubix Robots for Everyone: Showdown	GameCube, PS2
Cyberchase	Cyberchase: Carnival Chaos	Windows, MacOS
Cyberchase	Cyberchase: Castleblanca Quest	Windows, MacOS
Danny Phantom	Danny Phantom: The Ultimate Enemy	Game Boy Advance
Danny Phantom	Danny Phantom: Urban Jungle	Game Boy Advance, Nintendo DS
Darkwing Duck	Darkwing Duck	Game Boy, NES
Darkwing Duck	Darkwing Duck	TurboGrafx-16
Dexter's Laboratory	Dexter's Laboratory: Robot Rampage	Game Boy Color
Dexter's Laboratory	Dexter's Laboratory: Deesaster Strikes!	Game Boy Advance
Dexter's Laboratory	Dexter's Laboratory: Science Ain't Fair	PC
Dexter's Laboratory	Dexter's Laboratory: Mandark's Lab?	PlayStation
Dexter's Laboratory	Dexter's Laboratory: Chess Challenge	Game Boy Advance
Di-Gata Defenders	Di-Gata Defenders	Nintendo DS
Donald Duck	Deep Duck Trouble Starring Donald Duck	Game Gear, Master System
Donald Duck	QuackShot	Mega Drive/Genesis
Donald Duck	World of Illusion Starring Mickey Mouse and Donald Duck	Mega Drive/Genesis
Donald Duck	Maui Mallard in Cold Shadow	Game Boy, Mega Drive/Genesis, SNES
Donald Duck	Donald Duck: Goin' Quackers	Dreamcast, Game Boy Advance (as Donald Duck Advance), Game Boy Color, GameCube, Nintendo 64, PlayStation, PS2, Windows
Donald Duck	Kingdom Hearts	PS2
Donald Duck	Disney's PK: Out of the Shadows	GameCube, PS2
Donald Duck	Kingdom Hearts: Chain of Memories	Game Boy Advance
Donald Duck	Kingdom Hearts II	PS2
Donald Duck	Kingdom Hearts lll	PS4, Windows, Xbox One
Dora the Explorer	Dora the Explorer: Journey to the Purple Planet	GameCube, PS2
Dora the Explorer	Dora the Explorer: Dance to the Rescue	PC
Dora the Explorer	Dora the Explorer: Super Spies	Game Boy Advance
Dora the Explorer	Dora the Explorer: The Search for Pirate Pig's Treasure	Game Boy Advance
Dora the Explorer	Dora the Explorer: Dora's World Adventure	Game Boy Advance
Dora the Explorer	Dora the Explorer: Backpack Adventure	PC
Dora the Explorer	Dora the Explorer: Super Star Adventures	Game Boy Advance
Doraemon	Doraemon Story of seasons	Nintendo Switch, PC, PlayStation 4
Doug	Doug's Big Game	Game Boy Color
Droopy	Droopy's Tennis Open	Game Boy Advance
Duckman	Duckman: The Graphic Adventures of a Private Dick	Windows
DuckTales	Disney's DuckTales	NES
DuckTales	DuckTales 2	Game Boy, NES
DuckTales	DuckTales: The Quest for Gold	PC
Ed, Edd n Eddy	Ed, Edd n Eddy: Jawbreakers!	Game Boy Advance
Ed, Edd n Eddy	Ed, Edd n Eddy: The Mis-Edventures	Game Boy Advance, GameCube, PC, PS2, Xbox
Ed, Edd n Eddy	Ed, Edd n Eddy: Scam of the Century	Nintendo DS
Eek! The Cat	Eek! The Cat	SNES
El Chavo Animado	El Chavo	Wii
El Chavo Animado	El Chavo Kart	Xbox 360, PlayStation 3, Android
El Tigre: The Adventures of Manny Rivera	El Tigre: The Adventures of Manny Rivera	Nintendo DS, PS2
Extreme Ghostbusters	Extreme Ghostbusters	Game Boy Color
Extreme Ghostbusters	Extreme Ghostbusters: Code Ecto-1	Game Boy Advance
Extreme Ghostbusters	Extreme Ghostbusters: The Ultimate Invasion	PlayStation
Family Dog	Family Dog	SNES
Family Guy	Family Guy Video Game!	PS2, PSP, Xbox
Family Guy	Family Guy: Back to the Multiverse	PC, PS3, Xbox 360
Felix the Cat	Felix the Cat	NES
Foster's Home for Imaginary Friends	Foster's Home for Imaginary Friends	Game Boy Advance
Foster's Home for Imaginary Friends	Foster's Home for Imaginary Friends: Imagination Invaders	Nintendo DS
Futurama	Futurama	PS2, Xbox
Gargoyles	Gargoyles	Genesis
Generator Rex	Generator Rex: Agent of Providence	Nintendo DS, Nintendo 3DS, Wii, PS3, Xbox 360
George of the Jungle	George of the Jungle and the Search for the Secret	Wii, PS2, Nintendo DS
G.I. Joe	G.I. Joe	NES
G.I. Joe	G.I. Joe	Computers
G.I. Joe	G.I. Joe	Arcade
G.I. Joe	G.I. Joe: The Atlantis Factor	NES
Go, Diego, Go!	Go, Diego, Go!: Great Dinosaur Rescue	Wii, Nintendo DS
Go, Diego, Go!	Go, Diego, Go!: Safari Rescue	Wii, Nintendo DS, PC, PS2
Godzilla: The Series	Godzilla: The Series: Monster Wars	Game Boy Color
Goof Troop	Goof Troop	SNES
Gravity Falls	Gravity Falls: Legend of the Gnome Gemulets	Nintendo 3DS
Harvey Birdman, Attorney at Law	Harvey Birdman: Attorney at Law	PS2, Wii, PSP
He-Man and the Masters of the Universe	Masters of the Universe: The Power of He-Man	Atari 2600, Intellivision
He-Man and the Masters of the Universe	Masters of the Universe: The Ilearth Stone	Commodore 64
He-Man and the Masters of the Universe	Masters of the Universe: Terraquake	Commodore 64, Spectrum Z80
He-Man and the Masters of the Universe	Masters of the Universe	Spectrum Z80
He-Man and the Masters of the Universe	He-Man: Defender of Grayskull	PS2
He-Man and the Masters of the Universe	He-Man: Power of Grayskull	Game Boy Advance
Hey Arnold!	Hey Arnold!: The Movie	Game Boy Advance
Hi Hi Puffy AmiYumi	Hi Hi Puffy AmiYumi: Kaznapped!	Game Boy Advance
Hi Hi Puffy AmiYumi	Hi Hi Puffy AmiYumi: The Genie and the Amp	Nintendo DS
Hot Wheels Battle Force 5	Hot Wheels Battle Force 5	Wii, Nintendo DS
Ice Age	Ice Age	Game Boy Advance
Ice Age	Ice Age 2: The Meltdown	PS2, Xbox, Windows, Nintendo DS,
Ice Age	Ice Age: Dawn of the Dinosaurs	PS2, Wii, Windows, Nintendo DS
Ice Age	Ice Age: Continental Drift – Arctic Games	PS3, Xbox 360, Wii, Windows, Nintendo 3DS
Ice Age	Ice Age Village	Mobile
Ice Age	Ice Age Adventures	Mobile
Ice Age	Ice Age Avalanche	Mobile
Ice Age	Ice Age: Scrat's Nutty Adventure	PS4, Xbox One, Switch, Windows
Inspector Gadget	Inspector Gadget	SNES
Inspector Gadget	Inspector Gadget and the Circus of Fear	Commodore 64, ZX Spectrum
Inspector Gadget	Inspector Gadget: Mission Global Terror	PC
Inspector Gadget	Inspector Gadget: Gadget's Crazy Maze	PlayStation
Inspector Gadget	Inspector Gadget: Mad Robots Invasion	PS2
Inspector Gadget	Inspector Gadget Racers	Game Boy Advance
Inspector Gadget	Inspector Gadget: Advance Mission	Game Boy Advance
Inspector Gadget	Inspector Gadget: Operation Madkatus	Game Boy Color
Inspector Gadget	Gadget and the Gadgetinis	PS2
Jackie Chan Adventures	Jackie Chan Adventures	PS2
Jackie Chan Adventures	Jackie Chan Adventures: Legend of the Dark Hand	Game Boy Advance
Johnny Bravo	Johnny Bravo In The Hukka Mega Mighty Ultra Extreme Date-O-Rama!	Nintendo DS, PS2
Johnny Test	Johnny Test	Nintendo DS
Kim Possible	Disney's Kim Possible: Revenge of Monkey Fist	Game Boy Advance
Kim Possible	Disney's Kim Possible 2: Drakken's Demise	Game Boy Advance
Kim Possible	Disney's Kim Possible 3: Team Possible	Game Boy Advance
Kim Possible	Disney's Kim Possible: What's the Switch?	PS2
Kim Possible	Disney's Kim Possible: Global Gemini	Nintendo DS
Kim Possible	Disney's Kim Possible: Legend of the Monkeys Eye	PC
Kim Possible	Disney's Kim Possible: Kimmunicator	Nintendo DS
King Arthur & the Knights of Justice	King Arthur & the Knights of Justice	SNES
Legend of the Dragon	Legend of the Dragon	Wii, PS2, PSP
Looney Tunes	Looney Tunes	Game Boy, GBC
Looney Tunes	Daffy Duck: The Marvin Missions	SNES
Looney Tunes	Daffy Duck in Hollywood	Game Gear, Master System, Genesis
Looney Tunes	Acme Animation Factory	SNES
Looney Tunes	Porky Pig's Haunted Holiday	SNES
Looney Tunes	Daffy Duck: Fowl Play	Game Boy Color
Looney Tunes	Duck Dodgers Starring Daffy Duck	Nintendo 64
Looney Tunes	Looney Tunes Racing	Game Boy Color, PlayStation
Looney Tunes	Looney Tunes: Space Race	Dreamcast, PS2 (as Space Race)
Looney Tunes	Sheep Raider	PC, PlayStation
Looney Tunes	Looney Tunes: Back in Action	PS2, GameCube, Game Boy Advance
Looney Tunes	Looney Tunes Double Pack	Game Boy Advance
Looney Tunes	Looney Tunes: Acme Arsenal	PS2, Wii, Xbox, Xbox 360, Nintendo DS, PSP, PS3
Looney Tunes	Looney Tunes: Duck Amuck	Nintendo DS
Max Steel	Max Steel: Covert Missions	Dreamcast
Mickey Mouse	Castle of Illusion Starring Mickey Mouse	Master System, Mega Drive/Genesis
Mickey Mouse	Epic Mickey	Wii, Nintendo Switch, PS4, PS5, Windows, Xbox One, Xbox Series X/S
Mickey Mouse	Epic Mickey 2: The Power of Two	PC, PS3, Wii, Xbox 360, PSV
Mickey Mouse	Epic Mickey: Power of Illusion	Nintendo 3DS
Mickey Mouse	Land of Illusion Starring Mickey Mouse	Game Gear, Master System
Mickey Mouse	World of Illusion Starring Mickey Mouse and Donald Duck	Mega Drive/Genesis
Mickey Mouse	Legend of Illusion Starring Mickey Mouse	Game Gear
Mickey Mouse	Great Circus Mystery Starring Mickey & Minnie	Game Boy Advance, Mega Drive/Genesis, SNES
Mickey Mouse	Disney Illusion Island	Nintendo Switch, PS5, Windows, Xbox Series X and Series S
Mickey Mouse	Magical Tetris Challenge	GBC, Nintendo 64, PlayStation
Mickey Mouse	Mickey Mousecapade	NES
Mickey Mouse	Disney's Magical Quest	Game Boy Advance, Mega Drive/Genesis, SNES
Mickey Mouse	Disney's Magical Mirror	GameCube
Mickey Mouse	Disney's Hide and Sneak	GameCube
Mickey Mouse	Mickey Mania	Sega CD, Mega Drive/Genesis, SNES
Mickey Mouse	Mickey's Dangerous Chase	Game Boy
Mickey Mouse	Mickey's Racing Adventure	GBC
Mickey Mouse	Mickey's Speedway USA	Nintendo 64
Mickey Mouse	Walt Disney World Quest: Magical Racing Tour	Dreamcast, GBC, PlayStation
Mickey Mouse	Adventures in the Magic Kingdom	NES
Mighty Max	Mighty Max	Genesis, SNES
Mr. Bean: The Animated Series	Mr. Bean's Wacky World	Nintendo DS, Wii, PS2
¡Mucha Lucha!	¡Mucha Lucha!: Mascaritas of the Lost Code	Game Boy Advance
Nicktoons
Nicktoons	Nickelodeon 3D Movie Maker	Windows
Nicktoons	Nicktoons Racing	Arcade, Game Boy Advance, GBC, Windows, PlayStation
Nicktoons	Nicktoons Nick Tunes	CD-ROM
Nicktoons	Nickelodeon Party Blast	Xbox, GameCube, Windows
Nicktoons	Nickelodeon Toon Twister 3-D	Windows
Nicktoons	Nicktoons Basketball	PC
Nicktoons	Nicktoons: Freeze Frame Frenzy	Game Boy Advance
Nicktoons	Nicktoons Movin'	PS2
Nicktoons	Nicktoons Unite!	Nintendo DS, Game Boy Advance, GameCube, PS2
Nicktoons	Nicktoons Winners Cup Racing	Windows
Nicktoons	Nicktoons: Battle for Volcano Island	Nintendo DS, Game Boy Advance, GameCube, PS2
Nicktoons	Nicktoons: Attack of the Toybots	Wii, Nintendo DS, PS2, Game Boy Advance
Nicktoons	Nicktoons: Android Invasion	LeapFrog Didj
Nicktoons	Nicktoons: Globs of Doom	Nintendo DS, PS2, Wii
Nicktoons	Nicktoons Nitro	Arcade
Nicktoons	Nicktoons MLB	Nintendo DS, 3DS, Wii, Xbox 360
Nicktoons	Nickelodeon Kart Racers	PS4, Xbox One, Switch
Nicktoons	Nickelodeon Kart Racers 2: Grand Prix	PS4, Xbox One, Switch
Nicktoons	Nickelodeon All-Star Brawl	PS4, PS5, Xbox One, Switch, Windows
Nicktoons	Nickelodeon Kart Racers 3: Slime Speedway	PS4, PS5, Xbox One, Switch, Windows
Nicktoons	Nickelodeon All-Star Brawl 2	PS4, PS5, Xbox One, Xbox Series X/S, Switch, Windows
OK K.O.! Let's Be Heroes	OK K.O.! Lakewood Plaza Turbo	Mobile
OK K.O.! Let's Be Heroes	OK K.O.! Let's Play Heroes	Xbox One, Windows, PS4
Oswald the Lucky Rabbit	Epic Mickey	Wii, Nintendo Switch, PS4, PS5, Windows, Xbox One, Xbox Series X/S
Oswald the Lucky Rabbit	Epic Mickey 2: The Power of Two	PC, PS3, Wii, Wii U, Xbox 360, PSV
Oswald the Lucky Rabbit	Epic Mickey: Power of Illusion	Nintendo 3DS
Pet Alien	Pet Alien	Nintendo DS
Peter Pan and the Pirates	Peter Pan and the Pirates	NES
Phineas and Ferb	Phineas and Ferb	Nintendo DS
Phineas and Ferb	Phineas and Ferb: Ride Again	Nintendo DS
Phineas and Ferb	Phineas and Ferb: Across the 2nd Dimension	PS3, PSP, Wii, Nintendo DS, Xbox 360
Phineas and Ferb	Phineas and Ferb: Quest for Cool Stuff	DS, 3DS, Wii, Wii U, Xbox 360
Pink Panther	The Pink Panther	Commodore 64
Pink Panther	Pink Goes to Hollywood	Genesis, SNES
Pink Panther	The Pink Panther: Passport to Peril	Windows
Pink Panther	Pink Panther: Pinkadelic Pursuit	Game Boy Advance, PS1, Windows
Pixar	Toy Story	SNES, Genesis, Game Boy, Windows
Pixar	A Bug's Life	PS1, N64, GBC, Windows
Pixar	Toy Story 2: Buzz Lightyear to the Rescue	PS1, N64, Dreamcast, Windows, Mac
Pixar	Toy Story 2	Game Boy Color
Pixar	Toy Story Racer	PS1, GBC
Pixar	Monsters, Inc.	PS2, GBC, Game Boy Advance
Pixar	Monsters, Inc. Scream Team	PS1, PS2, Windows
Pixar	Monsters, Inc. Scream Arena	GameCube
Pixar	Finding Nemo	PS2, GameCube, Game Boy Advance, Xbox, Windows, Mac
Pixar	The Incredibles	PS2, GameCube, GBA, Xbox, Windows, Mac
Pixar	The Incredibles: Rise of the Underminer	PS2, GameCube, GBA, Xbox, DS, Windows, Mac
Pixar	Cars	PS2, PSP, GameCube, Wii, GBA, DS, Xbox, Xbox 360, Windows
Pixar	Cars: Radiator Springs Adventures	Windows, Mac
Pixar	Ratatouille	PS2, PS3, PSP, GameCube, Wii, Game Boy Advance, DS, Xbox, Xbox 360, Windows, Mac
Pixar	Ratatouille: Food Frenzy	DS
Pixar	Cars Mater-National Championship	PS2, PS3, Wii, Game Boy Advance, DS, Xbox 360, Windows
Pixar	WALL-E	PS2, PS3, PSP, Wii, DS, Xbox 360, Windows, Mac
Pixar	Up	PS2, PS3, PSP, Wii, DS, Xbox 360, Windows, Mac
Pixar	Toy Story Mania	PS3, Wii, Xbox 360, Windows, iOS
Pixar	Cars Race-O-Rama	PS2, PS3, PlayStation Portable, Wii, DS, Xbox 360
Pixar	Toy Story 3	PS2, PS3, PSP, Wii, DS, Xbox 360, Windows, Mac, iOS
Pixar	The World of Cars Online	Windows, Mac
Pixar	Cars 2	PS3, PSP, Wii, DS, 3DS, Xbox 360, Windows, Mac, iOS
Pixar	Brave	PS3, Wii, DS, Xbox 360, Windows, Mac
Pixar	Rush: A Disney–Pixar Adventure	Xbox 360, Xbox One, Windows
Pixar	Cars 3: Driven to Win	PS3, PS4, Wii U, Switch, Xbox 360, Xbox One
Pixar	Lego The Incredibles	PS4, Switch, Xbox One, Windows, Mac
Popeye	Popeye	Arcade, Atari 2600, Atari 5200, Atari 8-bit, ColecoVision, C64, Odyssey², Intellivision, NES, TI-99/4A
The Powerpuff Girls	The Powerpuff Girls: Bad Mojo Jojo	Game Boy Color
The Powerpuff Girls	The Powerpuff Girls: Paint the Townsville Green	Game Boy Color
The Powerpuff Girls	The Powerpuff Girls: Chemical X-traction	N64, PS1
The Powerpuff Girls	The Powerpuff Girls: Gamesville	Windows
The Powerpuff Girls	The Powerpuff Girls: Battle Him	Game Boy Color
The Powerpuff Girls	The Powerpuff Girls: Mojo Jojo A-Go-Go	Game Boy Advance
The Powerpuff Girls	The Powerpuff Girls: Him and Seek	Game Boy Advance
The Powerpuff Girls	The Powerpuff Girls: Relish Rampage	PS2, GameCube
The Powerpuff Girls	The Powerpuff Girls Learning Challenge: Mojo Jojo's Clone Zone	Mac, Windows
The Powerpuff Girls	The Powerpuff Girls Learning Challenge 2: Princess Snorebucks	Mac, Windows
The Powerpuff Girls	The Powerpuff Girls: Mojo Jojo's Pet Project	Mac, Windows
The Powerpuff Girls	The Powerpuff Girls: Defenders of Townsville	Mac, Windows
Regular Show	Regular Show: Mordecai and Rigby in 8-Bit Land	3DS
Road Runner	Road Runner	Arcade, Atari 2600, NES
Road Runner	Road Runner's Death Valley Rally	SNES
Road Runner	Desert Speedtrap	Game Gear, Master System
Road Runner	Desert Demolition	Genesis
Rocket Power	Rocket Power: Gettin' Air	Game Boy Color
Rocket Power	Rocket Power: Team Rocket Rescue	PlayStation
Rocket Power	Rocket Power: Dream Scheme	Game Boy Advance
Rocket Power	Rocket Power: Beach Bandits	GBA, GameCube, PS2
Rocket Power	Rocket Power: Zero Gravity Zone	Game Boy Advance
Rocket Power	Rocket Power: Extreme Arcade Games	PC
Rocko's Modern Life	Rocko's Modern Life: Spunky's Dangerous Day	SNES
Rugrats	Rugrats Adventure Game	PC
Rugrats	Rugrats: Search for Reptar	PlayStation
Rugrats	The Rugrats Movie	Game Boy, GBC
Rugrats	The Rugrats Movie: Activity Challenge	PC
Rugrats	Rugrats: Scavenger Hunt	Nintendo 64
Rugrats	Rugrats Mystery Adventures	PC
Rugrats	Rugrats: Studio Tour	PlayStation
Rugrats	Rugrats: Time Travelers	Game Boy Color
Rugrats	Rugrats in Paris	GBC, Nintendo 64, PlayStation, PC,
Rugrats	Rugrats: Totally Angelica	PlayStation, GBC
Rugrats	Rugrats: All Growed-Up	PC
Rugrats	Rugrats: Castle Capers	Game Boy Advance
Rugrats	Rugrats: Totally Angelica Boredom Buster	PC
Rugrats	Rugrats: I Gotta Go Party	Game Boy Advance
Rugrats	Rugrats: Royal Ransom	GameCube, PS2
Rugrats	Rugrats Go Wild	Game Boy Advance, PC
Rugrats	All Grown Up!: Express Yourself	Game Boy Advance
Rugrats	Rugrats Food Fight	Mobile
Samurai Jack	Samurai Jack	GBC
Samurai Jack	Samurai Jack: Samurai Showdown	Mobile phone
Samurai Jack	Samurai Jack: The Amulet of Time	Game Boy Advance
Samurai Jack	Samurai Jack: The Shadow of Aku	PS2, GameCube
Samurai Jack	Samurai Jack: Battle Through Time	Windows, PS4, Xbox One, Switch, macOS, iOS
Scooby-Doo	Scooby-Doo! Classic Creep Capers	Game Boy Color, Nintendo 64
Scooby-Doo	Scooby-Doo Mystery	Mega Drive/Genesis, SNES
Scooby-Doo	Scooby-Doo! Mystery of the Fun Park Phantom	PC
Scooby-Doo	Scooby-Doo! Night of 100 Frights	GameCube, PS2, Xbox
Scooby-Doo	Scooby-Doo! Mystery Mayhem	GBA, GameCube, PS2, Xbox
Scooby-Doo	Scooby-Doo and the Cyber Chase	PlayStation, GBA
Scooby-Doo	Scooby-Doo! Unmasked	GBA, GameCube, Nintendo DS, PS2, Xbox
Scooby-Doo	Scooby-Doo! Who's Watching Who?	Nintendo DS, PSP
Scooby-Doo	Scooby-Doo's Maze Chase	Intellivision
Scooby-Doo	Scooby-Doo in the Castle Mystery	ZX Spectrum, Amstrad CPC, Commodore 64, Commodore Plus/4
Scooby-Doo	Scooby-Doo and Scrappy Doo	Amiga, Amstrad CPC, Atari ST, Commodore 64, ZX Spectrum
Scooby-Doo	Scooby-Doo! Jinx at the Sphinx	PC
Scooby-Doo	Scooby-Doo! Phantom of the Knight	PC
Scooby-Doo	Scooby-Doo! Showdown in Ghost Town	PC
Scooby-Doo	Scooby-Doo! First Frights	Windows, Nintendo DS, Wii, PS2
Scooby-Doo	Scooby-Doo! and the Spooky Swamp	Windows, Nintendo DS, Wii, PS2
Scooby-Doo	Scooby-Doo: The Movie	GBA
Scooby-Doo	Scooby-Doo 2: Monsters Unleashed	PC
Scooby-Doo	Scooby-Doo! Case File #1: The Glowing Bug Man	PC
Scooby-Doo	Scooby-Doo! Case File #2: The Scary Stone Dragon	PC
Scooby-Doo	Scooby-Doo! Case File #3: Frights! Camera! Frights!	PC
Scooby-Doo	Scooby-Doo & Looney Tunes Cartoon Universe: Adventure	Nintendo 3DS, PC
Shaun the Sheep	Shaun the Sheep	Nintendo DS
Shaun the Sheep	Shaun the Sheep: Off His Head	Nintendo DS
Shrek	Shrek	Xbox, GameCube
Shrek	Shrek: Fairy Tale Freakdown	Game Boy Color
Shrek	Shrek Game Land Activity Center	Windows
Shrek	Shrek: Hassle at the Castle	Game Boy Advance
Shrek	Shrek: Swamp Fun with Phonics	Windows
Shrek	Shrek: Swamp Fun with Early Math	Windows
Shrek	Shrek: Swamp Kart Speedway	Game Boy Advance
Shrek	Shrek: Treasure Hunt	PlayStation
Shrek	Shrek Super Party	Xbox, GameCube, and PS2
Shrek	Shrek: Reekin' Havoc	Game Boy Advance
Shrek	Shrek 2	GameCube, PS2, Xbox, Windows, Game Boy Advance, Mobile
Shrek	Shrek 2 Activity Center: Twisted Fairy Tale Fun	Windows
Shrek	Shrek 2: Ogre Bowler	Windows
Shrek	Shrek 2: Team Action	Windows
Shrek	Shrek 2: Beg for Mercy	Game Boy Advance
Shrek	Shrek 2: Trivia	Mobile
Shrek	Shrek 2: Castle Run	Mobile
Shrek	Shrek 2: The Adventure of Puss in Boots	Windows
Shrek	Shrek SuperSlam	PS2, Xbox, GameCube, Windows, Nintendo DS, Game Boy Advance
Shrek	Shrek: Fiona's Rescue	Sky Gamestar
Shrek	Shrek: Disarming Charming	Sky Gamestar
Shrek	Shrek: Fairy Godmother's Revenge	Sky Gamestar
Shrek	Shrek Smash n' Crash Racing	GameCube, PS2, PSP, Nintendo DS, Game Boy Advance
Shrek	Shrek: Double Trouble	Sky Gamestar
Shrek	Shrek: Imperial Peril	Sky Gamestar
Shrek	Shrek the Third	Xbox 360, Windows, Wii, PS2, PSP, Game Boy Advance, Nintendo DS, Sky Gamestar, Mobile
Shrek	Shrek Jumble Rumble	Sky Gamestar
Shrek	Shrek n' Roll	Xbox Live Arcade
Shrek	Shrek: Ogres & Dronkeys	Nintendo DS
Shrek	Shrek's Carnival Craze	PS2, Windows, Wii, Nintendo DS
Shrek	Shrek Party	Mobile
Shrek	Shrek Kart	Mobile
Shrek	Shrek Forever After	Xbox 360, Windows, Wii, PlayStation 3, Nintendo DS, Sky Gamestar, Mobile
Shrek	Puss in Boots	Xbox 360, Wii, PS3, Nintendo DS
Shrek	DreamWorks Super Star Kartz	Xbox 360, Wii, PS3, Nintendo DS, Nintendo 3DS
Shrek	Fruit Ninja: Puss in Boots	Mobile
Shrek	Shrek's Fairytale Kingdom	Mobile
Shrek	Shrek Alarm	Mobile
Shrek	Pocket Shrek	Mobile
Shrek	Shrek Sugar Fever	Mobile
Shrek	DreamWorks All-Star Kart Racing	PS5, Xbox Series S/X, Nintendo Switch, PS4, Xbox One, Windows PC
Skeleton Warriors	Skeleton Warriors	Saturn, PlayStation
South Park	South Park	Nintendo 64, PC, PlayStation
South Park	South Park: Chef's Luv Shack	Dreamcast, Nintendo 64, PC, PlayStation
South Park	South Park Rally	Dreamcast, Nintendo 64, PC, PlayStation
South Park	South Park Let's Go Tower Defense Play!	Xbox Live Arcade
South Park	South Park: Tenorman's Revenge	Xbox Live Arcade
South Park	South Park: The Stick of Truth	PS3, Xbox 360, Windows
South Park	South Park: The Fractured but Whole	PS4, Xbox One, Windows, Switch
South Park	South Park: Snow Day!	PS5, Xbox Series X/S, Windows, Switch
Space Goofs	Stupid Invaders	PC, Dreamcast
Speedy Gonzales	Speedy Gonzales	Game Boy
Speedy Gonzales	Speedy Gonzales: Los Gatos Bandidos	SNES
Speedy Gonzales	Speedy Gonzales: Aztec Adventure	Game Boy Color
SpongeBob SquarePants	SpongeBob SquarePants: Legend of the Lost Spatula	Game Boy Color
SpongeBob SquarePants	SpongeBob SquarePants: Operation Krabby Patty	PC
SpongeBob SquarePants	SpongeBob SquarePants: SuperSponge	Game Boy Advance, PlayStation
SpongeBob SquarePants	SpongeBob SquarePants: Employee of the Month	PC
SpongeBob SquarePants	SpongeBob SquarePants: Revenge of the Flying Dutchman	GBA, GameCube, PS2
SpongeBob SquarePants	SpongeBob SquarePants Bowling	Mobile
SpongeBob SquarePants	SpongeBob SquarePants Darts	Mobile, PC
SpongeBob SquarePants	SpongeBob SquarePants: Battle for Bikini Bottom	GBA, GameCube, PC, PS2, Xbox
SpongeBob SquarePants	SpongeBob SquarePants: Krusty Kollection	PC
SpongeBob SquarePants	The SpongeBob SquarePants Movie	GBA, GameCube, Mobile, PC, PS2, Xbox
SpongeBob SquarePants	SpongeBob SquarePants: Lights, Camera, Pants!	Nintendo DS, GBA, GameCube, PC, PS2, Xbox
SpongeBob SquarePants	SpongeBob SquarePants: The Yellow Avenger	Nintendo DS, PSP
SpongeBob SquarePants	SpongeBob SquarePants: Creature from the Krusty Krab	GBA, GameCube, NDS, PC, PS2, Wii
SpongeBob SquarePants	SpongeBob SquarePants: Nighty Nightmare	PC
SpongeBob SquarePants	SpongeBob's Atlantis SquarePantis	Wii, Nintendo DS, GBA, PS2
SpongeBob SquarePants	Drawn to Life: SpongeBob SquarePants Edition	Nintendo DS
SpongeBob SquarePants	SpongeBob's Truth or Square	Wii, Nintendo DS, PSP, Xbox 360
SpongeBob SquarePants	SpongeBob's Boating Bash	Wii, Nintendo DS
SpongeBob SquarePants	SpongeBob vs. The Big One: Beach Party Cook-Off	Nintendo DS
SpongeBob SquarePants	SpongeBob SquigglePants	Wii, Nintendo 3DS
SpongeBob SquarePants	SpongeBob's Surf & Skate Roadtrip	Nintendo DS, Xbox 360
SpongeBob SquarePants	SpongeBob SquarePants: Plankton's Robotic Revenge	Wii, Wii U, PS3, Xbox 360, Nintendo DS, Nintendo 3DS
SpongeBob SquarePants	SpongeBob HeroPants	Nintendo 3DS, PS Vita, Xbox 360
SpongeBob SquarePants	SpongeBob SquarePants: Battle for Bikini Bottom – Rehydrated	Switch, PS4, Xbox One, PC
SpongeBob SquarePants	SpongeBob SquarePants: The Cosmic Shake	Switch, PS4, Windows, Xbox One, PS5, Xbox Series X/S
SpongeBob SquarePants	SpongeBob SquarePants: The Patrick Star Game	Switch, PS4, Windows, PS5, Xbox One, Xbox Series X/S
SpongeBob SquarePants	SpongeBob SquarePants: Titans of the Tide	Switch, Windows, PS5, Xbox Series X/S
Star Wars: The Clone Wars	Star Wars: The Clone Wars – Lightsaber Duels	Wii
Star Wars: The Clone Wars	Star Wars: The Clone Wars – Jedi Alliance	Nintendo DS
Star Wars: The Clone Wars	Star Wars: The Clone Wars – Republic Heroes	Windows, Xbox 360, PS2, PS3, PSP, Wii, Nintendo DS
Star Wars: The Clone Wars	Lego Star Wars III: The Clone Wars	Windows, Nintendo DS, Nintendo 3DS, MacOS, PS3, PSP, Wii, Xbox 360
Steven Universe	Steven Universe: Attack the Light	Mobile
Steven Universe	Steven Universe: Save the Light	Xbox One, Windows, PS4, Switch
Steven Universe	Steven Universe: Unleash the Light	Apple Arcade, Xbox One, Xbox Series X/S, PS4, Switch, Steam
Super Duper Sumos	Super Duper Sumos	GBA
SWAT Kats: The Radical Squadron	SWAT Kats: The Radical Squadron	SNES
Sylvester & Tweety	Sylvester and Tweety in Cagey Capers	Genesis
Sylvester & Tweety	Looney Tunes: Twouble!	Game Boy Color
Sylvester & Tweety	Tweety's High-Flying Adventure	Game Boy Color
Sylvester & Tweety	Tweety and the Magic Gems	Game Boy Advance
TaleSpin	TaleSpin	Game Boy, Mega Drive/Genesis, NES, TurboGrafx-16
Tasmanian Devil	Taz-Mania	Game Boy, Game Gear, Master System, Genesis, SNES
Tasmanian Devil	Taz in Escape from Mars	Game Gear, Master System (Brazil/Portugal only), Mega Drive/Genesis
Tasmanian Devil	Tasmanian Devil: Munching Madness	Game Boy Color
Tasmanian Devil	Taz Express	Nintendo 64
Tasmanian Devil	Taz: Wanted	PS2, GameCube, Xbox, PC
Teen Titans	Teen Titans 2005	GBA
Teen Titans	Teen Titans 2 - The Brotherhood's Revenge	GBA
Teen Titans	Teen Titans 2006	PS2, GameCube, Xbox
The Addams Family Animated Series	The Addams Family: Pugsley's Scavenger Hunt	Game Boy, NES, SNES
The Addams Family Animated Series	The New Addams Family Series	GBC
The Adventures of Jimmy Neutron: Boy Genius	Jimmy Neutron: Boy Genius	GBA, GameCube, PS2, Windows
The Adventures of Jimmy Neutron: Boy Genius	Jimmy Neutron vs. Jimmy Negatron	Game Boy Advance, Windows
The Adventures of Jimmy Neutron: Boy Genius	The Adventures of Jimmy Neutron Boy Genius: Jet Fusion	GBA, GameCube, PS2
The Adventures of Jimmy Neutron: Boy Genius	The Adventures of Jimmy Neutron Boy Genius: Attack of the Twonkies	GBA, GameCube, PS2
The Fairly OddParents	The Fairly OddParents: Enter the Cleft	Game Boy Advance
The Fairly OddParents	The Fairly OddParents: Breakin' da Rules	Windows, GBA, GameCube, PS2, Xbox
The Fairly OddParents	The Fairly OddParents: Shadow Showdown	Windows, GameCube, PS2, GBA
The Fairly OddParents	The Fairly OddParents: Clash with the Anti-World	Game Boy Advance
The Flintstones	The Flintstones: Surprise at Dinosaur Peak	NES
The Flintstones	The Flintstones: Bedrock Bowling	PlayStation
The Flintstones	The Flintstones: The Treasure of Sierra Madrock	Super NES
The Flintstones	Yabba Dabba Doo!	ZX Spectrum, Commodore 64, Amstrad CPC
The Flintstones	The Flintstones (1988)	Amiga, Amstrad CPC, Atari ST, C64, Master System, MSX, ZX Spectrum
The Flintstones	The Flintstones: Dino: Lost in Bedrock	MS-DOS
The Flintstones	The Flintstones: The Rescue of Dino & Hoppy	NES
The Flintstones	The Flintstones: King Rock Treasure Island	GBA
The Flintstones	The Flintstones (1993)	Mega Drive/Genesis
The Flintstones	Flintstones/Jetsons: Time Warp	CD-i
The Flintstones	Fred Flintstone's Memory Match	Arcade
The Flintstones	The Flintstones (1994)	SNES, Game Boy, Sega Channel
The Flintstones	The Flintstones: BurgerTime in Bedrock	Game Boy Color
The Flintstones	The Flintstones: Big Trouble in Bedrock	Game Boy Advance
The Flintstones	The Flintstones in Viva Rock Vegas	PS2
The Flintstones	The Flintstones: Bedrock Racing	PS2
The Garfield Show	The Garfield Show: Threat of the Space Lasagna	Wii, Nintendo DS, Windows
The Grim Adventures of Billy & Mandy	The Grim Adventures of Billy & Mandy	Wii, PS2, GBA, GameCube
The Jetsons	The Jetsons: Invasion of the Planet Pirates	SNES
The Jetsons	The Jetsons: Cogswell's Caper!	NES
The Jetsons	The Jetsons' Ways With Words	Intellivision
The Jetsons	The Jetsons: George Jetson and the Legend of Robotopia	Amiga
The Jetsons	The Jetsons in Mealtime Malfunction	PC
The Jetsons	The Jetsons: By George, in Trouble Again	MS-DOS
The Jetsons	Jetsons: The Computer Game	Amiga, Amstrad CPC, Atari ST, Commodore 64, MS-DOS, ZX Spectrum
The Jetsons	The Jetsons: Robot Panic	Game Boy
The Legend of Korra	The Legend of Korra	Xbox 360, Xbox One, PS3, PS4, Windows
The Legend of Korra	The Legend of Korra: A New Era Begins	Nintendo 3DS
The Lion King	The Lion King	Sega Genesis, SNES, MS-DOS, Game Boy, Amiga, NES, Game Gear, Master System
The Lion King	The Lion King: Simba's Mighty Adventure	PlayStation, Game Boy Color
The Lion King	Timon & Pumbaa's Jungle Games	PC, SNES
The Lion King	The Lion King: Operation Pridelands	Leapster
The Lion King	The Lion King 1½	Game Boy Advance
The Lion King	Disney Classic Games: Aladdin and The Lion King	Nintendo Switch, PlayStation 4, Xbox One, PC
The Legend of Tarzan	Tarzan: Return to the Jungle	Game Boy Advance
The Penguins of Madagascar	The Penguins of Madagascar	Nintendo DS
The Penguins of Madagascar	The Penguins of Madagascar: Dr. Blowhole Returns – Again!	Nintendo DS, PlayStation 3, Wii, Xbox 360
The Pirates of Dark Water	The Pirates of Dark Water	Genesis, SNES
The Proud Family	The Proud Family	Game Boy Advance
The Real Ghostbusters	The Real Ghostbusters	Arcade
The Ren and Stimpy Show	The Ren & Stimpy Show: Space Cadet Adventures	Game Boy
The Ren and Stimpy Show	The Ren & Stimpy Show: Stimpy's Invention	Genesis
The Ren and Stimpy Show	The Ren & Stimpy Show: Veediots!	Game Boy, SNES
The Ren and Stimpy Show	The Ren & Stimpy Show: Buckaroo$	NES, SNES
The Ren and Stimpy Show	The Ren & Stimpy Show: Quest for the Shaven Yak	Game Gear
The Ren and Stimpy Show	The Ren & Stimpy Show: Fire Dogs	SNES
The Ren and Stimpy Show	The Ren & Stimpy Show: Time Warp	SNES
The Rocky and Bullwinkle Show	Rocky and Bullwinkle & Friends	Game Boy, Genesis, SNES, NES
The Secret Saturdays	The Secret Saturdays: Beasts of the 5th Sun	Nintendo DS, Wii, PS2, PSP
The Simpsons	The Simpsons	Arcade
The Simpsons	The Simpsons: Bart's House of Weirdness	PC
The Simpsons	The Simpsons: Bart vs. the Space Mutants	Amiga, Game Gear, Genesis, NES, PC, Amstrad CPC, Atari ST, C64, ZX Spectrum
The Simpsons	The Simpsons: Bart vs. the World	Amiga, Game Gear, Master System, NES
The Simpsons	Bart Simpson's Escape from Camp Deadly	Game Boy
The Simpsons	The Simpsons: Bart vs. The Juggernauts	Game Boy
The Simpsons	The Simpsons: Bart's Nightmare	Genesis, SNES
The Simpsons	The Simpsons: Bartman Meets Radioactive Man	Game Gear, NES
The Simpsons	Krusty's Fun House	Game Boy, Game Gear, Genesis, NES, SNES (as Krusty's Super Fun House)
The Simpsons	The Simpsons: Bart & the Beanstalk	Game Boy
The Simpsons	Virtual Bart	Genesis, SNES
The Simpsons	The Itchy & Scratchy Game	Game Gear, Genesis, SNES
The Simpsons	Itchy and Scratchy in Miniature Golf Madness	Game Boy
The Simpsons	The Simpsons: Virtual Springfield	PC
The Simpsons	The Simpsons: Night of the Living Treehouse of Horror	Game Boy Color
The Simpsons	The Simpsons Wrestling	PlayStation
The Simpsons	The Simpsons: Road Rage	GameCube, PS2, Xbox
The Simpsons	The Simpsons Skateboarding	PS2
The Simpsons	The Simpsons: Road Rage	GBA
The Simpsons	The Simpsons: Hit & Run	GameCube, PC, PS2, Xbox
The Simpsons	The Simpsons Game	Nintendo DS, PS2, PS3, PSP, Wii, Xbox 360
The Smurfs	Revenge Of The Smurfs	Game Boy Advance
The Smurfs	Smurf: Rescue in Gargamel's Castle	Atari 2600, ColecoVision
The Smurfs	Smurfs Save the Day	Atari 2600
The Smurfs	Smurf: Paint 'n' Play Workshop	ColecoVision
The Smurfs	The Smurfs	Game Boy, Game Gear, Master System, Mega CD, Genesis, NES, SNES, Windows
The Smurfs	The Smurfs	Genesis, SNES
The Smurfs	The Smurfs Travel the World	Genesis, SNES
The Smurfs	The Smurfs	PlayStation
The Smurfs	Smurfs Nightmare	Game Boy Color
The Smurfs	Smurf Racer	PlayStation, Windows
The Super Hero Squad Show	Marvel Super Hero Squad	Wii, Nintendo DS, PS2, PSP
The Wild Thornberrys	The Wild Thornberrys: Animal Adventures	PlayStation
The Wild Thornberrys	The Wild Thornberrys: Rambler	Game Boy Color, Windows
The Wild Thornberrys	The Wild Thornberrys: Chimp Chase	Game Boy Advance
The Wild Thornberrys	The Wild Thornberrys Movie	Game Boy Advance, PC
ThunderCats	ThunderCats: The Lost Eye of Thundera	Commodore 64, PC, ZX Spectrum
ThunderCats	ThunderCats (2011) Series (Nintendo DS game)	Nintendo DS
Tiny Toon Adventures
Tiny Toon Adventures	Tiny Toon Adventures	NES
Tiny Toon Adventures	Tiny Toon Adventures Cartoon Workshop	NES
Tiny Toon Adventures	Tiny Toon Adventures: Babs' Big Break	Game Boy
Tiny Toon Adventures	Tiny Toon Adventures 2: Trouble in Wackyland	NES
Tiny Toon Adventures	Tiny Toon Adventures 2: Montana's Movie Madness	Game Boy
Tiny Toon Adventures	Tiny Toon Adventures: Buster's Hidden Treasure	Genesis
Tiny Toon Adventures	Tiny Toon Adventures: Buster Busts Loose	SNES
Tiny Toon Adventures	Tiny Toon Adventures: Wacky Sports Challenge	SNES
Tiny Toon Adventures	Tiny Toon Adventures: Wacky Sports Challenge	Game Boy
Tiny Toon Adventures	Tiny Toon Adventures: ACME All-Stars	Genesis
Tiny Toon Adventures	Tiny Toon Adventures: Buster and the Beanstalk	PC
Tiny Toon Adventures	Tiny Toon Adventures: The Great Beanstalk	PlayStation
Tiny Toon Adventures	Tiny Toon Adventures: Toonenstein	PlayStation
Tiny Toon Adventures	Tiny Toon Adventures: Plucky's Big Adventure	PlayStation
Tiny Toon Adventures	Tiny Toon Adventures: Buster Saves the Day	Game Boy Color
Tiny Toon Adventures	Tiny Toon Adventures: Dizzy's Candy Quest	Game Boy Color
Tiny Toon Adventures	Tiny Toon Adventures: Wacky Stackers	Game Boy Advance
Tiny Toon Adventures	Tiny Toon Adventures: Buster's Bad Dream	Game Boy Advance
Tiny Toon Adventures	Tiny Toon Adventures: Defenders of the Looniverse	PlayStation 2 (unreleased)
Tom and Jerry	Tom & Jerry and Tuffy	NES, MS-DOS
Tom and Jerry	Tom and Jerry	Game Boy
Tom and Jerry	Tom and Jerry	SNES
Tom and Jerry	Tom & Jerry: Hunting High and Low	Amiga, Amstrad CPC, Atari ST, Commodore 64
Tom and Jerry	Tom and Jerry Tales	Nintendo DS, GBA
Tom and Jerry	Tom & Jerry: Frantic Antics	Game Boy, Genesis
Tom and Jerry	Tom and Jerry: Infurnal Escape	Game Boy Advance
Tom and Jerry	Tom and Jerry: The Magic Ring	Game Boy Advance
Tom and Jerry	Tom and Jerry in House Trap	Game Boy Color, PS
Tom and Jerry	Tom and Jerry in Mouse Attacks	Game Boy Color
Tom and Jerry	Tom and Jerry: Mouse Hunt	Game Boy Color
Tom and Jerry	Tom and Jerry: War of the Whiskers	GameCube, PS2, Xbox
Tom and Jerry	Tom and Jerry: The Movie	Game Gear, Master System
Tom and Jerry	Tom and Jerry Cheese Chase	Mobile
Tom and Jerry	Tom and Jerry Food Fight	Mobile
Tom and Jerry	Tom & Jerry in Fists of Furry	Nintendo 64, Windows
Tom and Jerry	Tom and Jerry Pinball Pursuit	Mobile phone
Totally Spies!	Totally Spies!	Game Boy Advance
Totally Spies!	Totally Spies! 2: Undercover	Game Boy Advance, Nintendo DS
Totally Spies!	Totally Spies! Totally Party	PC, Wii, PS2
Toxic Crusaders	Toxic Crusaders	Game Boy, Genesis, NES
Transformers	The Transfomers	Commodore 64, ZX Spectrum
Transformers	Transformers: The Battle to Save the Earth	Commodore 64
Transformers	The Headmasters	Famicom Disk System
Transformers	Beast Wars: Transformers	PC, PlayStation
Transformers	Transformers: Mystery Of Convoy	NES
Transformers	Transformers: Beast Wars Transmetals	Nintendo 64, PlayStation
Transformers	Transformers	PS2
Transformers	Transformers	PS2
Wallace & Gromit	Wallace & Gromit in Project Zoo	GameCube, PS2, Xbox
Wallace & Gromit	Wallace & Gromit: The Curse of the Were-Rabbit	PS2, Xbox
Wallace & Gromit	Wallace & Gromit's Grand Adventures	Windows, Xbox 360, iOS
Well, Just You Wait!	Hase und Wolf	Arcade (Poly-Play)
Widget the World Watcher	Widget	NES
Widget the World Watcher	Super Widget	SNES
W.I.T.C.H.	W.I.T.C.H.	GBA
Woody Woodpecker	Woody Woodpecker's Frustrated Vacations (Brazil only)	Master System, Mega Drive/Genesis
Woody Woodpecker	Woody Woodpecker in Crazy Castle 5	GBA
Woody Woodpecker	Woody Woodpecker Racing	GBC, PC, PlayStation
Woody Woodpecker	Woody Woodpecker: Escape from Buzz Buzzard Park	PS2, GBC, Microsoft Windows
Xiaolin Showdown	Xiaolin Showdown	PS2, Xbox, PSP, Nintendo DS
Yogi Bear	Yogi's Frustration	Intellivision
Yogi Bear	Yogi Bear (1987)	Amstrad CPC, Commodore 64, ZX Spectrum
Yogi Bear	Yogi Bear & Friends in The Greed Monster	ZX Spectrum, Amstrad CPC, Commodore 64, Atari 8-bit, Amiga
Yogi Bear	Yogi Bear's Math Adventures	MS-DOS
Yogi Bear	Yogi's Great Escape	Commodore 64, Amstrad CPC, Atari 8-bit, Atari ST, Amiga
Yogi Bear	Yo Yogi Bear	Tiger Handheld
Yogi Bear	Yogi's Big Clean Up	Amiga, Atari ST, Commodore 64
Yogi Bear	Adventures of Yogi Bear	SNES, Genesis
Yogi Bear	Yogi Bear's Gold Rush	Game Boy
Yogi Bear	Yogi Bear: Great Balloon Blast	GBC
Yogi Bear	Yogi Bear: The Video Game	Wii, Nintendo DS
Young Justice	Young Justice: Legacy	Windows, Xbox 360, PS3, Nintendo 3DS

== See also ==
- List of video games based on films
- List of video games based on anime or manga
- List of video games based on comics
- List of Disney video games
- List of Looney Tunes video games
- List of Hanna-Barbera-based video games
- List of Teenage Mutant Ninja Turtles video games
- List of The Simpsons video games
- SpongeBob SquarePants video games
- List of The Smurfs video games
- List of Tom and Jerry video games
- List of animated television series
