= List of Looney Tunes video games =

Since 1979, the Looney Tunes franchise has spawned several video games.

== Bugs Bunny series ==
Title	Publisher	Release Year	System(s)
Bugs Bunny	Atari	1983	Atari 2600
The Bugs Bunny Crazy Castle	Kemco	1989	Game Boy; NES
Bugs Bunny	Tiger Electronics	1990	Handheld
The Bugs Bunny Birthday Blowout	Kemco	1990	NES
The Bugs Bunny Hare-Brained Adventure	Hi Tech Expressions	1990	MS-DOS
Bugs Bunny's Birthday Ball	Bally	1991	Pinball
The Bugs Bunny Crazy Castle 2	Kemco	1991	Game Boy
Bugs Bunny Rabbit Rampage	Sunsoft	1994	Super NES
Bugs Bunny in Double Trouble	Sega	1996	Game Gear; Sega Genesis
Bugs Bunny & Lola Bunny: Operation Carrot Patch (PAL); Looney Tunes: Carrot Crazy (NTSC)	Infogrames	1998	Game Boy Color
Bugs Bunny: Lost in Time	Infogrames	1999	Windows; PlayStation
Bugs Bunny: Crazy Castle 3	Kemco	1999	Game Boy Color
Bugs Bunny in Crazy Castle 4	Kemco	2000	Game Boy Color
Bugs Bunny & Taz: Time Busters	Infogrames	2000	Windows; PlayStation

== Daffy Duck series ==
Title	Publisher	Release Year	System(s)
Daffy Duck, P.I.: The Case of the Missing Letters	Hi Tech Expressions	1991	MS-DOS
Daffy Duck: The Marvin Missions	Sunsoft	1993	Game Boy; Super NES
Daffy Duck in Hollywood	Sega	1995	Game Gear (Europe Only); Sega Genesis (Europe Only); Master System (Europe Only)
Daffy Duck: Fowl Play	Sunsoft	1999	Game Boy Color
Duck Dodgers Starring Daffy Duck	Infogrames	2000	Nintendo 64
Looney Tunes: Duck Amuck	Warner Bros. Interactive Entertainment	2007	Nintendo DS
Behold the Wizard	Cartoon Network	2014	Browser

== Tasmanian Devil series ==
Title	Publisher	Release Year	System(s)
Taz	Atari	1983	Atari 2600
Taz-Mania	Sega	1992	Game Gear; Sega Genesis; Master System (Europe Only)
Taz-Mania	Sunsoft; THQ (SNES PAL Version)	1993	Game Boy; Super NES
Taz-Mania	Tiger Electronics	1994	Handheld
Taz in Escape from Mars	Sega	1994	Game Gear; Sega Genesis; Master System (Brazil Only)
Taz-Mania 2	THQ	1997	Game Boy
Tasmanian Devil: Munching Madness	Sunsoft	1999	Game Boy Color
Taz Express	Infogrames	2000	Nintendo 64 (Europe Only)
Taz: Wanted	Infogrames	2002	GameCube; Windows; PlayStation 2 Xbox
Galactic Taz Ball	Warner Bros. Interactive Entertainment	2010	Nintendo DS

== Wile E. Coyote and the Road Runner series ==
Title	Publisher	Release Year	System(s)
Road Runner	Atari	1979	Pinball
Road Runner	Atari	1985	Amstrad CPC; Arcade; Atari 2600; Commodore 64; MS-DOS; NES (Note: NES port was released unlicensed by Tengen, while a licensed port by Mindscape went unreleased.); ZX Spectrum
Road Runner	Tiger Electronics	1990	Handheld
Road Runner and Wile E. Coyote	Hi-Tec Software	1991	Amstrad CPC; Commodore 64; ZX Spectrum
Road Runner's Death Valley Rally	Sunsoft	1992	Super NES
Desert Speedtrap Starring Road Runner & Wile E. Coyote	Sega	1993	Game Gear; Master System (Brazil and Europe Only)
Desert Demolition Starring Road Runner and Wile E. Coyote	Sega	1995	Sega Genesis
Looney Tunes Acme Antics	Majesco	2005	Game Boy Advance

== Speedy Gonzales series ==
Title	Publisher	Release Year	System(s)
Speedy Gonzales	Sunsoft	1993	Game Boy
Speedy Gonzales: Los Gatos Bandidos	Acclaim Entertainment	1995	Super NES
Cheese Cat-Astrophe Starring Speedy Gonzales	Sega	1995	Game Gear; Sega Genesis (Europe Only); Master System (Europe Only)
Speedy Gonzales: Aztec Adventure	Sunsoft	1999	Game Boy Color

== Sylvester and Tweety series ==
Title	Publisher	Release Year	System(s)
Sylvester and Tweety in Cagey Capers	Time Warner Interactive	1994	Sega Genesis
Looney Tunes: Twouble! (NTSC); Sylvester & Tweety: Breakfast on the Run (PAL)	Infogrames	1998	Game Boy Color
Tweety's High-Flying Adventure	Kemco	2000	Game Boy Color
Tweety and the Magic Gems	Kemco	2001	Game Boy Advance

== Other games ==
Title	Publisher	Release Year	System(s)
Looney Tunes	Sunsoft	1992	Game Boy
Acme Animation Factory	Sunsoft	1994	Super NES
Looney Tunes Road Rally Riot	Tiger Electronics	1994	Handheld
Looney Tunes B-Ball	Sunsoft	1995	Super NES
Porky Pig's Haunted Holiday	Sunsoft	1995	Super NES
Space Jam	Acclaim Entertainment	1996	MS-DOS; PlayStation; Sega Saturn
Space Jam	Sega	1996	Pinball
Space Jam	Tiger Electronics	1996	Handheld
Home Tweet Home: Interactive Coloring Book	SouthPeak Interactive	1998	Windows
Looney Tunes: Cosmic Capers Animated Jigsaw Puzzle	SouthPeak Interactive	1998	Windows
Looney Tunes	Sunsoft	1999	Game Boy Color
Baby Looney Tunes Carnival	Jaleco	1999	Arcade (medal game)
Looney Tunes: Cosmic Capers	SouthPeak Interactive	1999	Windows
Looney Tunes PhotoFun	MGI Software Corp		Windows
Looney Tunes Racing	Infogrames	2000	Game Boy Color; PlayStation
Looney Tunes: Space Race	Infogrames	2000	Dreamcast; PlayStation 2
Looney Tunes Collector: Alert! (NTSC); Looney Tunes Collector: Martian Alert! (PAL)	Infogrames	2000	Game Boy Color
Looney Tunes Collector: Martian Revenge! (PAL); Looney Tunes: Marvin Strikes Back! (NTSC)	Infogrames	2000	Game Boy Color
Looney Tunes: Sheep Raider (NTSC) Sheep, Dog 'n' Wolf (PAL)	Infogrames	2001	Windows (Europe Only) PlayStation
Loons: The Fight for Fame	Infogrames	2002	Xbox
Looney Tunes: Back in Action	Electronic Arts	2003	PlayStation 2 Game Boy Advance; GameCube
Looney Tunes Dizzy Driving	Majesco	2005	Game Boy Advance
Looney Tunes: Cannonball Follies	Warner Bros. Interactive Entertainment	2005	Mobile phone
Looney Tunes: Acme Arsenal	Warner Bros. Interactive Entertainment	2007	PlayStation 2 Wii; Xbox 360
Looney Tunes: Cartoon Concerto (PAL); Looney Tunes: Cartoon Conductor (NTSC)	Eidos Interactive	2008	Nintendo DS
Looney Tunes: Monster Match	Glu Games Inc.	2009	BlackBerry
Looney Tunes: Click 'N READ Phonics	CNK Digital	2011	Windows
Scooby Doo! & Looney Tunes Cartoon Universe: Adventure	Warner Bros. Interactive Entertainment	2014	Windows; Nintendo 3DS
Looney Tunes Dash	Zynga	2014	Android iOS
Looney Tunes Galactic Sports	Sony Computer Entertainment	2015	PlayStation Vita (Europe Only)
Looney Tunes: World of Mayhem	Scopely	2018	Android iOS
Space Jam: A New Legacy – The Game	Digital Eclipse	2021	Xbox One; Xbox Series X/S
Looney Tunes Pinball	Spooky Pinball	2023	Pinball
MultiVersus	Warner Bros. Games	2024	Windows; PlayStation 4 PlayStation 5 Xbox One; Xbox Series X/S
Looney Tunes: Wacky World of Sports	GameMill Entertainment	2024	Windows; Nintendo Switch; PlayStation 4 PlayStation 5 Xbox One; Xbox Series X/S

== Unreleased and cancelled games ==
Title	Publisher	System(s)
Daffy Duck Starring in the Great Paint Caper	Hi-Tec Software	Commodore 64
Looney Tunes Hotel	Atari	Atari 5200
Sylvester & Tweety	Sunsoft	Super NES
Wile E's Revenge	Sunsoft	Super NES

== See also ==
- List of Tiny Toon Adventures video games
