= List of cancelled Game Boy Color games =

Cancelled Video Games

The Game Boy Color (GBC) is a handheld video game console released by Nintendo in 1998. The color-screened successor to the monochrome Game Boy, first released in 1989, the GBC's time on store shelves was comparatively short, being succeeded by the Game Boy Advance (GBA) in 2001. During this time, several games being developed for the system were cancelled for reasons such as technical limitations, financial difficulties, and the forthcoming release of the GBA, with a number of games being moved to that system instead. Many of these games were not known about in detail or in any capacity until 2020, when ROM images of several game prototypes were leaked onto the internet as part of a larger Nintendo data leak. This list documents games that were confirmed to be announced or in development for the Game Boy Color at some point, but did not end up being released for it in any capacity.

== Games ==
There are currently 78 games on this list. (Note: This number is always up to date by this script.)

List of cancelled Game Boy Color games
Title(s)	Notes/Reasons	Developer	Publisher
40 Winks	A 2D platformer version of 40 Winks (1999) was in development for Game Boy Color. However, just prior to the PlayStation version's release, financial troubles with the game's publisher, GT Interactive, and their subsequent buyout by Infogrames, led to the cancellation of its nearly-finished Nintendo 64 version, while the GBC version was cancelled before ever being publicly announced. This version's existence would remain unknown until 2021, when a prototype was found being sold on eBay. Piko Interactive, who acquired the rights to the property in 2018, have expressed interest in finishing and releasing an aftermarket version of the game, as they did with the N64 version.	Eurocom Entertainment Software	GT Interactive
AMF Xtreme Bowling	A bowling game using the AMF Bowling license was fully completed, even receiving a review in July 2000 from IGN, but ultimately failed to release.	Vicarious Visions	Vatical Entertainment
Austin Powers: Yeah, Baby, Yeah! / Why Make Millions...?	In 1999, Rockstar Games announced four Game Boy Color games based on the Austin Powers films, all of which utilized a "virtual desktop environment" for presentation. Only the first two, Oh, Behave! and Welcome to My Underground Lair! (2000) were released, while the other two, Yeah, Baby, Yeah! and Why Make Millions...? were cancelled. ROMs of both games were later discovered as part of the 2020 Nintendo data leak.	Tarantula Studios	Rockstar Games
Backyard Sports series	A 2000 press release from Humongous Entertainment announced several entries in their Backyard Sports series would be coming to Game Boy Color. Backyard Baseball 2001 and Backyard Football 2001 were slated for release later that year, while Backyard Soccer was planned for a 2001 release. Ultimately, no Backyard Sports games were released for the system, and the series would not come to a Nintendo handheld until the release of Backyard Football (2002) for Game Boy Advance.	Humongous Entertainment	
Banjo-Kazooie: Grunty's Curse	A Banjo-Kazooie spinoff for Game Boy Color entered the planning phase in 1999, intended to be a 2D platformer focused on Banjo dispelling a curse placed on his friends by series antagonist Gruntilda. Production was halted later that year, and development subsequently shifted to the Game Boy Advance, where it was released as Banjo-Kazooie: Grunty's Revenge (2003).	Rare	Nintendo
Billiard Club	A Billiards game for Game Boy Color was demonstrated by Altron at Space World 2000, but never released.	Altron	Altron
Boon Boon Kabun	Biox (formerly Japan System House) sought to port one of their previously developed games, the Sonic the Hedgehog spinoff Tails' Skypatrol (1995), to the Game Boy Color. The port was renamed Boon Boon Kabun, and given new original characters in place of those from the Sonic franchise. While the port was completed, it was ultimately cancelled due to unspecified contractual reasons.	Biox	
Bounced / Rebounced	The puzzle platformer Bounced featured a spherical character that could bounce off other similar characters in order to reach higher areas. An enhanced sequel, Rebounced, was also being developed, though both games were ultimately cancelled alongside many other Karma Studios games for Game Boy Color.	Karma Studios	Project 2
Candy Fluffy	The puzzle game Candy Fluffy tasked players with exploring maze-like levels to find treats to feed a large creature known as Stubby. The game was cancelled after failing to find a publisher.	Lost Boys Games	
Carmageddon TDR 2000	A Game Boy Color version of Carmageddon TDR 2000 (2000), utilizing the same top-down perspective as the GBC version of Carmageddon II: Carpocalypse Now (1999), was demonstrated at E3 2000. While the game was far enough along to receive a review from IGN in December of that year, it was ultimately cancelled for unknown reasons.	Torus Games	Sales Curve
Carnivale	A video game adaption of the Carnivale film was intended for release on Game Boy Color in August 2000. However, the game was ultimately cancelled alongside its Nintendo 64 counterpart.	Vicarious Visions	Vatical Entertainment
Chiisana Kyojin Microman: Uborg Senki 2010	An RPG based on the Chiisana Kyojin Microman anime series was in development for Game Boy Color. However, it failed to materialize.	Media Factory	Takara
Crash Bandicoot: The Huge Adventure	In September 2000, it was announced that an entry in the Crash Bandicoot series, previously exclusive to the PlayStation, would be released for the Game Boy Color and Game Boy Advance. However, only the GBA version was released in 2003.		Vivendi Universal Interactive Publishing
Cybores	The arcade-style shooter Cybores was planned for release in 2000, but was cancelled along with several other Karma Studios Game Boy Color games.	Karma Studios	
Densetsu no Starfy	Early prototyping for the first entry in Tose's The Legendary Starfy series began on the Game Boy in 1995, but was put on hold before being resuming in 1998, moving the project to Game Boy Color. In 1999, the team was asked to shift development once again to the Game Boy Advance, for which it released in 2002.	Tose	Nintendo
Dino Crisis	Two different Dino Crisis games were in development for Game Boy Color. One, developed by M4, was a top-down action game, the engine and gameplay of which would later be reused by the team for Resident Evil Gaiden (2001). The other, developed by Fluid Studios, was a more direct translation of the original Dino Crisis (1999) utilizing fixed camera angles, similar to the unreleased GBC version of Resident Evil (1996). Ultimately, neither game was released in any capacity.	M4 / Fluid Studios	Capcom
Equestriad 2001	A Game Boy Color version of the PlayStation and Windows game Equestriad 2001 was in development, but was never released.	Graphic State	Midas Interactive Entertainment
FGB	The action game FGB featured the player character exploring mazes to find and destroy enemies to escape. The game was unable to find a publisher due to being developed late in the Game Boy Color's life cycle, though the creators publicly released the final build of the game online a few years later.	Plasma Works	
FIFA 2001	A Game Boy Color version of FIFA 2001 (2000) was scheduled to release alongside versions for Windows, PlayStation, and PlayStation 2, but never materialized.		Electronic Arts
Game Boy Bunko: Hajimari no Mori	A remake of the Super Famicom adventure game Famicom Bunko: Hajimari no Mori (1999) was in development for Game Boy Color, but was cancelled without ever being officially announced. A full game ROM was later discovered as part of the 2020 Nintendo data leak.	Nintendo	Nintendo
Game Boy Music	A music game tentatively titled Game Boy Music began development for Game Boy Color. After determining the system did not have sufficient sound quality or buttons needed to properly accommodate the intended gameplay, the team pushed development to the Game Boy Advance, then to the Nintendo DS, where it was released as Daigasso! Band Brothers (2004).	Nintendo	Nintendo
G-Loop	The Marble Madness style puzzle game G-Loop was intended to release in 2000, but was cancelled along with most of Karma Studios' other Game Boy Color games.	Karma Studios	
Gauntlet Legends / Gauntlet Dark Legacy	A Game Boy Color port of Gauntlet Legends (1998) was announced in March 2000. It was later reported that the port would be based on Legends' expanded version, Gauntlet Dark Legacy (2000). Despite nearing completion, the game ran into development issues related to its multiplayer that would have forced it to be delayed into the following year, prompting Midway to cancel the game instead. Matthew Simmonds, the game's composer, shared the Legends port's soundtrack online in 2024.	Climax Studios	Midway Games
GB Rally	Raylight Studios begam developing the top-down racing game GB Rally in 2000. The game was set to feature multiple tracks, customizable vehicles, and multiplayer using the link cable. However, the game failed to find a publisher, and Raylight cancelled the game in favor of working on GB Rally Advance, a similar racing game that instead featured 3D graphics and movement, though this also never saw release.	Raylight Studios	
Gekido	A spinoff of the Gekido series was in development for Game Boy Color in 2000, but was never released. In 2017, developer NAPS team released the game's unfinished prototype onto the internet.	NAPS team	Interplay Entertainment
Gimmick Land	Developed by AlphaDream for release in 2001, Nintendo was impressed by the game and agreed to publish it. However, despite being finished and ready for release, Nintendo asked AlphaDream to port the game to the just-released Game Boy Advance, as they believed it would be better for the game's sales. The game was subsequently moved to GBA and its graphics updated, releasing as Tomato Adventure (2002). A complete ROM of the original Gimmick Land version was later discovered as part of the 2020 Nintendo data leak.	AlphaDream	Nintendo
Global Kumite	The fighting game Global Kumite was scheduled for a 2000 release, but failed to materialize along with most of Karma Studios' other planned Game Boy Color games.	Karma Studios	
Grand Casino	A gambling game for Game Boy Color was demonstrated by Altron at Space World 2000, but never released.	Altron	Altron
High Heat Major League Baseball 2002	Ports for the Game Boy Color and Game Boy Advance were scheduled to release on June 11, 2001, to coincide with the launch of the GBA. However, the GBA port was delayed to September, while the GBC version was cancelled entirely.		The 3DO Company
Infinity	The tactical role-playing game Infinity began development for Game Boy Color in 1999. Following the release of the Game Boy Advance, the developers struggled to find a publisher for the game, leading it to be cancelled in 2002. In 2016, a member of the original development team publicly released the game's source code and an unfinished ROM, and in 2021, members of the original development team formed Incube8 Games and raised money to finish Infinity through a successful Kickstarter campaign. The finished ROM was digitally released in 2025, with physical cartridges and ports for modern platforms scheduled for future release.	Affinix Software	
Iridion	The space shooter Iridion began development on Game Boy Color in 1999. However, in January 2001, developer Shin'en Multimedia announced that they would no longer be releasing any Game Boy Color games, with Iridion shifting to the Game Boy Advance and releasing later that year as Iridion 3D (2001).	Shin'en Multimedia	
Jet Force Gemini	Following the release of Jet Force Gemini (1999), Bits Studios began development of a Game Boy Color version, which utilized an isometric camera angle. Despite reportedly being near completion, the game was never announced or released, though screenshots and footage of a prototype version surfaced in the 2010s.	Bits Studios	Nintendo
Jibaku-kun: Zero no Ki no Kajitsu	An RPG based on the Jibaku-kun manga series was in development for Game Boy Color. However, the game was never released.	Media Factory, Enterbrain	
Katakis 3D	A 3D revival of Katakis (1987) was in development for the Game Boy Color, though this was never released.	Similis Software	
Kirby Family	Kirby Family was a Game Boy Color game that could connect to a compatible Jaguar JN-100 or JN-2000 sewing machine and embroider cloth with a Kirby pattern of choice. The game was shown at Nintendo Space World 2001, but was cancelled presumably due to poor sales of the similar Mario Family. The game was leaked on September 9, 2020, as part of the 2020 Nintendo data leak.	Natsume	Nintendo
Kiss: Psycho Circus: The Nightmare Child	A video game adaptation of the Kiss: Psycho Circus comic book series was announced for release in 2000 on Windows, Dreamcast, PlayStation, and Game Boy Color. However, only the Windows and Dreamcast versions were released.	GOD Games	Rockstar Games
Knights	Knights was a Game Boy Color version of a planned Dreamcast and Windows game of the same name by Digital Infinity, and featured four knights placed in a maze who had to find and defeat one another until only one remained, similar to Bomberman or Gauntlet. The Game Boy Color game was cancelled, while the Dreamcast game underwent heavy changes and was moved to PlayStation 2 before also being cancelled.	Lost Boys Games	
The Legend of Zelda: Mystical Seed of Courage	A planned Game Boy Color remake of The Legend of Zelda (1986) gradually evolved into an original Zelda project, which would be split between a trilogy of games with different mechanics that could share data between one another: Mystical Seed of Power, Mystical Seed of Wisdom, and Mystical Seed of Courage, named for the three parts of the series' Triforce relic. However, time constraints and technical difficulties with implementing connectivity between three games led to Courage being cancelled, with Power and Wisdom being released as Oracle of Seasons and Oracle of Ages (2001).	Flagship	Nintendo
Magi Nation: Keeper's Quest	A puzzle game spin-off of Magi Nation (2001) was planned for release on Game Boy Color. However, the game was cancelled and heavily retooled, eventually releasing for Verizon and Handango cell phones in 2003.	Interactive Imagination	Epoch Co.
Max Steel: Covert Missions	A video game based on the Max Steel animated series was scheduled to release on Dreamcast and Game Boy Color in December 2000. However, only the Dreamcast version was released.	Torus Games	Mattel Interactive
Mission Bravo	A video game based on the Matchbox Mission Bravo toyline was in development for Game Boy Color. Though planned for a Holiday 2000 release, the game failed to materialize.	Mattel Interactive	Mattel Interactive
Moon	While at Iguana Entertainment, game developer Jools Watsham began concepting a 2D shooter game for Game Boy Color. These ideas would continue to be iterated on for several years, culminating in Watsham's new company Renegade Kid releasing the game for the Nintendo DS as Moon (2009).		
Mythri	The role playing game Mythri began development for Game Boy Color at the independent studio Team XKalibur, who sought to create a game inspired by classic Japanese RPGs such as Final Fantasy. After years of development, progress stalled due to being unable to find a publisher to fund development. In 2003, the game was picked up by publisher Variant Entertainment, with plans to move development to Game Boy Advance. However, Variant never ended up providing the necessary funding, forcing the team to cancel the game and split up to work at other studios. Tomm Hulett, one of the game's designers, later released the game's prototype onto the internet in 2016.	Team XKalibur	Variant Interactive
NBA Live 2000	A Game Boy Color version of NBA Live 2000 (1999) was announced alongside the console versions, but was never released.	Handheld Games	THQ
Page Boy	Following the cancellation of WorkBoy, a productivity-related accessory for Game Boy, the device's primary engineer pitched a similar idea to Nintendo in 1999 called the Page Boy, capable of connecting to the internet via radio signals. Using a proprietary piece of Game Boy software, the Page Boy would allow users to perform searches, send messages to other users, and view news, weather, and previews for upcoming games. Nintendo of America expressed interest in the accessory and spent three years in research and development on the device. However, it was determined that it would not be cost-effective for users outside the US to connect to the requisite wireless networks, limiting the device's potential scope, and development was cancelled in 2002.	Wizard	Nintendo
Phoenix Wright: Ace Attorney	The first entry in the Ace Attorney series began development on the Game Boy Color. However, after the development team saw the Game Boy Advance system's screen and early footage of Mega Man Battle Network (2001), director Shu Takumi decided the game would be a better fit for the new system, cancelling the GBC version and releasing on the GBA in 2001.	Capcom	Capcom
Pokémon Picross	A Pokémon themed Picross game for Game Boy Color was advertised in Japanese gaming magazines in 1999, but never saw release, though an unrelated Pokémon Picross game would eventually be released for the Nintendo 3DS in 2015. A fully-complete GBC ROM of Pokémon Picross was discovered as part of the 2020 Nintendo data leak, and later translated into English by fans.	Jupiter Corporation	Nintendo
Radikal Bikers	A Game Boy Color conversion of Radikal Bikers (1998) was in development, but never released. Piko Interactive later acquired the rights to the game and released it as part of a compilation for Evercade in 2023.	Bit Managers	
Resident Evil	A Game Boy Color port of Resident Evil (1996) was announced in September 1999, retaining the 3D movement and mechanics of the original PlayStation version, but was cancelled in March 2000 due to Capcom's dissatisfaction with the game's quality. In 2012, a nearly complete prototype of the game was leaked onto the internet, with a final build later emerging in 2025.	HotGen	Capcom
Re-Volt	A Game Boy Color version of Re-Volt (1999) was in development at Graphic State for six months, but was cancelled shortly before the planned release date.	Graphic State	Acclaim Entertainment
Rhino Rumble Puzzle	A puzzle-platformer spinoff of Rhino Rumble (2002) was announced and received preview coverage, but was not released in any capacity.	Lost Boys Games	Formula Games
Road Runner	At E3 1999, Sunsoft announced five Game Boy Color games based on the Looney Tunes franchise for release that year, including Looney Tunes, Daffy Duck: Fowl Play, Speedy Gonzales: Aztec Adventure, and Tasmanian Devil: Munching Madness. The fifth game, based on the Wile E. Coyote and the Road Runner cartoons, was never released.		Sunsoft
Rumble: The Mad Match	Rumble: The Mad Match was a dodgeball game starring an assortment of fantasy creatures. Though nearly complete, the game failed to find a publisher and was ultimately cancelled.	Protonic Interactive	
Runelords	A role-playing game adaptation of David Farland's The Runelords fantasy novels was in development for Game Boy color. Though it appeared at E3 2000, the game was ultimately cancelled.	Saffire	Kemco
Saffire	Initially beginning development as a Nintendo 64 game, Saffire was an action-adventure game featuring characters from Greek mythology. Alongside the main GameCube and PlayStation 2 versions, the story was set to be expanded through versions for Game Boy Color and Game Boy Advance and a comic miniseries from Image Comics. While the comics launched in April 2000, none of the video games ever saw release.	Saffire	Saffire
San Francisco Rush: Extreme Racing	A port of San Francisco Rush: Extreme Racing (1996) was planned for Game Boy Color, but never saw release.	Digital Eclipse	Midway Games
Sea-Doo Hydrocross	Originally announced for Dreamcast, PlayStation, Nintendo 64, and Game Boy Color, only the PS1 version ever released.	Vicarious Visions	Vatical Entertainment
Section-7	The vertical space shooter Section-7 was nearly complete in late 1999 and was seeking a publisher for distribution. However, the game was never picked up for distribution, and was cancelled along with several other Game Boy Color games from Karma Studios.	Karma Studios	
Smashing Tennis	Smashing Tennis was a tennis game intended to feature a 3D camera perspective. However, it was one of several Game Boy Color games from Karma Studios that failed to release.	Karma Studios	
South Park	A Game Boy Color version of South Park (1998) was announced, but was cancelled and retooled to replace the South Park elements with those of other licenses, releasing in Europe as Maya the Bee & Her Friends (1999) and in North America as Mary-Kate and Ashley: Get A Clue (2000).	Crawfish Interactive	Acclaim Entertainment
Stip	Stip was a 2D platformer intended to utilize a Game Boy Color rumble cartridge. Though announced in late 2000, the game failed to release like many other Game Boy Color games from Karma Studios.	Karma Studios	
Sutte Hakkun GB	A port of Sutte Hakkun (1997) was developed for Game Boy and Game Boy Color, but was cancelled without ever being officially announced. ROMs of these ports would later be discovered as part of the 2020 Nintendo data leak.	Nintendo	Nintendo
Sydney 2000	A video game adaption of the Sydney 2000 Olympic Games was announced for the PlayStation, Dreamcast, Windows, Nintendo 64, and Game Boy Color. The GBC version was cancelled after it had been delayed past the event itself.	Attention to Detail	Eidos Interactive
The Thing	A video game sequel to the 1982 film The Thing was announced in 2000 for multiple platforms, including the Game Boy Color and Game Boy Advance. However, neither portable version was ever released.	Universal Interactive	Konami
Thrasher: Skate and Destroy	A Game Boy Color version of the skateboarding game Thrasher Presents Skate and Destroy (1999) was in development, but was cancelled following a corporate restructuring at its publisher.	Z-Axis	Rockstar Games
The Three Stooges	A port of The Three Stooges (1987) began development for Game Boy Color, but subsequently shifted to Game Boy Advance, releasing in 2002.	Metro3D, Inc.	Cinemaware
Titus Jr.	A spin-off of Titus the Fox (1991), starring a younger version of the character, was previewed in Magazines in 1998, but never saw release.	Genetic Fantasia	Titus Interactive
Towers II: Plight of the Stargazer	A Game Boy Color port of Towers II: Plight of the Stargazer (1985) was scheduled for release in October 2000, but failed to materialize.	JV Games	Telegames
Tube	The tentatively titled Tube was a space shooter intended to utilize simple 3D graphics. While planned for release in 2000, it was one of several Game Boy Color games from Karma Studios to be cancelled that year.	Karma Studios	
Turbo Racing Challenge	Turbo Racing Challenge was a racing game featuring a behind-the-back perspective and pseudo-3D graphics similar to OutRun. However the game was ultimately cancelled along with multiple other games from Karma Studios.	Karma Studios	
Tyrannosaurus Tex	The only first person shooter to ever be announced for the Game Boy Color, Tyrannosaurus Tex was originally scheduled for release in 2001. However, publisher Eidos Interactive subsequently decided to drop the project, and developer Slitherine Software failed to find a new publisher, forcing the game's cancellation. In 2013, a prototype of the game was found and released onto the internet. The rights to the game were acquired by Piko Interactive, who completed the game and released an aftermarket cartridge in May 2018.	Slitherine Software	Eidos Interactive
Tyrian 2000	A port of Tyrian (1995), based on its Tyrian 2000 (1999) re-release, was being produced for Game Boy Color and Game Boy Advance by members of the game's original development team. However, the game's publisher Symmetry Entertainment went out of business, leading to the game's cancellation. In 2007, original programmer Jason Emery released the ROMs for both versions onto the internet.	World Tree Games	Symmetry Entertainment
Viewpoint	A Game Boy Color port of Viewpoint (1992) was scheduled for an October 1999 release, but was cancelled for unknown reasons.		Sammy Studios
VR Sports Powerboat Racing	A version of VR Sports Powerboat Racing (1998) was in production for Game Boy Color, but was cancelled alongside a planned Nintendo 64 version in 2001.	Vicarious Visions	Vatical Entertainment
War Monster	The RTS War Monster began development on the Game Boy Color. While planned for release in 2000, the game was cancelled after failing to find a publisher. The concept would later be reworked and released for cell phones as War Monster Online (2005).	Wicked Witch Software	
Wicked Surfing	The surfing game Wicked Surfing was planned for release in January 2000. However, due to the publisher's financial difficulties, the game was cancelled.	Run and Gun	Interplay Entertainment
WWF No Mercy	A Game Boy Color version of WWF No Mercy (2000) was intended for release alongside its Nintendo 64 counterpart, with plans to allow in-game currency to be shared between the two using the Transfer Pak. However, this feature was dropped before the N64 version's release, and the GBC port was subsequently cancelled.	Natsume	THQ
Z-Quence	Z-Quence, a puzzle game involving morphing shapes and colors, was announced in 1999, but failed to find a publisher and was cancelled alongside several other Game Boy Color games from Karma Studios.	Karma Studios	
