= Tweety and the Magic Gems =

2001 video game

- North American cover art
- Developer: Kotobuki System
- Publisher: Kemco
- Series: Looney Tunes
- Platform: Game Boy Advance
- Release: JP: March 21, 2001; EU: June 22, 2001; NA: July 30, 2001
- Genre: Party game
- Modes: Single-player, multiplayer

Tweety and the Magic Gems, known in Japan as Tweety's Hearty Party (トゥイティーのハーティーパーティー, Tuitī no Hātī Pātī), is a party video game developed by Kotobuki System and published by Kemco in 2001 for Game Boy Advance. The game was a launch title in Japan and Europe.

== Gameplay ==
Tweety and the Magic Gems is a party video game. The gameplay is presented in the form of a traditional board game. With each turn, the player must draw a card and move the number of spaces indicated on the card. They must find the required amount of gems scattered within city sub-boards. Spaces on the board include item shops and other random events. Most spaces will trigger a brief minigame competition. The game features 16 minigames, 50 different items, and maps with more than 200 spaces on each board.

== Plot ==
Tweety wanders through the Deep Dark Woods to escape from Sylvester and finds a box. He opens the box, unleashing dark magic, turning his feet to stone. Suddenly, the Enchanted Queen of the Deep Dark Woods, who is really Granny, finds out about this and summons Bugs Bunny, Daffy Duck, Porky Pig, Sylvester, Yosemite Sam, and Marc Antony to help her break the spell. To do this, the Looney Tunes must travel around the world in search of the five Magic Gems to harness their powers. However, if they don't collect the powers of the five gems before Tweety's entire body turns to stone, Tweety will remain that way forever.

== Reception ==
Reception

Aggregate score
Aggregator	Score
Metacritic	45/100

Review scores
Publication	Score
Electronic Gaming Monthly	(unfavorable)
Famitsu	21/40
GamesMaster	45%
GameSpot	3.2/10
IGN	4.5/10
Jeuxvideo.com	7/20
Next Generation	1/5
Nintendo Power	2.5/5

Tweety and the Magic Gems received "generally unfavorable reviews" according to the review aggregation website Metacritic. In Japan, Famitsu gave it a score of 21 out of 40.

GameSpot criticized its tedious gameplay and bloated scope in its review, stating, "...overwrought scope and stunted presentation of Tweety & The Magic Gems ensures that it won't be the GBA's archetypal innovator." IGN concluded, "While Tweety & the Magic Gems isn't the worst game in the GBA's line-up, it's definitely among the bottom of the barrel. The board game is annoyingly long, and the mini-games are surprisingly short. There's no real balance in the game design...it's just all bad." NextGen called it "A game for those who live and die by collections of simplistic party games. Everyone else should steer clear."
