= Porky Pig's Haunted Holiday =

1995 video game

- Front cover art of the North American release
- Developer: Phoenix Interactive Entertainment (Note: Additional support work by Dark Technologies)
- Publisher: Acclaim Entertainment
- Director: Joe Booth
- Producer: Sunsoft
- Designer: Darren Melbourne
- Artist: Paul McGee
- Writer: Joe Booth
- Composers: Kev Bateson^{[a]} Jez Taylor
- Platform: SNES
- Release: NA: October 1995; EU: November 1995
- Genres: Platformer; Action
- Mode: Single-player

Porky Pig's Haunted Holiday is a 1995 side-scrolling platform video game developed by Phoenix Interactive Entertainment, published by Acclaim Entertainment, and produced by Sunsoft for the Super Nintendo Entertainment System video game console. The goal of the game is to guide the main character, Porky Pig from the Warner Bros. cartoons, through his nightmares. The game received mixed to positive reviews by critics; its graphics and animations were received well while its length and easy difficulty were not.

== Gameplay ==
Porky Pig's Haunted Holiday is a side-scrolling platform game. The main character, Porky Pig, can move left and right, jump, swing on chains, climb, enter doorways and ride bubbles underwater. Standing on some platforms causes a vampire-costumed Daffy Duck to appear, scaring Porky and propelling him up into the air to reach high places. Enemies in a level can be defeated either by jumping on them or hitting them with fruit after collecting a fruit bowl power-up.

At the beginning of the game, Porky starts with five lives and the goal is to make it to the end of all levels. Porky loses a life if all of his hearts are lost, which happens if Porky is hit by an enemy. Checkpoints that look like a red X mark are scattered throughout the levels. Going past a checkpoint makes Porky stick a flag into the ground and that's where he'll start from if a life is lost later in the level. If all lives are lost, there is an unlimited continue to feature that restarts the player in the same level.

Gameplay in the first level of Porky Pig's Haunted Holiday

The player is introduced to the story of the game with one in-game cutscene. The story goes as following: On the night before Porky Pig's vacation starts, he goes to bed. Asleep, he starts having nightmares where he meets different scary characters. In order to wake up, he must travel through all of the levels in the game.

There are several different types of power-ups and items in the game. Collecting the fruit bowl mentioned earlier supplies Porky with unlimited fruit to throw at enemies until he loses a life. Heart items found scattered in the levels refills one of his hearts. Picking up 100 cupcake power-ups, which an on-screen counter keeps track of, rewards the player with an extra life. There is also a cake power-up to collect, which increases the in-game score. A potion power-up will, if collected by Porky, inflate him for a limited time. He then starts to float and can be moved up, down and as always left and right.

There are six levels and at the end of each level is a boss. Between levels, a world map displays the player's progress. The first level, The Haunted Woods, takes Porky through a forest with goblins, ghosts, magical walking cauldrons, spiders, leprechauns and bats. Notable is also a tree with a rotating 3D-effect. In the end of the level a boss named Spooky Sid is fought. The second level is Dry Gulch Town, and it takes Porky through a western type of town, including tumbleweed and caged hooligans while foes with moose trophies with rifle barrels showing from their mouths, where Six Shootin' Sheriff Sam is the boss in the end of the level. The third level first takes place on a small raft and later on under the sea in the Ruins of Atlantis. Diving turkeys and barracudas are enemies found there, and Porky can ride on bubbles exhaled from a special kind of sea creature. And Willie Great White is the boss foe. In the fourth level, an abandoned mine, Hyde Tweety is the boss. The fifth level is in the Snowy Alps, which will eventually transcend into a delusional landscape where it literally rains cats and dogs as well as fish skeletons Monster Max is the boss of that level. In the sixth and final level, Porky goes through the castle of Daffy The Count Duck and clashes with Herman the robot boss in his chamber as the final boss.

In the options screen, three different difficulty levels can be selected. A sound test feature and a controller configuration setting is also available.

== Development ==
Porky Pig's Haunted Holiday was developed by Phoenix Interactive Entertainment. Darren Melbourne designed the core elements of the game while Kev Bruce composed the music and sound effects. The Merry-Go-Round Broke Down song, also known as the Looney Tunes theme, was added to the game. Notable graphical effects include parallax scrolling and a weather effect which means that every time the game is played the weather can be different. For example: sometimes it may be snowing and sometimes it may be raining.

The game's publisher was originally Hudson Soft, who owned the license to publish games with Warner Bros. characters at the time, but it sold the rights to Porky Pig's Haunted Holiday on to Acclaim Entertainment from 1995 to 2004 and 2025 onwards. The game was ultimately published by Sunsoft. Some versions of the game were distributed by Acclaim and some by Sunsoft, both under license of Warner Bros.

== Reception ==
Reception

Review scores
Publication	Score
AllGame	3/5
Consoles +	83%
Electronic Gaming Monthly	8/10, 5.5/10, 7/10, 6.5/10
Mega Fun	48%
Nintendo Life	6/10
Official Nintendo Magazine	75/100
Player One	78%
Super Game Power	3.8/5
Super Play	72%
Total!	78/100
Nintendo Magazine System	55/100
Super Power	83%
Ultra Player	3/6
VideoGames	4/10

Porky Pig's Haunted Holiday received mixed to positive reviews. The graphics and animations received praise as well as the weather system, about which a reviewer from Electronic Gaming Monthly commented: "It's a great idea; it should be used more often". Generally well received was also the music and sound effects, although some reviewers found the music loops to be too short. In addition, the controls in the game were considered by some critics to be easy to use. On the other hand, some critics thought the challenge of the game was too easy and the levels too short and/or too few. Also, some reviewers thought the game was unoriginal and just reused many gameplay elements popularized by other games in the same genre. Most of the critics recommended the game for younger children.

== See also ==
- List of Looney Tunes video games

== Notes ==
Credited as "Kev B"
