= Carnivale (film) =

- Original theatrical poster
- Directed by: Deane Taylor
- Screenplay by: Greg Haddrick; Isabeau Merle
- Story by: Deane Taylor
- Produced by: Russell Boland; Gerry Shirren
- Starring: Hugh Laurie; David Antrobus; Steve Brody; Amanda Abbington; Ron Haddrick; Helena Bonham Carter
- Edited by: Gerry Gogan
- Music by: Stephen McKeon
- Production companies: Foundry Film Partners; TerraGlyph Animation; Millimages; Moro Studios
- Distributed by: BAC Films(France); Capitol Films (Ireland)
- Release dates: July 10, 1999 (Galway Film Festival); February 9, 2000 (France)
- Running time: 74 minutes
- Countries: Ireland; Spain; France
- Language: English
- Budget: $10-12 million

Carnivale is a 1999 French-Irish animated film directed by Deane Taylor.

== Premise ==
Four children and their cat find a magic ticket that admits them entry into a magical and mysterious amusement park that at first seems inviting, but grows more sinister once they try to leave.

== Cast ==
- Hugh Laurie as Cenzo
- David Antrobus as Jack
- Steve Brody as Eddy
- Amanda Abbington as Ginger
- Ron Haddrick as Banjo
- Helena Bonham Carter as Milly

Additional voices were performed by Lee Perry, Jamie Oxenbould, Ron Haddrick, Paul Tylak, Olivia Martin, and Lisa Bailey.

== Production ==
The film marked the directorial debut of Deane Taylor who had previously worked as an art director on films such as The Nightmare Before Christmas and All Dogs Go to Heaven 2. Production on the film began in June 1997 until it was completed in February 1999. Producer Gerry Shirren had previously worked as a producer on several Don Bluth films. Taylor had always been fascinated by amusement parks especially with the stark contrast of people who see them as places of fear and fun and wanted to incorporate both of those mindsets into an adventure film for children. Taking inspiration from his work as a theater decorator, Taylor arranged shots in the film as if they were from a child's point of view and coded the lighting so the film began with a bright light source from above while getting progressively darker as the story moves along. For the look of the amusement park itself Taylor based the designs on illustrations of circuses and game galleries from the turn of the century.

== Reception ==
In his review for Variety, Paul Power described Carnivale as a "Well-made debut feature by a former Tim Burton collaborator".

== Cancelled video game ==
In May 1999, it was announced Vatical Entertainment and Terraglyph Interactive Studios had been working on a tie-in video game based on the film to be released on Nintendo 64, Sony PlayStation, and Game Boy Color with a playable demo set for that year's E3. After the film failed to find widespread distribution, Vatical ultimately decided to cancel the game as TerraGlyph was beset by development issues that culminated with the company laying off a majority of their workforce leaving the game only 50-60% complete.
