= The Addams Family: Pugsley's Scavenger Hunt =

1992 video game

- SNES box art
- Developers: Ocean; Enigma Variations (Game Boy, NES)
- Publisher: Ocean
- Director: Colin Gordon
- Producer: Darren Melbourne
- Programmer: Stephen Hey
- Artists: Chris Edwards; Paul J. McKee
- Composer: Jonathan Dunn
- Platforms: Super NES, Game Boy, NES
- Release: EU: 1992; NA: February 1993
- Genre: Platform
- Mode: Single-player

The Addams Family: Pugsley's Scavenger Hunt is a platform game released by Ocean in 1992 in Europe and 1993 in North America. It is based on the 1992 animated series. It was released in North America for the Super Nintendo Entertainment System in February 1993, Game Boy in July 1993, and the Nintendo Entertainment System in August 1993.

The Game Boy and NES versions were ported by Enigma Variations.

== Plot ==
The plot of Pugsley's Scavenger Hunt centered on Pugsley's attempts to win a scavenger hunt challenge proposed by his sister, Wednesday. His hunt takes him to the bedrooms of each member of the Addams family in order to find one item from each.

== Gameplay ==
Super NES screenshot

The game is a side-scrolling platform game that plays in a very similar way to the previous Addams Family game. The player can choose which level to attempt by entering whichever door they choose in the Addams house.

== Ports ==
The NES version is not a direct port of the SNES version. The NES version was based on the previous Addams Family game released for Super NES, Mega Drive and Amiga, showing the same levels, enemies, items and gameplay but with Pugsley as main character instead of Gomez.

The NES version lacks the freezer and crypt levels (they were reduced to the boss fights only) and the rest of the levels are shorter. It also lacks any in-game music. The NES version also omits the two weapons from the SNES (swords and golf balls). It does allow the player to obtain a password whenever they paused the game, whereas the SNES Addams Family only displays passwords after each boss was defeated.

The Game Boy version is a trimmed down port of the NES version. The stove level was completely removed (defeating the snowman boss would award Pugsley a heart like the other versions, but would also free Granny) as well as the big bird boss (Pugsley would start the game with the extra heart already in his possession). The final level was also removed, as entering the final door would send Pugsley directly to the final boss fight. Thing's hint boxes were also removed from this version.

== Reception ==
Reception

Review scores
Publication	Score
Aktueller Software Markt	SNES: 5/12
Computer and Video Games	SNES: 87/100
Electronic Gaming Monthly	GB: 31/50; NES: 7/10
GameFan	SNES: 320/400
GamePro	SNES: 14.5/20
GameZone	SNES: 90/100
Mega Fun	SNES: 73/100
Nintendo Life	SNES: 7/10
Nintendo Power	NES: 13.5/20; SNES: 14.1/20
Official Nintendo Magazine	SNES: 89/100
Super Play	SNES: 90%
Total!	GB: 78% SNES: 89%
Nintendo Acción	SNES: 9/12
Power Play	SNES: 65%
Super Action	SNES: 88%

A major source of criticism for the SNES version was the lack of a password feature, despite the game being very difficult. A password feature is present on both the NES and Game Boy versions. Super Play Magazine UK praised the graphics as they were more colourful than in the previous title. Review scores for the SNES version are generally higher than for either the NES or Game Boy versions.

Total!, in 1995, ranked Pugsley's Scavenger Hunt the 80th best all-time SNES game.
