= Bugs Bunny: Lost in Time =

1999 video game

- NTSC PlayStation cover art
- Developer: Behaviour Interactive
- Publisher: Infogrames
- Director: Claude Pelletier
- Producer: Denis Lacasse
- Designers: Claude Pelletier; Mario Lord
- Programmers: Martin Ross; Stephane Leblanc
- Artists: Pierre-Martin Drolet; Martin Dubeau
- Composer: Gilles Léveillé
- Series: Bugs Bunny
- Platforms: PlayStation; Windows
- Release: PlayStation: EU: June 1999; NA: July 1, 1999; Windows: NA: October 19, 1999; AU: November 17, 1999; EU: 1999
- Genre: Platform
- Mode: Single-player

Bugs Bunny: Lost in Time is a 1999 platform video game developed by Behaviour Interactive, published by Infogrames, and released for the PlayStation and Windows. Based on Bugs Bunny and other Looney Tunes characters from Warner Bros. Entertainment, the game follows Bugs as he becomes trapped in a time slip and must collect clocks to return to the present.

An indirect sequel, Bugs Bunny & Taz: Time Busters, was released for the same platforms in September of the following year.

== Plot ==
The game stars Looney Tunes cartoon character Bugs Bunny, who finds and activates a time travel machine (mistaking it for a carrot juice dispenser) after taking a wrong turn at Albuquerque intended for Pismo Beach. He ends up in Nowhere, home of a sorcerer named Merlin Munroe. Merlin then informs Bugs that he is lost in time, and that he must travel through five different eras of time in order to collect clock symbols and golden carrots, which will allow him to return to the present.

== Gameplay ==
The game finds the player (Bugs Bunny) in a race to collect time clocks. To progress in the game, Bugs must complete stages and various objectives which earn them; stages may also contain clocks out in the open that Bugs can collect, as well as golden carrots. If the player meets a certain threshold of clocks or golden carrots, they will unlock new stages or a new time era (serving as the game's hub worlds), which become accessible by means of a time machine.

The player starts off in an area titled "Nowhere", which acts as a tutorial level; Bugs will learn the basic moves he needs to use to progress through the game. He can kick, jump, pick up objects, roll, jump into rabbit holes to move underground, tiptoe to avoid alerting other enemies, climb ropes, and use his rabbit ears like propellers to slowly descend to the ground from high places. Bugs can also move some objects to get to certain places. Enemies in the game are mostly simple to beat. Some can be defeated with a kick or a jump, while others may require Bugs to be chased by an enemy until they run out of breath, after which they can be kicked from the back. There are also special abilities for Bugs to learn from Merlin much later as he progresses through the game.

While in the time machine, there are five different eras (spanning 21 levels in total) for Bugs to visit. They are the Stone Age, Pirate Years, The 1930s, Medieval Period, and Dimension X. Each level has a varying amount of clock symbols and golden carrots for Bugs to find. There are also normal carrots for Bugs to pick up, which act as health. Carrots can be collected by finding them scattered in a level. He can hold up to 99 carrots, which can be used to purchase golden carrots. After completing a level, Merlin will appear and the player can decide if they wish to save their progress up to that point, he can also be summoned at checkpoints for the same purpose.

== Development ==
Publisher Infogrames acquired the rights to release video games featuring the Looney Tunes characters in early 1998.

In late 2017, beta screenshots of the game surfaced on YouTube, sourced from a German demo disc titled "PlayStation Zone Volume 3". A video containing beta footage of multiple levels including the Stone Age and Medieval Period was also featured in "PlayStation Zone Volume 7".

== Reception ==
Reception

Aggregate score
Aggregator	Score
GameRankings	(PS) 68.33% (PC) 53.75%

Review scores
Publication	Score
AllGame	(PS) 3.5/5 (PC) 1.5/5
Electronic Gaming Monthly	4.5/10
Game Informer	(PS) 5.25/10
GameSpot	(PS) 7.8/10 (PC) 6.1/10
IGN	(PS) 7.8/10
Official U.S. PlayStation Magazine	(PS) 3.5/5
PC Zone	(PC) 24%
Superjuegos	(PS) 83/100
Australian PlayStation	(PS) 61/100
Gamers' Republic	(PS) C−
Playstation Plus	(PS) 60%
Playstation Pro	(PS) 79/100

The game was met with average to mixed reception, as GameRankings gave it a score of 68.33% for the PlayStation version, and 53.75% for the PC version. Many critics complimented its faithfulness to the Looney Tunes source material, although some disparaged certain technicalities from its controls and camera; the PC port was further criticized for issues regarding playability. Craig Harris, writing for IGN, concluded: "There's nothing bad about the game at all ¿ it's just standard fare. It's a great game for Looney Tunes fans to pick up, since it has a lot of references to all the cartoons from their childhood and beyond. There are better platform games out there, but Lost in Time is a good one," giving the PlayStation version a 7.8 rating.
