= Bugs Bunny & Taz: Time Busters =

2000 video game

- NTSC cover art featuring Taz and Bugs Bunny
- Developer: Artificial Mind and Movement
- Publisher: Infogrames
- Producer: Denis Lacasse
- Designers: Claude Pelletier; Thomas Wilson; Steeve Lapointe
- Programmers: Martin Ross; Jonathan Bouchard; Philippe Gagnon
- Artist: Martin Dubeau
- Composer: Gilles Léveillé
- Series: Bugs Bunny
- Platforms: Windows; PlayStation
- Release: PlayStation: NA: November 24, 2000; EU: November 24, 2000; Microsoft: NA: September 2000; EU: December 8, 2000
- Genre: Platform
- Modes: Single-player, multiplayer

Bugs Bunny & Taz: Time Busters is a 2000 platform video game developed by Artificial Mind and Movement, published by Infogrames, and released for the PlayStation and Windows. It is based on Bugs Bunny and Taz, and other Looney Tunes characters by Warner Bros. Entertainment, and is an indirect sequel to the game Bugs Bunny: Lost in Time (1999). It was later released on a twin pack CD bundled with Wacky Races (2000) in 2003.

As of October 2026, it is the final game in the Bugs Bunny series of Looney Tunes video games.

== Gameplay ==
The main objective of the game is to collect all of the Time Regulator Gears scattered around the levels, which are required to progress through all four different eras: the Aztec Era, the Viking Era, the Arabian Era, and the Transylvanian Era.

The gameplay plays much the same as Bugs Bunny: Lost in Time, retaining Bugs' traits (sans being able to lift and carry crates, or push heavy objects), but introducing new ones to Taz, as well as a co-op mode where one player can control Bugs, with the other controlling Taz; alternatively, the game can be played in single-player, with the player having to switch between controlling Bugs and Taz throughout the game. Both characters need to be used to make use of their unique abilities to make areas accessible and defeat certain enemies. Unlike in the last game, both characters are able to swim (albeit Bugs is faster), and Bugs is able to climb ledges for the first time in the series.

Jumping on Taz's head allows Bugs to climb higher than in the last game, and if Bugs remains stationary around Taz for too long, then he will bite him depleting his health. Health can be distributed between characters if one attacks the other, and carrots are the source of health for both.

All eras are accessed from the central hub world Granwich (a pun on Greenwich Mean Time). Once an era has been completed of its levels, a boss must be confronted and defeated, along with collecting nearly all of the current era's gears, in order to unlock the next era. After the last era is completed, the player is given two different endings based on if all gears were collected. If all gears are not collected, the player can choose to continue playing to collect the remaining gears.

== Plot ==
While on duty as the top pest controller for "Jet Age Pest Control", Daffy Duck (Joe Alaskey) accidentally breaks Granny's Time Regulator and is thrown back in time with the core of this machine, a precious Time Gem. The time regulator goes haywire, hurtling various residents of different eras in time across time and space, and the gears that help the regulator function are scattered as well. Bugs Bunny (Billy West) arrives at Granny's house, and is tasked with finding the Time Gem, the gears, the lost characters, and Daffy with Granny's pet Taz (Jim Cummings). Bugs and Taz solve various puzzles and battle local villains, many of whom Daffy has run afoul of due to greedily trying to steal their riches.

The game features two possible endings upon the defeat of the final boss, Count Bloodcount (Joe Alaskey). If the player has not collected all the Time Regulator's gears by the time they defeat Bloodcount, Granny (June Foray) asks the player to return to the game to retrieve the remaining gears; if the player refuses, Granny accepts the Time Regulator not working perfectly, and Daffy is left in the Transylvanian Era to be killed and eaten by Count Bloodcount. If the player either agrees to return to collect the remaining gears and succeeds, or has already collected them all by the time they defeat Bloodcount, Granny fully repairs the Time Regulator and rescues Daffy from Bloodcount. The gateways to the various eras are then sealed off forever, and Daffy returns to the present shrunken to insect size.

== Reception ==
Reception

Aggregate scores
| Aggregator | Score | |
| Aggregator | PC | PS |
|---|---|---|
| GameRankings | 70% | 75% |
| Metacritic | N/A | 72/100 |

Review scores
| Publication | Score | |
| Publication | PC | PS |
|---|---|---|
| AllGame | 3/5 | 3.5/5 |
| Electronic Gaming Monthly | N/A | 7.67/10 |
| Game Informer | N/A | 8.5/10 |
| GameSpot | N/A | 7.5/10 |
| GameZone | 8/10 | N/A |
| IGN | 6.8/10 | 7.9/10 |
| Official U.S. PlayStation Magazine | N/A | 3/5 |
| PC Zone | 67% | N/A |

The PlayStation version received "mixed or average reviews" according to Metacritic. Frank Provo of GameSpot wrote that the game "does an excellent job of capturing the humor and personality that the Looney Tunes franchise embodies."
