= Speedy Gonzales: Los Gatos Bandidos =

1995 video game

- Cover art
- Developer: Sunsoft
- Publisher: Acclaim Entertainment
- Director: Rene Boutin
- Composer: Mark Cooksey
- Platform: Super NES
- Release: 1995
- Mode: Single-player

Speedy Gonzales: Los Gatos Bandidos is a Super Nintendo Entertainment System video game published by Acclaim Entertainment and developed by Sunsoft in 1995.

== Summary ==
Players can access a short-range kick for attacking and can occasionally pick up items for usage at a later time in the game. The game is full of bottomless pits and spikes, which kill players instantly. Getting locked up in a cage also causes players to lose a life. Arch-enemies from the cartoon show such as Sylvester and Robocat appear in the game. In Stage 6-1, there is a specific button in one section on the level that used to lock up emulators, due to improper emulation on how the game executed code for the button. Near, known for their emulator higan, documented on how this occurred and how it was fixed.

== Reception ==
Reception

Review score
Publication	Score
Power Unlimited	49%

Captain Squideo of GamePro gave the game a mostly mixed review, particularly focusing on the easy and rudimentary gameplay: "The game's colorful cartoon style is reminiscent of last year's Yogi Bear game, and the simplistic run-n-jump gameplay will appeal only to young gamers. ... The puzzles are remedial, enemies drop with one quick kick, and abundant time bonuses help you beat the clock." However, he did praise the quality and charm of the music, voices, and sound effects. A reviewer for Next Generation criticized that the gameplay mechanics and level designs are mostly shamelessly ripped off from the Sonic the Hedgehog series, and handled poorly with choppy animation and "a momentum that makes you feel as though you're controlling a large walrus, rather than a mouse." He gave it one out of five stars.

The game gained some attention years after release due to the discovery of a 1996 bootleg version that replaced Speedy Gonzales with Sonic the Hedgehog.
