= Desert Demolition =

1995 video game

Desert Demolition Starring Road Runner and Wile E. Coyote
- North American box art
- Developer: BlueSky Software
- Publisher: Sega
- Director: Jennifer Cleary
- Producer: Tony Van
- Programmers: Barbara Michalec; Ron Thompson
- Artist: Marty Davis
- Composer: Sam Powell
- Platform: Sega Genesis
- Release: NA: February 1995; EU: April 21, 1995
- Genre: Platform
- Mode: Single-player

Desert Demolition Starring Road Runner and Wile E. Coyote is a platform video game developed by BlueSky Software and published by Sega for the Sega Genesis. The game was released in North America in February 1995 and in Europe on April 21, 1995. The game is based around Wile E. Coyote and the Road Runner, who are the game's player characters and are tasked with playing through a series of levels as they respectively pursue and evade the other. The game was re-released as part of the Sega Mega Hits range in September 1997.

== Gameplay ==
Desert Demolition is a platform game in which the player can choose to control either the Road Runner or Wile E. Coyote for the game's duration. As either character, the player must traverse through a series of five levels and a final boss stage; the Road Runner must do so while evading Wile E., while Wile E. can repeatedly capture the Road Runner with the aid of special ACME gadgets. The Road Runner has the ability to use his signature beeping vocalization to startle Wile E. if he is positioned behind him, while Wile E. can pounce in an effort to capture the Road Runner. Both characters can run in a short burst of speed by using "Turbo Boost" icons scattered within the levels.

As either character, the player is given a limited amount of health that is displayed as a red bar on the upper-left side of the screen and is depleted by taking damage from traps and hazards or, as the Road Runner, coming into contact with Wile E.. The player also has a limited amount of time to complete each level, which is displayed at the bottom of the screen. The player will lose a life if the health bar is fully depleted or if the allotted time runs out. Health can be replenished by consuming piles of bird seed as the Road Runner or by consuming jars of vitamin pills as Wile E., and extra time can be added to the timer by collecting clocks. If the number of lives in stock is completely exhausted, the game ends prematurely. Extra lives can be obtained by collecting icons in the shape of the Road Runner's or Wile E.'s head.

Each level is divided into two acts, and littered throughout the levels are stamps that can be collected. Wile E. can collect a series of stamps with each successful capture of the Road Runner, while the Road Runner can collect extra stamps by startling Wile E. with a vocalization from behind, trampling him with a Turbo Boost or luring him into obstacles and traps. If a minimum of 125 stamps are collected within a level, a bonus stage will be initiated at the conclusion of the given level's second act. These stages can be used to stockpile Turbo Boosts and lives, and will end when the player reaches the end of the stage or if the allotted time runs out.

ACME-labeled crates can be found throughout each level. As Wile E., the player can enter a crate and emerge using one of various contraptions that will often augment Wile E.'s movement and aid in the capture of the Road Runner. As the Road Runner, the crates should be avoided as Wile E. will ambush the Road Runner using the same contraptions if the crate's vicinity is approached.

=== Endings ===
Completing the game results in two different endings for each character, both of which feature cameo appearances by Bugs Bunny, Daffy Duck, Tweety Bird, Sylvester the Cat, Porky Pig, and Elmer Fudd (all of whom are working as employees of ACME Corporation). If playing as the Road Runner, a banner will come down from the ceiling that states: "Congratulations! ACME President", indicating the Road Runner has been named the President, leading Wile E. to panic and crash through the glass window behind him, leaving his silhouette in the window. If playing as Wile E., the banner says, "Congratulations! ACME Customer of the Year", Bugs presents Wile E. with a trophy that goes with the award, and the others clap for him as the Road Runner says his trademark "Beep, beep!" and leaves, leaving the Coyote in shock. Balloons and streams fall from the ceiling.

== Reception ==
Reception

Review scores
| Publication | Score |
|---|---|
| Computer and Video Games | 37/100 |
| Electronic Gaming Monthly | 7/10, 7/10, 6/10, 7/10 |
| Game Informer | 6.75/10 |
| Game Players | 79% |
| GameFan | 89/100, 85/100, 82/100 |
| Hyper | 74/100 |
| Next Generation | 3/5 |
| Electronic Games | B |
| Mega | 69% |
| Sega Magazine | 46/100 |
| Sega Power | 55% |
| Sega Pro | 82% |
| VideoGames | 7/10 |

Desert Demolition received average critical reception. GamePro's Captain Squideo called it "a lightweight frolic", commenting that playing as the Road Runner is one-dimensional and overly easy, but playing as Wile E. Coyote offers a varied gameplay experience with humorous animations. Electronic Gaming Monthly's four editors unanimously panned the game, saying that the graphics and animation are outstanding but that poor control made it frustrating and unenjoyable.

Next Generation stated that the game "the humor and feel of the Warner Brothers' classic like no other", remarking that playing as Wile E. Coyote was a more varied and enjoyable experience than playing as the Road Runner. They commended the game's animation and sound effects, but noted its short length and low difficulty. Sam Hickman and Richard Leadbetter of Sega Magazine criticized the game for its lack of originality.

Desert Demolition was the 9th highest-renting Genesis title at Blockbuster Video in April 1995.
