= Looney Tunes: Duck Amuck =

2007 video game

- Developer: WayForward Technologies
- Publisher: Warner Bros. Interactive Entertainment
- Director: Rob Buchanan
- Producer: Jeff Pomegranate
- Designers: Rob Buchanan; Michael Herbster; Sean Velasco; Chris Anderson
- Programmer: David Wright
- Artist: Pablo Ruvalcaba
- Writer: Luke Brookshier
- Composer: Adam DiTroia
- Platform: Nintendo DS
- Release: NA: October 9, 2007; EU: November 30, 2007; AU: February 6, 2008
- Genre: Party
- Modes: Single-player, multiplayer

Looney Tunes: Duck Amuck is a 2007 party video game developed by WayForward Technologies and published by Warner Bros. Interactive Entertainment for the Nintendo DS. It is based on the Looney Tunes short film Duck Amuck (1953), and sees the player manipulating Daffy Duck's environment to play minigames.

It was released as a companion game to the console game Looney Tunes: Acme Arsenal, being simultaneously released.

== Gameplay ==
Looney Tunes: Duck Amuck is a party video game based on the 1953 Looney Tunes short film Duck Amuck. In this game, the player uses a stylus to compete against Daffy Duck (voiced by Joe Alaskey), with the goal of making him angry by way of various minigames. The game also features wireless game play which allows players to not only gang up on Daffy as a team, but also battle each other in head-to-head competition. The player can also collect many Looney Tunes character coins, which are hidden in the mini-games in the form of sparkles.

Over fifty mini-games can occur in idle mode (when Daffy stands in front of a blank background). In some cases, the player must interact with Daffy to get access to mini-games. If the player picks up Daffy and throws him to the right, multi-player mode will be activated. Throwing Daffy to the left will show the player all the gags (mini-games) that have been unlocked. If the player lets go of Daffy when he is in mid-air, he will fall. These are some of the few ways the player can interact with him.

The game ends in a manner similar to the cartoon: Daffy demands to know who is doing all the scenery and messing him up. In a departure from the short's ending, Daffy himself is shown as the animator (replacing Bugs Bunny), playing a Nintendo DS, proclaiming "Well, if you can't beat 'em, BE them!"

In the secret ending however, which is obtained by completing every mini-game at their hardest difficulty and finding every coin, Daffy leaves the player no choice but to annihilate the "nuclear option" by donning the devil costume and "eating" nuclear objects like gasoline and nuclear items before swallowing the match (a gag recycled from the Friz Freleng-directed cartoon Show Biz Bugs). The game ends with Daffy being blown up and becoming a ghost as he declares it "an ending to remember".

== Reception ==
Reception

Aggregate scores
Aggregator	Score
GameRankings	65.66%
Metacritic	66/100

Review scores
Publication	Score
1Up.com	B+
Electronic Gaming Monthly	7.33/10
Eurogamer	5/10
GamePro	3/5
GameSpot	6/10
GameZone	7.5/10
IGN	6/10
Nintendo Power	8.5/10
Nintendo World Report	7/10
PALGN	7.5/10

Looney Tunes: Duck Amuck received mixed to positive reviews. The game has an average score of 66 out of 100 at Metacritic, and 65.66% at GameRankings.
