= Tweety's High-Flying Adventure (video game) =

2000 video game

Tweety's High Flying Adventure
- Cover art
- Developer: Kemco
- Producer: Kemco
- Platform: Game Boy Color
- Release: November 2000
- Genre: Platform
- Modes: Single-player, Multiplayer

Tweety's High-Flying Adventure is a 2000 Game Boy Color game developed and published by Kemco, and is a platform game based on the 2000 Looney Tunes film of the same name.

== Gameplay ==
Screenshot

Tweety's High-Flying Adventure is a platform game that largely follows the narrative of the film. The player guides Tweety as they undertake a journey to ten different worldwide locations to collect 80 'pawprints' from cats across the globe, including Paris, Venice, Egypt, and San Francisco. These cats appear in each location as enemies, and all of them must have their paw prints collected by temporarily defeating them before the player may progress to the next location. There are 15 collectable items such as weapons that can help the player defeat enemies, a stopwatch to stop time, and oil slicks and banana peels. The game uses a health system consisting of three 'life points', replenished by hearts. The game includes a link cable support for two players and a battery save feature.

== Reception ==
Reception

Review scores
Publication	Score
AllGame	3/5
IGN	8/10
Game Boy Xtreme	61%
Total Game Boy Color	79%
Game Boy Power	61%
Nintendo Official Magazine	82%

Tweety's High Flying Adventure received positive reviews. Total Game Boy Color stated that the game's "graphics and sounds are suitably upbeat and quirky", and praised the variety, saying "every level is totally re-designed, with differing pick-ups and enemies". Writing for Game Boy Power, Russell Barnes praised the "well-presented (story) with familiar characters and good humor", although stated that the game featured "repetitive gameplay" and "more variety (was) needed". Jon Thompson for Allgame found the game's visuals "extremely appealing", stating "Kemco has done a very admirable job with both the look and the sound, which features a host of buoyant musical tracks that are quite high quality for the Game Boy." Craig Harris of IGN stated the game was a "formulaic platformer", saying "the controls are extremely simplistic", and "the level design is formulaic and predictable", noting "the game doesn't change its design throughout the journey".
