= Sylvester & Tweety: Breakfast on the Run =

1998 video game

- German box art
- Developer: Bit Managers
- Publisher: Infogrames
- Producer: Erwan Kergall
- Designer: Rubén Angel Gómez
- Programmers: Daniel Lopez; Isidro Gilabert
- Artists: Sergio Palacios; Javier Garcia; Julio Jose Moruno
- Composer: Alberto Jose González
- Platform: Game Boy Color
- Release: 1998
- Genre: Platformer
- Mode: Single-player

Sylvester & Tweety: Breakfast on the Run, known as Looney Tunes: Twouble! in North America, is a 2D and isometric, pseudo-3D platform video game developed by Bit Managers and published by Infogrames for the Game Boy Color in 1998. It features the Looney Tunes characters Sylvester and Tweety. Other Looney Tunes include Bugs Bunny, Daffy Duck, Granny, Hector the Bulldog, Taz, Pepé Le Pew and Marvin the Martian.

== Gameplay ==
The player controls Sylvester and navigates him through 5 levels, which are divided into 2 parts (2D Mode and 3D Mode). Sylvester tries to capture Tweety while avoiding enemies and obstacles. Key items can be stored in the inventory and combined to make a helpful, new item if the player has the right combination. A password system is used to save progress.

== Reception ==
IGN gave it a rating of 5/10. Los Angeles Times remarked “an adventure-style game that lacks almost any redeeming quality.”
