= Bugs Bunny in Double Trouble =

1996 video game

- North American Genesis cover
- Developers: Atod; Probe Entertainment; Climax
- Publisher: Sega
- Producers: Mike Gamble; Tim May; Andy Pang
- Designer: Nick Baynes
- Programmers: Christoffer Nilsson (GEN/MD); Thomas Liljetoft (GG)
- Artist: Michael Nilsson
- Composer: Andy Brock
- Platforms: Genesis, Game Gear
- Release: NA: August 1996; EU: September 5, 1996
- Genre: Platform
- Mode: Single-player

Bugs Bunny in Double Trouble is a Looney Tunes video game for the Sega Genesis and Game Gear, released in 1996. The game stars Bugs Bunny and features pre-rendered 3D graphics.

== Gameplay ==
The main levels are loosely based on various classic Bugs Bunny cartoons, such as "Duck! Rabbit, Duck!", "Bully for Bugs", "Knighty Knight Bugs" and many more, including a bonus level which is accessed by collecting Bonus Stars in the main levels, only in the Genesis version. Each level has a set objective for Bugs to complete, such as turning the signs from Rabbit Season to Duck Season in "Duck! Rabbit, Duck!", or collecting trap parts to pull off on the bull in "Bully for Bugs".

== Plot ==
One night, Bugs Bunny is fast asleep in his bed as he starts to drift off into a dream. In his dream, he sees Yosemite Sam experimenting on a "giant carrot serum", but before he could take action, Sam orders Gossamer to fetch the rabbit's brain for his robot, prompting chase. Bugs soon comes across a "Televisor" and gets transported to many of his times from older cartoons, which he must complete several objectives in each level.

After finishing all 4 levels, Bugs attempts to escape the haunted castle and defeat both Gossamer and Yosemite Sam in the laboratory. He eventually succeeds and exits the castle to escape inside a rocket ship. Bugs soon found himself stranded in outer space after the launch, as he spots a nearby space scooter which he uses to travel across the galaxy and face a new threat: Marvin the Martian and his trusty pet dog K-9. Upon reaching Marvin's home planet, Mars, Bugs comes across some levers and switches them around, foiling Marvin's plans, and upon leaving back to Earth, he tosses the dynamite stick he previously rescued over to Marvin, resulting in the destruction of Mars itself. Eventually, Bugs wakes up back in his bed, only to find a giant carrot sitting right in front of him, much to his shock.

== Reception ==
Reception

Review scores
Publication	Score
Electronic Gaming Monthly	5.25/10 (GEN)
Next Generation	2/5 (GEN)

The Genesis version received mediocre reviews. Critics widely praised the bright, colorful graphics and usage of old Warner Bros. cartoons and characters, though some criticized that the controls make navigating certain areas frustrating. However, reviews generally concluded that while the game is competent in most respects, it lacks any major innovation to draw the interest of anyone but hardcore Warner Bros. fans.

GamePro gave the Game Gear version a brief negative review, criticizing the gameplay, music, and particularly the difficult-to-see graphics, commenting that "signs, enemies, and items are so tiny you'll need a magnifying glass".

Game Informer gave the game an overall score of 7.25 out of 10, praising how Sega did very well capturing the spirit of the cartoon and keeping the gameplay fast and random concluding: "Double Trouble is fairly perplexing at first, but once mastered it's a blast for all, especially the gaming youth!"
