= The Bugs Bunny Birthday Blowout =

1990 video game

- North American cover art
- Developer: Kemco
- Publishers: Kemco-Seika (U.S.); Kemco (Japan, Europe)
- Composer: Hiroyuki Masuno
- Platform: Nintendo Entertainment System
- Release: JP: August 3, 1990; NA: September 1990; EU: Q4 1990
- Genre: Platform
- Mode: Single-player

The Bugs Bunny Birthday Blowout, known in Japan and on the title screen as Happy Birthday Bugs (ハッピーバースディ・バッグス) and in Europe as The Bugs Bunny Blowout, is a platform video game developed and published by Kemco for the Nintendo Entertainment System in 1990.

== Plot ==
It is Bugs Bunny's 50th birthday anniversary. However, his friends, who were not invited, feel envious and decide to prevent Bugs from getting to his birthday party. By the time Bugs reaches his house, it turns out that his friends were playing tricks on him to stall him until they got his party ready.

== Gameplay ==
The game is a side-scrolling platform game where players control Bugs Bunny on a quest to get to his 50th birthday party. He is armed with a mallet that he can swing at various enemies to defeat them, deflect certain projectiles or destroy bricks. He can also collect hearts to restore his health and carrots for bonus points. He can also land on top of enemies without getting damaged. At the end of most levels, Bugs Bunny has to use his mallet to defeat a Warner Brothers cartoon character, such as Foghorn Leghorn, Sylvester, or the Tasmanian Devil. These other Looney Tunes characters are trying to stop Bugs because they are all jealous that Bugs gets all the attention. Many of them can be damaged with the mallet or their own projectiles, but Daffy Duck can only be avoided in order to reach a carrot that takes him to the next level. Despite appearing on the cover, Porky Pig does not appear in the game. The cover art was designed by Larry Grossman.

At the end of each level, Bugs can play a minigame, which allows him to earn extra lives. The total amount he can earn is 99. Despite the name on the packaging, the North American and European releases retain the game's Japanese title, Happy Birthday Bugs, on the game's title screen.

== Reception ==
Reception

Review scores
Publication	Score
Famitsu	5/10, 7/10, 7/10, 5/10
GameZone	40/100
Video Games (DE)	59%

The Bugs Bunny Birthday Blowout was released in Japan for the Family Computer on August 3, 1990.

It received average to positive reviews. Spanish magazine Super Juegos gave the game 72.6. Brazilian magazine VideoGame gave the game four out of five stars. French magazine Joypad gave the game 80%. Italian magazine Consolemania gave it 77.
