= Looney Tunes (video game) =

1992 video game

- Developer: Sunsoft
- Publisher: Sunsoft
- Director: Akito Takeuchi
- Producer: Kiharu Yoshida
- Programmer: Michio Okasaka
- Artists: Shigeyuki Asa; Hiroshi Ito
- Composer: Manami Matsumae
- Series: Looney Tunes
- Platforms: Game Boy, Game Boy Color
- Release: Game Boy: NA: October 2, 1992; JP: December 22, 1992; EU: 1992; Game Boy Color: NA: September 1999; EU: September 1999
- Genre: Platformer
- Mode: Single player

Looney Tunes is a platform video game developed and published by Sunsoft released for Game Boy in 1992. The game was re-released for Game Boy Color seven years later.

It features Daffy Duck, Tweety, Porky Pig, Taz, Speedy Gonzales, Road Runner and Bugs Bunny as playable characters. Other Looney Tunes characters include Elmer Fudd, Marvin the Martian, Wile E. Coyote and Sylvester.

== Gameplay ==
There are 7 levels in total, each starring a different Looney Tunes character that the player can control. They each have their own special ability. At the end of every level except 2 and 4, a boss must be beaten in order to progress to the next one. A minigame is played after clearing a level in the Game Boy Color rerelease.

== Reception ==
IGN gave it a rating of 6/10. French gaming website Jeuxvideo.com gave it 16/20.
