= Looney Tunes: Acme Arsenal =

2007 video game

- North American PlayStation 2 cover art
- Developer: Redtribe
- Publisher: Warner Bros. Interactive Entertainment
- Engine: Gamebryo
- Platforms: Wii, Xbox 360, PlayStation 2
- Release: NA: October 9, 2007; EU: November 30, 2007; AU: February 6, 2008
- Genre: Action-adventure
- Modes: Single-player, multiplayer

Looney Tunes: Acme Arsenal is a 2007 action-adventure game developed by Redtribe and published by Warner Bros. Interactive Entertainment for the Wii, Xbox 360, and PlayStation 2. It is a companion game to the Nintendo DS game Looney Tunes: Duck Amuck, being simultaneously released.

== Plot ==
A mysterious evil scientist has invented a time machine and sent his robot goons back in time to eliminate the Looney Tunes characters' ancestors, which would erase Bugs Bunny, Daffy Duck, Marvin the Martian, and the rest of the Looney Tunes gang from existence. Luckily, Bugs Bunny catches wind of the plan and rallies the other toons, who decide to travel back in time to set things right.

Bugs and Marvin successfully infiltrate the scientist's evil lair and steal the time travel plans. Returning to Mars, the Tune gang's headquarters, Marvin uses martian technology to recreate the device, allowing the tunes to save their ancestors. Daffy, Yosemite Sam, and the Tasmanian Devil are first to rescue their own respective ancestors, being able to locate them with Marvin's Time Telescope. Afterwards, they are able to observe an evil "Jekyll" Porky Pig working alongside the scientist through the Time Telescope, though lose the signal due to Wile E. Coyote working on upgrading the time machine. Suddenly, Bugs and Taz are grabbed by Porky and sent to a volcanic dimension to fight Porky riding Toro the Bull. The two are able to beat him, but he leaves while the two are rescued.

The Tunes gang are then able to help the ancestors of Bugs, Marvin, and Foghorn Leghorn. Once all their ancestors are saved, the Tune gang discusses their next plan of action, with Taz staying behind and watching the Time Telescope. Frustrated at Porky's constant failures, the evil scientist orders Gossamer to force Porky to drink a tonic called Jekyll Juice that turns him back to his normal pink self. The scientist then drops Porky to Wackyland to be devoured by dodos. Having a change of heart, Gossamer jumps to save Porky. Taz, witnessing this, uses the time machine to jump in and help.

Returning with Porky, the two reunite with the Tunes gang. Porky manages to hold onto the tonic that originally made him evil: Hyde Juice. Bugs drinks it and turns into a green monster. The Tunes gang heads back to Earth, and drop Gossamer and Hyde Bugs back to the evil scientist's lair. The scientist reveals himself as Dr. Frankenbeans, who, with the Tunes busy, has built a giant robot to terrorize the world. Bugs and Gossamer fight and beat Frankenbean's robot together, causing it to explode. Gossamer shakes Dr. Frankenbeans down, making him drop a bottle of Jekyll juice that turns Hyde Bugs back to normal. Bugs realizes Dr. Frankenbeans targeted the Tunes gang due to them teasing his giant head, calling him Egghead. Bugs apologizes, with Dr. Frankenbeans accepting the apology. Bugs is picked up by Marvin's rocket as Gossamer stays behind.

The rest of the Tunes gang decided it would be best to destroy the time machine to make sure nobody could interfere with the past again, so they feed it to Taz. They laugh as the rocket skywrites "That's All Folks!"

== Gameplay ==
The game features both single player and two-player cooperative play. Gameplay is similar to many platform games including combat, puzzle solving and vehicle-based levels. The game also features an "Acme Battle Mode". In this mode, two players fight each other as different characters.

== Reception ==
Reception

Aggregate score
Aggregator	Score		
Aggregator	PS2	Wii	Xbox 360
Metacritic	38/100	27/100	40/100

Review scores
Publication	Score		
Publication	PS2	Wii	Xbox 360
1Up.com	F	F	F
Eurogamer	N/A	3/10	N/A
Game Informer	1.75/10	1.75/10	1.75/10
GameDaily	N/A	N/A	2/10
GameSpot	3/10	3/10	3/10
IGN	5.2/10	3/10	5.2/10
Nintendo Power	N/A	3.5/10	N/A
Official Xbox Magazine (US)	N/A	N/A	6/10
PALGN	3.5/10	N/A	N/A
PlayStation: The Official Magazine	5.5/10	N/A	N/A
TeamXbox	N/A	N/A	5/10

The game received "generally unfavorable" reviews, according to video game review score aggregator Metacritic. GamePro, however, said that the Xbox 360 version "isn't as fun or as inventive as Lego Star Wars but it is an interesting introduction to the Looney Tunes world and further proof that the characters have retained their ability to charm and entertain. Here's hoping that this title helps turn another generation onto the wonders of the magical and timeless Looney Tunes cartoons." (Note: GamePro gave the Xbox 360 version 4/5 for graphics, and three 3.5/5 scores for sound, control, and fun factor.)
