= Daffy Duck in Hollywood (video game) =

1994 video game

- Mega Drive cover art
- Developers: Psionic Systems; Probe Software (Game Gear & Master System)
- Publisher: Sega
- Composer: Matt Furniss
- Platforms: Master System, Game Gear, Sega Mega Drive
- Release: Game Gear: EU: 1994; Master System: EU: December 1994; Sega Mega Drive: EU: March 14, 1995
- Genre: Platform
- Mode: Single-player

Daffy Duck in Hollywood is a video game published by Sega and released in 1994 for the Sega Mega Drive, Master System and Game Gear.

== Plot ==
The mad Professor Duck Brain has stolen Yosemite Sam's Golden Cartoon Awards and is holding them for ransom. Sam calls upon Daffy Duck to recover his awards and deal with the mad professor and his henchmen.

== Gameplay ==
The player has Daffy Duck traversing through a backstage level in a limited amount of time and finding the exit in order to proceed to the next level. Daffy's weapon of choice is a bubble cannon to shoot enemies. Daffy can also throw punches. Daffy must collect all bundles of dynamite before he can exit the level. Collectible items provide bonus points, powerups, extra lives and access to a bonus level. Many of the level names reference previous cartoon titles including The Duxorcist, Assault and Peppered and others. In the final level, Daffy confronts the final boss Professor Duck Brain.

== Reception ==
Reception

Aggregate score
| Aggregator | Score |
|---|---|
| GameRankings | 60% (Mega Drive) |

Review scores
| Publication | Score |
|---|---|
| Mean Machines Sega | 53% (Mega Drive) |
| Computer and Video Games | 31% (Mega Drive); 75% (SMS) |
| Superjuegos | 62% (Mega Drive) |

Mean Machines Sega reviewers criticised the Mega Drive version for tedious platforming, not being worth the price, having poor graphics and sounds and a close resemblance to Pink Goes to Hollywood, scoring it 53%. Computer and Video Games simply called the Mega Drive version no good with a score of 31%, but regarded the Master System version as more playable and fun, giving a fair score of 75%.

The Game Gear version was one of the best selling games between September 1994 and March 1995. The Master System version was one of the best selling games between September 1994 and May 1995. It was also regarded as one of the top 10 Sega Hits.
