= Desert Speedtrap =

- Developer: Probe Software
- Publisher: Sega
- Producer: Greg Michael
- Programmer: Robert L. Hylands
- Artist: Jason Green
- Composer: Allister Brimble
- Platforms: Master System, Game Gear
- Release: Master System: EU: 1993; Game Gear: EU: 1993; NA: December 1993
- Genre: Action
- Mode: Single-player

Desert Speedtrap Starring Road Runner and Wile E. Coyote is an action game developed by Probe Software, that was released in 1993 for the Master System console and Game Gear.

== Gameplay ==
The Road Runner must outwit the Coyote, while maintaining his strength by eating birdseed.

== Reception ==
Reception

Review scores
Publication	Score	
Publication	Game Gear	Master System
Electronic Gaming Monthly	7.4/10	N/A
GamePro	3.4/5	N/A

Five reviewers on Electronic Gaming Monthly scored the Game Gear version an average score 7.4 out of 10, comparing it to an 8-bit version of Road Runner's Death Valley Rally. Four reviewers on GamePro scored the Game Gear version an average score 3.4 out of 5, criticizing its low quality graphics and music and it's hard difficulty. Power Unlimited gave the Game Gear version a score of 78% writing: "Packed with bonus levels, cartoon jokes and well-hidden power-ups. The character of Road Runner comes out very well. Fun, difficult and original."
