= Looney Tunes Racing =

2000 video game

- European Game Boy Color cover art
- Developers: Circus Freak Studios (PS1); Xantera (GBC)
- Publisher: Infogrames
- Producer: Caroline Esmurdoc (PS1)
- Designers: Simon Carless (PS1); Lorin Nelson (GBC)
- Programmers: Owen Flatley (PS1); Bryon Paul Hapgood (GBC); Kennett Galbraith (GBC); John Coffey (GBC)
- Artists: Lee Petty (PS1); Lorin Nelson (GBC)
- Composers: Anastasia Nikiforova (PS1); Brady Ellis (PS1); Chuck E. Myers (PS1); Tino Saiki (PS1); Tom Hopkins (PS1)
- Platforms: PlayStation; Game Boy Color
- Release: PlayStation: NA: November 28, 2000; EU: March 16, 2001; Game Boy Color: NA: December 22, 2000; EU: June 15, 2001
- Genre: Racing
- Modes: Single-player, multiplayer

Looney Tunes Racing is a kart racing video game released for the PlayStation and Game Boy Color and published by Infogrames. It was released in 2000 in North America and in 2001 in Europe.

== Gameplay ==
Looney Tunes Racing features different power-ups that are slightly unusual for the genre—instead of random pickups as in most racing games, racers collect tokens of various colors which are used to charge various power-ups. Six power-ups are available, and only the current level power-up may be activated. Also available are environmental hazards, triggered by driving through an 'ACME gag-activation arch', generally aimed further ahead on the track. Looney Tunes Racing features nineteen characters (six default characters and thirteen unlockable characters).

Looney Tunes Racing also features a unique soundtrack where the in-game music is randomly arranged using separate, randomized parts of each song in a three-segment pattern: A-A-B (segment A played twice and segment B played once, although some tracks like Desert Dash play the A segment once). Special segments are also played whenever the player goes uphill or downhill, runs over a boost pad, takes or loses the lead, and wins or loses a race.

=== Championship ===
The game features a season ('Championship') mode with three different levels, each with four (Rascal), five (Stinker), or six (Despicable) races. All tracks are unique. Each race features six racers, and awards ten points for finishing in first place, six points for second place, and four points for third place. Finishing in fourth place or lower requires the player to use a continue (of which they have three) to retry the race. Winning a championship unlocks a bonus level and a character. Winning the Despicable championship also leads to either a specific ending movie (for one of the starting characters) or a generic showing of the trophy (for the hidden ones). The ending movie shows the results of your character's wish, awarded by Smokey the genie (although he always congratulates them for winning 'the race', not the series).

=== Single Race ===
One can race on individual tracks, unlocked once they are won in 'Championship' mode. Also found here are three bonus levels won in 'Championship' mode.

=== Acme Challenge ===
These are fifteen special races divided into three 'floors' of five events each. The last event for each floor is a race on a short track against a secret character (Porky Pig, Elmer Fudd, or Gossamer). The other four events range from collecting icons (gather a certain number of icons around an arena) to racing with specific conditions (no brakes, for example) to time trials. Winning each event recovers an artifact from the museum. Each event can end with failure or a medal for success: bronze (minimum win), silver (slightly tougher), or gold (toughest). Winning a medal on each event unlocks the next floor; winning a medal on all events on the third floor unlocks the 'Challenge' ending movie, where the Acme museum is (temporarily) reopened.

=== Multiplayer ===
Two players can race, battle, or try 'Wacky', which brings up random events for the players. Note that in battle mode, the two most powerful power-ups are deactivated for battle events. For race events, the bonus levels are replaced by the short speedways used in the challenge events.

== Reception ==
Reception

Aggregate scores
Aggregator	Score	
Aggregator	GBC	PS
GameRankings	56%	74%
Metacritic	N/A	71/100

Review scores
Publication	Score	
Publication	GBC	PS
AllGame	N/A	3/5
Game Informer	4.25/10	6.25/10
GamePro	N/A	4/5
GameRevolution	N/A	B
GameSpot	5.9/10	6.3/10
GameZone	N/A	8.5/10
IGN	5/10	8.4/10
Nintendo Power	5.9/10	N/A
Official U.S. PlayStation Magazine	N/A	2.5/5

The PlayStation version received "average" reviews according to video game review aggregator Metacritic.
