= Bugs Bunny & Lola Bunny: Operation Carrot Patch =

- Developer: Velez & Dubail
- Publisher: Infogrames
- Producer: Yolanda Alonso
- Designers: Fernando Velez; Guillaume Dubail
- Programmer: Fernando Velez
- Artist: Guillaume Dubail
- Composer: Alberto Jose González
- Platform: Game Boy Color
- Release: NA: January 11, 1999; FRA: January 18, 1999; UK: January 1999
- Genre: Platform
- Mode: Single-player

Bugs Bunny & Lola Bunny: Operation Carrot Patch (Note: In-game English title in the European version: Bugs Bunny & Lola Bunny: Operation Carrots; title in North America: Looney Tunes: Carrot Crazy) is a 1998 Game Boy Color video game starring Bugs Bunny and Lola Bunny.

== Plot ==
Yosemite Sam, Daffy Duck, The Tasmanian Devil, Marvin the Martian and Elmer Fudd have stolen Bugs and Lola's carrots and hid them in different sets in the nearby studio. Bugs and Lola head through five different "sets" in order to reclaim them.

== Gameplay ==
In the game, Bugs and Lola can traverse two levels during the set, collecting carrots. Bugs and Lola have their abilities to jump and hit enemies with their hammers. Bugs is able to push items and dig underground, and Lola can slowly descend from heights with her umbrella. Collecting carrots enables Bugs and Lola to run in the air to gain more height with each jump. In addition, other special carrots allow Bugs and Lola to fly using their ears for a short time. To pass a stage, four pieces of a clapboard must be found.

The last level of each set sees the boss for the respective level chasing after Bugs, who must make it to the end of the level without falling victim to the various hazards in the way. Once the end of the level is reached, the boss will confront Bugs directly, and he must be beaten in order to progress. If Bugs and Lola collect all of the letters that makes the word "Extra" off of Tweety in a level, they can play a mini-game after clearing the level.

== Reception ==
Game review aggregation website GameRankings gave the game a rating of 76.00% based on three reviews. IGN gave it 8/10. French gaming website Jeuxvideo.com gave it 17/20. Los Angeles Times remarked "So far, it's the best side-scroller for Game Boy Color I've seen."
