= Speedy Gonzales: Aztec Adventure =

2000 video game

- Developer: Sunsoft
- Publisher: Sunsoft
- Platform: Game Boy Color
- Release: NA: January 2000; EU: 2000
- Genre: Platformer
- Mode: Single-player

Speedy Gonzales: Aztec Adventure is a 2000 video game developed and published by Sunsoft for the Game Boy Color. The game is a licensed platformer depicting the Looney Tunes animated cartoon character Speedy Gonzales, who the player controls across six stages set in Mexico. Upon release, Speedy Gonzales received average to mixed reviews, with critics praising the visual presentation of the game but faulting its platform gameplay mechanics, difficulty, and performance.

== Gameplay ==
Players collect cheese scattered throughout the level for points to gain bonus lives.

Playing as Speedy Gonzales, players must navigate platform levels to rescue mice and collect cheese taken by Sylvester the Cat. The game proceeds through eighteen stages set in six levels across Mexico, including a Mexican city and temple, and stages based around obstacles that include wind, water, fire, and jaguars. Players collect and use several weapons to defeat enemies, including a boomerang, smoke bomb, cheese balls that bounce through the level, and rolling fire. Players have four lives, with bonus lives collected throughout stages. The game features a password system upon the completion of levels to return to stages.

== Reception ==
Reception

Review scores
Publication	Score
AllGame	1.5/5
Hyper	4/10
IGN	6/10
Total Game Boy	75%

Aztec Adventure received average to mixed reviews upon release. Describing the game as "one of the best-looking Looney Tunes games on the platform, Total Game Boy praised the game's sense of speed and compared it to the Sonic The Hedgehog series of video games. Alec Matias of IGN commended the game's "beautiful backgrounds and intricate level designs" and "well-animated" characters, but found the game to have an "abundance of minor flaws", citing the game's "faulty design", difficulty, lack of lives, inability to render multiple enemies on a screen without slowdown, and "annoying" music. Frank Dry of Hyper similarly praised the animations and "lush" backgrounds, but expressed annoyance with the game's difficulty, fast-paced puzzles, and level design. Jon Thompson of Allgame found the game to be "visually enticing" and "nicely detailed", but also found the game to be "extremely challenging" due to its hard boss fights, difficult controls, precise platforming, limited lives and poor performance.
