= Tasmanian Devil: Munching Madness =

1999 video game

- Developer: M4 Ltd.
- Publisher: Sunsoft
- Platform: Game Boy Color
- Release: 1999
- Genre: Platform
- Mode: Single player

Tasmanian Devil: Munching Madness is a video game developed by the British studio M4 Ltd. and released by Sunsoft in 1999 for the Game Boy Color. The game stars the Looney Tunes character Tasmanian Devil.

== Gameplay ==
The game is a platform game played from an overhead perspective. Players take control of Taz to eat all the food in each of the nine worlds - Tasmania, Australia, China, Greece, Switzerland, Amsterdam, Amazon River, Las Vegas and finally Transylvania in Romania. On the way, players must also collect medallions and attack enemies by using Taz's signature spin or by spitting.
