= Daffy Duck: Fowl Play =

1999 video game

- Developers: Sunsoft; SANTACLAUS
- Publisher: Sunsoft
- Director: Kiharu Yoshida
- Designer: Michio Okasaka
- Programmer: Michio Okasaka
- Artists: Mayson Dassy; Y. Oku; Motoko Saito; Esemaro
- Composers: Atsushi Takada; Satoshi Asano
- Platforms: Game Boy, Game Boy Color
- Release: NA: December 1999; JP: January 1, 2000; EU: 2000
- Genre: Platformer
- Mode: Single-player

Daffy Duck: Fowl Play (japanese: Daffy Duck: Subette Koron de Oogane Mochi (ダフィー・ダック すべってころんで大金持ち)) is a 2D platform video game featuring the Looney Tunes character Daffy Duck. It was released for the Game Boy Color in 1999 in North America and 2000 in Japan and Europe. The game is compatible with the original Game Boy.

== Plot and gameplay ==
Daffy wants to become rich so he joins Bugs Bunny on a treasure hunt. The player controls Daffy and navigates him through 6 levels in total. He can use dynamite to take out enemies and obstacles. At the end of each level, Bugs must be faced in order to progress to the next one. A password system is used to save progress. A minigame is played after clearing a level.

== Reception ==
French gaming website Jeuxvideo.com gave it a rating of 13/20. Total Game Boy Color gave it 88%.
