= List of Infogrames video games =

This is a list of video games produced or published under the Infogrames name. These titles were produced until 2003, when its owner Infogrames Entertainment SA restructured and adopted Atari branding, as well as new titles since the brand's resurrection by the same company in 2024. See also list of Atari video games (2001–present).

== 1984 ==
Game	Released	Developer	Platform	Note
Mandragore	1984	Infogrames Multimedia	Apple II, Commodore 64, MSX, Thomson MO5, Thomson TO7/70, ZX Spectrum	

== 1992 ==
Game	Released	Developer	Platform	Note
Alone in the Dark	1992	Infogrames Multimedia	MS-DOS	
Alone in the Dark	1992	Krisalis	3DO	
Eternam	1992	Infogrames Multimedia	MS-DOS	
Eternam	1993	Infogrames Multimedia	FM Towns	

== 1993 ==
Game	Released	Developer	Platform	Note
Alone In the Dark 2	1993 September 25, 1994 (North America)	Infogrames Multimedia Krisalis (3DO)	MS-DOS, PC-98, FM Towns, 3DO, Sega Saturn. PlayStation	
Shadow of the Comet	March 25, 1993	Infogrames Multimedia	MS-DOS, PC-98, Linux	North American release published by I•Motion
The Smurfs	1993	Infogrames Multimedia	Game Boy	

== 1994 ==
Game	Released	Developer	Platform	Note
The Smurfs	1994	Infogrames Multimedia	Super Nintendo Entertainment System, Nintendo Entertainment System, Game Gear	

== 1995 ==
Game	Released	Developer	Platform	Note
Spirou	September 20, 1995	Infogrames Multimedia	Sega Mega Drive	
Spirou	September 29, 1996	Infogrames Multimedia	Super Nintendo Entertainment System, Game Boy, Microsoft Windows, MS-DOS	
Tintin in Tibet	December 1995	Infogrames Multimedia	Super Nintendo Entertainment System	
Time Gate: Knight's Chase	December 1995	Infogrames Multimedia	Microsoft Windows, MS-DOS, Macintosh	
The Smurfs	1995	Infogrames Multimedia	Mega Drive, Master System, Sega Mega CD	Port to Sega systems

== 1996 ==
Game	Released	Developer	Platform	Note
Tintin in Tibet	1996	Infogrames Multimedia	Sega Mega Drive	
Tintin in Tibet	1996	East Point Software	Microsoft Windows	
Tintin in Tibet	1996	Bit Managers	Game Boy, Game Gear	Game Boy Color version released in 2001
Alone in the Dark: Jack is Back	May 3, 1996 (Europe); August 22, 1996 (North America)	Infogrames Multimedia	PlayStation, Sega Saturn	Released as Alone in the Dark: One-Eyed Jack's Revenge in North America, and distributed by Interplay.
Chaos Control	September 1996 (Europe); November 22, 1996 (Japan)	Infogrames Multimedia	Sega Saturn	Enhanced port of the CD-I/MS-DOS game. Released as Chaos Control Remix in Japan, and published by Virgin Interactive Entertainment in the country.
Chaos Control Remix	November 22, 1996 (Japan)	Infogrames Multimedia	PlayStation	Enhanced port of the CD-I/MS-DOS game. Released only in Japan, published by Virgin Interactive Entertainment.
The Smurfs	1996	Infogrames Multimedia	MS-DOS, Windows 95	PC port

== 1997 ==
Game	Released	Developer	Platform	Note
Mega Man 8	February 28, 1997 (Europe)	Capcom	PlayStation	Released only in Europe.
V-Rally	July 4, 1997 (Europe); November 4, 1997 (North America)	Infogrames Multimedia	PlayStation	Published by Electronic Arts in North America as Need for Speed: V-Rally
Motor Mash	November 1997	Eutechnyx	PlayStation, Microsoft Windows, MS-DOS	
Prisoner of Ice: Jashin Kourin	December 1997 (Japan)	Infogrames Multimedia	PlayStation, Sega Saturn	Enhanced Japanese-only console port of Prisoner of Ice. Published by Xing Entertainment.

== 1998 ==
Game	Released	Developer	Platform	Note
Mega Man: Battle & Chase	April 3, 1998 (Europe)	Capcom	PlayStation	Released only in Europe.
Lucky Luke	May 1998 (Europe); November 1998 (North America)	Infogrames Multimedia	PlayStation	Released only in Europe. Branded under Ocean label
V-Rally	July 3, 1998 (Europe)	Velez & Dubail	Game Boy	Released only in Europe. Branded under Ocean label
Viper	July 1998 (Europe)	X-Ample Architectures	PlayStation	Released only in Europe. Branded under Ocean label
Snow Racer 98	July 1998 (Europe)	PAM Development	PlayStation	Released only in Europe. Branded under Ocean label
Mission: Impossible	July 16, 1998 (North America); September 25, 1998 (Europe)	Infogrames	Nintendo 64	Branded under Ocean label.
Heart of Darkness	July 31, 1998 (Europe)	Amazing Studio	PlayStation, Microsoft Windows	Published in Europe only. Branded under Ocean label
Breath of Fire III	October 8, 1998 (Europe)		PlayStation	Released only in Europe.
V-Rally: Edition '99	11 December 1998 (Europe); September 15, 1999 (North America)	Eden Studios	Nintendo 64	Enhanced port of V-Rally.

== 1999 ==
Game	Released	Developer	Platform	Note
C3 Racing	January 15, 1999 (Europe)	Eutechnyx	PlayStation	Published in Europe only.
Asterix: The Gallic War	March 15, 1999 (Europe)	Sourcery Development	PlayStation	Released only in Europe.
Radikal Bikers	May 23, 1999 (Europe)	Bit Managers	PlayStation	Released only in Europe.
V-Rally 2: Championship Edition	June 25, 1999 (Europe); November 17, 1999 (North America)	Eden Studios	PlayStation	Released in North America as Need for Speed: V-Rally 2
Bugs Bunny: Lost in Time	June 29, 1999 (Europe); July 1, 1999 (North America)	Behaviour Interactive	PlayStation	
V-Rally: Multiplayer Championship Edition	June 1999	Infogrames Multimedia	Microsoft Windows	Released only in Europe.
Demolition Racer	August 31, 1999 (Europe); September 28, 1999 (North America)	Pitbull Syndicate	PlayStation	
Millennium Soldier: Expendable	1999 (Europe); 1999 (North America)	Rage Software	Microsoft Windows	Originally released in Japan by Imagineeer. Released as simply Expandable in North America
Millennium Soldier: Expendable	September 9, 1999 (North America); October 14, 1999 (Europe)	Rage Software	Dreamcast	Originally released in Japan by Imagineeer. Released as simply Expandable in North America
Pen Pen TriIcelon	September 9, 1999 (North America); November 12, 1999 (Europe)	General Entertainment	Dreamcast	Originally released in Japan by General Entertainment. Released as simply Pen Pen in Europe.
The Smurfs	October 6, 1999 (Europe); December 14, 1999 (North America)	Heliogame Production	PlayStation	
UEFA Striker	October 10, 1999 (Europe); April 2000 (North America)	Rage Software	PlayStation	Released as Striker Pro 2000 in North America.
Bugs Bunny: Lost in Time	October 19, 1999 (North America); 1999 (Europe)	Behaviour Interactive	Microsoft Windows	
Demolition Racer	October 19, 1999 (North America); February 1, 2000 (Europe)	Pitbull Syndicate	Microsoft Windows	
Mission: Impossible	October 29, 1999 (Europe); November 22, 1999 (North America)	Infogrames	PlayStation	
Test Drive 6	October 31, 1999 (North America)	Pitbull Syndicate	PlayStation, Microsoft Windows	Published by Cryo Interactive in Europe.
Test Drive Off-Road 3	October 31, 1999 (North America); April 19, 2000 (Europe)	Pitbull Syndicate	PlayStation, Microsoft Windows	Released as 4X4 World Trophy in Europe. Windows version released only in North America.
Worms Pinball	November 1, 1999 (Europe)	Team17	PlayStation	European-only console port of Addiction Pinball.
Slave Zero	November 16, 1999 (North America); March 24, 2000 (Europe)	Infogrames North America	Dreamcast	Published by Sega in North America.
PGA European Tour Golf	November 18, 1999	Gremlin Interactive	PlayStation	Released only in Europe.
Le Mans 24 Hours	November 26, 1999 (Europe); May 4, 2000 (North America)	Eutechnyx	PlayStation	Released as Test Drive Le Mans in North America
UEFA Striker	November 26, 1999 (Europe); May 9, 2000 (North America)	Rage Software	Dreamcast	Released as Striker Pro 2000 in North America.
Test Drive 6	December 15, 1999 (North America)	Pitbull Syndicate	Dreamcast	Released only in North America.
Ronaldo V-Football	1999 (Europe); June 2001 (North America)	Bit Managers	Game Boy Color	Released as Ronaldo V-Soccer in North America.

== 2000 ==
Game	Released	Developer	Platform	Note
Eagle One: Harrier Attack	January 28, 2000 (Europe); March 31, 2000 (North America)	Glass Ghost	PlayStation	
Le Mans 24 Hours	March 29, 2000 (North America); August 4, 2000 (Europe)	Eutechnyx	Microsoft Windows	Released as Test Drive Le Mans in North America
Premier Manager 2000	March 31, 2000 (Europe)	Infogrames Sheffield House	PlayStation	Released only in Europe.
Millennium Soldier: Expendable	April 20, 2000 (Europe); April 25, 2000 (North America)	Rage Software	PlayStation	Originally released in Japan by Imagineeer. Released as simply Expandable in North America
Gekido	April 2000 (Europe)	NAPS team	PlayStation	North American publishing rights only.
NGEN Racing	May 12, 2000 (Europe); June 20, 2000 (North America)	Curly Monsters	PlayStation	
Ronaldo V-Football	May 20, 2000 (Europe)	PAM Development	PlayStation	Released only in Europe.
V-Rally 2: Expert Edition	May 25, 2000 (Europe); October 17, 2000 (North America)	Eden Studios	Dreamcast	Released as Test Drive V-Rally In North America
Wacky Races	June 9, 2000 (North America); June 30, 2000 (Europe)	Velez & Dubail	Game Boy Color	
PGA European Tour Golf	May 2000 (Europe); June 15, 2000 (North America)	Infogrames Sheffield House	Nintendo 64	Released as PGA European Tour in North America
Le Mans 24 Hours	June 28, 2000 (North America); 14 December 2000 (Europe)	Velez & Dubail	Game Boy Color	Released as Test Drive Le Mans in North America
Wacky Races	June 28, 2000 (North America); June 30, 2000 (Europe)	Infogrames Sheffield House	Dreamcast	
Koudelka	June 29, 2000 (North America); September 27, 2000 (Europe)	Sacnoth	PlayStation	North American and European publishing rights. Originally published by SNK.
Michelin Rally Masters: Race of Champions	July 25, 2000 (Europe); September 26, 2000 (North America)	Digital Illusions CE	Microsoft Windows	
Duck Dodgers Starring Daffy Duck	August 15, 2000 (North America); October 27, 2000 (Europe)	Paradigm Entertainment	Nintendo 64	
Hogs of War	August 25, 2000 (Europe); September 29, 2000 (North America)	Infogrames Sheffield House	PlayStation	
Wacky Races	September 15, 2000 (Europe); January 2001 (North America); July 26, 2001 (Japan)	Appaloosa Interactive	PlayStation, Microsoft Windows	PlayStation version only in Europe and Japan
The Ring: Terror's Realm	September 26, 2000 (North America)	Asmik Ace	Dreamcast	Localisation and North American-only version of the Japanese Dreamcast game Ring.
Michelin Rally Masters: Race of Champions	October 13, 2000 (Europe); October 24, 2000 (North America)	Digital Illusions CE	PlayStation	
Wacky Races	October 19, 2000 (Europe)	Appaloosa Interactive	PlayStation	Was not released in North America.
Unreal Tournament	October 26, 2000 (North America); April 20, 2001 (Europe)	Epic Games; Digital Extremes	PlayStation 2	
Demolition Racer: No Exit	October 24, 2000 (North America)	Pitbull Syndicate	Dreamcast	Enhanced port of Demolition Racer. Released only in North America.
Beach Volleyball	October 27, 2000 (Europe); November 21, 2000 (North America)	Carapace Game Development	PlayStation	Released as Power Spike: Pro Beach Volleyball in North America.
Looney Tunes: Space Race	November 3, 2000 (Europe); November 28, 2000 (North America)	Infogrames Melbourne House	Dreamcast	
Hogs of War	November 3, 2000 (Europe)	Infogrames Sheffield House	Microsoft Windows	Released only in Europe.
Real Pool	November 6, 2000 (North America)	Astroll	PlayStation 2	Retooling of Windows/Mac title of the same name. North American publishing rights only.
Le Mans 24 Hours	November 8, 2000 (North America); November 17, 2000 (Europe)	Infogrames Melbourne House	Dreamcast	Released as Test Drive Le Mans in North America
Driver 2	November 14, 2000 (North America); November 17, 2000 (Europe)	Reflections Interactive	PlayStation	
Bugs Bunny & Taz: Time Busters	November 24, 2000 (North America); November 24, 2000 (Europe)	Artificial Mind & Movement	PlayStation	
Xtreme Sports	November 28, 2000 (North America)	Innerloop	Dreamcast	North American publishing rights only. Published by Sega elsewhere.
Looney Tunes Racing	November 28, 2000 (North America); March 16, 2001 (Europe)	Circus Freak Studios	PlayStation	
UEFA Dream Soccer	December 8, 2000 (Europe)	Silicon Dreams	Dreamcast	Licensing only, published by Sega.
Looney Tunes Racing	December 21, 2000 (North America); June 15, 2001 (Europe)	Xantera	Game Boy Color	
Beach 'n Ball	December 21, 2000 (North America)	Spark Creative	Game Boy Color	Released as Power Spike: Pro Beach Volleyball in North America.
Lucky Luke: On the Daltans' Trail	2000 (Europe)	Infogrames	Microsoft Windows	Released only in Europe.
Asterix: The Gallic War	2000 (Europe)	Sourcery Development	Microsoft Windows	Released only in Europe.

== 2001 ==
Game	Released	Developer	Platform	Note
Pajama Sam: You Are What You Eat from Your Head to Your Feet	January 31, 2001 (Europe); December 7, 2001 (North America)	Runecraft	PlayStation	Port of the PC title
Unreal Tournament	March 13, 2001 (North America); June 29, 2001 (Europe)	Secret Level, Inc.	Dreamcast	
3,2, 1: Smurf! - My First Racing Game	March 29, 2001 (Europe); April 1, 2001 (North America)	Artificial Mind & Movement	PlayStation	Released as Smurf Racer! in North America.
UEFA Challenge	April 27, 2001 (Europe)	Infogrames Sheffield House	PlayStation, Microsoft Windows	Released only in Europe.
Power Spike: Pro Beach Volleyball	May 9, 2001 (North America)	Carapace Game Development	Microsoft Windows	Released only in North America.
Alone in the Dark: The New Nightmare	May 18, 2001 (Europe); June 18, 2001 (North America)	Darkworks	PlayStation	
NASCAR Heat 2002	June 18, 2001 (North America)	Monster Games	PlayStation 2	Released only in North America.
Motor Mayhem	June 20, 2001 (North America); November 23, 2001 (Europe)	Beyond Games	PlayStation 2	
Le Mans 24 Hours	June 22, 2001 (Europe); August 13, 2001 (North America)	Infogrames Melbourne House	PlayStation 2	
Alone in the Dark: The New Nightmare	June 22, 2001 (Europe); September 24, 2001 (North America)	Darkworks	Dreamcast	
Alone in the Dark: The New Nightmare	June 22, 2001 (Europe); June 25, 2001 (North America)	Spiral House	Microsoft Windows	
Atari Anniversary Edition	June 29, 2001 (North America); March 1, 2002 (Europe)	Digital Eclipse	Enhanced version of Atari Arcade Hits	
UEFA Challenge	June 29, 2001 (Europe)	Infogrames Sheffield House	PlayStation 2	Released only in Europe.
Atari Anniversary Edition	July 4, 2001 (North America)	Digital Eclipse	Dreamcast	Released only in North America.
Wacky Races: Starring Dastardly and Muttley	June 29, 2001 (Europe)	Infogrames Sheffield House	PlayStation 2	Released only in Europe. Enhanced port of the Dreamcast version of Wacky Races
Asterix: Mega Madness	June 29, 2001 (Europe)	Unique Development Studios	PlayStation, Microsoft Windows	Released only in Europe.
Test Drive Off-Road Wide Open	August 24, 2001 (North America); November 23, 2001 (Europe)	Angel Studios	PlayStation 2	Released as Off-Road Wide Open in Europe.
Nicktoons Racing	September 7, 2001 (North America); November 30, 2001 (Europe)	Creations	PlayStation	
Sheep, Dog 'n' Wolf	September 7, 2001 (Europe); September 28, 2001 (North America)	Infogrames Lyon House	PlayStation	Known as Looney Tunes: Sheep Raider in North America
Nicktoons: Nick Tunes	September 13, 2001 (North America)	ImaginEngine	Microsoft Windows	Includes a microphone
Tintin: Destination Adventure	September 21, 2001 (Europe)	Runecraft	PlayStation	Released only in Europe.
Backyard Soccer	September 23, 2001 (Europe); September 28, 2001 (North America)	Runecraft	PlayStation	Released as Junior Sports Football in Europe. Port of the PC game
Alone in the Dark: The New Nightmare	September 28, 2001 (Europe)	Spiral House	PlayStation 2	Released only in Europe.
MX Rider	October 26, 2001 (Europe); October 30, 2001 (North America)	Paradigm Entertainment	PlayStation 2	Released under Atari banner.
Men in Black: The Series – Crashdown	November 2, 2001 (North America and Europe)	Runecraft	PlayStation	
Lucky Luke: Western Fever	November 2, 2001 (Europe)	Kalisto Entertainment	PlayStation, Microsoft Windows	Released only in Europe.
Lucky Luke: Wanted!	November 2, 2001 (Europe)	WizardSoft	Game Boy Advance	Released only in Europe.
Deadly Dozen	November 2, 2001 (North America and Europe)	nFusion Interactive	Microsoft Windows	
Splashdown	November 5, 2001 (North America); November 9, 2001 (Europe)	Rainbow Studios	PlayStation 2	Released under Atari banner.
Oddworld: Munch's Oddysee	November 15, 2001 (North America); March 14, 2002 (Europe)	Oddworld Inhabitants	Xbox	Licensing only, published by Microsoft Game Studios.
TransWorld Surf	November 15, 2001 (North America); March 14, 2002 (Europe)	Angel Studios	Xbox	Released under Atari banner.
Test Drive Off-Road Wide Open	November 15, 2001 (North America); May 24, 2002 (Europe)	Angel Studios	Xbox	Released as Off-Road Wide Open in Europe. Enhanced port of PS2 version
NASCAR Heat 2002	November 15, 2001 (North America)	Monster Games	Xbox	Released only in North America.
Family Fortunes	November 23, 2001 (United Kingdom)	Artech Studios	Microsoft Windows	Released only in the United Kingdom.
Atari Anniversary Edition Redux	November 26, 2001 (North America); March 1, 2002 (Europe)	Digital Eclipse	PlayStation	Released under Atari banner in Europe.
Mr. Nutz	Unknown 2001 (Europe)	Dream On Studio	Game Boy Advance	Released only in Europe.

== 2002 ==
Game	Released	Developer	Platform	Note
Asterix & Obelix: Bash Them All!	January 25, 2002 (Europe)	Bit Managers	Game Boy Advance	Released exclusively in Europe. Contains a GBA port of Asterix & Obelix and a new title - Asterix & Cleopatra
Space Race	February 8, 2002 (North America); May 27, 2002 (North America)	Infogrames Melbourne House	PlayStation 2	Enhanced port of Looney Tunes: Space Race
Atari Anniversary Advance	February 14, 2002 (Europe); March 25, 2003 (North America)	Digital Eclipse	Game Boy Advance	
World of Outlaws: Sprint Cars 2002	March 26, 2002 (North America)	Ratbag Games	PlayStation 2	North American publishing rights only
Klonoa: Empire of Dreams	March 29, 2002 (Europe)	Now Production	Game Boy Advance	European publishing rights only.
Tekken Advance	March 29, 2002 (Europe)	Eighting	Game Boy Advance	European publishing rights only.
Blender Bros.	April 15, 2002 (North America)	Hudson Soft	Game Boy Advance	Released exclusively in North America.
TransWorld Surf	April 30, 2002 (North America); October 4, 2002 (Europe)	Angel Studios	PlayStation 2	Released under Atari banner.
NASCAR Heat 2002	May 6, 2002 (North America)	Crawfish Interactive	Game Boy Advance	Released exclusively in North America.
Dragon Ball Z: The Legacy of Goku	May 14, 2002 (North America); October 4, 2002 (Europe)	Webfoot Technologies	Game Boy Advance	
TD Overdrive: The Brotherhood of Speed	May 27, 2002 (North America); July 5, 2002 (Europe)	Pitbull Syndicate	PlayStation 2, Xbox	Released as Test Drive in North America. Released under Atari banner.
Dragon Ball Z: Collectable Card Game	May 31, 2002 (North America)	ImaginEngine	Game Boy Advance	Released exclusively in North America.
Backyard Baseball	May 31, 2002 (North America)	Game Brains	Game Boy Advance	Released exclusively in North America.
Nicktoons Racing	June 14, 2002 (North America); September 6, 2002 (Europe)	Crawfish Interactive	Game Boy Advance	
V-Rally 3	June 21, 2002 (Europe); September 30, 2002 (North America)	Velez & Dubail	Game Boy Advance	Released under Atari banner.
V-Rally 3	June 21, 2002 (Europe); October 22, 2002 (North America)	Eden Studios	PlayStation 2	Released under Atari banner.
Stuntman	June 25, 2002 (North America); September 6, 2002 (Europe)	Reflections Interactive	PlayStation 2	Released under Atari banner.
Splashdown	June 25, 2002 (North America); August 30, 2002 (Europe)	Rainbow Studios	Xbox	Released under Atari banner.
Men in Black II: Alien Escape	June 28, 2002 (North America); July 19, 2002 (Europe)	Infogrames Melbourne House	PlayStation 2	
Hero X	June 28, 2002	Amazing Games	Microsoft Windows	
Slam Tennis	August 2, 2002 (Europe)	Infogrames Sheffield House	PlayStation 2	Released only in Europe.
Slam Tennis	August 2, 2002 (Europe)	Infogrames Sheffield House	Xbox	Released only in Europe.
Big Air Freestyle	September 13, 2002 (North America); November 8, 2002 (Europe)	Paradigm Entertainment	GameCube	Unbranded and enhanced port of MX Rider. Contains a demo for Godzilla: Destroy All Monsters Melee.
Loons: The Fight for Fame	September 15, 2002 (North America); September 27, 2002 (Europe)	Warthog Games	Xbox	
Taz: Wanted	September 18, 2002 (North America); September 27, 2002 (Europe)	Blitz Games	PlayStation 2	
Taz: Wanted	September 18, 2002 (North America); September 27, 2002 (Europe)	Blitz Games	Xbox	
Taz: Wanted	September 27, 2002 (Europe); October 1, 2002 (North America)	Blitz Games	Microsoft Windows	
Taz: Wanted	October 4, 2002 (Europe); October 10, 2002 (North America)	Blitz Games	GameCube	
The Terminator: Dawn of Fate	September 18, 2002 (North America); October 25, 2002 (Europe)	Paradigm Entertainment	PlayStation 2	Released under Atari banner.
The Terminator: Dawn of Fate	September 18, 2002 (North America); October 25, 2002 (Europe)	Paradigm Entertainment	Xbox	Released under Atari banner.
Superman: Shadow of Apokolips	September 25, 2002 (North America); November 15, 2002 (Europe)	Infogrames Sheffield House	PlayStation 2	Released under Atari banner.
Backyard Football	September 25, 2002 (North America)	Torus Games	Game Boy Advance	Released exclusively in North America.
Driver 2 Advance	October 4, 2002 (Europe); October 22, 2002 (North America)	Sennari Interactive	Game Boy Advance	Released under Atari banner.
Godzilla: Destroy All Monsters Melee	October 8, 2002 (North America); November 15, 2002 (Europe); December 12, 2002 (Japan)	Pipeworks Software	GameCube	Released under Atari banner.
Backyard Football	October 10, 2002 (North America)	Humongous Entertainment	GameCube	Released only in North America.
The Revenge of the Smurfs	October 11, 2002 (Europe)	Bit Managers	Game Boy Advance	Released exclusively in Europe. GBA port of The Smurfs
Monopoly Party	October 29, 2002 (North America); November 29, 2002 (Europe)	Runecraft	Xbox	
Monopoly Party	November 12, 2002 (North America); December 6, 2002 (Europe)	Runecraft	PlayStation 2	
Monopoly Party	November 19, 2002 (North America); February 28, 2003 (Europe)	Runecraft	GameCube	
Transworld Snowboarding	October 29, 2002 (North America); November 15, 2002 (Europe)	Housemarque	Xbox	Released under Atari banner.
Nickelodeon Party Blast	October 29, 2002 (North America); December 6, 2002 (Europe)	Data Design Interactive	Xbox	
Nickelodeon Party Blast	October 29, 2002 (North America); December 6, 2002 (Europe)	Data Design Interactive	GameCube	
Nickelodeon Party Blast	October 29, 2002 (North America); December 6, 2002 (Europe)	Data Design Interactive	Microsoft Windows	
Zapper: One Wicked Cricket	November 4, 2002 (North America); March 14, 2003 (Europe)	Blitz Games	PlayStation 2	
Zapper: One Wicked Cricket	November 4, 2002 (North America); March 14, 2003 (Europe)	Blitz Games	Xbox	
Zapper: One Wicked Cricket	November 4, 2002 (North America); March 14, 2003 (Europe)	Blitz Games	GameCube	
Zapper: One Wicked Cricket	November 4, 2002 (North America); March 14, 2003 (Europe)	Blitz Games	Microsoft Windows	
Zapper: One Wicked Cricket	November 4, 2002 (North America); March 14, 2003 (Europe)	Atomic Planet Entertainment	Game Boy Advance	
Dungeons and Dragons: Eye of the Beholder	November 8, 2002 (North America); November 22, 2002 (Europe)	Pronto Games	Game Boy Advance	
Micro Machines	November 8, 2002 (Europe); March 19, 2003 (North America)	Infogrames Sheffield House	PlayStation 2	Released under Atari banner in Europe. US release was exclusively sold at Toys 'R' Us stores
Micro Machines	November 8, 2002 (Europe)	Infogrames Sheffield House	Xbox	Released under Atari banner. Released exclusively in Europe.
Godzilla: Domination!	November 12, 2002 (North America); November 15, 2002 (Europe)	WayForward Technologies	Game Boy Advance	Released under Atari banner.
Unreal Championship	November 12, 2002 (North America); November 29, 2002 (Europe)	Epic Games; Digital Extremes	Xbox	Released under Atari banner.
Superman: The Man of Steel	November 19, 2002 (North America); December 13, 2002 (Europe)	Circus Freak	Xbox	Released under Atari banner.
Grand Prix Challenge	November 22, 2002 (Europe); March 3, 2003 (North America)	Infogrames Melbourne House	PlayStation 2	Released under Atari banner.
NASCAR: Dirt to Daytona	November 27, 2002 (North America)	Monster Games	PlayStation 2	Released only in North America.
NASCAR: Dirt to Daytona	November 27, 2002 (North America)	Monster Games	GameCube	Released only in North America.
Titeuf: Ze Gag Machine	November 29, 2002 (Europe)	3D Lights	Game Boy Advance	Released only in Europe.
Dragon Ball Z: Budokai	December 3, 2002 (North America)	Dimps	PlayStation 2	North American publishing rights only.
Final Fantasy IX	2002 (Europe)	Square	PlayStation	European publishing rights to Platinum re-release

== 2003 ==
Game	Released	Developer	Platform	Note
Ikaruga	January 16, 2003 (Japan); April 15, 2003 (North America); May 23, 2003 (Europe)	Treasure	GameCube	Released under Atari banner.
Micro Machines	January 17, 2003 (Europe)	Infogrames Sheffield House	GameCube	Released only in Europe. Released under Atari banner.
Battle Engine Aquila	January 19, 2003 (North America); February 28, 2003 (Europe)	Lost Toys	PlayStation 2	Released under Atari banner.
Battle Engine Aquila	January 19, 2003 (North America); February 28, 2003 (Europe)	Lost Toys	Xbox	Released under Atari banner.
Furious Karting	January 24, 2003 (Europe); March 28, 2003 (North America)	Babylon Software	Xbox	Released under Atari banner.
Men in Black II: Alien Escape	February 7, 2003 (Europe); February 27, 2003 (North America)	Infogrames Melbourne House; Torus Games (Porter)	GameCube	
Racing Evoluzione	February 18, 2003 (North America); February 28, 2003 (Europe)	Milestone	Xbox	Released under Atari banner.
Final Fantasy Origins	March 14, 2003 (Europe)	TOSE	PlayStation	European publishing rights only
TransWorld Surf: Next Wave	March 18, 2003 (North America)	Angel Studios	GameCube	Released only in North America. Released under Atari banner.
Dragon Ball Z: Ultimate Battle 22	March 25, 2003 (North America)	TOSE	PlayStation	North American publishing rights only.
Superman: Shadow of Apokolips	March 25, 2003 (North America); May 2, 2003 (Europe)	Infogrames Sheffield House	GameCube	Released under Atari banner.
RollerCoaster Tycoon	March 25, 2003 (North America and Europe)	Frontier Developments	Xbox	Console port of the original Windows game. Includes both expansion packs
V-Rally 3	March 25, 2003 (North America); March 28, 2003 (Europe)	Eden Studios	Xbox	Released under Atari banner.
Backyard Baseball	March 31, 2003 (North America)	Humongous Entertainment	GameCube	Released only in North America.
Final Fantasy Origins	April 8, 2003 (Europe)	TOSE	PlayStation	European publishing rights only
Godzilla: Destroy All Monsters Melee	April 16, 2003 (North America)	Pipeworks Software	Xbox	Released only in North America, although European copies exist. Released under Atari banner.
Ghost Vibration	May 9, 2003 (Europe)	Artoon	PlayStation 2	European publishing rights only. Released under Atari banner.
Enter the Matrix	May 14, 2003 (North America); May 15, 2003 (Europe)	Shiny Entertainment	PlayStation 2	Released under Atari banner.
Enter the Matrix	May 14, 2003 (North America); May 15, 2003 (Europe)	Shiny Entertainment	Xbox	Released under Atari banner.
Enter the Matrix	May 14, 2003 (North America); May 15, 2003 (Europe)	Shiny Entertainment	GameCube	Released under Atari banner.
Enter the Matrix	May 14, 2003 (North America); May 15, 2003 (Europe)	Shiny Entertainment	Microsoft Windows	Released under Atari banner.
V-Rally 3	June 25, 2003 (Europe); July 10, 2003 (Japan)	Eden Studios	GameCube	Only released in Europe and Japan. Released under Atari banner.

== 2024 ==
Game	Released	Developer	Platform	Publisher/Label	Note
Totally Reliable Delivery Service	April 23, 2024 (acquisition) April 1, 2020 (original release)	We're Five Games	Microsoft Windows, MacOS, PlayStation 4, Xbox One, Nintendo Switch, iOS, Android	Infogrames	Acquired from tinyBuild, first title under the relaunched Infogrames banner.
Surgeon Simulator	June 26, 2024 (acquisition) April 19, 2013 (original release)	Bossa Studios	Microsoft Windows, OS X, Linux, iOS, PlayStation 4, Android, Nintendo Switch	Infogrames	Acquired from tinyBuild
Surgeon Simulator 2	June 26, 2024 (acquisition) August 27, 2020 (original release)	Bossa Studios	Microsoft Windows, Xbox One, Xbox Series X/S	Infogrames	Acquired from tinyBuild

== Distribution only ==
Title	Platform(s)	Release date	Publisher(s)	Region
Rushdown	PlayStation	1999	Canal+ Multimedia	Europe
V-Ball: Beach Volley Heroes	PlayStation	1999	Funsoft	France
Player Manager Ninety-Nine	PlayStation	1999	Anco Software	United Kingdom
Iron Aces	Dreamcast	February 7, 2001	Xicat Interactive	North America

=== Sega titles ===
Title	Platform(s)	Release date	Publisher(s)	Region
ChuChu Rocket!	Game Boy Advance	December 7, 2001	Sega	Europe
Columns Crown	Game Boy Advance	December 7, 2001	Sega	Europe
Sonic Advance	Game Boy Advance	March 8, 2002	Sega	Europe
Jet Set Radio Future	Xbox	March 14, 2002	Sega	Europe
Puyo Pop	Game Boy Advance	April 2, 2002	Sega	Europe
Sonic Adventure 2: Battle	GameCube	May 3, 2002	Sega	Europe
Super Monkey Ball	GameCube	May 3, 2002	Sega	Europe
Gunvalkyrie	Xbox	May 17, 2002	Sega	Europe
Virtua Striker 3 ver. 2002	GameCube	May 24, 2002	Sega	Europe
Crazy Taxi 3	Xbox	September 20, 2002	Sega	Europe
Beach Spikers: Virtua Beach Volleyball	GameCube	September 27, 2002	Sega	Europe
Sega Soccer Slam	Xbox	October 11, 2002	Sega	Europe
Sega Soccer Slam	GameCube	October 18, 2002	Sega	Europe
Sega Soccer Slam	PlayStation 2	October 25, 2002	Sega	Europe
The Pinball of the Dead	Game Boy Advance	October 25, 2002	Sega	Europe
Sega GT 2002	Xbox	November 8, 2002	Sega	Europe
Altered Beast: Guardian of the Realms	Game Boy Advance	2003	Sega	Europe
Super Monkey Ball 2	GameCube	March 1, 2003	Sega	Europe
Sonic Mega Collection	GameCube	March 7, 2003	Sega	Europe
Phantasy Star Online Episode I & II	GameCube	March 7, 2003	Sega	Europe
Phantasy Star Collection	Game Boy Advance	March 7, 2003	Sega	Europe
Shining Soul	Game Boy Advance	March 7, 2003	Sega	Europe
Virtua Tennis	Game Boy Advance	March 7, 2003	Sega	Europe
The House of the Dead III	Xbox	March 14, 2003	Sega	Europe
Panzer Dragoon Orta	Xbox	March 21, 2003	Sega	Europe
Sonic Advance 2	Game Boy Advance	March 28, 2003	Sega	Europe
NBA 2K3	PlayStation 2, GameCube	March 28, 2003	Sega	Europe
NFL 2K3	PlayStation 2, GameCube	March 28, 2003	Sega	Europe
NHL 2K3	PlayStation 2, GameCube	March 28, 2003	Sega	Europe
Super Monkey Ball Jr.	Game Boy Advance	April 4, 2003	Sega	Europe
NHL 2K3	Xbox	April 11, 2003	Sega	Europe
NBA 2K3	Xbox	April 17, 2003	Sega	Europe
NFL 2K3	Xbox	April 17, 2003	Sega	Europe
Sega Rally Championship	Game Boy Advance	May 2, 2003	Sega	Europe
The Revenge of Shinobi	Game Boy Advance	May 23, 2003	Sega	Europe
Skies of Arcadia	GameCube	May 23, 2003	Sega	Europe
Phantasy Star Online Episode I & II	Xbox	March 7, 2003	Sega	Europe
Crazy Taxi: Catch a Ride	Game Boy Advance	July 25, 2003	Sega	Europe
Sega Arcade Gallery	Game Boy Advance	August 1, 2003	Sega	Europe
Sega Smash Pack	Game Boy Advance	August 1, 2003	Sega	Europe

=== Bandai titles ===
Title	Platform(s)	Release date	Publisher(s)	Region
Digimon World	PlayStation	July 6, 2001	Bandai	Europe
Digimon Digital Card Battle	PlayStation	July 5, 2002	Bandai	Europe
Digimon Rumble Arena	PlayStation	July 12, 2002	Bandai	Europe
Digimon World 2003	PlayStation	November 29, 2002	Bandai	Europe
Mobile Suit Gundam: Federation vs. Zeon	PlayStation 2	November 29, 2002	Bandai	Europe
Dragon Ball Z: Budokai	PlayStation 2	November 29, 2002	Bandai	Europe
Gundam: Battle Assault 2	PlayStation	November 2002	Bandai	Europe
Akira Psycho Ball	PlayStation 2	Unknown 2003	Bandai	Europe
From TV Animation - One Piece: Grand Battle!	PlayStation	June 23, 2003	Bandai	Europe
