= Alberto José González =

Alberto Jose González
- Also known as: Joe McAlby
- Born: 29 July 1972 (age 54)
- Origin: Barcelona, Spain
- Genres: Video game music, chiptune
- Occupations: Composer, Programmer, Game designer
- Years active: 1988–present

Alberto José González Pedraza (born 29 July 1972) is a Spanish video game graphic artist, music composer, designer, producer, and co-founder of Bit Managers and Abylight, who has worked on a variety of titles, most notably games released by French video game publisher Infogrames. He has composed music for or worked on over 60 games, ranging from music composition to graphic programming, and eventually became one of the lead designers at the Spanish developer Abylight. Despite having composed dozens of full soundtracks for video games, González has never had any formal music training.

He cites Tim Follin, Ben Daglish, Chris Hülsbeck, Jonathan Dunn, and David Whittaker as his main musical influences.

== Career ==
=== Early life ===
González first began his interest in programming video games at the age of eleven, when he received his Casio PB-700, and began to write small programs and games in BASIC. His first program was a pixel graphic program.

As a teenager, González was introduced to a music software application on the ZX Spectrum titled Wham! The Music Box, which was lent to him by a friend. Despite having no formal musical training, González had a good ear for melody and began to compose video game music. His interest in programming also led him to begin programming his own sound drivers with the Z80 assembler. Through this work, González had his music featured in MSX ports of a few Spectrum titles released exclusively in the Spanish market by MCM Software, including Altered Beast, Snoopy, Power Drift and Ghostbusters 2.

González began his official career in the video game industry at the age of sixteen in 1988, as a graphic designer at the small Spanish developer New Frontier, after knocking on their office door and showing his ZX Spectrum designs. The company officials liked what they saw, and hired the young designer the very next day. González's first published game was Hostages, released in 1990, in which he did the sprites design and the soundtrack.

González would continue his work as sprite designer and musician for New Frontier's future titles with games such as North & South, which garnered great reviews. He was credited as "McAlby" during his time at New Frontier.

=== Bit Managers ===
Citing mismanagement and financial issues, the New Frontier team, including González, left and founded their own game development company Bit Managers in 1992. González composed the music for all of Bit Managers titles with the exception of two, being BANG!, released in the arcades, and Radikal Bikers, a Sony PlayStation port of the arcade game with the same name. His first soundtrack for Bit Managers was Pop Up, released on the Game Boy in 1992.

Bit Managers became a popular developer and was one of Infogrames most frequently contracted partners, developing games based on popular European franchises such as The Adventures of Tintin, Astérix, Spirou, The Smurfs, as well as games based on Disney and Warner Bros.' Looney Tunes. González left behind his post as a graphic designer after the development of Astérix on the NES and Game Boy and began to fully focus on music composition and audio driver programming during his time at the company. In total, González composed music for over 40 titles across 10 different video game platforms, including Game Boy, NES, Sega Master System, Sega Game Gear, SNES, PlayStation, Game Boy Color and Game Boy Advance.

=== Abylight ===
In 2003, González left Bit Managers to found another game development company, Abylight. Eager to expand on his experiences within the game industry, González decided to take on a producer and designer role for the company, rather than music composition. The company focuses primarily on downloadable content for mobile phones and download services such as DSiWare and the Music On series. In 2011, Abylight released AfterZoom, a DSiWare game in which the player uses the camera to zoom in on real-life objects and "discover" organisms to be explored or captured. AfterZoom won the award for Best European Educational Serious Game at the Fun & Serious Game Festival.

== Works ==
=== Erbe Software ===
- Tom & Jerry (1989) – MSX (Music)

=== MCM Software ===
- Altered Beast (1989) – MSX (Music)
- Power Drift (1989) – MSX (Music)
- Ghostbusters 2 (1989) – MSX (Music)
- Snoopy (1990) – MSX (Music)

=== New Frontier ===
Released

- Z80 Attack (1988) – ZX Spectrum (Music, Graphics)
- Hostages (1990) – ZX Spectrum, Amstrad CPC, MSX (Music, Graphics)
- Magic Johnson's Basketball (1990) – ZX Spectrum, Amstrad CPC, MSX (Music, Graphics)
- Light Corridor (1991) – ZX Spectrum, Amstrad CPC, MSX (Music)
- Mystical (1991) – ZX Spectrum, MSX (Music)
- North & South (1991) – ZX Spectrum, Amstrad CPC, MSX (Music, Graphics)

Unreleased

- Jueves 12 y Sabado 14 (1989) – ZX Spectrum (Music, Graphics)
- Star Madness (1989) – ZX Spectrum (Music)
- Vengador (1990) – ZX Spectrum (Music, Program, Graphics)
- Space Massacre (1990) – ZX Spectrum (Music, Program, Graphics)
- Laser Disc (1990) – ZX Spectrum (Music, Program, Graphics)
- Pim Pam Pum (1991) – ZX Spectrum (Music, Graphics)
- Acid Killer (1991) – ZX Spectrum (Music, Graphics)
- Sokoban Perfect (1991) – ZX Spectrum, Amstrad CPC, Commodore Amiga (Music)
- Compact Editor (1993) – ZX Spectrum (Music, Program, Graphics)

=== Bit Managers ===
Released

- Pop Up (1991) – Game Boy (Music)
- Bomb Jack (1992) – Game Boy (Music)
- Astérix (1993) – Game Boy (Music, Graphics)
- Astérix (1993) – NES (Music, Graphics)
- Metal Masters (1993) – Game Boy (Music)
- The Smurfs (1994) – NES, Game Boy, SEGA Master System, Game Gear (Music, Graphics)
- Asterix & Obelix (1994) – Game Boy, Game Boy Color (Music)
- Asterix & Obelix (1995) – SNES (Music)
- Tintin in Tibet (1995) – Game Boy, Game Gear, Game Boy Color (Music)
- Spirou (1996) – Game Boy (Music)
- Tintin: Prisoners of the Sun (1997) – Game Boy, Game Boy Color (Music)
- Hugo 2 (1997) – Game Boy (Music)
- Turok: Battle of the Bionosaurs (1997) – Game Boy (Music)
- Die Maus (1998) – Game Boy (Music)
- Sea Battle (1998) – Game Boy (Music)
- Otto's Ottifanten: Baby Bruno's Nightmare (1998) – Game Boy (Music)
- Sylvester & Tweety (1998) – Game Boy, Game Boy Color (Music)
- Turok 2: Seeds of Evil (1998) – Game Boy, Game Boy Color (Music)
- Turok: Rage Wars (1999) – Game Boy, Game Boy Color (Music)
- Ronaldo V-Football (2001) – Game Boy Color (Music)
- Radikal Bikers (2000) – PlayStation, Arcade (Audio programming)
- UEFA 2000 (2000) – Game Boy Color (Music)
- Turok 3: Shadow of Oblivion – Game Boy Color (Music)
- The Revenge of the Smurfs (2000) – Game Boy Advance (Music)
- Baby Felix Halloween (2001) – Game Boy Color (Music)
- Astérix & Obélix: Bash Them All! (2001) – Game Boy Advance (Music)
- Droopy's Tennis Open (2002) – Game Boy Advance (Music)
- Inspector Gadget Racing (2002) – Game Boy Advance (Music)
- The Morning Adventure (2003) – Game Boy Advance (Music)

Unreleased

- Spirou (1996) – Game Gear (Music)
- Radikal Bikers (2000) – Game Boy Color (Music)

=== Infogrames ===
Released

- Lucky Luke (1996) – Game Boy (Music)
- V-Rally (1998) – Game Boy (Music)
- The Smurfs' Nightmare (1998) – Game Boy, Game Boy Color, (Music)
- Bugs Bunny & Lola Bunny: Operation Carrot Patch (1998) – Game Boy (Music)
- Looney Tunes Collector: Martian Alert! (2000) – Game Boy Color (Music)
- Looney Tunes: Marvin Strikes Back! (2000) – Game Boy Color (Music)

Unreleased

- Wacky Races (1999) – Game Boy Color (Music)

=== Abylight ===
- Ferrero VS Moya Tennis (2005) – Mobile Phones
- Pau Gasol One on One (2005) – Mobile Phones
- Sudokumania (2005) – Mobile Phones
- Nani Roma 4x4 Raid (2006) – Mobile Phones
- Alonso Racing 2006 (2006) – Mobile Phones
- Roland Garros (2006) – Mobile Phones
- Dakar 2007 (2007) – Mobile Phones
- Roland Garros 2007 (2007) – Mobile Phones
- Pedrosa GP 2007 (2007) – Mobile Phones
- Dakar Rally 2008 (2007) – Mobile Phones
- Elite Forces: Unit 77 (2009) – Nintendo DS
- Fish'em All! (2009) – WiiWare
- Stop Stress: A day of fury (2009) – WiiWare
- Tourist Lover (2010) – iOS
- Music On: Electronic Keyboard (2010) – DSiWare
- Music On: Acoustic Guitar (2010) – DSiWare
- Music On: Retro Keyboard (2010) – DSiWare
- Music On: Electric Guitar (2010) – DSiWare
- Cosmo Fighters (2010) – DSiWare
- Music On: Drums (2010) – DSiWare
- AfterZoom (2011) – DSiWare
- Cut The Rope (2013) – Nintendo 3DS (eShop)
- Carps & Dragons (2013) – Nintendo 3DS (eShop)
