= Bit Managers =

Spanish video game development company

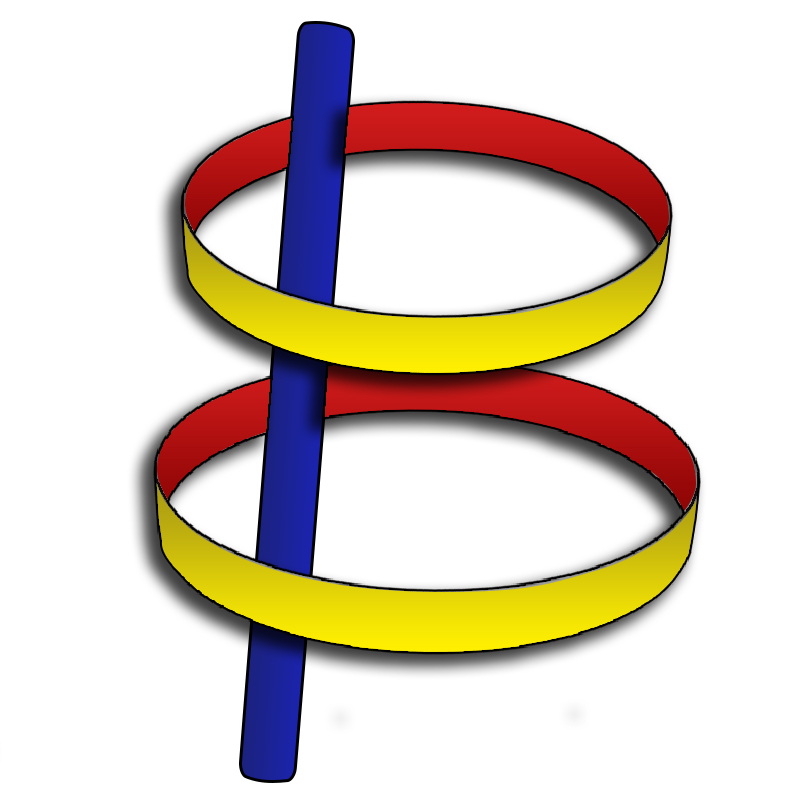
- Type: Private
- Industry: Video games
- Founded: 1988 (as "New Frontier")
- Founder: Alberto Jose González (co-founder)
- Defunct: 2005
- Fate: Bought by Virtual Toys
- Headquarters: Barcelona, Spain

Bit Managers, formerly known as New Frontier, was a video game developer based in Barcelona (Spain). It was co-founded by Alberto Jose González, who composed the music for all of its games except Bang!, a coin-operated arcade machine.

== History ==
The company was founded in 1988 as "New Frontier", initially programming games for ZX Spectrum, Amstrad CPC and MSX computer systems. The company at first met with only modest success. In 1992, the company changed its name to Bit Managers and began to make games for Nintendo consoles (especially for Game Boy). It focused on creating innovative games based on Franco-Belgian comics such as Asterix, The Smurfs or The Adventures of Tintin for a client company, Infogrames.

In 1997, Bit Managers was chosen by Acclaim Entertainment to develop some games of the Turok series for Game Boy. In 1998, the year of the launch of Game Boy Color, Bit Managers was the first third-party developer to finish two Game Boy Color titles (Turok 2 and Sylvester & Tweety).

That same year, the company was bought by a Spanish arcade video gaming company Gaelco. Bit Managers also ported the Gaelco arcade game Radikal Bikers to PlayStation shortly afterward.

In 2001, the former principals of Bit Managers re-purchased the company. Bit Managers continued its relationship with Infogrames, developing several games for Game Boy Advance.

In 2005, the Spanish video game company Virtual Toys, bought Bit Managers. That business relationship continues and Bit Managers is a subsidiary of Virtual Toys Barcelona.

== Games ==
Title	Console	Publisher	Date
The Morning Adventure	Game Boy Advance	Virtual Toys	Summer 2003
Inspector Gadget Racing	Game Boy Advance	LSP	Christmas 2002
The Revenge of the Smurfs	Game Boy Advance	Infogrames	Autumn 2002
Droopy's Tennis Open	Game Boy Advance	LSP	Summer 2002
Asterix & Obelix: Bash Them All!	Game Boy Advance	Infogrames	February 2002
Baby Felix Halloween	Game Boy Color	LSP	Christmas 2001
Tintin in Tibet	Game Boy Color	Infogrames	Spring 2001
Tintin: Prisoners of the Sun	Game Boy Color	Infogrames	Christmas 2000
Turok 3: Shadow of Oblivion	Game Boy Color	Acclaim	Summer 2000
UEFA 2000	Game Boy Color	Infogrames	Summer 2000
Radikal Bikers	PlayStation	Infogrames	Summer 2000
Ronaldo V-Football (Ronaldo V-Soccer in the USA)	Game Boy Color - B/W	Infogrames	2001, January 1, 2002 (USA)
Turok: Rage Wars	Game Boy Color	Acclaim	2000
Die-Maus	Game Boy Color	Infogrames	Autumn 1999
Asterix & Obelix	Game Boy Color	Infogrames	Summer 1999
Hugo 2½	Game Boy Color - B/W	Infogrames	Summer 1999
Turok 2: Seeds of Evil	Game Boy Color - B/W	Acclaim	Christmas 1998
Sylvester & Tweety: Breakfast on the Run (Looney Tunes: Twouble! in the USA)	Game Boy Color - B/W	Infogrames	Christmas 1998
Otto's Ottifanten: Baby Bruno's Nightmare	Game Boy	Infogrames	Autumn 1998
Sea Battle	Game Boy	Infogrames	Autumn 1998
Bang!	Coin-op	Gaelco	Spring 1998
Die-Maus	Game Boy	Infogrames	Spring 1998
Turok: Battle of the Bionosaurs	Game Boy	Acclaim	Christmas 1997
Hugo 2	Game Boy	Laguna	Christmas 1997
Tintin: Prisoners of the Sun	Game Boy	Infogrames	Spring 1997
Spirou	Game Gear	Infogrames	Unpublished (1996 copyright date)
Spirou	Game Boy	Infogrames	Christmas 1996
Tintin in Tibet	Game Gear	Infogrames	Autumn 1996
Tintin in Tibet	Game Boy	Infogrames	Summer 1996
Asterix & Obelix	Super NES	Infogrames	Christmas 1995
Asterix & Obelix	Game Boy	Infogrames	Summer 1995
The Smurfs	Master System	Infogrames	Christmas 1994
The Smurfs	Game Gear	Infogrames	Christmas 1994
The Smurfs	NES	Infogrames	Autumn 1994
The Smurfs	Game Boy	Infogrames	Summer 1994, 1998 (USA)
Metal Masters	Game Boy	Electro Brain	Christmas 1993
Asterix	NES	Infogrames	Autumn 1993
Asterix	Game Boy	Infogrames	Summer 1993
Bomb Jack	Game Boy	Infogrames	Summer 1992
Pop Up (Cool Ball in the USA)	Game Boy	Infogrames, Takara (USA)	Spring 1992, August 1994 (USA)
Mystical	Spectrum	Infogrames	Autumn 1991
The Light Corridor	Spectrum, Amstrad, MSX	Infogrames	Summer 1991
North & South	Spectrum, Amstrad, MSX	Infogrames	Christmas 1990
Hostages	Spectrum, Amstrad, MSX	Infogrames	Spring 1990
Magic Johnson Basketball	Spectrum, Amstrad, MSX	Zafiro	Spring 1990
Time Out	Spectrum, Amstrad, MSX	Zafiro	Christmas 1988

=== Bang! ===
Bang! is a wild west shoot 'em up game created for the Gaelco GG-1v machine, and released by Gaelco in 1998. It featured cartoon graphics; single-player and 2-player modes, and offered the use of a light gun and control button inputs.
