= Eternam =

1992 video game

- PC cover art
- Developer: Infogrames
- Publisher: Infogrames
- Designer: Hubert Chardot
- Platforms: MS-DOS, FM Towns
- Release: 1992 (MS-DOS); 1993 (FM Towns)
- Genre: Adventure
- Mode: Single-player

Eternam is a graphical adventure game from Infogrames, released originally in 1992 for MS-DOS. A CD-ROM version with full speech was published in 1993. The game was developed by Hubert Chardot, who is better remembered from his Lovecraft-themed games Shadow of the Comet and Prisoner of Ice. While the game is mainly a two-dimensional adventure game, it contains a three-dimensional subgame, which pays homage to Drakkhen, a roleplaying game from Infogrames. This game was re-released digitally on GOG.com in mid 2019.

== Plot ==
The plot of Eternam combines futuristic elements with historical settings. The player assumes the role of officer Don Jonz in Orion United Forces, who is starting a vacation in the planet Eternam. The planet is described as a galactic amusement centre, where different islands represent different periods of Earth's history.

After arriving on the planet and changing into a costume of barbarian warrior, Don Jonz learns that his archenemy Mikhail Nuke has taken over Eternam. The player must then make their way through the five islands of Eternam to Nuke's lair. The only help is planet's one remaining technician, Tracy, who has digitized herself into Eternam's network.

The game contains references to various historical eras, such as Ancient Egypt and the French Revolution. The locations are often absurd and contain anachronisms – for instance, statues of a medieval castle are addicted to television.

The story of this game is mainly based on the movie Westworld, its sequel Futureworld, and the short-lived television series, Beyond Westworld. In these movies Delos, the owner of an amusement park, offers vacation for rich people in areas which represent different time periods such as West World (the American Old West), Medieval World (medieval Europe), Roman World (pre-Christian Rome) and Futureworld; and in these amusement parks the attendants are androids and they are almost indistinguishable from human beings.

== Gameplay ==
The overworld of Eternam is represented as a three-dimensional subgame, which resembles a first-person shooter. The islands Eternam are filled with flying reptiles, which attack the player. The player can defend themselves by shooting the reptiles, by pressing the space bar. The 3D engine was developed by Frederic Raynal, who is better known for his work on the Alone in the Dark and Little Big Adventure series.

Within towns and buildings, the game changes into a two-dimensional adventure game. The game is hampered by the fact that while it is structured as a point-and-click adventure, it lacks mouse support, requiring icons describing possible actions to be activated by keyboard commands. All interesting items in a room are automatically revealed by a vector line combining the player character with the item in question, allowing them to be selected. Later the same engine was used in Shadow of the Comet, and in the CD version mouse support was added, to remove this limitation.

== Reception ==
In comparison with other adventure games and action adventures of Infogrames, Eternam has remained in obscurity. German magazine Power Play SH in 1992 gave the game a score of 76%. The reviewer noted that the variety of locations compensated for the technical deficiencies, although the game was not up to the standards of Lucasfilm adventure games. Computer Gaming World in 1993 called Eternam "a first-rate adventure", with "hefty doses of humor" in a "remarkably compelling story".
