= Asterix (1993 video game) =

- Cover arts of NES version (above) and Super NES version (below)
- Developers: Bit Managers (NES, GB); Infogrames (SNES)
- Publisher: Infogrames
- Composers: Alberto González(NES, GB); Frederic Mentzen(SNES)
- Platforms: Nintendo Entertainment System, Super Nintendo Entertainment System, Game Boy
- Release: EU: 1993; NA: Cancelled
- Genre: 2D action platformer
- Mode: Single-player

Astérix is the name of three 1993 platform games for the Nintendo Entertainment System, Super NES and Game Boy. The games are based on the comic book series Asterix, and are part of a series of games based on this license. These games were only made available in PAL format due to their exclusive European release.

== Gameplay ==
Asterix preparing to face a Roman soldier in the SNES version

The player controls the short and mustached Gaul who has to progress through levels located all across Europe, fighting Romans and various aggressive animals along the way, to rescue his friend Obelix before Caesar throws him to the lions. The gameplay takes place in 50 BC. Gaul is entirely occupied by the Romans. One small Gaulish village continues to defy the occupying forces, thanks to a magic potion which makes them invincible. Obelix however has vanished as the Romans captured him and took him to an unknown destination.

== Reception ==
Reception

Review scores
Publication	Score		
Publication	Game Boy	NES	SNES
Aktueller Software Markt	11/12	N/A	10/12
Computer and Video Games	N/A	N/A	83/100
GameFan	N/A	N/A	264/400
GamesMaster	N/A	N/A	79%
GameZone	N/A	N/A	78/100
Joypad	91%	N/A	N/A
M! Games	N/A	N/A	60%
Mega Fun	73/100	75%	71/100
Nintendo Power	11.5/20	11.7/20	13/20
Total!	74%	N/A	77%
Video Games (DE)	67%	70%	70%

Both Asterix and The Smurfs were much more popular in Europe, and most of the games in their respective series never made it over into the North American market.

Asterx sold over 700,000 copies.

== See also ==
- List of Asterix games
