= Turok: Battle of the Bionosaurs =

1997 video game

- European box art
- Developer(s): Bit Managers
- Publisher(s): NA/EU: Acclaim Entertainment; JP: Starfish Inc.
- Designer(s): Rubén Angel Gómez
- Programmer(s): Isidro Gilabert
- Composer(s): Alberto Jose González
- Series: Turok
- Platform(s): Game Boy
- Release: NA: December 18, 1997; EU: 1998; JP: August 7, 1998
- Genre(s): Platform
- Mode(s): Single-player

Turok: Battle of the Bionosaurs is a 1997 platform game developed by Bit Managers and published by Acclaim Entertainment for the Game Boy. An entry in the Turok series of games, it was intended to be a companion to the Nintendo 64 game Turok: Dinosaur Hunter. The game includes eight stages, has a password system, and can be played in four different languages (English, French, Spanish, and German).

== Gameplay ==
The gameplay is split into levels, each of which is in a different perspective. Level 1 is mostly side-scrolling while level 2 has a half bird's eye and half side-scrolling view. The third level is completely side-scrolling while other levels continue using this pattern. To combat enemies, players are equipped throughout the game with many types of weapons, including knives, bows, and various guns. The game also retains the emphasis of exploration found in Turok: Dinosaur Hunter by giving the player many collectible items hidden throughout each level, as well as encouraging the revisiting of certain levels with new abilities in order to obtain things they couldn't obtain earlier.

== Plot ==
The plot remains the same as Turok: Dinosaur Hunter.

The player assumes control of Tal'Set (Turok), a Native American time-traveling warrior. The mantle of Turok is passed down every generation to the eldest male. Each Turok is charged with protecting the barrier between Earth and the Lost Land, a primitive world where time has no meaning. The Lost Land is inhabited by a variety of creatures, from dinosaurs to aliens. An evil overlord known as the Campaigner seeks an ancient artifact known as the Chronoscepter, a weapon so powerful that it was broken into pieces to prevent it from falling into the wrong hands. The Campaigner plans on using a focusing array to magnify the Chronoscepter's power, destroying the barriers that separate the ages of time and rule the universe. Turok vows to find the Chronoscepter's eight pieces and prevent the Campaigner's schemes.

== Development ==
The game was developed as a companion piece to the Nintendo 64 game Turok: Dinosaur Hunter.
