= Real Pool 2 =

2002 video game

- Developer(s): Groove Alliance
- Publisher(s): Infogrames
- Platform(s): Microsoft Windows
- Release: NA: February 24, 2002
- Genre(s): Sports video game
- Mode(s): Single player, multiplayer

Real Pool 2 is a video game developed by Groove Alliance and published by Infogrames for Windows in 2002. It is the sequel to the 1998 video game Real Pool.

== Reception ==
Reception

Aggregate score
| Aggregator | Score |
|---|---|
| Metacritic | 44/100 |

Review scores
| Publication | Score |
|---|---|
| GameSpot | 5.5/10 |
| GameZone | 7/10 |
| IGN | 3/10 |

The game received "unfavorable" reviews according to the review aggregation website Metacritic.
