= Metal Masters =

1991 video game

- Game Boy cover art
- Developers: Bit Managers (Game Boy); Incal (Amiga)
- Publishers: Electro Brain (Game Boy); Infogrames (Amiga)
- Composers: Charles Callet (PC); Alberto José González (Game Boy)
- Platforms: Game Boy; Amiga; Atari ST; MS-DOS
- Release: Amiga: EU: February 1991; Atari ST: EU: February 1991; MS-DOS: EU: February 1991; Game Boy: NA: December 1993
- Genre: Fighting
- Mode: Single-player

Metal Masters is a 2D fighting video game first released in 1991 for the Atari ST, IBM PC, and Amiga. It was ported to the Nintendo Game Boy in 1993.

== Plot ==
The story starts with a villain called the Baron, the Baron is looking for the parts needed to construct the ultimate robot. The player's job is to destroy the robots, thus ruining the parts needed by the Baron.

== Gameplay ==
The player starts out controlling a robot that is a very basic model. The player can add "improvements" to this robot with credits earned during gameplay. There are four areas that each robot is graded on, body, left arm, right arm, and legs. There are several different combinations of parts that can be added to the player's robot for optimum fighting status. During a fight, each area mentioned above is represented by its own health meter. The objective of the player is to deplete the health meters of each area.

== Reception ==
The One reviewed the home computer versions of Metal Masters in 1991, praising the graphics as "impressively animated and colourful", and expressing Metal Masters is an "unusual" beat 'em up in that it's more enjoyable in two-player mode, furthermore calling it a game "for which a good deal of practice pays off." The One however, criticised the 'clanking' sound effects of robots walking as 'grating' and expressed that the game feels too slow. They concluded by stating that "Ultimately however, the slight slowness of robot maneuverability make what could have been a great battle merely a decent one."
