= Prisoners of the Sun (video game) =

1997 video game

- CD box art
- Developers: Infogrames Multimedia (SNES); Bit Managers (Game Boy, GBC); East Point Software (PC)
- Publisher: Infogrames Multimedia
- Designer: Vannara Ty
- Composers: Fabrice Bouillon-LaForest; Emmanuel Régis (SNES); Alberto Jose González (Game Boy, GBC)
- Platforms: Windows, MS-DOS, SNES, Game Boy, Game Boy Color
- Release: SNES: EU: February 9, 1997; Game Boy Color: EU: September 8, 2000
- Genre: Third-person adventure
- Mode: Single-player

Prisoners of the Sun (French: Tintin: Le Temple du Soleil, Spanish: Tintin: El Templo del Sol) is a video game based on The Seven Crystal Balls and Prisoners of the Sun from the series The Adventures of Tintin, the comics series by Belgian cartoonist Hergé. It was released for the SNES, Windows, Game Boy by 1997 and for the Game Boy Color in 2000.

== Gameplay ==
The beginning of the first level

Prisoners of the Sun is a Platform game. The player controls the character Tintin around obstacles and through challenges to complete the various levels of the game. The gameplay and animation of this game is similar to Infogrames' previous release, Tintin in Tibet, which was released in 1995.

== Release ==
It was released in 1997 for PC, SNES and Game Boy and later re-released in 2000 for Game Boy Color.
