= Looney Tunes Collector: Martian Alert! =

2000 video game

- Developer: Infogrames Lyon House
- Publisher: Infogrames
- Composer: Alberto José González
- Platform: Game Boy Color
- Release: NA: June 26, 2000
- Genre: Action
- Modes: Single-player, multiplayer

Looney Tunes Collector: Martian Alert! (Known as simply Looney Tunes Collector: Alert! in North America) is a Looney Tunes game developed and published by Infogrames for the Game Boy Color in 2000.

A sequel: Looney Tunes Collector: Martian Revenge!, was released a few months later, and shares near-identical gameplay, except it is played from Marvin the Martian's perspective.

== Gameplay ==
Players control Bugs (as well as other characters) in an attempt to prevent Marvin from destroying the Earth. This game, like many created during the Pokémon craze, attempts to recreate the "capture and collect" aspect of the Pokémon games; thus, Bugs can at any time call any Looney Tunes character that he has obtained into battle, or put them to a separate use, such as Daffy Duck's swimming or Witch Hazel's broomstick flying.

== Plot ==
Marvin the Martian is at it again, desperately trying to destroy Earth. His faithful companion, K-9, is in deep trouble though. He cleaned the flying saucer to help his master and in doing so, accidentally threw out all of the instant Martians.

Bugs Bunny, while on his way to a vacation spot in Pismo Beach, overhears Marvin yelling at K-9 about the plot. Bugs' vacation plans will have to be put on hold, as he must first save the world.

== Reception ==
Reception

Aggregate score
Aggregator	Score
GameRankings	73.71%

Review scores
Publication	Score
AllGame	4/5
GameSpot	6.5/10
IGN	9/10
Nintendo Power	7.8/10

The game was met with average reception upon release, as GameRankings gave it a score of 73.71%. The game was a runner-up for the "Adventure Game of 2000" award in Editors' Choice at IGN's Best of 2000 Awards for Game Boy Color.
