= Alcatraz (video game) =

1992 video game

- Cover art
- Developer: 221B Software Productions
- Publisher: Infogrames
- Platforms: Amiga, MS-DOS, Atari ST
- Release: 1992
- Genres: Shooter, stealth
- Mode: Single-player

Alcatraz is a shooter game created by 221B Software Developments and published by Infogrames. It was released for MS-DOS, Atari ST and Amiga in 1992, as a spiritual sequel to Infogrames' 1988 game Hostages.

== Plot ==
Alcatraz Island, once home to America's most undesirable criminals, lies empty and abandoned. Since its closure, it was used as a tourist destination. Now, it is used by the notorious criminal Miguel Tardiez to use as the centre of his distribution network for his drug and gun running and money laundering operations.

Learning that Tardiez is on American soil, the US Navy SEALs dispatch their best operatives: Bird and Fist. Their mission: to covertly breach the disused prison, destroy the drug and weapons caches and apprehend Tardiez.

Landing on the beach, they fight their way through Tardiez's highly trained henchmen, using the shadows and hiding behind walls until they can silently breach the various buildings of the prison to look for the various caches, which they burn or blow up with C4 explosive or just by shooting them. Eventually, they reach Tardiez's office as he is just making his escape by helicopter and manage to kill Tardiez before he can evade capture.

== Gameplay ==
The game takes place over 6 levels, which changes its perspective to adjust to the corresponding mission. Side-scrolling perspective is available in the outdoor levels were the player has to reach the inside of the building. Controlled commando soldier may hide in shadows from the enemies, change his weapons which were picked up from the enemies that were dispatched. Inside buildings the perspective changes to first person mode. The player has to explore a one floor area in order to find rooms that contain drugs, money, documents and weapon caches. Some of them has to be collected and some of them has to be destroyed using equipped time bombs. There are enemy soldiers on the corridors as well as in the rooms. In each level the screen is always split in half (horizontally or vertically) so action can be seen independently by any of the player that takes part in the game.

After level 5 the player can proceed directly to the extraction point to end the game or visit the cell house. In order to do so, the player has to climb up the building avoiding the search lights. After exploring the cell house, the player has to slide down the rope of the building and continue to the extraction point.

== Reception ==
According to a review in Amiga Action, "many people will find the gameplay outdated and will soon become bored with it", whereas Amiga Computing was more positive, commenting: "As a whole, Alcatraz is an improvement on Hostages" and adding that "the scrolly shooty bits are absolutely brilliant" and the game's 3D sections "are not as good, but still fun".

== Legacy ==
An unofficial remake of the game was published by City Interactive in 2010.
