= Asterix & Obelix (video game) =

1995 video game

- Developers: Infogrames; Bit Managers; East Point Software (MS-DOS)
- Publisher: Infogrames
- Composers: Alberto José González; Allister Brimble (GBA)
- Series: Asterix & Obelix
- Platforms: MS-DOS, Windows, Super NES, Game Boy, Game Boy Color, Game Boy Advance (remake)
- Release: EU: 1995
- Genre: Platform
- Modes: Single-player, multiplayer

Asterix & Obelix is a platform game released by Infogrames in 1995 for MS-DOS, Windows, Super NES, Game Boy, and Game Boy Color. The player can play as either Asterix or Obelix. The game also supports multiplayer through two players using the same keyboard.

== Gameplay ==
The game begins with Obelix (or Asterix) in the village.

Asterix and Obelix is a side-scrolling action game. The game starts with Asterix or Obelix exploring a village, a forest, and then crossing the sea to reach Britain. The game takes place in different countries, including Britania, Helvetia, Grecia, Egyptia and Hispania. Asterix and Obelix can jump, run and attack enemies, which are mostly Romans.

== Development ==
The game's levels are based on the books Asterix in Britain, Asterix in Switzerland, Asterix at the Olympic Games, Asterix and Cleopatra and Asterix in Spain. The fourth mission on the Game Boy Advance version is based on Asterix and the Black Gold instead of Asterix and Cleopatra.
