= NASCAR Heat 2002 =

2001 video game

- PS2 cover art featuring the cars of Ricky Rudd, Dale Jarrett, Jeff Burton, Rusty Wallace, and Ward Burton
- Developers: Monster Games; Crawfish Interactive (GBA)
- Publisher: Infogrames
- Platforms: Game Boy Advance, PlayStation 2, Xbox
- Release: PlayStation 2: NA: June 22, 2001; Xbox: NA: November 15, 2001; Game Boy Advance: NA: May 7, 2002
- Genre: Racing
- Modes: Single-player, multiplayer

NASCAR Heat 2002, sometimes mislabeled as NASCAR Heat, is a NASCAR video game published Infogrames for the Xbox, PlayStation 2, and Game Boy Advance consoles. It is the successor to the 2000 game NASCAR Heat, and the predecessor to NASCAR: Dirt to Daytona. NASCAR Heat 2002 can have up to 24 (PS2) or 43 (Xbox, including fictional cars) racers on one of 19 official NASCAR tracks, and the game was released in June 2001 for PlayStation 2. A port for the Xbox was released in November 2001. Developed by Crawfish Interactive, a distinct version for Game Boy Advance was released in May 2002.

== Development ==
The game was supported by GameSpy Arcade for online multiplayer.

== Reception ==
Reception

Aggregate score
Aggregator	Score		
Aggregator	GBA	PS2	Xbox
Metacritic	52/100	81/100	78/100

Review scores
Publication	Score		
Publication	GBA	PS2	Xbox
Electronic Gaming Monthly	N/A	7.5/10	6.67/10 (Note: Two critics of Electronic Gaming Monthly gave the Xbox version each a score of 6.5/10, and the other gave it 7/10.)
EP Daily	N/A	8.5/10	N/A
Game Informer	7.5/10	8.5/10	8.25/10
GameRevolution	N/A	B−	N/A
GameSpot	4/10	7.8/10	7.6/10
GameZone	5.5/10	N/A	8.5/10
IGN	5/10	8.1/10	7.8/10
Next Generation	N/A	3/5	4/5
Nintendo Power	1.5/5	N/A	N/A
Official U.S. PlayStation Magazine	N/A	4/5	N/A
Official Xbox Magazine (US)	N/A	N/A	8.2/10
Maxim	N/A	4/5	N/A

The PlayStation 2 and Xbox versions received "favorable" reviews, while the Game Boy Advance version received "mixed" reviews, according to the review aggregation website Metacritic. Jim Preston of NextGen's September 2001 issue said that the PS2 version "lacks the complete details to be the best, but it's still an accurate and fun way to drive fast and to the left." Three issues later, however, he said that the Xbox version "won't convert non-NASCAR nuts, but casual and hardcore stock fans would be wise to pick it up."

Jake The Snake of GamePro's September 2001 issue called the PlayStation 2 version "the stock-car game to beat." (Note: GamePro gave the PlayStation 2 version three 4.5/5 scores for graphics, control, and fun factor, and 3.5/5 for sound.) Four issues later, Four-Eyed Dragon said of the Xbox version, "If you want a worthy adversary to EA's NASCAR series, Heat is it." (Note: GamePro gave the Xbox version three 4.5/5 scores for graphics, control, and fun factor, and 3.5/5 for sound.)
