= Hero X =

2002 video game

- Developer: Amazing Games
- Publisher: Infogrames
- Platform: Microsoft Windows
- Release: 29 June 2002
- Genre: Action role-playing game
- Mode: Single player

Hero X is a 2002 action role-playing game developed by Amazing Games and published by Infogrames. The game was announced in March 2002 and released in June 2002.

== Plot ==
Hero X is played from the perspective of a sidekick chosen by the American Super Heroes Association to become a superhero and protect the citizens of Smalltown. The player completes a series of missions against various enemies in the town, from biker gangs and bank robbers to swamp creatures and supervillains.

== Gameplay ==
In-game screenshot of the isometric gameplay in Hero X.

Hero X is an isometric third-person game strongly influenced by the aesthetics and theme of comic books. The objectives of the game are to complete missions in the open free-roaming area around Smalltown. The game's action involves direct combat and the use of 50 superpowers selected by the player, including force fields, freeze rays, mind control and super strength. Players select the appearance of their chosen hero and an initial three powers, with further powers unlocked by completing missions throughout the game.

== Reception ==
Reception

Review scores
Publication	Score
GameSpot	3.9
PC Gamer (US)	33%
PC PowerPlay	68%

Reception of Hero X was negative, with many criticisms directed at the gameplay. Ron Dulin of GameSpot derided the game as a "punching simulator", stating the "missions are repetitive to a fault" and are "so bland (as) there is no variety", citing the lack of differentiation in super powers and limited approaches to combat. Taylor Bell of Something Awful criticised the "false advertising" of superpowers, and that enemies who are knocked out are invulnerable to attacks, requiring the player to wait. Chuck Osborn of PC Gamer noted the game contained "barely five hours of gameplay" and "non-existent AI".

Criticism of Hero X was also levelled at the presentation of the game. Derek Lee of PC Powerplay noted that "graphics are pretty much standard 2D fare with not much on offer...the streets of Smalltown seem deserted." Ron Dulin of GameSpot found the isometric presentation dated and "looks a few years old", also singling out the "MIDI rock music" and lack of sound effects. Critics also made unfavourable comparisons to Freedom Force, another comic book-inspired action game released the same year.
