= Tintin in Tibet (video game) =

1995 video game

- Windows cover art
- Developers: Infogrames Multimedia (SNES, GEN); Bit Managers (Game Boy, Game Gear, GBC); East Point Software (PC)
- Publisher: Infogrames Multimedia
- Designer: Xavier Schon
- Composers: Fabrice Bouillon-LaForest; Emmanuel Régis (SNES, GEN); Alberto Jose González (Game Boy, Game Gear, GBC)
- Platforms: Super NES, Mega Drive, Game Gear, Game Boy, Game Boy Color, Windows, MS-DOS
- Release: 1995, 1996
- Genre: Action
- Mode: Single-player

Tintin in Tibet (French: Tintin au Tibet, Spanish: Tintin en el Tibet) is a video game based on the storyline of the same title from the series The Adventures of Tintin, the comics series by Belgian cartoonist Hergé. It was one of a series of two games released, the other being Prisoners of the Sun. It was released for the Super NES in late 1995, followed by versions for the Mega Drive, Game Boy, Game Gear, MS-DOS, and Windows 95 in 1996, and for the Game Boy Color in 2001.

== Release dates ==
- Tintin in Tibet for Super NES – December 1995
- Tintin in Tibet for Mega Drive – 1996
- Tintin in Tibet for Game Boy – 1996
- Tintin in Tibet for Game Gear – 1996
- Tintin in Tibet for Windows – 1996
- Tintin in Tibet for Game Boy Color – 2001

== Reception ==
Mean Machines Sega gave the game a 70/100, praising the games visual looks, although stating "The actual gameplay, roving the left -right level from point to point, becomes repetitive". Total! gave the game a 79 out of 100, describing the game as being difficult and having "odd gameplay flaws", although also writing that the game "manages to display most of the traits of a good, solid platformer".

Reception

Review scores
Publication	Score				
Publication	Game Boy	Game Gear	PC	Sega Genesis	SNES
Consoles +	90%	N/A	N/A	N/A	90%
HobbyConsolas	N/A	N/A	N/A	91/100	91/100
Jeuxvideo.com	N/A	N/A	14/20	14/20	14/20
Joypad	88%	87%	N/A	N/A	86%
Mean Machines Sega	N/A	N/A	N/A	70/100	N/A
Mega Fun	60%	N/A	N/A	N/A	58%
Official Nintendo Magazine	N/A	N/A	N/A	N/A	79/100
Player One	N/A	78%	N/A	92%	N/A
Super Play	N/A	N/A	N/A	N/A	25%
Total!	N/A	N/A	N/A	N/A	79/100
Video Games (DE)	N/A	N/A	N/A	62%	62%
