= Looney Tunes Collector: Martian Revenge! =

2000 video game

- European cover art
- Developer: Infogrames Lyon House
- Publisher: Infogrames
- Platform: Game Boy Color
- Release: NA: November 23, 2000; EU: November 24, 2000
- Genre: Action
- Mode: Role Playing Game

Looney Tunes Collector: Martian Revenge! (Known as simply Looney Tunes: Marvin Strikes Back! in North America) is a Looney Tunes game developed and published by Infogrames for the Game Boy Color in 2000. It is a sequel to Looney Tunes Collector: Martian Alert!, as both share near-identical gameplay.

== Story ==
The game takes place after the events of Looney Tunes Collector: Martian Alert!. Marvin the Martian sees a video of himself played by Porky Pig and Daffy Duck beating him in a humiliating way. Marvin is infuriated with this and together with his dog K-9 set off to get revenge on the Earth.

== Gameplay ==
The gameplay is very similar to that of the predecessor. This time, however, the story is from Marvin's perspective. Marvin's basic controls are walking and shooting. Due to this, he needs to mainly rely on other characters such as Speedy Gonzales. There are a total of 45 characters to find in this game. These can be traded and won in multiplayer mode. It is compatible with its predecessor, giving the player a chance to connect the two games together and transfer characters collected in that game to the latter game.

== Reception ==
IGN gave it a score of 8 out of 10 and stated, "If you're looking for something completely new, this isn't going to ease your fix -- but there's a lot to like here, even if you've seen, heard, and played it before."
