= Real Pool =

2000 video game

- Developer: Astroll
- Publishers: JP: Takara; NA: Infogrames; EU: Midas Interactive Entertainment
- Platform: PlayStation 2
- Release: JP: September 7, 2000; NA: November 9, 2000; EU: March 1, 2003
- Genre: Sports video game
- Modes: Single player, multiplayer

Real Pool, known in Japan as EX Billiards (EXビリヤード, Ekkusu Biriyādo), and in Europe as International Cue Club, is a video game developed by Astroll for the PlayStation 2. This is a retooling of a Microsoft Windows and Mac OS game, also called Real Pool, which was published by WizardWorks in August 1998.

A sequel to the game, called Real Pool 2, was released for Windows in 2002.

== Reception ==
Reception

Aggregate score
Aggregator	Score
Metacritic	54/100

Review scores
Publication	Score
AllGame	2/5
Electronic Gaming Monthly	8/10
EP Daily	7/10
Famitsu	26/40
Game Informer	5.25/10
GameSpot	5.4/10
GameZone	8.6/10
IGN	4.5/10
Next Generation	2/5
Official U.S. PlayStation Magazine	3.5/5
PC Accelerator	(PC) 4/10

The game received "mixed" reviews according to the review aggregation website Metacritic. Mike Wolf of NextGen said of the game, "The uninspired play control and average game modes make this one pool game to avoid." In Japan, Famitsu gave it a score of 26 out of 40. GamePro said earlier that the PC version "offers games of 8-Ball, 9-Ball, Straight Pool, Rotation, Carom Billiards, and Bumper Pool, and at first glance, it looks hot. Too bad it feels about three years out of date." (Note: GamePro gave the PC version 3.5/5 for graphics, 3/5 for sound, and two 2.5/5 scores for control and fun factor.)

The game sold 200,000 units in the UK in 2005.
