= Rescue: The Embassy Mission =

1988 video game

Rescue: The Embassy Mission/Hostages/Hostage: Rescue Mission/Operation Jupiter
- European MS-DOS cover art
- Developer: Infogrames
- Publishers: Infogrames; Superior Software
- Designer: Philippe Agripnidis
- Composer: Alberto Jose González
- Platforms: Acorn Electron, Archimedes, Amiga, Apple IIGS, Amstrad CPC, Atari ST, Commodore 64, MS-DOS, MSX, NES, ZX Spectrum
- Release: FRA: 1988; UK: 1989; USA: 1989
- Genre: Tactical shooter
- Mode: Single-player

Rescue: The Embassy Mission (NES version), released on PC as Hostages (Note: Released as Hostage: Rescue Mission in the United States and Operation Jupiter in France.) is a 1988 tactical shooter video game developed and published by Infogrames for the Acorn Electron, Archimedes, Atari ST, Amiga, Apple IIGS, Amstrad CPC, BBC Micro, Commodore 64, MS-DOS, MSX, Nintendo Entertainment System, and ZX Spectrum. The game depicts a terrorist attack and hostage crisis at an embassy in Paris, with the player controlling a six-man [counterterrorist team as they are deployed to defeat the terrorists and free their hostages.

An indirect sequel, Alcatraz, was released for the Amiga, Atari ST, and MS-DOS in 1992.

== Gameplay ==
Rescue: The Embassy Mission is split into two or three (depending on platform) distinct sections with different gameplay styles.

In the first section, the player controls snipers Delta, Echo, and Mike (names vary between platforms, such as "Mike", "Steve", and "Jumbo"; or "Ron", "Dick", and "Kemco" in some NES versions) as they attempt to reach designated vantage points in buildings across the street from the embassy to cover the main assault; however, the terrorists have set up searchlights and are scanning the street for movement. The player controls one operative at a time in a side-scroller segment where they must reach one of the vantage points while avoiding the searchlights. To do so, the player must time their movements, take cover behind fences or in buildings, or roll, crawl, and dive to avoid the searchlights. If an operative is spotted by a searchlight, the terrorists will shoot at them; the player must roll, dive, or enter cover to avoid getting hit. Once an operative enters a building containing a vantage point, the player can take control of the next operative at the starting area. The section ends when at least one operative has reached a vantage point.

In the second section (linked to the first section in some versions), the player controls snipers from the vantage points as they besiege the embassy with their sniper rifles while the entry team assaulters deploy to the embassy's roof via helicopter and rappel down the sides to enter through the windows. Similar to a shooting gallery game, the player views the side of the embassy (which side depends on the sniper's vantage point) through a scope and must secure the operative's descent by observing the windows, and shooting terrorists whose silhouettes are visible in the windows while avoiding hitting hostages. At any point, the player can switch between snipers to view different sides of the building, or they can assume control of a rappelling assaulter as they lower themselves down the side of the embassy. The operative can choose which floor and window to enter on, and the sniper section ends when the operative enters the embassy.

In the third section, the assaulter enters the embassy by their chosen window ingress point and must search the building for hostages while defeating the terrorists. Here, gameplay is performed through a first-person perspective with occasional shifts to an over-the-shoulder third person view in certain versions of the game. The section, as well as the game itself, ends when all terrorists are defeated and all hostages are secured.

Once the game is completed, the player's speed, accuracy, hostages rescued, and operative safety are evaluated. The score screen is displayed in the format of a newspaper excerpt that details the player's actions and whether the operation was a success: if the player completed the mission perfectly without casualties, the news report will be a glowing commendation, while if the player lost several hostages and operatives, the report will be critical.

== Reception ==
Reception

Award
Publication	Award
Crash	Crash Smash

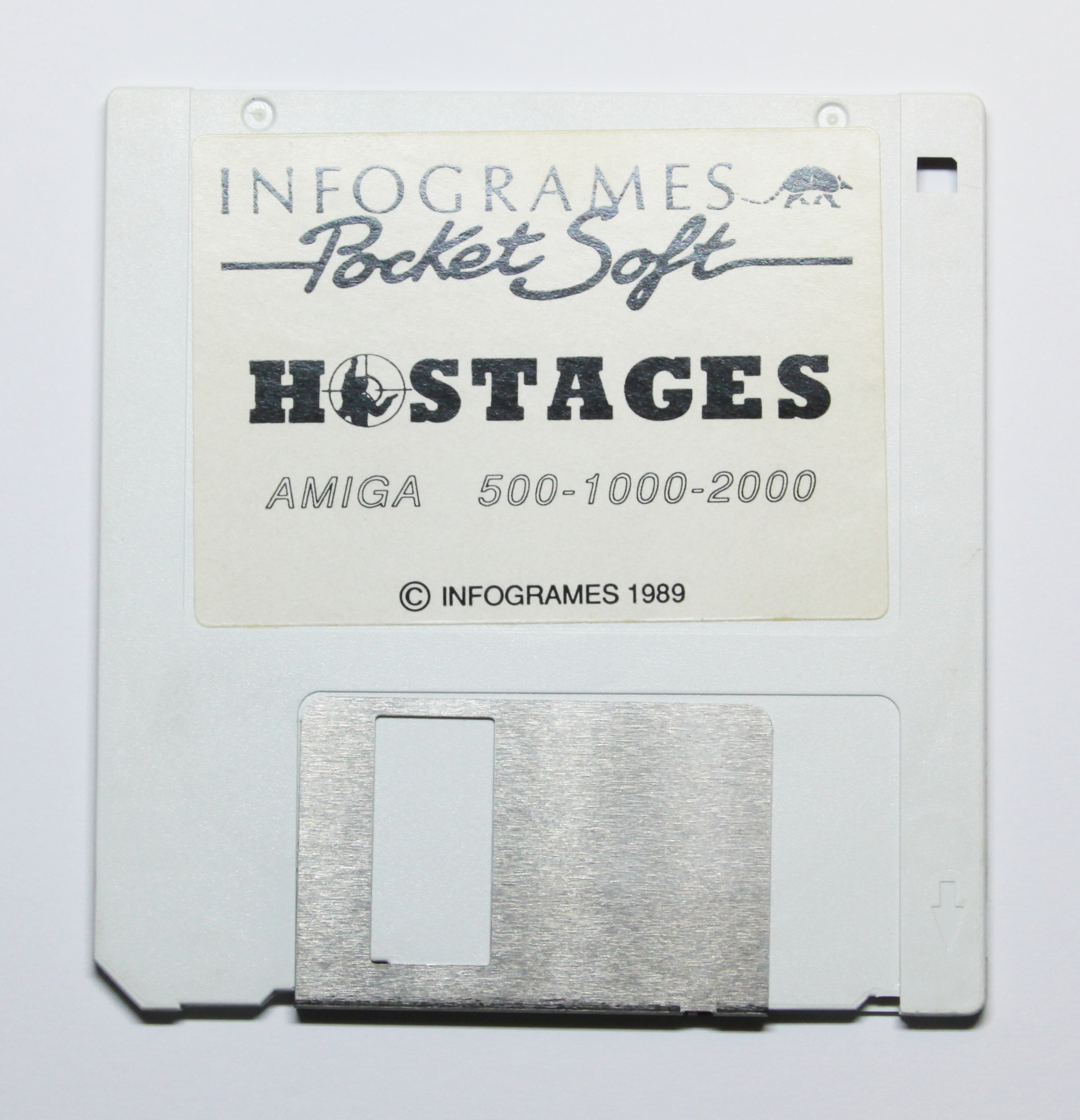
Amiga floppy disk

Hostages was well-received by critics. The game received 5 out of 5 stars in Dragon. Computer Gaming World gave the PC version a positive review, but noted poor joystick and keyboard response was a significant problem in an otherwise "great" game. Compute! called Hostages "one of the better Amiga combat games", noting that it did not involve aliens or swords.

In a 2020 retrospective, Destructoid favorably deemed it a spiritual predecessor to the Tom Clancy's Rainbow Six franchise of tactical shooters—the first installment of which was released a decade after Hostages—praising the game's "unparalleled" and "genuinely innovative" design and commending Infogrames for maintaining the game's visuals, sound design, cutscenes, and level structure across all of its ports.
