= Sega Soccer Slam =

2002 video game

- North American PS2 cover art
- Developer: Black Box Games
- Publisher: Sega
- Platforms: GameCube; Xbox; PlayStation 2 Mobile phone
- Release: GameCube: NA: March 19, 2002; PAL: October 18, 2002; Xbox: NA: August 20, 2002; PAL: October 11, 2002; PlayStation 2: NA: September 17, 2002; PAL: October 25, 2002; Mobile; July 21, 2003
- Genre: Sports
- Modes: Single-player, multiplayer

Sega Soccer Slam, also known as simply Soccer Slam, is a sports game released for GameCube, Xbox, and PlayStation 2 in 2002.

== Gameplay ==
Sega Soccer Slam is different from traditional sports games in its exaggerated interpretation of soccer. It allows characters to punch one another and eliminates several other rules, such as throw-ins, corner kicks, free kicks, and penalties. Sega Soccer Slam includes an exhibition mode, a challenge mode, a practice mode, a tourney mode, and a quest mode. It also includes two minigames: Hot Potato and Brawl.

Practice mode is a step-by-step instruction of how to play the game, teaching the player maneuvers including steals, passes, shots, dekes, volleys, as well as more complicated moves such as spotlight shot and the killer kick (an incredibly powerful shot that can be accessed when the charge bottom at the bottom of the screen reaches its maximum through doing basic moves). The practice mode is essential for both masters and newcomers to prepare for the exhibition, tourney, challenge and quest parts of the game.

The exhibition mode is similar to that of most other sport games. In it, players are allowed to choose their opponent and team as well as a stadium to play in. They can also play two mini-games with up to four players: Brawl, which is where four of the characters fight against each other, and Hot Potato, a game where passing scores points, but when the ball explodes, anyone in the blast will lose points. Tourney mode is where the player can play in a tournament that lasts for 5 days of each team playing each other at least once through the competition. Challenge mode is when the player creates a custom team and compete in a series of matches to unlock nine secret characters, but each character can only unlock two secret characters.

Other than the gameplay options said above, Sega Soccer Slam also has a quest mode. In quest mode the player chooses one of the starting six teams and then competes in a series of ten games. Through winning these games the player can accumulate money which can be used to buy character art and power-up items. The character wears each item in order to enhance his or her attributes.

== Development and release ==
Sega Soccer Slam was initially promoted as a GameCube exclusive, with the March 2002 issue of British magazine NGC describing it as part of Sega's growing support for Nintendo's console. On 21 May 2002, Sega announced that the game would also be released for the PlayStation 2 and Xbox. The additional versions featured three unlockable teams, two new minigames, an expanded arcade mode, and a challenge mode allowing players to customise their teams.

== Reception ==
Reception

Aggregate score
Aggregator	Score		
Aggregator	GameCube	PS2	Xbox
Metacritic	84/100	66/100	80/100

Review scores
Publication	Score		
Publication	GameCube	PS2	Xbox
Edge	6/10	N/A	N/A
Electronic Gaming Monthly	7.83/10 (Note: Two critics of Electronic Gaming Monthly gave the GameCube version each a score of 7.5/10, and the other gave it 8.5/10.)	N/A	N/A
EP Daily	7.5/10	N/A	N/A
Eurogamer	N/A	N/A	8/10
Famitsu	27/40	N/A	N/A
Game Informer	7.5/10	N/A	7.25/10
GameRevolution	B+	N/A	B+
GameSpot	8.6/10	8.3/10	8.8/10
GameSpy	83%	3.5/5	4.5/5
IGN	8.2/10	6/10	8.3/10
Nintendo Power	3.8/5	N/A	N/A
Nintendo World Report	9/10	N/A	N/A
Official U.S. PlayStation Magazine	N/A	2/5	N/A
Official Xbox Magazine (US)	N/A	N/A	7.9/10

The GameCube and Xbox versions received "favorable" reviews, while the PS2 version received "average" reviews, according to the review aggregation website Metacritic. AllGame gave the GameCube original three stars out of five, stating, "Outlandish costumes, ridiculous accents, and goofy expressions are wrapped around an intuitive control scheme that offers players the flexibility to perform a variety of moves, without making them complicated to perform." In Japan, where said original was ported for release on September 26, 2002, Famitsu gave it a score of 27 out of 40.

X-Play gave the GameCube original four stars out of five, calling it "the perfect choice for anyone who is looking to have a grand time alone or with friends but doesn't want to play a more serious, realistic sporting game. It's fast, fun, a little bit brutal, and easily one of the best of the latest GameCube titles." Pong Sifu of GamePro's May 2002 issue called the same console version "one of the worthiest additions to your GameCube library that you're going to find for a while." (Note: GamePro gave the GameCube version two 4/5 scores for graphics and sound, and two 4.5/5 scores for control and fun factor.) Five issues later, Michael Weigand said, "Even punters of the GameCube version will find a host of new options in this Xbox incarnation—most notably extra players and multiplayer games." (Note: GamePro gave the Xbox version two 4/5 scores for graphics and sound, and two 4.5/5 scores for control and fun factor.) Louis Bedigian of GameZone gave the same console version 7.6 out of 10, saying, "Its only real problem is the fact that it isn't a whole lot different from NHL Hitz." However, Carlos McElfish gave the PlayStation 2 version 7.2 out of 10, saying that it "suffers from a blurry visual presentation and occasional slowdown that is not present in the Xbox or GameCube version."

GameSpot put the GameCube version in third place for the Best Game of March 2002, and also named the Xbox version as the Best Xbox Game of September 2002. The game also won the award for "Best Game No One Played on GameCube" at the website's Best and Worst of 2002 Awards, and it was nominated for the "Best Alternative Sports Game on GameCube", "Best Graphics (Artistic) on Xbox", "Best Game No One Played on Xbox", and "Best Alternative Sports Game on Xbox" awards, all of which went to Tony Hawk's Pro Skater 4, Jet Set Radio Future, and Buffy the Vampire Slayer, respectively.
