= Millennium Soldier: Expendable =

1999 video game

- European PlayStation cover art
- Developer: Rage Software
- Publishers: JP: Imagineer; NA: Infogrames North America; EU: Infogrames Multimedia
- Programmers: Alan Webb; Phil Scott; Kevin Franklin
- Composer: Gordan Hall
- Platforms: Windows, Dreamcast, PlayStation, Android
- Release: May 28, 1999: Windows; JP: May 28, 1999; NA: 1999; EU: 1999 Dreamcast; JP: June 24, 1999; NA: September 9, 1999; EU: October 14, 1999 PlayStation; NA: April 25, 2000; EU: 2000 Android Expendable: Rearmed November 8, 2012
- Genre: Run and Gun
- Modes: Single-player, multiplayer

Millennium Soldier: Expendable, known in Japan as Seitai Heiki Expendable (生体兵器エクスペンダブル, Seitai Heiki Ekusupendaburu; lit. "Organism Weapon Expendable"), and in North America as just Expendable, is a run and gun video game that was released by Rage Software for Microsoft Windows in 1999. It was later ported to the Dreamcast and PlayStation consoles. A remake of the game, entitled Expendable: Rearmed, was released for Android in 2012. It is in the format of a modern arcade game. The player starts with 7 "credits" and can continue until running out of credits. A second player can join the game at any time by pressing start.

== Gameplay ==
Expendable takes place sometime in the post-apocalyptic future, where most of the galaxy was conquered by a hostile alien race. To combat the aliens, scientists had developed a "Millennium Soldier" project by cloning two super-soldiers. Like most top-down run and gun video games, Expendable has collectible upgrades and weapons, and features common aspects like bosses and levels, familiar with most games of this type.

== Development ==
Expendable supports Environment-Mapped Bump Mapping, a DirectX 6 feature first supported by the Matrox Millennium G400.

== Reception ==
Reception

Aggregate score
| Aggregator | Score | | |
| Aggregator | Dreamcast | PC | PS |
|---|---|---|---|
| GameRankings | 62% | 69% | 55% |

Review scores
| Publication | Score | | |
| Publication | Dreamcast | PC | PS |
|---|---|---|---|
| AllGame | 2.5/5 | N/A | 1.5/5 |
| CNET Gamecenter | 6/10 | N/A | 4/10 |
| Edge | N/A | 5/10 | N/A |
| Electronic Gaming Monthly | 7.5/10 | N/A | 2.83/10 (Note: In Electronic Gaming Monthly's review of the PlayStation version, one critic gave it 3.5/10, and the rest gave it each a score of 2.5/10.) |
| Famitsu | 26/40 | N/A | N/A |
| Game Informer | 4/10 | N/A | 3.5/10 |
| GameFan | 63% | N/A | N/A |
| GameSpot | 7/10 | N/A | 6.5/10 |
| GameSpy | 2/10 | N/A | N/A |
| IGN | 7.3/10 | N/A | 6/10 |
| Next Generation | 1/5 | 3/5 | N/A |
| Official U.S. PlayStation Magazine | N/A | N/A | 1.5/5 |
| PC Gamer (UK) | N/A | 60% | N/A |

The game received mixed or average reviews on all platforms according to the review aggregation website GameRankings. Edge praised the PC version's graphics, stating that "the textures are near works of art, aided by colour lighting, true shadows and ubiquitous explosions." An unnamed reviewer of Next Generation in its August 1999 issue called the same PC version "a smart little shooter, but one with limited appeal in the PC market. A forthcoming Dreamcast version may be a better fit." However, their premonition was proven wrong one month later in the magazine's September 1999 issue, when Jeff Lundrigan called the Japanese Dreamcast import "a shameful waste of technology", and warned the reader to "Stay away. Stay far, far away." In Japan, Famitsu gave the latter a little bit better score of 26 out of 40.

GamePro said of the Dreamcast version in one review, "If you are looking for all of the smoking guns fun of Contra, then Expendable will fit the bill perfectly and make your Dreamcast anything but expendable. (Note: GamePro gave the Dreamcast version two 4/5 scores for graphics and sound, 4.5/5 for control, and 3.5/5 for fun factor in one review.) In another review, the magazine said that the same console version "isn't a bad game, it just isn't a very exciting one. If mindless shooters are your bag, though, it's a great way to kill some time... and nothing more." (Note: GamePro gave the Dreamcast version 3.5/5 for graphics, and three 3/5 scores for sound, control, and fun factor.)
