= Elite Forces: Unit 77 =

2009 video game

- Developer: Abylight
- Publisher: Deep Silver
- Platforms: Nintendo DS, DSiWare
- Release: EU: March 6, 2009; NA: May 7, 2009; DSIWare; December 15, 2011
- Genre: Action
- Modes: Single-player, Multiplayer

Elite Forces: Unit 77 is an action video game developed by Spanish studio Abylight and Gammick Entertainment for the Nintendo DS and DSiWare.

== Gameplay ==
Elite Forces: Unit 77 follows a group of soldiers who are deployed to an island to rescue hostages. The player must complete missions to rescue the hostages while fighting off henchmen.

The player controls the squad of soldiers throughout the game's missions. Elite Forces: Unit 77 uses stylus controls on the bottom screen of the Nintendo DS. The player designates one player as the leader and controls other soldiers with similar touch commands. Different soldiers in the squad use different weapons and serve different functions.

The original Nintendo DS version failed to include a multiplayer version, while an updated Nintendo DSi version added it in.

== Reception ==
Reception

Aggregate score
Aggregator	Score
Metacritic	61/100

Review scores
Publication	Score
Gamekult	4/10
GamesMaster	62%
IGN	(DSi) 5.5/10; 5.2/10
Jeuxvideo.com	11/20
MeriStation	6/10
NGamer	70%
Nintendo Life	(DSi) 4/10
Nintendo World Report	5/10
Official Nintendo Magazine	79%
Pocket Gamer	3/5

The Nintendo DS version received "mixed" reviews according to the review aggregation website Metacritic. IGN's Craig Harris felt that the game had impressive visuals, but was the "perfect storm of gaming mediocrity". Pocket Gamer's Jon Jordan said that it was a "fairly competent budget DS game that's neither overly exciting nor totally embarrassing" and described it as "straight to video". Criticism was especially pointed towards the game's lack of multiplayer and unresponsive controls, but Craig Harris noted that Elite Forces: Unit 77 had impressive graphics.

The DSiWare release of Elite Forces: Unit 77 garnered similar reviews that criticized the game's control scheme, but did praise the inclusion of a multiplayer mode. Nintendo Life's Philip Reed compared the game's control scheme unfavorably to The Legend of Zelda: Phantom Hourglass and believed that the game suffered from "unintuitive and unreliable controls".
