= Beach Volleyball (video game) =

2000 video game

Power Spike Pro Beach Volleyball
- North American PlayStation version cover art featuring Gabrielle Reece
- Developers: Carapace Game Development; Spark Creative (GBC)
- Publishers: PlayStation: PAL: Infogrames/Canal+ Multimedia; NA: Infogrames; Game Boy Color; Infogrames; Windows: NA: Infogrames; EU: Mindscape
- Platforms: Game Boy Color, PlayStation, Microsoft Windows
- Release: PlayStation: EU: October 27, 2000; NA: November 21, 2000; Game Boy Color: NA: December 22, 2000; EU: May 15, 2001; PC: NA: May 9, 2001; EU: 2001
- Genre: Sports
- Modes: Single-player, multiplayer

Beach Volleyball, released as Beach 'n Ball on the Game Boy Color, and as Power Spike: Pro Beach Volleyball in North America, is a volleyball video game developed by French studio Carapace Game Development and Spark Creative SARL, and published by Infogrames for Game Boy Color, PlayStation and Microsoft Windows in 2000. The game was released as part of the publisher's "V" series in Europe.

== Development ==
The game was known as V-Beach Volleyball prior to its release in Europe.

== Reception ==
Reception

Aggregate scores
Aggregator	Score		
Aggregator	GBC	PC	PS
GameRankings	60%	57%	57%
Metacritic	N/A	60/100	48/100

Review scores
Publication	Score		
Publication	GBC	PC	PS
AllGame	N/A	2/5	N/A
CNET Gamecenter	N/A	N/A	3/10
Electronic Gaming Monthly	N/A	N/A	4.5/10
EP Daily	N/A	N/A	6.5/10
Game Informer	6.5/10	N/A	7.75/10
GameSpot	N/A	6.2/10	4.6/10
GameSpy	N/A	78%	N/A
GameZone	N/A	N/A	5.8/10
IGN	6/10	7.1/10	6.5/10
Next Generation	N/A	N/A	2/5
Nintendo Power	3/5	N/A	N/A
Official U.S. PlayStation Magazine	N/A	N/A	2.5/5
PC Gamer (US)	N/A	51%	N/A

The PC version received "mixed" reviews, while the PlayStation version received "generally unfavorable reviews", according to the review aggregation website Metacritic. Kathryn Renta of NextGen said, "There's only one volleyball game available on the PlayStation – and apparently, it's one too many. That's the sad truth about Power Spike. It could have been enjoyable, but the graphics are ugly, the music repetitive, and it's a chore to play."
