= Inspector Gadget Racing =

2003 video game

- Developer(s): Bit Managers
- Publisher(s): Light & Shadow Production
- Platform(s): Game Boy Advance
- Release: 28 February 2003
- Genre(s): Racing
- Mode(s): Single-player

Inspector Gadget Racing is a 2003 racing video game for the Game Boy Advance developed by Bit Managers and published by Light & Shadow Production. The game is a kart racing game featuring licensed characters from the Inspector Gadget franchise. Upon release, the game received mixed reviews, with reviewers praising the design and variety of the circuits, but critiquing the game's controls and handling, difficulty and lack of originality in the genre. Retrospective reception of the game was also mixed, with outlets doubting the necessity of a licensed game using Inspector Gadget characters.

== Gameplay ==
A screenshot of Inspector Gadget Racing.

The game is a kart racing game in which players compete as Inspector Gadget and other characters, including Penny and Dr. Claw, in races held across twenty circuits, with players starting with three available tracks and unlocking additional ones as they win each in order. Players can collect power-ups on courses, such as missiles or tar, to disrupt other racers. The game has multiplayer functionality using the Game Link Cable for Advance players each with a copy of the game.

== Reception ==
Reception

Review scores
Publication	Score
Joypad	5/10
G-Force	54%
N-Zone	45%
Nintendo Official Magazine	4/10
Total Advance	70%

Inspector Gadget Racing received mixed reviews upon release, with several critics comparing the game unfavorably to Mario Kart: Super Circuit as a better racing title for the Advance. Nintendo Official Magazine stated that the game's graphics were "bold and colourful", but the racing was "pedestrian" due to the "poor collision detection", remarking in later issues that the game was the worst kart racing game on the Advance, and that it was "one of the slowest racers you'll ever play" and a "black sheep of the karting family". Kendy Ty of Joypad enjoyed the game's "colourful" and cartoonish graphics, but critiqued the game's "very slow" pacing and "lack of sensation of speed", which made it have "too much inertia and makes it quite difficult to get to grips with". Karen Harris of Total Advance also praised the game's "jaunty, imaginative tracks" for their color and variety, but critiqued the game's "infuriating" difficulty and unoriginality. Oliver Lan of G-Force found the game to be "completely uninspiring", stating "the vehicles feel slow and clunky, and the races are devoid of excitement".

Retrospective reception of Inspector Gadget Racing was similarly mixed. Listing the game as one of "the most forgettable kart racers ever released", Henry Gilbert of GamesRadar+ lamented the game "barely had enough memorable characters", featured "mundane driving" and did not use its theme song. Similarly, listing it as a "racing tie-in nobody asked for", Chris Scullion of Nintendo Life stated that the show was a poorly suited license to make a racing game. Scullion critiqued the "painfully slow" pacing and car handling, but stated the game was "not actually the worst looking game" and did feature "impressive enough tracks".
