= Shadow of the Comet =

1993 video game

- Developer: Infogrames
- Publishers: EU: Infogrames; NA: I•Motion
- Director: Norbert Cellier
- Artist: Yaël Barroz
- Composer: Philippe Vachey
- Platforms: MS-DOS, PC-98, Linux
- Release: March 25, 1993
- Genre: Adventure
- Mode: Single-player

Shadow of the Comet (later repackaged as Call of Cthulhu: Shadow of the Comet) is an adventure game developed and released by Infogrames in 1993. The game is based on H. P. Lovecraft's Cthulhu Mythos and uses many elements from Lovecraft's The Dunwich Horror and The Shadow Over Innsmouth. A follow-up game, Prisoner of Ice, was released in 1995 and does not directly follow the events of this game.

Shadow of the Comet: The Official Strategy Guide (Prima Publishing, 1994; re-released by the author, 2019) was written by Steve Schwartz. In addition to a game walkthrough, all game dialog, and a disk of saved games, the book includes the Lovecraft story The Call of Cthulhu.

== Gameplay ==
The player can control the protagonist Parker via the arrow keys. When Parker comes across something he can interact with, a button press will allow the player to do so. Items that Parker can take will project a white line from Parker's eye to the item, indicating that when the player interacts with the item, it will be added to Parker's inventory. Apart from this the game plays like a standard third-person adventure game.

== Plot ==
The game takes place in 1910 and concerns the visit of a young British photographer, John Parker, to the isolated New England town of Illsmouth (an allusion to Lovecraft's Innsmouth) to witness and photograph the passage of Halley's Comet. In 1834, on the last passing, Lord Boleskine visited the town after learning that certain conditions near the town would allow astronomical objects to be seen clearer and closer than on any other spot on earth. He decided to test this theory by observing the comet from Illsmouth, but something unexpected happened and he went insane, spending the rest of his life in a lunatic asylum. Parker, learning of the 1834 incident and reading over Boleskine's papers, wishes to succeed where his predecessor failed. When he arrives, Parker stumbles upon a sinister conspiracy and must survive the three days between his arrival and the comet's passage while finding out what happened in 1834.

== Reception ==
Computer Gaming World praised Shadow of the Comet's plot, puzzles, writing, and "rather naughty, dark Gallic sense of humor" but criticized the lack of mouse support, calling object manipulation and puzzle solving without one "painful". The magazine concluded that the game "is a high quality graphic adventure that offers nothing particularly new as far as technological advances and is, in some ways, a touch old-fashioned. This may, however, not be a bad thing" given the plot's quality.

James V. Trunzo reviewed Call of Cthulhu: Shadow of the Comet in White Wolf #48 (Oct., 1994), rating it a 5 out of 5 and stated that "Shadow of the Comet captures the essence of Lovecraft's horror stories. It builds suspense and tension without resorting to gore or shock. Rich dialogue, 'real' situations and a tantalizing puzzle should keep you glued to the monitor."

Pyramid magazine reviewed Shadow of the Comet and stated that "Shadow of the Comet is a very nice computer RPG version of a typical Call of Cthulhu story."

In 2011, Adventure Gamers named Shadow of the Comet the 74th-best adventure game ever released.
