= Ronaldo V-Football =

2000 video game

- PlayStation box art
- Developer: PAM Development
- Publisher: Infogrames
- Composer: Alberto Jose González (GBC)
- Platforms: PlayStation, Game Boy Color
- Release: PlayStation: EU: 2000; Game Boy Color: NA: June 2001
- Genre: Sports (football)
- Mode: Single-player

Ronaldo V-Football, known as Ronaldo V-Soccer in the United States, is a 2000 football video game developed by PAM Development and published by Infogrames for the PlayStation and Game Boy Color. The game was endorsed by the Brazilian footballer Ronaldo, at the time one of the highest-renowned players in the world; it is the only game exclusively endorsed by him.

== Gameplay ==
There are 176 international teams (some featuring real player names, others not) are available to play in the five different game modes: Exhibition, Arcade Cup, Resistance, Tournaments and the V-Football Cup (the equivalent of the World Cup in the game). All-star teams are unlocked as a reward for winning competitions. Fifteen stadiums (some based on real locations) are available to play in, with settings for day and night as well as clear, rainy or foggy weather conditions.

Exhibition mode is a quick match option. This mode allowed up to four players to play via the PlayStation multitap. The Game Boy Color version did not support multiplayer play.

The Arcade cup is a 16-team knockout competition where the player can not lose more than three times and has to beat all 16 teams. This game mode does not feature a multiplayer option.

Endurance is a five-division challenge where players must beat eight other teams in order to climb to the next rank. Resistance mode is completed when the player reaches the highest point on the final rank.

There are several tournaments in the game, with each one taking place in a different continent. The tournaments are available in both tournament and league models.

- Continental Cup
- Supreme Cup
- Continental League
- Intercontinental League
- Custom Cup
- Custom League

The main aim of Ronaldo V-Football is to win the V-Football Cup. The V-Football Cup is set out in a similar model to the FIFA World Cup; the player has to qualify for the championship by winning a continental championship, place in the top two in their group table, and then reach the final by winning the knockout matches that follow the group stage.

== Music ==
The main theme for Ronaldo V-Football was "Samba de Janeiro" by Bellini, a dance remix of "Belo Horizonti" by The Heartists. The Game Boy Color version's soundtrack was created by Alberto Jose González.

== Development ==
Ronaldo was reported to be in talks for a video game deal with Infrogrames in 1998.

== Reception ==
Reception

Review score
Publication	Score
PlayStation Official Magazine – UK	7/10
