= Spirou (video game) =

1995 video game

- European Super Nintendo cover art
- Developers: Infogrames; Bit Managers (GB)
- Publisher: Infogrames
- Producer: Bruno Bonnell
- Designer: Rudolphe Furykiewicz
- Platforms: Mega Drive, SNES, Game Boy, Windows, MS-DOS
- Release: Mega Drive: EU: 1995; SNES, Game Boy, Windows, MS-DOS: EU: September 29, 1996
- Genre: Platform
- Mode: Single-player

Spirou is a platform game developed and published by Infogrames in 1995 for the Mega Drive and in 1996 for the Super NES, Game Boy, Microsoft Windows and MS-DOS. A Game Gear version was planned but canceled, although a fully completed prototype was leaked online.

The game is based on the Spirou et Fantasio comic book series. It follows Spirou on his adventure to rescue his kidnapped friend Count Champignac and stop his arch-enemy Cyanida from making robots rule the Earth. The game was noted for its strong graphics and for being faithful to the Spirou et Fantasio comic book series, but due to its relatively high difficulty, most reviewers recommended it only for true fans of the series.

== Gameplay ==
Spirou is a platform video game in which the titular main character can walk, run, jump, and duck. To reach certain areas, he can dive and slide along the ground for a short distance. He can also use a weapon called the Micropulser, obtained in the third level of the game. Spirou can swim in the game's underwater levels.

Spirou has a health bar that allows him to take six hits before losing a life. If the player has extra lives remaining, the level restarts upon losing a life; if there are no extra lives left, the game ends. An extra life is earned by collecting 50 Spirou hats, which are scattered throughout the eight levels. Collecting a heart refills the health bar by one point. While diving underwater, Spirou can hold his breath only for a limited time, which can be extended by collecting oxygen bottles.

A password feature allows the player to continue playing, though there is only one valid password, which always restarts the player in the middle of the game. The game offers three difficulty levels: easy, medium, and hard. It also includes a sound test feature.

== Plot ==
Spirou, a journalist, and his friend Fantasio visit New York for an international conference on scientific research. Upon their arrival, they discover that Count Champignac, their longtime friend and one of the inventors at the conference, has disappeared. It is revealed that Cyanide, a robot and one of Spirou's longtime enemies, has kidnapped the count. Using Count Champignac's inventions, Cyanide plans to make robots rule the Earth and enslave all humans. While Spirou attempts to rescue Champignac and stop Cyanide, Fantasio gathers intelligence to aid Spirou.

== Reception ==
Reception

Review scores
Publication	Score
Video Games (DE)	69%(Mega Drive)
Gamers (DE)	2+ out of 3(Mega Drive)
Super Power (FR)	86% (SNES)
Total! (DE)	3+ out of 5(SNES)
Joypad (FR)	86%(Game Boy)
Total! (DE)	2 out of 5(Game Boy)

The Mega Drive, Super Nintendo, and Game Boy versions of Spirou were reviewed in several video game magazines in France and Germany. It was generally well received, with most critics praising the graphics and fluid animations in both the console and Game Boy versions. The soundtrack and varied gameplay were also well regarded, and the controls were noted for being precise and easy to use. Critics generally considered the game faithful to the comic series. However, the difficulty level was criticized for being too high. Additionally, the inclusion of only one password to save progress led some reviewers to comment that too many levels had to be replayed to reach the point where the player had previously been. Ultimately, most reviewers recommended the game primarily for hardcore fans of the genre.^{[b]}
