= Prisoner of Ice =

1995 video game

- Developer: Infogrames Multimedia
- Publishers: MS-DOS, Windows, Mac; Infogrames Multimedia (Europe); I•Motion (North America); Saturn, PlayStation; Xing Entertainment
- Platforms: MS-DOS, Windows, Mac OS, Saturn, PlayStation
- Release: MS-DOS, Windows: NA: 1995; EU: May 24, 1995; Mac OS: NA: July 15, 1996; Saturn: JP: December 23, 1997; PlayStation: JP: December 25, 1997
- Genre: Adventure
- Mode: Single-player

Prisoner of Ice (also Call of Cthulhu: Prisoner of Ice) is an adventure game developed and released by Infogrames Multimedia for IBM PC compatibles and Macintosh in 1995 in America and Europe. It is based on H. P. Lovecraft's Cthulhu Mythos, particularly At the Mountains of Madness, and is a follow-up to Infogrames' earlier Shadow of the Comet. In 1997, the game was ported to the Sega Saturn and PlayStation exclusively in Japan.

== Plot ==
Prisoner of Ice begins during the run-up to World War II, primarily around Antarctica. The main character is a young U.S. intelligence officer, Lt. Ryan, who has been assigned to a British submarine, HMS Victoria, for a special mission. As the game begins, the submarine is fleeing the Antarctic after rescuing a Norwegian who has recently escaped from a secret German base in the Antarctic (it is later revealed that the base is built atop the Ancient Ruins mentioned in At the Mountains of Madness). Along with the Norwegian, the sub has picked up two mysterious cargo crates stolen from the Nazis.

Late in the game, in Argentina, Ryan meets John Parker, the central character from Shadow of the Comet, and reveals the links between the two games. Narackamous, the main antagonist of Shadow of the Comet, also returns.

The game has a choice of two endings, though there is little difference between them.

== Gameplay ==
The game involves solving puzzles through a point and click user interface. The player can examine any item and, depending on the item, either pick it up, use another item on it, or operate it in some way.

Some puzzles, if not completed within a short span of time (always less than a minute), will result in a game over. To ensure that the player does not get stuck by saving their game at a point from which they cannot possibly complete a puzzle in time, the game autosaves onto a separate save file at the beginning of each timed puzzle.

== Release ==
The game was released for MS-DOS compatible operating systems, Microsoft Windows, and Macintosh. It was published in the US in 1995 by I Motion and in Europe in 1995. In PAL territories it was titled Call of Cthulhu: Prisoner of Ice.

Three French-language comic books were published as tie-ins to the game: La Geôle de Pandore (Pandora's Jail), Le Glaive du Crépuscule (The Dagger in the Dusk) and La Cité des Abîmes (The City of the Depths).

In Japan, the game was released in 1997 by Xing Entertainment as Prisoner of Ice: Jashin Kourin, and ported to the Sega Saturn and PlayStation game consoles. These ports contain no enhancements from the PC versions. The English voice acting of the PC version is retained, but the text which appears when examining or picking up objects is translated to Japanese. The Saturn version is compatible with the Netlink Mouse.

In 2015, Prisoner of Ice and Shadow of the Comet were re-released as DRM-free on GOG.com for modern computers.

== Reception ==
Reception

Review scores
Publication	Score
Next Generation	3/5
Computer Game Review	85/78/80

According to the French newspaper Les Échos, Prisoner of Ice was commercially successful. Its sales surpassed 30,000 units in the United States alone during its first day of release.

A reviewer for Next Generation gave the PC version three out of five stars, praising the gripping storyline, beautiful animation, and eerie atmosphere, but criticized the "emotionless" voice acting. He concluded, "It's worth checking out for the great storyline and art, but not good for much else."

== See also ==
- Call of Cthulhu: Beyond the Mountains of Madness
