= The Light Corridor =

1990 video game

- Developer: Infogrames
- Publisher: Infogrames
- Platforms: Atari ST, Amiga, Amstrad CPC, Commodore 64, MS-DOS, MSX, ZX Spectrum
- Release: 1990
- Genre: Puzzle

The Light Corridor is a puzzle video game for the Atari ST, Amiga, Amstrad CPC, Commodore 64, MS-DOS, MSX, and ZX Spectrum. It was published in 1990 by Infogrames. The game is played from a first-person perspective.

== Plot ==
The player must capture the light rays in order to accomplish the ultimate challenge: the illumination of the stars in a newborn universe.

== Gameplay ==
The player uses a paddle to hit a metal ball down a long corridor. The player releases the ball (which is stuck to the paddle at the beginning of the game) and it will travel down the corridor until it hits a wall or similar obstacle and bounces back towards the player. At this point, the player will need to hit the ball again. If he does not, the ball will hit him and he will lose a life. The game will continue from where the player stopped, and the ball will once again be attached to the paddle.

When the ball is travelling down the corridor, the player must walk and follow it. The object of the game is to reach the end of the corridor.

Obstacles such as moving elevator-style doors make navigating the corridor difficult and success relies on the player's quick reactions and forward planning. Collectable power-ups make progress easier. The colour of the corridor changes after every four levels, and there are fifty levels in total.

The game can be played by one or two players. In two player games, the players will alternate turns.

There is a level construction kit included, so the player can create their own levels and save them for future use.

== Reception ==
Reception

Award
Publication	Award
Sinclair User	Gold

Sinclair User gave it a 93% overall score, Crash called it "simple but wildly addictive" and Your Sinclair said it was frustratingly difficult but it was worth going back for more.
