= List of The Smurfs video games =

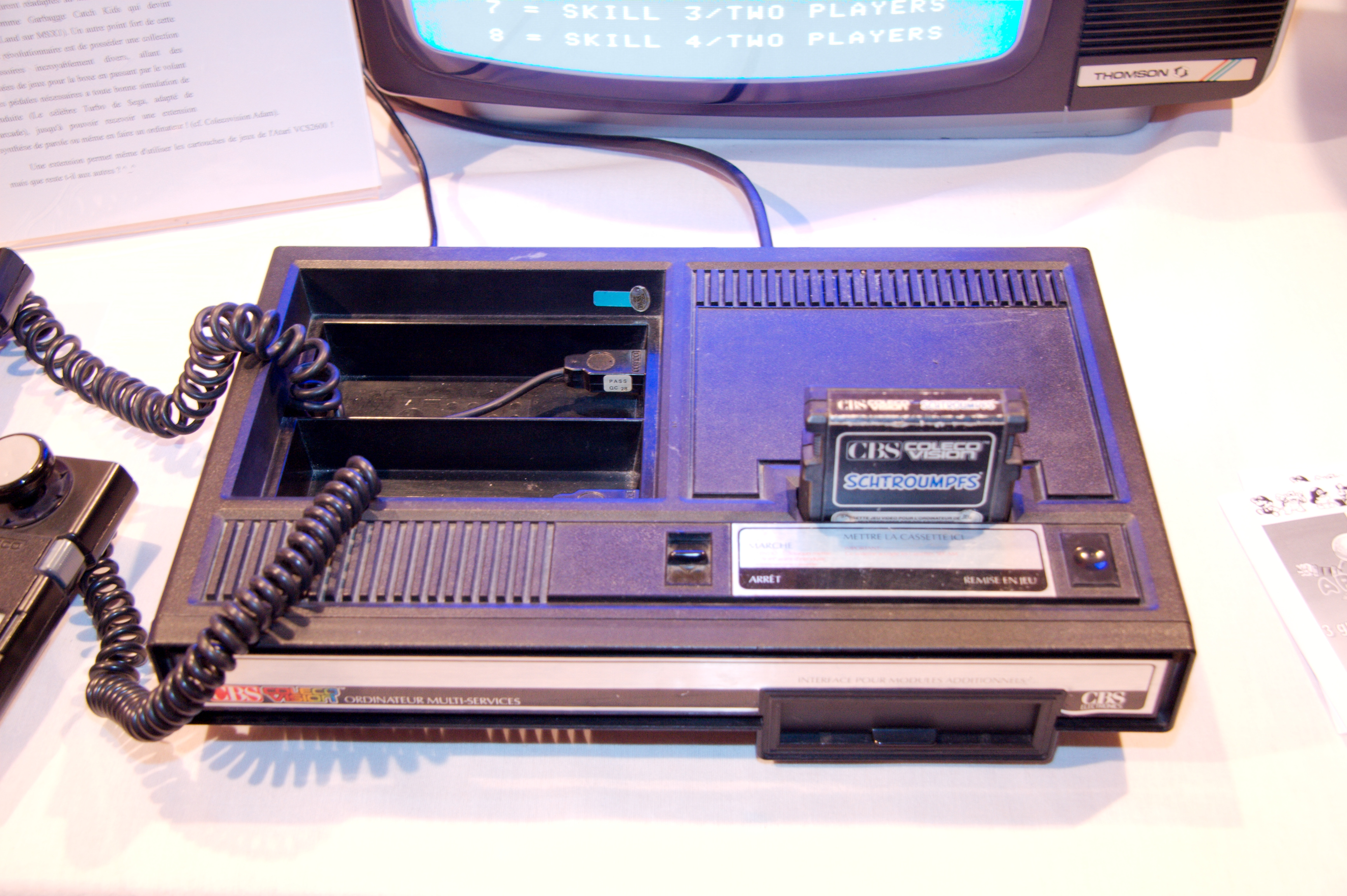
ColecoVision with The Smurfs cartridge, 2008 Festival du Jeu

This is a list of The Smurfs video games that have been published by developers such as Coleco, Infogrames, and Capcom. The Smurfs (Les Schtroumpfs) are a fictional group of small sky blue creatures who live in a village in the woods. They were designed by Belgian cartoonist Peyo in 1958 and were featured in the Belgian comics magazine Spirou. They are widely known through the 1980s Hanna-Barbera animated television series of the same name.

As a franchise, the Smurfs appeared in many video games throughout the 1980s and 1990s on many consoles. They have been released for the Nintendo Entertainment System, the Super Nintendo Entertainment System, the Game Boy line, the early Atari consoles, Coleco's ColecoVision, most of Sega's consoles, the PlayStation, the PC, iOS, Android, Nintendo DS, Wii, Nintendo Switch, and Nintendo 3DS.

== List ==
Game	Details
De Smurfen Original release date(s): EU: 1985	Release years by system: 1985—Commodore 64
De Smurfen Original release date(s): EU: 1985	Notes: Smurfen (Dutch for Smurfs) is a homebrew game
Smurf: Rescue in Gargamel's Castle Original release date(s): NA: 1982	Release years by system: 1982—Atari 2600, ColecoVision
Smurf: Rescue in Gargamel's Castle Original release date(s): NA: 1982	Notes: Smurf: Rescue in Gargamel's Castle is a video game in which the player must brave a series of obstacles to rescue Smurfette from Gargamel's castle. An Intellivision version was planned but never developed or released. Gargamel has kidnapped Smurfette. As a Smurf, the player has to walk from the Smurf village through a forest and a cave on the way to Gargamel's castle, where Smurfette awaits rescue. The player has an energy bar that slowly depletes over time. Each side-scrolling screen presents various obstacles that the player must precisely jump over (e.g. fences, stalagmites) or land upon (e.g. ledges). Failure to execute any jump results in instant death. Higher difficulty levels introduce flying hawks, flying bats and spiders that the player must also avoid.
Smurf Play and Learn Cancellation date: NA: 1983	Proposed system release: 1983—ColecoVision
Smurf Play and Learn Cancellation date: NA: 1983	Notes: Smurf Play and Learn was an edutainment game originally planned for release for the ColecoVision; it was advertised in their promotional literature, but was never worked on or released.
The Smurfs Save The Day Original release date(s): NA: 1983	Release years by system: 1983—Atari 2600
The Smurfs Save The Day Original release date(s): NA: 1983	Notes: The Smurfs Save the Day is an educational game in The Smurfs franchise designed for children. It is the third title in the Smurfs video-game series, and it was one of only two games designed for use with the KidVid "voice module" system. Released as a bundle with the KidVid system, The game came with three audio cassettes that were required for gameplay. Attached to the cartridge by cables, the three cassettes each provided music and gameplay elements without which the cartridge alone would not boot. The Smurfs Save the Day is based around the concepts of music, color, and shape. Each of the three concepts is explored individually on its own cassette. Thus, musical games can be played on the "Harmony Smurf" cassette, color games are playable on the "Greedy Smurf" cassette, and on the "Handy Smurf" cassette players are presented with games involving shape.
Tiger Smurf / Schtroumpf Large Screen 1983 – Handheld electronic game	
Smurf Paint and Play Workshop Original release date(s): NA: 1984	Release years by system: 1984—ColecoVision
Smurf Paint and Play Workshop Original release date(s): NA: 1984	Notes: Smurf Paint 'n' Play Workshop is an action game based on Smurf: Rescue in Gargamel's Castle. The game is designed for children from ages four to eight, and it lets children play, paint, and place objects on the screen. In addition, it allowed children to create plays and make animations. Various objects that players can manipulate include shapes, letters, and numbers, depending on the narrative.
The Smurfs Original release date(s): EU: 1993; NA: 1994; BRA: November 1995	Release years by system: 1993—Game Boy; 1994—NES, Super Nintendo, Game Gear; 1995—Master System, Mega Drive, Mega-CD; 1996—DOS, Windows; 2002—Game Boy Advance
The Smurfs Original release date(s): EU: 1993; NA: 1994; BRA: November 1995	Notes: The Smurfs is a platform game based on the popular eponymous series. It was originally released by Infogrames for Game Boy in Europe in 1993 and in North America in 1994, the latter of which had Super Game Boy support. It was one of the first games available in more than one language, selectable by the player; it could be played in either English, French, Spanish, German and Italian. The Game Boy, Master System and Mega Drive versions were the only ones also released outside Europe, the Game Boy one in North America in 1994 and the Master System and Mega Drive ones in Brazil in 1996. A Game Boy Advance version was released in 2002, under the title "Revenge of The Smurfs". The Game Boy, NES, Game Gear, Master System and Game Boy Advance versions were developed by Bit Managers.
The Smurfs Travel The World Original release date(s): EU: 1996	Release years by system: 1996—Mega Drive, Super Nintendo, Master System, Game Gear, Game Boy
The Smurfs Travel The World Original release date(s): EU: 1996	Notes: The Smurfs Travel the World is a platform game based on the popular eponymous series developed by Virtual Studio and released by Infogrames in 1996 for the Game Boy, Master System, Game Gear, Super Nintendo and Mega Drive. The Master System version—titled The Smurfs 2—is notable for being the last commercial release for the console in Europe and also being one of the rarest games available for the console. This game picks up right after the events of the TV series, follows Inquisitive Smurf brings Smurfette along to Papa Smurf's laboratory to see the Magic Crystal that allows them to travel to anywhere in the world, but suddenly Smurfette breaks it, and they are gone. Now they must face the challenges in all continents in order to retrieve all shards of the Crystal and return home. (In the Master System and the portable versions of this game, there is also the additional task of cleaning the various regions of the world that the two Smurfs visit of its pollution.)
Learn With The Smurfs Original release date(s): NA: 1996	Release years by system: 1996—Windows
The Smurfs Original release date(s): NA: December 14, 1999; EU: 1999	Release years by system: 1999—PlayStation
The Smurfs Original release date(s): NA: December 14, 1999; EU: 1999	Notes: The Smurfs is a 2.5D platform game for the PlayStation, developed by Heliogame Production and released by Infogrames in 1999 in Europe and North America. A Nintendo 64 version (The Smurfs 64) was scheduled for release but was ultimately cancelled.
The Smurfs' Nightmare Original release date(s): EU: 1997 (GB), 1999 (GBC); NA: February 28, 1999	Release years by system: Game Boy (Europe only) Game Boy Color
The Smurfs' Nightmare Original release date(s): EU: 1997 (GB), 1999 (GBC); NA: February 28, 1999	Notes: The Smurfs' Nightmare (also sub-titled the Smurfs 3) is a 2D platform game developed by Velez and Dubail and published by Infogrames. This time the evil Gargamel has cast a spell on all sleeping smurfs trapping them in terrible nightmares. You as Brave Smurf have to enter all the Smurfs' houses and rescue them from their nightmare.
The Adventures of The Smurfs Original release date(s): December 31, 2000	Release years by system: Game Boy Color
The Adventures of The Smurfs Original release date(s): December 31, 2000	Notes: The Adventures of The Smurfs is a top down adventure game on Game Boy Color published by Infogrames.
Smurf Racer! / 3, 2, 1, Smurf! My First Racing Game Original release date(s): NA: April 1, 2001; EU: 2000	Release years by system: 2001—PlayStation, 2000—Windows (Europe only)
Smurf Racer! / 3, 2, 1, Smurf! My First Racing Game Original release date(s): NA: April 1, 2001; EU: 2000	Notes: Smurf Racer! is a racing game released by Infogrames for the PlayStation and Windows. In Europe, it is known as 3, 2, 1, Smurf! My First Racing Game. The Official UK PlayStation Magazine gave the game a score of 1/10.
Smurfs' Village Original release date(s): NA: November 4, 2010; WW: November 11, 2010; JP: July 15, 2011	Release years by system: 2010—iOS; 2011—Android
Smurfs' Village Original release date(s): NA: November 4, 2010; WW: November 11, 2010; JP: July 15, 2011	Notes: Smurfs' Village is a social mobile game developed by Indian mobile game developer Garden City Games (formerly PopReach Games), a division of German-based Phoenix Games, for the iOS and Android platforms. This game was previously owned by Flashman Games LLC. from 2016 until 2019, and by Beeline Interactive Inc., a division of Capcom until 2016. In November 2010, it overtook Angry Birds as the top-grossing iPhone game. In September 2011, Smurfs' Village reached 15 million downloads worldwide. The game was ported to the Android platform on September 28, 2011. The game has been installed on up to 10 million Android phones between March and April 2012. As of March 2012, the game has reached 56 million downloads. Other Smurfs games that released in iOS and Android are Smurfs' Grabber and Smurf Life.
The Smurfs Original release date(s): NA: July 19, 2011; EU: July 29, 2011; AU: September 8, 2011	Release years by system: 2011—Nintendo DS
The Smurfs Original release date(s): NA: July 19, 2011; EU: July 29, 2011; AU: September 8, 2011	Notes: The Smurfs is a party game released by Ubisoft for the Nintendo DS.
The Smurfs versus Gargamels Original release date(s): NA: September 9, 2011	Release years by system: 2011—iPhone OS
The Smurfs Dance Party Original release date(s): NA: July 19, 2011; EU: July 29, 2011; AU: September 8, 2011	Release years by system: 2011—Wii
The Smurfs Dance Party Original release date(s): NA: July 19, 2011; EU: July 29, 2011; AU: September 8, 2011	Notes: The Smurfs Dance Party is a music game released by Ubisoft for the Wii. It features Just Dance-style gameplay, serving as a spin-off title.
The Smurfs Hide and Seek With Brainy Original release date(s): NA: August 30, 2012	Release years by system: 2012—iPhone OS
The Smurfs 2 Original release date(s): AU: July 18, 2013; EU: July 19, 2013; NA: July 23, 2013	Release years by system: 2013—Wii, Wii U, Nintendo DS, PlayStation 3, Xbox 360
The Smurfs Original release date(s): EU: 2 July 2015; NA: 13 October 2015	Release years by system: 2015—Nintendo 3DS
The Smurfs Original release date(s): EU: 2 July 2015; NA: 13 October 2015	Notes: The Smurfs is a 2015 adventure-party game developed by Magic Pockets and published by Ubisoft. This game mainly consists of a collection of minigames that advance the story, where the player has to rebuild the Smurf Village due to it being destroyed by Gargamel.
The Smurfs Epic Run Original release date(s): NA: 2015	Release years by system: 2015—iPhone OS
The Smurfs: Mission Vileaf Original release date(s): WW: October 25, 2021	Release years by system: 2021—Microsoft Windows, Nintendo Switch, PlayStation 4, Xbox One; 2022—PlayStation 5, Xbox Series X and Series S
The Smurfs: Mission Vileaf Original release date(s): WW: October 25, 2021	Notes: Developed by OSome Studios and published by Microids.
The Smurfs 2: The Prisoner of the Green Stone Original release date(s): WW: November 2, 2022	Release years by system: 2022—Microsoft Windows, Nintendo Switch, PlayStation 4, Xbox One, PlayStation 5, Xbox Series X and Series S, GeForce Now
The Smurfs 2: The Prisoner of the Green Stone Original release date(s): WW: November 2, 2022	Notes: Developed by OSome Studios and published by Microids.
Smurfs Kart Original release date(s): WW: November 15, 2022	Release years by system: 2022—Nintendo Switch; 2023—PlayStation 5, Xbox Series X and Series S
Smurfs Kart Original release date(s): WW: November 15, 2022	Notes: Developed by Eden Games and published by Microids.
The Smurfs: Village Party Original release date(s): WW: June 6, 2024	Release years by system: 2024—Microsoft Windows, Nintendo Switch, PlayStation 4, PlayStation 5, Xbox One, Xbox Series X and Series S
The Smurfs: Village Party Original release date(s): WW: June 6, 2024	Notes: Developed by Balio Studio and published by Microids.
The Smurfs: Dreams Original release date(s): WW: October 24, 2024	Release years by system: 2024—Microsoft Windows, Nintendo Switch, PlayStation 4, PlayStation 5, Xbox One, Xbox Series X and Series S
The Smurfs: Dreams Original release date(s): WW: October 24, 2024	Notes: Developed by Ocellus Services and published by Microids.
