= Hot Potato =

Hot Potato may refer to:

- Hot potato, a party game involving tossing a small object
- Hot Potato (video game), a 2001 Game Boy Advance video game

== Computing ==
- Hot potato routing, a networking strategy

== Film and television ==
- Hot Potato (1976 film), a 1976 American action movie
- Hot Potato (1979 film), a 1979 Italian comedy movie
- Hot Potato (game show), a 1984 American TV show
- The Hot Potato, a 2011 British crime thriller movie

== Music ==
- Hot Potatoes: The Best of Devo, compilation album by Devo
- "Hot Potato" (La Toya Jackson song), 1984
- "Hot Potato" (The Wiggles song), 1994
- "Hot Potatoes", song by the Kinks from Everybody's in Show-Biz, 1972

== See also ==
- Baked potatoes
