= Dropship =

Dropship or drop ship may refer to:

- Drop shipping, a retailing practice of sending items from a manufacturer directly to a customer
- Dropship (science fiction), a military landing craft in science fiction
- Dropship (software), a program to copy files from Dropbox accounts using their hashes
- Dropship: United Peace Force, a video game for the PlayStation 2
