= Lifesigns =

Lifesigns may refer to:

- Lifesigns (band), an English progressive rock band
- Lifesigns (Star Trek: Voyager), an episode of Star Trek: Voyager

== See also ==
- LifeSigns: Surgical Unit, an adventure game for the Nintendo DS
