= Ballistic: Ecks vs. Sever (video game) =

2002 video game

- Developer: Crawfish Interactive
- Publisher: BAM! Entertainment
- Platform: Game Boy Advance
- Release: NA: September 26, 2002; EU: November 8, 2002
- Genre: First-person shooter
- Modes: Single-player, multiplayer

Ballistic: Ecks vs. Sever (known as Ecks vs. Sever II: Ballistic in Europe) is a first-person shooter video game for the Game Boy Advance handheld game console, developed by Crawfish Interactive and published by BAM! Entertainment in September 2002. It is the second video game based on the 2002 film Ballistic: Ecks vs. Sever, the first being Ecks vs. Sever. While that game was based on an early draft of Ecks vs. Sever's script, Ballistic, bearing its ultimate title, is based on its final, theatrical cut.

== Reception ==
Reception

Aggregate score
Aggregator	Score
Metacritic	72/100

Review score
Publication	Score
IGN	8.4/10

The first level of Ecks' campaign was criticized for having a difficult hedge maze that discouraged many gamers. The game reportedly lagged if many enemies and objects were on-screen in certain levels. The sound effects were considered much improved from the first game. IGN gave the game a 8.4 ("great"), saying that although the movie was a "dud" the game improved the first game in every way.
