= Ecks vs. Sever =

2001 video game

- North American cover art
- Developer: Crawfish Interactive
- Publisher: BAM! Entertainment
- Director: Michael Merren
- Producer: Tim Mawson
- Designers: Mark Frazer; Jake May; Robert Stevens; Simon Handby; William Greenough; David Murphy; Tim Mawson
- Platform: Game Boy Advance
- Release: NA: November 20, 2001; EU: December 7, 2001
- Genre: First-person shooter
- Modes: Single-player, multiplayer

Ecks vs. Sever is a first-person shooter video game developed by Crawfish Interactive and released for the Game Boy Advance in November 2001. It is based on an early script of the 2002 film Ballistic: Ecks vs. Sever. The sequel Ballistic: Ecks vs. Sever follows its plot line more closely than the first game does. Ecks vs. Sever received positive reviews and is considered one of the best first-person shooters for the Game Boy Advance.

== Gameplay ==
At the beginning of the game, players choose which character, Ecks or Sever, they wish to control. Both characters' plots intertwine and are given different level designs for each of their missions, amounting to eleven per character, with occasional boss battles against the other character. A password system is used to maintain player progress, with each level's password starting with the same first letter as the name of the character it is associated with. The gameplay is similar to other early FPS titles such as Doom, in that all of the graphics for enemies and weapons are 2D sprites in a 3D setting, and the controls utilize the D-pad for tank-like movement and shoulder buttons for strafing.

== Development ==
A gameplay screenshot for Ecks vs. Sever. The game utilized a 3D raycasting engine for the GBA, which was developed by Crawfish.

Ecks vs. Sever was developed by Crawfish Interactive, which obtained the license to create the game based on an early rendition of a script for Ballistic: Ecks vs. Sever, an upcoming action film which had not yet entered production. The close relationship between game publisher BAM! Entertainment and Franchise Pictures allowed for the option to develop games based on any of the film company's received scripts. Video game producer Tim Mawson explained that the decision to release the game prior to the film was based on the confidence by Bam! and Crawfish that Ecks vs. Sever was "a good enough game to stand on its own two feet". Mawson further stated that the creative team was "given free reign [sic] to a degree", allowing them mold a gameplay model around the base narrative, characters, and environments already provided. The team constantly referred to the film script during the early developmental phases "to ensure the gameplay elements were relevant to the license in terms of atmosphere, theme and content".

The Ecks vs. Sever video game was in development for about ten months. Because the game began production long before the release of the film, adjustments had to be made based on the changing screenplay. Most notably, the titular lead Sever was switched from male to female, forcing Crawfish to replace the graphical artwork for that character. Ecks vs. Sever utilizes an in-house graphics engine, first showcased by Crawfish with the opening level of Doom II, leading up to the launch of the GBA. This "pseudo-3D" engine lacks sloping floors, rooms above rooms, and textured ceilings so the game can run quicker. Mawson admitted that building a proprietary, first-person engine for the GBA was very difficult, requiring much trial and error. Crawfish's 3D raycasting engine for Ecks vs. Sever was originally written in C, but was later optimized into machine code for higher processing speeds. Lighting effects and more sprites existed in early stages of the project's development, but were scrapped to maintain acceptable frame rates. Multiplayer levels were also adjusted to prevent engine slowdown. Bam! European developmental director Joe Booth felt that although the game's engine was meant to "push the GBA envelope" of environment interaction and background animation, its multiple game modes set it apart from other FPSs on the handheld.

A PlayStation 2 version of Ecks vs. Sever was in development by Zombie Studios and slated for release in November 2002. However, it was eventually cancelled.

== Reception ==
Reception

Aggregate score
Aggregator	Score
Metacritic	80/100

Review scores
Publication	Score
GamePro	4.5/5
GameSpot	7.1/10
GameSpy	82/100
IGN	9/10
X-Play	3/5

While the film is considered one of the worst ever made, the game Ecks vs. Sever received positive reviews, garnering an aggregate score of 80 out of 100 on Metacritic. IGN gave the game an "outstanding" 9.0/10 and an Editor's Choice award, calling it "the best GBA first person shooter to date" and "one of the best four player games made yet for the Game Boy Advance."
