= Riding Spirits =

2002 video game

- North American cover art
- Developer: Spike
- Publishers: JP: Spike; INT: BAM! Entertainment
- Platform: PlayStation 2
- Release: JP: July 25, 2002; NA: September 10, 2002; EU: October 18, 2002
- Genre: Racing
- Modes: Single-player, multiplayer

Riding Spirits (also known as RS: Riding Spirits) is a 2002 motorcycle racing video game published by Spike in Japan and BAM! Entertainment in other countries for the PlayStation 2.

== Gameplay ==
Inspired by Gran Turismo 3: A-Spec, Riding Spirits offers over 100 motorcycles and a number of different riding options. Building a perfect racing machine and unlocking the new ones is handled through racing and earning money to buy better equipment, which can make a difference in the performance. The game's career mode is called the Riding Spirits, and is split up into three classes that are progressively more difficult, for a total of 40 racing events. There is also a test run option that lets the player measure acceleration and overall top speed.

As a way to gain experience, there are Safety Riding tests that cover every aspect of motorcycle racing and 20 Circuit Riding situations that help scouting out specific, tricky maneuvers on certain tracks. The players are given a choice of a normal or widescreen display, as well as vertical or horizontal split screen for multiplayer. The structure of Riding Spirits is similar to other racing games, offering an Arcade mode with a selection of different categories and taking them around some of the game's tracks. Controlling the rider and the bike is completely configurable (making the game lean more into a simulation), where the player can assign buttons for manually leaning left and right, and sitting up or down on the bike to increase or decrease as needed.

== Development ==
Riding Spirits was in development for more than 2 years.

== Sequel ==
A sequel, titled Riding Spirits II, was released on February 26, 2004, in Japan and was published by Capcom on May 21 in Europe.

== Reception ==
Reception

Aggregate score
Aggregator	Score
Metacritic	59/100

Review scores
Publication	Score
GameSpot	5.9/10
IGN	6.1/10
PlayStation Official Magazine – UK	7/10

Riding Spirits received "mixed or average" reviews, according to review aggregator Metacritic.
