= Chase: Hollywood Stunt Driver =

2002 video game

- Developer: I-Imagine Interactive
- Publisher: BAM! Entertainment
- Platform: Xbox
- Release: PAL: September 20, 2002; NA: September 24, 2002
- Genres: Racing, action
- Modes: Single-player, multiplayer

Chase: Hollywood Stunt Driver is a 2002 racing game developed by I-Imagine Interactive and published by BAM! Entertainment for the Xbox. It is an arcade racing game in which players complete races and perform stunts and tricks as a stunt performer for scenes in various movies.

Originally developed without a publisher as an intended multiplatform title, the game was the first recipient of the Microsoft Incubator Program, an initiative supporting independent developers to publish titles on the Xbox. Upon release, the game was met with a mixed reception, with critics praising the variety of vehicles but critiquing the game's repetition.

== Gameplay ==
A screenshot of gameplay in Chase: Hollywood Stunt Driver

Chase is an arcade-style racing game in which players navigate through time-limited courses in various vehicles to perform a series of stunts, tricks and races to unlock new levels and game modes. The game features fifteen drivable vehicles, including cars, motorcycles, a missile truck and a tuk tuk. The game features three gameplay modes. In 'Career' mode, players drive various vehicles through sixteen scenes, completing an open-ended series of goals including completing the course within a time limit, hitting markers, vehicles and objects, completing jumps and powerslides, and performing stunts. Basic ground and air stunts are performed automatically with a single button, or the directional buttons when airborne. Players progress in the game by earning reputation points from completing objectives in a scene, requiring the player to replay the level several times. Career mode milestones unlock various 'Challenge' modes, allowing the player to complete secondary tasks in three events, 'Jump', involving clearing a car over buses, 'Stunt Point', requiring the player to earn as many points as possible in an area, and 'Stunt Race', in which players compete in a race against a rival stuntman. The game also features a multiplayer mode, featuring the same modes as 'Challenge' mode, with an additional tag game.

== Plot ==
Players take on the role of professional stuntwoman Chase Corrada as she performs vehicular stunts for various films, following in the footsteps of her father, Griffin Corrada, a famous stuntman. Mr. Chin, a famous Hong Kong director, takes patronage in Chase and invites her to do stunt work in his films. Chase's success leads her into a rivalry with competing stuntman Rick Baen, who is jealous that Chase is selected as the lead stunt driver in Mr. Chin's movies. Driven by anger and a desire to see Chase fall, Rick is willing to go to dangerous extremes on camera to outplay Chase in the field. Chase's work takes her across scenes in films of various genres, including a gangster film, a futuristic wasteland, a spy adventure, and an Asian city.

== Development ==
Chase was developed by I-Imagine Interactive, a South African independent developer, at the time the only licensed console developer on the African continent. Development of the game took place from October 1999 with a final team of thirteen developers, with the original working title of Chase Corrada: Hollywood Stunt Driver. I-Imagine managing director Dan Wagner stated the game was inspired by games such as Crazy Taxi, San Francisco Rush: Extreme Racing and Driver, and films including Ronin, Gone in 60 Seconds and the James Bond movies. The stunt theme of the game was conceived as a way of implementing "unique environments and vehicles" beyond the normal scope of a driving game. The game was originally conceived as a multiplatform title for computers and the PlayStation, but rejected offers by publishers to market the game as a budget title. Following positive reception of a demo at the European Consumer Trade Show in 2000, Microsoft invited I-Imagine to become part of the Incubator Program, a program assisting independent developers to create an Xbox title with the use of the Xbox Development Kit. As part of the program, Microsoft provided technical support, testing and advice on gameplay features. During this period, Chase "went through major content changes" to adapt the game as an Xbox exclusive. The program and backing from Microsoft allowed I-Imagine to secure a publisher, BAM! Entertainment, for the game.

The game was frequently compared to Stuntman, a game with a similar concept released for the PlayStation 2 by Reflections Interactive in June. Wagner noted that they were confident that Chase was an original concept due to the earlier development timeframes and visibility to publishers as early as 2000, and distinguished the game with its objective-based gameplay.

== Reception ==
Reception

Aggregate score
Aggregator	Score
Metacritic	60

Review scores
Publication	Score
AllGame	2/5
GameSpot	6.5
GameSpy	83%
IGN	4.9
Xbox Nation (XBN)	5/10

Chase received "mixed or average reviews", according to review aggregator Metacritic, with an average score of 60%. Critics were mixed on the implementation of the gameplay and objective system. GameSpy praised the game's "variety", but noted that the game did not have "enough information given to know what you'll face in a scene", citing a high level of repetition and "trial and error" to complete successful runs. Describing the game as "lifeless" and lacking in "ingenuity" and "excitement", IGN found the objectives to be "a bit too easy", finding the "action (was) too slow" and the stunt tricks lacked the complexity to make the game worthwhile. Xbox Nation wrote that the emphasis on replaying levels led to "little tension or motivation to get (a) perfect take".

The physics and control scheme also received mixed reception. GameSpot found the mechanics to be "solid", with the controls being "responsive and set up very intuitively", with the physics system "striking a good balance between real-world and fantasy physics, giving you both predictable control and fantastic crashes and jumps." IGN critiqued the game's "stubborn" controls and "slow" action, noting that whilst there was variety to the handling of the vehicles, many were too "exaggerated", describing them as "sometimes a pain to control". Xbox Nation noted that whilst the controls were "fairly responsive", the game lacked a "real sense of speed while driving".
