= Mary-Kate and Ashley: Get A Clue =

2000 video game

- Developer: Crawfish Interactive
- Publisher: Acclaim Entertainment
- Platform: Game Boy Color
- Release: May 31, 2000

Mary-Kate and Ashley: Get A Clue! is a 2000 video game developed by Crawfish Interactive and published by Acclaim Entertainment. Mary-Kate and Ashley: Get a Clue! was released for the Game Boy Color on May 31, 2000, and represented part of Club Acclaim, a push by Acclaim to attract more girls and families to video games.

== Gameplay ==
Mary-Kate & Ashley: Get a Clue! is a puzzle-based platformer where players control Mary-Kate, Ashley, and their dog, Clue, independently. The gameplay requires teamwork between the three characters to solve puzzles across five "cases," each containing ten levels. Each character has unique abilities: Mary-Kate can bounce others to higher platforms, Ashley can pull switches and throw the dog to defeat enemies, and Clue can fit into small spaces and carry the twins. Players must strategically switch between characters to overcome obstacles, unlock gates, and collect puzzle pieces while avoiding hazards. Hints can be gathered by collecting "clue" icons. The game has limited lives and a password system that only saves progress after completing an entire case. The game features digitized images and audio of the Olsen twins.

== Development ==
The game was announced in February 2000.

== Reception ==
Reception

Review scores
Publication	Score
All Game Guide	2.5/5
IGN	6/10
The Journal Times	4/5

IGN gave the game a score of 6 out of 10 stating, "The game is exactly the same as the last version with slight changes in the sprite animations which means, it's not all that bad. It's just disappointing to see that Acclaim is green-lighting the technique of duplicating existing games for "new" titles."

The Journal Times gave the game a score of 4 out of 5, stating, "It is simple to follow, and the step-by-step thinking process is good for girls ages 8 and older. I don't think boys will get it."

The game appeared on PC Data list of Top-Selling Game Boy games.
