= Yummy Yummy (album) =

1994 studio album by The Wiggles

Studio album by the Wiggles
- Released: 22 April 1994
- Recorded: 1993–1994
- Studios: Noisegate Studios and Tracking Station Studios
- Genre: Children's music
- Length: 28:06
- Label: ABC Music
- Producers: Murray Cook, Jeff Fatt, Anthony Field, Greg Page

The Wiggles chronology
Stories and Songs: The Adventures of Captain Feathersword the Friendly Pirate (1993)	Yummy Yummy (1994)	Big Red Car (1995)

Yummy Yummy is the fourth studio album by Australian children's music group the Wiggles. it was released in 1994 by ABC Music. A companion video was also made in 1994, and it was re-recorded in 1998.

== Track listing ==
All tracks are written by (or trad arr. by) Murray Cook, Jeff Fatt, Anthony Field and Greg Page except spoken and listed below

AUS (1994) track list
No.	Title	Writer(s)	Length
1.	"Hot Potato"	John Field, Cook, Fatt, Field, Page	1:14
2.	"Shaky Shaky"		1:26
3.	"Fruit Salad Intro" (spoken)		0:14
4.	"Fruit Salad"		2:28
5.	"Willaby Wallaby Woo"	Raffi, Dennis Lee, Larry Miyata	1:34
6.	"Come on Let's Jump"		0:41
7.	"Walk"		1:19
8.	"Fais Do Do"		1:20
9.	"Ponies"		0:56
10.	"The Monkey Dance"	John Field, Cook, Fatt, Field, Page	2:01
11.	"D.O.R.O.T.H.Y. (My Favourite Dinosaur)"	John Field, Cook, Fatt, Field, Page	2:25
12.	"Shake Your Sillies Out"	Raffi, Bert Simpson, Bonnie Simpson	1:37
13.	"Numbers Joke" (spoken)		0:16
14.	"Numbers Rhumba"	David Walden, Arr. Cook, Fatt, Field, Page	1:59
15.	"Would You Giggle"		0:43
16.	"Food Poem" (spoken)		0:15
17.	"Crunchy Munchy Honey Cakes"		1:55
18.	"Butterflies Flit"	Marie Field, Cook, Fatt, Field, Page	0:38
19.	"Where is Thumbkin?"		3:14
20.	"Veil"		0:48
21.	"Yawn Yawn Yawn"		1:39
Total length:			28:06

US (1999) track list
No.	Title	Writer(s)	Length
1.	"Hot Potato"	Cook, Fatt, Field, Page, John Field	1:21
2.	"Shaky Shaky"		1:23
3.	"Fruit Salad Intro" (spoken)		0:11
4.	"Fruit Salad"		2:26
5.	"Captain Feathersword"		1:10
6.	"Our Boat is Rocking on the Sea"		0:52
7.	"We're Dancing with Wags the Dog"		1:21
8.	"Willaby Wallaby Woo"	Raffi, Dennis Lee, Larry Miyata	1:32
9.	"Come on Let's Jump"		0:37
10.	"Walk"		1:14
11.	"Fais Do Do"		1:15
12.	"Ponies"		0:52
13.	"The Monkey Dance"	Cook, Fatt, Field, Page, John Field	1:42
14.	"D.O.R.O.T.H.Y. (My Favorite Dinosaur)"	Cook, Fatt, Field, Page, John Field	2:07
15.	"Shake Your Sillies Out"	Raffi, Bert Simpson, Bonnie Simpson	1:34
16.	"Numbers Joke" (spoken)		0:11
17.	"Numbers Rhumba"	D. Walden	1:47
18.	"Would You Giggle"		0:40
19.	"Food Poem" (spoken)		0:10
20.	"Crunchy Munchy Honey Cakes"		1:51
21.	"The Chase" (instrumental)		3:55
22.	"Butterflies Flit"	Cook, Fatt, Field, Page, Marie Field	0:33
23.	"Where is Thumbkin?"		3:11
24.	"Veil" (instrumental)		0:44
25.	"Yawn Yawn Yawn"		1:37
Total length:			35:09

== Personnel ==
=== The Wiggles ===
- Murray Cook – guitar, bass guitar, backing vocals
- Anthony Field – backing vocals, guitar, bass guitar
- Jeff Fatt – piano, organ, accordion, backing vocals
- Greg Page – lead vocals, guitar

=== Additional musicians ===
- Tony Henry – drums, percussion
- Greg Truman – backing vocals
- Peter Mackie – guitar
- Trina Leigh – children's voices
- Allison O'Brien – children's voices

== Release information ==
The CD was released in 1994 under ABC for Kids: 8143372.

In 1999, a version distributed by Lyrick Studios was released in the United States.

In 2023, a limited edition vinyl record was released through Impressed Recordings. It was limited to 500 copies, 125 for each colour worn by the Wiggles.

== Charting ==
In December 2003, the US version of the album reached number 31 on Billboard's Top Heatseekers and number 29 on their Top Independent Albums charts.

== Video ==
Yummy Yummy
- VHS cover
- Directed by: Tim Finlay
- Written by: The Wiggles
- Produced by: John Spence, Phillip Cullen
- Music by: The Wiggles
- Distributed by: Roadshow Entertainment / ABC Video (#14480)
- Release date: October 1994
- Running time: 40 minutes
- Country: Australia

Yummy Yummy, released in 1994, is the second video by the Australian children's band the Wiggles. It is the first Wiggles video to feature chroma key backgrounding.

=== Songs and skits ===
This is the song and skits list for the original 1994 version:

1. Hot Potato
2. Shaky Shaky
3. Teddy Bear Hug
4. D.O.R.O.T.H.Y. (My Favourite Dinosaur)
  * Greg's magic show skit
5. I Am a Dancer
6. Crunchy Munchy Honey Cakes
7. Numbers Rhumba
8. Joannie Works with One Hammer
9. The Monkey Dance
10. Henry's Dance
11. Walk
12. Dorothy's Birthday Party (Short Story)
13. Fruit Salad

=== Cast ===
The Wiggles are:

- Jeff Fatt
- Greg Page
- Murray Cook
- Anthony Field

Sue McAuley portrayed a dancer named Vanessa, and Dorothy's helper. Jacqueline Fallon portrayed Dorothy's helper. Vanessa Fallon-Rohanna portrayed Lucy Fixit and Henry's helper. Darren Phillips portrayed Henry's helper. Anthony's father John Patrick Field portrayed the cook. Anthony's brother John William Field portrayed Captain Feathersword's helper.

==== Later video releases ====
In 2018, the 1994 video version of Yummy Yummy was released in multiple segments on their YouTube channel as Classic Wiggles.

== 1998 re-recording ==
Yummy Yummy (re-recording)
- Directed by: Chisholm McTavish
- Written by: The Wiggles
- Produced by: Nick Pike
- Edited by: Tony Douglass; Steve Rees; Chisholm McTavish
- Music by: The Wiggles
- Distributed by: Roadshow Entertainment / ABC Video (#101409)
- Release date: 13 April 1998
- Running time: 36 minutes
- Country: Australia

The video was remade and released in 1998 after the theatrical and video releases of The Wiggles Movie and the video release of Wiggly, Wiggly Christmas. Some of the skits such as the short story for Dorothy's Birthday Party were removed. Two new songs, "Pufferbillies" and "Havenu Shalom Alechem", were added. In the North American and UK versions, "Teddy Bear Hug" and "Numbers Rhumba" were replaced by videos featuring the Wiggle Puppets. The Wiggles use logos on their shirts. Anthony wears a blue shirt instead of a green one. Paul Paddick plays Captain Feathersword. Wags the Dog was also featured in the video. Paul Hester, a former drummer for Split Enz and Crowded House, guest starred as Paul the Cook, and was featured in "Fruit Salad".

=== Songs and skits ===
==== Australian version ====
1. Hot Potato
2. D.O.R.O.T.H.Y. (My Favourite Dinosaur)
3. Pufferbillies
4. Henry's Dance
5. Walk
6. Joannie Works with One Hammer
7. The Monkey Dance
8. Crunchy Munchy Honey Cakes
9. Shaky Shaky
10. Teddy Bear Hug
11. Havenu Shalom Alechem
12. I Am a Dancer
  * Greg's Magic Show skit
13. Numbers Rhumba
14. Fruit Salad
15. Henry's Dance (Instrumental)

==== North American/UK version ====
1. Hot Potato
2. D.O.R.O.T.H.Y. (My Favorite Dinosaur)
3. Pufferbillies
4. Henry's Dance
5. Walk
6. Joannie Works with One Hammer
7. The Monkey Dance
8. Crunchy Munchy Honey Cakes
9. Shaky Shaky
10. Wigglemix (Wiggle Puppets)
11. Havenu Shalom Alechem
12. I Am a Dancer
  * Greg's Magic Show skit
13. Go Captain Feathersword Ahoy! (Wiggle Puppets)
14. Fruit Salad
15. Henry's Dance (Instrumental)

=== Cast ===
The Wiggles are:

- Murray Cook
- Jeff Fatt
- Greg Page
- Anthony Field

Also featuring:

- Leeanne Ashley as Dorothy the Dinosaur
- Paul Paddick as Captain Feathersword
- Edward Rooke as Wags the Dog
- Donna Halloran and Leanne Halloran as Henry the Octopus
- Paul Hester as the chef

=== Release history ===
Yummy Yummy was released on video along with Wiggle Time in the United States on 12 October 1999.

In 2002, the Wiggles released Yummy Yummy and Wiggle Time as a combined DVD of the 1998 versions of Yummy Yummy and Wiggle Time.

In 2019, the 1998 video version of Yummy Yummy was released in multiple segments on their YouTube channel as Classic Wiggles.
