= Micro Maniacs =

2000 video game

- European PlayStation box art
- Developer: Codemasters
- Publishers: Codemasters; THQ (GBC)
- Series: Micro Machines
- Platforms: PlayStation, Game Boy Color
- Release: PlayStation: EU: 7 April 2000; NA: 26 September 2000; Game Boy Color: EU: 2 November 2001; AU: 12 November 2001
- Genre: Racing
- Modes: Single-player, multiplayer

Micro Maniacs is a racing video game developed by Codemasters for PlayStation and Game Boy Color. It is a spin-off to the Micro Machines games, the main difference being that players control tiny characters where a few racetracks feature the use of vehicles. The North American PlayStation release was sponsored and endorsed by Fox Kids, branding the game in the region as FoxKids.com Micro Maniacs Racing. It was scheduled to be released in June 2000, but was delayed to late September.

== Plot ==
Micro Maniacs is set in a time where the Earth's resources are being depleted and the very planet is at risk. However, a scientist named Dr. Minimizer has an idea: using a device he calls "The Minimizer Ray", he will shrink the planet's population to 1/360 of its original size, and so create a world more suitable to our current status. If this is to be successful, the doctor needs to create a supersoldier: somebody who can prepare the planet for us when we are eventually minimized. In order to do this, the doctor enlists the help of 12 volunteers for an experiment. The experiment consists of racetracks that are considered various dangerous environments as to ascertain the suitable skills for the supersoldier.

== Gameplay ==
The player is controlling the character V4, who according to the data on the right is in third in Challenge mode. The timer is in the top-left of the screen and the player's power-ups in the bottom-left.

As opposed to previous games in the series, players control these small volunteers more than vehicles, the main difference is that the volunteers are able to jump and use individual abilities. The volunteers (or characters) are each slightly different. None are particularly realistic, but their unusual characteristics allow the characters to make use of various power-ups. These are used to attack your opponents in a race, and include things like black holes, atomic blasts, and laser mines.

Similar to the other games in the Micro Machines series, each course is based in a different environment, like a bathroom, a kitchen, a laboratory, a garage, and a bedroom. The goal is to race through the level and be the first to cross the finish line. Each course is marked out with a substance in the environment. These are related to the level in question, and include things like toothpaste, fish food and baked beans. Some courses require the use of vehicles like jet-skis, bees, motor scooters and skateboards.

Challenge
A 1 player only mode. The racer is up against 4 AI opponents in a 3 lap race. The player must come in 1st or 2nd to win a race and advance a row except for the Final Round, where 1st place is the absolute win condition.

Time Trial
In Time Trial mode, 1 to 8 players can race, using either one, or separate controllers. There are four Time Trial modes:

- TT Free Play - 1 player attempts to earn a best time.
- TT Challenge - 1 player has to beat a set lap time within three laps to progress up rows.
- TT Multiplayer - 2 to 8 players attempt to set and beat opponents lap times.
- TT Tournament - Similar to TT Multiplayer, but the aim to be the first player to a set number of points

Vs.
In Versus mode, 1-8 players have to make the other opponents disappear off the screen by running as far in front as possible to score points. The player who either fills up their points gauge, passes the finish line on the final lap with the most points, or the last person standing in Play-Off (a Sudden Death mode activated if players have the same number of points upon crossing the finish line on the last lap). Players are defined in 8 colors. There are 3 Vs. modes:

- Single Player Vs. where 1 player must race against one to seven AI opponents (changed via the main Game Settings) which progresses in a similar fashion to Challenge mode.
- Multiplayer Vs., where 2 to 8 players race to get the most points.
- Vs. Tournament, where 2 to 8 players race to get the most wins.

Vs. Teams
Vs. Teams is similar to Vs. mode, with the core difference being to score points for their team. This mode requires 3 to 8 players and contains four teams to choose from.

Training
Before any of the races begin, a training mode is started. Players can train in the circles as the level loads. This mode will also show who you are up against and any vehicles that level uses.

Bonus Tracks
In this mode, the player runs through a maze. The aim is to collect all 30 power ups within the time limit. If the player wins, they win an extra life. If they lose, they win nothing. There are 4 different bonus tracks: Blue, Green, Red and Yellow. These tracks can only be entered via Challenge, TT Challenge or Single Player Vs. if the player wins 3 races in a row in 1st place.

== Reception ==
Reception

Aggregate score
Aggregator	Score
GameRankings	75%

Review scores
Publication	Score
AllGame	3.5/5
Consoles +	(GBC) 90% (PS) 88%
Edge	7/10
Electronic Gaming Monthly	6.75/10
Famitsu	25/40
GameSpot	7.1/10
Hyper	88%
IGN	7.5/10
Jeuxvideo.com	17/20
Official U.S. PlayStation Magazine	4/5

The PlayStation version received favourable reviews according to the review aggregation website GameRankings. Other magazines gave the import favourable to average reviews while the U.S. version was still in development. In Japan, where the same console version was ported and published by Spike on 2 November 2000 under the name Denkō Sekka Micro Runner: Maniac Hakushi no Hisaku (電光石火ミクロランナー 〜マニアック博士の秘策〜, Denkō Sekka Mikuro Rannā 〜Maniakku Hakushi no Hisaku〜; lit. "Lightspeed Micro Runners: Dr. Maniac's Secret Plan"), Famitsu gave it a score of 25 out of 40.
