= Dexter's Laboratory: Mandark's Lab? =

2002 action-adventure video game

- North American box art
- Developer: Red Lemon Studios
- Publisher: BAM! Entertainment
- Producer: Heidi Behrendt
- Designer: Jay Rogers
- Programmer: Richard Evans
- Composers: Thomas Chase; Steve Rucker
- Series: Dexter's Laboratory
- Platform: PlayStation
- Release: UK: March 29, 2002; NA: April 23, 2002
- Genre: Action-adventure
- Modes: Single-player, multiplayer

Dexter's Laboratory: Mandark's Lab? is an 3D cel-shaded action-adventure video game released in 2002 for the Sony PlayStation and based on the American animated television series Dexter's Laboratory, which aired on Cartoon Network in the United States. In the game, Mandark gains access to Dexter's secret lab with the intention of destroying it, and Dexter is forced to take down his archenemy in order to reclaim it. Red Lemon Studios in Scotland developed the game for BAM! Entertainment, and it was first shown to the public at 2002's Electronic Entertainment Expo (E3). The game is designed for players 8 through 14 years of age.

== Plot ==
The game begins with Dexter's rival, Mandark, breaking into Dexter's laboratory and attempting to destroy it by reprogramming the lab's Computer to block Dexter from entering. This works, and Dexter is unable to enter without the right password, while mimicking Mandark's voice. After retrieving his voice-modulating invention from Dee Dee's cootie-ridden room, he has to dance with her in order to convince her to guess the password. Acquiring it, he successfully gets into the lab.

Finding that nothing in his lab responds to him now, he has to clear the computer systems of rogue atoms and get rid of a cyber bug that is destroying the system from the inside. Eventually he finds Mandark, who uses an early invention of Dexter's (an age-changing device) to turn Dexter into an old man. Though hindered, he is able to recharge the machine after first powering it through reliving memories.

Turned back into his normal age, he finds Mandark again, discovering that he has set a bomb to go off to destroy Dexter's large fish tank, filled with salt water that will destroy the lab. Dee Dee, having followed closely, suggests a game of wills against the two, bribing Mandark to play by promising to kiss him; if Mandark loses, he must give up the code that will deactivate the bomb. Losing to Dexter in both a chemistry experiment and ice hockey, Mandark gives a false code in response. However, Dexter had seen through it and has successfully deactivated the bomb, saving the lab. Defeated, Mandark leaves while vowing revenge. Though all seems well, the game ends with Dee Dee angering Dexter by trashing a piece of his equipment.

== Gameplay ==
Dexter's sister Dee Dee issues him a challenge.

Based on the television series, the game is set in both Dexter's house and laboratory. The game's single-player is divided into four levels with each contain puzzling challenges that feature various inventions Dexter has created. Each level contains two minigames which the player must find and complete to advance to the next level. The game features a total of eight minigames which can be played alone or in a two-player mode, with one person playing as Dexter and the other as Mandark. The minigames include Dee Dee's Dance Off, Cootie Call, Up N Atom, and Dexter Dodge Ball. In each level, players can also unlock a different improved invention by collecting four blueprint pieces hidden in the level. The improved inventions make it easier to complete the minigames in that level. While the main game features 3D cel-shaded graphics, certain cutscenes are presented in the 2D animation style of the series. Unlockable extras are available through the "Dexter's Vault" entry on the main menu.

== Reception ==
Reception

Aggregate score
Aggregator	Score
Metacritic	62%

Review scores
Publication	Score
AllGame	3/5
GameZone	5.8/10
PlayStation Illustrated	70%
PSXNation.com	52%

Based on four reviews, the game received a score of 62% on Metacritic, corresponding to a "mixed or average" rating. AllGame's reviewer Jennifer Beam appreciated the game's animated cutscenes and said they were "like watching the show itself and the characters are depicted relatively well." Beam also praised the game's voice work for Dexter, performed by Candi Milo who also does the voice for Dexter on the television series. Troy Oxford of The Atlanta Journal-Constitution said the mini-games make the title a success. PSIllustrated's Stephen Triche also praised the game's graphics, but he was dissatisfied with the game on the whole and found the minigames to be dull: "I get the feeling Red-Lemon Studios used a young target audience as an excuse for making a game that I've quite simply found lacking."
