= Superman: Countdown to Apokolips =

2003 video game

- US box art
- Developer: Mistic Software
- Publisher: Infogrames (Note: Released under the Atari brand name)
- Platform: Game Boy Advance
- Release: NA: March 26, 2003; EU: April 25, 2003
- Genre: Action
- Mode: Single-player

Superman: Countdown to Apokolips is a 2003 action video game for the Game Boy Advance, developed by Canadian studio Mistic Software and published by Infogrames under the Atari brand name. It was based on Superman: The Animated Series.

== Gameplay ==
The game takes place in a city and utilizes an isometric perspective. The main goal is to save hostages by defeating their captors. The player can use map icons to locate encounters.

They can unlock an extra level by achieving top ranking in every stage. A perfect score is obtained by punching enemies instead of using other attacks.

Superman can either fly or use super speed to move across levels. His powers include heat vision and freeze breath. He can also punch and shoulder-charge his enemies, as well as throw large objects, such as cars and tanks, at them.

Progress can't be saved during levels. Instead, the game employs a password system to allow players to resume progress after shutting down their console.

== Plot ==
The game serves as a prequel to the events of Superman: Shadow of Apokolips.

Agents of Darkseid come to Earth to bring down the Man of Steel. Meanwhile, Kalibak kidnaps Lois Lane, and Livewire, Metallo, and Bruno Mannheim escape from prison.

== Development ==
Initially the project was handled by Crawfish Interactive, but the studio closed in November 2002. As a result, Superman: Countdown to Apokolips's artwork and source code were sent back to the publisher, Infogrames. The game was later picked up and finished by Mistic Software.

Countdown to Apokolips was based on Superman: The Animated Series, adopting its art style. It does not, however, use any of the series' soundtrack.

== Reception ==
Reception

Aggregate scores
Aggregator	Score
GameRankings	45%
Metacritic	47/100

Review scores
Publication	Score
AllGame	2/5
IGN	4.5/10
Nintendo Power	2.6/5

The game received generally unfavorable reviews according to Metacritic. Much of the criticism focused on repetitive gameplay, but the graphics were praised. IGN's Craig Harris called the game a "mediocre action game" and noted that much of the game could be completed with a long-range attack move that negated level design.
