= Reign of Fire (video game) =

2002 video game

- PAL region PS2 cover art
- Developers: Kuju London (Note: Ported to GameCube by BAM! Studios Europe.); Crawfish Interactive (GBA)
- Publisher: BAM! Entertainment
- Composer: James Hannigan
- Platforms: Game Boy Advance; Xbox; GameCube; PlayStation 2
- Release: PlayStation 2, Xbox: NA: October 22, 2002; PAL: November 15, 2002; Game Boy Advance: NA: October 31, 2002; PAL: November 15, 2002; GameCube: NA: November 26, 2002; PAL: November 29, 2002
- Genre: Action-adventure
- Mode: Single-player

Reign of Fire is a 2002 action-adventure game published by BAM! Entertainment. It is based on the 2002 film of the same name, in which dragons have annihilated the majority of the human race, and the survivors attempt to fight back using scavenged military hardware. The plot of the game, however, differs significantly from the film.

== Gameplay ==
The game allows the player to play as both a dragon and a human. As a human, the player takes the role of a survivor, in a third-person vehicle-based shooter – tanks and jeeps most notably, which can all carry rockets and machine gun turrets; if the player is touched by fire from a dragon they must find water to douse the flames or they will die.

As a dragon, the player takes the role of a maturing dragon able to use fireballs to engage targets at range, napalm breath to set targets alight and using their talons to pick up items (including enemy combatants) and use them as makeshift bombs to attack ground targets.

== Plot ==
The game's story is divided into two campaigns; human and dragon. The human campaign loosely follows the plot of the film, with significant differences. Meanwhile, the dragon campaign chronicles the early years of the human/dragon war up to the game's present timeline. The dragon campaign features an alternative ending in the final mission.

=== Human ===
The human campaign begins with the player taking the role of the "Kid", a new recruit to the Kentucky Irregulars. Hailing from the former United States, the Irregulars are a group of paramilitary dragon slayers and are led by Denton Van Zan. The Irregulars defend the Fort, an old castle in Northumberland that houses a population of survivors led by Quinn Abercromby. The Irregulars are tasked with warding off attacks, firefighting, and rescuing civilians.

Like in the film, Van Zan concludes that all dragons thus far have been female, and that there must be a single male that is key to reproduction. To prove his theory, Van Zan leads the Irregulars to the ruins of a coastal military base in Dover, now used by the dragons as a nesting ground. Upon arrival, Van Zan sends the Kid alone to retrieve dragon eggs while the majority of the brood is away. The Kid manages to successfully retrieve enough eggs before escaping the returning dragons with the Irregulars. Van Zan confirms his theory and leads the Irregulars to London, intending to kill the sole male dragon, known as the "Bull".

Once in London, the Irregulars face heavy resistance from the dragons. Van Zan devises a plan to lure out the Bull by destroying several dragon nests. The plan is successful and the Bull arrives. Quinn distracts the Bull while the Kid, Van Zan, and the remaining Irregulars concentrate fire on the Bull, eventually critically injuring the Bull's wings. Van Zan sends the Kid to finish off the Bull deep in dragon territory. After a long and difficult battle, the Kid kills the Bull, ending the dragon threat.

=== Dragon ===
In the dragon campaign, the player assumes the role of a young dragon with above-average intelligence, evident by her ability to adapt and exploit situations tactically and strategically. The campaign begins during the early years of the human–dragon war, in which organized human resistance is still significant, but waning. The player dragon assists her sisters in assaulting the Tower of London, the last human stronghold in the city. The dragons are victorious, obliterating the Tower and a nearby warship, pushing the humans out of London.

Some time later, the player dragon attempts to rescue captured dragons from an armoured train heading to a large coastal military base in Dover (the same base featured in the human campaign). The player dragon rescues her sisters and destroys the train, before following the tracks to the base. The base is heavily defended, with the base's array of large-calibre artillery posing a significant threat to the dragons. The player dragon sneaks into the base from the ocean port, annihilating coastal guns, anti-air defences, warships, and finally the superguns. With their last line of defence destroyed, the human military presence in England is broken and the remaining survivors scattered.

The game jumps forward to the year 2020. The player dragon, now fully mature, repeatedly clashes with the Kentucky Irregulars and the survivors in the Fort. The player dragon causes chaos by disrupting Irregular operations and destroying the Fort's food supply. The final mission also presents an alternative ending, in which the dragons assault the Fort with the assistance of the Bull. Despite heavy resistance, the dragons wipe out the defenders and destroy the Fort, permanently establishing dragons as the dominant species.

== Development ==
Reign of Fire is based around the film's plot, with the addition of many extra creatures and military hardware not seen in the film.

== Reception ==
Reign of Fire received "mixed or average" reviews, according to review aggregator Metacritic.
