= Dexter's Laboratory: Deesaster Strikes! =

2001 action-adventure video game

- Developer: Virtucraft
- Publisher: BAM! Entertainment
- Producer: Anne-Christine Gasc
- Designer: Brian Beuken
- Programmer: Brian Beuken
- Composer: Manfred Linzner
- Series: Dexter's Laboratory
- Platform: Game Boy Advance
- Release: NA: September 26, 2001; PAL: November 2, 2001
- Genre: Action-adventure
- Mode: Single-player

Dexter's Laboratory: Deesaster Strikes! is a 2001 action-adventure video game for the Game Boy Advance based on the Cartoon Network animated series Dexter's Laboratory. It was released in North America on September 26, 2001, and in the PAL region on November 2, 2001.

== Plot ==
Dexter navigates his laboratory.

Dexter's sister Dee Dee goes into Dexter's clone machine and creates dozens of copies of herself. Dexter has to catch all of the clones and fix all of the machines that they broke. While Dexter tries to catch all of the clones, he has to fight monsters and robots. There are 70 levels and 8 areas.

== Reception ==
Clarence Worley of Game Over Online Magazine said that the game is entertaining, but that the design is plain. A GameZone review said that the game is well made and has excellent graphics.
