= Aliens: Thanatos Encounter =

2001 video game

- Developer: Crawfish Interactive
- Publisher: THQ
- Series: Alien
- Platform: Game Boy Color
- Release: NA: 21 March 2001; EU: 13 April 2001
- Genre: Shooter
- Mode: Single-player

Aliens: Thanatos Encounter is a 2001 shooter video game developed by Crawfish Interactive and based on the Alien science-fiction horror film series. It was published by THQ and released for the Game Boy Color handheld game console. The game takes place aboard Thanatos, an abandoned freighter that has been infested with Alien creatures.

== Gameplay ==
The game is presented from a top-down perspective. The player's weapon and motion tracker are displayed at the bottom of the screen.

Aliens: Thanatos Encounter is a single-player shooter based on the Alien science-fiction horror film series. It takes place aboard Thanatos, an abandoned freighter that has been infested with Alien creatures. The game is played from a top-down perspective and features 12 levels, each available in three difficulty settings. In each level, the player must clear areas of Alien creatures and rescue survivors to progress. There are five Colonial Marines characters for the player to choose from and each has different skills and attributes. If the player's current marine is defeated by an Alien creature, the player must replay the level with another marine and has a time limit to rescue the previous one.

The player can use most of the weapons that were introduced in the films, including pulse rifles, flamethrowers, and grenade launchers. Some marines can use a motion tracker to detect enemies, while others can use two-handed weapons. The game offers three firing modes: the first one allows the player to shoot in the direction the marine moves, the second one allows the player to shoot enemies while moving backwards, and the third one allows the player to shoot in any direction from a fixed position.

== Development and release ==
Thanatos Encounter was developed by the Australian company Wicked Witch Software after the British company Crawfish Interactive offered them an opportunity to create a game based on the Alien license. Because the developers were fans of the Alien films, they decided to include all the weapons that appeared in the films regardless of the extra development costs. The game's size is 8 Megabits. It was published by THQ and released for the Game Boy Color handheld game console on March 21, 2001.

== Reception ==
Reception

Review scores
Publication	Score
Consoles +	60%
Jeuxvideo.com	14/20
N64 Magazine	2/5
Nintendo Power	2.5/5
Pocket Magazine	4/5

Thanatos Encounter received mixed reviews from English and French publications. Nintendo Power noted that rescuing marines under a time limit intensifies the gameplay, but remarked that the top-down perspective ruins the suspense. Pocket Magazine felt that the game's graphics, while sharp, lack colourful details and said that the music does not offer tension. However, the magazine highlighted the enjoyable gameplay and the fact that enemies have different behaviours. In contrast, N64 Magazine criticized their artificial intelligence, saying that "the aliens just scamper about, bumping into walls", and explained that their unpredictable behavior, combined with their fast movement speed, makes the game highly frustrating. Consoles + did not recommend the game and criticized its slow gameplay, while Jeuxvideo.com praised the originality of the game's three firing modes, stating that they make the gameplay not repetitive.
