= Chris Lee (producer) =

Film producer

- Born: c. 1956 (age 69–70)
- Occupation: Film producer
- Notable work: Jerry Maguire, As Good As It Gets, Philadelphia, Valkyrie, Superman Returns
- Awards: Visionary Award (1999)

Chris Lee (born c. 1956) is a film producer who was formerly the head of Columbia/TriStar. During his tenure, he oversaw films such as Jerry Maguire, As Good As It Gets and Philadelphia. After leaving Columbia, he has produced films such as Valkyrie and Superman Returns. He was awarded the Visionary Award by East West Players in 1999 for his contributions to the Asian Pacific American community.

Lee is the founder of the University of Hawaii's Academy for Creative Media.

== Filmography ==
- Dim Sum: A Little Bit of Heart (1985) (assistant director/assistant editor)
- Blood of the Samurai (2001) (very special thanks)
- Final Fantasy: The Spirits Within (2001) (producer)
- Ballistic: Ecks vs. Sever (2002) (producer)
- S.W.A.T. (2003) (producer)
- Superman Returns (2006) (executive producer/assistant visual effects production coordinator)
- One Foot Off the Ground (2006) (executive producer)
- Real Fiction (2008) (executive producer)
- Valkyrie (2008) (executive producer)
- The People I've Slept With (2009) (special thanks)
