= Xtreme Wheels =

2001 video game

- Cover art
- Developer: Spike
- Publisher: BAM! Entertainment
- Platform: Game Boy Color
- Release: NA: April 17, 2001
- Genres: Sports, racing
- Mode: Single-player

Xtreme Wheels is a 2001 racing game developed by Spike and published by BAM! Entertainment for the Game Boy Color. Compared to Excitebike, the game is a BMX racing game in which the player competes with other riders to finish a motocross course.

== Gameplay ==
A screenshot of Xtreme Wheels, depicting the motocross style course.

Players complete races in Xtreme Wheels navigating motocross courses whilst maintaining speed, balance and stamina. In total, there are 20 courses, featuring hills, ramps and varied terrain. Courses contain jumps, requiring the player to balance using the control pad. Players also have a limited amount of stamina affecting their speed, requiring them to monitor their Stamina Meter to keep a consistent speed. Once the Stamina Meter runs out, the player stops until the meter recharges. Players also can select riders and teams that are unlockable as they progress in the game, with unlocked riders having higher levels of speed, balance and stamina.

Xtreme Wheels features several game modes. The main mode, Grand Prix, is a series of races against several computer opponents where the top six finishers on each course earn points to determine their overall ranking. Grand Prix features four 'licenses' or difficulty levels: Novice, Junior, International, and Super, each offering more challenging competition. Training Mode allows the player to learn the basics of the game. Time Attack allows players to practice on unlocked courses against a timer.

== Reception ==
Reception

Review scores
| Publication | Score |
|---|---|
| AllGame | 1.5/5 |
| Computer and Video Games | 2/5 |
| Game Boy Xtreme | 85% |
| Game Boy Official Magazine | 85% |
| 64 Magazine | 65% |

Xtreme Wheels received mixed reviews from critics. Many reviews focused on whether the inclusion of the Stamina Meter added or detracted from its pace and difficulty. Computer and Video Games found the game to be "fiddly and unforgiving", critiquing the "distracting" need to "keep an eye on the stamina gauge". Game Boy Official Magazine noted the game was "tough to get to grips with at the start, but...the game's a fun, challenging racer under the surface". 64 Magazine similarly found several issues with gameplay, noting the inconvenience of the "very annoying" stamina meter, the requirement to "time jumps quite accurately", and "additional problems of dire sound and the same gameplay flaws on every track".
