= My Disney Kitchen =

1998 video game

- North American PlayStation cover art
- Developer: Disney Interactive
- Publishers: Disney Interactive: JP: Atlus (PS); NA: BAM! Entertainment (PS)
- Platforms: Windows; Classic MacOS; PlayStation
- Release: Windows: NA: 1998; PlayStation: JP: February 7, 2002; NA: November 2002
- Genre: Edutainment
- Mode: Single-player

My Disney Kitchen is a 1998 edutainment video game from Disney Interactive.

== Gameplay ==
My Disney Kitchen is an edutainment video game with a point and click interface in which the player interacts with a fully stocked virtual kitchen. The player can prepare breakfast, lunch, or dinner for Mickey and Minnie by selecting ingredients and using appliances such as the oven, stove, blender, and popcorn maker. Food can be cooked, mixed, baked, fried, or blended, and items can burn if left unattended. The kitchen includes stations for making breakfast foods and assembling cakes, and the player can print real recipes that appear in the game. The environment is interactive: the player can open cabinets, choose ingredients, and operate appliances to assemble meals. The kitchen itself can be customized by changing the wallpaper, tablecloth, and other decorations. Throughout play, Mickey and Minnie appear as the recipients of the meals the player prepares, and the game's structure allows children to explore the kitchen freely while experimenting with different cooking actions.

== Release ==
A PlayStation port of the game, entitled Mickey and Minnie's Magical Kitchen (Note: Japanese: ミッキー&ミニーのマジカルキッチン, Hepburn: Mikkī & minī no majikarukitchin) was released by Atlus on February 7, 2002, in Japan. Released as part of the "Kids Station" lineup, the game included a special Mickey Mouse-themed Mouse and Mousepad, and was playable in both Japanese and English. The game was intended to teach children to speak basic English language words. In November 2002, BAM! Entertainment released the PlayStation version in North America. It was released as part of a three game publishing deal with Disney Interactive.

== Reception ==
Reception

Review scores
Publication	Score
Courier-Post	2/4
FamilyPC	85%
MacHome Journal	3.5/5
The Houston Chronicle	A

Kids Domain praised the recipes but criticised the technical problems.
