= Escape from Bug Island =

2006 video game

- European box art
- Developer: Spike
- Publishers: JP: Spike; WW: Eidos Interactive
- Platform: Wii
- Release: JP: December 2, 2006; NA: July 24, 2007; EU: October 26, 2007; AU: November 1, 2007
- Genres: Adventure, survival horror
- Mode: Single-player

Escape from Bug Island, titled Necro-Nesia (ネクロネシア, Nekuroneshia) in Japan, is a 2006 survival horror video game developed by Spike and released for the Wii. It was later published in North America by Eidos Interactive on July 24, 2007.

The narrative follows Ray, who must search for his friends on an island while fighting giant insects.

The game received generally negative reviews, with criticism focusing on its controls, combat system and graphics.

== Gameplay ==
The game uses third-person perspective, similarly to Resident Evil 4.

The protagonist, Ray, can be controlled with the Nunchuk's analog stick. He can only move forwards, and has to be rotated first in order to change direction. Ray is also able to use a flashlight and interact with objects spread across the game. There are frequent battles with giant insects, such as mantises and crickets. However, other kinds of creatures such as lizard-women and flying fish are also present.

The levels are mostly linear, and a minimap tells the player where their next destination is located. Along the way, the player is tasked with finding items (such as keys), opening doors and fighting bugs. If Ray gets hurt, he can restore health by using items such as mushrooms and fruit.

During a fight, there are generally two options to take: melee and long range. During a melee attack, such as swinging a wooden stick, the protagonist becomes incapable of moving. Meanwhile, after making the game enter a first-person view, the player can make Ray throw objects, such as rocks and grenades. Both methods involve swinging the Wii Remote.

Escape from Bug Island also includes certain minigames, such as shaking the controls to get rid of bugs. Moreover, at some moments Ray will cross a narrow log and the player has to maintain their balance by twisting the remote to keep an arrow in the center of a balance meter.

In the second half of the game, Ray is taken back to the beginning and the player has to revisit the earlier levels. There are newly accessible areas to be explored, such as previously blocked caves, where the player can find hidden bonuses. At some point during gameplay, items such as a new flashlight and weapons like a firearm can be obtained.

== Plot ==
The story starts when Ray, Mike and Michelle arrive at the mysterious Bug Island, a place with large insects, for a camping trip. The protagonist, Ray, plans to confess his love for the bug expert Michelle. However, before he gets a chance to, his friend Mike intervenes and flirts with her instead. As a result, Michelle runs off and Mike follows her, leaving Ray alone.

Since his friends won't return, Ray starts exploring the island by himself and searching for them.

Eventually, he goes inside a cabin and meets Lynn and Harry. Harry gets killed by a giant gorilla.

Later, the main character meets Mike hanging from the side of a bridge. A boss fight against a giant spider commences. Both the spider and Mike die.

At some point, Ray hears Michelle scream. In the temple area, he meets the same giant gorilla who killed Harry. Following the battle, a statue falls on the gorilla's head and kills it.

In the Cave of Time, the protagonist finds Michelle hiding, trying to avoid getting bitten by a swarm of insects. After Ray saves her, they continue through the cave and find a creature with tentacles. Ray returns to the beginning and has the opportunity to prevent some of the characters' demises.

The final battle is against a former human named Robert who is mutated into an insect-human hybrid. After his defeat, Ray is able to jump onto a boat and pursue a helicopter, ending the game. The player's choice determines if he leaves by himself or not.

== Development ==
In a 2006 interview, the game's director Nobuyasu Motoki explained the team intended to make a distinct horror experience, in a context where enemies in horror games were often zombies or humans. He described being inspired by the 2005 movie King Kong, specifically the scene featuring giant insects. According to Motoki, development began in early 2006. The choice of Wii as its platform was mainly due to the project's planning coinciding with the Wii's announcement, as well as enthusiasm for working with new hardware.

The game director reported difficulty with balancing the size of the movement the player should make with the controllers, considering how tiring it could become. He wanted to match the player's gesture to the character animation, which was also challenging.

A report from April 2007 stated that Eidos Interactive planned to adjust the game's controls, interface and difficulty for the American release. In a similar fashion, Nintendo Power reported that same month that unfavorable reviews of Necro-Nesia prompted Eidos to refine several aspects of the game during localization, including control tweaks and end-of-level wrap-ups.

The game was released in the United States on July 24, 2007, under the title Escape from Bug Island.

== Reception ==
Reception

Aggregate score
Aggregator	Score
Metacritic	37/100

Review scores
Publication	Score
1Up.com	F
Destructoid	3.5/10
Electronic Gaming Monthly	2.67/10
Famitsu	28/40
GameSpot	3.5/10
GameZone	4.1/10
IGN	4/10
Jeuxvideo.com	5/20
NGamer	48%
Nintendo Power	3.5/10
Nintendo World Report	4/10

The game received "generally unfavorable" reviews according to the review aggregation website Metacritic.

At E3 2006, critical impressions of Escape from Bug Island (then Necro-Nesia) were mostly negative, pointing out how the clunky controls can ruin combat sequences. IGN called the demo “void of anything that may resemble fun”. They did acknowledge, however, that better animation, improved controls and a significant rework on the combat system could make the title "worth looking at". Meanwhile, GameSpot noted that if the developers found more inventive ways to integrate the controller’s motion-sensing features into the gameplay, it could be an important step in making the game interesting.

The full release of Escape from Bug Island received criticism from 1Up.com's Greg Ford, who called it "easily the Wii's worst showing yet". Japanese gaming magazine Famitsu gave it a score of 28 out of 40. Ryan Davis, from GameSpot, highlighted the poor graphics, repetitive soundtrack and bad controls. He also mentioned the player can avoid enemy encounters completely by running past them. Jeuxvideo.com was underwhelmed by the game's atmosphere, calling it "sometimes not oppressive enough". They criticized the dated animations, awkward controls and weak soundtrack.

=== Sales ===
The game sold 1,934 units during the Wii’s first two days on sale in Japan, from December 2 to December 3, 2006.

== See also ==
- List of Wii games
