= Ballistic: Ecks vs. Sever =

2002 film by Wych Kaosayananda

- Theatrical release poster
- Directed by: Wych Kaosayananda (Note: Credited under the pseudonym Kaos.)
- Written by: Alan B. McElroy (Note: Peter M. Lenkov headed uncredited rewrites for the script.)
- Produced by: Chris Lee; Elie Samaha; Wych Kaosayananda
- Starring: Antonio Banderas; Lucy Liu; Gregg Henry; Ray Park; Talisa Soto
- Cinematography: Julio Macat
- Edited by: Jay Cassidy; Caroline Ross
- Music by: Don Davis
- Production company: Franchise Pictures
- Distributed by: Warner Bros. Pictures (United States and Canada); UFA (Germany)
- Release dates: September 18, 2002 (premiere); September 20, 2002 (US)
- Running time: 91 minutes
- Countries: United States; Germany; Canada
- Language: English
- Budget: $35 million
- Box office: $20.2 million

Ballistic: Ecks vs. Sever is a 2002 action thriller film directed and co-produced by Wych Kaosayananda from a screenplay by Alan B. McElroy. The film stars Antonio Banderas and Lucy Liu as opposing secret agents who team up to fight a common enemy. It was an international co-production with the United States, Canada, and Germany.

Ballistic: Ecks vs. Sever was overwhelmingly panned by critics, and is widely considered to be one of the worst films ever made. The film is the lowest rated film on Rotten Tomatoes, holding a rare 0% rating with 116 reviews, more than any of the other films with a 0% rating. It was also a box-office bomb, grossing $20.2 million on a production budget of $35 million.

== Plot ==
Returning home with his mother Vinn from a trip to Berlin, Michael Gant, the son of Defense Intelligence Agency (DIA) director Robert Gant, is kidnapped and his security detail is nearly wiped out by the attacker, ex-DIA (Note: The official synopsis incorrectly says NSA. Sever is an NSA agent in the first video game but a DIA agent in the movie. Discussing the DIA in the movie's press notes, Kaos says, "I have no idea what they actually do.") agent Sever. FBI agent Jeremiah Ecks left the agency after his wife Rayne was killed in a car bombing. His old boss, Julio Martin, asks him to investigate the Gant case. He claims that Vinn is still alive and he will give Ecks the information on her whereabouts if he helps take down Sever. Ecks agrees and discovers Sever is an orphaned Chinese girl the DIA adopted to train as a covert operative and assassin with "no fear, no conscience, and no morality." Meanwhile, Robert Gant executes the only survivor of his son's security detail. He then orders his elite agents, led by A. J. Ross, to pursue Sever and rescue Michael.

Ecks joins Martin and RCMP agent Harry Lee in Vancouver, where Sever is hiding out. Ecks learns that Gant stole an experimental weapon codenamed Softkill, a nanorobot which operates in the human circulatory system and can cause heart attacks at will. Gant had implanted Softkill in Michael in order to smuggle it into the United States. Ross and his men surround Sever in a shopping plaza, but she wipes out Ross's forces in a lengthy gun battle. Sever shoots Martin, and Ecks pursues Sever, climaxing with a fight that's cut off when Ross starts shooting at them with an M60 machine gun, giving Sever a chance to escape.

Ecks is arrested by the Vancouver Police Department under the pretense that he shot Martin. While being transported to jail, his convoy is attacked by Sever, who frees Ecks. After a lengthy car chase, Sever throws a piece of paper at Ecks and tells him to ask Gant about his wife. Ecks meets Rayne at an aquarium and it's revealed that her "death" was orchestrated by Gant. Rayne ended up believing Ecks had died while he believed that she had. Rayne then married Gant under the name Vinn. It ends up that Gant had Sever's family killed; it was initially believed that kidnapping Michael was Sever's revenge. However, Rayne reveals that Michael is actually Ecks' son, and Sever's kidnapping was for his protection.

Ecks, Rayne, and Sever go to Sever's underground bunker in an abandoned trainyard, where Rayne is reunited with Michael. Gant and Ross arrive with an army of heavily armed DIA agents, and a pitched battle ensues. Ecks and Sever eventually gain the upper hand and Sever kills Ross in a fight in the bunker. Gant tries to retrieve the Softkill in Michael's arm but is surprised to find it's not there. Sever kills Gant using a Softkill-loaded bullet and escapes as the police arrive. The film concludes with Ecks and Sever looking over the sea and Ecks thanking Sever for reuniting him with his family.

== Cast ==
- Antonio Banderas as Jeremiah Ecks
- Lucy Liu as Sever
- Gregg Henry as Robert Gant
- Ray Park as A.J. Ross
- Talisa Soto as Rayne Ecks / Vinn Gant
- Miguel Sandoval as FBI Special Agent-in-Charge Julio Martin
- Terry Chen as RCMP Agent Harry Lee
- Roger R. Cross as DIA Agent Zane
- Eric Breker as DIA Agent Curtis
- Sandrine Holt as FBI Agent Bennett
- Steve Bacic as FBI Agent Fleming
- Tony Alcantar as Edgar Moore
- Aidan Drummond as Michael Gant
- Charles Andre as FBI Agent Addis
- Mike Dopud as DIA Agent
- Scott Leva as DIA Sniper

== Production ==
=== Development ===
In 1986, screenwriter Alan B. McElroy wrote a spec script titled Legion, about an ex L.A. cop who's called in to help track down a rogue CIA agent code-named Legion who went on a killing spree. After he and director Dwight H. Little made Halloween 4: The Return of Michael Myers (1988), the next movie they wanted to do was Legion, which by then was re-titled into Gunner, the name of the main hero character in the script. Between 1988 and 1989 they worked on the project at Vestron Pictures, and Dolph Lundgren was going to star in the film; however, due to management changes at Vestron, producer Charles W. Fries stopped development of the film. McElroy's script was left unproduced until about 1999 when it was picked up for production again, but this time with the new title, Ecks vs. Sever.

=== Writing ===
After the director and cast were finally chosen in pre-production, McElroy's script was completely re-written by Peter M. Lenkov. The main reasons for re-writes included excessively big and expensive action sequences, a wish for a more serious, darker, and grittier tone, and the story of McElroy's original script focusing more on themes of family love and loss and revenge. The entire subplot about nanotechnology was one of the things which were added to make the film more like The Matrix (1999). Sever was also changed from a male to a female character. Despite re-writing the entire script, Lenkov was not credited in the final film, and McElroy ended up getting only writing credit, despite very little similarity between his original script and Lenkov's re-write.

=== Casting ===
Originally the film was intended to star Wesley Snipes and Jet Li, and then after them Sylvester Stallone and Vin Diesel were going to star. Kaosayananda's preferred choices were Chow Yun-fat and Jean Reno, but producers didn't consider them financially viable.

On November 12, 1999, The Honolulu Advertiser announced Chris Lee and Franchise Pictures would produce Ballistic: Ecks vs. Sever, and that Kaos would direct the film. On July 26, 2001, Entertainment Weekly revealed Liu and Banderas were in discussions about starring in the film, as well as two descriptions of the film's premise: "two competing assassins who unite against a common foe" and "Bad Boys meets The Professional".

=== Filming ===
Principal photography was scheduled to begin in Bangkok on November 5, 2001. However, Lee changed the filming location to Hawaii, before ultimately settling on Vancouver, due to lower production costs and superior tax incentives. During the filming of Ballistic, Lee advocated in various ways for more government funding for Hawaii's film industry; for example, by appearing at the event Hawaii's Film Industry: Global Impact, Global Challenges, which was held at the Signature Dole Cannery Theatres on February 26, 2002.

All of the pyrotechnics shown in the movie were produced using real explosions rather than computer-generated graphics.

In a 2024 interview on the podcast One Filmmaker, One Film, Kaosayananda claimed that the actual production budget of the film was $35 million, half of the officially-reported $70 million. Producer Franchise Pictures was known to fraudulently inflate the budgets of their films, most notably Battlefield Earth, as found by a Los Angeles Superior Court in 2004.

=== Post-production ===
I'd shot an old school actioner in 2002 with the Steve McQueen classic Bullitt as my template. My DP and I had specific needs to be met with the way we shot it, especially when it came to all the action scenes I choreographed while working with Joel Kramer – one the best stunt coordinators in his field. But despite our best efforts, the movie was butchered to the point where certain shots were flipped because the edit no longer made sense. And yes, this also affected the sequencing and pacing of the action – it was horrible to watch.

— Wych Kaosayananda

During post-production, Kaosayananda was removed from creative control by the producers, who replaced his original editor (Caroline Ross) and denied him final cut privilege. Among the deleted scenes were different introductions for the main characters. A subplot involving Sandrine Holt's character was cut completely, rendering her character a nearly non-speaking part. Kaosayananda stated in a 2014 interview that the re-edits also affected the action scenes.

Producers also replaced Kaosayanada's first choice of composer, Trevor Rabin, with Don Davis, wanting a score reminiscent of his work on The Matrix.

== Soundtrack ==
The soundtrack includes these tracks:

1. "Main Title"
2. "The Name of the Game"
3. "Smartbomb" [Plump Dj's Remix]
4. "Heaven Scent" [Original Mix]
5. "The Flow"
6. "I Think of You" [Screamer Remix]
7. "Hell Above Water"
8. "Go"
9. "Bloodlock"
10. "I Need Love"
11. "The Aquarium"
12. "Time"
13. "Anytime"

== Release ==
Ballistic: Ecks vs. Sever was released September 20, 2002.

== Reception ==
=== Box office ===
In its opening weekend, Ballistic: Ecks vs. Sever grossed $7 million in 2,705 theaters for an average of $2,591 per theater, ranking number 4 at the U.S. box office. The film ultimately earned $14.3 million in the U.S. and $5.6 million internationally for a total of $19.9 million against a $35 million production budget.

=== Critical response ===
On the review aggregator website Rotten Tomatoes, 0% of 118 critics' reviews are positive, with an average rating of 2.8/10. The website's consensus reads: "A startlingly inept film, Ballistic: Ecks vs. Sever offers overblown, wall-to-wall action without a hint of wit, coherence, style, or originality." Among the films that hold, or have held, a 0% rating, Ballistic has the most reviews, being to date the only film with such a rating to have over 100 reviews. In March 2007, Rotten Tomatoes ranked the film number 1 on its "The Worst of the Worst" movie list, noting it as "the worst-reviewed movie in our site's history", and it remains there as of January 2026. Metacritic, which uses a weighted average, assigned the film a score of 19 out of 100, based on 26 critics, indicating "overwhelming dislike". Cinemascore gave the film a "B−" on A+ to F scale.

Roger Ebert gave the film half a star out of four, and later included it on the list of his most hated movies. He said of the film: "There is nothing wrong with the title Ballistic: Ecks vs. Sever that renaming it Ballistic would not have solved. Strange that they would choose such an ungainly title when, in fact, the movie is not about Ecks versus Sever but about Ecks and Sever working together against a common enemy – although Ecks, Sever and the audience take a long time to figure that out. [...] Ballistic: Ecks vs. Sever is an ungainly mess, submerged in mayhem, occasionally surfacing for clichés, overloaded with special effects and explosions, light on continuity, sanity and coherence."

Lucy Liu was nominated for the 2002 Stinkers Bad Movie Awards Worst Actress Award, but lost to Madonna for her performance in Swept Away.

Wych Kaosayananda stated he had never seen the finished film.

== Other media ==
=== Video games ===
A Game Boy Advance first-person shooter, Ecks vs. Sever, was released in 2001, ten months before the film premiered. Unlike the film, the game received very positive reviews, and a score of 9/10 on IGN. The game was considered an impressive technological feat on the Game Boy Advance. A sequel game, Ballistic: Ecks vs. Sever, was released six days before the film's premiere and is based on its final cut that was released to theaters.

== See also ==
- List of American films of 2002
- List of 21st century films considered the worst
- List of films with a 0% rating on Rotten Tomatoes
