= Jawa: Mammoth to Himitsu no Ishi =

2008 video game

- Cover art
- Developer: Spike
- Publisher: Spike
- Platform: Wii
- Release: JP: July 3, 2008
- Genre: Action adventure
- Mode: Single-player

Jawa: Mammoth to Himitsu no Ishi (JAWA〜マンモスとヒミツの石〜; lit. "Jawa: Mammoth and the Stone's Secret") is a video game for the Wii home game console. It was announced at a Nintendo event in Japan leading up to the Wii launch. It is set in the Stone Age and was released in Japan on July 3, 2008.
