= Transformers: Beast Wars Transmetals =

1999 video game

- North American Nintendo 64 box art
- Developers: Locomotive (N64); WAVEDGE (PS1)
- Publishers: JP: Takara; NA: Bay Area Multimedia
- Directors: Aaron Endo; Akimasa Konishi (N64); Akira Toba (N64); Katsuyuki Nishikawa (PS1)
- Producers: Tsuyoshi Igarashi; Shunichi Okusa
- Designer: Katsumi Kawagoe (PS1)
- Programmers: Tsutom Makamura (N64); Toshio Yakuwa (N64); Osamu Matsuki (PS1)
- Composers: Kazuhisa Kamifuji (N64); Katsuhiro Hayashi (PS1); Koichi Namiki (PS1)
- Series: Transformers
- Platforms: Nintendo 64, PlayStation
- Release: Nintendo 64: JP: October 2, 1999; NA: July 12, 2000; PlayStation: JP: December 9, 1999; NA: July 12, 2000
- Genre: Fighting
- Modes: Single player, multiplayer

Transformers: Beast Wars Transmetals is a 1999 3D fighting game for the Nintendo 64 and PlayStation, based on the Transformers: Beast Wars cartoon series and toy-line, It was published in Japan by Takara in 1999, and in North America by Bay Area Multimedia in 2000. Each version features different game mechanics and playable characters.

The Nintendo 64 version of the game, known as Transformers: Beast Wars Metals 64 (Note: Toransufōmā Bīsutou~ōzu Metarusu 64 (Japanese: トランスフォーマー ビーストウォーズメタルス64)) in Japan, was developed by Locomotive Corporation. It contains arcade mode endings for all characters and several mini-games. In North America, this version was a Blockbuster Video exclusive that was initially only available for rental.

The PlayStation version of the game, known as Transformers Beast Wars Metals: Gekitotsu! Gangan Battle (Note: Toransufōmā Bīsutou~ōzu Metarusu: Gekitotsu! Gangan Batoru (Japanese: トランスフォーマー ビーストウォーズメタルス 激突!ガンガンバトル; Transformers Beast Wars Metals: Clash! Intense Battle)) in Japan, was developed by WAVEDGE. It features alternate story campaigns for the Maximal and Predacon factions.

== Gameplay ==
In both games, players take control of one of the Maximals or Predacons in a 1-on-1 battle and attempt to deplete their opponent's life through the use of projectile and melee attacks. Each character can change between three different modes: a Beast Mode, a Vehicle Mode, and a Robot Mode. Players can battle against CPU opponents in each game's single player mode, or against a second player in versus mode.

In the Nintendo 64 version, gameplay takes place in a flat 3D arena. Each of the three character modes has different strengths and weaknesses: Robot Mode is the strongest, but usage depletes an "energon resistance gauge" that will prevent the character from attacking when fully depleted. Beast Mode recharges the gauge and has high defense, but its attacks are less effective. Vehicle Mode has higher mobility and does not charge or drain the gauge, but has low defense and uses projectile attacks that are easily avoided. The game features a single-player arcade mode, with unique text-based endings for each character. A versus mode, team battle mode and several mini-games are also available for play. The Japanese version is compatible with the Transfer Pak accessory; connecting different Game Boy games will positively or negatively affect the player character's maximum health and energon resistance gauge consumption rate.

The PlayStation version features a top-down viewpoint. Characters move around 3D battlefields, each of which features various interactable objects and environmental hazards that can deal additional damage to the combatants. Dealing and receiving damage will also build up each character's super meter, allowing them to use powerful super attacks. The game features a single player story mode, in which each faction attempts to move across a map to reach the opposing faction's base, participating in battles along the way. Story mode is split between Maximal and Predacon campaigns, and features FMV cutscenes. The game also includes versus, survival and training modes, while various images and videos can be unlocked in an in-game gallery.

=== Playable characters ===
The original Japanese releases each feature eight playable characters, including three characters exclusive to each version. This was expanded to 12 each for the North American releases through the addition of four secret characters, all of which are palette-swapped versions of existing characters given unique voice lines. The Nintendo 64 version features an original character, Megatron X, who appears as a secret boss in the arcade mode. In the Japanese release, Megatron X can be unlocked as a playable character by connecting to Kettō Transformers Beast Wars: Beast Senshi Saikyō Ketteisen via the Transfer Pak. In addition to the playable cast, the Maximal Rhinox appears as a non-player character in the PlayStation version's story mode.

- Airazor (Note: Exclusive to the Nintendo 64 version)
- Blackarachnia (Note: Secret character added to the North American release)
- Cheetor
- Megatron
- Megatron X (Note: Boss character in all releases; secret playable character in the Japanese release)
- Optimus Primal
- Quickstrike (Note: Exclusive to the PlayStation version)
- Rampage
- Rattrap
- Ravage
- Silverbolt
- Starscream
- Tarantulas
- Terrorsaur
- Tigatron
- Waspinator
- Windrazor

== Plot ==
Transformers: Beast Wars Transmetals is set in an alternate version of the second season of the animated series, following the introduction of the Transmetals and Fuzors. While being transported back to the planet Cybertron after his defeat, as depicted in the final episode of Beast Wars, Megatron sends a message through time to his past self, warning him of his own defeat. This action creates a divergent timeline in which several Maximals and Predacons gain new Transmetal forms and resume their battles on prehistoric Earth.

The Nintendo 64 version features unique story endings for each character, detailing their actions after defeating the opposing faction leader. The PlayStation version features two story campaigns: the Maximal campaign, in which Optimus Primal leads a team to infiltrate the Predacon ship and retrieve the stolen Golden Disk; and the Predacon campaign, in which Megatron and his henchmen lure the Maximals out of their ship in an attempt to finish them.

== Reception ==
Reception

Aggregate score
Aggregator	Score	
Aggregator	N64	PS
GameRankings	48.67%	N/A

Review scores
Publication	Score	
Publication	N64	PS
Famitsu	23/40	23/40
GameFan	55%	N/A
IGN	3/10	3/10
Nintendo Power	6.1/10	N/A
Official U.S. PlayStation Magazine	N/A	1/5
Play	N/A	10%

The game was met with negative reception upon release, with the Nintendo 64 version receiving a score of 48.67% from review aggregator GameRankings. IGN's Marc Nix described the Nintendo 64 release as a "botched" version of Virtual On, criticizing the balancing of play and giving their overall impression as "not awful." Nix's review of the PlayStation release rated both the close-range and projectile-based fighting as unsatisfactory: "It's not fun, and even the office's Beast Wars fans could hardly stand it."
