= Dragon Ball: Raging Blast =

2009 video game

- Developer: Spike
- Publisher: Bandai Namco Games (Note: Released under the Bandai brand name outside North America.)
- Director: Hiroyuki Kaneko
- Composers: Shunsuke Kikuchi; Toshiyuki Kishi
- Series: Dragon Ball
- Platforms: PlayStation 3, Xbox 360
- Release: NA: November 10, 2009; JP: November 12, 2009; EU: November 13, 2009; AU: November 19, 2009
- Genre: Fighting
- Modes: Single-player, multiplayer

Dragon Ball: Raging BlastDragon Ball: Raging Blast (Note: Japanese: ドラゴンボール レイジングブラスト, Hepburn: Doragon Bōru Reijingu Burasuto) is a video game based on the manga and anime franchise Dragon Ball. It was developed by Spike and published by Namco Bandai for the PlayStation 3 and Xbox 360 game consoles in North America; internationally it was published under the Bandai label. It was released in Japan, North America, Europe, and Australia during the second week of November 2009. In Europe, a limited edition pack of the game was also released that included bonus collector material.

The game is a cel-shaded 3D fighter that allows players to play as characters within the Dragon Ball universe, either against the game's AI or another player in one of the various modes of play both on and offline. The game is one of the first games in the Dragon Ball franchise to be published by Namco Bandai in North America, as the company would acquire the gaming license from previous license holder Atari in July of that same year.

The game was met with mixed reviews from gaming critics for its story mode and overall gameplay controls.

== Gameplay ==
A screenshot of the gameplay, showing Vegeta (Scouter) fighting Goku in a rocky land. The border around the each character's profile portrait are the health and ki meters. The green bars are health and the yellow bars are ki.

The game featured mode called Dragon Battle Collection allows players to play through the original events of the Dragon Ball story, but their actions in battle can change the story in many different ways. Over 100 "Battle Frames" can be selected at any time, regardless of chronological order to which they appear in the series. The story spans from the Saiyan Saga up until the Kid Buu Saga. Battle Frames also include "what-if" scenarios that never occurred in the series. Players can practice and hone their skills in the "Dojo". Players can also partake in the "Super Battle Trial" single-player modes. The online mode features a 16-player "Budokai Tournament", single or team battle VS, and a spectator mode where players can rate the fighters.

New combination moves can now be utilized, allowing two characters to launch special attacks. There are also brand new environmental features such as new advanced interactions with the grounds of the battlefield. Enhanced destructible features such as rocks, mountains, and even the ground below are now destructible. The ground can now split, shatter, or just be obliterated. Players can now also throw enemies into rocks or other environment features, causing the opponent to become trapped, defenseless, and unable to move. The capsule system from previous games also returned, allowing players to customize their characters.

== Development ==
The game was first mentioned in Namco Bandai's 2009 fiscal report. It was revealed that a new game was in development for both Xbox 360 and PS3, and that the game will be released the second quarter of the 2009–2010 fiscal year. A full announcement was featured May 2009 issue of V Jump magazine. The issue included several screenshots showing that the game contained gameplay elements from the previous Sparking games, polished Sparking character models, and revealed the official title. A week later, Namco Bandai's European branch released a statement announcing that they would release the game throughout Europe sometime in autumn of that year.

On June 2 the Namco Bandai's US branch issued a press release stating that they would release the game throughout North America and that they would retain the game's title. It would also mention that the game would feature new interactive and destructible environments, more than seventy characters including transformations, a new special attack system called "Super Rising", and that the release date would be sometime in the Fall of 2009.

Raging Blast marks the debut of Super Saiyan 3 Broly and Super Saiyan 3 Vegeta, characters who previously never had access to the transformation.

The following July, Namco Bandai announced in a press release that they had successfully acquired the North American Dragon Ball gaming license from Atari, giving them the right to publish Dragon Ball games for the next five years, starting with the titles Raging Blast, Revenge of King Piccolo, and Attack of the Saiyans. In an article of the July thirteenth issue of Weekly Shonen Jump magazine it was revealed that the game would receive a new theme song. In August both V Jump and Shonen Jump would feature articles which revealed that Broly would receive an exclusive Super Saiyan 3 form within the game. In September Namco Bandai revealed that Raging Blast, along with eighteen other titles, would be available for hands-on demonstration at the 2009 Tokyo Game Show. A few days later Shonen Jump would feature another spread showing several in-game screenshots, including battle over some of the battle fields such as the city and Namek stages, the character select menu, and the VS match up screen. The spread would also reveal the game's official boxart for the Japanese release. In the October 5 issue of Shonen Jump it was revealed that Vegeta would also receive an exclusive Super Saiyan 3 form. Two days later, it was announced that there would be a Limited Edition version released throughout Europe. This would include a fifty-two page artbook, the game's soundtrack, and coupons to redeem for special unlockables on the PlayStation Network and Xbox Live Marketplace. The game itself would come in a Steelbook case.

On October 23, Namco Bandai announced that they had completed Raging Blast and that it would be shipped on November 10 throughout North America. The game was also released in Japan on November 12, Europe on November 13, and in Australia on November 19. A few days later, the company announced that they had released a demo of the game for both PlayStation Network and Xbox Live Marketplace for North American users and that a Raging Blast Special Pack would be available to North American players who pre-ordered the game.

== Characters ==
Name	Playable Transformations	Available at Start
Android #16		No
Android #17		No
Android #18		No
Android #19		Yes
Android #20		Yes
Bardock		No
Broly	Base; Super Saiyan; Legendary Super Saiyan	No
Broly (Super Saiyan 3)		No
Burter		no
Captain Ginyu		Yes
Cell	Imperfect Form; Semi-perfect Form; Perfect Form; Super Perfect Form	Yes
Chiaotzu		Yes
Dodoria		Yes
Frieza	First form; Second form; Third form; Final form; 100% final form	Yes
Gogeta	Super Saiyan	No
Gohan	Base; Super Saiyan; Super Saiyan 2	Yes
Goku	Base; Super Saiyan; Super Saiyan 2; Super Saiyan 3	Yes
Goten	Base; Super Saiyan	No
Gotenks	Base; Super Saiyan; Super Saiyan 3	No
Guldo		No
Jeice		No
Kid Buu		No
Kid Gohan		Yes
Kid Trunks	Base; Super Saiyan	No
Krillin		Yes
Majin Buu		Yes
Nappa		Yes
Piccolo		Yes
Raditz		Yes
Recoome		No
Super Buu	Base; Gotenks absorbed; Gohan absorbed	Yes
Teen Gohan	Base; Super Saiyan; Super Saiyan 2	Yes
Tien		Yes
Trunks (Sword)	Base; Super Saiyan	No
Trunks	Base; Super Saiyan; Super Trunks	Yes
Vegeta	Base; Super Saiyan; Super Vegeta; Super Saiyan 2	Yes
Majin Vegeta		No
Vegeta (Scouter)		No
Vegeta (Super Saiyan 3)		No
Vegito	Base; Super Saiyan	No
Videl		No
Yamcha		Yes
Zarbon	Base; Monster	Yes

== Reception ==
Reception

Aggregate scores
Aggregator	Score
GameRankings	(PS3): 60.37% (X360): 57.86%
Metacritic	(PS3): 57/100 (X360): 56/100

Review scores
Publication	Score
Famitsu	33/40
GameRevolution	(PS3): 0.5/5
GameSpot	(X360): 6/10
GamesRadar+	2/5
IGN	6.2/10
3DJuegos	(PS3): 6/10
Vandal	6.6/10

Dragon Ball: Raging Blast was released in North America on November 10, 2009, in Japan on November 12, 2009, in Europe on November 13, 2009, and in Australia on November 19, 2009. In its first week the PlayStation 3 version managed to sell 58,000 copies in Japan, making it the third best selling game behind the revamped Pokémon HeartGold and SoulSilver.

Along with its sales, the game received mixed reviews from various gaming critics. Both the PS3 and Xbox 360 versions earned their own aggregated scores of 57/100 and 56/100 on Metacritic, 60.37% and 57.86% on GameRankings respectively. Chris Roper of IGN found the Super Battle Trial to be the most interesting part of the game, though he would complain about the presentation of the story arcs in the Dragon Battle Collection mode, the gaming mechanics, and the camera. Gambus Kahn of ZTGameDomain, who reviewed the PlayStation 3 version, had mixed feelings over the fighting system, claiming that it was both awesome and a pain, as most of the controls are utilized during play and the right analog stick was used as another set of buttons functions, making it appear convoluted. Khan went on to complain about the timing accuracy in which a player has to block both grabbing and Ki attacks, which he compares as being tougher than the timing accuracy in Street Fighter IV. Although he loved the game's depth, claiming that it "plays unlike any non-Dragon Ball game before", he stated that it had the feel of a very fast-paced Armored Core game. Arnold Katayev of PSXtream felt that the game mechanics were not very deep. He called the multiplayer mode the best thing about the game, while complaining that the dialogue was not taken straight from the anime.

Downtown Jimmy of Extreme Gamer complained that the controls were too simple and criticized the camera for not having a lock on feature. While he felt that the graphics were not impressive, they still looked good enough to surpass his expectations of what the game looked like. Carolyn Petit of GameSpot found that the visuals captured the look of the anime very well. She stated that the controls were complex but featured little depth. She mentioned that attacks made the battle within the game feel "tremendous", but stated the Ki building process would take attention away from the combat due to being time-consuming and leaving the player wide open to an attack. She also had complaints over the multiplayer, claiming that as the screen became split down the middle on offline multiplayer, it would limit the player's view and that online multiplayer was better but would be riddled with opponents that would instantly log off if things don't go their way. Jeremy Jastrzab of PALGN pointed out that the game was good by itself, but was not as good as any of the previous games, stating that "there is no excuse for it being worse than its predecessors."

Robert Workman of GameDaily felt that while the game has good visuals and options, its problems were a sign that the license is getting old, stating that Namco Bandai should get back to basics or retire the franchise. David Chapman of TeamXbox praised the character models for looking like "dead ringers" to their anime counterparts and stated that the 360's online play was nearly flawless with little to no lag, yet he felt that gameplay needed a third hand for controls. GameTrailers stated that the difference in the game's overall feel was a good thing, yet the camera problems would turn away casual gamers. Gamezone's "jkdmedia" called the Dragon Mode impressive and said that he likes the game's Ultimate Customize feature, as it lets players customize their favorite characters with various attacks and items, but commented that the feature was useless due to the game's drawbacks.
