= Star X =

2002 video game

- North American box art
- Developer: Graphic State
- Publisher: BAM! Entertainment
- Platform: Game Boy Advance
- Release: NA: April 15, 2002; PAL: May 17, 2002
- Genre: Rail shooter
- Modes: Single-player, multiplayer

Star X is a rail shooter video game developed by Graphic State and published by BAM! Entertainment for the Game Boy Advance handheld video game console. It was first released in North America on April 15, 2002, and later was released in the PAL regions on May 17, 2002.

== Gameplay ==
Star X is a rail shooter video game with gameplay and graphics similar to that of Star Fox.

== Development ==
Star X was developed by Graphic State and published by BAM! Entertainment. The game was first announced in 2001 under the name Star Fight. Graphic State's creative director Richard Whittall cited 1993's Star Fox as an influence to the development of the game, while mentioning the gameplay to be different from the Super Nintendo Entertainment System game.

== Reception ==
Reception

Aggregate score
Aggregator	Score
Metacritic	60/100

Review scores
Publication	Score
Computer and Video Games	6/10
Game Informer	6.75/10
GamePro	3/5
GamesMaster	61%
GameSpot	6.8/10
GameZone	8.9/10
IGN	4.5/10
Nintendo Power	3.3/5

Star X received "mixed" reviews according to the review aggregation website Metacritic. Craig Harris of IGN called it "terrible" and "frustrating".

Play Magazine called it the best Shooter for the Game Boy Advance, calling it one of the best GBA games of 2002 and the best polygonal handheld game ever.
