= Driven (video game) =

2001 video game

- PAL region PS2 cover art
- Developers: BAM! Studios Europe; Crawfish Interactive (Game Boy Advance)
- Publisher: BAM! Entertainment
- Platforms: GameCube, PlayStation 2, Game Boy Advance
- Release: PS2, Game Boy Advance: NA: November 7, 2001 (PS2); NA: December 11, 2001 (GBA); PAL: December 14, 2001; GameCube: NA: March 26, 2002; EU: May 3, 2002; AU: May 17, 2002
- Genre: Racing
- Modes: Single-player, multiplayer

Driven is a racing game developed by BAM! Studios Europe and published by BAM! Entertainment for PlayStation 2 and GameCube. A Game Boy Advance version developed by Crawfish Interactive was also made. The games are based on the 2001 film of the same name.

== Development ==
The game was the first internally-developed title released by BAM!, and was the publisher's first PlayStation 2 and GameCube title.

== Reception ==
Reception

Aggregate score
| Aggregator | Score | | |
| Aggregator | GBA | GameCube | PS2 |
|---|---|---|---|
| Metacritic | 68/100 | 55/100 | 38/100 |

Review scores
| Publication | Score | | |
| Publication | GBA | GameCube | PS2 |
|---|---|---|---|
| AllGame | 2/5 | N/A | N/A |
| Edge | 7/10 | N/A | N/A |
| Electronic Gaming Monthly | N/A | 2.5/10 | N/A |
| Eurogamer | 7/10 | N/A | N/A |
| Game Informer | N/A | N/A | 6.5/10 |
| GamePro | N/A | 3.5/5 | N/A |
| GameSpot | 7.1/10 | 6.2/10 | 2.9/10 |
| GameSpy | 76% | N/A | N/A |
| GameZone | 6/10 | 7.5/10 | 8/10 |
| IGN | 6.5/10 | 3.6/10 | 2/10 |
| Nintendo Power | N/A | 2.7/5 | N/A |
| Official U.S. PlayStation Magazine | N/A | N/A | 1/5 |

The Game Boy Advance and GameCube versions received "mixed or average reviews", while the PlayStation 2 version received "unfavorable" reviews, according to the review aggregation website Metacritic.
