= Dropship: United Peace Force =

2002 video game

- Developer: SCEE Studio Camden
- Publishers: EU: Sony Computer Entertainment; NA: BAM! Entertainment
- Producer: Peter Edward
- Designer: Nick Ryan
- Programmers: Simon Hobbs; Tim Darby
- Artist: Joe Money
- Writer: James Leach
- Composer: Alastair Lindsay
- Platforms: PlayStation 2; PlayStation 4; PlayStation 5
- Release: EU: 18 January 2002; NA: 11 June 2002; 18 February 2025 (PS4 / PS5)
- Genre: Air combat simulation
- Mode: Single-player

Dropship: United Peace Force is a 2002 combat flight simulation video game developed by SCEE Studio Camden and published by Sony Computer Entertainment for the PlayStation 2. The player assumes the role of a pilot in the United Peace Force, a fictional multinational military organisation charged with combating terrorism and organized crime across the world. The game itself is set in 2050. Developer Studio Camden was a former division of Psygnosis, and was moved to Sony during development; it was the last game they developed before being merged into London Studio.

== Gameplay ==
The game features a number of futuristic aircraft, including agile fighters, and slower transport aircraft. The game also features levels in which the player drives military vehicles such as armored personnel carriers.

Unlike many science fiction flight simulator games, Dropship is set in the near future, and the vehicles and weapons, although futuristic, are grounded in reality, and bear many recognizable traits of modern military aircraft. The game has missions where the player must fly low not to be spotted, protect vulnerable craft and deliver/pick up valuable cargo. Another feature of the game is the VTOL ability of most of the game's aircraft, allowing the player to switch to a hover mode and land the aircraft manually.

== Reception ==
Reception

Aggregate score
Aggregator	Score
Metacritic	78/100

Review scores
Publication	Score
Edge	7/10
Electronic Gaming Monthly	6.17/10
EP Daily	8/10
Game Informer	7.5/10
GameSpot	7.9/10
GameSpy	3/5
IGN	7.9/10
Official U.S. PlayStation Magazine	4/5
PlayStation: The Official Magazine	7/10
X-Play	3/5
Maxim	4/5

The game received "generally favorable reviews" according to the review aggregation website Metacritic. Maxim gave it a favourable review, a few weeks before it was released Stateside. Four-Eyed Dragon of GamePro said, "Despite the fair controls, Dropship still performs with flying colors." (Note: GamePro gave the game two 4.5/5 scores for graphics and fun factor, 4/5 for sound, and 3.5/5 for control.)

Toonami, Cartoon Network's after-school action programming block at the time, reviewed the game in June 2002. In the review, TOM (Steven Blum) said the game "doesn't look too sharp, but it plays okay" and that the problem was he couldn't get beyond the sixth level; "it's driving [him] nuts." The score the game was given ended up being a ? out of 10, as TOM had not yet finished the game.
