= BAM! Entertainment =

American dormant video game publisher

BAM! Entertainment, Inc.
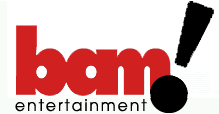
- Formerly: Bay Area Multimedia, Inc. (1999–2000)
- Type: Private
- Traded as: Nasdaq: BFUN
- Industry: Video games
- Founded: October 7, 1999; 26 years ago
- Founder: Ray Musci
- Defunct: May 2005
- Fate: Bankruptcy
- Headquarters: San Jose, California, US
- Key people: Ray Musci (CEO)

BAM! Entertainment, Inc. (formerly Bay Area Multimedia, Inc.) was an American video game publisher based in San Jose, California, that was founded by Ray Musci in October 1999. BAM!'s partnership with Cartoon Network in 2000 led to the development of a number of licensed video games featuring Cartoon Network IPs, including The Powerpuff Girls, Dexter's Laboratory, Samurai Jack, and Ed, Edd n Eddy.

A 2001 distribution deal allowed French publisher Ubi Soft to distribute BAM!'s games internationally. BAM! suffered financial turmoil beginning in 2002, during which time the NASDAQ threatened to delist it from the stock exchange. The company sold off its London-based development studio to VIS Entertainment in 2003. BAM! acquired VIS in 2004 but was delisted from the NASDAQ. The company continued to publish licensed games until 2005, when the company went defunct after filing for bankruptcy.

== History ==
=== Formation ===
American entrepreneur Ray Musci founded Bay Area Multimedia on October 7, 1999. The company signed a deal with Takara in April 2000 to localize and publish Transformers: Beast Wars Transmetals for the Nintendo 64 in North America as a rental-only release. The company also signed distribution deals with Virgin Interactive and Victor Interactive Software to distribute Jimmy White's 2: Cueball and Contender 2 for the North American market.

In 2000, Bay Area Multimedia secured an exclusive licensing deal with Warner Bros. Interactive Entertainment and Cartoon Network to publish games based on Dexter's Laboratory, The Powerpuff Girls, and Yogi Bear. The company also secured a licensing agreement with Franchise Pictures to publish video games based on its films. A separate licensing agreement with Warner Bros. and DC Comics was also made for the licensing of Sgt. Rock.

=== Expansion ===
In December 2000, the company was renamed BAM! Entertainment.

Shortly afterward, the company opened an office in the United Kingdom to publish their games in Europe. They soon signed a deal with Ubi Soft in February 2001 for the distribution of BAM!'s games in the entirety of Europe except for the United Kingdom. The company launched its first Palm OS titles, Strike it Rich and CardTopia, at the end of June 2001. From September onward the company secured more publishing and licensing deals, including a deal to publish the Game Boy Advance port of Broken Sword: The Shadow of the Templars on September 17 and a licensing agreement with Spyglass Entertainment for a video game based on Reign of Fire on October 9 and 16.

By February 2001 the company had a staff of 20 in its UK studio and 10 employees in San Jose, California.

On January 8, 2002, BAM! announced that its Cartoon Network partnership would expand to include Samurai Jack and later and Ed, Edd n Eddy. Shortly afterwards, BAM! signed a five-year agreement with Aardman Animations to publish games based on Wallace and Gromit. In February, the company announced a port of Driven as its first GameCube title, and at the end of the month signed a publishing agreement with Sony Computer Entertainment Europe to release World Rally Championship in North America. The SCEE agreement soon expanded to include Wipeout Fusion and Dropship: United Peace Force in March. In June, a deal was made with Riverdeep for video games based on the Carmen Sandiego educational franchise. In November, BAM! signed a publishing deal with Disney Interactive to release two Winnie the Pooh educational titles and My Disney Kitchen for the PlayStation.

=== Fate and bankruptcy ===
In 2002, BAM! started to suffer from financial problems, which led to the NASDAQ threatening to delist the company.

In April 2003, the company's London-based development studio was purchased by VIS Entertainment, however, VIS later announced that the studio would close following the completion of its remaining projects. In the same year, following the expiration of its distribution deal with Ubi Soft, BAM! entered into a new distribution deal with Acclaim Entertainment in August. Unlike the Ubi Soft partnership, the Acclaim deal included all PAL region countries. The deal ended after Acclaim's bankruptcy the following year.

In 2004, BAM! acquired VIS Entertainment and fellow subsidiary State of Emergency Development. The NASDAQ finally delisted BAM!'s stock in the same year. VIS Entertainment was placed into bankruptcy in April 2005; BAM! then sold the rights to VIS's State of Emergency 2 to DC Studios in May that year and filed for bankruptcy shortly thereafter.

== Games ==
Year	Title	Platform(s)	Developer(s)
2000	Transformers: Beast Wars Transmetals	PlayStation	Takara
2000	Transformers: Beast Wars Transmetals	Nintendo 64	Takara
2000	The Powerpuff Girls: Bad Mojo Jojo	Game Boy Color	Sennari Interactive
2000	Dexter's Laboratory: Robot Rampage	Game Boy Color	Altron
2000	The Powerpuff Girls: Paint the Townsville Green	Game Boy Color	Sennari Interactive
2000	Yogi Bear: Great Balloon Blast	Game Boy Color	Taito
2000	Sgt. Rock: On the Frontline	Game Boy Color	Altron
2000	Contender 2	PlayStation	Victor Interactive Software
2000	Jimmy White's 2: Cueball	PlayStation	Awesome Developments
2001	The Powerpuff Girls: Battle Him	Game Boy Color	Sennari Interactive
2001	Xtreme Wheels	Game Boy Color	Spike
2001	Fire Pro Wrestling	Game Boy Advance	Spike
2001	Hot Potato	Game Boy Advance	Pukka Games
2001	Sports Illustrated for Kids: Baseball	Game Boy Advance	Sennari Interactive
2001	Dexter's Laboratory: Deesaster Strikes!	Game Boy Advance	Virtucraft
2001	The Powerpuff Girls: Mojo Jojo's Pet Project	Microsoft Windows	Intelligent Games
2001	The Powerpuff Girls: Gamesville	Microsoft Windows	Intelligent Games
2001	Dexter's Laboratory: Science Ain't Fair	Microsoft Windows	Intelligent Games
2001	The Powerpuff Girls: Chemical X-Traction	PlayStation	VIS Entertainment; Asylum Entertainment
2001	The Powerpuff Girls: Chemical X-Traction	Nintendo 64	VIS Entertainment; Asylum Entertainment
2001	Driven	PlayStation 2	BAM! Studios Europe
2001	Driven	Game Boy Advance	Crawfish Interactive
2001	The Powerpuff Girls: Mojo Jojo A-Go-Go	Game Boy Advance	Sennari Interactive
2002	Broken Sword: The Shadow of the Templars	Game Boy Advance	Revolution Software
2002	WRC: World Rally Championship	PlayStation 2	Evolution Studios
2002	Wolfenstein 3D	Game Boy Advance	Stalker Entertainment
2002	Driven	GameCube	BAM! Studios Europe
2002	Savage Skies	PlayStation 2	Irock Interactive
2002	Dexter's Laboratory: Mandark's Lab?	PlayStation	Red Lemon Studios
2002	Star X	Game Boy Advance	Graphic State
2002	Dropship: United Peace Force	PlayStation 2	Team Soho
2002	Way of the Samurai	PlayStation 2	Acquire
2002	Wipeout Fusion	PlayStation 2	Studio Liverpool
2002	Kong: The Animated Series	Game Boy Advance	Planet Interactive
2002	Riding Spirits	PlayStation 2	Spike
2002	Ballistic: Ecks vs. Sever II	Game Boy Advance	Crawfish Interactive
2002	Ed, Edd n Eddy: Jawbreakers!	Game Boy Advance	Climax Group
2002	Fire Pro Wrestling 2	Game Boy Advance	Spike
2002	Chase: Hollywood Stunt Driver	Xbox	I-Imagine Interactive
2002	Dexter's Laboratory: Chess Challenge	Game Boy Advance	Virtucraft
2002	Reign of Fire	PlayStation 2	Kuju Entertainment
2002	Reign of Fire	GameCube	Kuju Entertainment
2002	Reign of Fire	Xbox	Kuju Entertainment
2002	Reign of Fire	Game Boy Advance	Crawfish Interactive
2002	The Powerpuff Girls: HIM and Seek	Game Boy Advance	Vicarious Visions
2002	Runabout 3: Neo Age	PlayStation 2	Climax Entertainment
2002	Disney's Winnie the Pooh: Preschool	PlayStation	Hi Corp
2002	Disney's Winnie the Pooh: Kindergarten	PlayStation	Hi Corp
2002	My Disney Kitchen	PlayStation	Atlus
2002	The Powerpuff Girls: Relish Rampage	PlayStation 2	VIS Entertainment
2003	Samurai Jack: The Amulet of Time	Game Boy Advance	Virtucraft
2003	Sports Illustrated for Kids: Football	Game Boy Advance	Sennari Interactive
2003	4x4 Evo 2	PlayStation 2	Terminal Reality
2003	Wallace & Gromit in Project Zoo	PlayStation 2	Frontier Developments
2003	Wallace & Gromit in Project Zoo	GameCube	Frontier Developments
2003	Wallace & Gromit in Project Zoo	Xbox	Frontier Developments
2003	Wallace & Gromit in Project Zoo	Microsoft Windows	Frontier Developments
2003	The Powerpuff Girls: Relish Rampage - Pickled Edition	GameCube	VIS Entertainment
2004	A Sound of Thunder	Game Boy Advance	Möbius Entertainment
2004	Carmen Sandiego: The Secret of the Stolen Drums	PlayStation 2	Artificial Mind and Movement
2004	Carmen Sandiego: The Secret of the Stolen Drums	GameCube	Artificial Mind and Movement
2004	Carmen Sandiego: The Secret of the Stolen Drums	Xbox	Artificial Mind and Movement
2004	Bujingai: The Forsaken City	PlayStation 2	Taito
2005	Ice Nine	Game Boy Advance	Torus Games
