= Spike (company) =

Japanese video game developer and publisher

Spike Co., Ltd.
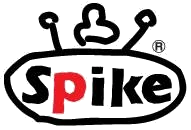
- Native name: 株式会社スパイク
- Type: Kabushiki gaisha
- Industry: Video games
- Founded: December 1989; 36 years ago (as Mizuki); April 1997; 29 years ago (as Spike)
- Defunct: April 1, 2012; 14 years ago
- Fate: Merged with Chunsoft
- Successor: Spike Chunsoft
- Headquarters: Meguro, Tokyo, Japan
- Key people: Mitsutoshi Sakurai (Spike, president); Kiyonori Sawada (Mizuki, president); Maki Kimura (director); Hiroyuki Kaneko (director); Junko Yaguchi (auditor); Koichiro Matsumoto (auditor)
- Products: Fire Pro Wrestling series; Dragon Ball Z: Budokai Tenkaichi series; Danganronpa series; Conception series
- Revenue: ¥60 million (2012)
- Number of employees: 99 (2011)
- Parent: Sammy Corporation (Former; 1999-2005); Dwango (Current, pre-merge with Chunsoft; 2005-2012)
- Website: spike.co.jp at the Wayback Machine (archived March 12, 2012)

Spike Co., Ltd. (株式会社スパイク, Kabushiki-gaisha Supaiku) was a Japanese video game developer and publisher. Most of the staff were part of Human Entertainment. Human's Fire Pro Wrestling series was acquired by Spike after Human ceased operations. In April 2012, the company merged with Chunsoft to become Spike Chunsoft.

== History ==
Spike was founded in December 1989 as Mizuki Ltd. (有限会社みずき, Yūgen-gaisha Mizuki) Its name was changed to Mizuki Co., Ltd. (株式会社みずき, Kabushiki-gaisha Mizuki) on October 18, 1991 and then to Spike Co., Ltd. in April 1997. Spike sold its book publishing business to Aspect in March 1999. Spike was acquired by Sammy in 1999.

Spike established a game development subsidiary named Vaill (ヴァイル株式会社, Vairu kabushiki-gaisha) which consisted of former Human staff in November 1999, and it was eventually absorbed back into Spike in July 2001. In November 2005, Spike was bought by Dwango.

In 2012, it merged with its sister company Chunsoft and became Spike Chunsoft. Two games were in development at the time of the merger: Conception: Ore no Kodomo o Undekure! and Danganronpa 2: Goodbye Despair.

== Games ==
=== Publisher ===
Title	Developer(s)	Platform(s)	Release date	Localized
Lupin the 3rd Chronicles	Spike	Sega Saturn	August 8, 1997	No
DJ Wars	Exit	Sega Saturn	December 18, 1997	No
Yuuyami Doori Tankentai	Exit	PlayStation	October 7, 1999	No
Fire Pro Wrestling A	Vaill	Game Boy Advance	March 21, 2001	Yes
Way of the Samurai	Acquire	PlayStation 2	February 7, 2002	Yes
Formation Soccer 2002	Garden	Game Boy Advance	May 2, 2002	No
King of Colosseum	Spike	PlayStation 2	December 19, 2002	No
Bakusou Dekotora Densetsu: Otoko Hanamichi Yume Roman	Dual	PlayStation 2	January 23, 2003	No
Way of the Samurai 2	Acquire	PlayStation 2	October 9, 2003	Yes
Michigan: Report from Hell	Grasshopper Manufacture	PlayStation 2	August 5, 2004	Yes
King of Colosseum II	Spike	PlayStation 2	September 9, 2004	No
Hard Luck	Garden	PlayStation 2	October 28, 2004	Yes
Kenshui Tendo Dokuta	Spike	Nintendo DS	December 2, 2004	No
Samurai Western	Acquire	PlayStation 2	January 1, 2005	Yes
Shin Bakusou Dekotora Densetsu	Jaleco	PlayStation 2	February 10, 2005	No
Kenka Bancho	YSK	PlayStation 2	June 9, 2005	No
Kenshui Tendo Dokuta 2: Inochi no Tenbin	Spike	Nintendo DS	October 20, 2005	Yes
Necro-Nesia	Spike	Wii	December 2, 2006	Yes
Kenka Bancho 2: Full Throttle	YSK	PlayStation 2	March 8, 2007	No
KuruKuru Princess	Digital Kids	Nintendo DS	March 15, 2007	Yes
Elvandia Story	Spike	PlayStation 2	April 26, 2007	No
KuruKuru Princess II	Digital Kids	Nintendo DS	December 13, 2007	Yes
Bakusou Dekotora Densetsu Black	Dearfield	Nintendo DS	March 20, 2008	No
Jawa: Mammoth to Himitsu no Ishi	Spike	Wii	July 3, 2008	No
Twilight Syndrome: Kinjirareta Toshi Densetsu	Xax Entertainment	Nintendo DS	July 24, 2008	No
Way of the Samurai 3	Acquire	PlayStation 3	November 13, 2008	Yes
Kenka Bancho 3: Zenkoku Seiha	Bullets	PlayStation Portable	November 27, 2008	Yes
Princess Ballerina	Spike	Nintendo DS	December 18, 2008	Yes
Shinjyuku no Ōkami	YSK	PlayStation 2	February 19, 2009	No
428: Shibuya Scramble	Chunsoft	PlayStation 3	September 3, 2009	No
428: Shibuya Scramble	Chunsoft	PlayStation Portable	September 17, 2009	No
428: Shibuya Scramble	Chunsoft	iOS	November 3, 2011	No
999: Nine Hours, Nine Persons, Nine Doors	Chunsoft	Nintendo DS	December 10, 2009	Yes
KuruKuru Princess III	Spike	Nintendo DS	December 10, 2009	No
Fushigi no Dungeon: Fuurai no Shiren 3 Portable	Chunsoft	PlayStation Portable	January 28, 2010	No
Fushigi no Dungeon: Fūrai no Shiren 4: Kami no Hitomi to Akuma no Heso	Chunsoft	Nintendo DS	February 25, 2010	No
Kenka Bancho 4: Ichinen Sensō	Bullets	PlayStation Portable	February 25, 2010	No
Danganronpa: Trigger Happy Havoc	Spike	PlayStation Portable	November 25, 2010	No
Kenka Bancho 5: Otoko no Rule	Bullets	PlayStation Portable	January 27, 2011	No
Way of the Samurai 4	Acquire	PlayStation 3	March 3, 2011	Yes
Gachitora!: Abarenbou Kyoushi in High School	Spike	PlayStation Portable	April 21, 2011	No

=== Developer ===
Title	Publisher(s)	Platform(s)	Release date
Xtreme Wheels	BAM! Entertainment	Game Boy Color	April 26, 2001
Crimson Tears	Capcom	PlayStation 2	April 22, 2004
Dragon Ball Z: Budokai Tenkaichi	Bandai	PlayStation 2	October 6, 2005
Dragon Ball Z: Budokai Tenkaichi 2	Bandai Namco Games	PlayStation 2	October 5, 2006
Dragon Ball Z: Budokai Tenkaichi 2	Bandai Namco Games	Wii	November 19, 2006
Dragon Ball Z: Budokai Tenkaichi 3	Bandai Namco Games	PlayStation 2	October 4, 2007
Dragon Ball Z: Budokai Tenkaichi 3	Bandai Namco Games	Wii	October 4, 2007
Dragon Ball: Raging Blast	Bandai Namco Games	PlayStation 3	November 9, 2009
Dragon Ball: Raging Blast	Bandai Namco Games	Xbox 360	November 9, 2009
Dragon Ball Z: Tenkaichi Tag Team	Bandai Namco Games	PlayStation Portable	September 30, 2010
Dragon Ball: Raging Blast 2	Bandai Namco Games	PlayStation 3	November 2, 2010
Dragon Ball: Raging Blast 2	Bandai Namco Games	Xbox 360	November 2, 2010
Dragon Ball Z: Ultimate Tenkaichi	Bandai Namco Games	PlayStation 3	October 25, 2011
Dragon Ball Z: Ultimate Tenkaichi	Bandai Namco Games	Xbox 360	October 25, 2011

=== Localization ===
Title	Platform(s)	Release date
Colin McRae: The Rally	PlayStation	March 11, 1999
Syphon Filter	PlayStation	August 12, 1999
V-Rally Edition '99	Nintendo 64	October 14, 1999
V-Rally Edition '99	Game Boy Color	October 14, 1999
V-Rally Champion Edition 2	PlayStation	January 27, 2000
Driver	PlayStation	March 9, 2000
Denkō Sekka Micro Runner: Maniac Hakushi no Hisaku	PlayStation	November 2, 2000
WTC: World Touring Cars	PlayStation	November 9, 2000
World Rally Championship	PlayStation 2	March 14, 2002
WRC II Extreme	PlayStation 2	April 24, 2003
WRC 3	PlayStation 2	May 27, 2004
WRC 4	PlayStation 2	April 7, 2005
True Crime: New York City	PlayStation 2	July 27, 2006
Commandos: Strike Force	PlayStation 2	September 21, 2006
Tomb Raider: Legend	Xbox 360	October 5, 2006
Tomb Raider: Legend	PlayStation Portable	December 7, 2006
Tomb Raider: Legend	PlayStation 3	December 7, 2006
Call of Duty 3	Xbox 360	March 29, 2007
Call of Duty 3	PlayStation 3	June 14, 2007
Urban Chaos: Riot Response	PlayStation 2	June 28, 2007
Battlestations: Midway	Xbox 360	February 7, 2008
BioShock	Xbox 360	February 21, 2008
BioShock	PlayStation 3	December 25, 2008
Tomb Raider: Anniversary	Xbox 360	March 27, 2008
Tomb Raider: Anniversary	PlayStation Portable	March 27, 2008
Tomb Raider: Anniversary	PlayStation 2	March 27, 2008
Tomb Raider: Anniversary	Wii	March 27, 2008
Haze	PlayStation 3	May 22, 2008
Kane & Lynch: Dead Men	Xbox 360	July 10, 2008
Kane & Lynch: Dead Men	PlayStation 3	July 10, 2008
The Darkness	Xbox 360	September 11, 2008
The Darkness	PlayStation 3	September 11, 2008
Double Clutch	Xbox 360	September 11, 2008
Double Clutch	PlayStation 3	September 11, 2008
Tomb Raider: Underworld	Xbox 360	January 29, 2009
Tomb Raider: Underworld	PlayStation 3	January 29, 2009
Tomb Raider: Underworld	PlayStation 2	April 23, 2009
Tomb Raider: Underworld	Wii	April 23, 2009
Midnight Club: LA Remix	PlayStation Portable	February 5, 2009
Midnight Club: Los Angeles	Xbox 360	February 5, 2009
Midnight Club: Los Angeles	PlayStation 3	February 5, 2009
Rockstar Games Presents Table Tennis	Wii	April 16, 2009
Battlestations: Pacific	Xbox 360	May 28, 2009
Wanted: Weapons of Fate	Xbox 360	June 25, 2009
Wanted: Weapons of Fate	PlayStation 3	June 25, 2009
Red Faction: Guerrilla	Xbox 360	August 6, 2009
Red Faction: Guerrilla	PlayStation 3	August 6, 2009
MadWorld	Wii	February 10, 2010
Sacred 2: Fallen Angel	Xbox 360	February 10, 2010
Sacred 2: Fallen Angel	PlayStation 3	February 10, 2010
Metro 2033	Xbox 360	May 13, 2010
Greed Corp	PlayStation 3	July 15, 2010
Astro Tripper	PlayStation 3	August 19, 2010
Homefront	Xbox 360	April 14, 2011
Homefront	PlayStation 3	April 14, 2011
Dead Island	Xbox 360	October 20, 2011
Dead Island	PlayStation 3	October 20, 2011
Dragon Age: Origins	Xbox 360	February 2, 2012
Dragon Age: Origins	PlayStation 3	February 2, 2012
