= Hot Potato (video game) =

2001 video game

- Developer: Pukka Games
- Publisher: BAM! Entertainment
- Composer: Allister Brimble
- Platform: Game Boy Advance
- Release: NA: June 28, 2001; UK: November 2, 2001
- Genre: Puzzle
- Mode: Single player

Hot Potato is a puzzle video game developed by Pukka Games and published by BAM! Entertainment for the Game Boy Advance. It was released in North America on June 28, 2001, and in the United Kingdom on November 2, 2001.

In the game, the player must simultaneously drive a bus and clear roads of alien potato beings. The beings are scattered across the street, and by shooting out rows of alien potatoes, they can be cleared from the player's path. The player must clear a set number of aliens to proceed in the game. Hot Potato received mostly above average reviews from critics.

== Gameplay ==
The player's bus fires a row of three female potato aliens outward. The goal is to match like-colored potato aliens in order to clear a path for the bus.

The game tasks the player with navigating a bus through roads filled with alien potato beings. The player's bus holds female members of the alien race, and the player can shoot the females from the front of the bus in order to clear the alien potatoes. The aliens come in two colors: red and blue. Aliens are cleared from the road when two like-colored potatoes touch each other, but aliens begin to pile up in the road if two aliens hit each other that are not of the same color. The road is continuously scrolling downwards, forcing the player to make holes in the road wide enough to fit the bus through. The game can end prematurely if the player runs into too many aliens and loses all their lives.

Hot Potato features seven missions and seven score challenges. Mission mode requires the player to clear out a set number of an alien species. There are multiple alien species in the mode and the mission does not finish until the player gets rid of enough of a certain species chosen by the game from the road. Score challenge mode tasks the player with clearing away a certain number of aliens in order to reach a pre-determined score. The game contains bonus levels which are longer than normal levels if the player is able to complete missions under a certain time period.

== Development ==
Hot Potato was developed for over four years by game designer Dima Pavlovsky before development was picked up by Pukka Games. The game was designed to emulate the success of Tetris with an addictive and original puzzle design. Pukka included the humorous storyline about potato alien beings in the game mostly for laughs and to give the game "charm". The game was first displayed at the 2001 E3. The game was released in North America on June 28, 2001, and in the United Kingdom on November 2.

== Reception ==
Reception

Aggregate scores
Aggregator	Score
GameRankings	66.42% (12 reviews)
Metacritic	74% (7 reviews)

Review scores
Publication	Score
AllGame	3.5/5
Eurogamer	8/10
GameSpot	7.7/10
IGN	8/10
Nintendo Power	2.5/5

Hot Potato garnered above mostly positive reception from critics; it received 66.42% and 74% ratings on review aggregate websites GameRankings and Metacritic respectively.

John Bye of Eurogamer called the game "curiously amusing" and felt that kids would enjoy the game. Craig Harris of IGN noted that the game was surprisingly fun to play, and that the game would appeal to a unique niche in the video game market. He criticized it for failing to introduce the player to the point of the game, forcing the player to figure out how to play on their own. Jay Semerad of Allgame commented that the game provided a surprising amount of challenge, which increased the game's replayability. Frank Provo of GameSpot praised the game's visuals and sound effects, noting that they added to the experience of the game. He felt that the game was not as addictive as some other contemporary puzzle games, but he praised the game nonetheless. The game's release at a $39.99 price in the United States was seen by some reviewers as being too expensive.

Bob Tedeschi of The New York Times commented that Toys 'R' Us had originally chosen to not distribute Hot Potato, but began to stock the game after it looked like a big seller.
