= Hot Potato (The Wiggles song) =

1994 children's song by the Wiggles

Single by The Wiggles

from the album Yummy Yummy
- Released: 27 October 1994
- Genre: Children's; novelty
- Length: 1:21 (1998): 1:13 (1994); 1:18 (The Young Wiggles)
- Songwriters: Greg Page, Murray Cook

"Hot Potato" is a 1994 children's song by the Wiggles. The song had its studio release on the Yummy Yummy album in 1994. It is among the most popular songs in the Wiggles discography.

The song mimics the style of 1950s rock and roll, and has been described as "catchy", with a "good beat, easy to dance to".

== Composition ==
Originally titled "Hot Tamale", the song was first created by John Field, the brother and former bandmate of the Wiggles founder Anthony Field, when the Wiggles were busking. It was renamed "Hot Potato" because the Wiggles felt the new title would be more familiar to children.

The Wiggles received songwriting help from John Field and from Phillip Wilcher, who was working with the early childhood music program at Macquarie University. After contributing to their first album, hosting the group's first recording sessions in his Sydney home, and appearing in a couple of the group's first videos, Wilcher left the group and went into classical music. (Note: In 2003, Wilcher claimed that his involvement with the Wiggles had been "virtually erased"; in the late 1990s, they re-recorded their first album, renamed it, and removed all of Wilcher's compositions.) The group reworked several songs by The Cockroaches for the children's music genre, including a tune called "Hot Tamale" that they changed to "Hot Potato". Anthony Field gave copies of their album to his young students to test out the effect of the group's music on children; one mother returned it the next day because her child would not stop listening to it.

== Reception and legacy ==
The Associated Press described the Wiggles' self-written songs (and specifically Hot Potato) as "deceptively simple and receptive — 'Hot potato, cold spaghetti, mashed banana' is an entire lyric — but have complex harmonies, shifting rhythms and joyous, brassy counterpoints."

In 2006, Jeff Fatt said "Hot Potato" was the group’s most-requested song. It is among the group's most well-known releases, along with songs such as "Fruit Salad", "Rock-a Bye Your Bear", and "Toot Toot, Chugga Chugga, Big Red Car".

Anthony Field has said of successful children's music, "It's gotta be in the world of children, something they're interested in, something they can sing or dance along to."

Jeff Fatt said, in reference to Hot Potato and Fruit Salad, said "I do love healthy food", and called Hot Potato "a great action song". The punk band The Living End released a Hot Potato cover for ReWiggled: A Tribute to The Wiggles.
