= LifeSigns: Surgical Unit =

2005 video game

LifeSigns: Surgical Unit (PAL) LifeSigns: Hospital Affairs
- European cover art
- Developer: Spike
- Publishers: JP: Spike; NA: DreamCatcher Games; EU: JoWooD Productions
- Director: Nobuyasu Motoki
- Platform: Nintendo DS
- Release: JP: October 20, 2005; UK: October 19, 2007; NA: November 6, 2007; AU: November 14, 2008; FRA: March 27, 2009
- Genres: Adventure, simulator
- Mode: Single-player

LifeSigns: Surgical Unit, (Note: Known in Japan as Kenshūi Tendō Dokuta 2: Inochi no Tenbin (研修医 天堂独太2～命の天秤～; Resident Doctor Dokuta Tendo 2: The Scales of Life)) released in Europe as LifeSigns: Hospital Affairs, is an adventure game for the Nintendo DS set in a hospital. LifeSigns is the followup to Kenshūi Tendō Dokuta, a game released at the end of 2004; that game has not been released outside Japan, although the localized LifeSigns still makes reference to it.

The game is commented as being "like Phoenix Wright crossed with Trauma Center".

== Characters ==
=== Seimei Medical University Hospital ===
Dokuta Tendo (天堂 独太, Tendō Dokuta) (Age 25, Male)

A second-year intern at the prestigious Seimei Medical University Hospital. He is studying Emergency medicine. He can be a little naive but he is very talented. He devoted his life to helping people after seeing his mother die of cancer. In the first game, he misdiagnosed a patient, which nearly ruined his career. His given name is derived from the English word "doctor", transliterated with kanji.

Sachi Hoshi (星 幸, Hoshi Sachi) (Age 22, Female) A nurse who has been working at the hospital 1 year before Tendo. She seems to be careless at times, but nonetheless, she is a talented and devoted nurse. She seems to have a crush on Tendo. She is one of the girls Tendo can date later in the game.

Suzu Asou (麻生 鈴, Asou Suzu) (Age 36, Female)

An extremely gifted surgeon, Asou is Tendo's supervisor and mentor. She recently got over her alcoholism after a disastrous break-up with Prof. Sawai (first game). She is the head of the 3rd Surgery Department, which specializes in heart diseases. Tendo seems to have a crush on her. She wears a bell choker around her neck.

Kyousuke Sawai (Age 52, Male)

A world authority in the field of immunology, and head of the 1st Surgical Department of Seimei Medical University Hospital. A cold and callous man who only seems to be interested in results. In the first game, it was revealed that he was Tendo's biological father and arranged his transfer to the Seimei. He is involved in the cancer treatment research and recently developed a miracle drug that might cure cancer called SPX (Sawai Power Plex). He also dated Suzu Asou for a short time which ended disastrously a few years ago. He is operated by Tendo in the final chapter, after a ballpoint pen pierced his heart in a car accident.

Yuma Aoshima (Age 24, Female)

The newest intern in the Seimei, Aoshima is an ambitious and stubborn girl who seems to enjoying eating more than anything else in the world. Because of her inexperience, she makes many mistakes at the beginning of her career in Seimei. She is one of the girls Tendo can date in the final chapter.

Ai Ueto (Age 26, Female)

A pediatrician who started her internship a year before Tendo. She was Hikaru's doctor when she was treated in Seimei. She recently switched to glasses after deciding her shades were giving her a cold appearance. According to Florence, it is rumoured that she has a new boyfriend.

Keiichi Kashiwagi (Age 47, Male)

A fat, balding doctor specializing in internal medicine.

Florence Makiko Sakurada (Age 60, Female)

Chief Nurse of Seimei. She loves gossiping and seems to know whatever is going on in the hospital. Her nickname "Florence" is obviously a reference to famous nurse Florence Nightingale.

Sanae Kurai (Age 28, Female)

An operation room nurse who has a gloomy and mysterious personality. Despite her initial impression, she is one of the three girls Tendo can date in the game.

Utsujiu Masui (Age 30, Male)

An eccentric anesthesiologist who is interested in Hoshi. He is married and has children but was recently kicked out of his house by his wife for some unknown reason.

Hikaru Sawai (Age 10, Female)

Prof. Sawai's bald daughter and Tendo's stepsister. Hikaru was diagnosed with leukemia in the first game and was being treated in the Seimei. She recovered and returned to school when Tendo donated his bone marrow to her. Despite the tension between Prof. Sawai and Tendo, he and Hikaru are quite fond of each other.

== Gameplay ==
The game is separated into five separate chapters, dealing with the main story in an episodic format. Each chapter contains one or more of the following elements:

=== Exploring ===
The first type of gameplay is common to all Japanese adventure games. The main character, Tendo, explores an area, conversing with other people and furthering the story.

=== Mini-games ===
There are many mini-games in LifeSigns, which can in some way affect the course of the story. Most mini-games involve simple tasks, such as catching fruit that's rolling down a hill, or catching fish.

- Persuasion - On occasion, the story will split, and can follow a different path. It is up to the player, in this mini game, to convince another person to do something. If the player is successful, then the story will continue along the good path. If not, then the episode may have a bad ending.

=== Diagnoses ===
When someone is sick or injured, the player may need to diagnose the patient and decide what is wrong with them. Diagnosis commonly involves taking a patient's pulse, listening to their breathing, and examining abrasions, bruises, and swelling.

=== Surgery ===
After diagnosing a patient, the player must perform surgery on them. During the surgery phase of the game, the player must perform a series of simple steps, one at a time, from disinfecting an area and making an incision, to the surgery itself, and finally closing the patient up. Unlike Trauma Center, the player is automatically handed the tool they need at each stage. There are a total of nine different operations in LifeSigns (though the number of surgeries the player does depends on the path the player takes).

== Reception ==
Reception

Aggregate score
Aggregator	Score
Metacritic	61/100

Review scores
Publication	Score
Famitsu	30/40
Game Informer	6/10
GamesMaster	65%
GameSpot	6.5/10
GameZone	7.5/10
IGN	5.5/10
Nintendo World Report	6.5/10
Official Nintendo Magazine	46%
Pocket Gamer	2/5
RPGFan	83%

LifeSigns received "mixed" reviews according to the review aggregation website Metacritic. Some reviews praised the game for the realistic hospital setting and large amounts of character interaction, while others criticized it for "a heavy dose of conversations", unbalanced gameplay, and its feel being "less like a game." In Japan, Famitsu gave it a score of two eights and two sevens for a total of 30 out of 40.
