= Dropship (software) =

- Original author(s): Wladimir van der Laan
- Initial release: April 2011
- Final release: 0.0.1 / April 26, 2011
- Repository: github.com/driverdan/dropship
- Written in: Python
- Operating system: Cross-platform
- Type: Computer security
- License: MIT license
- Website: dropship at github

Dropship was a set of API utilities for use with Dropbox accounts. The utilities used Dropbox's de-duplication facilities to allow files, identified by their Dropbox hashes, to be copied from Dropbox's servers.

According to the GitHub project, dropship is no longer functional due to the backend changes Dropbox made to their service.

== Controversy ==
Dropship was the target of legal maneuvering by Dropbox that attempted to shut down the project and remove it from the Internet. The mechanism of Dropbox's attempt to shut down the Dropship project generated both online discussion and negative press for the company.

== See also ==
- Dropbox
