= Crawfish Interactive =

British video game developer

- Company type: Private
- Industry: Video games
- Founded: March 1997; 29 years ago
- Founder: Cameron Sheppard
- Defunct: November 2002; 23 years ago
- Fate: Defunct
- Headquarters: Croydon, London, UK
- Key people: Cameron Sheppard; Mike Merren; Steve Collett
- Products: Games for Game Boy Color and Game Boy Advance
- Website: crawfishinteractive.com (archived)

Crawfish Interactive was a British video game developer based in Croydon, London.

== Overview ==
The company was founded in March 1997 and closed in November 2002. The company specialised in games software for the Game Boy Color and Game Boy Advance formats. Upon closure, former employees of the company joined Climax as a development team for handheld formats. The last two games, Superman: Countdown to Apokolips and Ed, Edd n Eddy: Jawbreakers!, both started development at the studio, but it was later finished by Mistic Software and Climax, respectively.

== Games developed ==
- Bust-a-Move 2: Arcade Edition (GB, 1998)
- WWF War Zone (GB, 1998)
- Bust-a-Move 3 (GB, 1998)
- Bust-A-Move 4 (GBC, 1999)
- WWF Attitude (GBC, 1999)
- Space Invaders (GBC, 1999)
- Maya the Bee & Her Friends (GBC, 1999)
- The New Adventures of Mary-Kate and Ashley (GBC, 1999)
- ECW Hardcore Revolution (GBC, 2000)
- Godzilla: The Series (GBC, 1999)
- Ready 2 Rumble Boxing (GBC, 1999)
- Godzilla: The Series - Monster Wars (GBC, 2000)
- Tom Clancy's Rainbow Six (GBC, 2000)
- Mary-Kate and Ashley: Get A Clue (GBC, 2000)
- Street Fighter Alpha (GBC, 2000)
- Disney's Aladdin (GBC, 2000)
- Cruis'n Exotica (GBC, 2000)
- Driver (GBC, 2000)
- X-Men: Mutant Academy (GBC, 2000)
- Aliens: Thanatos Encounter (GBC, 2001)
- Ecks vs. Sever (GBA, 2001)
- Lego Island 2: The Brickster's Revenge (GBC, 2001)
- Mary-Kate and Ashley: Crush Course (GBC, 2001)
- Roswell Conspiracies (GBC, 2001)
- Razor Freestyle Scooter (GBC, 2001)
- Ready 2 Rumble Boxing: Round 2 (GBA, 2001)
- Razor Freestyle Scooter (GBA, 2001)
- Driven (GBA, 2001)
- Robot Wars: Advanced Destruction (GBA, 2001)
- Disney's Peter Pan: Return to Neverland (GBA, 2002)
- NASCAR Heat 2002 (GBA, 2002)
- Nicktoons Racing (GBA, 2002)
- Street Fighter Alpha 3 (GBA, 2002)
- Speedball 2: Brutal Deluxe (GBA, 2002)
- Ballistic: Ecks vs. Sever (GBA, 2002)
- Defender of the Crown (GBA, 2002)
- Reign of Fire (GBA, 2002)
- The Three Stooges (GBA, 2002)
- Wings (GBA, 2003)

=== Cancelled ===
- Grand Theft Auto: III (GBA, unreleased)
- Gods (GBA, unreleased)
- South Park (GBC, unreleased)
