= List of World Rally Championship video games =

This is a list of video games based on, or otherwise licensed by, the FIA's World Rally Championship.

== WRC by Evolution Studios series ==
Developed by Evolution Studios and published by Sony Computer Entertainment exclusively for the PlayStation 2 console:

- World Rally Championship (2001) – Cars, tracks and drivers from the 2001 World Rally Championship.
- WRC II Extreme (2002) – Cars, tracks and drivers from the 2002 World Rally Championship.
- WRC 3 (2003) – Cars, tracks and drivers from the 2003 World Rally Championship.
- WRC 4 (2004) – Cars, tracks and drivers from the 2004 World Rally Championship.
- WRC: Rally Evolved (2005) – Released only in Europe, contains cars, tracks and drivers from the 2005 World Rally Championship.
- World Rally Championship (2005) – A PlayStation Portable game based on WRC: Rally Evolved. Developed by Traveller's Tales and SCEE, and published by Namco and Sony Computer Entertainment. Like its predecessor, World Rally Championship is based around the 2005 season and features 30 fully deformable 2005 WRC, Evolution and Extreme spec cars. In championship mode, players have the opportunity to play through the entire WRC season as any one of the 17 official 2004 registered drivers from the 6 official manufacturers, participating in 16 official rallies spanning 5 continents and 16 countries. Additionally, there are 19 bonus stages and downloadable content available to users. In addition to championship mode, there are also quick rally, time trial and single rally single-player game modes. World Rally Championship also supports various ad hoc multiplayer modes, such as wireless time trial, turn-based time trial, turn-based single rally, and turn-based championship.

== WRC by Milestone series ==
Developed by Milestone and published by Black Bean Games. These were all released for Microsoft Windows, PlayStation 3 and Xbox 360:

- WRC: FIA World Rally Championship (2010) – Cars, tracks and drivers from the 2010 World Rally Championship.
- WRC 2: FIA World Rally Championship (2011) – Cars, tracks and drivers from the 2011 World Rally Championship.
- WRC 3: FIA World Rally Championship (2012) – Cars, tracks and drivers from the 2012 World Rally Championship.
- WRC 4: FIA World Rally Championship (2013) – Cars, tracks and drivers from the 2013 World Rally Championship.
- WRC Powerslide (2013) – Officially licensed arcade spin-off released for PlayStation Network, Xbox Live Arcade, PC

== WRC by Bigben Interactive SA series ==
Developed by Bigben Interactive SA and published by Bigben Interactive:

WRC The Official Game (2014) – Android, IOS, 3DS. Includes cars, tracks and drivers from the 2014 World Rally Championship.

== WRC by Kylotonn series ==
Developed by Kylotonn and published by Bigben Interactive or Nacon:

- WRC 5 (2015) – Microsoft Windows, PlayStation 3, PlayStation 4, Xbox 360, Xbox One, PlayStation Vita. Includes cars, tracks and drivers from the 2015 World Rally Championship.
- WRC 6 (2016) – Microsoft Windows, PlayStation 4, Xbox One. Includes cars, tracks and drivers from the 2016 World Rally Championship.
- WRC 7 (2017) – Microsoft Windows, PlayStation 4, Xbox One. Includes cars, tracks and drivers from the 2017 World Rally Championship.
- WRC 8 (2019) – Microsoft Windows, PlayStation 4, Xbox One, Nintendo Switch. Includes cars, tracks and drivers from the 2019 World Rally Championship.
- WRC 9 (2020) - Microsoft Windows, PlayStation 4, PlayStation 5, Xbox One, Xbox Series X/S, Nintendo Switch. Includes cars, tracks and drivers from the 2020 World Rally Championship.
- WRC 10 (2021) - Microsoft Windows, PlayStation 4, PlayStation 5, Xbox One, Xbox Series X/S, Nintendo Switch. Includes cars, tracks and drivers from the 2021 World Rally Championship.
- WRC Generations (2022) - Microsoft Windows, PlayStation 4, PlayStation 5, Xbox One, Xbox Series X/S. Includes cars, tracks and drivers from the 2022 World Rally Championship.

== WRC by Codemasters and EA Sports ==
Developed by Codemasters and published by EA Sports. Due to be released for Microsoft Windows, PlayStation 5 and Xbox Series X/S:

- EA Sports WRC (2023) – Cars, tracks and drivers.

== Lack of full License ==
=== Rally Championship ===
- International Rally Championship (1997) – PC, PlayStation (as Tommi Makinen Rally). Includes cars from the 1997 World Rally Championship, and 1998 World Rally Championship (Tommi Makinen Rally).
- Mobil 1 Rally Championship (1999) – PC, PlayStation. Based around the 1997 to the 2000 British Rally Championship, but it also features A8 cars from the 1998 World Rally Championship.
- Rally Championship Xtreme (2001) – PC
- Rally Championship (2002) - PS2, GameCube

=== Colin McRae Rally series ===
- Colin McRae Rally (1998) – PlayStation, Windows. Includes cars and drivers from the 1998 World Rally Championship.
- Colin McRae Rally 2.0 (2000) – PlayStation, Windows. Includes cars from the 2000 World Rally Championship.
- Colin McRae Rally 3 (2002) – PlayStation 2, Xbox, Windows. Includes cars from the 2002 World Rally Championship.
- Colin McRae Rally 04 (2003) – PlayStation 2, Xbox, PC
- Colin McRae Rally 2005 (2004) – PlayStation 2, Xbox, PC
- Colin McRae: Dirt (2007) – PlayStation 3, Xbox 360, PC
- Colin McRae: Dirt 2 (2009) – PlayStation 3, Xbox 360, PC, Wii, OnLive
- Dirt 3 (2011) – PlayStation 3, Xbox 360, PC, OnLive
- Dirt: Showdown (2012) – PlayStation 3, Xbox 360, PC
- Dirt Rally (2015) – PC, PlayStation 4, Xbox One. Includes cars from the 2015 World Rallycross Championship.
- Dirt 4 (2017) – PC, PlayStation 4, Xbox One. Includes cars from the 2016 World Rallycross Championship.
- Dirt Rally 2.0 (2019) – PC, PlayStation 4, Xbox One. Includes cars from the 2018 World Rallycross Championship.
- Dirt 5 (2020) – PC, PlayStation 4, PlayStation 5, Xbox One, Xbox Series X/S.

=== V-Rally series ===
- V-Rally – PlayStation, Nintendo 64, PC. Includes cars from the 1997 World Rally Championship.
- V-Rally 2 – PlayStation, SEGA Dreamcast, PC. Includes cars from the 1999 World Rally Championship.
- V-Rally 3 – PlayStation 2, Xbox, PC. Includes cars from the 2000 to 2002 World Rally Championship and the 2001 to 2002 Super 1600 Junior World Rally Championship.
- V-Rally 4 – PlayStation 4, Xbox One, PC, Nintendo Switch.

== Individual games ==
- Richard Burns Rally (2004) – PlayStation 2, Xbox, Gizmondo, PC.
- Xpand Rally – PC.
- Xpand Rally Xtreme – PC.
- Euro Rally Champion – PC, PlayStation 2.
- Rally Challenge (1996 video game) – PC. Includes cars from the 1996 World Rally Championship.
- Rally Challenge 2000 – Nintendo 64. Includes cars from the 1998 and 1999 World Rally Championship.
- RalliSport Challenge – Xbox, PC.
- RalliSport Challenge 2 – Xbox.
- Rally Trophy – PC. Featuring Classic WRC cars from the 1960s & 1970s.
- Car Town – PC. Features WRC cars through updates, including Ford Fiesta RS WRC and Mitsubishi Lancer WRC.
- Sega Rally Championship – Arcade, PC, PlayStation 2, Saturn, N-Gage, Game Boy Advance.
- Sega Rally 2 – Arcade, PC, Dreamcast.
- Sega Rally 2006 – PlayStation 2.
- Sega Rally Revo – PC, PlayStation 3, Xbox 360, PSP.
- Sega Rally 3D – J2ME
- Sega Rally 3/Sega Rally Online Arcade – Arcade, PlayStation 3, Xbox 360.
- Sébastien Loeb Rally Evo – PC, PlayStation 4, Xbox One.
- Gran Turismo 5 – PlayStation 3. Released in 2010 and features WRC cars, and around 30 historic rally cars.
- Gran Turismo 6 – PlayStation 3. Released in 2013 and features all the cars from the previous games, and 3 additional Pikes Peak rally cars.
- World Rally (1993) - Arcade racing game by Gaelco, featuring Carlos Sainz Sr.'s 1992 title-winning Repsol-sponsored Toyota Celica GT4 ST185 Group A rally car.
- World Rally 2: Twin Racing (1995) - A sequel of Gaelco's 1993 arcade racing game, it now features rally cars from the 1993 World Rally Championship.
- WRC: FIA World Rally Championship Arcade (2002) - PlayStation.
