= WRC =

WRC may refer to:

== Broadcasting stations ==
- WRC-TV, a television station (virtual channel 4, digital channel 34) licensed to Washington, D.C., United States
- Several radio stations in the Washington, D.C. area:
  - WWRC, a radio station (570 AM) licensed to Bethesda, Maryland
  - WQOF, a radio station (1260 AM) licensed to Washington, D.C., which used the branding "1260 WRC" from 2010 until 2014
  - WTEM, a radio station (980 AM) licensed to Washington, D.C., United States, which used the call sign WRC from 1923 until February 1984
  - WKYS, a radio station (93.9 FM) licensed to Washington, D.C., United States, which used the call sign WRC-FM from 1947 until 1974

== Sports ==
- Warriors RC, a Finnish rugby club in Helsinki
- World Rally Championship, an international car rallying tournament competition
  - World Rally Car, a car built to World Rally Championship specifications, used 1997–2021
- World Ringette Championships, international premier competition for ringette
- World Rowing Championships
- World Rowing Cup
- Wallingford Rowing Club, whose boat code is WRC
- Rugby clubs in England:
  - Wednesbury Rugby Club
  - Whitchurch Rugby Club
  - Wirral Rugby Club

== Video games ==
- WRC (video game series)
- WRC: Rally Evolved
- WRC: FIA World Rally Championship (2010 video game)
- WRC: FIA World Rally Championship Arcade
- EA Sports WRC, also known simply as WRC

== Other uses ==
- RAAF Woomera Range Complex, Australian military and civil aerospace facility
- War reserve constable, a rank within British police forces during World War Two
- WAVE regulatory complex, a protein complex in the WASP family of proteins
- Western Railway Corridor, Ireland
- Western Reserve College (disambiguation), two unrelated institutions in Ohio, USA
- White Ribbon Campaign, a men's movement opposing violence against women
- Will Rice College, subdivision of Rice University
- Women's Republican Council, Armenian NGO
- Worker Rights Consortium, US-based organisation protecting rights of workers making college apparel etc.
- Workplace Relations Commission, adjudication body in Ireland
- World Radiocommunication Conference, supervises usage rules for the radio-frequency spectrum and satellite orbits
- World Riichi Championship, an international competition for Japanese mahjong
- WRc, a private company, formerly Water Research Centre, UK
- Wright Robinson College, a school in Manchester, England
