= V-Rally 4 =

2018 video game

- Developer: Kylotonn
- Publisher: Bigben Interactive
- Series: V-Rally
- Platforms: PlayStation 4, Xbox One, Microsoft Windows, Nintendo Switch
- Release: PlayStation 4 & Xbox One: AU: 6 September 2018; EU: 7 September 2018; NA: 11 September 2018; Microsoft Windows: WW: 25 September 2018; Nintendo Switch: PAL: 13 December 2018; NA: 5 February 2019
- Genre: Racing
- Modes: Single-player, multiplayer

V-Rally 4 is a racing video game developed by Kylotonn and published by Bigben Interactive for PlayStation 4, Xbox One, Microsoft Windows and Nintendo Switch in 2018. It is the sequel to V-Rally 3 (2002). The developer had previously worked on the official 2017 WRC game.

== Gameplay ==
V-Rally 4 is a racing game where players drive rally cars through a series of stages. The game features five disciplines, with 51 cars from 19 manufacturers, including Porsche, Skoda and Norma. Courses include Monument Valley, Niger, Romania and Malaysia.

Rally environments feature 4 stages by default, as well as a unique stage generator that routes a stage through the roads of the map, based on a seed.

== Development ==
V-Rally 4 was developed by Kylotonn, a French video game company based in Paris. Some members of the development team worked on previous V-Rally games.

== Reception ==
Reception

Aggregate scores
| Aggregator | Score |
|---|---|
| GameRankings | (PC) 80.00% (XONE) 70.67% (NS) 62.50% (PS4) 58.50% |
| Metacritic | (XONE) 67/100 (PS4) 58/100 (NS) 51/100 |

Review scores
| Publication | Score |
|---|---|
| IGN | 6/10 |
| Jeuxvideo.com | 65 |
| PlayStation Official Magazine – UK | 6/10 |
| Metro | 5/10 (PS4) |
| 4players.de | 49% |

V-Rally 4 received mixed to generally positive reviews. Aggregating review website GameRankings and Metacritic gave the PC version 80.00%, the Xbox One version 70.67% and 68/100, the PlayStation 4 version 58.50% and 58/100 and the Nintendo Switch version 62.50% and 51/100.

PlayStation Official Magazine said that "the rally fundamentals are there, but so is a disappointingly shoddy career mode. Genre fans will find a lot to love, but this is far from taking pole position". Metro said it was "an unlikely sequel that ultimately struggles to find its place among today's line-up of more polished and more established alternatives". IGN summarised it as "an arcade racing game with some spectacular moments, whose roots are guiltily stuck in the past". 4Players said "while Kylotonns rally games showed positive tendencies with the World Rally Championship series, this is a serious setback. This is a disappointing comeback for the franchise".
