= WRC Generations =

2022 video game

- Cover art featuring the Hyundai i20 N Rally1 of Oliver Solberg and Elliott Edmondson
- Developer: Kylotonn
- Publisher: Nacon
- Series: World Rally Championship
- Platforms: Microsoft Windows; Nintendo Switch; PlayStation 4; PlayStation 5; Xbox One; Xbox Series X/S
- Release: Windows, PlayStation 4, PlayStation 5, Xbox One, Xbox Series X/S; WW: November 3, 2022; Nintendo Switch; WW: December 26, 2022
- Genre: Racing
- Modes: Single-player, multiplayer

WRC Generations is a racing video game developed by Kylotonn and published by Nacon. It is the seventh entry in the World Rally Championship series by the French developer and holds the official license of the 2022 World Rally Championship. The game was released for Microsoft Windows, PlayStation 4, PlayStation 5, Xbox One and Xbox Series X/S on November 3, 2022 and Nintendo Switch on December 26, 2022.

== Gameplay ==
As the new hybrid was implemented in the 2022 season, the game features brand-new car models based on the Ford Puma Rally1, Hyundai i20 N Rally1 and Toyota GR Yaris Rally1 respectively. Other than the three Group Rally1 cars, the game includes Group Rally2 cars and legendary cars, which would ensure vehicle number no fewer than thirty-seven. The Anniversary mode, which was first introduced in WRC 10, has also returned.

== Development and release ==
WRC Generations was revealed on May 18, 2022, with both Kylotonn and Nacon return to work on the game. The game is set to be launched for Microsoft Windows, PlayStation 4, PlayStation 5, Xbox One and Xbox Series X/S platforms. The original release date was October 13, but two weeks before it was moved to November 3. A Nintendo Switch version has been announced for December 1, 2022 but released in North America in December 26, 2022.

== Reception ==
Reception

Aggregate score
| Aggregator | Score |
|---|---|
| Metacritic | (PC) 77/100 (PS5) 74/100 (XSXS) 77/100 |

Review scores
| Publication | Score |
|---|---|
| IGN | 8/10 |
| Jeuxvideo.com | 16/20 |
| Nintendo Life | 5/10 |

WRC Generations received "mixed or average" reviews for PlayStation 5 according to Metacritic, a review aggregator.
