= War Hospital =

- Developer: Brave Lamb Studio
- Publisher: Nacon
- Platforms: PlayStation 5; Windows; Xbox Series X/S
- Release: WW: January 11, 2024
- Genre: Strategy
- Mode: Single-player

War Hospital is a 2024 strategy video game developed by Brave Lamb Studio and published by Nacon. Players manage a British hospital during World War I.

== Gameplay ==
Players manage an isolated British field hospital in Belgium during World War I. War Hospital is a strategy game in which players must perform triage, keep morale up, and defend against German attacks. If morale drops too low, they are replaced and lose the game. Losing patients and starvation cause morale loss. Morale can be improved by increasing rations and sending recovered soldiers home. Alternately, soldiers who return to the trenches can help defend the hospital, and soldiers sent to Allied headquarters provide resources used to upgrade the hospital. Upgrades can also be done after completing missions. When supplies run low, players can go to half-rations or take supplies from the locals, both of which reduce morale. Engineers can produce food, make medicine, or upgrade the hospital, but they can only do one job at a time.

== Development ==
Brave Lamb Studio, a Polish video game studio, was inspired by accounts of World War I surgeons, who said the constant difficult decisions caused them to feel desensitized. The game attempts to replicate this by providing biographical information on the patients to get players to care about saving them, even though they may not have the resources to do so. Nacon released War Hospital for Windows, PlayStation 5, and Xbox Series X/S on January 11, 2024.

== Reception ==
War Hospital received mixed reviews on Metacritic. PC Gamer praised its focus on saving lives during a war rather than killing people. Though they enjoyed the gameplay and emotional moments, they felt the management aspects were "a bit clunky and inelegant". Tech Radar liked the moral ambiguity and difficult choices inherent in triage, but they criticized War Hospital for having occasional bugs and lacking an autosave. Though they said the game succeeds in its goal of making players feel overwhelmed and helpless, Sports Illustrated found it "quite repetitive" and "too punishing".
