= The Cursed Crusade =

2011 video game

- Developer: Kylotonn
- Publishers: EU: dtp; NA: Atlus
- Platforms: Microsoft Windows; PlayStation 3 Xbox 360
- Release: EU: October 7, 2011; NA: October 25, 2011
- Genres: Action, hack and slash
- Modes: Single-player, multiplayer

The Cursed Crusade is a 2011 action hack and slash game developed by Kylotonn and published by DTP Entertainment for Europe and Atlus USA for North America.

== Gameplay ==
The game is set during the Fourth Crusade and stars two crusaders. The player controls Denz de Bayle. He is joined by a partner, the Spanish mercenary Esteban Noviembre, who can either be controlled by AI or by a second player via online or local co-op. The game allows for various cooperative moves, such as grapple executions, team healing, and level progression.

The player controls their character in a third-person perspective, and can rotate the camera 360 degrees, for a full view of their surroundings. The game takes place in a linear adventure across Europe, including locations such as France, Croatia, Constantinople, and Syria.

The game is focused on fighting against waves of enemies, while the combat system is somewhat similar to both Assassin's Creed and Batman Arkham games having some emphasis on blocking and countering. During the game, the player can pick up and wield up to four weapons, including swords, maces, axes, shields, and spears. All of the weapons will break, forcing the player to either conserve their weapons, or find more.

The characters have an ability to use the "Curse", an ability that lets them walk between the divide of Earth and Hell, giving them supernatural powers. The curse will grant the player stronger moves, faster movement speed, and an ability to see collectibles previously hidden. The curse will drain their meter as long as it is in use, and eventually, will kill the player.

== Plot ==
In Syria, 1198, Jean de Bayle, a Crusader and member of the Knights Templar, fights in the Third Crusade to seek redemption for the hereditary "Templar's Curse" which afflicts his bloodline, as well as many other bloodlines with histories of grave sin. While defending the Krak de Chevaliers, fellow Templar Martin d'Algaïs tasks him with escaping the fortress with a prized relic. He does not return home to France, so his treacherous brother lays false claim to his castle, land, title, property, and murders Jean's wife.

Jean's son Denz is a talented swordsman who has never let fear best him in a fight. He has become a skilled mercenary but also suffers from the curse. Helpless to reclaim his family's land from his uncle, he is pursued by the Angel of Death whose job is to claim the souls of those who bear the curse. While laying siege to Biron Castle under Boniface de Montferrat and his commander Baudouin de Flandre, Denz befriends the older and roguish Spaniard Estaban Noviembre, who is also pursued by Death. Martin is mortally wounded defending the castle. Denz later competes in a tournament to gain passage with the Fourth Crusade, taking Estaban as his squire. They defeat Flandre and his men, getting to join Geoffrey de Villehardouin's army en route to the Holy Land where Denz hopes to find Jean in hopes of taking back their castle together.

In 1202, the army falls under the command of Montferrat and Flandre but is unable to pay for Venician ships for transport to the Holy Land, so the Doge Enrico Donaldo makes a deal with the Crusaders to conquer Zara, a Croatian harbor city. Denz and Estaban disable a massive chain blocking the fleet from attacking the city and breach its walls, allowing the city to be sacked and they defeat Ladislaus, Zara's governor gone mad trying to control his curse. Montferrat then finds what he was looking for: a piece of the True Cross; Drenz and Estaban then realize that Montferrat does not seek redemption for his soul via this crusade, but rather is using it as a cover to hunt for relics towards an unknown goal.

In 1204 the Crusaders agree to help Alexius IV retake Constantinople from his uncle Alexius III and rescue his father, the Emperor Issac II, in exchange for paying the Venetians. During the siege, Denz and Estaban encounter Tatikios Lente, the powerful Byzantine captain of the guard. Alexius III flees and the city is retaken, but months later a coup led by Murzuphle, murdering Alexius and Issac, leads the Crusaders to storm the city again and sack it. Murzuphle is defeated but Denz spares him for revealing that two holy artifacts remained in the city: the Crown of Thorns (or rather its petrified thorns set in a crucifix) and the Spear of Longinus. The two turn against Montferrat and ally with Lentes and Princess Theodora, but Montferrat manages to take both relics and uses them to summon several massive demons from Hell. His plan is revealed to use the relics to leverage the forces of Hell in a brutal conquest of the world. Lentes and the princess are killed and Montferrat leaves for the Holy Land to hunt down Jean.

Denz and Estaban pursue Montferrat to Syria and the antiquated Krak de Chevalier, which is full of undead soldiers summoned via portals to Hell, which they are forced to purify and close. There they find the Shroud of Turin, the last relic which had been entrusted to Jean, with a message from Jean. Rather than use the relic to redeem their souls, Denz and Estaban depart for Cairo, Egypt, following Jean's instructions, but not before seeing "hell draws near" written on the Krak's walls with fire.

Weeks later in Cairo, Jean is cornered by Montferrat, who can now maintain his enhanced cursed form permanently, and Jean readies himself for a fight.

== Reception ==
Reception

Aggregate score
Aggregator	Score		
Aggregator	PC	PS3	Xbox 360
Metacritic	55/100	45/100	39/100

Review scores
Publication	Score		
Publication	PC	PS3	Xbox 360
4Players	47%	47%	47%
The A.V. Club	N/A	N/A	D−
Destructoid	N/A	N/A	3.5/10
Eurogamer	N/A	4/10	N/A
Famitsu	N/A	26/40	N/A
Game Informer	N/A	N/A	3/10
GamePro	N/A	2/5	2/5
GameSpot	N/A	3/10	3/10
GameStar	58%	N/A	N/A
IGN	N/A	4/10	4/10
Official Xbox Magazine (US)	N/A	N/A	5.5/10
PlayStation: The Official Magazine	N/A	3/10	N/A
The Digital Fix	N/A	N/A	3/10
Metro	N/A	N/A	2/10

The PC version received "mixed" reviews, while the PlayStation 3 and Xbox 360 versions received "unfavorable" reviews according to the review aggregation website Metacritic. Game Informer criticized the Xbox 360 version's slower combat and its "simple boss fights, brain-dead puzzles, and infrequent set pieces." GameSpot defined the game as a "repetitive hack-and-slash that is marred by clumsy combat, poor dialogue, and some serious technical issues." In Japan, where the PlayStation version was ported and published by Ubisoft on February 9, 2012, Famitsu gave it a score of one six, one seven, one six, and one seven for a total of 26 out of 40.

The Digital Fix gave the Xbox 360 version a score of three out of ten, saying that the game was "being released at a slightly budget price, but the truth is that even at a price approaching zero it would not be a particularly attractive purchase. In a world where the arcade game is no longer in limbo but positively exploding with true bastions of the indie cause, at much cheaper prices, a full price game being a few notes cheaper than a AAA title is no longer a selling point." Metro gave the same Xbox 360 version a score of two out of ten, calling it an "Embarrassingly poor medieval brawler that seems completely oblivious to its own absurdity and incompetence." The A.V. Club gave the same console version a D−, calling it "A game with few redeeming qualities, a dull, pretentious hack-and-slash that fails in almost every way."
