= World Rally Championship (2005 video game) =

2005 video game

WRC: FIA World Rally Championship
- PAL cover art
- Developer: Traveller's Tales
- Publishers: EU: Sony Computer Entertainment; NA: Namco Bandai Games
- Series: WRC
- Platform: PlayStation Portable
- Release: EU: 18 November 2005; JP: 9 March 2006; NA: 18 April 2006
- Genre: Racing
- Mode: Single-player

WRC: FIA World Rally Championship is a racing video game developed by Traveller's Tales and published by Sony Computer Entertainment for the PlayStation Portable. The game features content from the 2005 World Rally Championship, which was also featured on WRC: Rally Evolved.

== Reception ==
Reception

Aggregate score
Aggregator	Score
Metacritic	67/100

Review scores
Publication	Score
Famitsu	28/40
Game Informer	8.75/10
GamePro	3/5
GameSpot	7.5/10
IGN	6.2/10
PlayStation Official Magazine – UK	6/10
Official U.S. PlayStation Magazine	3/5
PALGN	5.5/10
PlayStation: The Official Magazine	6.5/10
PSM3	80%

The game received "average" reviews according to the review aggregation website Metacritic. In Japan, where the game was ported and published by Spike on 9 March 2006, Famitsu gave it a score of all four sevens for a total of 28 out of 40.
