= Speedball 2 Tournament =

2007 video game

- Developer: Kylotonn
- Publisher: Frogster Interactive Pictures
- Platform: Windows
- Release: NA: November 27, 2007; EU: February 8, 2008; AU: March 2008
- Genre: Sports
- Modes: Single-player, multiplayer

Speedball 2 Tournament is a sequel to the Amiga futuristic sports video game Speedball 2: Brutal Deluxe originally created by The Bitmap Brothers. It was developed by Kylotonn for Microsoft Windows and published by Frogster Interactive Pictures in 2007.

== Features ==
The game features fully customizable male, female and droid players, and a virtual marketplace for unlockable in-game content. It also features live streaming of ranked matches, as well as live sports commentary and developer interviews.

The game also features a subscriber-based "Gold" mode in which players are granted access to worldwide officially ranked leagues.

== Development ==
Typical gameplay screenshot

Public interest in a modern remake of Speedball 2 was rekindled by a high-profile Half-Life 2 modification, SourceBall. The SourceBall project began development in November 2004, and garnered interest from both Valve (many of whom claimed to be fans of the original Speedball 2), and from Mike Montgomery of The Bitmap Brothers. SourceBall was featured in a Steam News article broadcast to the Steam community, and was used by Valve in their 2005 presentation at The Gathering in Norway. Following a change of leadership in early 2006, development on the SourceBall project ended, but public demand for a new version of Speedball 2 remained high.

In October 2006, Frogster Interactive secured the rights to remake Speedball 2. For the production of Speedball 2, Kylotonn assembled a new team of game designers and programmers. As eminent advisor and lead producer, Mike Montgomery from Bitmap Brothers was a supervisor in the development of the game. The title was later changed to Speedball 2 Tournament.

== Distribution ==
Frogster Interactive Pictures released the game via Steam in November 2007. The game has since been delisted from Steam, though no official announcement or justification for this seems to have been published.
