= WRC II Extreme =

2002 video game

- European edition cover
- Developer: Evolution Studios
- Publisher: Sony Computer Entertainment
- Series: WRC
- Platform: PlayStation 2
- Release: EU: 27 November 2002; UK: 29 November 2002
- Genre: Racing
- Modes: Single-player, multiplayer

WRC II Extreme (also known as WRC 2002) is a 2002 racing video game developed by Evolution Studios and published by Sony Computer Entertainment for the PlayStation 2.

== Gameplay ==
WRC II Extreme contains 126 stages across 14 different countries with officially licensed WRC cars that are available to the player. An action replay mode is made available which includes a wide range of camera angle shots. All 14 rallies from the official 2002 WRC calendar appear on the game.

21 drivers and 7 teams appear on the game. Although Citroën did not participate in a full season in 2002, they are featured on all events in the game and are therefore eligible to score team points in championship mode. Because Colin McRae had his own video game series at this time, Sony could not acquire the license for him to appear, so he was replaced on the game by François Duval.

== Production ==
WRC II Extreme was developed by British-based Evolution Studios and published by Sony Computer Entertainment. The game was designed with a new physics model for the cars controlled by the player. This was developed with assistance for rally motorsport engineers. The geography of the tracks was modeled after satellite photography and DEM data to create a more realistic and accurate look for each rally stage. Audio samples from the engine noises are based on real-life WRC rally cars. The action replay mode editing was developed with the assistance of World Rally Championship broadcaster Chrysalis TV with the editing of the replay footage and GUI design. Each car is made from around 20,000 polygons, an increase from 8000 in the first game. Robert Reid, co-driver of Richard Burns in the 2002 WRC season is mentioned in the credits, but is not explicitly credited as providing the voice in the English version.

== Reception ==
Reception

Aggregate score
Aggregator	Score
GameRankings	82%

Review scores
Publication	Score
GamesMaster	85%
PlayStation Official Magazine – UK	9/10
Play	85%

WRC II Extreme received "favorable" reviews according to the review aggregation website GameRankings. The Evening Herald wrote that the game was "a dizzying rollercoaster ride" and called it "more fun than Colin McRae 3". Nick Gillett of The Guardian wrote that the handling model was "fussy, skittish" and described the game as "Wholly Superfluous."
