= World Rally Championship (2001 video game) =

2001 video game

- PAL cover art
- Developer: Evolution Studios
- Publishers: EU: Sony Computer Entertainment; NA: BAM! Entertainment
- Series: WRC
- Platform: PlayStation 2
- Release: EU: 30 November 2001; NA: 21 March 2002
- Genre: Racing
- Modes: Single-player, multiplayer

World Rally Championship (also known as WRC and WRC 2001) is a racing video game developed by Evolution Studios and published by Sony Computer Entertainment for the PlayStation 2. It is the first rallying game to be officially licensed by the FIA World Rally Championship and is based on the 2001 season.

== Features ==
WRC features 21 drivers representing 7 teams and all 14 venues from the season. Game modes feature quick rally, single rally, championship and time trial. Each car is made from around 8000 polygons.

== Development ==
Robert Reid, co-driver of Richard Burns in the 2001 WRC season is mentioned in the credits, but is not explicitly credited as providing the voice in the English version.

== Reception ==
Reception

Aggregate score
Aggregator	Score
Metacritic	80/100

Review scores
Publication	Score
Edge	7/10
EP Daily	7.5/10
Famitsu	35/40
Game Informer	7.5/10
GameSpot	8.5/10
GameSpy	81%
GameZone	8.5/10
IGN	8.7/10
Official U.S. PlayStation Magazine	5/5
PlayStation: The Official Magazine	8/10
FHM	4/5

World Rally Championship received "favorable" reviews according to the review aggregation website Metacritic. In Japan, where the game was ported and published by Spike on 14 March 2002, Famitsu gave it a score of 35 out of 40. Four-Eyed Dragon of GamePro said, "If you've ever wondered what the heck rally racing is all about or if you're a true fan of the extreme sport, play World Rally Championship—it's as close as you'll get to the real thing." (Note: GamePro gave the game 4.5/5 for graphics, two 4/5 scores for sound and fun factor, and 3.5/5 for control.)

GameSpot named it the second-best PlayStation 2 game of April 2002.

== See also ==
- List of World Rally Championship video games
