= Crown Wars: The Black Prince =

2024 video game

- Developer: Artefacts Studio
- Publisher: Nacon
- Platforms: PlayStation 5; Windows; Xbox Series X/S
- Release: WW: May 23, 2024
- Genres: Turn-based tactics, tactical role-playing game
- Mode: Single-player

Crown Wars: The Black Prince is a 2024 turn-based tactics video game developed by Artefacts Studio and published by Nacon. Players battle a cult that is attempting to use the Hundred Years' War for its own purposes.

== Gameplay ==
During the Hundred Years' War, a secret society uses black magic to influence the conflict. Players control a French noble who attempts to stop the cultists. Besides the cultists, there are five other factions: the French, led by Charles V of France; the English, led by Edward III of England and commanded by Edward the Black Prince; the Bretons, who are divided between French and English supporters; the Navarrese, led by Charles II of Navarre; and the Castilians, who use prototypes of firearms but face civil war.

Players must build up their forces, train them, and send them out in turn-based and tactical battles. Weapon types can have unique properties. For example, characters attacking with halberds can strike multiple opponents, and characters can bypass armor when attacking with a longsword. There are six character classes, and recruited characters can be customized through skill trees. Players can upgrade their castle in a strategic layer similar to XCOM. Quests and the campaign are procedurally generated and have time limits. Players must take into consideration how long missions will stay available when sending their squads on the map. Some characters may also not be available, as they heal from their injuries.

== Development ==
Developer Artefacts Studio is based in France. Nacon released Crown Wars: The Black Prince for Windows, PlayStation 5, and Xbox Series X/S on May 23, 2024. The Switch version is planned for release in December 2024.

== Reception ==
On Metacritic, Crown Wars: The Black Prince received mixed reviews on all platforms. After playing a review in January 2022, TechRadar criticized the voice acting, keybinding, and limited number of animations. However, they enjoyed the strategic elements and praised the premise, which they said was a solid base. Digitally Downloaded felt that Crown Wars mostly ignored the Hundred Years' War and instead was a generic XCOM clone with a medieval skin. They said they eventually felt exhausted by the long quests, and they failed to connect to the game itself in part because of what they said was poor voice acting. GamingBolt called the gameplay "a lot of fun" but felt it is let down by a poor story and bad voice acting.
