= WRC 8 =

Official game of the 2019 World Rally Championship

- Game cover featuring Toyota Yaris WRC
- Developer: Kylotonn
- Publisher: Bigben Interactive
- Series: World Rally Championship
- Platforms: Microsoft Windows; PlayStation 4; Xbox One; Nintendo Switch
- Release: WW: 10 September 2019
- Genre: Racing
- Modes: Single-player, multiplayer

WRC 8, also known as WRC 8 FIA World Rally Championship, is the official game of the 2019 World Rally Championship. The game was developed by French developer Kylotonn and published on 10 September 2019 by Bigben Interactive for Microsoft Windows, PlayStation 4, Xbox One and Nintendo Switch. The game carries an official World Rally Championship esports licence.

== Development and release ==
WRC 8 was revealed as the official game of the 2019 FIA World Rally Championship in February 2019. It features dynamic weather and an entirely redesigned career mode reminiscent of Codemasters' Formula One series. The game also sees the addition of new classic cars, much like its main rival, Codemasters' Colin McRae Rally/DiRT series, including the Lancia Stratos and Renault Alpine. The game also offers more content than the previous game, with 102 special stages spread across the championship's 14 countries. The game was released to Microsoft Windows, PlayStation 4 and Xbox One in September 2019, and was later ported to Nintendo Switch on 31 October.

== Reception ==
Reception

Aggregate score
Aggregator	Score
Metacritic	PC: 77/100; PS4: 79/100; XONE: 76/100; NS: 61/100

Review scores
Publication	Score
4Players	77%
Hardcore Gamer	4/5
IGN	8.4/10

WRC 8 received "generally favorable" reviews, according to video game review aggregator website Metacritic, with reviewers praising the major improvements made to both the game's physics and graphics.

Martin Robinson of Eurogamer praised the ongoing evolution of the series, saying that "it's a significant year for the series, having taken a year away and returning from its break revitalised and refreshed. In fact, having personally only kept a watching brief on Kylotonn's tenure on the series since it signed up with WRC 5, it feels like a different series entirely."

=== Accolades ===
The game was nominated for "Best Game" at the Pégases Awards 2020.
