= Taxi Life =

2024 vehicle simulation game

- Cover art
- Developer: Simteract
- Publisher: Nacon
- Engine: Unreal Engine 5
- Platforms: PlayStation 5; Windows; Xbox Series X/S
- Release: 7 March 2024
- Genre: Vehicle simulation
- Mode: Single-player

Taxi Life: A City Driving Simulator is a vehicle simulation game developed by Simteract and published by Nacon. It was released for PlayStation 5, Windows and Xbox Series X/S on 7 March 2024.

== Gameplay ==
The game set in Barcelona, featuring a scale of 1:1 recreation of the city. The classic London black cab is also available in the game as a downloadable content.

== Development and release ==
Taxi Life was announced in March 2022, initially known as Urban Venture. It was developed by a Polish video game developer Simteract and published by Nacon. The game was originally scheduled to be released in February 2024, but it was postponed to 7 March 2024 for PlayStation 5, Windows and Xbox Series X/S platforms.

== Reception ==
Reception

Aggregate score
Aggregator	Score
Metacritic	PC: 51/100; PS5: 56/100; XSXS: 55/100

Review scores
Publication	Score
Push Square	3/10 stars
Shacknews	4/10

Taxi Life received "mixed or average" reviews according to review aggregator Metacritic.

=== Sales ===
As of October 2024, the game has reached 200,000 players.
