= Women's Republican Council =

- Formation: 1987
- Type: NGO
- Headquarters: Moscovyan 35, 375002 Yerevan
- Location: Armenia

The Women's Republican Council (WRC) is a women's NGO in Armenia. There are 83 community chapters in Armenia. The Chairwomen for the organization is Nora Hakopyan.

== History ==
Though initially implemented as a conference in 1987 and again in 1991, the organization became first established when it was registered with the Ministry of Justice (Armenia) in 1992. In 1995, WRC, with the help of UNDP assistance, began participating in international conferences on Women's rights including the International Beijing Conference

== Partners ==
WRC lists the following partners:

- UNDP
- UNICEF
- UNFPA
- WFP
- Eurasia Foundation
- International Foundation for Electoral Systems
- USAID
- Marmacash
- Oxfam
- AED
- Equality Now
- NDI
- IWRAW
- WEDO
