= Evolution Studios =

British video game developer

Evolution Studios Ltd.
- Final logo used from 2012 to 2016
- Type: Subsidiary
- Industry: Video games
- Founded: 1999; 27 years ago
- Founder: Martin Kenwright; Ian Hetherington; Mick Hocking
- Defunct: 2016; 10 years ago
- Successor: Codemasters Cheshire
- Headquarters: Runcorn, Cheshire, England
- Products: World Rally Championship series MotorStorm series Driveclub
- Number of employees: about 60
- Parent: SIE Worldwide Studios (2007–2016)

Evolution Studios Ltd. was a British video game developer based in Runcorn, Cheshire. The company was founded in 1999 by Martin Kenwright and Ian Hetherington, following the purchase of their studio Digital Image Design's publisher Ocean Software by Infogrames. Kenwright then left Digital Image Design with six members of staff to form Evolution Studios.

== Company history ==
Then based in Frodsham, Cheshire, it developed a racing demo on PC, depicting multiple rally cars racing on a circuit with cockpit views, which was subsequently picked up by Sony as it was interested in a PlayStation 2 game based on the World Rally Championship licence.

Both Evolution and its satellite studio, Bigbig Studios, in Warwickshire were acquired by Sony Computer Entertainment in September 2007. At this point, Kenwright and Hetherington left the company, with its co-founder Mick Hocking taking over, running Evolution, Bigbig and Studio Liverpool as Group Studio Director. Hocking was subsequently promoted to Vice President of the Studio Group in April 2011.

The developer's last game was Driveclub. It was scheduled as a PlayStation 4 launch title, although it was ultimately delayed, until October 2014. It claims it had trademarked the name of the game almost 10 years ago, but were waiting for the technology to create its vision of the game.

On 23 March 2015, 55 staff members were cut from Evolution Studio, which sources say is approximately half of the studio. The redundancies have been described by Sony as a way to focus the studio on developing Driveclub as a service. On 22 March 2016, Sony announced that Evolution Studios was closed.

On 11 April 2016, the development team joined Codemasters as Codemasters EVO, which would be renamed as Codemasters Cheshire. After the disappointing sales of its next game Onrush, several members of the Codemasters Cheshire development division were let go in redundancies, including game director Paul Rustchynsky, and the division was shifted to a support role for other Codemasters titles. In May 2022, the team at Codemasters Cheshire was merged into Criterion Games, an EA subsidiary.

== Games developed ==
Year	Game	Platform(s)	GameRankings	Metacritic	Notes
2001	World Rally Championship	PlayStation 2	81.33%	80/100	
2002	WRC II Extreme	PlayStation 2	82.33%	—N/a	
2003	WRC 3	PlayStation 2	79.38%	—N/a	
2004	WRC 4	PlayStation 2	81.86%	—N/a	
2005	WRC: Rally Evolved	PlayStation 2	79.81%	—N/a	
2006	MotorStorm	PlayStation 3	82.43%	84/100	
2008	MotorStorm: Pacific Rift	PlayStation 3	82.49%	82/100	
2011	MotorStorm: Apocalypse	PlayStation 3	78.34%	77/100	
2012	MotorStorm: RC	PlayStation 3, PlayStation Vita	78.35%	78/100	
2014	Driveclub	PlayStation 4	70.72%	71/100	
