= WRC 2: FIA World Rally Championship =

2011 video game

- Cover art featuring a Mini Cooper
- Developer: Milestone srl
- Publishers: EU: Black Bean Games; NA: Plug In Digital; JP: Cyberfront
- Series: World Rally Championship
- Platforms: Microsoft Windows; PlayStation 3 Xbox 360
- Release: EU: October 14, 2011; JP: February 16, 2012 (PS3, X360); NA: April 24, 2013 (PC)
- Genre: Racing
- Modes: Single-player, Multiplayer

WRC 2: FIA World Rally Championship (also known as WRC 2, WRC 2 FIA World Rally Championship 2 and WRC: FIA World Rally Championship 2011) is the official racing video game of the 2011 FIA World Rally Championship. It was developed by Milestone srl and features improved details, visuals and new modes to be the most realistic rally simulation. The game was released for PlayStation 3, Xbox 360 and Microsoft Windows in Europe on October 14, 2011, and in North America on April 24, 2013 (Windows only).

The game features six-stage championships, special timed challenge stages, and 16-player online modes. There is a revamped Career mode, which encourages more team management and has new recruitment features.

== Gameplay ==
The single-player mode features many options like Single Stage Mode, Single Rally Mode, Championship Mode, Time Attack Mode, Career Mode and WRC Rally School. This is where the player can compete with AI's or with his own ghosts to improve driving skills. Vehicles sustain damage according to player's driving on tracks and behaves accordingly. There are total 90 stages in 15 locations to compete upon in single player mode. Per the calendar, Rally Bulgaria and Rally Japan were removed from the previous game, while Acropolis Rally and Rally Australia were added.

The multiplayer option is available for 16 player online gaming. Race types available are Single Stage, Championship, Single Rally, and Super Special Stage.

== Reception ==
Reception

Aggregate score
| Aggregator | Score | |
| Aggregator | PS3 | Xbox 360 |
|---|---|---|
| Metacritic | 64/100 | 65/100 |

Review scores
| Publication | Score | |
| Publication | PS3 | Xbox 360 |
|---|---|---|
| Eurogamer | N/A | 6/10 |
| Famitsu | 28/40 | 28/40 |
| GamesMaster | N/A | 65% |
| GameSpot | 5.5/10 | 5.5/10 |
| GamesTM | N/A | 6/10 |
| IGN | 5.5/10 | 5.5/10 |
| PlayStation Official Magazine – Australia | 7/10 | N/A |
| PlayStation Official Magazine – UK | 6/10 | N/A |
| Official Xbox Magazine (UK) | N/A | 7/10 |
| VideoGamer.com | 6/10 | 6/10 |
| Digital Spy | N/A | 3/5 |

The game received "mixed or average" reviews according to the review aggregation website Metacritic. The consensus was that it was "a pretty decent rally game, but lacks finishing touches especially with graphics and audio. The driving model regarding feedback could be also more refined". The PlayStation 3 version got to number 23 in the UK sales charts. In Japan, where the game was ported and published by CyberFront on February 16, 2012, Famitsu gave the PS3 and Xbox 360 versions a score of two sevens, one eight, and one six for a total of 28 out of 40.
