= Kylotonn =

French video game development studio

Kylotonn SARL
- Type: Subsidiary
- Industry: Video games
- Founded: 2006; 20 years ago
- Founders: Roman Vincent; Yann Tambellini
- Headquarters: Paris, France
- Key people: Roman Vincent; Yann Tambellini
- Number of employees: 148 (as of May 2021)
- Parent: Nacon (2018–present)
- Divisions: KT Racing
- Website: www.kylotonn.com

Kylotonn SARL is a French video game development studio founded in 2006 in Paris. It is best known for its racing games, and were the official developer of the World Rally Championship video game series from 2015 to 2023.

== History ==
4X Studio was founded in 2002 as a subsidiary of 4X Technologies. After releasing only one game under that name, Iron Storm, it closed and later reformed by Roman Vincent and Yann Tambellini as Kylotonn in 2006.

In 2012, Kylotonn developed the Play All technology with Wizarbox and Darkworks.

In 2014, the studio launched the KT Racing label.

In 2015, the company opened a facility in Lyon, Kylotonn Racing Games.

In 2017, the company won the 2017 Ping Award for "Best Sports Game" for WRC 7.

On 2 October 2018, French publisher Nacon (formerly Bigben Interactive) announced that it had acquired Kylotonn. Kylotonn and Bigben had previously collaborated with each other since 2008.

=== Insolvency and financial difficulties ===
In February 2026, parent company Nacon filed for insolvency, after being unable to make repayments to bondholders. This caused three subsidiaries, including Kylotonn, to individually file for insolvency.

The French union STJV reported Nacon's intentions to continue with mass layoffs at the company, before postponing the meeting scheduled for the announcement. This followed the formation of a new team within Nacon made up of former Kylotonn employees, known as Grit Games, who hold the official license to develop games for the FIA World Rally Championship until 2032.

== Games ==
=== As 4X Studio ===
Year	Title	Platform(s)	Publisher
2002	Iron Storm	Windows	Wanadoo Edition

=== As Kylotonn ===
Year	Title	Platform(s)	Publisher
2005	Bet On Soldier: Blood Sport	Windows	Brigades
2006	Bet On Soldier: Black-out Saigon	Windows	Eclypse
2006	Bet On Soldier: Blood of Sahara	Windows	Brigades
2007	Speedball 2: Tournament	Windows	FIP Publishing
2009	Little Folk of Faery	Windows	Orange France
2009	My Body Coach	Wii	Neko Entertainment
2011	Hunter's Trophy	Windows, PlayStation 3	Bigben Interactive
2011	The Cursed Crusade	Windows, Xbox 360	DTP Entertainment
2011	My Body Coach 2: Fitness & Dance	PlayStation 3, Wii	Neko Entertainment
2012	Hunter's Trophy 2: Europa	Windows, PlayStation 3, Wii U, Xbox 360	Bigben Interactive
2013	Hidden Path of Faery	Windows	Rondomedia
2013	Hunter's Trophy 2: America	Windows, PlayStation 3, Xbox 360	Bigben Interactive
2013	Hunter's Trophy 2: Australia	Windows, PlayStation 3, Xbox 360	Bigben Interactive
2013	Truck Racer	Windows, PlayStation 3, Xbox 360	Bigben Interactive
2014	Motorcycle Club	Windows, PlayStation 3, PlayStation 4	Bigben Interactive
2015	WRC 5	Windows, PlayStation 3, PlayStation 4, PlayStation Vita, Xbox 360, Xbox One	Bigben Interactive
2016	WRC 6	Windows, PlayStation 4, Xbox One	Bigben Interactive
2017	FlatOut 4: Total Insanity	Windows, PlayStation 4, Xbox One	Bigben Interactive
2017	WRC 7	Windows, PlayStation 4, Xbox One	Bigben Interactive
2018	Isle of Man TT: Ride on the Edge	Windows, Nintendo Switch, PlayStation 4, Xbox One	Bigben Interactive
2018	V-Rally 4	Windows, Nintendo Switch, PlayStation 4, Xbox One	Bigben Interactive
2019	WRC 8	Windows, Nintendo Switch, PlayStation 4, Xbox One	Bigben Interactive
2020	Isle of Man TT: Ride on the Edge 2	Windows, Nintendo Switch, PlayStation 4, Xbox One	Nacon
2020	WRC 9	Windows, Nintendo Switch, PlayStation 4, PlayStation 5, Xbox One, Xbox Series X/S	Nacon
2021	WRC 10	Windows, Nintendo Switch (March 2022), PlayStation 4, PlayStation 5, Xbox One, Xbox Series X/S	Nacon
2022	WRC Generations	Windows, Nintendo Switch (December 2022), PlayStation 4, PlayStation 5, Xbox One, Xbox Series X/S	Nacon
2024	Test Drive Unlimited Solar Crown	Windows, PlayStation 5, Xbox Series X/S	Nacon
2027	Endurance Motorsport Series	Windows, PlayStation 5, Xbox Series X/S	Nacon
