= WRC 3: FIA World Rally Championship =

2012 video game

- Cover art featuring a Mini Cooper
- Developer: Milestone srl
- Publishers: EU: Milestone srl; NA: Bandai Namco Entertainment
- Series: World Rally Championship
- Platforms: PlayStation 3 PlayStation Vita; Microsoft Windows; Xbox 360; OnLive
- Release: EU: 12 October 2012; AU: 13 December 2012 (PS3, X360); JP: 31 January 2013 (PS3, Vita); NA: 26 March 2013 (PS3, Vita); NA: 23 April 2013 (PC)
- Genre: Racing
- Modes: Single-player, Multiplayer

WRC 3: FIA World Rally Championship (also known as WRC 3, WRC 3: FIA World Rally Championship 3 and 2012 FIA World Rally Championship) is a racing video game by Italian developer Milestone srl. Launched in October 2012, it has the official licence of the 2012 World Rally Championship season. The game is available on Microsoft Windows desktop computers, the Xbox 360, PlayStation 3 and PlayStation Vita consoles, and the OnLive cloud gaming service.

== Reception ==
The game received "mixed or average" reviews according to the review aggregation website Metacritic. The PlayStation 3 version got to number 14 in the UK sales charts. In Japan, where the game was ported and published by CyberFront on 31 January 2013, Famitsu gave it a score of one eight and three sevens for the PS3 version, and all four sevens for the Vita version.

Reception

Aggregate score
| Aggregator | Score | | | |
| Aggregator | PC | PS Vita | PS3 | Xbox 360 |
|---|---|---|---|---|
| Metacritic | 61/100 | N/A | 63/100 | 62/100 |

Review scores
| Publication | Score | | | |
| Publication | PC | PS Vita | PS3 | Xbox 360 |
|---|---|---|---|---|
| Eurogamer | N/A | N/A | N/A | 6/10 |
| Famitsu | N/A | 28/40 | 29/40 | N/A |
| Game Informer | N/A | N/A | 7.75/10 | N/A |
| GameRevolution | N/A | N/A | 2/5 | N/A |
| GamesMaster | N/A | N/A | N/A | 68% |
| GameSpot | 6/10 | N/A | N/A | N/A |
| IGN | 5/10 | N/A | 5/10 | 5/10 |
| PlayStation Official Magazine – UK | N/A | N/A | 6/10 | N/A |
| Official Xbox Magazine (UK) | N/A | N/A | N/A | 5/10 |
| PC Gamer (UK) | 56% | N/A | N/A | N/A |
| The Digital Fix | N/A | N/A | 5/10 | N/A |
