= WRC 6 =

2016 video game

- European edition cover art
- Developer: Kylotonn
- Publisher: Bigben Interactive
- Director: Alain Jarniou
- Series: World Rally Championship
- Platforms: PlayStation 4; Windows; Xbox One
- Release: WW: 7 October 2016
- Genre: Racing
- Modes: Single-player, multiplayer

WRC 6, also known as WRC 6 FIA World Rally Championship, is a racing video game based on the 2016 World Rally Championship season. The game was developed by French developer Kylotonn and published in October 2016 by Bigben Interactive for PlayStation 4, Windows, and Xbox One. It is the first WRC video game under Kylotonn banner not to feature Mitsubishi and Subaru Rally Cars and also first under Kylotonn banner not released on seventh generation consoles.

The game features licensed cars and rallies from the 2016 WRC season. The Toyota Yaris WRC Test car was made available as a pre-order DLC for the game. It marks the first video game under Kylotonn banner to feature Toyota vehicles.

== Reception ==
Reception

Aggregate score
Aggregator	Score
Metacritic	PC: 66/100; PS4: 66/100; XONE: 68/100

Review scores
Publication	Score
GamesMaster	79%
GamesRadar+	70%
IGN	71%

IGN said "it's an earnest attempt to capture the spirit of a niche motorsport series and, most importantly, it feels good to play thanks to a wide selection of tight-quarters race tracks, and decent handling. It might not hold a candle to Dirt Rally in its car selection or look and feel, but it's not bad for developer Kylotonn's sophomore effort on the series." GamesRadar said "The second best rally game on current-gen, after Dirt Rally. A straining game engine is its biggest issue, but accept its few shortcomings and you'll find a fun and engrossing rally sim."
