= WRC 3 =

2003 video game

- European cover art
- Developer: Evolution Studios
- Publisher: Sony Computer Entertainment
- Series: WRC
- Platform: PlayStation 2
- Release: EU: 21 November 2003
- Genre: Racing
- Modes: Single-player, multiplayer

WRC 3: The Official Game of the FIA World Rally Championship (also known as WRC 2003) is a 2003 racing video game developed by Evolution Studios and published by Sony Computer Entertainment for the PlayStation 2. It was released by Spike in Japan.

== Gameplay ==
WRC 3 features 17 drivers from 7 teams. Although Mitsubishi did not participate full-time in the championship this season, they appear on every event in the game and are therefore eligible to score team points in championship mode. Likewise, Hyundai appeared in each event despite withdrawing from the championship in real life towards the end of the season. All 14 rallies from the official 2003 WRC calendar appear on the game.

== Reception ==
Reception

Aggregate score
| Aggregator | Score |
|---|---|
| Metacritic | 70/100 |

Review scores
| Publication | Score |
|---|---|
| Computer and Video Games | 7/10 |
| Edge | 6/10 |
| Eurogamer | 6/10 |
| Famitsu | 32/40 |

The game received "mixed" reviews according to the review aggregation website Metacritic. In Japan, Famitsu gave it a score of one eight, one nine, one seven, and one eight for a total of 32 out of 40.
