= WRC 4: FIA World Rally Championship =

2013 racing video game

- Developer: Milestone
- Publishers: EU/NA: Bigben Interactive; JP: Square Enix
- Designer: Alex Zucca
- Series: World Rally Championship
- Platforms: Microsoft Windows, Xbox 360, PlayStation 3, PlayStation Vita
- Release: EU: October 25, 2013; JP: July 24, 2014 (PS3, Vita); NA: July 29, 2014 (PS3, Vita)
- Genre: Racing
- Modes: Single-player, Multiplayer

WRC 4: FIA World Rally Championship is the official racing video game of the 2013 World Rally Championship season. It was developed by Milestone, and is the most recent WRC Videogame to be developed by Milestone. WRC 4 was released in Europe on 25 October 2013.

Per the calendar, Rally New Zealand was removed from the previous game, while Rallye Deutschland and Rally Mexico both had revised routes.

== Reception ==
The game had mixed reviews. The general consensus is that "the career mode is a lot of fun and the tracks are varied. On the other hand, the game lacks challenge, has an overabundance of loading times and disappoints audiovisually." It got to number 21 in the UK sales charts.

Reception

Aggregate score
Aggregator	Score
Metacritic	PC: 64/100; X360: 62/100; PS3: 63/100

Review scores
Publication	Score
Eurogamer	60%
GameSpot	6/10
IGN	80%
PlayStation Official Magazine – Australia	65%
PlayStation Official Magazine – UK	5/10
Official Xbox Magazine (UK)	70%
