= WRC (video game series) =

Official video games of World Rally Championship

World Rally Championship
- Alternate series logo by EA Sports
- Genre: Racing
- Developers: Evolution Studios (2001–2005); Unique Development Studios (2002); Traveller's Tales (2005); Milestone (2010–2013); Firebrand Games (2014); Kylotonn Games (2015–2022); Codemasters (2023–2025)
- Publishers: Sony Computer Entertainment (2001–2005); Black Bean Games (2010–2012); Nacon (2013–2022; 2027); EA Sports (2023–2025)
- Platforms: Android; Microsoft Windows; Nintendo 3DS; Nintendo Switch; PlayStation; PlayStation 2; PlayStation 3; PlayStation 4; PlayStation 5; PlayStation Portable; PlayStation Vita; Xbox 360; Xbox One; Xbox Series X/S
- First release: World Rally Championship; 30 November 2001
- Latest release: EA Sports WRC; 3 November 2023

WRC, short for World Rally Championship, is a rally racing video game series. Licensed from the World Rally Championship organization, games in the series through the years were developed by various studios under several publishers.

To date, a total of seventeen main games and four spin-offs have been released. The most recent main series title EA Sports WRC was developed by Codemasters and published by EA Sports on 3 November 2023. The EA, who had acquired Codemasters in 2021, decided to suspend further development of the series in April 2025, leading to the WRC organization licensing the rights to further WRC games to Nacon from 2027 to 2032.

== History ==
The first series was published by Sony Computer Entertainment who owned the WRC license in the early 2000s. These titles were all made by British developer Evolution Studios between 2001 and 2005. The series consists of five original games released exclusively for the Sony PlayStation 2 console, and one port for the Sony handheld PSP, all based on the World Rally Championship seasons from 2001 to 2005, using official drivers, cars and locations.

The license then remained dormant until 2009 when Italian publisher Black Bean Games signed a four-year licensing contract. The second series then followed, which included five games published by Black Bean Games and developed by Italian developer Milestone between 2010 and 2013. These included four official WRC games based on seasons from 2010 to 2013, as well as a licensed arcade title, all of them released for Microsoft Windows, PlayStation 3 and Xbox 360.

In July 2013 the license was picked up by the French publisher Bigben Interactive. Bigben hired Paris-based developer Kylotonn to work on the third series of games, which started in 2015 with WRC 5 and continued with WRC 6 in 2016, WRC 7 in 2017 and WRC 8 in 2019, based on the 2015, 2016, 2017 and 2019 World Rally Championship seasons. All four were released for Microsoft Windows, PlayStation 4 and Xbox One. A port of WRC was released for Android titled WRC The Official Game on Play Store on 4 December 2014.

WRC Promoter GmbH extended its licensing agreement with game developer Kylotonn until 2022, with WRC 9, WRC 10 and WRC Generations all released on the 9th console generation Xbox Series X and PlayStation 5 platforms.

Codemasters acquired the exclusive license for WRC games in 2020, to start for games in 2023 and for five years after, with its planned first game to be released in 2024. EA Sports were put in charge of a partnership with Codemasters after the latter's acquisition by Electronic Arts in 2021. On April 30, 2025, it was announced that Codemasters had stopped development on future WRC titles, with EA Sports WRC being the last under the license.

The World Rally Championship announced in May 2025 that they licensed the rights to WRC video games to Nacon, who will create a complete reboot of the series with the first game planned in 2027.

== Games ==
=== Main titles ===
Titles in the World Rally Championship series
Title	Release	PC	6th Gen	7th Gen	8th Gen	9th Gen	Handheld	Developer	Notes
World Rally Championship	2001	—N/a	PS2	—N/a	—N/a	—N/a	—N/a	Evolution Studios	Based on the 2001 WRC season
WRC II Extreme	2002	—N/a	PS2	—N/a	—N/a	—N/a	—N/a	Evolution Studios	Based on the 2002 WRC season
WRC 3	2003	—N/a	PS2	—N/a	—N/a	—N/a	—N/a	Evolution Studios	Based on the 2003 WRC season
WRC 4	2004	—N/a	PS2	—N/a	—N/a	—N/a	—N/a	Evolution Studios	Based on the 2004 WRC season
WRC: Rally Evolved	2005	—N/a	PS2	—N/a	—N/a	—N/a	—N/a	Evolution Studios	Based on the 2005 WRC season
WRC FIA World Rally Championship	2010	Windows	—N/a	PS3, X360	—N/a	—N/a	—N/a	Milestone	Based on the 2010 WRC season
WRC 2: FIA World Rally Championship	2011	Windows	—N/a	PS3, X360	—N/a	—N/a	—N/a	Milestone	Based on the 2011 WRC season
WRC 3: FIA World Rally Championship	2012	Windows	—N/a	PS3, X360, OnLive	—N/a	—N/a	Vita	Milestone	Based on the 2012 WRC season
WRC 4: FIA World Rally Championship	2013	Windows	—N/a	PS3, X360	—N/a	—N/a	Vita	Milestone	Based on the 2013 WRC season
WRC 5	2015	Windows	—N/a	PS3, X360	PS4, Xbox One	—N/a	Vita	Kylotonn	Based on the 2015 WRC season
WRC 6	2016	Windows	—N/a	—N/a	PS4, Xbox One	—N/a	—N/a	Kylotonn	Based on the 2016 WRC season
WRC 7	2017	Windows	—N/a	—N/a	PS4, Xbox One	—N/a	—N/a	Kylotonn	Based on the 2017 WRC season
WRC 8	2019	Windows	—N/a	—N/a	PS4, Xbox One	—N/a	Nintendo Switch	Kylotonn	Based on the 2019 WRC season
WRC 9	2020	Windows	—N/a	—N/a	PS4, Xbox One	PS5, Xbox Series X/S	Nintendo Switch	Kylotonn	Based on the 2020 WRC season
WRC 10	2021	Windows	—N/a	—N/a	PS4, Xbox One	PS5, Xbox Series X/S	Nintendo Switch	Kylotonn	Based on the 2021 WRC season
WRC Generations	2022	Windows	—N/a	—N/a	PS4, Xbox One	PS5, Xbox Series X/S	Nintendo Switch	Kylotonn	Based on the 2022 WRC season
EA Sports WRC	2023	Windows	—N/a	—N/a	—N/a	PS5, Xbox Series X/S	—N/a	Codemasters	Based on the 2023 and 2024 WRC seasons

=== Spin-offs ===
Title	Release	PC	5th Gen	7th Gen	Handheld	Developer	Notes
WRC: FIA World Rally Championship Arcade	2002	—N/a	PS1	—N/a	—N/a	Unique Development Studios	Based on the 2002 WRC season
World Rally Championship	2005	—N/a	—N/a	—N/a	PSP	Traveller's Tales	Based on the 2005 WRC season
WRC Powerslide	2013	Windows	—N/a	PS3, X360	—N/a	Milestone	Based on the 2013 WRC season
WRC: FIA World Rally Championship	2014	—N/a	—N/a	—N/a	3DS, iOS, Android	Firebrand Games	Based on the 2014 WRC season

== Release history ==
Release timeline
2001	World Rally Championship (2001)
2002	WRC: FIA World Rally Championship Arcade
2002	WRC II Extreme
2003	WRC 3
2004	WRC 4
2005	WRC: Rally Evolved
2005	WRC: FIA World Rally Championship (2005)
2006
2007
2008
2009
2010	WRC: FIA World Rally Championship (2010)
2011	WRC 2: FIA World Rally Championship
2012	WRC 3: FIA World Rally Championship
2013	WRC Powerslide
2013	WRC 4: FIA World Rally Championship
2014	WRC: FIA World Rally Championship (2014)
2015	WRC 5
2016	WRC 6
2017	WRC 7
2018
2019	WRC 8
2020	WRC 9
2021	WRC 10
2022	WRC Generations
2023	EA Sports WRC

=== World Rally Championship (2001) ===
World Rally Championship was released for PlayStation 2 on 30 November 2001 in Europe and 21 March 2002 in North America. The game features FIA licensed cars, stages and drivers from the 2001 season and has a career mode allowing the player to work through the World Rally Championship season. The game also features damage simulation in the form of visual damage as well as performance damage if the player crashes.

=== WRC II Extreme (2002) ===
WRC II Extreme is the sequel to WRC World Rally Championship and was released for PlayStation 2 on 27 November 2002 in Europe, and 24 April 2003 in Japan. It contains teams, drivers, cars and rallies from the 2002 WRC season. It also includes "extreme" cars designed by the teams. The main soundtrack to WRC II Extreme was produced by the Chemical Brothers. Additionally, the tracks "Come with Us/The Test" and "Star Guitar" from the Chemical Brothers album, Come with Us (2002) were also used in the game.

=== WRC 3 (2003) ===
WRC 3 is the second sequel to WRC World Rally Championship and was released for PlayStation 2 on 21 November 2003 in Europe, and 27 May 2004 in Japan. It contains teams, drivers, cars and rallies from the 2003 WRC season. It also contains Extreme and Concept cars, designed by the teams.

=== WRC 4 (2004) ===
WRC 4 is the fourth installment of the WRC World Rally Championship series and was released on 22 October 2004 in Europe and 7 April 2005 in Japan. It contains teams, drivers, cars and rallies from the 2004 WRC season. It also contains Extreme cars designed by the teams, S1600 cars and Group N4 cars.

=== WRC: Rally Evolved (2005) ===
WRC: Rally Evolved or WRC5 is the last of the series for the PS2. It was released exclusively in Europe on 28 October 2005. The game includes teams, drivers, cars and rallies from the 2005 WRC season. It also contains Extreme and Concept cars designed by the teams, S1600 cars and Group B cars from the 1980s.

=== World Rally Championship (2005) ===
In 2005, British game studio Traveller's Tales and SCEE developed a new WRC title for the PlayStation Portable based on WRC: Rally Evolved, which had recently been released on the PS2. The PSP port was jointly released by Sony Computer Entertainment (EU), Spike (JP) and Namco Bandai Games (NA) on 18 November 2005 in Europe, 9 March 2006 in Japan, and 18 April in North America. It is known as WRC, WRC: FIA World Rally Championship and World Rally Championship in the UK, Japan and the US, respectively.

Like its predecessor, World Rally Championship is based around the 2005 season and features 30 fully deformable 2005 WRC, Evolution and Extreme spec cars. In championship mode, players have the opportunity to play through the entire WRC season as any one of the 17 official 2004 registered drivers from the six official manufacturers, participating in 16 official rallies spanning five continents and 16 countries. Additionally, there are 19 bonus stages and downloadable content that was available to users. In addition to championship mode, there are also quick rally, time trial and single rally single-player game modes. World Rally Championship also supports various ad hoc multiplayer modes, such as wireless time trial, turn-based time trial, turn-based single rally, and turn-based championship.

However, unlike the PS2 version, the PSP remake does not include damage simulation, though visual damage to the vehicle can be seen.

=== WRC FIA World Rally Championship (2010) ===
WRC FIA World Rally Championship was released on 8 October 2010 in Europe and 14 April 2011 in Japan. It was the first game to be officially licensed by the WRC since 2005's WRC: Rally Evolved, and is also the first official WRC game to be released on Xbox and PC. It features the official cars, drivers and co-drivers from the 2010 season and from the three support classes: Production World Rally Championship, Super 2000 World Rally Championship and Junior World Rally Championship.

A downloadable car pack, featuring Group B rally cars from the 1980s, was released on the day of the game's release.

=== WRC 2: FIA World Rally Championship (2011) ===
WRC 2: FIA World Rally Championship was released on the PlayStation 3, Xbox 360 and PC on 14 October 2011 in Europe and 16 February 2012 in Japan. It is the second installment in Milestone's rebooted WRC series and is the official video game of the 2011 FIA World Rally Championship, featuring cars and rallies from the 2011 season, including support categories.

=== WRC 3: FIA World Rally Championship (2012) ===
WRC 3: FIA World Rally Championship was released on the PlayStation 3, PlayStation Vita, Xbox 360 and PC on 12 October 2012 in Europe. It is the third installment in Milestone's rebooted WRC series and is the official video game of the 2012 FIA World Rally Championship, featuring cars and rallies from the 2012 season, including support categories.

=== WRC Powerslide (2013) ===
WRC Powerslide was developed by Milestone srl and released on the PlayStation Network, Xbox Live Arcade and Steam.

As of April 2016, the game has been taken down off from the PSN, XLA, and Steam stores.

=== WRC 4: FIA World Rally Championship (2013) ===
WRC 4: FIA World Rally Championship was released on the PlayStation 3, Xbox 360 and PC and PlayStation Vita in October 2013 in Europe. It is the fourth installment in Milestone's rebooted WRC series and is the official video game of the 2013 FIA World Rally Championship, featuring cars and rallies from the 2013 season, including support categories.

=== WRC: FIA World Rally Championship (2014) ===
WRC : FIA World Rally Championship was released on the Nintendo 3DS in December 2014 in Europe, with versions for iOS and Android releasing in the following year. It is the official video game of the 2014 FIA World Rally Championship, featuring cars and rallies from the 2014 season. It was the first WRC released on a Nintendo console.

=== WRC 5 (2015) ===
WRC 5 was released on PlayStation 4, PlayStation 3, PlayStation Vita, Xbox 360, PC and Xbox One in October 2015. It is the first installment on next generation consoles and was developed by Paris-based Kylotonn and published by Bigben Interactive. WRC 5 is the official video game of the 2015 FIA World Rally Championship, featuring cars and rallies from the 2015 season, including support categories, and a total of 400 km of stages. It is the first WRC game for eighth generation consoles. This game featured British indie rock band Bastille's song "Pompeii" in its intro. The game reached number 10 in the UK physical sales chart, and number 10 in the downloads chart.

=== WRC 6 (2016) ===
WRC 6 was released on PlayStation 4, Xbox One and PC on 7 October 2016. It was developed by Paris-based Kylotonn and published by Bigben Interactive. WRC 6 is the official video game of the 2016 FIA World Rally Championship, featuring cars and rallies from the 2016 season. The Toyota Yaris WRC test car was made available as a pre-order DLC.

=== WRC 7 (2017) ===
WRC 7 was released on PlayStation 4, Xbox One and PC on 26 September 2017. It was developed by Paris-based Kylotonn and published by Bigben Interactive. WRC 7 is the official video game of the 2017 World Rally Championship season, featuring cars and rallies from the 2017 season.

=== WRC 8 (2019) ===
WRC 8 was released on PlayStation 4, Nintendo Switch, Xbox One and PC on 10 September 2019. It was developed by Paris-based Kylotonn and published by Bigben Interactive. WRC 8 is the official video game of the 2019 World Rally Championship season, featuring cars and rallies from the 2019 season.

=== WRC 9 (2020) ===
WRC 9 was released on PlayStation 4, Xbox One and PC on 3 September 2020. PlayStation 5 and Xbox Series X and Series S were launched on 12 November 2020, with the Nintendo Switch version available on 11 March 2021. It was developed by Paris-based Kylotonn and published by Bigben Interactive. WRC 9 is the official video game of the 2020 World Rally Championship season, featuring cars and rallies from the 2020 season.

=== WRC 10 (2021) ===
WRC 10 was released on PlayStation 4, PlayStation 5, Xbox One, Xbox Series X and Series S and PC on 2 September 2021. It was developed by Paris-based Kylotonn and published by Nacon. WRC 10 is the official video game of the 2021 World Rally Championship season, featuring cars and rallies from the 2021 season.

=== WRC Generations (2022) ===
WRC Generations was released on PlayStation 4, PlayStation 5, Xbox One, Xbox Series X and Series S and PC on 3 November 2022. It was the last WRC game developed by Paris-based Kylotonn and published by Nacon. WRC Generations is the official video game of the 2022 World Rally Championship season, featuring cars and rallies from the 2022 season.

=== EA Sports WRC (2023) ===
Codemasters regained the WRC license in 2020 (which in turn being acquired by Electronic Arts in 2021); following this, it was rumored in 2022 that work on Dirt games had been suspended. On 1 September 2023, EA Sports confirmed that the next game will titled EA Sports WRC, with a full reveal taking place on 5 September. The game was released on 3 November 2023.

== See also ==
- List of World Rally Championship video games
