= WRC FIA World Rally Championship =

2010 video game

- Cover art
- Developer(s): Milestone srl
- Publisher(s): Black Bean Games; Cyberfront
- Series: World Rally Championship
- Platform(s): Microsoft Windows; PlayStation 3 Xbox 360
- Release: AU: October 7, 2010 (PS3, X360); EU: October 8, 2010; JP: April 14, 2011 (PS3, X360)
- Genre(s): Racing
- Mode(s): Single-player, multiplayer

WRC FIA World Rally Championship is a car racing video game based on the 2010 season of the World Rally Championship (WRC). It is the first game to be officially licensed by the WRC since 2005's WRC: Rally Evolved, and is the seventh game to bear the WRC licence. The game was developed by Milestone srl and published by Black Bean Games. The developer had also created Superstars V8 Racing and Alfa Romeo Racing Italiano.

It features the official cars, drivers and co-drivers from the 2010 season and from the three support classes: Production World Rally Championship, Super 2000 World Rally Championship and Junior World Rally Championship. The game therefore includes 13 rallies, including Rally Finland and Rally de Portugal. 550 km of stages are included, split up into 78 special stages.

There was also a downloadable car pack featuring many Group B rally cars from the 1980s that could be available via Xbox Live Marketplace and the PlayStation Store.

Car models contain around 50,000 polygons. The PC version of the game does not support Multiplayer LAN mode, it supports single player, a party mode on the same PC and Online Multiplayer using a GameSpy account.

== Reception ==
Reception

Aggregate score
Aggregator	Score		
Aggregator	PC	PS3	Xbox 360
Metacritic	65/100	68/100	66/100

Review scores
Publication	Score		
Publication	PC	PS3	Xbox 360
Eurogamer	N/A	N/A	7/10
Famitsu	N/A	28/40	28/40
GameSpot	N/A	6.5/10	6.5/10
GamesTM	N/A	N/A	7/10
IGN	7/10	7/10	7/10
PlayStation Official Magazine – UK	N/A	7/10	N/A
Official Xbox Magazine (UK)	N/A	N/A	7/10
PALGN	N/A	N/A	6/10
PC Gamer (UK)	59%	N/A	N/A
VideoGamer.com	N/A	6/10	6/10

The game received "mixed or average reviews" on all platforms according to the review aggregation website Metacritic. It got to number 9 in the UK sales charts. In Japan, where the game was ported and published by Cyberfront on April 14, 2011, Famitsu gave the PlayStation 3 and Xbox 360 versions a score of all four sevens for a total of 28 out of 40.
