= EA Sports WRC =

2023 racing video game

- Cover art for the PC version, featuring the Ford Puma Rally1
- Developer: Codemasters
- Publisher: EA Sports
- Series: WRC
- Engine: Unreal Engine 4
- Platforms: Windows; PlayStation 5; Xbox Series X/S
- Release: 3 November 2023
- Genre: Sim racing
- Modes: Single-player, multiplayer

EA Sports WRC, also known as EA WRC or simply WRC, is a racing video game developed by Codemasters and published by EA Sports. It held the official licence (acquired by Codemasters in 2020 and relinquished in 2025) of the World Rally Championship and is powered by Unreal Engine 4. It was the first Codemasters rally game to have the official WRC licence since Colin McRae Rally 3 in 2002. The game was released for Windows, PlayStation 5 and Xbox Series X/S on 3 November 2023. In 2024, 2 paid DLCs have been released for the game.

== Gameplay ==
EA Sports WRC features 78 rally cars. 10 Groups Rally cars are from the World Rally Championship, including three Rally1 vehicles such as the Puma of M-Sport, the i20 N of Hyundai and the GR Yaris of Toyota and seven other cars from the support categories — the World Rally Championship-2 and the Junior World Rally Championship, including Ford Fiesta Rally3 — as well as 68 classic rally cars. The other rally cars include Citroën Xsara WRC, Mini John Cooper Works WRC, Ford Fiesta Rally4 and Colin McRae R4, which was previously featured in DiRT 3. Car Builder, which is similar to My Team of the F1 series, allows players to create and customise their own rally cars. The game includes over 200 competition stages across 18 WRC rallies. Multiplayer mode is available for up to 32 cross-platform players. Virtual reality mode is planned to be implemented in the future.

== Development and release ==
The game was revealed on 5 September 2023. It was initially built as a sequel to Dirt Rally 2.0. Codemasters, the developer of the F1 series, started development of a WRC video game after they regained the licence in 2020. The last game by Codemasters with WRC licence was Colin McRae Rally 3 released in 2002, featuring the 2002 season. EA Sports published the game after Codemasters was acquired by Electronic Arts in 2021. The game is powered by Unreal Engine 4, replacing Ego, which Codemasters had been using for its Dirt series since 2009's Colin McRae: Dirt 2.

The game was available for Windows, PlayStation 5 and Xbox Series X/S on 3 November 2023. It featured three covers, featuring the Ford Puma Rally1 on PC, Hyundai i20 N Rally1 on Xbox and Toyota GR Yaris Rally1 on PS5. Jon Armstrong, a professional rally driver, worked on the game throughout its development as a game designer.

A major expansion entitled EA Sports WRC 24, also known as EA WRC 24 or simply WRC 24, was launched as downloadable content on 8 October 2024. The expansion featured the official 2024 season cars and two additional locations, Rally Latvia and Rally Poland.

In May 2025, it was announced that Codemasters had stopped development on future WRC titles, leaving EA Sports WRC as the only title made under the license.

== Reception ==
Reception

Aggregate score
Aggregator	Score
Metacritic	(PC) 80/100 (PS5) 77/100 (XSXS) 76/100

Review scores
Publication	Score
Eurogamer	4/5
Hardcore Gamer	4/5
Shacknews	8/10
VG247	4/5

EA Sports WRC received "generally favorable reviews", according to review aggregator Metacritic. Reviewers praised the handling model, the extensive stage length and the car builder. Criticism mainly stemmed from frame-rate issues, especially on the Windows version.
