= WRC 9 =

Official game of the 2020 World Rally Championship

- Game cover featuring Toyota Yaris WRC
- Developer: Kylotonn
- Publisher: Nacon
- Series: World Rally Championship
- Platforms: Microsoft Windows; Nintendo Switch; PlayStation 4; PlayStation 5; Xbox One; Xbox Series X/S
- Release: Windows, PS4, Xbox One: WW: 3 September 2020; Xbox Series X/S: WW: 10 November 2020; PlayStation 5: NA/AU: 12 November 2020; WW: 19 November 2020; Nintendo Switch: WW: March 11, 2021
- Genre: Racing
- Modes: Single-player, multiplayer

WRC 9, also known as WRC 9 FIA World Rally Championship, is the official racing video game of the 2020 World Rally Championship. The game is developed by French developer Kylotonn and published by Nacon. It is available for Microsoft Windows, PlayStation 4, PlayStation 5, Xbox One and Xbox Series X/S, released on 3 September 2020, with the Nintendo Switch version released on 11 March 2021.

== Development and release ==
In March 2020, WRC 9 was revealed as the official game of the 2020 FIA World Rally Championship alongside WRC 10. It features 14 different locations (reflecting the 2020 season as it was originally intended to be run before the COVID-19 pandemic resulted in many events being rescheduled or cancelled and new rallies added to the calendar), including all three returning rallies, Safari Rally, Rally New Zealand and Rally Japan, with up to fifty official crews from WRC, WRC-2, WRC-3 and J-WRC available for the player to choose. The game also features fifteen more landmark vehicles from the WRC history.

The game was released on PC, PlayStation 4 and Xbox One on 3 September 2020 via Epic Games Store, and later on Nintendo Switch, with a further release date on the ninth generation of video game consoles PlayStation 5 and Xbox Series X/S to be announced.

== Reception ==
Reception for WRC 9 was generally favourable among critics. While troubled by smaller issues, improvements with car handling were noted in many outlets. Among critics, the game was scored at 80% by Push Square. Pixel Bandits rated the title at 4/4, noting the fresh challenge provided to long-time fans of the series.

Reception

Aggregate score
Aggregator	Score
Metacritic	PC: 80/100; PS4: 81/100; XONE: 83/100; NS: 64/100

Review scores
Publication	Score
IGN	7.5/10
Jeuxvideo.com	16/20
Push Square	8/10 stars
Screen Rant	4/5 stars
