= WRC 4 =

2004 video game

- PAL cover art featuring Citroën Xsara
- Developer: Evolution Studios
- Publishers: EU: SCEE; JP: Spike
- Series: World Rally Championship
- Platform: PlayStation 2
- Release: EU: 22 October 2004; JP: 7 April 2005
- Genre: Racing
- Modes: Single-player, multiplayer

WRC 4: The Official Game of the FIA World Rally Championship (also known as WRC 4 and WRC 2004) is a racing video game developed by Evolution Studios for the PlayStation 2. It is the fourth rallying game to be officially licensed by the FIA World Rally Championship and is based on the 2004 WRC season.

== Gameplay ==
In a quick race, the player will play a randomly selected stage with a randomly selected car and driver. During the race, the player will have to beat a time trial (although this is not needed to advance in the game). The time target will be based on the 1st place time ranking. If beaten, the best time will be the new target time to beat. The Championship mode lets the player play through the 2004 WRC season. The player must play through this mode based on the real life calendar, following the schedule for the 2004 WRC season. Championship mode ends when all 16 rallies are played, but the player can stop playing after any stage, because the game saves after each stage is finished. The player can play all six stages in a rally, but normally the player will have to buy the stage to play it in other modes.

The Pro Driver Challenge is a career mode where the player takes the role of a rookie who has to start from the weak Super 1600 class and must complete a series of tasks to enter the WRC class. In Super Special Challenge, the player will play against an AI generated opponent in all SSS course in the country's alphabetical order instead of the season's chronology. In a single rally, the player will play all six stages in a selected rally. The test track mode lets the player practice their driving skills or take part in rally tests akin to the license tests of the Gran Turismo series.

== Reception ==
Reception

Aggregate score
Aggregator	Score
Metacritic	77/100

Review scores
Publication	Score
Computer and Video Games	7/10
Eurogamer	8/10
Famitsu	32/40
GamesMaster	88%
PlayStation Official Magazine – UK	9/10
PALGN	7.5/10
Play	83%
PSM3	87%

The game received "generally favorable reviews" according to the review aggregation website Metacritic. In Japan, where the game was localized and published by Spike on 7 April 2005, Famitsu gave it a score of all four eights for a total of 32 out of 40.
