= WRC 10 =

2021 video game

- Game cover featuring a Hyundai i20 Coupe WRC
- Developer: Kylotonn
- Publisher: Nacon
- Series: World Rally Championship
- Platforms: Microsoft Windows; Nintendo Switch; PlayStation 4; PlayStation 5; Xbox One; Xbox Series X/S
- Release: Windows, PlayStation 4, PlayStation 5, Xbox One, Xbox Series X/S: WW: September 2, 2021; Nintendo Switch: EU: March 17, 2022; NA: March 29, 2022
- Genre: Racing
- Modes: Single-player, multiplayer

WRC 10, also known as WRC 10 FIA World Rally Championship, is a racing video game developed by French developer Kylotonn and published by Nacon. It is a sequel to WRC 9 and is the official game of the 2021 World Rally Championship. The game was released for Microsoft Windows, PlayStation 4, PlayStation 5, Xbox One and Xbox Series X/S in September 2021, with the Nintendo Switch version released in March 2022.

== Development and release ==
WRC 10 was revealed in April 2021 as the official video game of the 2021 World Rally Championship, featuring twelve rounds of the season, including Croatia Rally, Rally Estonia, Ypres Rally and Rally de Catalunya. Rally New Zealand was not included in the main campaign, though some special stages are featured in other modes. Celebrating the fiftieth anniversary of the World Rally Championship, the game offers multiple historical rally cars ranging from the classical Group B era to the modern World Rally Cars, such as Alpine A110, Audi Quattro, Lancia Delta Group A, Citroën Xsara WRC. The game was released worldwide on September 2, 2021, for Microsoft Windows, PlayStation 4, PlayStation 5, Xbox One and Xbox Series X/S, followed by a Nintendo Switch port in March 2022.

== Reception ==
Reception

Aggregate score
Aggregator	Score
Metacritic	PC: 74/100; PS5: 76/100; XSXS: 80/100

Review scores
Publication	Score
4Players	62/100
Eurogamer	Recommended
GameStar	79/100
Hardcore Gamer	3.5/5
IGN	8/10
Jeuxvideo.com	16/20
Nintendo Life	7/10
PCMag	3.5/5
Push Square	8/10
Shacknews	7/10
The Games Machine (Italy)	7.5/10
TouchArcade	3/5

WRC 10 received "generally favorable" reviews for PlayStation 5 and Xbox Series X/S according to review aggregator website Metacritic; the Windows version received "mixed or average" reviews.

Eurogamer recommended the game and gave praise to its detail-rich, dynamic stages, variety of available rally cars, and game feel while criticizing the wonky delivery of anniversary events and the sluggish pace of the career mode, writing, "This is familiar stuff from WRC 9 - arguably the high point of the series so far - with familiar problems, and plenty of familiar delights." IGN similarly praised the selection of historically significant rally cars and lush color palette of the rallies while criticizing the lack of difficulty settings in anniversary events, inability to skip the WRC Junior series in career mode, and lack of player agency. The site said that WRC 10 was "the spiciest and arguably the strongest official WRC game to date" but noted that it was only marginally better than WRC 9. While liking the entry's cars, PC Magazine criticized the 50th anniversary mode saying that each stage was a "glorified time trial". Push Square gave the PlayStation 5 version title 8 stars out of 10 and lauded the improved handling and physics, DualSense feedback, historic events and cars, in-depth career mode, and abundance of content, but took issue with the rough visuals, minor bugs, odd progression, and occasional screen tearing. Hardcore Gamer gave the game 3.5 out of 5 and wrote, "WRC 10‘s small but worthwhile alterations to the formula have at least staved off any fear of an eventual plateauing for the series." Shacknews thought positively of the solid driving physics, e-sports functionality, customization options, and amount of content, but disliked the lackluster visuals, lack of iteration upon the prior entry, and performance issues present on PC.

Upon release, the Nintendo Switch port of the game received criticism for its poor visuals from several outlets. Nintendo Life said that the game's graphical issues "are so severe that they provide a huge distraction while driving" and called the framerate "rougher than a cheese grater made of sandpaper", while also panning the long load times and default controls. However, the site also praised the handling, anniversary mode, and the number of tracks available. TouchArcade called the Switch port of WRC 10 a "graphical mess" while praising the iterations made upon WRC 9 and the addition of anniversary content, writing, "If you only have a Switch, truly love rally racing, and are exceptionally forgiving of technical issues, then you might want to give this a look."
