= WRC: FIA World Rally Championship Arcade =

2002 video game

- Mitsubishi Lancer Evolution VII and Subaru Impreza WRC
- Developer: Unique Development Studios
- Publisher: Sony Computer Entertainment
- Series: WRC
- Platform: PlayStation
- Release: EU: 11 August 2002
- Genre: Racing
- Modes: Single-player, multiplayer

WRC: FIA World Rally Championship Arcade (also known as FIA WRC Arcade) is a 2002 racing video game developed by Unique Development Studios and published by Sony Computer Entertainment for the PlayStation. It is based upon the 2002 World Rally Championship season.

== Gameplay ==
WRC: FIA World Rally Championship Arcade features 7 World Rally Championship manufacturer cars along with 14 track locations from 14 different countries that were included in the 2002 World Rally Championship. The tracks are held on various surfaces such as asphalt, dirt, gravel, ice, mud and snow, and range in difficulty from easy to difficult. Races can take place in sunny or wet-weather conditions. Cars vary in how fast they accelerate, how fast they are, and their steering ability. A co-driver guides the player by informing them of which type of corner they are approaching.

The game has five game modes; Time Trial where the aim of the player is to get the fastest time around any available tracks, Vs Mode which is competing against another player, Super Special Mode where the player competes against 16 other vehicles, Grid Race where the player can race against other competitors and unlock bonus tracks.

== Reception ==
The reviewer for Jeuxvideo.com felt the gameplay was sub-par due to it being "reduced to its simplest expression for a driving which turns out frankly not very interesting" and noted its artificial intelligence was not fully developed to adapt to the player's on-track trajectory. The website felt the variations of circuits allowed the usage of braking to be optional, which it believed was surprising for a rallying game. Consoles+ compared WRC: FIA World Rally Championship Arcade's graphics to that of Sega Rally 2 on the Dreamcast and gave the game an 82 percent rating, saying, "Sony offers us a purely arcade rally game".

Play2Mania was highly critical of the game's music, sound effects and the voice of the co-driver as being of a poor quality but felt the gameplay was not complex and entertaining. A reviewer for PSone Magazine wrote that WRC: FIA World Rally Championship Arcade would appeal to large portion of rallying enthusiasts who disliked simulation games.
