= Nacon =

French video game company

Nacon SA
- Type: Public
- Traded as: Euronext Paris: NACON; CAC Small
- Industry: Video games
- Founded: 17 February 1981; 45 years ago
- Headquarters: Lesquin, France
- Area served: Worldwide
- Key people: Alain Falc (CEO, chairman)
- Owners: Bigben Group (76.7%); Bpifrance (2.1%)
- Number of employees: 430 (2020)
- Divisions: Nacon Game Publishing; Nacon Studio Milan
- Subsidiaries: Big Ant Studios; Crea-ture Studios; Cyanide; Daedalic Entertainment; Eko Software; Ishtar Games; Kylotonn; Midgar Studio; RaceWard Studio
- Website: nacongaming.com corporate.nacongaming.com

Nacon SA (formerly Bigben Interactive SA) is a French video game publisher, holdings company and gaming peripherals manufacturer based in Lesquin. It designs and distributes gaming accessories, and publishes and distributes video games for various platforms. In 2020, Bigben Group's gaming activities were consolidated to form Nacon. Bigben Group remains active as a distribution company.

== History ==
BigBen was listed on the Paris Stock Exchange's Second Marché in 1999. In 2001, the company reached an agreement with Sega to distribute the remaining stock of Sega's Dreamcast consoles, accessories and software across Europe. In December 2016, three years after Atari's initial bankruptcy sale, Atari sold the Test Drive franchise to Bigben Interactive. The V-Rally series was also sold to Bigben Interactive around this time without a formal announcement.

In 2010, Nintendo sued BigBen for patent infringement on its Wii Remote controller. The Mannheim Regional Court decided in 2011 in Nintendo's favor, which ruling BigBen appealed. In 2025, Nintendo's German counsel announced the court awarded Nintendo damages of €7 million. Nacon is appealing the ruling, but the damage verdict is enforceable.

=== Nacon as a separate entity ===
Through 2020, Bigben Interactive was subsidiary of the Bigben Group, which also oversaw Nacon, its video game accessory company. On 11 February 2020, the parent company announced it was merging Bigben Interactive and Nacon into a single entity to go as Nacon. In January 2021, Nacon announced that it had acquired Australian video game developer Big Ant Studios. On 1 March 2021, video game developer Frogwares alleged Nacon illegally hacked and published a pirated version of their game, The Sinking City, on Steam in February 2021 during an ongoing distribution dispute between the two companies. In August 2021, Nacon acquired Crea-ture Studios. In October 2021, Nacon acquired Ishtar Games. In February 2022, Nacon acquired Midgar Studio. Nacon announced its intent to acquire Daedalic Entertainment for an estimated $60 million in February 2022, with the deal concluding in April 2022.

In May 2022, Nacon announced the formation of Nacon Studio Milan, encompassing its October 2020 acquisition RaceWard Studio, as well as other yet to be named studios. in 2020, Nacon acquired RIG gaming, a gaming accessory brand.

In February 2026, Nacon filed for insolvency due to Bigben Group's financial issues.

== Studios ==
Studio	Subsidiary	Location	Founded/acquisition	Ref.
Big Ant Studios		Melbourne	January 2021	
Crea-ture Studios		Montréal	August 2021	
Cyanide	Amusement Cyanide	Montréal	May 2018	
Cyanide	Rogue Factor	Montréal	May 2018	
Daedalic Entertainment		Hamburg	April 2022	
Eko Software		Paris	September 2018	
Kylotonn	Kylotonn Lyon	Lyon	October 2018	
Ishtar Games		Lille; Bordeaux	October 2021	
Neopica		Ghent	October 2020	
Nacon Studio Milan		Milan	May 2022	

=== Former ===
Studio	Subsidiary	Location	Founded/acquisition	Closed	Ref.
Spiders		Paris	July 2019	April 2026	
Cyanide	Big Bad Wolf	Bordeaux	May 2018	May 2026	
Midgar Studio		Nîmes	February 2022	July 2026	

== Games published ==
Title	Platform(s)	Release date	Developer(s)
Cannon Spike	Dreamcast	3 May 2002	Psikyo
Ring II: Twilight of the Gods	Microsoft Windows	September 2002	Arxel Tribe
Final Stretch: Horse Racing Sim	Microsoft Windows	15 March 2003	Cyanide
Itch!	Microsoft Windows	2003	JoWooD Vienna
Dance: UK	PlayStation	3 October 2003	Broadsword Interactive
Dance: UK	PlayStation 2	3 October 2003	Broadsword Interactive
Dance: UK	Xbox	2004	Broadsword Interactive
Dance: UK - Extra Trax	PlayStation	30 April 2004	Broadsword Interactive
Savage Skies	PlayStation 2	2 July 2004	iRock Games
Cocoto Platform Jumper	PlayStation 2	9 July 2004	Neko Entertainment
Cocoto Platform Jumper	GameCube	10 December 2004	Neko Entertainment
Mouse Trophy	PlayStation 2	2004	Neko Entertainment
Cocoto: Kart Racer	PlayStation 2	2 March 2005	Neko Entertainment
Cocoto: Kart Racer	GameCube	22 April 2005	Neko Entertainment
David Douillet Judo	Microsoft Windows	2 October 2006	10Tacle Studios Belgium
David Douillet Judo	PlayStation 2	2 April 2007	10Tacle Studios Belgium
Dolphin Trainer	Nintendo DS	28 May 2009	Sanuk Games
Mad Tracks	Microsoft Windows	4 December 2009	Load
Mad Tracks	Xbox Live Arcade	4 December 2009	Load
Maestro! Green Groove	Nintendo DSi	28 June 2010	Neko Entertainment
Marvel Super Heroes 3D: Grandmaster's Challenge	Wii	12 November 2010	Neko Entertainment
Pucca's Race for Kisses	Wii	14 February 2011	Otaboo
Cyberbike	Wii	5 May 2011	EKO Software
Brick Breaker	PlayStation 3	21 June 2011	Hydravision Entertainment
Brick Breaker	PlayStation Portable	21 June 2011	Hydravision Entertainment
Brick Breaker	PlayStation Vita	22 February 2012	Hydravision Entertainment
Labyrinth	PlayStation 3	21 June 2011	Hydravision Entertainment
Labyrinth	PlayStation Portable	21 June 2011	Hydravision Entertainment
Solitaire	PlayStation 3	21 June 2011	Hydravision Entertainment
Solitaire	PlayStation Portable	21 June 2011	Hydravision Entertainment
Tetraminos	PlayStation 3	28 June 2011	Hydravision Entertainment
Tetraminos	PlayStation Portable	28 June 2011	Hydravision Entertainment
Judge Dee: The City God Case	PlayStation 3	11 July 2012	BiP Media
Hunter's Trophy 2: Europa	PlayStation 3	26 October 2012	Kylotonn
Hunter's Trophy 2: Europa	Xbox Live Arcade	18 June 2013	Kylotonn
Cocoto: Alien Brick Breaker	Nintendo 3DS	24 January 2013	Neko Entertainment
Viking Invasion 2: Tower Defense	Nintendo 3DS	21 February 2013	BiP Media
Hunter's Trophy 2: America	Xbox Live Arcade	17 May 2013	Kylotonn
Hunter's Trophy 2: America	PlayStation 3	3 September 2013	Kylotonn
Hunter's Trophy 2: Australia	Xbox Live Arcade	29 May 2013	Kylotonn
Hunter's Trophy 2: Australia	PlayStation 3	10 September 2013	Kylotonn
I Love My Pets	Nintendo 3DS	21 June 2013	Neopica
My Farm	Nintendo 3DS	1 August 2013	BiP Media
Games Festival 2	Nintendo 3DS	6 September 2013	Neopica
Truck Racer	Microsoft Windows	18 October 2013	Kylotonn
Truck Racer	PlayStation 3	18 October 2013	Kylotonn
Truck Racer	Xbox 360	18 October 2013	Kylotonn
WRC 4: FIA World Rally Championship	PlayStation 3	25 October 2013	Milestone
WRC 4: FIA World Rally Championship	PlayStation Vita	25 October 2013	Milestone
WRC 4: FIA World Rally Championship	Xbox 360	25 October 2013	Milestone
Bella Sara 2: The Magic of Drasilmare	Nintendo 3DS	22 November 2013	Eko Software
My Exotic Farm	Nintendo 3DS	28 November 2013	BiP Media
Cocoto: Magic Circus 2	Wii U	9 January 2014	Neko Entertainment
Spot the Differences!	Nintendo 3DS	13 February 2014	Sanuk Games
Candy Match 3	Nintendo 3DS	21 February 2014	Sanuk Games
IHF Handball Challenge 14	Microsoft Windows	28 March 2014	Neutron Games
IHF Handball Challenge 14	PlayStation 3	28 March 2014	Neutron Games
IHF Handball Challenge 14	Xbox 360	28 March 2014	Neutron Games
Hello Kitty: Happy Happy Family	Nintendo 3DS	26 September 2014	Compile Heart
Best of Board Games: Mah-jong	PlayStation 3	14 October 2014	Neko Entertainment
Best of Board Games: Mah-jong	PlayStation Vita	14 October 2014	Neko Entertainment
Best of Board Games: Mah-jong	Nintendo 3DS	30 July 2015	Neko Entertainment
Best of Board Games: Solitaire	PlayStation 3	14 October 2014	Neko Entertainment
Best of Board Games: Solitaire	PlayStation Vita	14 October 2014	Neko Entertainment
Best of Board Games: Solitaire	Nintendo 3DS	30 July 2015	Neko Entertainment
Survivor: Heroes	Nintendo 3DS	16 October 2014	Fishing Cactus
Asterix: The Mansions of the Gods	Nintendo 3DS	20 November 2014	Neopica
Motorcycle Club	Microsoft Windows	28 November 2014	Kylotonn
WRC FIA World Rally Championship: The Official Game	Android	4 December 2014	Firebrand Games
WRC FIA World Rally Championship: The Official Game	iOS	31 December 2014	Firebrand Games
WRC FIA World Rally Championship: The Official Game	Nintendo 3DS	15 January 2015	Firebrand Games
I Love My Little Boy	Nintendo 3DS	11 December 2014	Neopica
I Love My Little Girl	Nintendo 3DS	11 December 2014	Neopica
I Love My Horse	Nintendo 3DS	18 December 2014	Neopica
Best of Arcade Games: Air Hockey	PlayStation 3	20 January 2015	Eko Software
Best of Arcade Games: Air Hockey	PlayStation Vita	20 January 2015	Eko Software
Best of Arcade Games: Air Hockey	Nintendo 3DS	12 February 2015	Eko Software
Best of Arcade Games: Brick Breaker	PlayStation 3	20 January 2015	Eko Software
Best of Arcade Games: Brick Breaker	PlayStation Vita	20 January 2015	Eko Software
Best of Arcade Games: Brick Breaker	Nintendo 3DS	5 February 2015	Eko Software
Best of Arcade Games: Bubble Buster	PlayStation 3	20 January 2015	Eko Software
Best of Arcade Games: Bubble Buster	PlayStation Vita	20 January 2015	Eko Software
Best of Arcade Games: Bubble Buster	Nintendo 3DS	19 February 2015	Eko Software
Best of Arcade Games: Tetraminos	PlayStation 3	20 January 2015	Eko Software
Best of Arcade Games: Tetraminos	PlayStation Vita	20 January 2015	Eko Software
Best of Arcade Games: Tetraminos	Nintendo 3DS	26 February 2015	Eko Software
Motorcycle Club	PlayStation 3	20 January 2015	Kylotonn
Motorcycle Club	PlayStation 4	20 January 2015	Kylotonn
Rugby 15	Microsoft Windows	23 January 2015	HB Studios
Rugby 15	PlayStation 3	23 January 2015	HB Studios
Rugby 15	PlayStation 4	23 January 2015	HB Studios
Rugby 15	PlayStation Vita	23 January 2015	HB Studios
Rugby 15	Xbox 360	23 January 2015	HB Studios
Rugby 15	Xbox One	23 January 2015	HB Studios
Flap Flap	Nintendo 3DS	19 February 2015	Sanuk Games
Hollywood Fame: Hidden Object Adventure	Nintendo 3DS	5 March 2015	Most Wanted Entertainment
Shanghai Mahjong	Nintendo 3DS	12 March 2015	Sanuk Games
Navy Commander	Nintendo 3DS	19 March 2015	Sanuk Games
Best of Board Games: Chess	Nintendo 3DS	18 June 2015	Neko Entertainment
Best of Board Games: Chess	PlayStation 3	18 June 2015	Neko Entertainment
Best of Board Games: Chess	PlayStation Vita	18 June 2015	Neko Entertainment
I Love My Dogs	Nintendo 3DS	16 July 2015	Neopica
I Love My Cats	Nintendo 3DS	23 July 2015	Neopica
Rugby World Cup 2015	Microsoft Windows	4 September 2015	HB Studios
Rugby World Cup 2015	PlayStation 3	4 September 2015	HB Studios
Rugby World Cup 2015	PlayStation 4	4 September 2015	HB Studios
Rugby World Cup 2015	PlayStation Vita	4 September 2015	HB Studios
Rugby World Cup 2015	Xbox 360	4 September 2015	HB Studios
Rugby World Cup 2015	Xbox One	4 September 2015	HB Studios
WRC 5	Microsoft Windows	13 October 2015	Kylotonn
WRC 5	PlayStation 3	13 October 2015	Kylotonn
WRC 5	PlayStation 4	13 October 2015	Kylotonn
WRC 5	PlayStation Vita	13 October 2015	Kylotonn
WRC 5	Xbox 360	13 October 2015	Kylotonn
WRC 5	Xbox One	13 October 2015	Kylotonn
I Love My Pony	Nintendo 3DS	19 November 2015	Neopica
Handball 16	Microsoft Windows	27 November 2015	Eko Software
Handball 16	PlayStation 3	27 November 2015	Eko Software
Handball 16	PlayStation 4	27 November 2015	Eko Software
Handball 16	PlayStation Vita	27 November 2015	Eko Software
Handball 16	Xbox 360	27 November 2015	Eko Software
Handball 16	Xbox One	27 November 2015	Eko Software
Tetraminos	PlayStation 4	8 March 2016	Sanuk Games
Tetraminos	Xbox One	8 March 2016	Sanuk Games
Tetraminos	Microsoft Windows	20 February 2017	Sanuk Games
Brick Breaker	PlayStation 4	26 April 2016	Sanuk Games
Brick Breaker	Xbox One	26 April 2016	Sanuk Games
Brick Breaker	Microsoft Windows	20 February 2017	Sanuk Games
Brick Breaker	Nintendo Switch	24 December 2018	Sanuk Games
Mahjong	PlayStation 4	13 September 2016	Sanuk Games
Mahjong	Xbox One	13 September 2016	Sanuk Games
Mahjong	Microsoft Windows	20 February 2017	Sanuk Games
WRC 6	Microsoft Windows	7 October 2016	Kylotonn / Persistent Studios
WRC 6	PlayStation 4	7 October 2016	Kylotonn / Persistent Studios
WRC 6	Xbox One	7 October 2016	Kylotonn / Persistent Studios
Solitaire	PlayStation 4	11 October 2016	Sanuk Games
Solitaire	Xbox One	11 October 2016	Sanuk Games
Solitaire	Wii U	27 October 2016	Sanuk Games
Solitaire	Microsoft Windows	20 February 2017	Sanuk Games
Sherlock Holmes: The Devil's Daughter	Microsoft Windows	10 June 2016	Frogwares
Sherlock Holmes: The Devil's Daughter	PlayStation 4	25 October 2016	Frogwares
Sherlock Holmes: The Devil's Daughter	Xbox One	25 October 2016	Frogwares
Handball 17	Microsoft Windows	11 November 2016	Eko Software
Handball 17	PlayStation 3	11 November 2016	Eko Software
Handball 17	PlayStation 4	11 November 2016	Eko Software
Handball 17	Xbox One	11 November 2016	Eko Software
The Voice	PlayStation 4	25 November 2016	Voxler
The Voice	Wii	25 November 2016	Voxler
The Voice	Xbox One	25 November 2016	Voxler
2Dark	Microsoft Windows	10 March 2017	Gloomywood
2Dark	PlayStation 4	10 March 2017	Gloomywood
2Dark	Xbox One	10 March 2017	Gloomywood
FlatOut 4: Total Insanity	PlayStation 4	17 March 2017	Kylotonn
FlatOut 4: Total Insanity	Xbox One	17 March 2017	Kylotonn
Hunting Simulator	Microsoft Windows	9 June 2017	Neopica
Hunting Simulator	PlayStation 4	11 July 2017	Neopica
Hunting Simulator	Xbox One	11 July 2017	Neopica
Hunting Simulator	Nintendo Switch	10 July 2018	Neopica
WRC 7	Microsoft Windows	15 September 2017	Kylotonn
WRC 7	PlayStation 4	15 September 2017	Kylotonn
WRC 7	Xbox One	15 September 2017	Kylotonn
Rugby 18	Microsoft Windows	27 October 2017	Eko Software
Rugby 18	PlayStation 4	27 October 2017	Eko Software
Rugby 18	Xbox One	27 October 2017	Eko Software
Outcast: Second Contact	Microsoft Windows	14 November 2017	Appeal Studios
Outcast: Second Contact	PlayStation 4	28 November 2017	Appeal Studios
Outcast: Second Contact	Xbox One	28 November 2017	Appeal Studios
Aqua Moto Racing Utopia	Nintendo Switch	24 November 2017	Zordix
Snow Moto Racing Freedom	Nintendo Switch	24 November 2017	Zordix
Premium Pool Arena	Nintendo Switch	6 February 2018	Iceflake Studios
Premium Pool Arena	PlayStation 4	20 February 2018	Iceflake Studios
Premium Pool Arena	Xbox One	20 February 2018	Iceflake Studios
Isle of Man TT: Ride on the Edge	PlayStation 4	13 March 2018	Kylotonn / Persistent Studios
Isle of Man TT: Ride on the Edge	Xbox One	13 March 2018	Kylotonn / Persistent Studios
Isle of Man TT: Ride on the Edge	Microsoft Windows	27 March 2018	Kylotonn / Persistent Studios
Tennis World Tour	PlayStation 4	22 May 2018	Breakpoint Studio
Tennis World Tour	Xbox One	22 May 2018	Breakpoint Studio
Tennis World Tour	Microsoft Windows	12 June 2018	Breakpoint Studio
Tennis World Tour	Nintendo Switch	29 October 2018	Breakpoint Studio
Warhammer 40,000: Inquisitor - Martyr	PlayStation 4	23 August 2018	NeocoreGames
Warhammer 40,000: Inquisitor - Martyr	Xbox One	23 August 2018	NeocoreGames
V-Rally 4	PlayStation 4	7 September 2018	Kylotonn
V-Rally 4	Xbox One	7 September 2018	Kylotonn
V-Rally 4	Microsoft Windows	25 September 2018	Kylotonn
V-Rally 4	Nintendo Switch	13 December 2018	Kylotonn
Solitaire	Nintendo Switch	6 November 2018	Sanuk Games
Mahjong	Nintendo Switch	13 November 2018	Sanuk Games
My Little Riding Champion	PlayStation 4	29 November 2018	Caipirinha Games
My Little Riding Champion	Xbox One	29 November 2018	Caipirinha Games
My Little Riding Champion	Nintendo Switch	24 December 2018	Caipirinha Games
Pro Fishing Simulator	Microsoft Windows	29 November 2018	Sanuk Games
Pro Fishing Simulator	PlayStation 4	5 February 2019	Sanuk Games
Pro Fishing Simulator	Xbox One	5 February 2019	Sanuk Games
Tetraminos	Nintendo Switch	24 December 2018	Sanuk Games
Spike Volleyball	Microsoft Windows	5 February 2019	Black Sheep Studio
Spike Volleyball	PlayStation 4	5 February 2019	Black Sheep Studio
Spike Volleyball	Xbox One	5 February 2019	Black Sheep Studio
Isle of Man TT: Ride on the Edge	Nintendo Switch	23 March 2019	Kylotonn / Persistent Studios
Warhammer: Chaosbane	PlayStation 4	31 May 2019	Eko Software
Warhammer: Chaosbane	Xbox One	31 May 2019	Eko Software
Pro Cycling Manager Season 2019	Microsoft Windows	27 June 2019	Cyanide
The Sinking City	Microsoft Windows	27 June 2019	Frogwares
The Sinking City	PlayStation 4	27 June 2019	Frogwares
The Sinking City	Xbox One	27 June 2019	Frogwares
Tour de France: Season 2019	PlayStation 4	2 July 2019	Cyanide
Tour de France: Season 2019	Xbox One	2 July 2019	Cyanide
Blood Bowl: Death Zone	Microsoft Windows	10 July 2019	Cyanide
FIA European Truck Racing Championship	Microsoft Windows	18 July 2019	N-Racing
FIA European Truck Racing Championship	PlayStation 4	18 July 2019	N-Racing
FIA European Truck Racing Championship	Xbox One	18 July 2019	N-Racing
FIA European Truck Racing Championship	Nintendo Switch	8 August 2019	N-Racing
WRC 8	Microsoft Windows	10 September 2019	Kylotonn
WRC 8	PlayStation 4	10 September 2019	Kylotonn
WRC 8	Xbox One	10 September 2019	Kylotonn
WRC 8	Nintendo Switch	19 November 2019	Kylotonn
The Fisherman: Fishing Planet	Microsoft Windows	17 October 2019	Fishing Planet
The Fisherman: Fishing Planet	PlayStation 4	17 October 2019	Fishing Planet
The Fisherman: Fishing Planet	Xbox One	17 October 2019	Fishing Planet
Bee Simulator	Microsoft Windows	14 November 2019	VARSAV Game Studios / Anshar Studios
Bee Simulator	Nintendo Switch	14 November 2019	VARSAV Game Studios / Anshar Studios
Bee Simulator	PlayStation 4	14 November 2019	VARSAV Game Studios / Anshar Studios
Bee Simulator	Xbox One	14 November 2019	VARSAV Game Studios / Anshar Studios
The Unicorn Princess	Nintendo Switch	14 November 2019	Caipirinha Games
The Unicorn Princess	PlayStation 4	14 November 2019	Caipirinha Games
The Unicorn Princess	Xbox One	14 November 2019	Caipirinha Games
Farmer's Dynasty	PlayStation 4	21 November 2019	Toplitz Productions / UMEO Studios
Farmer's Dynasty	Xbox One	21 November 2019	Toplitz Productions / UMEO Studios
Paranoia: Happiness is Mandatory	Microsoft Windows	5 December 2019	Black Shamrock / Cyanide
AO Tennis 2	Microsoft Windows	9 January 2020	Big Ant Studios
AO Tennis 2	Nintendo Switch	9 January 2020	Big Ant Studios
AO Tennis 2	PlayStation 4	9 January 2020	Big Ant Studios
AO Tennis 2	Xbox One	9 January 2020	Big Ant Studios
AO Tennis 2	Amazon Luna	20 October 2020	Big Ant Studios
Rugby 20	Microsoft Windows	23 January 2020	Eko Software
Rugby 20	PlayStation 4	23 January 2020	Eko Software
Rugby 20	Xbox One	23 January 2020	Eko Software
Overpass	Microsoft Windows	27 February 2020	Zordix
Overpass	Nintendo Switch	27 February 2020	Zordix
Overpass	PlayStation 4	27 February 2020	Zordix
Overpass	Xbox One	27 February 2020	Zordix
Isle of Man TT: Ride on the Edge 2	Microsoft Windows	19 March 2020	Kylotonn
Isle of Man TT: Ride on the Edge 2	PlayStation 4	19 March 2020	Kylotonn
Isle of Man TT: Ride on the Edge 2	Xbox One	19 March 2020	Kylotonn
Isle of Man TT: Ride on the Edge 2	Nintendo Switch	14 May 2020	Kylotonn
Farmer's Dynasty	Nintendo Switch	30 April 2020	Toplitz Productions / UMEO Studios
Pro Cycling Manager 2020	Microsoft Windows	4 June 2020	Cyanide
Tour de France 2020	PlayStation 4	4 June 2020	Cyanide
Tour de France 2020	Xbox One	4 June 2020	Cyanide
Tour de France 2020	Microsoft Windows	27 August 2020	Cyanide
Hunting Simulator 2	Microsoft Windows	16 July 2020	Neopica
Hunting Simulator 2	PlayStation 4	16 July 2020	Neopica
Hunting Simulator 2	Xbox One	16 July 2020	Neopica
Hunting Simulator 2	Nintendo Switch	15 October 2020	Neopica
Hunting Simulator 2	PlayStation 5	11 March 2021	Neopica
Hunting Simulator 2	Xbox Series X/S	11 March 2021	Neopica
WRC 9	Microsoft Windows	3 September 2020	Kylotonn
WRC 9	PlayStation 4	3 September 2020	Kylotonn
WRC 9	Xbox One	3 September 2020	Kylotonn
WRC 9	Xbox Series X/S	10 November 2020	Kylotonn
WRC 9	PlayStation 5	12 November 2020	Kylotonn
WRC 9	Nintendo Switch	11 March 2021	Kylotonn
Tennis World Tour 2	Microsoft Windows	24 September 2020	Big Ant Studios
Tennis World Tour 2	PlayStation 4	24 September 2020	Big Ant Studios
Tennis World Tour 2	Xbox One	24 September 2020	Big Ant Studios
Tennis World Tour 2	Nintendo Switch	15 October 2020	Big Ant Studios
Tennis World Tour 2	Amazon Luna	19 April 2021	Big Ant Studios
Monster Truck Championship	Microsoft Windows	15 October 2020	Teyon
Monster Truck Championship	PlayStation 4	15 October 2020	Teyon
Monster Truck Championship	Xbox One	15 October 2020	Teyon
Monster Truck Championship	Nintendo Switch	19 November 2020	Teyon
Warhammer: Chaosbane - Slayer Edition	Xbox Series X/S	10 November 2020	Eko Software
Warhammer: Chaosbane - Slayer Edition	PlayStation 5	12 November 2020	Eko Software
Handball 21	Microsoft Windows	12 November 2020	Eko Software
Handball 21	PlayStation 4	12 November 2020	Eko Software
Handball 21	Xbox One	12 November 2020	Eko Software
Werewolf: The Apocalypse - Earthblood	Microsoft Windows	4 February 2021	Cyanide / Black Shamrock
Werewolf: The Apocalypse - Earthblood	PlayStation 4	4 February 2021	Cyanide / Black Shamrock
Werewolf: The Apocalypse - Earthblood	PlayStation 5	4 February 2021	Cyanide / Black Shamrock
Werewolf: The Apocalypse - Earthblood	Xbox One	4 February 2021	Cyanide / Black Shamrock
Werewolf: The Apocalypse - Earthblood	Xbox Series X/S	4 February 2021	Cyanide / Black Shamrock
Pro Cycling Manager 2021	Microsoft Windows	3 June 2021	Cyanide
Tour de France 2021	Microsoft Windows	3 June 2021	Cyanide
Tour de France 2021	PlayStation 4	3 June 2021	Cyanide
Tour de France 2021	Xbox One	3 June 2021	Cyanide
Roguebook	Microsoft Windows	17 June 2021	Abrakam
Roguebook	PlayStation 4	24 February 2022	Abrakam
Roguebook	Xbox One	24 February 2022	Abrakam
Roguebook	Nintendo Switch	22 April 2022	Abrakam
RiMS Racing	Microsoft Windows	19 August 2021	RaceWard Studio
RiMS Racing	Nintendo Switch	19 August 2021	RaceWard Studio
RiMS Racing	PlayStation 4	19 August 2021	RaceWard Studio
RiMS Racing	PlayStation 5	19 August 2021	RaceWard Studio
RiMS Racing	Xbox One	19 August 2021	RaceWard Studio
RiMS Racing	Xbox Series X/S	19 August 2021	RaceWard Studio
WRC 10	Microsoft Windows	2 September 2021	Kylotonn
WRC 10	PlayStation 4	2 September 2021	Kylotonn
WRC 10	PlayStation 5	2 September 2021	Kylotonn
WRC 10	Xbox One	2 September 2021	Kylotonn
WRC 10	Xbox Series X/S	2 September 2021	Kylotonn
WRC 10	Nintendo Switch	17 March 2022	Kylotonn
Rogue Lords	Microsoft Windows	30 September 2021	Leikir Studio / Cyanide
Rogue Lords	Nintendo Switch	28 April 2022	Leikir Studio / Cyanide
Rogue Lords	PlayStation 4	28 April 2022	Leikir Studio / Cyanide
Rogue Lords	Xbox One	28 April 2022	Leikir Studio / Cyanide
Cricket 22	Microsoft Windows	25 November 2021	Big Ant Studios
Cricket 22	PlayStation 4	25 November 2021	Big Ant Studios
Cricket 22	PlayStation 5	25 November 2021	Big Ant Studios
Cricket 22	Xbox One	25 November 2021	Big Ant Studios
Cricket 22	Xbox Series X/S	25 November 2021	Big Ant Studios
Cricket 22	Nintendo Switch	28 April 2022	Big Ant Studios
Rugby 22	Microsoft Windows	27 January 2022	Eko Software
Rugby 22	PlayStation 4	27 January 2022	Eko Software
Rugby 22	PlayStation 5	27 January 2022	Eko Software
Rugby 22	Xbox One	27 January 2022	Eko Software
Rugby 22	Xbox Series X/S	27 January 2022	Eko Software
Vampire: The Masquerade – Swansong	Microsoft Windows	19 May 2022	Big Bad Wolf
Vampire: The Masquerade – Swansong	PlayStation 4	19 May 2022	Big Bad Wolf
Vampire: The Masquerade – Swansong	PlayStation 5	19 May 2022	Big Bad Wolf
Vampire: The Masquerade – Swansong	Xbox One	19 May 2022	Big Bad Wolf
Vampire: The Masquerade – Swansong	Xbox Series X/S	19 May 2022	Big Bad Wolf
Vampire: The Masquerade – Swansong	Nintendo Switch	28 September 2023	Big Bad Wolf
Pro Cycling Manager 2022	Microsoft Windows	9 June 2022	Cyanide
Tour De France 2022	Microsoft Windows	9 June 2022	Cyanide
Tour De France 2022	PlayStation 4	9 June 2022	Cyanide
Tour De France 2022	PlayStation 5	9 June 2022	Cyanide
Tour De France 2022	Xbox One	9 June 2022	Cyanide
Tour De France 2022	Xbox Series X/S	9 June 2022	Cyanide
Zorro - The Chronicles	Microsoft Windows	16 June 2022	PVP Games, BKOM Studios
Zorro - The Chronicles	Nintendo Switch	16 June 2022	PVP Games, BKOM Studios
Zorro - The Chronicles	PlayStation 4	16 June 2022	PVP Games, BKOM Studios
Zorro - The Chronicles	PlayStation 5	16 June 2022	PVP Games, BKOM Studios
Zorro - The Chronicles	Xbox One	16 June 2022	PVP Games, BKOM Studios
Zorro - The Chronicles	Xbox Series X/S	16 June 2022	PVP Games, BKOM Studios
Train Life: A Railway Simulator	Microsoft Windows	25 August 2022	Simteract
Train Life: A Railway Simulator	PlayStation 4	22 September 2022	Simteract
Train Life: A Railway Simulator	PlayStation 5	22 September 2022	Simteract
Train Life: A Railway Simulator	Xbox One	22 September 2022	Simteract
Train Life: A Railway Simulator	Xbox Series X/S	22 September 2022	Simteract
Train Life: A Railway Simulator	Nintendo Switch	9 March 2023	Simteract
Steelrising	Microsoft Windows	8 September 2022	Spiders
Steelrising	PlayStation 4	8 September 2022	Spiders
Steelrising	PlayStation 5	8 September 2022	Spiders
Steelrising	Xbox One	8 September 2022	Spiders
Steelrising	Xbox Series X/S	8 September 2022	Spiders
Session: Skate Sim	Microsoft Windows	22 September 2022	Crea-ture Studios
Session: Skate Sim	PlayStation 4	22 September 2022	Crea-ture Studios
Session: Skate Sim	PlayStation 5	22 September 2022	Crea-ture Studios
Session: Skate Sim	Xbox One	22 September 2022	Crea-ture Studios
Session: Skate Sim	Xbox Series X/S	22 September 2022	Crea-ture Studios
Session: Skate Sim	Nintendo Switch	16 March 2023	Crea-ture Studios
WRC Generations	Microsoft Windows	3 November 2022	Kylotonn
WRC Generations	PlayStation 4	3 November 2022	Kylotonn
WRC Generations	PlayStation 5	3 November 2022	Kylotonn
WRC Generations	Xbox One	3 November 2022	Kylotonn
WRC Generations	Xbox Series X/S	3 November 2022	Kylotonn
WRC Generations	Nintendo Switch	1 December 2022	Kylotonn
My Fantastic Ranch	Microsoft Windows	17 November 2022	Piece of Cake Studios
My Fantastic Ranch	Nintendo Switch	17 November 2022	Piece of Cake Studios
My Fantastic Ranch	PlayStation 4	17 November 2022	Piece of Cake Studios
My Fantastic Ranch	PlayStation 5	17 November 2022	Piece of Cake Studios
My Fantastic Ranch	Xbox One	17 November 2022	Piece of Cake Studios
My Fantastic Ranch	Xbox Series X/S	17 November 2022	Piece of Cake Studios
Blood Bowl 3	Microsoft Windows	23 February 2023	Cyanide
Blood Bowl 3	PlayStation 4	23 February 2023	Cyanide
Blood Bowl 3	PlayStation 5	23 February 2023	Cyanide
Blood Bowl 3	Xbox One	23 February 2023	Cyanide
Blood Bowl 3	Xbox Series X/S	23 February 2023	Cyanide
Blood Bowl 3	Nintendo Switch	TBA	Cyanide
Chef Life: A Restaurant Simulator	Microsoft Windows	23 February 2023	Cyanide
Chef Life: A Restaurant Simulator	Nintendo Switch	23 February 2023	Cyanide
Chef Life: A Restaurant Simulator	PlayStation 4	23 February 2023	Cyanide
Chef Life: A Restaurant Simulator	PlayStation 5	23 February 2023	Cyanide
Chef Life: A Restaurant Simulator	Xbox One	23 February 2023	Cyanide
Chef Life: A Restaurant Simulator	Xbox Series X/S	23 February 2023	Cyanide
Clash: Artifacts of Chaos	Microsoft Windows	9 March 2023	ACE Team
Clash: Artifacts of Chaos	PlayStation 4	9 March 2023	ACE Team
Clash: Artifacts of Chaos	PlayStation 5	9 March 2023	ACE Team
Clash: Artifacts of Chaos	Xbox One	9 March 2023	ACE Team
Clash: Artifacts of Chaos	Xbox Series X/S	9 March 2023	ACE Team
Transport Fever 2: Console Edition	PlayStation 4	9 March 2023	Urban Games
Transport Fever 2: Console Edition	PlayStation 5	9 March 2023	Urban Games
Transport Fever 2: Console Edition	Xbox One	9 March 2023	Urban Games
Transport Fever 2: Console Edition	Xbox Series X/S	9 March 2023	Urban Games
AFL 23	Microsoft Windows	4 May 2023	Big Ant Studios
AFL 23	PlayStation 4	4 May 2023	Big Ant Studios
AFL 23	PlayStation 5	4 May 2023	Big Ant Studios
AFL 23	Xbox One	22 September 2023	Big Ant Studios
AFL 23	Xbox Series X/S	22 September 2023	Big Ant Studios
TT Isle of Man: Ride on the Edge 3	Microsoft Windows	11 May 2023	Raceward Studio
TT Isle of Man: Ride on the Edge 3	Nintendo Switch	11 May 2023	Raceward Studio
TT Isle of Man: Ride on the Edge 3	PlayStation 4	11 May 2023	Raceward Studio
TT Isle of Man: Ride on the Edge 3	PlayStation 5	11 May 2023	Raceward Studio
TT Isle of Man: Ride on the Edge 3	Xbox One	11 May 2023	Raceward Studio
TT Isle of Man: Ride on the Edge 3	Xbox Series X/S	11 May 2023	Raceward Studio
The Lord of the Rings: Gollum	Microsoft Windows	25 May 2023	Daedalic Entertainment
The Lord of the Rings: Gollum	PlayStation 4	25 May 2023	Daedalic Entertainment
The Lord of the Rings: Gollum	PlayStation 5	25 May 2023	Daedalic Entertainment
The Lord of the Rings: Gollum	Xbox One	25 May 2023	Daedalic Entertainment
The Lord of the Rings: Gollum	Xbox Series X/S	25 May 2023	Daedalic Entertainment
Pro Cycling Manager 2023	Microsoft Windows	8 June 2023	Cyanide
Tour De France 2023	Microsoft Windows	8 June 2023	Cyanide
Tour De France 2023	PlayStation 4	8 June 2023	Cyanide
Tour De France 2023	PlayStation 5	8 June 2023	Cyanide
Tour De France 2023	Xbox One	8 June 2023	Cyanide
Tour De France 2023	Xbox Series X/S	8 June 2023	Cyanide
Nova Strike	Microsoft Windows	27 July 2023	Sanuk Games
Nova Strike	Nintendo Switch	27 July 2023	Sanuk Games
Nova Strike	PlayStation 5	27 July 2023	Sanuk Games
Nova Strike	Xbox Series X/S	27 July 2023	Sanuk Games
Ad Infinitum	Microsoft Windows	14 September 2023	Hekate
Ad Infinitum	PlayStation 5	14 September 2023	Hekate
Ad Infinitum	Xbox Series X/S	14 September 2023	Hekate
Overpass 2	Microsoft Windows	28 September 2023	Neopica
Overpass 2	PlayStation 5	28 September 2023	Neopica
Overpass 2	Xbox Series X/S	28 September 2023	Neopica
Asterix & Obelix: Heroes	Microsoft Windows	5 October 2023	Big Ant Studios
Asterix & Obelix: Heroes	PlayStation 4	5 October 2023	Big Ant Studios
Asterix & Obelix: Heroes	PlayStation 5	5 October 2023	Big Ant Studios
Asterix & Obelix: Heroes	Xbox Series X/S	5 October 2023	Big Ant Studios
Cricket 24	Microsoft Windows	5 October 2023	Big Ant Studios
Cricket 24	PlayStation 4	5 October 2023	Big Ant Studios
Cricket 24	PlayStation 5	5 October 2023	Big Ant Studios
Cricket 24	Xbox One	5 October 2023	Big Ant Studios
Cricket 24	Xbox Series X/S	5 October 2023	Big Ant Studios
Cricket 24	Nintendo Switch	28 March 2024	Big Ant Studios
Hotel Life: A Resort Simulator	Microsoft Windows	12 October 2023	RingZero Game Studio
Hotel Life: A Resort Simulator	PlayStation 4	12 October 2023	RingZero Game Studio
Hotel Life: A Resort Simulator	PlayStation 5	12 October 2023	RingZero Game Studio
Hotel Life: A Resort Simulator	Xbox One	12 October 2023	RingZero Game Studio
Hotel Life: A Resort Simulator	Xbox Series X/S	12 October 2023	RingZero Game Studio
RoboCop: Rogue City	Microsoft Windows	2 November 2023	Teyon
RoboCop: Rogue City	PlayStation 5	2 November 2023	Teyon
RoboCop: Rogue City	Xbox Series X/S	2 November 2023	Teyon
Gangs of Sherwood	Microsoft Windows	30 November 2023	Appeal Studio
Gangs of Sherwood	PlayStation 5	30 November 2023	Appeal Studio
Gangs of Sherwood	Xbox Series X/S	30 November 2023	Appeal Studio
War Hospital	Microsoft Windows	11 January 2024	Brave Lamb Studio
War Hospital	PlayStation 5	11 January 2024	Brave Lamb Studio
War Hospital	Xbox Series X/S	11 January 2024	Brave Lamb Studio
Garden Life: A Cozy Simulator	Microsoft Windows	22 February 2024	stillalive studios
Garden Life: A Cozy Simulator	PlayStation 4	22 February 2024	stillalive studios
Garden Life: A Cozy Simulator	PlayStation 5	22 February 2024	stillalive studios
Garden Life: A Cozy Simulator	Xbox One	22 February 2024	stillalive studios
Garden Life: A Cozy Simulator	Xbox Series X/S	22 February 2024	stillalive studios
Garden Life: A Cozy Simulator	Nintendo Switch	14 March 2024	stillalive studios
Welcome to ParadiZe	Microsoft Windows	29 February 2024	Eko Software
Welcome to ParadiZe	PlayStation 5	29 February 2024	Eko Software
Welcome to ParadiZe	Xbox Series X/S	29 February 2024	Eko Software
Taxi Life: A City Driving Simulator	Microsoft Windows	7 March 2024	Simteract
Taxi Life: A City Driving Simulator	PlayStation 5	7 March 2024	Simteract
Taxi Life: A City Driving Simulator	Xbox Series X/S	7 March 2024	Simteract
Crown Wars: The Black Prince	Microsoft Windows	23 May 2024	Artefacts Studio
Crown Wars: The Black Prince	PlayStation 5	23 May 2024	Artefacts Studio
Crown Wars: The Black Prince	Xbox Series X/S	23 May 2024	Artefacts Studio
Crown Wars: The Black Prince	Nintendo Switch	28 November 2024	Artefacts Studio
Pro Cycling Manager 2024	Microsoft Windows	6 June 2024	Cyanide
Tour De France 2024	Microsoft Windows	6 June 2024	Cyanide
Tour De France 2024	PlayStation 4	6 June 2024	Cyanide
Tour De France 2024	PlayStation 5	6 June 2024	Cyanide
Tour De France 2024	Xbox One	6 June 2024	Cyanide
Tour De France 2024	Xbox Series X/S	6 June 2024	Cyanide
Tiebreak: Official Game of the ATP and WTA	Microsoft Windows	22 August 2024	Big Ant Studios
Tiebreak: Official Game of the ATP and WTA	PlayStation 4	22 August 2024	Big Ant Studios
Tiebreak: Official Game of the ATP and WTA	PlayStation 5	22 August 2024	Big Ant Studios
Tiebreak: Official Game of the ATP and WTA	Xbox One	22 August 2024	Big Ant Studios
Tiebreak: Official Game of the ATP and WTA	Xbox Series X/S	22 August 2024	Big Ant Studios
Tiebreak: Official Game of the ATP and WTA	Nintendo Switch	15 May 2025	Big Ant Studios
Test Drive Unlimited Solar Crown	Microsoft Windows	12 September 2024	Kylotonn
Test Drive Unlimited Solar Crown	PlayStation 5	12 September 2024	Kylotonn
Test Drive Unlimited Solar Crown	Xbox Series X/S	12 September 2024	Kylotonn
Ravenswatch	Microsoft Windows	26 September 2024	Passtech Games
Ravenswatch	PlayStation 4	28 November 2024	Passtech Games
Ravenswatch	PlayStation 5	28 November 2024	Passtech Games
Ravenswatch	Xbox One	28 November 2024	Passtech Games
Ravenswatch	Xbox Series X/S	28 November 2024	Passtech Games
Ravenswatch	Nintendo Switch	23 January 2025	Passtech Games
Ravenswatch	Nintendo Switch 2	10 December 2026	Passtech Games
Cat Rescue Story	Nintendo Switch	26 September 2024	Tivola
Cat Rescue Story	PlayStation 4	26 September 2024	Tivola
Cat Rescue Story	PlayStation 5	26 September 2024	Tivola
Cat Rescue Story	Xbox One	26 September 2024	Tivola
Cat Rescue Story	Xbox Series X/S	26 September 2024	Tivola
MXGP 24 The Official Game	Microsoft Windows	28 November 2024	Kylotonn, Artefacts Studio
MXGP 24 The Official Game	PlayStation 5	28 November 2024	Kylotonn, Artefacts Studio
MXGP 24 The Official Game	Xbox Series X/S	28 November 2024	Kylotonn, Artefacts Studio
Ambulance Life: A Paramedic Simulator	Microsoft Windows	6 February 2025	Aesir Interactive
Ambulance Life: A Paramedic Simulator	PlayStation 5	6 February 2025	Aesir Interactive
Ambulance Life: A Paramedic Simulator	Xbox Series X/S	6 February 2025	Aesir Interactive
Rugby 25	Microsoft Windows	13 February 2025	Big Ant Studios
Rugby 25	PlayStation 4	13 February 2025	Big Ant Studios
Rugby 25	PlayStation 5	13 February 2025	Big Ant Studios
Rugby 25	Xbox One	13 February 2025	Big Ant Studios
Rugby 25	Xbox Series X/S	13 February 2025	Big Ant Studios
AFL 26	Microsoft Windows	8 May 2025	Big Ant Studios
AFL 26	PlayStation 4	8 May 2025	Big Ant Studios
AFL 26	PlayStation 5	8 May 2025	Big Ant Studios
AFL 26	Xbox One	8 May 2025	Big Ant Studios
AFL 26	Xbox Series X/S	8 May 2025	Big Ant Studios
AFL 26	Nintendo Switch 2	31 March 2026	Big Ant Studios
Tour de France 2025	Microsoft Windows	5 June 2025	Cyanide
Tour de France 2025	PlayStation 5	5 June 2025	Cyanide
Tour de France 2025	Xbox Series X/S	5 June 2025	Cyanide
Pro Cycling Manager 2025	Microsoft Windows	5 June 2025	Cyanide
Architect Life: A House Design Simulator	Microsoft Windows	19 June 2025	Shine Research
Architect Life: A House Design Simulator	Nintendo Switch	19 June 2025	Shine Research
Architect Life: A House Design Simulator	PlayStation 5	19 June 2025	Shine Research
Architect Life: A House Design Simulator	Xbox Series X/S	19 June 2025	Shine Research
Rugby League 26	Microsoft Windows	17 July 2025	Big Ant Studios
Rugby League 26	PlayStation 4	17 July 2025	Big Ant Studios
Rugby League 26	PlayStation 5	17 July 2025	Big Ant Studios
Rugby League 26	Xbox One	17 July 2025	Big Ant Studios
Rugby League 26	Xbox Series X/S	17 July 2025	Big Ant Studios
RoboCop: Rogue City - Unfinished Business	Microsoft Windows	17 July 2025	Teyon
RoboCop: Rogue City - Unfinished Business	PlayStation 5	17 July 2025	Teyon
RoboCop: Rogue City - Unfinished Business	Xbox Series X/S	17 July 2025	Teyon
Hell Is Us	Microsoft Windows	4 September 2025	Rogue Factor
Hell Is Us	PlayStation 5	4 September 2025	Rogue Factor
Hell Is Us	Xbox Series X/S	4 September 2025	Rogue Factor
Hell Is Us	Nintendo Switch 2	8 October 2026	Rogue Factor
Rennsport	PlayStation 5	13 November 2025	Competition Company
Rennsport	Xbox Series X/S	13 November 2025	Competition Company
Cricket 26	Microsoft Windows	20 November 2025	Big Ant Studios
Cricket 26	PlayStation 4	20 November 2025	Big Ant Studios
Cricket 26	PlayStation 5	20 November 2025	Big Ant Studios
Cricket 26	Xbox One	20 November 2025	Big Ant Studios
Cricket 26	Xbox Series X/S	20 November 2025	Big Ant Studios
Styx: Blades of Greed	Microsoft Windows	19 February 2026	Cyanide
Styx: Blades of Greed	PlayStation 5	19 February 2026	Cyanide
Styx: Blades of Greed	Xbox Series X/S	19 February 2026	Cyanide
Gear.Club Unlimited 3	Nintendo Switch 2	19 February 2026	Eden Games
Gear.Club Unlimited 3	Microsoft Windows	8 October 2026	Eden Games
Gear.Club Unlimited 3	PlayStation 5	8 October 2026	Eden Games
Gear.Club Unlimited 3	Xbox Series X/S	8 October 2026	Eden Games
GreedFall: The Dying World	Microsoft Windows	10 March 2026	Spiders
GreedFall: The Dying World	PlayStation 5	10 March 2026	Spiders
GreedFall: The Dying World	Xbox Series X/S	10 March 2026	Spiders
Dragonkin: The Banished	Microsoft Windows	16 March 2026	Eko Software
Dragonkin: The Banished	PlayStation 5	16 March 2026	Eko Software
Dragonkin: The Banished	Xbox Series X/S	16 March 2026	Eko Software
Cthulhu: The Cosmic Abyss	Microsoft Windows	16 April 2026	Big Bad Wolf
Cthulhu: The Cosmic Abyss	PlayStation 5	16 April 2026	Big Bad Wolf
Cthulhu: The Cosmic Abyss	Xbox Series X/S	16 April 2026	Big Bad Wolf
Tour de France 2026	Microsoft Windows	4 June 2026	Cyanide
Tour de France 2026	PlayStation 5	4 June 2026	Cyanide
Tour de France 2026	Xbox Series X/S	4 June 2026	Cyanide
Pro Cycling Manager 2026	Microsoft Windows	15 June 2026	Cyanide
The Mound: Omen of Cthulhu	Microsoft Windows	15 July 2026	ACE Team
The Mound: Omen of Cthulhu	PlayStation 5	15 July 2026	ACE Team
The Mound: Omen of Cthulhu	Xbox Series X/S	15 July 2026	ACE Team
MXGP 26 The Official Game	Microsoft Windows	1 October 2026	Artefacts Studio
MXGP 26 The Official Game	PlayStation 5	1 October 2026	Artefacts Studio
MXGP 26 The Official Game	Xbox Series X/S	1 October 2026	Artefacts Studio
Hunting Simulator 3	Microsoft Windows	29 October 2026	Nacon Studio Ghent
Hunting Simulator 3	PlayStation 5	29 October 2026	Nacon Studio Ghent
Hunting Simulator 3	Xbox Series X/S	29 October 2026	Nacon Studio Ghent
Edge of Memories	Microsoft Windows	3 December 2026	Midgar Studio
Edge of Memories	PlayStation 5	3 December 2026	Midgar Studio
Edge of Memories	Xbox Series X/S	3 December 2026	Midgar Studio
Endurance Motorsport Series	Microsoft Windows	Q1/Q2 2027	Kylotonn
Endurance Motorsport Series	PlayStation 5	Q1/Q2 2027	Kylotonn
Endurance Motorsport Series	Xbox Series X/S	Q1/Q2 2027	Kylotonn
Hunter: The Reckoning – Deathwish	Microsoft Windows	Q2/Q3 2027	Teyon
Hunter: The Reckoning – Deathwish	PlayStation 5	Q2/Q3 2027	Teyon
Hunter: The Reckoning – Deathwish	Xbox Series X/S	Q2/Q3 2027	Teyon
Dracula: The Disciple	Microsoft Windows	2027	Cyanide
Dracula: The Disciple	PlayStation 5	2027	Cyanide
Dracula: The Disciple	Xbox Series X/S	2027	Cyanide
Werewolf: The Apocalypse – Rageborn	Microsoft Windows	2027	crea-ture Studios
Werewolf: The Apocalypse – Rageborn	PlayStation 5	2027	crea-ture Studios
Werewolf: The Apocalypse – Rageborn	Xbox Series X/S	2027	crea-ture Studios
Werewolf: The Apocalypse – Rageborn	Nintendo Switch 2	2027	crea-ture Studios
WRC The Official Game	Microsoft Windows	Q4 2027	Grit Games
WRC The Official Game	PlayStation 5	Q4 2027	Grit Games
WRC The Official Game	Xbox Series X/S	Q4 2027	Grit Games
Terminator: Survivors	Microsoft Windows	2027	Nacon Studio Milan
Terminator: Survivors	PlayStation 5	2027	Nacon Studio Milan
Terminator: Survivors	Xbox Series X/S	2027	Nacon Studio Milan

== Under dispute ==
The rights for the following titles are disputed, with Frogwares claiming Nacon only owns the distribution rights:

Title	Release	Developer(s)	Platform(s)
Sherlock Holmes: The Devil's Daughter	10 June 2016	Frogwares	Microsoft Windows, PlayStation 4, Xbox One
The Sinking City	27 June 2019	Frogwares	Microsoft Windows, PlayStation 4, Xbox One
