= WRC 7 =

2017 video game

- European edition cover art
- Developer: Kylotonn
- Publisher: Bigben Interactive
- Series: World Rally Championship
- Platforms: Microsoft Windows; PlayStation 4; Xbox One
- Release: WW: 15 September 2017
- Genre: Racing
- Modes: Single-player, multiplayer

WRC 7, also known as WRC 7 FIA World Rally Championship, is a racing video game based on the 2017 World Rally Championship season. The game was developed by French developer Kylotonn and published on 15 September 2017 by Bigben Interactive for Microsoft Windows, PlayStation 4 and Xbox One. The game carries an official FIA esports licence.

== Reception ==
Reception

Aggregate score
Aggregator	Score
Metacritic	70/100

Review scores
Publication	Score
4Players	65%
Eurogamer	7/10
GameSpot	7/10
IGN	7.3/10
PlayStation Official Magazine – UK	7/10
HobbyConsolas	60%

The game was released to mixed reception, with reviewers praising improvements over its predecessor but criticised the game's controls and lack of depth compared to the likes of DiRT 4. Metacritic gave it a score of 70 out of 100 for each of the three platform releases.

GameSpot said: "For all its minor faults and bare-bones nature in comparison to others, WRC 7 is still an enjoyable, but seriously challenging rally title. It's not the most welcoming game for newcomers, and even experienced racers will find some of the rougher stages tricky."

The game won the award for "Best Sports Game" at the 2017 Ping Awards.
