= WRC 5 =

2015 video game

WRC 5 FIA World Rally Championship
- European edition cover art
- Developer: Kylotonn
- Publisher: Bigben Interactive
- Director: Alain Jarniou
- Series: World Rally Championship
- Platforms: Microsoft Windows; PlayStation 3; PlayStation 4; Xbox 360; Xbox One; PlayStation Vita
- Release: WW: 13 October 2015
- Genre: Racing
- Modes: Single-player, multiplayer

WRC 5 is a racing video game based on the 2015 World Rally Championship season. The game was developed by French developer Kylotonn and published by Bigben Interactive for Microsoft Windows, PlayStation 4, PlayStation 3, Xbox One, Xbox 360, and PlayStation Vita platforms in October 2015. It is the first game in the series developed by Kylotonn. This is the final installment of WRC for PS3, PlayStation Vita, and Xbox 360.

It is the first WRC game for eighth generation consoles and, as the official video game of the 2015 World Rally Championship season, features cars and rallies from the 2015 season, including support categories, and a total of 400 km of stages. The game also featured British indie rock band Bastille's song "Pompeii" in its intro.

== Reception ==
Reception

Aggregate score
Aggregator	Score
Metacritic	PC: 65/100; PS4: 62/100; XONE: 70/100

Review scores
Publication	Score
Game Informer	60
IGN	60%
PlayStation Official Magazine – UK	70%

IGN said: "A restart from scratch for the WRC series, but does not leave a mark in the mud of the World Rally Championship". PlayStation Official Magazine – UK described the game as "rough around the edges, yet with plenty of fun to be had". Game Informer wrote: "While WRC 5 offers a decent experience, it lacks bite or any distinguishing characteristics".

The game reached number 10 in the UK retail sales chart, and number 10 in the downloads chart.
