= WRC: Rally Evolved =

2005 video game

- Cover art featuring Subaru Impreza WRC
- Developer: Evolution Studios
- Publisher: Sony Computer Entertainment
- Series: WRC
- Platform: PlayStation 2
- Release: AU: 27 October 2005; EU: 28 October 2005
- Genre: Racing
- Modes: Single-player, multiplayer

WRC: Rally Evolved (also known as WRC 5 and WRC 2005) is a 2005 racing video game developed by Evolution Studios and published by Sony Computer Entertainment for the PlayStation 2. It is the fifth video game to be officially licensed by the FIA World Rally Championship, while also the last to be released by Sony and exclusive to PlayStation consoles. The game is based on the 2005 WRC season.

== Gameplay ==
Rally Evolved is a significant update to the series. A notable change is the "random event" engine in the game, which creates random hazards which the player must navigate as they drive the course. These random events can be anything from rockfalls from cliffs above, animals on the track or even rivers or pipes spilling water on the road surface, making it slippery. However, some random events are an advantage to the player - other (AI) drivers are on the course (although this is rare as this is not a common occurrence in the real WRC), and the player can pass them (thus beating them on the course). Also, the co-driver keeps players updated on other cars, and occasionally other cars crash and retire from the rally (players can often spot wrecked or overturned cars at the trackside, complete with co-drivers warning about the cars having struck misfortune).

WRC: Rally Evolved also features new sets of cars, including "Historic" vehicles, essentially the highly tuned Group B rally cars including the Ford RS200, the Renault 5 Turbo and the Peugeot 205 Turbo 16 E2. In a quick race, the player will play a randomly selected stage with a randomly selected car and driver. During the race, the player will have to beat a time trial (although this is not needed to advance in the game). The time target will be the in-game time at the first attempt. If beaten, the time target will be the personal best with a specific car class. The Championship mode lets the player play through the 2005 WRC season. The player can choose between a real life calendar, that follows the schedule for the 2005 WRC season, or a non-real life calendar, where the player can choose the countries to play in a wanted order. Championship mode ends when all 16 countries are played, but the player can stop playing after any country, because the game saves after each country is finished. The player can play all three stages in a country, but normally the player will have to buy the stage to play it in other modes.

In a single rally, the player will play all the three stages in a selected country. Unlike the quick race, in a single stage the player will play one stage of own choice. The player can also select car and driver. In rally cross, the player will play against three AI generated opponents in a SSX course from any of the countries. The goal is to finish first in a circular track with all classes of cars. In historical challenge, the player has to race on a small part of a stage to beat a specific time. The player will have to choose between six cars and race first for bronze, then silver and gold.

== Reception ==
Reception

Aggregate scores
Aggregator	Score
GameRankings	80%
Metacritic	80/100

Review scores
Publication	Score
Computer and Video Games	8/10
Eurogamer	6/10
GamesMaster	85%
PlayStation Official Magazine – UK	9/10
PALGN	7.5/10
Play	88%
PSM3	89%
VideoGamer.com	8/10

The game received "favorable" reviews according to the review aggregation website Metacritic.

== See also ==
- World Rally Championship (video game series)
- WRC: FIA World Rally Championship (2010 video game)
