= Colin McRae Rally 3 =

2002 video game

- European cover art
- Developer: Codemasters
- Publisher: Codemasters
- Series: Colin McRae Rally
- Platforms: PlayStation 2, Xbox, Windows
- Release: PlayStation 2: PAL: 25 October 2002; NA: 15 April 2003; Xbox: PAL: 25 October 2002; NA: 25 February 2003; Windows: EU: 13 June 2003
- Genre: Racing
- Modes: Single-player, multiplayer

Colin McRae Rally 3 is a 2002 racing video game developed and published by Codemasters for Xbox, PlayStation 2 and Microsoft Windows. It features rally cars from the 2002 World Rally Championship. Both the PlayStation 2 and Xbox versions were supposed to be released in North America on 10 December 2002, but their releases were delayed a few times before the latter version was settled for February 2003, and the former version for April. A GameCube version was also announced, but was never released.

== Reception ==
Reception

Aggregate score
Aggregator	Score		
Aggregator	PC	PS2	Xbox
Metacritic	83/100	86/100	86/100

Review scores
Publication	Score		
Publication	PC	PS2	Xbox
Edge	N/A	8/10	8/10
Electronic Gaming Monthly	N/A	N/A	9/10
Eurogamer	6/10	N/A	8/10
Game Informer	N/A	8.75/10	8.75/10
GameRevolution	N/A	B+	N/A
GameSpot	N/A	8.3/10	8.6/10
GameSpy	N/A	4/5	4/5
GameZone	N/A	8.9/10	8.8/10
IGN	N/A	8.9/10	8.9/10
Official U.S. PlayStation Magazine	N/A	5/5	N/A
Official Xbox Magazine (US)	N/A	N/A	8.8/10
PC Gamer (UK)	80%	N/A	N/A
X-Play	N/A	4/5	N/A
BBC Sport	N/A	90%	N/A

Colin McRae Rally 3 received "generally favourable reviews" on all platforms, according to review aggregator Metacritic.

IGN and GameSpot wrote positively of the game, praising improvements made in the handling, sense of speed, collision system, graphics, sound, and car customization over its predecessor, while criticizing its lack of substantial content. A lot of magazines and GameSpy gave the game favorable reviews, the former while the Xbox version was still in development, and the latter while the PlayStation 2 version was still in development.

Air Hendrix of GamePro's January 2003 issue said of the Xbox version in an early review, "Only the restrictive Championship mode and the nature of Rally racing itself (one car soloing on the trach at a time, best result wins) confines the appeal of McRae 3—it's a racer's game, not a gamer's game. If that's you, McRae 3 is as alluring as a gleaming, freshly-waxed sports car." (Note: GamePro gave the Xbox version two 4.5/5 scores for graphics and fun factor, 4/5 for sound, and 5/5 for control in an early review.) Five issues later, he said of the PlayStation 2 version, "The feel of the driving is what earned the McRae series its reputation, and the controls remain impeccable in this PS2 edition." (Note: GamePro gave the PlayStation 2 version two 4.5/5 scores for graphics and fun factor, 4/5 for sound, and 5/5 for control.)
