= List of video games developed in Portugal =

This is a list of released and upcoming video games that are developed in Portugal.

Title	Developer	Publisher	Year	Platform
8 Ball Pool	Miniclip Portugal	Miniclip	2010	Android, Facebook and iOS
A Walk in the Dark	Flying Turtle Software		2012	Windows
Alekhine's Gun	Bigmoon Entertainment	Maximum Games	2016	PS4, Xbox One
Alentejo: Tinto's Law	Loading Studios	Teknamic Software®	2024 (web browser), 2025 (GB Cartridge)	Game Boy, Web Browser
Alien Evolution	Marco Paulo Carrasco / Rui Manuel Tito	Gremlin Graphics Software	1987	ZX Spectrum
Arc Seed	Massive Galaxy Studios	Massive Galaxy Studios	TBA	Windows
Astro Empires	Cybertopia Studios	Cybertopia Studios	2006	Android and Browser
Billabong Surf Trip	Biodroid	Chillingo	2010	Android and iOS
Bobo and the Chest of Nightmares	Polycast Labs	Polycast Labs	2026	Windows, Xbox One
Call of Cthulhu	Bigmoon Entertainment	Saber Interactive, Focus Home	2019	Nintendo Switch
Cristiano Ronaldo Freestyle	Biodroid	Iceberg Interactive	2012	Android, iOS, Mac OS X, and Windows
Crysis Remastered Trilogy	Saber Porto	Saber Interactive, Crytek	2021	PC, PS4, Xbox One
Dakar 18	Bigmoon Entertainment	Bigmoon Entertainment, Koch Media	2018	PC, PS4, Xbox One
Dakar Desert Rally	Saber Porto	Saber Interactive	2022	PC, PS4, PS5, Xbox One, Xbox Series
Demons Age	Bigmoon Entertainment	Bigmoon Entertainment	2017	PS4, Xbox One, PC
Detective Case and Clown Bot in: Murder in the Hotel Lisbon	Nerd Monkeys	Nerd Monkeys	2013, 2015 (iOS), 2020 (Switch)	Linux, Mac OS X, Windows, Nintendo Switch, iOS
Detective Case and Clown Bot in: The Express Killer	Nerd Monkeys	Nerd Monkeys	2018	Linux, Mac OS X, Windows
Elifoot	André Elias		1987	Android, DOS, iOS, Windows and ZX Spectrum
Emitters - Drone Invasions	HYTEK94	Emitters	2018	Windows, Linux
Falcao vs Aliens	Wingz Studio	Marmalade Play	2014	Android and iOS
Fangz	Game Whizzes	Game Whizzes	2013	Android, BlackBerry 10, BlackBerry PlayBook OS and iOS
FlatOut4: Total Insanity	Bigmoon Entertainment	Kylotonn, Bigben Interactive, Strategy First	2017	PS4, Xbox One
Floribella	Move Interactive	SIC	2007	Windows
For The Warp	Massive Galaxy Studios	Massive Galaxy Studios	2022	Windows, Nintendo Switch
Fragger	Miniclip Portugal	Miniclip	2010	Android, iOS
Gambys	Viagem Interactive	Potidata	1995	DOS
Gravity Guy	Miniclip Portugal	Miniclip	2010	Android, iOS, Mac OS X, MeeGo, Symbian OS, Windows and Windows Phone
Greedy Guns	Tio Atum		2014	Linux, Mac OS X and Windows
Guardians of Arcadia - Episode I	FABULA EPICA	FABULA EPICA	2016	Android, iOS, Mac OS X, Windows and Windows Phone
Guess What!	DreamStudios	DreamStudios	2015	Android
Halls of Darkness	Unspeakable Studios		2015	Android
Hush	Game Studio 78	TheGameWall Studios	2015	PlayStation 4, Xbox One, Wii U and Windows
Hysteria Hospital: Emergency Ward	GameInvest/Camel Entertainment	Oxygen Games	2009	Nintendo DS, Wii and Windows
Interstellar Space: Genesis	Praxis Games	Praxis Games	2019	Windows, Mac, Linux
Jagged Alliance: Back in Action	Bigmoon Entertainment	bitComposer Entertainment	2014	Mac, Linux
Johnny Scraps: Clash of Dimensions	Immersive Douro		2014	Android, iOS, Ouya and Windows Phone
Johnny Scraps: Tap & Slash	Immersive Douro		2014	Android, iOS and Windows Phone
LakeSide	Massive Galaxy Studios	Massive Galaxy Studios	2022	Windows
Let's Play Pet Hospitals	Biodroid	Deep Silver	2008	Nintendo DS e Windows
Lex Ferrum	YDreams/Blueshark Studio	YDreams	2001	N-Gage
Lichdom: Battlemage	Bigmoon Entertainment	Maximum Games	2016	PS4, Xbox One
Little Goody Two Shoes	AstralShiftPro	Square Enix	2023	Nintendo Switch, PS5, Windows and Xbox Series S/X
Massive Galaxy	Massive Galaxy Studios	Massive Galaxy Studios	TBA	Windows
MegaRamp: Skate Rivals	Biodroid		2014	Android, iOS and Windows Phone
MegaRamp: The Game	Biodroid		2012	Android and iOS
Megatron	Marco Paulo Carrasco	Wizard Software	1984	ZX Spectrum
Miffy’s World	Biodroid	Biodroid	2010	Wii
Mine Base: Chess & Checkers	CodeRunners	Gameolith	2012	Android, BlackBerry 10, BlackBerry PlayBook OS and iOS
Monkey Split (video game)	Nerd Monkeys	Nerd Monkeys	2021	Windows
Moon Defenders	Marco Paulo Carrasco	Wizard Software	1984	ZX Spectrum
MotoGP 13	Bigmoon Entertainment	Milestone	2013	PS3, Xbox 360
Mr. Gulp	Marco Paulo Carrasco	Wizard Software	1984	ZX Spectrum
Munin	Gojira / The Indigent Studio	Daedalic Entertainment	2014	Windows, Mac OS X, Linux, Android, iOS and Windows Phone
Neighbors from Hell	Bigmoon Entertainment	THQ Nordic	2017	PC, MacOS, Linux, Android, iOS
Neighbours from Hell 2: On Vacation	Bigmoon Entertainment	THQ Nordic	2017	iOS, Android, macOS
North & South: The Game	Bigmoon Entertainment	bitComposer Entertainment	2012	PC, Win8, IOS, Android
Orion's Belt	Pedro Santos and Nuno Silva		2009	Browser
Out of Line (video game)	Nerd Monkeys	Hatinh Interactive	2021	Windows, PS4, Xbox One, Nintendo Switch
Package Inc - Cargo Simulator	Infinity Games, Nerd Monkeys, Little Interactions	Infinity Games, Nerd Monkeys	2020, 2022 (Switch)	Nintendo Switch, Android, iOS
Paradise Café	Damatta		1985	ZX Spectrum
Planetarium Manager	Planetarium Games	Planetarium Games	2002	Browser
PinballYeah!	CodeRunners	Interplay	2010	Android, MAC OS X, iOS and Windows
Police Simulator: Patrol Duty	Bigmoon Entertainment	Astragon Entertainment	2019	PC
Portugal 1111: A Conquista de Soure	Ciberbit	Visão	2004	Windows
Quest of Dungeons	Upfall Studios	Upfall Studios	2014	Xbox One, Windows, MAC OS X, Nintendo 3DS, Nintendo Switch, Linux, Wii U, iOS and Android
R3: Ridiculous Road Racing	Seed Studios	Seed Studios	2011	iOS
Rail Rush	Silent Bay Studios/Miniclip Portugal	Miniclip	2012	Android, iOS and Windows Phone
Railways - Train Simulator	Nerd Monkeys, Infinity Games	Nerd Monkeys, Infinity Games	2020 (Android), 2022 (Switch), 2023 (Windows)	Windows, Nintendo Switch, Android
Rockababy Airlines	The Indigent Studio	The Indigent Studio	2015	Browser
SGC - Short Games Collection#1	Multiple developers	Nerd Monkeys	2021	Nintendo Switch
Shrooms	Immersive Douro		2015	Linux and Windows
Slide Tap Pop	CodeRunners	CodeRunners	2013	Android, BlackBerry 10, BlackBerry PlayBook OS, iOS, Mac OS X, Ouya and Windows
Slinki	Titan Forged Games	TheGameWall Studios	2015	Windows and Linux
Smash IT! Adventures	Bica Studios	Thumbstar Games	2014	Android and iOS
Smithy Shop (video game)	Nerd Monkeys	Nerd Monkeys	TBA	Windows
Stand Up Clown (2015 video game) (Note: Stand Up Clown was a free 2015 minigame demo of 2014 title, Detective Case and Clown Bot in: Murder in the Hotel Lisbon for mobile platforms. It is now delisted.)	Nerd Monkeys	Nerd Monkeys	2015	iOS, Android
StringZ	Wingz Studio	Wingz Studio	2012	iOS and Mac OS X
Sudoku for Kids	Seed Studios	Individual Software	2007	Nintendo DS
Super Sorrisos	Biodroid		2009	Browser
Survival Ball	Rockbyte Software		2018	Windows and Mac OS X
Syndrome	Bigmoon Entertainment	Bigmoon Entertainment	2017	PS4, Xbox One, PC
Tanks Meet Zombies	Titan Forged Games	Titan Forged Games	2018	Windows
The Activision Decathlon	Biodroid	Activision/Marmalade Play	2013	Android, iOS, BlackBerry 10, BlackBerry PlayBook OS, Tizen and Windows Phone
To Bee or Not to Bee	Wingz Studio	Wingz Studio	2014	iOS and Mac OS X
Toy Shop Tycoon	Seed Studios/GameInvest	Codemasters/Majesco	2008	Nintendo DS
Traffix (video game)	Infinity Games	Infinity Games, Nerd Monkeys	2019, 2020 (Switch)	Mac OS X, Windows, Nintendo Switch, Android, iOS
Trapped Dead: Lockdown	Bigmoon Entertainment	Head Up games	2015	PC
Ugo Volt	Move Interactive		2007 (Cancelled)	Xbox 360 and Windows
Under Siege	Seed Studios	Sony Computer Entertainment	2011	PlayStation 3
Voltaire: The Vegan Vampire	Digitality Games	indie.io	2023	Windows
WRC 3: FIA World Rally Championship	Bigmoon Entertainment	Milestone	2012	PS3, Xbox 360
WRC 5	Bigmoon Entertainment	Kylotonn, Bigben Interactive	2015	PS4, Xbox One
WRC Shakedown	Bigmoon Entertainment	Milestone	2013	PC, Xbox 360, PS3
Outsider: After Life	Once A Bird	Once A Bird	2020	PC, iOS
