= Chihiro Onitsuka discography =

- Studio albums: 7
- Compilation albums: 5
- Singles: 20
- Video albums: 7

The discography of Chihiro Onitsuka consists of six studio albums, one cover album, five compilation albums, 20 singles and seven video albums. These were released under Toshiba EMI between 2000 and 2003, Universal Music Japan from 2004 to 2010, For Life Music Entertainment from 2011 to 2012, and on her personal record label, Napoleon Records, from 2013.

== Albums ==
=== Studio albums ===
List of albums, with selected chart positions
Title	Album details	Peak positions		Sales	Certifications
Title	Album details	JPN	TWN East Asian (Note: The G-Music chart was established in July 2005 and only archives the top 20 releases.) (Note: Positions were taken from 2005 week 37, 2007 week 46, 2009 week 45, 2010 week 19, 2011 week 24.)	Sales	Certifications
Insomnia	Released: March 7, 2001; Label: Virgin Tokyo; Formats: CD, digital download	1	—	1,345,000	RIAJ: Million (Note: Insomnia later received a 3× Platinum certification for 1,200,000 copies, however the 3× Platinum threshold was changed to 750,000 copies in 2003.)
This Armor	Released: March 6, 2002; Label: Virgin Tokyo; Formats: CD, digital download	3	—	510,000	RIAJ: Platinum
Sugar High	Released: December 11, 2002; Label: Virgin Tokyo; Formats: CD, 2CD, digital download	2	—	295,000	RIAJ: Gold
Las Vegas	Released: October 31, 2007; Label: Universal Sigma; Formats: CD, CD+DVD, digital download	6	1	47,000	
Dorothy	Released: October 28, 2009; Label: Universal Sigma; Formats: CD, CD+DVD, digital download	10	4	23,000	
Ken to Kaede (剣と楓; "Blades and Maples")	Released: April 20, 2011; Label: For Life Music Entertainment; Formats: CD, digital download	16	17	11,000	
Tricky Sisters Magic Burger	As Chihiro Onitsuka & Billys Sandwitches; Released: September 24, 2014; Label: Space Shower Music; Formats: CD, digital download	62	—	2,000	
Syndrome	Released: February 1, 2017; Label: Victor; Formats: CD, CD+DVD, digital download	15	—	11,000	
Hysteria	Released: November 25, 2020; Label: Victor; Formats: CD, CD+DVD, CD+Blu-ray, digital download	25	1	4,000	

=== Live album ===
List of albums, with selected chart positions
Title	Album details	Peak positions	Sales
Title	Album details	JPN	Sales
Tiny Screams	Released: June 21, 2017; Label: Victor; Formats: CD, digital download	22	

=== Cover album ===
List of albums, with selected chart positions
Title	Album details	Peak positions	Sales
Title	Album details	JPN	Sales
Famous Microphone	Released: May 30, 2012; Label: For Life; Formats: CD, digital download	34	4,000

=== Compilation albums ===
List of albums, with selected chart positions
Title	Album details	Peak positions		Sales	Certifications
Title	Album details	JPN	TWN East Asian	Sales	Certifications
Onitsuka Chihiro Single Box (鬼束ちひろ シングルBOX, Onitsuka Chihiro Shinguru Bokkusu)	Box collection compiling singles from 2000 to 2004; Released: March 17, 2004; Label: Virgin Tokyo; Formats: 10CD	112	—	3,000	
The Ultimate Collection	Released: December 1, 2004; Label: Virgin Tokyo; Formats: CD, digital download	3	2	232,000	RIAJ: Platinum
Singles 2000-2003	Released: September 7, 2005; Label: Virgin Tokyo; Formats: CD, digital download	7	—	66,000	
One of Pillars: Best of Chihiro Onitsuka 2000-2010	Released: April 28, 2010; Label: Universal Sigma; Formats: CD, digital download	13	14	16,000	
Good Bye Train: All Time Best 2000-2013	Released: December 10, 2013; Label: Universal; Formats: 2CD, digital download	68	—	3,000	
Requiem and Silence	Released: February 20, 2020; Label: Victor; Formats: CD, 2CD, 4CD	12	—	5,160	

== Singles ==
List of singles, with selected chart positions
Title	Year	Peak chart positions		Sales	Certifications	Album
Title	Year	JPN	JPN Hot 100 (Note: The Japan Hot 100 was established in February 2008.)	Sales	Certifications	Album
"Shine"	2000	—	—	—		Insomnia
"Gekkō"	2000	11	58 (Note: Charted in 2014.)	561,000	RIAJ (physical): Platinum; RIAJ (download): 2× Platinum; RIAJ (streaming): Gold	Insomnia
"Cage"	2000	15	—	85,000		Insomnia
"Memai"	2001	6	—	253,000	RIAJ (physical): Gold	Insomnia
"Edge"	2001	6	—	253,000		Insomnia
"Infection"	2001	5	—	172,000	RIAJ (physical): Gold	This Armor
"Little Beat Rifle"	2001	5	—	172,000	RIAJ (physical): Gold	This Armor
"Ryūseigun"	2002	7	—	112,000	RIAJ (physical): Platinum; RIAJ (digital): Gold	This Armor
"Sign"	2003	4	—	65,000	RIAJ (physical): Gold	Singles 2000-2003
"Beautiful Fighter"	2003	9	—	36,000	RIAJ (physical): Gold	Singles 2000-2003
"Ii Hi Tabidachi, Nishi e"	2003	4	—	83,000	RIAJ (physical): Gold	Singles 2000-2003
"Watashi to Waltz o"	2003	8	—	66,000	RIAJ (physical): Gold	Singles 2000-2003
"Sodatsu Zassō"	2004	10	—	30,000		Non-album single
"Everyhome"	2007	9	—	29,000		Las Vegas
"Bokura Barairo no Hibi"	2007	13	—	14,000		Las Vegas
"Hotaru"	2008	11	71	18,000		Dorothy
"X"	2009	11	—	14,000		Dorothy
"Last Melody"	2009	11	—	14,000		Dorothy
"Kaerimichi o Nakushite"	2009	13	—	9,000		Dorothy
"Kagerō"	2009	13	—	7,000		Dorothy
"Aoi Tori"	2011	25	—	3,000		Ken to Kaede
"Itazura Pierrot"	2013	—	—	—		Good Bye Train
"This Silence Is Mine"	2013	36	—	3,000		Non-album single
"Anata to Science" (Note: As Chihiro Onitsuka & Billys Sandwitches)	2013	36	—	3,000		Tricky Sisters Magic Burger
"Inori ga Kotoba ni Kawaru Koro"	2014	—N/a	—	—		Tricky Sisters Magic Burger
"Star Light Letter"	2015	—N/a	—	—		Non-album single
"Good Bye My Love"	2016	35	—	3,000		Syndrome
"Hinagiku"	2018	35	—	3,000		Requiem and Silence
"End of the World"	2019	—N/a	—			Requiem and Silence
"Kakikake no Tegami"	2019	—N/a	—			Requiem and Silence
"Yuutsu na Taiyou Taikutsu na Tsuki"	2020	—N/a	—			Hysteria
"Yakeru Kawa"	2020	—N/a	—			Hysteria
"Slow Dance"	2021	77 (Note: The two versions of the single charted separately on the Oricon Weekly Singles Chart, the standard version peaking at number 77 and the limited version peaking at number 114. On the Billboard Japan Top Singles Sales, the single peaked at number 49.)	—	1,000		TBA
"Seishun no Kage"	2024	—	—			Black Fantasia (Note: Technically, the song was first included in one of the discs of the 2024 box set Un Amnesiac Girl: First Code (2000-2003); this disc was subsequently released as a stand-alone record under the name Black Fantasia.)

=== Promotional singles ===
Title	Year	Peak chart positions	Album
Title	Year	Billboard Japan Hot 100	Album
"Rollin'"	2002	—	This Armor
"Ibara no Umi"	2002	—	This Armor
"King of Solitude"	2002	—	Sugar High
"Castle Imitation"	2002	—	Sugar High
"Koe"	2003	—	Sugar High
"Steal This Heart"	2009	—	Dorothy

== Video albums ==
=== Music video collections ===
List of media, with selected chart positions
Title	Album details	Peak positions JPN
Me and My Devil	Released: April 11, 2001; Label: Virgin Tokyo; Formats: DVD, digital download	2
Princess Believer	Released: December 11, 2002; Label: Virgin Tokyo; Formats: DVD, digital download	12
The Complete Clips	Released: December 1, 2004; Label: Virgin Tokyo; Formats: DVD, digital download	9
Hard Red Fantasia	Released: June 30, 2010; Label: Universal Sigma; Formats: DVD, digital download	53

=== Live concerts ===
List of media, with selected chart positions
Title	Album details	Peak positions JPN
Cradle on My Noise Live: Live Insomnia Video Edition	Released: November 7, 2001; Label: Virgin Tokyo; Formats: DVD, digital download	3
Ultimate Crash '02 Live at Budokan	Released: May 21, 2003; Label: Virgin Tokyo; Formats: DVD, digital download	9
Nine Dirts and Snow White Flickers	Released: August 6, 2008; Label: Universal Sigma; Formats: DVD, digital download	11
Hotel Murderess of Arizona My Gun	Released: March 14, 2012; Label: For Life; Formats: DVD, digital download	26
Endless Lesson	Released: November 29, 2017; Label: Victor; Formats: DVD, Blu-ray	43
Hush Hush Loud	Released: March 20, 2019; Label: Victor; Formats: DVD+CD, Blu-ray+CD	62
