= Munin =

Munin may refer to:

- Muninn, a raven in Norse mythology—see Huginn and Muninn
  - HSwMS Munin, several ships of the Swedish Navy named after the mythological raven
  - Munin, a half-scale Gokstad ship replica in Vancouver, B.C., Canada named after the mythological raven
  - Munin (satellite), Swedish nanosatellite named after the mythological raven
  - Munin (software), Norwegian open-source software named after the mythological raven
  - Munin (video game), video game named after the mythological raven
  - Munin, fictional Marvel character based on the mythological raven, see Hugin and Munin (Marvel Comics)

== People ==
- Munin Barua (1946–2018), Indian film director
- Munin Saiprasart (born 1988), Thai cartoonist
- Iliya Munin (born 1993), Bulgarian footballer
