= Hysteria (disambiguation) =

Hysteria is a colloquial term for ungovernable emotional excess and can refer to a temporary state of mind or emotion.

Hysteria or Histeria may also refer to:

== Science ==
=== Biology and medicine ===
- Female hysteria, a once common diagnosis for women

== Music ==
- Hysteria (The Human League album), a 1984 album
- Hysteria (Def Leppard album), a 1987 album
- "Hysteria" (Def Leppard song), a 1987 song
- "Hysteria" (Muse song), a 2003 song
- "Hysteria" (Anna Abreu song), a 2011 song
- Hysteria (Katharine McPhee album), a 2015 album
- Hysteria, a 2020 album by Chihiro Onitsuka
- "Hysteria", a 1999 song by Le Knight Club from record label Crydamoure
- "Hysteria", a 2021 song by Poppy from Flux (Poppy album)
- "Hysteria", a 2026 song by Bebe Rexha from Dirty Blonde

== Film and television ==
- Hysteria (1965 film), a British film directed by Freddie Francis
- Hysteria (1997 film), a British-Canadian film directed by Rene Daalder
- Hysteria (2011 film), a British film directed by Tanya Wexler
- Hysteria!, an American comedy horror-thriller series
- Hysteria (2025 film), a German film directed by Mehmet Akif Büyükatalay

== Other uses ==
- Hysteria (periodical), a British feminist publication
- Hysteria (play), by Terry Johnson, 1993
- Hysteria (video game), 1987 video game developed by Special FX Software
- Hysteria Reinw., a synonym of Corymborkis, an orchid genus
- Hysteria, a fictional organism in the TV program Extraterrestrial
- Hysteria, a comedy show series for the Terrence Higgins Trust

== See also ==
- Histeria (disambiguation)
- Hysteresis, the dependence of the state of a system on its history
- Hysteron proteron, a rhetorical device
- Four discourses, a concept by Jacques Lacan, including "Hysteric"
- Mass psychogenic illness, or mass hysteria
- Studies on Hysteria, an 1895 book by Sigmund Freud
