= Syndrome (disambiguation) =

In medicine, a syndrome is a set of correlated signs and symptoms.

Syndrome may also refer to:

== Arts and media ==
- Syndrome (The Incredibles), a fictional character
- Syndrome (video game series)
- Syndrome (TV series), a 2012 South Korean medical drama series
- Syndrome (video game), a 2016 survival horror game for PC and consoles
- Syndrome (Chihiro Onitsuka album), 2017
- Syndrome (Wonho album), 2025

== Other uses ==
- Syndrome decoding, in coding theory
- Pollination syndrome, evolved flower traits
