= Requiem and Silence =

Compilation album by Chihiro Onitsuka
- Released: February 20, 2020
- Recorded: 1999–2020
- Genre: J-pop; rock
- Label: Victor

Chihiro Onitsuka chronology
Tiny Screams (2019)	Requiem and Silence (2020)

Singles from Requiem and Silence
- 1. "Inori ga Kotoba ni Kawaru Koro" Released: May 28, 2014; 2. "Hinagiku" Released: August 22, 2018; 3. "End of the World" Released: March 27, 2019

Requiem and Silence (stylized in all caps) is the fifth greatest hits album by Japanese singer-songwriter Chihiro Onitsuka. It was released on February 20, 2020 through Victor Entertainment. The album was released in three different editions, standard and limited, and premium collector's edition. The album includes a new track: "Kakikake no Tegami".

== Track listing ==
All tracks are written by Chihiro Onitsuka, except where noted.

Standard edition
No.	Title	Arranger(s)	Length
1.	"Gekkō"	Takefumi Haketa
2.	"Memai"	Haketa
3.	"Infection"	Haketa
4.	"Ryūseigun"	Haketa
5.	"Ii Hi Tabidachi, Nishi e" (lyrics and music written by Shinji Tanimura)	Haketa
6.	"Watashi to Waltz o"	Haketa
7.	"Everyhome"	Takeshi Kobayashi
8.	"Hotaru"	Masayuki Sakamoto
9.	"Last Melody"	Sakamoto
10.	"Aoi Tori"	Eric Gorfain
11.	"Good Bye My Love"	Masato Suzuki
12.	"Hinagiku"	Sakamoto
13.	"End of the World"	Shū Kanematsu
14.	"Kakikake no Tegami"	Sakamoto

Disc 1 – Hallelujah (Limited/premium collector's edition)
No.	Title	Arranger(s)	Length
1.	"Shine"	Takefumi Haketa
2.	"Gekkō"	Haketa
3.	"Cage"	Haketa
4.	"Memai"	Haketa
5.	"Edge"	Haketa
6.	"Infection"	Haketa
7.	"Little Beat Rifle"	Haketa
8.	"Ryūseigun"	Haketa
9.	"Sign"	Haketa
10.	"Beautiful Fighter"	Haketa
11.	"Ii Hi Tabidachi, Nishi e" (lyrics and music written by Shinji Tanimura)	Haketa
12.	"Watashi to Waltz o"	Haketa
13.	"Sodatsu Zassō"	Hideyuki Fukasawa
14.	"Everyhome"	Takeshi Kobayashi
15.	"Bokura Barairo no Hibi"	Takeshi Kobayashi; Shika Udai

Disc 2 – Universe (Limited/premium collector's edition)
No.	Title	Arranger(s)	Length
1.	"Hotaru"	Masayuki Sakamoto
2.	"X"	Sakamoto
3.	"Last Melody"	Sakamoto
4.	"Kaerimichi o Nakushite"	Sakamoto
5.	"Kagerō"	Sakamoto
6.	"Aoi Tori"	Eric Gorfain
7.	"Itazura Pierrot"	Shōichi Tomomori
8.	"This Silence Is Mine"	Keiichi Okabe
9.	"Inori ga Kotoba ni Kawaru Koro"	Gorfain
10.	"Good Bye My Love"	Masato Suzuki
11.	"Hinagiku"	Sakamoto
12.	"Twilight Dreams"	Sakamoto
13.	"End of the World"	Shū Kanematsu
14.	"Kakikake no Tegami"	Sakamoto

Disc 3 – Encore (Premium collector's edition)
No.	Title	Arranger(s)	Length
1.	"Call"	Takefumi Haketa
2.	"Hyōryū no Hane"	Haketa
3.	"Magical World"	Takeshi Kobayashi
4.	"Storyteller"	Masayuki Sakamoto
5.	"Natsu no Tsumi"	Haketa
6.	"Dining Chicken"	Haketa
7.	"Tiger in My Love"	Haketa
8.	"Crow"	Haketa
9.	"Gensōkyoku"	Masato Suzuki
10.	"Anata to SciencE" (lyrics written by Chihiro Onitsuka and Billy Sandwiches)	Chihiro Onitsuka and Billy Sandwiches
11.	"Ever After"	Sakamoto
12.	"Hide and Scream"	Sakamoto
13.	"Boku wo Wasurenaide"	Sakamoto
14.	"Hi no Tori"	Suzuki
15.	"Venus"	Sakamoto

Disc 4 – Testimony (Premium collector's edition)
No.	Title	Arranger(s)	Length
1.	"Gekkō" (Instrumental)	Takefumi Haketa
2.	"Memai" (Instrumental)	Haketa
3.	"Ryūseigun" (Instrumental)	Haketa
4.	"Ii Hi Tabidachi, Nishi e" (Instrumental)	Haketa
5.	"Watashi to Waltz o" (Instrumental)	Haketa
6.	"Hotaru" (Instrumental)	Masayuki Sakamoto
9.	"Last Melody" (Instrumental)	Sakamoto
10.	"Aoi Tori" (Instrumental)	Eric Gorfain
11.	"Good Bye My Love" (Instrumental)	Masato Suzuki
12.	"Hinagiku" (Instrumental)	Sakamoto
13.	"End of the World" (Instrumental)	Shū Kanematsu
14.	"Kakikake no Tegami" (Instrumental)	Sakamoto

== Charts ==
Sales chart performance for Requiem and Silence
Chart (2020)	Peak position
Japanese Albums (Oricon)	12

== Release history ==
List of release dates, showing region, edition(s), format(s), record label(s) and reference(s).
Region	Date	Edition(s)	Format(s)	Label(s)	Catalog num.
Japan	February 20, 2020	Standard	CD	Victor Entertainment	VICL-65358
Japan	February 20, 2020	Limited	2CD	Victor Entertainment	VICL-65356/7
Japan	February 20, 2020	Premium collector's edition	4SHM-CD	Victor Entertainment	VIZL-1734
