= Hysterical =

Hysterical or Hysterics may refer to:

- Hysteria, unmanageable emotional excesses
- Hysterical (1983 film), a film from Embassy Pictures
- Hysterical (2021 film), a documentary film
- Hysterical (podcast), a documentary podcast

== Music ==
- Hysterics (band), also known as the Love-Ins, Where the Action Is! Los Angeles Nuggets 1965–1968
- Hysterical (album), the third album by Clap Your Hands Say Yeah
- Hysterics (Rolo Tomassi album), 2008
- Hysterics (Nightingales album), 1983

== See also ==
- Hysteresis, the dependence of the state of a system on its history
- Hysteria (disambiguation)
