= The Complete Clips =

Video by Chihiro Onitsuka
- Released: December 1, 2004
- Genre: J-pop
- Label: Toshiba-EMI

the complete clips is a DVD compilation of music videos by Japanese pop singer/songwriter Chihiro Onitsuka, released by Toshiba-EMI on December 1, 2004, the same day as her compilation album The Ultimate Collection. The DVD contains seventeen music videos, taken from Onitsuka's three previous albums and their related singles. It is also not region-specific, meaning it can be played on most DVD players irrespective of the player's region.

A large portion of these videos were previously collected on Onitsuka's earlier music video compilations, Me and My Devil and Princess Believer; only the last four videos are newly presented on DVD.

== Track listing ==
All music and lyrics written by Chihiro Onitsuka except "Ii Hi Tabidachi - Nishi e", composed and written by Shinji Tanimura. All arrangements by Takefumi Haketa except "We can go", arranged by Nozomu Tsuchiya and Takefumi Haketa.

1. "SHINE (unplugged)" (シャイン)
2. "Gekkou" (月光)
3. "Cage"
4. "Memai" (眩暈)
5. "edge"
6. "We can go"
7. "Gekkou (album version)" (月光)
8. "LITTLE BEAT RIFLE"
9. "ROLLIN'"
10. "Ryuuseigun" (流星群)
11. "Ibara no Umi" (茨の海)
12. "infection"
13. "King of Solitude"
14. "Sign"
15. "Beautiful Fighter"
16. "Watashi to WALTZ wo" (私とワルツを)
17. "Ii Hi Tabidachi - Nishi e" (いい日旅立ち・西へ)

== Personnel ==
- "SHINE (unplugged)", "Gekkou", and "Memai" directed by Tsuyoshi Inoue.
- "Cage" directed by Tetsuji Nakamichi.
- "edge" directed by Yukihiko Tsutsumi.
- "We can go" and "Beautiful Fighter" directed by UGICHIN.
- "Gekkou (album version)" directed by Takuro Iwagami.
- "LITTLE BEAT RIFLE" directed by Takahiro Uchida.
- "ROLLIN'", "Ryuuseigun", "Ibara no Umi", "infection", and "King of Solitude" directed by Shuichi Banba.
- "Sign" directed by Tetsuo Inoue.
- "Watashi to WALTZ wo" directed by Yasunori Kakegawa, with creative director Jiro Yamazaki.
- "Ii Hi Tabidachi - Nishi e" directed by Junji Kojima, with creative director Jiro Yamazaki.
