= Saber Porto =

Portuguese video game developer

- Formerly: Bigmoon Entertainment (2008–2019)
- Type: Subsidiary
- Industry: Video games
- Founded: 2008; 13 years ago
- Founder: Paulo J. Gomes
- Headquarters: Porto, Portugal
- Area served: Worldwide
- Parent: Saber Interactive (2019–present)
- Website: saberporto.com

Saber Porto (formerly Bigmoon Entertainment) is a Portuguese video game developer based in Porto, with additional offices in Sheffield, UK. It was founded in 2008 by Paulo J. Gomes to create video games for PC and consoles, along with animated films and television series like TIC TAC TALES and PIKABOO.

Over the years, Bigmoon transitioned to work exclusively on video games, participating in game projects related to different genres. The company was recognized for being involved in racing games, such as the WRC series, MotoGP13, FlatOut4: Total Insanity, and Dakar 18.

In October 2019, it was announced that Bigmoon Entertainment was acquired by Saber Interactive and renamed Saber Porto. As Saber Porto, in October 2021, the studio participated in the remaster of the Crysis Remastered Trilogy, and in October 2022 launched its first original game as part of Saber Interactive, Dakar Desert Rally.

== History ==
=== 2008–2014 ===
The company started in 2008 as Bigmoon Animation Studios, and developed TV animation series for kids. Its first production was TIC TAC TALES, a TV animation series with 39 episodes, created by Paulo J. Gomes and broadcast by RTP, RTP África, RTP Internacional, and distributed in Europe by Panini Media in 2010, 2011, and 2012. In 2009, Bigmoon Animation Studios produced TV animation musicals for Canal Panda and distributed them on DVD by Info Capital with the title PIKABOO.

After the release of TIC TAC TALES, a second company was formed: Bigmoon Interactive Studios, which was developing the game version of TIC TAC TALES called D-TEAM: The Kidnapping of Professor Zig.

In 2012, Bigmoon Interactive Studios started working for Milestone (WRC 3 and WRC – THE GAME) and bitComposer, working in the game North & South. After the success of both partnerships, Milestone contracted Bigmoon to create motorcycles for MotoGP 13, bitComposer asked it to work on Jagged Alliance: Back in Action, and OG Games contacted the company to develop My Health Club for mobile devices. In January 2013, when Bigmoon was finishing Jagged Alliance: Back in Action for Linux and Macintosh, a contract was signed with Headup Games to develop a new PC action RPG game: Trapped Dead: Lockdown.

During Gamescom 2013, bitComposer also hired Bigmoon to fix the multiple issues from Games Distillery's Citadels, that was released in July 2013.

In December 2014, Bigmoon Interactive Studios received the information that its main publisher partner, bitComposer, entered insolvency, canceling ongoing projects. Both companies, Bigmoon Interactive and Bigmoon Animation were extinct, becoming developer and publisher Bigmoon Entertainment.

In the same year, Maximum Games contracted Bigmoon to develop the PS4 and Xbox One port from the PC game Lichdom: Battlemage using CryEngine 3. In June 2015, while Bigmoon was developing the console version for Lichdom, Maximum Games hired the company to complete and port Alekhine's Gun to PS4 and Xbox One.

=== 2016–present ===
In 2016, Bigmoon Entertainment released Alekhine's Gun and Lichdom: Battlemage, and started a new contract with Astragon Entertainment to develop Police Simulator 18, later renamed Police Simulator: Patrol Duty.

Bigmoon then started working with Camel 101 on the survival-horror game Syndrome and individually in the classic RPG Demons Age.

Bigmoon released its first self-publishing title Syndrome in September 2017.

By the end of 2016, Paulo Gomes wanted to bring a new game genre to the industry, and he created the Rally Raid racing subgenre, securing exclusive rights to develop and publish his own version of the Dakar Rally. In 2017, he entered into an agreement with Koch Media to proceed with Dakar 18. The game involved all the resources of the studio and was the biggest Portuguese investment in video game development, being released for PS4, Xbox One, and PC in September 2018.

In 2019, Bigmoon worked with Saber Interactive to port Call of Cthulhu for the Nintendo Switch. After the success of Call of Cthulhu's development, Saber Interactive and Bigmoon Entertainment entered into an acquisition agreement that was finalized in October 2019. Bigmoon's studio was then rebranded to Saber Interactive Porto (Saber Porto).

In October 2021, Saber Porto revealed that they worked together with other Saber studios and Crytek to participate in the remaster of the Crysis Remastered Trilogy. Saber Porto's first original IP, as part of Saber Interactive | Embracer Group, was announced on 10 December 2021 during the Saber Interactive showcase at The Game Awards, the game title was presented as Dakar Desert Rally.

Dakar Desert Rally, the next installment for the Dakar Rally video game franchise, received a date in the pre-order trailer, and a gameplay video during a showcase at Gamescom 2022. The game was released on the defined date, 4 October 2022.

== Bigmoon animated films and series ==
| Year | Title | Notes |
|---|---|---|
| 2009 | Pikaboo | DVD |
| 2010 | Tic Tac Tales | 39 episodes |
| 2011 | D-Team | Cancelled |

== Bigmoon games and collaborations ==
| Year | Title | Platform(s) | Publisher | Notes |
|---|---|---|---|---|
| 2012 | North & South: The Game | PC, Win8, IOS, Android | bitComposer Entertainment | Remaster |
| 2012 | WRC3: FIA World Rally Championship | PS3, Xbox 360 | Milestone | 3D art |
| 2013 | WRC Shakedown | PC, Xbox 360, PS3 | Milestone | 3D art |
| 2013 | MotoGP 13 | PS3, Xbox 360 | Milestone | 3D art |
| 2014 | Jagged Alliance: Back in Action | Mac, Linux | bitComposer Entertainment | Port |
| 2015 | Trapped Dead: Lockdown | PC | Headup games | Full game |
| 2015 | WRC 5 | PS4, Xbox One | Kylotonn, Bigben Interactive | 3D art |
| 2016 | Lichdom: Battlemage | PS4, Xbox One | Maximum Games | Port |
| 2016 | Alekhine's Gun | PS4, Xbox One | Maximum Games | Port |
| 2017 | Neighbors from Hell | PC, MacOS, Linux, Android, iOS | THQ Nordic | Remaster |
| 2017 | Neighbors from Hell 2: On Vacation | iOS, Android, macOS | THQ Nordic | Remaster |
| 2017 | FlatOut 4: Total Insanity | PS4, Xbox One | Kylotonn, Bigben Interactive, Strategy First | 3D Art |
| 2017 | Syndrome | PS4, Xbox One, PC | Bigmoon Entertainment | Full game |
| 2017 | Demons Age | PS4, Xbox One, PC | Bigmoon Entertainment | Full game |
| 2018 | Dakar 18 | PC, PS4, Xbox One | Bigmoon Entertainment, Koch Media | Full game |
| 2019 | Dakar 18: Ari Vatanen returns to Dakar | PC, PS4, Xbox One | Bigmoon Entertainment, Koch Media | Extra content |
| 2019 | Dakar 18: Desafío Ruta 40 Rally | PC, PS4, Xbox One | Bigmoon Entertainment, Koch Media | DLC |
| 2019 | Dakar Series: Desafío Inca Rally | PC, PS4, Xbox One | Bigmoon Entertainment, Koch Media | DLC |
| 2019 | Police Simulator: Patrol Duty | PC | Astragon Entertainment | Full game |
| 2019 | Call of Cthulhu | Nintendo Switch | Saber Interactive, Focus Home | Port |

== Saber Porto games and collaborations ==
| Year | Title | Platform(s) | Publisher | Notes |
|---|---|---|---|---|
| 2021 | Crysis Remastered Trilogy | PC, PS4, Xbox One | Crytek | Remaster |
| 2022 | Dakar Desert Rally | PC, PS4, PS5, Xbox One, Xbox Series | Saber Interactive | Full game |

== Cancelled games ==
| Year | Title | Platform(s) | Publisher | Notes |
|---|---|---|---|---|
| 2011 | D-TEAM: The Kidnapping of Professor Zig | PC, Wii, iOS, Android | Infocapital | Full game |
| 2012 | My Health Club | iOS, Android | OG Games | Full game |
| 2014 | Monday Night Combat 2 | PC, PS4, Xbox One | bitComposer, Uber Entertainment | Full game |
| 2014 | The Dark Eye: Demonicon | PS3 | Kalypso Media | Port |
| 2014 | Space Empires V | PC | Strategy First | Remaster |
