= Histeria =

Histeria may refer to:

- Histeria!, animated TV series
- Histeria (wrestler) (born 1969)
- "Histeria" (song), a 2015 song by Lali Espósito

== See also ==
- Hysteria (disambiguation)
