= Burger/Ink =

German techno duo

- Origin: Cologne, Germany
- Years active: 1995–present
- Labels: Matador
- Members: Jörg Burger; Mike Ink

Burger/Ink is a German techno duo, formed in Cologne in 1995 by Jörg Burger and Wolfgang Voigt (Mike Ink). The duo released an album, Las Vegas, for American Matador label in 1998. Pitchfork included the album on its list of "The 50 Best IDM Albums of All Time".
