= Gambys =

1997 video game

- Developer: Viagem Interactive
- Publisher: Portidata
- Composer: Jorge Mónica
- Platform: MS-DOS
- Release: POR: 1997
- Genre: Puzzle

Gambys is a 1997 ecological-themed Portuguese puzzle video game for MS-DOS developed by Viagem Interactive. Utilizing 3D pre-rendered graphics for its visuals and cutscenes, it was one of the first fully Portuguese-developed games for IBM PC compatibles. Featuring a story about creatures and man, the game was environmentally themed and featured several photos of animals and scenery in its gameplay.

== Plot and gameplay ==
The game centres about an imminent ecological catastrophe created by humans, where the only one capable of saving the planet were small creatures called Gambys. Thought to be a myth, these creatures are revealed to exist. These protectors possess a magical crystal which has memories of what the pure Earth used to be like including animals and plants, and the only way to save the planet is to release these images to the outside world.

To succeed, the player needs to clean and repair these images, which have degraded over time. The game includes various minigames of old ZX Spectrum games including a version of Space Invaders. The game bears similarities to Lemmings, with each type of Gambys having unique abilities and requiring different types of food replenishment. Enemies include Destroyer that reverses player progress, the Ghost that obscures the screen the image, and Gamby Girl who makes the Gambys inactive.

Luis Peres has written that while it "looks like a puzzle video game at first glance", it is "really an arcade game where the puzzle bit is just what makes things move in its gameplay".

== Development ==
=== Background ===
Throughout the 1980s, hundreds of Portuguese games were created for the ZX Spectrum, but by the following decade this platform had fallen out of favour. With the lack of a video gaming industry in the country, press like Spooler and Mega Score proved to be vital in the production and dissemination of games, and some of the first commercial products were Gambys and Portugal 1111. (The Elifoot series including sequels Elifoot II and Elifoot 98 were also very popular in Brazil in the 1990s.) In a local industry where interactive experience product were successful, it was difficult to convince investors to finance a purely entertainment video game, these proved to be the only two Portuguese commercial CD-ROM titles between 1995 and 2004.

Gambys' development team consisted of people well-verse in creating games for the ZX Spectrum, led by Portuguese developer Rui Tito and Paulo Carrasco, the latter of whom had authored titles like Megatron, Moon Defenders, Mr. Gulp and Alien Evolution. After receiving positive game reviews, they began to experiment with game programming for the PC. They were joined by Kraal creator Carlos Leote as programmer, Luís Peres as artist (whose drawings inspired the plot), Nelson Russa as game designer and Jorge Mônica as music and sound designer; they were collectively formed Viagem Interactive, which was the internal game development team of their larger company called Portidata. Production began in Portimão, with the team led by Rui Tito.

=== Production ===
As PCs were starting to emerge as a game machine, the Lemmings video game proved to be latest craze. 2D puzzle games were the apex of what the system could technically handle, so the team came upon the idea to try replicate that experience for the first Portuguese PC video game. The aim for the small independent software house was to make the most professional game possible using limited resources and a shoestring budget, graphically advanced beyond the limited of the ZX Spectrum. Development took place over two years, from 1993 to 1994.

Gambys proved to be a significant technical challenge, being one of the first SVGA games to show 65,000 colors on the screen when the standard was still 256; additionally, the game contained 12 original songs and 250 sound effects. One of the songs on the CD is an original piece composed and sung by team members Nuno Simão and Joran. Over the game's eight months of development over 1993, Luis Peres create 2D sprite drawings in Deluxe Paint, many frames of hand-drawn animation, and 3D Studio for modeling and rendering; over 1993/94 all the animations and screens took more than one year and a half to render, with some single frames taking over five hours. The main characters, called Gambys, are in-game called gambozinos, but the name was adapted for the game to be more accessible to the international market. Gambys was designed with 100 levels, with a sense of progression over increasingly difficult puzzles, and over eight hours of gameplay.

Carlos Leote has described Gambys as "an ecological game that appeals to human conscience so that men stop destroying their most precious asset, nature". Meanwhile, Nelson Russa said "Gambys, in a way, is associated to the world movement against the destruction of nature, calling attention to the fact that ambition can transform initially docile and harmless creatures into authentic monsters that do not look at the means to achieve their ends".

=== Release ===
While originally being previewed to the media in 1995, it was only in 1997 did Viagem Interactive and Portidata, after trying to negotiate with several publishers, decided to handle the launch themselves, with Maxis being responsible for the internationally released version. This title was released in Portugal and Spain by Portidata, and in England by Maxis. The Christmas season of 1996 saw the first time, a game "Made in Portugal" starting worldwide distribution, aided by Maxis. The team discussed a multiplatform launch, including a PlayStation 1 release. Viagem Interactive used this extra time to fix several bugs and the extra languages including Spanish, English, French and German.

Though Psygnosis and Virgin Games had initially showed some interest, with the advent of Windows 95 they quickly turned their attention to projects created specifically for the new operating system; as a result both publishers felt an investment in the publication of Gambys was no longer justified. Portidata was unable to port the game with such a small team, so the release was limited to Spain and Portugal.

=== Aftermath ===
After this project, the team disbanded and its members moved on; meanwhile Portidata transitioned to being a management software company. However, the game had a relative international success. Considered the first Portuguese video game, it was extensively publicized by the press. Gambys was the first serious and professional attempt by a Portuguese development team to create computer video games that could compare to the best PC puzzle games coming from the UK at the time such as those from Psygnosis and Virgin Games. Video Games Around the World asserts that the game was a "milestone" in the history of Portuguese game development as the first to use 3D graphics, the first to be sold in a box, and the first to be made by a professional team. Videojogos em Portugal: História, Tecnologia e Arte deemed it the " first international bet". Compatibility support of the game would unofficially end with the release of Windows ME, as the game was unable to run on subsequent platforms.

Over the years, a "secluded Gambys fan club" had begun to grow, including computer hobbyists who reconstructed 486-based machines just to play the game. Due to undocumented programming techniques, proper emulation of Gambys was a notoriously hard nut to crack for the DOS emulation scene with no way of getting the game to run. It was not until 2010 that playing Gambys on then-modern platforms was possible, when YouTube user Haruka Tavares created a tutorial showing the game running on a virtual machine; the link was posted to Luis Peres' website. Luis Peres gets around 5-6 emails about Gambys from around the world, including many fans from U.S. and Canada asking how they can run it in an emulator; this phenomenon inspired him and Tito to plan a "kind of remake".

== Reception ==
Reception

Review score
Publication	Score
Mega Score	85%

Jogos80 determined that the two-year wait period between showing the game to the press and the eventually release both beneficial and detrimental to the project, noting that despite the game improvements, it seemed outdated and non-commercially viable upon release in an era of rapidly advancing technology. Livro Verde Sociedade Informação 1997 said it had a "simple interface and careful presentation".

According to Video Games Around the World, the game was very well received in Spain and Portugal.
