= Neighbours from Hell =

2003 video game

- Windows PAL region cover art
- Developers: JoWooD Vienna; Bigmoon Entertainment (iOS, Android); Farbworks (Back from Hell compilation)
- Publishers: EU: JoWooD Productions; NA: Encore Software; WW: THQ Nordic (iOS, Android, macOS); WW: HandyGames (Back from Hell)
- Director: Michael Paeck
- Producers: Michael Paeck; Jurie Horneman
- Designers: Michael Paeck; Gerhard E. Kodys
- Programmers: Andreas Meissl; Bernhard Gruber
- Artist: Stefan M. Halegger
- Writer: Gerhard E. Kodys
- Composers: Wolfgang Tockner; Robbie Ost
- Engine: Unity (remastered)
- Platforms: Windows; GameCube; Xbox; Android; iOS; macOS; Nintendo Switch; PlayStation 4; Xbox One
- Release: Windows: PAL: June 20, 2003; NA: September 22, 2003; GameCube & Xbox: PAL: March 4, 2005; iOS, Android: WW: May 25, 2017; macOS: WW: June 22, 2017; Switch, PS4, Xbox One: WW: October 8, 2020
- Genres: Puzzle, strategy
- Mode: Single-player

Neighbours from Hell (Note: German: Böse Nachbarn, lit. 'Evil Neighbours'. Known in the United States as Neighbors from Hell) is a puzzle strategy game developed and published by JoWooD Productions. It was originally released for Windows in 2003, with later releases for GameCube, Xbox, Android and iOS.

A remastered compilation of the first two games titled Neighbours Back from Hell was released on Windows, Nintendo Switch, PlayStation 4, Xbox One, Android and iOS by HandyGames in October 2020. It features increased frame rate and HD visuals.

== Gameplay ==
Screenshots from the remastered version

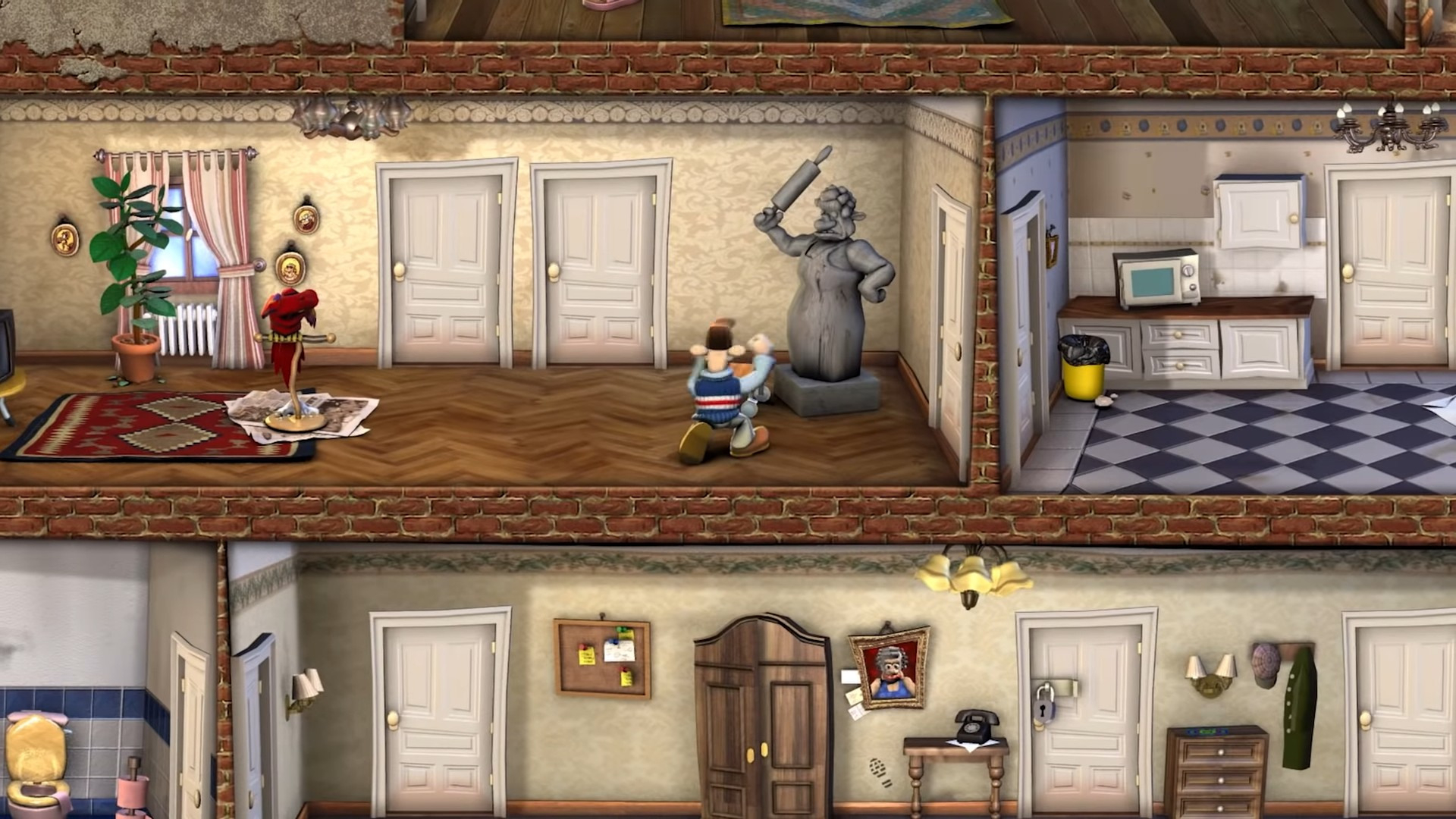
Woody sabotages a chair inside Rottweiler's house.

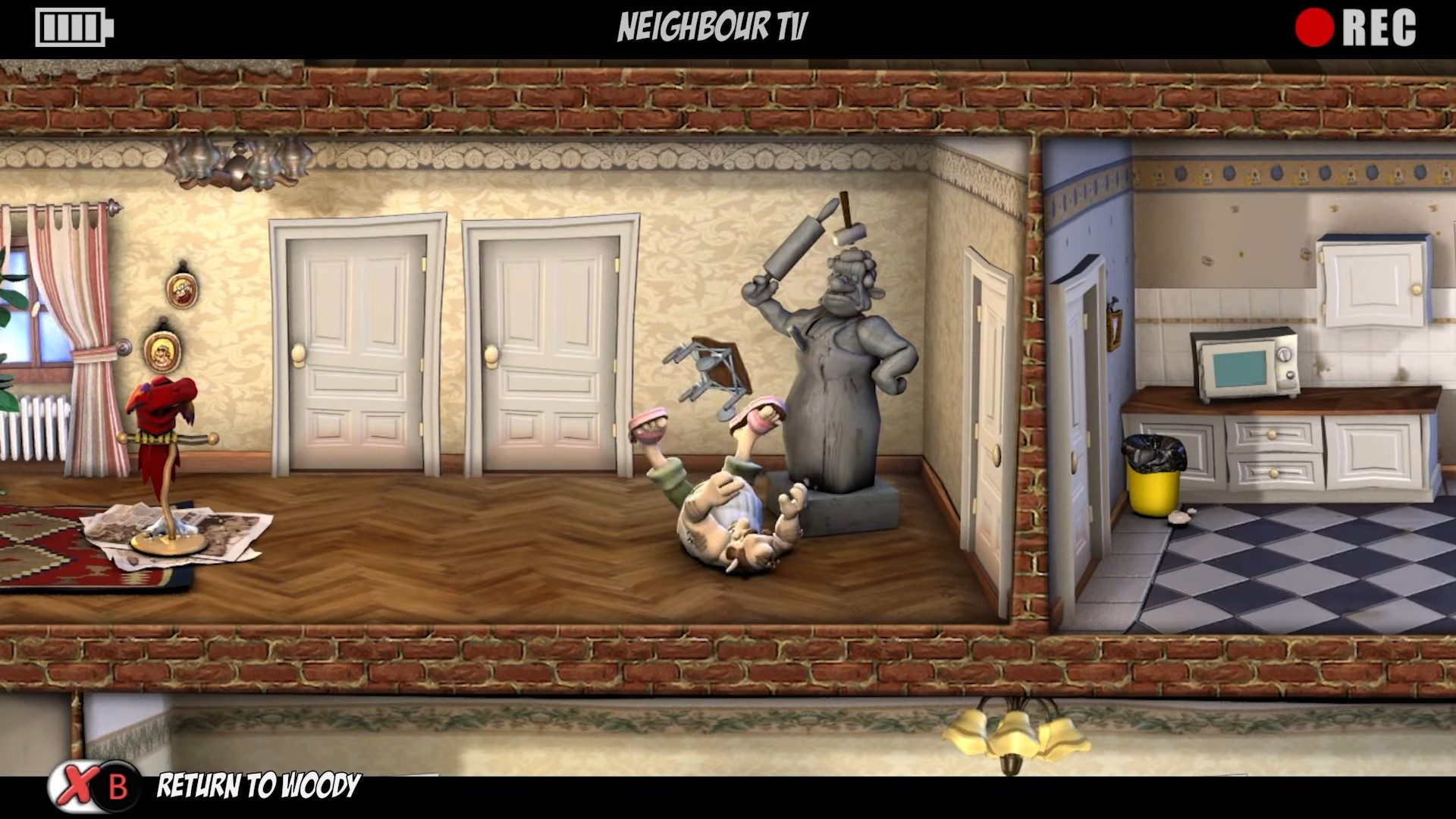
Rottweiler attempts to use the chair and falls down.

In Neighbours from Hell, the player takes control of Woody, an average man who seeks revenge on his neighbour Mr. Rottweiler by performing tricks on him, all of which is secretly caught on camera for a reality TV show of the same name. In each level, the aim is to complete a set amount of pranks on Rottweiler, whilst keep out of sight of him; if Rottweiler spots and catches Woody, the level ends in failure and the player must restart it. The game itself sees players moving between various rooms in the house, such as the kitchen and hallway, via their doors, with levels grouped into "seasons"; as the player progresses to new seasons, the player gains access to more rooms with more challenging prank puzzles to complete.

In order to prank Rottweiler, the player must interact with objects, some of which Woody will sabotage, while others require him to find items that are appropriate for the object (i.e. using a saw to sabotage a chair). While moving around the house, players must observe the routine that Rottweiler undertakes between various objects in the level and the path he uses, in order to plan how to avoid being seen and when to set up a prank. His routine can be disrupted in different ways; two of these involve his pets, a parrot and a guard dog, which will make noise if Woody fails to sneak around them and cause Rottweiler to check on them. To hide out of sight, players can make use of a wardrobe, and later slip under a bed to avoid being seen by Rottweiler.

Once a level's required number of pranks is completed, the player can continue to complete any additional pranks available, and eventually they must finish the level by bringing Woody to the neighbour's front door, whereupon they are scored on their performance.

== Plot ==
Woody is an average man who has a happy life, until his neighbor Mr. Rottweiler makes his life miserable. Woody decides to take full revenge on Mr. Rottweiler and calls up a TV crew, which produces the self-titled reality show that shows the neighbor's relations from worst sight.

== Reception ==
Reception

Aggregate score
Aggregator	Score		
Aggregator	GameCube	PC	Xbox
Metacritic	41/100	69/100	49/100

Review scores
Publication	Score		
Publication	GameCube	PC	Xbox
Computer Games Magazine	N/A	3/5	N/A
Computer Gaming World	N/A	3.5/5	N/A
Eurogamer	N/A	6/10	N/A
GameSpot	N/A	6.7/10	N/A
GameSpy	N/A	3/5	N/A
GameZone	N/A	7/10	N/A
IGN	N/A	7/10	N/A
Jeuxvideo.com	11/20	13/20	11/20
PC Gamer (US)	N/A	70%	N/A
X-Play	N/A	2/5	N/A
Cube	8.2/10	N/A	N/A
The Cincinnati Enquirer	N/A	4/5	N/A

The PC version received "average" reviews, while the GameCube and Xbox versions received "generally unfavorable reviews", according to the review aggregation website Metacritic.

== Legacy ==
=== Ports and re-releases ===
On 4 March 2005, JoWooD released the game for the GameCube and Xbox exclusively in European territories. These versions of the game are not straight ports of the original and feature a selection of levels from the original game and its sequel.

The original Microsoft Windows version was digitally re-released on GOG.com with its sequel by JoWood on June 9, 2009. It was released on Steam by Nordic Games on November 7, 2013 after successfully getting Greenlit by the community.

A mobile port of the game was released worldwide by THQ Nordic for iOS and Android on May 25, 2017 on the App Store and Google Play, respectively. A port for macOS was released on the App Store on June 22 of the same year.

==== Neighbours Back from Hell ====
A remaster, named Neighbours back From Hell, was released on October 8, 2020 for consoles and PC by Vienna-based developer FarbWorks and HandyGames (a publishing division owned by THQ Nordic), and contains both the first game and the sequel, remastered and reworked in HD and at high framerates. It received mixed-to-positive reviews from critics and fans.

=== Sequel ===
In 2004 a sequel was released, called Neighbours from Hell 2: On Vacation. In this game, instead of being in a house, the player travels to various locations around the world. This time the player must have their caution turned to the mom of the Neighbour as well, if they do not want to be caught.
