= Alentejo: The Tinto and The Ugly =

2025 video game

- Developer: Loading Studio
- Publisher: Teknamic Software
- Director: Ivan Barroso
- Designers: Ivan Barroso; Vasco Oliveira
- Programmer: Daniel Penão
- Artists: Marta Vaz, Raquel Neves, Rui Barata
- Writers: Vasco Oliveira, João Canelo
- Composer: Rui Rodrigues
- Engine: GB Studio
- Platforms: Game Boy, Web browser, PC
- Release: Web browser: EU: October 25, 2025; Game Boy: EU: February 25, 2026
- Genre: Action role-playing game
- Mode: Single-player

Alentejo: The Tinto & The Ugly is an RPG game released in 2025 and developed by Loading Studios and published by Teknamic Software for Game Boy, PC and Web browser. The game is the sequel to Alentejo: Tinto's Law, inspired in Spaghetti Western movies of the 1960s.

The narrative follows Gildo and Dolores after the events of the previous game. The Game Boy version marks the first commercially released sequel developed in Portugal to be launched for that platform.

== Gameplay ==
Alentejo: The Tinto & The Ugly is a Single-player video game and Action role-playing game with an emphasis on narrative, as well as puzzle-solving and combat elements.

Like its predecessor, the game is divided into two sections: an overworld focused on narrative progression, exploration challenges, and action sequences, and an underground world featuring levels centred on Puzzle and collectable Power-up items. The narrative is more prominent in the overworld areas, while puzzle elements are emphasised in the underground sections. New combat modes have been introduced, including duels, shooting sequences, and horseback riding segments across the region.

The narrative of Alentejo: The Tinto & The Ugly continues the journey of Gildo and Dolores in their effort to defeat Barão Tinto and dismantle his network of control and illicit wine trafficking in the region. At this stage, Gildo is supported by Dolores as they explore the border area between Portugal and Spain. In Spanish territory, the duo establishes contacts with local allies and resistance groups in order to destabilise the operations of the bandit El Feo. This strategic alliance seeks to assemble a Portuguese–Spanish team capable of confronting and ultimately dismantling Barão Tinto's organisation on Portuguese soil.

== Development and release ==
Alentejo: The Tinto & The Ugly was developed by the team at Loading Studios, formerly known by developing The Fisherman: A Codefish Tale, and Alentejo: Tinto's Law. The team behind Alentejo: The Tinto & The Ugly included Ivan Barroso (director and game designer), Vasco Oliveira (level designer), Daniel Penão (programmer), Marta Vaz (artist), Rui Barata (animation), Raquel Neves (concept artist), and João Canelo (narrative designer). The music was composed by Rui Rodrigues, and the promotional artwork was created by Tiago Pimentel. According to Vasco Oliveira, the game aimed to continue the narrative established in the first title, expanding the gameplay options and improving upon the less successful aspects of the previous game.

The game was released digitally in October 2025 for Web browser and as PC game. A cartridge version for the Game Boy was released in February 2026 by Teknamic Software.

=== Other Campaigns ===
In the wake of the disaster caused by Storm Kristin in February 2026, which struck the regions of Leiria and Marinha Grande in Portugal, Loading Studios announced that all profits from the sales of Alentejo: The Tinto & The Ugly and Alentejo: Tinto's Law during that month would be donated to support the affected communities.

The soundtrack of Alentejo: The Tinto & The Ugly, composed by Rui Rodrigues, was selected for the "Insert Coin to Continue" programme, presented as part of the 2026 Press Start festival at Casa da Música in Porto. On 4 October 2026, the soundtrack was performed live by the Digitópia collective in a concert dedicated to music from Portuguese video games.

== Reception ==
=== Reviews ===
Alentejo: The Tinto & The Ugly received generally positive reviews, particularly for its narrative, puzzles, humor, action sequences, musical variety, and historical references to the 19th-century Iberian Peninsula. Several analyses also highlighted improvements in the game's visuals, including more detailed characters, environments, and animations, as well as greater diversity in gameplay. Some reviews noted performance issues, although these were considered typical and expected given the period and the hardware.

=== Awards ===
At the 2025 Lisboa Games Week event, the game was awarded the “Developers Choice” prize. In 2026, at the 8th edition of the Geeks d'Ouro awards, the game won the “Best National Game” award.

== Future and Sequels ==
The sequel to Alentejo: The Tinto & The Ugly has not yet been officially announced, although the creators have mentioned in interviews that it is planned. However, the studio has revealed that its next project will be a new adventure, #31 Luzyahdas: The Botafogo Odyssey, a science fiction video game set in the 31st century centered on the space frigate Botafogo.
