= The Ultimate Collection (Chihiro Onitsuka album) =

Compilation album by Chihiro Onitsuka
- Released: December 1, 2004
- Recorded: 2000–2003
- Genre: Alternative rock, baroque pop, country rock
- Length: 77:20
- Language: Japanese
- Label: Toshiba-EMI

Chihiro Onitsuka chronology
Sugar High (2002)	The Ultimate Collection (2004)	Singles 2000-2003 (2005)

The Ultimate Collection (stylized as the ultimate collection) is the first compilation album by Japanese singer-songwriter Chihiro Onitsuka, released in 2004. It came out months after the artist terminated the contracts with record label and management office.

== Production ==
All the 15 tracks on the album was digitally remastered by Ted Jensen. Selection of the songs was supervised by Takefumi Haketa, Onitsuka's previous musical collaborator who produced all her materials released under EMI. The performer has not authorized this retrospective album, however, omitting the release from the discography page on her present official website which launched in 2007.

== Reception ==
The Ultimate Collection debuted at the number-three on the Japanese Oricon chart and remained there for 23 weeks. The album was certified Platinum by the Recording Industry Association of Japan upon its release, for shipments of over 250,000 copies.

== Cover art ==
The front cover of the compilation was picked out from the photo session which was taken for her cancelled fourth studio album supposed to have been released in March 2004. Along with the album, a DVD collection composed of 17 music videos entitled The Complete Clips was issued simultaneously.

== Track listing ==
CD
No.	Title	Writer(s)	Arranger(s)	Length
1.	"Ryūseigun (流星群)"	Chihiro Onitsuka, Takefumi Haketa	Haketa	5:14
2.	"Koe (声)"	Onitsuka, Haketa	Haketa	4:45
3.	"Memai (眩暈)"	Onitsuka, Haketa	Haketa	5:08
4.	"Gekkō (月光)"	Onitsuka	Haketa	5:09
5.	"infection"	Onitsuka, Haketa	Haketa	5:45
6.	"We can go"	Onitsuka	Haketa	4:40
7.	"Fly to me"	Onitsuka	Haketa	4:56
8.	"Shine (シャイン)" (album version)	Onitsuka	Nozomu Tsuchiya, Haketa	4:57
9.	"Back Door" (album version)	Onitsuka	Tsuchiya, Haketa	5:08
10.	"King of Solitude"	Onitsuka, Haketa	Haketa	4:59
11.	"Crow"	Onitsuka, Haketa	Haketa	5:17
12.	"Ibara no Umi (茨の海)"	Onitsuka	Haketa	5:06
13.	"Watashi to Waltz o (私とワルツを)"	Onitsuka	Haketa	5:20
14.	"call"	Onitsuka, Haketa	Haketa	5:19
15.	"Sign"	Onitsuka	Haketa	5:30
Total length:				77:20

DVD: the complete clips
No.	Title	Writer(s)	Director(s)	Length
1.	"Shine" (Unplugged)	Onitsuka	Tsuyoshi Inoue
2.	"Gekkō (月光)"	Onitsuka	Tsuyoshi Inoue
3.	"Cage"	Onitsuka	Tetsuji Nakamichi
4.	"Memai (眩暈)"	Onitsuka, Haketa	Tsuyoshi Inoue
5.	"Edge"	Onitsuka	Yukihiko Tsutsumi
6.	"We Can Go"	Onitsuka	Ugichin
7.	"Gekkō (月光)" (Album ver.)	Onitsuka	Takurō Iwagami
8.	"Little Beat Rifle" (Single ver.)	Onitsuka	Takahiro Uchida
9.	"Rollin'"	Onitsuka	Shūichi Banba
10.	"Ryūseigun (流星群)"	Onitsuka, Haketa	Banba
11.	"Ibara no Umi (茨の海)"	Onitsuka	Banba
12.	"Infection"	Onitsuka, Haketa	Banba
13.	"King of Solitude"	Onitsuka, Haketa	Banba
14.	"Sign"	Onitsuka	Tetsuo Inoue
15.	"Beautiful Fighter"	Onitsuka	Ugichin
16.	"Watashi to Waltz o (私とワルツを)"	Onitsuka	Yasunori Kakegawa
17.	"Ii Hi Tabidachi Nishi e (いい日旅立ち･西へ)"	Shinji Tanimura	Junji Kojima

== Certifications ==
Region	Certification	Certified units/sales
Japan (RIAJ)	Platinum	232,000

== Charts ==
=== Weekly charts ===
Album

Chart (2004)	Position
Japanese Oricon Albums Chart	3

DVD

Chart (2004)	Position
Japanese Oricon DVDs Chart	9

=== Year-end charts ===
Album

Chart (2005)	Position
Japanese Albums Chart	65

== Release history ==
Album

Country	Date	Label	Format	Catalog number
Japan	December 1, 2004	Toshiba-EMI/Virgin Tokyo	CD	TOCT-25560
Japan	December 12, 2012	Universal/EMI Music Japan	SHM-CD	TOCT-95155
