= Dakar 18 =

2018 video game

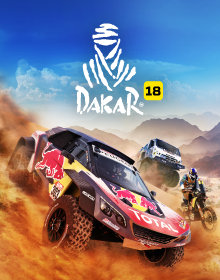
- Developer: Bigmoon Entertainment
- Publisher: Deep Silver
- Director: Paulo Gomes
- Producers: Paulo Gomes; Adélio Rangel
- Designers: Paulo Gomes; Adélio Rangel; Pedro Bianchi Prata; Marco Mandim
- Programmers: Nelson Duarte; Paulo Lage; Roman Marusyk
- Artists: Ricardo Blanco; Jorge Manassés; Jorge Aguiar; Jorge Manassés; Sergii Kurbatov
- Writer: Daniel Lucas
- Series: Dakar Rally
- Engine: Unreal Engine 4
- Platforms: Microsoft Windows; PlayStation 4 Xbox One
- Release: 25 September 2018
- Genre: Racing
- Modes: Single-player, multiplayer

Dakar 18 is a racing video game developed by Portuguese studio Bigmoon Entertainment and published by Deep Silver for PlayStation 4, Xbox One and Microsoft Windows. It is based on the annual rally raid organized by the Amaury Sport Organisation (A.S.O). It was the first officially licensed Dakar Rally game since Dakar 2: The World's Ultimate Rally in 2003.

The Dakar Rally is an endurance race that's considered one of the most demanding events on the motorsports calendar. The 2018 running has a route of 9000 km, and it is the 10th Dakar Rally to be held in South America since the series' relocation from Europe and Africa in 2009.

== Gameplay ==
Dakar 18 is set in an open world environment. It features both offline and online single-player and multiplayer modes. The game world is over 18,000 km^{2} in size and is completely explorable, surpassing the Guinness World Records for the biggest open world in racing videogames established by Fuel (approximately 14,400 km^{2} in size). Dakar 18 simulates 14 stages spread across Bolivia, Argentina and Peru that give the player freedom to explore environments built from satellite images of the region.

Dakar 18 has players use the official Road Books of Dakar Rally 2018 to navigate it's open world. Players must follow the instructions given to them by their navigator and learn how to interpret the Road Book itself to finish a race.

There are three difficulty modes:

In Rookie mode (easy difficulty level), players have a compass when off-road, vehicles are more resistant, repairs cost fewer DP (Dakar Points) and opponents are less challenging. In Competitor mode (standard difficulty level), there is no compass available, vehicles are more fragile, repairs are more expensive (Dakar Points and additional time) and opponents are more challenging. Both modes feature autosaves at waypoints. While the third difficulty mode, Legend, can only be unlocked when players complete Competitor mode.

New players can select “Explore” to learn the basics, or just collect artefacts in treasure hunting. Multiplayer supports up to seven players in online stages, played in split-screen mode or two screen co-op. Five categories of vehicles are available, each with different physics, including cars, trucks, motorcycles, quads and UTVs.

Players can play as official rally drivers like Sam Sunderland, Carlos Sainz, Stéphane Peterhansel, Sebastian Loeb and many others, and can exit their vehicle and take control of the pilots to explore, rescue and repair. If the vehicle is trapped, players can use shovels to dig through sand or mud, place recovery boards, and tow the vehicle. During races, players also have to pay attention to the damage and repair system.

Dakar 18 features realistic simulation for weather and different terrain, including sand and water. Players can clean their vehicles of dirt and mud by driving through rain or along shallow riverbeds. Along the way, players can stop their tracks to help others and receive extra repair points in return.

== Reception ==
Reception

Aggregate score
Aggregator	Score
Metacritic	59/100

Review scores
Publication	Score
Jeuxvideo.com	11/20
4Players	45%
GameStar	71%
Trusted Reviews	3/5
IGN Portugal	6.5/10
IGN Spain	6/10
Sector	7/10
Gameblog	5/10

Dakar 18 received "mixed or average" reviews from critics, according to the review aggregation website Metacritic. Websites either praised or criticized the navigation, pointing out that while learning to use the Road Book was rewarding for some, casual players may find it difficult. The physics of the vehicles were also received as poor, while the map was generally praised for its level of detail and vast size. After 11 updates, user reviews for the game improved. Some media outlets praised Dakar 18's uniqueness, realism and ambition.

Jeuxvideo.com said that "Its numerous technical flaws and its poor physics are too much to overcome." GameStar also said that "For an Arcade racer with offroad attitude it is too complex, for a race simulation the physics are too exaggerated, the control too spongy and the navigation too imprecise."

Trusted Reviews wrote that Dakar 18 "delivers something truly distinct in the wider racing genre, and though the core gameplay isn’t immediately accessible, it can be greatly rewarding to those that take a chance on tackling it properly." IGN Spain said that "Dakar 18 manages to capture the essence of the event sublimely, reaching an almost sickening level of realism, but fails in everything else."

IGN Portugal mentioned that "Dakar 18 is an ambitious project from Bigmoon, which offers a very realistic experience of what it will be like to tackle a Rally Raid of this size and difficulty, having the potential to grab especially those who have followed the race since the days when it started from Paris to Senegal. Its strongest point will be the Road Book navigation system, incredibly detailed and very interesting to follow and learn, but the game completely fails to offer an enjoyable driving experience, especially due to the lack of care and attention to the physics of the vehicles available."

Slovak website, Sector, said that "Dakar 18 is a bigger portion of fun than today's scheduled races. It's a challenge in the sense of whether you can survive at all, make it to the finish. (...) At first unnoticeable, then contagiously compelling as you struggle to grapple with the problem, master it and overcome it. That's what Dakar is all about. Too bad the gameplay one still needs a few patches. Dakar 18 isn't everyone's car, but it would be a shame to overlook it just because it's different. (...) something like Dakar 18 has been missing here for a long time."
