= Hysteria (video game) =

- Developer: Special FX Software
- Publisher: Software Projects
- Platform: ZX Spectrum
- Release: 1987
- Genre: Action
- Mode: Single-player

Hysteria is an action video game developed by Special FX Software and published by Software Projects for the ZX Spectrum in 1987. It follows a time-traveling agent through three historical periods.

== Gameplay and reception ==
It is a side-scrolling action game in which the player controls the last surviving member of the Time Corps. The objective is to travel through different periods of history and eliminate the enemies responsible for disrupting the timeline. The adventure takes place across three different eras: Ancient Greece, the Dark Ages and the distant future. The hero is equipped with an Energy Conversion Kit, which can transform certain enemy projectiles into weapons and useful equipment. Throughout the game, different weapons and special powers can be acquired, while pieces of a jigsaw puzzle are collected. Once enough pieces have been assembled, the final enemy is revealed and must be defeated before progressing to the next era.

Crash magazine awarded Hysteria an overall score of 78%, noting that it was derivative but engaging. Your Sinclair gave it a 9 out of 10 as a well-crafted and addictive example of a familiar theme.

== Development ==
The ZX Spectrum version was developed by Jonathan M. Smith, Karen Davies, Tony Pomfret and Stephen Wahid.
