= Gekkō (song) =

2000 single by Chihiro Onitsuka

Single by Chihiro Onitsuka

from the album Insomnia
- Released: August 9, 2000
- Recorded: 2000
- Genre: J-pop; Rock
- Length: 5:09
- Label: EMI Music Japan; Virgin Tokyo
- Songwriters: Chihiro Onitsuka; Takefumi Haketa
- Producer: Takefumi Haketa

Chihiro Onitsuka singles chronology
"Shine" (2000)	"Gekkō" (2000)	"Cage" (2000)

Music video
- "Gekkō" on YouTube

"Gekkō" (月光, Moonlight) is a song by Japanese singer-songwriter Chihiro Onitsuka from her debut album Insomnia (2000). It was released on August 9, 2000, as the album's second single. The song is mostly known for serving as a theme song to the Japanese television drama series Trick. The single peaked at number eleven on the Oricon Weekly Singles chart and remains as Onitsuka's best-selling single.

== Commercial performance ==
"Gekkō" debuted at number thirty on the Oricon Weekly Singles chart and peaked at number eleven, due to the unexpected hit of the television drama series Trick. The single spent thirty-seven weeks within top 100 on the chart and have sold than 561,000 physical copies and 500,000 digital copies in Japan alone.

In January 2014, the song charted at number fifty-eight on the Billboard Japan Hot 100 chart, as the song was used in television commercial for the Japanese film Trick The Movie: Last Stage, the last installment of the Trick series.

== Music video ==
The music video was released on June 24, 2011, via Onitsuka's Vevo account. It was directed by Tsuyoshi Inoue and primarily features Onitsuka singing in front of a Christian cross. As of August 2018, it has received over 40 million views.

== In popular culture ==
"Gekkō" served as the theme song to the Japanese comedy crime drama television series Trick and later used in the two films based on the series, Trick: the Movie (2002) and Trick The Movie: Last Stage (2014). Also, the song was used as the Japanese theme song to the American science-fiction romance television series Journeyman and used in some Japanese Variety shows. The song was later covered by the Japanese singer-songwriter Hideaki Tokunaga, on his fourth cover album Vocalist 4, which has sold over 250,000 copies.

"Arrow of Pain" served as the theme song to the Japanese road movie Glowing Glowing (2002).

== Track listing ==
No.	Title	Writer(s)	Arranger(s)	Length
1.	"Gekkō"	Chihiro Onitsuka	Takefumi Haketa	5:09
2.	"Arrow of Pain"	Onitsuka	Haketa	5:15
3.	"Gekkō" (Instrumental)	Onitsuka	Haketa	5:09
Total length:				15:33

== Charts ==
=== Weekly charts ===
Chart (2000–2014)	Peak position
Japanese Single Sales (Oricon)	11
Japanese Singles (Japan Hot 100)	58

=== Year-end charts ===
Chart (2000)	Position
Japanese Single Sales (Oricon)	71

== Certifications and sales ==
Region	Certification	Certified units/sales
Japan (RIAJ)	Platinum	561,000 (physical sales)
Japan (RIAJ)	2× Platinum	500,000+ (digital sale)
Japan (RIAJ)	Gold	50,000,000+ (streaming)

== Release history ==
Region	Date	Format	Label	Ref.
Japan	August 9, 2000	CD single	EMI Music Japan; Virgin Tokyo	
Japan	December 3, 2003	digital download	EMI Music Japan; Virgin Tokyo	
