= Dakar 2: The World's Ultimate Rally =

2003 video game

- Developer: Acclaim Studios Cheltenham
- Publisher: Acclaim Entertainment
- Platforms: PlayStation 2, GameCube, Xbox
- Release: PlayStation 2: EU: 14 March 2003; GameCube: EU: 28 March 2003; NA: 31 March 2003; Xbox: EU: 6 June 2003; NA: 19 June 2003
- Genre: Racing
- Modes: Single-player, multiplayer

Dakar 2: The World's Ultimate Rally is a racing video game developed by Acclaim Studios Cheltenham and published by Acclaim Entertainment for PlayStation 2, GameCube and Xbox. It is based on the real-life Paris Dakar Rally - one of the world's most difficult and dangerous sporting events. Based on the 2002 running of the event, the game begins in rural Paris and ends on a beach in Dakar, Senegal, with 11 stages in between, including tracks in the Sahara Desert and Atlas Mountains.

== Gameplay ==
The selection of the vehicles is made of three main classes: bikes (will oversteer when in sharp turns), cars (pickup trucks), and trucks (big rigs powered by diesel). As an attempt to recreate the Dakar event, the game offers overall twelve tracks, which range from villages to deserts. Each course has certain features, so the players have to customize their vehicle to match the conditions. During the race, there is a progress meter on the screen with five parts, each slowly changing to blue as the players are pacing between checkpoints, and subsequently turning to red or green depending on how the passed time matches up to the minimum needed.
