= Hysteria (periodical) =

Hysteria is a feminist publication, a non-profit periodical and platform for feminist activism.

== History ==
Launched in the summer of 2013 by a group of students from the School of Oriental and African Studies at the University of London, HYSTERIA aims to be a platform for radical creative discourse about feminism encompassing poetry, text, and visual arts.

Hysteria is sold as a quarterly publication. Examples of themes from early publications were 'BackLash', 'Roles and Rules', 'Antagonism', and 'Abjection'.

Hysteria can be purchased in London at Housmans, ICA, and Foyles bookshops, as well as internationally where it is available in thirteen countries with launches in Berlin, Paris, and New York (2014 and 2015). Each issue has been crowd funded to cover basic printing costs.
