= Fragger =

- Developers: Harold Brenes, Miniclip.com
- Platforms: Flash; iOS; Android; Windows Phone; Symbian
- Release: June 3, 2010
- Genres: Action; Puzzle

Fragger is a popular trajectory-based puzzle game created and developed by Harold Brenes and released in 2009 for the Internet. After achieving popularity on the Internet, being played more than 100 million times, it was licensed and ported by Miniclip to iPhone in 2010, and to Android and PlayJam in 2012. By August 2014 it had become the second-placed paid app for iPhone and third overall top-grossing app in Apple's App Store. The gameplay is similar to Angry Birds. The game has had "generally favourable reviews", garnering a Metacritic score of 86% based on 5 critic reviews.

== Development ==
Originally created by Harold Brenes as an Adobe Flash game published by ArmorGames.com, the game was later adapted for iOS devices by Miniclip. It was released to iPhone on June 3, 2010. After achieving popularity on the Internet, being played more than 100 million times, it was ported to iPhone in 2011 and to Android and PlayJam in 2012.

== Gameplay ==
The aim of each of the 100+ levels is to use the protagonist to throw grenades at and into buildings in order to bypass defenses and blow up enemies. The gameplay is similar to Angry Birds.

== Critical reception ==
The game has had "generally favourable reviews", garnering a Metacritic score of 86% based on 5 critic reviews.

CommonSensemedia gave the game a rating of 5/5 stars, and compared the game to Angry Birds and Bloons. The site commented "... this one is based around realistic-looking explosives (as opposed to exploding cartoon birds or balloon-popping darts) and your targets are human. The animation is cartoony—some might even say 'cute'—and there's no blood. However, if you've played the online version of Fragger, which featured dummies to blow up, you may be surprised to find human targets in this mobile version." Macworld said "Due to its simple interface, level diversity, and its strategic element, Fragger is highly addictive and simply one of the best puzzle games for the iPhone." AppSpy wrote "What started out as a competent Flash game has quickly come into its own on the App Store and now boasts 130 levels with more on the way; HD content; and a physics puzzle style that's satisfying to solve." SlideToPlay said "Fragger is a deviously fun game that's quick and easy to pick up and play." 148Apps wrote, "Fragger is a solid, well-developed, addictive pick-up-and-play title that should appeal to both casual and hardcore gamers alike." GamePro wrote, "It's hard not to draw the comparison between Fragger and Angry Birds, but the similarities are obvious. Fragger has arguably better level design than Angry Birds, but Angry Birds has a bit more variety because of its different types of birds, so the two coexist well and are certainly not clones."

PocketGamerUK said " A neat action puzzler, Fragger is another example of a popular Flash game making a welcome leap to iPhone." Apple'N'Apps favourably compared the game to Monster Island and Hambo. Modojo wrote "Ultimately, the overwhelming frustration makes Fragger HD a huge pain in the butt. For each moment of brilliance (of which, there are many), we can name a ton of bothersome issues that make the game tougher than it should be. Sure, there's a lot of content for $2.99 and the App's enjoyable, but you're much better off purchasing Angry Birds or Trucks & Skulls." AppSafari said "So if you enjoy blowing up cartoony terrorists with frag grenades while playing some gradually more complicated puzzles, then you’ll love this game. The game is entertaining but not for small children." Mobot said " Fragger is an oddly enjoyable “physics-based” exploder, with plenty of bang for your 0p." AppStorm wrote "Puzzling levels that challenge the player are what make a game truly great and Fragger HD succeeds in delivering many a challenge. Miniclip’s classic is still great on the iPad, despite the aforementioned issues." ArcadeSushi listed the game in an article titled If You Like Angry Birds, Try These 10 iOS Games, writing "Hopefully you're good with angles because Fragger is a tricky one."

== Sales ==
By August 2014 Fragger had become the second placed paid app for iPhone and third overall top grossing app in Apple's App Store.
