= This Armor =

Studio album by Chihiro Onitsuka
- Released: March 6, 2002
- Recorded: 2001–2002
- Studio: Melody Star; Landmark; Artworks Mouri Studios
- Genre: Alternative rock
- Length: 51:00
- Language: Japanese, English
- Label: Toshiba EMI/Virgin Tokyo, Universal J
- Producer: Takefumi Haketa; Nozomu Tsuchiya

Chihiro Onitsuka chronology
Insomnia (2001)	This Armor (2002)	Sugar High (2002)

Singles from This Armor
- 1. "infection" Released: September 7, 2001; 2. "Ryūseigun" Released: February 6, 2002

This Armor is the second studio album recorded by Japanese singer-songwriter Chihiro Onitsuka, released in March 2002. It features two lead singles "infection", "Ryūseigun", and remake versions of "Arrow of Pain" (B-Side of a single "Gekko" in 2000) and "Little Beat Rifle" (double A-Side to "infection").

Onitsuka described the album as "a sequel to Insomnia", her chart-topping debut which came out in 2001. Like its predecessor, the title of the album was named by the artist, simply because she liked the sound of the phrase. Cover art was taken by photographer Mika Ninagawa in Miyako-jima, Okinawa prefecture.

This Armor debuted and peaked at the number-three on the Japanese Oricon albums chart and remained the top-300 for 25 weeks, with estimated sales of over half a million copies. The album was certified Platinum by the Recording Industry Association of Japan upon its release, for shipments of over 400,000 units.

== Track listing ==
All songs arranged and produced by Takefumi Haketa.

No.	Title	Writer(s)	Length
1.	"Rollin'"	Chihiro Onitsuka, Takefumi Haketa	5:06
2.	"Ibara no Umi (茨の海, Sea of Thorns)"	Onitsuka	5:05
3.	"Shadow (シャドウ)"	Onitsuka	5:41
4.	"everything, in my hands"	Onitsuka	4:45
5.	"Our Song"	Onitsuka, mayu	3:49
6.	"Ryūseigun (流星群, Meteor)"	Onitsuka, Haketa	5:12
7.	"Little Beat Rifle" (album ver.)	Onitsuka	4:53
8.	"Arrow of Pain"	Onitsuka	5:15
9.	"infection"	Onitsuka, Haketa	5:45
10.	"Crow"	Onitsuka, Haketa	5:15
Total length:			51:00

== Personnel ==
Credits adapted from liner notes of the album

Session musicians

- Chihiro Onitsuka – vocals, composer, lyricist
- Takefumi Haketa – acoustic piano, keyboards, drum programming, pad, tubular bells, background vocals; sound producer, composer (not credited on the sleeve notes)
- Hiroshi Sato – wurlitzer, Hammond B-3
- Takashi Nishiumi – acoustic guitar, electric guitar, dobro guitar, background vocals
- Nobuyasu Horikoshi – acoustic guitar, electric guitar
- Kiyotsugu Amano – gut guitar
- Hitoshi Watanabe – bass guitar, contra bass
- Tatsuo Hayashi – drums
- Hideo Yamaki – drums
- Yuichi Togashiki – drums
- Ikuo Kakehashi – percussion, udu, talking drum, bell, tambourine, triangle, djembe
- Marie Ohishi – timpani, suspended cymbals
- Naoto – violin
- Osamu Iyoku – violin
- Takuya Mori – violin
- Kouta Nagahara – violin
- Machiya Saito – violin
- Ado Matsumoto – violin
- Etsuko Hara – violin
- Ikuko Nakaya – violin
- Jun Tajiri – violin
- Koji Ohtake – violin
- Hitoshi Konno – violin
- Shizuka Kawaguchi – violin
- Marisa Kosugi – violin
- Hiroki Mutoh – violin
- Yu Sugino – violin
- Mariko Aikawa – violin
- Yu Manabe – violin
- Shoko Miki – viola
- Kaori Banba – viola
- Gentaro Sakaguchi – viola
- Masami Horisawa – cello
- Toshihiko Tsuchida – cello
- Hajime Mizoguchi – cello
- Akio Ueki – cello
- Hiroki Kashiwagi – cello
- Tomoyuki Asakawa – harp
- Mari Yasui – tin whistle
- Toshiko Ezaki – background vocals
- Melody Little Bears – background vocals

Production

- Nozomu Tsuchiya – producer
- Toshihiro Hachisuka musicians coordinate
- Yuya Suzuki – engineer
- Shinichi Naitoh – engineer
- Kanako Fukuda – engineer
- Satoshi Konno – engineer
- Atsuhiro Murakami – drum technician on track 2
- Jiro Yamazaki – visual producer
- Naomi Terakawa – visual coordinator
- Miyuki Hentona – art director
- Mika Ninagawa – photographer
- Daisuke Iga – stylist
- Eri Akamatsu – hair, make-up
- Satoru Iijima – A&R manager
- Kenichi Tanaka – artist manager
- Kenichi Nomura – A&R director
- Kosei Sasaki – A&R executive
- Kumiko Himeno – A&R executive
- Masaaki Saito – super executive
- Junya Nakasone – super executive
- Makoto Shioya – super executive
- Masao Yoshida – super executive
- Takaichi Motegi – super executive
- Mikio Tao – artist PR
- Kotaro Suzuki – artist PR
- Mayu kobayashi – artist PR
- Toshiba EMI Virgin Tokyo Marketing Group – media PR
- Toshiba EMI Sales Promotion – sales PR

== Charts ==
=== Weekly charts ===
Chart (2002)	Position
Japanese Oricon Albums Chart	3

=== Year-end charts ===
Chart (2002)	Position
Japanese Albums Chart	34

== Certifications ==
Region	Certification	Certified units/sales
Japan (RIAJ)	Platinum	510,000
