= HSwMS Munin =

Several ships of the Swedish Navy have been named HSwMS Munin, named after the son of Thor in Norse mythology:

- Munin (1886) was a torpedo boat launched in 1886 and which later was classified as patrol boat
- HSwMS Munin (1911) was a destroyer launched in 1911 and decommissioned in 1940
- HSwMS Munin (31) was a Mode-class destroyer launched in 1942 and decommissioned in 1968
- HSwMS Munin (P152) was a Hugin-class patrol boat launched in 1977 and decommissioned in 2001
