= Visão =

- Categories: News magazine
- Frequency: Weekly
- Circulation: 77,693 (September–October 2013)
- First issue: 25 March 1993; 33 years ago
- Company: Trust in News (TIN)
- Country: Portugal
- Based in: Lisbon
- Language: Portuguese
- Website: visao.sapo.pt

Visão (Portuguese: [viˈzɐ̃w̃]) is a Portuguese news magazine published weekly in Lisbon, Portugal.

== History and profile ==
Visão was first published on 25 March 1993. The magazine is the successor to the weekly newspaper O Jornal which was published between 1975 and 1992. The magazine distributed computer game Portugal 1111: A Conquista de Soure in 2004.

The founding owner of Visão was the Projornal company. The magazine was modelled on Time and Der Spiegel and is owned by Impresa. It was published weekly on Thursdays by Edimprensa, a joint subsidiary of Impresa and Edipresse. In 2018 Portuguese company Trust in News (TIN) acquired the magazine. The weekly has its headquarters in Lisbon.

Visão has a liberal political leaning. In addition to news sections the magazine has a 12-page culture section. Since 1999 the weekly has offered a culture and leisure supplement, Visão Sete.

== Circulation ==
The circulation of Visão was 99,198 copies in 2005. The magazine had a circulation of 100,000 copies in 2007. Its 2008 circulation was 92,850 copies. It rose to 103,000 copies in 2009. The magazine had a circulation of 103,114 copies in 2010 and 98,332 in 2011. The circulation of the magazine was 88,935 copies in 2012. Its circulation was 77,693 copies between September and October 2013.

== See also ==
- List of magazines in Portugal
