= Paradise Café (video game) =

1985 video game

- Developer: Damatta
- Publisher: Damatta
- Platform: ZX Spectrum
- Release: 1985
- Mode: Single-player

Paradise Café is a 1985 Portuguese video game developed by Damatta for the ZX Spectrum, whose identity as of 2025 is still unknown. The game portrays facets of the conservative Portuguese society of the time through the lens of the game's main character, searching for a partner to have sex with.

== Gameplay ==
The player controls the character searching for adult entertainment in a city.

== Reception and legacy ==
Paradise Café was one out of more than fifty video games developed in Portugal in the 1980s, and the most remembered of them all, according to Publico. Even players who didn't have the game were aware of its existence because of its sex and violence; moreover, most Portuguese ZX Spectrum owners played the game at the time.

In 2025, a limited 40th-anniversary edition of the game, with a new cover artwork, was released by Larvae Records.
