= Ugo Volt =

- Developer(s): Move Interactive, Produções de Software S.A.
- Director(s): Rogério Silva
- Producer(s): Michael Heinz
- Designer(s): Ricardo Teixeira
- Artist(s): Marco Leal
- Writer(s): Rogério Silva
- Composer(s): Dyna Media
- Engine: Unreal Engine 3 EMotion FX 2 AGEIA PhysX
- Platform(s): Microsoft Windows; Xbox 360
- Release: Cancelled
- Genre(s): First-person shooter, Third-person shooter
- Mode(s): Single Player

Ugo Volt (formerly FLOW: Prospects of Mayhem) was a game developed by Move Interactive S.A. (2005-2008), set in the 22nd century in a post-apocalyptic Lisbon due to global warming. It was also the first Portuguese game to be featured at E3 in 2006.

In 2007, due to financial problems, they decided to put Ugo Volt on hold for a time and started to create a new videogame Floribella: The Game in partnership with SIC, with purpose to raise some money to continue Ugo Volt. Unfortunately, after a long battle with the investors to secure funding and losing half the team in the process, Move Interactive eventually gave up and closed down the project. In June 2008, Move Interactive closed.

== Engine ==
The Ugo Volt tech demo in E3 2006 was powered by an in-house engine developed by Move Interactive. In 2007, the company switched to Unreal Engine 3 in an attempt to give the small development team more freedom to focus on the actual game.
