= Move Interactive =

Defunct Portuguese software and multimedia developer

Move Interactive S.A.
- Company type: Stock Corporation
- Industry: Video games
- Founded: 2001; 25 years ago Madeira Island, Portugal
- Founders: Roberto Varela; Rogério Silva
- Defunct: 2008
- Headquarters: Cascais, Portugal
- Area served: Worldwide
- Key people: Roberto Varela (CEO); Rogério Silva
- Products: Ugo Volt
- Number of employees: 13 (2006)
- Website: Official website

Move Interactive, Produções de Software S.A. (referred to as Move Interactive S.A.) was a Portuguese software and multimedia developer.

In their first year of operation the firm won the Madeira Innovation Prize for entrepreneurship (in Portuguese) and began a relationship with Gesventure, the noted Portuguese venture capital firm, that continues today.

In 2005, the company secured founding from PME Investimentos and Banif New Capital, allowing them to increase the pace of development for their debut project, Ugo Volt, a videogame that is aimed at the international market, and if successful, it will be the first of that scale to be developed in Portugal.

On November 26, 2007, in partnership with SIC, Move Interactive released the Floribella video game, (in Portuguese) based on the popular series Floribella.

Ugo Volt was also the first Portuguese game to be featured at E3 (2006).
