= Lichdom: Battlemage =

2014 video game

- Developers: Xaviant; Bigmoon Entertainment
- Publishers: Xaviant (PC); Maximum Games (PS4, XONE)
- Engine: CryEngine 3
- Platforms: Microsoft Windows; PlayStation 4 Xbox One
- Release: Microsoft Windows: NA: August 26, 2014; PlayStation 4 & Xbox One: NA: April 19, 2016; EU: April 22, 2016
- Genre: Action role-playing
- Mode: Single-player

Lichdom: Battlemage is a first-person action role-playing video game that was developed by independent American game developer Xaviant and published by Maximum Games for Microsoft Windows, PlayStation 4 and Xbox One, running on the CryEngine 3 game engine. It was released as an alpha version for Steam Early Access on March 19, 2014, and then fully released in North America on August 26, 2014. A console version was released on April 19, 2016 in North America and on April 22, 2016 in Europe.

The game allows the player to traverse the main quest as a male or female character. Each character has subtle differences in their origin story. There are challenge levels which the player can choose to do as battle-oriented side-quests. Gameplay centers on enemies dropping randomized loot based on the rarity level the character has achieved through reaching checkpoints. The player's spells can be further enhanced by increasing the level of a Sigil through accomplishing specific goals.

== Gameplay ==
Gameplay is driven by a central character named the Dragon whose gender can be determined by the player. The player traverses a linear world connected by checkpoints and fast travel locations known as Reliquaries. Unlike other games, magic does not require any form of resource pool and can be cast without limit.

The player is assisted by the female or male character not chosen during character creation. The player acts as a scout known as the Gryphon. When the player finishes the game, they can continue gameplay with the same character to build stronger spells by starting a New Game Plus.

=== Magic ===
The player character can have 3 Sigils applied at any given time. Sigils act as elemental schools of magic for the player to cast. This includes Fire, Ice, Lightning, Corruption, and more which are unlocked as the player progresses through the story-line. At a Reliquary, the player can switch between which Sigil they have equipped. Each Sigil can be leveled up by completing an objective which is shown when the player inspects it. Leveling it up allows for the player to enhance one of three statistics.

Magic spells can be equipped and have three components that players receive by looting enemies or objects in the world. First, the player chooses a Sigil to craft the spell under. The spell can only be used by the Sigil it is made with. Next, the player chooses a Pattern to attach the crafted spell, determining how the spell is delivered. The three types of Patterns are: Targeted, which shoots a direct version of the element; Nova, which teleports the player and creates a wave that damages nearby enemies, and AoE, which damages all enemies that are within range of the spell. Finally, one or multiple Augments can be applied to the crafting recipe depending on what the Pattern allows for. Augments enhance certain aspects of the spell's statistics in specialized ways. A Destruction Augment will allow for the player to deal more damage when the spell is cast, a Control Augment will cause the elemental-specific effect to be enhanced, and a Mastery Augment will debuff an enemy and allow for more damage to be inflicted. Spells that have been crafted can likewise be deconstructed into smaller components.

The statistics of all of these components are determined by various rarities, ranging from common to legendary. These are further enhanced by the rarity level that is increased at various scripted checkpoints in the game. Certain components of one rarity can be enhanced by other components, however, this is limited to the rarity of the other components.

Shields are crafted much like offensive spells and come in three different styles. An Agile Shield will allow the player to teleport short ranges very quickly, and without limit, in order to dodge enemy attacks. However, the shield takes a lot of damage if the player tries to block. The time it takes to recover in between casting Targeted spells is reduced by this shield. A Strategic Shield allows for the player character to perform what is called a Galvanized Block which negates damage done to the player and inflicts damage back on the enemy. The Strategic Shield also increases the frequency in which you can cast an AoE spell. A Tactical Shield makes it easier to perform a Galvanized Block by increasing the time frame the player has to react to the enemy's attacks and also allows the player to cast Nova spells more often. The shield has three layers represented by three bars of life on the player's HUD. Once a layer is depleted, it cannot be regenerated naturally unless the player uses a Shield Replenishment Orb. If all layers of a shield are depleted, the player dies and respawns at the nearest checkpoint.

== Plot ==
If the player has chosen to play the female character, her sister is abducted by Shax after a dispute about a piece of jewelry the player character is selling. If the player has chosen to play the male character, Shax murders the player character's wife after refusing to sell Shax a sword. The player character is then awoken by Roth who reveals that he has chosen him or her to be his Dragon. Whichever character the player did not choose leaves by Roth's request to later aid the Dragon and become known as the Gryphon.

== Development ==
The game was first announced in May 2010. It utilizes the CryEngine 3 and Simplygon technology in processing the LoD models.

In 2015, Maximum Games contracted Bigmoon Entertainment to develop the PS4 and Xbox One port from Lichdom: Battlemage.

== Reception ==
Reception

Aggregate scores
Aggregator	Score
GameRankings	72.23%
Metacritic	69/100

Review scores
Publication	Score
Game Informer	8/10
GameSpot	6/10
IGN	6.5/10

Game critics met Lichdom: Battlemage with mixed reviews. Aggregating game review websites GameRankings and Metacritic gave the game 72.23% and 69/100. Game Informer rated the game 8/10, praising the story, graphics, voice acting, and the customization system, stating that it had enough depth to continue to be fresh into New Game Plus. They did, however, criticize the game's repetitive nature. IGN gave a score of 6.5/10 stating that it provided decent challenge, but there were too few checkpoints, linear level design, and a lack of variety in enemies. GameSpot praised the combat but criticized repetitious story and gameplay with its 6/10 score. The console release of the game was heavily criticized for its poor performance, with the game rarely exceeding 20 frames per second, and loading times of over two minutes. The Xbox One version was initially criticized for its low brightness and excessive screen tearing, but these issues have since been fixed via updates.
