= Alentejo: Tinto's Law =

2024 video game

Alentejo: Tinto’s Law
- Developer: Loading Studios
- Publisher: Teknamic Software
- Director: Ivan Barroso
- Designers: Ivan Barroso; Vasco Oliveira
- Programmer: Daniel Penão
- Artist: Marta Vaz
- Composer: Pankyonshii
- Platforms: Game Boy, Web browser
- Release: Web browser: EU: November 30, 2024; Game Boy: EU: February 25, 2025
- Genre: Action role-playing game
- Mode: Single-player

Alentejo: Tinto’s Law is a 2024 action role-playing game developed by Loading Studios and published by Teknamic Software for the Game Boy and web browsers. The game is loosely inspired by the 1991 RTP television series Alentejo Sem Lei and mid-1960s Spaghetti Western films.

The story follows Gildo, a mysterious newcomer to the village of Tinto, as he works to disrupt the illegal tinto (red wine) traffic in 19th-century Alentejo, Portugal. The Game Boy version marks the first commercial Portuguese-developed game released for the platform.

== Gameplay ==
Alentejo: Tinto’s Law is a single-player action role-playing game featuring narrative-driven gameplay with puzzle-solving elements. The game is divided into two sections: an overworld, focusing on exploration and action challenges, and underground levels containing puzzles and collectible power-ups.

The narrative follows Gildo as he attempts to dismantle Baron Tinto’s control of the region’s red wine trade, centered around a newly constructed train station. Players must gather resources, form alliances, and plan a train robbery to halt the operation.

== Development and release ==
Alentejo: Tinto’s Law was developed by a team from Loading Studios, previously known for The Fisherman: A Codefish Tale, winner of a 2023 PlayStation Talents award. The team included Ivan Barroso (director), Vasco Oliveira (level designer), Daniel Penão (programmer), and Marta Vaz (artist), with music composed by Pankyonshii. Marketing Art was provided by Martim Alves, with additional services by Tiago Colaço. According to Vasco Oliveira, the game was created as a retro speculative design project—imagining what a Portuguese Game Boy title might have looked like in the 1990s, a period when none were actually developed. Alentejo: Tinto’s Law draws inspiration from popular films of the era, including the 20th-century Spaghetti Westerns, as well as the 1991 RTP television series Alentejo Sem Lei.

The game was released digitally in November 2024 for browsers and physically for the Game Boy via cartridge in February 2025 by Teknamic Software.

== Reception ==
=== Reviews ===
Alentejo: Tinto’s Law received generally positive reviews, particularly for its story, puzzles, humor, and historical references to 19th-century Iberia. Criticism focused mainly on the limited variety of music tracks and basic shooting mechanics.

=== Accolades ===
At the 2024 Indie DB Indie of the Year Awards, the game was a finalist in the "Upcoming Games – Role-Playing" category. It was also a finalist at the DevGamm Spotlight Awards ("Reveal of the Year") and won "Best National Game" at the Geeks d'Ouro awards. In June 2025, the game was distinguished as a Runner-Up and won an Honorable Mention in the "Fnac Novos Talentos" contest in the "Videogames" category.

== Future ==
In February 2025, Loading Studios announced a sequel titled Alentejo: The Tinto and The Ugly.
