= Sugar High (album) =

Studio album by Chihiro Onitsuka
- Released: December 11, 2002
- Recorded: at the Melody Star Studio, Garyou Tensei Music Works, Landmark Studio
- Genre: Baroque pop, symphonic rock
- Length: 41:32 (except running time of bonus disc); 10:24 (bonus disc)
- Language: Japanese, English
- Label: Toshiba EMI/Virgin Tokyo
- Producer: Takefumi Haketa

Chihiro Onitsuka chronology
This Armor (2002)	Sugar High (2002)	Las Vegas (2007)

Alternative cover
- The first press featuring bonus disc

Sugar High is the third studio album by Japanese singer-songwriter Chihiro Onitsuka, released in December 2002.

The album came out only nine months after its predecessor This Armor, and it comprises nine tracks that were previously unreleased as the singles. The album title was quoted from the lyrics of a song sung on the American motion picture Empire Records.

The first press of the album features bonus 8cm compact disc including another version of "Castle･Imitation" and its backing track.

Since Onitsuka cancelled the release of fourth studio album and left both the management office and record label in 2004, Sugar High became the final non-compilation album she released under the Virgin Tokyo label distributed by Toshiba EMI.

== Track listing ==
All songs arranged and produced by Takefumi Haketa.

CD
No.	Title	Writer(s)	Length
1.	"Not Your God"	Chihiro Onitsuka	2:53
2.	"Koe (声)"	Onitsuka, Takefumi Haketa	4:44
3.	"Rebel Luck"	Onitsuka	4:19
4.	"Tiger in My Love"	Onitsuka	4:52
5.	"Castle Imitation" (album version)	Onitsuka, Haketa	4:58
6.	"Hyōryū no Hane (漂流の羽根)"	Onitsuka	4:22
7.	"Suna no Tate (砂の盾)"	Onitsuka, Haketa	4:43
8.	"King of Solitude"	Onitsuka, Haketa	4:59
9.	"Borderline"	Onitsuka, Haketa	5:45

3-inch CD single (bonus disc)
No.	Title	Writer(s)	Length
1.	"Castle Imitation"	Onitsuka, Haketa	5:14
2.	"Castle Imitation" (instrumental)	Onitsuka, Haketa	5:14

== Personnel ==
- Chihiro Onitsuka – Vocals
- Takefumi Haketa – Acoustic piano, rhodes piano, wurlitzer, harpsichord
- Takashi Nishiumi – Acoustic guitar, electric guitar
- Hitoshi Watanabe – Bass
- Hitoshi Kusunoki – Drums
- Toshiyuki Sugino – Drums
- Ikuo Kakehashi – Percussion, conga, flame drum, tablas
- Chieko Kinbara – Violin
- Yoshihiko Eida – Violin
- Haruko Yano – Violin
- Joe Kuwata – Violin
- Yukiko Iwato – Violin
- Naoru Komiya – Violin
- Nagisa Kiriyama – Violin
- Norito Ohbayashi – Violin
- Yukinori Murata – Violin
- Osamu Iyoku – Violin
- Motoko Fujiie – Violin
- Hijiri Kuwano – Violin
- Yuji Yamada – Viola
- Sachie Ohnuma – Viola
- Manami Tokutaka – Viola
- Hirohito Furugawara – Viola
- Masami Horisawa – Cello
- Hiroyasu Yamamoto – Cello
- Hiroki Kashiwagi – Cello
- Haruki Matsuba – Cello
- Yohei Matsuoka – Cello
- Gaichi Ishibashi – Oboe

== Certifications ==
Region	Certification	Certified units/sales
Japan (RIAJ)	Gold	295,000

== Charts ==
=== Weekly charts ===
Chart (2002)	Position
Japanese Oricon Albums Chart	2

=== Year-end charts ===
Chart (2003)	Position
Japanese Albums Chart	41

== Release history ==
Country	Date	Label	Format	Catalog number
Japan	December 11, 2002	Toshiba-EMI/Virgin Tokyo	CD	TOCT-24901 (limited edition with bonus disc)
Japan	December 11, 2002	Toshiba-EMI/Virgin Tokyo	CD	TOCT-24902
Japan	March 11, 2009	EMI Music Japan	SHM-CD	TOCT-95060

== Other media ==
"Castle Imitation" was used as the end credits song in the video game Breath of Fire: Dragon Quarter
