= Portugal 1111: A Conquista de Soure =

2004 video game

Portugal 1111: A conquista de Soure
- Developer: Ciberbit
- Publisher: Visão
- Composers: Amílcar Cardoso; João Redondo
- Platform: Windows
- Release: Portugal: April 22, 2004
- Genre: Real-time strategy
- Mode: Single-player

Portugal 1111: A Conquista de Soure ("Portugal 1111: The Conquest of Soure") is a real-time strategy game developed by Ciberbit, a Portuguese multimedia company, in partnership with the Municipality of Soure and historians from the University of Coimbra. The game depicts the historical events of the Portuguese Reconquista, when the Christians fought against Moorish invaders.

It was the first commercial video game completely produced and designed in Portugal.

The game, a historic real-time strategy game similar to Microsoft's Age of Empires, was published by the Portuguese magazine Visão and was released in 2004.
