= Insomnia (Chihiro Onitsuka album) =

Studio album by Chihiro Onitsuka
- Released: March 7, 2001
- Recorded: March 2000 – January 2001, at the Melody Star Studio, Landmark Studio, Bunkamura Studio, Artworks Mouri Studio, Toshiba EMI Studio TERRA C, Toshiba EMI Studio No.3
- Genre: J-pop, piano rock
- Length: 53:57
- Label: Toshiba EMI/Virgin Tokyo
- Producer: Takefumi Haketa; Nozomu Tsuchiya

Chihiro Onitsuka chronology
Insomnia (2001)	This Armor (2002)

Singles from Insomnia
- 1. "Gekkō" Released: August 9, 2000; 2. "Cage" Released: November 8, 2000; 3. "Memai"/"Edge" Released: February 9, 2001

Insomnia (インソムニア, Insomunia) is the debut album by Japanese singer-songwriter Chihiro Onitsuka, released in March 2001. The album features acoustic-oriented production arranged by Takefumi Haketa, who produced all her studio albums released under the Virgin Tokyo label distributed by Toshiba EMI. It comprises 11 tracks written by Onitsuka, including hit singles "Cage", "Edge", "Memai", and her most well-known and successful song "Gekkō."

The lead-off track "Gekkō" was initially used as a theme song for Trick starring Yukie Nakama and Hiroshi Abe, a television drama series aired on Asahi TV in 2000. The song was released as a single in August 2000 and became a smash hit. At the end of the album, a different rendition of the song was included.

While "Gekkō" remained on the chart, "Cage" and "Memai" were subsequently released as singles. The lyrics of the latter were acclaimed, winning the 43rd Japan Record Awards for "Best Lyrics" in December 2001. It became the first top-ten hit single for her, peaking at number six on the charts.

Before Onitsuka gained popularity through "Gekkō," she had already released a single "Shine" arranged and produced by Nozomu Tsuchiya. A song was newly recorded for the Insomnia album. The album version arranged by Haketa features the stiff sound of the piano he plays. A song originally released as a B-side for her debut single called "Back Door" was also re-recorded.

"Rasen" (a song whose working title was "My Fragile Life") was featured on the 2002 motion picture Wasabi directed by Luc Besson and starred by Ryōko Hirosue.

Music videos of seven tracks included on the album were produced: "Gekkō" (both single and album versions), "Cage," "Memai," "Edge," "We Can Go," and a studio live take of "Shine." All of them are available on a DVD entitled Me and My Devil issued in April 2001.

== Commercial success ==
Insomnia has been the most successful album for Chihiro Onitsuka. The album debuted at number one on the Oricon chart, with the sales in excess of 440,000 copies. It made her the then-second youngest female chart-topper on the Oricon, following Hikaru Utada, who had already reached the number-one spot with her debut album First Love at the age of 16 in 1999. Onitsuka retained the record for over three years, until overtaken by Under My Skin by Avril Lavigne in May 2004.

It sold over a million copies in the first month and a further 345,000 in the following 20 months. It was certified triple platinum by the Recording Industry Association of Japan, for shipments of over 1,200,000 units.

In March 2002, Insomnia won the 16th Japan Gold Disc Awards for "Best-Selling Rock Album of the Year".

== Track listing ==
All songs composed by Chihiro Onitsuka, except "Edge" "Call" and "Memai" co-written by Takefumi Haketa

No.	Title	Writer(s)	Arranger(s)	Length
1.	"Gekkō (月光, "Moonlight")"		Takefumi Haketa	5:02
2.	"Innocence"		Haketa	5:20
3.	"Back Door" (Album version)		Haketa, Nozomu Tsuchiya	5:08
4.	"Edge"		Haketa	4:32
5.	"We Can Go"	Onitsuka	Haketa	4:48
6.	"Call"		Haketa	5:19
7.	"Shine" (Album version)		Haketa, Tsuchiya	4:57
8.	"Cage"		Haketa, Tsuchiya	4:33
9.	"Rasen (螺旋, "Spiral")"		Haketa	4:06
10.	"Memai (眩暈, "Dizziness")"		Haketa	5:08
11.	"Gekkō" (Album version)		Haketa	5:08

== Personnel ==
- Chihiro Onitsuka – lead and backing vocals
- Takefumi Haketa – acoustic piano, organ, acoustic guitar, loop, sampling, drum programming, computer programming, pad, backing vocals
- Takashi Nishiumi – acoustic guitar, electric guitar, dobro guitar, backing vocals
- Nozomu Tsuchiya – synthesizer programming
- Hitoshi Watanabe – electric bass
- Tasuku – electric guitar
- Gen Tamura – pedal steel
- Hitoshi Kusunoki – drums
- Yasuo Sano – drums
- Hideki Ataka – drum programming
- Toshiko Ezaki – backing vocals
- Naoto Takahashi – violin
- Kiyo Kido – violin
- Takahiro Enokido – viola
- Kazuki Kashiwagi – cello
- Ikuo Kakehashi – ethnic congas, tambourine, shaker, tree bells, harmony ball, Chinese bell, blossom bell, snare, triangle, bodhran

== Release history ==
Country	Date	Label	Format	Catalog number
Japan	March 7, 2001	Toshiba-EMI/Virgin Tokyo	CD	TOCT-24560
Japan	March 11, 2009	EMI Music Japan	SHM-CD	TOCT-95058

== Awards ==
Japan Record Awards
Year	Title	Category
2001 (43rd)	"Memai"	Best Lyrics

Japan Gold Disc Award
Year	Album	Category
2001 (16th)	Insomnia	Best-Selling Rock Album of the Year

== Certifications ==
Region	Certification	Certified units/sales
Japan (RIAJ)	3× Platinum	1,200,000^{^}
^{^} Shipments figures based on certification alone.

== Charts ==
=== Weekly charts ===
Chart (2001)	Position
Japanese Oricon Albums Chart	1

=== Year-end charts ===
Chart (2001)	Position
Japanese Albums Chart	16

=== All-time charts ===
Chart (1970–)	Position
Japanese Albums Chart	169
