= Munin (video game) =

2014 video game

- Developer: Gojira
- Publisher: Daedalic Entertainment
- Platforms: Windows, OS X, iOS
- Release: June 10, 2014
- Genre: Puzzle-platform
- Mode: Single-player

Munin is a video game published by Daedalic Entertainment on June 10, 2014. The game was developed by Portuguese indie game company Gojira. It is a puzzle-platform game, with references to Norse gods and monsters. An iOS version was released on July 7, 2014.

== Gameplay ==
In the game, the main protagonist, Munin, has had her wings taken by the Norse god Loki. This forces her to move around on two legs to retrieve her wings. Munin requires players to rotate parts of the environment in the game, to allow them to complete each level. The game's levels are split into nine different chapters, with a total of 77 levels, or roughly 7 hours of playing time in the game. Each level in the game is separated into multiple "tiles", with each containing feathers which must be collected in order to progress to the next level. Several other features are included in the game to make it more difficult. These include elements which change the environment such as switches and items influenced by physics, and traps such as boulders and lava. The art in the game is influenced by its Nordic setting, with simple artwork throughout the levels.

== Reception ==
Reception

Aggregate score
Aggregator	Score
Metacritic	PC: 68/100 iOS: 70/100

Review scores
Publication	Score
GameSpot	6/10
Polygon	7.5/10

Munin received mostly average or mixed reviews from critics. Critics on Metacritic praised the gameplay, but found the graphics and story to be poor. The Polygon review found that the puzzle design and the unique levels in the game were captivating, but the inconsistent physics and bugs held the game back. GameSpot also praised the variety in the game, however criticized the game for being overly frustrating at times.
