= Las Vegas (album) =

Studio album by Burger/Ink
- Released: 1996
- Genres: Minimal techno, dub techno, IDM
- Length: 72:53
- Labels: Harvest; Matador

Las Vegas (stylised as [Las Vegas] or [las vegas]) is the debut studio album by Burger/Ink, a German duo composed of Jörg Burger and Mike Ink. It was released in Europe in 1996 on Harvest Records and subsequently released in the United States in 1998 on Matador Records. Las Vegas remains the sole album released under the name Burger/Ink. In 2007, Burger and Voigt formed another project under the name Mohn and released an album in 2012.

== Background and composition ==
Jorg Burger and Wolfgang Voigt first met in the early 1980s and began producing electronic music in the late 1980s. In the early 1990s they co-founded the Trance Atlantic record label and opened the Delirium record store in Cologne, the latter also by Michael Mayer, Jürgen Paape, and Reinhard Voigt who would all co-found the minimal techno label Kompakt in 1998 alongside Burger and Voigt.

Burger and Voigt discussed the direction of the album for three months before producing any material; in a 2007 interview Burger stated this was to "eliminate any unnecessary doubling of our ideas." Burger recorded loops using guitar and bass, which were passed on to Voigt for further work.

Voigt has stated that the album is dedicated as a tribute to Avalon by Roxy Music. Critics have noted the album's song titles as referencing the group.

== Reception ==
The Toronto Star said that "Las Vegas twists shimmering, looped keyboard parts and filtered sound effects around driving house basslines for a repetitive effect that's lulling and hypnotic, but at the same time difficult to sit still through."

John Bush of AllMusic wrote: "Quite distanced from the legion of echo-chamber drumkick records in Mike Ink's catalog, Las Vegas presents a series of languid trance numbers that reprise the deep-sea dub of his Studio 1 recordings but without the straight-ahead four-four beats." In 2017, Pitchfork included the album on their list of the Top 50 IDM Albums of All Time, placing at 33. Writing for the article, Simon Reynolds stated that "[Las Vegas] marks a moment for IDM in which ideas were coalescing and new conversations were arising. Some of its influence is circumstantial; few predicted the globally prominent rise of Cologne's dance music and Kompakt Records soon after its release, or that Matador's issuing of the album in the U.S. two years later would open its indie-rock listeners to electronic beats."

== Track listing ==
No.	Title	Length
1.	"Avalon"	6:45
2.	"Elvism"	5:14
3.	"Flesh & Bleed"	4:43
4.	"Twelve Miles High"	11:22
5.	"Milk & Honey"	4:57
6.	"Bring Trance Back (To Las Vegas) [Blue Hotel]"	7:16
7.	"The Jealous Guy from Memphis"	6:38
8.	"Love Is the Drug [Paris Texas]"	11:01
9.	"Do the Strand"	8:19
10.	"Swiss Made"	6:38
Total length:		72:53
