= Neighbours from Hell 2: On Vacation =

2004 video game

Neighbors from Hell: On Vacation
- European PC version cover art
- Developer: JoWooD Vienna (Note: iOS and Android releases were developed by Big Moon Entertainment. Back from Hell compilation was developed by Farbworks.)
- Publishers: EU: JoWooD Productions; NA: Cinemaware; WW: THQ Nordic (Note: Android, iOS, macOS, PlayStation 4, Xbox One, Switch and Back from Hell.)
- Director: Michael Paeck
- Producer: Michael Paeck
- Designers: Michael Paeck; Gerhard E. Kodys
- Programmers: Andreas Meissl; Bernhard Gruber
- Artist: Stefan M. Halegger
- Writer: Gerhard E. Kodys
- Composers: Wolfgang Tockner; Robbie Ost
- Engine: Unity (remastered)
- Platforms: Microsoft Windows; Nintendo DS; Android; iOS; macOS; Nintendo Switch; PlayStation 4; Xbox One
- Release: Windows: PAL: February 20, 2004; NA: March 28, 2006; Nintendo DS: PAL: June 30, 2009; iOS & Android: WW: May 25, 2017; macOS: WW: June 22, 2017; Switch & PlayStation 4 & Xbox One: WW: October 8, 2020
- Genres: Puzzle, strategy
- Mode: Single-player

Neighbours From Hell 2: On Vacation (German: Böse Nachbarn 2: Urlaub mit Hindernissen, lit. 'Evil Neighbours 2: Vacation with Obstacles'), known in the United States as Neighbors from Hell: On Vacation, is a puzzle strategy video game developed and published by JoWooD for Microsoft Windows, Nintendo DS, Android and iOS. It is the sequel to Neighbours from Hell. It was released for Windows on February 20, 2004 in Europe and March 28, 2006 in the United States.

A remastered compilation of the first two games titled Neighbours Back from Hell was released on Nintendo Switch, PlayStation 4 and Xbox One in October 2020. It features increased framerate and HD visuals.

== Gameplay ==
Neighbours From Hell 2: On Vacation is a point-and-click puzzle strategy game. Where the player controls Woody, as he travels to various locations around the world. In later levels the player may encounter Neighbour's Mom, who poses the same threat to the player as her son. As the game progresses, the player unlocks various new locations, such as: China, India, and Mexico.

For each level, the player receives 3 lives; each one are lost by getting caught by Mr. Rottweiler (or his mom). If they lose all lives, the game ends, and they must start the level from the beginning.

== Plot ==
Mr. Rottweiler, tired of Woody's jokes, goes on holiday around the world with his mother. He didn't know however that he became a star of the next season of the self-titled reality show, which is another opportunity for Woody to make pranks. In the end, the ship they travel with collides with an iceberg and sinks, but Rottweiler rescues himself finding a lifeboat, sailing ashore with his mother and unknowingly with Woody.

== Release ==
Neighbours from Hell 2: On Vacation was developed by JoWooD Productions. It was announced by Big Ben Interactive, at the European Computer Trade Show (ECTS) in August 2003, and was scheduled to be released on October 24 of that same year. The game was released on February 20, 2004, alongside a bundle with the first game. Weeks after the release of the game, a demo version was released on April 27, 2004.

=== Ports and re-releases ===
A selection of levels from the game were included with the GameCube and Xbox version of the original Neighbours from Hell, which was released exclusively in Europe in 2005.

A Nintendo DS port of the game, simply titled Neighbours from Hell, was announced in 2007. It was released exclusively in Europe on June 30, 2009. While the cover art and title imply that the game is a port of the original game, the game only contains the sequel. A North American release by DreamCatcher Interactive under the name of Prank'd - Pranking Your Way Around the World was planned and was even rated by the ESRB, but never materialised.

The original Microsoft Windows version was digitally rereleased on GOG.com with the previous game by JoWood on June 9, 2009. It was released on Steam by Nordic Games on November 7, 2013 after successfully getting Greenlit by the community.

A mobile port of the game was released worldwide by THQ Nordic for iOS and Android on May 25, 2017 on the App Store and Google Play, respectively. A port for macOS was released on the App Store on June 22 of the same year.

== Reception ==
Reception

Review scores
Publication	Score
Gamekult	4/10
Jeuxvideo.com	12/20
PC Games (DE)	6/10
GRY-Online.pl	6/10

The game received mixed reviews from critics. While they praised the game for the premise and presentation, they criticised its short length and low difficulty. PC Games described that the game is "still fun, but not for very long - after half a day the credits are already rolling across the screen." With Kevin Kuipers of Gamekult, expressing his disappointment, as he found the game easier than its predecessor, alongwith a lack of replayability, after completing it 100%.
