= Syndrome (Chihiro Onitsuka album) =

- Standard edition cover

Studio album by Chihiro Onitsuka
- Released: 1 February 2017
- Recorded: 2016
- Genre: J-Pop; rock
- Length: 49:50
- Label: Victor Entertainment
- Producer: Masato Suzuki

Chihiro Onitsuka chronology
Tricky Sisters Magic Burger (2014)	Syndrome (2017)	Tiny Screams (2017)

Alternative covers
- Limited edition cover

Singles from Syndrome
- 1. "Good Bye My Love" Released: November 2, 2016

"Syndrome" (Japanese: シンドローム, Hepburn: Sindorōmu) is the seventh studio album by Japanese singer songwriter Chihiro Onitsuka. It was released on February 1, 2017 by Victor Entertainment. The album is considered to represent her revival in popularity from her slump.

Limited edition of the album is accompanied with the bonus live compilation album named "Live Best Selection 2016: Tigerlily". It was recorded at the two shows in Tokyo and Osaka during the singer's "Tigerlily" tour.

In Japan, Syndrome debuted at number fifteen on the Oricon weekly albums chart, selling 6,248 copies in its first week. The album has sold over 11,140 copies as of 2018 and became her tenth most successful album.

== Promotion ==
=== Singles ===
"Good Bye My Love" was released as the lead single from the album on November 2, 2016. It received widespread acclaim from music critics. Many critics have referred to her revival from her bad vocal condition started from around 2012. The song has peaked at number thirty-five on the Oricon Weekly Singles Chart.

== Commercial performance ==
Syndrome debuted at number fifteen on the Oricon weekly albums chart, selling 6,248 physical copies in its first week. The album has sold over 11,140 physical copies as of 2018 and became her tenth most successful album. Also, the album entered at number twenty on the Billboard Japan Hot Albums chart.

== Track listing ==
All music is composed by Chihiro Onitsuka and Masato Suzuki.

Standard edition / Digital download
No.	Title	Length
1.	"Good Bye My Love"	6:07
2.	"Ao no Hakobune" (碧の方舟)	5:51
3.	"Gensokyoku" (弦葬曲)	5:01
4.	"Sweet Hi-Five"	4:53
5.	"Ultimate Fiction"	5:57
6.	"Kanashimi no Kikyu" (悲しみの気球)	4:59
7.	"Chandelier" (シャンデリア)	5:33
8.	"Hi no Tori" (火の鳥)	5:24
9.	"Good Bye My Love" (Acoustic version)	6:02
Total length:		49:50

Limited edition bonus disc "Live Best Selection 2016: Tigerlily"
No.	Title	Length
1.	"Gekko" (月光)	5:27
2.	"Memai" (眩暈)	5:06
3.	"Ryuseigun" (流星群)	5:24
4.	"Watashi to Waltz wo" (私とワルツを)	5:37
5.	"Magical World"	5:02
6.	"Everyhome"	5:55
7.	"Hotaru" (蛍)	6:15
8.	"Kaerimichi wo Nakushite" (帰り路をなくして)	6:35
9.	"Wakusei no Mori" (惑星の森)	5:05
10.	"Natsu no Tsumi" (夏の罪)	4:42
Total length:		55:11

== Charts ==
=== Weekly charts ===
Chart (2016)	Peak position
Japanese Albums (Billboard)	20
Japan Top Albums Sales (Billboard)	19
Japanese Physical Albums (Oricon)	15

== Release history ==
Region	Date	Format	Edition	Label
Japan	February 1, 2017	CD; digital download	Standard	Victor Entertainment
Japan	February 1, 2017	CD/DVD	Limited	Victor Entertainment
France	November 7, 2018	CD+LP+DVD	French special edition	
