= Syndrome (video game) =

2016 video game

- Developers: Camel 101; Bigmoon Entertainment
- Publishers: Camel 101; RedDeerGames (Switch)
- Engine: Unity 5
- Platforms: Linux; Mac; Microsoft Windows; Xbox One; PlayStation 4 Nintendo Switch
- Release: October 6, 2016: Windows, Mac, Linux; October 6, 2016; Xbox One; September 29, 2017; PlayStation 4; October 11, 2017; Nintendo Switch; March 11, 2022
- Genres: Survival horror First-person shooter

Syndrome is a science fiction survival horror video game developed by Camel 101 and Bigmoon Entertainment for Microsoft Windows, PlayStation 4, Xbox One, Mac, Linux and Nintendo Switch. It takes place inside the "Valkenburg", a drifting spaceship where something has gone wrong, killing most of its crew. The player controls a character that wakes up in the spaceship with no memory of what happened. The player's actions are not limited to running and hiding; in Syndrome the player can also engage in combat, although the available weapons and ammunition are limited. The game also plays heavily with psychological horror: the main character is constantly plagued by visual and auditory hallucinations, never knowing what is real and what is not.

== Gameplay ==
The game is played in a first-person view. While exploring, the player can pick up and interact with objects like doors, keypads, computer consoles, drawers, machinery, etc., and use weapons (both melee and long range). The player faces powerful and numerous enemy creatures, which means that the best strategy is often to avoid combat. Although the player can fight, it is recommended that the ammunition be saved for the most difficult encounters. One particularly powerful creature, known as "the Beast", cannot be harmed by weapons, and must be evaded throughout the game.

Soon after waking up, the main character meets two other survivors over the radio. Both will try to help him, but each one of them will have a different version of what happened in the ship. This adds even more confusion to the already frail mental state of the main character.

The action takes place in the 8 levels of the ship, which are divided into living areas, labs, working places, computer rooms, etc. As the game progresses, the player is required to frequently backtrack between the different decks of the ship to accomplish their objectives.

Instead of having automatic checkpoints, players can only save the game at save stations that are located at various locations throughout the ship.

== Plot ==
The game begins aboard the spaceship Valkenburg with the player character, identified by the ship's computer as Chief Technician Galen, awakening from cryo-sleep to find the ship powered down and seemingly deserted. He soon discovers that the majority of the crew is either dead or converted into hostile half-human half-machine creatures. Record logs left behind by the crew reveal that the Valkenburg had earlier brought aboard an alien artifact, which caused crew members to go insane and become violent.

Galen is contacted by Commander Neomi, the commander of a marine detachment aboard the ship, who asks him to come to her location and help her and her marines out of the section of the ship they're locked in. Later, Galen is contacted by James "Jimmy" Marko, a technician who warns Galen that Neomi cannot be trusted and has been shooting survivors on sight to contain the situation. Jimmy instead directs Galen to restore power to the ship so they can travel to a populated system for help.

When Neomi learns that Galen is restoring power to the ship, she lures him to an exterior section of the ship and attempts to kill him by depressurizing the area. Galen escapes with Jimmy's assistance, and following Jimmy's advice, he kills Neomi's marines by flushing them out into space. Galen continues following Jimmy's directions, bringing down the ship's computer firewalls so Jimmy can hack in and activate the defense systems to deal with the creatures as well as Neomi.

However, Galen is betrayed by Jimmy, who reveals that he is in control of the creatures and wants to bring the ship to a human settlement and take it over. Jimmy also reveals that "Galen" is actually Chief of Security Agon, who was manipulated by the artifact into killing the crew and who suffered a mental breakdown as a result and assumed Galen's identity.

Agon realizes that "Jimmy" is actually the artifact using Jimmy as a mouthpiece, and forms an uneasy alliance with Neomi in order to stop Jimmy. Agon manages to track down Jimmy/the artifact and destroy its power sources, but meanwhile Neomi is fatally wounded while battling Jimmy's cyborgs. Agon travels to the ship's shuttle bay, where the artifact reveals it is still active and in control of the ship, and will not allow Agon to escape. However, instead of attempting to escape in a shuttle, Agon activates the shuttle's weapons, sacrificing himself and blowing up the Valkenburg and everything on board.

== Development ==
Syndrome was the first survival horror game developed by Camel 101. Development started in late 2014 with the 3 core members of Camel 101. By then, the game was called Sleepers. The name was later changed to Syndrome to avoid copyright issues with the movie Sleepers. In May 2015, the game was first announced with an announcement trailer. On September 30, 2015, Camel 101 partnered with Bigmoon Entertainment to help with development and port the game to consoles. Syndrome was Greenlit on Steam by the community on October 9, 2015. The game was released on PC, Mac and Linux on October 6, 2016.
