= Chihiro Onitsuka =

Japanese singer-songwriter (born 1980)

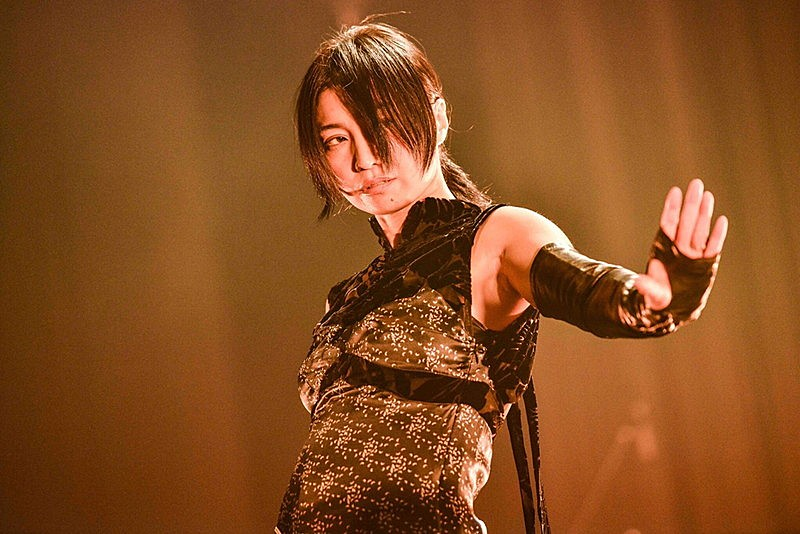
- Chihiro Onitsuka at concert tour in 2018

Background information
- Born: October 30, 1980 (age 45)
- Origin: Nango, Miyazaki, Japan
- Genres: Folk, folk-rock
- Occupation: Singer・songwriter
- Instrument: Piano
- Years active: 2000–2004; 2007–present
- Labels: Toshiba EMI/Virgin Tokyo; Universal Sigma/A&M Records; For Life Music; Victor Entertainment
- Website: onitsuka-chihiro.jp

Chihiro Onitsuka (鬼束 ちひろ, Onitsuka Chihiro) (born October 30, 1980) is a Japanese singer-songwriter.

In 2000, Onitsuka released her debut single "Shine" and gained recognition when its follow-up "Gekkou" became a hit. Insomnia, her first studio album, released in the following year, topped the Japanese Oricon charts and has sold more than a million copies. She won the prize for lyrics of the 43rd Japan Record Awards in 2001 with "Memai", one of the singles from her debut album.

Onitsuka has suffered physical and mental illnesses, affecting her career. She put her recording career on hold until March 2007, after some confrontations with record labels and management during the mid-2000s.

By 2019 Onitsuka had released seven studio albums, twenty singles, five compilations, and several DVDs, selling at least 4.1 million units.

== Early life ==
Her parents encouraged Onitsuka to listen to Western music. By the time she was ten, she wrote her first poems, receiving praise from her parents, friends, and teachers, who called them 'earnest efforts'. However, she thought that just writing 'earnestly' wasn't enough, and from that time onward, she tried to write every day; by the time she was in junior high school, she began to gain more confidence.

Influence from Alanis Morissette in junior high school, and Jewel in high school strongly compelled Onitsuka to become a singer-songwriter. With some 70 original compositions and several other auditions under her belt, Onitsuka entered the 1998 Virgin Tokyo Artists Audition, going on to winning Grand Prize. Onitsuka then started her career as a professional and moved to Tokyo in spring 1999 after graduating from high school.

== Career ==
=== 2000–2001: "Gekkou" and Insomnia ===
Onitsuka's debut single "Shine" was released on February 9, 2000. Despite promotion, it failed commercially and did not enter any charts.

In August 2000, Onitsuka released "Gekkō" as the second single from her debut studio album, Insomnia. The song served as the theme song to the Japanese television series Trick, starring Yukie Nakama and Hiroshi Abe. The song debuted at number 30 on the Oricon Weekly Singles Chart and peaked at number 11. It has sold over 561,000 physical units and 500,000 digital units and remains Onitsuka's best-selling song. The double-A-side single, "Memai"/"Edge" was released as the fourth single from her debut album. It peaked at number six on the Oricon Weekly Singles chart and was certificated platinum by the Recording Industry Association of Japan (RIAJ). "Memai" later earned a Japan Record Awards for Best Lyrics at the 2001 ceremony.

Following of the success of the singles, Onitsuka's debut studio album Insomnia was released in March 2001 to commercial success, peaking at number one on the Oricon Weekly Albums chart and having sold over 1,300,000 copies. The album later earned a Rock Album of the Year at the Japan Gold Disc Award. In support of the album, Onitsuka embarked on her first concert tour "Chihiro Onitsuka Live Tour 2001" in April 2001. In the same month, she released her second video album, Me and My Devil, which includes a collection of Onitsuka's music videos.

While Insomnia remained in the charts, Onitsuka released the double-A-side single "Infection"/"Little Beat Life" as the lead single from her second album This Armor in September 2001. Four days after its release, the September 11 attacks occurred. As the lyrics of "Infection" can be interpreted as referring to the incident, EMI Music Japan cancelled further promotion to avoid causing controversy. The single was a commercial hit, peaking at number five on the Oricon Weekly Singles chart and selling over 170,000 copies. In November 2001, her live video album Cradle on My Noise Live: Live Insomnia Video Edition was released. It includes Onitsuka's performance in Shibuya, Tokyo during her Chihiro Onitsuka Live Tour 2001.

=== 2002–2003: This Armor and Sugar High ===
Onitsuka's second studio album This Armor was released in March 2002. The album was a commercial success, peaking at number three on the Oricon Weekly Albums chart and has since sold over 500,000 copies in Japan. The album was followed by the single "Ryūseigun", which served as the theme song to the second season of the Japanese television series Trick and peaked at number seven on the Oricon Weekly Singles chart.

Shortly after the album came out, Onitsuka embarked on her second concert tour "Live Vibe 2002". However, she was diagnosed with acute gastroenteritis from overworking and cancelled two shows in the tour. After the tour, she took hiatus for several months to recover physically. In November 2002, she made her comeback with the performance at the Nippon Budokan, the first show of her third concert tour "Chihiro Onitsuka Ultimate Crash '02".

Onitsuka's third studio album Sugar High was released in December 2002. The ballad-filled album met with a commercial success, peaking at number two on the Oricon Weekly Albums chart and having been certificated gold by RIAJ. The album includes "Castle Imitation", the theme song for the PlayStation 2 role-playing game, Breath of Fire: Dragon Quarter.

In January 2003, the documentary television program, Artist Document Kami ga Maioriru Shunkan: Chihiro Onitsuka 22 sai no Sugao was broadcast on NHK. Onitsuka released a single "Sign". To promote the single, she appeared several television variety shows, including "Mezamashi TV" and "Waratte Iitomo!". The single peaked at number four on the Oricon Weekly Singles chart, becoming Onitsuka's highest-charting song on the chart. Her follow-up single "Beautiful Fighter" was released in August 2003. It was commercially less successful than her previous singles, selling only 36,000 copies. However, it peaked at number nine on the Oricon Weekly Singles chart.

On September 10, 2003, Onitsuka announced she would take a hiatus until the end of the year to undergo a surgery to remove polyps and recover from her poor throat condition. Shortly before the announcement, she finished the recording of "Ii Hi Tabidachi, Nishi e", a cover of Momoe Yamaguchi. The song was released in October 2003 and sold 83,000 copies, making it her sixth best-selling song. The song served as the theme song to West Japan Railway Company's Discover West campaign. In November 2003, she released "Watashi to Waltz o", which served as the theme song to the third season of Trick, as well as her previous hits "Gekkō" and "Ryūseigun". The song became her last single under EMI Music Japan.

=== 2004–2006: "Sodatsu Zassō" and two-year hiatus ===
In March 2004, the box album titled Single Box was released without her approval. It managed to sell approximately 3,000 copies and entered on the Oricon Weekly Albums chart at number one hundred and six. Her fourth studio album was set to be released in the same year, but the album was cancelled and substituted by the release of the box album.

On June 18, 2004, she transferred to Sony Music Artists as a production label and A&M Records as a record label. In September 2004, she performed "King of Pain", "Smells Like Teen Spirit", and premiered her original song "Sodatsu Zassō" at Sweet Love Shower 2004. The performance gained great public attention as she appeared in hard rock style costume, breaking down her previous pure image. The song was released in October 2004 and peaked at number ten on the Oricon Weekly Singles chart. After the release, she announced that she would put her career on hiatus again. This hiatus lasted until March 2007, when she performed at AP Bang! Tokyo Creators Meeting. At one point she said that the reason of her departure from the music scene was because of mental fatigue caused by the series of new releases and tight schedules. However, in an interview printed in the October 19, 2007, issue of the Japanese popular music magazine Barfout, Onitsuka said that in 2004 she had attempted suicide by overdosing on medication. In addition, Onitsuka mentioned a polyp on her vocal cords around that time, as well as an eating disorder that saw her weight drop as low as 79 pounds (36 kilograms).

In December 2004, Onitsuka's first compilation album The Ultimate Collection was released simultaneously with the release of her sixth video album The Complete Clips via EMI Music Japan, her former record label. The two records were both released without her involvement; today, they are treated as unofficial albums. The compilation album was a commercial success, selling over 230,000 copies in Japan and having been certificated platinum by RIAJ. While it peaked at number three on the Oricon Weekly Albums chart, it entered G-Music East Asian Chart at number two.

On July 26, 2005, a man who kept ringing the doorbell of Onitsuka's house for thirty minutes with a bouquet in his hands was arrested for housebreaking. In September 2005, EMI Music Japan released Onitsuka's second compilation album Singles 2000–2003, which has sold 60,000 copies in Japan.

=== 2007–2010: Las Vegas and Dorothy ===
In April 2007, Onitsuka founded her individual production company Napoleon Records. In the following month, her comeback single "Everyhome" was released as the lead single from her fourth studio album Las Vegas. The album was released in October 2007 and reached number six on the Oricon Weekly Albums chart and number one on the G-Music East Asian Chart. The second single from the album, "Bokura Barairo no Hibi" peaked at number thirteen on the Oricon Weekly Singles chart.

On April 26, 2008, she held her first solo show since "Unplugged '03" in 2003, entitled "Chihiro Onitsuka Concert Nine Dirts and Snow White Flickers" at Bunkamura Orchard Hall, Shibuya. "Hotaru", the lead single from Onitsuka's fifth studio album, Dorothy, was released on August 6, 2008, and reached number eleven on the Oricon Weekly Singles chart. The song served as the theme song to the Japanese film Last Game Saigo no Soukei Sen (2008). On September 26, 2008, she announced the cancellation of the scheduled "Chihiro Onitsuka Concert Tour 2008 'Vegas Code'" due to her poor physical condition.

In September 2009, Onitsuka released her fifth studio album Dorothy. The album was preceded by four singles: "Hotaru", "X"/"Last Melody", "Kaerimichi o Nakushite", and "Kagerō", all of which entered within top 20 on the Oricon Weekly Singles chart. The album peaked at number ten in Japan, and number four on the G-Music East Asian chart.

In April 2010, the compilation album One of Pillars: Best of Chihiro Onitsuka 2000–2010 was released. Although the album is Onitsuka's third compilation release, it was the first compilation album which was released under her approval. The album was less of a commercial success than her previous albums, and only managed to peak at number thirteen on the Oricon Weekly Albums chart, selling approximately 16,000 copies.

On August 18, 2010, it was reported that Onitsuka was a victim of domestic violence by her then-boyfriend. On September 17, the suspect, Yūsuke Komiya, was arrested.

=== 2011–2015: Ken to Kaede and Good Bye Train: All Time Best 2000–2013 ===
In February 2011, Onitsuka transferred her record label to For Life Music and released her first single under the label, "Aoi Tori" in August 2011. In April 2011, Onitsuka's sixth studio album Ken to Kaede was released. The album reached number sixteen on the Oricon Weekly Albums chart and has sold 11,000 copies in Japan. To promote the album, Onitsuka embarked on the concert tour "Chihiro Onitsuka Concert Tour 2011: Hotel Murderess of Arizona Acoustic Show". In September 2011, Onitsuka served as a main personality on the web series Chihiro Onitsuka: Houchou no Ue de Utatanet. Her first cover album Famous Microphone was released in May 2012 and peaked at number thirty-four on the Oricon Weekly Albums chart.

On June 22, 2012, Onitsuka opened a Twitter account. She posted several violent tweets toward celebrities like Akiko Wada and Shinsuke Shimada. These tweets were promptly deleted, and the next day she offered an apology for her remarks.

In March 2013, Onitsuka embarked on the concert tour "Chihiro Onitsuka Tour Show 2013 Itazura Pierrot". She released the single "Itazura Pierrot" exclusively at the tour venues. In December 2013, Onitsuka released the double-A-side single "This Silence is Mine"/"Anata to Science". The former served as the theme song to the action role-playing video game Drakengard 3. On the same day of the release, her fourth compilation album Good Bye Train: All Time Best 2000–2013 was released. The album was a commercial failure, only managing to peak at number sixty-eight on the Oricon Albums chart.

In January 2014, Onitsuka embarked on the concert tour "Heart Beat Tour 2014", as the vocalist of the band Chihiro Onitsuka and Billy's Sandwiches. Her single "Inori ga Kotoba ni Kawaru Koro" was released in May 2014 and served as the theme song to the Japanese supernatural horror film Ju-On: The Beginning of the End. In September 2014, the debut album of Chihiro Onitsuka and Billy's Sandwiches Tricky Sisters Magic Burger was released. The follow-up single "Starlight Letter" was released in April 2015 with access exclusive for her fan club. She also wrote a song "Natsu no Tsumi" for Natsumi Hanaoka's debut single. The song helped her earn a Japan Record Awards nomination for Best New Artist.

=== 2016–present: Syndrome and upcoming eighth studio album ===
On January 28, 2016, Onitsuka's performance, entitled Chihiro Onitsuka "Tune Hour 2016", was broadcast live on Ustream, in the performance, she made a strong impression that she had recovered from her bad vocal condition. In April 2016, Onitsuka embarked on the concert tour Tigerlily.

In November 2016, Onitsuka released her first single under Victor Entertainment, "Good Bye My Love", as the lead single from her eighth studio album. Although the song only managed to peak at number thirty-five on the Oricon Weekly Singles chart, it became her best-selling single in the previous seven years since "Kagerō". Onitsuka's eighth studio album, Syndrome was released on February 1, 2017. The album sold better than her label expected and sold out in the several CD stores. Syndrome peaked at number fifteen on the Oricon Weekly Albums chart and spent nine weeks there, selling more than 11,000 copies. To promote the album, Onitsuka embarked on the concert tour of the same title as the album from April 2017 to July 2017. In June 2017, Onitsuka released her first live album Tiny Scream, which compiled from her performance at Breeze Tower, Osaka in June 2016, and Nakano Sun Plaza, Tokyo in November 2016. The album peaked at number twenty-two on the Oricon Weekly Albums chart and topped the Onkyo High-resolution audio chart. In August 2017, Onitsuka performed at one of the biggest music festivals in Japan, Rock in Japan Festival.

In June 2018, Onitsuka embarked on the concert tour "Under Babies". On July 27, 2018, Onitsuka announced that she had been married since 2015. "Hinagiku", the lead single from Onitsuka's ninth studio album, was released in August 2018. In December 2018, Onitsuka performed two concerts entitled Beekeeper, in Osaka and Tokyo.

== Artistry ==
In 2002, music critic Tetsu Misaki noted that Onitsuka was one of the few pop singers to sing about anger, citing lyrics such as isu o keritaoshi (椅子を蹴り倒し; "kick down the chairs") in "Shine" (2000) and fuhai shita sekai (腐敗した世界; "depraved world") in "Gekkō" (2000). He praised her "strong spirit" and writing without hesitation, but felt like her lyrics were not like standard poetry, as they dealt with unpolished things.

Misaki also noted that her lyrics were difficult to interpret, despite the fact that she does not use complicated words. He contrasted her lyrics to that of Ayumi Hamasaki who, in the early 2000s, wrote about an "easy to understand sadness," whereas it was not so clear what caused the sadness in Onitsuka's lyrics. Misaki further noted Onitsuka's use of body parts in her lyrics, especially legs, which is not common in Japanese popular music.

Misaki noted that Onitsuka's song titles had little to do with their lyrical content causing discord. He pointed out "Gekkō" as being moonless, "Memai" not to do with dizziness and "Rasen" which, instead of having a spiral theme to the lyrics, seemed to talk about moving forward. However, "Memai" can be interpreted as a psychological dizziness because of the instability of the narrator and her need to be emotionally sheltered. "Rasen" can be interpreted either as the end of a chapter in her life, which is often called a spiral, and the beginning of a new and better one; or as a suicide song, and the spiral of emotions that lead there, such as anger, doubt, not being able to forget a loved one.

== Domestic violence ==
On August 18, 2010, Onitsuka was assaulted by her boyfriend Yusuke Komiya in her apartment. Onitsuka and Komiya had been dating since September 2009 and the two shared an apartment together. Late at night on August 18, Komiya was out drinking and came home completely drunk. While Onitsuka was sleeping, Komiya punched her in the eyes. Onitsuka then tried to retaliate but was severely beaten resulting in several broken ribs. Onitsuka began her lawsuit against him on December 16, 2010.

== Discography ==
- Insomnia (2001)
- This Armor (2002)
- Sugar High (2002)
- Las Vegas (2007)
- Dorothy (2009)
- Ken to Kaede (2011)
- Syndrome (2017)
- Hysteria (2020)

== Bibliography ==
- 2011: Tsuki no Hahen (月の破片; "Fragments of the Moon") ISBN 4344-0197-76
