= Down the World: Mervil's Ambition =

1994 video game

- Cover art
- Developer: ASCII Corporation
- Publisher: ASCII Corporation
- Director: Hiromitsu Kawano
- Producer: Hirokazu Hamamura
- Programmers: Hiromitsu Kawano; Hisashi Suzuki
- Artist: Susumu Matsushita
- Writers: Chinfa Kan; Ichiro Sugiyama
- Composers: Jeff Pfeifer; Rob Pfeifer
- Platform: Super Famicom
- Release: JP: September 30, 1994
- Genre: Role-playing
- Mode: Single-player

Down the World: Mervil's Ambition is a role-playing video game (RPG) developed and published by ASCII Corporation for the Super Famicom. The plot follows the knight Gao, tasked with accompanying a hero (the player) in rescuing an ailing princess and preventing the end of all life.

Down the World contains traditional gameplay tropes from console RPGs such as exploration of dungeons, recruitment of new party members, and completion of quests to advance the plot. The game's turn-based battles with enemies are largely automatic, where the player chooses from a set of tactical formations containing roles for characters to act out.

Lyricist Chinfa Kan penned the story of Down the World as a film before it became an RPG. The game was once considered for the cancelled Super Famicom CD-ROM Adapter before development moved to the cartridge-based system. Down the World was directed by Hiromitsu Kawano, produced by Hirokazu Hamamura, and features character and monster designs by Susumu Matsushita. It was released exclusively in Japan on September 30, 1994.

== Plot ==
Down the World takes place in a fantasy realm consisting of an upper world and a diverse set of eight lower worlds, presided over by Princess Sara of the Land of Life. The story unfolds as Sara is pierced in her chest by a magic thorn, causing her to cry. If she should shed all her tears, all worlds will be destroyed. She uses some of her last remaining tears to turn ten warriors into Blue Tear Knights, who are to be led by her vassal King Mamran in search of a hero capable of removing the thorn. However, a malevolent sorcerer named Mervil desires Sara's death so that existence can be reset. He dispatches hordes of monsters upon the kingdom, which manage to slay nine of these warriors. The game's central character, the timid Gao, is left as the sole remaining Blue Tear Knight. With Sara having only three tears left, Mamran sends Gao and his fairy companion Berber through the Departure Mirror to travel down to the human world in search of the hero whom they quickly discover as the player of the game. After addressing the player then giving him or her full control of Gao, an adventure ensues to reach the princess in the Land of Life and save all of creation.

== Gameplay ==
Down the World is an RPG that shares many elements with other titles within the genre of its era. The field screen is presented in a top-down perspective and each overworld map has various points of interest. Towns can be visited for gathering information, purchasing items and equipment, or initiating quests. Dungeons can be explored to discover treasure and key items for advancing the story. The game features unique navigation options that allow the player to automatically move the player character Gao in a specific direction until he hits an obstacle, move him along walls, or revisit a previously discovered location. However, this last option is not a fast travel mechanic as the player must wait while Gao traverses the entire distance on foot and both traps and random encounters with enemies can still occur. As the game emphasizes the player is its true hero, Gao often breaks the fourth wall by directly presenting choices to the player.

Battles take place on isometric grids where the player chooses formations for player characters.

Battles with enemies and bosses in Down the World take place on an isometric grid where each player party member and opponent occupy a square on the grid. Player characters and enemies take turns in real time, moving and attacking one another to reduce the hit points of each opposing side's units to zero. Fights are mostly automated via the game's Active Formation Battle (AFB) system. Rather than allowing the player to manually issue commands to party members each, tactical formations are chosen that assign specific actions to party members such as melee attacking, casting magic spells, defending, or healing. AFB formations can be customized, saved, and renamed at the player's discretion. Should Gao fall in battle, he can be automatically revived up to six times will Berber's wings; these wings can be refilled using an item. At the end of battle, Each party member is rewarded with experience points which, when accrued, will increase their levels and subsequently improve their statistics like health, strength, and magic power.

== Development and release ==
Down the World was developed and published for the Super Famicom by Japanese media publisher ASCII Corporation, known for its gaming magazine Weekly Famitsu. Lyricist Chinfa Kan wrote the game's story. He grew up as a fan of fantasy novels, most notably J. R. R. Tolkien's The Lord of the Rings, which was enjoying a resurgence in popularity at the time. Kan claimed in a December 1993 interview with Famitsu that he drafted the story as a film about seven years prior and even sent the materials to American director Steven Spielberg for consideration. After receiving a response from Spielberg requesting more information, contact between them abruptly ceased. The story was eventually read by artist Susumu Matsushita, who had made name for himself doing mascot designs and cover illustrations for Famitsu. Matsushita said in the same interview that he suggested the plot would be perfect for an RPG and attached himself to the project as its art director and character designer, eventually contributing over 200 illustrations to it.

Matsushita recalled that ASCII began production of Down the World around three years prior but that it was slow-moving. At one point, development was planned for the Super Famicom CD-ROM Adapter before the add-on's cancellation and the game's move to the Super Famicom itself. The game was directed by Hiromitsu Kawano, produced by Famitsu's chief editor Hirokazu Hamamura, and programmed by Hiromitsu Kawano and Hisashi Suzuki. Kan received assistance writing the script from one of the game's designers, Ichiro Sugiyama. Kan wished to immerse players within the game's worlds by directly making them a part of narrative and having characters interact with them.

Hikaru Kanematsu was the game's sound producer while Los Angeles-based Jeff and Rob Pfeifer composed the music. The English language music theme played during the game's introduction has fully-voiced, digitized lyrics. This was a rarity for a cartridge-based game and Down the World was the first Super Famicom game to do so. The same technique would be used in Namco's 1995 RPG Tales of Phantasia, both accomplished with extensive use of pulse-code modulation (PCM) sources via the Super Famicom sound chip. The main theme of Down the World was originally set to be performed by singer-songwriter Masatoshi Ono, but it was ultimately performed by an uncredited female vocalist in the final release.

Down the World was originally scheduled for an April 1994 launch before being delayed until July of that same year. After another delay, the game was released exclusively in Japan on September 30, 1994; it was later made available on the Nintendo Power flash cartridge service on December 1, 1997. A 27-song soundtrack, Down the World Music Episode 1, was released by Polystar ahead of the game on September 24. Additional merchandise was released by Aspect including an encyclopedia, an official guidebook, a light novel adaptation, and a tabletop RPG version of the game.

== Reception ==
Reception

Review score
Publication	Score
Famitsu	8/10, 7/10, 7/10, 6/10

The readers of Family Computer Magazine scored the game a total of 21.2 out of 30. Game Criticism was complimentary of the story and stated that the concept of the user being integrated into the plot was comparable to Michael Ende's fantasy novel The Neverending Story, but also felt that the game's lack of challenge, particularly from its auto-revive mechanic, trivialized any emotional connection the player might have with the game's universe.
