= NeGcon =

Video game controller manufactured by Namco

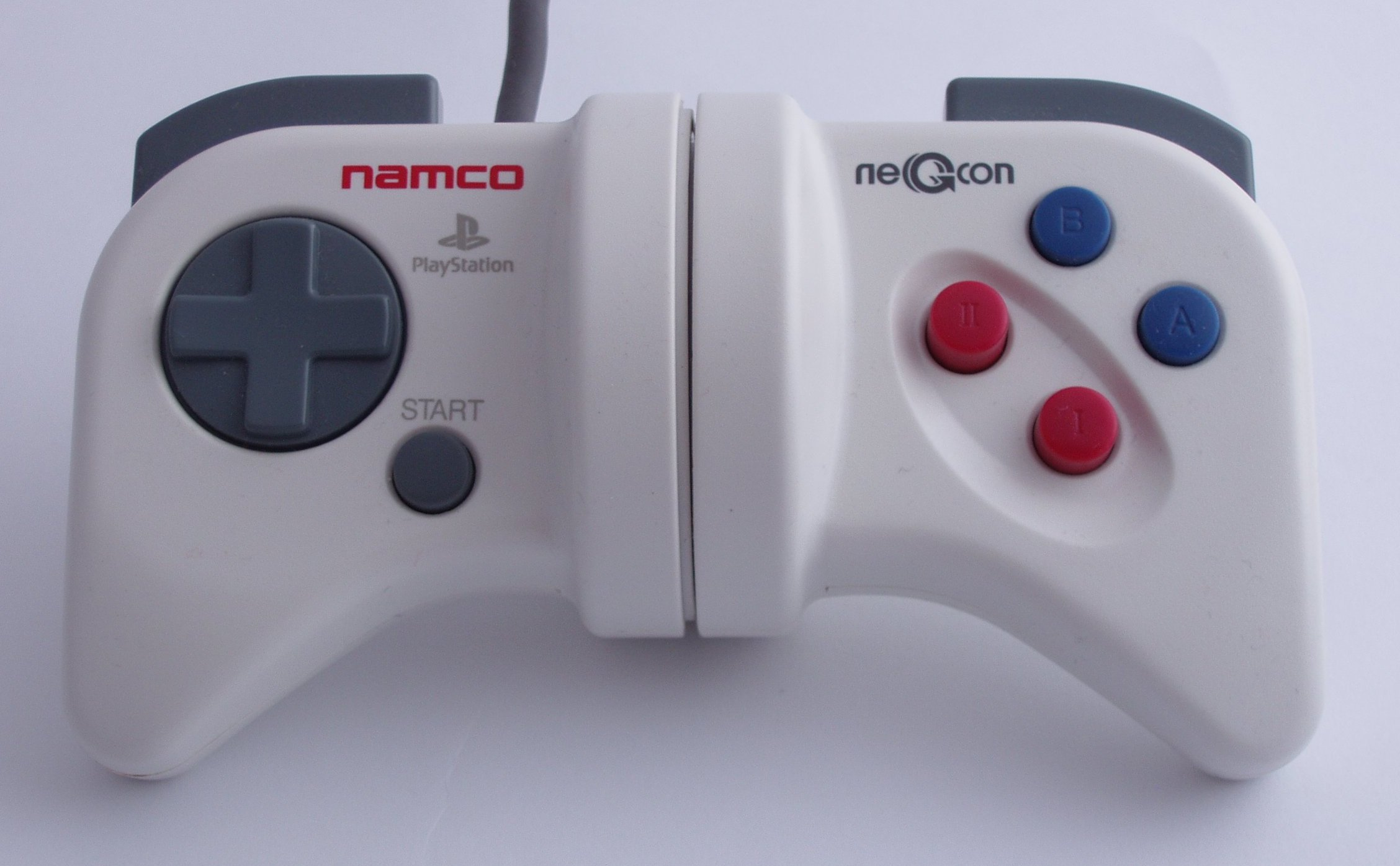
- Developer: Namco
- Manufacturer: Namco
- Type: Game controller
- Released: JP: January 1, 1995; NA: 1995
- Platform: PlayStation, PlayStation 2
- Related: JogCon; GunCon

The NeGcon (Note: Japanese: ネジコン, Hepburn: Nejikon), stylized as neGcon, is a motion-based game controller manufactured in 1995 by Namco for the PlayStation. One of the first third-party peripherals for the system, the controller is connected by a swivel joint, allowing the player to twist the halves relative to each other. The controller also replaces the "symbol" buttons on the original PlayStation controller with two "A" and "B" buttons, as well as "I" and "II" buttons that allowed for analogue control. A black variant was released exclusively in Japan.

The NeGcon was created to replicate the analog-stick movement used in the arcade game Cyber Sled (1993); the name comes from the Japanese word "nejiru", meaning "to twist". The controller was intended for use in racing games, including Ridge Racer, Gran Turismo and Wipeout. Critical reception for the NeGcon was highly positive, being praised for its responsive control in games and unique design.

== Description ==
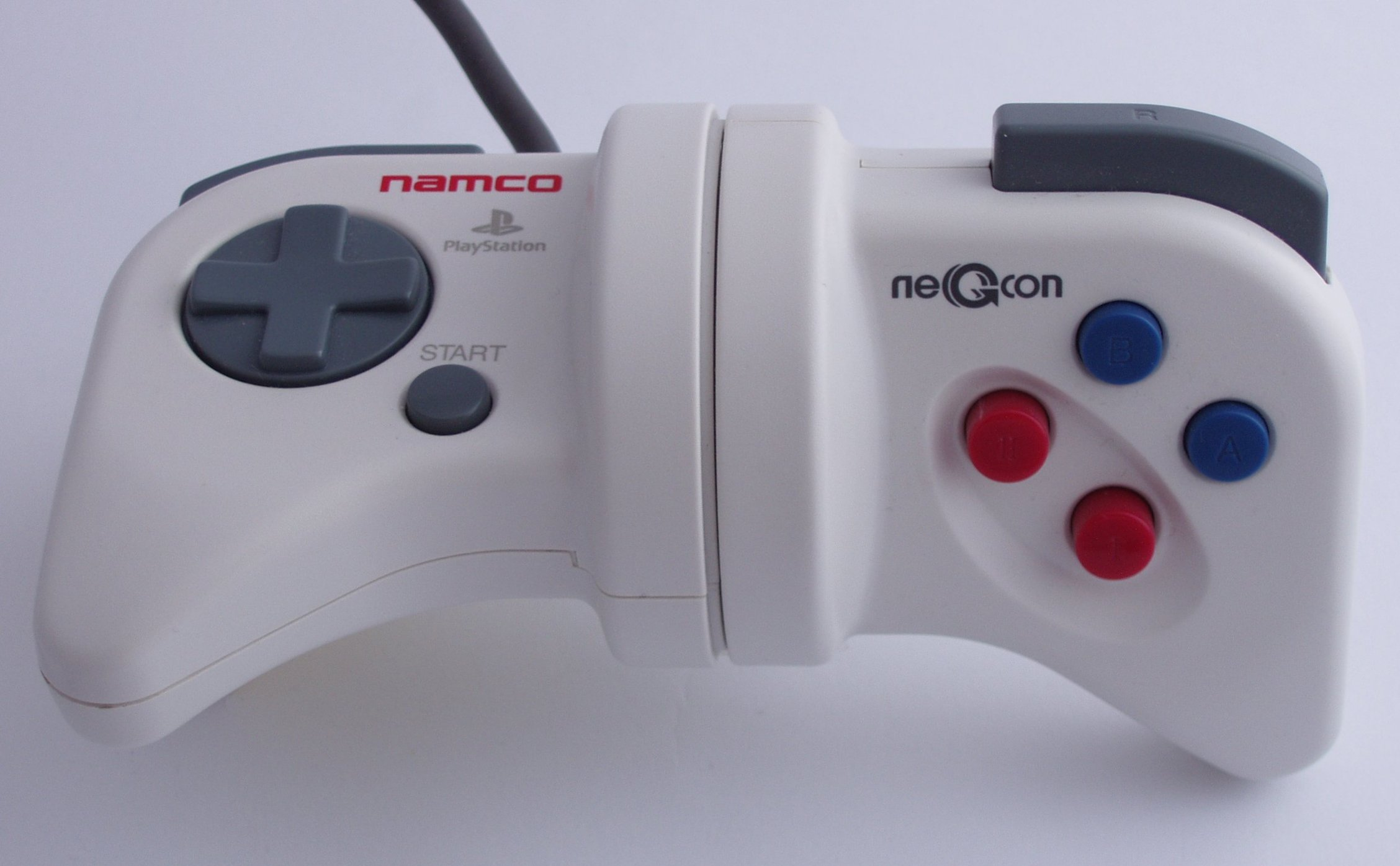
The NeGcon has a swivel joint that connects the two halves together, allowing them to be twisted relative to each other.

The NeGcon is a video game peripheral released for the PlayStation by Namco, and is also compatible with the PlayStation 2. It is inserted into the system through the controller port located on the front. The left of the controller features a D-pad and a start button, while the right features two blue "A" and "B" buttons and two red "I" and "II" buttons. Two shoulder buttons, labeled "L" and "R" respectively, are located at the top of the controller. The D-pad opts for a cross-shaped circular design similar to the one found on consoles such as the Sega Genesis or the TurboGrafx-16, as opposed to the directional button layout found on the original PlayStation controller.

The halves of the NeGcon are connected by a large swivel-joint, which allows the user to twist both halves relative of each other to allow for precise movements in games. This swivel-joint is operated by gears that turn the shafts of two potentiometers within the device, the central pivot utilizing a ring gear driving a pinion on the shaft of the potentiometer. The I and II buttons are both analogue and have approximately 7mm of travel, which can allow for sustained, responsive button presses. The buttons also detect how much the user pushes them. The L shoulder button is also analogue and has approximately 5mm of travel. All three analogue buttons have a rack driving pinions similar to the ones in the swivel-joint.

== Use ==
The neGcon's design was prompted by Namco's desire to accurately replicate the dual-lever controls of their arcade game Cyber Sled on the PlayStation.

Examples of racing games that took advantage of the neGcon are the original PlayStation iterations of the Ridge Racer series (Ridge Racer Type 4 also supported the Namco Jogcon), Gran Turismo, Motor Toon Grand Prix, Motor Toon Grand Prix 2, Destruction Derby, Colin McRae Rally, TOCA, Rally Cross, V-Rally and the Pole Position games on Namco Museum volumes 1 and 3, as well as Ridge Racer V on the PlayStation 2. The Wipeout series (including Wipeout Fusion on the PS2) also supported the neGcon. The number of non-racing games which supported the neGcon was limited, almost solely confined to Namco's Ace Combat series (which also carried over to PS2). Although the neGcon was not strictly protocol-compatible with the standard PS1 controller, Sony's libraries seemed to support the neGcon as a standard controller even at launch. Because of this, a neGcon could be used in most games that didn't require the use of R2, L2 or select buttons, including the system's built-in memory card manager and CD player. Additionally, the neGcon library was also used to provide finer controls for third-party steering wheels, with long throw I and II buttons used for pedals in such controllers. However, said long throw of the I and II buttons makes the neGcon not a top-quality substitute for a regular PS1 controller. In particular, games that required rapid button pressing of the square or X buttons were difficult to play well.

Gran Turismo 3: A-Spec and Gran Turismo 4 for the PS2 do not support the neGcon. This had the effect of breaking compatibility with steering wheel controllers that previously used the neGcon protocol, although other games such as Le Mans 24 Hours and World Rally Championship (with control mode set to digital) allowed for compatibility. GT3 and GT4 are compatible with the standard PS2 DualShock 2 which provides analog throttle and brake input. For finer control than the short-throw DualShock 2 buttons offered, a user could use a Logitech-produced wheel which was specifically produced for these games. The Logitech wheels were large and non-portable but were well matched to the Gran Turismo games.

== History ==
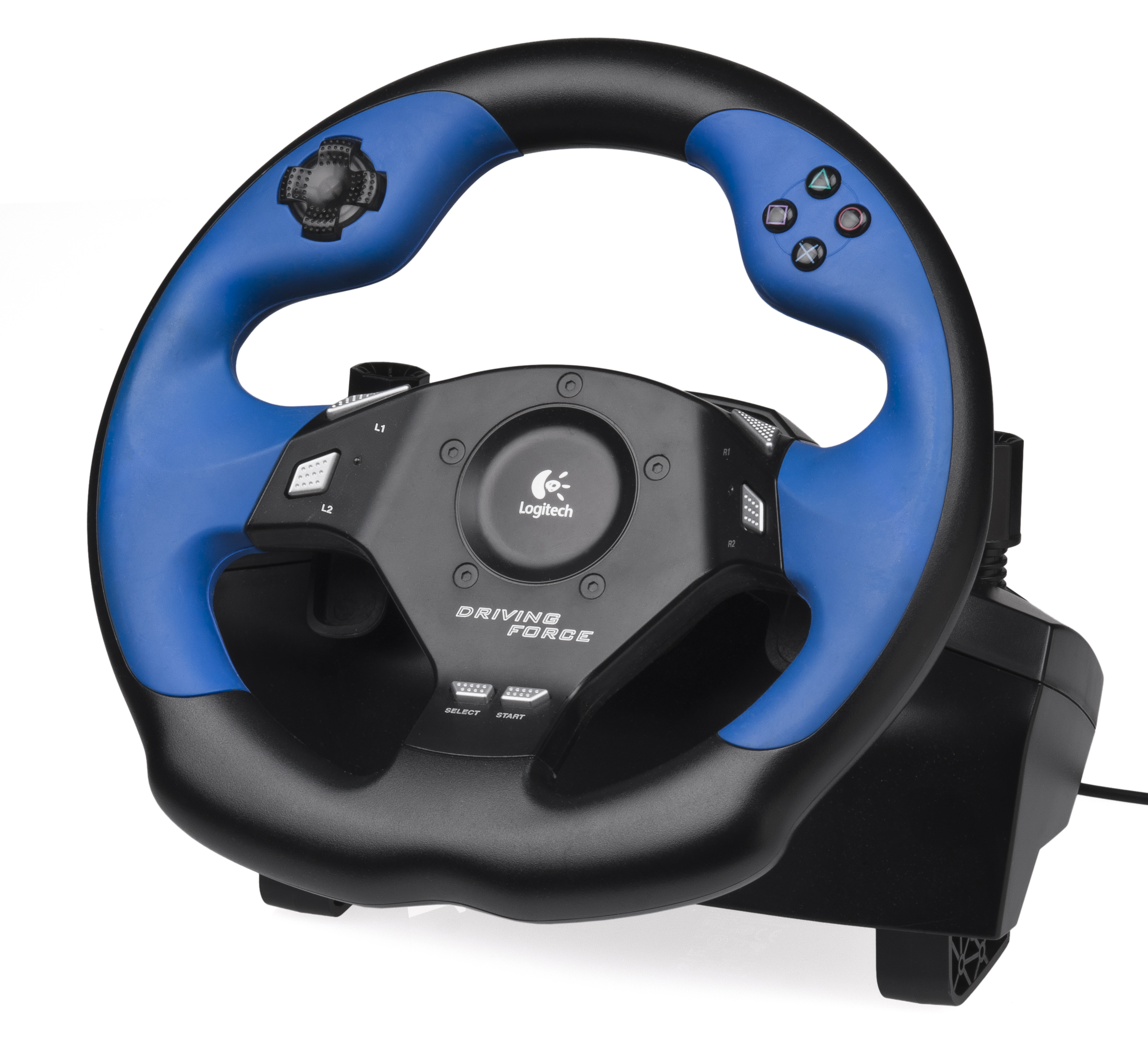
The NeGcon production team based its design on various steering wheel controllers.

The NeGcon was the creation of Namco designer Satoru Kuriyama. Best known as the production manager for Ridge Racer (1993), Kuriyama envisioned the idea for the NeGcon while observing a fellow Namco employee, Valkyrie no Densetsu creator "Ms. Okawa", playing a Super Famicom racing game while simultaneously tilting the controller in the direction the car was turning in the game. Kuriyama then began thinking of a controller that could twist and turn to perform movement in precise game movements. Namco's console game division caught wind of the idea and suggested that if the controller was drastically different from other game controllers already on the market, it could help create new, interesting game concepts. The team looked to racing games for inspiration, thinking of creating a controller akin to a steering wheel that allowed for quick, precise turns. The name NeGcon is based on the Japanese word "nejiru", meaning "to twist".

Yutaka Isokawa, a Namco engineer, was assigned to the NeGcon production team shortly after completing work on two Yu Yu Hakusho games for the Super Famicom. Originally a developer at Asmik that designed Catrap for the Game Boy, he was integrated into Namco's console game division to begin work on the new controller. Isokawa believes that part of the idea behind the NeGcon was based on Namco's desire to create hardware for the home console market, rather than be strictly a third-party publisher for companies such as Nintendo and Sony Computer Entertainment — this idea was further fueled by the fact that Namco's rival, Sega, was at the time one of the largest hardware manufacturers in the home video game market. Isokawa believes that the company intended to begin producing controllers and potentially consoles before the PlayStation was released.

While designing the NeGcon, the production team turned to racing games for inspiration; they specifically looked at steering wheels and how they moved to potentially create a controller that allowed for quick, responsive turns around corners in tracks. The controller itself was mainly designed by Kazumi Mizuno, the graphical planning manager in Namco's consumer game division. It was suggested by Isokawa and others that the controller could be twisted to recreate the feeling of a steering wheel, rather than having it be held at a specific angle. Multiple prototypes were proposed, including one with a longer controller prong at one hand and another with all four buttons being analogue. Many of the designers were nervous about the swivel that allowed the controller to be twisted as they thought it would be too fragile.

During production of the NeGcon, Isokawa began work on a video game that could show off the controller's capabilities. It was a golf game that had the player twist the NeGcon to simulate the action of swinging a golf club to hit the ball. Isokawa scrapped the game as Namco would have to compete with Sony's Everybody's Golf, which he felt was not possible due to the latter's widespread success. He also believed that golf players who tried out the game would dislike it for its controls and concept overall. Although the game itself was cancelled, the team used it to test the NeGcon prototype units as a way to help correct potential issues and finalize the design.

== Supported games ==
List of NeGcon-compatible video games
Year	Title	Platform	Publisher	Ref.
1994	Ridge Racer	PlayStation	Namco	
1994	Motor Toon Grand Prix	PlayStation	Sony Computer Entertainment	
1995	Ridge Racer Revolution	PlayStation	Namco	
1995	Cyber Sled	PlayStation	Namco	
1995	Air Combat	PlayStation	Namco	
1995	Wipeout	PlayStation	Psygnosis	
1995	Destruction Derby	PlayStation	Psygnosis	
1995	Namco Museum Vol. 1 (Note: The included port of Pole Position supports the NeGcon.)	PlayStation	Namco	
1996	J-League Soccer Prime Goal EX	PlayStation	Namco	
1996	Studio P	PlayStation	Argent	
1996	The Need for Speed	PlayStation	Electronic Arts	
1996	World Stadium EX	PlayStation	Namco	
1996	Wipeout 2097	PlayStation	Psygnosis	
1996	Rage Racer	PlayStation	Namco	
1996	Motor Toon Grand Prix 2	PlayStation	Sony Computer Entertainment	
1996	Galaxian3	PlayStation	Namco	
1996	Namco Museum Vol. 3 (Note: The included port of Pole Position II supports the NeGcon.)	PlayStation	Namco	
1996	Tempest X3	PlayStation	Interplay	
1996	Destruction Derby 2	PlayStation	Psygnosis	
1996	Road Rage/Speed King	PlayStation	Konami	
1996	Hardcore 4x4	PlayStation	ASC Games (NA), Gremlin Interactive (EU)	
1997	Rally Cross	PlayStation	Sony Computer Entertainment	
1997	Ace Combat 2	PlayStation	Namco	
1997	Formula Karts Special Edition	PlayStation	Telstar	
1997	Peak Performance	PlayStation	Atlus	
1997	Xevious 3D/G+	PlayStation	Namco	
1997	V-Rally	PlayStation	Infogrames Multimedia	
1997	Gran Turismo	PlayStation	Sony Computer Entertainment	
1997	Arkanoid Returns	PlayStation	Taito	
1997	Need for Speed II	PlayStation	Electronic Arts	
1997	Ray Tracers	PlayStation	Taito	
1997	TOCA Touring Car Championship	PlayStation	The 3DO Company	
1997	Rapid Racer	PlayStation	Sony Computer Entertainment	
1998	Arcade's Greatest Hits: The Atari Collection 2	PlayStation	Midway Games	
1998	Klonoa: Door to Phantomile	PlayStation	Namco	
1998	Auto Destruct	PlayStation	Electronic Arts	
1998	NASCAR 99	PlayStation	Electronic Arts	
1998	Puchi Carat	PlayStation	Taito	
1998	Rally de Africa	PlayStation	Prism Arts	
1998	R4: Ridge Racer Type 4	PlayStation	Namco	
1998	Twisted Metal III	PlayStation	Sony Computer Entertainment	
1998	Need for Speed III: Hot Pursuit	PlayStation	Electronic Arts	
1998	Colin McRae Rally	PlayStation	Codemasters	
1998	World Stadium 2	PlayStation	Namco	
1999	Ace Combat 3: Electrosphere	PlayStation	Namco	
1999	Crash Team Racing	PlayStation	Sony Computer Entertainment	
1999	Formula One 99	PlayStation	Sony Computer Entertainment	
1999	Gran Turismo 2	PlayStation	Sony Computer Entertainment	
1999	Need for Speed: High Stakes	PlayStation	Electronic Arts	
1999	V-Rally 2	PlayStation	Electronic Arts (NA), Infogrames Multimedia (EU)	
1999	Side by Side Special	PlayStation	Taito	
1999	Wipeout 3	PlayStation	Psygnosis	
2000	Formula One 2000	PlayStation	Sony Computer Entertainment	
2000	Mille Miglia	PlayStation	SCi_Games	
2000	NASCAR Rumble	PlayStation	Electronic Arts	
2000	Need for Speed: Porsche Unleashed	PlayStation	Electronic Arts	
2000	Colin McRae Rally 2.0	PlayStation	Codemasters	
2000	Rally de Europe	PlayStation	Prism Arts	
2000	RC Revenge	PlayStation	Acclaim Entertainment	
2000	Ridge Racer V	PlayStation 2	Namco	
2000	Touge Max G	PlayStation	Atlus	
2000	Dave Mirra Freestyle BMX	PlayStation	Acclaim Entertainment	
2000	Dave Mirra Freestyle BMX: Maximum Remix	PlayStation	Acclaim Entertainment	
2000	007 Racing	PlayStation	EA Games	
2001	Ford Racing	PlayStation	Empire Interactive	
2001	Formula One 2001	PlayStation	Sony Computer Entertainment	
2001	Battle Gear 2	PlayStation 2	Taito	
2002	Wipeout Fusion	PlayStation 2	Sony Computer Entertainment	
2005	NamCollection	PlayStation 2	Namco	

== Variants ==
NeGcon has been built in three variants.

- The First Generation model is a basic white neGcon with curved shoulder buttons. It was manufactured in South Korea.
- The Second Generation model has more rectangular shaped shoulder buttons and was manufactured in China. The Second Generation also uses different components inside.
- The Third Generation model is a black slightly smaller version of the neGcon. It was designed as a cheaper version of white neGcons, but it has never been officially sold outside of Japan. The black neGcon had reshaped handles designed to be more ergonomic. However it's built of cheaper plastic and components. It is mostly based on the second generation model, sharing most of its components. The black NeGcon was released on April 29, 1998, in Japan.

== Reception ==
According to Electronic Gaming Monthly, upon release in Japan the neGcon "received rave reviews from the gaming press because of its unusual design, shape and method of control".

Retrospective coverage of the NeGcon has been similarly positive, and has noted its outlandish, unique design. Time, who ranked it as the 4th strangest gadget of all time, stated that the NeGcon "stands apart as one of the few simultaneously bizarre and functionally intrepid" of video game controllers, commending its responsive button input and general suitability for racing games. GameSpot agreed, saying that the controller helped redefine the overall design of the traditional PlayStation controller. They said its design was strange and bizarre, yet responsive, and that it was an excellent controller for racing games like Ridge Racer. IGN expressed disappointment towards the NeGcon's poor sales due to it being seen as strange by the general public, writing that it "just goes to show where genuine innovation will get you."

== See also ==
- Jogcon
- GunCon
