= V-Rally 3 =

2002 video game

- European PlayStation 2 cover art
- Developer: Eden Studios (Note: Velez & Dubail developed the Game Boy Advance version.)
- Publisher: Infogrames Europe (Note: Released under the Atari brand. The European-exclusive PC version was published after the rebranding, as Atari Europe.)
- Series: V-Rally
- Platforms: PlayStation 2, Game Boy Advance, Xbox, GameCube, Windows
- Release: 21 June 2002: Game Boy Advance; PAL: 21 June 2002; NA: 17 October 2002 PlayStation 2; EU: 21 June 2002; AU: 28 June 2002; NA: 22 October 2002 Xbox; NA: 26 March 2003; EU: 28 March 2003; AU: 11 April 2003 GameCube; PAL: 27 June 2003 Microsoft Windows; EU: 14 November 2003
- Genre: Racing
- Modes: Single-player, multiplayer

V-Rally 3 is a racing video game developed by Eden Studios and published by Infogrames Europe. It is the sequel to V-Rally 2 (1999), and was released for the PlayStation 2 and Game Boy Advance platforms in 2002, and ported to the Xbox, GameCube, and Microsoft Windows in 2003. The game received favorable reviews, and was followed by V-Rally 4 in 2018.

== Gameplay ==
The game focuses on the unique career mode, where the player races against bots in various rallies across an endless number of seasons, ultimately trying to become the champion. Alternatively, the game offers a quick race mode, where the player can play time attacks on the stages provided by the game or compete in one of the five different challenges it offers.

The game features 24 tracks and 20 official vehicles from the 2000 to 2002 World Rally Championship and the 2001-2002 Super 1600 Junior World Rally Championship, including the Mitsubishi Lancer Evolution VII WRC 01', the Subaru Impreza WRC 01', Toyota Corolla WRC, and (the game's "flagship" car) 2000 Peugeot 206 WRC. There are four unlockable vehicles, which can be unlocked once the player has achieved a goal (like claiming the 2.0 L Championship).

== Development and release ==
V-Rally 3 was developed by Eden Studios for the PlayStation 2 console. For the game, developers built a new physics and 3D engine, which is capable of modeling vehicles in 15,000 polygons. The Game Boy Advance version was developed by VD-dev, the same team who developed the Game Boy and Game Boy Color versions of the original V-Rally game. The GBA version was originally planned to be developed at Infogrames Lyon House.

The game was first released for PlayStation 2 in 2002 in Europe on 21 June, in Australia on 28 June, and on 22 October in North America. The Game Boy Advance version also first released on 21 June 2002 in both Europe and Australia, and in North America on 17 October 2002. The game was released for Xbox in 2003 in North America on 26 March, Europe on 28 March, and Australia on 11 April. A port for GameCube was released in Europe and Australia on 27 June 2003. A North American release was planned for the console before being cancelled. Finally, a port for Windows was released exclusively in Europe on 14 November 2003.

== Reception ==
Reception

Aggregate score
Aggregator	Score
Metacritic	82/100 (PS2, GBA); 76/100 (Xbox)

Review scores
Publication	Score
Eurogamer	5/10 (PS2); 8/10 (GBA)
GameSpot	7.2/10
GameSpy	75/100
IGN	8.8/10 (PS2); 8/10 (GBA, Xbox)
Jeuxvideo.com	16/20

V-Rally 3 received generally favorable review from video game publications. GameSpot criticized the game's overly sensitive and poor controls, but nevertheless highlighted its "deep" career mode due to its realistic damage-modeling system and ranking system, which is based on staff morale, car reliability, season performance, and budget.

V-Rally 3 was a runner-up for GameSpot's annual "Best Driving Game on Game Boy Advance" award, which went to Driver 2 Advance.
