= Road Rage (1995 video game) =

1997 video game

- Japanese PlayStation box art
- Developer: Konami
- Publisher: Konami
- Composers: Mutsuhiko Izumi, Akira Yamaoka, Yuji Takenouchi
- Platforms: Arcade; PlayStation
- Release: Arcade: WW: May 1995; PlayStation: JP: 13 December 1996; EU: 8 January 1997
- Genre: Racing
- Mode: Single-player

Road Rage (known as Speed King NEO KOBE 2045 in Japan) is a 1995 cyberpunk-themed racing video game developed by Konami and originally released for arcades. It was ported to the PlayStation in 1996 in Japan followed by 1997 in Europe.

The game contains references to a large number of other Konami games (Gradius, Parodius, Metal Gear, Snatcher, Frogger, etc.). The races themselves take place in the city of Neo Kobe (known from Konami's Snatcher), inspired by the movie Blade Runner. The gameplay is similar to the better-known futuristic racing series Wipeout. In order to approximate the authentic gameplay of the original arcade version, the PlayStation port features support for the NeGcon analog controller.

The European PlayStation version of the game is considered obscure and very rare the same can be said for the arcade cabinets due to their elusive status.

== Reception ==
Famitsu scored the PlayStation port 21 out of 40, with criticism given to the "floatiness" and sense of speed.

== See also ==
- Road Fighter
