= V-Rally =

Racing video game series

- Original logo
- Genre: Racing
- Developers: Infogrames Multimedia (1997–1998); Eden Studios (1999–2003); Kylotonn (2018–present)
- Publishers: Infogrames (1997–2003); Electronic Arts (1997–1999) (Note: PlayStation North American release of the first two titles.); Nacon (2018–present)
- Platforms: PlayStation, Game Boy, Nintendo 64, Game Boy Color, Microsoft Windows, Dreamcast, PlayStation 2, Xbox, GameCube, PlayStation 4, Xbox One, Nintendo Switch
- First release: V-Rally; July 1997
- Latest release: V-Rally 4; 7 September 2018

V-Rally is a racing video game series originally developed and published by Infogrames. It debuted in 1997 with the release of the eponymous game for the PlayStation console.

== History ==
V-Rally is a racing video game series created by the French interactive entertainment company Infogrames. It debuted in 1997 with the release of the eponymous game for the PlayStation console, which was critically and commercially successful in Europe. Eden Studios, a company that evolved from the Infogrames team that developed the original game, would subsequently develop the sequels V-Rally 2 in 1999 and V-Rally 3 in 2002. As of December 2001, the V-Rally series had sold four million units worldwide according to IGN. Conversely, The Guardian reported that it had sold almost 5 million units by October 1999. In 2017, the series' 20th anniversary was celebrated, with Eden showing an image gallery of its favourite rally cars. A fourth game, V-Rally 4, was developed by Kylotonn and published by Bigben Interactive in 2018. The game was directed by Alain Jarniou, who had previously worked on the PlayStation 2 version of V-Rally 3 as a second programmer.

== Games ==
- V-Rally (1997)
- V-Rally 2 (1999)
- V-Rally 3 (2002)
- V-Rally 4 (2018)
