= V-Rally 2 =

1999 video game

- Peugeot 206 WRC
- Developer: Eden Studios
- Publishers: PlayStation: EU: Infogrames; NA: Electronic Arts; Dreamcast, Windows; Infogrames
- Series: V-Rally
- Platforms: PlayStation, Dreamcast, Windows
- Release: PlayStation: UK: June 25, 1999; FR: June 29, 1999; NA: November 17, 1999; Dreamcast: EU: May 26, 2000; NA: October 18, 2000; Windows: EU: September 22, 2000; NA: September 27, 2000
- Genre: Racing
- Modes: Single-player, multiplayer

V-Rally 2 (titled Need for Speed V-Rally 2 in North America for the PlayStation version and Test Drive V-Rally in North America for the Dreamcast version) is a 1999 racing video game developed by Eden Studios and published by Infogrames for the PlayStation, Dreamcast and Microsoft Windows. It is the sequel to V-Rally (1997). The game received favorable reviews, and was followed by V-Rally 3 in 2002.

== Gameplay ==
The game features rally cars that competed in the 1999 World Rally Championship season. There are 26 cars in Championship Edition and 27 in Expert Edition. There are over 80 original tracks which represent all of the rallies of the 1999 season, excluding Greece and Safari. The game modes include a time trial mode, an arcade mode which follows the traditional style of arcade games, V-Rally Trophy where the player competes against 3 AI opponents to see who can get the least time in all of the rallies. The championship mode follows the actual example of rallying with different stages in the rallies featured in the game. V-Rally Trophy and Championship Mode feature 3 distinct championships: European, World and Expert.

Weather conditions like snow, rain, and rallying in daytime, sunset and night are included.

The racing tracks are essentially stored as curved lines in 3D space. Instead of designing and storing the entire track environment as a 3D model, the game engine generates each track segment based on the 3D line and several parameters, such as track theme, weather, incline/decline, degree of curvature etc.

There is also a track editor where the player can design their own rally tracks. There is Multiplayer mode which supports up to 4 Players. The PlayStation version of the game features support for DualShock analog controllers and Namco's neGcon and Jogcon racing controllers.

== Development ==
Interviewed by Official Dreamcast Magazine producer Oliver Raffard said that the development team were inspired by "GP1 for the sensation [of driving], the realism and the choice of tunings; Out Run for the fun and arcade spirit; and Rally Masters for the handling". The game was originally planned for release as a Nintendo 64 title, but was cancelled during the early development phases of the game and was never officially announced.

For the Dreamcast version, Infogrames consulted former World Rally Champion Ari Vatanen, who provided feedback and expertise based on his motorsport experience. According to Infogrames representative Franck Giraudin, the collaboration with Vatanen had begun in 1996.

== Reception ==
Reception

Aggregate scores
Aggregator	Score		
Aggregator	Dreamcast	PC	PS
GameRankings	82%	75%	81%
Metacritic	86/100	N/A	N/A

Review scores
Publication	Score		
Publication	Dreamcast	PC	PS
AllGame	N/A	N/A	3.5/5
CNET Gamecenter	8/10	N/A	9/10
Electronic Gaming Monthly	8.33/10 (Note: Three critics of Electronic Gaming Monthly gave the Dreamcast version each a score of 8.5/10, 9/10, and 7.5/10.)	N/A	8.25/10 (Note: Two critics of Electronic Gaming Monthly gave the PlayStation version each a score of 8/10, and two others each gave it each 8.5/10.)
Famitsu	N/A	N/A	27/40
Game Informer	1/10	N/A	7.25/10
GameFan	87% (Note: Three critics of GameFan gave the Dreamcast version each a score of 91, 87, and 83.)	N/A	N/A
GameRevolution	N/A	N/A	B+
GameSpot	8.9/10	N/A	7.9/10
GameSpy	6.5/10	N/A	N/A
IGN	9/10	N/A	8.5/10
Next Generation	4/5	N/A	3/5
Official U.S. PlayStation Magazine	N/A	N/A	3.5/5
PC Gamer (UK)	N/A	80%	N/A
PC Zone	N/A	62%	N/A

The Dreamcast version received "favorable" reviews according to the review aggregation website Metacritic. In Japan, where the PlayStation version was ported for release under the name V-Rally Champion Edition 2 (Note: V-Rally Champion Edition 2 (V-ラリー チャンピオンエディション2, V-Rarī Chanpion Edishon Tsu)) and published by Spike on January 27, 2000, Famitsu gave it a score of 27 out of 40.

Max Everingham of NextGen said of the latter console version in its January 2000 issue, "It looks good, it plays fine, and it has a lot of tracks. Only a few annoying quirks keep it from really flying." Ten issues later, however, Jim Preston called the former console version "A colorful, fun, and realistic driving sim."

Edge gave the PlayStation version eight out of ten, saying that it was "Not perfect [...] but certainly closer than most other PlayStation driving games are likely to get." GamePro said that the same console version "walks a fine line of bridging a rally racing sim with arcade fun. The game has some tweaking options available, but mostly it's just about learning the ropes and driving, driving, driving. Easily the top of the class in rally racing games for the home console and not likely to be topped (except maybe graphically by Sega Rally 2 for the Dreamcast)." (Note: GamePro gave the PlayStation version three 4/5 scores for graphics, control, and fun factor, and 3.5/5 for sound.)
