= Susumu Matsushita =

Japanese manga artist

Susumu Matsushita (松下進 Matsushita Susumu; born February 6, 1950, in Fussa, Tokyo) is a Japanese manga artist known for his unique American comic–influenced design. His most famous works are the designing of the mascots Neppie (Note: Japanese: ネッピー) and Ripsea (Note: Japanese: リプシー) of the Orix Buffaloes, the concept art for the Monkey Magic television series, and video game artwork for Hudson's Adventure Island series (1986), Motor Toon Grand Prix (1994), and Maximo: Ghosts to Glory (2001).

== Early years ==
Born on February 6, 1950, Susumu Matsushita developed an aptitude for artistic design at a young age. He was influenced by animated Disney films featuring animal designs and by the American comics that were enjoyed by Matsushita's American uncle. He attended a specialized school and was educated in industrial design and later music where he gained a lasting appreciation for The Beatles. During this period, Matsushita attended an exhibition by Alan Aldridge in Ikebukuro's Seibu Department Stores. Fascinated by Aldridge's original illustrations for The Beatles Illustrated Lyrics, the exhibition made a strong impression on Matsushita and he determined to learn how to use the airbrush. Within a few months of experimentation he completely shifted to graphic design and the airbrush became his primary tool.

== Career ==
Matsushita began working as a freelance graphic designer in 1973. He had difficulties marketing himself initially, however his career gained momentum after securing a 1976 deal with Magazine House to produce magazine covers for the fashion magazine, Popeye. This was soon followed by a contract with Shueisha in 1979 to creating artwork for Young Jump. Matsushita's development of Young Jump's mascot, Mac Bear (later Buddy Bear), was to provide a significant moment in his career as he would shift increasingly toward the development of characters and mascots.

Creating his own studio company in 1986, Matsushita immediately signed a contract with ASCII to produce covers for the video game magazine, Famicom Tsūshin (subsequently shortened to Famitsū). With professional connections to the Jump magazine line and to Famitsū, requests were made for the development of numerous mascots for magazine split-offs and for video game character designs. These in turn became business propositions for Matsushita to develop mascots for musical bands, sports leagues, and even commercial and industrial organizations.

=== Mascots and characters ===
Matsushita's illustrations have frequently appeared in video game magazines including the creation of numerous covers for publications such as the Jump magazine line and Famitsu (for which Matsushita has designed the mascot, Necky the Fox (Note: Japanese: ネッキー・ザ・フォックス)). Matsushita also designed Baby Necky (Note: Japanese: ベビー・ネッキー) for younger readers and is responsible for creating the mascots of numerous Famitsu spinoff magazines including:

- Famitsu Bros. (for which Matsushita designed the mascot, Arnold Armadillo (Note: Japanese: アーノルド・アルマジロ))
- Satellaview Tsūshin (for which Matsushita designed Savi the Flying Squirrel (Note: Japanese: サビー・ザ・フライング スクウィラル))
- Famitsu PS (for which Matsushita created the Penguin Bros. (Note: Japanese: ペンギン・ブラザース))
- Game Boy Tsushin (for which Matsushita created the Buggy the Bat (Note: Japanese: バギー・ザ・バット))

He also drew the old Shueisha Business Jump magazine's mascot, which was a mouse.

Matsushita has also designed mascots and characters for video games and collectible card games including:

- Adventure Island (1986)
- The Derby Stallion series (1991)
- "Elfaria" (エルファリア) (1993)
- Down the World: Mervil's Ambition (1994)
- Motor Toon Grand Prix (1994)
- Maximo: Ghosts to Glory (2001) and its sequel Maximo vs. Army of Zin (2003)
- The Magical Ninja: Jiraiya Kenzan! (2004, cancelled)
- "Necky & Vina" (ネッキー&ヴィーナ) (2012, limited release for Famitsu GREE's Aquarian Age)
- "Maximum the Hormone" – A limited 2017 T-Card from Tsutaya (Culture Convenience Club)
- Tiny Barbarian (2017, Nicalis)
- Death end re;Quest (2018, final boss)

In addition to creating characters for games and game magazines, Matsushita has also designed mascots for numerous sports organizations like the mascots for the 1994 Asian Games which were being hosted in Hiroshima at the time, Poppo (Note: Japanese: ポッポ) and Cuccu (Note: Japanese: クック). Matsushita designed the Gamba Osaka's Gamba Boy (Note: Japanese: ガンバボーイ) as well as the former Orix Buffaloes' mascots Neppie (Note: Japanese: ネッピー) and Ripsea (Note: Japanese: リプシー).

Matsushita's designs, mascots, and characters have also appeared in the Kitakyushu-based theme park Space World (Matsushita designed Lucky Rabbit and friends), Minato's All of Me Club, and as concept art for the Monkey Magic television series.

=== Exhibitions ===
Matsushita has exhibited his works on a number of occasions throughout his career. Career highlights include:

- Susumu Matsushita 30th Anniversary Show (松下進 イラストレーション展) (2003, Sony Building, Ginza, Tokyo)
- Susumu Matsushita Art Works Exhibition (松下進ArtWorks展 ～2013年 画業40周年をむかえる松下進の世界～) (2013, Gallery EpiCute, Chiyoda, Tokyo)
- Old & New Susumu Matsushita Solo Exhibition (「OLD&NEW 松下進個展」) (2019, Bunkamura in Shibuya, Tokyo's Dōgenzaka district)

== Personal life ==
Matsushita is married to American-Japanese jazz singer Naomi Grace, for whom he acts as producer. Matsushita also performs with the band Honda Fujio & His GANG (本田富士旺&His GANG).
