= Kya: Dark Lineage =

2003 video game

- Developer: Eden Games
- Publisher: Atari
- Director: David Nadal
- Producer: Nour Polloni
- Designer: Hervé Sliwa
- Programmer: Jean-Yves Geffroy
- Artist: Gilles Benois
- Composers: Manuel Lauvernier; Thomas Colin
- Platform: PlayStation 2
- Release: NA: November 18, 2003; FR: November 21, 2003; AU: December 19, 2003; EU: April 2, 2004
- Genres: Action-adventure, platform
- Mode: Single-player

Kya: Dark Lineage is a third-person platforming action-adventure game for the PlayStation 2, developed by Eden Games and published by Atari.

Though initially set in the present, Kya: Dark Lineage throws the title character and her half-brother Frank into a strange new world. Kya finds herself separated from her brother, with the burden of protecting a friendly tribe of creatures called the Nativs from the predations of the evil overlord Brazul and his minions, the Wolfen.

== Plot ==
The titular character, Kya

Kya: Dark Lineage begins with the protagonist Kya and her half-brother Frank home alone. In her upstairs bedroom, Kya hears a suspicious noise and follows it downstairs to find Frank in a previously unknown room in the basement. While speaking about Kya's father, Frank unwittingly finishes a mysterious puzzle on a table, opening a portal which sucks in both Kya and Frank. Kya awakens with three Nativs (animal-like creatures) looking down on her. They are then ambushed and chased through a jungle by feral werewolves called the Wolfen/Wolfun. All but one of the Nativs were captured during the chase. Kya and Aton eventually reach a strange village, called Nativ City, and meets the village leader Atea.

Atea explains that the Wolfen/Wolfun are merely Nativs mutated by Brazul (formerly Alan), Kya's father. Kya resolves to save Frank and is introduced to Akasa, who teaches her how to fight using mystical bracelets which greatly enhance her strength. Kya is blessed with a power which allows her to exorcize unconscious Wolfen/Wolfun and transform them back into Nativs.

In return for freeing the excorcized Nativs, Atea agrees to help Kya find her half-brother. Kya learns she must find a magical medallion which will allow her to return to her own universe. The medallion was split into seven runes, emblems made of pure energy, which must be housed in a special amulet. During the course of tracking down the runes, Aton leads Kya to an industrialized area dedicated to mining magical amber. Aton betrays Kya, allowing Brazul to ambush her. During the course of the fight Kya collapses part of the mine to escape.

Eventually she discovers that Frank is being held in Brazul's laboratory, and she assaults the complex to rescue him. Upon arriving in the lab proper, she is horrified to learn that Brazul has turned Frank into a Wolfen/Wolfun. Kya defeats the Wolfen/Wolfun Frank and performs the exorcism ritual which returns him to his human form. Kya goes on to gather the last runes required to return home though she is ambushed again by Brazul, who takes the seven runes from her. Kya learns that she is a half alien and she escapes her imprisonment.

Kya journeys to Brazul's fortress, she fights and knocks out Aton who is now a Wolfen/Wolfun but when she gets the chance to exorcise him she doesn't because of falling, heavy crystals. Kya then heads for Brazul and the runes. After a difficult battle, Kya defeats Brazul and returns victorious to a cheering Nativ City, where she activates the portal and finds herself in a desolate place which is not her home. Kya and Frank are in a desert island and are attacked by a creature.

The story ends here, but if all the wolfens are all exorcised it cuts to the credits.

== Gameplay ==
Artwork of the Kya: Dark Lineage world.

Kya: Dark Lineage focuses on action-adventure platforming gameplay, with the player guiding Kya through a variety of stages. During the game the player can earn "nooties", allowing them to return to the Nativ city to purchase items required to progress through the game. The player can purchase several items which allow Kya to increase her mobility, including the ability to climb slippery surfaces, perform wall jumps or ride fast-moving lizards called Jamguts. Whenever the player suffers damage, Kya can recover energy by draining it from big amber shards.

The game focuses strongly on the element of air, featuring various sequences in which Kya must use strong wind currents to her advantage (although these can also prove to be a disturbance in certain points). It also features several freefall sequences during which the player must control Kya's speed and the direction of her descent, which usually ends when Kya lands on a big flower called Amortos, serving as an air bag. The player will suffer damage by touching objects while freefalling, or instantly lose a life by landing on the ground (at which point the freefall sequence will be restarted).

Complementing the player's mobility is Kya's "Boomy", a magical boomerang-like weapon which allows Kya to cut ropes and attack enemies. The Boomy can be upgraded twice in the Nativ city, first allowing the player to aim it in a first-person perspective (Silver Boomy) and later (Golden Boomy), which allows the player to activate switches or attack normally unreachable foes. The player can also purchase explosive or electrifying bombs to damage foes. Additionally, there are purchasable traps that can be used to capture rare monsters for the Nativ zoo.

Puzzles, which often rely on items or creatures within the immediate environment to solve, are another part of the game. Other puzzles might require creative use of Kya's mobility or use of her fully upgraded Boomy's ability to be directed as the player wishes. Some may only be solved when the player has acquired the correct equipment for Kya from Nativ City.

Beyond the beginning portion of the game the player's advancement is based on three factors: The equipment they have purchased, the number of Wolfen/Wolfun Kya has turned back into Nativs and ultimately, the collection of all seven Runes. A total of 260 Nativs can be rescued throughout the course of the game, though the player is not required to rescue them all in order to confront Brazul and complete the game.

A hand-to-hand combat system which is very similar to modern brawlers is included, during which Kya is unable to use her ranged weapons and must instead engage her foes in melee with punches, kicks and throws. The player will engage in this form of combat whenever a Wolfen/Wolfun is near. Players start with only a few simple moves Kya learns from Akasa, though players can acquire more powerful bracelets in Nativ shops which increase the strength of Kya's attacks and allow her to use a greater variety of combat moves, such as grabbing Wolfen/Wolfun by their tails and spinning them around, or even riding on top of them to ram against others. Whenever a Wolfen/Wolfun is knocked unconscious, the player can exorcize it back into its original Nativ form, assuming Kya has enough Mana spheres.

Further adding to the diversity of the game are Magic Boards which allow Kya to rapidly descend across rocky or otherwise treacherous terrain. These sequences greatly resemble snowboarding games, though Kya initially is forced to simply slide down slippery areas on her feet. Later sequences require players to initially purchase and then upgrade Kya's Magic Board so that she can gain the ability to jump or rapidly increase her speed.

== Release ==
Kya: Dark Lineage was released exclusively for PlayStation 2 in North America on November 18, 2003, In France on November 21, 2003, in Australia on December 19, 2003, and in PAL territories the following year on April 2, 2004.

== Reception ==
Reception

Aggregate scores
Aggregator	Score
GameRankings	72.98%
Metacritic	69/100

Review scores
Publication	Score
Edge	5/10
Electronic Gaming Monthly	5.83/10
Eurogamer	5/10
Game Informer	7.5/10
GamePro	2/5
GameSpot	8.2/10
GameSpy	3/5
GameZone	7.8/10
IGN	7.5/10
Official U.S. PlayStation Magazine	2.5/5
The Times	4/5

Kya: Dark Lineage received mixed reviews. GameRankings gave it a score of 72.98% and Metacritic gave it 69 out of 100. While well received by some (including GameSpot and PSM) it was critically panned by several major publications, including Electronic Gaming Monthly and Official U.S. PlayStation Magazine.

Common complaints include the game's spotty camera and imprecise controls, while other reviews cited the game's poor script and entry into an oversaturated market as reasons for disliking the game.

== Legacy ==
Katara from "Avatar: The Last Airbender" was originally named 'Kya' in the un-aired pilot episode. However, due to this game, Nickelodeon's legal department vetoed the name and it had to be changed. In spite of this 'Kya' was later used for Katara's then-unnamed deceased mother, as well as her future daughter as shown in "The Legend of Korra".
