= Jogcon =

Video game controller for the PlayStation

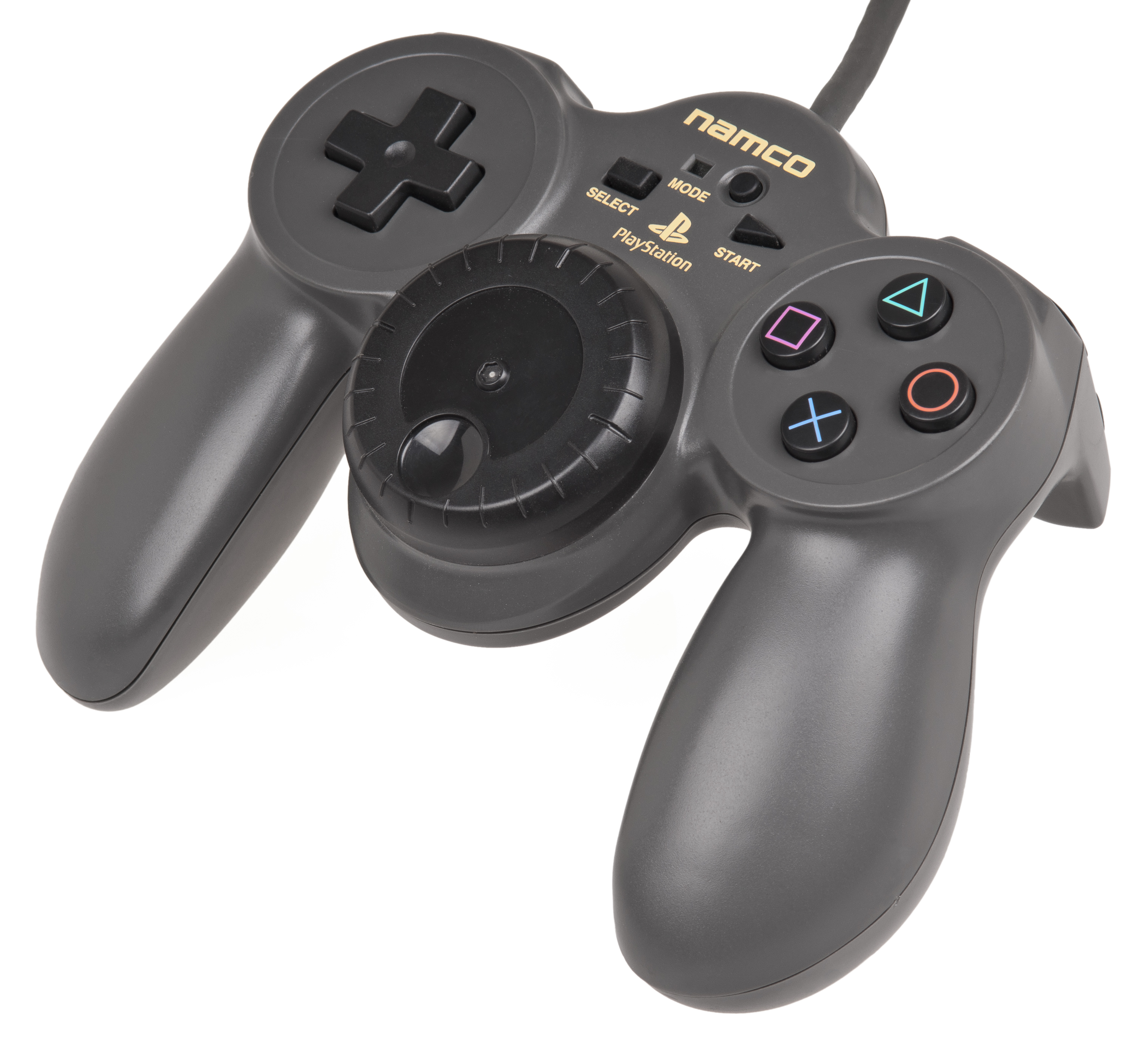
- Developer: Namco
- Manufacturer: Namco
- Type: Video game controller
- Released: JP: December 3, 1998; NA: 1998
- Platform: PlayStation, PlayStation 2
- Related: NeGcon; GunCon

The Jogcon (Note: Japanese: ジョグコン, Hepburn: Jogukon) is a game controller developed and produced by Namco for the PlayStation.

Originally released in 1998 as part of a special edition package with R4: Ridge Racer Type 4, it was designed to combine the function of a steering wheel controller, while maintaining the size of a standard PlayStation controller. This is accomplished by a dial approximately 3 inches in diameter in the center of the controller (almost in the same location as the DualShock analog sticks).

The dial was the first force feedback steering wheel available on the PlayStation. Its name comes from the fact that it is a game controller which incorporates a jog wheel of the kind often used for audio or video control. Actions such as torque steer, collisions, and feedback from turning the automobile all can be felt through the dial as the player manipulates it to maneuver their vehicle through the course.

The Jogcon would later be sold separately.

== Compatibility ==
The Jogcon is fully compatible with games such as Ridge Racer Type 4, V-Rally 2, Pac-Man World, Crash Team Racing, the PlayStation version of Breakout, and the PlayStation 2 game Ridge Racer V. In other games, it can be used as a regular PlayStation controller by turning off the Jogcon mode using the mode switch above the PlayStation logo.

The Jogcon also has a relatively unknown neGcon compatibility mode; by holding the mode button as the PlayStation is turned on, the Jogcon wheel emulates the NeGcon's twist functionality. However, as force feedback isn't supported in this mode, the wheel will not self-center. On top of this, the default button mapping for a NeGcon usually means the X and Square buttons are used as acceleration and brake, whereas in Ridge Racer Type 4 and V-Rally 2, these controls are moved to the shoulder buttons to allow for both thumbs to control the wheel. As such, the neGcon compatibility mode expands the list of games the Jogcon can be used in significantly, but the experience is considerably more awkward than when it is used in Jogcon-compatible games.

== See also ==
- GunCon
- NeGcon
