= Motor Toon Grand Prix 2 =

1996 video game

- PAL cover art
- Developer: Polys Entertainment (Note: At the time a group within Sony Computer Entertainment Japan. Additional work by Bandit.)
- Publisher: Sony Computer Entertainment
- Producer: Brian J. Wiklem
- Designer: Kazunori Yamauchi
- Programmers: Yoshihiko Kurata, Akihiko Tan
- Composers: Seiji Toda, Hideya Nagata
- Platform: PlayStation
- Release: JP: May 24, 1996; NA: November 8, 1996; PAL: November 1996
- Genre: Kart racing
- Modes: Single-player, multiplayer

Motor Toon Grand Prix 2 (Note: Japanese: モータートゥーン・グランプリ2, Hepburn: Mōtāto~ūn guranpuri 2) is a 1996 kart racing video game developed and published by Sony Computer Entertainment for the PlayStation. It was released in the US as Motor Toon Grand Prix since its predecessor never left Japan. Polys would follow up this game with Gran Turismo and form Polyphony Digital following the game's success.

== Gameplay ==
Gameplay

It supports multiplayer using the Link Cable, but does not support split-screen.

== Characters ==
- Captain Rock (Pilot)
- Bolbox (Robot)
- Penguin Bros. (Mafia Penguins)
- Princess Jean (Spoiled Princess)
- Raptor & Raptor (Extra-Terrestrials)
- Ching Tong Shang (Chinese race car driver)
- Vanity (Motor-bike driver)
- Billy the Tough (Train Driver)

== Development and release ==
In response to the lackluster reception of the original, the staff was determined to make this sequel as good as possible. Three new characters were added as well as five new courses. Motor Toon Grand Prix R, one of the six unlockable bonus modes, allows players to drive a realistic Formula 1 car or a Stock car at 60 frames per second serves as a precursor to the Gran Turismo series.

Following its overseas release, a reverse-import version named Motor Toon Grand Prix USA Edition was developed, incorporating further adjustments to the game balance. This version was released in Japan on March 20, 1997. In February 2008, it was re-released on the Japanese PlayStation Network.

In 2002, the game was re-released in Europe in a Twin Pack with Gran Turismo. In July 2010, the game was re-released on PlayStation Network in the West. Motor Toon Grand Prix 2 was also among a number of PlayStation titles released on the Sony Tablet S and other PlayStation Certified mobile devices in 2011.

== Reception ==
Reception

Aggregate score
Aggregator	Score
GameRankings	82%

Review scores
Publication	Score
Computer and Video Games	3/5
Edge	7/10
Electronic Gaming Monthly	8.5/10, 8/10
Famitsu	27/40 (USA Edition)
GameRevolution	B+
GameSpot	7.9/10
Next Generation	4/5
Dengeki PlayStation	60/100, 85/100, 85/100, 80/100

Motor Grand Prix 2 received positive reviews, with critics generally praising the comedic power-ups and eye-catching graphics, and commenting that underneath the game's cartoonish exterior are genuinely solid racing gameplay and controls. GamePro criticized that selecting power-ups from the spinning menu can be awkward, but summarized that, "It's slick, fast, and, yes, goofy fun for real race fans." Hugh Sterbakov wrote in GameSpot that while the lack of a split screen multiplayer is a problem, the game overall "delivers for kids and kids-at-heart alike." Todd Mowatt of Electronic Gaming Monthly called it "an excellent racing game that any fan of this genre, young or old, can enjoy."

Next Generation reviewed the game, and stated that "Motor Toon is fast, gorgeous, and very different from anything else seen in the U.S. (besides gray market copies of the original Motor Toon, of course). What more could you want?"
