= Test Drive Unlimited 2 =

2011 video game

- North American cover art featuring (from left-to-right) the Bugatti Veyron, the Aston Martin One-77, and the Chevrolet Camaro SS
- Developer: Eden Games
- Publisher: Atari
- Director: Alain Jarniou
- Producers: Nour Polloni; Olivier Raffard
- Series: Test Drive
- Platforms: Microsoft Windows; PlayStation 3; Xbox 360
- Release: NA: 8 February 2011; AU: 10 February 2011; EU: 11 February 2011
- Genre: Racing
- Modes: Single-player, multiplayer

Test Drive Unlimited 2 is a 2011 racing video game developed by Eden Games and published by Atari for Microsoft Windows, PlayStation 3 and Xbox 360. It is the sequel to the 2006 game Test Drive Unlimited and the nineteenth entry in the Test Drive series and was released on 8 February 2011.

== Gameplay ==
Test Drive Unlimited 2 includes a variety of roads on the island of Oʻahu, which returns from the first game, and the island of Ibiza. The game features three main vehicle categories, with each vehicle also belonging to a subcategory depending on quality – A for modern asphalt cars (A7 to A1), B for off-road vehicles (B4 to B2), which is a new feature in Unlimited 2, and C for classic cars (C4 to C1), with an additional M category for motorcycles (included in DLC). The vehicle subcategory is noted in the form of a number; the lower the number, the higher the quality. The plot revolves around the Player's customizable avatar, who is offered the chance to enter a series of tournaments and progresses through the game in order to eventually become the winner of the Solar Crown by defeating a number of NPCs in various races.

To participate in the Solar Crown competition, the Player must complete the racing school tests to obtain the driving licences of each categories which led by respective instructors: Marco Luzzini of category A, Jane O'Mahan of category B, and Todd Bishop of category C.

=== Plot ===
The Player character is a broke valet driver working in Ibiza for Tess Wintory, host of the 2011 Solar Crown, a highly popular racing championship. Tess berates the Player for arriving late; she considers firing them, but seeing as they are a car enthusiast, she has second thoughts, and asks them to escort her to the Sant Antoni de Portmany club, in exchange for entering them in the Solar Crown. On the way to the club, Tess explains one of the racers withdrew, leaving an open position for the player. Tess herself is also a contestant in the championship, and enrolls the player to dampen the competition.

At the club, Tess introduces the Player to the viewers of Solar Crown. She explains how they need to gain racing licenses for each class of vehicle, in order to legally partake in the races and challenges of the respective class. She introduces the Player to Todd Bishop, a driving instructor for the classic car racing school, who takes them to a used car dealership. There, the Player chooses a car, and Todd takes them to a run-down caravan, which becomes the Player's house.

Throughout the game, the Player earns their way up the ranks of the championship. They can use money earned from races to buy houses, cars (which are needed for certain races) and clothes from dealerships and stores around the islands. The other contestants of the tournament will also challenge the Player in one-on-one races, putting their beloved cars on the line. After reaching a moderate status in the competition, the championship moves to Oʻahu.

Not wanting to lose to a rookie, Tess and her father Stuart Wintory, another contestant and sponsor of the tournament, rig the competition to prevent the Player from winning. The championship ends with a colossal time trial race around Oʻahu, where the Player becomes the ultimate winner of the Solar Crown.

=== Location ===
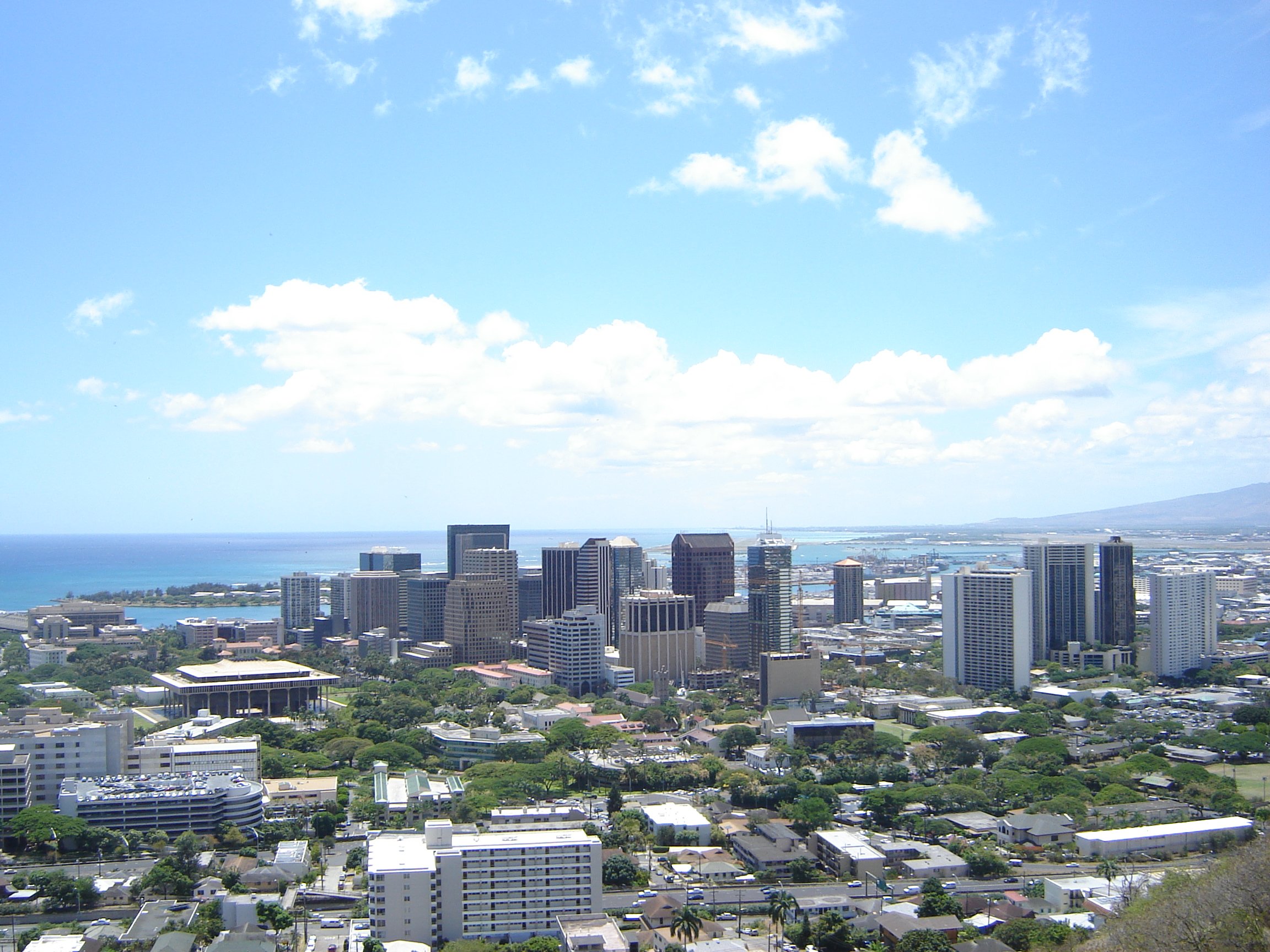
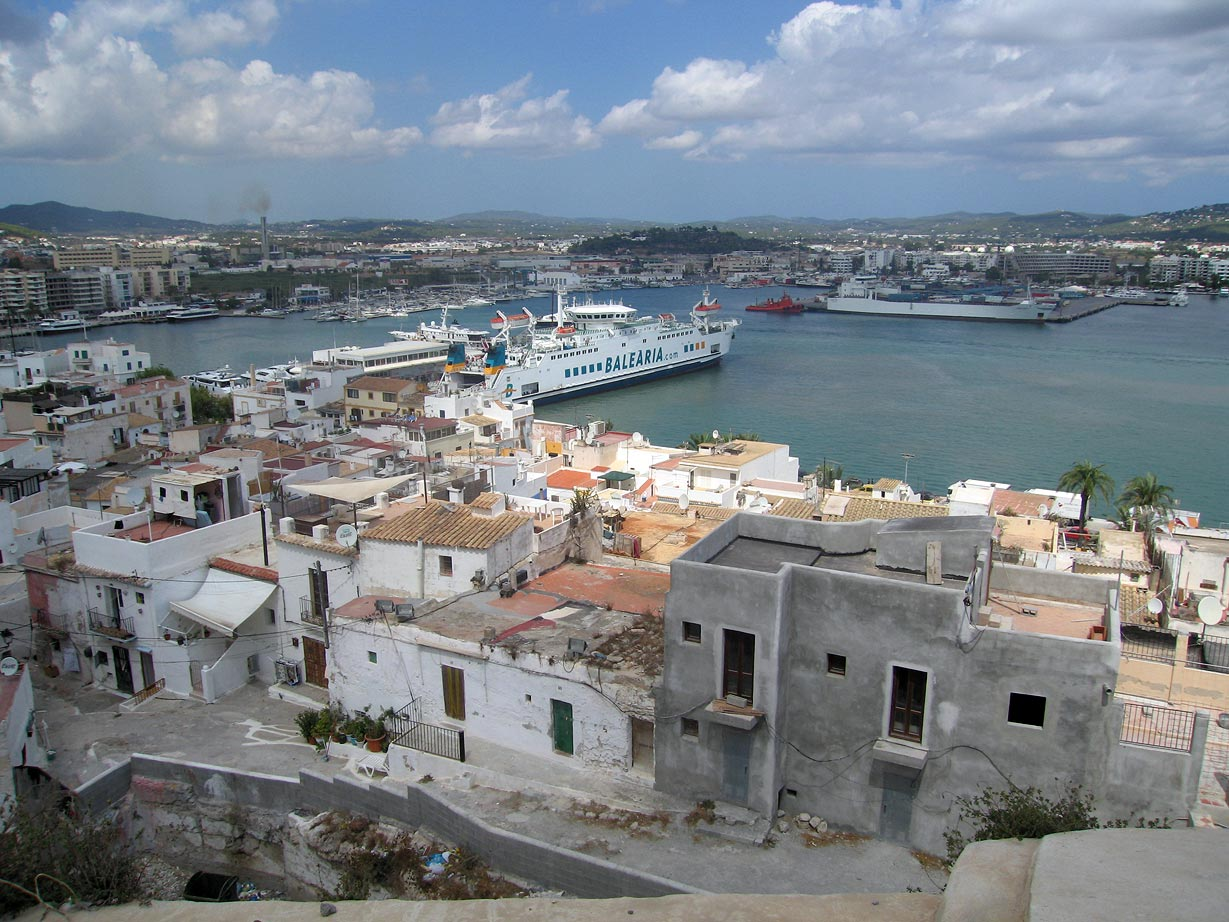
Oʻahu, Hawaii (above) and Ibiza, Spain (below) are the two locations featured in the video game.

The game is set upon two islands: Ibiza (an island in the Balearic Islands, a Spanish territory) and Oʻahu (one of the Hawaiian Islands; returning from Unlimited). Both islands have been modeled mostly accurately by using satellite data. Each island has both asphalt roads and off-road routes, translated to roughly two-thirds of all roads being asphalt roads, and the total length of road exceeds 3,000 kilometers (1,864 miles). The racing of the game is similar with the previous game, and there are three championship cups, for each vehicle class, to win in the game (one in Ibiza and two on Oʻahu).

The islands have new challenges and races to earn extra cash, and the roads on Oʻahu have been modified to give the location a fresh look, especially for those who played the previous game. Oʻahu has also been renewed graphically to stay up to date for the new game, and each island features a 24-hour cycle and dynamic weather. The player can travel between the two islands by driving to the airport on one island, where a cutscene shows the character taking off as a passenger on a plane, and then flying to the next location on the other island. This air-commuting ability needs to be unlocked by reaching Level 10 in the game. The airports have modeled interiors which, like car dealerships and other locations, allows online players to interact with other online players in the same location. With the release of the second DLC, the player also has the option to instantly change islands instead of entering the airport. However, they can still choose to enter the airport if the player desires to do so.

=== Multiplayer ===
Test Drive Unlimited 2 has a similar online mode to the previous game; free roam driving. During free roaming, up to eight players can join a session at the same time. The ability to walk is also present in the new racing lobby, homes and shops. When waiting for every player to be ready to race, cars of the other players can be examined. Also, players can be in the seat of another player's car to show or be shown different shortcuts. If a player triggers a police chase, other players can also join in the chase, either as fellow racers trying to outrun the police, or as police officers trying to arrest the racers.

The game's online servers went offline in November 2018, disabling online multiplayer and the TDU2: Casino Online expansion. However, modders restored the Windows version's online functionality via mods like TDU World, TDUniverse, and the largest of the three, Project Paradise 2.

=== TDU2: Casino Online ===
The game also features an additional paid DLC known as TDU2: Casino Online. Accessible from the start of the game, the casino includes roulette, blackjack, slot machines, among other games. The player can transfer their Unlimited 2 in-game currency to casino chips to play the games. Since the servers shutdown in November 2018, the Casino DLC is no longer accessible officially, but some functionality has been restored via the various private server mods.

== Reception ==
Reception

Aggregate score
Aggregator	Score
Metacritic	(PC) 72/100 (PS3) 70/100 (X360) 68/100

Review scores
Publication	Score
Destructoid	4/10
Eurogamer	7/10
Game Informer	8.5/10
GameSpot	7/10
GameSpy	2.5/5
IGN	5.5/10
The Daily Telegraph	7/10
The Escapist	2/5

Test Drive Unlimited 2 received "mixed or average" reviews according to review aggregator website Metacritic.

Destin Legarie from Destructoid gave a negative review of the game, awarding it a score of 4 out of 10 and commented that Test Drive Unlimited 2 was "surrounded by a bug filled world, glitchy gameplay, and a core mechanic that doesn't function".

Oli Welsh from Eurogamer gave the game a score of 7 out of 10. In his review, Welsh called Unlimited 2 "fantastic escapism", complimenting the atmosphere and multi-player components. Otherwise, he criticized the theme, commenting that "for a game so obsessed with image and lifestyle, TDU2 is hilariously, if endearingly, uncool" and concluding "it's just a shame it sometimes needs to escape from itself".

Matthew Kato from Game Informer praised the game, awarding it 8.5 out of 10 and complimenting the mixture of open-world and online interactions with the single-player competitions and the free roam, calling them a "cohesive experience". He finally stated that Test Drive Unlimited 2 "might be lacking in most critical areas, but this is one instance where the sheer quantity of features prevails since their structure is thoughtful enough to make this game more than just a lazy vacation".

Jane Douglas from GameSpot was less enthusiastic with the game, awarding it a score of 7 out of 10, complimenting the open world and online interactions as "attractive", but stating that, as a whole, the game "doesn't do any one thing better than a number of more specific, less expansive driving games".

Rory Manion from GameSpy gave the game a score of 2.5 out of 5 stars. She compared the title to other modern racers: "Want exciting racing? Grab Need for Speed: Shift, or Burnout Paradise, or Need for Speed: Hot Pursuit. Want the best driving model? Gran Turismo. Best car customization? TDU2's piddly sticker shops don't hold a candle to Forza Motorsport 3".

Ryan Clements from IGN was disappointed with the game, awarding it a mixed 5.5 out of 10: "This open-world driving experience is riddled with problems and even the driving itself is far from perfect". He did not like the "ugly character models" and voice acting in the game, considering that it "will annoy at first and then grow to intolerable levels as they're repeated constantly".

Jon Denton from The Daily Telegraph gave the game a score of 7 out of 10, naming it "another flawed gem" from Eden Games, and stating that "Test Drive Unlimited 2 teaches us that it's not just the open world you create, but what you do within it that really forms its identity".

Steve Butts from The Escapist also gave the game a 2 stars out of 5, calling the game "a wreck, burdened with a laughable economy, too much irrelevant content and weak multiplayer options". He also commented that the game "definitely has its moments", further concluding that he "can't deny the game's quirky charm".

According to BigBen Interactive, as of December 2016 estimated sales for Test Drive Unlimited 2 were put at roughly 1.8 million units sold.

== Technical issues ==
At release, the game suffered from a series of reoccurring bugs, particularly on PC, which can seriously affect gameplay, and which prompted the studio to disable the multiplayer functionality due to connection and server issues. General issues included: server blackouts, repeatedly dropped connections, inability to add friends in-game, and many other advertised online features malfunctioning or not functioning at all. Several patches have been released to resolve the issues, as well as several free or fee-based downloadable content packages and individual items (i.e., new missions, cars). The initial download is free but the virtual vehicles carry a real-world cost in the form of in-game 'tokens' obtainable for real money. For the PC version of the game, the price was set at 80 Atari tokens each, and the smallest amount of 'Atari tokens' available for purchase is a bundle of 400 tokens for US$5.

There have been many bugs reported in the game, and across all gaming platforms for which the game was released. These include, but are not limited to: corrupted saved game files issue which ultimately forces the player to forfeit all accumulated in-game assets and current progress by having to start the game anew under a newly created profile. Also reported frequently are issues with the multiplayer functions, such as players being unable to connect to each other. These server issues also prevent anyone trying to start the game in "connected mode" or connected to Xbox Live or PlayStation Network. A patch has been released to fix some of these issues, including the activation of the Club feature, which was disabled to correct exploits in the system. On the same day the patch was released for the PC, Atari sent console patches to both Microsoft and Sony for approval.

On 10 March 2011, Atari had announced that save corruption fixes for the PlayStation 3 and Xbox 360 would go live on the next day. However, just as it was for the previous iteration of Test Drive Unlimited, the patches never did seem to be fully successful in addressing the issues and fixing the glitches and bugs encountered by players.

As of 8 October 2012, players across all platforms were still reporting problems. Atari also stated that additional patches for both consoles would be available 14 March 2011. After this update, Xbox 360 users began to have network and server issues. The PlayStation 3 patch was released three day later, giving access to MyTDULife and Clubs.

== Sequel ==
A third Test Drive Unlimited game, officially known as Test Drive Unlimited Solar Crown, was announced on 7 July 2020. Unlike the two previous games, it is being developed by Kylotonn (under the KT Racing banner) and published by Nacon. The game's location is set to take place on Hong Kong Island and later expanded to Ibiza on 24 December 2024, following the game's second season update. The game was released on 12 September 2024.
