= Motor Toon Grand Prix =

1994 video game

- Cover art depicting Captain Rock (center), Penguin Bros. (first on the left), Bolbox (behind on the left), Princess Jean (first on the right) and Raptor & Raptor (second on the right)
- Developer: Polys Entertainment (Note: At the time a group within Sony Computer Entertainment Japan. Additional work by Bandit.)
- Publisher: Sony Computer Entertainment
- Director: Kazunori Yamauchi
- Producers: Toshiyuki Miyata; Yukio Nagasaki
- Designer: Kazunori Yamauchi
- Programmer: Yoshihiko Kurata
- Artist: Susumu Matsushita
- Composers: Seiji Toda; Hideya Nagata
- Platform: PlayStation
- Release: JP: December 16, 1994
- Genre: Kart racing
- Modes: Single-player, multiplayer

Motor Toon Grand Prix (Note: Japanese: モータートゥーン・グランプリ, Hepburn: Mōtātoūn Guranpuri) is a 1994 kart racing video game developed and published by Sony Computer Entertainment for the PlayStation. It was released exclusively in Japan. The game and its sequel were directed by Kazunori Yamauchi, and are precursors to his subsequent racing series Gran Turismo.

== Gameplay ==
The game features cartoon-like visuals and comical effects.

== Development ==
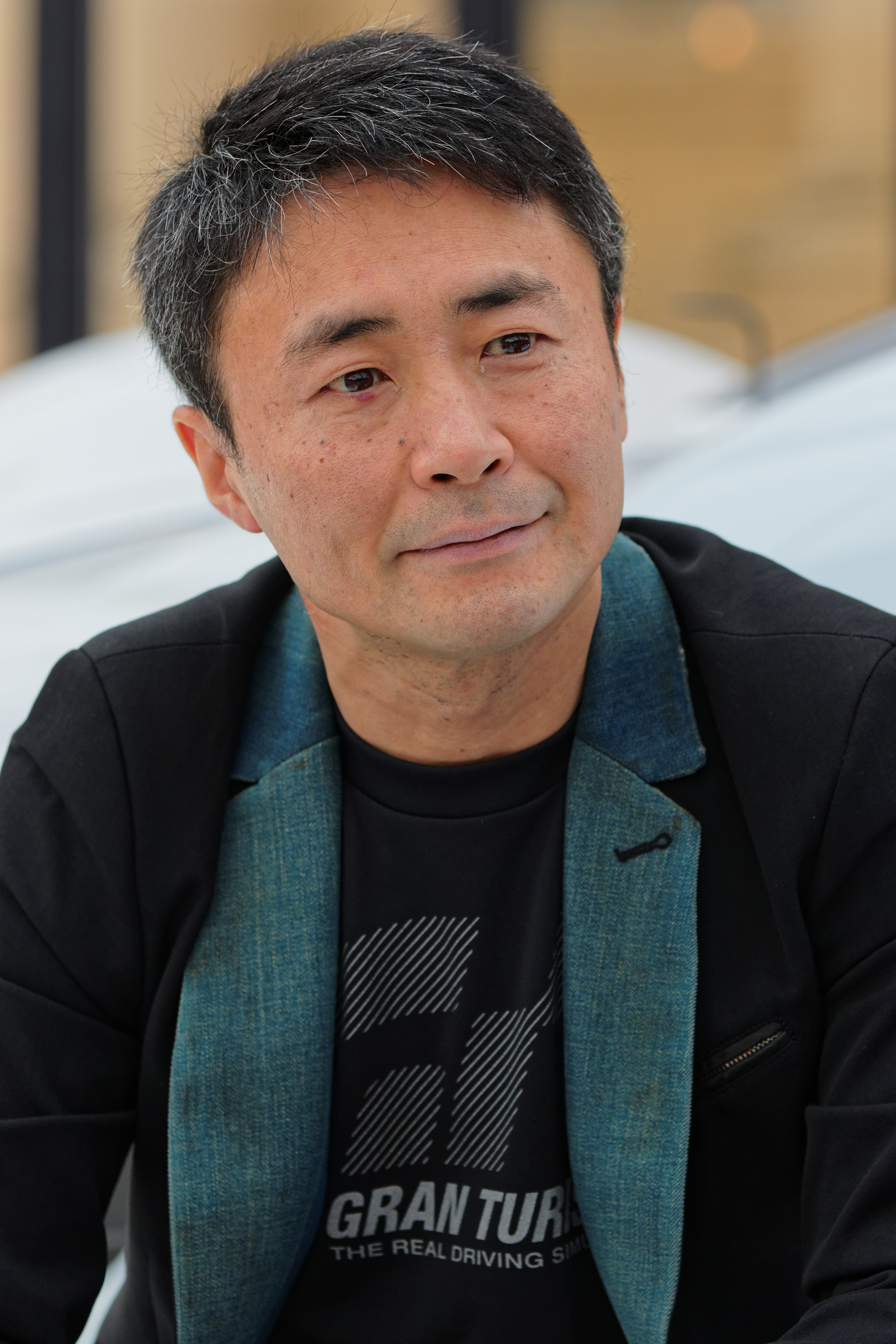
Kazunori Yamauchi was the game's director.

Motor Toon Grand Prix was developed by Polys Entertainment, a group of developers within Sony Computer Entertainment (SCE). Although they had assisted Media.Vision on the PlayStation title Crime Crackers, Motor Toon Grand Prix would serve as SCE's first major in-house project. They received additional support from third-party developer Bandit, a company which specialized in localizing games for overseas markets. Development was led by Kazunori Yamauchi, who had joined Sony in the hopes of utilizing the 3D graphical capabilities of its next generation console to craft an exceptionally accurate racing simulation. However, as Yamauchi was new to the industry, his proposal was seen as too ambitious by SCE and was initially rejected. With the success of simpler kart racing games (most notably Super Mario Kart) proving highly successful, he instead opted for a less sophisticated work with a potentially broad appeal. The project began under the working title "Poly Poly Circus Grand Prix". Illustrator Susumu Matsushita was brought in to provide his signature art style for the game's exaggerated character and vehicle designs.

Production on Motor Toon Grand Prix lasted a year and a half. The team strove to replicate a realistic gameplay experience in spite of its largely cartoon aesthetic. This meant attempting a sophisticated driving simulation without distracting from the game's enjoyment. "Basically we're not trying to fake reality – I'd rather create the sensation of handling a remote control car but with the kind of dynamics that you'd expect from a real car," Yamauchi stated. "The cars' suspensions actually work – we've attempted to simulate the dynamic forces as they go around corners." Akihiko Tan was hired as the game's car simulation engineer. Enthralled by the capability of a home console running 3D computer graphics he only thought was possible on expensive workstations, Tan eagerly joined the staff half way through production and wrote the physics models for all the cars. As development progressed, the Gouraud shaded polygons of the characters and vehicles were given texture mapped anthropomorphic features while its environment graphics were simplified to maintain a smooth frame rate. It was originally announced that the game would have PlayStation Link Cable support for its multiplayer option, but a split screen mode was implemented instead.

Staff rushed to finish the game during the final three months of development in order to meet a target completion date coinciding with the PlayStation's launch. Blaming exhaustion and lack of sleep, Yamauchi recalled that he was ultimately convinced by studio higher-ups that their work up to that point was "good enough" and that they should skip resolving certain technical issues in favor of just releasing it. Yamauchi regretted this decision as he claimed consumers shared concern of these issues when critiquing it.

== Release ==
Motor Toon Grand Prix was released exclusively in Japan on December 16, 1994, less than two weeks after the PlayStation debuted in the region. The game's main character, Captain Rock, was used by Sony for the console's release promos. Months later, Sony executive director Phil Harrison called Motor Toon Grand Prix a launch underperformer and "not indicative of the products that are coming down the line" when previewing the PlayStation's retail availability in North America and Europe. Despite this claim, a direct sequel, Motor Toon Grand Prix 2, was released internationally in 1996. As the first installment had not been localized, the sequel dropped the number "2" in its title in North America. Shortly thereafter, Polys Entertainment was spun off into Polyphony Digital. SCE allowed them to complete work on the first entry in the long-running, realistic racing franchise Gran Turismo, basing its gameplay engine on the one originally crafted for Motor Toon Grand Prix and refined in its sequel.

== Reception ==
Reception

Review scores
Publication	Score
Computer and Video Games	59%
Edge	6/10
Famitsu	27/40
Joypad	94%
M! Games	70%
Mega Fun	85%
Next Generation	2/5
Super Game Power	3.8/5
Dengeki PlayStation	70/100, 75/100, 60/100, 50/100
PlayStation Plus	51%
Power Unlimited	86%
Última Generación	86%

In Japan, Famitsu scored it 27 points out of 40 (9, 6, 6, 6). The reviewers liked the "colorful and surreal" environment, but were critical of the lack of a "sense of speed". The game was also imported and reviewed by magazines. Next Generation gave it two out of five stars. They highly praised the Time Attack mode, but said that the two-player modes are disappointing due to the split screen cutting away too much of the player's forward view and players not being allowed to choose the same car. They further criticized that "the odd foibles of MTGP and the unnatural way in which the cars handle means it falls well short of Ridge Racer in challenge and excitement." Computer and Video Games, while praising graphics and sound, noted that the game was a "rush job" and that issues in the game made some gameplay elements "frustrating".
