= Gear.Club Unlimited =

Racing video game franchise

- North American game cover of Gear.Club Unlimited featuring the W Motors Lykan HyperSport and Pagani Huayra
- Genre: Racing
- Developer: Eden Games
- Publishers: Microïds (2017-2021); Nacon (2026)
- Platforms: Nintendo Switch, iOS, Android, PlayStation 4, Xbox One, PlayStation 5, Xbox Series X/S, Microsoft Windows, Nintendo Switch 2

Gear.Club Unlimited is a racing video game series developed by Eden Games. The first game, an expanded version of the iOS/Android mobile game Gear.Club, was published by Microïds and released on the Nintendo Switch on November 21, 2017 in North America, in Europe on December 1, 2017, and in Japan on December 14, 2017.

A sequel, Gear.Club Unlimited 2, was announced in 2018. It was released on December 4, 2018 for the Nintendo Switch, as well as the Ultimate Edition on November 30, 2021 for the PlayStation 4, PlayStation 5, Xbox One, Xbox Series X/S, and Microsoft Windows.

The third title in the series, Gear.Club Unlimited 3, was released by Nacon on the Nintendo Switch 2 on February 19, 2026. The game is scheduled to arrive on PlayStation 5, Xbox Series X/S, and Microsoft Windows later in the year.

== Gameplay ==
Gear.Club Unlimited is a racing video game where the player controls a car to race it from the starting line to the finish line. The game starts off where the player is lent a McLaren 570S to test out the controls and gameplay. With enough money to buy a Nissan 370Z or a Chevrolet Camaro 1LS. The player starts off in the lowest championships and starts racing to get enough stars to unlock new zones in the game's map, which represents Southern Europe. There are three types of racing, Race, Rally and Time attack. The game also has a "rewind" feature that can be used if a mistake is made, enabling the player to effectively turn back time and try to recover from their errors.

Gear.Club Unlimited has 32 cars including the W Motors Lykan Hypersport, the Acura NSX, the McLaren P1, the Pagani Huayra Roadster, the Ford Mustang GT, the AC 378 GT Zagato and more.The cars are divided into 4 classes, A, B, C, D, which are in turn divided into multiple sub-groups.

Gear.Club Unlimited 3 contains a total of 39 cars, with an additional three models available for purchase via DLC. New manufacturers include Subaru, Honda, and Mazda, though former included manufacturers Chevrolet, Jaguar, and MINI are absent in the game's roster of vehicles.The sequel also introduces two new event types, Duel Mode and Highway Rush.

== Development ==
The game started development in late 2014 when Eden Games became an independent games studio free of Atari.

In June 2017, publisher Microïds announced a line-up of games they were releasing for the Nintendo Switch, one of which was believed as a port of the mobile game Gear.Club. In early August 2017, Microïds revealed via Nintendo Life that the title is in fact Gear.Club Unlimited, which is an expansion to the free-to-play mobile game with additional cars and modes. Later that month, Microïds confirmed a 1 December 2017 release date, although they later clarified in October the December release date only applies to Europe, and announced the game will release in North America on 24 November 2017, with a limited physical release exclusive to GameStop. Prior to the game's launch, Eden Games collaborated with DriveTribe for a giveaway to its members, whom were eligible to receive a limited quantity code that allowed them to unlock the Chevrolet Camaro 50th Anniversary car in the game.

In an interview with Red Bull, developer Eden Games clarified that Gear.Club Unlimited, unlike its free-to-play mobile predecessor Gear.Club, is a full premium title and has no microtransactions. They added that the game capitalizes on the Nintendo Switch's power and attributes, stating the graphical fidelity will be 1080p at a steady 30 fps in docked mode, and that the game supports splitscreen local multiplayer with up to four players using a single Joy-Con controller. There are also plans for future downloadable content.

== Reception ==
The game received "mixed or average reviews" on Metacritic with a score of 64. It was consistently praised for its graphics, gameplay and lack of microtransactions, but criticised for its short and repetitive races and its weak AI.
