= Eden Games =

French video game developer

Eden Games SA
- Formerly: Eden Studios (1998–2002)
- Type: Subsidiary
- Industry: Video games
- Founded: 4 January 1998
- Founders: David Nadal; Jean Yves Geffroy
- Headquarters: Lyon, France
- Key people: David Nadal (CEO)
- Number of employees: 70
- Parent: Atari SA (2002–2013): Engine Media (2017–2022); Animoca Brands (2022–present)
- Website: www.edengames.com

Eden Games SA (formerly known as Eden Studios) is a French video game developer based in Lyon that mainly focuses on the development of racing video games.

== History ==
The company was formed as a development group within Infogrames' European subsidiary Infogrames Multimedia, which had developed the first V-Rally for the PlayStation. The studio would later rebrand into its own separate studio, known as Eden Studios, with Infogrames holding a 19.2% minority share.

In April 2002, Infogrames fully acquired Eden Studios. While fully owned by the company itself, the studio was represented in the United States by the then publicly traded division Infogrames, Inc. During this period, the company would continue develop racing games such as Test Drive Unlimited and its sequel, Test Drive Unlimited 2, while also venturing into other game genres with games like Kya: Dark Lineage.

Atari announced that throughout April 2011, they had laid off over 51 of the 80 employees working at the studio, leading to a majority of the employees going on strike. In April 2012, Eden began negotiations as an attempt to separate from Atari. On 29 January 2013 the studio filed for judicial liquidation.

On 31 October 2013, under the impulsion of former employees and with the financing of ID Invest and Monster Capital, Eden Games reopened as an independent game development studio without any involvement of Atari. The company then released its first game, GT Spirit, on Apple TV in December 2015. The game was later followed up with Gear.Club and two Nintendo Switch versions - Gear.Club Unlimited and Gear.Club Unlimited 2.

From 2017 to 2021, the company was a subsidiary of Engine Media.

In April 2022, Eden Games were acquired by the Hong Kong–based blockchain gaming company, Animoca Brands. According to Animoca, the Eden team will be integrated into their business and work on blockchain-based racing games and contribute to Animoca's existing titles build around its REVV crypto token.

== Games developed ==
Year	Title	Platform(s)	Publisher(s)
1998	V-Rally Edition '99	Nintendo 64	Infogrames
1999	V-Rally 2: Championship Edition; Need for Speed: V-Rally 2	PlayStation	Infogrames
1999	V-Rally 2: Championship Edition; Need for Speed: V-Rally 2	PlayStation	Electronic Arts
2000	Need for Speed: Porsche Unleashed	PlayStation	Electronic Arts
2000	V-Rally 2: Expert Edition; Test Drive: V-Rally	Dreamcast	Infogrames
2000	V-Rally 2: Expert Edition	Windows	Infogrames
2002	V-Rally 3	PlayStation 2	Infogrames
2003	V-Rally 3	Xbox	Infogrames
2003	V-Rally 3	GameCube	Infogrames
2003	V-Rally 3	Windows	Atari
2003	Kya: Dark Lineage	PlayStation 2	Atari
2004	Titeuf: Méga-compet'	PlayStation 2	Atari
2004	Titeuf: Méga-compet'	Windows	Atari
2006	Test Drive Unlimited	Xbox 360	Atari
2007	Test Drive Unlimited	Windows	Atari
2008	Alone in the Dark	Xbox 360	Atari
2008	Alone in the Dark	Windows	Atari
2008	Alone in the Dark: Inferno	PlayStation 3	Atari
2011	Test Drive Unlimited 2	PlayStation 3	Atari
2011	Test Drive Unlimited 2	Xbox 360	Atari
2011	Test Drive Unlimited 2	Windows	Atari
2015	GT Spirit	Apple TV	Eden Games
2016	Gear.Club	iOS	Eden Games
2016	Gear.Club	Android	Eden Games
2016	Gear.Club	Amazon Appstore	Eden Games
2017	Gear.Club Unlimited	Nintendo Switch	Microids
2018	Gear.Club Unlimited 2	Nintendo Switch	Microids
2018	F1 Mobile Racing (Note: Co-developed with Codemasters.)	iOS	Codemasters
2018	F1 Mobile Racing	Android	Codemasters
2019	Gear.Club Unlimited 2: Porsche Edition	Nintendo Switch	Microids
2020	Gear.Club Unlimited 2: Tracks Edition	Nintendo Switch	Microids
2021	Gear.Club Unlimited 2: Definitive Edition	Nintendo Switch	Microids
2021	Gear.Club Unlimited 2: Ultimate Edition	PlayStation 4	Microids
2021	Gear.Club Unlimited 2: Ultimate Edition	Xbox One	Microids
2021	Gear.Club Unlimited 2: Ultimate Edition	PlayStation 5	Microids
2021	Gear.Club Unlimited 2: Ultimate Edition	Xbox Series X/S	Microids
2021	Gear.Club Unlimited 2: Ultimate Edition	Windows	Microids
2022	Gear.Club Stradale	Apple Arcade	Eden Games
2022	Smurfs Kart	Nintendo Switch	Microids
2023	Smurfs Kart	PlayStation 5	Microids
2023	Smurfs Kart	Xbox Series X/S	Microids
2023	Smurfs Kart	Windows	Microids
2024	Cosmic Royale	Microsoft Windows	Eden Games
2025	Garfield Kart 2: All you can Drift	PlayStation 5	Microids
2025	Garfield Kart 2: All you can Drift	Xbox Series X/S	Microids
2025	Garfield Kart 2: All you can Drift	Nintendo Switch	Microids
2025	Garfield Kart 2: All you can Drift	Windows	Microids
2026	Cosmic Royale	iOS	Eden Games
2026	Gear.Club Unlimited 3	PlayStation 5	Nacon
2026	Gear.Club Unlimited 3	Xbox Series X/S	Nacon
2026	Gear.Club Unlimited 3	Nintendo Switch 2	Nacon
2026	Gear.Club Unlimited 3	Windows	Nacon
