= Hirokazu Hamamura =

Japanese magazine editor and businessman

Hirokazu Hamamura (浜村 弘一, Hamamura Hirokazu; born February 8, 1961), former Weekly Famitsu chief editor, now is president of Enterbrain. He is also the director of Kadokawa Group Holdings, Kadokawa Group Publishing, Kadokawa Games and Walker Books. His pen name is Hamamura Tsūshin (浜村通信).

== Career ==
Hamamura was born in Osaka Prefecture. He went on to study at Osaka Prefectural Tondabayashi Junior and Senior High School and then at Waseda University Literature Department. During his enrollment, he worked part-time at Sofmap and Comptiq. After graduating in 1985, he joined ASCII Corporation editing for Login and Famitsu. He was appointed vice editor-in-chief in 1990 and later editor-in-chief in 1992.

In 1996 due to internal discord within ASCII management, Hamamura's predecessor as editor-in-chief Fumitaka Kojima and others resigned to establish Axela, though Hamamura decided to remain with ASCII. In 2000, he became president of Enterbrain. In 2002, he handed over the editorship of Famitsu to Katsuaki Katou, but he continued to have a strong influence with his personal column printed at the back of the magazine. He also often appears as a commentator in economic articles when news media covers the game industry.

Hamamura often appears as a guest character in various video games. In 2008, Capcom's Monster Hunter Frontier Z held an event called Hamamura Souken Monogatari. In 2019, Hamamura appeared in Hideo Kojima's video game Death Stranding, providing his likeness for the character of the Collector.
