= Pfeifer Broz. Music =

American trailer music company

Pfeifer Broz. Music was a musical consultant and production team (Jeffrey & Robert Pfeifer), similar to Immediate Music, and others who develop and exclusively distributes high-end trailer music. According to the SoundtrackNet Profile of the enterprise, Pfeifer Broz. Music has provided music for the trailers of The Lord of the Rings: The Fellowship of the Ring, Harry Potter and the Order of the Phoenix, Harry Potter and the Deathly Hallows, Alice in Wonderland, The Chronicles of Narnia: Prince Caspian, Transformers, Casino Royale, Quantum of Solace, The Spiderwick Chronicles, Salt, Blood Diamond, Underworld, Pirates of the Caribbean: Dead Man's Chest and an orchestral version of the theme song to the 2008 Sex and the City: The Movie.

Pfeifer Broz. Music was directly marketed for the motion picture company and was not sold to the general public. They are located, as with many of the other trailer music production companies, in Southern California.

They are known for their loud and powerful orchestral and choral tracks, but they have some less famous albums, which contain rock and country.

== See also ==
- Trailer music
