= V-Rally (video game) =

1997 video game

- European PlayStation cover art featuring Subaru Impreza WRC
- Developer: Infogrames Multimedia (Note: Eden Studios developed the Nintendo 64 version, Velez & Dubail developed the Game Boy and Game Boy Color versions, and Ideaworks3D developed the Symbian version.)
- Publishers: PlayStation: EU: Infogrames Multimedia; NA: Electronic Arts; Game Boy: EU: Ocean; Other platforms Infogrames
- Director: Stéphane Baudet
- Programmer: David Nadal
- Series: V-Rally
- Platforms: PlayStation, Game Boy, Nintendo 64, Game Boy Color, Windows, Symbian
- Release: 4 July 1997: PlayStation; EU: 4 July 1997; NA: 4 November 1997 Game Boy; EU: 3 July 1998 Nintendo 64; EU: 11 December 1998; NA: 15 September 1999 Game Boy Color; EU: 9 April 1999; NA: 4 June 1999 Windows; EU: June 1999
- Genre: Racing
- Modes: Single-player, multiplayer

V-Rally (Note: The game is also known as V-Rally: 97 Championship Edition, Need for Speed: V-Rally, V-Rally: Championship Edition, V-Rally: Edition '99, or V-Rally: Multiplayer Championship Edition, depending on the region or platform.) is a 1997 racing video game developed and published by Infogrames Multimedia for the PlayStation. The first game in the V-Rally series, it is based on the 1997 and 1998 World Rally Championship seasons, and features officially licensed cars and tracks inspired by real locations of rally events. Players drive rally cars through a series of stages spread over eight different locations, including European countries like England, Spain and Sweden, and island countries such as Indonesia and New Zealand. As a simulation game, V-Rally places a strong emphasis on replicating the behavior physics of real cars and generally requires more practice than arcade-style racers.

The game was developed over the course of nearly two years by a team that would later be known as Eden Studios. Former rally world champion Ari Vatanen worked on the game as a technical consultant, giving the developers insight on how the cars should handle collisions and drifts. Upon release, the game was critically and commercially successful in Europe, selling more than two million copies as of November 1998. However, the game was not very successful in North America. Critics generally praised its large number of tracks and challenging yet rewarding gameplay, but some criticized its overly-sensitive and difficult controls. After its release on the PlayStation console, V-Rally was ported to multiple platforms, including the Nintendo 64, Game Boy Color, and Microsoft Windows. A sequel, V-Rally 2, was released in 1999.

== Gameplay ==
The player races against computer-controlled opponents on a track set in Corsica, France. The player's position is shown at the top right corner.

V-Rally is a racing simulation game where players drive rally cars through a series of stages or tracks. The game places a strong emphasis on replicating the behavior physics of real cars and generally requires more practice than arcade-style racers. Aspects such as the weather conditions, the road surfaces, and the drive wheel configurations have a significant impact on the car handling. Weather conditions include rain and snow, while road surfaces range from asphalt to gravel or dirt. Races can take place at night or during the day. The game features both Kit Cars and World Rally Cars for players to choose from. Kit Cars are two-wheel drive and include cars such as the Peugeot 306 Maxi or Renault Maxi Megane, while World Rally Cars are four-wheel drive and include cars such as the Subaru Impreza WRC or Mitsubishi Lancer WRC. Before starting a race, players have the option to tweak their car setup with tighter suspensions, quicker gear ratios, understeer or oversteer sensitivity, and choice of manual or automatic transmission.

The game features three gameplay modes: Arcade, Championship, and Time Trial. In Arcade, players race against opponents controlled by the game's artificial intelligence in three series of stages. Each series must be completed in a linear fashion and its stages have multiple checkpoints that must be reached in a specified time. Players start with three credits and, if they lose a stage or fail to reach a checkpoint, they will lose one credit. If players run out of credits, the game will be over. Players can get additional credits by winning individual stages. Championship is similar to Arcade, but stages have no checkpoints and players are awarded points based on the rank they finish courses. The game offers more than 40 stages spread over eight different locations, including European countries like England, Spain and Sweden, and island countries such as Indonesia and New Zealand. Time Trial allows players to race on any stage and record the fastest lap time. All three modes support one or two players. If two players compete against each other, a split screen feature is used.

== Development and release ==
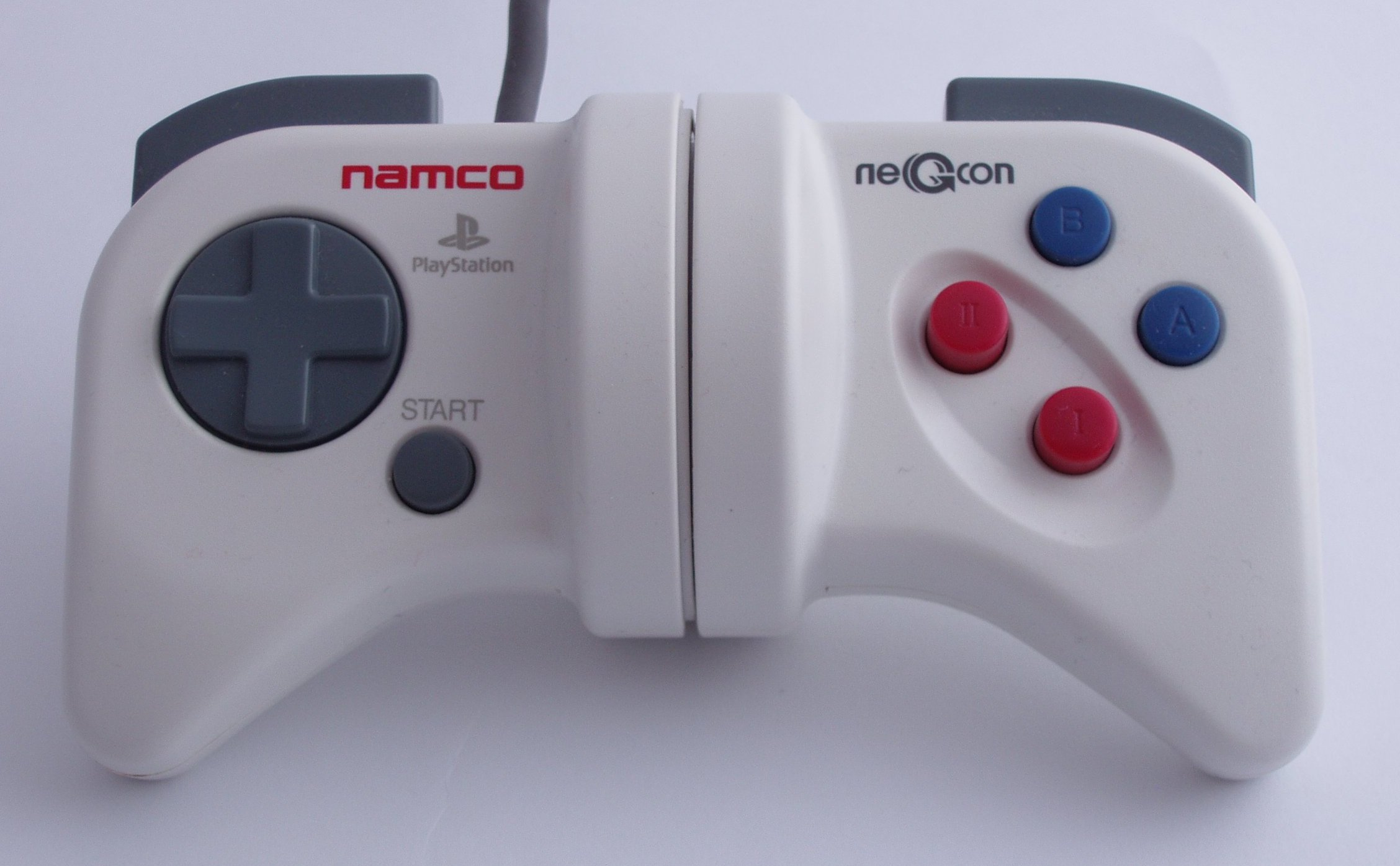
V-Rally supports the NeGcon controller by Namco.

V-Rally was developed for the PlayStation console by an Infogrames team based in Lyon, France. This team, composed of 20 full-time people, would later be known as Eden Studios. Because the PlayStation development kits did not cover the requirements needed for the game, the developers decided to create their own programming tools, including the game engine. The game's environments and cars are fully rendered in 3D, while the Gouraud shading method was used to give 3D objects a smoother surface. All the cars that are featured in the game were officially licensed, including their stickers. Former rally world champion Ari Vatanen gave the developers insight on how the cars should handle collisions and drifts. Vatanen noted that, although each car practically features the same control concepts, there are significant differences between two-wheel drive and four-wheel drive vehicles. The game supports the NeGcon controller by Namco, allowing players to steer their car around curves in an analog manner.

Originally, the game was intended to feature a level editor where players could create their own tracks by modifying variables such as road surface, road curves, and weather conditions. It would take the PlayStation between 30 and 60 seconds to render these tracks, which could be saved in a memory card. This option would allow players to update their game with additional tracks. Eventually, an editor would be included in the 1999 sequel V-Rally 2. Although the game's tracks are fictitious, they were inspired by real locations of rally events, such as the Rally Costa Brava in Spain. With the use of the PlayStation Link Cable, a 4 player multiplayer mode was initially planned. Similarly, developers considered the possibility of adding a rear-view mirror to the HUD, but it was ultimately discarded due to the memory constraints of the PlayStation hardware. The game's hard rock score was recorded at the Moby Dick club in Madrid. The game had a development budget of $2 million and its development took two years to complete. The V in the game's title stands for "Virtual".

Based on the 1997 World Rally Championship, V-Rally was first released in Europe on 4 July 1997 as V-Rally: 97 Championship Edition. Later that September, the game's European distributor Ocean sold the North American publishing rights to Electronic Arts. Although the game has no connection to Electronic Arts' Need for Speed series, the company released the game as Need for Speed: V-Rally in North America on 4 November. A likely reason for the title change was to draw more attention to the American market, as it was classified that rally racing was a much more popular sport in Europe than it was in America. The North American version includes the Toyota Corolla WRC as a new car. In 1998, the game was re-released as V-Rally: Championship Edition under the Platinum line. This version of the game supports the DualShock controller and includes the Toyota Corolla WRC from the North American version. In 2002, a version that comes bundled with Eagle One: Harrier Attack was also released.

== Reception ==
Reception

Aggregate score
Aggregator	Score
GameRankings	73%

Review scores
Publication	Score
Consoles +	95/100
Computer and Video Games	4/5
Edge	8/10
Electronic Gaming Monthly	4.75/10
GameRevolution	B+
GameSpot	5.4/10
HobbyConsolas	94/100
IGN	8/10
PlayStation Official Magazine – UK	9/10

In Europe, V-Rally received very positive reviews from critics, who compared it favorably to Sega Rally Championship, praising its large number of tracks and challenging yet rewarding gameplay. Official UK PlayStation Magazine described V-Rally as "a huge game, by far the most comprehensive racer on [the PlayStation] or any other platform since Psygnosis' F1", while Edge credited it for adopting a different style from other PlayStation racing games such as Rage Racer, a market the magazine considered overcrowded at the time. Editors of the French video game magazine Consoles + considered V-Rally the most effective rally simulation game they had ever played.

Computer and Video Games editors felt that the simulation aspects give V-Rally a lot of depth, but remarked that the game is not as instantly accessible as Sega Rally and that its highly sensitive controls can frustrate some players. They also considered V-Rally a more attractive game due to its better-looking graphics, which were highlighted for their details and long draw distance. The replay value was seen as one of the game's strongest points, mainly because of the variety of tracks and weather conditions. The Spanish video game magazine HobbyConsolas noted the game's varied scenery, stating that each track offers unique challenges. The magazine said that, although it can take some time to get used to the controls, the effort is ultimately rewarding due to the game's "impressive" sense of speed.

In North America, reviews were generally not as positive. GameSpot condemned the controls, saying that the cars "spin out much, much too easily, and even with understeering turned all the way up in the options, the cars still tend to go wild". Although the website highlighted the game's "impressive" number of cars and tracks, especially when compared to most games of the time, it concluded that the game is not worth playing due to its "shoddy control". Electronic Gaming Monthly editors agreed, describing the car physics and collision detection as wacky and unnatural. GamePro instead asserted that "game control is responsive, but requires patience and practice, so arcade drivers will easily be frustrated". The reviewer concluded that V-Rally is more for hardcore rally enthusiasts than for the Need for Speed fanbase, but is a strong offering in that regard, citing its customization options, useful co-pilot voice, and detailed and smoothly scrolling graphics.

Other publications were more positive towards the game. GameRevolution enjoyed the fact that weather conditions impact the gameplay experience, stressing that "once you understand that you actually need to use your brakes and concentrate on the race, the realism proves to be a great asset", while IGN felt that the game was highly rewarding and fun, and that it is best experienced when played on higher difficulty settings.

=== Sales ===
In Europe, V-Rally was a commercial success, selling 15,000 copies during its first weekend of release. In the UK, the game was a bestseller for three months, and in August 1998, the game received a "Gold" sales award from the Verband der Unterhaltungssoftware Deutschland, indicating sales of at least 100,000 units across Germany, Austria and Switzerland. As of November 1998, V-Rally had sold more than two million copies worldwide. It took home a "Gold" prize at the 1999 Milia festival in Cannes, for revenues above €22 million in the European Union during 1998. In Australia, V-Rally sold nearly 100,000 copies in its first three months of release. By 2000, V-Rally had become the third best-selling PlayStation game of all time in France, behind only Gran Turismo and Rayman.

== Ports and adaptations ==
After its release on the PlayStation console, V-Rally was ported to multiple platforms. In early 1998, Infogrames hinted that Ocean was planning to release a Nintendo 64 version of the game. Presented at the 1998 European Computer Trade Show and later at the 1999 Nintendo Space World show, the Nintendo 64 version, developed by Eden Studios and entitled V-Rally: Edition '99, was released in Europe on 11 December 1998, and in North America on 15 September 1999. It features several improvements over the original, including a revised physics engine for better vehicle feel and control, alongside updated vehicles based on the 1998 World Rally Championship. The game fits in a 96-megabit cartridge, but does not feature any music during gameplay. The Nintendo 64 version generally received more positive reviews in Europe than in North America. Criticism was targeted at its late draw-in graphics and floaty car physics, but some critics highlighted the fact that the game features more than 50 tracks. IGN remarked that the North American version would have been judged differently one year earlier, when well-received Nintendo 64 racing games such as World Driver Championship or Beetle Adventure Racing had yet to be released.

A single-player, portable adaptation for the original Game Boy was exclusively released in Europe on 3 July 1998, under Ocean.It features pseudo 3D graphics and the Arcade and Championship modes, with a total of four cars and ten tracks. An updated version of the Game Boy game was released for the Game Boy Color in Europe on 9 April 1999 as V-Rally: Championship Edition, and in North America on 4 June as V-Rally: Edition '99. Although the Game Boy Color version is not backward compatible with the Game Boy, it is essentially the same as the Game Boy version, but features colorful graphics and 20 tracks. Both versions were developed by Velez & Dubail. A Microsoft Windows version, entitled V-Rally: Multiplayer Championship Edition, was released in Europe in June 1999. It is similar to the original PlayStation version, but features sharper textures and supports online play. A Symbian version developed by Ideaworks3D was released for mobile phones such as the Sony Ericsson P800 and P900.
