= Famitsu =

Line of Japanese video game magazines

- Cover of Shūkan Famitsu for May 9–16, 2024 (#1847) issue, featuring Acheron and Aventurine of Honkai: Star Rail
- Categories: Video game
- Frequency: Weekly / Monthly
- Format: Paper and online magazine
- Circulation: 500,000 (Shūkan); 120,000 (Entamikusu); 80,000 (Connect! On); 40,000 (DS+Wii)
- Publisher: ASCII (1986–2000); Enterbrain (2000–2017); Gzbrain (2017–2019); Kadokawa Game Linkage (2019–present)
- First issue: June 1986; 40 years ago (as Famicom Tsūshin)
- Country: Japan
- Based in: Tokyo
- Language: Japanese
- Website: famitsu.com

Famitsu, (Note: Japanese: ファミ通, Hepburn: Famitsū) formerly Famicom Tsūshin, (Note: Japanese: ファミコン通信; officially translated as Famicom Journal) is a line of Japanese video game magazines published by Kadokawa Game Linkage (previously known as Gzbrain), a subsidiary of Kadokawa. Famitsu is published in weekly and monthly formats, and in special issues devoted to particular themes. It was first published in 1986.

Shūkan Famitsū, (Note: Japanese: 週刊ファミ通; lit. "Weekly Famitsū") the original publication, is considered the most widely read and respected video game news magazine in Japan. From October 28, 2011, the company began releasing the digital version on BookWalker weekly.

The name Famitsu is a portmanteau abbreviation of Famicom Tsūshin; Famicom is itself an abbreviation of Family Computer, the dominant video game console in Japan when the magazine was first published.

== History ==
Cover art for the first issue of Famitsū magazine (then known as Famicom Tsūshin), June 1986. The joystick controller and the Family Computer controller can be seen on the cover.

Login, a computer game magazine, started in 1982 as an extra issue of ASCII, and later it became a periodic magazine. Famicom Tsūshin (Note: Japanese: ファミコン通信; lit. "Famicom News") was a column in Login, focused on the Famicom platform, and ran from March 1985 to December 1986 issue. It received a good reception, so the publisher decided to found the magazine specialized for it.

The first issue of Famitsu was published on June 6, 1986, as Famicom Tsūshin. It sold less than 200,000 copies, despite 700,000 copies printed. The major competitor was Family Computer Magazine launched in July 1985 by Tokuma Shoten. Famitsu's editor found many readers had multiple game consoles, and they thought it would be better if the magazine covered various platforms. Increasing contents and the page count gradually, the magazine was published three times per month instead of semimonthly publication. On July 19, 1991 (issue #136) the magazine was renamed to Shūkan Famicom Tsūshin (Note: Japanese: 週刊ファミコン通信; lit. "Weekly Famicom News") and issues were published weekly thereafter. Alongside the weekly magazine, a monthly version called Gekkan Famicom Tsūshin (Note: Japanese: 月刊ファミコン通信; lit. "Monthly Famicom News") was also published.

Hirokazu Hamamura, an editor-in-chief (1992–2002), felt the beginning of a new era when he saw a private demonstration of Final Fantasy VI in 1993. He thought the name Famicom Tsūshin should be refurbished. At the start of 1996 (with issue #369) the magazines underwent another name change, truncating their titles to Shūkan Famitsū (Note: Japanese: 週刊ファミ通; lit. "Weekly Famitsū") and Gekkan Famitsū. (Note: Japanese: 月刊ファミ通) The name Famitsu had already been in common use.

The magazine was published by ASCII from its founding through March 2000 when it was transferred to Enterbrain, which published it for 13 years, until their parent company Kadokawa published it from 2013 to 2017. Since 2017, Kadokawa's subsidiary Gzbrain has been publishing the magazine, while in 2019 the company changed its name to Kadokawa Game Linkage.

== Content ==
As of 2024, Famitsu primarily covers recently released and upcoming video games.

=== Cross Review ===
Cross Review (Note: Japanese: クロスレビュー; lit. "Cross Review") is the magazine's signature review feature, introduced in the 31 October 1986 issue as a successor to the "SOFT Weather Forecast" section. Four reviewers each score a game out of 10, producing a combined score out of 40. Games scoring 30 points or higher receive Hall of Fame status, divided into Silver (30–31 points), Gold (32–34 points), and Platinum (35–40 points).

The feature has been influential among Japanese video game magazines, although it has also received criticism regarding the objectivity of its review scores. The first game to receive a perfect score was The Legend of Zelda: Ocarina of Time.

A reader-submitted version, Reader Cross Review (Note: 読者のクロスレビュー; lit. "Readers' Cross Review"), was introduced in 1988.

=== Famitsu Top 30 ===
Originally titled Famicom Tsūshin Top 30 (Note: ファミコン通信TOP30; lit. "Famicom News Top 30"), this weekly chart ranks the 30 best-selling console games in Japan using retail sales estimates. Because the figures are based on samples from participating retailers, they may differ from estimates published by other market research companies. Famitsu sales data are frequently cited by Japanese news media.

=== Regular features ===
Other recurring sections include:

- Marketing Report (Note: マーケティングリポート; lit. "Marketing Report") – analysis of the video game industry based on sales data and industry commentary.
- Famitsu Chōnaikai (Note: ファミ通町内会; lit. "Famitsu Neighborhood Association") – the magazine's long-running reader submission section.
- LETTERS Dengo-ban (Note: LETTERS伝言板; lit. "LETTERS Message Board") – a letters column in which editors respond to readers using fictional personas.
- Otahaku (Note: おた博; lit. "Otaku Exhibition") – a reader correspondence section.
- Famitsūhan (Note: ファミ通販; lit. "Famitsu Mail Order") – a merchandise and mail-order section.
- Totteoki Indie (Note: とっておきインディー; lit. "Special Indie Selection") – coverage of independent video games.
- Arcade Archives (Note: アーケードアーカイブス; lit. "Arcade Archives") – coverage of Hamster Corporation's arcade game re-releases and related hardware features.
- Latest Game Check Sheet (Note: 最新ゲームチェックシート; lit. "Latest Game Check Sheet") – summaries of newly released and upcoming games.
- Entamikusu (Note: エンタミクス; lit. "Entertainment Mix") – coverage of entertainment outside video games, including films, television, and music.
- Famitsu Express (Note: ファミ通エクスプレス; lit. "Famitsu Express") – video game industry news, formerly including the long-running Face interview series.

== Shūkan Famitsū and Gekkan Famitsū ==
Famicom Tsūshin initially focused on the Famicom platform, but later it featured multi-platform coverage. Famicom Tsūshin was renamed to Famitsu in 1995. Shūkan Famitsū is a weekly publication concentrating on video game news and reviews, and is published every Thursday with a circulation of 500,000 per issue. Gekkan Famitsū is published monthly.

=== Necky the Fox ===
Famitsu covers alternately feature pop idols or actresses on even-numbered issues and the Famitsu mascot, Necky (Note: Japanese: ネッキー, Hepburn: Nekkī) the Fox in odd-numbered issues. Year-end and special editions all feature Necky dressed as popular contemporary video game characters. Necky is the cartoon creation of artist Susumu Matsushita, and he takes the form of a costumed fox. The costumes worn by Necky reflect current popular video games. Necky's name was chosen according to a reader poll, and it derives from a complex Japanese pun: "Necky" is actually the reverse of the Japanese word for fox, キツネ, (Note: Japanese: kitsune) and his original connection to Famicom Tsūshin is intended to evoke the bark of the fox, the Japanese onomatopoeia of which is コンコン. (Note: Japanese: "kon kon") Necky makes a cameo appearance in Super Mario Maker.

== Special-topic Famitsu publications ==
Over the course of its history, Famitsu has published numerous spin-off magazines devoted to particular gaming platforms, genres and areas of entertainment. Most have since been discontinued as coverage shifted toward Weekly Famitsu and Famitsu.com.

=== General entertainment ===
- Entamix (Note: Japanese: エンタミクス) (previously Otonafami (Note: Japanese: オトナファミ)) was a monthly general entertainment magazine aimed at adult readers, covering films, television, manga, anime, games and other popular culture. It was launched in July 2006 as Otonafami, renamed Entamix in 2014, and discontinued with its May 2017 issue.

=== Platform-specific magazines ===
- Famitsū DC (Note: Japanese: ファミ通DC) was dedicated to the Dreamcast and served as Sega's official magazine while Enterbrain was a subsidiary of CSK Holdings and Sega. It succeeded earlier Sega-focused titles, including Sega Saturn Tsūshin.
- Famitsū PSP+PS3 (Note: Japanese: ファミ通PSP+PS3) was devoted to the PlayStation 2, PlayStation 3 and PlayStation Portable. It originated as PlayStation Tsūshin, before being renamed Famitsū PS, Famitsū PS2, Famitsū PLAYSTATION+, and finally Famitsū PSP+PS3 in 2008. Its final issue was published in May 2010.
- Famitsū DS+Wii (Note: Japanese: ファミ通DS+Wii) covered Nintendo platforms. It was originally published under several titles, including Famitsū 64 and Famitsū Cube, with its name changing to reflect Nintendo's current hardware. It adopted the DS branding in 2006, became Famitsū DS+Wii later that year, and ceased publication with the March 2016 issue.
- Famitsū Xbox (Note: Japanese: ファミ通Xbox) (later Famitsū Xbox 360 (Note: ファミ通Xbox360)) was Japan's only magazine dedicated exclusively to the Xbox platform. Founded primarily by former Famitsū DC staff, it entered indefinite hiatus in 2013.

=== Genre-specific magazines ===
- Famitsū Connect! On (Note: Japanese: ファミ通コネクト!オン) was a monthly magazine dedicated to online games. It ran from 2006 until entering indefinite hiatus in 2015.
- Famitsū Mobage (Note: Japanese: ファミ通Mobage) and Famitsū GREE (Note: Japanese: ファミ通GREE) were companion magazines devoted to social games on the Mobage and GREE platforms, respectively. Both were launched in 2011 and entered indefinite hiatus following their August 2013 issues.
- Famitsū Sister. (Note: Japanese: ファミ通Sister.) was a special magazine devoted to bishōjo games, published as special issues in 1995 and 1997. Its editorial focus later evolved into DearMy..., which was subsequently succeeded by Famitsū Characters DVD.

=== Comics and manga ===
- Famitsū Bros. (Note: Japanese: ファミ通ブロス) began publication in 1993 as Bessatsu Famicom Tsūshin: Strategy Special, a strategy guide magazine aimed at younger readers. It later became a comic magazine for elementary and junior high school students before ceasing publication in September 2002.
- Famitsū Comic (Note: Japanese: ファミ通コミック) was a manga magazine first published around 1992. It is unrelated to the later Fami2 Comic supplement included with Famitsū DS+Wii.
- Famicomi (Note: Japanese: ファミコミ) was a quarterly manga anthology first published in 1994. Following its discontinuation in 1995, its editorial line was succeeded by Comic Beam.

=== Other publications ===
- Satellaview Tsūshin (Note: Japanese: サテラビュー通信) was a monthly magazine dedicated to the Satellaview. It published twelve issues between 1995 and 1996 and combined game coverage with satellite broadcasting schedules and radio programme listings.
- Virtual Boy Tsūshin (Note: Japanese: バーチャルボーイ通信) was a special issue devoted to the Virtual Boy, published in 1995.
- Famitsū Wave DVD (Note: Japanese: ファミ通WaveDVD) (previously GameWave DVD) was a video game magazine packaged with a DVD containing trailers, gameplay footage, interviews and coverage of Famitsū events. It ceased publication with the May 2011 issue.

== Scoring ==
Video games are graded in Famitsu via a review system of having four critics each assign the game a score from 0 to 10, with 10 being the highest score. The scores are then added together. As of 2024, thirty games have received perfect scores of 40 from Famitsu. The console with the highest number of perfect-scoring games is the PlayStation 3, with seven total. Four of the perfect-scoring games on PlayStation 3 were also released on the Xbox 360, which is tied with the Wii for the second-highest number of perfect scores at five total. Franchises with multiple perfect score winners include The Legend of Zelda with five titles, Metal Gear with three titles, and Final Fantasy with two titles. The most recent game to receive a perfect score is Like a Dragon: Infinite Wealth.

As of 2023, all but three games with perfect scores are from Japanese companies, ten being published/developed by Nintendo, four by Square Enix, three by Sega, three by Konami and one by Capcom. As of 2023, the only three completely foreign games to achieve a perfect score are The Elder Scrolls V: Skyrim by Bethesda Softworks, Grand Theft Auto V by Rockstar Games, and Ghost of Tsushima by Sucker Punch Productions. Other foreign games that have achieved near-perfect scores are Grand Theft Auto IV, Red Dead Redemption, L.A. Noire, and Red Dead Redemption 2, all by Rockstar Games; Call of Duty: Modern Warfare 2, Call of Duty: Black Ops, and Call of Duty: Modern Warfare 3, all by Activision (but published by Square Enix in Japan); Gears of War 3 by Epic Games; and The Last of Us Part II and Uncharted 4: A Thief's End by Naughty Dog. Kingdom Hearts II, another game with a near-perfect score, was a joint effort between Japanese developer Square Enix and American developer Disney Interactive Studios.

== Awards ==
Famitsu administers the Famitsu awards. Video games receive a number of different awards in categories like Innovation, Biggest Hit, Rookie Award, Highest Quality, etc. One or two "Game of the Year" awards are granted as the top prize. Top prize winners are determined by a combination of critical and fan review scores as well as sales figures.

== Relationship with other magazines ==
UK trade magazine MCV and Famitsu have an exclusive partnership which sees news and content from each magazine appear in the other.

== See also ==
- Enterbrain
- Famitsu Bunko
- Famitsu scores
- Sinclair User, another early magazine
