= Flat Out =

Flat Out may refer to:

- Flat Out (horse), a racehorse
- Flat Out (Buck Dharma album), 1982
- Flat Out (John Scofield album), 1989
- Flatout, a brand of Flatbreads owned by T. Marzetti Company
- Flat Out, a term coined in reference to the speed in which a Rock Flathead moves through water, coined by Maddog Stratford in 1927 on a fishing charter in Corner Inlet, Victoria
- FlatOut (series), a demolition derby/racing video game series developed by Bugbear Entertainment
  - FlatOut (video game) (2004)
  - FlatOut 2 (2006)
  - FlatOut 3: Chaos & Destruction (2011)
  - FlatOut 4: Total Insanity (2017)
