= No Connection (band) =

- Origin: Reading, Berkshire, England
- Genre: Rock
- Years active: 1997-2018
- Label: No Connection Music
- Members: Graham Young; Simon Whenlock; Jon Hill
- Website: http://www.noconnectionmusic.com/

No Connection were an English classic rock music group based in Reading, Berkshire.

== History ==
No Connection were formed in May 1997 in Reading, Berkshire by Graham Young (lead vocals, guitar), Simon Whenlock (bass, backing vocals), and Jon Hill (drums, backing vocals). The group claims as their inspirations the likes of Aerosmith, AC/DC, Deep Purple, George Michael, Public Enemy, Queen, The Cult, Van Halen, and U2.

No Connection released their first album, titled Justified, in January 2000. The album included ten songs, including "Victory Girl", which was featured in the teaser of an episode of First Wave titled "Ohio Players". Two more songs off the album—"Ain't Foolin'" and "Love for Free"—reached No. 1 on MP3.com's Classic Rock chart.

The band released Deal With It, co-produced with John Mitchell, in 2001 through their indie record label No Connection Music. In October 2002, the group toured the United States, performing in Philadelphia, New Jersey, and New York City (including at the CBGB club). They also subsequently performed in the Czech Republic and Poland in 2005, and in Lithuania in 2006.

In 2004, No Connection released Love To Hate To Love, followed in 2005 by Feed The Machine and in 2008 by Red Light Fever.

No Connection's music has been featured in two games of the FlatOut video game series: three songs—"Burnin'", "Living American", and "Love to Hate to Love"—were included in the original game (see FlatOut (video game)) and two songs—"The Last Revolution" and "Feed the Machine"—were present in FlatOut: Ultimate Carnage.

The status of the band is unknown as in 2018 Graham Young announced that he was leaving the band.

Graham Young is performing as The Martian Pariah.

Simon Whenlock has many musical projects such as Fire Cherry, Drift Road and performing as a solo artist.

== Discography ==
- Justified (2000)
- Deal With It (2001)
- Love To Hate To Love (2004)
- Feed The Machine (2005)
- Red Light Fever (2008)
- Tal Es La Vida (2010)
- The Best And The Rest (2011)
- The Lithuanian Incident (2014)
- Suck It Up (2018)
