= List of video games set in New York City =

This article lists computer and video games in which a major part of the action takes place in New York City or a fictional city closely based on it.

== List of games which feature New York City ==
Title	Year	Platform(s)	Notes
007 Racing	2000	PS	Several missions take place in the city.
18 Wheeler: American Pro Trucker	1999	Arcade/Dreamcast/GameCube/PS2	
18 Wheels of Steel series		PC	
25 To Life	2006	PC/PS2/Xbox	
50 Cent: Bulletproof	2005	PS2/Xbox	
Alone in the Dark	2008	PC/PS2/PS3/Wii/Xbox 360	
Assassin's Creed III	2012	PC/PS3/Wii U/Xbox 360	During the 18th century, Desmond Miles' ancestor, the Mohawk Assassin Ratonhnhaké:ton, visited the city.
Assassin's Creed Rogue	2014	PC/PS3/Xbox 360	During the Seven Years' War, Assassin-turned-Templar Shay Cormac visited the city.
Battlefield 3	2011	PC/PS3/Xbox 360	
Battlefield 6	2025	PC/PS5/Xbox Series X/S	
BioShock Infinite	2013	PC/PS3/Xbox 360	Game's protagionist Booker DeWitt lives in his office on the Bowery, which appears several times; Manhattan scenery is shown two times.
BMX XXX	2002	Xbox/PS2	First level is set in The Bronx.
Call of Duty: Modern Warfare 3	2011	PC/PS3/Xbox 360	Set in the near future, with at least two levels involving open warfare in the city, specifically Lower Manhattan.
Call of Duty Modern Warfare 4	2026	Nintendo Switch 2/PS5/Windows/Xbox Series X	One of the settings in the game is Times Square.
Command & Conquer: Red Alert 2	2000	PC	Featured in the first Allied campaign and the third Soviet campaign missions, as well as a multiplayer/skirmish map.
Command & Conquer: Red Alert 3	2008	PC/PS3/Xbox 360	Featured in the final Soviet mission.
Control	2019	PC/PlayStation 4/Windows/Xbox One/Nintendo Switch/PlayStation 5/Xbox Series X/S/Stadia/macOS/iOS/iPadOS/visionOS	Set within The Oldest House Located on 34th Thomas St Manhattan New York City, New York.
Control Resonant	2026	MacOS/PC/PS5/Xbox Series X/S/Windows	
Cruis'n World	1996	Arcade/N64	
Crysis 2	2011	PC/PS3/Xbox 360	Future post-apocalyptic version of New York.
Crysis 3	2013	PC/PS3/Xbox 360	Future post-apocalyptic version of New York.
CSI: NY	2008	PC	
The Darkness	2007	PS3/Xbox 360	
The Darkness II	2012	PC/PS3/Xbox 360	
Deadlock	2024	PC	
Deep Down	2015	PS4	Set in New York in 2094.
Def Jam Vendetta	2003	PS2/GameCube	
Def Jam: Fight for NY	2004	GameCube/PS2/Xbox	
Def Jam Fight for NY: The Takeover	2006	PSP	
Deus Ex	2000	Mac/PC/PS2	A futuristic New York set in the 2050s which features Battery Park, Hell's Kitchen, and Liberty Island. The game even predicted the September 11 attacks by removing the World Trade Center from the background (due to data issues), claiming they were destroyed by terrorists.
Die Hard Trilogy	1996	PC/PS/Saturn	The third part Die Hard: With a Vengeance, like the film of the same name, was set in New York.
Disney Infinity 2.0	2014	Android/iOS/PC/PS3/PS4/PS Vita/Wii U/Xbox 360/Xbox One	
Driver aka. Driver: You Are the Wheelman	1999	GBC/Mac/PC/PS	Features New York as the final stage alongside Miami, San Francisco, and Los Angeles.
Driver: Parallel Lines	2006	PC/PS2/Wii/Xbox	Takes place in 1978 and present day 2006 New York City, including all the boroughs except Staten Island and parts of the New Jersey shore.
Driver 76	2007	PSP	Takes place in 1976 New York City, including all the boroughs except Staten Island and parts of the New Jersey shore.
Duke Nukem: Manhattan Project	2002	PC	
Duke Nukem: Zero Hour	1999	N64	
Enslaved: Odyssey to the West	2010	PlayStation 3/Xbox 360	Future post-apocalyptic version of New York.
Fahrenheit aka. Indigo Prophecy	2005	PC/PS2/Xbox	
Fantastic Four	2005	GBA/GameCube/PS2/Windows/Xbox	
Fighting Force	1997	N64/PC/PlayStation	Famous New York City Landmarks such as the World Trade Center can be seen in The Background. Areas such as The Bronx and Central Park are also in Playable levels.
Final Fight	1989		
Forza Motorsport 2	2007	Xbox 360	
Forza Motorsport 3	2009	Xbox 360	
Freedom Fighters	2003	GameCube/PC/PS2/Xbox	
Front Mission Evolved	2010	PC/PS3/Xbox 360	
Gargoyles	1995	Sega Genesis	
Ghostbusters video games			Features NYC's Natural History Museum, the New York Public Library, and Central Park.
The Godfather: The Game	2007	PC/PS2/PS3/PSP/Wii/Xbox/Xbox 360	Taking place in New York from 1945 to 1955.
The Godfather II	2009	PC/PS3/Xbox 360	Takes place in the late 1950s and early 1960s in New York City, Miami, and Havana, Cuba.
Godzilla: Save the Earth	2004	PS2/Xbox	
Godzilla: Unleashed	2007	PS2/Wii	
Gran Turismo 4	2004	PS2	Features New York as a race track.
Gunblade NY Sega Arcade			
Home Alone 2: Lost in New York	1992	Game Boy/Sega Genesis/MS-DOS/NES/SNES	
I Am Alive	2012	PC/PS3/Xbox 360	
The Incredible Hulk	2008	DS/PC/PS2/PS3/Wii/Xbox 360	
Indiana Jones and the Fate of Atlantis	1992	MS-DOS/Wii	
Later Alligator	2019	PC/Nintendo Switch	Set in the parodical "Alligator New York City"
Left Behind: Eternal Forces	2006	PC	Set in an unspecified "near-future" time after the biblical Rapture.
Left Behind: Tribulation Forces	2008	PC	
Left Behind 3: Rise of the Antichrist			
Legendary	2008	PC/PS3/Xbox 360	
Lego Marvel's Avengers	2016	3DS/PC/PS3/PS4/PSVita/Wii U/Xbox 360/Xbox One	Includes the fictional Stark/Avengers Tower.
Lego Marvel Super Heroes	2013	DS/3DS/PC/PS3/PS4/PSVita/Wii U/Xbox 360/Xbox One	Includes landmarks such as Grand Central Station, Empire State Building, Statue of Liberty and Central Park, and the fictional Baxter Building, Daily Bugle, Oscorp, The Raft, and Stark Tower, Times Square.
Manhattan Chase	2005	PC	
Manhunter: New York	1988	PC	
Marvel vs. Capcom: Infinite	2017	PC/PS4/Xbox One	In the game's story, New York City is merged with Metro City from Final Fight to become "New Metro City".
Mario Bros.	1983	Arcade	Takes place in the sewers of New York City.
Mario Kart Tour	2019	Android/iOS	There are 4 race tracks set in New York City, under the title "New York Minute" 1 through 4.
Max Payne	2001	GBA/Mac/PC/PS2/Xbox	
Max Payne 2: The Fall of Max Payne	2003	PC/PS2/Xbox	
Metal Gear Solid 2: Sons of Liberty	2001	PC/PS2/Xbox	Most of the game is set on the Hudson River; the final fight is set atop Federal Hall National Memorial.
Mickey's Speedway USA	2000	N64	Features New York City as a race track.
Midnight Club: Street Racing	2000	GBA/PS2	
Mike Tyson's Punch-Out	1987	NES	Where Little Mac trains betweens fights
Mortal Kombat 3 and Ultimate Mortal Kombat 3	1995	Arcade/Game Boy/Game Gear/Genesis/Mega Drive/PC/PS1/Saturn/SNES	
Mortal Kombat	2011	PS3/PSVita/Windows/Xbox 360	
Mystery P.I.: The New York Fortune		PC	
NBA Street Vol. 2	2003	GameCube/PS2/Xbox	
N.Y.C. The Big Apple aka. New York City	1984	Atari 8-bit/C64	by Russ Segal, Synapse Software, 1984.
New York Nights: Success in the City	2005	iPhone/iPod touch	Social simulation game developed by Gameloft
News Tower	2025	Linux/macOS/Windows	newspaper management simulation
Outlaw Golf 2	2004	PS2/Xbox	Features a fictitious golf course in Central Park.
Parasite Eve	1998	PS	Including an extensive secret level set in a heavily infested Chrysler Building.
Peter Jackson's King Kong: The Official Game of the Movie	2005	GBA/GameCube/NDS/PS2/PSP/Windows/Xbox/Xbox 360	Features New York in the 1930s, including Empire State Building.
Pilotwings	1990	SNES	The "Little States" level features small-scale versions of multiple American cities and landmarks, including New York City.
Project Gotham Racing	2001	Xbox	Features many cities with New York as one of them.
Project Gotham Racing 3	2005	Xbox 360	
Prototype	2009	PC/PS3/Xbox 360	The events take place on Manhattan Island.
Prototype 2	2012	PC/PS3/Xbox 360	Fourteen months having passed, the city is now known as New York Zero. The city is split up into three zones.
Resistance 3	2011	PS3	
Resistance: Burning Skies	2012	PS Vita	
S.C.A.T.: Special Cybernetic Attack Team	1991	NES	
Second Sight	2004/2005	GameCube/PC/PS2/Xbox	
Shadow Dancer: The Secret of Shinobi	1990	Genesis	Part of the Shinobi series. Set in a dystopian New York where evil ninjas overrun the city.
Shiei no Sona-Nyl: What a Beautiful Memories	2010	PC/PSP	The game is set in an alternate-universe version of Manhattan in 1907 which has been deserted and quarantined after an unexplained disaster called the “great disappearance” 5 years prior to the game's events.
Sin and Punishment	2000	N64/Wii (Virtual Console)	Achi then places Airan in a dream-like state where she imagines she is on a subway in Long Island New York, ten years in the future.
Sin & Punishment: Star Successor	2010	Wii	A flashback shows that the game's main protagonist, Isa Jo, was present when his father Saki attacked New York City.
Smashing Drive	2000	Arcade/GameCube/Xbox/GBA	
Soldier of Fortune	2000	Dreamcast/PS2/Windows	
Spawn: Armageddon	2003	GameCube/PS2/Xbox	
Spider-Man video games	Various Years	Atari 2600/Amstrad CPC, Apple II/C-64/C-16/Atari 8-bit/ZX Spectrum/PC/MS-DOS/Amiga/Atari ST/Genesis/Mega-CD/GB/NES/Sega Master System/Game Gear/Arcade/SNES/32X/PS/N64/GBC/WIN/DreamCast/PS2/GameCube/Xbox/GBA/N-Gage/Mac OS X/NDS/PSP/Wii/Xbox 360/iOS/Android OS/Wii U/PS Vita/N3DS/PS4/PS5/Xbox One/Windows Phone 8/Blackberry 10	
Street Fighter III: Third Strike	1999	Arcade/Dreamcast/PS2/Xbox	Multiple stages in the game are set in New York City, most prominently those of Alex, a New York native.
Syphon Filter	1999	PS	
Syphon Filter 2	2000	PS	
Teenage Mutant Ninja Turtles video games			
Tekken 2	1997	PS	The character, Paul Phoenix, had a stage which was set in New York.
Tom Clancy's The Division	2016	PC/PS4/Xbox One	Mid-crisis version of New York as a playground for online multiplayer matches. It features many New York landmarks.
Tom Clancy's The Division 2	2019	PC/PS4/Xbox One	Episode 3 DLC and Warlord of New York expansion are set in New York City.
Tom Clancy's Splinter Cell: Double Agent	2005	GameCube/PC/PS2/PS3/Wii/Xbox/Xbox 360	
Tony Hawk's Pro Skater	1999	Dreamcast/Nintendo 64/PlayStation	A level is set in a mall in New York.
Tony Hawk's Pro Skater 2	2000	Dreamcast/iOS/Mac/Nintendo 64/PC/PlayStation/Xbox	
Tony Hawk's Underground	2003	GameCube/PC/PS2/Xbox	Manhattan is a playable level in the game.
Top Spin	2003	PC/PS2/Xbox	Includes a tennis tournament in New York.
True Crime: New York City	2005	GameCube/PC/PS2/Xbox	Noteworthy for featuring a street-accurate recreation of Manhattan with many landmarks as well as the ability to use the New York City Subway and taxis to get around the island. Bridges such as the Brooklyn Bridge are present but are blocked off.
Turning Point: Fall of Liberty	2008	PC/PS3/Xbox 360	Starts in the city when the Nazis attack the Eastern US Coast (set 1940-1953)
Twisted Metal 2	1996	PlayStation	Features a stage taking place on the rooftops of skyscrapers in NYC, some of which can be entered.
Tycoon City: New York	2006	PC	A city-building game where players are tasked with developing Manhattan.
Ultimate Marvel vs. Capcom 3	2011	PS3/PSVita/Xbox 360	Some stages are set near famous NYC landmarks such as The Statue of Liberty and Manhattan Island.
US Racer		PC	
Vampire: The Masquerade – Redemption	2000	PC	
The Warriors	2005	PS2/PSP/Xbox	Set in Coney Island and Tremont.
The Wolf Among Us	2014	Android/iOS/Mac/PC/PS3/PS4/PS Vita/Wii U/Xbox 360/Xbox One	Set in the fictional borough, Fabletown.
Wolfenstein II: The New Colossus	2017-2018	Nintendo Switch/PC/PS4/Xbox One	
World in Conflict	2007	PC	A RTS where USSR begins an invasion on US soil starting by attacking New York and taking the Liberty statue.
World of Subways Vol. 1	2008	PC	A subway driver simulator which takes place in the underground of New York City and New Jersey.
World of Subways Vol. 4	2015	PC	A subway driver simulator in which the player drives 7 Line Train in the 1980s.
XIII	2003	GameCube/Mac/PC/PS2/Xbox	
Yo! Noid	1990	NES	

== List of games which feature a fictional city closely based on New York City ==
- Ace Combat 6: Fires of Liberation (Xbox 360) is set in Gracemeria, based on New York City.
- Batman: Arkham Knight (Windows, PS4, Xbox One) is set in Gotham City, which is roughly based on New York City: for example, it includes the Lady of Gotham which resembles the Statue of Liberty
- Crazy Taxi 2 (Dreamcast) contains two cities, "Around Apple" and "Small Apple", which are both somewhat based on New York City. The latter is also included in Crazy Taxi 3: High Roller.
- EarthBound (SNES) has a city called Fourside, which is also referred as the Big Banana; a parody of New York's nickname, the Big Apple.
- While the final version of Final Fantasy VII (PlayStation) does not feature anything that resembles New York City specifically, the initial concept was supposed to take place in New York City, and the idea of a realistic setting stuck in the final game.
- The Final Fight series is set in a fictional city called Metro City, which features areas based on New York City. Metro City also appears in Marvel vs. Capcom 3 and several entries in the Street Fighter series.
- Futurama (PS2, Xbox), which is set in "New New York"
- Various games in the Grand Theft Auto series set in Liberty City, a New York City look-alike.
  - Grand Theft Auto (PC, PS, GBC)
  - Grand Theft Auto III (Windows, PS2, Xbox)
  - Grand Theft Auto Advance (GBA)
  - Grand Theft Auto: San Andreas (Windows, PlayStation 2, Xbox), featured one mission in Liberty City
  - Grand Theft Auto: Liberty City Stories (PlayStation 2, PSP)
  - Grand Theft Auto IV (Windows, PS3, Xbox 360)
  - GTA IV: The Lost and Damned (Windows, Xbox 360, PS3)
  - GTA IV: The Ballad of Gay Tony (Windows, Xbox 360, PS3)
  - Grand Theft Auto: Chinatown Wars (Nintendo DS, PSP)
- inFamous (PS3) is set in Empire City, based on New York City.
- Kingpin: Life of Crime (Windows, Linux) is set in Radio City, a city that resembles New York City in the art-deco era
- Mafia II (Windows, PlayStation 3, PlayStation 4, Xbox 360, Xbox One), set in Empire Bay, a representation of New York City in the mid 1940s and early 1950s. Promotional material and the game itself also specify that Empire Bay is in the state of New York.
- Mother 3 (GBA) features a city known as New Pork City. This city is also featured as a stage in Super Smash Bros. Brawl.
- Pokémon Black and White and its sequels (DS) are set in the Unova region, modeled after New York City.
- The Sonic the Hedgehog series features many cities based on New York City, such as Empire City in Sonic Unleashed.
- Streets of Rage is set in Wood Oak City, based on New York City; many prominent New York City landmarks, such as the World Trade Center, are visible throughout the game and on the European Mega Drive cover of Streets of Rage 3
- Super Mario Odyssey (Nintendo Switch) features New Donk City that is based on New York, with a building resembling the Flatiron Building and a building resembling the Empire State Building as the city hall (called New Donk City Hall Plaza), and in the background a building resembling the Chrysler Building and a bridge resembling the Brooklyn Bridge. Like Fourside, it is called the Big Banana.

== See also ==
- Culture of New York City
- Media in New York City

== Other city video game lists ==
- List of fiction set in Chicago
- List of video games set in London
