= Super street =

Super street may refer to:

- Super Street, an import automotive magazine, published by Source Interlink.
  - Super Street: The Game, a racing video game based on this magazine. Published by Lion Castle Entertainment.
- Superstreet, a type of road intersection which is a variation of the Michigan left.
