= Street Outlaws =

2013 Television Series

- Genre: Reality
- Country of origin: United States
- Original language: English
- No. of seasons: 14
- No. of episodes: 105

Production
- Running time: 41 minutes
- Production company: Pilgrim Studios

Original release
- Network: Discovery Channel
- Release: June 10, 2013 – May 13, 2019

Street Outlaws is an American reality television series. The series premiered on Discovery Channel on June 10, 2013. The show has 15 seasons in total.

== Episodes ==
=== Series overview ===
Season	Episodes	Originally released	
Season	Episodes	First released	Last released
1	8	June 10, 2013	July 29, 2013
2	8	December 1, 2013	January 13, 2014
3	8	June 23, 2014	August 4, 2014
4	10	December 29, 2014	March 2, 2015
5	11	May 18, 2015	July 27, 2015
6	9	October 26, 2015	December 6, 2015
7	11	April 25, 2016	June 20, 2016
8	11	October 31, 2016	January 2, 2017
9	14	March 13, 2017	June 5, 2017
10	15	March 7, 2018	April 25, 2018
11	18	May 21, 2018	September 10, 2018
12	21	January 1, 2019	March 18, 2019
13	9	March 25, 2019	May 13, 2019

=== Season 1 (2013) ===
No. overall	No. in season	Title	Original release date	US viewers (millions)
1	1	"Midnight Riders"	June 10, 2013	N/A
In the series premiere, Chuck (#7) calls out Flip (#6) for his spot on the Oklahoma street racing list. Murder Nova (#1), Big Chief (Race Organizer), and Flip decide to impersonate security guards and prank Chuck with a fake bust as he street tests his car. Meanwhile, Brandon (unranked) calls out Farmtruck(#10) to try to break onto the list. When race day comes, tensions run high and fights break out that leave shockwaves throughout this racing community.
2	2	"Young and Old Blood"	June 17, 2013	N/A
Local racing legend Varley (#9) is devastated when he is told he must quit street racing. After a fight, Chuck begs Big Chief to coach him back up the list but while street testing his car, Chuck is surprised when he is swarmed by cops.
3	3	"King of the Streets"	June 24, 2013	N/A
After three years of taunting, Doc (#2) calls out Murder Nova (#1) to race for the crown. Farmtruck (#10) and AZN prepare for their list race against Varley (#9) by hustling street races with randoms on local highways.
4	4	"Murder the Nova"	July 1, 2013	N/A
While preparing to race Doc (#2), Murder Nova (#1) does a test hit on the street that draws the attention of the local authorities. Team Varley (#9) and Farmtruck (#10) scramble to get their cars ready to rematch.
5	5	"Stand Your Ground"	July 8, 2013	N/A
Chuck (#7) and Flip's (#6) smack talk at a poker tournament leads to another call out. Monza (#4) calls out groom-to-be Daddy Dave (#3) for his spot but days before his wedding, Daddy Dave's test-hits signal the boys in blue.
6	6	"Racer's Revenge"	July 15, 2013	N/A
Doc (#1) and Shawn (#2) face each other in a rematch for the Crown of Oklahoma's fastest street car. Derek calls out Farmtruck (#10) and tries to get back on the list, but during a late night testing session, Derek gets a visit from some familiar cops.
7	7	"Last Car Standing"	July 22, 2013	N/A
The rivalry between Daddy Dave (#2) and Shawn (#1) comes to a head when Dave calls out Shawn for the #1 spot. Fresh off his win against Farmtruck (unranked) and cocky as ever, newcomer Derek (#10) challenges Varley (#9).
8	8	"Interstate Showdown"	July 29, 2013	N/A
The Red River Rivalry gets renewed in a battle between Texas vs. Oklahoma drivers. The winner lays claim to being the fastest state in the country. Meanwhile, Farmtruck and AZN take a road trip of their own into Texas to do some good old fashion 'fishing.'

=== Season 2 (2013–14) ===
No. overall	No. in season	Title	Original release date	US viewers (millions)
9	1	"Lonestar Smackdown"	December 1, 2013	N/A
In the season premiere, Farmtruck and AZN must face-off against one of four newbie racers who want to get on the top ten list. Big Chief gets a callout via an online video from a Texas race club who think they can take on the 405's best. Old state rivalries lead to big brawls when Texas racers LMR want to change the rules on the OKC guys.
10	2	"Midwest Fireworks"	December 9, 2013	N/A
Big Chief strikes a deal with loudmouth racer Freakin' Rican, allowing him to call out (#10) Farmtruck in exchange for bootleg fireworks. There is a shakeup in the middle of the list when (#8) Derek gets called out by newcomer (#9) Andrade and (#6) Chuck gets called out by (#7) Varley. Big Chief, Murder Nova, and Chuck spy on a Varley test hit but when the Gold Car veers off the road, things go terribly wrong.
11	3	"Sonoma Mr. Nice Guy"	December 16, 2013	N/A
After an expensive overhaul of his car, (#2) Murder Nova calls out (#1) Daddy Dave in an unforgettable rematch showdown. Freakin' Rican finally gets his shot when he calls out (#10) Farmtruck, but an AZN joyride jeopardizes the Farmtruck's gatekeeper standing.
12	4	"Fastest Chick in OKC"	December 23, 2013	N/A
Tina Pierce, known by locals to be the fastest female racer in Oklahoma, calls out (#10) Farmtruck. Old family rivalries come to a head when (#8) Varley and (#9) Andrade Jr. face-off while (#6) Chuck and (#7) Derek race for a $1000 and the #6 spot.
13	5	"Showdown Lowdown"	December 30, 2013	N/A
(#1) Daddy Dave and (#2) Murder Nova square off while best friends (#3) Doc and (#4) Monza battle on the street for the first time. After installing a secret weapon on his Monte Carlo, Doc is painfully reminded that testing on the street is very illegal.
14	6	"Drag Week"	January 6, 2014	N/A
With the help of some racing legends, Big Chief resurrects his first race car, a '72 Pontiac LeMans he calls The Crow. The OKC's top 3 take on some expert race car builders' best to hold their coveted title of "Fastest Street Cars in the Nation."
15	7	"Papa's Got a Brand New Bug"	January 6, 2014	N/A
AZN and Farmtruck build a Volkswagen bug race car to go out fishing with, but have a run-in with the local authorities. The top 3 on the list compete in a racing extravaganza. Big Chief re-introduces The Crow to the racers by calling out the #1 spot.
16	8	"Straight Out to Cali"	January 13, 2014	N/A
Crazy Kelly, along with his California racing cronies, call out OKC's best and fastest. The OKC crew bring their cars out to Compton for a showdown of pride and high stakes betting while AZN and Farmtruck head to Chicago to fish for races.

=== Season 3 (2014) ===
No. overall	No. in season	Title	Original release date	US viewers (millions)
17	1	"The Rise of the Crow"	June 23, 2014	N/A
Street Outlaws returns with Big Chief stepping down as racemaster to pursue the list in his twin turbo-charged Pontiac a.k.a. "The Crow". AZN, Farmtruck and the "Dungbeetle" have a run-in with police while testing. Varley's son/driver Tony quits, leaving the team high and dry. Tina drops off the list, leaving an opportunity for new racers and familiar faces to race-off round-robin style for the coveted #10 spot
18	2	"Go Back to Tulsa!"	June 30, 2014	N/A
Track racers from Tulsa, OKC's northern neighbor, call out the 405 with hopes of taking down the "fastest street-raced cars in the country." Farmtruck and AZN try to raise money with a junk-purged garage sale and both Murder Nova and Chuck upgrade to twin turbo in preparation for the races against the Tulsa guys.
19	3	"Top 5 List Shake-Up"	July 7, 2014	N/A
Current racemaster Farmtruck devises a plan to have the top 5 racers battle each other to shake up the top 10 list. AZN and Farmtruck fish for races with the Dung Beetle as Varley's son Shelby takes over the Gold Car driving duties and attempts to get them back on the list.
20	4	"The Mouthy Dirty South"	July 14, 2014	N/A
The smack talk gets spicy as OKC's best drive down to New Orleans to race The Big Easy's fastest street cars. Big Chief enlists his good friend Kamikaze to resurrect Flip's El Camino and Texas racer Boosted GT tries to convince Chief to give him a shot at the list.
21	5	"What's Up Doc?"	July 21, 2014	N/A
Doc is determined to make a comeback with the Street Beast. Big Chief and Kamikaze decide it's time for the El Camino to race for the list. Farmtruck and AZN go after redemption with an old rival with the Dung Beetle.
22	6	"Dallas Cash Days"	July 28, 2014	N/A
OKC racers take on the fastest of the south at the annual Cash Days race. While fishing for street races and fast cash, Farmtruck and AZN meet their match.
23	7	"Big Chief vs Murder Nova"	August 4, 2014	N/A
Big Chief calls out Murder Nova to take the number one spot from Daddy Dave; Kayla Morton and Boosted GT take a shot at the list; Farmtruck wants a new sleeper.
24	8	"It's Good to Be the Chief"	August 4, 2014	N/A
A sneak peek at the new season and a look back at lost moments, the best fights and omitted scenes and races.

=== Season 4 (2014–15) ===
No. overall	No. in season	Title	Original release date	US viewers (millions)
25	1	"Down from Chi-Town"	December 29, 2014	N/A
Trash-talking street racers from Chicago take on their Oklahoma City rivals; the Farmtruck reels in a Ferrari and a Camaro.
26	2	"Shut Your Death Trap"	January 5, 2015	N/A
Farmtruck and Chuck face off.
27	3	"Ova for Murder Nova?"	January 12, 2015	N/A
Shawn considers dropping off the list.
28	4	"Small Tire Shootout"	January 19, 2015	N/A
Spanish Chuck puts on a Small Tire Shootout, where cars with small tires race; Farmtruck and Azn attend a car show in Kansas; Shawn considers dropping off the list.
29	5	"Gatekeeper Gate"	January 26, 2015	N/A
Big Chief calls a second race night in one week to defuse rising tensions between racers who want a shot at the Top Ten List.
30	6	"Vocal Local Yokels"	February 3, 2015	N/A
A demolition derby is held while Farmtruck and AZN accepts an arrogant call out.
31	7	"Hearse and the Wichita Curse"	February 9, 2015	N/A
Big Chief is in Wichita, Kan. and racers take on Murder 56 and Superman.
32	8	"Let Them Eat Crow!"	February 16, 2015	N/A
As the season comes to a close, everybody makes one final push to move up on the list.
33	9	"The Southeast's Fastest: Part 1"	February 23, 2015	N/A
Sixteen of the fastest racers in the Southeast battle it out with their sights on winning a $16,000 prize.
34	10	"The Southeast's Fastest: Part 2"	March 2, 2015	N/A
The remaining racers see their reputations being tested as they battle it out for the cash prize.

=== Season 5 (2015) ===
No. overall	No. in season	Title	Original release date	US viewers (millions)
35	1	"Not So Big Easy"	May 18, 2015	N/A
Chief organises a nationwide call-out for a $50,000 pot and gets a new paint job, Kamikaze takes the El Camino off the list, and Farmtruck and AZN go fishing in Memphis.
36	2	"She's a Good Girl"	May 18, 2015	N/A
Chief confirms another driver for the nationwide call-out. Farmtruck and AZN play around with the Mad Scientist's new toy, a tri-powered trike.
37	3	"Small Tires, Big Dreams"	May 21, 2015	N/A
Boosted wants to be the first small tire car to crack the Top 5 on the List and make 405 History; Farmtruck is depressed from the death of Louise; Dave opens up a new shop and has a new racecar.
38	4	"Texas Grudge"	May 25, 2015	N/A
Boosted has set up Grudge Races down in Fort Worth, Texas and decides to hold a Grudge Race school to better prepare the 405 Farmtruck and AZN fish along the way.
39	5	"To Be 1 or Not to Be 1"	June 1, 2015	N/A
Big Chief gets a racer for the Nationwide Callout: Petey Smallblock New York, representing the Northeast. Doc takes on Big Chief for the top spot.
40	6	"Fear and Gloating in Las Vegas"	June 8, 2015	N/A
The 405 guys decide to hit Las Vegas to take on some of their fastest Street Racers. Farm truck and AZN dream of leaving their mark on Sin City.
41	7	"Angel City Danger"	June 15, 2015	N/A
The 405 guys head to California to take on smack talking street racers from Los Angeles. Meanwhile, Farmtruck and AZN take a trip to Hollywood.
42	8	"Round Robin Ridiculousness"	June 22, 2015	N/A
When Daddy Dave drops off the list leaves the 10 spot open. Big Chief decides to hold the largest round robin in 405 history to determine who is worthy.
43	9	"405 vs. Middle of 'Murica"	June 29, 2015	N/A
Racers from Colorado, Wyoming, Missouri and Kansas call out the 405. Kamikaze needs money. Farm truck and AZN prank Big Chief and Shawn.
44	10	"The Nationwide Call Out"	July 13, 2015	N/A
Farm truck and AZN pull a prank on Chief and Shawn to get back at them, and Big Chief's got a score to settle with his biggest rival, Kye Kelly.

=== Season 6 (2015) ===
No. overall	No. in season	Title	Original release date	US viewers (millions)
47	1	"When Life Gives You Lemons"	October 19, 2015	N/A
Farmtruck and AZN enter a 24 hour "Lemons Race" with an old Dodge Neon. The catch: They can only spend $500 to modify their lemon of a car for the race. Chief and Shawn take us through some of the greatest deleted races, the biggest emotional blow ups, and the craziest crashes in SO history. The other 405 drivers compete in some goofy lemon games of their own. It is fun, games, and of course, much racing, as lemon competitions commence and we look back at memorable moments from seasons past
48	2	"Kansas City Barbecue"	October 26, 2015	N/A
The 405 travels to Kansas City to accept a challenge of some smacktalking racers who think they have what it takes to claim \"fastest in the country.\" Farmtruck and AZN take on an elderly couple in a Hotrod with the Dung Beetle. Farmtruck, Kamikaze, Chuck, Boosted, Shane, Doc, and Monza get more they bargained for when they must race under rainy conditions. And after a devastating loss, the 405 plan to prove their claim of being the "nation's fastest" by hosting the biggest Cash Days event in history.
49	3	"No Rhino, No Cry"	November 2, 2015	N/A
The 405 List gets big shake-ups as everybody wants to move up, especially Dominator, who has often won recently. He wants back in the top 5 but must call out his buddy Derek to get the opportunity to race Boosted for the #5 spot. Only trouble is, he promised Derek that he'd help him fix his 3rd Gen Camaro, which feels like he's kicking Derek while he's down. AZN is fed up with new puppy Suzi's biting antics so Farmtruck gets a dog trainer to train AZN how to not behave around dogs. Kamikaze takes a crack at the #10 spot and gets into a confrontation with White Rhino at the starting line.
50	4	"Import This!"	November 9, 2015	N/A
The 405 gets an unusual callout from a bunch of mouthy racers with super fast import cars. Murder Nova, Chief, Chuck, Shane, Kamikaze and Boosted are in for a shock, when the ricer cars prove to be faster than anyone imagined. After being caught off guard by the import racers, Chief decides that he must include some of the racers in his upcoming Cash Days super-event.
51	5	"David & Goliath vs. the 405"	November 16, 2015	N/A
Daddy Dave is finally ready to unveil his new racecar, "Goliath," and take on the 405's Top Ten list. Controversy brews as Dave wants to bully his way up the list in the same fashion as Chief did with The Crow. Farmtruck and AZN are convinced the firehouse is haunted and they call a medium to rid their abode of evil spirits.
52	6	"Top of the List to Ya"	November 23, 2015	N/A
It's another 405 Top Ten list shake-up! Daddy Dave takes on Derek, Monza calls out Murder Nova, Boosted takes on Doc, Shane must race Chuck, and many other surprise races all over the list. Will Big Chief get dethroned? Will Dave continue to climb with Goliath? Farmtruck and AZN go fishing with the Dung beetle, taking on a pickup truck rival.
53	7	"Fear the Reaper"	November 30, 2015	N/A
After Daddy Dave crashes his new car, Chief attempts to reunite Dave with Jackie Knox so he can drive the Sonoma. Another racer, The Reaper, takes a shot at the list and tempers flare. Farmtruck attempts to surprise AZN by trying to locate his first car.
54	8	"$50K, All the Way!"	December 7, 2015	N/A
Dissatisfied with the outcome of the Nationwide Callout, Big Chief and the 405 crew decide host the most gigantic Cash Days in history! 32 cars from across the nation compete in a 2-day racing event with a $50,000 winner-take-all pot. Daddy Dave surprises everyone by showing up with a borrowed Corvette featuring the engine from the totaled Goliath, Jackie Knox resurrects and drives The Sonoma, Kye Kelly and the New Orleans crew bring their fastest, and Farmtruck and AZN have a grill out.

=== Season 7 (2016) ===
No. overall	No. in season	Title	Original release date	US viewers (millions)
55	1	"The Empire Builds Back"	April 25, 2016	N/A
Street Outlaws returns and OKC's biggest rivals attack the list with a vengeance. Chief and Shawn go on a recon mission to spy on Jackie Knox's test hit in the Sonoma under the guise of a low-rent ice cream truck. Jackie wants on the list and must race #10 Chuck while #2 Chief and #3 Doc square off in a battle for second position. Who will have what it takes to call out #1 Shawn in the Murder Nova? Farmtruck and AZN go fishing and try to give hell to a Hellcat and #5 Dominator attempts to race to new heights.
56	2	"It's Shane In The Membrane"	May 2, 2016	N/A
After holding off Doc last week, #2 Big Chief prepares to go head to head with his best friend, #1 Shawn in the Murder Nova to try to take back the crown. Will Chief's Crow become The King of the Streets again? It's a turbo, big tire battle royale! Farmtruck and AZN enter a lawn mower drag race. New rules are introduced by Chief. Reaper and Shane get heated as they try to move further away from Jackie Knox and his world famous Sonoma.
57	3	"Jumping The Shark-Pool"	May 9, 2016	N/A
Chief introduces an idea to make the list even faster, The Shark Pool. Now, a hungry group of street racers from all over Oklahoma will be showing up every week to take on #10. Partners in crime #3 Doc and #4 Monza battle it out for the coveted #3 spot! Farmtruck and AZN enlist a friend to make a real shark tank and race him to try avoiding paying the bill. Farmtruck reminds a shark pool racer that to race in the 405, you've got to pay your dues AND your debts.
58	4	"Sharks After Dark"	May 16, 2016	N/A
With the popularity of the Shark Pool, Chief must host 2 race nights! Henson, Your Mom, and Chuck 55 all show up to challenge the gatekeeper, leaving Shane swimming for his survival. On the second race night, Chief and Shawn rematch for the top spot.
59	5	"Daddy Day Car"	May 23, 2016	N/A
Daddy Dave returns as part of the Shark Pool with Henson's corvette "Plan B" the Cash Days finalist car. Dave's not the only hungry shark in the water as Tina Pierce returns from maternity leave and Boosted GT returns after being dropped from the list for his repeat absences. Will the self proclaimed "Big Tire Slayer" have what it takes or will he get knocked off by the "Fastest Chick in Oklahoma?" Farmtruck & AZN get themselves an import sleeper car to go fishing with, while the rivalry between #8 Jackie and #9 Shane seems to be just getting started.
60	6	"Knockin' on Heaven's Door"	June 4, 2016	N/A
The 405's fastest race rival, Detroit. Farmtruck and AZN build a bowling ball canon and get destructive. Chief races Brian "Chucky" Davis leading to the most devastating crash in SO history. Street racing will never be the same after this 2-hour special
61	7	"The Aftermath"	June 4, 2016	N/A
Big Chief struggles with PTSD after his crash, seeing his crash and the totaled Crow for the first time. The 405 racers return to list racing with an open #10 spot and the feeding frenzy begins. #2 Doc and #3 Monza set their sights on dethroning Shawn from his #1 spot and with #4 Dominator and #5 Reaper steamrolling up the list, none of the top spots are safe. Dave faces off against Jackie in the Sonoma for the #8 spot, while Shane and Derek battle for #6. Farmtruck searches for AZN's first street-raced car, a 1972 Chevy II.
62	8	"Rebirth of the Crow"	June 6, 2016	N/A
Big Chief wrestles with the idea of getting a new race car while the battle for top spots on the list gets cutthroat. After defending the #1 spot last week, Shawn's not out of the water yet, as #2 Doc takes another shot at the top. #3 Monza tries to hold his spot, but Reaper has other plans. #7 Daddy Dave looks to continue his rise in the Corvette, but he'll need to get past #6 Shane's Vega. A new shark, Jeremy, enters the water but he must face the Farmtruck who has finally gotten the infamous sleeper lined out.
63	9	"The Crow Also Rises..."	June 13, 2016	N/A
Times are changing in the 405 as Big Chief unveils his new ride, The Crow-mod. With pro-mods on the rise, everyone must now upgrade their cars to compete on the fastest list in the world. #2 Shawn looks to retake the crown against #1 Doc, while Reaper races Monza for the #3 spot. Farmtruck and AZN settle an old score in the Dung Beetle against a car with a vanity plate that says "Bug killer." Daddy Dave continues his run to the top five and tensions run hot between his team and the Reaper's on race night.
64	10	"Back on Track?"	June 13, 2016	N/A
With the Crow-mod almost ready to race, Chief confronts his PTSD and must get back behind the wheel. #3 Shawn pushes the Nova to its limits against #2 Monza in his Sinister Split Bumper Camaro. Boosted returns to battle Derek for #10, while a now turbo Dominator races Shane for #6. Reaper takes another shot at #4 Dave, but tensions boil over between him and Dave's crew, making a debacle on race night. Farmtruck and AZN build an RC Farmtruck with the Mad Scientist to prove AZN's go cart isn't as fast as he thinks it is.
65	11	"Ready, Set, Crow..."	June 20, 2016	N/A
All bets are off for the final race. Chief faces off against Farmtruck for the #10 spot. Rookie Jeremy calls out Dominator for the #6 spot. Reaper and Shane compete for the #5 spot. Shawn attempts another shot at #1.

=== Season 8 (2016) ===
No. overall	No. in season	Title	Original release date	US viewers (millions)
66	1	"If You Can't Beat-Le'em. Join 'Em"	October 31, 2016	N/A
Since everyone in the 405 has been upgrading their cars to compete with the lightweight pro-mods that are coming to the street, it's time to dive under the hoods of the 405 to find out what makes these guys so fast. Farmtruck and AZN struggle to get the Dung Beetle ready for fishing, and setup some races to get out of paying for some tuning. But, when AZN finds a problem with the Dung Beetle and it can't make it to the races, they have to scramble to get the Farmtruck ready to bail them out.
67	2	"Where The Streets Have No Name"	October 31, 2016	N/A
Street Outlaws returns and it's a list shake up from top to bottom. When Dave decides not to race Henson's Plan B Corvette on the list, pulls it from the #1 spot, and starts from the bottom in his own car, everyone on the list is taken by surprise. Farmtruck and AZN race their daily drivers, and Chief tries extreme measures to fix his old, faithful motor. When it's finally time for the first list race of the season, Doc and Shawn get ready for a #1 matchup, Chief hopes to move up from #9 and start a climb up the list, but Dave is right behind him.
68	3	"It's A Promod Party"	November 7, 2016	N/A
With Chief and Dave at the very bottom of the list and Lutz and Henson looking for their shot, Dave gets creative when it comes to moving up the list. The stakes are higher than ever with so many fast cars racing at the bottom at the same time. Farmtruck and AZN go salvage shopping, find themselves some explosive air bags, and then blow anything they can sky-high. And when it's time to pull the cars to the line, Dave convinces Chief to work together to move up instead of racing again and again at the bottom.
69	4	"OH-HI-NO"	November 14, 2016	N/A
When the 405 gets a last minute call-out from Ohio, it's a rush to get ready. Farmtruck and AZN fish out a Hot Rod and Kamikaze gets ready to bring the El Camino back. When Ohio arrives, the 405 tries to prove again they are the fastest on the street.
70	5	"I Still Haven't Found What I'm Looking For"	November 21, 2016	N/A
When Chief notices that racers on the list are calling out the same person week after week, he plots with Shawn to convince racers that it's time to accept new callouts. Meanwhile, Shane finds himself a grudge race to help pay for a new motor, but it doesn't turn out the way he would have liked. Farmtruck and AZN build themselves a Cadillac-inspired sofa, but get a callout while sitting down. And when everyone shows up for the list race, a fight about a callout threatens to turn an old Reaper rivalry violent.
71	6	"I Will Follow"	November 28, 2016	N/A
With Dave in the top 5, Chief close behind at 6, and Shawn, Monza, Doc, and Reaper all pushing their cars harder than ever, it's a top 5 shake up like the list has never seen before. Dominator struggles to get control of his new turbo setup, but gets help from Chief, Boosted and the rest of the turbo racers on the list. Farmtruck and AZN go cruising in the Dung Beetle and reel in a flashy fish. Then, at race night, things get testy as the top guys do everything they can to move up to the #1 spot.
72	7	"75,000 Reasons To Race"	December 5, 2016	N/A
The boys of the 405 are headed south to Ennis, Texas. In the two-hour Mega Week premiere, the OKC crew will race in front of 30,000 die-hard street racing fans at the Texas Motorplex in the American Outlaws Live event. More organized than the sport has ever been, this event may be the precursor of a national league of street racers, similar to NASCAR or IndyCar, (bringing the legitimacy of street racing to an all-time high).
73	8	"Stuck In A Moment"	December 12, 2016	N/A
Lately, everyone on the 405 list has been making call outs in order to hang on to their spots, instead of to move up the list, pissing off racers who are trying to move up. Farmtruck and AZN set their sights on improving the Farmtruck, and then test it out in a race. Reaper battles against car troubles that threaten to keep him from racing. Then on race night, things get heated when Dave makes a callout for a race that he has no intention of racing, and Chief continues his struggle to take back the number one spot.
74	9	"One"	December 19, 2016	N/A
It's the final list race of the season, and that means the pressure is on for everyone to make their final moves towards the top. Chief, Shawn, and Jeff Lutz all work to get their cars in perfect shape, hoping to end the season in the top spot. Kamikaze and Farmtruck both make their triumphant returns to list racing, and an old favorite makes it back on the list. Then on race night, everyone fights to end the season as high on the list as possible, and by the end of the night, there will be a new #1 on the 405 list.
75	10	"Street Mission"	December 26, 2016	N/A
When "JJ Da Boss" from Memphis invites the 405 to come race, they leave their pro-mods at home and head east. Chuck has finished making the Death Trap into big tire car and is back, hoping to prove himself. Ryan Martin also comes to the race with his big tire Camaro, which he hopes can be an asset for the 405. When the guys get to race night, they learn that the Memphis racers are some of the loudest and mouthiest racers they've ever met, and with everyone struggling to get down a junky asphalt road, everything comes down to the last race.
76	11	"Put Up for Your City"	January 2, 2017	N/A
After a long season of list racing, Chief decides to put the 405 to the test in a first-of-its-kind team race off. Brian Davis from Detroit, Petey Small Block from New York, and Boddie from California each bring a team of five to compete against OKC in a bracket style team race off. When Chief hears that none of the other teams are bringing pro-mods, the 405 decides to follow suit, and five of the 405's most OG racers step up to prove once again that OKC has the fastest group of street racers in the country.

=== Season 9 (2017) ===
No. overall	No. in season	Title	Original release date	US viewers (millions)
77	1	"vs. Fast N Loud: Build to Mega Race Part III"	March 13, 2017	N/A
Since the Street Outlaws agreed to race the guys from Fast n Loud, it's time to get to work on the cars, and fast. Farmtruck and AZN start on their budget build to race against Aaron, but when they realize they chose the wrong car, it's time to make a big change. Chief and Shawn set out in search of the perfect car, but they have their heart set on something that's almost impossible to find. And, when Chief hears some concerning rumors about Richard and his team, he's not sure he even wants to build a car anymore.
78	2	"vs. Fast N Loud: Build to Mega Race Part IV"	March 20, 2017	N/A
With only a week left to build their cars, the team at Midwest Streetcars and Farmtruck and AZN are scrambling to get their cars ready to race. Farmtruck and AZN finally get their car running and find time to make their Farmbird look the part, while Chief, Shawn, and their guys pull every spare part they can from old cars and the corners of their shop to try to build their car from the ground up in eight days. But, with little experience building cars on a schedule, both teams start to feel like they might not be able to finish in time.
79	3	"Vs. Fast N' Loud: The Mega Race"	March 27, 2017	N/A
With everyone finally in California, Chief and Richard get into it about who will drive their cars, and Farmtruck & AZN have to wait on Aaron. Then, it's time for the drivers to strap in, pull to the line, and race to see who has what it takes to win.
80	4	"Start Me Up"	April 10, 2017	N/A
Street Outlaws is back, and the guys in the 405 are making big changes. Chief kicks all the Pro-mods off the list. Then, it's time for an old school shakeup, everyone loses their spots and has to race to find out where they belong on the list.
81	5	"I Can't Get No Satisfaction"	April 17, 2017	N/A
After the list shakeup, the 405 has an entirely new list, but everyone is still fighting to get to the top. With Dave down for repairs, Chuck, Ryan, Shawn, & Monza battle to try to take the top spot, while Doc tries to get himself out of the bottom.
82	6	"Get Off My Cloud"	April 24, 2017	N/A
This week's race is all about the very top of the list & the very bottom. Ryan and Chuck are getting ready to battle for #1 again. At the bottom of the list, Farmtruck is feeling the heat and he does everything he can to hold onto a spot on the list.
83	7	"Brand New Car"	May 1, 2017	N/A
84	8	"Sympathy For The Devil"	May 8, 2017	N/A
85	9	"Can't You Hear Me Knocking"	May 15, 2017	N/A
86	10	"Time Is On My Side"	May 22, 2017	N/A
87	11	"Street Fightin' Man"	May 29, 2017	N/A
88	12	"Midnight Rambler"	June 5, 2017	N/A

=== No Prep Kings 1 (2018) ===
Beginning in 2018, No Prep Kings became the newest series in the Street Outlaws franchise, where racers took their racing from the street to the drag strip. "No Prep" means that "the race surface is not prepared ahead of time like it is in most forms of drag racing." (Source: Motortrend)

As of 2023, No Prep Kings (NPK) is now in Season 6. Ryan Martin was crowned the NPK Champion in 2019 (Season 3), 2021 (Season 4) and 2022 (Season 5), with his powertrain combo in 2021/2022 of a ProLine Hemi engine and ProCharger F-4X supercharger.

The Season 6 schedule is as follows: June 2–3 | National Trail Raceway | Hebron, OH June 9–10 | Virginia Motorsports Park | Petersberg, VA June 16–17 | Brainerd International Raceway | Brainerd, MN June 23–34 | Beech Bend Raceway | Bowling Green, KY June 30-July 1 | New England Dragway | Epping, NH Aug. 11-12 | Tulsa Raceway Park | Tulsa, OK Aug. 25-26 | Firebird Raceway | Eagle, ID Sept. 8-9 | Bandimere Speedway | Morrison, CO Sept. 22-23 | Dragway 42 | West Salem, OH Sept. 29-30 | Maple Grove Raceway | Mohnton, PA Oct. 6-7 | US 131 Motorsports Park | Martin, MI Oct. 13-14 | Galot Motorsports Park | Benson, NC Oct. 20-21 | Alabama International Dragway | Steele, AL Oct. 27-28 | Texas Motorplex | Ennis, TX (Source: noprep.com)

No. overall	No. in season	Title	Original release date	US viewers (millions)
91	1	"Making It in Memphis"	March 7, 2018	N/A
Round of 32 (16 races) at Memphis International Raceway in Millington, Tennessee.
92	2	"Memphis Money"	March 14, 2018	N/A
Final four rounds (15 races) at Memphis International Raceway in Millington, Tennessee.
93	3	"Ready, Set, Re-Do"	March 14, 2018	N/A
Round of 32 (16 races) at Beech Bend Raceway Park in Bowling Green, Kentucky.
94	4	"Bluegrass and Cash"	March 14, 2018	N/A
Final four rounds (15 races) at Beech Bend Raceway Park in Bowling Green, Kentucky.
95	5	"Texas Takedown"	March 21, 2018	N/A
The No Prep Kings round at Edinburg Motorsports Park in Edinburg, Texas.
96	6	"When the Dust Settles"	March 28, 2018	N/A
The No Prep Kings round at Tucson Dragway in Tucson, Arizona.
97	7	"San Antonio Jumpstart"	April 4, 2018	N/A
First round action from San Antonio Raceway in Marion, Texas.
98	8	"Lone Star Raincheck"	April 4, 2018	N/A
Second, third, and fourth round action continues in Marion. When weather forces abandonment, under No Prep Kings regulations, the final round is completed at the next venue, the South Carolina Motorplex in Neeses, South Carolina.
99	9	"South Carolina Two Step"	April 11, 2018	N/A
After the Marion, Texas round is finished in Neeses, the first round of the scheduled Neeses event is held.
100	10	"Carolina Callouts"	April 11, 2018	N/A
The third part of the Neeses rounds, the final four rounds of South Carolina Motorplex action in Neeses, South Carolina.
101	11	"Tar Heelin' and Dealin'"	April 18, 2018	N/A
First round action from GALOT Motorsports Park in Dunn, North Carolina.
102	12	"$40,000 and Dunn"	April 18, 2018	N/A
Second-round action of the GALOT rounds from Dunn, North Carolina.
103	13	"OK, Let's Do This"	April 25, 2018	N/A
The season finale at the Texas Motorplex in Ennis, Texas.

=== Fastest In America (2020-) ===
In this spin-off, 8 teams in the U.S. descend on cities to compete for the biggest street race.

=== Harry Allen Generating Station Fatal Incident ===
During filming on August 7, 2022 into the morning of August 8, Ryan Fellows' gold Nissan S30 bodied car (known as a "Datsun 240Z" when sold in the United States) was involved in crash during filming of the fourth season of Street Outlaws: Fastest In America on Las Vegas Boulevard near the Harry Allen Generating Station in Las Vegas. During the race the vehicle was involved in a crash, rolled over and burst into flames, killing the driver.

According to Sinclair News affiliate KSNV reports, Warner Bros. Discovery and Pilgrim Media Group (producers) had not authorized a film permit but had a Nevada Department of Transportation permit to close the street for filming.

The incident reignited a controversy from 2015, when the National Hot Rod Association threatened to revoke licenses of competitors who participate in Street Outlaws. NHRA events, held on closed circuits, have necessary crash walls and catch fencing, along with rescue times at proper points. Street Outlaws shows filmed on streets do not have barriers and it is unknown if safety crews are on the level of the NHRA Safety Safari.

== Video games ==
Street Outlaws: The List
- North American Xbox One cover art
- Developer: Team6 Game Studios
- Publishers: NA: GameMill Entertainment; EU: Maximum Games
- Engine: Unity
- Platforms: Nintendo Switch; PlayStation 4 Xbox One; Microsoft Windows
- Release: Nintendo Switch, PlayStation 4, Xbox One; October 22, 2019; Microsoft Windows; November 29, 2019
- Genre: Racing
- Modes: Single-player, multiplayer

A racing video game based on the series, Street Outlaws: The List, was released for Nintendo Switch, PlayStation 4, and Xbox One on October 22, 2019, and for Microsoft Windows on November 29, 2019. It was developed by Team6 Game Studios and published by GameMill Entertainment in North America and Maximum Games in Europe. Switch Player gave the game 2 out of 5 stars and summarized that "Street Outlaws: The List is a total drag. Not only is the racing boring to the level of watching paint dry, but the mechanical upgrading of vehicles is complex for those who aren't knowledgeable about cars. Only devout fans of the show or hardcore racing fans will find pleasure here."

Street Outlaws 2: Winner Takes All
- North American PlayStation 5 cover art
- Developer: Team6 Game Studios
- Publishers: NA: GameMill Entertainment; EU: Maximum Games
- Engine: Unreal Engine 4
- Platforms: PlayStation 4 PlayStation 5 Xbox One; Xbox Series X/S; Nintendo Switch; Microsoft Windows
- Release: PlayStation 4, PlayStation 5, Xbox One, Xbox Series X/S, Nintendo Switch; September 21, 2021; Microsoft Windows; December 3, 2021
- Genre: Racing
- Modes: Single-player, multiplayer

A sequel, Street Outlaws 2: Winner Takes All, was released for PlayStation 4, PlayStation 5, Xbox One, Xbox Series X/S, and Nintendo Switch on September 21, 2021, and for Microsoft Windows on December 3, 2021.
