= FlatOut (video game) =

2004 video game

- Developers: Bugbear Entertainment; Team6 Game Studios (Wii)
- Publishers: Empire Interactive; JP: Konami; Wii: NA: Zoo Games; EU: Funbox Media
- Designers: Janne Alanenpää; Tommi Hartikainen
- Programmer: Tatu Blomberg
- Artist: Mikko Kautto
- Series: FlatOut
- Platforms: Windows, PlayStation 2, Xbox, Wii
- Release: Windows, PS2, Xbox: EU: November 5, 2004; AU: November 12, 2004; NA: July 12, 2005; JP: October 13, 2005; Wii: NA: November 23, 2010; EU: July 27, 2012
- Genre: Racing
- Modes: Single-player, multiplayer

FlatOut (Note: known in Japan as Racing Game Chuui!!!!) is a 2004 racing video game developed by Finnish developer Bugbear Entertainment and published by Empire Interactive for Windows, PlayStation 2 and Xbox. Gameplay in FlatOut places emphasis on demolition derby-style races and features a sophisticated physics engine. Sixteen different cars are included, each with five different skins. The game is mostly known for car drivers flying through the windshield. An update for the PC version was released in July 2024, that implemented Steam Workshop support, improved support for the Steam Deck and added various quality-of-life improvements.

== Gameplay ==
Modes in FlatOut include standard races, in either open environments or race tracks, and demolition derby deathmatches, in which the last vehicle standing is declared the winner; both modes pit players against seven computer-controlled opponents. The game also includes special events which require the player to launch the driver out of his/her vehicle and meet certain requirements. In career mode, you can buy your future top racer from the junkyard. Wins are rewarded with a certain sum of cash, which allows the player to purchase vehicle upgrades and new vehicles.

FlatOut is noted for its extensive use of physics in vehicle damage and collisions; dents on vehicles may vary based on the type of accident, object and angle of impact (falling objects, for example, will damage mostly the upper areas of a car), while many roadside items react better to collisions from other vehicles.

Ragdoll physics is also present in the game, with drivers capable of being launched out of their car after high-impact crashes. This feature is extensively used in special events, when the player is required to launch a driver to a specific distance, height, or at a target.

The Xbox version of Flatout supports split screen for up to four players. The Playstation 2 supports up to two players split screen. The game supported online multiplayer with up to eight players online. The Xbox version supports System Link.

== Reception ==
Reception

Aggregate score
Aggregator	Score		
Aggregator	PC	PS2	Xbox
Metacritic	72/100	70/100	71/100

Review scores
Publication	Score		
Publication	PC	PS2	Xbox
Edge	7/10	7/10	7/10
Electronic Gaming Monthly	N/A	4.67/10	4.67/10
Eurogamer	N/A	N/A	8/10
Famitsu	N/A	28/40	N/A
Game Informer	N/A	6.5/10	6.5/10
GameSpot	7.9/10	7.9/10	7.9/10
GameSpy	N/A	4/5	4/5
GameTrailers	8.5/10	8.5/10	8.5/10
GameZone	8/10	7.9/10	N/A
IGN	7/10	7.5/10	7.5/10
Official U.S. PlayStation Magazine	N/A	2.5/5	N/A
Official Xbox Magazine (US)	N/A	N/A	7.2/10
PC Gamer (US)	75%	N/A	N/A
Detroit Free Press	N/A	N/A	2/4
The Sydney Morning Herald	4.5/5	4.5/5	4.5/5

FlatOut received "mixed or average" reviews on all platforms according to the review aggregation website Metacritic. In Japan, Famitsu gave the PlayStation 2 version a score of all four sevens for a total of 28 out of 40.

The Sydney Morning Herald gave the game a score of four-and-a-half stars out of five and stated: "The handling is remarkable, and the fact the tracks are littered with obstacles that bounce and crash realistically makes it all the more fun. Throw in excellent damage modelling and it's plain to see that this game has nailed the core mechanics of an addictive racer perfectly". The Times gave the PS2 and Xbox versions a score of four stars out of five and wrote that the truly suicidal "will be in awe of the driver's ability to launch himself fatally through the windscreen, screaming, while the rest of us will love the game's easy and responsive controls, and the authentic feel of the cars". Detroit Free Press, however, gave the Xbox version a score of two stars out of four and said that "if [the game] were only a $20 title, I'd heartily recommend it. But $50 is a lot of money to pay to turn yourself into road splatter over and over again. It's flawed, though fun". Maxim gave the game a score of two stars out of five and said it was "about as interesting as a public service announcement for seatbelts".

FlatOut was selected in 2017 for a collection of 100 classical Finnish games, which were presented on the opening of the Finnish Museum of Games in Tampere.

== Sequels ==
- A sequel, FlatOut 2, was released first, in Europe, on June 30, 2006. A larger variety of vehicles (including contemporary cars and pickup trucks) are included. The North American version was launched on August 1.
- In 2007, Bugbear released FlatOut: Ultimate Carnage, an enhanced remake of FlatOut 2, for Xbox 360. The Microsoft Windows version was released on August 1, 2008.
- In November 2010, Team6 Game Studios released a new game titled FlatOut for the Wii. The game was met with negative reviews.
- The third entry, FlatOut 3: Chaos & Destruction, was developed by Team6 Game Studios and published by Strategy First in December 2011 exclusively for Microsoft Windows. The game received overwhelmingly negative reviews.
- Flatout Stuntman is the Android-exclusive ragdoll game in the series. It was developed and published by Team6 Game Studios, and released in November 2013.
- FlatOut 4: Total Insanity developed by Kylotonn for the PlayStation 4, Xbox One, and Microsoft Windows was released in March 2017. The game was met with mixed reviews.
