= List of video games set in London =

This is a list of video games set in London or fictional cities that closely resemble it.

== List of games which feature London ==
Title	Year	Platform(s)	Genre(s)	Notes
Aero Fighters 3	1995	Arcade/Neo Geo CD	Shoot 'em up	Level 4 is set in London.
Alice: Madness Returns	2011	PC/PS3/Xbox 360	Horror	
Asphalt 7: Heat	2012	Android/iOS	Racing	
Asphalt 8: Airborne	2013	Android/iOS/Windows 8	Racing	
Assassin's Creed Syndicate	2015	PC/PS4/Xbox One	Action-adventure	
Battlefield 1	2016	PC/PS4/Xbox One	FPS	The final mission during the Friends In High Places story takes place above London, with the River Thames and Westminster being located below the player.
Beyond Hanwell	TBA	PC	FPS	Mainly based in the City of Westminster, London.
Broken Sword 2	1997	PlayStation/iOS/Android	Point-and-click adventure	A character explores a museum, gets on a Tube train at an abandoned Tube station and takes a trip down the River Thames.
Blur	2010	PC/PS3/Xbox 360	Racing	
Call of Duty: Modern Warfare	2019	PC/PS4/Xbox One	FPS	Two missions are set in London. The first is the mission Piccadilly, the second being Clean House.
Call of Duty: Modern Warfare 3	2011	PC/PS3/Xbox 360	FPS	The player is sent to Canary Wharf to secure cargo stolen by terrorists, the player then chases a Tube train before it derails.
City Run London: Winter 1545	2016	iOS/Android	Adventure	City Run London is a rescue adventure through the eight gate-towers along London Wall. With a bittersweet cast of characters and smoky soundscape bridging then and now, this game offers a time travel immersion inside a comic book aesthetic.
Civilization series	1991–present		Strategy	London appears as part of the English civilisation in all of the games.
Clock Tower 3	2003	PS2	Horror	
Command & Conquer 3: Tiberium Wars	2007	Mac OS X/Mobile/Windows/Xbox 360	Strategy	
Crisis Zone	1999	Arcade/PlayStation 2	Light gun shooter	
Cruis'n World	1996	Arcade/N64	Racing	
Dead Heat	2010	Arcade	Racing	Arcade game set in multiple places, including London.
Deus Ex: Mankind Divided	2016	PS4	Action-adventure	
Europe Racer	2002	PC/PS1	Racing	
Excitebike: World Rally	2010	Wii (WiiWare)	Racing	Features tracks set in London.
Gangs of London	2006	PSP	Action-adventure	
The Getaway	2002	PS2	Action-adventure	
The Getaway: Black Monday	2004	PS2	Action-adventure	
Gran Turismo 5 Prologue	2006	PS3	Racing	Has a London track, with certain landmarks.
Gran Turismo 5	2010	PS3	Racing	Has a London track, with certain landmarks.
Grand Theft Auto: London 1969	1999	DOS, Windows, PlayStation	Action-adventure	Mission pack for the game Grand Theft Auto.
Hampstead	1984	Commodore 64, ZX Spectrum, BBC Micro, Acorn Electron, iOS	Adventure	Game set in London suburb Hampstead. Initially released for Commodore 64 then ported to iOS in 2014.
Hellgate: London	2007	Windows	RPG	This is a post-apocalyptic version of London.
The Italian Job	2001	PS1/PC	Racing	
Killing Floor	2009	PC	FPS	
Legendary	2008	Xbox 360/PS3/PC	FPS	
London Racer	2000	PS1/PC	Racing	
London Racer II	2002	PS2	Racing	
London Racer: Destruction Madness	2002	PS1/PC	Racing	
London Racer: Police Madness	2002	PS1/PC	Racing	
Mario & Sonic at the London 2012 Olympic Games	2011	Wii/3DS	Sports	
Mario Kart Tour	2019	iOS/Android	Racing	Three race courses set in London, titled London Loop 1–3, appear in the game.
Mass Effect 3	2012	PC/Xbox 360/PS3/Wii U	RPG	
Medievil 2	2000	PlayStation	Action-adventure	
Metropolis Street Racer	2000	Dreamcast	Racing	
Microsoft Flight Simulator (all versions)	1982-	PC	Simulation	
Midnight Club: Street Racing	2000	PS2	Racing	
Midtown Madness 2	2000	PC	Racing	
Need for Speed: Shift	2009	Win/PS3/Xbox360	Racing	
Nightmare Creatures	1998	PS1/N64	Horror	
Ninja Gaiden 3	2012	PS3/360	Action-adventure	
Ninja Gaiden 3: Razor's Edge	2012	Wii U	Action-adventure	
Nioh	2017	PS4	Action-adventure	The beginning of the game is set in Tower of London. The majority of the game is set in Japan.
The Order: 1886	2015	PS4	Action-adventure	Set in Victorian London in an alternate timeline.
Project Gotham Racing	2001	Xbox	Racing	
Project Gotham Racing 3	2005	Xbox 360	Racing	
Project Gotham Racing 4	2007	Xbox 360	Racing	
Project Gotham Racing Mobile	2007	Mobile	Racing	
Resistance: Fall of Man	2007	PS3	FPS	Some levels are set in an alternate-history London.
Sherlock Holmes: Crimes & Punishments	2014	PS3, PS4, Xbox 360, Xbox One, PC	Adventure	Part of the Sherlock Holmes series of video games, all based in London.
Shift 2: Unleashed	2011	Win/PS3/Xbox360	Racing	
Shikkoku no Sharnoth: What a Beautiful Tomorrow	2008		Visual novel	Set in an alternate-universe version of early 20th century London and features some historical figures as major characters.
Silent Scope 2: Dark Silhouette	2000	Arcade, PlayStation 2	Shooter	
Sim City 3000	1999	PC	Simulator	Includes both the complete city and the terrain set.
Sim City 4	2003	Windows, Linux, Mac OS, Mac OS X	Simulator	Includes a terrain set for the London area, but the city itself is only partly created.
Streets of London	1983	Commodore 64	Text-adventure	
The Chaos Engine	1993	Amiga, Atari ST, PC, CD32, Mega Drive, SNES, Mac	Run and gun	Set in Victorian London in an alternate timeline.
Thrasher: Skate and Destroy	1999	PlayStation	Sports	Includes a level based on South Bank in London.
Tomb Raider 3	1998	PC, PlayStation	Action-adventure	Lara Croft visits four London areas in the game, including St Paul's Cathedral, Aldwych station, the Natural History Museum and the City of London itself.
Tony Hawk's Pro Skater 4	2002	Xbox, PlayStation, PS2, GameCube, Windows, Mac OS X	Sports	London is a playable level which it is based on the area of Trafalgar Square. The PlayStation version also features a level called "London Sewers".
Top Gear: Dare Devil	2000	PS1/PC	Racing	
Uncharted 3	2011	PS3	Action-adventure	The earlier levels of the game are set in a London public house, several backstreets, an abandoned warehouse area which overlooks St Paul's Cathedral and The Gherkin, the London Underground, and several fictional underground tube stations, as well as a fictional series of tunnels under the city itself that house the secret library of T. E. Lawrence.
Vampire: The Masquerade - Redemption	2000	PC	Action RPG	Parts of the story are set in different cities, including London.
Watch Dogs: Legion	2020	PC/PS4/Xbox One	Action-adventure	Open world action game set in a fictionalized near future depiction of London.
Werewolves of London	1989	ZX Spectrum, Amstrad CPC, Commodore 64	Action-adventure	Mastertronic-published game where players assume the role of a werewolf who must kill all the members of the family who have cursed him. Locations include Hyde Park and the London Underground.
Wolfenstein: The New Order	2014		Action-adventure	Features Nazi alternate history version of London in some levels.
ZombiU	2012	Wii U	Horror	Post-zombie apocalypse survival horror set in London.
Vampyr	2018	Pc, Xbox One, PlayStation 4	Action RPG	Play as a vampire in Victorian London.
The Great Ace Attorney: Adventures	2015	Nintendo Switch, PlayStation 4, Android, iOS, Microsoft Windows, Nintendo 3DS	Visual Novel	A lawyer who pursuing the truth about London's crime events and even bigger dark secret of London.
The Great Ace Attorney 2: Resolve	2017	Nintendo Switch, PlayStation 4, Android, iOS, Microsoft Windows, Nintendo 3DS	Visual Novel	The sequel of The Great Ace Attorney: Adventures in The Great Ace Attorney Chronicles.

== List of games which feature a fictional city closely based on London ==
Title	Year	Platform(s)	Genre(s)	Notes
Bloodborne	2015	PS4	RPG	Set in Yharnam, a 'Gothic Horror' city inspired by Victorian London.
Destroy All Humans! 2	2006	Mobile/PS2/Xbox	Action-adventure	Part of the game takes place in a city called Albion which is loosely based on London.
Dishonored	2012	PS3, Xbox 360, PC, PS4, Xbox One	Stealth game	The main setting of Dishonored, Dunwall, is heavily inspired by Victorian London.
Devil May Cry 5	2019	Microsoft Windows PlayStation 4 Xbox One	Action-adventure	The main setting of the game is Red Grave City, the visual design of which takes many elements from London.
Puzzle & Action: Tant-R	1994	Mega Drive	Puzzle	Robo and Mobo appear outside the Palace of Westminster at the end of competition mode. The Palace of Westminster, Tower Bridge, and St Paul's Cathedral appear in the city background during the first bonus stage.
Pokémon Sword and Shield	2019	Nintendo Switch	RPG	One of the cities in the game, Wyndon, is based on London.

== See also ==
- List of video games set in New York City
- List of fiction set in Chicago
