= Glimmerati =

2005 video game

- Developer: Bugbear Entertainment
- Publisher: Nokia
- Platform: N-Gage
- Release: EU: July 7, 2005; NA: August 16, 2005
- Genre: Racing
- Modes: Single-player, multiplayer

Glimmerati is a 2005 racing video game developed by Bugbear Entertainment and published by Nokia for the N-Gage.

== Story ==
In the game's story, the player is a wealthy heir who meets with another wealthy man one day, and he admires the player's skill in driving. He invites the player to compete with Club Glimmerati, an exclusive gathering of famous and rich people who race in the public streets for fun.

== Reception ==
Reception

Aggregate score
Aggregator	Score
Metacritic	82/100

Review scores
Publication	Score
GameSpot	8.1/10
GameSpy	4.5/5
GameZone	8.9/10
IGN	8.1/10

Glimmerati received "favorable" reviews according to the review aggregation website Metacritic.
