= Road Redemption =

2017 video game

- Cover art
- Developers: Redemption Road Games; Pixel Dash Studios
- Publisher: Tripwire Interactive
- Director: Ian Fisch
- Engine: Unity
- Platforms: Microsoft Windows; macOS; Linux; Nintendo Switch; PlayStation 4; Xbox One; Android; iOS
- Release: Microsoft Windows, macOS, Linux; October 4, 2017; PlayStation 4, Xbox One, Nintendo Switch; November 6, 2018; Android, iOS; September 28, 2022
- Genres: Vehicular combat, racing
- Modes: Single-player, multiplayer

Road Redemption is a vehicular combat racing video game developed by EQ-Games and Pixel Dash Studios. The game is a spiritual successor to the Road Rash series and was released for Windows, macOS and Linux personal computers on October 4, 2017. Console versions of Road Redemption were released on November 6, 2018, for PlayStation 4, Xbox One, and Nintendo Switch, and mobile versions for Android and iOS followed in September 2022.

== Gameplay ==
The game is a spiritual successor to the Road Rash series of racing video games. The game aims to replicate the arcade-like simplicity and silliness of the Road Rash games, while introducing more modern graphics and gameplay mechanics. In addition to the melee weapons featured in Road Rash, Road Redemption introduces firearms in the players options for weapons as well. The game will feature split screen multiplayer modes, including the computer-based ones, which is more of a rarity for the platform. The proposed Wii U version would have also featured the ability for multiplayer sessions to take place with one player on the television and the other using just the Wii U GamePad screen.

== Development ==
In 2009, Ian Fisch, a long time fan of the Road Rash series wrote a blog post on why the game needed a revival. He had intended for the blog post to be a call for developers Electronic Arts to revisit the series, but following the commercial failures of racing/combat hybrids such as Split/Second and Blur, he believed there would be no appetite for such game from an established publisher, so began working on his own take on the game.

The game was first announced April 2013, alongside a Kickstarter crowdfunding campaign. The campaign raised over $173,000, successfully exceeding its $160,000 goal. While the game was funded for development, it missed the 198,000 stretch goal for a virtual reality Oculus Rift version. Paul Fisch, a developer on the game elaborated on reasons why their Kickstarter campaign did not "take off" in a piece for The Penny Arcade Report. In it, he blamed the timing of the campaign launch and general crowdfunding fatigue.

Developed New Orleans–based studios EQ-Games and Pixel Dash Studios, the game was initially intended for an August 2014 release, which was pushed back to November 2014 at the release of the alpha version in April 2014. While an early beta version was released through Steam Early Access in September 2014, the game missed its 2014 release date, and a lack of further updates in 2015 lead to fears of the game being cancelled. An update in April 2016 clarified that development was still proceeding, with a Q3 2016 release date planned for Microsoft Windows, macOS and Linux. PlayStation 4, Xbox One, and Wii U versions are planned for sometime afterwards. Initial 2016 updates did not mention the Wii U as a platform, again causing speculation towards cancellation of that particular version, but DarkSeas Games clarified that the Wii U version was still planned, but was relegated to a release window after the PS4 and Xbox One versions, citing extra work that would have to be done to get the game running on the less-powerful Wii U. In May 2018, DarkSeas Game announced they had shifted development to a Nintendo Switch release.

After the game's release, DarkSeas Game's also intended on making the game open-source, allowing for people to create mods for the game, although such plans never came to fruition. DarkSeas Game's also teamed up with Yacht Club Games to bring their Shovel Knight character to the game as a playable character.

== Reception ==
=== Pre-release ===
In Eurogamer's Steam Early Access review of the game, Dan Whitehead praised the game despite its quirks and glitches, stating "There are a lot of problems, in other words, and the development team has a lot of balancing and polishing to do if Road Redemption is to become a genuinely satisfying and well-rounded successor to its inspiration. Yet for all of the scruffiness, rough edges and half-baked ideas, the game works brilliantly where it matters." Polygon referred to the same early build as "a crazier, deeper Road Rash" that was "as fast, crazed and violent as its obvious inspiration." The game's $40 price point for an alpha release caught criticism from some websites.

=== Post-release ===
According to the review aggregate website Metacritic, Road Redemption received "mixed or average reviews".

== See also ==
- Road Rage
