= Wreckfest =

2018 video game

- Developer: Bugbear Entertainment
- Publisher: THQ Nordic (Note: Android and iOS versions published by HandyGames.)
- Engine: ROMU
- Platforms: Windows; PlayStation 4; Xbox One; PlayStation 5; Xbox Series X/S; Stadia; Nintendo Switch; Android; iOS
- Release: June 14, 2018: Windows; June 14, 2018; PS4, Xbox One; August 27, 2019; PS5, Xbox Series X/S; May 4, 2021; Stadia; December 1, 2021; Switch; June 21, 2022; Android, iOS; November 15, 2022
- Genres: Vehicular combat, racing
- Modes: Single-player, multiplayer

Wreckfest is a racing video game developed by Bugbear Entertainment and published by THQ Nordic. Wreckfest is described as the spiritual successor to the FlatOut series, which was created by Bugbear, and takes further inspiration from the Destruction Derby series and the cult 1989 racer Street Rod. A notable feature of the game engine is the use of soft-body damage modelling, which enables location-based damage that affects the driving dynamics of vehicles in a realistic fashion.

After a four-year long early access phase during which the game was called Next Car Game, the Windows version was released in June 2018, with PlayStation 4 and Xbox One versions released in August 2019 after multiple delays. PlayStation 5 and Xbox Series X/S versions were released in 2021, while a Nintendo Switch version was released in 2022. A mobile port was released on 14 November 2022.

Wreckfest has received generally positive reviews from critics and been nominated for numerous awards. A sequel, Wreckfest 2, was announced to be in development in August 2024.

== Gameplay ==
The game includes a variety of gameplay features, namely banger racing and demolition derby. The player controls a car in a race or demolition derby, the goal being to win the race or be the sole survivor of the derby respectively. Before participating in an event, the player is allowed to choose a vehicle, select from a variety of assist levels (whether to use a manual or automatic transmission, ABS, AI difficulty, etc.). Players are also able to buy vehicles, customise vehicles, and perform upgrades. The game features three modes: career, multiplayer and custom events.

The races focus heavily on vehicular combat, where players have to find a balance between defensive tactics such as avoiding or blocking opponents and more aggressive tactics such as ramming opponents and shunting them into barriers to put them out of the race and earn points. While Wreckfest's focus on physics and vehicular damage is similar to previous destruction-based racing games such as Criterion's Burnout, it follows a somewhat slower and more strategic approach, resulting in a more traditional racing gameplay experience than in comparable games.

== Development ==
Development on Wreckfest began in 2012 under the working title Next Car Game, and was first announced by Bugbear Entertainment on the Next Car Game blog in August 2013. In an interview with IGN, lead game designer Janne Suur-Näkki stated that the game should reach a "feature-complete state" in 2014, with all key features implemented. In a press release published by Eurogamer, Next Car Game was officially announced for PC.

Due to the lack of publisher support, the development team provided early access to the game via pre-orders on the official Next Car Game website as well as Steam Early Access and also created a Kickstarter campaign as alternate means of raising revenue in order to develop the game. The overhaul of the physics engine has caused updates to the game to slow significantly. The game now receives regular monthly updates from April 2020 with a focus on tournaments and cosmetic DLC content.

=== Failed Kickstarter campaign ===
Bugbear launched a Kickstarter campaign on November 1, 2013 in an effort to fund the development of Next Car Game, with a goal of $350,000 to complete the game, and a stretch goal of $1.5 million to create PlayStation 4 and Xbox One versions of the game. The campaign was cancelled on November 22, after it became "obvious" that the game would not reach its funding goal, having only raised $81,772. Lead game designer Janne Suur-Näkki described the Kickstarter campaign as a bewildering and disappointing experience, as Bugbear had to go to "great lengths" to make the campaign happen due to Kickstarter and Finnish legislation imposing "considerable challenges" on the project.

After failing to meet the $350,000 goal of the Kickstarter campaign, Bugbear concentrated efforts on a pre-order campaign being run via the Next Car Game official website. A playable "technology sneak peek" was made available for download to supporters who had pre-ordered the game, the sneak peek featured 24 vehicles and a single level which the developers used internally to test the game's damage engine. Following a highly positive response from players regarding the sneak peek, Bugbear released an extended version called Sneak Peek v2.0 to all pre-order supporters. This extended sneak peek included additional features such as new destructive machinery, more dynamic destructible objects, and a "physics cannon".

=== Early access ===
Following the success of the Technology Sneak Peek, an early access version of the game was released shortly before Christmas in 2013. The early access release featured two playable vehicles and three tracks, two of which were traditional racetracks while the other was a demolition derby arena.

The early access release was highly successful and received great feedback from sim racers. By the end of the Christmas week the game had already sold for more than Bugbear's initial funding goal of $350,000 on Kickstarter. Next Car Game was subsequently released on Steam Early Access on January 15, 2014, with special discount prices offered until January 29. The game found tremendous success on the Steam Early Access platform, earning over $1 million in sales during a single week.

On October 3, 2014, Bugbear made an announcement on the game's blog entry for the game's sixth build that Next Car Game was now titled Wreckfest. The announcement came with a definition of the term "wreck fest" written on Urban Dictionary. In the same announcement, Bugbear also announced an eighteen-player online multiplayer has been introduced with new deathmatch and team deathmatch game modes, as well as a new track and a new car. The developer also said that they were aiming for twenty-four-player multiplayer for the final release, but will need to spend more time optimizing the game's network code.

=== Release ===
The Windows version of the game was released out of early access on June 14, 2018. The PlayStation 4 and Xbox One versions were originally scheduled for release on November 20, 2018, but were delayed to 2019. On July 2, 2019, THQ Nordic announced that the game will be released on console in August 2019.

== Reception ==
Reception

Aggregate score
Aggregator	Score
Metacritic	PC: 81/100; PS4: 82/100; XONE: 83/100; PS5: 79/100; XSXS: 71/100; NS: 79/100

Review scores
Publication	Score
Eurogamer	Recommended
Game Informer	8.5/10
GameSpot	9/10
IGN	9/10
Nintendo Life	8/10
PC Gamer (US)	75/100
Push Square	PS4: 7/10; PS5: 7/10
TouchArcade	4/5

Wreckfest received "generally favorable" reviews for most platforms according to review aggregator website Metacritic; the Xbox Series X/S version received "mixed or average" reviews.

The game was nominated for "Best Sports Game" at Gamescom 2017, for "Racing Game of the Year" at the 22nd Annual D.I.C.E. Awards, and for "Game, Original Racing" at the National Academy of Video Game Trade Reviewers Awards.
