= Taxi Chaos =

- Developer: Team6 Game Studios
- Publishers: Orange One (Switch); Lion Castle (other versions)
- Platforms: Nintendo Switch, PlayStation 4, Xbox One, Microsoft Windows
- Release: February 23, 2021 October 19, 2021 (Windows)
- Genre: Racing
- Mode: Single-player

Taxi Chaos is a 2021 racing video game developed by Team6 Game Studios and released for the Nintendo Switch, PlayStation 4, and Xbox One. Playing as a taxi driver, gameplay involves delivering customers to their destinations within a time limit. The game was viewed by critics as a spiritual successor to Crazy Taxi (1999). It received mixed reviews.

== Gameplay ==
Taxi Chaos is set in the fictional New Yellow City, based on New York City. The game features two taxi drivers – Vinny and Cleo – and several unlockable taxicabs. The player's objective is to pick up customers and deliver them to their destinations as quickly as possible. Customers rate the player's performance using a five-star scale. The player's vehicle can reach rooftops, and can jump from one building to another using ramps.

The game has three modes: Arcade, Pro, and Freeroam. Arcade is the standard game mode, in which the player has a time limit for delivering as many customers as possible. This mode includes an arrow which provides guidance to the player, pointing toward each customer's destination. Pro mode removes the arrow, requiring the player to be familiar with the large game map. Freeroam lacks a time limit and allows the player to explore the city. It also features some customers who request that the player locate their scattered items, prompting exploration.

== Development and release ==
Taxi Chaos was developed by the Dutch company Team6 Game Studios. It was released on February 23, 2021, for PlayStation 4 (PS4), Nintendo Switch, and Xbox One. The Switch version was published by Orange One, while the other versions were published by Lion Castle. Sega had previously published the similar game Crazy Taxi in 1999. Team6 initially stated that Sega would be involved in the distribution of Taxi Chaos throughout Asia, although Sega later denied this.

== Reception ==
Reception

Aggregate score
Aggregator	Score
Metacritic	44/100 (PS4); 52/100 (Switch); 59/100 (Xbox One)

Review scores
Publication	Score
Destructoid	5/10 (Xbox One)
Eurogamer	6/10 (Xbox One)
Hardcore Gamer	3.5/5 (Xbox One)
HobbyConsolas	60/100 (Switch)
Nintendo Life	6/10 (Switch)
Nintendo World Report	5.5/10 (Switch)
Push Square	4/10 (PS4)
Shacknews	3/10 (PS4)
NME	1/5

According to Metacritic, the PS4 version of Taxi Chaos received "generally unfavorable reviews", while the other versions received "mixed or average reviews". Metacritic listed the game as the fourth-worst game of 2021.

Critics compared the game to Crazy Taxi, viewing it as a spiritual successor or clone. Jeremy Peeples of Hardcore Gaming called it a "flawed" but "admirable" effort, while CJ Andriessen of Destructoid wrote "like a lot of 'spiritual successors,' it comes nowhere near measuring up to its predecessor". Others considered it a "shameless" rip-off.

Reviewers found the customers' dialogue to be repetitive, and considered the soundtrack underwhelming. Critics also complained of glitches, such as vehicles getting stuck or passing through objects, although Peeples wrote that the glitches were "so goofy, it almost works in the game's favor".

Some critics found the game's landscape to be empty and lifeless, although Team6 planned to address this in a future patch which would increase the number of vehicles and pedestrians. Chris Jarrard of Shacknews wrote that the city is "oddly silent much of the time, lacking any ambiance players may expect of a city modeled after The Big Apple. No one yells at you when you smash into their car. Chaos is likely the last word I'd use to describe the proceedings".

Ollie Reynolds of Nintendo Life criticized the "flawed gameplay" and "lack of longevity". Andriessen called it "a pretty fun game to play…for about five minutes. That's about as long as it took me to realize there really isn't much game here". Peeples praised the open world environment and the Free roam mode.

Zack Zwiezen of Kotaku praised the graphics, although other reviewers were not satisfied. Jarrard wrote, "Everything other than the cabs themselves is as bland as can be. Some objects are cartoonishly bright and colorful, while others portray a more realistic tone, leading to a visual mess". Alan Wen of NME wrote that the game "lacks polish, both in its resolution and framerate, even on the PS4 version".
