= Wreckfest 2 =

2025 racing video game

- Developer: Bugbear Entertainment
- Publisher: THQ Nordic
- Platforms: Windows; PlayStation 5; Xbox Series X/S
- Release: Windows; March 20, 2025; (early access)
- Genres: Vehicular combat, racing
- Modes: Single-player, multiplayer

Wreckfest 2 is a 2025 racing video game developed by Bugbear Entertainment and published by THQ Nordic. It is a sequel to Wreckfest. The game was released through Steam's early access program on March 20, 2025, for Microsoft Windows only and works on Linux with Steam. PlayStation 5 and Xbox Series X/S dates are yet to be announced.

== Gameplay ==
Wreckfest 2 features improved physics with its enhanced engine, ROMU. Like its predecessor, the game provides various customization to vehicles. In addition to the single-player and multiplayer modes, a local split-screen mode will be supported.

== Development and release ==
The game was announced in August 2024 as a sequel to the 2018 video game Wreckfest. Bugbear Entertainment and THQ Nordic return to work on the game. The game was released through Steam's early access program on March 20, 2025.
