= Super Street: The Game =

2018 video game

- Developers: Rebel Games; Team6 Game Studios
- Publisher: Lion Castle Entertainment
- Composer: Deon Van Heerden
- Engine: Unreal Engine 4
- Platforms: Microsoft Windows; PlayStation 4 Xbox One; Nintendo Switch
- Release: September 11, 2018
- Genres: Racing; Action

Super Street The Game is a 2018 action-racing video game based on the Super Street magazine along with assistance of the Motor Trend Group. The game was developed by Rebel Games and Team6 Game Studios, and published by Lion Castle Entertainment for the PlayStation 4, Xbox One, Nintendo Switch, and Microsoft Windows worldwide. The Nintendo Switch had a sequel to the first game titled Super Street: Racer in 2019.

== Gameplay ==
The player races events using fictional takes on real-world cars. There is an extensive customization selection in the garage and there are realistic damage models, since there is no licensing limitations regarding its vehicles. There are different stages and maps for each terrain from the desert to small towns and big cities. As the player progresses, they can hire crew members to help work their way to the top.

The game is inspired by the Midnight Club racing series by Rockstar.

== Development and release ==
The game was created using Unreal Engine 4. The soundtrack was composed by Deon Van Heerden. It was released on September 11, 2018.

In December, there was an update released for all platforms. This update included new cars, customization, five new race events, and there was a brief 50% discount on the game in stores.

== Reception ==
The game received mixed reviews by critics. The upsides being the extreme sense of customization and having a heavily realistic damage system, but the criticisms were that the game did not seem finished. Criticisms include the driving system being unstable, the graphics being a downgrade by newer game standards, the story and environment lacked, and there was very little updates to the game. It was also criticized for being overpriced and for lacking general interaction in multiplayer. The game was also compared to Road Rage with its gameplay, and it having decent soundtrack.

On Metacritic, Super Street: The Game holds 6.3 for the PlayStation 4, a 6.1 for the PC, a 6.2 for Xbox One, and 4.1 for Super Street: Racer on the Nintendo Switch.
