= Road Rage (2017 video game) =

- Cover art
- Developer: Team6 Game Studios
- Publisher: Maximum Games
- Programmers: Maas Bello, Joppe van der Meij, Viktor Zoutman, Emyl van der Kooi
- Engine: Unreal Engine 4
- Platforms: Microsoft Windows; PlayStation 4 Xbox One
- Release: WW: November 14, 2017
- Genres: Vehicular combat, racing
- Modes: Single-player, multiplayer

Road Rage is a 2017 vehicular combat racing video game developed by Team6 Game Studios and published by Maximum Games, released worldwide on November 14, 2017, for Microsoft Windows, PlayStation 4 and Xbox One. The title was inspired by the famed Road Rash series of video games, which feature similar gameplay mechanics.

== Gameplay ==
Road Rage is set in the open world, fictitious city of Ashen. Players ride around on a motorcycle and are free to explore the city at their leisure. Ashen itself is divided into seven districts, ranging from the downtown core to suburban farmland. Gameplay in Road Rage is composed mostly of standard "circuit" races, time trials, the performing of stunts and assassinations of rival bikers, all of which and more are encountered throughout the campaign. While racing, players are armed with melee weapons (and firearms in the late game) which may be used to attack opponents. All gameplay and combat takes place entirely on the bike, with players being able to simultaneous accelerate and hit opposing racers with weapons such as baseball bats, hockey sticks, axes and long knives. The motorcycle can be upgraded via cash won from events, with an option to buy improved vehicles, cosmetics and additional weapons as well.

The game features both split-screen and online multiplayer alongside the single player campaign. Both modes feature up to four players in events similar to those found in the campaign.

== Release ==
Originally announced in February, 2016, the game was intended to be released in late 2016, but was pushed back one year to October, 2017. After one more delay, the game officially released on November 14, 2017, in both digital and physical formats, at a budgeted price of USD$29.99 and CAD$39.99.

== Reception ==
Reception

Aggregate score
Aggregator	Score
Metacritic	(PS4) 26/100 (XONE) 33/100

Upon release, Road Rage received "generally unfavorable reviews", according to review aggregator website Metacritic. The PlayStation 4 version holds a 27/100, while the Xbox One version holds a 33/100. Critics cited nearly every aspect of the game as being underwhelming, including the combat, driving, presence of numerous glitches, poor graphics and empty world. Metacritic listed the game as the second worst game of 2017.

== See also ==
- Road Redemption
