= News Tower =

- Developer: Sparrow Night
- Publisher: Twin Sails Interactive
- Platforms: Windows; macOS
- Release: November 18, 2025
- Genre: Business simulation
- Mode: Single-player

News Tower is a business simulation indie game developed by Rotterdam-based Sparrow Night and published by Twin Sails Interactive. It entered early access on February 13, 2024 for Windows and MacOS, and was fully released on November 18, 2025.

Set in 1930s New York City during the Great Depression and Prohibition era, players assume the role of a newspaper publisher who inherits a struggling local paper from their uncle. Players must balance journalistic integrity against pressure from influential factions who may offer rewards for favorable coverage, while designing and optimizing their newspaper headquarters floor by floor and meeting weekly publishing deadlines.

== Development ==
Sparrow Night was conceived in late 2018 when Jan-Maarten Nachtegeller, who had prior experience in game development, collaborated with Stefan Rijsmus, founder and creative director of Studio Nul, a design, film and technology studio. The partnership officially began in early 2019, with the founders expanding their team to include additional developers and an illustrator to work on their debut project, News Tower.

News Tower entered Steam Early Access on February 13, 2024, for PC and Mac platforms. The game fully released on November 18, 2025.

== Reception ==
TechRadar called it "a fantastic simulator game full of management queries and moral quandaries". Fraser Brown at PC Gamer praised the intensity of the moral decisionmaking and the ability to pick and choose among objectives.

News Tower won Best Game, Best Audio, Best Game Design, and Best Debut Game at the 2024 Dutch Game Awards.
