= FlatOut 3: Chaos & Destruction =

2011 video game

- Developer: Team6 Game Studios
- Publisher: Strategy First
- Producer: Ronnie Nelis
- Designer: Ronnie Nelis
- Programmer: Erwin de Vries
- Artist: Ronnie Nelis
- Composers: Thomas Moonan; Steve Lindsay; Ronnie Nelis
- Series: FlatOut
- Platform: Microsoft Windows
- Release: 13 December 2011
- Genres: Action, racing
- Modes: Single-player, multiplayer

FlatOut 3: Chaos & Destruction is an action racing video game developed by Team6 Game Studios and published by Strategy First. Unlike most other titles before it in the FlatOut series, it was not developed by Bugbear Entertainment. The game was released worldwide on 13 December 2011 only for Microsoft Windows.

FlatOut 3: Chaos & Destruction received overwhelmingly negative reviews from critics and is considered to be one of the worst video games of all time.

== Gameplay ==
There are 9 game modes including Speed, Night Shift, Stunt Man, Off Road, Challenge, Monster Truck, and Battle Arena. Players can choose from 20 characters and up to 47 vehicles. All modes except Challenge are playable online with up to 16 players. Force-feedback is supported via racing wheel peripherals.

== Reception ==
Reception

Aggregate score
Aggregator	Score
Metacritic	23/100

Review scores
Publication	Score
Edge	1/10
Eurogamer	1/10
GamesMaster	1/10
GameSpot	5/10
GameSpy	1/5
PC Gamer (UK)	28%
The Digital Fix	1/10

Unlike its predecessors, FlatOut 3 received extremely negative reviews and is considered one of the worst games of all time.

FlatOut 3 is one of the two games Edge has ever given a score of one out of ten to in its history (the other being Kabuki Warriors). Eurogamer also gave it a one out of ten score and criticised all aspects of the game, especially the controls and the AI. It also lamented the fall from grace of the FlatOut series as a whole and summed up the review by saying: "You could go mad trying to rationalise Flatout 3. It is not bad in the way that a game like Boiling Point is bad, where things coalesce into a kind of awful greatness. This is a tacky and technically incompetent production with no redeeming features whatsoever, devoid of fun and an insult to the name it bears. Flatout once burned bright, but now is gone - and if there is a driving hell, this is surely it". GamesMaster also gave the game one out of ten and said: "Some games are so bad they're good (for a laugh, at least). FlatOut 3 is just plain bad". GameSpot gave the game its highest score by giving it five out of ten, praising the Demolition mode and the wide range of game modes, but like in other reviews the AI, controls and the bad collision detection were criticised.

The game received "unfavorable" reviews according to the review aggregation website Metacritic. Metacritic lists the game as the lowest scoring game of 2011.

== See also ==
- List of video games notable for negative reception
