= Manhattan Chase =

2005 video game

- Developer(s): Team6 Game Studios
- Publisher(s): Denda
- Engine: Open Dynamics Engine
- Platform(s): Windows
- Release: June 1, 2005
- Genre(s): Action-adventure, driving, third-person shooter

Manhattan Chase is an action-adventure and driving video game developed by Team6 Game Studios and released in 2005 for Microsoft Windows.

== Gameplay ==
The game features a choice between two related storylines, with female protagonists, with on opposite sides of the law. The two characters that can be selected are Angel, who is described as having a "hard and hostile approach towards thugs and is as tough as they come", and Yasmin, a "cold, hard woman with an heart [sic] of ice".

== Reception ==
Just Press Play gave the game a 0.5 score, criticizing the graphics, physics, gameplay, and storyline.
