= FlatOut =

Video game series

- Developers: Bugbear Entertainment (2004–2008); Team6 Game Studios (2010–2013); Kylotonn (2017)
- Publishers: Empire Interactive (2005–2008); Strategy First (2006–2017); Zoo Games (2010); Team6 Game Studios (2013); Bigben Interactive (2017)
- Platforms: Microsoft Windows, PlayStation 2, PlayStation 4, Xbox, Xbox 360, Xbox One, PlayStation Portable, Wii, Android, OS X, Linux, Meta Quest, PlayStation 5
- First release: FlatOut; November 5, 2004
- Latest release: FlatOut 4: Total Insanity; March 17, 2017

FlatOut is a series of action demolition derby/racing video games created by Finnish independent video game developer Bugbear Entertainment. The FlatOut series has sold a total of almost three million units worldwide. After Bugbear developed FlatOut: Head On, Dutch video game developer Team6 Game Studios developed the next three games in the series, which are the Windows-exclusive FlatOut 3 and two spin-offs on Wii and Android. Kylotonn developed the series' fourth installment, FlatOut 4: Total Insanity, which was released on March 17, 2017, for PlayStation 4 and Xbox One in Europe and May 2 in the United States. In 2024, Flat2VR Studios announced a remake of FlatOut (2004) for Meta Quest, PSVR2, and SteamVR.

The series has received both critical acclaim during Bugbear's development and notable negative reception after the bankruptcy of Empire Interactive and ownership change to Team6 with most notably FlatOut 3: Chaos & Destruction being considered one of the worst video games of all time and FlatOut 2 and its remake Ultimate Carnage being considered the best in the series. It was called a welcome addendum to the derby-racing genre at first but eventually died out due to a lack of critical reception alongside constant developer and publisher changes. Original developer Bugbear have since released Wreckfest (2017), which is considered a spiritual successor to the FlatOut series.

== Games ==
Title	Year released	Platforms
FlatOut	2004	Windows, PS2, Xbox
FlatOut 2	2006	Windows, PS2, Xbox
FlatOut: Ultimate Carnage	2007	X360, Windows
FlatOut: Head On	2008	PSP
FlatOut	2010	Wii
FlatOut 3: Chaos & Destruction	2011	Windows
FlatOut Stuntman	2013	Android
FlatOut 4: Total Insanity	2017	PS4, Xbox One, Windows
FlatOut VR	TBA	Meta Quest, PS5, SteamVR

FlatOut's gameplay style remained mostly consistent over the years, so much so that it was criticized for being stagnant and repetitive. The first game featured standard lap races and destruction derby competitions against seven computer-controlled opponents in either open environments or stadium laps. It was notable for featuring excessive car damage, silly physics and fun gameplay and FlatOut 2 was praised for evolving the gameplay of the first game and having better races, vehicles, graphics and controls. It received an enhanced version on Xbox 360 called FlatOut: Ultimate Carnage, which also received a port to the PlayStation Portable called FlatOut: Head On.

After FlatOut 2, the developers behind the series, Bugbear Entertainment, left the series and Dutch Team6 Game Studios took over the franchise for the next three entries and Kylotonn developed FlatOut 4: Total Insanity, the latest game in the series. However, future games did not exceed FlatOut 2's critical reception, with FlatOut 3: Chaos & Destruction being considered one of the worst games ever made, FlatOut for the Wii being considered "awful" by Nintendo Gamer and FlatOut 4: Total Insanity receiving middling reviews. An iOS rag doll spin-off titled FlatOut Stuntman was developed and published by Team6 Game Studios in 2013.
