= ProCharger =

Division of Accessible Technologies, Inc

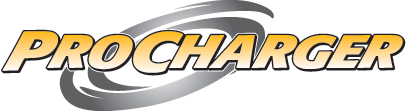

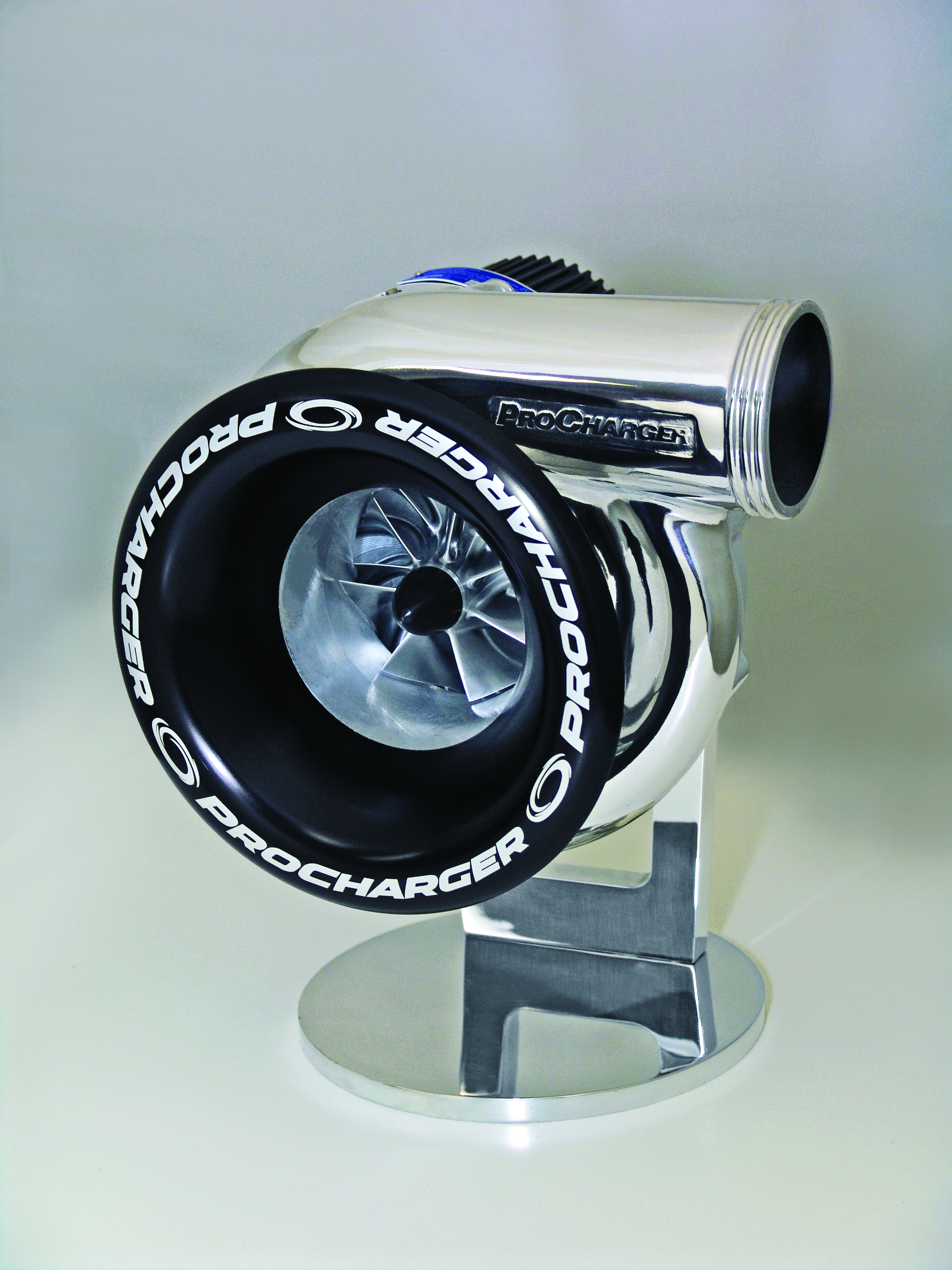
- ProCharger Supercharger in Kansas City
- Type: Private company
- Industry: Automotive aftermarket
- Founded: Lenexa, Kansas, USA (1993)
- Founder: Dan Jones & Ken Jones
- Headquarters: Lenexa, Kansas
- Products: Automotive parts Motorcycle Parts; Marine Parts; Industrial Compressors
- Website: ProCharger.com

ProCharger is the automotive supercharger division of Accessible Technologies, Inc. (ATI), a manufacturer of centrifugal compressor technology in multiple industries, located in the Kansas City metropolitan area. Inovair is the name of the company’s industrial products division.

== History ==
ProCharger was incorporated in December 1993, and its initial supercharger systems were for 5.0 Mustangs and carbureted Chevrolet applications. ProCharger was originally located in a leased property in Lenexa, KS. In December 1998 it moved into a building designed specifically for the company, and that building was expanded in 2004. In 2010, the company acquired control of a second building, adjacent to the primary building.

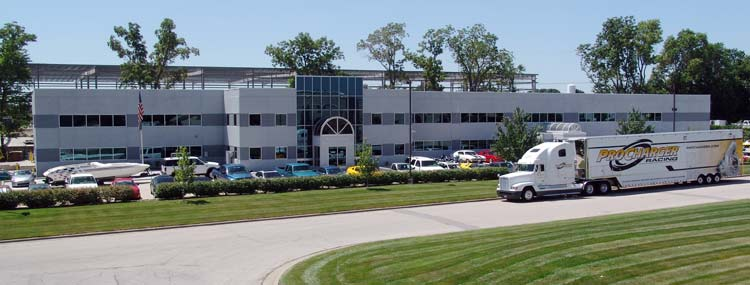
ProCharger headquarters

== Products and distribution ==
The company manufactures ProCharger superchargers and supercharger systems for a variety of applications, including automotive, truck, motorcycle, UTV (utility terrain vehicle) and marine. ProChargers are distributed primarily through a network of dealers who have installation and calibration capabilities. The company also designs aircraft deicing compressors and industrial blowers, blower packages and compressors through its Inovair division.

== Manufacturing ==
Superchargers, supercharger systems and subassemblies are manufactured in-house on computer numerical control (CNC) equipment, utilizing coordinate measuring machines (CMM's), balancing equipment, run-in stands and other equipment to verify quality during the production and assembly process. Billet impellers are manufactured from large diameter sticks of 7075 T-6 aluminum, which are cut to height on the saw, contoured on a CNC lathe and then machined on a CNC mill (5 axis, 4 axis or 3 axis, depending on complexity). On its street-legal superchargers, ProCharger offers a choice of noise levels, with the quieter "stealth" gearset featuring a helical design. Quality control includes running every supercharger that leaves the facility, rather than random sampling. The engineering team utilizes 3D computer-aided design software, rapid prototyping equipment, a large test lab, and engine and chassis dynamometers during the R&D process.

== Industry contributions ==
Among its initial industry contributions, ProCharger was the first to offer a complete intercooled supercharger system for the aftermarket performance industry In track testing in July 1994, the automotive press documented an improvement in quarter mile performance of 2 seconds and 16 mph on a stock 1993 Cobra running 9 psi in 97 degree weather, utilizing an intercooled ProCharger system.

In 1995, an intercooled ProCharger system became the first supercharger system to receive an emissions exemption (CARB EO # D-365) for an application running more than 8 psi of boost, receiving that exemption for a 14 psi intercooled supercharger system for a 5.0 Mustang. In 1996, ProCharger was the first company to offer complete intercooled supercharger systems for marine applications.

In 2000, Doug Mangrum became the first racer to run faster than a 7.0 ET (elapsed time) in the quarter mile using a centrifugal supercharger. Donny Walsh and Jim Summers soon followed with 6-second quarter mile passes in the same year, with all 3 using a ProCharger supercharger and also exceeding 200 mph. The supercharger design used by these 3 racers includes a patented “bearing within a bearing” design for the high speed output shaft.

In 2006, Bo Butner, running a ProCharger supercharger, became the first racer to win a championship in NHRA running a centrifugal supercharger, which had previously been outlawed in NHRA.

The company began manufacturing intercooled supercharger systems for Harley Davidson motorcycles in 2006. That product included several patented design elements, and this H-D supercharger kit in 2006 was awarded a Popular Mechanics award for Design and Innovation, and then in 2008 achieved further industry recognition as the Easyriders Performance Product of the Year.

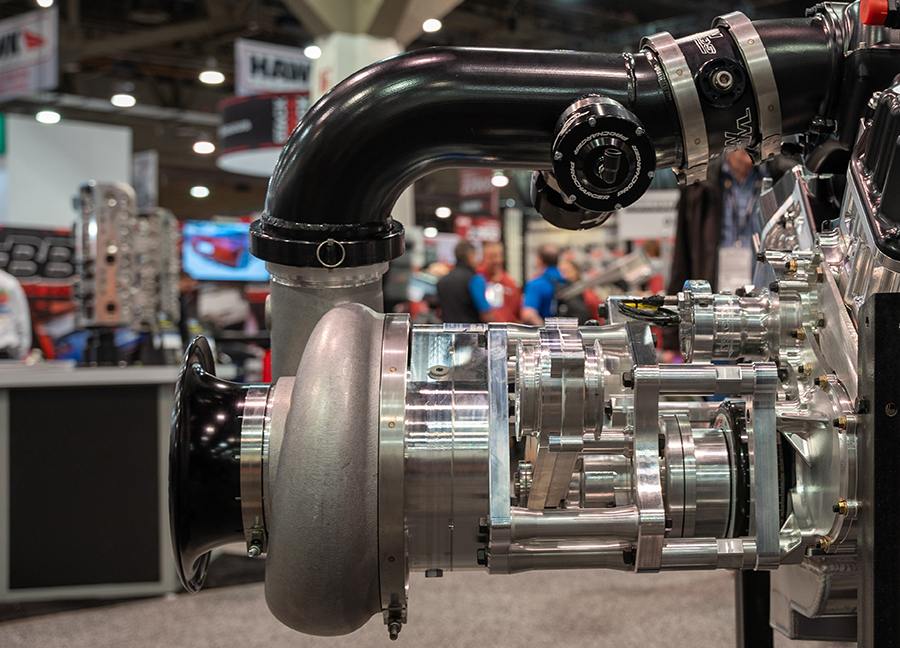
ProCharger F-4X-144 supercharger with CrankDrive(TM)

ProCharger has a notable history of innovation and new product development. In 2000, ProCharger managed an industry first by offering the first gear driven centrifugal supercharger with self-contained oiling. It is credited with being the first to offer a supercharger system for Corvettes with LS engines, and in 2010 was the first to introduce supercharger systems for the Ford Raptor and 3.7L V6 Mustang. In testing by the automotive press in 2011 on a stock 6.2L Ford Raptor, an intercooled ProCharger supercharger system increased performance by over 200 horsepower, and was also reported to be installed in approximately 4 hours. In 2013 the i-1 ProCharger supercharger model was introduced at the SEMA trade show and was the first production supercharger offering a programmable/variable ratio design and touchscreen cockpit control. Starting in 2014 several racers from the Street Outlaws TV show on Discovery Channel have been featured with ProCharger superchargers on their race cars 1. In 2015, ProCharger was the first to introduce an aftermarket supercharger system for C7 Z06 Corvettes. In the fall of 2016, the Engine Power television show “Making a Mustang Monster” featured a ProCharger system adding approximately 300 horsepower to a brand new 2016 Mustang with no other modifications.

== Sponsorship ==
ProCharger does not sponsor race cars directly, but does act as class sponsor for several racing classes in multiple sanctioning bodies, and acts as a contingency sponsor in additional racing sanctioning bodies. Notable racers who have won championships using ProCharger products include Aaron Bates, Joe Guertin, Phil Hines, John Urist, James Lawrence, Marcro Abruzzi, Johnny Coleman, Jason Lee, Tim Matherly, Nina Gusler, Jarod Wenrick, Kevin Young, Steve Jackson, Rich Bruder, Mike Modeste, Mark Micke, Don Walsh, Jim Blair and Jimmy LaRocca.
