= Bugbear Entertainment =

Finnish video game developer

Bugbear Entertainment Oy
- Company type: Subsidiary
- Industry: Video games
- Founded: 2000; 26 years ago
- Founder: Janne Alanenpää
- Headquarters: Helsinki, Finland
- Key people: Janne Alanenpää (CEO, creative director)
- Number of employees: 28 (2021)
- Parent: THQ Nordic (2018–present)
- Website: bugbeargames.com

Bugbear Entertainment Oy is a Finnish video game developer based in Helsinki, founded by Janne Alanenpää in 2000. The company is best known for the FlatOut series and Wreckfest. In November 2018, a majority stake of the company was acquired by THQ Nordic.

== History ==
Bugbear Entertainment was founded in Helsinki in 2000 by Janne Alanenpää. On 14 November 2018, THQ Nordic announced that they had acquired 90% of Bugbear for an undisclosed sum, leaving open the option to acquire the remaining 10% later on. At this time, Bugbear had 18 employees and was led by co-founder Alanenpää as chief executive officer and creative director. As of March 2020, Bugbear has 28 employees.

All computer games developed by Bugbear are made in the car simulator genre. One of the well-known developments is the FlatOut series of games, the first game of which was released in 2004 for the personal computer and the Xbox and PlayStation 2 game consoles. The games in the series have received various awards from the media and favorable reviews from critics and players. The average review score, according to Metacritic, is 76 out of 100. In addition to the FlatOut series, the company has developed other game projects such as Rally Trophy, a realistic rallying simulator.

Bugbear also released a new game from the Ridge Racer series, Ridge Racer Unbounded, which was released in 2012.

On June 14, 2018, the company released a new game, Wreckfest, previously known under the working title Next Car Game.

Bugbear used its own ROMU game engine (also known as the Bugbear Game Engine) to develop all games.

== Games developed ==
Year	Title	Platform(s)	Publisher(s)
2001	Rally Trophy	Microsoft Windows	JoWooD Productions
2003	Tough Trucks	Microsoft Windows	Activision Value
2004	FlatOut	Microsoft Windows, PlayStation 2, Xbox	Empire Interactive, Vivendi Universal Games
2005	Glimmerati	N-Gage	Nokia
2006	FlatOut 2	Microsoft Windows, PlayStation 2, Xbox	Empire Interactive, Vivendi Universal Games, Konami
2007	FlatOut: Ultimate Carnage	Microsoft Windows, Xbox 360	Empire Interactive
2007	Sega Rally Revo	PlayStation Portable	Sega
2012	Ridge Racer Unbounded	Microsoft Windows, PlayStation 3, Xbox 360	Namco Bandai Games
2018	Wreckfest	Microsoft Windows, PlayStation 4, PlayStation 5, Xbox One, Xbox Series X/S, Nintendo Switch	THQ Nordic
2026	Wreckfest 2	Microsoft Windows, PlayStation 5, Xbox Series X/S	THQ Nordic
