= Team6 Game Studios =

Dutch video game developer

Team6 Game Studios B.V.
- Type: Division
- Industry: Video games
- Founded: 2001; 25 years ago
- Founder: Ronnie Nelis
- Defunct: 2024
- Fate: Bankrupt
- Successor: Focuspoint Studios
- Headquarters: Assen, Netherlands
- Key people: Nico Braam; Niels Kleine; Erwin de Vries
- Products: FlatOut 3 NASCAR Arcade Rush
- Number of employees: >35
- Parent: Lion Castle Entertainment
- Divisions: Cherrycan; Bee Royale; Rebel Games
- Website: www.team6-games.com

Team6 Game Studios B.V., later known as Fusion Interactive, was a privately owned Dutch video game developer based in Assen, Netherlands.

Founded in 2001 under a different name, the creative team developed several games. However, in 2003, the founders decided to change the name to Team6 Game Studios B.V. At its peak, the studio employed 74 staff. In 2017, CEO Ronnie Nelis passed the leadership to Roderick Roode. The company was declared bankrupt in 2024.

As of 2021, Team6 has developed over 80 games, some of which feature motorsport licenses such as the National Hot Rod Association and Monster Jam. The studio has been criticized for its generally poor quality of games, such as FlatOut 3: Chaos & Destruction, which is the 5th worst rated game on Steam, Road Rage, which Metacritic lists as the second-worst game of 2017, and Taxi Chaos, which Metacritic lists as the fourth-worst game of 2021.

== History ==
Team6 Game Studios was founded by Ronnie Nelis in 2001. Ronnie Nelis' first project was a fighting game called Death Compatible, developed for a contest held by the game magazine PC Zone. Nelis won the first prize in the contest, and as part of the prize, the game was supposed to be released. However, the publisher who was supposed to release it closed its doors shortly after. Despite this setback, Nelis founded Team6 Game Studios V.O.F. and found a new partner to release their first official title: Taxi Challenge Berlin. In the following years, they specialized in racing games and created numerous titles.

Most of their games were initially developed for PC. However, starting in 2009, they expanded their development to include several titles for Nintendo Wii and Nintendo DS. The studio's proprietary engine, Engine Six, was one of the first engines to support Nintendo Wii and Nintendo 3DS.

Since 2012, the studio has served as the official developer for the Monster Jam games published by Game Mill and owned by Feld Motorsports. The decision to partner with Team6 was driven by Feld Motorsports' goal to make the franchise more kid-friendly, shifting away from hardcore simulation.

In 2012, the studio developed the world's first official squash video game simulation in collaboration with the World Squash Federation. The studio also developed a second squash game in 2015 which was officially licensed by the Professional Squash Association.

In 2013, Team6 created FlatOut Stuntman in collaboration with Nvidia. The Android game was used as a showcase for Nvidia as it supported specific features of the Tegra mobile processor. FlatOut Stuntman received an average score of 4.1 out 5, based on over 25,000 votes on Google Play.

Up until 2014, Team6 created most of their titles in their own Engine Six.

In 2014, they started using Unity for their mobile games, and in 2015 they switched to the Unreal Engine for their console titles.

Along the way, the studio also started developing mobile games for Android and iOS. Originally their first mobile title was New Kids Nitro Racer, however this was ultimately only released on PC.

== Games ==
2002

- Taxi Challenge Berlin

2003

- Taxi Racer Hong Kong 2
- Taxi Racer New York 2

2004

- Shanghai Street Racer
- Taxi Racer London 2

2005

- Taxi 3: eXtreme Rush
- Downtown Challenge
- Manhattan Chase
- Scooter War3z
- Pizza Dude

2006

- Glacier
- Jakarta Motocross Challenge / Wild Hogs
- Tesco Ice Racing
- Super Taxi Driver 2006
- Paris Chase

2007

- ESR: European Street Racing
- GSR: German Street Racing
- Fiat 500
- Ultimate Motorcross
- X1 Super Boost / F1 Chequered Flag

2008

- FSR: French Street Racing
- Ultimate Monster Trucks
- Mercedes CLC Dream Test Drive
- Alpha Zylon

2009

- Street Racer Europe
- Amsterdam Taxi Madness
- Glacier 2
- Monster Trucks Mayhem

2010

- Battle Metal: Street Riot Control / Highspeed Control: Carbon-Edition
- Calvin Tucker's Redneck: Farm Animals Racing Tournament
- FlatOut (Wii)
- Glacier 3: The Meltdown
- Speed
- Big City Racer
- Heavy, The (cancelled)

2011

- Street Racer Europe 2
- FlatOut 3: Chaos & Destruction
- Supersonic Racer
- Hyper Fighters

2012

- WSF Squash
- Speed 2

2013

- New Kids Nitro Racer
- FlatOut Stuntman

2014

- Super Sonic Racers
- Engines of War

2015

- Monster Jam: As Big As It Gets
- Monster Jam: Battlegrounds
- PSA World Tour Squash 2015
- Battle Waves
- Goji Farm

2016

- Monster Jam: Crush It!
- DinoFense

2017

- Road Rage
- Uphill Rush

2018

- Super Street: The Game

2019

- Street Outlaws: The List
- Super Street Racer

2021

- Taxi Chaos
- Street Outlaws 2: Winner Takes All

2022

- NHRA Championship Drag Racing: Speed For All

2023

- NASCAR Arcade Rush
