= FlatOut 2 =

2006 video game

- Developer: Bugbear Entertainment (Note: Ported to Mac OS X by Virtual Programming)
- Publisher: Empire Interactive
- Designer: Janne Alanenpää
- Programmer: Tatu Blomberg
- Artist: Mikko Kautto
- Series: FlatOut
- Platforms: Windows; PlayStation 2 Xbox; Xbox 360; PlayStation Portable; Mac OS X
- Release: June 30, 2006: Flatout 2; EU: June 30, 2006; NA: August 1, 2006; NA: October 2, 2008 (Mac OS X) Ultimate Carnage Xbox 360; EU: July 22, 2007; AU: August 1, 2007; NA: October 2, 2007 PlayStation Portable; NA: March 11, 2008; AU: March 12, 2008; EU: March 14, 2008 Windows; EU: August 1, 2008; NA: September 2, 2008
- Genres: Racing, action
- Modes: Single-player, multiplayer

FlatOut 2 is an action racing video game developed by Bugbear Entertainment and published by Empire Interactive for Windows, PlayStation 2 and Xbox. It was released in Russia on June 29, 2006, in Europe on June 30, and in North America on August 1. The game received positive reviews.

The sequel to 2004's FlatOut, FlatOut 2 is themed more on the street racing/import tuner scene than its predecessor. A notable change is the tire grip; players can take more control of their car, worrying less about skidding in tight turns. The game has three car classes: derby, race, and street.

An enhanced port was released in 2007 for the Xbox 360 and Windows as FlatOut: Ultimate Carnage. A PlayStation Portable port of Ultimate Carnage was released as FlatOut: Head On in 2008. The same year, a Mac OS X version of the game was released by Virtual Programming. An update for the PC version was released in July 2024, that implemented Steam Workshop support, improved support for the Steam Deck and added various quality-of-life improvements. In 2023 Virtual Programming released the game to the Mac App Store with the game being updated from the original 32-bit Mac OS X version to a 64-bit version compatible with both 64-bit Intel and Apple Silicon processors, requiring macOS Big Sur or newer.

== Gameplay ==
=== Ragdoll physics ===
The ragdoll physics have been greatly improved from the previous game. During the race, the driver may be thrown out of the car if slammed into a wall at a high speed. In the numerous stunt minigames, players can shoot the driver out of the car in order to complete objectives like knocking down a set of bowling pins, hitting the designated spots on a dartboard, scoring a field goal or flying through flaming hoops. Players must use 'aerobatics' to control the driver in-flight, but overusing it will increase drag, which will slow the driver down and possibly prevent them from reaching the designated target. If the driver falls short of the target, players can use the "nudge". This gives the driver a small upward boost and slightly reduces drag. In the Stone Skipping Stunt minigame, the players must use nudge just as the driver hits the surface of the water to skip the most efficiently and reach the furthest.

== Reception ==
=== Critical reception ===
Reception

Aggregate score
Aggregator	Score		
Aggregator	PC	PS2	Xbox
Metacritic	76/100	73/100	73/100

Review scores
Publication	Score		
Publication	PC	PS2	Xbox
Edge	6/10	6/10	6/10
Electronic Gaming Monthly	N/A	5.17/10	5.17/10
Eurogamer	N/A	N/A	8/10
Famitsu	N/A	28/40	N/A
Game Informer	N/A	7.5/10	7.5/10
GamePro	N/A	N/A	3/5
GameSpot	7.4/10	7.4/10	7.4/10
GameTrailers	8/10	8/10	8/10
GameZone	N/A	7/10	N/A
IGN	8.3/10	8.3/10	8.3/10
Official U.S. PlayStation Magazine	N/A	7.5/10	N/A
Official Xbox Magazine (US)	N/A	N/A	7/10
PC Gamer (US)	80%	N/A	N/A
The Sydney Morning Herald	3/5	3/5	3/5

The PC version of FlatOut 2 received "generally favorable reviews", while the PlayStation 2 and Xbox versions received "average" reviews, according to the review aggregation website Metacritic. In Japan, Famitsu gave the PS2 version a score of all four sevens for a total of 28 out of 40.

=== Awards ===
Date	Award	Category	Release edition	Result	Ref.
May 20, 2006	IGN Best of E3 2006	Best Racing Game	PS2	Runner-up	
December 20, 2006	X-Play Game of the Year	Best Racing Game	Xbox	Won	

== FlatOut: Ultimate Carnage ==
FlatOut: Ultimate Carnage is an enhanced port of FlatOut 2 featuring new gameplay modes, soundtrack and graphics as well as at least two new cars. It was known earlier as FlatOut: Total Carnage. FlatOut: Ultimate Carnage was released on July 22, 2007, in Europe, on August 1 in Australia, and on October 2 in North America for the Xbox 360.

The Microsoft Windows version was released through the Steam network on August 26, 2008, and in stores on September 2. There is also a handheld version of the game for the PlayStation Portable called FlatOut: Head On, which was released in Australia on March 12, 2008, in Europe two days later, and in North America on April 4.

=== Gameplay ===
Ultimate Carnage introduces a Carnage mode, a challenge series type of mode, which includes 36 challenges among stunts, demolition derby deathmatches, carnage races, and beat the bombs.

The cars are more detailed than previous games in the series, employing the latest in dynamic lighting and shadow technology, and a greatly enhanced damage and physics engine where each car is made of up to 40 separate destructible parts. The single player game supports up to 11 other AI-controlled cars in each race.

A new multiplayer format is also included; this runs on the Games for Windows – Live system which requires the user to either sign into own Xbox LIVE or Games for Windows LIVE Gamertag, or sign up for one for free. The LAN function is not available in FlatOut: Ultimate Carnage, unlike the previous two FlatOut games for Windows.

=== Reception ===
Reception (FlatOut: Ultimate Carnage)

Aggregate score
Aggregator	Score		
Aggregator	PC	PSP	Xbox 360
Metacritic	79/100	74/100	80/100

Review scores
Publication	Score		
Publication	PC	PSP	Xbox 360
Edge	N/A	N/A	7/10
Electronic Gaming Monthly	N/A	N/A	8.17/10
Eurogamer	7/10	6/10	8/10
Famitsu	N/A	N/A	27/40
Game Informer	N/A	7.5/10	7.5/10
GamePro	N/A	N/A	4/5
GameRevolution	N/A	N/A	B
GameSpot	N/A	7.5/10	7.5/10
GameSpy	N/A	N/A	4/5
GameZone	N/A	8/10	8.7/10
IGN	7.8/10	7.7/10	8.5/10
Official Xbox Magazine (US)	N/A	N/A	7.5/10
PC Gamer (UK)	82%	N/A	N/A
PlayStation: The Official Magazine	N/A	4/5	N/A

The Xbox 360 and PC versions received "favorable" reviews, while the Head On version received "average" reviews, according to the review aggregation website Metacritic.

Hyper's Maurice Branscombe commended the Xbox 360 version for "looking and playing better than ever before", but did not like the soundtracks and stated that "the game's load times are too long". In Japan, Famitsu gave the same console version a score of three sevens and one six for a total of 27 out of 40.
