= FlatOut 4: Total Insanity =

2017 video game

- Developer: Kylotonn
- Publishers: Nacon; Strategy First (Steam)
- Director: Alain Jarniou
- Producer: Alexandre Assir
- Designer: Christophe Thibaut
- Programmer: Hardouin Pouzet
- Artist: Amaury Beyris
- Composers: Ali Robles; Kevin Christianson; Robin Feldman
- Series: FlatOut
- Platforms: PlayStation 4; Xbox One; Microsoft Windows
- Release: PlayStation 4, Xbox One; 17 March 2017; Microsoft Windows; 4 April 2017
- Genre: Racing
- Modes: Single-player, multiplayer

FlatOut 4: Total Insanity (stylized as FL4TOUT TOTAL INSANITY) is a 2017 racing video game developed by Kylotonn. It is the fourth game in the FlatOut series. The game received mixed reviews from critics.

== Gameplay ==
FlatOut 4: Total Insanity is a racing video game that features local and online multiplayer. There are two gameplay options: stunt and race. In the stunt mode, you have to perform stunts by driving a car and ejecting the driver. For example, in the stoneskipping mode, you eject the driver and try to skip them as far as possible in a pool. In the racing mode, you race against bots / others (multiplayer only). There is also a party option in the stunt mode where you compete against people in the same room to win the most points.

== Development and release ==
FlatOut 4: Total Insanity was developed by French studio Kylotonn and published by Bigben Interactive. The game was released for PlayStation 4 and Xbox One on 17 March 2017, while the Windows version was released on 4 April. A release date for the VR version of the game was not announced.

== Reception ==
FlatOut 4: Total Insanity received "mixed or average" reviews from critics, according to review aggregator website Metacritic.
